= 2010 FC Terek Grozny season =

Terek Grozny
2010 season
- Chairman: Ramzan Kadyrov
- Manager: Anatoly Baidachny
- Stadium: Akhmad Arena
- Russian Premier League: 12th
- Russian Cup: Round of 32 vs Luch-Energiya
- Top goalscorer: League: Shamil Asildarov (9); All: Shamil Asildarov (9)
Home colours	Away colours

The 200 FC Terek Grozny season was the third successive season that the club played in the Russian Premier League, the highest tier of football in Russia, in which they finished 12th. They also took part in the 2010–11 Russian Cup, reaching the Round of 32 where they were defeated by Luch-Energiya.

== Squad ==
As of match played 28 November 2010

No.	Name	Nationality	Position	Date of birth (age)	Signed from	Signed in	Contract ends	Apps.	Goals
Goalkeepers
1	Soslan Dzhanayev	(Russia)	GK	13 March 1987 (aged 23)	loan from Spartak Moscow	2010		3	0
12	Yaroslav Hodzyur	(Ukraine)	GK	6 March 1985 (aged 25)	Dynamo-2 Kyiv	2008		12	0
27	Ramzan Asayev	(Russia)	GK	27 February 1993 (aged 17)	Trainee	2010		1	0
35	Magomed Serajdinov	(Russia)	GK	14 December 1991 (aged 18)	Trainee	2008		0	0
95	Rizavdi Edilov	(Russia)	GK	26 June 1988 (aged 22)	Trainee	2005			
Defenders
2	Syarhey Amelyanchuk	(Belarus)	DF	8 August 1980 (aged 30)	Rostov	2008		73	1
3	Dmitri Yatchenko	(Russia)	DF	25 August 1986 (aged 24)	Spartak Nalchik	2010		30	0
4	Ze'ev Haimovich	(Israel)	DF	7 April 1983 (aged 27)	Maccabi Netanya	2009		20	0
5	Antonio Ferreira	(Brazil)	DF	24 October 1984 (aged 26)	Spartak Nalchik	2010		26	0
14	Xavier	(Cameroon)	DF	22 January 1984 (aged 26)	Viktoria Žižkov	2010		5	0
32	Mansur Soltayev	(Russia)	DF	4 January 1991 (aged 19)	Trainee	2008		1	0
33	Ismail Ediyev	(Russia)	DF	16 February 1988 (aged 22)	Trainee	2005			
35	Yusup Tepishev	(Russia)	DF	7 March 1992 (aged 18)	Trainee	2010		1	0
36	Magomed Adayev	(Russia)	DF	19 September 1992 (aged 18)	Trainee	2009		1	0
37	Sharudi Bukhiyev	(Russia)	DF	17 January 1991 (aged 19)	Trainee	2010		0	0
40	Rizvan Utsiyev	(Russia)	DF	7 February 1988 (aged 22)	Trainee	2005			
78	Alihan Ediyev	(Russia)	DF	23 November 1993 (aged 17)	Trainee	2010		0	0
90	Murad Tagilov	(Russia)	DF	27 January 1990 (aged 20)	Trainee	2008		2	0
92	Raybek Surhayev	(Russia)	DF	14 March 1992 (aged 18)	Trainee	2009		0	0
98	Batyr Umaro	(Russia)	DF	14 March 1992 (aged 18)	Trainee	2010		0	0
Midfielders
7	Blagoy Georgiev	(Bulgaria)	MF	21 December 1981 (aged 28)	Slavia Sofia	2009		47	2
8	Maurício	(Brazil)	MF	21 October 1988 (aged 22)	Fluminense	2010		28	4
9	Guy Essame	(Cameroon)	MF	25 November 1984 (aged 26)	Boavista	2008		48	0
17	Adlan Katsayev	(Russia)	MF	20 February 1988 (aged 22)	Trainee	2005			
20	Andrei Kobenko	(Russia)	MF	25 June 1982 (aged 28)	Rubin Kazan	2009		38	2
21	Oleg Vlasov	(Russia)	MF	10 December 1984 (aged 25)	Saturn Ramenskoye	2008		33	0
22	Levan Gvazava	(Georgia (country))	MF	8 July 1980 (aged 30)	Luch-Energiya Vladivostok	2009		39	2
34	Islam Dadayev	(Russia)	MF	26 November 1991 (aged 19)	Trainee	2008		0	0
39	Ali Idrisov	(Russia)	MF	20 April 1991 (aged 19)	Trainee	2009		0	0
44	Aslan Dashayev	(Russia)	MF	19 February 1989 (aged 21)	Trainee	2008		1	0
45	Ramzan Utsiyev	(Russia)	MF	24 February 1989 (aged 21)	Trainee	2008		1	0
50	Shamil Ashahanov	(Russia)	MF	23 December 1990 (aged 19)	Trainee	2010		0	0
55	Ramzan Sadulayev	(Russia)	MF	7 February 1992 (aged 18)	Trainee	2010		0	0
61	Movsur Adamov	(Russia)	MF	2 August 1991 (aged 19)	Trainee	2010		0	0
63	Vadim Belozyorov	(Russia)	MF	21 February 1990 (aged 20)	Trainee	2010		0	0
76	Alihan Soltayev	(Russia)	MF	24 August 1993 (aged 17)	Trainee	2010		0	0
77	Anzor Tembulatov	(Russia)	MF	8 June 1989 (aged 21)	Trainee	2008		1	0
80	Islam Dzhabrailov	(Russia)	MF	16 August 1992 (aged 18)	Trainee	2010		0	0
88	Bekkhan Usmanov	(Russia)	MF	16 July 1993 (aged 17)	Trainee	2010		0	0
Forwards
10	Shamil Lakhiyalov	(Russia)	FW	28 October 1979 (aged 31)	Anzhi Makhachkala	2007			
11	Shamil Asildarov	(Russia)	FW	18 May 1983 (aged 27)	Spartak Nalchik	2010			
19	Héctor Bracamonte	(Argentina)	FW	16 February 1978 (aged 32)	FC Moscow	2009		30	4
23	Islam Tsuroyev	(Russia)	FW	23 April 1989 (aged 21)	Angusht Nazran	2007			
28	Tiuí	(Brazil)	FW	4 December 1985 (aged 24)	Atlético Goianiense	2010		8	0
38	Salambek Elgajiyev	(Russia)	FW	28 December 1990 (aged 19)	Trainee	2010		0	0
51	Tarko Islamov	(Russia)	FW	22 June 1991 (aged 19)	Trainee	2009		1	0
70	Zaur Sadayev	(Russia)	FW	6 November 1989 (aged 21)	Trainee	2006			
71	Juan Carlos Arce	(Bolivia)	FW	10 April 1985 (aged 25)	Oriente Petrolero	2010		20	0
93	Apti Akhyadov	(Russia)	FW	24 August 1993 (aged 17)	Trainee	2010		1	0
99	Khalid Kadyrov	(Russia)	FW	19 April 1994 (aged 16)	Trainee	2010		1	0
Out on Loan
19	Ștefan Sicaci	(Moldova)	GK	8 September 1988 (aged 22)	Sheriff Tiraspol	2008		1	0
24	Dmitry Smirnov	(Russia)	MF	13 August 1980 (aged 30)	Luch-Energiya Vladivostok	2009		10	0
Left During the Season
6	Anderson Mineiro	(Brazil)	DF	24 April 1986 (aged 24)	loan from Náutico	2010		0	0
18	Timur Dzhabrailov	(Russia)	MF	5 August 1973 (aged 37)	Angusht Nazran	2001			
31	Andriy Dykan	(Ukraine)	GK	16 July 1977 (aged 33)	Tavriya Simferopol	2009		48	0
47	Khasan Dzhunidov	(Russia)	DF	15 March 1991 (aged 19)	Trainee	2009		1	0
86	Karim Diniyev	(Azerbaijan)	DF	5 September 1993 (aged 17)	Inter Baku	2009		0	0

=== Out on loan ===
Note: Flags indicate national team as defined under FIFA eligibility rules; some limited exceptions apply. Players may hold more than one non-FIFA nationality.

No. / Pos. / Nation / Player; 19 / GK / MDA / Ştefan Sicaci (at Volgar-Gazprom)	No. / Pos. / Nation / Player; 24 / MF / RUS / Dmitry Smirnov (at Luch-Energiya Vladivostok)

== Transfers ==
=== Winter ===
In: Note: Flags indicate national team as defined under FIFA eligibility rules; some limited exceptions apply. Players may hold more than one non-FIFA nationality.

No.	Pos.	Nation	Player
3	DF	RUS	Dmitri Yatchenko (from (Russia) Spartak Nalchik)
5	DF	BRA	Antonio Ferreira (from (Russia) Spartak Nalchik)
6	DF	BRA	Anderson Mineiro (loan from (Brazil) Náutico)
8	MF	BRA	Maurício (from (Brazil) Fluminense)
9	MF	CMR	Guy Essame (loan return from (Russia) Nizhny Novgorod)
11	FW	RUS	Shamil Asildarov (from (Russia) Spartak Nalchik)
24	MF	RUS	Dmitri Smirnov (end of loan at (Russia) Tom Tomsk)
27	GK	RUS	Ramzan Asayev
35	DF	RUS	Yusup Tepishev
38	FW	RUS	Salambek Elgadzhiyev
55	MF	RUS	Ramzan Sadulayev
71	MF	BOL	Juan Carlos Arce (from (Bolivia) Oriente Petrolero)
76	MF	RUS	Alikhan Soltayev
78	DF	RUS	Alikhan Ediyev
80	MF	RUS	Islam Dzhabrailov
88	MF	RUS	Bekkhan Usmanov
93	FW	RUS	Apti Akhyadov
98	DF	RUS	Batyr Umarov (from (Russia) Lider Khosi-Yurt (D4))
99	FW	RUS	Khalid Kadyrov

Out: Note: Flags indicate national team as defined under FIFA eligibility rules; some limited exceptions apply. Players may hold more than one non-FIFA nationality.

No.	Pos.	Nation	Player
1	GK	ALB	Ilion Lika (to (Albania) FK Vllaznia)
2	DF	SVK	Radoslav Zabavník (to (Germany) Mainz 05)
5	DF	BRA	Cléber (to (Poland) Wisła Kraków)
6	MF	ROU	Andrei Mărgăritescu (to (Romania) Dinamo București)
8	FW	ROU	Daniel Pancu (to (Bulgaria) CSKA Sofia)
11	MF	ROU	Florentin Petre (to (Bulgaria) CSKA Sofia)
14	DF	BUL	Valentin Iliev (to (Romania) Universitatea Craiova)
18	DF	RUS	Timur Dzhabrailov (retired)
19	GK	MDA	Stepan Sikach (on loan to (Russia) Volgar-Gazprom Astrakhan)
26	DF	RUS	Sergei Bendz (to (Russia) Nizhny Novgorod)
26	MF	GEO	Gogita Gogua (end of loan from (Russia) Spartak Nalchik)
35	GK	RUS	Askerkhan Dzhamuyev
42	FW	RUS	Islam Kadyrov
43	DF	RUS	Ismail Salmurzayev
54	MF	RUS	Magomed Muzayev
55	FW	RUS	Movsur Adamov
57	MF	RUS	German Kutarba
58	MF	BRA	Fabrício (to (Israel) Maccabi Netanya)
59	MF	RUS	Artyom Voronkin (to (Russia) Luch-Energiya Vladivostok)
—	FW	RUS	Igor Shevchenko (to (Russia) Sibir Novosibirsk, previously on loan at (Russia) Kuban Krasnodar)
—	MF	CMR	Jean Bouli (to (Russia) Luch-Energiya Vladivostok, previously on loan at (Russia) Nizhny Novgorod)
—	FW	RUS	Viktor Zemchenkov (to (Russia) Baltika Kaliningrad, previously on loan at (Russia) Nizhny Novgorod)

=== Summer ===
In: Note: Flags indicate national team as defined under FIFA eligibility rules; some limited exceptions apply. Players may hold more than one non-FIFA nationality.

No.	Pos.	Nation	Player
1	GK	RUS	Soslan Dzhanayev (loan from (Russia) Spartak Moscow)
14	DF	CMR	Xavier (from (Czech Republic) Viktoria Žižkov)
28	FW	BRA	Tiuí (from (Brazil) Atlético Goianiense)
63	MF	RUS	Vadim Belozerov

Out: Note: Flags indicate national team as defined under FIFA eligibility rules; some limited exceptions apply. Players may hold more than one non-FIFA nationality.

No.	Pos.	Nation	Player
6	DF	BRA	Anderson Mineiro (loan return to (Brazil) Náutico)
24	MF	RUS	Dmitri Smirnov (loan to (Russia) Luch-Energiya Vladivostok)
31	GK	UKR	Andriy Dykan (to (Russia) Spartak Moscow)
47	DF	RUS	Khasan Dzhunidov
86	MF	AZE	Karim Diniyev (to (Azerbaijan) Neftchi Baku)

== Competitions ==
=== Premier League ===
==== Results ====
14 March 2010 1	Sibir Novosibirsk	0–2	Terek Grozny	Novosibirsk
11:30 MSK (UTC+3)	Bukhryakov (yellow card) 45' (yellow-red card) 88'	Report	Georgiev (yellow card) 18'; Kobenko 40'; Asildarov 55'; Amelyanchuk (yellow card) 55'	Stadium: Spartak Stadium; Attendance: 11,500; Referee: Eduard Malyi

20 March 2010 2	Terek Grozny	1–1	Rostov	Grozny
14:15 MSK (UTC+3)	Asildarov 4'; Yatchenko (yellow card) 22'	Report	Lebedenko (yellow card) 18'; Ivanov (yellow card) 27'; Radić (yellow card) 37'; Adamov (yellow card) 58'; Pavlenko (yellow card) 66'; Kalachev (yellow card) 69'; Gațcan (yellow card) 78'; Ahmetović 81'; Anđelković (yellow card) 82'	Stadium: Sultan Bilimkhanov Stadium; Attendance: 9,350; Referee: Yuri Baskakov

28 March 2010 3	Rubin Kazan	0–0	Terek Grozny	Kazan
16:30 MSK (UTC+4)	Kasaev (yellow card) 65'; Jordi (yellow card) 81'	Report	Amelyanchuk (yellow card) 45'; Arce (yellow card) 50'; Utsiyev (yellow card) 79'; Sadayev (yellow card) 90'	Stadium: Central Stadium; Attendance: 10,072; Referee: Aleksei Nikolaev

4 April 2010 4	Terek Grozny	2–0	Krylia Sovetov	Grozny
14:00 MSK (UTC+4)	Bracamonte 19', 34' (yellow card) 25'	Report	Petrović (yellow card) 84'; Samsonov (yellow card) 90'	Stadium: Sultan Bilimkhanov Stadium; Attendance: 10,000; Referee: Aleksandr Kolobaev

10 April 2010 5	Spartak Moscow	2–1	Terek Grozny	Moscow
16:15 MSK (UTC+4)	Ferreira 58' (o.g.); Welliton 88'	Report	Yatchenko (yellow card) 9'; Asildarov 15'; Amelyanchuk (yellow card) 35'; Kobenko (yellow card) 42'	Stadium: Lokomotiv Stadium; Attendance: 17,100; Referee: Vladimir Pettay

18 April 2010 6	Terek Grozny	1–1	Dynamo Moscow	Grozny
14:00 MSK (UTC+4)	Ferreira (yellow card) 62'; Lakhiyalov 90' (pen.)	Report	Kowalczyk (yellow card) 44' (yellow-red card) 64'; Česnauskis (yellow card) 53'; Kombarov 60' (yellow card) 90'; Samedov (yellow card) 90'	Stadium: Sultan Bilimkhanov Stadium; Attendance: 10,000; Referee: Stanislav Sukhina

25 April 2010 7	Zenit St.Petersburg	0–0	Terek Grozny	Saint Petersburg
16:15 MSK (UTC+4)		Report	Ferreira (yellow card) 8'; Maurício (yellow card) 21'; Asildarov (yellow card) 28'; Arce (yellow card) 56'; Lakhiyalov (yellow card) 76'; Dykan (yellow card) 90'	Stadium: Petrovsky Stadium; Attendance: 21,000; Referee: Sergei Karasev

1 May 2010 8	Terek Grozny	0–0	Lokomotiv Moscow	Grozny
16:15 MSK (UTC+4)	Bracamonte (yellow card) 88'	Report	Kuzmin (yellow card) 32'; Guilherme (yellow card) 51'; Glushakov (yellow card) 72'; Maicon (yellow card) 76'	Stadium: Sultan Bilimkhanov Stadium; Attendance: 9,000; Referee: Vladislav Bezborodov

6 May 2010 9	Tom Tomsk	2–1	Terek Grozny	Tomsk
MSK (UTC+4)	Kornilenko 22' (pen.); Ivanov (yellow card) 45'; Dzhioyev (yellow card) 81'; Dzyuba 85'	Report	Ferreira (yellow card) 21'; Maurício (yellow card) 31'; Arce (yellow card) 45'; Asildarov 47'; Kobenko (yellow card) 63'; Sadayev (yellow card) 87'	Stadium: Trud Stadium; Attendance: 10,500; Referee: Aleksandr Kolobaev

10 May 2010 10	CSKA Moscow	4–1	Terek Grozny	Moscow
14:00 MSK (UTC+4)	Odiah 47' (red card) 69'; González 53'; Dzagoev 57', 62'; Necid (yellow card) 71'; Oliseh (yellow card) 90'	Report	Georgiev 26' (yellow card) 63'; Kobenko (yellow card) 33'; Utsiyev (yellow card) 71'	Stadium: Arena Khimki; Attendance: 6,500; Referee: Igor Egorov

14 May 2010 11	Terek Grozny	2–0	Saturn	Grozny
16:00 MSK (UTC+4)	Maurício 19'; Bracamonte 53'; Katsayev (yellow card) 56'; Amelyanchuk (yellow card) 82'	Report	Karyaka (yellow card) 28'; Grachyov (yellow card) 51'; Kuzmichyov (yellow card) 80'; Kudryashov (yellow card) 84'	Stadium: Sultan Bilimkhanov Stadium; Attendance: 7,500; Referee: Maksim Layushkin

8 July 2010 12	Spartak Nalchik	2–1	Terek Grozny	Nalchik
19:00 MSK (UTC+4)	Kontsedalov 16'; Leandro 40' (pen.) (yellow card) 47'; Džudović (yellow card) 41' (yellow-red card) 61'; Gogua (yellow card) 83'	Report	Yatchenko (yellow card) 39'; Gvazava 50'; Sadayev (yellow card) 87'	Stadium: Spartak Stadium; Attendance: 9,500; Referee: Yuri Baskakov

18 July 2010 13	Terek Grozny	1–0	Amkar Perm	Grozny
18:45 MSK (UTC+4)	Asildarov 42'; Utsiyev (yellow card) 45'; Kobenko (yellow card) 45'	Report	Knežević (yellow card) 38'; Belorukov (yellow card) 45'; Sirakov (yellow card) 45'	Stadium: Sultan Bilimkhanov Stadium; Attendance: 7,200; Referee: Aleksei Nikolaev

25 July 2010 14	Anzhi Makhachkala	1–0	Terek Grozny	Makhachkala
18:45 MSK (UTC+4)	Bakayev (yellow card) 38'; Tsorayev 75'	Report	Katsayev (yellow card) 38'; Gvazava (yellow card) 90'	Stadium: Dynamo Stadium; Attendance: 10,000; Referee: Almir Kayumov

31 July 2010 15	Terek Grozny	2–0	Alania Vladikavkaz	Grozny
18:45 MSK (UTC+4)	Maurício (yellow card) 51' (goal) 57'; Asildarov (yellow card) 73'; Utsiyev 83'	Report	Rotenberg (yellow card) 36'; Mashukov (yellow card) 36'; Gabulov (yellow card) 53' (yellow-red card) 76'; Bibilov (red card) 90'	Stadium: Sultan Bilimkhanov Stadium; Attendance: 6,000; Referee: Vladimir Kazmenko

6 August 2010 16	Rostov	1–0	Terek Grozny	Rostov-on-Don
21:00 MSK (UTC+4)	Pavlenko 75'	Report	Amelyanchuk (yellow card) 25'	Stadium: Olimp-2; Attendance: 12,000; Referee: Evgeny Turbin

15 August 2010 17	Terek Grozny	1–1	Rubin Kazan	Grozny
20:45 MSK (UTC+4)	Bracamonte 30'; Kobenko (yellow card) 81'	Report	Navas (yellow card) 19'; Noboa 52' (pen.); Murawski (yellow card) 55' (yellow-red card) 88'; Kaleshin (yellow card) 79'; Balyaikin (yellow card) 84'; Kasaev (yellow card) 90'	Stadium: Sultan Bilimkhanov Stadium; Attendance: 7,500; Referee: Aleksandr Kolobaev

21 August 2010 18	Krylia Sovetov	1–3	Terek Grozny	Samara
19:00 MSK (UTC+4)	Leilton 23'	Report	Maurício 3'; Lakhiyalov 43'; Asildarov 73'	Stadium: Metallurg Stadium; Attendance: 12,327; Referee: Yuri Baskakov

28 August 2010 19	Terek Grozny	2–0	Spartak Moscow	Grozny
16:00 MSK (UTC+4)	Asildarov 49'; Utsiyev 83'; Essame (yellow card) 90'	Report		Stadium: Sultan Bilimkhanov Stadium; Attendance: 9,500; Referee: Vladislav Bezborodov

12 September 2010 20	Dynamo Moscow	3–1	Terek Grozny	Moscow
17:30 MSK (UTC+4)	Kurányi 43' (yellow card) 62'; Voronin (yellow card) 46'; Ropotan (yellow card) 64'; Samedov 67' (yellow card) 81'; Semshov 73'; Rebko (yellow card) 90'	Report	Bracamonte (yellow card) 20'; Lakhiyalov 35' (yellow card) 63'; Essame (yellow card) 41'; Georgiev (yellow card) 90'	Stadium: Arena Khimki; Attendance: 6,213; Referee: Igor Egorov

20 September 2010 21	Terek Grozny	0–0	Zenit St.Petersburg	Grozny
16:00 MSK (UTC+4)		Report	Bystrov (yellow card) 30'; Denisov (yellow card) 87'	Stadium: Sultan Bilimkhanov Stadium; Attendance: 10,150; Referee: Maksim Layushkin

26 September 2010 22	Lokomotiv Moscow	2–1	Terek Grozny	Moscow
20:15 MSK (UTC+4)	Aliyev 3' (pen.) (yellow card) 40'; Maicon 28'	Report	Maurício 20'; Kobenko (yellow card) 48'; Georgiev (yellow card) 58'; Ferreira (yellow card) 66'; Utsiyev (yellow card) 85'	Stadium: Lokomotiv Stadium; Attendance: 8,867; Referee: Vladimir Kazmenko

2 October 2010 23	Terek Grozny	1–0	Tom Tomsk	Grozny
18:30 MSK (UTC+4)	Asildarov 21' (pen.)	Report	Kim (yellow card) 38'; Petković (yellow card) 50'; Kudryashov (yellow card) 56'; Smirnov (yellow card) 82'	Stadium: Sultan Bilimkhanov Stadium; Attendance: 7,500; Referee: Almir Kayumov

17 October 2010 24	Terek Grozny	0–3	CSKA Moscow	Grozny
14:00 MSK (UTC+4)	Ferreira (yellow card) 37'; Essame (yellow card) 62'; Utsiyev (yellow card) 83'	Report	Doumbia 18'; Vágner Love 76'; Honda 90'	Stadium: Sultan Bilimkhanov Stadium; Attendance: 9,300; Referee: Vladislav Bezborodov

23 October 2010 25	Saturn	1–0	Terek Grozny	Ramenskoye
18:30 MSK (UTC+4)	Nemov (yellow card) 20'; Kopúnek (yellow card) 24'; Karyaka (yellow card) 44'; Sapeta 79'	Report	Georgiev (yellow card) 9'; Bracamonte (yellow card) 52'	Stadium: Saturn Stadium; Attendance: 4,000; Referee: Aleksei Eskov

31 October 2010 26	Terek Grozny	1–1	Spartak Nalchik	Grozny
14:00 MSK (UTC+3)	Vasyanovich 14' (o.g.); Georgiev (yellow card) 30'; Amelyanchuk (yellow card) 50'	Report	Jovanović (yellow card) 55'; Dyadyun 87'	Stadium: Sultan Bilimkhanov Stadium; Attendance: 5,800; Referee: Evgeny Turbin

6 November 2010 27	Amkar Perm	2–0	Terek Grozny	Perm
14:00 MSK (UTC+3)	Novaković 24'; Ristić 46'	Report		Stadium: Zvezda Stadium; Attendance: 14,100; Referee: Yuri Baskakov

13 November 2010 28	Terek Grozny	1–3	Anzhi Makhachkala	Grozny
16:45 MSK (UTC+3)	Sadayev 13'; Kobenko (yellow card) 28' (yellow-red card) 38'	Report	Holenda 16'; Josan 62'; Tsorayev 66'	Stadium: Sultan Bilimkhanov Stadium; Attendance: 7,000; Referee: Sergei Karasev

20 November 2010 29	Alania Vladikavkaz	2–1	Terek Grozny	Vladikavkaz
14:00 MSK (UTC+3)	Bikmaev 64'; Gabulov 77'	Report	Sadayev (yellow card) 18'; Ediyev 45'; Utsiyev (yellow card) 69'; Maurício (yellow card) 82'; Ferreira (yellow card) 90'	Stadium: Republican Spartak Stadium; Attendance: 15,000; Referee: Mikhail Vilkov

28 November 2010 30	Terek Grozny	1–1	Sibir Novosibirsk	Grozny
14:00 MSK (UTC+3)	Asildarov 6'; Bracamonte (yellow card) 11'	Report	Shevchenko (yellow card) 40'; Aravin (yellow card) 42'; Antipenko (yellow card) 65'; Čížek 71'; Šumulikoski (yellow card) 90'	Stadium: Sultan Bilimkhanov Stadium; Attendance: 7,000; Referee: Aleksei Eskov

==== League table ====
Pos	Team	Pld	W	D	L	GF	GA	GD	Pts	Qualification or relegation
10	Saturn	30	8	10	12	27	38	−11	34	Team disbanded after season (Note: Saturn Moscow Oblast were disbanded at the end of the season after amassing debts of RUB 800m.)
11	Anzhi Makhachkala	30	9	6	15	29	39	−10	33	
12	Terek Grozny	30	8	9	13	28	34	−6	33	
13	Krylia Sovetov Samara	30	7	10	13	28	40	−12	31	
14	Amkar Perm	30	8	6	16	24	35	−11	30	

Source: RFPL (in Russian)
Rules for classification: 1st points; 2nd matches won; 3rd head-to-head (points, matches won, goal difference, goals scored, away goals scored); 4th goal difference; 5th goals scored; 6th away goals scored; 7th position in previous season or decision game

=== Russian Cup ===
13 July 2010 Round of 32	Luch-Energiya	4–0	Terek Grozny	Vladivostok
12:00 MSK (UTC+4)	Satalkin 45'; Bochkov 52' (pen.); Adayev 78' (o.g.); Yegorov 83'	Report	Dzhabrailov (yellow card) 52'	Stadium: Dynamo Stadium; Attendance: 4,900; Referee: Aleksei Yeskov

== Squad statistics ==
As of match played 28 November 2010

=== Appearances and goals ===
No.	Pos	Nat	Player	Total		Premier League		Russian Cup	
No.	Pos	Nat	Player	Apps	Goals	Apps	Goals	Apps	Goals
1	GK	(Russia) RUS	Soslan Dzhanayev	3	0	3	0	0	0
2	DF	(Belarus) BLR	Syarhey Amelyanchuk	26	0	24+2	0	0	0
3	DF	(Russia) RUS	Dmitri Yatchenko	30	0	30	0	0	0
4	DF	(Israel) ISR	Ze'ev Haimovich	8	0	8	0	0	0
5	DF	(Brazil) BRA	Antonio Ferreira	26	0	25+1	0	0	0
7	MF	(Bulgaria) BUL	Blagoy Georgiev	19	1	17+2	1	0	0
8	MF	(Brazil) BRA	Maurício	28	4	25+3	4	0	0
9	MF	(Cameroon) CMR	Guy Essame	21	0	16+5	0	0	0
10	FW	(Russia) RUS	Shamil Lakhiyalov	24	3	23+1	3	0	0
11	FW	(Russia) RUS	Shamil Asildarov	29	9	28+1	9	0	0
12	GK	(Ukraine) UKR	Yaroslav Hodzyur	9	0	9	0	0	0
14	DF	(Cameroon) CMR	Xavier	5	0	2+3	0	0	0
17	MF	(Russia) RUS	Adlan Katsayev	18	0	8+10	0	0	0
19	FW	(Argentina) ARG	Héctor Bracamonte	28	4	21+7	4	0	0
20	MF	(Russia) RUS	Andrei Kobenko	21	1	14+7	1	0	0
22	MF	(Georgia (country)) GEO	Levan Gvazava	19	1	8+11	1	0	0
23	FW	(Russia) RUS	Islam Tsuroyev	1	0	0	0	1	0
27	GK	(Russia) RUS	Ramzan Asayev	1	0	0	0	1	0
28	FW	(Brazil) BRA	Tiuí	8	0	0+8	0	0	0
32	DF	(Russia) RUS	Mansur Soltayev	1	0	0	0	1	0
33	DF	(Russia) RUS	Ismail Ediyev	9	1	8+1	1	0	0
35	DF	(Russia) RUS	Yusup Tepishev	1	0	0	0	1	0
36	MF	(Russia) RUS	Magomed Adayev	1	0	0	0	1	0
40	DF	(Russia) RUS	Rizvan Utsiyev	25	2	24+1	2	0	0
44	MF	(Russia) RUS	Aslan Dashayev	1	0	0	0	1	0
45	MF	(Russia) RUS	Ramzan Utsiyev	1	0	0	0	1	0
47	DF	(Russia) RUS	Khasan Dzhunidov	1	0	0	0	1	0
51	FW	(Russia) RUS	Tarko Islamov	1	0	0	0	1	0
70	FW	(Russia) RUS	Zaur Sadayev	16	1	13+3	1	0	0
71	MF	(Bolivia) BOL	Juan Carlos Arce	20	0	16+4	0	0	0
80	MF	(Russia) RUS	Islam Dzhabrailov	1	0	0	0	1	0
90	DF	(Russia) RUS	Murad Tagilov	1	0	0	0	1	0
93	FW	(Russia) RUS	Apti Akhyadov	1	0	0	0	0+1	0
99	FW	(Russia) RUS	Khalid Kadyrov	1	0	0	0	0+1	0
Players who appeared for Terek Grozny but left during the season:
18	DF	(Russia) RUS	Timur Dzhabrailov	1	0	0+1	0	0	0
31	GK	(Ukraine) UKR	Andriy Dykan	18	0	18	0	0	0

=== Goal Scorers ===
Place	Position	Nation	Number	Name	Premier League	Russian Cup	Total
1	FW	(Russia)	11	Shamil Asildarov	9	0	9
2	FW	(Argentina)	19	Héctor Bracamonte	4	0	4
2	MF	(Brazil)	8	Maurício	4	0	4
4	FW	(Russia)	10	Shamil Lakhiyalov	3	0	3
5	DF	(Russia)	40	Rizvan Utsiyev	2	0	2
6	FW	(Russia)	70	Zaur Sadayev	1	0	1
6	MF	(Russia)	20	Andrei Kobenko	1	0	1
6	MF	(Bulgaria)	7	Blagoy Georgiev	1	0	1
6	MF	(Georgia (country))	22	Levan Gvazava	1	0	1
6	DF	(Russia)	33	Ismail Ediyev	1	0	1
6				Own goal	1	0	1
				TOTALS	28	0	28

=== Disciplinary record ===
Number	Nation	Position	Name	Premier League		Russian Cup		Total	
Number	Nation	Position	Name	Yellow card	Red card	Yellow card	Red card	Yellow card	Red card
2	(Belarus)	DF	Syarhey Amelyanchuk	6	0	0	0	6	0
3	(Russia)	DF	Dmitri Yatchenko	3	0	0	0	3	0
5	(Brazil)	DF	Antonio Ferreira	6	0	0	0	6	0
7	(Bulgaria)	MF	Blagoy Georgiev	6	0	0	0	6	0
8	(Brazil)	MF	Maurício	4	0	0	0	4	0
9	(Cameroon)	MF	Guy Essame	3	0	0	0	3	0
10	(Russia)	FW	Shamil Lakhiyalov	2	0	0	0	2	0
11	(Russia)	FW	Shamil Asildarov	2	0	0	0	2	0
17	(Russia)	MF	Adlan Katsayev	2	0	0	0	2	0
19	(Argentina)	FW	Héctor Bracamonte	5	0	0	0	5	0
20	(Russia)	MF	Andrei Kobenko	7	1	0	0	7	1
22	(Georgia (country))	MF	Levan Gvazava	1	0	0	0	1	0
40	(Russia)	DF	Rizvan Utsiyev	6	0	0	0	6	0
70	(Russia)	FW	Zaur Sadayev	4	0	0	0	4	0
71	(Bolivia)	MF	Juan Carlos Arce	3	0	0	0	3	0
80	(Russia)	MF	Islam Dzhabrailov	0	0	1	0	1	0
Players who left Terek Grozny during the season:
31	(Ukraine)	GK	Andriy Dykan	1	0	0	0	1	0
			TOTALS	61	1	1	0	62	1
