= 2009 FC Terek Grozny season =

Terek Grozny
2009 season
- Chairman: Ramzan Kadyrov
- Manager: Vyacheslav Hroznyi (until 19 October); Shahin Diniyev (from 20 October)
- Stadium: Sultan Bilimkhanov Stadium
- Russian Premier League: 12th
- Russian Cup: Round of 32 vs Mordovia Saransk
- Top goalscorer: League: Shamil Lakhiyalov (11); All: Shamil Lakhiyalov (11)
Home colours	Away colours

The 2009 Terek Grozny season was the second successive season that the club played in the Russian Premier League, the highest tier of football in Russia, in which they finished 12th. They also took part in the 2009–10 Russian Cup, reaching the Round of 32 where they were defeated by Mordovia Saransk.

== Squad ==
As of match played 29 November 2009

No.	Name	Nationality	Position	Date of birth (age)	Signed from	Signed in	Contract ends	Apps.	Goals
Goalkeepers
1	Ilion Lika	(Albania)	GK	17 May 1980 (aged 29)	Elbasani	2008		28	0
12	Yaroslav Hodzyur	(Ukraine)	GK	6 March 1985 (aged 24)	Dynamo-2 Kyiv	2008		3	0
19	Ștefan Sicaci	(Moldova)	GK	8 September 1988 (aged 21)	Sheriff Tiraspol	2008		1	0
30	Rizavdi Edilov	(Russia)	GK	26 June 1988 (aged 21)	Trainee	2005			
31	Andriy Dykan	(Ukraine)	GK	16 July 1977 (aged 32)	Tavriya Simferopol	2009		30	0
35	Askerhan Jamuyev	(Russia)	GK	14 January 1989 (aged 20)	Trainee	2008		0	0
35	Magomed Serajdinov	(Russia)	GK	14 December 1991 (aged 17)	Trainee	2008		0	0
Defenders
2	Radoslav Zabavník	(Slovakia)	DF	16 September 1980 (aged 29)	Sparta Prague	2008		54	1
4	Ze'ev Haimovich	(Israel)	DF	7 April 1983 (aged 26)	Maccabi Netanya	2009		12	0
5	Cléber	(Brazil)	DF	29 April 1974 (aged 35)	Wisła Kraków	2009		18	1
14	Valentin Iliev	(Bulgaria)	DF	11 July 1980 (aged 29)	CSKA Sofia	2008		49	5
18	Timur Dzhabrailov	(Russia)	DF	5 August 1973 (aged 36)	Angusht Nazran	2001			
23	Sergei Bendz	(Russia)	DF	3 April 1983 (aged 26)	Rostov	2008		22	3
28	Syarhey Amelyanchuk	(Belarus)	DF	8 August 1980 (aged 29)	Rostov	2008		47	1
32	Mansur Soltayev	(Russia)	DF	4 January 1991 (aged 18)	Trainee	2008		0	0
33	Ismail Ediyev	(Russia)	DF	16 February 1988 (aged 21)	Trainee	2005			
36	Magomed Adayev	(Russia)	DF	19 September 1992 (aged 17)	Trainee	2009		0	0
37	Sharudi Buhiyev	(Russia)	DF	17 January 1991 (aged 18)	Trainee	2008		0	0
38	Murad Tagilov	(Russia)	DF	27 January 1990 (aged 19)	Trainee	2008		1	0
40	Rizvan Utsiyev	(Russia)	DF	7 February 1988 (aged 21)	Trainee	2005			
43	Ismail Salmurzayev	(Russia)	DF	13 September 1991 (aged 18)	Trainee	2009		0	0
46	Karim Diniyev	(Azerbaijan)	DF	5 September 1993 (aged 16)	Inter Baku	2009		0	0
52	Raybek Surhayev	(Russia)	DF	14 March 1992 (aged 17)	Trainee	2009		0	0
Midfielders
6	Andrei Mărgăritescu	(Romania)	MF	1 January 1980 (aged 29)	Dinamo București	2008		35	0
7	Blagoy Georgiev	(Bulgaria)	MF	21 December 1981 (aged 27)	Slavia Sofia	2009		28	1
11	Florentin Petre	(Romania)	MF	15 January 1976 (aged 33)	CSKA Sofia	2008		39	5
17	Adlan Katsayev	(Russia)	MF	20 February 1988 (aged 21)	Trainee	2005			
20	Andrei Kobenko	(Russia)	MF	25 June 1982 (aged 27)	Rubin Kazan	2009		17	1
21	Oleg Vlasov	(Russia)	MF	10 December 1984 (aged 24)	Saturn Ramenskoye	2008		33	0
22	Levan Gvazava	(Georgia (country))	MF	8 July 1980 (aged 29)	Luch-Energiya Vladivostok	2009		20	1
26	Gogita Gogua	(Georgia (country))	MF	4 October 1983 (aged 26)	loan from Spartak Nalchik	2009		5	0
34	Islam Dadayev	(Russia)	MF	26 November 1991 (aged 18)	Trainee	2008		0	0
39	Anzor Tembulatov	(Russia)	MF	8 June 1989 (aged 20)	Trainee	2008		1	0
44	Aslan Dashayev	(Russia)	MF	19 February 1989 (aged 20)	Trainee	2008		0	0
45	Ramzan Utsiyev	(Russia)	MF	24 February 1989 (aged 20)	Trainee	2008		0	0
47	Khasan Dzhunidov	(Russia)	DF	15 March 1991 (aged 18)	Trainee	2009		0	0
49	Ali Idrisov	(Russia)	MF	20 April 1991 (aged 18)	Trainee	2009		0	0
50	Shamil Ashakhanov	(Russia)	MF	23 December 1990 (aged 18)	Trainee	2008		0	0
54	Magomed Muzayev	(Russia)	MF	24 January 1993 (aged 16)	Trainee	2009		0	0
57	German Kutarba	(Russia)	MF	10 September 1978 (aged 31)	SKA Rostov-on-Don	2009			
58	Fabrício	(Brazil)	MF	16 September 1981 (aged 28)	Mesquita	2009		0	0
59	Artyom Voronkin	(Russia)	MF	19 February 1986 (aged 23)	Avangard Kursk	2008		6	0
Forwards
8	Daniel Pancu	(Romania)	FW	17 August 1977 (aged 32)	Rapid București	2008		34	10
10	Shamil Lakhiyalov	(Russia)	FW	28 October 1979 (aged 30)	Anzhi Makhachkala	2007			
13	Zaur Sadayev	(Russia)	FW	6 November 1989 (aged 20)	Trainee	2006			
41	Islam Tsuroyev	(Russia)	FW	23 April 1989 (aged 20)	Angusht Nazran	2007			
42	Islam Kadirov	(Russia)	FW	27 November 1989 (aged 20)	Trainee	2008		0	0
51	Tarko Islamov	(Russia)	FW	22 June 1991 (aged 18)	Trainee	2009		0	0
55	Movsar Adamov	(Russia)	FW	2 August 1991 (aged 18)	Trainee	2009		0	0
69	Héctor Bracamonte	(Argentina)	FW	16 February 1978 (aged 31)	FC Moscow	2009		2	0
Out on Loan
15	Jean Bouli	(Cameroon)	MF	4 September 1980 (aged 29)	Dynamo Bryansk	2007			
16	Igor Shevchenko	(Russia)	FW	2 February 1985 (aged 24)	Luch-Energiya Vladivostok	2009		9	0
24	Dmitry Smirnov	(Russia)	MF	13 August 1980 (aged 29)	Luch-Energiya Vladivostok	2009		10	0
25	Guy Essame	(Cameroon)	MF	25 November 1984 (aged 25)	Boavista	2008		27	0
99	Viktor Zemchenkov	(Russia)	FW	15 September 1986 (aged 23)	Torpedo Moscow	2008		12	1
Left During the Season
3	Mikhail Mishchenko	(Russia)	DF	27 June 1989 (aged 20)	loan from Rubin Kazan	2009		8	0
29	Aleksandr Prudnikov	(Russia)	FW	24 February 1989 (aged 20)	loan from Spartak Moscow	2009		7	0
77	Marko Dinjar	(Croatia)	MF	21 May 1986 (aged 23)	Osijek	2008		5	0
	Sergei Serdyukov	(Russia)	FW	10 April 1981 (aged 28)	Tom Tomsk	2008		27	1

=== On loan ===
Note: Flags indicate national team as defined under FIFA eligibility rules; some limited exceptions apply. Players may hold more than one non-FIFA nationality.

No.	Pos.	Nation	Player
15	MF	CMR	Jean Bouli (at Nizhny Novgorod until end of the season)
16	FW	RUS	Igor Shevchenko (at Kuban Krasnodar until end of the season)
24	MF	RUS	Dmitry A.Smirnov (at Tom Tomsk until end of the season)

No.	Pos.	Nation	Player
25	MF	CMR	Guy Essame (at Nizhny Novgorod until end of the season)
99	FW	RUS	Viktor Zemchenkov (at Nizhny Novgorod until end of the season)

=== Left club during season ===
Note: Flags indicate national team as defined under FIFA eligibility rules; some limited exceptions apply. Players may hold more than one non-FIFA nationality.

No.	Pos.	Nation	Player
3	DF	RUS	Mikhail Mishchenko (loan return to Rubin Kazan)
29	FW	RUS	Aleksandr Prudnikov (loan return to Spartak Moscow)

No.	Pos.	Nation	Player
77	MF	CRO	Marko Dinjar (to Győri ETO)
—	FW	RUS	Sergei Serdyukov (to Nosta Novotroitsk)

== Transfers ==
=== In ===
Date	Position	Nationality	Name	From	Fee	Ref.
Winter 2009	GK	(Ukraine)	Andriy Dykan	Tavriya Simferopol	Undisclosed	
Winter 2009	DF	(Azerbaijan)	Karim Diniyev	Inter Baku	Undisclosed	
Winter 2009	DF	(Brazil)	Cléber	Wisła Kraków	Undisclosed	
Winter 2009	MF	(Bulgaria)	Blagoy Georgiev	Slavia Sofia	Undisclosed	
Winter 2009	MF	(Georgia (country))	Levan Gvazava	Luch-Energiya Vladivostok	Undisclosed	
Winter 2009	MF	(Russia)	Andrei Kobenko	Rubin Kazan	Undisclosed	
Winter 2009	MF	(Russia)	Dmitry A.Smirnov	Luch-Energiya Vladivostok	Undisclosed	
Winter 2009	FW	(Russia)	Igor Shevchenko	Luch-Energiya Vladivostok	Undisclosed	
Summer 2009	DF	(Israel)	Ze'ev Haimovich	Maccabi Netanya	Undisclosed	
Summer 2009	MF	(Georgia (country))	Gogita Gogua	Spartak Nalchik	End of Season	
Summer 2009	MF	(Brazil)	Fabrício	Mesquita	Free	
Summer 2009	MF	(Russia)	German Kutarba		Free	
Summer 2009	MF	(Russia)	Artyom Voronkin		Free	
Summer 2009	FW	(Argentina)	Héctor Bracamonte	FC Moscow	Undisclosed	

=== Loans in ===
Date from	Position	Nationality	Name	To	Date to	Ref.
Winter 2009	DF	(Russia)	Mikhail Mishchenko	Rubin Kazan	Summer 2009	
Winter 2009	FW	(Russia)	Aleksandr Prudnikov	Spartak Moscow	Summer 2009	

=== Out ===
Date	Position	Nationality	Name	To	Fee	Ref.
Winter 2009	DF	(Brazil)	David Lopes	Córdoba	Undisclosed	
Winter 2009	DF	(North Macedonia)	Nikola Karčev	Elbasani	Undisclosed	
Winter 2009	DF	(Russia)	Anatoli Romanovich	MVD Rossii	Undisclosed	
Winter 2009	DF	(Ukraine)	Ihor Dudnyk	Zakarpattia Uzhhorod	Undisclosed	
Winter 2009	MF	(Montenegro)	Rade Petrović	OFK Grbalj	Undisclosed	
Winter 2009	MF	(Russia)	Vladislav Kulik	Krylia Sovetov	Undisclosed	
Winter 2009	MF	(Russia)	Vladimir Kuzmichyov	Krylia Sovetov	Undisclosed	
Winter 2009	MF	(Russia)	Magomed Ozdoyev	Dynamo Kyiv	Undisclosed	
Winter 2009	FW	(Russia)	Magomed Adiyev	Nizhny Novgorod	Undisclosed	
Summer 2009	MF	(Croatia)	Marko Dinjar	Győri ETO	Undisclosed	
Summer 2009	FW	(Russia)	Sergei Serdyukov	Nosta Novotroitsk	Undisclosed	

=== Loans out ===
Date from	Position	Nationality	Name	To	Date to	Ref.
Winter 2009	FW	(Russia)	Sergei Serdyukov	Anzhi Makhachkala	Summer 2009	
Winter 2009	FW	(Russia)	Viktor Zemchenkov	Nizhny Novgorod	End of Season	
Summer 2009	MF	(Cameroon)	Jean Bouli	Nizhny Novgorod	End of Season	
Summer 2009	MF	(Cameroon)	Guy Essame	Nizhny Novgorod	End of Season	
Summer 2009	MF	(Russia)	Dmitri A.Smirnov	Tom Tomsk	End of Season	
Summer 2009	FW	(Russia)	Igor Shevchenko	Kuban Krasnodar	End of Season	

=== Released ===
Date	Position	Nationality	Name	Joined	Date
Winter 2009	DF	(Moldova)	Dumitru Dolgov	Sfântul Gheorghe	2010
Winter 2009	DF	(Russia)	Isa Hamidov		
Winter 2009	DF	(Russia)	Valihan Mejidov		
Winter 2009	MF	(Russia)	Suleyman Edilov		
Winter 2009	MF	(Russia)	Vitali Kuznetsov	Favorit Vyborg	
Winter 2009	MF	(Russia)	Islam Soltayev		
Winter 2009	MF	(Russia)	Artyom Voronkin	Luch-Energiya Vladivostok	2010
Winter 2009	FW	(Russia)	Hamad Asuhanov		
9 October 2009	MF	(Brazil)	Fabrício	Maccabi Netanya	2010

== Competitions ==
=== Russian Premier League ===
==== Results by round ====
Round	1	2	3	4	5	6	7	8	9	10	11	12	13	14	15	16	17	18	19	20	21	22	23	24	25	26	27	28	29	30
Ground	H	A	H	H	A	H	A	H	A	H	A	H	H	H	A	H	A	A	H	A	H	A	H	A	H	A	A	A	H	A
Result	W	D	W	L	L	D	W	D	L	W	D	W	D	W	D	L	W	L	L	L	W	L	W	W	L	L	L	L	L	L

Updated to match(es) played on 29 November 2009. Source: See Results
A = Away; H = Home; W = Win; D = Draw; L = Loss

==== Results ====
15 March 2009 1	Terek Grozny	1 – 0	Spartak Nalchik	Grozny
19:00 MSK (UTC+4)	Mishchenko (yellow card) 44'; Mărgăritescu (yellow card) 50'; Sadayev (yellow card) 84'; Cléber 90+3'	Report	Kontsevoy (yellow card) 30'; Mashukov (yellow card) 42'; Amisulashvili (yellow card) 78'; Filatov (yellow card) +'	Stadium: Sultan Bilimkhanov Stadium; Attendance: 10,000; Referee: Yuri Baskakov

21 March 2009 2	FC Moscow	0 – 0	Terek Grozny	Moscow
17:30 MSK (UTC+4)	Nababkin (yellow card) 6'; Samedov (yellow card) 35'; Krunić (yellow card) 67'	Report	Smirnov (yellow card) 8'; Zabavník (yellow card) 10'; Amelyanchuk (yellow card) 64'; Gvazava (yellow card) 69'; Kobenko (yellow card) 71'; Cléber (yellow card) 90+'; Dykan (yellow card) 90+'	Stadium: Eduard Streltsov Stadium; Attendance: 3,600; Referee: Alexei Kovalev

4 April 2009 3	Terek Grozny	1 – 0	Dynamo Moscow	Grozny
MSK (UTC+4)	Dzhabrailov 13' (yellow card) 29'; Pancu (yellow card) 22'; Georgiev (yellow card) 23'	Report	Granat (yellow card) 56' (yellow-red card) 74'; Tanasijević (yellow card) 79'; Kolodin (yellow card) 82'	Stadium: Sultan Bilimkhanov Stadium; Attendance: 8,500; Referee: Vladimir Pettay

11 April 2009 4	Terek Grozny	1 – 2	Rubin Kazan	Grozny
MSK (UTC+4)	Amelyanchuk (yellow card) 19'; Zabavník (yellow card) 54'; Dzhabrailov (yellow card) 64'; Mărgăritescu (yellow card) 76'; Lakhiyalov 90+3'	Report	Navas (yellow card) 5'; Semak 18'; Domínguez 20' (yellow card) 61'; Noboa (yellow card) 42'; Bukharov (yellow card) 68'	Stadium: Sultan Bilimkhanov Stadium; Attendance: 9,500; Referee: Aleksei Nikolaev

18 April 2009 5	Spartak Moscow	2 – 0	Terek Grozny	Moscow
17:30 MSK (UTC+4)	Bystrov (yellow card) 48' (goal) 73'; Makeyev (yellow card) 59'; Welliton 82'	Report	Mishchenko (red card) 57'; Amelyanchuk (yellow card) 74'; Smirnov (yellow card) 81'	Stadium: Lokomotiv Stadium; Attendance: 10,300; Referee: Nikolai Ivanov

25 April 2009 6	Terek Grozny	1 – 1	Saturn Moscow	Grozny
MSK (UTC+4)	Gvazava 26'; Smirnov (yellow card) 34'; Cléber (yellow card) 65'	Report	Angbwa (yellow card) 36'; Evseev 46'; Igonin (yellow card) 54'; Kovel (yellow card) 88'; Evseev (yellow card) 89'	Stadium: Sultan Bilimkhanov Stadium; Attendance: 9,200; Referee: Alexander Kolobaev

2 May 2009 7	Tom Tomsk	2 – 1	Terek Grozny	Tomsk
11:30 MSK (UTC+4)	Kornilenko 26'; Kharitonov (yellow card) 38'; Jokić 62'; Pareiko (yellow card) 90+'	Report	Georgiev (yellow card) 28'; Pancu 41'; Iliev (yellow card) 71'	Stadium: Trud Stadium; Attendance: 9,000; Referee: Sergei Karasev

10 May 2009 8	Terek Grozny	2 – 2	Amkar Perm	Grozny
14:00 MSK (UTC+4)	Pancu 2' (pen.), 85' (yellow card) 60'; Cléber (yellow card) 17'; Amelyanchuk (yellow card) 87'	Report	Kalashnikov (yellow card) 19'; Kushev 28', 45'; Jean Carlos (yellow card) 55'; Sirakov (yellow card) 68'; Sikimić (yellow card) 84'; Cherenchikov (yellow card) 88'	Stadium: Sultan Bilimkhanov Stadium; Attendance: 6,000; Referee: Stanislav Sukhina

16 May 2009 9	Lokomotiv Moscow	4 – 0	Terek Grozny	Moscow
14:15 MSK (UTC+4)	Odemwingie 13', 52' (yellow card) 21'; Ďurica (yellow card) 64'; Glushakov 66'; Charles (yellow card) 67'; Kuzmin (yellow card) 78'; Mujiri 90'	Report	Pancu (yellow card) 10' (yellow-red card) 64'; Georgiev (yellow card) 47'; Kobenko (yellow card) 67'; Zabavník (yellow card) 82'	Stadium: Lokomotiv Stadium; Attendance: 9,370; Referee: Vladimir Pettay

23 May 2009 10	Terek Grozny	2 – 0	Khimki	Grozny
19:00 MSK (UTC+4)	Kobenko 10' (yellow card) 51'; Lakhiyalov (yellow card) 63' (goal) 69'; Smirnov (yellow card) 65'	Report	Pylypchuk (yellow card) 52'; Nastić (yellow card) 55'; Golovatenco (yellow card) 58'	Stadium: Sultan Bilimkhanov Stadium; Attendance: 8,000; Referee: Yuri Baskakov

30 May 2009 11	Rostov	1 – 1	Terek Grozny	Rostov-on-Don
MSK (UTC+4)	Gațcan (yellow card) 47'; Astafyev 53'; Anđelković (yellow card) 56'; Lengyel (yellow card) 62'	Report	Lakhiyalov 26'; Mishchenko (yellow card) 35'; Georgiev (yellow card) 60'	Stadium: Olimp – 2 Attendance: 9,000; Referee: Almir Kayumov

13 June 2009 12	Terek Grozny	3 – 2	Krylia Sovetov Samara	Grozny
20:00 MSK (UTC+4)	Pancu 8', 39'; Bendz 84'	Report	Savin 47', 51'	Stadium: Sultan Bilimkhanov Stadium; Attendance: 8,000; Referee: Maksim Layushkin

11 July 2009 13	Terek Grozny	1 – 1	CSKA Moscow	Grozny
18:45 MSK (UTC+4)	Zabavník (yellow card) 64'; Pancu 71' (pen.); Petre (yellow card) 81'	Report	Mamayev (yellow card) 32'; Krasić (yellow card) 66'; Necid 68'	Stadium: Sultan Bilimkhanov Stadium; Attendance: 10,200; Referee: Vladislav Bezborodov

19 July 2009 14	Terek Grozny	3 – 2	Zenit St. Petersburg	Grozny
20:30 MSK (UTC+4)	Georgiev 22'; Gvazava (yellow card) 23'; Kobenko (yellow card) 26'; Pancu (yellow card) 31'; Lakhiyalov 57'; Iliev 90' (yellow card) 90'	Report	Ionov (yellow card) 9'; Pogrebnyak (yellow card) 30'; Huszti 72'; Pogrebnyak 75'; Denisov (yellow card) 90+'; Meira (yellow card) 90+'	Stadium: Sultan Bilimkhanov Stadium; Attendance: 8,100; Referee: Almir Kayumov

26 July 2009 15	Kuban Krasnodar	1 – 1	Terek Grozny	Krasnodar
21:00 MSK (UTC+4)	Kasaev 38'; Boaventura (yellow card) 51'; Ushenin (yellow card) 61'; Kuchuk (yellow card) 83'	Report	Iliev 45+1'; Cléber (yellow card) 73'; Mărgăritescu (yellow card) 76'; Georgiev (yellow card) 84'	Stadium: Kuban Stadium; Attendance: 14,000; Referee: Alexei Kovalev

1 August 2009 16	Terek Grozny	1 – 2	FC Moscow	Grozny
20:30 MSK (UTC+4)	Zabavník (yellow card) 60'; Mărgăritescu (yellow card) 71'; Lakhiyalov 77'	Report	Sheshukov (yellow card) 10'; Rebko (yellow card) 45+'; Vukić 62'; Česnauskis 74'; Epureanu (yellow card) 90+'	Stadium: Sultan Bilimkhanov Stadium; Attendance: 9,000; Referee: Stanislav Sukhina

8 August 2009 17	Dynamo Moscow	0 – 1	Terek Grozny	Moscow
14:00 MSK (UTC+4)	Kowalczyk (yellow card) 76'	Report	Petre 60' (yellow card) 90'; Dzhabrailov (yellow card) 75'	Stadium: Arena Khimki; Attendance: 4,523; Referee: Vladislav Bezborodov

15 August 2009 18	Rubin Kazan	4 – 0	Terek Grozny	Kazan
MSK (UTC+4)	Bukharov 13', 16', 89'; Domínguez 20'; Kaleshin (yellow card) 43'; Karadeniz (yellow card) 65'	Report	Mărgăritescu (yellow card) 33'; Sadayev (yellow card) 50'; Lakhiyalov (yellow card) 63'; Haimovich (yellow card) 86'	Stadium: Central Stadium; Attendance: 12,000; Referee: Alexandr Kolobnev

23 August 2009 19	Terek Grozny	2 – 3	Spartak Moscow	Grozny
21:00 MSK (UTC+4)	Zabavník (yellow card) 39'; Gogua (yellow card) 44'; Kutarba 62'; Dzhabrailov (yellow card) 65'; Lakhiyalov 90+2'	Report	Sabitov (yellow card) 15'; Yakovlev (yellow card) 17' (goal) 25'; Welliton 29', 33'; Makeyev (yellow card) 86'	Stadium: Sultan Bilimkhanov Stadium; Attendance: 3,500; Referee: Alexei Kovalev

29 August 2009 20	Saturn Moscow	3 – 0	Terek Grozny	Moscow
16:30 MSK (UTC+4)	Kuzmichyov 10'; Karyaka (yellow card) 33'; Ivanov 43'; Kirichenko 65'; Sapeta (yellow card) 81'	Report	Cléber (yellow card) 26'; Kobenko (yellow card) 30'; Zabavník (yellow card) 52'; Katsayev (yellow card) 81'	Stadium: Saturn Stadium; Attendance: 6,000; Referee: Vladislav Bezborodov

13 September 2009 21	Terek Grozny	4 – 0	Tom Tomsk	Grozny
20:40 MSK (UTC+4)	Lakhiyalov 34' (pen.), 57', 90'; Petre 49'; Zabavník (yellow card) 61'; Mărgăritescu (yellow card) 80'	Report	Kharitonov (yellow card) 12'; Volkov (yellow card) 86'	Stadium: Sultan Bilimkhanov Stadium; Attendance: 7,200; Referee: Almir Kayumov

20 September 2009 22	Amkar Perm	1 – 0	Terek Grozny	Perm
16:15 MSK (UTC+4)	Kushev (yellow card) 24' (goal) 44'; Cherenchikov (yellow card) 63'; Usminskiy (yellow card) 77'; Novaković (yellow card) 84'; Sikimić (yellow card) 90+'	Report	Utsiyev (yellow card) 9'; Gogua (yellow card) 50'; Iliev (yellow card) 53'; Georgiev (yellow card) 59'; Dzhabrailov (yellow card) 90+'	Stadium: Zvezda Stadium; Attendance: 8,800; Referee: Aleksei Nikolaev

27 September 2009 23	Terek Grozny	2 – 1	Lokomotiv Moscow	Grozny
16:15 MSK (UTC+4)	Haimovich (yellow card) 23'; Sadayev 24'; Pancu 54'; Gogua (yellow card) 90'; Petre (yellow card) 90+'	Report	Rodolfo (yellow card) 36' (goal) 80'; Dujmović (yellow card) 62'	Stadium: Sultan Bilimkhanov Stadium; Attendance: 7,100; Referee: Vladislav Bezborodov

3 October 2009 24	Khimki	1 – 2	Terek Grozny	Khimki
16:15 MSK (UTC+4)	Rotenberg (yellow card) 11'; Semochko (yellow card) 29'; Kirillov 85'	Report	Lakhiyalov 11' (pen.); Sadayev (yellow card) 14'; Georgiev (yellow card) 31'; Haimovich (yellow card) 40'; Gogua (yellow card) 79'; Dzhabrailov 83'; Dykan (yellow card) 90+'	Stadium: Arena Khimki; Attendance: 2,000; Referee: Aleksei Yeskov

18 October 2009 25	Terek Grozny	1 – 3	Rostov	Grozny
14:00 MSK (UTC+4)	Katsayev (yellow card) 2'; Cléber (yellow card) 39'; Pancu (yellow card) 45+'; Sadayev 52'; Utsiyev (yellow card) 75'	Report	Valikayev (yellow card) 3'; Gațcan 12'; Pavlenko 18'; Ahmetović 44'; Astafyev (yellow card) 51' (yellow-red card) 90'; Anđelković (yellow card) 65'	Stadium: Sultan Bilimkhanov Stadium; Attendance: 6,100; Referee: Maxim Lyayushkin

24 October 2009 26	Krylia Sovetov Samara	2 – 0	Terek Grozny	Samara
14:00 MSK (UTC+4)	Ignatyev 33'; Bobyor (yellow card) 40'; Jarošík (yellow card) 75'; Ivanov (yellow card) 82'; Adamov 84'	Report	Kobenko (yellow card) 21'; Utsiyev (yellow card) 40'; Petre (yellow card) 42'; Dzhabrailov (yellow card) 50'; Cléber (yellow card) 70'; Lakhiyalov (yellow card) 73'	Stadium: Metallurg Stadium; Attendance: 10,100; Referee: Alexei Kovalev

31 October 2009 27	CSKA Moscow	1 – 0	Terek Grozny	Moscow
18:00 MSK (UTC+4)	Necid 4' (yellow card) 23'	Report		Stadium: Luzhniki Stadium; Attendance: 3,700; Referee: Vladimir Pettay

8 November 2009 28	Zenit St. Petersburg	2 – 0	Terek Grozny	Saint Petersburg
16:45 MSK (UTC+4)	Tekke 26'; Utsiyev 39' (o.g.)	Report	Cléber (yellow card) 72'; Pancu (yellow card) 82'	Stadium: Petrovsky Stadium; Attendance: 18,000; Referee: Yuri Baskakov

21 November 2009 29	Terek Grozny	0 – 1	Kuban Krasnodar	Grozny
14:00 MSK (UTC+4)		Report	Khagush (yellow card) 38'; Shevchenko 54' (pen.)	Stadium: Sultan Bilimkhanov Stadium; Attendance: 5,000; Referee: Igor Egorov

29 November 2009 30	Spartak Nalchik	4 – 2	Terek Grozny	Nalchik
14:00 MSK (UTC+4)	da Silva 13'; Bikmaev (yellow card) 20'; Amelyanchuk 38' (o.g.); Kisenkov 43'; Siradze 58'	Report	Kobenko (yellow card) 30'; Lakhiyalov (yellow card) 45+' (goal) 90'; Dzhabrailov 52'	Stadium: Spartak Stadium; Attendance: 7,000; Referee: Vladimir Kazmenko

==== League table ====
Pos	Team	Pld	W	D	L	GF	GA	GD	Pts
10	Krylia Sovetov Samara	30	10	6	14	32	42	−10	36
11	Spartak Nalchik	30	8	11	11	36	33	+3	35
12	Terek Grozny	30	9	6	15	33	48	−15	33
13	Amkar Perm	30	8	9	13	27	37	−10	33
14	Rostov	30	7	11	12	28	39	−11	32

Source: RFPL (in Russian)
Rules for classification: 1st points; 2nd matches won; 3rd head-to-head (points, matches won, goal difference, goals scored, away goals scored); 4th goal difference; 5th goals scored; 6th away goals scored; 7th position in previous season or decision game

=== Russian Cup ===
15 July 2009 Round of 32	Mordovia Saransk	2 – 1	Terek Grozny	Saransk
18:00 MSK (UTC+4)	Zaytsev 68'; Kuleshov (yellow card) 75'; Sysuyev 79' (pen.); Kurdanin (yellow card) 90+2'	Report	Bendz (yellow card) 36'; Petre (yellow card) 50'; Iliev 75' (yellow card) 78'; Amelyanchuk (yellow card) 78'; Lakhiyalov (yellow card) 78'; Kobenko (yellow card) 83'	Stadium: Start Stadium; Attendance: 11,000; Referee: Vyacheslav Kharlamov

== Squad statistics ==
As of match played 29 November 2009

=== Appearances and goals ===
No.	Pos	Nat	Player	Total		Premier League		Russian Cup	
No.	Pos	Nat	Player	Apps	Goals	Apps	Goals	Apps	Goals
1	GK	(Russia) RUS	Rizavdi Edilov	2	0	2	0	0	0
2	DF	(Slovakia) SVK	Radoslav Zabavník	27	0	21+5	0	1	0
4	DF	(Israel) ISR	Ze'ev Haimovich	12	0	11+1	0	0	0
5	DF	(Brazil) BRA	Cléber	18	1	16+2	1	0	0
6	MF	(Romania) ROU	Andrei Mărgăritescu	17	0	15+1	0	1	0
7	MF	(Bulgaria) BUL	Blagoy Georgiev	28	1	25+2	1	1	0
8	FW	(Romania) ROU	Daniel Pancu	23	7	15+7	7	1	0
10	FW	(Russia) RUS	Shamil Lakhiyalov	25	11	21+3	11	1	0
11	MF	(Romania) ROU	Florentin Petre	20	2	15+4	2	1	0
13	FW	(Russia) RUS	Zaur Sadayev	17	2	10+7	2	0	0
14	DF	(Bulgaria) BUL	Valentin Iliev	23	3	21+1	2	1	1
17	MF	(Russia) RUS	Adlan Katsayev	11	0	7+4	0	0	0
18	DF	(Russia) RUS	Timur Dzhabrailov	22	3	19+2	3	1	0
20	MF	(Russia) RUS	Andrei Kobenko	17	1	12+4	1	0+1	0
21	MF	(Russia) RUS	Oleg Vlasov	16	0	5+11	0	0	0
22	MF	(Georgia (country)) GEO	Levan Gvazava	20	1	13+6	1	0+1	0
23	DF	(Russia) RUS	Sergei Bendz	11	1	3+7	1	1	0
26	MF	(Georgia (country)) GEO	Gogita Gogua	5	0	3+2	0	0	0
28	DF	(Belarus) BLR	Syarhey Amelyanchuk	29	0	28	0	0+1	0
30	GK	(Ukraine) UKR	Andriy Dykan	30	0	28+1	0	1	0
33	DF	(Russia) RUS	Ismail Ediyev	1	0	1	0	0	0
38	DF	(Russia) RUS	Murad Tagilov	1	0	0+1	0	0	0
39	MF	(Russia) RUS	Anzor Tembulatov	1	0	1	0	0	0
40	DF	(Russia) RUS	Rizvan Utsiyev	9	0	9	0	0	0
41	FW	(Russia) RUS	Islam Tsuroyev	1	0	0+1	0	0	0
57	MF	(Russia) RUS	German Kutarba	2	1	1+1	1	0	0
69	FW	(Argentina) ARG	Héctor Bracamonte	2	0	1+1	0	0	0
Players away on loan:
15	MF	(Cameroon) CMR	Jean Bouli	3	0	2+1	0	0	0
16	FW	(Russia) RUS	Igor Shevchenko	9	0	2+6	0	1	0
24	MF	(Russia) RUS	Dmitry Smirnov	10	0	9+1	0	0	0
25	MF	(Cameroon) CMR	Guy Essame	6	0	3+3	0	0	0
Players who appeared for Terek Grozny but left during the season:
3	DF	(Russia) RUS	Mikhail Mishchenko	8	0	7+1	0	0	0
29	FW	(Russia) RUS	Aleksandr Prudnikov	7	0	4+3	0	0	0

=== Goal Scorers ===
Place	Position	Nation	Number	Name	Premier League	Russian Cup	Total
1	FW	(Russia)	10	Shamil Lakhiyalov	11	0	11
2	FW	(Romania)	8	Daniel Pancu	7	0	7
3	DF	(Russia)	18	Timur Dzhabrailov	3	0	3
3	DF	(Bulgaria)	14	Valentin Iliev	2	1	3
5	MF	(Romania)	11	Florentin Petre	2	0	2
5	FW	(Russia)	13	Zaur Sadayev	2	0	2
7	DF	(Brazil)	5	Cléber	1	0	1
7	MF	(Georgia (country))	22	Levan Gvazava	1	0	1
7	MF	(Russia)	20	Andrei Kobenko	1	0	1
7	DF	(Russia)	23	Sergei Bendz	1	0	1
7	MF	(Bulgaria)	7	Blagoy Georgiev	1	0	1
7	DF	(Russia)	57	German Kutarba	1	0	1
				TOTALS	33	1	34

=== Disciplinary record ===
Number	Nation	Position	Name	Premier League		Russian Cup		Total	
Number	Nation	Position	Name	Booked	Sent off (straight red)	Booked	Sent off (straight red)	Booked	Sent off (straight red)
2	(Slovakia)	DF	Radoslav Zabavník	8	0	0	0	8	0
4	(Israel)	DF	Ze'ev Haimovich	3	0	0	0	2	0
5	(Brazil)	DF	Cléber	8	0	0	0	8	0
6	(Romania)	MF	Andrei Mărgăritescu	6	0	0	0	6	0
7	(Bulgaria)	MF	Blagoy Georgiev	7	0	0	0	7	0
8	(Romania)	FW	Daniel Pancu	6	1	0	0	6	1
10	(Russia)	FW	Shamil Lakhiyalov	4	0	1	0	5	0
11	(Romania)	MF	Florentin Petre	4	0	1	0	5	0
13	(Russia)	FW	Zaur Sadayev	3	0	0	0	3	0
14	(Bulgaria)	DF	Valentin Iliev	3	0	1	0	4	0
17	(Russia)	MF	Adlan Katsayev	2	0	0	0	2	0
18	(Russia)	DF	Timur Dzhabrailov	6	0	0	0	6	0
20	(Russia)	MF	Andrei Kobenko	7	0	1	0	8	0
22	(Georgia (country))	MF	Levan Gvazava	2	0	0	0	2	0
23	(Russia)	DF	Sergei Bendz	0	0	1	0	1	0
26	(Georgia (country))	MF	Gogita Gogua	4	0	0	0	4	0
28	(Belarus)	DF	Syarhey Amelyanchuk	4	0	1	0	5	0
31	(Ukraine)	GK	Andriy Dykan	2	0	0	0	2	0
40	(Russia)	DF	Rizvan Utsiyev	3	0	0	0	3	0
Players away on loan:
16	(Russia)	FW	Igor Shevchenko	1	0	0	0	1	0
24	(Russia)	MF	Dmitri A. Smirnov	4	0	0	0	4	0
Players who left Terek Grozny during the season:
3	(Russia)	DF	Mikhail Mishchenko	2	1	0	0	2	1
			TOTALS	89	2	6	0	95	2
