= 2013–14 FC Terek Grozny season =

Russian football club in 2013–2014

Terek Grozny
2013–14 season
- Chairman: Ramzan Kadyrov
- Manager: Yuri Krasnozhan; 26 May – 28 October 2013; Vait Talgayev; 29 October – 7 November 2013; Rashid Rakhimov; 7 November 2013 –
- Stadium: Akhmad Arena
- Russian Premier League: 12th
- Russian Cup: Quarter-finals vs CSKA Moscow
- Top goalscorer: League: Aílton (8); All: Two Players (8)
- Highest home attendance: 24,320 vs Kuban Krasnodar (23 March 2014
- Lowest home attendance: 12,350 vs Tom Tomsk (8 December 2013
- Average home league attendance: 17,968
| Home colours | Away colours |

The 2013–14 FC Terek Grozny season was the sixth successive season that Terek played in the Russian Premier League, the highest tier of football in Russia. They finished the season in 12th place and reached the Quarter-finals of the Russian Cup where they were defeated by CSKA Moscow.

Terek Grozny appointed Yuri Krasnozhan during pre-season, following the expiration of Stanislav Cherchesov contract. On 28 October 2013 Krasnozhan resigned as manager of Terek with them 14th in the table, Vait Talgayev was appointed as a caretaker manager the following day. After a week with Vait Talgayev in charge, Terek appointed Rashid Rakhimov as their permanent successor to Yuri Krasnozhan.

== Squad ==
As of match played 15 May 2014

| No. | Name | Nationality | Position | Date of birth (age) | Signed from | Signed in | Contract ends | Apps. | Goals |
Goalkeepers
| 1 | Yaroslav Hodzyur | (Ukraine) | GK | 6 March 1985 (aged 29) | Dynamo-2 Kyiv | 2008 | | 66 | 0 |
| 16 | Yevgeni Gorodov | (Russia) | GK | 13 December 1985 (aged 28) | Krasnodar | 2013 | | 11 | 0 |
| 33 | Vitali Gudiyev | (Russia) | GK | 22 April 1995 (aged 19) | Alania Vladikavkaz | 2014 | | 0 | 0 |
| 51 | Yevgeni Kobozev | (Russia) | GK | 11 January 1990 (aged 24) | Ufa | 2013 | | 0 | 0 |
Defenders
| 4 | Juhani Ojala | (Finland) | DF | 19 June 1989 (aged 24) | Young Boys | 2013 | | 24 | 0 |
| 5 | Antonio Ferreira | (Brazil) | DF | 24 October 1984 (aged 29) | Spartak Nalchik | 2010 | | 101 | 3 |
| 13 | Fyodor Kudryashov | (Russia) | DF | 5 April 1987 (aged 27) | Spartak Moscow | 2012 | | 34 | 0 |
| 15 | Andrei Semyonov | (Russia) | DF | 24 March 1989 (aged 25) | Amkar Perm | 2013 | | 13 | 1 |
| 17 | Ivan Temnikov | (Russia) | DF | 28 January 1989 (aged 25) | loan from Rubin Kazan | 2013 | | 12 | 0 |
| 24 | Marcin Komorowski | (Poland) | DF | 17 April 1984 (aged 30) | Legia Warsaw | 2012 | | 57 | 4 |
| 40 | Rizvan Utsiyev | (Russia) | DF | 7 February 1988 (aged 26) | Trainee | 2005 | | | |
| 90 | Murad Tagilov | (Russia) | DF | 27 January 1990 (aged 24) | Trainee | 2008 | | 6 | 0 |
Midfielders
| 6 | Adílson | (Brazil) | MF | 16 January 1987 (aged 27) | Grêmio | 2011 | | 54 | 1 |
| 8 | Maurício | (Brazil) | MF | 21 October 1988 (aged 25) | Fluminense | 2010 | | 125 | 22 |
| 10 | Kanu | (Brazil) | MF | 23 September 1987 (aged 26) | Anderlecht | 2013 | | 34 | 2 |
| 14 | Ismaïl Aissati | (Morocco) | MF | 16 August 1988 (aged 25) | Antalyaspor | 2013 | | 13 | 0 |
| 19 | Oleg Ivanov | (Russia) | MF | 4 August 1986 (aged 27) | Rostov | 2012 | | 71 | 7 |
| 23 | Facundo Píriz | (Uruguay) | MF | 27 March 1990 (aged 24) | Nacional | 2013 | 2017 | 22 | 1 |
| 31 | Maciej Rybus | (Poland) | MF | 19 August 1989 (aged 24) | Legia Warsaw | 2012 | | 50 | 7 |
| 55 | Igor Lebedenko | (Russia) | MF | 27 May 1983 (aged 30) | Rubin Kazan | 2012 | | 73 | 11 |
Forwards
| 7 | Khalid Kadyrov | (Russia) | FW | 19 April 1994 (aged 20) | Trainee | 2010 | | 2 | 0 |
| 9 | Aílton | (Brazil) | FW | 20 August 1984 (aged 29) | APOEL | 2012 | 2015 | 56 | 16 |
| 18 | Jeremy Bokila | (Democratic Republic of the Congo) | FW | 14 November 1988 (aged 25) | Zulte Waregem | 2013 | | 22 | 8 |
| 30 | Gheorghe Grozav | (Romania) | FW | 10 September 1992 (aged 21) | Petrolul Ploiești | 2013 | | 10 | 1 |
| 95 | Magomed Mitrishev | (Russia) | FW | 10 September 1992 (aged 21) | Spartak Nalchik | 2012 | | 22 | 2 |
Out on Loan
| 11 | Zaur Sadayev | (Russia) | FW | 6 November 1989 (aged 24) | Trainee | 2006 | | | |
| 89 | Maciej Makuszewski | (Poland) | MF | 29 September 1989 (aged 24) | Jagiellonia Białystok | 2012 | 2015 | 16 | 0 |
| | Adlan Katsayev | (Russia) | MF | 20 February 1988 (aged 26) | Trainee | 2005 | | | |
Left During the Season
| 3 | Dmitri Yatchenko | (Russia) | DF | 25 August 1986 (aged 27) | Spartak Nalchik | 2010 | | 106 | 1 |
| 15 | Artsyom Radzkow | (Belarus) | DF | 26 August 1985 (aged 28) | loan from BATE Borisov | 2013 | | 8 | 0 |
| 99 | Jonathan Legear | (Belgium) | MF | 13 April 1987 (aged 27) | Anderlecht | 2011 | | 22 | 1 |

== Transfers ==
=== In ===
| Date | Position | Nationality | Name | From | Fee | Ref. |
|---|---|---|---|---|---|---|
| | GK | (Russia) | Yevgeni Gorodov | Krasnodar | Undisclosed | |
| | GK | (Russia) | Yevgeni Kobozev | Ufa | Undisclosed | |
| | DF | (Russia) | Aleksei Mamonov | Volga Nizhny Novgorod | Undisclosed | |
| | DF | (Russia) | Aleksandr Semyachkin | Volga Nizhny Novgorod | Undisclosed | |
| | MF | (Russia) | Artyom Bragin | Volga Nizhny Novgorod | Undisclosed | |
| 28 August 2013 | FW | (Democratic Republic of the Congo) | Jeremy Bokila | Zulte Waregem | Undisclosed | |
| 28 August 2013 | FW | (Romania) | Gheorghe Grozav | Petrolul Ploiești | Undisclosed | |
| 2 September 2013 | MF | (Morocco) | Ismaïl Aissati | Antalyaspor | Undisclosed | |
| 4 February 2014 | DF | (Russia) | Andrei Semyonov | Amkar Perm | Undisclosed | |
| 15 February 2014 | GK | (Russia) | Vitali Gudiyev | Alania Vladikavkaz | Undisclosed | |

=== Out ===
| Date | Position | Nationality | Name | To | Fee | Ref. |
|---|---|---|---|---|---|---|
| 29 December 2013 | DF | (Russia) | Dmitri Yatchenko | Krylia Sovetov | Undisclosed | |
| | DF | (Poland) | Piotr Polczak | Volga Nizhny Novgorod | Undisclosed | |
| | MF | (Belgium) | Jonathan Legear | KV Mechelen | Undisclosed | |
| | DF | (Czech Republic) | Martin Jiránek | Tom Tomsk | Undisclosed | |
| | MF | (Russia) | Aleksandr Pavlenko | Krylia Sovetov | Undisclosed | |
| | MF | (Russia) | Oleg Vlasov | Torpedo Moscow | Undisclosed | |
| | FW | (Russia) | Abdul-Khakim Matayev | Chernomorets Novorossiysk | Undisclosed | |

=== Loans in ===
| Date from | Position | Nationality | Name | From | Date to | Ref. |
|---|---|---|---|---|---|---|
| | DF | (Belarus) | Artsyom Radzkow | BATE Borisov | | |
| | DF | (Russia) | Ivan Temnikov | Rubin Kazan | End of Season | |

=== Loans out ===
| Date from | Position | Nationality | Name | To | Date to | Ref. |
|---|---|---|---|---|---|---|
| 3 July 2013 | FW | (Chad) | Ezechiel N'Douassel | Konyaspor | 31 December 2013 | |
| 23 July 2013 | MF | (Russia) | Adlan Katsayev | Luch-Energiya | | |
| 16 January 2014 | FW | (Chad) | Ezechiel N'Douassel | Club Africain | End of Season | |
| 29 January 2014 | MF | (Poland) | Maciej Makuszewski | Lechia Gdańsk | End of Season | |
| 29 January 2014 | FW | (Russia) | Zaur Sadayev | Lechia Gdańsk | End of Season | |

== Competitions ==
=== Russian Premier League ===
==== Results by round ====
| Round | 1 | 2 | 3 | 4 | 5 | 6 | 7 | 8 | 9 | 10 | 11 | 12 | 13 | 14 | 15 | 16 | 17 | 18 | 19 | 20 | 21 | 22 | 23 | 24 | 25 | 26 | 27 | 28 | 29 | 30 |
|---|---|---|---|---|---|---|---|---|---|---|---|---|---|---|---|---|---|---|---|---|---|---|---|---|---|---|---|---|---|---|
| Ground | A | H | H | A | H | A | H | A | H | A | H | A | H | A | H | A | A | H | H | H | A | H | A | A | H | A | H | A | H | A |
| Result | L | D | D | L | L | L | D | L | L | L | W | D | D | D | L | L | L | D | W | W | L | W | W | D | W | L | W | L | W | D |
| Position | 15 | 13 | 13 | 15 | 14 | 14 | 14 | 15 | 16 | 16 | 16 | 14 | 13 | 13 | 14 | 15 | 15 | 15 | 14 | 14 | 15 | 14 | 13 | 13 | 11 | 12 | 11 | 11 | 11 | 12 |

Updated to match(es) played on 16 May 2014. Source: Russian Premier League
A = Away; H = Home; W = Win; D = Draw; L = Loss

==== Results ====
| 15 July 2013 1 | Rostov | 2–1 | Terek Grozny | Rostov-on-Don |
| 20:00 MSK (UTC+4) | Gațcan (yellow card) 26'; Kanga (yellow card) 32'; Pletikosa (yellow card) 71'; Sheshukov (yellow card) 83'; Dzyuba 89' (pen.), 90+2' | Report | Adílson (yellow card) 37'; Aílton 71' (pen.); Makuszewski (yellow card) 77' | Stadium: Olimp-2; Attendance: 9,500; Referee: Maksim Layushkin |

| 20 July 2013 2 | Terek Grozny | 1–1 | Amkar Perm | Grozny |
| 21:00 MSK (UTC+4) | Lebedenko 13'; Legear (yellow card) 45+2'; Sadayev (yellow card) 85' | Report | Jakubko (yellow card) 40' (goal) 55'; Kanunnikov (yellow card) 41'; Zanev (yellow card) 68'; Belorukov (yellow card) 70'; Cherenchikov (yellow card) 90+3' | Stadium: Akhmat-Arena; Attendance: 13,375; Referee: Vladimir Kazmenko |

| 28 July 2013 3 | Terek Grozny | 0–0 | Rubin Kazan | Grozny |
| 21:00 MSK (UTC+4) | Temnikov (yellow card) 70' | Report | Kulik (yellow card) 42'; Kuzmin (yellow card) 65'; Ansaldi (yellow card) 74'; M'Vila (yellow card) 82' | Stadium: Akhmat-Arena; Attendance: 14,300; Referee: Sergey Ivanov |

| 3 August 2013 4 | Dynamo Moscow | 1–0 | Terek Grozny | Khimki |
| 18:30 MSK (UTC+4) | Yusupov (yellow card) 19'; Noboa 71'; Chicherin (yellow card) 74' | Report | Lebedenko (yellow card) 37'; Aílton (yellow card) 62' | Stadium: Arena Khimki; Attendance: 5,893; Referee: Igor Nizovtsev |

| 17 August 2013 5 | Terek Grozny | 0–1 | Lokomotiv Moscow | Grozny |
| 20:30 MSK (UTC+4) | Ferreira (yellow card) 36'; Makuszewski (yellow card) 40'; Kanu (yellow card) 90+1' | Report | Tsiharaw (yellow card) 36'; Maicon (yellow card) 40'; Tarasov (yellow card) 90+1'; Samedov 90+2' | Stadium: Akhmat-Arena; Attendance: 18,972; Referee: Sergey Kuznetsov |

| 24 August 2013 6 | Volga Nizhny Novgorod | 1–0 | Terek Grozny | Nizhny Novgorod |
| 18:30 MSK (UTC+4) | Putsila (yellow card) 42' (goal) 75'; Karyaka (yellow card) 60'; Mukendi (yellow card) 77'; Sychev (yellow card) 87'; Bulgaru (yellow card) 90+3' | Report | Ojala (yellow card) 59'; Temnikov (yellow card) 66'; Lebedenko (yellow card) 90+3' | Stadium: Lokomotiv Stadium; Attendance: 5,100; Referee: Vitali Meshkov |

| 31 August 2013 7 | Terek Grozny | 1–1 | Anzhi Makhachkala | Grozny |
| 18:45 MSK (UTC+4) | Sadayev (yellow card) 71'; Aílton 87' (pen.); Utsiyev (yellow card) 90' | Report | Ewerton 33' (yellow card) 64'; Solomatin (yellow card) 61'; Traoré (yellow card) 83'; Maksimov (yellow card) 90+1' | Stadium: Akhmat-Arena; Attendance: 16,700; Referee: Sergei Karasev |

| 14 September 2013 8 | Zenit St.Petersburg | 2–0 | Terek Grozny | Saint Petersburg |
| 20:15 MSK (UTC+4) | Kerzhakov 21'; Danny 42' | Report | Aissati (yellow card) 34'; Ivanov (yellow card) 56'; Kudryashov (yellow card) 63' | Stadium: Petrovsky Stadium; Attendance: 20,520; Referee: Vyacheslav Kharlamov |

| 21 September 2013 9 | Terek Grozny | 0–1 | Krasnodar | Grozny |
| 18:30 MSK (UTC+4) | Adílson (yellow card) 26'; Utsiyev (yellow card) 62' | Report | Mamayev 14'; Abreu (yellow card) 34'; Filtsov (yellow card) 84' | Stadium: Akhmat-Arena; Attendance: 17,735; Referee: Aleksei Eskov |

| 25 September 2013 10 | Kuban Krasnodar | 3–1 | Terek Grozny | Krasnodar |
| 19:00 MSK (UTC+4) | Bucur 6'; Baldé 44' (yellow card) 45'; Xandão 66' | Report | Maurício 2'; Radzkow (yellow card) 28'; Lebedenko (yellow card) 69' | Stadium: Kuban Stadium; Attendance: 7,310; Referee: Vladislav Bezborodov |

| 28 September 2013 11 | Terek Grozny | 2–0 | CSKA Moscow | Grozny |
| 16:00 MSK (UTC+4) | Kanu 19' (yellow card) 20'; Aissati (yellow card) 38'; Legear (yellow card) 45'; Lebedenko 75'; Ivanov (yellow card) 89' | Report | Wernbloom (yellow card) 79' | Stadium: Akhmat-Arena; Attendance: 16,820; Referee: Sergey Ivanov |

| 6 October 2013 12 | Spartak Moscow | 0–0 | Terek Grozny | Yekaterinburg |
| 13:30 MSK (UTC+4) | | Report | Adílson (yellow card) 20'; Temnikov (yellow card) 74' | Stadium: Central Stadium; Attendance: 10,500; Referee: Igor Nizovtsev |

| 19 October 2013 13 | Terek Grozny | 1–1 | Ural Sverdlovsk Oblast | Grozny |
| 13:30 MSK (UTC+4) | Maurício 25'; Radzkow (yellow card) 49'; Adílson (yellow card) 66' | Report | Ottesen (yellow card) 13'; Solosin (yellow card) 37'; Belozyorov (yellow card) 38'; Acevedo 67' (pen.) | Stadium: Akhmat-Arena; Attendance: 14,720; Referee: Vladislav Bezborodov |

| 26 October 2013 14 | Tom Tomsk | 0–0 | Terek Grozny | Tomsk |
| 12:30 MSK (UTC+4) | Milanov (yellow card) 44'; Ignatovich (yellow card) 82' | Report | Kudryashov (yellow card) 20' (yellow-red card) 74' | Stadium: Trud Stadium; Attendance: 4,200; Referee: Aleksei Nikolaev |

| 4 November 2013 15 | Terek Grozny | 0–1 | Krylia Sovetov | Grozny |
| 16:00 MSK (UTC+4) | | Report | Kornilenko 35'; Goreux (yellow card) 84'; Mucha (yellow card) 89' | Stadium: Akhmat-Arena; Attendance: 13,420; Referee: Alexander Yegorov |

| 10 November 2013 16 | CSKA Moscow | 4–1 | Terek Grozny | Moscow |
| 15:45 MSK (UTC+4) | Doumbia 9', 38' (pen.); Tošić 20'; Ignashevich 24'; Elm (yellow card) 52' | Report | Ferreira (yellow card) 10'; Kanu (yellow card) 30'; Aissati (yellow card) 39'; Aílton 72'; Ivanov (yellow card) 90' | Stadium: Eduard Streltsov Stadium; Attendance: 8,500; Referee: Sergei Karasev |
Note: The match was moved to the Eduard Streltsov Stadium, Moscow due to the poor quality of the pitch at Arena Khimki, Khimki.

| 25 November 2013 17 | Krasnodar | 3–2 | Terek Grozny | Krasnodar |
| 19:00 MSK (UTC+4) | Komorowski 36' (o.g.); Mamayev 66'; Wánderson (yellow card) 45' (goal) 74' | Report | Maurício (yellow card) 4'; Ivanov 38', 67'; Ferreira (yellow card) 45'; Aílton (yellow card) 77' | Stadium: Kuban Stadium; Attendance: 4,100; Referee: Timur Arslanbekov |

| 1 December 2013 18 | Terek Grozny | 1–1 | Zenit St. Petersburg | Grozny |
| 13:50 MSK (UTC+4) | Lebedenko 51'; Rybus (yellow card) 65'; Utsiev (yellow card) 75' | Report | Fayzulin (yellow card) 42'; Smolnikov (yellow card) 67'; Witsel 78' | Stadium: Akhmat-Arena; Attendance: 20,730; Referee: Sergei Ivanov |

| 8 December 2013 19 | Terek Grozny | 2–0 | Tom Tomsk | Grozny |
| 16:30 MSK (UTC+4) | Bokila 20' (yellow card) 70'; Kudryashov (yellow card) 30'; Aílton 90+3' (pen.) | Report | Kisenkov (yellow card) 11' (yellow-red card) 73'; Bardachow (yellow card) 45+1'; Rykov (yellow card) 54'; Saláta (yellow card) 65'; Ignatovich (yellow card) 67'; Vašek (red card) 90+1' | Stadium: Akhmat-Arena; Attendance: 12,350; Referee: Alexander Yegorov |

| 8 March 2014 20 | Terek Grozny | 1–0 | Spartak Moscow | Grozny |
| 19:00 MSK (UTC+4) | Maurício 1'; Utsiev (yellow card) 54'; Ivanov (yellow card) 79'; Grozav (yellow card) 80' | Report | Jurado (yellow card) 54'; Costa (yellow card) 59' | Stadium: Akhmat-Arena; Attendance: 19,700; Referee: Vitali Meshkov |

| 14 March 2014 21 | Ural Sverdlovsk Oblast | 2–1 | Terek Grozny | Yekaterinburg |
| 17:00 MSK (UTC+4) | Acevedo (yellow card) 33'; Ottesen (yellow card) 63'; Manucharyan (yellow card) 82' (goal) 88', 90+3' | Report | Kudryashov (red card) 11'; Hodzyur (yellow card) 75'; Maurício 90+1' | Stadium: Central Stadium; Attendance: 2,680; Referee: Aleksei Eskov |

| 23 March 2014 22 | Terek Grozny | 2–1 | Kuban Krasnodar | Grozny |
| 18:30 MSK (UTC+4) | Aílton 33' (pen.); Komorowski (yellow card) 54' (goal) 59'; Hodzyur (yellow card) 90+4' | Report | Kaboré (yellow card) 28'; Dealbert (yellow card) 33'; Melgarejo 66'; Popov (yellow card) 83'; Sosnin (yellow card) 90+4' | Stadium: Akhmat-Arena; Attendance: 24,320; Referee: Aleksei Nikolaev |

| 31 March 2014 23 | Krylia Sovetov | Postponed | Terek Grozny | Samara |
| 18:30 MSK (UTC+4) | | Report | | Stadium: Metallurg Stadium; Referee: Timur Arslanbekov |
Note: The Krylia Sovetov v Terek Grozny match was originally scheduled to be played on 31 March 2014 at 18:30 MSK, but was postponed till 1 April 2014 due to heavy snowfall. On 1 April, the game was again postponed due to the condition of the pitch, with a new re-arranged date and location of 8 April at Rubin Kazan's home ground of Central Stadium.

| 5 April 2014 24 | Amkar Perm | 0–1 | Terek Grozny | Perm |
| 15:00 MSK (UTC+4) | Georgiev (yellow card) 45+1'; Ogude (yellow card) 54'; Twumasi (yellow card) 69'; Gol (yellow card) 87' | Report | Lebedenko (yellow card) 38'; Ivanov 42' (yellow card) 64'; Adílson (yellow card) 63'; Rybus (yellow card) 76' | Stadium: Zvezda Stadium; Attendance: 7,500; Referee: Vyacheslav Kharlamov |

| 8 April 2014 23 | Krylia Sovetov | 1–1 | Terek Grozny | Kazan |
| 19:00 MSK (UTC+4) | Goreux (yellow card) 35'; Caballero 44' | Report | Bokila 40'; Rybus (yellow card) 90+1'; Ivanov (yellow card) 90+2' | Stadium: Central Stadium; Attendance: 443; Referee: Igor Fedotov |
Note: Match was originally scheduled to be played on 31 March 2014 at 18:30 MSK. Match played in Kazan due to the adverse weather conditions in Samara.

| 12 April 2014 25 | Terek Grozny | 3–0 | Rostov | Grozny |
| 17:00 MSK (UTC+4) | Ivanov (yellow card) 12'; Maurício 25' (pen.); Utsiev (yellow card) 37' (yellow-red card) 42'; Aílton 41', 78' (pen.); Bokila (yellow card) 64' | Summary | Lolo (yellow card) 18'; Kanga (red card) 34'; Gabulov (yellow card) 73'; Dzyuba (penalty missed) 86'; Bastos (yellow card) 89' | Stadium: Akhmat-Arena; Attendance: 21,720; Referee: Sergei Karasev |

| 19 April 2014 26 | Lokomotiv Moscow | 2–1 | Terek Grozny | Moscow |
| 15:30 MSK (UTC+4) | Denisov (yellow card) 14'; Pavlyuchenko 72', 80' (yellow card) 81'; Boussoufa (yellow card) 86'; Ćorluka (yellow card) 90' | Report | Maurício (yellow card) 29'; Aílton 30'; Komorowski (yellow card) 37'; Lebedenko (yellow card) 55'; Temnikov (yellow card) 62' | Stadium: Lokomotiv Stadium; Attendance: 8,625; Referee: Sergey Lapochkin |

| 27 April 2014 27 | Terek Grozny | 1–0 | Dynamo Moscow | Grozny |
| 18:30 MSK (UTC+4) | Maurício 54'; Píriz (yellow card) 82' | Report | Douglas (yellow card) 34'; Samba (yellow card) 45+1'; Yusupov (yellow card) 63' | Stadium: Akhmat-Arena; Attendance: 22,700; Referee: Alexander Yegorov |

| 4 May 2014 28 | Anzhi Makhachkala | 3–0 | Terek Grozny | Kaspiysk |
| 19:00 MSK (UTC+4) | Bystrov 6'; Grigalava 33'; Maksimov (yellow card) 47'; Gadzhibekov (yellow card) 52'; Bilyaletdinov 60' | Report | Komorowski (yellow card) 11'; Hodzyur (yellow card) 32' | Stadium: Anzhi Arena; Attendance: 11,150; Referee: Sergei Ivanov |

| 10 May 2014 29 | Terek Grozny | 2–0 | Volga Nizhny Novgorod | Grozny |
| 20:00 MSK (UTC+4) | Semyonov (yellow card) 32'; Utsiev (yellow card) 68'; Ivanov 74'; Komorowski (yellow card) 84'; Bokila 90+2' | Report | Kontsedalov (yellow card) 45+1'; Chicherin (yellow card) 65'; Putsila (yellow card) 76'; Kolodin (red card) 79'; Aleksandr Shlenkin (yellow card) 90' | Stadium: Akhmat-Arena; Attendance: 22,720; Referee: Sergey Lapochkin |

| 15 May 2014 30 | Rubin Kazan | 1–1 | Terek Grozny | Kazan |
| 18:30 MSK (UTC+4) | Wakaso (yellow card) 31'; Kuzmin (yellow card) 55'; Mullin 60' | Report | Aissati (yellow card) 35'; Píriz (yellow card) 57'; Semyonov 58'; Ojala (yellow card) 76'; Ivanov (yellow card) 76' | Stadium: Central Stadium; Attendance: 3,887; Referee: Vladislav Bezborodov |

==== League table ====
| Pos | Team | Pld | W | D | L | GF | GA | GD | Pts | Qualification or relegation |
|---|---|---|---|---|---|---|---|---|---|---|
| 10 | Amkar Perm | 30 | 9 | 11 | 10 | 36 | 37 | −1 | 38 (Note: Rubin Kazan ahead of Amkar Perm on head-to-head points; Rubin Kazan–Amkar Perm 3–0, Amkar Perm–Rubin Kazan 0–0.) | |
| 11 | Ural Sverdlovsk Oblast | 30 | 9 | 7 | 14 | 28 | 46 | −18 | 34 | |
| 12 | Terek Grozny | 30 | 8 | 9 | 13 | 27 | 33 | −6 | 33 | |
| 13 | Tom Tomsk (R) | 30 | 8 | 7 | 15 | 23 | 39 | −16 | 31 | Qualification for the Relegation play-offs |
| 14 | Krylia Sovetov Samara (R) | 30 | 6 | 11 | 13 | 27 | 46 | −19 | 29 | Qualification for the Relegation play-offs |

Source: Russian Premier League
Rules for classification: 1) points; 2) number of wins; 3) head-to-head points; 4) number of head-to-head wins; 5) head-to-head goal difference; 6) number of head-to-head goals scored; 7) number of head-to-head away goals scored; 8) goal difference; 9) number of goals scored; 10) number of away goals scored; 11) position in the 2012–13 season (only used until all the regularly scheduled games have been played); 11) extra play-off game or tournament between the teams in question.
(R) Relegated

=== Russian Cup ===
| 31 October 2013 Round of 32 | Neftekhimik Nizhnekamsk | 1–4 | Terek Grozny | Nizhnekamsk |
| 16:30 MSK (UTC+4) | Nesterenko (red card) 11'; Drannikov 43'; Sackey (yellow card) 49' (yellow-red card) 52' | Summary | Maurício 12' (pen.); Grozav 18'; Sadaev (yellow card) 36' (yellow-red card) 49'; Bokila 55', 85' | Stadium: Neftekhimik Stadium; Attendance: 1,700; Referee: Anton Anopa |

| 1 March 2014 Round of 16 | Terek Grozny | 3–2 | Mordovia Saransk | Grozny |
| 15:00 MSK (UTC+4) | Bokila 45', 67', 89' | Summary | Samodin 70'; Bobyor 80' | Stadium: Akhmad Arena; Attendance: 17,200; Referee: Igor Fedotov |

| 27 March 2014 Quarter-Finals | CSKA Moscow | 1–0 (a.e.t.) | Terek Grozny | Moscow |
| 20:00 MSK (UTC+4) | Schennikov 111' | Summary | Komorowski (red card) 79' | Stadium: Arena Khimki; Attendance: 6,000; Referee: Vladislav Bezborodov |

== Squad statistics ==
As of match played 15 May 2014

=== Appearances and goals ===
| No. | Pos | Nat | Player | Total | | Premier League | | Russian Cup | |
| No. | Pos | Nat | Player | Apps | Goals | Apps | Goals | Apps | Goals |
|---|---|---|---|---|---|---|---|---|---|
| 1 | GK | (Ukraine) UKR | Yaroslav Hodzyur | 22 | 0 | 19 | 0 | 3 | 0 |
| 4 | DF | (Finland) FIN | Juhani Ojala | 21 | 0 | 19+1 | 0 | 1 | 0 |
| 5 | DF | (Brazil) BRA | Antonio Ferreira | 19 | 0 | 19 | 0 | 0 | 0 |
| 6 | MF | (Brazil) BRA | Adílson | 21 | 0 | 17+1 | 0 | 2+1 | 0 |
| 7 | FW | (Russia) RUS | Khalid Kadyrov | 2 | 0 | 1+1 | 0 | 0 | 0 |
| 8 | MF | (Brazil) BRA | Maurício | 32 | 7 | 23+6 | 6 | 3 | 1 |
| 9 | FW | (Brazil) BRA | Aílton | 31 | 8 | 21+8 | 8 | 0+2 | 0 |
| 10 | MF | (Brazil) BRA | Kanu | 28 | 1 | 11+14 | 1 | 2+1 | 0 |
| 13 | DF | (Russia) RUS | Fyodor Kudryashov | 17 | 0 | 14+1 | 0 | 2 | 0 |
| 14 | MF | (Morocco) MAR | Ismail Aissati | 13 | 0 | 10+3 | 0 | 0 | 0 |
| 15 | DF | (Russia) RUS | Andrei Semyonov | 13 | 1 | 11 | 1 | 2 | 0 |
| 16 | GK | (Russia) RUS | Yevgeni Gorodov | 11 | 0 | 11 | 0 | 0 | 0 |
| 17 | DF | (Russia) RUS | Ivan Temnikov | 12 | 0 | 10+1 | 0 | 1 | 0 |
| 18 | FW | (Democratic Republic of the Congo) COD | Jeremy Bokila | 22 | 8 | 9+10 | 3 | 2+1 | 5 |
| 19 | MF | (Russia) RUS | Oleg Ivanov | 32 | 4 | 27+2 | 4 | 1+2 | 0 |
| 21 | MF | (Russia) RUS | Daler Kuzyaev | 1 | 0 | 0+1 | 0 | 0 | 0 |
| 23 | MF | (Uruguay) URU | Facundo Píriz | 16 | 0 | 11+4 | 0 | 1 | 0 |
| 24 | DF | (Poland) POL | Marcin Komorowski | 20 | 1 | 16+2 | 1 | 2 | 0 |
| 30 | FW | (Romania) ROU | Gheorghe Grozav | 10 | 1 | 2+5 | 0 | 2+1 | 1 |
| 31 | MF | (Poland) POL | Maciej Rybus | 18 | 0 | 14+2 | 0 | 2 | 0 |
| 40 | DF | (Russia) RUS | Rizvan Utsiev | 24 | 0 | 22 | 0 | 2 | 0 |
| 55 | MF | (Russia) RUS | Igor Lebedenko | 30 | 3 | 22+5 | 3 | 2+1 | 0 |
| 90 | DF | (Russia) RUS | Murad Tagilov | 3 | 0 | 0+3 | 0 | 0 | 0 |
| 95 | FW | (Russia) RUS | Magomed Mitrishev | 2 | 0 | 0+2 | 0 | 0 | 0 |
Players away from Terek Grozny on loan:
| 11 | FW | (Russia) RUS | Zaur Sadaev | 8 | 1 | 4+3 | 0 | 1 | 1 |
| 89 | MF | (Poland) POL | Maciej Makuszewski | 5 | 0 | 4+1 | 0 | 0 | 0 |
Players who appeared for Terek Grozny no longer at the club:
| 3 | DF | (Russia) RUS | Dmitri Yatchenko | 8 | 0 | 3+4 | 0 | 1 | 0 |
| 15 | DF | (Belarus) BLR | Artsyom Radzkow | 8 | 0 | 5+2 | 0 | 1 | 0 |
| 99 | MF | (Belgium) BEL | Jonathan Legear | 6 | 0 | 4+2 | 0 | 0 | 0 |

=== Goal scorers ===
| Place | Position | Nation | Number | Name | Premier League | Russian Cup | Total |
|---|---|---|---|---|---|---|---|
| 1 | FW | (Brazil) | 9 | Aílton | 8 | 0 | 8 |
| 1 | FW | (Democratic Republic of the Congo) | 18 | Jeremy Bokila | 3 | 5 | 8 |
| 3 | MF | (Brazil) | 8 | Maurício | 6 | 1 | 7 |
| 4 | MF | (Russia) | 19 | Oleg Ivanov | 4 | 0 | 4 |
| 5 | MF | (Russia) | 55 | Igor Lebedenko | 3 | 0 | 3 |
| 6 | MF | (Brazil) | 10 | Kanu | 1 | 0 | 1 |
| 6 | DF | (Poland) | 24 | Marcin Komorowski | 1 | 0 | 1 |
| 6 | DF | (Russia) | 15 | Andrei Semyonov | 1 | 0 | 1 |
| 6 | MF | (Romania) | 30 | Gheorghe Grozav | 0 | 1 | 1 |
| | | | | TOTALS | 27 | 7 | 34 |

=== Clean sheets ===
| Place | Position | Nation | Number | Name | Premier League | Russian Cup | Total |
|---|---|---|---|---|---|---|---|
| 1 | GK | (Ukraine) | 1 | Yaroslav Hodzyur | 7 | 0 | 7 |
| 2 | GK | (Russia) | 16 | Yevgeni Gorodov | 3 | 0 | 3 |
| | | | | TOTALS | 10 | 0 | 10 |

=== Disciplinary record ===
| Number | Nation | Position | Name | Premier League | | Russian Cup | | Total | |
| Number | Nation | Position | Name | Yellow card | Red card | Yellow card | Red card | Yellow card | Red card |
| 1 | (Ukraine) | GK | Yaroslav Hodzyur | 2 | 0 | 0 | 0 | 2 | 0 |
| 4 | (Finland) | DF | Juhani Ojala | 2 | 0 | 0 | 0 | 2 | 0 |
| 5 | (Brazil) | DF | Antonio Ferreira | 3 | 0 | 0 | 0 | 3 | 0 |
| 6 | (Brazil) | MF | Adílson | 5 | 0 | 0 | 0 | 5 | 0 |
| 8 | (Brazil) | MF | Maurício | 2 | 0 | 1 | 0 | 3 | 0 |
| 9 | (Brazil) | FW | Aílton | 2 | 0 | 0 | 0 | 2 | 0 |
| 10 | (Brazil) | MF | Kanu | 2 | 0 | 1 | 0 | 3 | 0 |
| 13 | (Russia) | DF | Fyodor Kudryashov | 4 | 2 | 1 | 0 | 5 | 2 |
| 14 | (Morocco) | MF | Ismaïl Aissati | 4 | 0 | 0 | 0 | 4 | 0 |
| 15 | (Russia) | DF | Andrei Semyonov | 1 | 0 | 0 | 0 | 1 | 0 |
| 17 | (Russia) | DF | Ivan Temnikov | 4 | 0 | 1 | 0 | 5 | 0 |
| 18 | (Democratic Republic of the Congo) | FW | Jeremy Bokila | 2 | 0 | 0 | 0 | 2 | 0 |
| 19 | (Russia) | MF | Oleg Ivanov | 7 | 0 | 1 | 0 | 8 | 0 |
| 23 | (Uruguay) | MF | Facundo Píriz | 2 | 0 | 0 | 0 | 2 | 0 |
| 24 | (Poland) | DF | Marcin Komorowski | 4 | 0 | 0 | 1 | 4 | 1 |
| 30 | (Romania) | MF | Gheorghe Grozav | 1 | 0 | 0 | 0 | 1 | 0 |
| 31 | (Poland) | MF | Maciej Rybus | 3 | 0 | 0 | 0 | 3 | 0 |
| 40 | (Russia) | DF | Rizvan Utsiev | 6 | 1 | 1 | 0 | 7 | 1 |
| 55 | (Russia) | MF | Igor Lebedenko | 5 | 0 | 1 | 0 | 6 | 0 |
Players away on loan:
| 11 | (Russia) | FW | Zaur Sadayev | 1 | 0 | 2 | 1 | 3 | 1 |
| 89 | (Poland) | MF | Maciej Makuszewski | 2 | 0 | 0 | 0 | 2 | 0 |
Players who left Terek Grozny during the season:
| 15 | (Belarus) | DF | Artsyom Radzkow | 2 | 0 | 0 | 0 | 2 | 0 |
| 99 | (Belgium) | MF | Jonathan Legear | 2 | 0 | 0 | 0 | 2 | 0 |
| | | | TOTALS | 67 | 3 | 9 | 2 | 76 | 5 |

== Notes ==
1. The Krylia Sovetov v Terek Grozny match was originally scheduled to be played on 31 March 2014 at 18:30 MSK, but was postponed till 1 April 2014 due to heavy snowfall. On 1 April, the game was again postponed due to the condition of the pitch, with a new re-arranged date and location of 8 April at Rubin Kazan's home ground of Central Stadium.
