= Ramzan Asayev =

Russian footballer (born 1993)

Personal information
- Full name: Ramzan Ismailovich Asayev
- Date of birth: 27 February 1993 (age 33)
- Height: 1.81 m (5 ft 11 in)
- Position: Goalkeeper

Senior career*
Years	Team	Apps	(Gls)
2010–2016	FC Terek Grozny	0	(0)
2013–2016	FC Terek-2 Grozny	59	(0)
- * Club domestic league appearances and goals

Ramzan Ismailovich Asayev (Russian: Рамзан Исмаилович Асаев; born 27 February 1993) is a former Russian football goalkeeper.

== Career ==
Asayev made his professional debut for FC Terek Grozny on 13 July 2010 in the Russian Cup game against FC Luch-Energiya Vladivostok.
