= Zaur Sadayev =

Russian footballer (born 1989)

Zaur Sadayev Заур Садаев
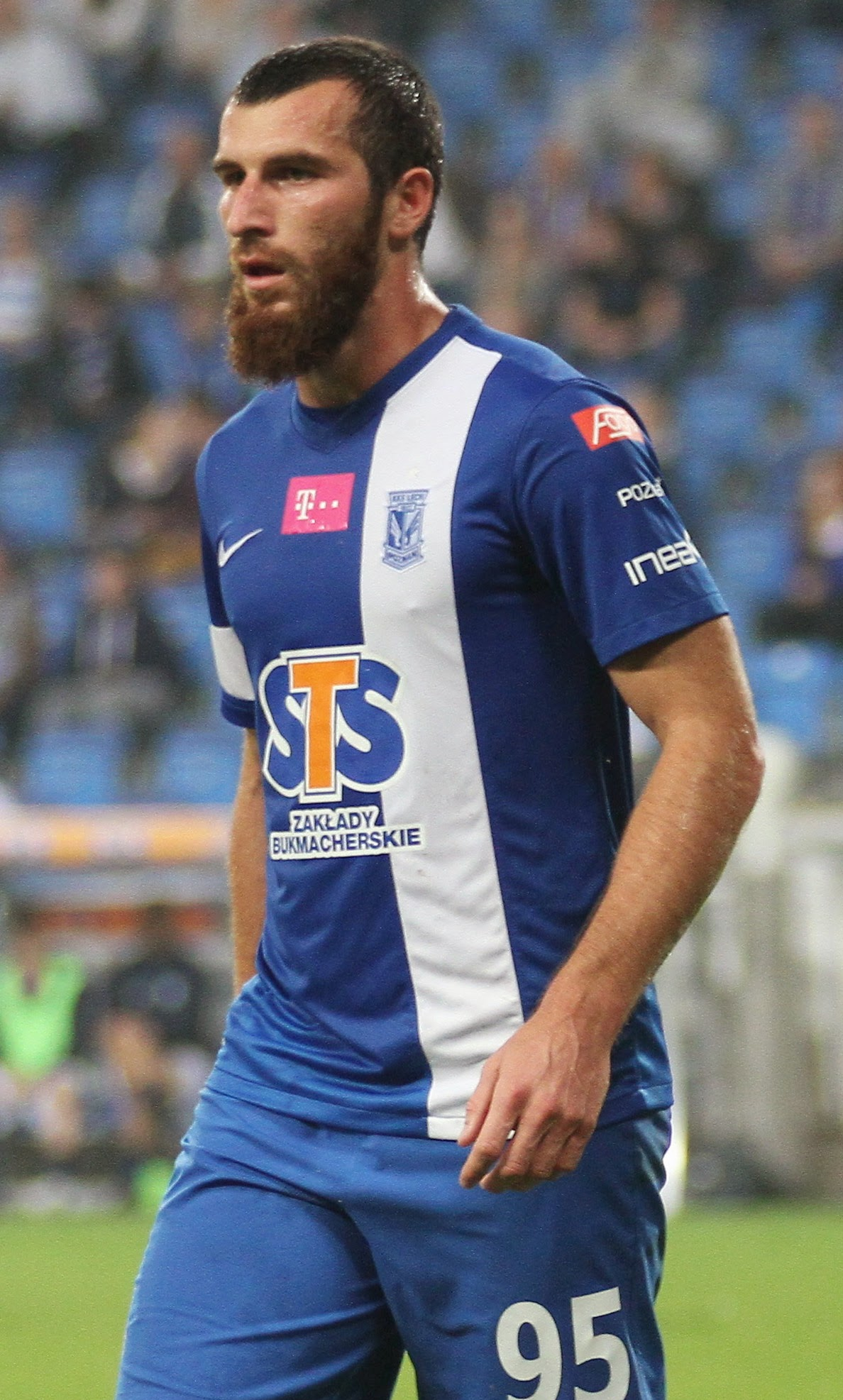
- Sadayev with Lech Poznań in 2014

Personal information
- Full name: Zaur Umarovich Sadayev
- Date of birth: 6 November 1989 (age 37)
- Place of birth: Shali, Russian SFSR
- Height: 1.82 m (6 ft 0 in)
- Position: Attacking midfielder

Youth career
- Akhmat Grozny

Senior career*
Years	Team	Apps	(Gls)
2006–2019	Akhmat Grozny	130	(18)
2013	→ Beitar Jerusalem (loan)	7	(1)
2014	→ Lechia Gdańsk (loan)	16	(3)
2014	→ Lechia Gdańsk II (loan)	2	(0)
2014–2015	→ Lech Poznań (loan)	25	(5)
2019	→ Ankaragücü (loan)	7	(0)
2019–2020	Ankaragücü	5	(0)
2021	Helmond Sport	4	(0)
Total		196	(27)

International career
2009	Russia U20	7	(4)
2011	Russia-2	2	(1)
- * Club domestic league appearances and goals

Zaur Umarovich Sadayev (Russian: Заур Умарович Садаев; born 6 November 1989) is a Chechen Russian former professional footballer.

== Club career ==
=== Akhmat Grozny ===
He made his debut with FC Terek Grozny in the Russian Premier League in 2008.

==== 2013: Loan to Beitar Jerusalem ====
On 30 January 2013, he was transferred to the Israeli Beitar Jerusalem along with Dzhabrail Kadiyev, both Muslims. On 3 March, Sadayev scored his first goal for Beitar during a league game against Maccabi Netanya, prompting hundreds of the team's fans to leave the stadium. It was also his first and last goal for Beitar Jerusalem. In total, he made 7 appearances and scored 1 goal.

==== 2019: Loan to Ankaragücû ====
On 31 January 2019, he joined Turkish club Ankaragücü on loan until the end of the 2018–19 season. On 16 July 2019, he returned to Ankaragücü, signing a one-year contract. He left the club in March 2020.

=== Aluston-YUBK Alushta ===
In August 2021, Sadayev joined Russian club Aluston-YUBK Alushta.

== Career statistics ==
As of match played 28 December 2019.

Club	Season	League			Cup		Total	
Club	Season	Division	Apps	Goals	Apps	Goals	Apps	Goals
Terek Grozny/ Akhmat Grozny	2006	Russian First Division	3	0	0	0	3	0
Terek Grozny/ Akhmat Grozny	2007	Russian First Division	7	2	0	0	7	2
Terek Grozny/ Akhmat Grozny	2008	Russian Premier League	3	0	0	0	3	0
Terek Grozny/ Akhmat Grozny	2009	Russian Premier League	17	2	0	0	17	2
Terek Grozny/ Akhmat Grozny	2010	Russian Premier League	16	1	0	0	16	1
Terek Grozny/ Akhmat Grozny	2011–12	Russian Premier League	28	3	3	1	31	4
Terek Grozny/ Akhmat Grozny	2012–13	Russian Premier League	7	0	0	0	7	0
Terek Grozny/ Akhmat Grozny	2013–14	Russian Premier League	7	0	1	0	8	0
Terek Grozny/ Akhmat Grozny	2015–16	Russian Premier League	15	5	1	0	16	5
Terek Grozny/ Akhmat Grozny	2016–17	Russian Premier League	7	2	1	0	8	2
Terek Grozny/ Akhmat Grozny	2017–18	Russian Premier League	16	3	1	0	17	3
Terek Grozny/ Akhmat Grozny	2018–19	Russian Premier League	4	0	1	1	5	1
Terek Grozny/ Akhmat Grozny	Total		130	18	8	2	138	20
Beitar Jerusalem (loan)	2012–13	Israeli Premier League	7	1	0	0	7	1
Lechia Gdańsk (loan)	2013–14	Ekstraklasa	12	3	2	0	14	3
Lechia Gdańsk (loan)	2014–15	Ekstraklasa	4	0	0	0	4	0
Lechia Gdańsk (loan)	Total		16	3	2	0	18	3
Lech Poznań (loan)	2014–15	Ekstraklasa	25	5	5	4	30	9
Ankaragücü (loan)	2018–19	Süper Lig	7	0	0	0	7	0
Ankaragücü	2019–20	Süper Lig	5	0	1	0	6	0
Ankaragücü	Total		12	0	1	0	13	0
Career total			190	27	16	6	206	33

== Honours ==
Lech Poznań

- Ekstraklasa: 2014–15

Individual

- Polish Cup top scorer: 2014–15
