= Ivan Kurdanin =

Russian footballer

Personal information
- Full name: Ivan Yuryevich Kurdanin
- Date of birth: 24 March 1984 (age 42)
- Place of birth: Krasnogorsk, Moscow Oblast, Russian SFSR
- Height: 1.85 m (6 ft 1 in)
- Position: Defender

Youth career
- PFC CSKA Moscow

Senior career*
Years	Team	Apps	(Gls)
2002–2004	FC Titan Moscow	61	(4)
2005	FC Presnya Moscow	6	(0)
2005	FC Spartak Shchyolkovo	18	(0)
2006	FC Amkar Perm	0	(0)
2007	FC Spartak Kostroma	24	(0)
2008	FC Volga Ulyanovsk	3	(1)
2008	FC Gubkin	12	(1)
2009–2010	FC Mordovia Saransk	25	(3)
2010	FC Torpedo Moscow	3	(0)
2011	FC Podolye Podolsky district	13	(1)
2011–2013	FC Gubkin	38	(5)
- * Club domestic league appearances and goals

Ivan Yuryevich Kurdanin (Russian: Иван Юрьевич Курданин; born 24 March 1984) is a former Russian professional football player.

== Club career ==
He made his debut for the senior squad of FC Amkar Perm on 20 September 2006 in the Russian Cup game against FC Angusht Nazran.

He made his Russian Football National League debut for FC Volga Ulyanovsk on 14 June 2008 in a game against FC Rostov. He played 2 seasons in the FNL for Volga Ulyanovsk and FC Mordovia Saransk.
