= Islam Dzhabrailov =

Russian footballer

Personal information
- Full name: Nur-Islam Adymovich Dzhabrailov
- Date of birth: 16 August 1992 (age 34)
- Height: 1.88 m (6 ft 2 in)
- Position: Midfielder

Senior career*
Years	Team	Apps	(Gls)
2010–2011	FC Terek Grozny	0	(0)
- * Club domestic league appearances and goals

Nur-Islam Adymovich Dzhabrailov (Russian: Нур-Ислам Адымович Джабраилов; born 16 August 1992) is a former Russian footballer.

== Career ==
Dzhabrailov made his professional debut for FC Terek Grozny on 13 July 2010 in the Russian Cup game against FC Luch-Energiya Vladivostok.
