= Ivan Drannikov =

Russian footballer

Personal information
- Full name: Ivan Sergeyevich Drannikov
- Date of birth: 22 July 1986 (age 40)
- Place of birth: Rostov-on-Don, Russian SFSR
- Height: 1.85 m (6 ft 1 in)
- Position: Defender

Team information
- Current team: SKA-Khabarovsk (fitness coach)

Youth career
- 1995–2003: Rostov

Senior career*
Years	Team	Apps	(Gls)
2004–2006	Rostov	0	(0)
2005	→ Volga Tver (loan)	2	(0)
2007	Sodovik Sterlitamak	32	(0)
2008	Torpedo-BelAZ Zhodino	0	(0)
2008	SOYUZ-Gazprom Izhevsk	14	(0)
2009	SKA Rostov-on-Don	22	(0)
2010	Gornyak Uchaly	12	(0)
2010–2013	Ural Sverdlovsk Oblast	60	(1)
2013–2014	Neftekhimik Nizhnekamsk	29	(1)
2014–2017	Fakel Voronezh	42	(2)
2017–2018	Rotor Volgograd	12	(1)

Managerial career
- 2018–2019: Avangard Kursk (fitness coach)
- 2019–2021: Chayka Peschanokopskoye (fitness coach)
- 2021–2023: Shinnik Yaroslavl (fitness coach)
- 2023: Fakel Voronezh (fitness coach)
- 2023–2024: Kuban Krasnodar (fitness coach)
- 2024–2025: SKA-Khabarovsk (fitness coach)
- 2025: Akhmat Grozny (fitness coach)
- 2025–: SKA-Khabarovsk (fitness coach)
- * Club domestic league appearances and goals

Ivan Sergeyevich Drannikov (Russian: Иван Серге́евич Дранников; born 22 July 1986) is a Russian professional football coach and a former player who is the fitness coach with SKA-Khabarovsk.

== Club career ==
He played 8 seasons in the Russian Football National League for 5 different clubs.
