= Khasan Dzhunidov =

Russian footballer

Personal information
- Full name: Khasan Sharpudiyevich Dzhunidov
- Date of birth: 15 March 1991 (age 35)
- Height: 1.78 m (5 ft 10 in)
- Position: Defender

Senior career*
Years	Team	Apps	(Gls)
2009–2010	FC Terek Grozny	0	(0)
2011	→ FC Rotor Volgograd (loan)	2	(0)
2012–2013	FC Mashuk-KMV Pyatigorsk	0	(0)
2013–2014	FC Terek-2 Grozny	11	(0)
- * Club domestic league appearances and goals

Khasan Sharpudiyevich Dzhunidov (Russian: Хасан Шарпудиевич Джунидов; born 15 March 1991) is a former Russian footballer.

== Career ==
Dzhunidov made his professional debut for FC Terek Grozny on 13 July 2010 in the Russian Cup game against FC Luch-Energiya Vladivostok.
