= Anzor Tembulatov =

Russian footballer

Personal information
- Full name: Anzor Sharaniyevich Tembulatov
- Date of birth: 8 June 1989 (age 37)
- Height: 1.79 m (5 ft 10 in)
- Position: Midfielder

Senior career*
Years	Team	Apps	(Gls)
2005–2007	FC Terek-2 Grozny (amateur)		
2008–2011	FC Terek Grozny	1	(0)
- * Club domestic league appearances and goals

Anzor Sharaniyevich Tembulatov (Russian: Анзор Шараниевич Тембулатов; born 8 June 1989) is a former Russian footballer.

== Club career ==
He made his Russian Premier League debut for FC Terek Grozny on 21 November 2009 in a game against FC Kuban Krasnodar.
