= Andrei Kobenko =

Russian footballer

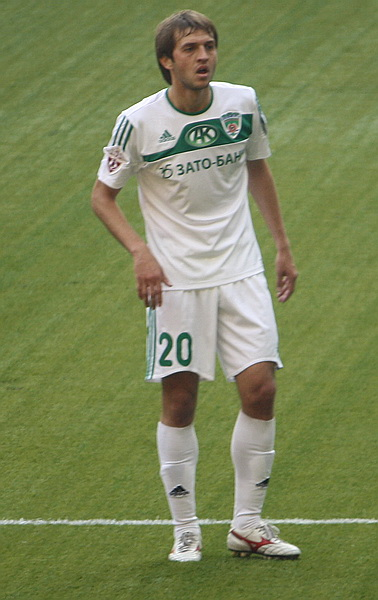

Personal information
- Full name: Andrei Vasilyevich Kobenko
- Date of birth: 25 June 1982 (age 44)
- Place of birth: Maykop, Soviet Union
- Height: 1.76 m (5 ft 9 1/2 in)
- Position: Wide midfielder

Youth career
- –1998: SDYuShOR Maykop

Senior career*
Years	Team	Apps	(Gls)
1999–2000	FC Rostselmash-2 Rostov-on-Don	53	(4)
2001–2002	FC Slavyansk Slavyansk-na-Kubani	73	(24)
2003–2007	FC Amkar Perm	122	(8)
2008	FC Rubin Kazan	17	(2)
2009–2011	FC Terek Grozny	50	(3)
2012	FC Chernomorets Novorossiysk	8	(0)
2012–2013	FC Salyut Belgorod	20	(0)
2014	FC Torpedo Armavir	10	(0)
2014	FC SKChF Sevastopol	14	(3)
- * Club domestic league appearances and goals

Andrei Vasilyevich Kobenko (Russian: Андрей Васильевич Кобенко; born 25 June 1982) is a former Russian footballer.

== Club career ==
He made his Russian Premier League debut for FC Amkar Perm on 1 May 2004 in a game against FC Shinnik Yaroslavl.

In early 2009, FC Terek Grozny have signed the attacking midfielder from rivals and Russian reigning champions FC Rubin Kazan.

== Personal life ==
He is a younger brother of Aleksandr Kobenko.
