= Islam Tsuroyev =

Russian footballer

Personal information
- Full name: Islam Zyaudinovich Tsuroyev
- Date of birth: 23 April 1989 (age 37)
- Height: 1.82 m (5 ft 11 1/2 in)
- Position: Striker

Senior career*
| Years | Team | Apps | (Gls) |
| 2005 | FC Angusht-2 Nazran | | |
| 2006 | FC Magas-IGU Nazran | | |
| 2006 | FC Angusht Nazran | 19 | (0) |
| 2007–2010 | FC Terek Grozny | 10 | (0) |
| 2011–2016 | FC Angusht Nazran | 93 | (5) |
- * Club domestic league appearances and goals

Islam Zyaudinovich Tsuroyev (Russian: Ислам Зяудинович Цуроев; born 23 April 1989) is a former Russian professional footballer.

== Club career ==
He made his professional debut in the Russian First Division in 2006 for FC Angusht Nazran.
