= Fabrício (footballer, born 1981) =

Brazilian footballer

Personal information
- Full name: Fabrício Silva Cabral
- Date of birth: 16 September 1981 (age 45)
- Place of birth: Rio de Janeiro, Brazil
- Height: 1.66 m (5 ft 5 1/2 in)
- Positions: Midfielder; forward

Senior career*
Years	Team	Apps	(Gls)
2001	Cachoeiro		
2003	Americano		
2005	Seongnam Ilhwa Chunma	3	(1)
2006	Portuguesa	?	(1)
2007	Barueri	9	(1)
2008	Corinthians Alagoano		
2009	Mesquita	11	(1)
2009	Terek Grozny	0	(0)
2010	Maccabi Netanya	12	(1)
2012	Santo André	9	(0)
2013	Rio Branco		
2014	Barueri	3	(0)
- * Club domestic league appearances and goals as of 18:00, 20 January 2012 (UTC)

Fabrício Silva Cabral (born 16 September 1981), best known simply as Fabrício, is a Brazilian footballer.

== Career ==
During his career, Fabrício was contracted to a number of modest Brazilian sides including Cachoeiro Futebol Clube, Americano Futebol Clube, Associação Portuguesa de Desportos, Grêmio Recreativo Barueri and Mesquita Futebol Clube. He also played three games as a forward for a South Korean K-League team Seongnam Ilhwa Chunma in 2005.

Being a free agent, he signed for Russian Premier League side Terek on 31 August 2009 until the end of the season, and was falsely introduced to the press as a well-known former Botafogo player. A one hundred sixty six-centimeter footballer, he weighed 71 kilos at that moment. His contract was terminated on 9 October 2009. In the January 2010 transfer window Fabricio arrived in Israel to try out for local club Hapoel Tel Aviv F.C. Having failed to impress, he left to go on trial at Maccabi Netanya F.C. which signed him on January 18, 2010.
