= Jean Bouli =

Cameroonian footballer

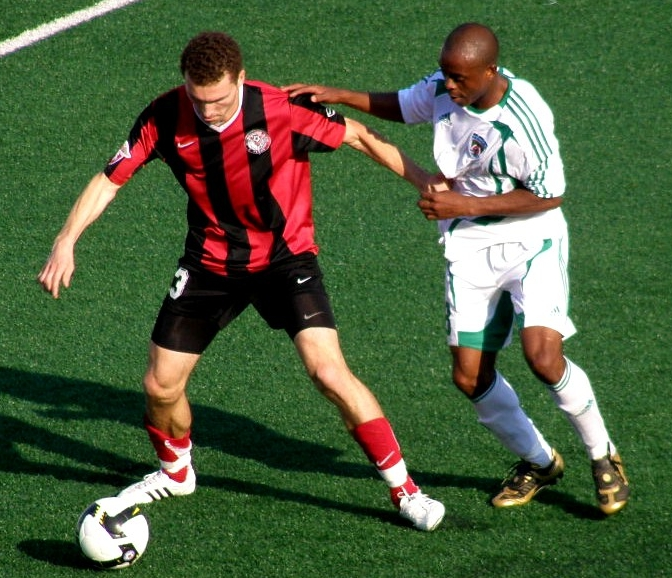
- Bouli (right)

Personal information
- Full name: Jean Blaise Bouli
- Date of birth: 4 September 1980 (age 46)
- Place of birth: Douala, Cameroon
- Height: 1.75 m (5 ft 9 in)
- Position: Midfielder

Youth career
- ?–1998: Union Douala

Senior career*
Years	Team	Apps	(Gls)
1998–2000	Union Douala		
2000–2002	Getafe CF	10	(0)
2003	Canon Yaoundé		
2004	Tonnerre Yaoundé		
2004–2007	FC Dynamo Bryansk	101	(22)
2007–2009	FC Terek Grozny	26	(2)
2009	→ FC Nizhny Novgorod (loan)	11	(1)
2010	Luch-Energia Vladivostok	17	(1)
2011	FC Jūrmala	9	(0)
2011–2012	FC Olimpia	20	(4)
- * Club domestic league appearances and goals

Jean Blaise Bouli (born 4 September 1980) is a retired Cameroonian footballer.

Previously he played for FC Jūrmala in Latvia. He played 9 games, scoring no goals.
