= German Kutarba =

Russian Footballer

Personal information
- Full name: German Vasilyevich Kutarba
- Date of birth: 10 September 1978 (age 48)
- Place of birth: Gagra, Georgian SSR, Soviet Union
- Height: 1.75 m (5 ft 9 in)
- Positions: Midfielder; defender

Senior career*
Years	Team	Apps	(Gls)
1995–1996	FC Zhemchuzhina Sochi	6	(0)
1997	FC Kuban Krasnodar	31	(3)
1998	FC Zhemchuzhina Sochi	18	(4)
1999–2000	FC Alania Vladikavkaz	27	(6)
2001	FC Dynamo Moscow	6	(0)
2001	FC Alania Vladikavkaz	8	(1)
2002	FC Terek Grozny	36	(11)
2003	FC Avtodor Vladikavkaz	0	(0)
2003–2004	FC Arsenal Kyiv	21	(5)
2005	FC Dynamo Moscow	2	(0)
2005–2006	FC Metalurh Zaporizhya	14	(5)
2007	FC Mashuk-KMV Pyatigorsk	11	(3)
2007–2008	SC Tavriya Simferopol	5	(0)
2008	FC Sochi-04	2	(0)
2008	FC SKA Rostov-on-Don	2	(0)
2009	FC Terek Grozny	2	(1)
2010	FC Gagra		

International career
1999	Russia U21	3	(0)
- * Club domestic league appearances and goals

German Vasilyevich Kutarba (Russian: Герман Васильевич Кутарба; born 10 September 1978) is a Russian former professional footballer.

== Club career ==
He made his professional debut in the Soviet Second League in 1991 for FC Dinamo Gagra.

== International ==
At one point he was a candidate for the Russia's UEFA Euro 2004 roster, but was never actually called up.

== Personal life ==
He was born in Abkhazia, a pro-Russia autonomous republic inside Georgian SSR. After the independent of Georgia, Dinamo Gagra refused to play in Georgian league and he then left for FC Zhemchuzhina Sochi, just about 50 km away in Krasnodar Krai, Russia.
