= Andriy Dykan =

Ukrainian footballer

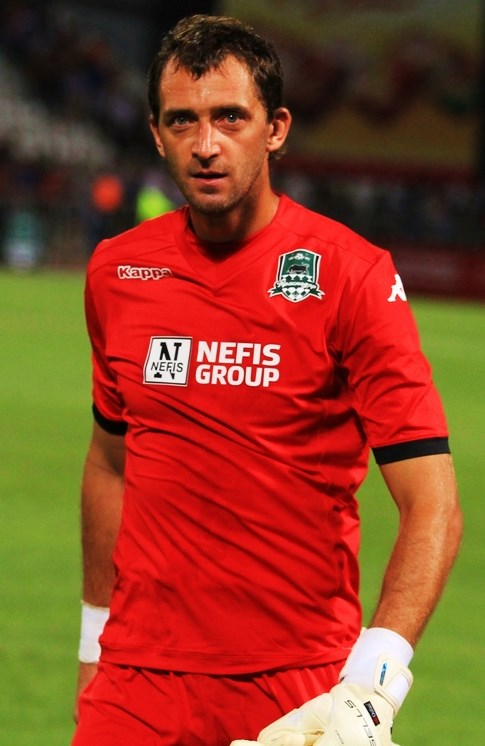
- With FC Krasnodar in 2014

Personal information
- Full name: Andriy Oleksandrovich Dykan
- Date of birth: 16 July 1977 (age 49)
- Place of birth: Kharkiv, Ukrainian SSR, Soviet Union
- Height: 1.92 m (6 ft 4 in)
- Position: Goalkeeper

Youth career
- sport-school in Kharkiv

Senior career*
Years	Team	Apps	(Gls)
1995–1998	Avanhard Rovenky	21	(2)
1999	Shakhtar Makiivka		
1999–2004	SKA-Energiya Khabarovsk	132	(9)
2004–2008	Kuban Krasnodar	95	(0)
2008	Tavriya Simferopol	23	(0)
2009–2010	Terek Grozny	47	(0)
2010–2014	Spartak Moscow	69	(0)
2014–2016	Krasnodar	39	(0)
Total		426	(11)

International career
2010–2012	Ukraine	8	(0)

Managerial career
- 2020–2023: Metalist Kharkiv (goalkeeping coach)
- 2023–2024: LNZ Cherkasy (goalkeeping coach)
- 2024: LNZ Cherkasy (caretaker)
- 2025–: Metalist 1925 Kharkiv (women) (assistant)
- 2025–: Ukraine (women) (assistant)
- * Club domestic league appearances and goals

Andriy Oleksandrovych Dykan (Ukrainian: Андрій Олександрович Дикань; born 16 July 1977) is a Ukrainian football manager and retired goalkeeper who last played for Russian side FC Krasnodar His previous clubs include Terek Grozny and Spartak Moscow. Dykan was also a full Ukrainian international, winning 8 caps for his country.

== Club career ==
Born in Kharkiv, Andriy Dykan began his career in the Ukrainian lower league clubs.

He moved to Russian First Division side SKA-Energiya Khabarovsk in 1999, where he became the first-choice goalkeeper and even regularly took penalties, scoring 9 goals in his 5 years with the club. Young and gifted goalkeeper was noticed by a number of top flight Russian clubs, but deal offers from Lokomotiv Moscow and Rubin Kazan were rejected fo various reasons.

In 2004, Dykan signed for FC Kuban Krasnodar, where he also became a regular starter, but following an illness, lost his first-team place to Vladimir Gabulov.

Dykan moved back to Ukraine and joined FC Tavriya Simferopol in 2008.

In 2009, he left Tavriya on a free transfer and moved to FC Terek Grozny. His outstanding performances in the first half of 2010 season earned him an offer from Russian giants FC Spartak Moscow.

In 2010, Dykan signed a contract with the Moscow club. In his only second competitive game for Spartak, an UEFA Champions League away match against Olympique de Marseille on 15 September 2010, Dykan became the hero of the hour, keeping the clean sheet and making many crucial saves, as Spartak went on to win the game 1–0. He maintained steady performances in 2010–11 UEFA Europa League, keeping two clean sheets against AFC Ajax in the round of sixteen and thus helping Spartak to defeat Dutch team 4-0 on aggregate. Dykan's form in Russian Premier League was solid, finally ending Spartak's goalkeeping troubles that emerged after the departure of Stipe Pletikosa. Dykan's ability to make spectacular saves, as well as virtual absence of blunders, have earned him much respect from the fans.

After recovering from injury, Dykan was forced to settle for a place on the bench due to the outstanding performances of Sergei Pesyakov and Artyom Rebrov, previously Spartak's second and third-choice keepers, respectively. However, he then returned to being Spartak's first choice 'keeper, putting in an impressive performance against city rivals CSKA.

Dykan played the final years of his career at FC Krasnodar.

== International career ==
Dykan made his debut for the Ukraine national football team in a friendly match against Norway on 2 June 2010, at the age of 32. He continued making regular appearances for the national team, and as Ukraine's home European Championship approached, Dykan, despite his belated debut, appeared to be the most probable choice for Ukraine's starting goalkeeper at the tournament. Alongside his promising performances for the national team, his position was also strengthened by the injury of veteran Oleksandr Shovkovskyi and the 2-year ban of young prospect Oleksandr Rybka. However, on 31 March 2012, while playing for Spartak against Zenit, he suffered a collision with Zenit's Aleksandr Kerzhakov and was injured. Dykan was diagnosed with multiple facial bones fractures, craniocerebral trauma and brain concussion. He went on to miss the final tournament, and did not make an appearance for Ukraine again.

== Personal life ==
Dykan became a dual citizen in 2000 after receiving Russian citizenship while living in Khabarovsk.

== Honours ==
Individual:

- Russian First Division best goalkeeper: 2005.

with Spartak Moscow:

- Russian Premier League: Runner-up, 2012
- Copa del Sol: Winner, 2012 (exhibition tournament)
