= Levan Gvazava =

Georgian footballer (born 1980)

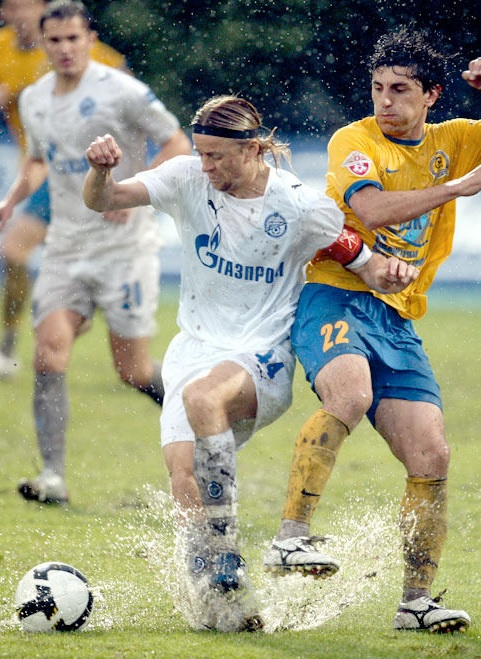
- Gvazava (right) with Anatoliy Tymoshchuk

Personal information
- Date of birth: 8 July 1980 (age 46)
- Place of birth: Nojikhevi, Khobi District, Georgian SSR
- Height: 1.77 m (5 ft 10 in)
- Position: Midfielder

Team information
- Current team: Pobeda Khasavyurt (manager)

Senior career*
| Years | Team | Apps | (Gls) |
| 1996–1999 | Kolkheti Khobi | 82 | (8) |
| 2000–2003 | Zimbru Chişinău | 87 | (11) |
| 2004–2005 | Alania Vladikavkaz | 23 | (1) |
| 2005–2006 | Dinamo Batumi | 7 | (0) |
| 2006–2007 | Spartak Nalchik | 22 | (1) |
| 2007–2008 | Luch-Energiya | 36 | (4) |
| 2009–2012 | Terek Grozny | 60 | (2) |
| 2012–2013 | Khimki | 10 | (1) |
| 2014 | Neftchi Farg'ona | 7 | (0) |
| 2014 | Anzhi Makhachkala | 0 | (0) |
| 2017 | Ararat-2 Moscow | | |

International career
| 1999–2001 | Georgia U21 | 8 | (0) |

Managerial career
- 2019–2020: Legion Dynamo Makhachkala (assistant)
- 2021: Kolomna
- 2021–2022: Kolomna (assistant)
- 2022: Saturn Ramenskoye (assistant)
- 2022–2023: Veles Moscow (assistant)
- 2023–2025: Legion Makhachkala (assistant)
- 2025: Legion Makhachkala
- 2026–: Pobeda Khasavyurt
- * Club domestic league appearances and goals

Levani Gvazava (Georgian: ლევან გვაზავა; Russian: Левани Тенгизович Гвазава; born 8 July 1980) is a Georgian football manager and a former player. He is the manager of Russian club Pobeda Khasavyurt.

== Career ==
On 1 September 2014, Gvazava signed a one-year contract with Anzhi Makhachkala.

In 2010, he was called up for the national team of his country for the first time.
