= Murad Tagilov =

Russian footballer

Personal information
- Full name: Murad Shamanovich Tagilov
- Date of birth: 27 January 1990 (age 36)
- Height: 1.89 m (6 ft 2 in)
- Position: Defender

Senior career*
Years	Team	Apps	(Gls)
2008–2015	FC Terek Grozny	5	(0)
2013–2014	→ FC Terek-2 Grozny	17	(0)
2014–2015	→ FC Khimik Dzerzhinsk (loan)	19	(2)
2016	FC Terek-2 Grozny	0	(0)
2017	FC Druzhba Maykop	7	(2)

International career
2009	Russia U-19	3	(0)
- * Club domestic league appearances and goals

Murad Shamanovich Tagilov (Russian: Мурад Шаманович Тагилов; born 27 January 1990) is a Russian former footballer.

== Club career ==
He made his Russian Premier League debut for FC Terek Grozny on 21 November 2009 in a game against FC Kuban Krasnodar.
