= Ze'ev Haimovich =

Israeli footballer (born 1983)

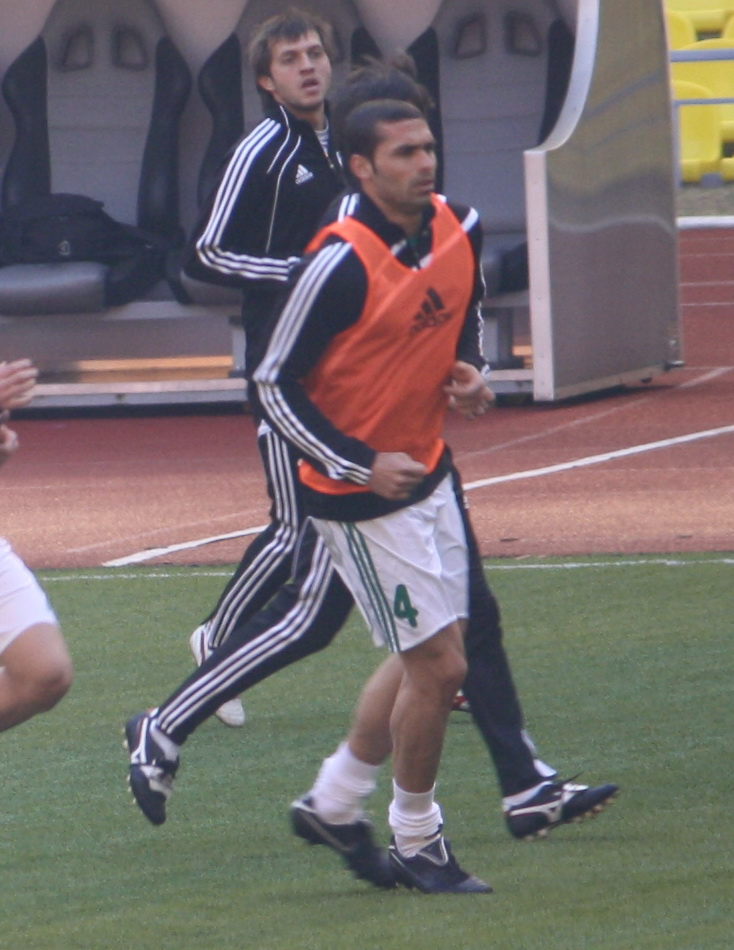
- Haimovich warming up for Terek Grozny in 2010

Personal information
- Date of birth: 7 April 1983 (age 43)
- Place of birth: Netanya, Israel
- Height: 1.88 m (6 ft 2 in)
- Position: Defender

Youth career
- Beitar Nes Tubruk

Senior career*
Years	Team	Apps	(Gls)
2001–2004	Hapoel Ra'anana	74	(2)
2004–2007	Hapoel Petah Tikva	86	(1)
2007–2008	Bnei Yehuda	33	(0)
2008–2009	Maccabi Netanya	16	(1)
2009–2012	Terek Grozny	26	(0)
2012–2014	Hapoel Tel Aviv	9	(0)
2013	→ Hapoel Ramat Gan (loan)	12	(0)
2014–2015	Beitar Jerusalem	24	(0)
2015–2016	Maccabi Netanya	7	(0)

International career
1998–2000	Israel U16	19	(1)
2001	Israel U19	1	(0)
2004–2005	Israel U21	12	(0)
2007	Israel	1	(0)
- * Club domestic league appearances and goals

Ze'ev Haimovich (Hebrew: זאב חיימוביץ; born 7 April 1983) is an Israeli former footballer.

== Biography ==
Haimovich was born in Netanya to a mother from Odesa and father from Transcarpathia. He grew up speaking Russian at home.

=== Transfer to Russia ===
On 1 August 2009, the vice-president of Terek Grozny Khaidar Alhanov, announced the arrival from Maccabi Netanya of Haimovich. He signed a three-year deal worth $1.3m and became the second Israeli player to ever compete in the Russian League, after Idan Shum.

=== Return to Israel ===
On 18 July 2012, Haimovich returned to play in Israel by signing at Hapoel Tel Aviv for two years.

== Honours ==
=== Hapoel Petah Tikva ===
- Toto Cup (1):
  - 2004–05

=== Hapoel Ramat Gan F.C. ===
- State Cup(1):
  - 2013
