= Cléber (footballer, born 1974) =

Brazilian footballer

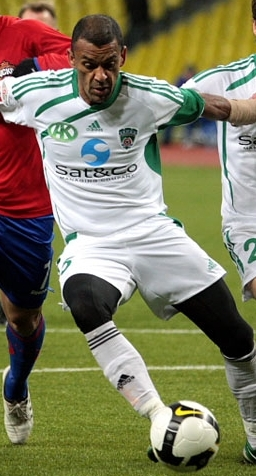

Personal information
- Full name: Cléber Guedes de Lima
- Date of birth: 29 April 1974 (age 52)
- Place of birth: Brasília, Brazil
- Height: 1.83 m (6 ft 0 in)
- Position: Centre-back

Senior career*
Years	Team	Apps	(Gls)
1993–1994	Portuguesa	2	(0)
1994–1995	Internacional-SP		
1995–1997	XV de Piracicaba		
1996–1997	→ Cruzeiro (loan)		
1998	Guarani	6	(0)
1999–2001	União Barbarense		
1999	→ Gama (loan)	6	(0)
2000–2001	→ Belenenses (loan)	28	(0)
2001–2006	Vitoria Guimarães	137	(9)
2006–2009	Wisła Kraków	65	(10)
2009	Terek Grozny	18	(1)
2010	Wisła Kraków	8	(0)
2014	Capital CF		
2015	Garbarz Zembrzyce		
- * Club domestic league appearances and goals

Cléber Guedes de Lima or simply Cléber (born 29 April 1974) is a Brazilian former professional footballer who played as a centre-back.

== Honours ==
XV de Piracicaba

- Série C: 1995

Cruzeiro

- Copa Libertadores: 1997

Wisła Kraków

- Ekstraklasa: 2007–08, 2008–09, 2010–11

Individual

- Ekstraklasa Best Foreigner: 2006
