= Timur Dzhabrailov =

Chechen Russian footballer

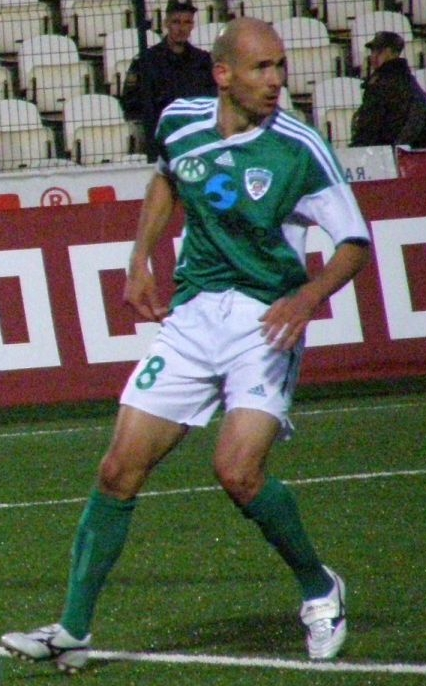

Personal information
- Full name: Timur Mamedovich Dzhabrailov
- Date of birth: August 5, 1973 (age 53)
- Height: 1.83 m (6 ft 0 in)
- Position: Defender

Team information
- Current team: FC Terek Grozny (director of sports)

Youth career
- FC Terek Grozny

Senior career*
Years	Team	Apps	(Gls)
1990	FC Terek Grozny	10	(0)
1991	FC Vaynakh Shali	32	(2)
1994	FC Terek Grozny	19	(4)
1999–2000	FC Angusht Nazran	55	(5)
2001–2010	FC Terek Grozny	233	(27)

Managerial career
- 2011–: FC Terek Grozny (director of sports)
- * Club domestic league appearances and goals as of 17:17, 22 March 2010 (UTC)

Timur Mamedovich Dzhabrailov (Russian: Тимур Мамедович Джабраилов; born 5 August 1973) is a retired Russian footballer of Chechen ethnicity who played for FC Terek Grozny and was its captain in 2001–2010. After retirement, he was appointed club's director of sports.
