= Aleksei Nikolaev (referee) =

Russian football referee

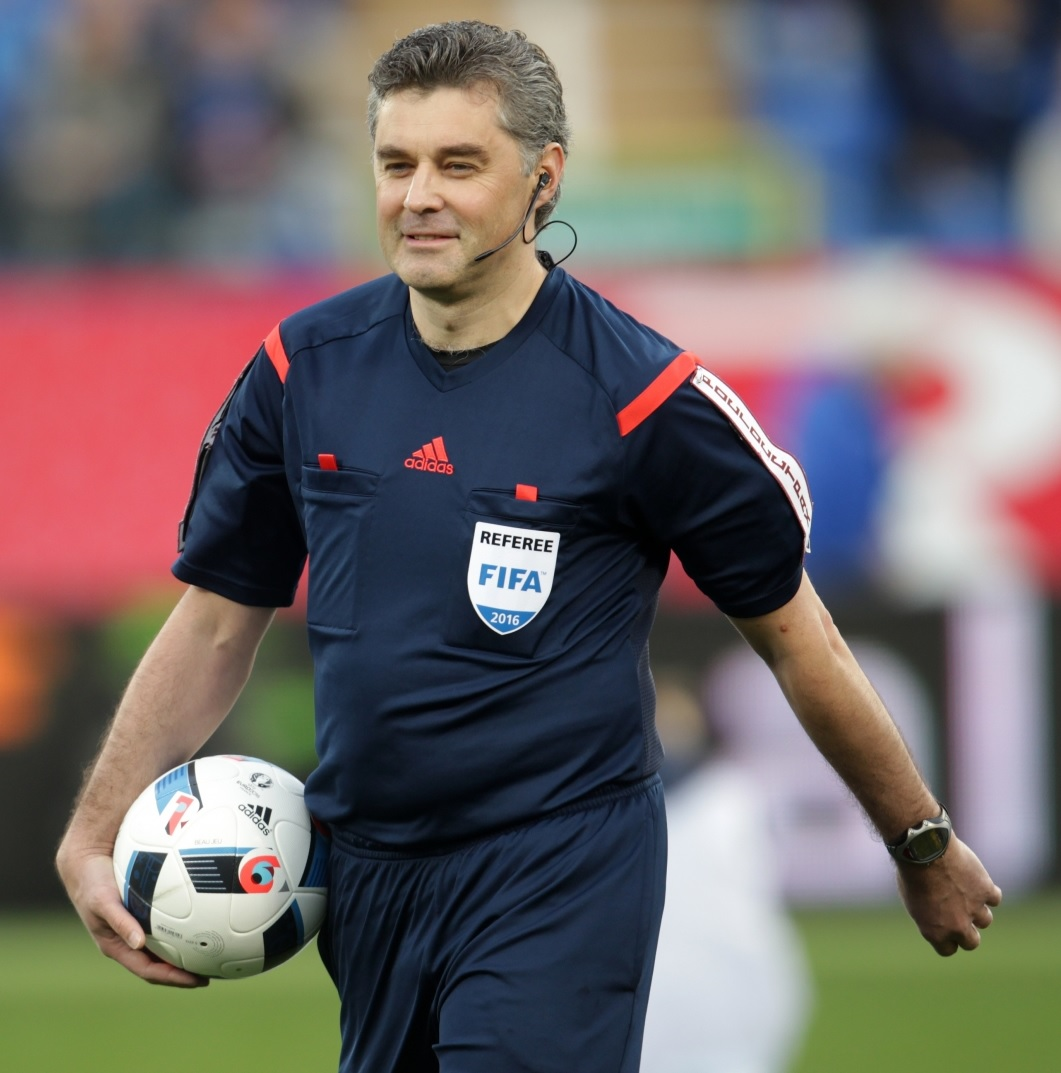
- Aleksei Nikolayev in 2016
- Born: Aleksei Valeryevich Nikolaev Russian: Алексей Валерьевич Николаев; August 1, 1971 (age 53); Moscow, USSR
- Citizenship: Russia
- Occupation: Referee

Aleksei Valeryevich Nikolaev (Russian: Алексей Валерьевич Николаев; born 1 August 1971 in Moscow) is a former Russian football referee. He has been a FIFA international referee from 2007 to 2017. In 2011, he was selected for the FIFA U-17 World Cup in Mexico. Nikolaev has also officiated in 2010 World Cup qualifiers.

He works in the Russian Football Union refereeing committee since retiring as a referee.
