= FC Terek-2 Grozny =

- Full name: Football Club Terek-2 Grozny
- Founded: 2013
- Dissolved: 2016
- Chairman: Vacant
- 2015–16: PFL, Zone South, 9th

FC Terek-2 Grozny (Russian: ФК «Терек-2» Грозный) was a Russian football team from Grozny, founded in 2013. Since 2013 it played in the Russian Professional Football League (third level). It was a farm club for the Russian Premier League team FC Terek Grozny. It was dissolved in the summer of 2016.
