= 2011–12 FC Terek Grozny season =

Terek Grozny
2011–12 season
- Chairman: Ramzan Kadyrov
- Manager: Ruud Gullit; 18 January - 14 June 2011; Isa Baytiyev (caretaker); 15 June - 27 September 2011; Stanislav Cherchesov; 27 September 2011 -
- Stadium: Akhmad Arena
- Russian Premier League: 11th
- Russian Cup: Quarterfinals vs Volga Nizhny Novgorod
- Top goalscorer: League: Maurício (9); All: Maurício; Shamil Asildarov (9)
- Highest home attendance: 30,000 vs Anzhi Makhachkala; 19 May 2011
- Lowest home attendance: 8,900 vs Tom Tomsk; 3 March 2012
- Average home league attendance: 14,176
Home colours	Away colours

The 2011–12 FC Terek Grozny season was the fourth successive season that the club played in the Russian Premier League, the highest tier of football in Russia. They finished the season in 11th place, and reached the Quarter-Finals of the Russian Cup where they were eliminated by Volga Nizhny Novgorod after extra time.

Following the completion of the 2010 season, Anatoli Baidachny's contract as manager expired and he was replaced by Víctor Muñoz. However, after less than a month Muñoz left via mutual consent and was replaced by Ruud Gullit. Following only three wins in eleven games, Gullit was sacked on 14 June 2011, and replaced by Isa Baytiyev in a caretaker roll. On 27 September 2011 Baytiyev's caretaker spell came to an end and Stanislav Cherchesov was appointed as the club's manager.

== Squad ==
As of match played 13 May 2012

No.	Name	Nationality	Position	Date of birth (age)	Signed from	Signed in	Contract ends	Apps.	Goals
Goalkeepers
1	Soslan Dzhanayev	(Russia)	GK	13 March 1987 (aged 25)	loan from Spartak Moscow	2010		42	0
12	Yaroslav Hodzyur	(Ukraine)	GK	6 March 1985 (aged 27)	Dynamo-2 Kyiv	2008		22	0
19	Ștefan Sicaci	(Moldova)	GK	8 September 1988 (aged 23)	Sheriff Tiraspol	2008		1	0
Defenders
3	Dmitri Yatchenko	(Russia)	DF	25 August 1986 (aged 25)	Spartak Nalchik	2010		71	1
4	Ze'ev Haimovich	(Israel)	DF	7 April 1983 (aged 29)	Maccabi Netanya	2009		26	0
5	Antonio Ferreira	(Brazil)	DF	24 October 1984 (aged 27)	Spartak Nalchik	2010		64	1
14	Xavier	(Burkina Faso)	DF	22 January 1984 (aged 28)	Viktoria Žižkov	2010		31	1
24	Marcin Komorowski	(Poland)	DF	17 April 1984 (aged 28)	Legia Warsaw	2012		7	0
25	Piotr Polczak	(Poland)	DF	25 August 1986 (aged 25)	KS Cracovia	2011		13	1
40	Rizvan Utsiyev	(Russia)	DF	7 February 1988 (aged 24)	Trainee	2005			
52	Martin Jiránek	(Czech Republic)	DF	25 May 1979 (aged 32)	Birmingham City	2011		24	0
90	Murad Tagilov	(Russia)	DF	27 January 1990 (aged 22)	Trainee	2008		2	0
Midfielders
6	Adílson	(Brazil)	MF	16 January 1987 (aged 25)	Grêmio	2011		6	0
7	Blagoy Georgiev	(Bulgaria)	MF	21 December 1981 (aged 30)	Slavia Sofia	2009		90	6
8	Maurício	(Brazil)	MF	21 October 1988 (aged 23)	Fluminense	2010		68	13
9	Guy Essame	(Cameroon)	MF	25 November 1984 (aged 27)	Boavista	2008		65	0
10	Adlan Katsayev	(Russia)	MF	20 February 1988 (aged 24)	Trainee	2005			
15	Aleksandr Pavlenko	(Russia)	MF	20 January 1985 (aged 27)	Spartak Moscow	2011		37	6
19	Oleg Ivanov	(Russia)	MF	4 August 1986 (aged 25)	Rostov	2012		11	0
21	Oleg Vlasov	(Russia)	MF	10 December 1984 (aged 27)	Saturn Ramenskoye	2008		61	1
22	Levan Gvazava	(Georgia (country))	MF	8 July 1980 (aged 31)	Luch-Energiya Vladivostok	2009		63	2
31	Maciej Rybus	(Poland)	MF	19 August 1989 (aged 22)	Legia Warsaw	2012		12	3
99	Jonathan Legear	(Belgium)	MF	13 April 1987 (aged 25)	Anderlecht	2011		8	0
Forwards
11	Shamil Asildarov	(Russia)	FW	18 May 1983 (aged 28)	Spartak Nalchik	2010			
13	Zaur Sadayev	(Russia)	FW	6 November 1989 (aged 22)	Trainee	2006			
17	Musawengosi Mguni	(Zimbabwe)	FW	8 April 1983 (aged 29)	Metalurh Donetsk	2011		21	3
23	Khalid Kadyrov	(Russia)	FW	19 April 1994 (aged 18)	Trainee	2010		2	0
55	Igor Lebedenko	(Russia)	FW	27 May 1983 (aged 28)	Rubin Kazan	2012		13	2
77	Stanislav Murikhin	(Russia)	FW	21 January 1992 (aged 20)	Zenit St.Petersburg	2012		2	0
Out on Loan
33	Ismail Ediyev	(Russia)	DF	16 February 1988 (aged 24)	Trainee	2005			
Left During the Season
2	Syarhey Amelyanchuk	(Belarus)	DF	8 August 1980 (aged 31)	Rostov	2008		101	1
19	Héctor Bracamonte	(Argentina)	FW	16 February 1978 (aged 34)	FC Moscow	2009		38	4
20	Andrei Kobenko	(Russia)	MF	25 June 1982 (aged 29)	Rubin Kazan	2009		51	3
26	Ewerthon	(Brazil)	FW	10 June 1981 (aged 30)	Palmeiras	2011		7	1
28	Rodrigo Tiuí	(Brazil)	FW	4 December 1985 (aged 26)	Atlético Goianiense	2010		17	1

== Transfers ==
=== Winter 2010-11 ===
In: Note: Flags indicate national team as defined under FIFA eligibility rules; some limited exceptions apply. Players may hold more than one non-FIFA nationality.

No.	Pos.	Nation	Player
15	MF	RUS	Aleksandr Pavlenko (from (Russia) Spartak Moscow)
17	FW	ZIM	Musawengosi Mguni (from (Ukraine) Metalurh Donetsk)
24	MF	RUS	Dmitri Smirnov (end of loan to (Russia) Luch-Energiya Vladivostok)
25	DF	POL	Piotr Polczak (from (Poland) Cracovia)
39	MF	RUS	Umar Davletmurzayev
42	FW	RUS	Aslan Tokhosashvili
43	FW	RUS	Islam Davletukayev
44	DF	RUS	Dzhabrail Kadiyev
47	MF	RUS	Adam Baybatyrov
71	MF	RUS	Sayd-Magomed Suleymanov
88	GK	MDA	Stepan Sikach (end of loan to (Russia) Volgar-Gazprom Astrakhan)
91	GK	RUS	Magomed Dokuyev

Out: Note: Flags indicate national team as defined under FIFA eligibility rules; some limited exceptions apply. Players may hold more than one non-FIFA nationality.

No.	Pos.	Nation	Player
10	MF	RUS	Shamil Lakhiyalov (to (Russia) Krasnodar)
18	DF	RUS	Timur Dzhabrailov (retired)
23	FW	RUS	Islam Tsuroyev (released)
24	MF	RUS	Dmitri Smirnov (to (Russia) Mordovia Saransk)
34	MF	RUS	Islam Dadayev (released)
37	DF	RUS	Sharudi Bukhiyev (released)
39	MF	RUS	Ali Idrisov (released)
44	MF	RUS	Aslan Dashayev (to (Russia) Angusht Nazran)
45	MF	RUS	Ramzan Utsiyev (released)
55	MF	RUS	Ramzan Sadulayev (released)
71	MF	BOL	Juan Carlos Arce (to (Bolivia) Oriente Petrolero)
91	GK	RUS	Magomed Serazhdinov (released)
92	DF	RUS	Raybek Surkhayev (released)

=== Summer 2011 ===
In: Note: Flags indicate national team as defined under FIFA eligibility rules; some limited exceptions apply. Players may hold more than one non-FIFA nationality.

No.	Pos.	Nation	Player
26	FW	BRA	Ewerthon (from (Brazil) Palmeiras)
52	DF	CZE	Martin Jiránek (from (England) Birmingham City)
49	MF	RUS	Salakh Barzukayev
59	MF	RUS	Ruslan Kantayev
79	DF	RUS	Shamil Maltsagov
94	FW	RUS	Makhammad Selimsultanov
97	DF	RUS	Sheykh-Magomed Tagirov
99	MF	BEL	Jonathan Legear (from (Belgium) Anderlecht)

Out: Note: Flags indicate national team as defined under FIFA eligibility rules; some limited exceptions apply. Players may hold more than one non-FIFA nationality.

No.	Pos.	Nation	Player
19	FW	ARG	Héctor Bracamonte (to (Russia) Rostov)
28	FW	BRA	Rodrigo Tiuí (loan to (Brazil) Náutico)
33	DF	RUS	Ismail Ediyev (loan to (Russia) Fakel Voronezh)

=== Winter 2011–12 ===
In: Note: Flags indicate national team as defined under FIFA eligibility rules; some limited exceptions apply. Players may hold more than one non-FIFA nationality.

No.	Pos.	Nation	Player
6	MF	BRA	Adílson (from (Brazil) Grêmio)
19	MF	RUS	Oleg Ivanov (from (Russia) Rostov)
24	DF	POL	Marcin Komorowski (from (Poland) Legia Warsaw)
31	MF	POL	Maciej Rybus (from (Poland) Legia Warsaw)
55	FW	RUS	Igor Lebedenko (from (Russia) Rubin Kazan)
60	MF	RUS	Akhyad Garisultanov
63	MF	RUS	Alikhan Abukhazhiyev
64	MF	RUS	Zelim Taymyskhanov
66	DF	RUS	Ilyas Demelkhanov
67	FW	RUS	Magomed Yanursayev
77	FW	RUS	Stanislav Murikhin (from (Russia) Zenit St. Petersburg)

Out: Note: Flags indicate national team as defined under FIFA eligibility rules; some limited exceptions apply. Players may hold more than one non-FIFA nationality.

No.	Pos.	Nation	Player
2	DF	BLR	Syarhey Amelyanchuk (to (Russia) Tom Tomsk)
20	MF	RUS	Andrei Kobenko (to (Russia) Chernomorets Novorossiysk)
26	FW	BRA	Ewerthon (to (Qatar) Al Ahli)
28	FW	BRA	Rodrigo Tiuí (to (Brazil) Criciúma)
32	DF	RUS	Mansur Soltayev (released)
35	DF	RUS	Yusup Tepishev (released)
38	FW	RUS	Salambek Elgadzhiyev (released)
47	MF	RUS	Adam Baybatyrov (released)
61	MF	RUS	Movsur Adamov (released)
63	MF	RUS	Vadim Belozyorov (released)
71	MF	RUS	Sayd-Magomed Suleymanov (released)
77	MF	RUS	Anzor Tembulatov (released)
80	MF	RUS	Islam Dzhabrailov (released)
98	DF	RUS	Batyr Umarov (released)

=== Released ===
Date	Position	Nationality	Name	Joined	Date
1 July 2012	DF	(Burkina Faso)	Xavier		
1 July 2012	MF	(Cameroon)	Guy Essame	Neman Grodno	28 July 2013
1 July 2012	FW	(Zimbabwe)	Musawengosi Mguni	Metalurh Donetsk	1 August 2013

== Competitions ==
=== Russian Premier League ===
==== Matches ====
13 March 2011 1	Terek Grozny	0 – 1	Zenit St.Petersburg	Grozny
18:30 MSK (UTC+4)	Tiuí (yellow card) 90+2'	Report	Lazović 14' (yellow card) 76'; Huszti (yellow card) 82'; Zyryanov (yellow card) 84'	Stadium: Sultan Bilimkhanov Stadium; Attendance: 9,700; Referee: Aleksei Nikolaev

20 March 2011 2	Rubin Kazan	2 – 0	Terek Grozny	Kazan
17:30 MSK (UTC+4)	Karadeniz 33'; Noboa 57'; Nemov (yellow card) 90+2'	Report	Mguni (yellow card) 22'; Pavlenko (yellow card) 55'; Polczak (yellow card) 63'	Stadium: Tsentralnyi Stadion; Attendance: 11,000; Referee: Yuri Baskakov

4 April 2011 3	Terek Grozny	2 – 0	Tom Tomsk	Grozny
18:00 MSK (UTC+4)	Maurício 14' (pen.) (yellow card) 29'; Tiuí 21'; Katsayev (yellow card) 71'	Report	Kim (yellow card) 12'; Sosnovski (yellow card) 25' (yellow-red card) 55'; Skoblyakov (yellow card) 36'	Stadium: Sultan Bilimkhanov Stadium; Attendance: 9,000; Referee: Aleksei Eskov

10 April 2011 4	Spartak Moscow	0 – 0	Terek Grozny	Moscow
20:45 MSK (UTC+4)	Suchý (yellow card) 24'; Welliton (yellow card) 73'	Report	Tiuí (yellow card) 27'; Ferreira (yellow card) 81'	Stadium: Luzhniki Stadium; Attendance: 7,500; Referee: Mikhail Vilkov

16 April 2011 5	Terek Grozny	0 – 0	Dynamo Moscow	Grozny
18:30 MSK (UTC+4)	Tiuí (yellow card) 90'	Report	Ropotan (yellow card) 14'; Fernández (yellow card) 49'	Stadium: Sultan Bilimkhanov Stadium; Attendance: 9,200; Referee: Vyacheslav Popov

23 April 2011 6	Rostov	1 – 0	Terek Grozny	Rostov-on-Don
16:15 MSK (UTC+4)	Khagush (yellow card) 3'; Blatnjak 34' (pen.); Yankov (yellow card) 60'	Report	Amelyanchuk (yellow card) 15'; Dzhanayev (yellow card) 33'; Sadayev (yellow card) 76'	Stadium: Olimp-2; Attendance: 7,500; Referee: Aleksei Nikolaev

30 April 2011 7	Terek Grozny	1 – 0	Volga Nizhny Novgorod	Grozny
16:15 MSK (UTC+4)	Maurício (yellow card) 35'; Mguni 75'; Vlasov (yellow card) 81'	Report	Grigalava (yellow card) 13'; Gogua (yellow card) 43'	Stadium: Sultan Bilimkhanov Stadium; Attendance: 9,300; Referee: Sergei Karasev

7 May 2011 8	Kuban Krasnodar	2 – 1	Terek Grozny	Krasnodar
15:00 MSK (UTC+4)	Varga 19' (pen.); Tsorayev (yellow card) 74'; Davydov 90'	Report	Dzhanayev (yellow card) 18'; Kobenko (yellow card) 33'; Amelyanchuk (yellow card) 59' (yellow-red card) 72'; Xavier 90+2'	Stadium: Kuban Stadium; Attendance: 15,000; Referee: Vitali Meshkov

14 May 2011 9	Lokomotiv Moscow	4 – 0	Terek Grozny	Moscow
20:45 MSK (UTC+4)	Shishkin 28', 43'; Burlak (yellow card) 54'; Glushakov 67'; Gatagov 80'	Report	Utsiyev (yellow card) 43'; Asildarov (penalty missed) 55'	Stadium: Lokomotiv Stadium; Attendance: 12,217; Referee: Vladislav Bezborodov

20 May 2011 10	Terek Grozny	1 – 0	Anzhi Makhachkala	Grozny
18:30 MSK (UTC+4)	Georgiev 45'; Utsiyev (yellow card) 90'	Report	Holenda (yellow card) 20'; Gadzhibekov (yellow card) 31'; Jucilei (yellow card) 71'; Tagirbekov (yellow card) 88'	Stadium: Akhmat-Arena; Attendance: 30,000; Referee: Yuri Baskakov

27 May 2011 11	Spartak Nalchik	2 – 2	Terek Grozny	Nalchik
17:00 MSK (UTC+4)	Zahirović 33'; Ovsiyenko (yellow card) 39'; Kontsedalov 71'; Lebedev (yellow card) 87'	Report	Maurício 38'; Georgiev (yellow card) 40'; Kobenko 42'; Bracamonte (yellow card) 53'	Stadium: Spartak Stadium; Attendance: 2,300; Referee: Sergei Karasev

10 June 2011 12	Terek Grozny	2 – 4	CSKA Moscow	Grozny
18:45 MSK (UTC+4)	Kobenko (yellow card) 56'; Maurício 86', 88'	Report	Doumbia 19' (yellow card) 45+1'; Vágner Love 37', 80'; Honda 52'	Stadium: Akhmat-Arena; Attendance: 21,000; Referee: Stanislav Sukhina

14 June 2011 13	Amkar Perm	1 – 0	Terek Grozny	Perm
17:45 MSK (UTC+4)	Amelyanchuk 90' (o.g.)	Report	Maurício (yellow card) 33'; Tiuí (yellow card) 70'; Asildarov (yellow card) 82'; Utsiyev (yellow card) 87'	Stadium: Zvezda Stadium; Attendance: 7,400; Referee: Aleksei Eskov

18 June 2011 14	Terek Grozny	2 – 0	Krylia Sovetov	Grozny
18:45 MSK (UTC+4)	Pavlenko 28'; Asildarov 56' (pen.); Amelyanchuk (yellow card) 71'	Report	Yeliseyev (yellow card) 56'	Stadium: Akhmat-Arena; Attendance: 16,700; Referee: Yuri Baskakov

22 June 2011 15	Krasnodar	0 – 2	Terek Grozny	Krasnodar
21:00 MSK (UTC+4)	Movsisyan (yellow card) 28'; Anđelković (yellow card) 35'; Vranješ (yellow card) 82'; Joãozinho (yellow card) 90'	Report	Amelyanchuk (yellow card) 12' (goal) 18'; Asildarov 83'; Dzhanayev (yellow card) 89'; Utsiyev (yellow card) 90'	Stadium: Kuban Stadium; Attendance: 12,300; Referee: Sergey Lapochkin

26 June 2011 16	Zenit St.Petersburg	0 – 0	Terek Grozny	Saint Petersburg
18:45 MSK (UTC+4)	Bukharov (yellow card) 86'	Report	Gvazava (yellow card) 22'; Ferreira (yellow card) 86'; Dzhanaev (yellow card) 90'	Stadium: Petrovsky Stadium; Attendance: 18,500; Referee: Vladimir Kazmenko

22 July 2011 17	Terek Grozny	0 – 1	Rubin Kazan	Grozny
19:45 MSK (UTC+4)	Ferreira (yellow card) 14'; Bracamonte (yellow card) 37'; Utsiyev (yellow card) 88'; Maurício (yellow card) 88'	Report	Karadeniz (yellow card) 14'; Dyadyun (yellow card) 58'; Ansaldi (yellow card) 80'; Kasaev 85'	Stadium: Akhmat-Arena; Attendance: 16,355; Referee: Aleksei Eskov

29 July 2011 18	Tom Tomsk	0 – 1	Terek Grozny	Tomsk
15:30 MSK (UTC+4)	Jokić (yellow card) 49'	Report	Amelyanchuk (yellow card) 24'; Asildarov 51'; Gvazava (yellow card) 76'	Stadium: Trud Stadium; Attendance: 9,000; Referee: Almir Kayumov

7 August 2011 19	Terek Grozny	2 – 4	Spartak Moscow	Grozny
19:15 MSK (UTC+4)	Asildarov 20' (penalty missed) 35'; Maurício 35'; Gvazava (yellow card) 41'; Pavlenko (yellow card) 42'; Georgiev (yellow card) 44'; Dzhanayev (red card) 47'	Report	D.Kombarov (yellow card) 18'; Rojo (yellow card) 34'; Dzyuba (penalty missed) 43' 90+5'; K.Kombarov 51' (pen.); Ari 76'; Suchý (yellow card) 90+6'; Welliton 90+9'	Stadium: Akhmat-Arena; Attendance: 18,000; Referee: Vladislav Bezborodov

13 August 2011 20	Dynamo Moscow	6 – 2	Terek Grozny	Khimki
16:15 MSK (UTC+4)	Voronin 29'; Kurányi 35'; Semshov 45', 85'; Yusupov 49'; Karyaka (penalty missed) 76'; Sapeta 90'	Report	Ewerthon 6'; Haimovich (yellow card) 18'; Utsiyev (yellow card) 21'; Georgiev (yellow card) 43' (goal) 87'; Jiránek (yellow card) 76'	Stadium: Arena Khimki; Attendance: 6,441; Referee: Alexander Yegorov

20 August 2011 21	Terek Grozny	1 – 1	Rostov	Grozny
20:30 MSK (UTC+4)	Asildarov (yellow card) 7'; Ferreira (yellow card) 35'; Sadayev (yellow card) 80'; Cociș 90' (o.g.)	Report	Kalachev 18'; Bracamonte (yellow card) 37'; Pletikosa (yellow card) 45+3'; Ivanov (yellow card) 67'	Stadium: Akhmat-Arena; Attendance: 12,300; Referee: Maksim Layushkin

27 August 2011 22	Volga Nizhny Novgorod	3 – 1	Terek Grozny	Nizhny Novgorod
17:45 MSK (UTC+4)	Tursunov 18'; Arziani (yellow card) 22'; Yeshchenko (yellow card) 25'; Gogua 39'; Buyvolov (yellow card) 41'; Khojava 55' (pen.)	Report	Sadayev (yellow card) 22'; Katsayev (yellow card) 26'; Amelyanchuk (yellow card) 33'; Pavlenko 85'	Stadium: Lokomotiv Stadium; Attendance: 4,800; Referee: Aleksei Nikolaev

12 September 2011 23	Terek Grozny	1 – 2	Kuban Krasnodar	Grozny
18:30 MSK (UTC+4)	Yatchenko (yellow card) 22'; Ferreira (yellow card) 27'; Asildarov 32'; Pavlenko (yellow card) 68'; Georgiev (yellow card) 75'	Report	Tlisov (yellow card) 25'; Traoré 28' (pen.), 53'; Lolo (yellow card) 72'; Kozlov (yellow card) 81'	Stadium: Akhmat-Arena; Attendance: 14,000; Referee: Sergey Lapochkin

18 September 2011 24	Terek Grozny	0 – 4	Lokomotiv Moscow	Grozny
19:30 MSK (UTC+4)	Georgiev (yellow card) 42'; Legear (yellow card) 57'	Report	Glushakov 22' (pen.), 44' (pen.) (yellow card) 28'; Caicedo 47'; Maicon 88'	Stadium: Akhmat-Arena; Attendance: 12,500; Referee: Stanislav Sukhina

26 September 2011 25	Anzhi Makhachkala	2 – 2	Terek Grozny	Makhachkala, Dagestan
18:30 MSK (UTC+4)	Eto'o 14'; Agalarov (yellow card) 28'; João Carlos 90+2'	Report	Pavlenko 8'; Vlasov 88'	Stadium: Dynamo Stadium; Attendance: 14100; Referee: Aleksei Nikolaev

1 October 2011 26	Terek Grozny	0 – 1	Spartak Nalchik	Grozny
14:00 MSK (UTC+4)		Report	Mitrishev 18'; Portnyagin (yellow card) 85'	Stadium: Akhmat-Arena; Attendance: 13,300; Referee: Alexander Yegorov

14 October 2011 27	CSKA Moscow	2 – 2	Terek Grozny	Khimki
14:00 MSK (UTC+4)	Rahimić (yellow card) 29'; Love 39' (yellow card) 60'; Doumbia 47'; Šemberas (yellow card) 90+3'	Report	Pavlenko 67'; Maurício 68'; Amelyanchuk (yellow card) 76'	Stadium: Arena Khimki; Attendance: 3,200; Referee: Sergey Lapochkin

22 October 2011 28	Terek Grozny	1 – 0	Amkar Perm	Grozny
16:15 MSK (UTC+4)	Gvazava (yellow card) 41'; Asildarov (yellow card) 52'; Ferreira 70'	Report	Cherenchikov (yellow card) 25'; Blažić (yellow card) 25'; Smirnov (yellow card) 42'	Stadium: Akhmat-Arena; Attendance: 10,300; Referee: Eduard Malyi

30 October 2011 29	Krylia Sovetov	2 – 1	Terek Grozny	Samara
16:30 MSK (UTC+4)	Kornilenko (yellow card) 28'; Bobyor 32'; Vyeramko (yellow card) 33'; Yakovlev 53'; Taranov (yellow card) 70'; Joseph-Reinette (yellow card) 85'	Report	Legear (yellow card) 6'; Maurício 36' (yellow card) 73'; Amelyanchuk (yellow card) 59'; Asildarov (yellow card) 85'	Stadium: Metallurg Stadium; Attendance: 12,800; Referee: Maksim Layushkin

5 November 2011 30	Terek Grozny	2 – 0	Krasnodar	Grozny
18:30 MSK (UTC+4)	Xavier (yellow card) 41'; Mguni (yellow card) 45' (goal) 88'; Pavlenko 69'	Report	Kulchy (yellow card) 75'	Stadium: Akhmat-Arena; Attendance: 9,600; Referee: Timur Arslanbekov

==== Table ====
Pos	Team	Pld	W	D	L	GF	GA	GD	Pts	Qualification
9	Krasnodar	30	10	8	12	38	43	−5	38	Qualification to Relegation group
10	Rostov	30	8	8	14	31	45	−14	32	Qualification to Relegation group
11	Terek Grozny	30	8	7	15	29	45	−16	31	Qualification to Relegation group
12	Volga Nizhny Novgorod	30	8	4	18	24	40	−16	28	Qualification to Relegation group
13	Amkar Perm	30	6	9	15	20	39	−19	27 (Note: Amkar Perm ahead of Krylia Sovetov on head-to-head points; Amkar Perm–Krylia Sovetov 1–1, Krylia Sovetov–Amkar Perm 1–1.)	Qualification to Relegation group

Source: Russian Premier League
Rules for classification: 1) points; 2) number of wins; 3) head-to-head points; 4) number of head-to-head wins; 5) head-to-head goal difference; 6) number of head-to-head goals scored; 7) number of head-to-head away goals scored; 8) goal difference; 9) number of goals scored; 10) number of away goals scored.

=== Russian Premier League Relegation Group ===
==== Matches ====
19 November 2011 31	Terek Grozny	0 – 0	Krylia Sovetov	Grozny
16:15 MSK (UTC+4)	Georgiev (yellow card) 60'; Pavlenko (yellow card) 66'	Report	Đorđević (yellow card) 63'; Tsallagov (yellow card) 78'	Stadium: Akhmat-Arena; Attendance: 12,100; Referee: Vitali Meshkov

26 November 2011 32	Spartak Nalchik	3 – 0	Terek Grozny	Nalchik
14:00 MSK (UTC+4)	Golić 45'; Mitrishev 55', 83'; Fomin (yellow card) 81'	Report	Xavier (yellow card) 47'	Stadium: Spartak Stadium; Attendance: 3,127; Referee: Sergei Karasev

3 March 2012 33	Terek Grozny	1 – 0	Tom Tomsk	Grozny
14:00 MSK (UTC+4)	Jiránek (yellow card) 18'; Komorowski (yellow card) 24'; Asildarov 62'; Maurício (yellow card) 71'	Report	Mahmudov (yellow card) 72'	Stadium: Sultan Bilimkhanov Stadium; Attendance: 8,900; Referee: Aleksei Nikolaev

10 March 2012 34	Krasnodar	1 – 3	Terek Grozny	Krasnodar
15:00 MSK (UTC+4)	Joãozinho (yellow card) 35'; Drinčić (yellow card) 56'; Otar Martsvaladze\Otar Martsvaladze (penalty missed) 74'; Picușceac 87'	Report	Asildarov 7'; Rybus 21'; Lebedenko 21'; Dzhanayev (red card) 70'; Georgiev (yellow card) 81'	Stadium: Kuban Stadium; Attendance: 5,000; Referee: Almir Kayumov

17 March 2012 35	Terek Grozny	1 – 0	Rostov	Grozny
16:30 MSK (UTC+4)	Asildarov 48'	Report	Adamov (yellow card) 81'	Stadium: Akhmat-Arena; Attendance: 18,200; Referee: Vasiliy Kazartsev

26 March 2012 36	Terek Grozny	1 – 3	Volga Nizhny Novgorod	Grozny
19:00 MSK (UTC+4)	Maurício 22' (pen.) (yellow card) 60'; Asildarov (yellow card) 79'; Sadayev (yellow card) 87'	Report	Bibilov 52'; Karyaka 56'; Ajinjal 90'	Stadium: Terek Stadium; Attendance: 16,700; Referee: Igor Fedotov

1 April 2012 37	Amkar Perm	2 – 0	Terek Grozny	Perm
15:00 MSK (UTC+4)	Mijailović (yellow card) 49' (goal) 54'; Belorukov (yellow card) 56'; Jiránek 86' (o.g.)	Report	Pavlenko (yellow card) 90+4'	Stadium: Zvezda Stadium; Attendance: 7,400; Referee: Evgeny Turbin

6 April 2012 38	Terek Grozny	2 – 0	Spartak Nalchik	Grozny
16:15 MSK (UTC+4)	Jiránek (yellow card) 8'; Maurício 25'; Rybus (yellow card) 77'; Polczak 83'	Report	Bagayev (yellow card) 15'; Zahirović (red card) 71'; Kulikov (yellow card) 75'; Kontsedalov (yellow card) 80'; Džudović (yellow card) 83'	Stadium: Akhmat-Arena; Attendance: 16,800; Referee: Stanislav Sukhina

14 April 2012 39	Tom Tomsk	3 – 0	Terek Grozny	Tomsk
14:00 MSK (UTC+4)	Ivanov (yellow card) 28'; Ropotan (yellow card) 30'; Nakhushev 45+1'; Gultyayev 68'; Boyarintsev 84'	Report	Maurício (yellow card) 66'; Georgiev (yellow card) 67'; Rybus (yellow card) 73'; Asildarov (yellow card) 77'	Stadium: Trud Stadium; Attendance: 8,000; Referee: Vladislav Bezborodov

22 April 2012 40	Terek Grozny	0 – 1	Krasnodar	Grozny
14:00 MSK (UTC+4)	Polczak (yellow card) 74'	Report	Markov 28'; Drinčić (yellow card) 48'; Joãozinho (yellow card) 52'; Samsonov (yellow card) 66'	Stadium: Akhmat-Arena; Attendance: 10,200; Referee: Alexander Yegorov

27 April 2012 41	Rostov	1 – 1	Terek Grozny	Rostov-on-Don
19:30 MSK (UTC+4)	Adamov 3'; Smolnikov (yellow card) 18'; Pletikosa (yellow card) 26'; Poloz (yellow card) 41'; Okoronkwo (yellow card) 89'	Report	Sadayev (yellow card) 26'; Georgiev (yellow card) 36' (goal) 39'; Ivanov (yellow card) 38'; Ferreira (yellow card) 40'; Lebedenko (yellow card) 68'; Asildarov (yellow card) 78'	Stadium: Olimp–2; Attendance: 4,700; Referee: Igor Egorov

2 May 2012 42	Volga Nizhny Novgorod	1 – 3	Terek Grozny	Nizhny Novgorod
19:15 MSK (UTC+4)	Shulenin 11'; Karyaka (yellow card) 61'; Grigalava (yellow card) 77' Malyarov (yellow card) 87'	Report	Lebedenko 66'; Rybus 72'; Ivanov (yellow card) 74'; Sadayev 78' (pen.)	Stadium: Lokomotiv Stadium; Attendance: 5,100; Referee: Maksim Layushkin

6 May 2012 43	Terek Grozny	3 – 1	Amkar Perm	Grozny
18:30 MSK (UTC+4)	Sadayev 7', 85' (yellow card) 71'; Rybus 22'; Polczak (yellow card) 64'	Report	Blažić 9'; Belorukov (yellow card) 53'	Stadium: Akhmat-Arena; Attendance: 19,200; Referee: Sergey Lapochkin

13 May 2012 44	Krylia Sovetov	1 – 1	Terek Grozny	Samara
15:30 MSK (UTC+4)	Kornilenko 13'; Yakovlev (yellow card) 36'	Report	Georgiev 2' (yellow card) 54'; Ferreira (yellow card) 8'; Adílson (yellow card) 53'; Ivanov (yellow card) 56'; Lebedenko (yellow card) 75'	Stadium: Metallurg Stadium; Attendance: 19,500; Referee: Stanislav Sukhina

==== Table ====
Pos	Team	Pld	W	D	L	GF	GA	GD	Pts	Qualification or relegation
9	Krasnodar	44	16	13	15	58	61	−3	61	
10	Amkar Perm	44	14	13	17	40	51	−11	55	
11	Terek Grozny	44	14	10	20	45	62	−17	52	
12	Krylia Sovetov Samara	44	12	15	17	33	50	−17	51	
13	Rostov (O)	44	12	12	20	45	61	−16	48	Qualification to Relegation play-offs
14	Volga Nizhny Novgorod (O)	44	12	5	27	37	60	−23	41	Qualification to Relegation play-offs
15	Tom Tomsk (R)	44	8	13	23	30	70	−40	37	Relegation to Football National League
16	Spartak Nalchik (R)	44	7	13	24	39	60	−21	34	Relegation to Football National League

Source: Russian Premier League
Rules for classification: 1) points; 2) number of wins; 3) head-to-head points; 4) number of head-to-head wins; 5) head-to-head goal difference; 6) number of head-to-head goals scored; 7) number of head-to-head away goals scored; 8) goal difference; 9) number of goals scored; 10) number of away goals scored
(O) Play-off winners; (R) Relegated

=== Russian Cup ===
17 July 2011 Round of 32	Nizhny Novgorod	0 – 2	Terek Grozny	Grozny
19:30 MSK (UTC+4)		Report; Summary	Katsayev 60' (pen.); Sadayev 72'	Stadium: Terek Stadium; Attendance: 10,000; Referee: Vitali Meshkov

21 September 2011 Round of 16	Terek Grozny	2 – 0	Torpedo Vladimir	Grozny
16:30 MSK (UTC+4)	Pavlenko 49'; Mguni 57'	Report; Summary		Stadium: Terek Stadium; Attendance: 12,700; Referee: Vyacheslav Kharlamov

22 March 2012 Quarterfinals	Volga Nizhny Novgorod	2 – 1 (a.e.t.)	Terek Grozny	Nizhny Novgorod
14:00 MSK (UTC+4)	Kerzhakov (red card) 45'; Bendz 68'; Karyaka 98' (pen.)	Report; Summary	Asildarov 45+5'; Rybus (red card) 120'	Stadium: Lokomotiv Stadium; Attendance: 2,200; Referee: Timur Arslanbekov

== Squad statistics ==
As of match played 13 May 2012

=== Appearances and goals ===
No.	Pos	Nat	Player	Total		Premier League		Russian Cup	
No.	Pos	Nat	Player	Apps	Goals	Apps	Goals	Apps	Goals
1	GK	(Russia) RUS	Soslan Dzhanayev	39	0	37	0	2	0
3	DF	(Russia) RUS	Dmitri Yatchenko	41	1	38+1	1	2	0
4	DF	(Israel) ISR	Ze'ev Haimovich	6	0	3+3	0	0	0
5	DF	(Brazil) BRA	Antonio Ferreira	38	1	32+4	1	2	0
6	MF	(Brazil) BRA	Adílson	6	0	4+2	0	0	0
7	MF	(Bulgaria) BUL	Blagoy Georgiev	43	4	38+2	4	3	0
8	MF	(Brazil) BRA	Maurício	40	9	37	9	3	0
9	MF	(Cameroon) CMR	Guy Essame	17	0	6+11	0	0	0
10	MF	(Russia) RUS	Adlan Katsayev	28	1	16+10	0	0+2	1
11	FW	(Russia) RUS	Shamil Asildarov	38	9	29+7	8	2	1
12	GK	(Ukraine) UKR	Yaroslav Hodzyur	10	0	7+2	0	1	0
13	FW	(Russia) RUS	Zaur Sadayev	31	4	11+17	3	1+2	1
14	DF	(Burkina Faso) BFA	Xavier	26	1	21+4	1	1	0
15	MF	(Russia) RUS	Aleksandr Pavlenko	37	6	24+10	5	2+1	1
17	FW	(Zimbabwe) ZIM	Musawengosi Mguni	21	3	9+11	2	0+1	1
19	MF	(Russia) RUS	Oleg Ivanov	11	0	8+2	0	1	0
21	MF	(Russia) RUS	Oleg Vlasov	28	1	18+7	1	1+2	0
22	MF	(Georgia (country)) GEO	Levan Gvazava	24	0	16+6	0	1+1	0
23	FW	(Russia) RUS	Khalid Kadyrov	1	0	0+1	0	0	0
24	DF	(Poland) POL	Marcin Komorowski	7	0	6	0	1	0
25	DF	(Poland) POL	Piotr Polczak	13	1	12+1	1	0	0
31	MF	(Poland) POL	Maciej Rybus	12	3	10+1	3	1	0
40	DF	(Russia) RUS	Rizvan Utsiyev	19	0	17+1	0	1	0
52	MF	(Czech Republic) CZE	Martin Jiránek	24	0	22	0	2	0
55	FW	(Russia) RUS	Igor Lebedenko	13	2	12	2	1	0
77	FW	(Russia) RUS	Stanislav Murikhin	2	0	0+2	0	0	0
99	MF	(Belgium) BEL	Jonathan Legear	8	0	7+1	0	0	0
Players away from Terek Grozny on loan:
Players who appeared for Terek Grozny and left during the season:
2	DF	(Belarus) BLR	Syarhey Amelyanchuk	28	0	25+1	0	2	0
19	FW	(Argentina) ARG	Héctor Bracamonte	8	0	4+3	0	1	0
20	MF	(Russia) RUS	Andrei Kobenko	13	1	8+5	1	0	0
26	FW	(Brazil) BRA	Ewerthon	7	1	2+4	1	1	0
28	FW	(Brazil) BRA	Rodrigo Tiuí	9	1	5+3	1	1	0

=== Goal Scorers ===
Place	Position	Nation	Number	Name	Russian Premier League	Russian Cup	Total
1	MF	(Brazil)	8	Maurício	9	0	9
1	FW	(Russia)	11	Shamil Asildarov	8	1	9
3	MF	(Russia)	15	Aleksandr Pavlenko	5	1	6
4	MF	(Bulgaria)	7	Blagoy Georgiev	4	0	4
4	FW	(Russia)	13	Zaur Sadayev	3	1	4
6	MF	(Poland)	31	Maciej Rybus	3	0	3
6	FW	(Zimbabwe)	17	Musawengosi Mguni	2	1	3
8	FW	(Russia)	55	Igor Lebedenko	2	0	2
9	DF	(Poland)	25	Piotr Polczak	1	0	1
9	DF	(Brazil)	5	Antonio Ferreira	1	0	1
9	FW	(Brazil)	28	Rodrigo Tiuí	1	0	1
9	DF	(Burkina Faso)	14	Herve Xavier Zengue	1	0	1
9	MF	(Russia)	20	Andrei Kobenko	1	0	1
9	DF	(Belarus)	2	Syarhey Amelyanchuk	1	0	1
9	FW	(Brazil)	26	Ewerthon	1	0	1
9	MF	(Russia)	21	Oleg Vlasov	1	0	1
9	MF	(Russia)	10	Adlan Katsayev	0	1	0
9				Own goal	1	0	1
				TOTALS	45	5	50

=== Disciplinary record ===
Number	Nation	Position	Name	Russian Premier League		Russian Cup		Total	
Number	Nation	Position	Name	Yellow card	Red card	Yellow card	Red card	Yellow card	Red card
1	(Russia)	GK	Soslan Dzhanayev	4	2	0	0	4	2
3	(Russia)	DF	Dmitri Yatchenko	1	0	0	0	1	0
4	(Israel)	DF	Ze'ev Haimovich	1	0	0	0	1	0
5	(Brazil)	DF	Antonio Ferreira	6	0	2	0	8	0
6	(Brazil)	MF	Adílson	1	0	0	0	1	0
7	(Bulgaria)	MF	Blagoy Georgiev	9	0	1	0	10	0
8	(Brazil)	MF	Maurício	8	0	0	0	8	0
10	(Russia)	MF	Adlan Katsayev	2	0	1	0	3	0
11	(Russia)	FW	Shamil Asildarov	6	0	0	0	6	0
13	(Russia)	FW	Zaur Sadayev	5	0	1	0	6	0
14	(Burkina Faso)	DF	Herve Xavier Zengue	2	0	0	0	2	0
15	(Russia)	MF	Aleksandr Pavlenko	5	0	0	0	5	0
17	(Zimbabwe)	FW	Musawengosi Mguni	2	0	0	0	2	0
19	(Russia)	MF	Oleg Ivanov	3	0	0	0	3	0
21	(Russia)	MF	Oleg Vlasov	1	0	0	0	1	0
22	(Georgia (country))	MF	Levan Gvazava	4	0	0	0	4	0
24	(Poland)	DF	Marcin Komorowski	1	0	0	0	1	0
25	(Poland)	DF	Piotr Polczak	3	0	0	0	3	0
31	(Poland)	DF	Maciej Rybus	2	0	0	1	2	1
40	(Russia)	DF	Rizvan Utsiyev	5	0	0	0	5	0
52	(Czech Republic)	MF	Martin Jiránek	3	0	0	0	3	0
55	(Russia)	FW	Igor Lebedenko	1	0	1	0	2	0
99	(Belgium)	MF	Jonathan Legear	2	0	0	0	2	0
Players who left Terek Grozny during the season:
2	(Belarus)	DF	Syarhey Amelyanchuk	9	1	0	0	9	1
19	(Argentina)	FW	Héctor Bracamonte	2	0	0	0	2	0
20	(Russia)	MF	Andrei Kobenko	2	0	0	0	2	0
28	(Brazil)	FW	Rodrigo Tiuí	4	0	0	0	4	0
			TOTALS	94	3	6	1	100	4
