= 2012–13 FC Terek Grozny season =

Terek Grozny
2012–13 season
- Chairman: Ramzan Kadyrov
- Manager: Stanislav Cherchesov
- Stadium: Akhmad Arena
- Russian Premier League: 7th
- Russian Cup: Quarter-finals vs Rostov
- Top goalscorer: League: Igor Lebedenko & Aílton (6); All: Aílton (8)
- Highest home attendance: 28,102 vs Lokomotiv Moscow; 22 September 2012
- Lowest home attendance: 13,200 vs Mordovia Saransk; 10 November 2012
- Average home league attendance: 19,830
Home colours	Away colours

The 2012–13 FC Terek Grozny season was the fifth successive season that the club played in the Russian Premier League, the highest tier of football in Russia. They finished the season in 8th place, their highest finish ever in the RPL, and reached the Quarter-Finals of the Russian Cup where they were eliminated by Rostov.

== Squad ==
As of match played 26 May 2013

No.	Name	Nationality	Position	Date of birth (age)	Signed from	Signed in	Contract ends	Apps.	Goals
Goalkeepers
1	Igor Usminskiy	(Russia)	GK	23 April 1977 (aged 36)	Krasnodar	2013		0	0
12	Yaroslav Hodzyur	(Ukraine)	GK	6 March 1985 (aged 28)	Dynamo-2 Kyiv	2008		44	0
85	Anton Amelchenko	(Belarus)	GK	27 March 1985 (aged 28)	Lokomotiv Moscow	2012		11	0
Defenders
3	Dmitri Yatchenko	(Russia)	DF	25 August 1986 (aged 26)	Spartak Nalchik	2010		98	1
4	Juhani Ojala	(Finland)	DF	19 June 1989 (aged 23)	Young Boys	2013		3	0
5	Antonio Ferreira	(Brazil)	DF	24 October 1984 (aged 28)	Spartak Nalchik	2010		82	3
24	Marcin Komorowski	(Poland)	DF	17 April 1984 (aged 29)	Legia Warsaw	2012		37	3
40	Rizvan Utsiyev	(Russia)	DF	7 February 1988 (aged 25)	Trainee	2005			
52	Martin Jiránek	(Czech Republic)	DF	25 May 1979 (aged 34)	Birmingham City	2011		51	1
87	Fyodor Kudryashov	(Russia)	DF	5 April 1987 (aged 26)	Spartak Moscow	2012		17	0
90	Murad Tagilov	(Russia)	DF	27 January 1990 (aged 23)	Trainee	2008		3	0
Midfielders
6	Adílson	(Brazil)	MF	16 January 1987 (aged 26)	Grêmio	2011		33	1
7	Facundo Píriz	(Uruguay)	MF	27 March 1990 (aged 23)	Nacional	2013	2017	6	1
8	Maurício	(Brazil)	MF	21 October 1988 (aged 24)	Fluminense	2010		93	15
10	Adlan Katsayev	(Russia)	MF	20 February 1988 (aged 25)	Trainee	2005			
15	Aleksandr Pavlenko	(Russia)	MF	20 January 1985 (aged 28)	Spartak Moscow	2011		46	6
19	Oleg Ivanov	(Russia)	MF	4 August 1986 (aged 26)	Rostov	2012		39	3
20	Kanu	(Brazil)	MF	23 September 1987 (aged 25)	Anderlecht	2013		6	1
21	Oleg Vlasov	(Russia)	MF	10 December 1984 (aged 28)	Saturn Ramenskoye	2008		64	1
31	Maciej Rybus	(Poland)	MF	19 August 1989 (aged 23)	Legia Warsaw	2012		32	7
89	Maciej Makuszewski	(Poland)	MF	29 September 1989 (aged 23)	Jagiellonia Białystok	2012	2015	11	0
99	Jonathan Legear	(Belgium)	MF	13 April 1987 (aged 26)	Anderlecht	2011		16	1
Forwards
9	Aílton	(Brazil)	FW	20 August 1984 (aged 28)	APOEL	2012	2015	25	8
11	Magomed Mitrishev	(Russia)	FW	10 September 1992 (aged 20)	Spartak Nalchik	2012		20	2
13	Zaur Sadayev	(Russia)	FW	6 November 1989 (aged 23)	Trainee	2006			
55	Igor Lebedenko	(Russia)	FW	27 May 1983 (aged 29)	Rubin Kazan	2012		43	8
77	Stanislav Murikhin	(Russia)	FW	21 January 1992 (aged 21)	Zenit St.Petersburg	2012		4	0
80	Ezechiel N'Douassel	(Chad)	FW	22 April 1988 (aged 25)	Club Africain	2012		17	5
Out on Loan
25	Piotr Polczak	(Poland)	DF	25 August 1986 (aged 26)	KS Cracovia	2011		16	1
33	Ismail Ediyev	(Russia)	DF	16 February 1988 (aged 25)	Trainee	2005			
Left During the Season
1	Soslan Dzhanayev	(Russia)	GK	13 March 1987 (aged 26)	loan from Spartak Moscow	2010		43	0
7	Blagoy Georgiev	(Bulgaria)	MF	21 December 1981 (aged 31)	Slavia Sofia	2009		111	7
17	Musawengosi Mguni	(Zimbabwe)	FW	8 April 1983 (aged 30)	Metalurh Donetsk	2011		21	3

== Transfers ==
=== In ===
Date	Position	Nationality	Name	From	Fee	Ref.
9 August 2012	FW	(Chad)	Ezechiel N'Douassel	Club Africain	Undisclosed	
5 September 2012	FW	(Brazil)	Aílton	APOEL	Undisclosed	
6 September 2012	MF	(Poland)	Maciej Makuszewski	Jagiellonia Białystok	Undisclosed	
	FW	(Russia)	Magomed Mitrishev	Young Boys	Undisclosed	
	DF	(Russia)	Fyodor Kudryashov	Spartak Moscow	Undisclosed	
January 2013	MF	(Uruguay)	Facundo Píriz	Nacional	Undisclosed	
20 February 2013	MF	(Brazil)	Kanu	Anderlecht	Undisclosed	
26 February 2013	GK	(Russia)	Igor Usminskiy	Krasnodar	Undisclosed	

=== Out ===
Date	Position	Nationality	Name	To	Fee	Ref.
6 July 2012	GK	(Moldova)	Ștefan Sicaci	Salyut Belgorod	Undisclosed	
18 July 2012	DF	(Israel)	Ze'ev Haimovich	Hapoel Tel Aviv	Undisclosed	
31 August 2012	MF	(Georgia (country))	Levani Gvazava	Khimki	Undisclosed	
	FW	(Russia)	Shamil Asildarov	Volga Nizhny Novgorod	Undisclosed	
27 December 2012	MF	(Bulgaria)	Blagoy Georgiev	Amkar Perm	Undisclosed	

=== Loans in ===
Date from	Position	Nationality	Name	From	Date to	Ref.
Summer 2010	GK	(Russia)	Soslan Dzhanayev	Spartak Moscow	Summer 2012	
Summer 2010	GK	(Belarus)	Anton Amelchenko	Lokomotiv Moscow	Summer 2012	

=== Loans out ===
Date from	Position	Nationality	Name	To	Date to	Ref.
23 July 2012	DF	(Poland)	Piotr Polczak	Volga Nizhny Novgorod	End of Season	
	DF	(Russia)	Ismail Ediyev	Chernomorets Novorossiysk	End of Season	

=== Released ===
Date	Position	Nationality	Name	Joined	Date
	GK	(Russia)	Igor Usminskiy		
	FW	(Russia)	Stanislav Murikhin	Sillamäe Kalev	

== Competitions ==
=== Russian Premier League ===
==== Results by round ====
Round	1	2	3	4	5	6	7	8	9	10	11	12	13	14	15	16	17	18	19	20	21	22	23	24	25	26	27	28	29	30
Ground	A	H	A	H	A	H	A	A	H	A	H	A	H	A	H	A	H	A	H	A	H	H	A	H	A	H	A	H	A	H
Result	D	W	L	W	W	W	W	W	L	L	W	W	L	L	W	L	W	D	L	L	D	L	D	D	W	W	L	W	D	W
Position	9	5	7	5	4	2	2	1	4	4	3	3	4	6	5	5	4	4	5	8	8	9	9	9	8	8	8	8	8	8

Updated to match(es) played on 21 May 2013. Source: Russian Premier League
A = Away; H = Home; W = Win; D = Draw; L = Loss

==== Matches ====
22 July 2012 1	Krylia Sovetov	1 – 1	Terek Grozny	Samara
17:30 MSK (UTC+4)	Caballero 82' (pen.)	Summary	Ivanov 56'	Stadium: Metallurg Stadion; Attendance: 9,500; Referee: Sergey Karasev

30 July 2012 2	Terek Grozny	1 – 0	Krasnodar	Grozny, Chechnya
19:00 MSK (UTC+4)	Ivanov 18'	Summary		Stadium: Sultan Bilimkhanov Stadium; Attendance: 14,200; Referee: Maxim Layushkin

4 August 2012 3	Alania	5 – 0	Terek Grozny	Vladikavkaz
17:30 MSK (UTC+4)	Neco 7' (pen.), 26'; Priskin 19'; Khozin 34'; Khubulov 90+2'	Summary	Amelchenko (red card) 2'; Ivanov (red card) 67'	Stadium: Republican Spartak Stadium; Attendance: 12,000; Referee: Sergey Lapochkin

11 August 2012 4	Terek Grozny	2 – 0	Volga Nizhny Novgorod	Grozny, Chechnya
19:30 MSK (UTC+4)	Lebedenko 15', 90+3'	Summary		Stadium: Sultan Bilimkhanov Stadium; Attendance: 14,300; Referee: Eduard Malyi

18 August 2012 5	Dynamo Moscow	1 – 2	Terek Grozny	Moscow
16:00 MSK (UTC+4)	Dzsudzsák 75'; Rykov (red card) 82'; Kurányi (yellow card) 59' (yellow-red card) 90+2'	Summary	Rybus 30', 83'; Ndouassel (yellow card) 27' (red card) 53'	Stadium: Arena Khimki; Attendance: 5,836; Referee: Aleksey Eskov

25 August 2012 6	Terek Grozny	2 – 1	Spartak Moscow	Grozny, Chechnya
18:30 MSK (UTC+4)	Lebedenko 80'; Ferreira 90+1'	Summary	Insaurralde 65'	Stadium: Sultan Bilimkhanov Stadium; Attendance: 21,700; Referee: Vladislav Bezborodov

1 September 2012 7	Rubin	1 – 2	Terek Grozny	Kazan
14:00 MSK (UTC+4)	Rondón 68'; Bocchetti (yellow card) 84' (yellow-red card) 89'	Summary	Ndouassel 13'; Mitrishev 85'	Stadium: Tsentralnyi Stadion; Attendance: 9,277; Referee: Maxim Layushkin

14 September 2012 8	Zenit	0 – 2	Terek Grozny	Saint Petersburg
20:00 MSK (UTC+4)		Summary	Aílton 86'; Lebedenko 90+3'	Stadium: Petrovsky Stadium; Attendance: 20,500; Referee: Eduard Malyi

22 September 2012 9	Terek Grozny	0 – 3	Lokomotiv Moscow	Grozny, Chechnya
20:15 MSK (UTC+4)		Summary	Grigoryev 62'; Obinna 83'; Maicon 87'	Stadium: Sultan Bilimkhanov Stadium; Attendance: 28,102; Referee: Aleksandr Egorov

29 September 2012 10	Kuban Krasnodar	2 – 1	Terek Grozny	Krasnodar
19:00 MSK (UTC+4)	Ionov 32'; Özbiliz 83'	Summary	Jiránek 36'	Stadium: Kuban Stadium; Attendance: 16,700; Referee: Timur Arslanbekov

5 October 2012 11	Terek Grozny	2 – 1	Rostov	Grozny, Chechnya
19:00 MSK (UTC+4)	Komorowski 52'; Aílton 83'	Summary	Kalachev 85'	Stadium: Sultan Bilimkhanov Stadium; Attendance: 24,700; Referee: Alexey Nikolaev

21 October 2012 12	Amkar Perm	0 – 1	Terek Grozny	Perm
13:00 MSK (UTC+4)		Summary	Lebedenko 66'	Stadium: Zvezda Stadium; Attendance: 6,600; Referee: Sergey Ivanov

28 October 2012 13	Terek Grozny	1 – 2	CSKA Moscow	Grozny, Chechnya
16:00 MSK (UTC+4)	José Almeida 8'	Summary	Honda 25'; Wernbloom 88'	Stadium: Sultan Bilimkhanov Stadium; Attendance: 20,800; Referee: Vladislav Bezborodov

4 November 2012 14	Anzhi	3 – 1	Terek Grozny	Makhachkala, Dagestan
15:45 MSK (UTC+4)	Boussoufa 9'; Traore 17'; Samba 64'	Summary	Georgiev 54' (pen.)	Stadium: Dynamo Stadium; Attendance: 14,500; Referee: Aleksandr Egorov

10 November 2012 15	Terek Grozny	2 – 1	Mordovia	Grozny, Chechnya
16:00 MSK (UTC+4)	Legear 12'; Aílton 66'	Summary	Mukhametshin 90+1'	Stadium: Sultan Bilimkhanov Stadium; Attendance: 13,200; Referee: Timur Arslanbekov

19 November 2012 16	Krasnodar	3 – 0	Terek Grozny	Krasnodar
19:45 MSK (UTC+4)	Joãozinho 14' (pen.); Wánderson 18'; Shipitsin 52'	Summary		Stadium: Kuban Stadium; Attendance: 4,500; Referee: Aleksey Eskov

24 November 2012 17	Terek Grozny	1 – 0	Alania	Grozny, Chechnya
14:00 MSK (UTC+4)	Lebedenko 64'	Summary		Stadium: Sultan Bilimkhanov Stadium; Attendance: 20,700; Referee: Alexey Nikolaev

1 December 2012 18	Volga	1 – 1	Terek Grozny	Nizhny Novgorod
18:30 MSK (UTC+4)	Asildarov 53'	Summary	Ivanov 8'	Stadium: Lokomotiv Stadium; Attendance: 3,200; Referee: Maxim Layushkin

9 December 2012 19	Terek Grozny	1 – 2	Dynamo Moscow	Grozny, Chechnya
13:30 MSK (UTC+4)	Aílton 65'	Summary	Kurányi 12', 67'	Stadium: Sultan Bilimkhanov Stadium; Attendance: 22,500; Referee: Igor Nizovtsev

9 March 2013 20	Spartak Moscow	3 – 1	Terek Grozny	Moscow
13:30 MSK (UTC+4)	Movsisyan 2', 29', 76'	Summary	Maurício 78'	Stadium: Luzhniki Stadium; Attendance: 17,685; Referee: Aleksandr Egorov

17 March 2013 21	Terek Grozny	0 – 0	Rubin	Grozny, Chechnya
18:00 MSK (UTC+4)	Utsiyev (yellow card) 58' (yellow-red card) 87'	Summary		Stadium: Sultan Bilimkhanov Stadium; Attendance: 24,000; Referee: Mikhail Vilkov

31 March 2013 22	Terek Grozny	0 – 3	Zenit	Makhachkala, Dagestan
18:00 MSK (UTC+4)	Kudryashov (red card) 45+2'	Summary	Witsel 8'; Alves 58'; Zyryanov 90+2'	Stadium: Dynamo Stadium; Attendance: 24,128; Referee: Sergey Karasev

6 April 2013 23	Lokomotiv Moscow	1 – 1	Terek Grozny	Moscow
19:00 MSK (UTC+4)	Ďurica 4'	Summary	Maurício 7'	Stadium: Lokomotiv Stadium; Attendance: 9,176; Referee: Alexey Nikolaev

13 April 2013 24	Terek Grozny	2 – 2	Kuban Krasnodar	Grozny, Chechnya
16:00 MSK (UTC+4)	Utsiyev 59'; N'Douassel 71' (pen.)	Summary	Bucur 68'; Dealbert (yellow card) 54' (yellow-red card) 70'; Popov 88'	Stadium: Sultan Bilimkhanov Stadium; Attendance: 18,250; Referee: Timur Arslanbekov

22 April 2013 25	Rostov	0 – 3	Terek Grozny	Rostov-on-Don, Rostov Oblast
19:00 MSK (UTC+4)		Summary	Aílton 10'; Holenda 14' (o.g.); Adílson 49'	Stadium: Olimp – 2 Attendance: 3,500; Referee: Aleksandr Egorov

27 April 2013 26	Terek Grozny	2 – 1	Amkar Perm	Grozny, Chechnya
16:00 MSK (UTC+4)	Rybus 32', 65'	Summary	Burmistrov 85'	Stadium: Sultan Bilimkhanov Stadium; Attendance: 17,000; Referee: Igor Nizovtsev

4 May 2013 27	CSKA Moscow	1 – 0	Terek Grozny	Moscow
13:30 MSK (UTC+4)	Wernbloom 31'	Summary		Stadium: Luzhniki Stadium; Attendance: 8,150; Referee: Aleksey Eskov

12 May 2013 28	Terek Grozny	1 – 0	Anzhi	Grozny, Chechnya
16:00 MSK (UTC+4)	Píriz 27'	Summary		Stadium: Sultan Bilimkhanov Stadium; Attendance: 22,800; Referee: Vitali Meshkov

18 May 2013 29	Mordovia	1 – 1	Terek Grozny	Saransk
17:00 MSK (UTC+4)	R.Mukhametshin 57'	Summary	Mitrishev 73'	Stadium: Start Stadium; Attendance: 5,500; Referee: Vladimir Kazmenko

26 May 2013 30	Terek Grozny	4 – 1	Krylia Sovetov	Grozny, Chechnya
13:30 MSK (UTC+4)	N'Douassel 41', 66'; Antonio Ferreira 70'; Kanu 77'	Summary	Caballero 49'	Stadium: Sultan Bilimkhanov Stadium; Attendance: 13,700; Referee: Aleksey Eskov

==== League table ====
Pos	Team	Pld	W	D	L	GF	GA	GD	Pts	Qualification or relegation
6	Rubin Kazan	30	15	5	10	39	27	+12	50	Qualification for the Europa League second qualifying round
7	Dynamo Moscow	30	14	6	10	41	34	+7	48 (Note: Dynamo Moscow ahead of Terek Grozny on head-to-head points; Dynamo Moscow–Terek Grozny 1–2, Terek Grozny–Dynamo Moscow 1–2.)	
8	Terek Grozny	30	14	6	10	38	40	−2	48	
9	Lokomotiv Moscow	30	12	7	11	39	36	+3	43	
10	Krasnodar	30	12	6	12	45	39	+6	42	

Source: Russian Premier League
Rules for classification: 1) points; 2) number of wins; 3) head-to-head points; 4) number of head-to-head wins; 5) head-to-head goal difference; 6) number of head-to-head goals scored; 7) number of head-to-head away goals scored; 8) goal difference; 9) number of goals scored; 10) number of away goals scored; 11) position in the 2011–12 season (only used until all the regularly scheduled games have been played); 11) extra play-off game or tournament between the teams in question.

=== Russian Cup ===
==== Matches ====
25 September 2012 Round of 32	Spartak Nalchik	1–3	Terek Grozny	Nalchik
18:00 MSK (UTC+4)	Siradze 49'	Summary	Komorowski 5'; Ndouassel 20'; Utsiyev 42'	Stadium: Spartak Stadium; Attendance: 3,000; Referee: Igor Fedotov

31 October 2012 Round of 16	Terek Grozny	3–1 (a.e.t.)	Lokomotiv Moscow	Grozny
17:00 MSK (UTC+4)	Aílton 26' (pen.), 108'; Utsiyev 104'	Summary	Caicedo 82'; Samedov (red card) 90'	Stadium: Akhmad Arena; Attendance: 17,200; Referee: Igor Nizovtsev

18 April 2013 Quarter-Finals	FC Rostov	0–0 (a.e.t.) (4–3 p)	Terek Grozny	Rostov
18:00 MSK (UTC+4)		Summary	Utsiyev (yellow card) 39' (yellow-red card) 117'	Stadium: Olimp - 2 Attendance: 9,200; Referee: Alexei Eskov
	Penalties
	Kirichenko (penalty scored); Poloz (penalty scored); Sheshukov (penalty scored); Dyakov (penalty scored)		Aílton (penalty scored); Rybus (penalty scored); Lebedenko (penalty missed); Komorowski (penalty scored); Ivanov (penalty missed)

== Squad statistics ==
As of match played 26 May 2013

=== Appearances and goals ===
No.	Pos	Nat	Player	Total		Premier League		Russian Cup	
No.	Pos	Nat	Player	Apps	Goals	Apps	Goals	Apps	Goals
3	DF	(Russia) RUS	Dmitri Yatchenko	27	0	20+5	0	1+1	0
4	DF	(Finland) FIN	Juhani Ojala	3	0	3+0	0	0+0	0
5	DF	(Brazil) BRA	Antonio Ferreira	18	2	17+0	2	0+1	0
6	MF	(Brazil) BRA	Adílson	27	1	24+0	1	3+0	0
7	MF	(Uruguay) URU	Facundo Píriz	6	1	6+0	1	0+0	0
8	MF	(Brazil) BRA	Maurício	25	2	19+4	2	1+1	0
9	FW	(Brazil) BRA	Aílton	25	8	16+6	6	1+2	2
10	MF	(Russia) RUS	Adlan Katsayev	2	0	0+2	0	0+0	0
11	FW	(Russia) RUS	Magomed Mitrishev	20	2	3+15	2	0+2	0
12	GK	(Ukraine) UKR	Yaroslav Hodzyur	22	0	21+0	0	1+0	0
13	FW	(Russia) RUS	Zaur Sadayev	7	0	1+6	0	0+0	0
15	MF	(Russia) RUS	Aleksandr Pavlenko	9	0	2+5	0	1+1	0
19	MF	(Russia) RUS	Oleg Ivanov	28	3	26+0	3	1+1	0
20	FW	(Brazil) BRA	Kanu	6	1	3+3	1	0+0	0
21	MF	(Russia) RUS	Oleg Vlasov	3	0	0+2	0	1+0	0
23	FW	(Russia) RUS	Khalid Kadyrov	0	0	0+0	0	0+0	0
24	DF	(Poland) POL	Marcin Komorowski	30	2	21+6	1	3+0	1
31	MF	(Poland) POL	Maciej Rybus	20	4	15+4	4	1+0	0
40	DF	(Russia) RUS	Rizvan Utsiyev	28	3	24+1	1	3+0	2
52	DF	(Czech Republic) CZE	Martin Jiránek	27	1	22+3	1	2+0	0
55	MF	(Russia) RUS	Igor Lebedenko	30	6	26+1	6	3+0	0
77	FW	(Russia) RUS	Stanislav Murikhin	2	0	0+2	0	0+0	0
80	FW	(Chad) CHA	Ezechiel Ndouassel	17	5	10+5	4	2+0	1
85	GK	(Belarus) BLR	Anton Amelchenko	11	0	9+0	0	2+0	0
87	DF	(Russia) RUS	Fedor Kudryashov	17	0	14+1	0	2+0	0
89	MF	(Poland) POL	Maciej Makuszewski	11	0	2+7	0	2+0	0
90	DF	(Russia) RUS	Murad Tagilov	1	0	1+0	0	0+0	0
99	MF	(Belgium) BEL	Jonathan Legear	8	1	6+2	1	0+0	0
Players away from Terek Grozny on loan:
25	DF	(Poland) POL	Piotr Polczak	3	0	0+2	0	1+0	0
Players who appeared for Terek Grozny no longer at the club:
1	GK	(Russia) RUS	Soslan Dzhanayev	1	0	0+1	0	0+0	0
7	MF	(Bulgaria) BUL	Blagoy Georgiev	21	1	19+0	1	2+0	0
17	FW	(Zimbabwe) ZIM	Musawengosi Mguni	0	0	0+0	0	0+0	0

=== Goal scorers ===
Place	Position	Nation	Number	Name	Premier League	Russian Cup	Total
1	FW	(Brazil)	9	Aílton	6	2	8
2	MF	(Russia)	55	Igor Lebedenko	6	0	6
3	FW	(Chad)	80	Ezechiel Ndouassel	4	1	5
4	MF	(Poland)	31	Maciej Rybus	4	0	4
5	MF	(Russia)	19	Oleg Ivanov	3	0	3
6	MF	(Brazil)	8	Maurício	2	0	2
6	FW	(Russia)	11	Magomed Mitrishev	2	0	2
6	DF	(Brazil)	5	Antonio Ferreira	2	0	2
6	DF	(Poland)	24	Marcin Komorowski	1	1	2
6	DF	(Russia)	40	Rizvan Utsiyev	0	2	2
11	DF	(Czech Republic)	52	Martin Jiránek	1	0	1
11	MF	(Bulgaria)	7	Blagoy Georgiev	1	0	1
11	MF	(Belgium)	99	Jonathan Legear	1	0	1
11	DF	(Russia)	40	Rizvan Utsiyev	1	0	1
11	MF	(Brazil)	6	Adílson	1	0	1
11	MF	(Uruguay)	7	Facundo Píriz	1	0	1
11	MF	(Brazil)	20	Kanu	1	0	1
11				Own goal	1	0	1
				TOTALS	38	6	44

=== Disciplinary record ===
Number	Nation	Position	Name	Premier League		Russian Cup		Total	
Number	Nation	Position	Name	Yellow card	Red card	Yellow card	Red card	Yellow card	Red card
3	(Russia)	DF	Dmitri Yatchenko	4	0	0	0	4	0
4	(Finland)	DF	Juhani Ojala	1	0	0	0	1	0
5	(Brazil)	DF	Antonio Ferreira	4	0	0	0	4	0
6	(Brazil)	MF	Adílson	6	0	1	0	7	0
7	(Uruguay)	MF	Facundo Píriz	1	0	0	0	1	0
8	(Brazil)	MF	Maurício	3	0	0	0	3	0
9	(Brazil)	FW	Aílton	1	0	0	0	1	0
10	(Russia)	MF	Adlan Katsayev	1	0	0	0	1	0
12	(Ukraine)	GK	Yaroslav Hodzyur	1	0	0	0	1	0
13	(Russia)	FW	Zaur Sadayev	2	0	0	0	2	0
19	(Russia)	MF	Oleg Ivanov	4	1	2	0	6	1
20	(Brazil)	MF	Kanu	1	0	0	0	1	0
24	(Poland)	DF	Marcin Komorowski	8	0	1	0	9	0
31	(Poland)	MF	Maciej Rybus	3	0	0	0	3	0
40	(Russia)	DF	Rizvan Utsiyev	4	1	3	1	7	2
52	(Czech Republic)	DF	Martin Jiránek	1	0	0	0	1	0
55	(Russia)	FW	Igor Lebedenko	3	0	2	0	5	0
80	(Chad)	FW	Ezechiel Ndouassel	6	1	0	0	6	1
85	(Belarus)	GK	Anton Amelchenko	0	1	0	0	0	1
87	(Russia)	DF	Fedor Kudryashov	4	1	0	0	4	1
99	(Belgium)	MF	Jonathan Legear	1	0	0	0	1	0
Players away on loan:
25	(Poland)	DF	Piotr Polczak	1	0	1	0	2	0
Players who left Terek Grozny during the season:
7	(Bulgaria)	MF	Blagoy Georgiev	2	0	0	0	2	0
			TOTALS	62	5	10	1	72	6
