= Soslan Dzhanayev =

Russian footballer (born 1987)

Soslan Dzhanaev
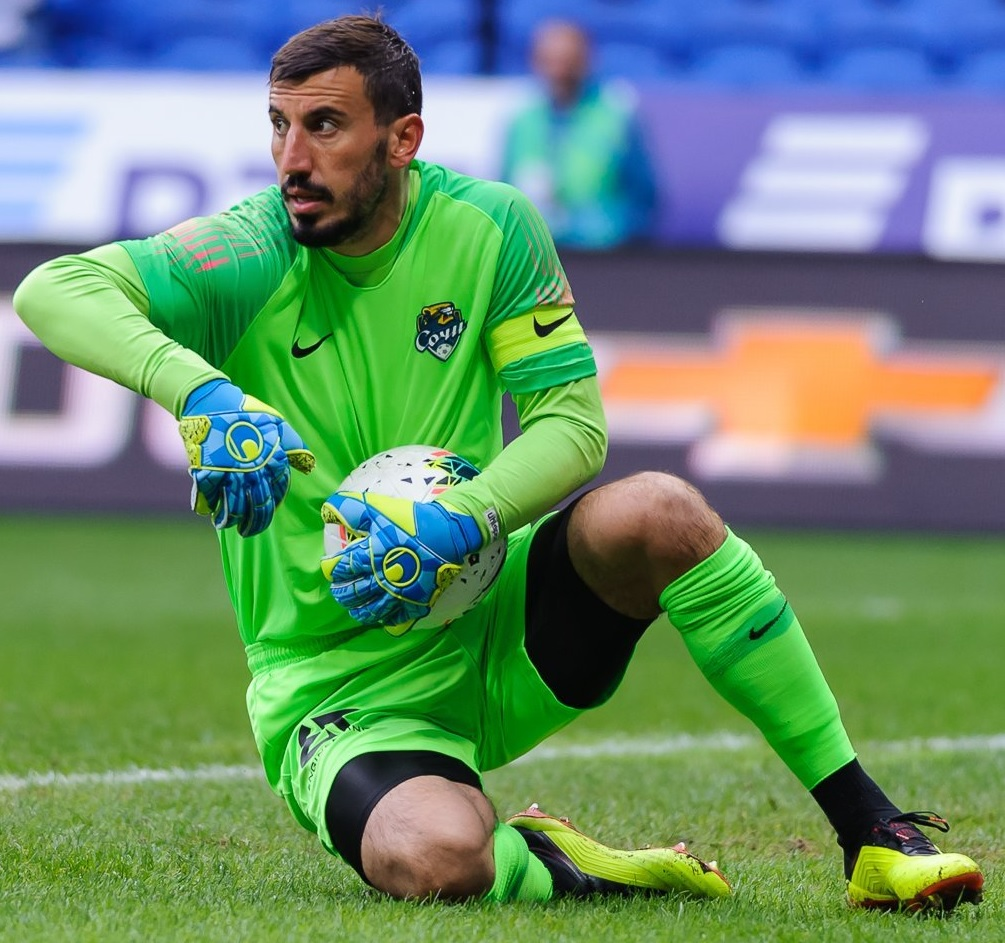
- Dzhanaev with PFC Sochi in 2019

Personal information
- Full name: Soslan Totrazovich Dzhanaev
- Date of birth: 13 March 1987 (age 39)
- Place of birth: Ordzhonikidze, Soviet Union
- Height: 1.88 m (6 ft 2 in)
- Position: Goalkeeper

Youth career
- Alania Vladikavkaz
- 1999–2006: CSKA Moscow

Senior career*
Years	Team	Apps	(Gls)
2007	KamAZ Naberezhnye Chelny	28	(0)
2008–2013	Spartak Moscow	38	(0)
2010–2012	→ Terek Grozny (loan)	41	(0)
2013	→ Alania Vladikavkaz (loan)	10	(0)
2014–2017	Rostov	43	(0)
2017–2018	Rubin Kazan	22	(0)
2019	Miedź Legnica	7	(0)
2019	Miedź Legnica II	3	(0)
2019–2023	Sochi	66	(0)
2023–2024	Baltika Kaliningrad	3	(0)

International career
2007–2009	Russia U-21	6	(0)
2011	Russia-2	3	(0)
2016–2020	Russia	3	(0)
- * Club domestic league appearances and goals

Soslan Totrazovich Dzhanaev (Russian: Сослан Тотразович Джанаев, Iron Ossetic: Джанайты Тотразы фырт Сослан; born 13 March 1987) is a Russian former professional footballer who played as a goalkeeper.

== Club career ==
On 8 January 2019, he was released from his contract with Rubin Kazan by mutual consent.

On 27 February 2019, he signed with Polish club Miedź Legnica until the end of the 2018–19 Ekstraklasa season.

On 16 July 2019, he joined Russian Premier League newcomer Sochi. On 20 October 2019 he saved two penalty kicks in a 1–1 away draw against Arsenal Tula. He also saved a penalty in the previous game, making it 3 penalty kick saves in 2 games. Dzhanayev left Sochi in June 2023.

On 29 August 2023, Dzhanayev signed with Baltika Kaliningrad.

== International career ==
In September 2009, Dzhanayev was called up to the Russia national football team for the first time for games against Germany and Azerbaijan. He was called up again in August 2016 for matches against Turkey and Ghana. He made his debut on 9 October 2016 in a friendly against Costa Rica. On 11 May 2018, he was included in Russia's extended 2018 FIFA World Cup squad. He was not included in the finalized World Cup squad. After a 3-year break, he was called up to the national team in August 2019 for the UEFA Euro 2020 qualifying matches against Scotland and Kazakhstan.

== Career statistics ==
As of match played 2 June 2024

Appearances and goals by club, season and competition
Club	Season	League			Cup		Continental		Total	
Club	Season	Division	Apps	Goals	Apps	Goals	Apps	Goals	Apps	Goals
KAMAZ	2007	Russian First League	28	0	0	0	–		28	0
Spartak Moscow	2008	Russian Premier League	0	0	2	0	0	0	2	0
Spartak Moscow	2009	Russian Premier League	26	0	1	0	–		27	0
Spartak Moscow	2010	Russian Premier League	12	0	0	0	–		12	0
Terek Grozny	2010	Russian Premier League	3	0	–		–		3	0
Terek Grozny	2011–12	Russian Premier League	37	0	2	0	–		39	0
Terek Grozny	2012–13	Russian Premier League	1	0	0	0	–		1	0
Terek Grozny	Total		41	0	2	0	0	0	43	0
Alania Vladikavkaz	2012–13	Russian Premier League	10	0	–		–		10	0
Spartak Moscow	2013–14	Russian Premier League	0	0	0	0	0	0	0	0
Rostov	2014–15	Russian Premier League	0	0	1	0	0	0	1	0
Rostov	2015–16	Russian Premier League	30	0	0	0	–		30	0
Rostov	2016–17	Russian Premier League	13	0	0	0	10 (Note: Appearances in the UEFA Champions League)	0	23	0
Rostov	Total		43	0	1	0	10	0	54	0
Rubin Kazan	2017–18	Russian Premier League	18	0	1	0	–		19	0
Rubin Kazan	2018–19	Russian Premier League	4	0	0	0	–		4	0
Rubin Kazan	Total		22	0	1	0	0	0	23	0
Miedź Legnica	2018–19	Ekstraklasa	7	0	0	0	–		7	0
Miedź Legnica II	2018–19	III liga	3	0	–		–		3	0
Sochi	2019–20	Russian Premier League	22	0	0	0	–		22	0
Sochi	2020–21	Russian Premier League	21	0	1	0	–		22	0
Sochi	2021–22	Russian Premier League	14	0	1	0	1 (Note: Appearance in the UEFA Europa Conference League)	0	16	0
Sochi	2022–23	Russian Premier League	9	0	2	0	–		11	0
Sochi	Total		66	0	4	0	1	0	71	0
Baltika Kaliningrad	2023–24	Russian Premier League	3	0	1	0	–		4	0
Career total			261	0	12	0	11	0	284	0

== Honours ==
Spartak Moscow

- Russian Premier League runner-up: 2009

Rostov

- Russian Premier League runner-up: 2015-16

Individual

- Lev Yashin Prize "Goalkeeper of the year": 2015–16
- List of 33 best football player of the Russian Championship: 2015–16
