= Oleg Ivanov =

Russian footballer

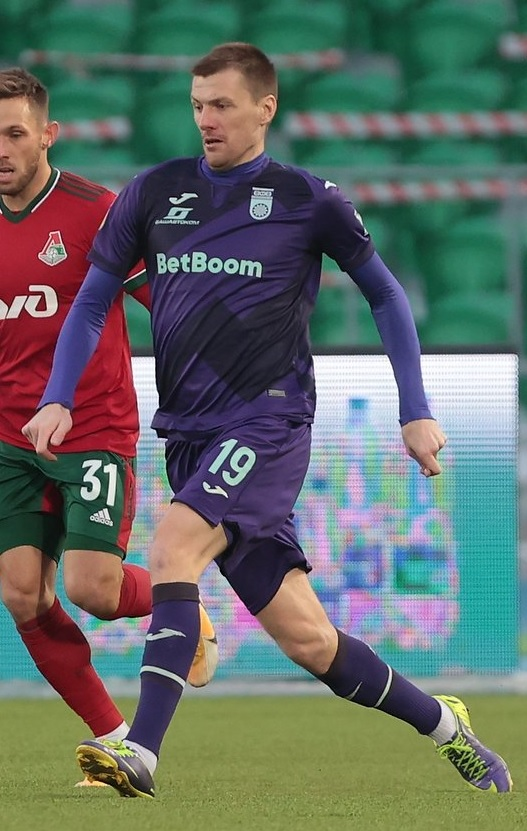
- Ivanov playing for FC Ufa in 2021

Personal information
- Full name: Oleg Aleksandrovich Ivanov
- Date of birth: 4 August 1986 (age 40)
- Place of birth: Moscow, Russian SFSR
- Height: 1.92 m (6 ft 4 in)
- Position: Midfielder

Team information
- Current team: Rubin Kazan (assistant manager)

Youth career
- 1994–1996: Lokomotiv Moscow
- 1996–2004: Spartak Moscow

Senior career*
Years	Team	Apps	(Gls)
2004	Spartak Moscow	2	(0)
2005	Khimki	32	(7)
2006–2007	Kuban Krasnodar	57	(9)
2008–2010	Krylia Sovetov	64	(6)
2011	Rostov	14	(0)
2012–2020	Akhmat Grozny	226	(16)
2021–2022	Ufa	32	(3)
2022–2026	Rubin Kazan	79	(2)

International career
2005	Russia U19	12	(2)
2006–2007	Russia U21	7	(1)
2015–2016	Russia	5	(0)

Managerial career
- 2026–: Rubin Kazan (assistant)
- * Club domestic league appearances and goals

Oleg Aleksandrovich Ivanov (Russian: Олег Александрович Иванов; born 4 August 1986) is a Russian professional football coach and a former central midfielder who is an assistant manager with Rubin Kazan.

== Club career ==
=== Krylia Sovetov Samara ===
He made his debut for Krylia Sovetov on 22 March 2008.

=== Akhmat Grozny ===
On 10 January 2021, his contract with Akhmat Grozny was terminated by mutual consent after 10 years at the club.

=== Ufa ===
On 21 January 2021, he signed a 1.5-year contract with Ufa.

== International career ==
Ivanov was selected for the Russian national team provisional squad for Euro 2008. He was called up after the injury to Pavel Pogrebnyak. After a long pause, he was called up for the national team again in February 2013 for a friendly against Iceland. He finally made his national team debut on 7 June 2015 in a friendly game against Belarus.

== Career statistics ==
=== Club ===
As of match played 17 May 2026

Club	Season	League			Cup		Europe		Other		Total	
Club	Season	Division	Apps	Goals	Apps	Goals	Apps	Goals	Apps	Goals	Apps	Goals
Spartak Moscow	2004	Russian Premier League	2	0	—		3 (Note: Two appearances in the UEFA Cup, one appearance in the UEFA Intertoto Cup)	0	—		5	0
Khimki	2005	Russian First League	32	7	4	1	—		—		36	8
Kuban Krasnodar	2006	Russian First League	39	5	1	1	—		—		40	6
Kuban Krasnodar	2007	Russian Premier League	18	4	2	0	—		—		20	4
Kuban Krasnodar	Total		57	9	3	1	0	0	0	0	60	10
Krylia Sovetov Samara	2008	Russian Premier League	22	2	2	1	—		—		24	3
Krylia Sovetov Samara	2009	Russian Premier League	27	2	0	0	2 (Note: Appearances in the UEFA Europa League)	0	—		29	2
Krylia Sovetov Samara	2010	Russian Premier League	15	2	1	0	—		—		16	2
Krylia Sovetov Samara	Total		64	6	3	1	2	0	0	0	69	7
Rostov	2011–12	Russian Premier League	14	0	3	1	—		—		17	1
Akhmat Grozny	2011–12	Russian Premier League	10	0	1	0	—		—		11	0
Akhmat Grozny	2012–13	Russian Premier League	26	3	3	0	—		—		29	3
Akhmat Grozny	2013–14	Russian Premier League	29	4	3	0	—		—		32	4
Akhmat Grozny	2014–15	Russian Premier League	27	1	1	0	—		—		28	1
Akhmat Grozny	2015–16	Russian Premier League	28	1	1	0	—		—		29	1
Akhmat Grozny	2016–17	Russian Premier League	20	1	2	0	—		—		22	1
Akhmat Grozny	2017–18	Russian Premier League	19	0	0	0	—		—		19	0
Akhmat Grozny	2018–19	Russian Premier League	27	5	1	0	—		—		28	5
Akhmat Grozny	2019–20	Russian Premier League	27	1	3	0	—		—		30	1
Akhmat Grozny	2020–21	Russian Premier League	13	0	1	1	—		—		14	1
Akhmat Grozny	Total		226	16	16	1	0	0	0	0	242	17
Ufa	2020–21	Russian Premier League	9	1	1	0	—		—		10	1
Ufa	2021–22	Russian Premier League	23	2	1	0	—		1 (Note: Appearance in relegation play-offs)	0	25	2
Ufa	Total		32	3	2	0	0	0	1	0	35	3
Rubin Kazan	2022–23	Russian First League	23	2	0	0	—		—		23	2
Rubin Kazan	2023–24	Russian Premier League	10	0	2	0	—		—		12	0
Rubin Kazan	2024–25	Russian Premier League	28	0	7	0	—		—		35	0
Rubin Kazan	2025–26	Russian Premier League	18	0	6	1	—		—		24	1
Rubin Kazan	Total		79	2	15	1	0	0	0	0	94	3
Career total			506	43	46	6	5	0	1	0	558	49
