= Yaroslav Hodzyur =

Ukrainian-Russian footballer

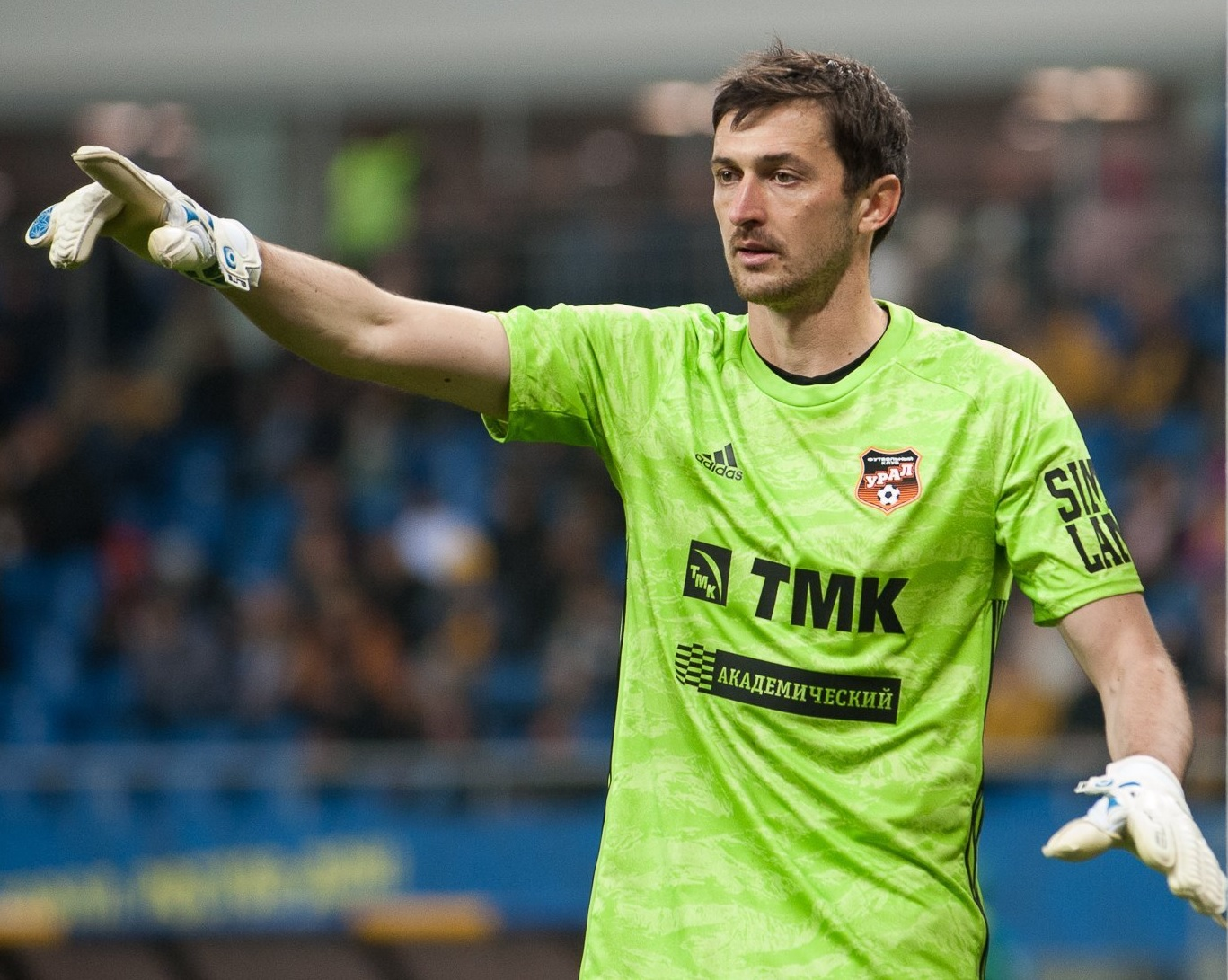
- Hodzyur with Ural in 2019

Personal information
- Full name: Yaroslav Mykhaylovych Hodzyur
- Date of birth: 6 March 1985 (age 41)
- Place of birth: Ivano-Frankivsk, Ukrainian SSR
- Height: 1.94 m (6 ft 4 in)
- Position: Goalkeeper

Youth career
- 1999–2002: Sportive School Ivano-Frankivsk

Senior career*
| Years | Team | Apps | (Gls) |
| 2002–2004 | Chornohora Ivano-Frankivsk | 46 | (0) |
| 2004–2006 | Hazovyk-Skala Stryi | 44 | (0) |
| 2006–2007 | Krylia Sovetov Samara | 0 | (0) |
| 2008 | Dynamo-2 Kyiv | 4 | (0) |
| 2008–2017 | Terek Grozny | 98 | (0) |
| 2017–2022 | Ural Yekaterinburg | 100 | (0) |
- * Club domestic league appearances and goals

Yaroslav Mykhaylovych Hodzyur (Russian: Ярослав Михайлович Годзюр, born 6 March 1985) is a former footballer who played as a goalkeeper. He has dual citizenship of Ukraine and Russia.

== Club career ==
On 4 February 2022, Hodzyur extended his contract with Ural Yekaterinburg to June 2023. On 1 March 2022, the contract was terminated by mutual consent following the Russian invasion of Ukraine.

== Career statistics ==
As of 11 December 2021

| Club | Season | League | | | Cup | | Continental | | Total | |
| Club | Season | Division | Apps | Goals | Apps | Goals | Apps | Goals | Apps | Goals |
|---|---|---|---|---|---|---|---|---|---|---|
| Chornohora Ivano-Frankivsk | 2001–02 | USL | 5 | 0 | 0 | 0 | – | | 5 | 0 |
| Chornohora Ivano-Frankivsk | 2002–03 | USL | 2 | 0 | 0 | 0 | – | | 2 | 0 |
| Chornohora Ivano-Frankivsk | 2003–04 | USL | 25 | 0 | 0 | 0 | – | | 25 | 0 |
| Chornohora Ivano-Frankivsk | 2004–05 | USL | 14 | 0 | 1 | 0 | – | | 15 | 0 |
| Chornohora Ivano-Frankivsk | Total | | 46 | 0 | 1 | 0 | 0 | 0 | 27 | 0 |
| Hazovyk-Skala Stryi | 2004–05 | UFL | 13 | 0 | – | | – | | 13 | 0 |
| Hazovyk-Skala Stryi | 2005–06 | UFL | 31 | 0 | 3 | 0 | – | | 34 | 0 |
| Hazovyk-Skala Stryi | Total | | 44 | 0 | 4 | 0 | 0 | 0 | 47 | 0 |
| Krylia Sovetov Samara | 2006 | RPL | 0 | 0 | 0 | 0 | – | | 0 | 0 |
| Krylia Sovetov Samara | 2007 | RPL | 0 | 0 | 0 | 0 | – | | 0 | 0 |
| Krylia Sovetov Samara | Total | | 0 | 0 | 0 | 0 | 0 | 0 | 0 | 0 |
| Dynamo Kyiv | 2007–08 | UPL | 0 | 0 | 0 | 0 | – | | 0 | 0 |
| Dynamo-2 Kyiv | 2007–08 | UFL | 4 | 0 | – | | – | | 4 | 0 |
| Terek Grozny | 2008 | RPL | 2 | 0 | 1 | 0 | – | | 3 | 0 |
| Terek Grozny | 2009 | RPL | 0 | 0 | 0 | 0 | – | | 0 | 0 |
| Terek Grozny | 2010 | RPL | 9 | 0 | 0 | 0 | – | | 9 | 0 |
| Terek Grozny | 2011–12 | RPL | 9 | 0 | 1 | 0 | – | | 10 | 0 |
| Terek Grozny | 2012–13 | RPL | 21 | 0 | 1 | 0 | – | | 22 | 0 |
| Terek Grozny | 2013–14 | RPL | 19 | 0 | 3 | 0 | – | | 22 | 0 |
| Terek Grozny | 2014–15 | RPL | 28 | 0 | 0 | 0 | – | | 28 | 0 |
| Terek Grozny | 2015–16 | RPL | 9 | 0 | 1 | 0 | – | | 10 | 0 |
| Terek Grozny | 2016–17 | RPL | 1 | 0 | 0 | 0 | – | | 1 | 0 |
| Terek Grozny | Total | | 98 | 0 | 7 | 0 | 0 | 0 | 105 | 0 |
| Ural Yekaterinburg | 2016–17 | RPL | 30 | 0 | 0 | 0 | – | | 30 | 0 |
| Ural Yekaterinburg | 2018–19 | RPL | 30 | 0 | 6 | 0 | – | | 36 | 0 |
| Ural Yekaterinburg | 2019–20 | RPL | 25 | 0 | 3 | 0 | – | | 28 | 0 |
| Ural Yekaterinburg | 2020–21 | RPL | 12 | 0 | 2 | 0 | – | | 14 | 0 |
| Ural Yekaterinburg | 2021–22 | RPL | 3 | 0 | 1 | 0 | – | | 4 | 0 |
| Ural Yekaterinburg | Total | | 100 | 0 | 12 | 0 | 0 | 0 | 112 | 0 |
| Career total | | | 292 | 0 | 23 | 0 | 0 | 0 | 315 | 0 |
