= Maurício (footballer, born October 1988) =

Brazilian footballer

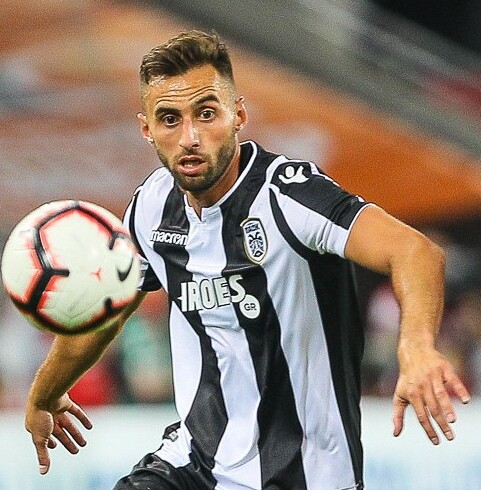
- Maurício with PAOK in 2018

Personal information
- Full name: Maurício José da Silveira Júnior
- Date of birth: 21 October 1988 (age 38)
- Place of birth: São José dos Campos, Brazil
- Height: 1.84 m (6 ft 0 in)
- Position: Midfielder

Team information
- Current team: São José-SP
- Number: 8

Youth career
- 1999–2006: Corinthians
- 2006–2007: Fluminense

Senior career*
Years	Team	Apps	(Gls)
2007–2009	Fluminense	58	(4)
2009–2016	Terek Grozny	162	(28)
2016–2017	Zenit Saint Petersburg	30	(1)
2017–2020	PAOK	69	(8)
2020–2022	Panathinaikos	50	(7)
2022–2023	Rodina Moscow	7	(0)
2023–2024	Portimonense	20	(2)
2024	Athletic-MG	7	(0)
2025	Inter de Limeira	6	(1)
2026–	São José-SP	0	(0)

International career
2005	Brazil U17	5	(0)
- * Club domestic league appearances and goals as of 20 September 2025

Maurício José da Silveira Júnior (born 21 October 1988), simply known as Maurício, is a Brazilian professional footballer who plays as a midfielder for São José-SP.

== Club career ==
=== Early career ===
Born in São José dos Campos, São Paulo, Maurício joined the youth sides of Corinthians in 1999, aged 11. He left the club in 2006, after seven seasons, and joined Fluminense in March of that year, but due to registration issues, he was only able to play for the club's under-20 team in October.

=== Fluminense ===
After impressing with the under-20s in the 2007 Copa São Paulo de Futebol Júnior, Maurício made his senior – and Série A – debut on 20 May of that year, starting in a 2–0 home loss to Grêmio. Despite being rarely used in that year, he was a part of the squad which won the 2007 Copa do Brasil.

=== Terek Grozny ===
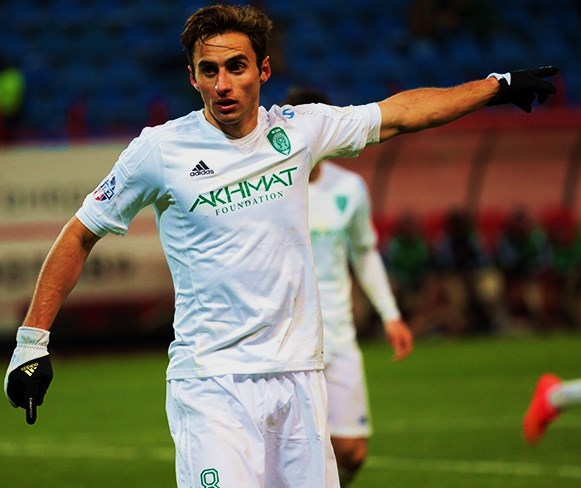
Maurício in action for Terek Grozny in 2014

On 2 February 2010, Maurício signed for Russian Premier League side Terek Grozny. He scored 29 goals in 172 appearances for the club.

=== Zenit Saint Petersburg ===
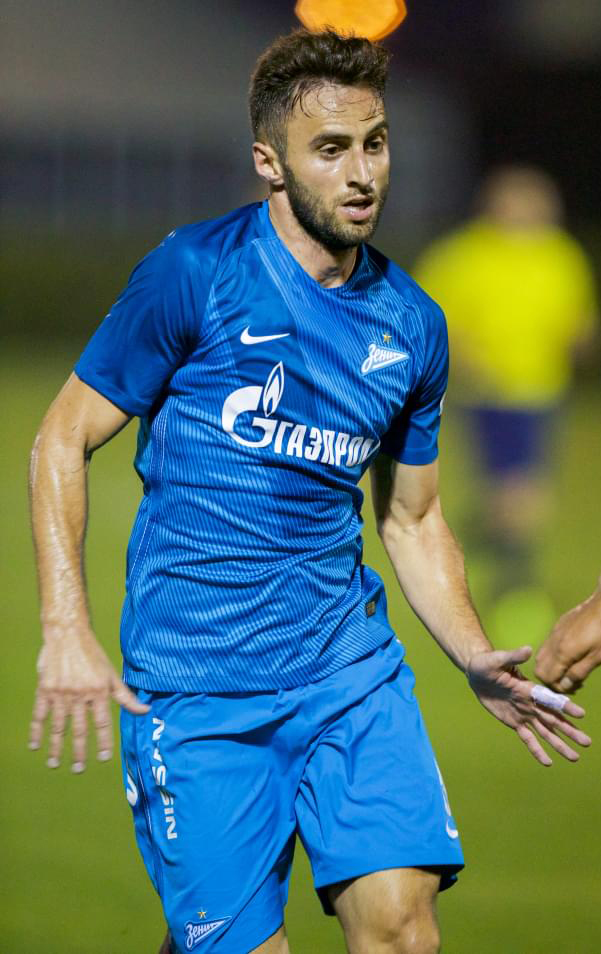
Maurício playing for Zenit in 2017

On 17 January 2016, Maurício moved to Zenit Saint Petersburg on a six-month contract, with the option of an extension at the end of it. On 19 May, the club extended his contract until the end of the 2018–19 season.

On 24 July 2017, Maurício was released from his contract by mutual consent.

=== PAOK ===
On 31 August 2017, PAOK announced the signing of Maurício on a three-year contract. On 30 October, he scored both goals as PAOK won 2–0 at home to Asteras Tripolis in the Super League Greece.

On 7 October 2018, Maurício opened the score in a 2–0 home win game against Apollon Smyrnis, his first goal of the 2018–19 season; he was also named man of the match. On 3 February 2019, his goal in a 1–1 draw with AEK Athens helped PAOK remain unbeaten in the Super League. The following 10 March, he suffered an anterior cruciate ligament injury which kept him out until late September.

Maurício returned to action in an away match against AEK Athens on 29 September 2019.

=== Panathinaikos ===
On 11 October 2020, it was announced that Panathinaikos had signed Maurício on a two-year contract for an undisclosed fee.

=== Rodina Moscow ===
On 20 September 2022, Rodina Moscow announced the signing of Maurício.

=== Portimonense ===
On 25 January 2023, Maurício signed with Portuguese Primeira Liga club Portimonense. Exactly one year later, his contract was terminated by mutual agreement.

=== Later career ===
On 24 July 2024, Maurício returned to his home country after being announced at Série C side Athletic-MG. Rarely used, he moved to Inter de Limeira on 21 December.

After leaving Inter at the end of 2025 season, Maurício spent the first half of the 2026 campaign without a club before signing for hometown side São José-SP on 12 June.

== International career ==
Maurício indicated that he would be likely to accept a call-up for Russia national football team if asked.

== Career statistics ==
=== Club ===
As of 14 June 2026

Appearances and goals by club, season and competition
Club	Season	League			State league (Note: Includes Campeonato Carioca, Campeonato Paulista)		National cup (Note: Includes Russian Cup, Greek Cup)		League cup (Note: Includes Taça da Liga)		Continental		Other		Total	
Club	Season	Division	Apps	Goals	Apps	Goals	Apps	Goals	Apps	Goals	Apps	Goals	Apps	Goals	Apps	Goals
Fluminense	2007	Série A	13	0	—		0	0	—		—		—		13	0
Fluminense	2008	Série A	22	1	9	1	—		—		11 (Note: Appearance(s) in Copa Libertadores)	0	—		42	2
Fluminense	2009	Série A	10	1	4	1	5	0	—		6 (Note: Appearance(s) in Copa Sudamericana)	0	—		25	2
Fluminense	Total		45	2	13	2	5	0	—		17	0	—		80	4
Terek Grozny	2010	Russian Premier League	28	4	—		0	0	—		—		—		28	4
Terek Grozny	2011–12	Russian Premier League	37	9	—		3	0	—		—		—		40	9
Terek Grozny	2012–13	Russian Premier League	23	2	—		2	0	—		—		—		25	2
Terek Grozny	2013–14	Russian Premier League	29	6	—		3	0	—		—		—		32	6
Terek Grozny	2014–15	Russian Premier League	28	4	—		1	0	—		—		—		29	4
Terek Grozny	2015–16	Russian Premier League	17	3	—		1	0	—		—		—		18	3
Terek Grozny	Total		162	28	—		10	0	—		—		—		172	28
Zenit Saint Petersburg	2015–16	Russian Premier League	11	1	—		2	1	—		2 (Note: Appearances in UEFA Champions League)	0	—		15	2
Zenit Saint Petersburg	2016–17	Russian Premier League	19	0	—		2	0	—		5 (Note: Appearances in UEFA Europa League)	1	1 (Note: Appearance in Russian Super Cup)	1	27	2
Zenit Saint Petersburg	Total		30	1	—		4	1	—		7	1	1	1	42	4
PAOK	2017–18	Super League Greece	22	3	—		5	1	—		—		—		27	4
PAOK	2018–19	Super League Greece	20	5	—		2	0	—		10 (Note: Six appearances in UEFA Champions League, four appearances in UEFA Europa League)	0	—		32	5
PAOK	2019–20	Super League Greece	27	0	—		6	0	—		—		—		33	0
PAOK	Total		69	8	—		13	1	—		10	0	—		92	9
Panathinaikos	2020–21	Super League Greece	25	2	—		1	0	—		—		—		26	2
Panathinaikos	2021–22	Super League Greece	25	5	—		5	0	—		—		—		30	5
Panathinaikos	Total		50	7	—		6	0	—		—		—		55	7
Rodina Moscow	2022–23	Russian First League	7	0	—		2	0	—		—		—		9	0
Portimonense	2022–23	Primeira Liga	13	3	—		0	0	2	0	—		—		15	3
Portimonense	2023–24	Primeira Liga	7	0	—		2	0	2	0	—		—		11	0
Portimonense	Total		20	2	—		2	0	4	0	—		—		26	3
Athletic-MG	2024	Série C	7	0	—		—		—		—		—		7	0
Inter de Limeira	2025	Série D	3	1	3	0	1	0	—		—		10 (Note: Appearance(s) in Copa Paulista)	0	17	1
São José-SP	2026	Paulista A2	—		—		—		—		—		0	0	0	0
Career total			387	50	16	2	43	2	4	0	34	1	11	1	493	56

== Honours ==
Zenit Saint Petersburg

- Russian Cup: 2015–16
- Russian Super Cup: 2016

PAOK

- Super League Greece: 2018–19
- Greek Cup: 2017–18, 2018–19

Panathinaikos

- Greek Cup: 2021–22
