= Blagoy Georgiev =

Bulgarian footballer (born 1981)

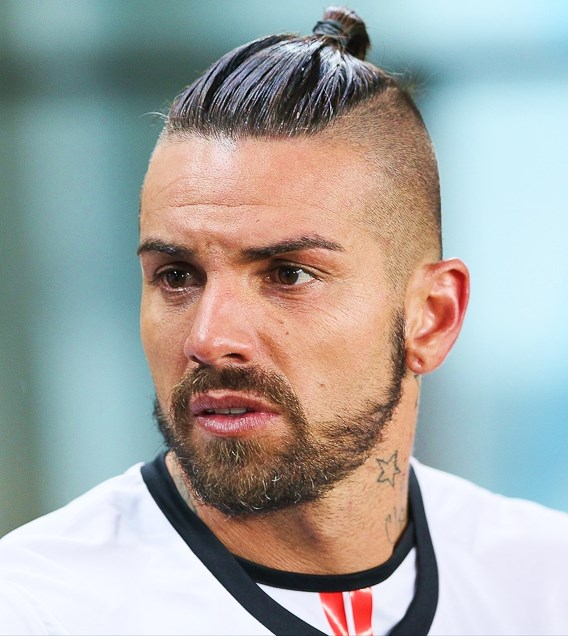
- Georgiev in 2013

Personal information
- Full name: Blagoy Zhorev Georgiev
- Date of birth: 21 December 1981 (age 44)
- Place of birth: Sofia, Bulgaria
- Height: 1.84 m (6 ft 0 in)
- Position: Attacking midfielder

Youth career
- Slavia Sofia

Senior career*
| Years | Team | Apps | (Gls) |
| 1999–2006 | Slavia Sofia | 172 | (46) |
| 2006 | → Deportivo Alavés (loan) | 10 | (0) |
| 2006–2008 | Red Star Belgrade | 20 | (2) |
| 2007–2008 | → MSV Duisburg (loan) | 31 | (2) |
| 2009–2012 | Terek Grozny | 105 | (7) |
| 2013–2014 | Amkar Perm | 36 | (3) |
| 2014–2016 | Rubin Kazan | 37 | (1) |
| 2016–2017 | Orenburg | 30 | (7) |
| Total | | 441 | (68) |

International career
| 2000–2003 | Bulgaria U21 | 15 | (0) |
| 2004–2011 | Bulgaria | 50 | (5) |
- * Club domestic league appearances and goals

Blagoy Zhorev Georgiev (Bulgarian: Благой Жорев Георгиев; born 21 December 1981) is a Bulgarian former professional footballer who played as a midfielder.

Some of his more prominent clubs include Slavia Sofia, Red Star Belgrade, Terek Grozny, Amkar Perm, Rubin Kazan and Orenburg. He also earned 50 caps while representing Bulgaria on an international level.

== Career ==
=== Slavia Sofia ===
Georgiev was born in Sofia. He is a product of the Slavia Sofia youth academy. He signed a professional contract in June 1999 and then made his first team debut under Miroslav Mironov' management three months later, on 17 October, in a 3–1 home win over Pirin Blagoevgrad. Georgiev's first goal came on 27 November 1999, when he scored a last-minute against Beroe Stara Zagora to secure a 1–1 away draw. On 11 March 2000, he netted Slavia's only goal in their league loss, a 2–1 defeat against Velbazhd Kyustendil. He then scored in Slavia's 3–2 win against Botev Plovdiv on 22 April, taking his tally for the season to 3 goals.

On 27 September 2003, Georgiev scored his first-ever hat-trick in his career, scoring four goals in a 5–2 away win over Chernomorets Burgas. After scoring his 17th league goal in the final game of the 2003–04 season, a 2–0 win against Naftex Burgas, he ended the campaign in joint second place with Stoyko Sakaliev in the race for the Bulgarian A PFG golden boot.

During his six years at Slavia Stadium, he scored 46 league goals in 172 matches.

==== Alaves (loan) ====
On 13 January 2006, Deportivo Alavés confirmed Georgiev would join on loan until the end of the season. He made his La Liga debut a week later, during Alaves's 2–0 loss against Barcelona at Camp Nou. He spent most of his time with Alaves on the bench. He returned to Bulgaria at the end of the season having made 10 appearances in Alaves's unsuccessful battle against relegation.

==== Red Star ====
On 14 June 2006, Serbian side Red Star Belgrade signed Georgiev on a three-year deal.

==== Duisburg (loan) ====
On 28 May 2007, Georgiev joined Bundesliga side MSV Duisburg on loan until the end of the 2007–08 season. On 14 March 2008, he scored his first goal in a 2–1 loss against Schalke 04. On 4 May, he scored a last-minute winning goal for 3–2 over Bayer Leverkusen. During the season, he earned 31 appearances.

=== Terek Grozny ===
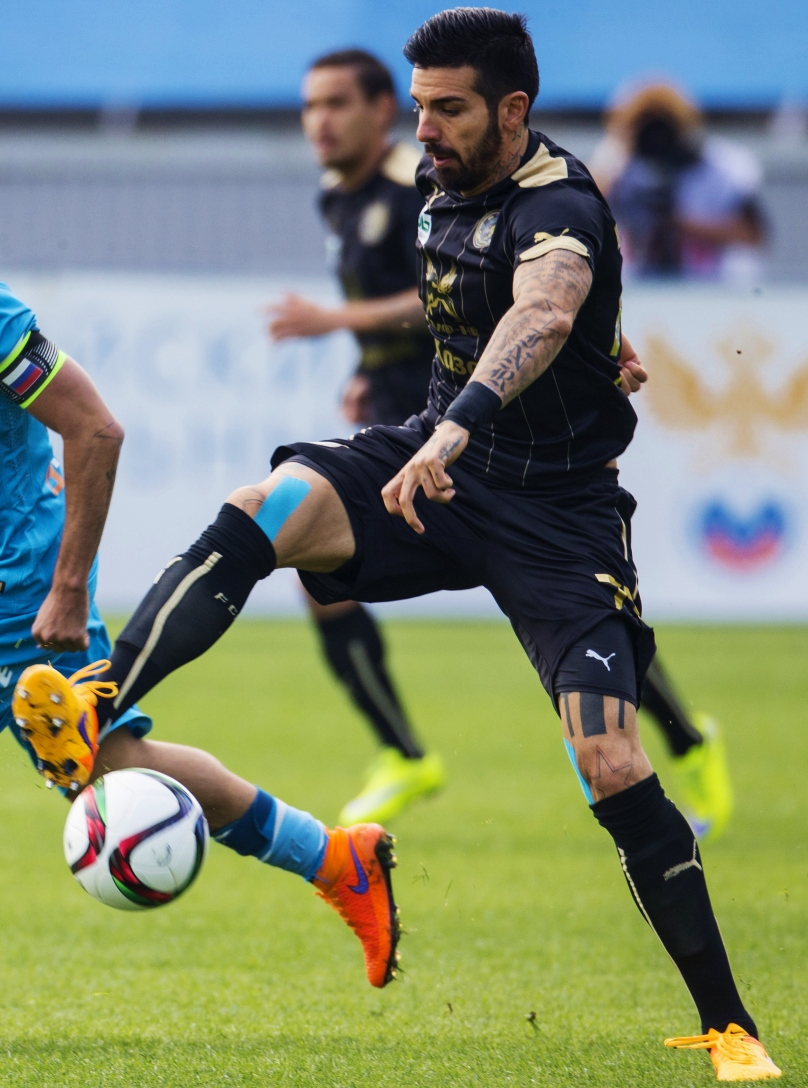
Georgiev playing for Rubin Kazan in 2015

On 6 January 2009, Georgiev signed a four-year contract with Russian side Terek Grozny for 1.5 million Euros. He made his Russian Premier League debut on the opening day of the 2009 season, on 15 March, in a 1–0 home win over Spartak Nalchik. Georgiev's first goal came on 19 July, when he scored in a 3–2 home win against Zenit Saint Petersburg, for which he was awarded with a Land Rover by the head of Chechnya Ramzan Kadyrov.

On the eve of the 2010 season, Georgiev was selected by manager Anatoly Baidachny, as the replacement captain after Timur Dzhabrailov's retirement. On 10 May 2010, he scored the opening goal of the league game against CSKA Moscow which Terek lost 1–4. Three days later, he provided two assists in a 2–0 home victory over Saturn Ramenskoye.

Georgiev scored his first league goal of the 2011 season and the winner against Anzhi Makhachkala, in a 1–0 victory on 20 May. On 13 August, he scored his second goal of the season, in a 6–2 defeat at Dynamo Moscow. On 5 November, in a 2–0 home victory over Krasnodar, Blago assisted Musawengosi Mguni for the second goal. On 28 December 2011, few days after his 30th birthday, he was reported to have become a target for Lokomotiv Moscow.

On 4 November 2012, Georgiev marked his 100th Russian Premier League game by scoring a penalty in a 3–1 loss against Anzhi Makhachkala.

=== Amkar Perm ===
Georgiev signed with Amkar Perm on 19 December 2012 on a three-year deal.

=== Rubin Kazan ===
On 15 August 2014, Georgiev joined Rubin Kazan, signing a two-year deal. Following his transfer he took the number 77 shirt. He made his debut two days later, playing the full 90 minutes in a 1–1 home draw against Lokomotiv Moscow. His first league goal for Rubin gave them a 2–1 win over Torpedo Moscow on 29 September.

=== Orenburg ===
Georgiev transferred to FC Orenburg before the 2016–17 season as the club made their debut in the Russian Premier League. Orenburg was relegated at the end of the season, but he stayed on to play in the second-tier Russian Football National League. On 29 December 2017, he was released from his contract by mutual consent.

=== Retirement ===
The day after he resigned with FC Orenburg, Georgiev announced that he would retire from professional football and noted that he was not retiring because of not being in shape, but because of lack of motivation.

== International career ==
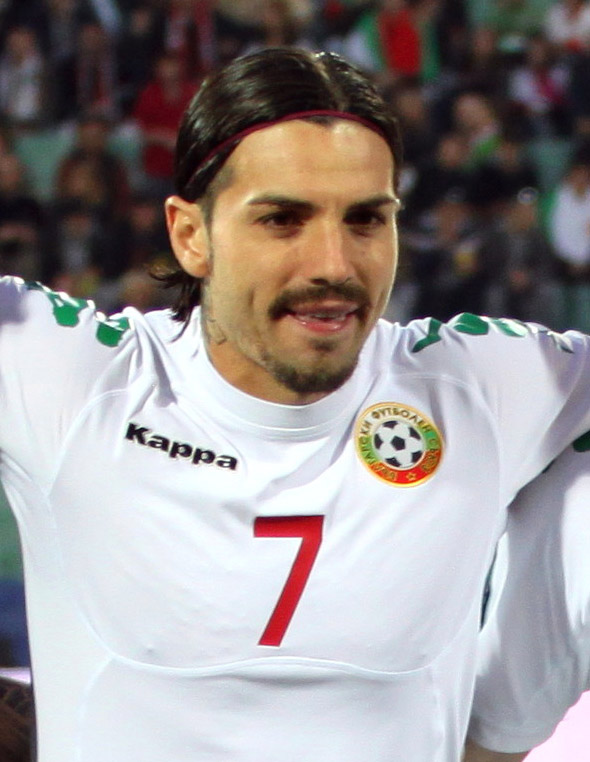
Georgiev with Bulgaria in 2011

A Bulgaria international, Georgiev was also previously a member of the country's under-21 team. He has been capped 50 times and scored 5 goals for Bulgaria. On 11 October 2011, he announced his retirement from Bulgarian national team. In September 2012, it was revealed that Georgiev was considering returning to the national team.

== Personal life ==
Georgiev is a devout Christian and has a number of faith-related tattoos.

Georgiev previously had a fling with singer Liana and was formerly in a long-term relationship with gymnast Hristina Vitanova (with whom he has two children - Yoanna and David). Georgiev was then engaged to Russian dancer Esmer Omerova, the mother of his third child - Elay. Since 2018 he has been together with model Zlatka Raykova, with whom he also has a child, named Blagoy Jr. and born in 2019.

In 2015, Georgiev had been charged with vandalism after carving his initials into Rome's Colosseum with a coin.

== Career statistics ==
=== Club ===
Appearances and goals by club, season and competition
| Club | Season | League | | | Cup | | Continental | | Total | |
| Club | Season | Apps | Goals | Apps | Goals | Apps | Goals | Apps | Goals | |
|---|---|---|---|---|---|---|---|---|---|---|
| Slavia Sofia | 1999–2000 | A Group | 16 | 3 | 3 | 0 | — | | 19 | 3 |
| Slavia Sofia | 2000–01 | A Group | 19 | 0 | 1 | 0 | — | | 20 | 0 |
| Slavia Sofia | 2001–02 | A Group | 29 | 3 | 3 | 1 | — | | 32 | 4 |
| Slavia Sofia | 2002–03 | A Group | 24 | 7 | 5 | 1 | — | | 29 | 8 |
| Slavia Sofia | 2003–04 | A Group | 29 | 17 | 1 | 0 | — | | 30 | 17 |
| Slavia Sofia | 2004–05 | A Group | 28 | 11 | 1 | 0 | — | | 29 | 11 |
| Slavia Sofia | 2005–06 | A Group | 14 | 3 | 1 | 0 | — | | 14 | 4 |
| Slavia Sofia | 2008–09 | A Group | 13 | 2 | 1 | 0 | — | | 14 | 2 |
| Slavia Sofia | Total | | 172 | 46 | 16 | 2 | 0 | 0 | 188 | 48 |
| Deportivo Alavés (loan) | 2005–06 | La Liga | 10 | 0 | ? | ? | — | | 10 | 0 |
| Red Star Belgrade (loan) | 2006–07 | Serbian SuperLiga | 20 | 2 | 1 | 0 | 6 | 0 | 27 | 2 |
| MSV Duisburg (loan) | 2007–08 | Bundesliga | 31 | 2 | 2 | 1 | — | | 33 | 3 |
| Terek Grozny | 2009 | Russian Premier League | 27 | 1 | 0 | 0 | — | | 27 | 1 |
| Terek Grozny | 2010 | Russian Premier League | 19 | 1 | 1 | 0 | — | | 20 | 1 |
| Terek Grozny | 2011–12 | Russian Premier League | 40 | 4 | 3 | 0 | — | | 43 | 4 |
| Terek Grozny | 2012–13 | Russian Premier League | 19 | 1 | 2 | 0 | — | | 21 | 1 |
| Terek Grozny | Total | | 105 | 7 | 6 | 0 | 0 | 0 | 111 | 7 |
| Amkar Perm | 2012–13 | Russian Premier League | 10 | 2 | 0 | 0 | — | | 10 | 2 |
| Amkar Perm | 2013–14 | Russian Premier League | 23 | 1 | 1 | 0 | — | | 24 | 1 |
| Amkar Perm | 2014–15 | Russian Premier League | 3 | 0 | 0 | 0 | — | | 3 | 0 |
| Amkar Perm | Total | | 36 | 3 | 1 | 0 | 0 | 0 | 37 | 3 |
| Rubin Kazan | 2014–15 | Russian Premier League | 22 | 1 | 3 | 0 | — | | 25 | 1 |
| Rubin Kazan | 2015–16 | Russian Premier League | 15 | 0 | 0 | 0 | 9 | 1 | 24 | 1 |
| Rubin Kazan | Total | | 37 | 1 | 3 | 0 | 9 | 1 | 49 | 2 |
| Orenburg | 2016–17 | Russian Premier League | 23 | 6 | 1 | 0 | — | | 24 | 6 |
| Orenburg | 2017–18 | Russian Premier League | 7 | 1 | 1 | 0 | — | | 8 | 1 |
| Orenburg | Total | | 30 | 7 | 2 | 0 | — | | 32 | 7 |
| Career total | | | 441 | 68 | 30 | 3 | 15 | 1 | 486 | 72 |

=== International goals ===
| # | Date | Venue | Opponent | Score | Result | Competition |
|---|---|---|---|---|---|---|
| 1 | 8 February 2007 | Nicosia, Cyprus | Cyprus | 0–3 | 0–3 | Friendly |
| 2 | 14 November 2007 | Celje, Slovenia | Slovenia | 0–3 | 0–3 | UEFA Euro 2008 Qual. |
| 3 | 6 September 2008 | Podgorica, Montenegro | Montenegro | 2–2 | 2–2 | World Cup 2010 Qual. |
| 4 | 19 November 2008 | Belgrade, Serbia | Serbia | 6–1 | 6–1 | Friendly |
| 5 | 18 November 2009 | Ta' Qali, Malta | Malta | 1–3 | 1–4 | Friendly |

== Honours ==
Red Star Belgrade

- Serbian SuperLiga: 2006–07
- Serbian Cup: 2006–07
