= Syarhey Amelyanchuk =

Belarusian footballer and coach

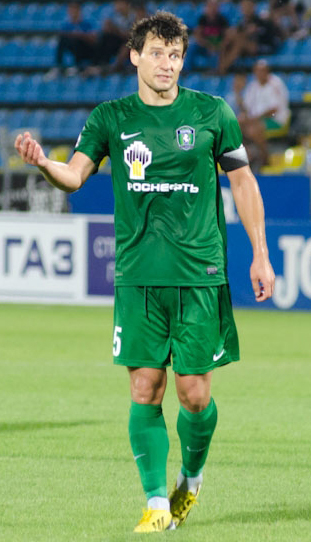
- With Tom Tomsk in 2013

Personal information
- Full name: Syarhey Pyatrovich Amelyanchuk
- Date of birth: 8 August 1980 (age 46)
- Place of birth: Gomel, Belarusian SSR, Soviet Union
- Height: 1.76 m (5 ft 9 in)
- Position: Defender

Youth career
- RUOR Minsk

Senior career*
Years	Team	Apps	(Gls)
1998	RUOR Minsk	12	(0)
1998	Real Minsk	8	(0)
1999–2000	Torpedo-MAZ Minsk	45	(2)
2001–2002	Legia Warsaw	38	(1)
2003–2004	Arsenal Kyiv	53	(7)
2005	Lokomotiv Moscow	13	(0)
2006	Shinnik Yaroslavl	27	(1)
2007–2008	Rostov	41	(3)
2008–2011	Terek Grozny	96	(1)
2012–2013	Tom Tomsk	46	(2)
2014–2017	Minsk	81	(3)
Total		460	(20)

International career
2000–2001	Belarus U21	16	(1)
2002–2011	Belarus	74	(1)

Managerial career
- 2018–2019: Dinamo Minsk (assistant)
- 2019–2020: Dinamo Minsk (assistant)
- 2021–2022: Energetik-BGU Minsk (assistant)
- 2022–2023: Energetik-BGU Minsk (reserves)
- 2023–2024: Energetik-BGU Minsk (assistant)
- 2024: Telavi (assistant)
- 2025: Chernomorets Novorossiysk (assistant)
- 2025–2026: Fakel Voronezh (assistant)
- * Club domestic league appearances and goals

Syarhey Pyatrovich Amelyanchuk (Belarusian: Сярге́й Пятро́віч Амельянчу́к, IPA: [sʲarˈɣʲɛj pʲaˈtrɔvʲit͡ʂ amʲɛlʲjanˈt͡ʂuk]; Russian: Серге́й Петро́вич Омельянчу́к, romanized: Sergéy Petróvich Omel'yanchúk, IPA: [sʲɪrˈɡʲej pʲɪˈtrovʲɪtɕ ɐmʲɪlʲjɪnʲˈtɕuk]; born 8 August 1980) is a Belarusian professional football manager and former player.

== International career ==
Amelyanchuk has been capped for national team regularly since 2002 and is currently the third most-capped player of the team behind Aliaksandr Kulchiy and Sergei Gurenko.

=== International goal ===
#	Date	Venue	Opponent	Score	Result	Competition
1	9 October 2004	Dinamo Stadium (Minsk), Belarus	Moldova	1 – 0	4–0	World Cup 2006 qualifier

== Honours ==
Legia Warsaw

- Ekstraklasa : 2001–02
- Polish League Cup: 2001–02

Lokomotiv Moscow

- Russian Super Cup: 2005
