= Hervé Zengue =

Footballer (born 1984)

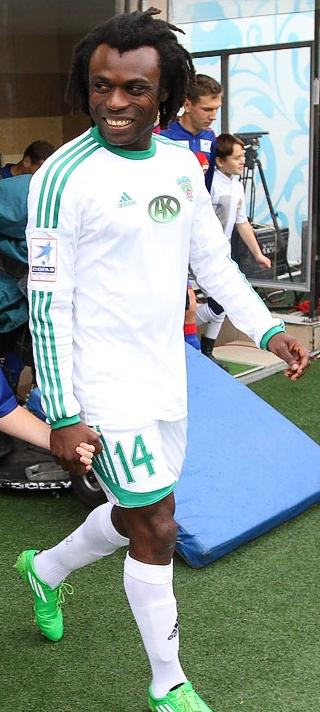
- Zengue with FC Terek Grozny in 2011

Personal information
- Full name: Hervé Xavier Zengue
- Date of birth: 22 January 1984 (age 42)
- Place of birth: Yaoundé, Cameroon
- Height: 1.75 m (5 ft 9 in)
- Position: Defender

Youth career
- 2001–2002: Fovu Baham

Senior career*
Years	Team	Apps	(Gls)
2003–2004	Coton Sport	–	(–)
2004–2006	Ankaragücü	43	(0)
2006–2007	Leixões	5	(0)
2007–2010	Viktoria Žižkov	67	(2)
2010–2012	Terek Grozny	30	(1)

International career
2011–2012	Burkina Faso	7	(0)
- * Club domestic league appearances and goals

Hervé Xavier Zengue (born 22 January 1984) is a former professional footballer. Born in Cameroon, he represented Burkina Faso at international level.

His participation in an Africa Cup of Nations qualifying game caused controversy in 2011. The Confederation of African Football's rejection of an appeal from the Namibian Football Association was the subject of an appeal to the Court of Arbitration for Sport (CAS) in December 2011. Namibia had initially appealed to the Confederation of African Football as Zengue was not eligible to play in international fixtures for Les Étalons, their appeal was rejected on a technicality. Namibia later appealed to the Court of Arbitration for Sport to have CAF's rejection overturned. The Court ruled in favour of the African Football Governing body.

Zengue's participation in a 2014 FIFA World Cup qualification game in June 2012 was investigated by FIFA who ruled him ineligible to represent Burkina Faso subject to appeal.

== International career ==
Zengue made his international début for Burkina Faso against Namibia in a 2012 Africa Cup of Nations qualification match on 26 March 2011.

He played in his first FIFA-organised game in June 2012 versus Congo.

=== Contested eligibility ===
On 4 June 2011, he played again for Burkina Faso against Namibia. Burkina Faso coach Paulo Duarte said that the player is eligible as he has a Burkinabé wife which entitles him to citizenship.

Namibian football officials formally complained about Zengue's participation because it was thought he was not eligible to represent Burkina Faso, as he did not meet the conditions set out in FIFA's statutes which would have enabled him to become eligible for the Burkina Faso national team. (Note: FIFA statutes on player eligibility: He was born on the territory of the relevant Association; His biological mother or biological father was born on the territory of the relevant Association; His grandmother or grandfather was born on the territory of the relevant Association; He has lived continuously for at least five years after reaching the age of 18 on the territory of the relevant Association.)

On 28 October, the day before the group stage draw for the 2012 Africa Cup of Nations, BBC reported that the player was ineligible and the player had not been granted clearance by FIFA. However, CAF chose to dismiss Namibia's complaint as it was not counter-signed by Burkina Faso's captain as per article 37.1 of CAF's statutes. Namibian FA unsuccessfully appealed the CAF decision. The NFA lodged a complaint with the Court of Arbitration for Sport to overturn CAF's decision to reject Zengue.

On 10 January 2012, CAS released a statement that said Namibia's appeal had been rejected. A press released by CAS stated that Zengue had taken residency in Burkina Faso in 1994, before receiving a Burkinabe nationality certificate in 2006 (whilst a player at Ankaragücü in Turkey) and a Burkinabe passport in March 2011 (the day before his début against Namibia). At no point did CAS decide whether or not Zengue was to be considered eligible for international football with Burkina Faso.

In December 2012, FIFA chose to punish Burkina Faso for fielding the ineligible Zengue in their World Cup qualifying game versus The Congo. Congo were awarded a 3–0 victory and 3 points.

== Career statistics ==
=== Club ===
Appearances and goals by club, season and competition
Club	Season	League			Cup		Continental		Total	
Club	Season	Division	Apps	Goals	Apps	Goals	Apps	Goals	Apps	Goals
Ankaragücü	2004–05	Süper Lig	27	0	1	0	—		27	0
Ankaragücü	2005–06	Süper Lig	16	0	3	0	—		16	0
Ankaragücü	Total		43	0	4	0	0	0	47	0
Leixões	2006–07	Segunda Liga	5	0			—		5	0
Viktoria Žižkov	2007–08	Gambrinus Liga	15	0			—		15	0
Viktoria Žižkov	2008–09	Gambrinus Liga	25	0			—		25	0
Viktoria Žižkov	2009–10	Czech 2. Liga	27	2			—		27	2
Viktoria Žižkov	Total		67	2			0	0	67	2
Terek Grozny	2010	Russian Premier League	5	0	0	0	—		5	0
Terek Grozny	2011–12	Russian Premier League	25	1	1	0	—		26	1
Terek Grozny	Total		30	1	1	0	0	0	31	1
Career total			145	2	5	0	0	0	150	3

=== International ===
Appearances and goals by national team and year
National team	Year	Apps	Goals
Burkina Faso	2011	5	0
Burkina Faso	2012	2	0
Total		7	0
