= Piotr Polczak =

Polish footballer (born 1986)

Personal information
- Full name: Piotr Pawel Polczak
- Date of birth: 25 August 1986 (age 40)
- Place of birth: Kraków, Poland
- Height: 1.92 m (6 ft 4 in)
- Position: Centre-back

Team information
- Current team: Zagłębie Sosnowiec (sporting director)

Senior career*
Years	Team	Apps	(Gls)
2004	MMKS Dąbrowa Górnicza		
2004–2008	GKS Katowice	74	(5)
2008–2010	Cracovia	77	(5)
2011–2013	Terek Grozny	15	(1)
2013	→ Volga Nizhny Novgorod (loan)	5	(0)
2013–2014	Volga Nizhny Novgorod	24	(2)
2015–2017	Cracovia	76	(4)
2017–2018	Astra Giurgiu	30	(1)
2018–2021	Zagłębie Sosnowiec	58	(2)

International career
2008–2009	Poland	5	(0)
- * Club domestic league appearances and goals

Piotr Pawel Polczak (born 25 August 1986) is a Polish former professional footballer who played as a central defender. He currently serves as the sporting director of Zagłębie Sosnowiec, a position he previously held from December 2022 to November 2023.

== Club career ==
In February 2011, Polczak joined Russian club Terek Grozny on a three-and-a-half-year contract.

On 3 July 2017, he signed a contract with Romanian side Astra Giurgiu.

== International career ==
Polczak made his first appearance for the Poland national team in a friendly against Ukraine on 20 August 2008.

== Career statistics ==
=== International ===
Appearances and goals by national team and year
National team	Year	Apps	Goals
Poland
Poland	2008	2	0
Poland	2009	3	0
Total		5	0
