= Stanislav Murikhin =

Russian footballer

Personal information
- Full name: Stanislav Igorevich Murikhin
- Date of birth: 21 January 1992 (age 34)
- Place of birth: St. Petersburg, Russia
- Height: 1.79 m (5 ft 10 in)
- Position: Forward

Youth career
- Zenit St. Petersburg

Senior career*
Years	Team	Apps	(Gls)
2009–2011	Zenit St. Petersburg	0	(0)
2012–2013	Terek Grozny	4	(0)
2014	Kalev Sillamäe	30	(16)
2015–2016	Volgar Astrakhan	14	(0)
2016	Belshina Bobruisk	9	(1)
2017–2018	Kyzyltash Bakhchisaray	8	(0)
- * Club domestic league appearances and goals

Stanislav Igorevich Murikhin (Russian: Станислав Игоревич Мурихин; born 21 January 1992) is a Russian former professional football player.

== Club career ==
He made his Russian Premier League debut for FC Terek Grozny on 1 April 2012 in a game against FC Amkar Perm.
