= Shamil Asildarov =

Russian footballer of Avar ethnicity

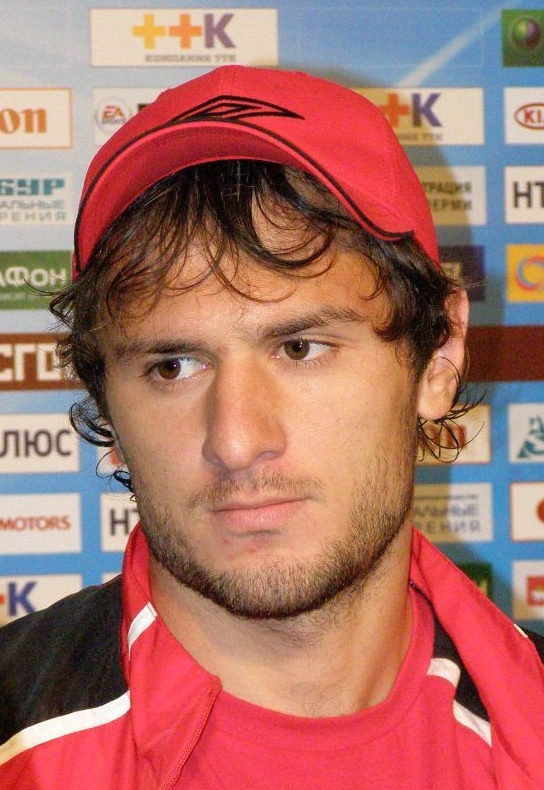

Personal information
- Full name: Shamil Saidbegovich Asildarov
- Date of birth: 18 May 1983 (age 43)
- Place of birth: Makhachkala, Dagestan ASSR, Russian SFSR, Soviet Union
- Height: 1.86 m (6 ft 1 in)
- Position: Striker

Senior career*
Years	Team	Apps	(Gls)
2000–2004	Dynamo Makhachkala	165	(93)
2005	Khimki	9	(4)
2006	Kuban Krasnodar	20	(18)
2006	Lokomotiv Moscow	4	(1)
2007	Kuban Krasnodar	13	(0)
2007	Terek Grozny	12	(4)
2008	Anzhi Makhachkala	21	(6)
2008	Luch-Energiya	9	(1)
2009	Spartak Nalchik	14	(8)
2010–2012	Terek Grozny	65	(17)
2012–2013	Volga Nizhny Novgorod	13	(3)
2014	Luch-Energiya	11	(5)
2014–2015	Anzhi Makhachkala	29	(5)
2016	Volgar Astrakhan	13	(5)
2016	Tobol	18	(2)
2017	Anzhi Makhachkala	6	(0)
2020–2021	Anzhi Makhachkala	8	(0)
- * Club domestic league appearances and goals

Shamil Saidbegovich Asildarov (Russian: Шамиль Саидбегович Асильдаров; born 18 May 1983) is a Russian former footballer of Avar ethnicity.

== Club career ==
Makhachkala-born Asildarov, is a journeyman striker who has played for eight different clubs in the last nine years.

On 2 July 2014, Asildarov signed a two-year contract with Anzhi Makhachkala. Leaving Anzhi after one season in June 2015.

In February 2016, Asildarov went on trial with Kazakhstan Premier League side FC Shakhter Karagandy.

On 13 June 2016, Asildarov signed a six-month contract with FC Tobol of the Kazakhstan Premier League.

On 16 February 2017, Asildarov returned to Anzhi for a third stint with the club. On 19 September 2020, Asildarov returned to Anzhi for a fourth stint on a contract until the end of the 2020–21 season.

== After football ==
On 9 January 2020, Anzhi Makhachkala announced Asildarov as their new vice president.

== Achievements ==
- Russian Premier League bronze: 2006
- Russian Second Division Zone South top scorer: 2003 (31 goals)
