= Marcin Komorowski =

Polish footballer (born 1984)

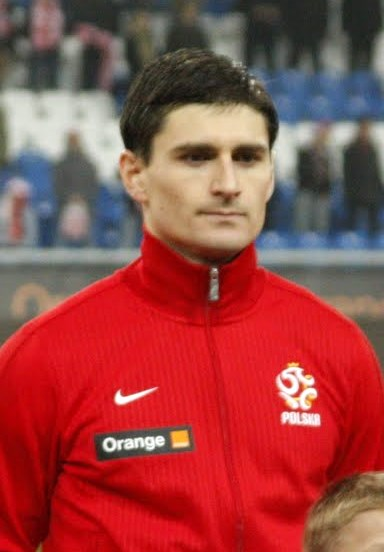

Personal information
- Date of birth: 17 April 1984 (age 42)
- Place of birth: Pabianice, Poland
- Height: 1.86 m (6 ft 1 in)
- Position: Defender

Senior career*
Years	Team	Apps	(Gls)
2002	PTC Pabianice		
2003	Piotrcovia Piotrków Trybunalski	3	(0)
2003–2005	Stal Głowno		
2005	Pelikan Łowicz		
2005	RKS Radomsko		
2005	Sokół Aleksandrów Łódzki		
2006–2007	GKS Bełchatów	2	(0)
2007	ŁKS Łódź	12	(1)
2008	Zagłębie Sosnowiec	11	(1)
2008	Polonia Bytom	14	(3)
2009–2012	Legia Warsaw	53	(1)
2012–2016	Terek Grozny	77	(5)

International career
2008–2015	Poland	13	(1)
- * Club domestic league appearances and goals

Marcin Komorowski (Polish pronunciation: [ˈmart͡ɕin ˌkɔmɔˈrɔfskʲi]; born 17 April 1984) is a Polish former professional footballer who played as a defender.

== Career ==
In June 2014, Komorowski signed a new two-year contract with Terek Grozny.

== International ==
He made his first appearance in the Poland national team in a friendly against Serbia on 14 December 2008.

=== International goals ===
#	Date	Venue	Opponent	Score	Result	Competition
1.	12 October 2012	National Stadium, Warsaw, Poland	South Africa	1–0	1–0	International Friendly

== Honours ==
Legia Warsaw

- Polish Cup: 2010–11, 2011–12
