= Ferreira (footballer, born 1984) =

Brazilian footballer

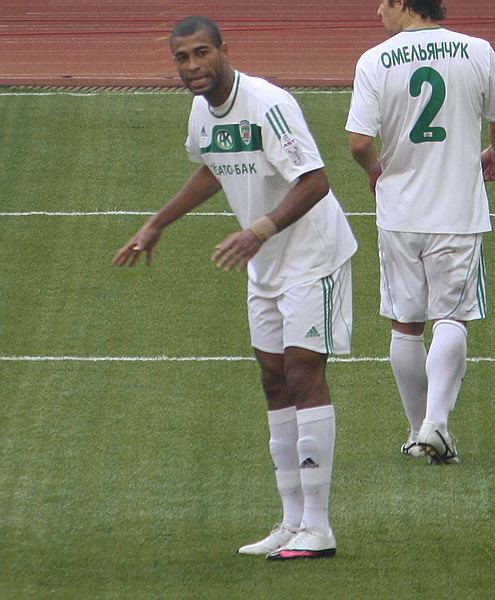

Personal information
- Full name: Antonio Ferreira de Oliveira Junior
- Date of birth: 24 October 1984 (age 42)
- Place of birth: Rio de Janeiro, Brazil
- Height: 1.92 m (6 ft 4 in)
- Position: Defender

Youth career
- Cabofriense

Senior career*
Years	Team	Apps	(Gls)
2002–2004	Cabofriense	22	(1)
2005–2006	FK Jūrmala	46	(7)
2007–2008	Liepājas Metalurgs	41	(5)
2009	Spartak Nalchik	13	(0)
2010–2014	Terek Grozny	100	(2)
2015	Bragantino	8	(0)
2015	Irtysh Pavlodar	5	(0)
2016	Mirassol	10	(1)
2016	Guarani	22	(3)
2017	Mirassol	1	(0)
2017	Figueirense	10	(0)
2018–2019	Guarani	34	(0)
2020–2021	São Bernardo	6	(0)
2021	Taubaté	9	(0)
2022	São Caetano	8	(0)
2022–2023	Cascavel	10	(0)
- * Club domestic league appearances and goals

Antonio Ferreira de Oliveira Junior (born 24 October 1984), often known as Ferreira, is a former football defender from Brazil.

== Career ==
Ferreira began his career at Rio de Janeiro club, Profute Futebol Clube in Brazil. In 2004, he moved to Latvia to play for FK Jūrmala where he scored seven goals in 46 appearances. He scored four goals in the 2006 season as the club finished in 6th place. On 6 April 2007 he signed for Virslīga champions Liepājas Metalurgs. On 19 July he scored for Metalurgs in their 1–1 home draw against FC Dinamo Brest from Belarus in the UEFA Cup

On 4 January 2010, Ferreira signed a three-year contract with FC Terek Grozny. Antonio left Terek Grozny five years later on 31 December 2014, when his contract with the club expired.

In July 2015, Ferreira signed for Kazakhstan Premier League side FC Irtysh Pavlodar.

In 2016, during a 2–0 loss against Boa Esporte Clube when he was playing for Guarani, Ferreira pushed the referee to the ground after he was sent off and some of his teammates wanted to calm him down. Ferreira pushed one of his teammates and then after the linesman guarded the referee, he still wanted to hurt the referee but later was removed from the pitch.

== Career statistics ==
As of match played 8 November 2015

Appearances and goals by club, season and competition
Club	Season	League			National Cup		Continental		Total	
Club	Season	Division	Apps	Goals	Apps	Goals	Apps	Goals	Apps	Goals
Spartak Nalchik	2009	Russian Premier League	13	0	1	0	–		14	0
Terek Grozny	2010	Russian Premier League	26	0	0	0	–		26	0
Terek Grozny	2011–12	Russian Premier League	36	1	2	0	–		38	1
Terek Grozny	2012–13	Russian Premier League	17	1	1	0	–		18	1
Terek Grozny	2013–14	Russian Premier League	19	0	0	0	–		19	0
Terek Grozny	2014–15	Russian Premier League	2	0	0	0	–		2	0
Terek Grozny	Total		100	2	4	0	-	-	104	2
Bragantino	2015	Campeonato Paulista	7	0	2	0	–		9	0
Irtysh Pavlodar	2015	Kazakhstan Premier League	5	0	0	0	–		5	0
Career total			125	2	6	0	-	-	131	2

== Honours ==
=== Club ===
Liepājas Metalurgs

- Baltic League (1): 2007
