= Igor Lebedenko =

Russian footballer

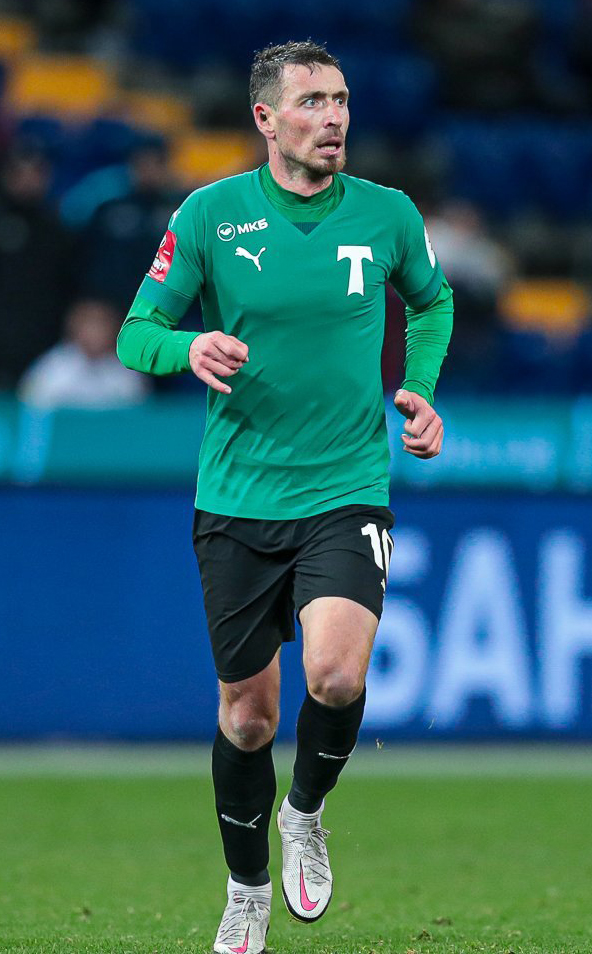
- Lebedenko with Torpedo Moscow in 2022

Personal information
- Full name: Igor Vladimirovich Lebedenko
- Date of birth: 27 May 1983 (age 43)
- Place of birth: Moscow, Soviet Union
- Height: 1.82 m (6 ft 0 in)
- Position: Striker

Youth career
- 1989–2000: Torpedo Moscow

Senior career*
Years	Team	Apps	(Gls)
2000–2004	Torpedo Moscow	73	(18)
2000	→ Torpedo-2	3	(0)
2005	Lokomotiv Moscow	23	(6)
2006–2008	Saturn Ramenskoye	57	(7)
2009–2010	Rostov	59	(7)
2011	Rubin Kazan	22	(2)
2012–2017	Terek Grozny	137	(20)
2017	Ararat Moscow	17	(5)
2018–2019	Fakel Voronezh	45	(17)
2019–2024	Torpedo Moscow	153	(27)
Total		589	(109)

International career
2002–2005	Russia U-21	21	(5)

Managerial career
- 2024–2025: Chernomorets Novorossiysk (assistant)
- 2025–2026: Fakel Voronezh (assistant)
- * Club domestic league appearances and goals

Igor Vladimirovich Lebedenko (Russian: Игорь Владимирович Лебеденко; born 27 May 1983) is a Russian football coach and a former forward.

== Career ==
=== Club ===
He played for FC Lokomotiv Moscow (2005–2006) before joining FC Saturn Moscow Oblast, before that he played at FC Torpedo Moscow (2002–2004), making his Russian Premier League debut for Torpedo on 17 March 2002 in a game against FC Dynamo Moscow. On 19 February 2009 the forward has left FC Rubin Kazan to join FC Rostov.

On 5 March 2023, Lebedenko scored an equalizer for FC Torpedo Moscow in a 2–2 draw against FC Krasnodar and became the oldest goal scorer in the history of the Russian Premier League at the age of 39 years, 9 months and 6 days.

On 27 May 2023 (his 40th birthday), Lebedenko extended his contract with Torpedo until June 2025.

=== International ===
Igor has been called up to the Russia national football team but has not played. He has played for the Russia U-21.

== Honours ==
Rubin Kazan

- Russian Cup : 2012

Torpedo Moscow

- Russian Football National League : 2021-22

== Career statistics ==
=== Club ===
As of match played 4 September 2023

Appearances and goals by club, season and competition
Club	Season	League			Cup		Continental		Other		Total	
Club	Season	Division	Apps	Goals	Apps	Goals	Apps	Goals	Apps	Goals	Apps	Goals
Torpedo-2 Moscow	2000	Russian Professional Football League	3	0	0	0	–		–		3	0
Torpedo Moscow	2000	Russian Premier League	0	0	0	0	0	0	–		0	0
Torpedo Moscow	2001	Russian Premier League	0	0	0	0	0	0	–		0	0
Torpedo Moscow	2002	Russian Premier League	21	6	1	0	–		–		22	6
Torpedo Moscow	2003	Russian Premier League	29	3	2	0	5	0	4 (Note: Four appearances in the Russian Premier League Cup)	0	40	3
Torpedo Moscow	2004	Russian Premier League	23	9	2	0	–		–		25	9
Torpedo Moscow	Total		73	18	5	0	5	0	4	0	87	18
Lokomotiv Moscow	2005	Russian Premier League	23	6	1	1	10	4	–		34	11
Lokomotiv Moscow	2006	Russian Premier League	0	0	0	0	2	0	–		2	0
Lokomotiv Moscow	Total		23	6	1	1	12	4	0	0	36	11
Saturn Ramenskoye	2006	Russian Premier League	21	5	1	0	–		–		22	5
Saturn Ramenskoye	2007	Russian Premier League	26	2	4	0	–		–		30	2
Saturn Ramenskoye	2008	Russian Premier League	10	0	0	0	0	0	–		10	0
Saturn Ramenskoye	Total		57	7	5	0	0	0	0	0	62	7
Rostov	2009	Russian Premier League	29	3	1	0	–		–		30	3
Rostov	2010	Russian Premier League	30	3	2	1	–		–		32	4
Rostov	Total		59	6	3	1	0	0	0	0	62	7
Rubin Kazan	2011–12	Russian Premier League	22	2	1	1	5	0	–		28	3
Terek Grozny	2011–12	Russian Premier League	12	2	1	0	–		–		13	2
Terek Grozny	2012–13	Russian Premier League	27	6	3	0	–		–		30	6
Terek Grozny	2013–14	Russian Premier League	27	3	3	0	–		–		30	3
Terek Grozny	2014–15	Russian Premier League	29	4	1	0	–		–		30	4
Terek Grozny	2015–16	Russian Premier League	25	2	1	0	–		–		26	2
Terek Grozny	2016–17	Russian Premier League	17	3	1	1	–		–		18	4
Terek Grozny	Total		137	20	10	1	0	0	0	0	147	21
Ararat Moscow	2017–18	Russian Professional Football League	17	5	3	0	–		–		20	5
Fakel Voronezh	2017–18	Russian Football National League	12	3	–		–		–		12	3
Fakel Voronezh	2018–19	Russian Football National League	33	14	–		–		–		33	14
Fakel Voronezh	Total		45	17	0	0	0	0	0	0	45	17
Torpedo Moscow	2019–20	Russian Football National League	27	6	4	0	–		–		31	6
Torpedo Moscow	2020–21	Russian Football National League	36	10	1	0	–		–		37	10
Torpedo Moscow	2021–22	Russian Football National League	38	8	1	0	–		–		39	8
Torpedo Moscow	2022–23	Russian Premier League	23	2	4	1	–		–		27	3
Torpedo Moscow	2023–24	Russian First League	8	1	0	0	–		–		8	1
Torpedo Moscow	Total		132	27	10	1	0	0	0	0	142	28
Career total			568	108	38	5	22	4	4	0	632	117
