= Musawengosi Mguni =

Zimbabwean footballer (born 1983)

Musa Mguni
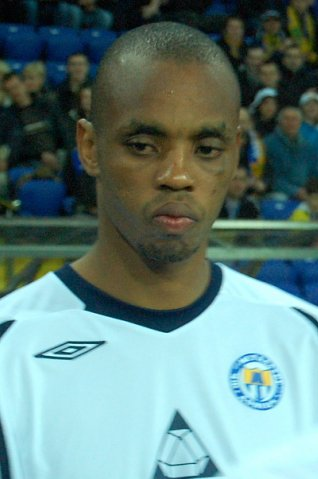

Personal information
- Full name: Musawengosi Mguni
- Date of birth: 8 April 1983 (age 43)
- Place of birth: Bulawayo, Zimbabwe
- Height: 1.96 m (6 ft 5 in)
- Position: Striker

Senior career*
Years	Team	Apps	(Gls)
2001–2003	Motor Action	22	(5)
2003–2004	Hellenic	4	(0)
2004	Orlando Pirates	1	(0)
2005–2008	AC Omonia	66	(28)
2008–2009	Al Shabab	14	(8)
2009–2010	Metalurh Donetsk	33	(10)
2011–2012	Terek Grozny	20	(2)
2013–2014	Metalurh Donetsk	1	(0)
2014–2015	Ayia Napa	26	(1)
2016	Olympiakos Nicosia	8	(9)
2016	Ayia Napa	13	(0)
2017	Omonia Aradippou	10	(1)
2017	Karmiotissa	10	(4)
2018	Chalkanoras Idaliou	10	(2)

International career
2002–2012	Zimbabwe	75	(48)
- * Club domestic league appearances and goals

Musawengosi Mguni (born 8 April 1983) is a Zimbabwean former football player.

== Career ==
=== Club ===
In June 2008, Mguni moved to Al Shabab, for zero fee as free transfer. One year later Mguni signed for Metalurh Donetsk.

In February 2011, Mguni signed with Russian side Terek Grozny. After being released by Terek, Mguni re-signed for Metalurh Donetsk in the summer of 2013, before being released by the club, having played only one game, in January 2014.

== Career statistics ==
=== Club ===
Club statistics
Season	Club	League	League		Cup		Continental		Total	
Season	Club	League	App	Goals	App	Goals	App	Goals	App	Goals
2001	Motor Action	Zimbabwe Premier Soccer League	2	0			—		2	0
2002	Motor Action	Zimbabwe Premier Soccer League	10	2			—		10	2
2003	Motor Action	Zimbabwe Premier Soccer League	10	3			—		10	3
2003–04	Hellenic	Premier Soccer League	4	0			—		4	0
2004–05	Orlando Pirates	Premier Soccer League	1	0			—		1	0
2004–05	AC Omonia	Cypriot First Division	9	6			—		9	6
2005–06	AC Omonia	Cypriot First Division	16	7			—		16	7
2006–07	AC Omonia	Cypriot First Division	24	9			4	2	24	9
2007–08	AC Omonia	Cypriot First Division	17	6			—		17	6
2008–09	Al Shabab	UAE Arabian Gulf League		3			6	2	6	5
2009–10	Metalurh Donetsk	Ukrainian Premier League	20	6	2	0	4	3	26	9
2010–11	Metalurh Donetsk	Ukrainian Premier League	12	4	0	0	—		12	4
2011–12	Terek Grozny	Russian Premier League	20	2	1	1	—		21	3
2012–13	Terek Grozny	Russian Premier League	0	0	0	0	—		0	0
2013–14	Metalurh Donetsk	Ukrainian Premier League	1	0	0	0	—		1	0
Total	Zimbabwe		22	5			—		22	5
Total	South Africa		5	0			—		5	0
Total	Cyprus		66	27			4	2	66	27
Total	UAE		16	3			6	2	22	5
Total	Ukraine		33	10	2	0	4	3	39	13
Total	Russia		20	2	1	1	—		23	3
Career total			146	48	3	1	14	7	159	54

=== International ===
Zimbabwe national team
Year	Apps	Goals
2002	1	2
2004	3	0
2012	1	0
Total	5	2

Statistics accurate as of match played 29 February 2024
