= 2007 FC Terek Grozny season =

Terek Grozny
2007 season
- Manager: Vait Talgayev
- Stadium: Central Stadium
- First Division: 2nd
- Russian Cup: Round of 16 vs Amkar Perm
- Top goalscorer: League: Denis Zubko (8); All: Two Players (9)
Home colours	Away colours

The 2007 Terek Grozny season was the second season that the club played back in the Russian Football National League following their relegation from the Russian Premier League at the end of the 2005 Season.

== Squad ==
As of match played 5 November 2007

No.	Name	Nationality	Position	Date of birth (age)	Signed from	Signed in	Contract ends	Apps.	Goals
Goalkeepers
1	Sergei Stepanenko	(Kazakhstan)	GK	25 January 1981 (aged 26)	Taraz	2007			
16	Maksym Levytskyi	(Ukraine)	GK	26 November 1972 (aged 34)	Sibir Novosibirsk	2007			
35	Rizavdi Edilov	(Russia)	GK	26 June 1988 (aged 19)	Youth Team	2005		4	0
Defenders
3	Ismail Ediyev	(Russia)	DF	16 February 1988 (aged 19)	Youth Team	2005		6	0
3	Anatoli Romanovich	(Russia)	DF	9 September 1979 (aged 28)	Shinnik Yaroslavl	2007			
18	Timur Dzhabrailov	(Russia)	DF	5 August 1973 (aged 34)	Angusht Nazran	2001			
23	Damir Memišević	(Bosnia and Herzegovina)	DF	22 January 1984 (aged 23)	Željezničar Sarajevo	2007			
24	Sergei Kurdyukov	(Russia)	DF	3 September 1982 (aged 25)	Spartak Tambov	2006		16	0
25	Yevgeni Varlamov	(Russia)	DF	25 July 1975 (aged 32)	KAMAZ	2006		18	2
40	Ion Testemițanu	(Moldova)	DF	27 April 1974 (aged 33)	Sibir Novosibirsk	2007			
99	Jerry-Christian Tchuissé	(Cameroon)	DF	13 January 1975 (aged 32)	Moscow	2007			
Midfielders
2	Murad Ramazanov	(Russia)	MF	10 March 1979 (aged 28)	Kryvbas Kryvyi Rih	2006		34	0
5	Albert Sarkisyan	(Armenia)	MF	15 May 1975 (aged 32)	Amkar Perm	2007			
6	Wýaçeslaw Krendelew	(Turkmenistan)	MF	24 July 1982 (aged 25)	Taraz	2007			
7	Taras Shelest	(Russia)	MF	3 February 1980 (aged 27)	Oryol	2006		16	0
8	Atanas Bornosuzov	(Bulgaria)	MF	5 October 1979 (aged 28)	Levski Sofia	2007			
17	Vladislav Kulik	(Russia)	MF	27 February 1985 (aged 22)	Ural Yekaterinburg	2006		40	3
21	Gamlet Siukayev	(Russia)	MF	9 March 1981 (aged 26)	Volgar-Gazprom Astrakhan	2007			
77	Dejan Martinović	(Bosnia and Herzegovina)	DF	19 July 1983 (aged 24)	Žepče	2007			
Forwards
9	Andrei Fedkov	(Russia)	FW	4 July 1971 (aged 36)	SKA Rostov-on-Don	2007			
10	Magomed Adiyev	(Russia)	FW	30 June 1977 (aged 30)	Kryvbas Kryvyi Rih	2006		30	4
11	Shamil Lakhiyalov	(Russia)	FW	28 October 1979 (aged 28)	Anzhi Makhachkala	2007			
11	Andrey Movsisyan	(Armenia)	FW	27 October 1975 (aged 32)	Luch-Energiya Vladivostok	2007			
20	Denis Zubko	(Russia)	FW	7 November 1974 (aged 32)	Ural Yekaterinburg	2007			
22	Zaur Sadayev	(Russia)	FW	6 November 1989 (aged 17)	Youth Team	2006		3	0
22	Jean Bouli	(Cameroon)	FW	4 September 1980 (aged 27)	Dynamo Bryansk	2007			
29	Islam Tsuroyev	(Russia)	FW	23 April 1989 (aged 18)	Angusht Nazran	2007			
33	Shamil Asildarov	(Russia)	FW	18 May 1983 (aged 24)	Kuban Krasnodar	2007			
Away on loan
39	Adlan Katsayev	(Russia)	MF	20 February 1988 (aged 19)	Youth Team	2005		13	0
40	Rizvan Utsiyev	(Russia)	DF	7 February 1988 (aged 19)	Youth Team	2005		8	0
Players that left Terek Grozny during the season
32	Nazhaddi Ibragimov	(Russia)	MF	25 July 1987 (aged 20)	Youth Team	2006		4	0

=== On loan ===
Note: Flags indicate national team as defined under FIFA eligibility rules; some limited exceptions apply. Players may hold more than one non-FIFA nationality.

No. / Pos. / Nation / Player; 39 / MF / RUS / Adlan Katsayev (at Kavkaztransgaz-2005 Ryzdvyany)	No. / Pos. / Nation / Player; 40 / DF / RUS / Rizvan Utsiyev (at Kavkaztransgaz-2005 Ryzdvyany)

=== Left club during season ===
Note: Flags indicate national team as defined under FIFA eligibility rules; some limited exceptions apply. Players may hold more than one non-FIFA nationality.

No.	Pos.	Nation	Player
32	MF	RUS	Nazhaddi Ibragimov (to Smolensk)

== Transfers ==
=== In ===
Date	Position	Nationality	Name	From	Fee	Ref.
Winter 2007	GK	(Kazakhstan)	Sergei Stepanenko	Taraz	Undisclosed	
Winter 2007	GK	(Ukraine)	Maksym Levytskyi	Sibir Novosibirsk	Undisclosed	
Winter 2007	DF	(Cameroon)	Jerry-Christian Tchuissé	Moscow	Undisclosed	
Winter 2007	DF	(Moldova)	Ion Testemițanu	Sibir Novosibirsk	Undisclosed	
Winter 2007	MF	(Armenia)	Albert Sarkisyan	Amkar Perm	Undisclosed	
Winter 2007	MF	(Bulgaria)	Atanas Bornosuzov	Levski Sofia	Undisclosed	
Winter 2007	MF	(Russia)	Gamlet Siukayev	Volgar-Gazprom Astrakhan	Undisclosed	
Winter 2007	MF	(Turkmenistan)	Wýaçeslaw Krendelew	Taraz	Undisclosed	
Winter 2007	FW	(Armenia)	Andrey Movsisyan	Luch-Energiya Vladivostok	Undisclosed	
Winter 2007	FW	(Russia)	Andrei Fedkov	SKA Rostov-on-Don	Undisclosed	
Winter 2007	FW	(Russia)	Islam Tsuroyev	Angusht Nazran	Undisclosed	
Winter 2007	FW	(Russia)	Denis Zubko	Ural Yekaterinburg	Undisclosed	
Summer 2007	DF	(Bosnia and Herzegovina)	Damir Memišević	Željezničar Sarajevo	Undisclosed	
Summer 2007	DF	(Russia)	Anatoli Romanovich	Shinnik Yaroslavl	Undisclosed	
Summer 2007	MF	(Cameroon)	Jean Bouli	Dynamo Bryansk	Undisclosed	
Summer 2007	FW	(Russia)	Shamil Asildarov	Kuban Krasnodar	Undisclosed	
Summer 2007	FW	(Russia)	Shamil Lakhiyalov	Anzhi Makhachkala	Undisclosed	

=== Out ===
Date	Position	Nationality	Name	To	Fee	Ref.
Winter 2007	GK	(Azerbaijan)	Dmitry Kramarenko	Khazar Lankaran	Undislcosed	
Winter 2007	DF	(Brazil)	Éder	Sertãozinho	Undislcosed	
Winter 2007	DF	(Slovenia)	Jalen Pokorn	Atlantas Klaipėda	Undislcosed	
Winter 2007	DF	(Russia)	Roman Sharonov	Shinnik Yaroslavl	Undislcosed	
Winter 2007	DF	(Russia)	Oleg Kornaukhov	Torpedo Moscow	Undislcosed	
Winter 2007	MF	(Azerbaijan)	Narvik Sırxayev	Anzhi Makhachkala	Undislcosed	
Winter 2007	MF	(Russia)	Eduard Kobozev	SOYUZ-Gazprom Izhevsk	Undislcosed	
Winter 2007	MF	(Brazil)	Alex	Marília	Undislcosed	
Winter 2007	MF	(Belarus)	Uladzimir Karytska	Chornomorets Odesa	Undislcosed	
Winter 2007	MF	(Russia)	Yevgeni Ivanov	Novokuznetsk	Undislcosed	
Winter 2007	FW	(Russia)	Budun Budunov	Anzhi Makhachkala	Undislcosed	
Winter 2007	FW	(Russia)	Maksim Aristarkhov	Zorya Luhansk	Undislcosed	
Summer 2007	MF	(Russia)	Nazhaddi Ibragimov	Smolensk	Undislcosed	

=== Loans out ===
Date from	Position	Nationality	Name	To	Date to	Ref.
Summer 2007	DF	(Russia)	Rizvan Utsiyev	Kavkaztransgaz-2005 Ryzdvyany	End of Season	
Summer 2007	MF	(Russia)	Adlan Katsayev	Kavkaztransgaz-2005 Ryzdvyany	End of Season	

=== Released ===
Date	Position	Nationality	Name	Joined	Date
Winter 2007	GK	(Russia)	Dmitri Goncharov	Retired	
Winter 2007	DF	(Russia)	Andrei Malay	Retired	
Winter 2007	MF	(Russia)	Vladimir Leonchenko	Retired	
Winter 2007	MF	(Russia)	Musa Mazayev	Druzhba Maykop	2008
Winter 2007	FW	(Cameroon)	Mvondo Atangana	Retired	
Winter 2007	FW	(Russia)	Rizvan Sadayev	Kavkaztransgaz-2005 Ryzdvyany	2008

== Competitions ==
=== First Division ===
==== Results by round ====
Round	1	2	3	4	5	6	7	8	9	10	11	12	13	14	15	16	17	18	19	20	21	22	23	24	25	26	27	28	29	30	31	32	33	34	35	36	37	38	39	40	41	42
Ground	A	A	H	H	A	A	H	H	A	A	H	H	A	A	H	H	H	A	A	H	H	A	A	H	H	A	A	H	H	A	A	H	H	A	A	A	H	H	A	A	H	H
Result	L	W	L	W	D	W	W	W	D	W	D	W	W	L	W	W	D	W	W	W	W	D	W	L	W	D	W	W	W	L	L	W	W	W	W	L	W	W	L	W	W	W

Updated to match(es) played on 5 November 2007. Source: See Results
A = Away; H = Home; W = Win; D = Draw; L = Loss

==== Results ====
28 March 2007 1	Nosta Novotroitsk	2 – 0	Terek Grozny	Moscow
18:00 MSK (UTC+3)	Nizamutdinov 23', 50'; Surodin (yellow card) 26' (yellow-red card) 86'; Yemelyanov (yellow card) 53'	Report	Varlamov (yellow card) 49'	Stadium: Luzhniki Stadium; Attendance: 200; Referee: Sergey Andreev

31 March 2007 2	Sodovik Sterlitamak	0 – 2	Terek Grozny	Sterlitamak
16:00 MSK (UTC+3)	Ponomaryov (yellow card) 21'; Novikov (yellow card) 43'; Tuzovskiy (yellow card) 59'	Report	Adiyev 10' (pen.), 13' (pen.); Siukayev (yellow card) 25'; Ramazanov (yellow card) 40'; Movsisyan (red card) 45'; Varlamov (yellow card) 89'	Stadium: Sodovik Stadium; Attendance: 5,000; Referee: Marat Galimov

7 April 2007 3	Terek Grozny	0 – 1	Shinnik Yaroslavl	Pyatigorsk
17:00 MSK (UTC+3)	Shelestv (yellow card) 19'; Dzhabrailov (yellow card) 40'	Report	Skvortsov (yellow card) 43'; Kazakov (yellow card) 54'; Poroshyn 55'; Cherkes (yellow card) 87'	Stadium: Central Stadium; Attendance: 2,000; Referee: Yuri Kunitsa

10 April 2007 4	Terek Grozny	1 – 0	Tekstilshchik Ivanovo	Pyatigorsk
17:00 MSK (UTC+3)	Sarkisyan (yellow card) 16'; Bornosuzov (yellow card) 72'; Dzhabrailov 78'; Tsuroyev (yellow card) 90'	Report	Romanov (yellow card) 62'; Alemanov (yellow card) 63'	Stadium: Central Stadium; Attendance: 1,200; Referee: Radik Akhmadullin

17 April 2007 5	Alania Vladikavkaz	0 – 0	Terek Grozny	Vladikavkaz
17:30 MSK (UTC+3)	Kasaev (yellow card) 28'; Xavier (yellow card) 79' (yellow-red card) 84'	Report	Ramazanov (yellow card) 46'; Varlamov (yellow card) 77'; Sarkisyan (yellow card) 81'	Stadium: Republican Spartak Stadium; Attendance: 9,500; Referee: Oleg Kuzmenko

20 April 2007 6	Mashuk-KMV	0 – 2	Terek Grozny	Pyatigorsk
18:00 MSK (UTC+3)	Udodov (yellow card) 31'	Report	Ramazanov (yellow card) 3' (goal) 86' (pen.); Dzhabrailov (yellow card) 23'; Varlamov 78'	Stadium: Central Stadium; Attendance: 3,300; Referee: Vladislav Bezborodov

27 April 2007 7	Terek Grozny	2 – 0	Dynamo Bryansk	Pyatigorsk
17:00 MSK (UTC+3)	Zubko 8'; Ramazanov 32' (pen.); Testemițanu (yellow card) 41'; Dzhabrailov (yellow card) 54'	Report	Jincharadze (yellow card) 26'; V.Baidakov (yellow card) 35'; P.Kutas (yellow card) 47'	Stadium: Central Stadium; Attendance: 1,500; Referee: Georgiy Maramygin

30 April 2007 8	Terek Grozny	4 – 2	Avangard Kursk	Pyatigorsk
17:00 MSK (UTC+3)	Varlamov 3'; Dzhabrailov (yellow card) 10'; Krendelew 40'; Movsisyan 52'; Fedkov 90'	Report	Gershun 8'; Voronkin (yellow card) 18'; Kolomiychenko (yellow card) 42'; Nekrasov (yellow card) 54'; Tishchenko (yellow card) 66'; Korovushkin 85'	Stadium: Central Stadium; Attendance: 1,000; Referee: Vitali Doroshenko

7 May 2007 9	SKA Rostov-on-Don	0 – 0	Terek Grozny	Rostov-on-Don
18:00 MSK (UTC+3)	Stefanović (yellow card) 38'	Report		Stadium: SKA SKVO Stadium; Attendance: 5,500; Referee: Alexey Reznikov

10 May 2007 10	Salyut Belgorod	0 – 1	Terek Grozny	Belgorod
18:30 MSK (UTC+3)	Butyrin (yellow card) 58'	Report	Memišević 40'; Zubko (yellow card) 89'	Stadium: Energomash Stadium; Attendance: 8,000; Referee: Dmitry Popov

17 May 2007 11	Terek Grozny	0 – 0	SKA-Khabarovsk	Pyatigorsk
17:00 MSK (UTC+3)	Bornosuzov (yellow card) 74'	Report	Sukhoverkhov (yellow card) 29'; Karmazinenko (yellow card) 44'; Dimidko (yellow card) 47'; Nikiforov (yellow card) 83'	Stadium: Central Stadium; Attendance: 1,500; Referee: Alexei Kovalev

20 May 2007 12	Terek Grozny	1 – 0	Zvezda Irkutsk	Pyatigorsk
17:30 MSK (UTC+3)	Ramazanov (yellow card) 45'; Adiyev 48'; Siukayev (yellow card) 51'; Dzhabrailov (yellow card) 76'; Sarkisyan (yellow card) 82'	Report	Zhilyayev (yellow card) 65'	Stadium: Central Stadium; Attendance: 1,200; Referee: Dmitry Bereznev

27 May 2007 13	Metallurg-Kuzbass	0 – 3	Terek Grozny	Novokuznetsk
14:00 MSK (UTC+3)	Nedorezov (yellow card) 58'; Kharitonov (red card) 65'; Kildishev (yellow card) 73'	Report	Adiyev 4' (yellow card) 24'; Bornosuzov (yellow card) 61'; Memišević 63'; Krendelew (yellow card) 64'; Zubko 77'	Stadium: Metallurg Stadium; Attendance: 1,500; Referee: Georgy Maramygin

30 May 2007 14	Sibir Novosibirsk	1 – 0	Terek Grozny	Novosibirsk
16:00 MSK (UTC+3)	Akimov (yellow card) 42' (goal) 51'; Martins (yellow card) 88'	Report	Levytskyi (yellow card) 31'; Siukayev (yellow card) 88'	Stadium: Spartak Stadium; Attendance: 6,000; Referee: Sergey Matsyura

6 June 2007 15	Terek Grozny	2 – 0	Anzhi Makhachkala	Pyatigorsk
18:00 MSK (UTC+3)	Bornosuzov 26' (yellow card) 28'; Adiyev 54'; Varlamov (yellow card) 59'; Ramazanov (yellow card) 71'; Siukayev (yellow card) 78'	Report	Mzhavanadze (yellow card) 25'; Kébé (yellow card) 51'; Zoa (yellow card) 53'	Stadium: Central Stadium; Attendance: 2,500; Referee: Marat Galimov

17 June 2007 16	Terek Grozny	3 – 0	Spartak-MZhK Ryazan	Pyatigorsk
18:00 MSK (UTC+3)	Kulik 3'; Abramov 24' (o.g.); Katsayev 89' (pen.)	Report		Stadium: Central Stadium; Attendance: 1,200; Referee: Vladislav Bezborodov

20 June 2007 17	Terek Grozny	1 – 1	Ural Yekaterinburg	Pyatigorsk
18:00 MSK (UTC+3)	Sarkisyan (yellow card) 50'; Zubko 71'; Adiyev (yellow card) 89'; Varlamov (yellow card) 90'	Report	Alkhimov 50' (pen.); Oyewole (yellow card) 41'; Radkevich (yellow card) 64'; Shkabara (yellow card) 83'; Mysin (yellow card) 90'	Stadium: Central Stadium; Attendance: 1,200; Referee: Oleg Kuzmenko

30 June 2007 18	Torpedo Moscow	1 – 2	Terek Grozny	Moscow
14:00 MSK (UTC+3)	Borodin (red card) 21'; Evseev 29' (yellow card) 56'; Kolesnikov (yellow card) 45' (yellow-red card) 67'; Jokić (yellow card) 61'	Report	Varlamov (yellow card) 42'; Ramazanov 51' (pen.), 61' (pen.); Tchuissé (yellow card) 70'; Dzhabrailov (yellow card) 80'	Stadium: Luzhniki Stadium; Attendance: 3,500; Referee: Radik Akhmadullin

3 July 2007 19	Baltika Kaliningrad	0 – 1	Terek Grozny	Kaliningrad
20:00 MSK (UTC+3)	Timofeyev (yellow card) 6'; Bondarenko (yellow card) 63'	Report	Varlamov (yellow card) 21' (goal) 89'	Stadium: Baltika Stadium; Attendance: 1,500; Referee: Ildus Biglov

7 July 2007 20	Terek Grozny	2 – 1	KAMAZ	Pyatigorsk
18:00 MSK (UTC+3)	Krendelew 1' (yellow card) 89'; Kulik 70'; Memišević (yellow card) 84'	Report	Oganyan 29'; Demenko (yellow card) 59'; Tsorayev (yellow card) 61'; Petrović (yellow card) 64'; Todorović (yellow card) 79'	Stadium: Central Stadium; Attendance: 1,500; Referee: Vitali Doroshenko

10 July 2007 21	Terek Grozny	2 – 0	Mordovia Saransk	Pyatigorsk
18:00 MSK (UTC+3)	Kulik (yellow card) 3' (goal) 32'; Dzhabrailov 53'; Bornosuzov (yellow card) 83'	Report		Stadium: Central Stadium; Attendance: 1,500; Referee: Alexey Yeskov

24 July 2007 22	Shinnik Yaroslavl	1 – 1	Terek Grozny	Yaroslavl
19:00 MSK (UTC+3)	Monaryov 27' (pen.) (yellow card) 62'; Kazakov (yellow card) 73'; Skvortsov (yellow card) 82'; Cherkes (yellow card) 84'; Khazov (yellow card) 90'	Report	Adiyev 10'; Varlamov (yellow card) 26'; Kulik (yellow card) 82'; Bornosuzov (yellow card) 87'; Levytskyi (yellow card) 90'	Stadium: Shinnik Stadium; Attendance: 12,000; Referee: Sergey Timofeev

27 July 2007 23	Tekstilshchik Ivanovo	0 – 1	Terek Grozny	Ivanovo
18:30 MSK (UTC+3)		Report	Memišević (yellow card) 36'; Ramazanov 83' (pen.)	Stadium: Tekstilshchik Stadium; Attendance: 6,000; Referee: Dmitry Popov

2 August 2007 24	Terek Grozny	0 – 2	Alania Vladikavkaz	Pyatigorsk
18:00 MSK (UTC+3)	Ramazanov (yellow card) 41' (penalty missed) 69'; Varlamov (yellow card) 52'	Report	Dubrovin 10'; Bestayev (yellow card) 27'; Kardek (yellow card) 48'; Bazayev 66'	Stadium: Central Stadium; Attendance: 2,600; Referee: Vladimir Rogulev

5 August 2007 25	Terek Grozny	2 – 1	Mashuk-KMV	Pyatigorsk
18:00 MSK (UTC+3)	Fedkov 17', 26' (pen.)	Report	Sylka (yellow card) 8'; Udodov 55'	Stadium: Central Stadium; Attendance: 2,700; Referee: Maksim Layushkin

13 August 2007 26	Dynamo Bryansk	2 – 2	Terek Grozny	Bryansk
18:00 MSK (UTC+3)	Shelyutov 32'; Filippenkov 77'; Gusak (yellow card) 90'	Report	Zubko 18'; Bornosuzov (yellow card) 30'; Kulik 65'; Shelest (yellow card) 70'	Stadium: Dynamo Stadium; Attendance: 7,000; Referee: Marat Galimov

16 August 2007 27	Avangard Kursk	0 – 1	Terek Grozny	Kursk
18:00 MSK (UTC+3)	Tonkikh (yellow card) 43'; Voronkin (yellow card) 89'	Report	Kulik 21'; Varlamov (yellow card) 33'; Ramazanov (yellow card) 39'; Dzhabrailov (yellow card) 76'	Stadium: Trudovye Rezervy Stadium; Attendance: 5,500; Referee: Georgy Maramygin

23 August 2007 28	Terek Grozny	3 – 0	SKA Rostov-on-Don	Pyatigorsk
17:30 MSK (UTC+3)	Zubko 4'; Kulik (yellow card) 68'; Dzhabrailov 77'; Lakhiyalov 84'	Report	Kalashnikov (yellow card) 26'; Kenkishvili (yellow card) 38'; Shkurat (yellow card) 80'; Shirshov (yellow card) 82'	Stadium: Central Stadium; Attendance: 1,500; Referee: Alexander Evstigneev

26 August 2007 29	Terek Grozny	1 – 0	Salyut Belgorod	Pyatigorsk
17:30 MSK (UTC+3)	Kulik 45'	Report	Butyrin (yellow card) 38'	Stadium: Central Stadium; Attendance: 2,000; Referee: Alexey Reznikov

2 September 2007 30	SKA-Khabarovsk	2 – 1	Terek Grozny	Khabarovsk
12:00 MSK (UTC+3)	Sukhoverkhov 16'; Yarkin 81'; Nevokshonov (yellow card) 90+2'	Report	Ramazanov (yellow card) 32'; Dzhabrailov 90+1'; Bouli (yellow card) 90+1'	Stadium: Lenin Stadium; Attendance: 7,000; Referee: Sergei Karasev

5 September 2007 31	Zvezda Irkutsk	2 – 0	Terek Grozny	Irkutsk
13:00 MSK (UTC+3)	Razin (yellow card) 19'; Salnikov 24', 46'	Report	Asildarov (yellow card) 14'	Stadium: Trud Stadium; Attendance: 3,200; Referee: Vitali Doroshenko

12 September 2007 32	Terek Grozny	3 – 1	Metallurg-Kuzbass	Pyatigorsk
17:00 MSK (UTC+3)	Ramazanov (yellow card) 30'; Lakhiyalov 37'; Krendelew 40'; Romanovich 57'; Kurdyukov (yellow card) 89'	Report	Cleșcenco 70'	Stadium: Central Stadium; Attendance: 2,000; Referee: Eduard Malyi

15 September 2007 33	Terek Grozny	2 – 0	Sibir Novosibirsk	Pyatigorsk
17:00 MSK (UTC+3)	Bornosuzov (yellow card) 49'; Romanovich 60'; Dzhabrailov (yellow card) 62'; Zubko 64' (yellow card) 80'; Kulik (yellow card) 88'	Report	Olenikov (yellow card) 5'; Akimov (yellow card) 32'; Chizhov (yellow card) 61'	Stadium: Central Stadium; Attendance: 2,900; Referee: Maksim Layushkin

23 September 2007 34	Anzhi Makhachkala	1 – 3	Terek Grozny	Makhachkala
16:00 MSK (UTC+3)	Hüseynov 29'; Arziani (yellow card) 59'; Khojava (yellow card) 84'; Mamayev (yellow card) 86'	Report	Mamayev 15'; Martinović 30' (yellow card) 58'; Lakhiyalov 33' (red card) 64'; Asildarov (yellow card) 59'	Stadium: Dynamo Stadium; Attendance: 3,500; Referee: Vladislav Bezborodov

3 October 2007 35	Spartak-MZhK Ryazan	0 – 3	Terek Grozny	Ryazan
MSK (UTC+3)		Report		Stadium: CSK Stadium
Note: Match awarded to Terek Grozny after Spartak-MZhK Ryazan were expelled from the league.

6 October 2007 36	Ural Yekaterinburg	4 – 1	Terek Grozny	Yekaterinburg
15:00 MSK (UTC+3)	Mysin 17', 75'; E.Averyanov (yellow card) 30'; Skrylnikov 53'; Ramazanov 90' (o.g.)	Report	Tchuissé (yellow card) 15'; Zubko 58'; Ramazanov (yellow card) 30'; Siukayev (yellow card) 75'	Stadium: SKB-Bank Arena; Attendance: 3,500; Referee: Alexey Reznikov

13 October 2007 37	Terek Grozny	2 – 0	Baltika Kaliningrad	Pyatigorsk
16:00 MSK (UTC+3)	Sadayev 35'; Dzhabrailov 77'	Report		Stadium: Central Stadium; Attendance: 1,200; Referee: Denis Kozmin

16 October 2007 38	Terek Grozny	2 – 0	Torpedo Moscow	Pyatigorsk
16:00 MSK (UTC+3)	Dzhabrailov 7'; Zubko 10'; Romanovich (yellow card) 45'	Report	Smolnikov (yellow card) 15'; Perov (yellow card) 37'; Tumasyan (yellow card) 45'; Zemchenkov (yellow card) 69'	Stadium: Central Stadium; Attendance: 2,700; Referee: Igor Egorov

23 October 2007 39	KAMAZ	2 – 1	Terek Grozny	Naberezhnye Chelny
18:00 MSK (UTC+3)	Zeba (yellow card) 22'; Oganyan (yellow card) 53'; Gudukin (yellow card) 60'; Pimenov 62'; Ignatyev (yellow card) 88'; Grubješić 90+5'	Report	Levytskyi (yellow card) 11'; Ramazanov (yellow card) 33'; Siukayev (yellow card) 47' (yellow-red card) 75'	Stadium: KAMAZ Stadium; Attendance: 4,000; Referee: Nikolai Ivanov

26 October 2007 40	Mordovia Saransk	0 – 4	Terek Grozny	Saransk
18:00 MSK (UTC+3)		Report	Asildarov 2', 23'; Sadayev 79'; Adiyev 83'	Stadium: Start Stadium; Attendance: 3,500; Referee: Dmitry Popov

2 November 2007 41	Terek Grozny	3 – 0	Nosta Novotroitsk	Pyatigorsk
14:00 MSK (UTC+3)	Asildarov 45'; Dzhabrailov (yellow card) 70'; Bornosuzov 74'; Kulik 90'	Report	Zelenovskiy (yellow card) 6'; Alexeyev (yellow card) 45'; Baskov (yellow card) 63'	Stadium: Central Stadium; Attendance: 4,200; Referee: Almir Kayumov

5 November 2007 42	Terek Grozny	4 – 0	Sodovik Sterlitamak	Pyatigorsk
14:00 MSK (UTC+3)	Asildarov 5'; Ramazanov 20' (pen.); Dzhabrailov 30'; Fedkov 74'; Sadayev (yellow card) 79'	Report	Serebryakov (yellow card) 19'; Obozny 23'; Zakhlestin (yellow card) 79'	Stadium: Central Stadium; Attendance: 3,000; Referee: Alexander Evstigneev

==== League table ====
Pos	Team	Pld	W	D	L	GF	GA	GD	Pts	Promotion or relegation
1	Shinnik Yaroslavl (C, P)	42	28	8	6	68	30	+38	92	Promotion to Premier League
2	Terek Grozny (P)	42	28	6	8	69	27	+42	90	Promotion to Premier League
3	Sibir Novosibirsk	42	25	11	6	80	39	+41	86	
4	KAMAZ	42	23	8	11	67	34	+33	77	
5	Ural Sverdlovsk Oblast	42	21	14	7	70	33	+37	77	

Source: PFL, RSSSF
Rules for classification: 1) points; 2) goal difference; 3) number of goals scored.
(C) Champions; (P) Promoted

=== Russian Cup ===
==== 2007–08 ====
13 June 2007 Fifth round	Terek Grozny	2 – 0	Alania Vladikavkaz
MSK (UTC+3)	Zubko 50'; Kulik 65'			Attendance: 1,300

27 June 2007 Round of 32	Terek Grozny	1 – 1 (a.e.t.) (4 – 3 p)	Spartak Moscow	Lermontov
18:00 MSK (UTC+3)	Bornosuzov (yellow card) 62'; Memišević (yellow card) 74'; Kulik 80'; Siukayev (yellow card) 83'	Report	Ivanov (yellow card) 23'; Torbinski 53' (yellow card) 75'; Kalynychenko (yellow card) 83'	Stadium: Beshtau Stadium; Attendance: 4,100; Referee: Igor Egorov
	Penalties
	Bystrov (penalty missed); Torbinski (penalty scored); Kováč (penalty missed); Kalynychenko (penalty scored); Pavlyuchenko (penalty missed)		Adiyev (penalty scored); Kulik (penalty scored); Martinović (penalty missed); Testemițanu (penalty scored); Tchuissé (penalty missed)

8 August 2007 Round of 16	Amkar Perm	3 – 1	Terek Grozny	Perm
17:00 MSK (UTC+3)	Grishin 34'; Milovanović (yellow card) 36'; Kushev 42', 48'; Soldevilla (yellow card) 85'	Report	Dzhabrailov (yellow card) 27'; Krendelew (yellow card) 39'; Testemițanu (yellow card) 51'; Adiyev 90+'	Stadium: Zvezda Stadium; Attendance: 8,500; Referee: Vladislav Bezborodov

== Squad statistics ==
As of match played 5 November 2007

=== Appearances and goals ===
No.	Pos	Nat	Player	Total		Premier League		06-07 Russian Cup	
No.	Pos	Nat	Player	Apps	Goals	Apps	Goals	Apps	Goals
1	GK	(Kazakhstan) KAZ	Sergei Stepanenko	1	0	1	0	0	0
2	MF	(Russia) RUS	Murad Ramazanov	34	6	32+2	6	0	0
3	DF	(Russia) RUS	Anatoli Romanovich	9	2	8+1	2	0	0
5	MF	(Armenia) ARM	Albert Sarkisyan	10	0	5+5	0	0	0
6	MF	(Turkmenistan) TKM	Wýaçeslaw Krendelew	36	3	34+2	3	0	0
7	MF	(Russia) RUS	Taras Shelest	14	0	5+9	0	0	0
8	MF	(Bulgaria) BUL	Atanas Bornosuzov	34	2	27+7	2	0	0
9	FW	(Russia) RUS	Andrei Fedkov	19	4	5+14	4	0	0
10	FW	(Russia) RUS	Magomed Adiyev	29	7	15+14	7	0	0
11	FW	(Russia) RUS	Shamil Lakhiyalov	12	3	8+4	3	0	0
11	FW	(Armenia) ARM	Andrey Movsisyan	10	1	8+2	1	0	0
16	GK	(Ukraine) UKR	Maksym Levytskyi	40	0	40	0	0	0
17	MF	(Russia) RUS	Vladislav Kulik	35	7	22+13	7	0	0
18	DF	(Russia) RUS	Timur Dzhabrailov	36	7	28+8	7	0	0
20	FW	(Russia) RUS	Denis Zubko	36	8	32+4	8	0	0
21	MF	(Russia) RUS	Gamlet Siukayev	29	0	23+6	0	0	0
22	FW	(Cameroon) CMR	Jean Bouli	10	0	6+4	0	0	0
22	FW	(Russia) RUS	Zaur Sadayev	7	2	2+5	2	0	0
23	DF	(Bosnia and Herzegovina) BIH	Damir Memišević	32	2	30+2	2	0	0
24	DF	(Russia) RUS	Sergei Kurdyukov	3	0	1+2	0	0	0
25	DF	(Russia) RUS	Yevgeni Varlamov	27	3	27	3	0	0
29	FW	(Russia) RUS	Islam Tsuroyev	8	0	0+8	0	0	0
33	FW	(Russia) RUS	Shamil Asildarov	12	4	7+5	4	0	0
35	GK	(Russia) RUS	Rizavdi Edilov	1	0	0+1	0	0	0
40	DF	(Moldova) MDA	Ion Testemițanu	38	0	37+1	0	0	0
77	MF	(Bosnia and Herzegovina) BIH	Dejan Martinović	17	2	11+6	2	0	0
99	DF	(Cameroon) CMR	Jerry-Christian Tchuissé	38	0	37+1	0	0	0
Players away from the club on loan:
39	MF	(Russia) RUS	Adlan Katsayev	2	1	0+2	1	0	0
40	DF	(Russia) RUS	Rizvan Utsiyev	2	0	0+2	0	0	0
Players who appeared for Terek Grozny but left during the season:

=== Goal scorers ===
Place	Position	Nation	Number	Name	Premier League	07-08 Russian Cup	Total
1	FW	(Russia)	20	Denis Zubko	8	1	9
1	MF	(Russia)	17	Vladislav Kulik	7	2	9
3	FW	(Russia)	10	Magomed Adiyev	7	1	8
4	DF	(Russia)	18	Timur Dzhabrailov	7	0	7
5	FW	(Russia)	2	Murad Ramazanov	6	0	6
6	FW	(Russia)	33	Shamil Asildarov	4	0	4
6	DF	(Russia)	9	Andrei Fedkov	4	0	4
8	DF	(Russia)	25	Yevgeni Varlamov	3	0	3
8	MF	(Turkmenistan)	6	Wýaçeslaw Krendelew	3	0	3
8	MF	(Russia)	11	Shamil Lakhiyalov	3	0	3
11	MF	(Bulgaria)	8	Atanas Bornosuzov	2	0	2
11	MF	(Bosnia and Herzegovina)	77	Dejan Martinović	2	0	2
11	DF	(Bosnia and Herzegovina)	23	Damir Memišević	2	0	2
11	DF	(Russia)	3	Anatoli Romanovich	2	0	2
11	FW	(Russia)	22	Zaur Sadayev	2	0	2
16	MF	(Russia)	39	Adlan Katsayev	1	0	1
16	FW	(Russia)	11	Andrey Movsisyan	1	0	1
Total					64	4	68

=== Clean sheets ===
Place	Position	Nation	Number	Name	Premier League	07-08 Russian Cup	Total
1	GK	(Ukraine)	16	Maksym Levytskyi	24	0	24
2	GK			Unknown	0	1	1
Total					24	1	25

=== Disciplinary record ===
Number	Nation	Position	Name	Premier League		07-08 Russian Cup		Total	
Number	Nation	Position	Name	Yellow card	Red card	Yellow card	Red card	Yellow card	Red card
2	(Russia)	MF	Murad Ramazanov	11	0	0	0	11	0
3	(Russia)	DF	Anatoli Romanovich	1	0	0	0	1	0
5	(Armenia)	MF	Albert Sarkisyan	4	0	0	0	4	0
6	(Turkmenistan)	MF	Wýaçeslaw Krendelew	2	0	0	0	2	0
7	(Russia)	MF	Taras Shelest	2	0	0	0	2	0
8	(Bulgaria)	MF	Atanas Bornosuzov	8	0	0	0	8	0
10	(Russia)	FW	Magomed Adiyev	2	0	0	0	2	0
11	(Armenia)	FW	Andrey Movsisyan	0	1	0	0	0	1
11	(Russia)	FW	Shamil Lakhiyalov	0	1	0	0	0	1
16	(Ukraine)	GK	Maksym Levytskyi	3	0	0	0	3	0
17	(Russia)	MF	Vladislav Kulik	4	0	0	0	4	0
18	(Russia)	DF	Timur Dzhabrailov	9	0	0	0	9	0
20	(Russia)	FW	Denis Zubko	2	0	0	0	2	0
21	(Russia)	MF	Gamlet Siukayev	7	1	0	0	7	1
22	(Cameroon)	FW	Jean Bouli	1	0	0	0	1	0
22	(Russia)	FW	Zaur Sadayev	1	0	0	0	1	0
23	(Bosnia and Herzegovina)	DF	Damir Memišević	2	0	0	0	2	0
24	(Russia)	DF	Sergei Kurdyukov	1	0	0	0	1	0
25	(Russia)	DF	Yevgeni Varlamov	10	0	0	0	10	0
29	(Russia)	FW	Islam Tsuroyev	1	0	0	0	1	0
33	(Russia)	FW	Shamil Asildarov	2	0	0	0	2	0
40	(Moldova)	DF	Ion Testemițanu	1	0	0	0	1	0
77	(Bosnia and Herzegovina)	MF	Dejan Martinović	1	0	0	0	1	0
99	(Cameroon)	DF	Jerry-Christian Tchuissé	2	0	0	0	2	0
Players away on loan:
Players who left Terek Grozny during the season:
Total				77	3	0	0	77	3
