= 2007 FC Spartak Moscow season =

Spartak Moscow
2007 season
- Manager: Vladimir Fedotov (until June); Stanislav Cherchesov (from June)
- Stadium: Luzhniki Stadium
- Premier League: 2nd
- UEFA Cup: Round of 32 vs Celta Vigo
- Russian Cup: Semifinal vs Lokomotiv Moscow
- Russian Cup: Round of 32 vs Terek Grozny
- UEFA Champions League: Third Qualifying Round vs Celtic
- Top goalscorer: League: Roman Pavlyuchenko (14); All: Roman Pavlyuchenko (16)

The 2007 FC Spartak Moscow season was the club's 16th season in the Russian Premier League season. Spartak finished the season in 2nd position for the second year in a row, qualifying for the 2008–09 UEFA Champions League Third Qualifying Round. In the 2006–07 Russian Cup reached the semifinal before being knocked out by Lokomotiv Moscow, whilst in the 2007–08 Russian Cup they were knocked out at the Round of 32 stage by Terek Grozny. In Europe, Spartak were knocked out of the UEFA Cup by Celta Vigo before being knocked out of the 2007–08 UEFA Champions League by Celtic in the Third Qualifying Round.

== Season events ==
Vladimir Fedotov
(until June)
Stanislav Cherchesov
(from June)

== Squad ==
As of match played 11 November 2007

No.	Name	Nationality	Position	Date of birth (age)	Signed from	Signed in	Contract ends	Apps.	Goals
Goalkeepers
1	Dmitri Khomich	(Russia)	Gk	4 October 1984 (aged 23)	Alania Vladikavkaz	2005		10	0
12	Ivan Komissarov	(Russia)	GK	28 May 1988 (aged 19)	Youth Team	2005		0	0
16	Yevgeniy Gubin	(Russia)	GK	25 January 1989 (aged 18)	Youth Team	2005		0	0
22	Stipe Pletikosa	(Croatia)	GK	8 January 1979 (aged 28)	Shakhtar Donetsk	2007		35	0
30	Wojciech Kowalewski	(Poland)	GK	11 May 1977 (aged 30)	Shakhtar Donetsk	2003	2008	122	0
Defenders
2	Géder	(Brazil)	DF	23 April 1978 (aged 29)	Saturn Ramenskoye	2006		36	1
3	Martin Stranzl	(Austria)	DF	16 June 1980 (aged 27)	VfB Stuttgart	2006		27	2
13	Martin Jiránek	(Czech Republic)	DF	25 May 1979 (aged 28)	Reggina	2004		90	2
15	Radoslav Kováč	(Czech Republic)	DF	27 November 1979 (aged 27)	Sparta Prague	2005		105	11
33	Ilya Gultyayev	(Russia)	DF	5 September 1988 (aged 19)	Youth Team	2006		0	0
34	Renat Sabitov	(Russia)	DF	13 June 1985 (aged 22)	Saturn Ramenskoye	2007		18	0
36	Fyodor Kudryashov	(Russia)	DF	5 April 1987 (aged 20)	Sibiryak Bratsk	2005		11	0
49	Roman Shishkin	(Russia)	DF	27 January 1987 (aged 20)	Youth Team	2004		66	1
59	Andrei Ivanov	(Russia)	DF	8 October 1988 (aged 19)	Youth Team	2006		9	0
70	Ignas Dedura	(Lithuania)	DF	6 January 1978 (aged 29)	Skonto	2004		36	3
77	Yevgeni Shpedt	(Russia)	DF	26 January 1986 (aged 21)	Chkalovets-Olimpik Novosibirsk	2005	2007 (+2)	2	0
Midfielders
5	Mozart	(Brazil)	MF	8 November 1980 (aged 27)	Reggina	2005		74	9
6	Florin Șoavă	(Romania)	MF	24 July 1978 (aged 29)	Rapid București	2004	2008	64	1
7	Denis Boyarintsev	(Russia)	MF	6 February 1978 (aged 29)	Rubin Kazan	2005		93	14
9	Yegor Titov	(Russia)	MF	29 May 1976 (aged 31)	Youth Team	1995		427	102
14	Dmitri Torbinski	(Russia)	MF	28 April 1984 (aged 23)	Youth Team	2001		75	5
20	Aleksei Rebko	(Russia)	MF	23 April 1986 (aged 21)	Youth Team	2001		25	0
23	Vladimir Bystrov	(Russia)	MF	31 January 1984 (aged 23)	Zenit St.Petersburg	2005	2008	84	13
25	Maksym Kalynychenko	(Ukraine)	MF	26 January 1979 (aged 28)	Dnipro Dnipropetrovsk	2000		194	31
27	Serghei Covalciuc	(Moldova)	MF	20 January 1982 (aged 25)	Karpaty Lviv	2004		58	2
31	Sergei Parshivlyuk	(Russia)	MF	18 March 1989 (aged 18)	Youth Team	2007		2	0
37	Yehor Luhachov	(Ukraine)	MF	24 December 1988 (aged 18)	Lokomotyv Kyiv	2006		0	0
38	Artur Maloyan	(Russia)	MF	4 February 1989 (aged 18)	Youth Team	2007		0	0
89	Ádám Dudás	(Hungary)	MF	12 February 1989 (aged 18)	loan from Győri	2007		0	0
Forwards
10	Roman Pavlyuchenko	(Russia)	FW	15 December 1981 (aged 25)	Rotor Volgograd	2003		165	76
11	Welliton	(Brazil)	FW	22 October 1986 (aged 21)	Goiás	2007		14	4
17	Artyom Fomin	(Russia)	FW	8 July 1988 (aged 19)	Youth Team	2006		0	0
18	Aleksandr Prudnikov	(Russia)	FW	26 February 1989 (aged 18)	Youth Team	2007		14	3
32	Nikita Bazhenov	(Russia)	FW	1 February 1985 (aged 22)	Saturn Ramenskoye	2004		63	11
40	Artem Dzyuba	(Russia)	FW	22 August 1988 (aged 19)	Youth Team	2006		28	2
Away on loan
11	Aleksandr Pavlenko	(Russia)	MF	20 January 1985 (aged 22)	Lausanne-Sport	2001		112	10
21	Quincy Owusu-Abeyie	(Netherlands)	FW	15 April 1986 (aged 21)	Arsenal	2006		32	1
29	Amir Bazhev	(Russia)	MF	15 October 1988 (aged 19)	Youth Team	2006		0	0
41	Aleksandr Laktionov	(Russia)	FW	28 May 1986 (aged 21)	Youth Team	2005		1	0
55	Oleg Dineyev	(Russia)	MF	30 October 1987 (aged 20)	Youth Team	2007		3	0
	Clemente Rodríguez	(Argentina)	DF	31 July 1981 (aged 26)	Boca Juniors	2004		67	3
Players that left Spartak Moscow during the season
19	Fernando Cavenaghi	(Argentina)	FW	21 September 1983 (aged 24)	River Plate	2004		60	17
38	Yevgeny Krug	(Russia)	DF	20 April 1986 (aged 21)	Chkalovets-Olimpik Novosibirsk	2005		0	0

=== On loan ===
Note: Flags indicate national team as defined under FIFA eligibility rules; some limited exceptions apply. Players may hold more than one non-FIFA nationality.

No.	Pos.	Nation	Player
21	FW	NED	Quincy Owusu-Abeyie (at Celta Vigo)
29	MF	RUS	Amir Bazhev (at Spartak-MZhK Ryazan)
41	FW	RUS	Aleksandr Laktionov (at Liepājas Metalurgs)

No.	Pos.	Nation	Player
55	MF	RUS	Oleg Dineyev (at Shinnik Yaroslavl)
—	DF	ARG	Clemente Rodríguez (at Espanyol)

=== Left club during season ===
Note: Flags indicate national team as defined under FIFA eligibility rules; some limited exceptions apply. Players may hold more than one non-FIFA nationality.

No. / Pos. / Nation / Player; 19 / FW / ARG / Fernando Cavenaghi (to Bordeaux)	No. / Pos. / Nation / Player; 38 / DF / RUS / Yevgeny Krug (to Mordovia Saransk)

== Transfers ==
=== In ===
Date	Position	Nationality	Name	From	Fee	Ref.
21 December 2006	DF	(Russia)	Renat Sabitov	Saturn Ramenskoye	$200,000	
7 March 2007	GK	(Croatia)	Stipe Pletikosa	Shakhtar Donetsk	Undisclosed	
26 July 2007	FW	(Brazil)	Welliton	Goiás	Undisclosed	

=== Loans in ===
Date from	Position	Nationality	Name	From	Date to	Ref.
9 August 2007	MF	(Hungary)	Ádám Dudás	Győri	End of Season	

=== Out ===
Date	Position	Nationality	Name	To	Fee	Ref.
21 January 2007	FW	(Argentina)	Fernando Cavenaghi	Bordeaux	€7,000,000	
Summer 2007	DF	(Russia)	Yevgeny Krug	Mordovia Saransk	Undisclosed	

=== Loans out ===
Date from	Position	Nationality	Name	To	Date to	Ref.
Winter 2007	DF	(Argentina)	Clemente Rodríguez	Boca Juniors	Summer 2007	
27 March 2007	MF	(Russia)	Amir Bazhev	Spartak-MZhK Ryazan	End of Season	
22 June 2007	DF	(Argentina)	Clemente Rodríguez	Espanyol	Summer 2008	
2 September 2007	FW	(Netherlands)	Quincy Owusu-Abeyie	Celta Vigo	Summer 2008	
Summer 2007	MF	(Russia)	Oleg Dineyev	Shinnik Yaroslavl	End of Season	
Summer 2007	FW	(Russia)	Aleksandr Laktionov	Liepājas Metalurgs	End of Season	

=== Released ===
Date	Position	Nationality	Name	Joined	Date
31 December 2007	GK	(Poland)	Wojciech Kowalewski	Korona Kielce	4 February 2008
31 December 2007	DF	(Russia)	Yevgeni Shpedt	KAMAZ	
31 December 2007	MF	(Russia)	Denis Boyarintsev	Shinnik Yaroslavl	
31 December 2007	MF	(Russia)	Aleksei Rebko	Rubin Kazan	
31 December 2007	MF	(Russia)	Dmitri Torbinski	Lokomotiv Moscow	

== Competitions ==
=== UEFA Cup ===
==== Knockout stages ====
15 February 2007 Round of 32 1st leg	CSKA Moscow (Russia)	1 – 1	(Spain) Celta Vigo	Moscow, Russia
18:00 MSK (UTC+3)	Kalynychenko (yellow card) 43' (goal) 65'; Titov (yellow card) 88'	Report	Núñez 41'	Stadium: Luzhniki Stadium; Attendance: 35,000; Referee: Costas Kapitanis (Cyprus)

22 February 2007 Round of 32 2nd leg	Celta Vigo (Spain)	2 – 1 (3 – 2 agg.)	(Russia) Spartak Moscow	Vigo, Spain
22:45 MSK (DST) (UTC+4)	Placente (yellow card) 17'; Nenê 19'; Canobbio (yellow card) 35'; Aspas 78'; Iriney (yellow card) 86'	Report	Mozart (yellow card) 86'; Titov 88'; Pavlyuchenko (yellow card) 90'	Stadium: Balaídos; Attendance: 8,000; Referee: Laurent Duhamel (France)

=== Premier League ===
==== Results by round ====
Round	1	2	3	4	5	6	7	8	9	10	11	12	13	14	15	16	17	18	19	20	21	22	23	24	25	26	27	28	29	30
Ground	A	H	A	H	A	H	A	H	A	H	A	H	A	H	A	A	H	A	H	A	H	A	H	A	H	A	H	A	H	H
Result	W	D	W	W	D	W	D	W	D	L	L	D	L	W	W	W	W	D	W	W	W	L	D	L	W	W	W	D	W	W

Updated to match(es) played on 11 November 2007. Source: See Results
A = Away; H = Home; W = Win; D = Draw; L = Loss

==== Results ====
11 March 2007 1	Dynamo Moscow	0 – 1	Spartak Moscow	Moscow
16:00 MSK (UTC+3)	Tanasijević (yellow card) 7' (yellow-red card) 84'; K.Kombarov (yellow card) 11'; Klimavičius (yellow card) 18'; Semshov (yellow card) 57'	Report	Mozart (yellow card) 9'; Titov 80'	Stadium: Dynamo Stadium; Attendance: 22,000; Referee: Aleksei Nikolaev

18 March 2007 2	Spartak Moscow	0 – 0	Amkar Perm	Moscow
18:00 MSK (UTC+3)	Torbinski (yellow card) 10'; Shishkin (yellow card) 27'; Bystrov (yellow card) 45'; Kudryashov (yellow card) 50'; Dzyuba (yellow card) 60'; Mozart (red card) 84'	Report	Kobenko (yellow card) 21'; Popov (yellow card) 43'; Peev (yellow card) 77'; Savin (yellow card) 80'; Kushev (yellow card) 90+'; Sirakov (yellow card) 90+'	Stadium: Luzhniki Stadium; Attendance: 12,000; Referee: Eduard Malyi

31 March 2007 3	Zenit St.Petersburg	1 – 3	Spartak Moscow	Saint Petersburg
14:00 MSK (DST) (UTC+4)	Tymoshchuk (yellow card) 5'; Pogrebnyak (yellow card) 13' (yellow-red card) 90' (goal) 85'; Škrtel (yellow card) 90+'	Report	Titov 2'; Rebko (yellow card) 19' (yellow-red card) 40'; Stranzl 23' (yellow card) 90+'; Bystrov 37' (pen.); Torbinski (yellow card) 40'; Șoavă (yellow card) 65'; Boyarintsev (yellow card) 81'	Stadium: Petrovsky Stadium; Attendance: 20,036; Referee: Igor Egorov

9 April 2007 4	Spartak Moscow	2 – 1	Luch-Energiya Vladivostok	Moscow
17:00 MSK (DST) (UTC+4)	Titov 75'; Prudnikov 87'	Report	Novković (yellow card) 32'; Ivanov 63'	Stadium: Luzhniki Stadium; Attendance: 22,000; Referee: Stanislav Sukhina

15 April 2007 5	Tom Tomsk	1 – 1	Spartak Moscow	Tomsk
15:00 MSK (DST) (UTC+4)	Kiselyov 22' (yellow card) 66'; Yanotovsky (yellow card) 69'	Report	Sabitov (yellow card) 11'; Géder (yellow card) 66'; Dzyuba 72'; Titov (penalty missed) 80'	Stadium: Trud Stadium; Attendance: 15,000; Referee: Igor Egorov

22 April 2007 6	Spartak Moscow	1 – 0	Krylia Sovetov	Moscow
16:00 MSK (DST) (UTC+4)	Torbinski 10' (yellow card) 84'; Dineyev (yellow card) 24'	Report	Bobyor (yellow card) 20'; Kowba (yellow card) 22'; Booth (yellow card) 87'; Łągiewka (yellow card) 90+'	Stadium: Luzhniki Stadium; Attendance: 14,000; Referee: Nikolai Ivanov

29 April 2007 7	Kuban Krasnodar	0 – 0	Spartak Moscow	Krasnodar
20:00 MSK (DST) (UTC+4)		Report	Kováč (yellow card) 65'	Stadium: Kuban Stadium; Attendance: 28,000; Referee: Alexander Evstigneev

6 May 2007 8	Spartak Moscow	2 – 1	Rubin Kazan	Moscow
14:00 MSK (DST) (UTC+4)	Boyarintsev (yellow card) 39' (goal) 90+'; Titov 45+'	Report	Jean (yellow card) 26'; Gilmullin (yellow card) 45'; Budylin 90' (pen.)	Stadium: Luzhniki Stadium; Attendance: 12,000; Referee: Alexander Gonchar

12 May 2007 9	CSKA Moscow	1 – 1	Spartak Moscow	Moscow
14:00 MSK (DST) (UTC+4)	Krasić 14' (yellow card) 14'; Jô (yellow card) 77'	Report	Titov (yellow card) 43'; Pavlyuchenko (yellow card) 43'; Torbinski (yellow card) 56'; Bystrov 69'; Jiránek (yellow card) 87'; Kalynychenko (yellow card) 90'	Stadium: Luzhniki Stadium; Attendance: 45,000; Referee: Igor Zakharov

19 May 2007 10	Spartak Moscow	1 – 2	Lokomotiv Moscow	Moscow
14:00 MSK (DST) (UTC+4)	Pavlyuchenko (yellow card) 34' (goal) 71'; Prudnikov (yellow card) 70'	Report	Rodolfo (yellow card) 6'; Bilyaletdinov 38'; Samedov (yellow card) 82'; Sychev 84'; Kontsedalov (yellow card) 90'; Fininho (yellow card) 90+'	Stadium: Luzhniki Stadium; Attendance: 28,000; Referee: Jaroslav Jára

25 May 2007 11	Khimki	3 – 0	Spartak Moscow	Khimki
19:00 MSK (DST) (UTC+4)	Shirokov 5'; Arkhipov 23'; Čeh (yellow card) 45'; Jovanović 54'; Tikhonov (yellow card) 80'	Report	Kudryashov (yellow card) 25'; Shishkin (yellow card) 45'; Kováč (yellow card) 62'; Covalciuc (yellow card) 72'; Géder (yellow card) 78'	Stadium: Rodina Stadium; Attendance: 9,500; Referee: Aleksandr Gvardis

10 June 2007 12	Spartak Moscow	2 – 2	Spartak Nalchik	Moscow
14:00 MSK (DST) (UTC+4)	Géder (yellow card) 40'; Titov 48'; Mozart (yellow card) 53'; Pavlyuchenko 76'; Torbinski (yellow card) 83'; Stranzl (yellow card) 87'; Bystrov (yellow card) 89'	Report	Jesus 36', 44'; Matić (yellow card) 53'; Filatov (yellow card) 61'; Džudović (yellow card) 90+'; Radić (yellow card) 90+'	Stadium: Luzhniki Stadium; Attendance: 13,000; Referee: Alexander Evstigneev

17 June 2007 13	FC Moscow	2 – 0	Spartak Moscow	Moscow
14:00 MSK (DST) (UTC+4)	Semak 5'; Ivanov (yellow card) 24'; Adamov 34'	Report	V.Bystrov (yellow card) 41'; Pavlyuchenko (yellow card) 45'	Stadium: Eduard Streltsov Stadium; Attendance: 10,000; Referee: Gerald Lehner

22 June 2007 14	Spartak Moscow	2 – 0	Saturn Ramenskoye	Moscow
19:00 MSK (DST) (UTC+4)	Shishkin (yellow card) 22'; Pavlyuchenko (penalty missed) 40' 90+'; Stranzl 58'	Report	Lebedenko (yellow card) 45+'; Shilla (red card) 66'	Stadium: Luzhniki Stadium; Attendance: 13,000; Referee: Nikolai Ivanov

30 June 2007 15	Rostov	1 – 3	Spartak Moscow	Rostov-on-Don
MSK (DST) (UTC+4)	Burchenko (yellow card) 17' (yellow-red card) 69'; Mogilevskiy (yellow card) 34'; Kanyenda 37'; Kalachev (yellow card) 67'	Report	Bazhenov (yellow card) 1' (goal) 90+'; Kováč 31'; Torbinski 39'	Stadium: Olimp-2; Attendance: 12,000; Referee: Stanislav Sukhina

14 July 2007 16	Amkar Perm	0 – 1	Spartak Moscow	Perm
16:00 MSK (DST) (UTC+4)	Lavrik (yellow card) 10'; Gaál (yellow card) 85'; Volkov (yellow card) 90+'	Report	Kováč (yellow card) 20'; Titov 38'; Shishkin (yellow card) 86'; Șoavă (yellow card) 90+'	Stadium: Zvezda Stadium; Attendance: 18,500; Referee: Igor Egorov

21 July 2007 17	Spartak Moscow	3 – 1	Zenit St.Petersburg	Moscow
14:00 MSK (DST) (UTC+4)	Mozart (yellow card) 7'; Pavlyuchenko 28', 61' (pen.) (yellow card) 84'; Torbinski (yellow card) 30'; Jiránek (yellow card) 32'; Bystrov (yellow card) 50'; Bazhenov 83'; Stranzl (yellow card) 90+'	Report	Hagen (yellow card) 6'; Arshavin 45'; Škrtel (yellow card) 57'; Malafeev (red card) 58'; Šírl (yellow card) 71'; Ricksen (yellow card) 82'; Čontofalský (yellow card) 84'; Tymoshchuk (yellow card) 84'	Stadium: Luzhniki Stadium; Attendance: 45,000; Referee: Aleksandr Gonchar

28 July 2007 18	Luch-Energiya Vladivostok	1 – 1	Spartak Moscow	Vladivostok
12:00 MSK (DST) (UTC+4)	D.N.Smirnov 9' (yellow card) 53'; D.A.Smirnov (yellow card) 58'; Kralevski (yellow card) 63'; R.Ajinjal (yellow card) 67'	Report	Kalynychenko (yellow card) 21' (yellow-red card) 90'; Titov (yellow card) 45'; Prudnikov 53'; Kováč (yellow card) 74'	Stadium: Dynamo Stadium; Attendance: 10,200; Referee: Valentin Ivanov

5 August 2007 19	Spartak Moscow	3 – 2	Tom Tomsk	Moscow
19:00 MSK (DST) (UTC+4)	Stranzl (yellow card) 55'; Torbinski 56'; Pavlyuchenko 82'; Boyarintsev 89' (yellow card) 90'	Report	Tarasov (yellow card) 25'; Michkov 29' (pen.); Klimov (yellow card) 41'; Kulchy (yellow card) 56'; Bulyga 64'; Radosavljević (yellow card) 67'	Stadium: Luzhniki Stadium; Attendance: 18,000; Referee: Eduard Malyi

11 August 2007 20	Krylia Sovetov	0 – 2	Spartak Moscow	Samara
17:00 MSK (DST) (UTC+4)	Branco (yellow card) 50'	Report	Bazhenov 24'; Pavlyuchenko 39'; Torbinski (yellow card) 63'	Stadium: Metallurg Stadium; Attendance: 22,000; Referee: Aleksandr Gvardis

19 August 2007 21	Spartak Moscow	4 – 0	Kuban Krasnodar	Moscow
17:00 MSK (DST) (UTC+4)	Pavlyuchenko 2', 39', 51'; Bystrov 61'; Shishkin (yellow card) 65'	Report	Kaleshin (yellow card) 87'	Stadium: Luzhniki Stadium; Attendance: 16,000; Referee: Nikolai Ivanov

25 August 2007 22	Rubin Kazan	3 – 1	Spartak Moscow	Kazan
18:00 MSK (DST) (UTC+4)	Paunović 20'; Noboa 49' (yellow card) 81'; Vasilyev (yellow card) 60' (yellow-red card) 65'; Kabze 62'	Report	Pavlyuchenko (yellow card) 22'; Welliton 37'; Bystrov (yellow card) 67'; Kalynychenko (yellow card) 89'; Kováč (yellow card) 90+'	Stadium: Central Stadium; Attendance: 20,000; Referee: Stanislav Sukhina

2 September 2007 23	Spartak Moscow	1 – 1	CSKA Moscow	Moscow
14:00 MSK (DST) (UTC+4)	Mozart 30' (pen.) (yellow card) 81'; Bystrov (yellow card) 83'	Report	Ignashevich (yellow card) 27'; Ratinho (yellow card) 84'; Janczyk 90+4'	Stadium: Luzhniki Stadium; Attendance: 65,000; Referee: Alberto Mallenco

23 September 2007 24	Lokomotiv Moscow	4 – 3	Spartak Moscow	Moscow
14:00 MSK (DST) (UTC+4)	Samedov (yellow card) 7'; Odemwingie 30', 68'; Sychev 42' (yellow card) 87'; Sennikov (yellow card) 57'; Maminov (yellow card) 71'; Gurenko (yellow card) 81'; Asatiani (yellow card) 85' (goal) 90+'	Report	Bystrov (yellow card) 23'; Pavlyuchenko 11' (pen.), 20', 76'; Sabitov (yellow card) 56'; Dzyuba (yellow card) 85'; Boyarintsev (yellow card) 90+'	Stadium: Lokomotiv Stadium; Attendance: 27,503; Referee: Aleksandr Kolobaev

29 September 2007 25	Spartak Moscow	2 – 0	Khimki	Moscow
16:00 MSK (DST) (UTC+4)	Bazhenov 15'; Pavlyuchenko (yellow card) 32'; Titov 48' (yellow card) 66'	Report	Tikhonov (yellow card) 30'	Stadium: Luzhniki Stadium; Attendance: 14,000; Referee: Vitali Doroshenko

7 October 2007 26	Spartak Nalchik	1 – 2	Spartak Moscow	Nalchik
MSK (DST) (UTC+4)	Pylypchuk 51'; Kisenkov (yellow card) 79'	Report	Kalynychenko 21', 84'; Mozart (yellow card) 45'; Kováč (yellow card) 58'	Stadium: Spartak Stadium; Attendance: 14,200; Referee: Aleksandr Gvardis

20 October 2007 27	Spartak Moscow	3 – 1	FC Moscow	Moscow
14:00 MSK (DST) (UTC+4)	Dedura 14' (red card) 16'; Géder 61'; Welliton 90'	Report	Semak (yellow card) 11'; Barrientos (yellow card) 14' (red card) 16'; López 21'; Ivanov (yellow card) 28'; Bracamonte (yellow card) 84'	Stadium: Luzhniki Stadium; Attendance: 28,000; Referee: Yuri Baskakov

28 October 2007 28	Saturn Ramenskoye	0 – 0	Spartak Moscow	Ramenskoye
14:00 MSK (UTC+3)	Karyaka (yellow card) 72'	Report	Kalynychenko (yellow card) 64'; Shishkin (yellow card) 73'; Kováč (yellow card) 76'; Mozart (yellow card) 80'	Stadium: Saturn Stadium; Attendance: 14,700; Referee: Igor Egorov

3 November 2007 29	Spartak Moscow	3 – 0	Rostov	Moscow
14:00 MSK (UTC+3)	Welliton (yellow card) 38' (goal) 68'; Kalynychenko 41'; Boyarintsev 75'	Report	Bendz (yellow card) 22'; Gerus (yellow card) 37'; Kalachev (yellow card) 38'; Vještica (yellow card) 40'; Dzhioyev (yellow card) 42'	Stadium: Luzhniki Stadium; Attendance: 15,000; Referee: Vitali Doroshenko

11 November 2007 30	Spartak Moscow	2 – 1	Dynamo Moscow	Moscow
14:00 MSK (UTC+3)	Pavlyuchenko 25'; Welliton 52'	Report	Khokhlov (yellow card) 45'; Danny 71'	Stadium: Luzhniki Stadium; Attendance: 37,000; Referee: Aleksandr Gvardis

==== League table ====
Pos	Team	Pld	W	D	L	GF	GA	GD	Pts	Qualification or relegation
1	Zenit St. Petersburg (C)	30	18	7	5	54	32	+22	61	Qualification to Champions League group stage
2	Spartak Moscow	30	17	8	5	50	30	+20	59	Qualification to Champions League third qualifying round
3	CSKA Moscow	30	14	11	5	43	24	+19	53	Qualification to UEFA Cup first round (Note: Qualified as the winner of 2007–08 Russian Cup)
4	FC Moscow	30	15	7	8	40	32	+8	52	Qualification to UEFA Cup second qualifying round
5	Saturn	30	11	12	7	34	28	+6	45	Qualification to Intertoto Cup second round

Source: RFPL
Rules for classification: 1st points; 2nd matches won; 3rd goal difference; 4th head-to-head (points, matches won, goal difference, goals scored, away goals scored); 5th goals scored; 6th away goals scored; 7th drawing of lots
(C) Champions

=== Russian Cup ===
==== 2006-07 ====
18 February 2007 Round of 16 1st leg	Spartak Moscow	1 – 0	Sibir Novosibirsk	Moscow
17:00 MSK (DST) (UTC+4)	Boyarintsev 20'	Report		Stadium: Luzhniki Stadium; Attendance: 5,000; Referee: Aleksandr Gonchar

26 February 2007 Round of 16 2nd leg	Sibir Novosibirsk	1 – 3 (1 – 4 agg.)	Spartak Moscow	Novosibirsk
15:00 MSK (DST) (UTC+4)	Sharin 18' Nagibin (yellow card) 21'; Shestakov (yellow card) 22'; Chirkin (yellow card) 23'; Olenikov (yellow card) 90'	Report	Jiránek (yellow card) 21'; Boyarintsev (yellow card) 29' (goal) 55'; Torbinski (yellow card) 32'; Géder (yellow card) 38'; Mozart (yellow card) 57'; Dzyuba 72'; Titov 76'	Stadium: Spartak Stadium; Attendance: 7,200; Referee: Sergei Timofeyev

4 April 2007 Quarterfinal 1st leg	Zenit St.Petersburg	1 – 2	Spartak Moscow	Saint Petersburg
19:30 MSK (DST) (UTC+4)	Radimov (yellow card) 1'; Kim (yellow card) 7'; Križanac (yellow card) 27'; Pogrebnyak 71'; Domínguez (yellow card) 84'	Report	Stranzl (yellow card) 25'; Torbinski (yellow card) 33'; Mozart 45' (pen.); Dzyuba 69'; Titov (yellow card) 70'	Stadium: Petrovsky Stadium; Attendance: 19,500; Referee: Aleksandr Gvardis

18 April 2007 Quarterfinal 2nd leg	Spartak Moscow	1 – 1 (3 – 2 agg.)	Zenit St.Petersburg	Moscow
19:00 MSK (DST) (UTC+4)	Dineyev (yellow card) 14'; Prudnikov 17'	Report	Šírl (yellow card) 28'; Pogrebnyak 52'; Škrtel (yellow card) 56'; Malafeev (yellow card) 59'; Arshavin (yellow card) 60'	Stadium: Luzhniki Stadium; Attendance: 35,500; Referee: Stanislav Sukhina

2 May 2007 Semifinal 1st leg	Lokomotiv Moscow	3 – 0	Spartak Moscow	Moscow
19:00 MSK (DST) (UTC+4)	Sychev 2'; O'Connor 42'; Bilyaletdinov 45'; Jakupović (yellow card) 82'	Report	Șoavă (yellow card) 42'; Bystrov (yellow card) 77'	Stadium: Lokomotiv Stadium; Attendance: 23,723; Referee: Aleksei Nikolaev

9 May 2007 Semifinal 2nd leg	Spartak Moscow	1 – 2 (1 – 5 agg.)	Lokomotiv Moscow	Moscow
14:00 MSK (DST) (UTC+4)	Șoavă (yellow card) 15'; Géder (yellow card) 39'; Boyarintsev 53'; Mozart (yellow card) 69'; Pavlyuchenko (yellow card) 69'; Kalynychenko (yellow card) 72'	Report	Cociș 71'; Fininho (yellow card) 83'; Spahić (yellow card) 85'; Sychev 88'	Stadium: Luzhniki Stadium; Attendance: 15,000; Referee: Valentin Ivanov

==== 2007-08 ====
27 June 2007 Round of 32	Terek Grozny	1 – 1 (a.e.t.) (4 – 3 p)	Spartak Moscow	Lermontov
18:00 MSK (DST) (UTC+4)	Bornosuzov (yellow card) 62'; Memišević (yellow card) 74'; Kulik 80'; Siukayev (yellow card) 83'	Report	Ivanov (yellow card) 23'; Torbinski 53' (yellow card) 75'; Kalynychenko (yellow card) 83'	Stadium: Beshtau Stadium; Attendance: 4,100; Referee: Igor Egorov
	Penalties
	Adiev (penalty scored); Kulik (penalty scored); Martinović (penalty missed); Testemitanu (penalty scored); Tchuissé (penalty scored)		(penalty missed) Bystrov; (penalty scored) Torbinski; (penalty missed) Kováč; (penalty scored) Kalynychenko; (penalty scored) Pavlyuchenko

=== UEFA Champions League ===
==== Qualifying rounds ====
15 August 2007 Third Qualifying Round 1st leg	Spartak Moscow (Russia)	1 – 1	(Scotland) Celtic	Moscow, Russia
20:00 MSK (DST) (UTC+4)	Pavlyuchenko 42'; Stranzl (yellow card) 90'	Report	Hartley 21'; Naylor (yellow card) 40'; Brown (yellow card) 69'	Stadium: Luzhniki Stadium; Attendance: 5,000; Referee: Herbert Fandel (Germany)

29 August 2007 Third Qualifying Round 2nd leg	Celtic (Scotland)	1 – 1 (a.e.t.) (2 – 2 agg.) (4–3 p)	(Russia) Spartak Moscow	Glasgow, Scotland
22:45 MSK (DST) (UTC+4)	McDonald 27'; Caldwell (yellow card) 29'; Riordan (yellow card) 118'	Report	Pavlyuchenko 45'; Shishkin (yellow card) 83'; Stranzl (red card) 84'; Torbinski (yellow card) 101'	Stadium: Celtic Park; Attendance: 57,644; Referee: Roberto Rosetti (Italy)
	Penalties
	Caldwell (penalty scored); Nakamura (penalty missed); Vennegoor of Hesselink (penalty scored); Riordan (penalty scored); Żurawski (penalty scored)		(penalty scored) Mozart; (penalty missed) Titov; (penalty scored) Pavlyuchenko; (penalty scored) Șoavă; (penalty missed) Kalynychenko

== Squad statistics ==
As of match played 11 November 2007

=== Appearances and goals ===
No.	Pos	Nat	Player	Total		Premier League		2006-07 Russian Cup		2007-08 Russian Cup		UEFA Cup		UEFA Champions League	
No.	Pos	Nat	Player	Apps	Goals	Apps	Goals	Apps	Goals	Apps	Goals	Apps	Goals	Apps	Goals
1	GK	(Russia) RUS	Dmitri Khomich	5	0	1	0	2	0	0	0	2	0	0	0
2	DF	(Brazil) BRA	Géder	22	1	13+1	1	5+1	0	0	0	2	0	0	0
3	DF	(Austria) AUT	Martin Stranzl	27	2	18+1	2	3	0	1	0	2	0	2	0
5	MF	(Brazil) BRA	Mozart	29	2	19	1	6	1	0	0	2	0	2	0
6	MF	(Romania) ROU	Florin Șoavă	22	0	17+1	0	2	0	0	0	0	0	2	0
7	MF	(Russia) RUS	Denis Boyarintsev	32	5	7+16	3	3+2	2	1	0	0+2	0	0+1	0
9	MF	(Russia) RUS	Yegor Titov	36	9	27	7	4	1	0+1	0	2	1	2	0
10	FW	(Russia) RUS	Roman Pavlyuchenko	29	16	21+1	14	1+1	0	1	0	2	0	2	2
11	FW	(Brazil) BRA	Welliton	14	4	10+2	4	0	0	0	0	0	0	2	0
13	DF	(Czech Republic) CZE	Martin Jiránek	16	0	11	0	3	0	0	0	2	0	0	0
14	MF	(Russia) RUS	Dmitri Torbinski	34	4	19+5	3	4+1	0	1	1	2	0	2	0
15	DF	(Czech Republic) CZE	Radoslav Kováč	35	1	22+4	1	4	0	1	0	2	0	2	0
18	FW	(Russia) RUS	Aleksandr Prudnikov	14	3	3+8	2	2	1	1	0	0	0	0	0
20	MF	(Russia) RUS	Aleksei Rebko	8	0	3	0	2+3	0	0	0	0	0	0	0
22	GK	(Croatia) CRO	Stipe Pletikosa	35	0	29	0	3	0	1	0	0	0	2	0
23	MF	(Russia) RUS	Vladimir Bystrov	27	3	16+2	3	3+1	0	0+1	0	2	0	2	0
25	MF	(Ukraine) UKR	Maksym Kalynychenko	31	4	13+9	3	3+1	0	1	0	2	1	0+2	0
27	MF	(Moldova) MDA	Serghei Covalciuc	2	0	1+1	0	0	0	0	0	0	0	0	0
30	GK	(Poland) POL	Wojciech Kowalewski	1	0	0	0	1	0	0	0	0	0	0	0
31	MF	(Russia) RUS	Sergei Parshivlyuk	2	0	0+2	0	0	0	0	0	0	0	0	0
32	FW	(Russia) RUS	Nikita Bazhenov	20	5	13+3	4	2+1	1	0	0	0+1	0	0	0
34	DF	(Russia) RUS	Renat Sabitov	18	0	12+3	0	2	0	1	0	0	0	0	0
36	DF	(Russia) RUS	Fyodor Kudryashov	9	0	6+1	0	2	0	0	0	0	0	0	0
40	FW	(Russia) RUS	Artem Dzyuba	20	3	6+9	1	1+3	2	0	0	0+1	0	0	0
49	DF	(Russia) RUS	Roman Shishkin	35	0	25+1	0	4+2	0	1	0	0	0	2	0
59	DF	(Russia) RUS	Andrei Ivanov	8	0	7	0	0	0	1	0	0	0	0	0
70	DF	(Lithuania) LTU	Ignas Dedura	7	1	6	1	0	0	0	0	0	0	0+1	0
Players away from the club on loan:
11	MF	(Russia) RUS	Aleksandr Pavlenko	1	0	0	0	0+1	0	0	0	0	0	0	0
21	FW	(Netherlands) NED	Quincy Owusu-Abeyie	8	0	4+1	0	3	0	0	0	0	0	0	0
55	MF	(Russia) RUS	Oleg Dineyev	3	0	1	0	2	0	0	0	0	0	0	0
Players who appeared for Spartak Moscow but left during the season:

=== Goal scorers ===
Place	Position	Nation	Number	Name	Premier League	2006-07 Russian Cup	2007-08 Russian Cup	UEFA Cup	UEFA Champions League	Total
1	FW	(Russia)	10	Roman Pavlyuchenko	14	0	0	0	2	16
2	MF	(Russia)	9	Yegor Titov	7	1	0	1	0	9
3	MF	(Russia)	7	Denis Boyarintsev	3	3	0	0	0	6
4	FW	(Russia)	32	Nikita Bazhenov	4	0	0	0	0	4
4	FW	(Brazil)	11	Welliton	4	0	0	0	0	4
4	MF	(Russia)	14	Dmitri Torbinski	3	0	1	0	0	4
4	MF	(Ukraine)	25	Maksym Kalynychenko	3	0	0	1	0	4
8	MF	(Russia)	23	Vladimir Bystrov	3	0	0	0	0	3
8	FW	(Russia)	18	Aleksandr Prudnikov	2	1	0	0	0	3
8	FW	(Russia)	40	Artem Dzyuba	1	2	0	0	0	3
11	MF	(Austria)	3	Martin Stranzl	2	0	0	0	0	2
11	MF	(Brazil)	5	Mozart	1	1	0	0	0	2
13	DF	(Czech Republic)	15	Radoslav Kováč	1	0	0	0	0	1
13	DF	(Lithuania)	70	Ignas Dedura	1	0	0	0	0	1
13	DF	(Brazil)	2	Géder	1	0	0	0	0	1
TOTALS					50	8	1	2	2	63

=== Clean sheets ===
Place	Position	Nation	Number	Name	Premier League	2006-07 Russian Cup	2007-08 Russian Cup	UEFA Cup	UEFA Champions League	Total
1	GK	(Croatia)	22	Stipe Pletikosa	10	0	0	0	0	10
2	GK	(Russia)	1	Dmitri Khomich	1	1	0	1	0	3
TOTALS					11	1	0	1	0	13

=== Disciplinary record ===
Number	Nation	Position	Name	Premier League		2005-06 Russian Cup		2006-07 Russian Cup		UEFA Cup		UEFA Champions League		Total	
Number	Nation	Position	Name	Yellow card	Red card	Yellow card	Red card	Yellow card	Red card	Yellow card	Red card	Yellow card	Red card	Yellow card	Red card
2	(Brazil)	DF	Géder	3	0	2	0	0	0	0	0	0	0	5	0
3	(Austria)	DF	Martin Stranzl	4	0	1	0	0	0	0	0	1	1	6	1
5	(Brazil)	MF	Mozart	6	1	2	0	0	0	1	0	0	0	9	1
6	(Romania)	MF	Florin Șoavă	2	0	2	0	0	0	0	0	0	0	4	0
7	(Russia)	MF	Denis Boyarintsev	4	0	1	0	0	0	0	0	0	0	5	0
9	(Russia)	MF	Yegor Titov	3	0	1	0	0	0	1	0	0	0	5	0
10	(Russia)	FW	Roman Pavlyuchenko	6	0	1	0	0	0	1	0	0	0	8	0
11	(Brazil)	FW	Welliton	1	0	0	0	0	0	0	0	0	0	1	0
13	(Czech Republic)	DF	Martin Jiránek	2	0	1	0	0	0	0	0	0	0	3	0
14	(Russia)	MF	Dmitri Torbinski	7	0	2	0	1	0	0	0	1	0	11	0
15	(Czech Republic)	DF	Radoslav Kováč	7	0	0	0	0	0	0	0	0	0	7	0
18	(Russia)	FW	Aleksandr Prudnikov	1	0	0	0	0	0	0	0	0	0	1	0
20	(Russia)	MF	Aleksei Rebko	2	1	0	0	0	0	0	0	0	0	2	1
23	(Russia)	MF	Vladimir Bystrov	7	0	1	0	0	0	0	0	0	0	8	0
25	(Ukraine)	MF	Maksym Kalynychenko	5	1	1	0	1	0	1	0	0	0	8	1
27	(Moldova)	MF	Serghei Covalciuc	1	0	0	0	0	0	0	0	0	0	1	0
32	(Russia)	FW	Nikita Bazhenov	1	0	0	0	0	0	0	0	0	0	1	0
34	(Russia)	DF	Renat Sabitov	2	0	0	0	0	0	0	0	0	0	2	0
36	(Russia)	DF	Fyodor Kudryashov	2	0	0	0	0	0	0	0	0	0	2	0
40	(Russia)	FW	Artem Dzyuba	2	0	0	0	0	0	0	0	0	0	2	0
49	(Russia)	DF	Roman Shishkin	6	0	0	0	0	0	0	0	1	0	7	0
59	(Russia)	DF	Andrei Ivanov	0	0	0	0	1	0	0	0	0	0	1	0
70	(Lithuania)	DF	Ignas Dedura	0	1	0	0	0	0	0	0	0	0	0	1
Players away on loan:
55	(Russia)	MF	Oleg Dineyev	1	0	1	0	0	0	0	0	0	0	2	0
Players who left Spartak Moscow season during the season:
Total				75	4	16	0	3	0	4	0	3	1	101	5
