= Andrei Romanov =

Andrei Romanov may refer to:

- Grand Duke Andrei Vladimirovich of Russia, Russian grand duke
- Prince Andrei Alexandrovich of Russia, Russian prince
- Andrei Romanov (footballer) (born 1980), Russian footballer
- Andrey Romanov (racing driver) (born 1979), Russian racecar driver
- Andrei Romanov (swimmer), Soviet swimmer who participated in the 1988 European Junior Swimming Championships
- Andrey Romanov (politician), Bulgarian politician, mayor of Pleven from 1971 to 1979
- Andrei Igorevich Romanov, known as Dyusha Romanov (born 1956), Russian musician, flautist, keyboardist and backing singer of the band Aquarium
- Prince Andrew Romanoff, artist and great-nephew of Nicholas II of Russia
- Andrei Romanov (skier), Russian Paralympian
- Andrei Romanov (wrestler), Moldovan national freestyle wrestling champion
