= Udodov =

Udodov (Russian: Удодов) is a Russian male surname, its feminine counterpart is Udodova. It may refer to

- Ivan Udodov (1924–1981), Russian weightlifter
- Roman Udodov (born 1975), Russian association football official and former player
- Larisa Udodova (born 1973), Olympic freestyle skier from Uzbekistan
