= Demenko =

Demenko (Russian: Деменко; Ukrainian: Деменко) is a surname. Notable people with the surname include:

- Konstantin Demenko, Russian footballer and coach
- Maksim Demenko, Russian footballer and manager
- Oleksandr Demenko (born 1999), Ukrainian soldier and LGBTQ activist
