= Memišević =

Memišević is a Bosnian surname that may refer to:

- Damir Memišević (born 1984), Bosnian football player
- Eldar Memišević (born 1992), Bosnian-born Qatari handball player
- Refik Memišević (1956–2004), Yugoslav wrestler
- Samir Memišević (born 1993), Bosnian football player
- Zinaid Memišević (born 1950), Yugoslav theatre and film actor
