= Murad Ramazanov =

Murad Ramazanov may refer to:

- Murad Ramazanov (wrestler)
- Murad Ramazanov (footballer)
