= Rizvan Utsiyev =

Russian footballer

Rizvan Utsiyev Ризван Уциев
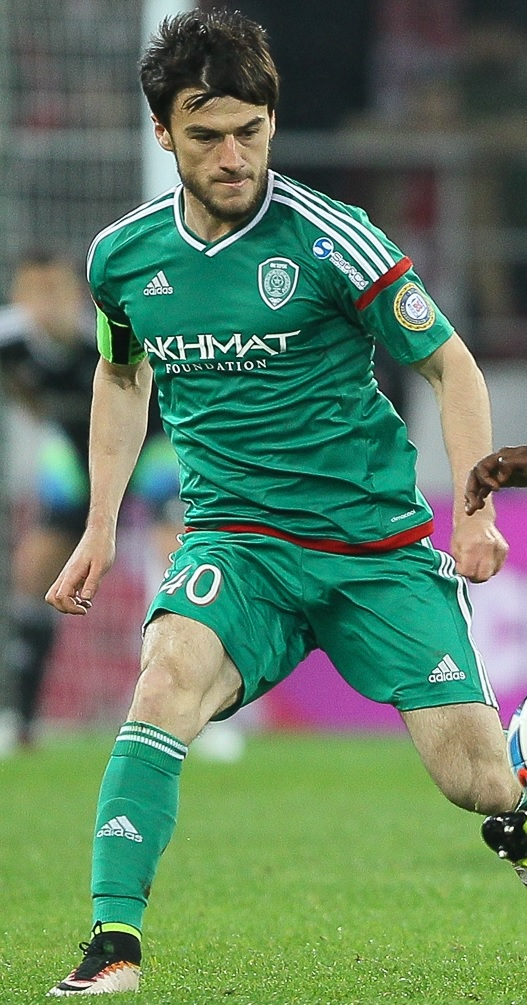
- Utsiyev with FC Terek in 2016

Personal information
- Full name: Rizvan Rashitovich Utsiyev
- Date of birth: 7 February 1988 (age 38)
- Place of birth: Argun, Russian SFSR, Soviet Union
- Height: 1.73 m (5 ft 8 in)
- Position: Right-back

Youth career
- Vaynakh Shali
- 2000–2002: KAMAZ Naberezhnye Chelny
- 2002–2005: Terek Grozny

Senior career*
Years	Team	Apps	(Gls)
2005–2026	Akhmat Grozny	287	(6)
2007	→ Kavkaztransgaz-2005 (loan)	13	(2)

International career
2007	Russia U19	3	(0)
- * Club domestic league appearances and goals as of 13 June 2026

Rizvan Rashitovich Utsiyev (Russian: Ризван Рашитович Уциев; born 7 February 1988) is a Russian former footballer who played as a right-back.

== Career ==
Utsiyev made his professional debut in 2005, coming as a substitute for Terek in the Russian Premier League game against Lokomotiv.

In the second part of 2007 season he was loaned to Russian Second Division's Kavkaztransgaz-2005 alongside his Terek teammate Adlan Katsayev.

== Career statistics ==
=== Club ===
As of match played 17 May 2026

Appearances and goals by club, season and competition
Club	Season	League			Cup		Total	
Club	Season	Division	Apps	Goals	Apps	Goals	Apps	Goals
Akhmat Grozny	2005	Russian Premier League	1	0	0	0	1	0
Akhmat Grozny	2006	Russian First League	7	0	0	0	7	0
Akhmat Grozny	2007	Russian First League	2	0	0	0	2	0
Akhmat Grozny	2008	Russian Premier League	0	0	0	0	0	0
Akhmat Grozny	2009	Russian Premier League	9	0	0	0	9	0
Akhmat Grozny	2010	Russian Premier League	25	2	0	0	25	2
Akhmat Grozny	2011–12	Russian Premier League	18	0	1	0	19	0
Akhmat Grozny	2012–13	Russian Premier League	25	1	3	2	28	3
Akhmat Grozny	2013–14	Russian Premier League	22	0	2	0	24	0
Akhmat Grozny	2014–15	Russian Premier League	24	2	1	0	25	2
Akhmat Grozny	2015–16	Russian Premier League	19	1	2	0	21	1
Akhmat Grozny	2016–17	Russian Premier League	28	0	2	0	30	0
Akhmat Grozny	2017–18	Russian Premier League	27	0	0	0	27	0
Akhmat Grozny	2018–19	Russian Premier League	27	0	1	0	28	0
Akhmat Grozny	2019–20	Russian Premier League	14	0	1	0	15	0
Akhmat Grozny	2020–21	Russian Premier League	1	0	0	0	1	0
Akhmat Grozny	2021–22	Russian Premier League	11	0	1	0	12	0
Akhmat Grozny	2022–23	Russian Premier League	16	0	5	0	21	0
Akhmat Grozny	2023–24	Russian Premier League	9	0	7	0	16	0
Akhmat Grozny	2024–25	Russian Premier League	1	0	8	0	9	0
Akhmat Grozny	2025–26	Russian Premier League	1	0	5	0	6	0
Akhmat Grozny	Total		287	6	39	2	326	8
Kavkaztransgaz (loan)	2007	Russian Second League	13	2	0	0	13	2
Career total			300	8	38	2	338	10
