= Ruslan Surodin =

Russian footballer

Personal information
- Full name: Ruslan Andreyevich Surodin
- Date of birth: 26 October 1982 (age 44)
- Place of birth: Pskov, Russian SFSR
- Height: 1.78 m (5 ft 10 in)
- Position: Midfielder

Senior career*
Years	Team	Apps	(Gls)
2000	FC Pskov	21	(0)
2001–2003	FC Chernomorets Novorossiysk	16	(1)
2003	→ FC Amkar Perm (loan)	13	(0)
2004	FC Chernomorets Novorossiysk	24	(3)
2005	FC Luch-Energiya Vladivostok	17	(1)
2006	FC Volgar-Gazprom Astrakhan	39	(2)
2007–2009	FC Nosta Novotroitsk	90	(5)
2010	FC Tyumen	24	(1)
2011–2012	FC Chernomorets Novorossiysk	36	(1)
2012–2013	FC Luch-Energiya Vladivostok	17	(0)
2013–2014	FC Chernomorets Novorossiysk	24	(0)
2014–2015	FC Dynamo GTS Stavropol	29	(2)
2015–2016	FC Oryol	20	(0)
2016–2020	FC Pskov-747	76	(2)
- * Club domestic league appearances and goals

Ruslan Andreyevich Surodin (Russian: Руслан Андреевич Суродин; born 26 October 1982) is a Russian former professional footballer.

== Club career ==
He made his debut in the Russian Premier League in 2001 for FC Chernomorets Novorossiysk. He played 1 game in the UEFA Cup 2001–02 for FC Chernomorets Novorossiysk.

On 11 April 2009, during a game of Surodin's FC Nosta Novotroitsk against FC Chernomorets Novorossiysk, a Chernomorets fan broke onto the field and ran towards the Nosta's goalkeeper. Surodin punched the fan.
