= Anatoli Sylka =

Russian footballer

Personal information
- Full name: Anatoli Anatolyevich Sylka
- Date of birth: 18 May 1978
- Place of birth: Kursavka, Russian SFSR
- Date of death: 26 April 2009 (aged 30)
- Place of death: Pyatigorsk, Russia
- Height: 1.79 m (5 ft 10 1/2 in)
- Position: Defender

Senior career*
Years	Team	Apps	(Gls)
1998–1999	FC Beshtau Lermontov	49	(1)
2000	FC Spartak-Kavkaztransgaz Izobilny	36	(0)
2001	FC Lada Togliatti	26	(1)
2002	FC Terek Grozny	1	(0)
2003–2009	FC Mashuk-KMV Pyatigorsk	173	(8)
- * Club domestic league appearances and goals

Anatoli Anatolyevich Sylka (Russian: Анатолий Анатольевич Сылка; 18 May 1978 – 26 April 2009) was a Russian professional football player.

== Club career ==
He made his Russian Football National League debut for FC Lada Tolyatti on 1 April 2001 in a game against FC Baltika Kaliningrad.
