= Adlan Katsayev =

Russian footballer

Adlan Katsayev Адлан Кацаев
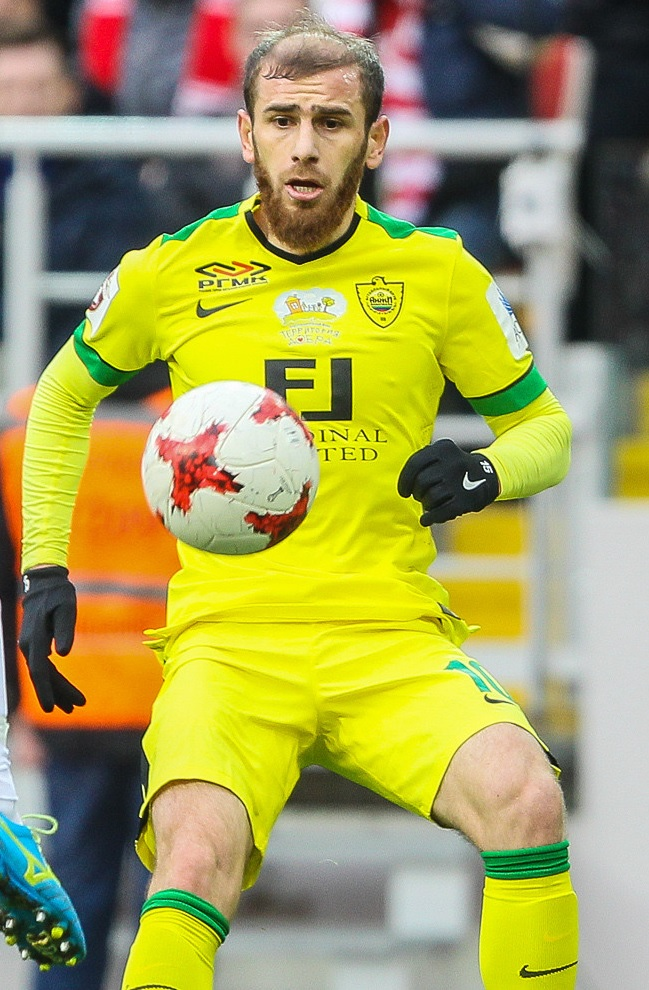
- Katsayev with Anzhi in 2017

Personal information
- Full name: Adlan Zelimkhanovich Katsayev
- Date of birth: 20 February 1988 (age 38)
- Place of birth: Achkhoy-Martan, Russian SFSR
- Height: 1.80 m (5 ft 11 in)
- Position: Midfielder

Youth career
- Terek Grozny

Senior career*
Years	Team	Apps	(Gls)
2005–2018	Akhmat Grozny	72	(1)
2007	→ Kavkaztransgaz-2005 Ryzdvyany (loan)	12	(1)
2013–2014	→ Luch-Energiya Vladivostok (loan)	28	(1)
2014–2015	→ Lechia Gdańsk (loan)	0	(0)
2014–2015	→ Lechia Gdańsk II (loan)	4	(0)
2015	→ Terek-2 Grozny	14	(7)
2016	→ SKA-Khabarovsk (loan)	34	(7)
2017	→ Anzhi Makhachkala (loan)	23	(2)
2018–2019	Anzhi Makhachkala	20	(0)
2019–2020	SKA-Khabarovsk	17	(9)
- * Club domestic league appearances and goals

Adlan Zelimkhanovich Katsayev (Russian: Адлан Зелимханович Кацаев; born 20 February 1988) is a Russian former professional footballer who played as an attacking midfielder.

== Career ==
Katsayev made his professional debut on 19 November 2005, coming as a substitute for Terek in the Russian Premier League game against Tom.

In the second part of 2007 season he was loaned to Russian Second Division's Kavkaztransgaz-2005 alongside his Terek teammate Rizvan Utsiyev.

=== Anzhi Makhachkala ===
In January 2017, Katsayev joined FC Anzhi Makhachkala, extending his loan deal with Anzhi for another year in June 2017. His loan was terminated and he returned to Akhmat on 17 January 2018.

== Career statistics ==
=== Club ===
As of 13 May 2018

Club	Season	League			Cup		Continental		Total	
Club	Season	Division	Apps	Goals	Apps	Goals	Apps	Goals	Apps	Goals
Terek Grozny	2005	Russian Premier League	1	0	0	0	–		1	0
Terek Grozny	2006	FNL	12	0	1	0	–		13	0
Terek Grozny	2007	FNL	2	1	0	0	–		2	1
Kavkaztransgaz-2005	2007	PFL	12	1	–		–		12	1
Terek Grozny	2008	Russian Premier League	0	0	0	0	–		0	0
Terek Grozny	2009	Russian Premier League	11	0	0	0	–		11	0
Terek Grozny	2010	Russian Premier League	18	0	0	0	–		18	0
Terek Grozny	2011–12	Russian Premier League	26	0	2	1	–		28	1
Terek Grozny	2012–13	Russian Premier League	2	0	0	0	–		2	0
Luch-Energiya Vladivostok	2013–14	FNL	28	1	5	1	–		33	2
Lechia II Gdańsk	2014–15	III liga	4	0	–		–		4	0
Terek Grozny	2014–15	Russian Premier League	0	0	0	0	–		0	0
Terek Grozny	2015–16	Russian Premier League	0	0	0	0	–		0	0
Terek-2 Grozny	2015–16	PFL	14	7	–		–		14	7
SKA-Khabarovsk	2015–16	FNL	13	3	–		–		13	3
SKA-Khabarovsk	2016–17	FNL	21	4	2	0	–		23	4
SKA-Khabarovsk	Total		44	7	2	0	0	0	46	7
Anzhi Makhachkala	2016–17	Russian Premier League	10	0	1	0	–		11	0
Anzhi Makhachkala	2017–18	Russian Premier League	13	2	0	0	–		13	2
Anzhi Makhachkala	Total		23	2	1	0	0	0	24	2
Akhmat Grozny	2017–18	Russian Premier League	0	0	–		–		0	0
Akhmat Grozny	Total (4 spells)		72	1	3	1	0	0	75	2
Career total			187	19	11	2	0	0	198	21
