= Grigory Kenkishvili =

Russian footballer

Personal information
- Full name: Grigory Olegovich Kenkishvili
- Date of birth: 18 May 1980 (age 46)
- Place of birth: Ordzhonikidze, Russian SFSR
- Height: 1.78 m (5 ft 10 in)
- Positions: Midfielder; defender

Senior career*
Years	Team	Apps	(Gls)
1998	FC Iriston Vladikavkaz	24	(1)
1999–2000	FC Avtodor Vladikavkaz	8	(0)
2000	FC Spartak-Kavkaztransgaz Izobilny	18	(0)
2001–2002	FC Rostselmash Rostov-on-Don	0	(0)
2003	FC Volgar-Gazprom Astrakhan	12	(0)
2003	FC Alnas Almetyevsk	15	(2)
2004–2006	FC Volgar-Gazprom Astrakhan	95	(7)
2007–2008	FC SKA Rostov-on-Don	72	(6)
2009	FC Baltika Kaliningrad	28	(0)
2010	FC Chernomorets Novorossiysk	29	(1)
2011	FC Torpedo Armavir	13	(0)
2011	FC Salyut Belgorod	8	(0)
2012	FC Olimpia Gelendzhik	7	(0)
- * Club domestic league appearances and goals

Grigory Olegovich Kenkishvili (Russian: Григо́рий Оле́гович Кенкишви́ли; born 18 May 1980) is a former Russian professional association football player.

== Club career ==
He made his Russian Football National League debut for FC Volgar-Gazprom Astrakhan on 29 March 2003 in a game against FC SKA-Energiya Khabarovsk. He played 6 seasons in the FNL for Volgar, SKA-Energiya and FC Baltika Kaliningrad.
