= Aleksei Alemanov =

Russian footballer

Personal information
- Full name: Aleksei Aleksandrovich Alemanov
- Date of birth: 10 October 1977 (age 49)
- Height: 1.78 m (5 ft 10 in)
- Positions: Midfielder; forward

Senior career*
Years	Team	Apps	(Gls)
1996	FC Spartak-Telekom Shuya (D4)		
1996	FC Lokomotiv-d Moscow	19	(1)
1997	FC Spartak-Telekom Shuya (D4)		
1998–2000	FC Spartak-Telekom Shuya	103	(5)
2003–2007	FC Tekstilshchik-Telekom Ivanovo	139	(10)
2007	FC Volga Tver	17	(0)
2008–2009	FC Spartak Kostroma	64	(0)
2010	FC Tekstilshchik Ivanovo	28	(1)
- * Club domestic league appearances and goals

Aleksei Aleksandrovich Alemanov (Russian: Алексей Александрович Алеманов; born 10 October 1977) is a former Russian professional football player.

== Club career ==
He played in the Russian Football National League for FC Tekstilshchik-Telekom Ivanovo in 2007.
