= Oleg Musin =

Kazakhstani footballer

Personal information
- Full name: Oleg Vladimirovich Musin
- Date of birth: 12 January 1975 (age 51)
- Place of birth: Gorno-Altaysk, Russian SFSR
- Height: 1.74 m (5 ft 8 1/2 in)
- Position: Defender

Senior career*
Years	Team	Apps	(Gls)
1991–1992	FC Dinamo Barnaul	9	(0)
1992–1993	FC Metallurg Novokuznetsk	31	(1)
1994–1997	FC Zarya Leninsk-Kuznetsky	129	(0)
1998	FC Metallurg Lipetsk	14	(0)
1998–2003	FC Sokol Saratov	106	(0)
2004	FC Kairat	11	(0)
2005	FC Dynamo Bryansk	20	(1)
2006	FC Aktobe		
2007	FC SKA-Energia Khabarovsk	7	(0)
2007	FC Vityaz Podolsk	3	(0)
2008	FC MVD Rossii Moscow	30	(1)
2009	FC Dmitrov	23	(0)
2010	FC Mostovik-Primorye Ussuriysk	13	(0)

International career
2003–2004	Kazakhstan	6	(0)
- * Club domestic league appearances and goals

Oleg Vladimirovich Musin (Russian: Олег Владимирович Мусин; born 12 January 1975) is a Kazakhstani former professional footballer. He also holds Russian citizenship.

== Club career ==
Musin made his debut in the Russian Premier League in 2001 for FC Sokol Saratov.

== Honours ==
- Kazakhstan Premier League runner-up: 2006.
