= Sergei Stepanenko =

Kazakhstani-Russian footballer

Personal information
- Full name: Sergei Anatolyevich Stepanenko
- Date of birth: 25 January 1981 (age 45)
- Place of birth: Moskovskoye, Stavropol Krai, Russian SFSR
- Height: 1.88 m (6 ft 2 in)
- Position: Goalkeeper

Senior career*
Years	Team	Apps	(Gls)
1997	Dynamo Stavropol	10	(0)
1998	→ Dynamo-d Stavropol (loan)	0	(0)
1999	Beshtau Lermontov	25	(0)
2000	Dynamo Stavropol	1	(0)
2000	Biokhimik-Mordovia Saransk	2	(0)
2001–2002	Spartak-Kavkaztransgaz Izobilny	66	(0)
2003	Terek Grozny	0	(0)
2004–2006	Taraz	51	(0)
2007	Terek Grozny	1	(0)
2008	Kairat	8	(0)
2009–2010	Stavropol	21	(0)
2010–2013	Zhetysu	56	(0)
- * Club domestic league appearances and goals

Sergei Anatolyevich Stepanenko (Russian: Серге́й Анатольевич Степаненко; born 25 January 1981) is a former Kazakh-Russian professional footballer.

== Club career ==
He played in the Russian Football National League for FC Terek Grozny in 2007.
