= Viktor Shkurat =

Russian footballer

Personal information
- Full name: Viktor Yevgenyevich Shkurat
- Date of birth: 20 August 1984 (age 42)
- Place of birth: Rostov-on-Don, Russian SFSR
- Height: 1.80 m (5 ft 11 in)
- Positions: Forward; midfielder

Youth career
- Rostselmash Rostov-on-Don

Senior career*
Years	Team	Apps	(Gls)
2000	Rostselmash-3 Rostov-on-Don		
2001–2005	Rostov	0	(0)
2005	Mordovia Saransk	5	(0)
2006–2008	SKA Rostov-on-Don	59	(3)
2009	MVD Rossii Moscow	6	(0)
2009–2010	SKA Rostov-on-Don	38	(2)
2011–2012	Tyumen	20	(0)
2013	Elektron Rostov-on-Don		
2014	MITOS Novocherkassk	2	(0)
2015–2016	Rostselmash Rostov-on-Don (amateur)		
2017–2019	Akademiya Futbola-M Rostov-on-Don		

Managerial career
- 2023: Chayka (U16)
- 2024: Chayka (youth)
- 2025–2026: Chayka-M
- * Club domestic league appearances and goals

Viktor Yevgenyevich Shkurat (Russian: Виктор Евгеньевич Шкурат; born 20 August 1984) is a Russian professional football coach and a former player.

== Club career ==
He made his debut for Rostov on 13 July 2005 in a Russian Cup game against Luch-Energiya Vladivostok.

He played 3 seasons in the Russian Football National League for SKA Rostov-on-Don and MVD Rossii Moscow.
