= Miodrag Stefanović (footballer, born 1977) =

Serbian footballer

Personal information
- Full name: Miodrag Stefanović
- Date of birth: February 2, 1977 (age 49)
- Place of birth: Belgrade, SFR Yugoslavia
- Height: 1.80 m (5 ft 11 in)
- Position: Right back

Team information
- Current team: PAOK FC (scout)

Senior career*
Years	Team	Apps	(Gls)
1997–2002	Radnički Beograd	111	(1)
2002	Altay	0	(0)
2003-2004	Rad	15+	(0+)
2004–2006	Slavija Sarajevo	68	(11)
2007–2008	SKA Rostov	66	(3)
2009	Metallurg Lipetsk	23	(3)
2010–2011	Sloga Kraljevo		
- * Club domestic league appearances and goals

Miodrag Stefanović (Serbian Cyrillic: Миодраг Стефановић; born February 2, 1977) is a Serbian former footballer, who currently is a scout for PAOK FC.

== Career ==
In 2007, he moved from FK Slavija Sarajevo to FC SKA Rostov-on-Don. In 2008, he scored a goal in a game against FC Dynamo Bryansk. Before, he has played with Serbian clubs FK Radnički Beograd and FK Rad, with a short 6 months spell in Turkey with Altay.
