= FC MVD Rossii Moscow =

Russian association football club

FC MVD Rossii
- Full name: Football Club MVD Rossii Moscow
- Founded: 2007
- Dissolved: 2012
- Ground: Avangard, Domodedovo
- Chairman: Sergei Lopatin
- League: ?
- 2009: withdrew from Russian First Division
Home colours	Away colours

FC MVD Rossii (Russian: ФК МВД России Москва) is a Russian football club from Moscow, founded in 2007. It represents the Russian Ministry of Internal Affairs. Historically the ministry was represented by FC Dynamo Moscow, but Dynamo is now not directly dependent on MVD. Still, several players on the 2008 FC MVD roster played for Dynamo or its youth teams in the past. In 2008, FC MVD won the West zone of the Russian Second Division and advanced to the Russian First Division. On July 17, 2009, the team resigned from the Russian First Division (due to financial strait) after playing 19 games.

In 2007 the team was called FC MUVD na VVT Moscow.

Among the club's head coaches were Yuri Kovtun (2008–2009) and Vladimir Eshtrekov (2009).

== Notable players ==
Had international caps for their respective countries. Players whose name is listed in bold represented their countries while playing for MVD Rossii.

USSR/Russia

- (Russia) Lyubomir Kantonistov
- (Russia) Aleksandr Shirko

Former USSR countries

- (Kazakhstan) Oleg Musin
- (Armenia) Albert Sarkisyan
