= Nikolai Kildishev =

Russian footballer

Personal information
- Full name: Nikolai Sergeyevich Kildishev
- Date of birth: 2 December 1982 (age 43)
- Height: 1.86 m (6 ft 1 in)
- Positions: Defender; midfielder

Youth career
- Volga Saratov
- FC Sokol Saratov

Senior career*
Years	Team	Apps	(Gls)
1999–2000	FC Sokol-D Saratov		
2001–2002	FC Sokol Saratov	0	(0)
2003–2004	FC Iskra Engels	66	(11)
2005	FC Nosta Novotroitsk	28	(1)
2006–2007	FC Metallurg-Kuzbass Novokuznetsk	54	(2)
2008–2010	FC Sokol Saratov	87	(13)
- * Club domestic league appearances and goals

Nikolai Sergeyevich Kildishev (Russian: Николай Серге́евич Кильдишев; born 2 December 1982) is a former Russian professional football player.

== Club career ==
He played in the Russian Football National League for FC Metallurg-Kuzbass Novokuznetsk in 2007.
