= Stanislav Kharitonov =

Russian footballer

Personal information
- Full name: Stanislav Igorevich Kharitonov
- Date of birth: 12 April 1980 (age 46)
- Height: 1.84 m (6 ft 1/2 in)
- Positions: Midfielder; forward

Senior career*
Years	Team	Apps	(Gls)
2001–2005	FC Amur Blagoveshchensk	108	(7)
2006–2008	FC Metallurg-Kuzbass Novokuznetsk	99	(15)
2009	FC Amur Blagoveshchensk	18	(0)
2010	FC Mostovik-Primorye Ussuriysk	8	(0)
2010	FC Amur-2010 Blagoveshchensk (D4)		
2011	FC Amur-2010 Blagoveshchensk	19	(1)
- * Club domestic league appearances and goals

Stanislav Igorevich Kharitonov (Russian: Станислав Игоревич Харитонов; born 12 April 1980) is a former Russian professional football player.

== Club career ==
He played 3 seasons in the Russian Football National League for FC Amur Blagoveshchensk and FC Metallurg-Kuzbass Novokuznetsk.
