= Wýaçeslaw Krendelew =

Russian-Turkmenistani footballer

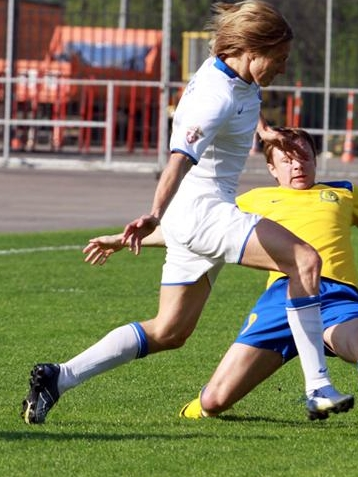
- Wýaçeslaw Krendelew at FC Baltika

Personal information
- Full name: Wýaçeslaw Nikolaýewiç Krendelew
- Date of birth: 24 July 1982 (age 44)
- Place of birth: Ashgabat, Turkmen SSR
- Height: 1.84 m (6 ft 0 in)
- Positions: Attacking midfielder; forward

Team information
- Current team: ZFK CSKA Moscow (fitness coach)

Senior career*
Years	Team	Apps	(Gls)
2000–2002	Galkan Asgabat	51	(11)
2003	Nisa Asgabat	17	(8)
2004–2006	FC Taraz	79	(12)
2007	FC Terek Grozny	36	(3)
2008–2009	FC Amkar Perm	0	(0)
2009	→ FC Metallurg Lipetsk (loan)	33	(5)
2010	FC Baltika Kaliningrad	36	(1)
2011–2012	FC Luch-Energiya Vladivostok	41	(0)
2012–2013	FC SKA-Energiya Khabarovsk	33	(2)
2013–2016	FC Luch-Energiya Vladivostok	60	(2)

International career^{‡}
2004–2011	Turkmenistan	15	(2)

Managerial career
- 2018–2024: FC Strogino Moscow (fitness coach)
- 2025–: ZFK CSKA Moscow (fitness coach)
- * Club domestic league appearances and goals as of 30 October 2026 ‡ National team caps and goals as of 30 October 2026

Wýaçeslaw Nikolaýewiç Krendelew (Russian: Вячесла́в Никола́евич Кренделёв; born 24 July 1982) is a former Turkmenistani footballer who currently coaches at ZFK CSKA Moscow.

== Career ==
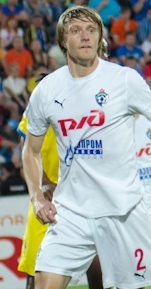
Wýaçeslaw Krendelew at SKA-Energia

He began his career in 2000 with FC Galkan. In 2003, he moved to Nisa Aşgabat, winning the Turkmenistan Higher League title with the club.

Between 2004 and 2006, he played for Kazakhstani side FC Taraz, winning the Kazakhstan Cup during his stint.

In January 2007, he signed with Terek Grozny, helping the team finish as runners-up in the Russian First Division.

Krendelew signed for the Russian Premier League outfit FC Amkar Perm in 2008, but failed to break into the first team and spent the whole season playing for the reserves. He was loaned to Russian First Division's FC Metallurg Lipetsk in the following year.

In 2010, he moved to Baltika. On 13 February 2011, he signed a contract with Luch-Energia. During the 2012–13 season, he played for SKA-Energia. On 17 July 2013, he returned to Luch-Energia. In February 2015, he suffered a serious injury and was sidelined for six months. In June 2015, he extended his contract with the Vladivostok club for another season, after which he retired from professional football.

== International career ==
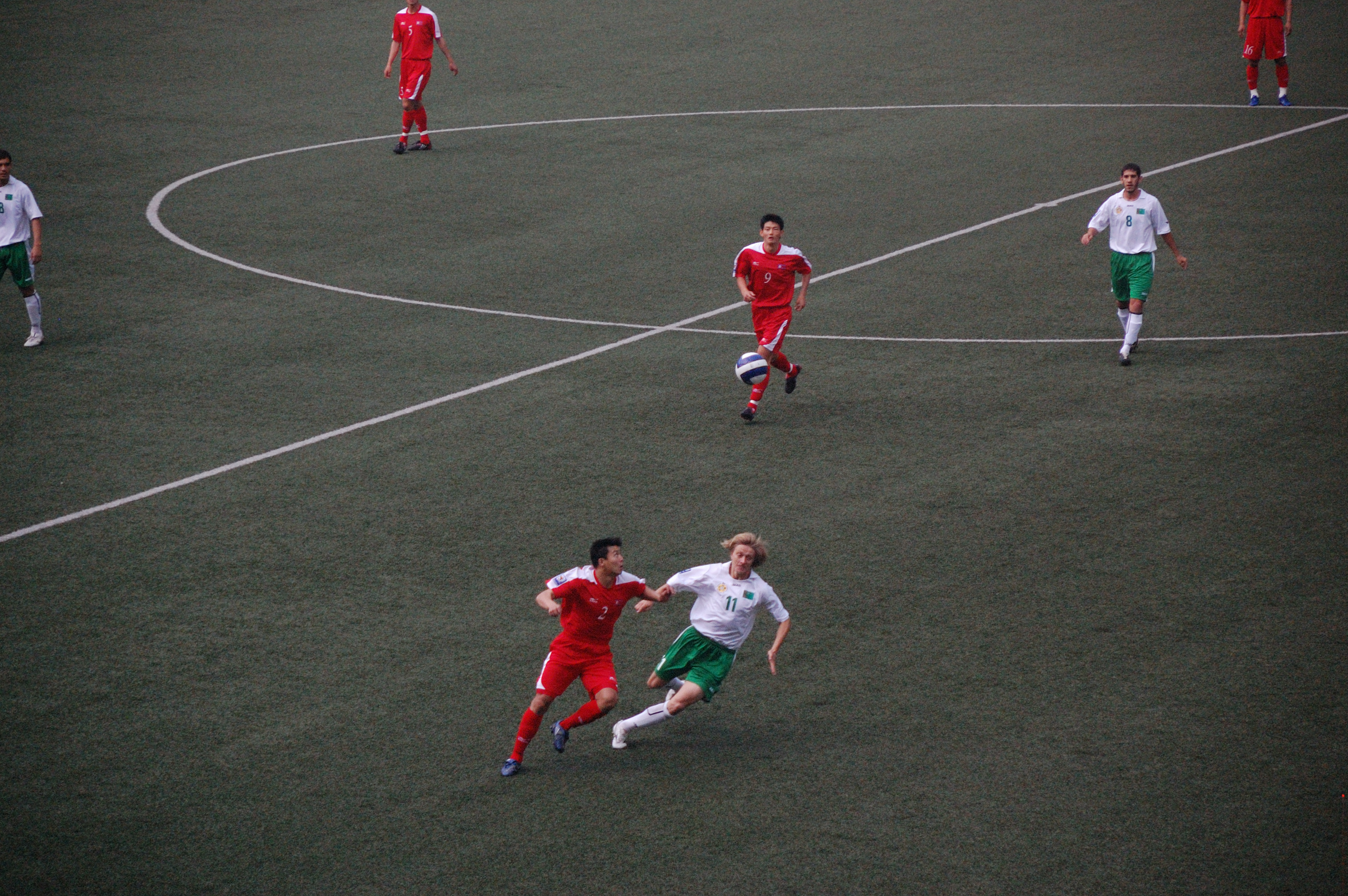
Krendelew №11. Qualification for the 2010 FIFA World Cup

Between 2004 and 2011, he represented the Turkmenistan national team. He was part of the squad during the final tournament of the 2004 AFC Asian Cup. In August 2008, he scored his first international goal in a 5–0 victory against Afghanistan during the 2008 AFC Challenge Cup. On 23 July 2011, he scored his second goal for Turkmenistan in a 1–1 draw against Indonesia during the 2014 FIFA World Cup qualification.

== Coaching career ==
Between 2018 and 2024, he served as a fitness coach for FC Strogino Moscow. Since 2025, he has held the same position at the women's team CSKA Moscow.

== Career statistics ==
=== Club ===
As of match played 21 May 2016

Appearances and goals by club, season and competition
Club	Season	League			National Cup		Continental		Other		Total	
Club	Season	Division	Apps	Goals	Apps	Goals	Apps	Goals	Apps	Goals	Apps	Goals
Galkan Asgabat	2000	Ýokary Liga					–		–			
Galkan Asgabat	2001	Ýokary Liga					–		–			
Galkan Asgabat	2002	Ýokary Liga					–		–			
Galkan Asgabat	Total						-	-	-	-		
Nisa Aşgabat	2003	Ýokary Liga	17	8			–		–		17	8
Taraz	2004	Kazakhstan Premier League	26	0			–		–		26	0
Taraz	2005	Kazakhstan Premier League	28	4			–		–		28	4
Taraz	2006	Kazakhstan Premier League	25	8			–		–		25	8
Taraz	Total		79	12			-	-	-	-	79	12
Terek Grozny	2007	Russian Premier League	36	3			–		–		36	3
Amkar Perm	2008	Russian Premier League	0	0			–		–		0	0
Amkar Perm	2009	Russian Premier League	0	0			–		–		0	0
Amkar Perm	Total		0	0			-	-	-	-		
Metallurg Lipetsk (loan)	2009	Russian First Division	33	5			–		–		35	5
Baltika Kaliningrad	2010	Russian First Division	36	1	1	0	–		–		37	1
Luch-Energiya Vladivostok	2011–12	Football National League	41	0	3	2	–		–		44	2
SKA-Energiya Khabarovsk	2012–13	Football National League	29	2	2	1	–		2	0	33	3
SKA-Energiya Khabarovsk	2013–14	Football National League	2	0	0	0	–		–		2	0
SKA-Energiya Khabarovsk	Total		31	2	2	1	-	-	2	0	35	3
Luch-Energiya Vladivostok	2013–14	Football National League	22	2	2	0	–		–		24	2
Luch-Energiya Vladivostok	2014–15	Football National League	13	0	0	0	–		–		13	0
Luch-Energiya Vladivostok	2015–16	Football National League	26	0	0	0	–		–		26	0
Luch-Energiya Vladivostok	Total		61	2	2	0	-	-	-	-	63	2
Career total			334	33	8+	1+	-	-	2	0	344+	34+

=== International ===
Appearances and goals by national team and year
National team	Year	Apps	Goals
Turkmenistan	2004	3	0
Turkmenistan	2005	–	
Turkmenistan	2006	–	
Turkmenistan	2007	2	0
Turkmenistan	2008	9	1
Turkmenistan	2009	–	
Turkmenistan	2010	–	
Turkmenistan	2011	1	1
Total		15	2

Scores and results list Turkmenistan's goal tally first, score column indicates score after each Krendelew goal.

List of international goals scored by Wýaçeslaw Krendelew
No.	Date	Venue	Opponent	Score	Result	Competition
1	1 August 2008	G. M. C. Balayogi Athletic Stadium, Hyderabad, India	Afghanistan	2–0	5–0	2008 AFC Challenge Cup
2	23 July 2011	Saparmurat Turkmenbashy Olympic Stadium, Ashgabat, Turkmenistan	Indonesia	1–0	1–1	2014 FIFA World Cup qualification

== Honours ==
- Turkmenistan Champion: 2003
- Turkmenistan Cup runner-up: 2003
- Kazakhstan Cup winner: 2004
- Russian First Division runner-up: 2007
- FNL Cup winner: 2014

== Personal life ==
He was born in Ashkhabad. He began training at a sports school at the age of five, brought there by his father, who had played briefly for Kopetdag; his mother is an electrical engineer. His parents reside in Turkmenistan. He is married, with the wedding having taken place in March 2009.
