= Alan Kardek =

Brazilian footballer (born 1980)

Personal information
- Full name: Alan Kardek de Souza
- Date of birth: 22 February 1980 (age 46)
- Height: 1.88 m (6 ft 2 in)
- Position: Defender

Senior career*
Years	Team	Apps	(Gls)
2007–2008	Villa Rio		
2007	→ Alania (loan)	19	(0)
2008	Alania	2	(0)
2009	Mesquita		
2009	Miguel Couto		
2010–	São Cristóvão		
- * Club domestic league appearances and goals as of 19:33, 26 May 2010 (UTC)

Alan Kardek de Souza (born 22 February 1980), commonly known as Alan Kardek, is a Brazilian football defender. He currently plays for São Cristóvão.

== Career ==
In 2007 and 2008 Alan Kardek appeared in a total of 21 Russian First Division games for Alania.

Kardek has since returned to Brazil to play for likes of Mesquita and São Cristóvão.
