= Aleksandr Zakhlestin =

Russian footballer

Personal information
- Full name: Aleksandr Sergeyevich Zakhlestin
- Date of birth: 7 July 1979 (age 47)
- Place of birth: Kirov, Russian SFSR
- Height: 1.80 m (5 ft 11 in)
- Position: Defender

Youth career
- Shinnik Kirov

Senior career*
| Years | Team | Apps | (Gls) |
| 1999–2005 | FC Dynamo Kirov | 215 | (27) |
| 2006–2007 | FC Sodovik Sterlitamak | 56 | (1) |
| 2008 | FC Volga Ulyanovsk | 22 | (1) |
| 2009 | FC Sokol-Saratov | 29 | (2) |
| 2010 | FC Dynamo Kirov | 25 | (0) |
| 2011–2014 | FC Chelyabinsk | 82 | (0) |
| 2014–2017 | FC Dynamo Kirov | 67 | (1) |
- * Club domestic league appearances and goals

Aleksandr Sergeyevich Zakhlestin (Russian: Александр Серге́евич Захлестин; born 7 July 1979) is a former Russian professional football player.

== Club career ==
He played 3 seasons in the Russian Football National League for FC Sodovik Sterlitamak and FC Volga Ulyanovsk.
