= Konstantin Sukhoverkhov =

Russian footballer

Personal information
- Full name: Konstantin Yuryevich Sukhoverkhov
- Date of birth: 27 December 1987 (age 38)
- Height: 1.72 m (5 ft 7 1/2 in)
- Position: Forward

Senior career*
Years	Team	Apps	(Gls)
2003–2005	FC Birobidzhan		
2006	FC SKA-Energiya-2 Khabarovsk		
2007–2011	FC SKA-Energiya Khabarovsk	81	(13)
2011–2012	FC Smena Komsomolsk-na-Amure	9	(1)
2013–2014	FC Belogorsk		
- * Club domestic league appearances and goals

Konstantin Yuryevich Sukhoverkhov (Russian: Константин Юрьевич Суховерхов; born 27 December 1987) is a former Russian professional football player.

== Club career ==
He played 5 seasons in the Russian Football National League for FC SKA-Energiya Khabarovsk.
