= Taras Shelest =

Russian footballer

Personal information
- Full name: Taras Anatolyevich Shelest
- Date of birth: 3 February 1980 (age 46)
- Height: 1.79 m (5 ft 10 1/2 in)
- Position: Midfielder

Senior career*
Years	Team	Apps	(Gls)
1998–2000	FC Spartak-Chukotka Moscow	41	(2)
2000	FC Metallurg Krasnoyarsk	9	(0)
2001	FK Liepājas Metalurgs	27	(0)
2002	FC Tom Tomsk	1	(0)
2002	FC Kuzbass-Dynamo Kemerovo	4	(1)
2003–2005	FC Oryol	110	(6)
2006–2007	FC Terek Grozny	29	(0)
2008	FC SKA-Energiya Khabarovsk	6	(0)
- * Club domestic league appearances and goals

Taras Anatolyevich Shelest (Russian: Тарас Анатольевич Шелест; born 3 February 1980) is a former Russian professional footballer.

== Club career ==
He made his Russian Football National League debut for FC Spartak-Chukotka Moscow on 1 July 2000 in a game against FC Rubin Kazan.

== Personal life ==
He is a son of the manager Anatoli Shelest.
