= Dmitri Gusak =

Russian footballer

Personal information
- Full name: Dmitri Vladimirovich Gusak
- Date of birth: 1 July 1985 (age 41)
- Height: 1.80 m (5 ft 11 in)
- Position: Midfielder

Youth career
- FShM-Torpedo Moscow
- PFC CSKA Moscow

Senior career*
Years	Team	Apps	(Gls)
2003–2005	FC Petrotrest St. Petersburg	57	(2)
2006	FC Volga Nizhny Novgorod	24	(2)
2007	FC Dynamo Bryansk	11	(0)
2007	PS Kemi Kings	8	(0)
2008–2009	FC Sportakademklub Moscow	35	(1)
- * Club domestic league appearances and goals

Dmitri Vladimirovich Gusak (Russian: Дмитрий Владимирович Гусак; born 1 July 1985) is a former Russian professional footballer.

== Club career ==
He played three seasons in the Russian Football National League for FC Petrotrest St. Petersburg, FC Dynamo Bryansk and FC Sportakademklub Moscow.
