= Paata Jincharadze =

Georgian footballer

Personal information
- Full name: Paata Jincharadze
- Date of birth: 21 December 1974 (age 51)
- Place of birth: Kutaisi, Georgian SSR
- Height: 1.86 m (6 ft 1 in)
- Position: Midfielder

Youth career
- 1992–1994: Krtsanisi Tbilisi

Senior career*
Years	Team	Apps	(Gls)
1994–1996	Morkinali Tbilisi	54	(20)
1996–1997	APEP Pitsilia	24	(3)
1997–1998	Ethnikos Assia	19	(3)
1999	Torpedo Kutaisi	7	(0)
1999–2000	Dinamo Tbilisi	44	(2)
2001	Torpedo Kutaisi	9	(1)
2001	Sokol Saratov	0	(0)
2002–2003	Lokomotiv Chita	66	(13)
2004	Neftekhimik Nizhnekamsk	31	(5)
2005–2010	Dynamo Bryansk	183	(6)
- * Club domestic league appearances and goals

Paata Jincharadze (Russian: Паата Зауриевич Джинчарадзе; born 21 December 1974) is a retired Georgian footballer. He also holds Russian citizenship.
