= Andrei Romanov (footballer) =

Russian footballer

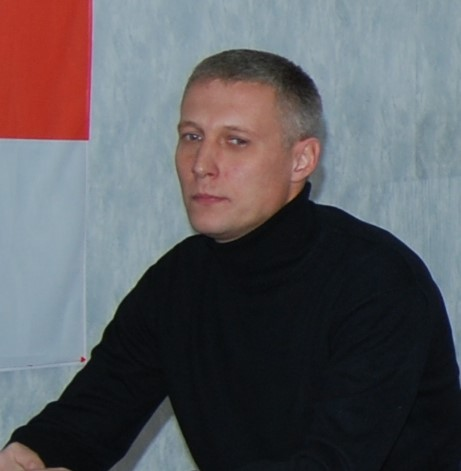

Personal information
- Full name: Andrei Aleksandrovich Romanov
- Date of birth: 4 August 1980 (age 46)
- Place of birth: Ivanovo, Russian SFSR
- Height: 1.84 m (6 ft 0 in)
- Position: Goalkeeper

Senior career*
Years	Team	Apps	(Gls)
1997–1998	FC Tekstilshchik Ivanovo	29	(0)
1999–2002	FC Oryol	28	(0)
2003	FC Spartak-Telekom Shuya	20	(0)
2004–2007	FC Tekstilshchik-Telekom Ivanovo	89	(0)
2008–2010	FC Spartak Kostroma	99	(0)
2011–2012	FC Shinnik Yaroslavl	0	(0)
2011–2012	→ FC Spartak Kostroma (loan)	23	(0)
2012–2018	FC Tekstilshchik Ivanovo	108	(0)
- * Club domestic league appearances and goals

Andrei Aleksandrovich Romanov (Russian: Андрей Александрович Романов; born 4 August 1980) is a former Russian professional football player.

== Club career ==
He played in the Russian Football National League for FC Tekstilshchik-Telekom Ivanovo in 2007.

== Honours ==
- Russian Second Division, Zone West best goalkeeper: 2009, 2010.
