= Albert Sarkisyan =

Armenian footballer (born 1975)

Personal information
- Date of birth: 15 May 1975 (age 51)
- Place of birth: Nalchik, Soviet Union
- Height: 1.82 m (6 ft 0 in)
- Position: Midfielder

Team information
- Current team: Strogino Moscow (U16 manager)

Senior career*
Years	Team	Apps	(Gls)
1992–1997	Spartak Nalchik	119	(25)
1997–2001	Lokomotiv Moscow	87	(8)
2002–2002	Torpedo Moscow	17	(1)
2002–2003	Arsenal Kyiv	11	(1)
2003–2004	Alania Vladikavkaz	22	(3)
2005–2006	Amkar Perm	39	(1)
2007	Terek Grozny	10	(0)
2008	Nika Moscow	6	(0)
2008–2009	MVD Rossii Moscow	23	(8)
2009	Atyrau	8	(1)
2010	Lokomotiv-2 Moscow	17	(1)

International career
1997–2005	Armenia	33	(3)

Managerial career
- 2022–: Strogino Moscow (U16)
- * Club domestic league appearances and goals

Albert Sarkisyan (Armenian: Ալբերտ Սարգսյան, born 15 May 1975) is an Armenian football coach and a former player who is the head coach of the Under-16 team of Strogino Moscow.

== Career ==
In January 2002, Sarkisyan was training with Scottish club Livingston but was not offered a permanent contract.

== International career ==
A midfielder, Sarkisyan was a member of the Armenia national team, participating in 33 international matches and scoring 3 goals after his debut in away 1998 FIFA World Cup qualification match against Ukraine, on 5 May 1997.

== Career statistics ==
Appearances and goals by national team and year
National team	Year	Apps	Goals
Armenia	1997	5	0
Armenia	1998	3	0
Armenia	1999	6	0
Armenia	2000	1	0
Armenia	2001	5	0
Armenia	2002	3	1
Armenia	2003	5	2
Armenia	2004	4	0
Armenia	2005	1	0
Total		33	3

Scores and results list Armenia's goal tally first, score column indicates score after each Sarkisyan goal.

List of international goals scored by Albert Sarkisyan
No.	Date	Venue	Opponent	Score	Result	Competition
1	7 September 2002	Armenia	Ukraine		2–2	UEFA Euro 2004 qualifying
2	7 June 2003	Ukraine	Ukraine		3–4	UEFA Euro 2004 qualifying
3	7 June 2003	Ukraine	Ukraine		3–4	UEFA Euro 2004 qualifying

== Honours ==
Atyrau

- Kazakhstan Cup: 2009
