= Marat Galimov =

Russian footballer and referee

Personal information
- Full name: Marat Gainelyanovich Galimov
- Date of birth: 29 January 1964 (age 62)
- Place of birth: Sverdlovsk, Russian SFSR
- Height: 1.80 m (5 ft 11 in)
- Positions: Defender; midfielder

Youth career
- FC Uralmash Sverdlovsk

Senior career*
Years	Team	Apps	(Gls)
1983–1984	FC Uralmash Sverdlovsk	20	(1)
1984	FC Avangard Petropavlovsk	19	(2)
1985	FC Torpedo Kokshetau	37	(15)
1986	FC Kairat	0	(0)
1986	FC Spartak Semipalatinsk	27	(4)
1987–1995	FC Uralmash Yekaterinburg	265	(15)
- * Club domestic league appearances and goals

Marat Gainelyanovich Galimov (Russian: Марат Гаинельянович Галимов; born 29 January 1964) is a Russian former professional football referee and a player.

== Club career ==
As a player, he made his professional debut in the Soviet Second League in 1983 for FC Uralmash Sverdlovsk.

== Referee career ==
He worked as a referee from 1996 to 2007, including nine games in the Russian Premier League in 2001 and 2003.
