= Anton Gudukin =

Russian footballer

Personal information
- Full name: Anton Vladimirovich Gudukin
- Date of birth: 12 November 1982 (age 43)
- Place of birth: Belaya Kalitva, Russian SFSR
- Height: 1.90 m (6 ft 3 in)
- Position: Defender

Youth career
- DYuSSh Belaya Kalitva
- 1996–1998: FC Nika Krasny Sulin
- RO UOR Rostov-on-Don

Senior career*
Years	Team	Apps	(Gls)
1999	FC Rostselmash-3 Rostov-on-Don		
2000	FC Rostselmash-2 Rostov-on-Don	31	(2)
2001	FC Slavyansk Slavyansk-na-Kubani	10	(0)
2001	FC Diana Otradovka		
2001–2002	FC Rostovnefteprodukt Salsk		
2002	FC Mayak Rostov-on-Don		
2003–2011	FC KAMAZ Naberezhnye Chelny	189	(20)
2012–2013	FC Kalitva Belaya Kalitva		
2013	FC Taganrog	6	(1)
2014	FC TPF Novoprimorsky		
2014	FC Kalitva Belaya Kalitva		
2015	FC Shakhtyor-2014 Shakhty		
2016–2019	FC Kalitva Belaya Kalitva		
- * Club domestic league appearances and goals

Anton Vladimirovich Gudukin (Russian: Антон Владимирович Гудукин; born 12 November 1982) is a Russian former professional footballer.

== Club career ==
He played 8 seasons in the Russian Football National League for FC KAMAZ Naberezhnye Chelny.
