= Aleksei Serebryakov (footballer) =

Russian footballer

Personal information
- Full name: Aleksei Valeryevich Serebryakov
- Date of birth: 10 July 1976 (age 50)
- Height: 1.80 m (5 ft 11 in)
- Positions: Defender; midfielder

Youth career
- DYuSSh-11 Volgograd

Senior career*
Years	Team	Apps	(Gls)
1998–1999	FC Zheleznodorozhnik Volgograd		
2000–2003	FC Energetik Uren	123	(4)
2004–2006	FC Olimpia Volgograd	80	(5)
2007	FC Sodovik Sterlitamak	37	(0)
2008	FC Olimpia Volgograd	32	(3)
2009	FC Volgograd	31	(0)
2010–2012	FC Sakhalin Yuzhno-Sakhalinsk	58	(1)
2012	FC Olimpia Volgograd	7	(0)
2012–2013	FC Sakhalin Yuzhno-Sakhalinsk	21	(4)
2013–2014	FC Sibiryak Bratsk	16	(2)
2014–2016	FC Nogliki		
2016	FC Urozhay Yelan		
2017	FC Sakhalin Yuzhno-Sakhalinsk	7	(1)
- * Club domestic league appearances and goals

Aleksei Valeryevich Serebryakov (Russian: Алексей Валерьевич Серебряков; born 10 July 1976) is a former Russian professional football player.

== Club career ==
He played in the Russian Football National League for FC Sodovik Sterlitamak in 2007.
