= Sergei Butyrin =

Russian professional football player

Personal information
- Full name: Sergei Aleksandrovich Butyrin
- Date of birth: 1 April 1987 (age 39)
- Place of birth: Belgorod, Russian SFSR
- Height: 1.80 m (5 ft 11 in)
- Position: Defender

Senior career*
Years	Team	Apps	(Gls)
2005–2006	FC Salyut-Energia Belgorod	4	(0)
2006	FC Gubkin	15	(1)
2007–2013	FC Salyut Belgorod	118	(6)
2014–2015	FC Fakel Voronezh	20	(0)
2015–2018	FC Energomash Belgorod	61	(4)
2018	FC Chayka Peschanokopskoye	11	(0)
2019–2020	FC Salyut Belgorod	21	(3)
- * Club domestic league appearances and goals

Sergei Aleksandrovich Butyrin (Russian: Серге́й Александрович Бутырин; born 1 April 1987) is a Russian former professional football player.

== Club career ==
He made his Russian Football National League debut for FC Salyut-Energiya Belgorod on 8 April 2006 in a game against FC SKA-Energiya Khabarovsk.
