= Aleksei Kolomiychenko =

Russian footballer

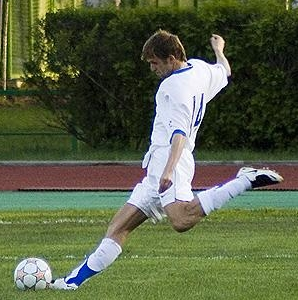
- Kolomiychenko in 2008

Personal information
- Full name: Aleksei Yuryevich Kolomiychenko
- Date of birth: 12 July 1982 (age 44)
- Place of birth: Yartsevo, Russian SFSR
- Height: 1.84 m (6 ft 1/2 in)
- Position: Midfielder

Senior career*
Years	Team	Apps	(Gls)
2001	FC Oazis Yartsevo	1	(0)
2002	FC Biokhimik-Mordovia Saransk	30	(9)
2003	FC Kristall Smolensk	20	(0)
2003–2004	FC Khimki	55	(3)
2005	FC Anzhi Makhachkala	16	(0)
2005–2007	FC Avangard Kursk	93	(4)
2008–2009	FC Baltika Kaliningrad	63	(4)
2010	FC Avangard Kursk	29	(2)
2011–2016	FC Volgar Astrakhan	141	(11)
2016–2019	FC Krasny-SGAFKST Smolensk		
2019	FC Dnepr Kholm-Zhirkovsky		
- * Club domestic league appearances and goals

Aleksei Yuryevich Kolomiychenko (Russian: Алексей Юрьевич Коломийченко; born 12 July 1982) is a Russian former professional football player.

== Club career ==
He made his Russian Football National League debut for FC Kristall Smolensk on 29 March 2003 in a game against FC Lada-Tolyatti. Overall, he played 12 seasons in the FNL for 6 clubs.
