= Andrei Fedkov =

Russian footballer

Personal information
- Full name: Andrei Yuryevich Fedkov
- Date of birth: 4 July 1971 (age 55)
- Place of birth: Rostov-on-Don, Russian SFSR
- Height: 1.82 m (6 ft 0 in)
- Position: Forward

Youth career
- FC SKA Rostov-on-Don
- RO UOR Rostov-on-Don

Senior career*
Years	Team	Apps	(Gls)
1988	Rostselmash Rostov-on-Don	2	(0)
1989–1991	FC SKA Rostov-on-Don	53	(14)
1991	FC Spartak Moscow	0	(0)
1992	Rostselmash Rostov-on-Don	22	(0)
1992	→ FC Rostselmash-2 Rostov-on-Don	6	(3)
1992–1995	FC Kremin Kremenchuk	71	(22)
1995	CSKA-Borysfen Boryspil	1	(2)
1995–1996	FC Shakhtar Donetsk	16	(4)
1996	→ FC Shakhtar-2 Donetsk	1	(0)
1996–1997	FC Kremin Kremenchuk	28	(13)
1997–1999	FC Baltika Kaliningrad	86	(30)
2000–2003	FC Sokol Saratov	129	(62)
2004–2005	FC Terek Grozny	62	(42)
2006	FC SKA Rostov-on-Don	27	(15)
2007	FC Terek Grozny	19	(4)
2008	FC Sheksna Cherepovets	19	(5)

International career
2001	Russia	2	(0)

Managerial career
- 2009–2010: FC Terek Grozny (deputy general director)
- 2012–2013: FC Akvamaster Rostov-on-Don
- * Club domestic league appearances and goals

Andrei Yuryevich Fedkov (Russian: Андрей Юрьевич Федьков; born 4 July 1971) is a Russian former football player.

== Honours ==
- Russian Cup winner: 2004.
- Russian First Division top scorer: 2000 (26 goals), 2004 (38 goals). 38 goals was a record for most goals in one season of the Russian second-tier league until it was improved by Ivan Sergeyev in the 2020–21 season.
- Russian First Division best player: 2000, 2004.

== International career ==
Fedkov made his debut for Russia in a 2002 FIFA World Cup qualifier against Yugoslavia. He was not selected for the World Cup squad.
