= FC Spartak-Telekom Shuya =

- Full name: Football Club Spartak-Telekom Shuya
- Founded: 1991
- Dissolved: 2004
- League: Russian Second Division, Zone West
- 2003: 15th
Home colours	Away colours

FC Spartak-Telekom Shuya (Russian: «Спартак‑Телеком» (Шуя)) was a Russian football team from Shuya. It played professionally from 1998 to 2003. Their best result was 9th place in the Russian Second Division (Zone Center, 2000 and Zone West, 2002). In 2004 it merged into FC Tekstilshchik Ivanovo.

== Team name history ==
- 1991: FC Mashzavod Shuya
- 1992–1995: FC Akvarius Shuya
- 1996–2003: FC Spartak-Telekom Shuya.
