= Atanas Bornosuzov =

Bulgarian footballer

Personal information
- Full name: Atanas Yosifov Bornosuzov
- Date of birth: 5 October 1979 (age 47)
- Place of birth: Plovdiv, Bulgaria
- Height: 1.80 m (5 ft 11 in)
- Position: Midfielder

Team information
- Current team: CSKA 1948 (assistant)

Youth career
- 1988–1997: Maritsa Plovdiv

Senior career*
Years	Team	Apps	(Gls)
1997–2003	Litex Lovech	106	(18)
1998	→ Olimpik Teteven (loan)	10	(0)
1999	→ Dobrudzha (loan)	5	(0)
2004–2005	Naftex Burgas	42	(10)
2005–2006	Tom Tomsk	10	(1)
2006	Levski Sofia	4	(0)
2007	Terek Grozny	34	(2)
2008	Aris Limassol	9	(0)
2008	Al Salmiya	?	(?)
2009–2010	Cherno More	37	(3)
2010	Astra Ploieşti	7	(0)
2011	Bnei Sakhnin	8	(0)
2011	Slavia Sofia	12	(0)
2012–2013	Lokomotiv Sofia	24	(0)

International career
1998–2001	Bulgaria U21	22	(0)

Managerial career
- 2015–2020: CSKA Sofia (youth team)
- 2020–: CSKA 1948 (assistant)
- * Club domestic league appearances and goals

Atanas Bornosuzov (Bulgarian: Атанас Борносузов; born 5 October 1979) is a Bulgarian former professional footballer who played as a midfielder. For Bulgaria U21, Bornosuzov was capped 22 times.

== Career ==
Bornosuzov started to play football in Maritsa Plovdiv. After spending the first two years of his career in the little clubs Sokol Komatevo, Olimpik Teteven and Dobrudzha Dobrich, in 1999 Bornosuzov signed a contract with the Champion of Bulgaria for 1998–99 Litex Lovech. For four years in Litex he earned 106 appearances, scored 18 goals and won the 2001 Bulgarian Cup.

In January 2004, Bornosuzov transferred to Naftex Burgas for a fee of 100 000 €. One year later Atanas signed with Russian side Tom Tomsk.

In June 2006 he came to Levski Sofia. From January 2007 he played in FC Terek Grozny. On 1 July 2008 Bornosuzov signed with Al Salmiya from Kuwait. 3 months later, on 5 October, his compatriot Kiril Nikolov joined the club.

In February 2009 Bornosuzov returned to Bulgaria and signed with Cherno More Varna. For the Sailors, Bornosuzov earned 37 caps and scored 3 goals.

== Honours ==
Litex Lovech

- Bulgarian Cup: 2000–01
