= Dejan Martinović =

Bosnian-Herzegovinian former footballer (born 1983)

Personal information
- Full name: Dejan Martinović
- Date of birth: 19 July 1983 (age 43)
- Place of birth: Doboj, SFR Yugoslavia
- Height: 1.88 m (6 ft 2 in)
- Position: Centre midfielder

Youth career
- Posušje

Senior career*
Years	Team	Apps	(Gls)
2003−2004	Posušje	15	(2)
2004−2005	Hajduk Split	3	(0)
2005	Posušje	12	(4)
2006	Oggersheim	3	(0)
2006	Žepče	5	(1)
2007	Terek Grozny	17	(2)
2008−2010	Široki Brijeg	42	(7)
2010−2011	Braşov	17	(0)
2011−2012	Čelik Zenica	22	(2)
2012	Okzhetpes	9	(0)
2013	Sloga Doboj		
- * Club domestic league appearances and goals as of 09:18, 18 March 2015 (UTC)

Dejan Martinović (born 19 July 1983 in Doboj) is a Bosnian-Herzegovinian former footballer. He also has Croatian nationality.

Martinović has played abroad with Hajduk Split, FC Terek Grozny, FC Brașov and FC Okzhetpes.
