= Roman Udodov =

Russian footballer and coach

Personal information
- Full name: Roman Valeryevich Udodov
- Date of birth: 28 November 1975 (age 50)
- Place of birth: Stavropol, Russian SFSR
- Height: 1.88 m (6 ft 2 in)
- Position: Forward

Team information
- Current team: PFC Dynamo Stavropol (asst coach)

Youth career
- FC Dynamo Stavropol

Senior career*
Years	Team	Apps	(Gls)
2000–2002	FC Dynamo Stavropol	94	(32)
2003–2004	FC Mashuk-KMV Pyatigorsk	59	(20)
2005	FC Volga Nizhny Novgorod	35	(7)
2006–2007	FC Mashuk-KMV Pyatigorsk	74	(9)
2008	FC Volgar-Gazprom-2 Astrakhan	29	(3)
2009	FC Stavropol	33	(2)
2010	FC Torpedo Armavir	14	(2)
2012	FC Mashuk-KMV Pyatigorsk	25	(12)

Managerial career
- 2014–2016: FC Dynamo GTS Stavropol (director)
- 2018–2019: FC Dynamo Stavropol (vice director of sports)
- 2019–: PFC Dynamo Stavropol (assistant)
- * Club domestic league appearances and goals

Roman Valeryevich Udodov (Russian: Роман Валерьевич Удодов; born 28 November 1975) is a Russian professional football coach and a former player. He is an assistant coach with PFC Dynamo Stavropol.

== Club career ==
He made his Russian Football National League debut for FC Mashuk-KMV Pyatigorsk on 26 March 2006 in a game against FC Dynamo Makhachkala. He also played in the FNL for Mashuk-KMV in 2007.
