= Gamlet Siukayev =

Russian footballer

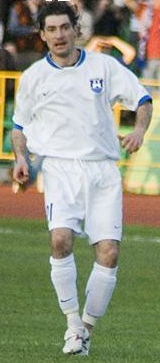

Personal information
- Full name: Gamlet Valeryevich Siukayev
- Date of birth: 9 March 1981 (age 45)
- Height: 1.78 m (5 ft 10 in)
- Positions: Midfielder; forward

Senior career*
Years	Team	Apps	(Gls)
1997–1998	FC Iriston Vladikavkaz	35	(6)
1999	FC Avtodor Vladikavkaz	13	(0)
2000	FC Lokomotiv-2 Moscow	29	(2)
2001–2002	FC Lokomotiv Moscow	0	(0)
2002	FC SKA Rostov-on-Don	12	(0)
2003	FC Avtodor Vladikavkaz	20	(9)
2003–2004	FC Dynamo Makhachkala	41	(10)
2005	PFC Spartak Nalchik	29	(2)
2006	FC Volgar-Gazprom Astrakhan	21	(0)
2007	FC Terek Grozny	29	(0)
2008	FC Baltika Kaliningrad	16	(0)
2009	FC Avtodor Vladikavkaz	24	(1)
- * Club domestic league appearances and goals

Gamlet Valeryevich Siukayev (Russian: Гамлет Валерьевич Сиукаев; born 9 March 1981) is a former Russian professional football player.

== Club career ==
He made his Russian Football National League debut for FC SKA Rostov-on-Don on 22 July 2002 in a game against FC Amkar Perm.
