= Konstantin Demenko =

Russian footballer and coach

Personal information
- Full name: Konstantin Vasilyevich Demenko
- Date of birth: 11 August 1975 (age 51)
- Place of birth: Kabardino-Balkaria, Russian SFSR
- Height: 1.80 m (5 ft 11 in)
- Positions: Midfielder; defender

Team information
- Current team: FC Neftekhimik Nizhnekamsk (assistant manager)

Senior career*
Years	Team	Apps	(Gls)
1992	PFC Spartak Nalchik	0	(0)
1992	FC Presnya Moscow	7	(0)
1993	FC Avtozapchast Baksan	37	(4)
1994	PFC Spartak Nalchik	15	(0)
1995–1996	FC Avtozapchast Baksan	77	(8)
1997–2003	PFC Spartak Nalchik	235	(26)
2004–2009	FC KAMAZ Naberezhnye Chelny	162	(12)

Managerial career
- 2010: FC Krylia Sovetov Samara (reserves)
- 2012–2014: FC KAMAZ Naberezhnye Chelny (assistant)
- 2013–2014: FC KAMAZ-2 Naberezhnye Chelny
- 2014–2015: FC Rubin-2 Kazan (assistant)
- 2015: FC Rubin Kazan (U-21 assistant)
- 2015–2016: FC Aktobe (assistant)
- 2016–: FC Neftekhimik Nizhnekamsk (assistant)
- * Club domestic league appearances and goals

Konstantin Vasilyevich Demenko (Russian: Константин Васильевич Деменко; born 11 August 1975) is a Russian professional football coach and a former player. He is an assistant manager for FC Neftekhimik Nizhnekamsk.

== Playing career ==
He played 13 seasons in the Russian Football National League for PFC Spartak Nalchik and FC KAMAZ Naberezhnye Chelny.
