= Murad Ramazanov (footballer) =

Russian footballer

Personal information
- Full name: Murad Sergeyevich Ramazanov
- Date of birth: 10 March 1979 (age 47)
- Place of birth: Makhachkala, Russia
- Height: 1.80 m (5 ft 11 in)
- Positions: Midfielder; forward

Senior career*
Years	Team	Apps	(Gls)
1996	FC Anzhi-2 Kaspiysk	18	(0)
1997–1998	FC Anzhi Makhachkala	1	(0)
1998	FC Dynamo Makhachkala	16	(1)
1999–2004	FC Anzhi Makhachkala	108	(3)
2004–2006	FC Kryvbas Kryvyi Rih	14	(0)
2006–2007	FC Terek Grozny	65	(6)
2008	FC Anzhi Makhachkala	4	(0)
2008	FC Dynamo Bryansk	17	(1)
2010	FC Daugava	10	(4)
2010	FC Rotor Volgograd	13	(0)
2011–2012	FC Dagdizel Kaspiysk	20	(0)

International career
2000–2001	Russia U-21	6	(1)
- * Club domestic league appearances and goals

Murad Sergeyevich Ramazanov (Russian: Мурад Серге́евич Рамазанов; born 10 March 1979) is a Russian former professional footballer.
