= Damir Memišević =

Bosnia and Herzegovina footballer (born 1984)

Personal information
- Date of birth: 22 January 1984 (age 42)
- Place of birth: Banja Luka, SFR Yugoslavia
- Height: 1.84 m (6 ft 0 in)
- Positions: Centre back; defensive midfielder

Youth career
- 2001–2002: Borac Banja Luka
- 2002–2003: Werder Bremen

Senior career*
Years	Team	Apps	(Gls)
2003–2005	Werder Bremen II		
2005–2006	Željezničar Sarajevo	35	(4)
2007–2008	Terek Grozny	32	(3)
2008–2009	Željezničar Sarajevo	18	(2)
2009	Sloboda Tuzla	11	(0)
2010	FK Laktaši	13	(1)
2011	Taraz	31	(2)
2016–2017	BSK Banja Luka		
Total		105	(8)

International career
2004–2006	Bosnia&Herzegovina U21	13	(0)
- * Club domestic league appearances and goals

Damir Memišević (born 22 January 1984) is a Bosnian-Herzegovinian retired professional footballer who played as a centre back or defensive midfielder.

== Club career ==
Born in Banja Luka, Memišević started his career in his hometown with the local club Borac Banja Luka. He showed his quality at very young age, having already played some senior matches, so he was transferred to Werder Bremen. He was not selected for the first team, and after a few years with the amateur squad he decided to return to Bosnia-Herzegovina, where he was a regular starter in FK Željezničar in the 2005–06 season. In January 2007 he signed a contract with Terek Grozny in the Russian First Division where Memišević made 32 league appearances. In January 2009, he returned to FK Željezničar.

== International career ==
Memišević was a part of the Bosnia-Herzegovina Under 21 team until 2006.
