= FC Dynamo GTS Stavropol =

Russian football club

Dynamo GTS
- Full name: Football Club Dynamo GTS Stavropol
- Founded: 1986
- Dissolved: 2015 (became FC Dynamo Stavropol)
- Ground: Dynamo Stadium
- Capacity: 15,589
- Chairman: Roman Udodov
- Manager: Valeri Zazdravnykh
- League: Russian Professional Football League, Zone South
- 2014–15: 5th
Home colours	Away colours

FC Dynamo GTS Stavropol (Russian: ФК "Динамо ГТС" Ставрополь) was an association football club from Stavropol, Russia, founded in 1986. It last played in the Russian Professional Football League (which is the highest level the club has ever achieved). In 2011, the remains of dissolved FC Krasnodar-2000 were integrated in the club. It is formally a separate club from the club that participated in professional competition previously as Dynamo Stavropol. Before the 2015–16 season, it was renamed to Dynamo Stavropol.

== Club name history ==
- 1986–1991: FC Signal Izobilny
- 1992–1995: FC Dynamo Izobilny
- 1996–1999: FC Signal Izobilny
- 2000–2003: FC Spartak-Kavkaztransgaz Izobilny
- 2004: FC Kavkaztransgaz Izobilny
- 2005–2006: FC Kavkaztransgaz Ryzdvyany
- 2007–2013: FC Kavkaztransgaz-2005 Ryzdvyany
- 2013–2014: FC Gazprom transgaz Stavropol Ryzdvyany
- 2014–2015: FC Dynamo GTS Stavropol
- 2015–present: FC Dynamo Stavropol
