= 2008 FC Terek Grozny season =

Terek Grozny
2008 season
- Chairman: Ramzan Kadyrov
- Manager: Leonid Nazarenko (until 31 May); Vyacheslav Hroznyi (from 1 June)
- Stadium: Sultan Bilimkhanov Stadium
- Russian Premier League: 10th
- Russian Cup: Round of 16 vs FC Moscow
- Top goalscorer: Vladimir Kuzmichyov (5)
Home colours	Away colours

The 2008 Terek Grozny season was the club's first season back in the Russian Premier League, after being relegated at the end of the 2005 season, and their second in their history. Terek finished the season in 10th position and reached the Round of 16 in the 2008–09 Russian Cup, where they were knocked out by reaching the Round of 32 where they were defeated by FC Moscow.

== Squad ==
As of match played 22 November 2008

No.	Name	Nationality	Position	Date of birth (age)	Signed from	Signed in	Contract ends	Apps.	Goals
Goalkeepers
1	Ilion Lika	(Albania)	GK	17 May 1980 (aged 28)	Elbasani	2008		28	0
12	Yaroslav Hodzyur	(Ukraine)	GK	6 March 1985 (aged 23)	Dynamo-2 Kyiv	2008		3	0
16	Magomed Serajdinov	(Russia)	GK	14 December 1991 (aged 16)	Trainee	2008		0	0
30	Askerhan Jamuyev	(Russia)	GK	14 January 1989 (aged 19)	Trainee	2008		0	0
88	Ștefan Sicaci	(Moldova)	GK	8 September 1988 (aged 20)	Sheriff Tiraspol	2008		1	0
95	Rizavdi Edilov	(Russia)	GK	26 June 1988 (aged 20)	Trainee	2005			
Defenders
2	Radoslav Zabavník	(Slovakia)	DF	16 September 1980 (aged 28)	Sparta Prague	2008		27	1
3	Ihor Dudnyk	(Ukraine)	DF	9 August 1985 (aged 23)	Metalurh-2 Zaporizhzhia	2008		4	0
4	Anatoli Romanovich	(Russia)	DF	9 September 1979 (aged 29)	Shinnik Yaroslavl	2007			
14	Valentin Iliev	(Bulgaria)	DF	11 July 1980 (aged 28)	CSKA Sofia	2008		26	2
22	Dumitru Dolgov	(Moldova)	DF	24 August 1987 (aged 21)	Nistru Otaci	2008		7	0
18	Timur Dzhabrailov	(Russia)	DF	5 August 1973 (aged 35)	Angusht Nazran	2001			
25	Rizvan Utsiyev	(Russia)	DF	7 February 1988 (aged 20)	Trainee	2005			
29	Sharudi Buhiyev	(Russia)	DF	17 January 1991 (aged 17)	Trainee	2008		0	0
32	Mansur Soltayev	(Russia)	DF	4 January 1991 (aged 17)	Trainee	2008		0	0
33	Ismail Ediyev	(Russia)	DF	16 February 1988 (aged 20)	Trainee	2005			
35	Murad Tagilov	(Russia)	DF	27 January 1990 (aged 18)	Trainee	2008		0	0
36	Isa Hamidov	(Russia)	DF	7 July 1988 (aged 20)	Trainee	2008		0	0
37	Valihan Mejidov	(Russia)	DF	10 April 1988 (aged 20)	Trainee	2008		0	0
42	Syarhey Amelyanchuk	(Belarus)	DF	8 August 1980 (aged 28)	Rostov	2008		18	1
43	Nikola Karčev	(North Macedonia)	DF	31 March 1981 (aged 27)	Elbasani	2008		3	0
47	Sergei Bendz	(Russia)	DF	3 April 1983 (aged 25)	Rostov	2008		11	2
63	David Lopes	(Brazil)	DF	19 July 1982 (aged 26)	NK Osijek	2008		8	0
Midfielders
7	Guy Essame	(Cameroon)	MF	25 November 1984 (aged 23)	Boavista	2008		21	0
8	Rade Petrović	(Montenegro)	MF	21 September 1982 (aged 26)	FK Borac Čačak	2008		3	0
11	Florentin Petre	(Romania)	MF	15 January 1976 (aged 32)	CSKA Sofia	2008		19	3
15	Aslan Dashayev	(Russia)	MF	19 February 1989 (aged 19)	Trainee	2008		0	0
17	Vladislav Kulik	(Russia)	MF	27 February 1985 (aged 23)	Ural Yekaterinburg	2006			
20	Artyom Voronkin	(Russia)	MF	19 February 1986 (aged 22)	Avangard Kursk	2008		6	0
21	Islam Soltayev	(Russia)	MF	8 November 1988 (aged 20)	Trainee	2008		0	0
26	Anzor Tembulatov	(Russia)	MF	8 June 1989 (aged 19)	Trainee	2008		0	0
27	Adlan Katsayev	(Russia)	MF	20 February 1988 (aged 20)	Trainee	2005			
28	Vladimir Kuzmichyov	(Russia)	MF	28 July 1979 (aged 29)	Kuban Krasnodar	2008		25	6
31	Magomed Ozdoyev	(Russia)	MF	5 November 1992 (aged 16)	Angusht Nazran	2008		0	0
34	Islam Dadayev	(Russia)	MF	26 November 1991 (aged 16)	Trainee	2008		0	0
40	Oleg Vlasov	(Russia)	MF	10 December 1984 (aged 23)	Saturn Ramenskoye	2008		17	0
44	Suleyman Edilov	(Russia)	MF	23 January 1988 (aged 20)	Trainee	2008		0	0
45	Ramzan Utsiyev	(Russia)	MF	24 February 1989 (aged 19)	Trainee	2008		0	0
46	Vitali Kuznetsov	(Russia)	MF	21 February 1986 (aged 22)	Baltika Kaliningrad	2008		5	0
51	Shamil Ashakhanov	(Russia)	MF	23 December 1990 (aged 17)	Trainee	2008		0	0
55	Andrei Mărgăritescu	(Romania)	MF	1 January 1980 (aged 28)	Dinamo București	2008		18	0
77	Marko Dinjar	(Croatia)	MF	21 May 1986 (aged 22)	Osijek	2008		5	0
98	Jean Bouli	(Cameroon)	MF	4 September 1980 (aged 28)	Dynamo Bryansk	2007			
Forwards
9	Sergei Serdyukov	(Russia)	FW	10 April 1981 (aged 27)	Tom Tomsk	2008		27	1
10	Magomed Adiyev	(Russia)	FW	30 June 1977 (aged 31)	Kryvbas Kryvyi Rih	2006			
24	Islam Kadirov	(Russia)	FW	27 November 1989 (aged 18)	Trainee	2008		0	0
33	Shamil Lakhiyalov	(Russia)	FW	28 October 1979 (aged 29)	Anzhi Makhachkala	2007			
38	Hamad Asuhanov	(Russia)	FW	20 January 1988 (aged 20)	Trainee	2008		0	0
41	Islam Tsuroyev	(Russia)	FW	23 April 1989 (aged 19)	Angusht Nazran	2007			
70	Zaur Sadayev	(Russia)	FW	6 November 1989 (aged 19)	Trainee	2006			
78	Daniel Pancu	(Romania)	FW	17 August 1977 (aged 31)	Rapid București	2008		11	3
99	Viktor Zemchenkov	(Russia)	FW	15 September 1986 (aged 22)	Torpedo Moscow	2008		12	1
Out on Loan
Left During the Season
5	Najaddi Ibragimov	(Russia)	DF	5 July 1987 (aged 21)	Trainee	2008		0	0
19	Yuri Mamaev	(Russia)	MF	3 February 1984 (aged 24)	Shinnik Yaroslavl	2008		1	0
23	Goran Dimovski	(North Macedonia)	MF	14 October 1982 (aged 26)	Makedonija Gjorče Petrov	2008		1	0

== Transfers ==
=== Winter ===
In: Note: Flags indicate national team as defined under FIFA eligibility rules; some limited exceptions apply. Players may hold more than one non-FIFA nationality.

No.	Pos.	Nation	Player
1	GK	ALB	Ilion Lika (from (Albania) KF Elbasani)
2	DF	SVK	Radoslav Zabavník (from (Czech Republic) Sparta Prague)
3	DF	UKR	Ihor Dudnyk (from (Ukraine) Metalurh-2 Zaporizhzhia)
7	MF	CMR	Guy Essame (from (Portugal) Boavista)
8	MF	MNE	Rade Petrović (from (Serbia) Borac Čačak)
9	FW	RUS	Sergei Serdyukov (from (Russia) Tom Tomsk)
14	DF	BUL	Valentin Iliev (from (Bulgaria) CSKA Sofia)
19	MF	RUS	Yuri Mamaev (from (Russia) Shinnik Yaroslavl)
20	MF	RUS	Artyom Voronkin (from (Russia) Avangard Kursk)
22	DF	MDA	Dumitru Dolgov (from (Moldova) Nistru Otaci)
23	MF	MKD	Goran Dimovski (from (North Macedonia) Makedonija Gjorče Petrov)
28	MF	RUS	Vladimir Kuzmichyov (from (Russia) Kuban Krasnodar)
31	MF	RUS	Magomed Ozdoyev (from (Russia) Angusht Nazran)
63	DF	BRA	David Lopes (from (Croatia) NK Osijek)
77	MF	CRO	Marko Dinjar (from (Croatia) Osijek)
88	GK	MDA	Ștefan Sicaci (from (Moldova) Sheriff Tiraspol)
99	FW	RUS	Viktor Zemchenkov (from (Russia) Torpedo Moscow)

Out: Note: Flags indicate national team as defined under FIFA eligibility rules; some limited exceptions apply. Players may hold more than one non-FIFA nationality.

No.	Pos.	Nation	Player
—	GK	KAZ	Sergei Stepanenko (to (Kazakhstan) Kairat)
—	GK	UKR	Maksym Levytskyi (to (Russia) Rostov)
—	DF	BIH	Damir Memišević (to (Bosnia and Herzegovina) Željezničar Sarajevo)
—	DF	CMR	Jerry-Christian Tchuissé (to (Russia) Vityaz Podolsk)
—	DF	RUS	Sergei Kurdyukov (to (Russia) Avangard Podolsk)
—	DF	RUS	Yevgeni Varlamov (Retired)
—	MF	ARM	Albert Sarkisyan (to (Russia) Nika Moscow)
—	MF	BIH	Dejan Martinović (to (Bosnia and Herzegovina) Široki Brijeg)
—	MF	BUL	Atanas Bornosuzov (to (Cyprus) Aris Limassol)
—	MF	RUS	Murad Ramazanov (to (Russia) Anzhi Makhachkala)
—	MF	RUS	Taras Shelest (to (Russia) SKA-Khabarovsk)
—	MF	RUS	Gamlet Siukayev (to (Russia) Baltika Kaliningrad)
—	MF	TKM	Wýaçeslaw Krendelew (to (Russia) Amkar Perm)
—	FW	ARM	Andrey Movsisyan (to (Russia) Sportakademklub Moscow)
—	FW	RUS	Shamil Asildarov (to (Russia) Anzhi Makhachkala)
—	FW	RUS	Andrei Fedkov (to (Russia) Sheksna Cherepovets)
—	FW	RUS	Denis Zubko (to (Russia) Kuban Krasnodar)

=== Summer ===
In: Note: Flags indicate national team as defined under FIFA eligibility rules; some limited exceptions apply. Players may hold more than one non-FIFA nationality.

No.	Pos.	Nation	Player
11	MF	ROU	Florentin Petre (from (Bulgaria) CSKA Sofia)
12	GK	UKR	Yaroslav Hodzyur (from (Ukraine) Dynamo-2 Kyiv)
40	MF	RUS	Oleg Vlasov (from (Russia) Saturn Ramenskoye)
42	DF	BLR	Syarhey Amelyanchuk (from (Russia) Rostov)
43	DF	MKD	Nikola Karčev (from (Albania) Elbasani)
46	MF	RUS	Vitali Kuznetsov (from (Russia) Baltika Kaliningrad)
47	DF	RUS	Sergei Bendz (from (Russia) Rostov)
55	MF	ROU	Andrei Mărgăritescu (from (Romania) Dinamo București)
78	FW	ROU	Daniel Pancu (from (Romania) Rapid București)

Out: Note: Flags indicate national team as defined under FIFA eligibility rules; some limited exceptions apply. Players may hold more than one non-FIFA nationality.

No.	Pos.	Nation	Player
5	DF	RUS	Nazhaddi Ibragimov (to (Russia) Volga Tver)
19	MF	RUS	Yuri Mamaev (from (Ukraine) Chornomorets Odesa)
23	DF	MKD	Goran Dimovski (from (North Macedonia) Rabotnički)

== Competitions ==
=== Russian Premier League ===
==== Results ====
14 March 2008 1	Terek Grozny	0 – 3	Krylia Sovetov	Grozny
MSK (UTC+4)	Adiyev (yellow card) 38' (penalty missed) 65'; Lika (yellow card) 90+1'	Report	Ajinjal (yellow card) 16'; Kalachev (yellow card) 42' (goal) 77'; Savin 48'; Bobyor (yellow card) 60'; Taranov (yellow card) 65'; Oh (yellow card) 65'; Lobos (yellow card) 81'; Tikhonov 90+1' (pen.)	Stadium: Sultan Bilimkhanov Stadium; Attendance: 10,120; Referee: Igor Zakharov

22 March 2008 2	Saturn Moscow	3 – 1	Terek Grozny	Moscow
MSK (UTC+4)	Jakubko 10', 19' (yellow card) 62'; Ďurica (yellow card) 64'; Vorobyov (yellow card) 75'	Report	Essame (yellow card) 45+1'; Zabavník (yellow card) 59'; Romanovich (yellow card) 61'; Lakhiyalov 66'	Stadium: Saturn Stadium; Attendance: 9,000; Referee: Maksim Layushkin

29 March 2008 3	Terek Grozny	2 – 1	Spartak Nalchik	Grozny
MSK (UTC+4)	Romanovich (yellow card) 9'; Lakhiyalov 44', 73' (pen.) (yellow card) 90+1'; Petrović (yellow card) 55'; Kuzmichyov (yellow card) 56'	Report	Gogua (yellow card) 23'; Dzakhmishev 39'; Patyak (yellow card) 72'; Mashukov (yellow card) 82'	Stadium: Sultan Bilimkhanov Stadium; Attendance: 8,000; Referee: Yuri Baskakov

5 April 2008 4	Terek Grozny	1 – 0	CSKA Moscow	Grozny
14:00 MSK (UTC+4)	Essame (yellow card) 58'; Kuzmichyov 65'; Zabavník (yellow card) 84'	Report	Šemberas (yellow card) 68'; Ryzhov (yellow card) 80'	Stadium: Akhmat-Arena; Attendance: 10,000; Referee: Aleksandr Gvardis

13 April 2008 5	Lokomotiv Moscow	2 – 0	Terek Grozny	Moscow
MSK (UTC+4)	Cociș (yellow card) 26' (goal) 33'; Torbinski 37'; Sennikov (yellow card) 59'	Report	Zabavník 68'; Romanovich 78'	Stadium: RZD Arena; Attendance: 14,207; Referee: Alexei Kovalev

20 April 2008 6	Terek Grozny	2 – 1	Luch-Energiya Vladivostok	Grozny
MSK (UTC+4)	Serdyukov (red card) 11'; Kulik 3' (pen.); Kuzmichyov 45+1'; Lopes (yellow card) 58'	Report	Sheshukov (yellow card) 22'; Vujović (yellow card) 29'; Shevchenko (yellow card) 39' (goal) 90'; Čech (yellow card) 45+1'	Stadium: Sultan Bilimkhanov Stadium; Attendance: 9,500; Referee: Almir Kayumov

26 April 2008 7	Zenit St.Petersburg	3 – 1	Terek Grozny	Saint Petersburg
MSK (UTC+4)	Zabavník 17' (o.g.); Zyryanov 38'; Tekke 53'	Report	Pancu 47'; Zabavník (yellow card) 83'	Stadium: Petrovsky Stadium; Attendance: 18,000; Referee: Sergei Karasev

3 May 2008 8	Terek Grozny	1 – 3	Tom Tomsk	Grozny
MSK (UTC+4)	Iliev (yellow card) 36'; Dzhabrailov (yellow card) 54'; Essame (yellow card) 56'; Dolgov (yellow card) 71'; Zemchenkov 75'	Report	Ajinjal (penalty missed) 11' (yellow card) 84'; Strelkov 11', 64' (yellow card) 84'; Volkov (yellow card) 54'; Arkhipov 67'; Yanotovsky (yellow card) 90+3'	Stadium: Sultan Bilimkhanov Stadium; Attendance: 5,000; Referee: Aleksei Nikolaev

7 May 2008 9	Khimki	0 – 1	Terek Grozny	Khimki
MSK (UTC+4)	Nizamutdinov (yellow card) 17'; Mrđa (yellow card) 50'; Stepanov (yellow card) 56'	Report	Romanovich (yellow card) 21'; Zabavník (yellow card) 39' (goal) 77'; Dinjar (yellow card) 90+2'	Stadium: Rodina Stadium; Attendance: 4,000; Referee: Yuri Baskakov

11 May 2008 10	Terek Grozny	1 – 0	Amkar Perm	Grozny
MSK (UTC+4)	Lopes (yellow card) 71'; Voronkin (yellow card) 86'	Report	Kushev 7'; Starkov (yellow card) 50'; Zhilyayev (yellow card) 70'	Stadium: Sultan Bilimkhanov Stadium; Attendance: 8,500; Referee: Vladimir Pettay

16 May 2008 11	Dynamo Moscow	2 – 1	Terek Grozny	Moscow
MSK (UTC+4)	Danny (yellow card) 45' (goal) 63'; Fernández 69'; Kowalczyk (yellow card) 74'; Karpovich (yellow card) 90'	Report	Lakhiyalov (yellow card) 37'; Dudnyk (yellow card) 45'; Dzhabrailov (yellow card) 72'; Kuzmichyov 86'	Stadium: Central Dynamo Stadium; Attendance: 7,000; Referee: Igor Egorov

6 July 2008 12	Terek Grozny	3 – 1	Spartak Moscow	Grozny
MSK (UTC+4)	Iliev (yellow card) 21'; Dzhabrailov 53'; Bouli 57'; Kuzmichyov 66'; Kulik (yellow card) 82'	Report	Kalynychenko 36'; Pavlyuchenko (yellow card) 90'	Stadium: Sultan Bilimkhanov Stadium; Attendance: 9,650; Referee: Stanislav Sukhina

13 July 2008 13	FC Moscow	0 – 0	Terek Grozny	Moscow
MSK (UTC+4)	Bracamonte (yellow card) 23'	Report	Serdyukov (yellow card) 22'; Dzhabrailov (yellow card) 49'; Bouli (yellow card) 87'	Stadium: Eduard Streltsov Stadium; Attendance: 3,000; Referee: Vladimir Pettay

20 July 2008 14	Terek Grozny	0 – 0	Rubin Kazan	Grozny
MSK (UTC+4)	Pancu (yellow card) 42'; Dzhabrailov (yellow card) 89'; Bouli (yellow card) 90+1'	Report	Noboa (yellow card) 36'; Ryzhikov (yellow card) 42'; Ryazantsev (yellow card) 83'	Stadium: Sultan Bilimkhanov Stadium; Attendance: 9,500; Referee: Maksim Layushkin

27 July 2008 15	Shinnik Yaroslavl	1 – 1	Terek Grozny	Yaroslavl
MSK (UTC+4)	Vještica (yellow card) 55'; Boyarintsev (yellow card) 61'; Kudryashov (yellow card) 67'; Đorđević (yellow card) 71'; Semochko (yellow card) 72'; Khazov 81'; Lazarov (yellow card) 86'; Olexici (yellow card) 88'	Report	Kulik 26'; Petre (yellow card) 42'; Romanovich (yellow card) 43'; Kulik (yellow card) 72'; Mărgăritescu (yellow card) 77'; Zabavník (yellow card) 88'	Stadium: Shinnik Stadium; Attendance: 10,800; Referee: Igor Zakharov

3 August 2008 16	Terek Grozny	1 – 0	Saturn Moscow	Grozny
MSK (UTC+4)	Petre (yellow card) 26'; Iliev 45+1'; Dzhabrailov (yellow card) 61'; Kulik (yellow card) 90+3'	Report	Vorobyov (yellow card) 44'; Igonin (yellow card) 50'; Nakhushev (yellow card) 61'	Stadium: Sultan Bilimkhanov Stadium; Attendance: 8,500; Referee: Igor Egorov

10 August 2008 17	Spartak Nalchik	2 – 0	Terek Grozny	Grozny
MSK (UTC+4)	Siradze 18'; Frunză (yellow card) 75'; Samsonov 89'	Report	Romanovich (yellow card) 19'; Lopes (yellow card) 24'	Stadium: Sultan Bilimkhanov Stadium; Attendance: 9,000; Referee: Vladimir Pettay

17 August 2008 18	CSKA Moscow	2 – 0	Terek Grozny	Moscow
17:30 MSK (UTC+4)	Dzagoev 47'; Ignashevich 70'	Report	Zabavník (yellow card) 24'; Iliev (yellow card) 27'	Stadium: Luzhniki Stadium; Attendance: 8,000; Referee: Stanislav Sukhina

23 August 2008 19	Terek Grozny	2 – 1	Lokomotiv Moscow	Grozny
MSK (UTC+4)	Petre 23'; Zabavník (yellow card) 31'; Pancu (yellow card) 60'; Pereyra 62' (o.g.); Kuzmichyov (yellow card) 70'; Zemchenkov (yellow card) 90+3'	Report	Fininho (yellow card) 22'; Torbinski (yellow card) 31'; Glushakov 36'; Rodolfo (yellow card) 39'; Pereyra (yellow card) 74'	Stadium: Sultan Bilimkhanov Stadium; Attendance: 9,200; Referee: Alexei Kovalev

31 August 2008 20	Luch-Energiya Vladivostok	1 – 1	Terek Grozny	Vladivostok
MSK (UTC+4)	Bulyga (yellow card) 45'; D.A.Smirnov 50'; Novković (yellow card) 83'	Report	Dzhabrailov (yellow card) 35' (goal) 77'; Kuzmichyov (yellow card) 55'; Petre 83'	Stadium: Dynamo Stadium; Attendance: 8,000; Referee: Aleksei Nikolaev

13 September 2008 21	Terek Grozny	1 – 4	Zenit St.Petersburg	Grozny
MSK (UTC+4)	Bouli (yellow card) 15'; Bendz (yellow card) 39' (goal) 75'; Kuznetsov (yellow card) 90+'	Report	Arshavin 12'; Križanac 23'; Tymoshchuk (yellow card) 25'; Anyukov (yellow card) 32'; Pogrebnyak 41'; Zyryanov 70'	Stadium: Sultan Bilimkhanov Stadium; Attendance: 13,000; Referee: Igor Egorov

21 September 2008 22	Tom Tomsk	2 – 0	Terek Grozny	Tomsk
MSK (UTC+4)	Jokić 6'; Tarasov 29'; Yanotovsky (yellow card) 44'; Stoica (yellow card) 58'; Vejić 63'	Report	Amelyanchuk (yellow card) 33'; Petre (yellow card) 66'; Bendz (yellow card) 90+2'	Stadium: Trud Stadium; Attendance: 15,000; Referee: Vladislav Bezborodov

28 September 2008 23	Terek Grozny	1 – 0	Khimki	Grozny
MSK (UTC+4)	Bouli 61'; Essame (yellow card) 62'; Bendz (yellow card) 79'; Lika (yellow card) 90+2'	Report	Baýramow (yellow card) 14'; Jakubko (yellow card) 66'	Stadium: Sultan Bilimkhanov Stadium; Attendance: 4,500; Referee: Aleksei Nikolaev

5 October 2008 24	Amkar Perm	0 – 0	Terek Grozny	Perm
MSK (UTC+4)	Sirakov (yellow card) 60'; Drinčić (yellow card) 87'	Report	Mărgăritescu (yellow card) 45+1'	Stadium: Zvezda Stadium; Attendance: 14,800; Referee: Ildus Biglov

19 October 2008 25	Terek Grozny	0 – 0	Dynamo Moscow	Grozny
MSK (UTC+4)	Mărgăritescu (yellow card) 35'; Voronkin (yellow card) 44'; Amelyanchuk (yellow card) 61'	Report	Tanasijević (yellow card) 45' (yellow-red card) 88'; Fernández (yellow card) 50'	Stadium: Sultan Bilimkhanov Stadium; Attendance: 7,700; Referee: Igor Egorov

25 October 2008 26	Spartak Moscow	3 – 1	Terek Grozny	Moscow
MSK (UTC+4)	Pavlenko 45+1' (pen.); Bazhenov 58'; Kováč 61'	Report	Kuzmichyov (yellow card) 14' (goal) 74'; Amelyanchuk (yellow card) 45+1'; Mărgăritescu (yellow card) 68'	Stadium: Luzhniki Stadium; Attendance: 11,000; Referee: Vitali Doroshenko

2 November 2008 27	Terek Grozny	1 – 1	FC Moscow	Grozny
MSK (UTC+4)	Zabavník (yellow card) 12'; Iliev (yellow card) 29' (goal) 90+5'; Bouli (yellow card) 80'	Report	Vukić 49'; Nababkin (yellow card) 67'; Goore (yellow card) 75'	Stadium: Sultan Bilimkhanov Stadium; Attendance: 9,800; Referee: Stanislav Sukhina

9 November 2008 28	Rubin Kazan	1 – 3	Terek Grozny	Kazan
MSK (UTC+4)	Fyodorov (yellow card) 5'; Semak 28'; Kobenko (yellow card) 18'; Sharonov (yellow card) 76'	Report	Bendz 32'; Mărgăritescu (yellow card) 44'; Zabavník (yellow card) 72'; Petre 82', 86'	Stadium: Central Stadium; Attendance: 24,500; Referee: Sergei Karasev

16 November 2008 29	Terek Grozny	0 – 0	Shinnik Yaroslavl	Grozny
MSK (UTC+4)	Iliev (yellow card) 51'; Adiyev (yellow card) 68'; Bendz (yellow card) 87'	Report	Silva (yellow card) 5'; Gorawski (yellow card) 19'; Monaryov (yellow card) 58'; Semochko (yellow card) 90'	Stadium: Sultan Bilimkhanov Stadium; Attendance: 8,000; Referee: Vladimir Pettay

22 November 2008 30	Krylia Sovetov	4 – 3	Terek Grozny	Samara
MSK (UTC+4)	Tikhonov 46' (pen.); Taranov 60'; Koller 68', 72'	Report	Pancu 63', 79'; Lakhiyalov 83'	Stadium: Metallurg Stadium; Attendance: 19,500; Referee: Igor Zakharov

==== League table ====
Pos	Team	Pld	W	D	L	GF	GA	GD	Pts
8	Spartak Moscow	30	11	11	8	43	39	+4	44
9	FC Moscow	30	9	11	10	34	36	−2	38
10	Terek Grozny	30	9	8	13	28	42	−14	35
11	Saturn	30	7	12	11	26	30	−4	33
12	Spartak Nalchik	30	8	8	14	30	39	−9	32

Source: RFPL (in Russian)
Rules for classification: 1st points; 2nd matches won; 3rd head-to-head (points, matches won, goal difference, goals scored, away goals scored); 4th goal difference; 5th goals scored; 6th away goals scored; 7th position in previous season or decision game

=== Russian Cup ===
6 August 2008 Round of 32	Anzhi Makhachkala	2 – 3	Terek Grozny	Makhachkala
18:00 MSK (UTC+4)	Gridnev 8'; Barabadze 15'	Report	Serdyukov 11' (pen.); Amelyanchuk 21'; Mărgăritescu (yellow card) 31'; Kuzmichyov 34'; Vlasov (yellow card) 52'; Zabavník (yellow card) 63'	Stadium: Dynamo Stadium; Attendance: 10,600; Referee: Vladislav Bezborodov

24 September 2008 Round of 16	FC Moscow	3 – 0	Terek Grozny	Moscow
MSK (UTC+4)	Kuzmin 28' (pen.), 84' (pen.); Česnauskis 49'; Jop (yellow card) 70'	Report	Bendz (yellow card) 69'; Karčev (red card) 84'	Stadium: Eduard Streltsov Stadium; Attendance: 683; Referee: Vladimir Kazmenko

== Squad statistics ==
As of match played 22 November 2008

=== Appearances and goals ===
No.	Pos	Nat	Player	Total		Premier League		Russian Cup	
No.	Pos	Nat	Player	Apps	Goals	Apps	Goals	Apps	Goals
1	GK	(Albania) ALB	Ilion Lika	28	0	27	0	1	0
2	DF	(Slovakia) SVK	Radoslav Zabavník	27	1	25	1	2	0
3	DF	(Ukraine) UKR	Ihor Dudnyk	4	0	4	0	0	0
4	DF	(Russia) RUS	Anatoli Romanovich	21	0	20	0	1	0
7	MF	(Cameroon) CMR	Guy Essame	21	0	14+6	0	0+1	0
8	MF	(Montenegro) MNE	Rade Petrović	3	0	3	0	0	0
9	FW	(Russia) RUS	Sergei Serdyukov	27	1	15+11	0	1	1
10	FW	(Russia) RUS	Magomed Adiyev	14	0	4+9	0	1	0
11	MF	(Romania) ROU	Florentin Petre	19	3	17	3	2	0
12	GK	(Ukraine) UKR	Yaroslav Hodzyur	3	0	2	0	1	0
14	DF	(Bulgaria) BUL	Valentin Iliev	26	2	25	2	1	0
17	MF	(Russia) RUS	Vladislav Kulik	22	2	12+8	2	2	0
18	DF	(Russia) RUS	Timur Dzhabrailov	31	2	29	2	2	0
20	MF	(Russia) RUS	Artyom Voronkin	6	0	0+6	0	0	0
22	DF	(Moldova) MDA	Dumitru Dolgov	7	0	5+2	0	0	0
28	MF	(Russia) RUS	Vladimir Kuzmichyov	25	6	22+2	5	1	1
33	FW	(Russia) RUS	Shamil Lakhiyalov	20	5	18+1	4	1	1
40	MF	(Russia) RUS	Oleg Vlasov	17	0	7+8	0	1+1	0
41	FW	(Russia) RUS	Islam Tsuroyev	1	0	0+1	0	0	0
42	DF	(Belarus) BLR	Syarhey Amelyanchuk	18	1	16	0	2	1
43	DF	(North Macedonia) MKD	Nikola Karčev	3	0	1	0	1+1	0
46	MF	(Russia) RUS	Vitali Kuznetsov	5	0	0+4	0	1	0
47	DF	(Russia) RUS	Sergei Bendz	11	2	10	2	0+1	0
55	MF	(Romania) ROU	Andrei Mărgăritescu	18	0	15+1	0	2	0
63	DF	(Brazil) BRA	David Lopes	8	0	6+2	0	0	0
70	FW	(Russia) RUS	Zaur Sadayev	3	0	0+3	0	0	0
77	MF	(Croatia) CRO	Marko Dinjar	5	0	2+3	0	0	0
78	FW	(Romania) ROU	Daniel Pancu	11	3	9+2	3	0	0
88	GK	(Moldova) MDA	Ștefan Sicaci	1	0	1	0	0	0
95	GK	(Russia) RUS	Rizavdi Edilov	1	0	0+1	0	0	0
98	MF	(Cameroon) CMR	Jean Bouli	15	2	9+5	2	0+1	0
99	FW	(Russia) RUS	Viktor Zemchenkov	12	1	5+6	1	0+1	0
Players away on loan:
Players who appeared for Terek Grozny but left during the season:
19	MF	(Russia) RUS	Yuri Mamaev	1	0	0+1	0	0	0
23	MF	(North Macedonia) MKD	Goran Dimovski	1	0	1	0	0	0

=== Goal Scorers ===
Place	Position	Nation	Number	Name	Premier League	Russian Cup	Total
1	MF	(Russia)	28	Vladimir Kuzmichyov	5	1	1
2	FW	(Russia)	33	Shamil Lakhiyalov	4	0	4
3	MF	(Romania)	11	Florentin Petre	3	0	3
3	DF	(Romania)	78	Daniel Pancu	3	0	3
5	DF	(Russia)	14	Valentin Iliev	2	0	2
5	MF	(Russia)	17	Vladislav Kulik	2	0	2
5	DF	(Russia)	18	Timur Dzhabrailov	2	0	2
5	DF	(Russia)	47	Sergei Bendz	2	0	2
5	MF	(Cameroon)	98	Jean Bouli	2	0	2
10	FW	(Russia)	99	Viktor Zemchenkov	1	0	1
10	DF	(Slovakia)	2	Radoslav Zabavník	1	0	1
10	FW	(Russia)	9	Sergei Serdyukov	0	1	1
10	DF	(Belarus)	42	Syarhey Amelyanchuk	0	1	1
10				Own goal	1	0	1
				TOTALS	28	3	31

=== Disciplinary record ===
Number	Nation	Position	Name	Premier League		Russian Cup		Total	
Number	Nation	Position	Name	Booked	Sent off (straight red)	Booked	Sent off (straight red)	Booked	Sent off (straight red)
1	(Albania)	GK	Ilion Lika	2	0	0	0	2	0
2	(Slovakia)	DF	Radoslav Zabavník	10	0	1	0	11	0
3	(Ukraine)	DF	Ihor Dudnyk	1	0	0	0	1	0
4	(Russia)	DF	Anatoli Romanovich	7	0	0	0	7	0
7	(Cameroon)	MF	Guy Essame	4	0	0	0	4	0
8	(Montenegro)	MF	Rade Petrović	1	0	0	0	1	0
9	(Russia)	FW	Sergei Serdyukov	1	1	0	0	1	1
10	(Russia)	FW	Magomed Adiyev	2	0	0	0	2	0
11	(Romania)	MF	Florentin Petre	4	0	0	0	4	0
14	(Bulgaria)	DF	Valentin Iliev	5	0	0	0	5	0
17	(Russia)	MF	Vladislav Kulik	3	0	0	0	3	0
18	(Russia)	DF	Timur Dzhabrailov	6	0	0	0	6	0
20	(Russia)	MF	Artyom Voronkin	2	0	0	0	2	0
22	(Moldova)	DF	Dumitru Dolgov	1	0	0	0	1	0
28	(Russia)	MF	Vladimir Kuzmichyov	4	0	1	0	5	0
33	(Russia)	FW	Shamil Lakhiyalov	2	0	0	0	2	0
40	(Russia)	MF	Oleg Vlasov	0	0	1	0	1	0
42	(Belarus)	DF	Syarhey Amelyanchuk	3	0	0	0	3	0
43	(North Macedonia)	DF	Nikola Karčev	0	0	0	1	0	1
46	(Russia)	MF	Vitali Kuznetsov	1	0	0	0	1	0
47	(Russia)	DF	Sergei Bendz	4	0	1	0	5	0
55	(Romania)	MF	Andrei Mărgăritescu	5	0	1	0	6	0
63	(Brazil)	DF	David Lopes	3	0	0	0	3	0
77	(Croatia)	MF	Marko Dinjar	1	0	0	0	1	0
78	(Romania)	FW	Daniel Pancu	2	0	0	0	2	0
98	(Cameroon)	MF	Jean Bouli	4	0	0	0	4	0
99	(Russia)	FW	Viktor Zemchenkov	1	0	0	0	1	0
Players away on loan:
Players who left Terek Grozny during the season:
			TOTALS	79	1	5	1	84	2
