= List of Latvian football transfers summer 2010 =

This is a list of Latvian football transfers in the 2010 summer transfer window by club. Only transfers of the Latvian Higher League are included.

All transfers mentioned are shown in the external links at the bottom of the page. If you want to insert a transfer that isn't shown there, please add a reference.

== Latvian Higher League ==
=== SK Liepājas Metalurgs ===
In: Note: Flags indicate national team as defined under FIFA eligibility rules; some limited exceptions apply. Players may hold more than one non-FIFA nationality.

No.	Pos.	Nation	Player
—	DF	BRA	Jhonnes Marques de Souza (from (Croatia) NK Hrvatski Dragovoljac)
—	DF	CRO	Jurica Puljiz (from (Kazakhstan) FC Taraz)
—	MF	JPN	Takafumi Akahoshi (from (Japan) Zweigen Kanazawa)
—	DF	LAT	Pāvels Mihadjuks (from (Scotland) Dundee United)
—	MF	LTU	Darius Miceika (from (Ukraine) Metalurh Zaporizhya)

Out: Note: Flags indicate national team as defined under FIFA eligibility rules; some limited exceptions apply. Players may hold more than one non-FIFA nationality.

No.	Pos.	Nation	Player
—	DF	BRA	Wellington Santos da Silva (released)
—	FW	MNE	Ilija Spasojević (released)
—	MF	LAT	Genādijs Soloņicins (released)
—	FW	LAT	Vladimirs Kamešs (on loan to FB Gulbene-2005)
—	DF	LAT	Artjoms Kuzņecovs (on loan to (Lithuania) FK Tauras Tauragė)
—	DF	LAT	Oskars Kļava (to (Russia) FC Anzhi Makhachkala)
—	MF	LAT	Krišjānis Dinsbergs (on loan to FB Gulbene-2005)
—	GK	LAT	Pāvels Naglis (released)
—	MF	LAT	Dmitrijs Mihailovs (released)
—	MF	LAT	Jevgēņijs Koršakovs (released)
—	FW	LAT	Raivo Kalniņš (released)

=== FK Ventspils ===
In: Note: Flags indicate national team as defined under FIFA eligibility rules; some limited exceptions apply. Players may hold more than one non-FIFA nationality.

No.	Pos.	Nation	Player
—	DF	LAT	Nauris Bulvītis (loan return from (Scotland) Inverness Caledonian Thistle)
—	FW	LAT	Edgars Gauračs (loan return from (Romania) FC Rapid Bucharest)
—	FW	LAT	Andrejs Butriks (loan return from (Romania) FC Ceahlaul Piatra Neamt)
—	DF	RUS	Mikhail Mischenko (on loan from (Russia) FC Rubin Kazan)
—	FW	LAT	Romāns Bespalovs (from FC Tranzit)
—	DF	LAT	Vitālijs Stols (from FC Tranzit)
—	MF	CMR	Serge Tatiefang (from FC Tranzit)
—	MF	CMR	Michael Maki Mvondo (from (Italy) A.S.D. Porfido Albiano)
—	FW	NGR	Ahmed Abdultaofik (from (Nigeria) Kwara Football Academy)

Out: Note: Flags indicate national team as defined under FIFA eligibility rules; some limited exceptions apply. Players may hold more than one non-FIFA nationality.

No.	Pos.	Nation	Player
—	DF	LAT	Artūrs Silagailis (loan return to (Ukraine) Kryvbas Kryvyi Rih)
—	DF	LAT	Igors Savčenkovs (on loan to FK Jelgava)
—	FW	LAT	Edgars Gauračs (released)
—	FW	RUS	Ivan Shpakov (to (Russia) FC Zhemchuzhina-Sochi)
—	FW	BLR	Alexey Kuchuk (to (Belarus) FC Belshina Bobruisk)
—	GK	LAT	Aleksandrs Koliņko (to (Russia) Spartak Nalchik)
—	DF	LAT	Aleksandrs Solovjovs (to (Cyprus) Atromitos Yeroskipou)
—	DF	RUS	Vladislav Kryuchkov (released)

=== Skonto FC ===
In: Note: Flags indicate national team as defined under FIFA eligibility rules; some limited exceptions apply. Players may hold more than one non-FIFA nationality.

No.	Pos.	Nation	Player
—	MF	LAT	Oļegs Laizāns (loan return from (Poland) Lechia Gdańsk)
—	GK	GER	Michael Kaltenhauser (from (Austria) SV Grödig)
—	FW	GEO	David Janelidze (from JFK Olimps/RFS)

Out: Note: Flags indicate national team as defined under FIFA eligibility rules; some limited exceptions apply. Players may hold more than one non-FIFA nationality.

No.	Pos.	Nation	Player
—	MF	LAT	Juris Laizāns (to (Russia) FC Salyut Belgorod)
—	MF	LAT	Oļegs Laizāns (on loan to FB Gulbene-2005)
—	FW	LAT	Artūrs Karašausks (on loan to (Ukraine) FC Dnipro Dnipropetrovsk)

=== FK Jūrmala-VV ===
In: Note: Flags indicate national team as defined under FIFA eligibility rules; some limited exceptions apply. Players may hold more than one non-FIFA nationality.

No.	Pos.	Nation	Player
—	DF	LAT	Ingus Šlampe (from (England) Bridgwater Town F.C.)
—	FW	LAT	Ruslans Agafonovs (from FK Daugava Riga)

Out: Note: Flags indicate national team as defined under FIFA eligibility rules; some limited exceptions apply. Players may hold more than one non-FIFA nationality.

No.	Pos.	Nation	Player
—	DF	LAT	Dmitrijs Halvitovs (to SK Blāzma)
—	MF	LAT	Maksims Kolokoļenkins (released)
—	MF	RUS	Roman Nagumanov (to (Lithuania) FK Žalgiris Vilnius)
—	MF	LAT	Romāns Bezzubovs (to (Albania) KS Bylis Ballsh)

=== JFK Olimps/RFS ===
In: Note: Flags indicate national team as defined under FIFA eligibility rules; some limited exceptions apply. Players may hold more than one non-FIFA nationality.

No.	Pos.	Nation	Player
—	GK	LAT	Oskars Darģis (from youth team)
—	MF	GEO	Giorgi Chkhikvihvili (from (Georgia (country)) Sasko FC)
—	GK	LAT	Andrejs Piedels (unattached; as playing coach)
—	DF	UKR	Oleksandr Nazarchuk (from (Ukraine) FC Dynamo Kyiv)

Out: Note: Flags indicate national team as defined under FIFA eligibility rules; some limited exceptions apply. Players may hold more than one non-FIFA nationality.

No.	Pos.	Nation	Player
—	GK	LAT	Vitālijs Meļņičenko (to SK Blāzma)
—	GK	LAT	Vitālijs Artjomenko (to (Cyprus) AEP Paphos)
—	FW	LAT	Armands Prutāns (to FK Jaunība Rīga)
—	FW	LAT	Deniss Ostrovskis (to FS Metta-Latvijas Universitāte)
—	FW	GEO	David Janelidze (to Skonto FC)

=== SK Blāzma ===
In: Note: Flags indicate national team as defined under FIFA eligibility rules; some limited exceptions apply. Players may hold more than one non-FIFA nationality.

No.	Pos.	Nation	Player
—	GK	LAT	Vitālijs Meļņičenko (from JFK Olimps/RFS)
—	DF	LAT	Jevgēņijs Adamenoks (from BFC Daugava-2)
—	MF	LAT	Dmitrijs Halvitovs (from FK Jūrmala-VV)
—	FW	LAT	Vjačeslavs Kondakovs (from FK Tukums 2000)
—	DF	RUS	Vitaliy Zaytsev (from (Russia) FC Saturn Ramenskoe)
—	MF	JPN	Go Nagaoka (from (Poland) Przebój Wolbrom)
—	MF	RUS	Babek Nabiyev (from (Russia) FC Nika Moscow)
—	FW	LAT	Guntars Silagailis (from (Belarus) FC Vitebsk)

Out: Note: Flags indicate national team as defined under FIFA eligibility rules; some limited exceptions apply. Players may hold more than one non-FIFA nationality.

No.	Pos.	Nation	Player
—	DF	LAT	Armands Jermakovs (released)
—	DF	LAT	Iļja Kirilovs (released)
—	MF	BLR	Artsyom Vaskow (to (Belarus) FC Gomel)
—	FW	LAT	Vladimirs Volkovs (to FC Daugava)

=== FC Tranzit ===
In: Note: Flags indicate national team as defined under FIFA eligibility rules; some limited exceptions apply. Players may hold more than one non-FIFA nationality.

No.	Pos.	Nation	Player
—	MF	LAT	Nikolajs Zaicevs (from (England) Oldham Athletic F.C.)
—	FW	LAT	Dmitrijs Bremza (from the youth academy)
—	MF	LAT	Eduards Tidenbergs (from the youth academy)
—	DF	LAT	Aleksandrs Anohins (from the youth academy)
—	FW	LAT	Daniels Vasiļjevs (from the youth academy)
—	MF	LAT	Valerijs Stepanovs (from the youth academy)
—	MF	LAT	Aleksejs Tarasovs (from the youth academy)
—	MF	LAT	Bogdans Oniščuks (from the youth academy)
—	DF	LAT	Ēriks Melbārdis (from the youth academy)
—	MF	LAT	Maksims Vasiļjevs (from the youth academy)
—	DF	LAT	Ervīns Ziemelis (from the youth academy)
—	DF	LAT	Artjoms Solomatovs (from the youth academy)
—	DF	LAT	Maksims Doļņikovs (from the youth academy)
—	FW	LAT	Vlads Rimkus (from the youth academy)

Out: Note: Flags indicate national team as defined under FIFA eligibility rules; some limited exceptions apply. Players may hold more than one non-FIFA nationality.

No.	Pos.	Nation	Player
—	GK	BLR	Pavel Chasnowski (released)
—	FW	LAT	Romāns Bespalovs (to FK Ventspils)
—	MF	LAT	Pāvels Hohlovs (on loan to FK Jelgava)
—	MF	COL	Roger Cañas (to (Russia) FC Sibir Novosibirsk)
—	DF	LAT	Toms Aizgrāvis (to FK Tukums 2000)
—	DF	RUS	Ivan Stain (to (Russia) FC Sibir Novosibirsk)
—	GK	LAT	Jevgēņijs Sazonovs (to (Cyprus) Atromitos Yeroskipou)
—	DF	LAT	Vitālijs Stols (to FK Ventspils)
—	MF	CMR	Serge Tatiefang (to FK Ventspils)

=== FK Jelgava ===
In: Note: Flags indicate national team as defined under FIFA eligibility rules; some limited exceptions apply. Players may hold more than one non-FIFA nationality.

No.	Pos.	Nation	Player
—	DF	LAT	Igors Savčenkovs (on loan from FK Ventspils)
—	MF	LAT	Pāvels Hohlovs (on loan from FC Tranzit)
—	DF	LAT	Mārcis Ošs (from FK Limbaži)
—	MF	LAT	Dmitrijs Borisovs (from (Scotland) Clyde FC)
—	MF	JPN	Jumpei Shimmura (from (Paraguay) General Caballero)

Out: Note: Flags indicate national team as defined under FIFA eligibility rules; some limited exceptions apply. Players may hold more than one non-FIFA nationality.

No.	Pos.	Nation	Player
—	DF	LAT	Mārcis Savinovs (on loan to Jaunība Rīga)
—	DF	LAT	Māris Savinovs (on loan to Jaunība Rīga)

=== FK Jaunība ===
In: Note: Flags indicate national team as defined under FIFA eligibility rules; some limited exceptions apply. Players may hold more than one non-FIFA nationality.

No.	Pos.	Nation	Player
—	MF	LAT	Pāvels Koļcovs (from FC Daugava)
—	MF	LAT	Aleksejs Kuplovs-Oginskis (from FC Daugava)
—	DF	LAT	Mārcis Savinovs (from FK Jelgava)
—	DF	LAT	Māris Savinovs (from FK Jelgava)
—	FW	LAT	Armands Prutāns (from JFK Olimps/RFS)

Out: Note: Flags indicate national team as defined under FIFA eligibility rules; some limited exceptions apply. Players may hold more than one non-FIFA nationality.

No.	Pos.	Nation	Player
—	MF	EST	Oleg Maksimov (released)
—	FW	LAT	Mihails Cigankovs (released)

=== FC Daugava ===
In: Note: Flags indicate national team as defined under FIFA eligibility rules; some limited exceptions apply. Players may hold more than one non-FIFA nationality.

No.	Pos.	Nation	Player
—	FW	GEO	Mamuka Ghonghadze (from (Georgia (country)) FC Samgurali Tskaltubo)
—	FW	CMR	Lionnel Franck Djimgou (from (Spain) Xerez CD)
—	FW	LAT	Vladimirs Volkovs (from SK Blāzma)
—	MF	GEO	Georgi Tsakadze (unattached)
—	MF	GEO	Davit Pailodze (unattached)
—	MF	RUS	Yuriy Kostyukov (from (Moldova) FC Dacia Chişinău)
—	GK	LAT	Jevgēņijs Ņerugals (from BFC Daugava-2)
—	FW	LAT	Māris Jasvins (from BFC Daugava-2)
—	DF	LAT	Rolands Jankovskis (from BFC Daugava-2)

Out: Note: Flags indicate national team as defined under FIFA eligibility rules; some limited exceptions apply. Players may hold more than one non-FIFA nationality.

No.	Pos.	Nation	Player
—	FW	LAT	Vitālijs Ziļs (released)
—	MF	LAT	Pāvels Koļcovs (on loan to FK Jaunība)
—	MF	LAT	Aleksejs Kuplovs-Oginskis (on loan to FK Jaunība)
—	MF	RUS	Murad Ramazanov (to (Russia) FC Rotor Volgograd)
—	MF	UKR	Igor Dudnik (released)
—	FW	UKR	Andriy Poroshyn (released)
—	MF	PRK	Hong Kum Song (released)
—	MF	PRK	Ri Myong Jun (released)
—	DF	LAT	Maksims Denisevičs (posthumous)
