= List of Latvian football transfers winter 2010–11 =

This is a list of Latvian football transfers in the 2010–2011 winter transfer window by club. Only transfers of the Virsliga are included.

All transfers mentioned are shown in the external links at the bottom of the page. If you want to insert a transfer that isn't shown there, please add a reference.

== Latvian Higher League ==
=== Skonto ===
In: Note: Flags indicate national team as defined under FIFA eligibility rules; some limited exceptions apply. Players may hold more than one non-FIFA nationality.

No.	Pos.	Nation	Player
--	GK	LAT	Jānis Skābardis (on emergency loan from FK Auda)
--	MF	LAT	Andrejs Sinicins (from Olimps/RFS)
--	FW	LAT	Elvis Stuglis (from Olimps/RFS)
--	FW	LAT	Artūrs Karašausks (loan return from (Ukraine) Dnipro Dnipropetrovsk)
--	DF	LAT	Deniss Kačanovs (free agent)
--	MF	BRA	Fabinho (from (Cyprus) Ermis Aradippou)
--	FW	LAT	Valērijs Šabala (from Olimps/RFS)
--	MF	LAT	Vladimirs Koļesņičenko (free agent)
--	MF	LAT	Juris Laizāns (free agent)
--	FW	RUS	Andrey Nikolaev (from (Russia) FC Nizhny Novgorod)
--	FW	RSA	Bally Smart (from (England) Charlton Athletic)

Out: Note: Flags indicate national team as defined under FIFA eligibility rules; some limited exceptions apply. Players may hold more than one non-FIFA nationality.

No.	Pos.	Nation	Player
3	MF	LAT	Vitālijs Astafjevs (retired)
10	MF	LAT	Aleksandrs Cauņa (on loan to (Russia) CSKA Moscow)
11	MF	LAT	Andrejs Perepļotkins (to (Uzbekistan) Nasaf Qarshi)
13	FW	LAT	Daniils Turkovs (to (Hungary) Zalaegerszegi TE)
21	FW	BLR	Aliaksandr Perepechko (to (Belarus) Dinamo Minsk)
22	DF	LAT	Deniss Petrenko (to FK Jelgava)
24	FW	GEO	David Janelidze (to (Poland) Wigry Suwałki)
27	GK	GER	Michael Kaltenhauser (on loan to (Estonia) Sillamäe Kalev)

=== Ventspils ===
In: Note: Flags indicate national team as defined under FIFA eligibility rules; some limited exceptions apply. Players may hold more than one non-FIFA nationality.

No.	Pos.	Nation	Player
--	GK	RUS	Arbi Mezhiev (from FC Tranzit)
--	DF	LAT	Vitālijs Barinovs (from FC Tranzit)
--	MF	LAT	Oļegs Žatkins (from FK Jūrmala-VV)
--	DF	LAT	Igors Savčenkovs (loan return from FK Jelgava)
--	MF	LAT	Pāvels Hohlovs (loan return from FK Jelgava)
--	MF	LAT	Ivans Visockis (from FC Tranzit)
--	FW	LAT	Kaspars Svārups (from FC Tranzit)
--	MF	LAT	Oļegs Laizāns (from Gulbene-2005)
--	MF	LAT	Vladimirs Mukins (from FC Tranzit)
--	DF	JPN	Naoya Shibamura (from (Japan) Gainare Tottori)
--	DF	LAT	Edgars Vērdiņš (from FC Tranzit)
--	MF	JPN	Minori Sato (from (Mexico) Puebla F.C.)
--	MF	RUS	Eduard Sukhanov (from (Russia) Rubin-2 Kazan)
--	FW	RUS	Sergey Shumilin (loan return from (Ukraine) Kryvbas Kryvyi Rih)
--	FW	URU	Federico Martinez (from Singapore Armed Forces FC)

Out: Note: Flags indicate national team as defined under FIFA eligibility rules; some limited exceptions apply. Players may hold more than one non-FIFA nationality.

No.	Pos.	Nation	Player
2	DF	RUS	Mikhail Mischenko (loan return to (Russia) Rubin Kazan)
3	DF	LAT	Ritus Krjauklis (to (Azerbaijan) AZAL PFC Baku)
6	DF	CMR	Serge Tatiefang (to (Lithuania) FK Banga Gargždai)
7	MF	LAT	Jurijs Žigajevs (to (Poland) Widzew Łódź)
10	MF	LAT	Aleksejs Višņakovs (to (Poland) Cracovia)
11	MF	MDA	Alexandru Dedov (to (Moldova) Dacia Chişinău)
15	DF	RUS	Grigory Chirkin (to (Czech Republic) Dynamo České Budějovice)
17	MF	LAT	Arturs Zjuzins (to (Slovakia) MŠK Žilina)
18	DF	RUS	Vladislav Kryuchkov (to (Russia) Baltika Kaliningrad)
19	MF	LAT	Deniss Tarasovs (released)
21	DF	LAT	Nauris Bulvītis (to (Slovakia) Spartak Trnava)
21	DF	LAT	Oļegs Baikovs (released)
32	FW	LAT	Andrejs Butriks (to FK Jūrmala-VV)
34	DF	LAT	Vitālijs Stols (to Gulbene-2005)
—	FW	RUS	Sergey Shumilin (to (Russia) Dynamo Barnaul)

=== Liepājas Metalurgs ===
In: Note: Flags indicate national team as defined under FIFA eligibility rules; some limited exceptions apply. Players may hold more than one non-FIFA nationality.

No.	Pos.	Nation	Player
--	MF	LAT	Genādijs Soloņicins (free agent)
--	MF	LAT	Roberts Savaļnieks (from Liepājas Metalurgs-2)
--	DF	LAT	Toms Mežs (loan return from Gulbene-2005)
--	FW	LAT	Vladimirs Kamešs (loan return from Gulbene-2005)
--	DF	LAT	Artjoms Kuzņecovs (loan return from (Lithuania) Tauras Tauragė)
--	MF	LTU	Nerijus Valskis (on loan from (Lithuania) FBK Kaunas)
--	FW	LAT	Dmitrijs Hmizs (from Liepājas Metalurgs-2)
--	MF	LTU	Marius Činikas (from (Lithuania) FBK Kaunas)
--	GK	LAT	Edgars Potapenko (from Liepājas Metalurgs-2)
--	DF	LAT	Reinis Flaksis (from Liepājas Metalurgs-2)
--	DF	LAT	Agris Otaņķis (from Liepājas Metalurgs-2)
--	DF	LAT	Endijs Šlampe (from Liepājas Metalurgs-2)
--	MF	LAT	Toms Gucs (from Liepājas Metalurgs-2)
--	FW	LAT	Ēriks Punculs (from Liepājas Metalurgs-2)
--	FW	LAT	Dāvis Ikaunieks (from Liepājas Metalurgs-2)

Out: Note: Flags indicate national team as defined under FIFA eligibility rules; some limited exceptions apply. Players may hold more than one non-FIFA nationality.

No.	Pos.	Nation	Player
2	DF	JPN	Takafumi Akahoshi (to (Poland) Pogoń Szczecin)
7	MF	LAT	Maksims Rafaļskis (to (Russia) Baltika Kaliningrad)
10	FW	LAT	Deniss Rakels (to (Poland) Zagłębie Lubin)
14	FW	LAT	Intars Kirhners (to FK Jūrmala-VV)
16	MF	LTU	Darius Miceika (to (Russia) FC Khimki)
23	FW	LAT	Kristaps Grebis (to (Azerbaijan) FK Gence)
25	DF	BRA	Jhonnes (to (Hungary) Újpest FC)
87	DF	CRO	Jurica Puljiz (released)

=== Daugava ===
In: Note: Flags indicate national team as defined under FIFA eligibility rules; some limited exceptions apply. Players may hold more than one non-FIFA nationality.

No.	Pos.	Nation	Player
--	DF	RUS	Georgi Ulyanov (from (Russia) Sheksna Cherepovets)
--	FW	LAT	Jans Radevičs (loan return from Gulbene-2005)
--	FW	RUS	Dmitri Kozlov (from (Russia) Avangard Kursk)
--	MF	LAT	Pāvels Koļcovs (loan return from Jauniba Riga)
—	MF	LAT	Aleksejs Kuplovs-Oginskis (loan return from Jauniba Riga)
--	FW	LAT	Dmitrijs Vorobjovs (loan return from Gulbene-2005)
--	MF	UKR	Konstantin Matsion (from FK Jūrmala-VV)
--	DF	GEO	Bidzina Tsintsadze (from (Georgia (country)) Spartaki Tskhinvali)
--	MF	LAT	Edgars Jermolajevs (from FK Jūrmala-VV)
--	MF	UKR	Ihor Dudnyk (from (Ukraine) Feniks-Illichovets Kalinine)

Out: Note: Flags indicate national team as defined under FIFA eligibility rules; some limited exceptions apply. Players may hold more than one non-FIFA nationality.

No.	Pos.	Nation	Player
—	MF	LAT	Pāvels Koļcovs (to FC Jūrmala)
--	MF	LAT	Aleksejs Kuplovs-Oginskis (released)
—	FW	LAT	Māris Jasvins (to BFC Daugava)
2	MF	GEO	Georgi Tsakadze (released)
10	MF	GEO	Davit Pailodze (to BFC Daugava)
12	GK	LAT	Vadims Fjodorovs (released)
21	FW	CMR	Lionnel Franck Djimgou (released)
16	FW	LAT	Ēriks Kokins (on loan to Gulbene-2005)
24	DF	RUS	Yuriy Kotyukov (on loan to Gulbene-2005)

=== Jūrmala-VV ===
In: Note: Flags indicate national team as defined under FIFA eligibility rules; some limited exceptions apply. Players may hold more than one non-FIFA nationality.

No.	Pos.	Nation	Player
--	GK	RUS	Sergei Kosov (from (Lithuania) FK Šiauliai)
--	MF	LAT	Romāns Bezzubovs (from (Albania) KS Bylis Ballsh)
--	FW	LAT	Intars Kirhners (from Liepājas Metalurgs)
--	MF	RUS	Ruslan Gazzaev (from (Russia) FC Taganrog)
--	DF	LAT	Raivis Hščanovičs (free agent)
--	MF	LAT	Romāns Mickevičs (from FC Tranzit)
--	MF	LAT	Deniss Ostrovskis (from FS Metta-LU)
--	DF	UKR	Oleksandr Krutskevich (from (Ukraine) Feniks-Illichovets Kalinino)
--	FW	LAT	Andrejs Butriks (from FK Ventspils)
--	DF	RUS	Nariman Gusalov (from (Russia) Alania Vladikavkaz)
--	FW	RUS	Karen Oganjan (from (Russia) Alania Vladikavkaz)

Out: Note: Flags indicate national team as defined under FIFA eligibility rules; some limited exceptions apply. Players may hold more than one non-FIFA nationality.

No.	Pos.	Nation	Player
6	MF	UKR	Konstantin Matsion (to Daugava Daugavpils)
8	FW	LAT	Ruslans Agafonovs (to Olimps/RFS)
10	MF	LAT	Oļegs Žatkins (to FK Ventspils)
11	MF	LAT	Aleksandrs Zeņkovs (to FC Jūrmala)
17	DF	EST	Vladislav Tsurilkin (released)
17	FW	LAT	Grigorijs Batmanovs (released)
20	FW	LAT	Dmitrijs Paplavskis (to FC Jūrmala)
21	GK	RUS	Dmitri Chigazov (released)
22	MF	LAT	Edgars Jermolajevs (to Daugava Daugavpils)
26	FW	LAT	Igors Avanesovs (to Spartaks)
30	GK	LAT	Georgs Atvars (retired)

=== Jelgava ===
In: Note: Flags indicate national team as defined under FIFA eligibility rules; some limited exceptions apply. Players may hold more than one non-FIFA nationality.

No.	Pos.	Nation	Player
--	MF	LAT	Artjoms Lonščakovs (from (Germany) 1. FC Neubrandenburg 04)
--	DF	LAT	Jurijs Ksenzovs (from (Azerbaijan) PFC Turan Tovuz)
--	MF	LAT	Aleksandrs Kļimovs (from Olimps/RFS)
--	DF	LAT	Dmitrijs Daņilovs (from Olimps/RFS)
--	DF	LAT	Valdis Kaļva (from SK Blāzma)
--	DF	LAT	Deniss Petrenko (from Skonto)
--	FW	LAT	Harijs Cepurītis (from FS Metta-LU)
--	DF	LAT	Māris Savinovs (loan return from Jauniba Riga)
--	DF	LAT	Mārcis Savinovs (loan return from Jauniba Riga)
--	GK	LAT	Edgars Andrejevs (from Jelgava-2)
--	FW	COL	David Armero Cortes (from (Colombia) Atlético Huila)
--	DF	LAT	Mārcis Ošs (from Jelgava-2)
--	MF	LAT	Aldis Trukšāns (from Jelgava-2)
--	GK	LAT	Niks Rubezis (from Auda)

Out: Note: Flags indicate national team as defined under FIFA eligibility rules; some limited exceptions apply. Players may hold more than one non-FIFA nationality.

No.	Pos.	Nation	Player
3	DF	LAT	Eduards Martins (to FS Metta-LU)
4	DF	LAT	Oļegs Ivaņica (released)
5	DF	LAT	Vitālijs Lapkovskis (released)
6	MF	LAT	Pāvels Bormakovs (retired)
8	FW	LAT	Ēriks Pelcis (retired)
11	MF	LAT	Viktors Rezjapkins (retired)
12	MF	LAT	Jaroslavs Zoricovs (to FS Metta-LU)
14	MF	JPN	Jumpei Shimmura (released)
18	FW	LAT	Dmitrijs Borisovs (to (Lithuania) Tauras Tauragė)
19	MF	LAT	Vitālijs Petkevičs (to Tukums 2000)
20	MF	LAT	Dmitrijs Medeckis (released)
23	DF	USA	Nate Weiss (to (Sweden) Tenhults IF)
25	DF	LAT	Igors Savčenkovs (loan return to FK Ventspils)
33	GK	LAT	Aleksandrs Čumakovs (retired)
89	MF	LAT	Pāvels Hohlovs (loan return to FK Ventspils)

=== Blāzma ===
In: Note: Flags indicate national team as defined under FIFA eligibility rules; some limited exceptions apply. Players may hold more than one non-FIFA nationality.

No.	Pos.	Nation	Player
--	MF	BLR	Artem Vaskov (loan return from (Belarus) FC Gomel)

Out: Note: Flags indicate national team as defined under FIFA eligibility rules; some limited exceptions apply. Players may hold more than one non-FIFA nationality.

No.	Pos.	Nation	Player
1	GK	LAT	Vitālijs Meļņičenko (to (Hungary) Szolnoki MÁV)
2	DF	LAT	Dmitrijs Halvitovs (to (Lithuania) Tauras Tauragė)
6	DF	LAT	Valdis Kaļva (to FK Jelgava)
7	FW	LAT	Artjoms Osipovs (to Olimps/RFS)
?	MF	LAT	Krišjānis Vallers (to (Greece) Megas Alexandros)
?	MF	BLR	Artem Vaskov (on loan to (Belarus) FC Vitebsk)
10	FW	LAT	Guntars Silagailis (to (Israel) Ahva Arraba)
18	FW	LAT	Artis Novickis (to Gulbene-2005)
44	DF	LAT	Deniss Sokoļskis (to FC Jūrmala)
88	DF	LAT	Vadims Javoišs (to FC Jūrmala)

=== Olimps/RFS ===
In: Note: Flags indicate national team as defined under FIFA eligibility rules; some limited exceptions apply. Players may hold more than one non-FIFA nationality.

No.	Pos.	Nation	Player
--	GK	LAT	Dāvis Varakājs (from youth system on emergency loan)
--	DF	LAT	Andrejs Kaļiņins (from FC Jūrmala)
--	DF	LAT	Toms Rajeckis (from youth system)
--	FW	LAT	Nikolajs Zaicevs (from FC Tranzit)
--	MF	RUS	Anton Volkov (from (Russia) FC Volga Tver)
--	MF	GEO	Paata Baladze (free agent)
--	FW	GEO	Toma Tabatadze (free agent)
--	FW	LAT	Artjoms Osipovs (from SK Blāzma)
--	FW	LAT	Ruslans Agafonovs (from FK Jūrmala-VV)
--	MF	LAT	Alans Zeltiņš (from youth system)
--	GK	LAT	Artūrs Kovaļovs (from youth system)
--	MF	LAT	Sandis Bokta (from youth system)
--	FW	LAT	Jānis Jurevics (from youth system)
--	MF	LAT	Daniels Bērenfelds (from youth system)
--	MF	LAT	Vitālijs Rukols (from youth system)
--	MF	LAT	Aleksandrs Urbanovičs (from youth system)

Out: Note: Flags indicate national team as defined under FIFA eligibility rules; some limited exceptions apply. Players may hold more than one non-FIFA nationality.

No.	Pos.	Nation	Player
4	DF	GEO	Lasha Gongadze (to (Poland) Wigry Suwałki)
4	DF	LAT	Andrejs Kostjuks (released)
5	DF	LAT	Artūrs Kļimovičs (released)
6	DF	LAT	Konstantīns Budilovs (to FC Jūrmala)
7	MF	LAT	Aleksandrs Kļimovs (to FK Jelgava)
8	MF	LAT	Artūrs Magejenkovs (released)
9	FW	LAT	Valērijs Šabala (to Skonto)
10	MF	LAT	Andrejs Siņicins (to Skonto)
11	FW	UKR	Oleksandr Nazarchuk (on loan to (Ukraine) Nyva Vinnytsia)
14	MF	LAT	Viktors Kurma (to FK Daugava Riga)
15	FW	LAT	Kirils Grigorovs (to FC Jūrmala)
16	DF	LAT	Dmitrijs Daņilovs (to FK Jelgava)
18	FW	LAT	Elvis Stuglis (to Skonto)
—	GK	LAT	Andrejs Piedels (retired)

=== Gulbene-2005 ===
In: Note: Flags indicate national team as defined under FIFA eligibility rules; some limited exceptions apply. Players may hold more than one non-FIFA nationality.

No.	Pos.	Nation	Player
--	MF	GEO	David Tsiskarishvili (from (Georgia (country)) WIT Georgia)
--	MF	ARM	Arevshat Khachatryan (from Daugava Riga)
--	FW	LAT	Artis Novickis (from SK Blāzma)
--	DF	LAT	Vitālijs Stols (from FK Ventspils)
--	MF	BIH	Ivan Šarac (from (Croatia) NK HAŠK)
--	FW	LAT	Ēriks Kokins (on loan from Daugava Daugavpils)
--	DF	RUS	Yuriy Kotyukov (on loan from Daugava Daugavpils)
--	DF	LAT	Artjoms Murdasovs (from BFC Daugava)
--	MF	JPN	Yasuhiro Kato (from (Thailand) Army United F.C.)
--	MF	LAT	Kristaps Priedēns (from FK Daugava Riga)
--	MF	GEO	Ilia Sordia (from (Georgia (country)) FC Dila Gori)
--	MF	LAT	Jānis Rubenis (from FK Smiltene)
--	FW	LAT	Elvis Teremko (from FK Smiltene)
--	FW	LAT	Edgars Jansons (from FK Smiltene)
--	MF	LAT	Jānis Keišs (from youth system)
--	FW	LAT	Emīls Bisenieks (from youth system)
--	FW	LAT	Emīls Grāvlejs (from youth system)

Out: Note: Flags indicate national team as defined under FIFA eligibility rules; some limited exceptions apply. Players may hold more than one non-FIFA nationality.

No.	Pos.	Nation	Player
—	MF	JPN	Minori Sato (loan return to (Mexico) Puebla F.C.)
—	GK	LAT	Dainis Nalivaiko (released)
—	DF	LAT	Edijs Aleksāns (released)
—	DF	LAT	Maksims Firsovs (released)
—	MF	LAT	Igors Tolkačs (released)
—	MF	LAT	Mikus Rubenis (released)
—	MF	LAT	Krišjānis Dinsbergs (released)
—	FW	LAT	Arnis Ivanovs (released)
—	FW	LAT	Valērijs Sircovs (released)
—	FW	LAT	Valentīns Surovs (released)
4	DF	LAT	Toms Mežs (loan return to Liepājas Metalurgs)
8	DF	LAT	Staņislavs Pihockis (to (Lithuania) Kruoja Pakruojis)
9	FW	LAT	Vladimirs Kamešs (loan return to Liepājas Metalurgs)
12	FW	CHI	Carlos Mansilla (released)
14	MF	LAT	Oļegs Laizāns (to FK Ventspils)
15	MF	LAT	Nils Sitenkovs (released)
19	FW	LAT	Dmitrijs Vorobjovs (loan return to Daugava Daugavpils)
20	FW	LAT	Jans Radevičs (loan return to Daugava Daugavpils)

=== Jūrmala ===
In: Note: Flags indicate national team as defined under FIFA eligibility rules; some limited exceptions apply. Players may hold more than one non-FIFA nationality.

No.	Pos.	Nation	Player
--	DF	LAT	Konstantīns Budilovs (from Olimps/RFS)
--	MF	CMR	Jean Bouli (from (Russia) Luch-Energiya Vladivostok)
--	MF	RUS	Konstantin Belov (on loan from (Russia) FK Khimki)
--	FW	LAT	Kirils Grigorovs (from Olimps/RFS)
--	MF	RUS	Igor Dragunov (from (Russia) CSKA Moscow)
--	MF	CMR	Jocelyn Enam Abada (free agent)
--	MF	LAT	Vadims Gospodars (from (Belarus) FC Vitebsk)
--	FW	RUS	Pavel Kiryanov (from (Russia) FC Nika Moscow)
--	MF	LAT	Pāvels Koļcovs (from Daugava Daugavpils)
--	MF	LAT	Jevgēņijs Koršakovs (free agent)
--	DF	RUS	Marat Magkeev (from (Russia) Dynamo Bryansk)
--	GK	LAT	Pāvels Naglis (from (Lithuania) FK Šiauliai)
--	DF	NGR	Daniel Ola (from (Indonesia) Persebaya Surabaya)
--	FW	LAT	Dmitrijs Paplavskis (from FK Jūrmala-VV)
--	DF	LAT	Deniss Sokoļskis (from SK Blāzma)
--	GK	LAT	Maksims Vitkovskis (from (Lithuania) FK Mažeikiai)
--	DF	LAT	Vadims Javoišs (from SK Blāzma)
--	MF	LAT	Aleksandrs Zeņkovs (from FK Jūrmala-VV)

Out: Note: Flags indicate national team as defined under FIFA eligibility rules; some limited exceptions apply. Players may hold more than one non-FIFA nationality.

No.	Pos.	Nation	Player
—	DF	LAT	Artjoms Naruševičs (to Daugava Riga)
—	DF	LAT	Vitālijs Goreckis (to Daugava Riga)
—	DF	LAT	Andrejs Kaļiņins (to Olimps/RFS)
—	FW	LAT	Vugar Askerov (to SFK Varavīksne)
