= List of Latvian football transfers summer 2011 =

This is a list of Latvian football transfers in the 2011 summer transfer window by club. Only transfers of the Virsliga and 1 liga are included.

All transfers mentioned are shown in the external links at the bottom of the page. If you wish to insert a transfer that isn't mentioned there, please add a reference.

== Latvian Higher League ==
=== Skonto ===
In: Note: Flags indicate national team as defined under FIFA eligibility rules; some limited exceptions apply. Players may hold more than one non-FIFA nationality.

No.	Pos.	Nation	Player
5	DF	(Georgia (country)) GEO	Ivane Kandelaki (from (Georgia (country)) Metalurgi Rustavi)
10	MF	(Japan) JPN	Minori Sato (from Ventspils)
10	MF	(Latvia) LVA	Aleksandrs Cauņa (loan return from (Russia) CSKA Moscow)
24	FW	(Russia) RUS	Anton Volkov (from Olimps)
—	FW	(Nigeria) NGA	Chinedu Simeon Anajah (from (Nigeria) Kwara Football Academy)
—	GK	(Latvia) LVA	Oskars Darģis (from Olimps)
—	FW	(Nigeria) NGA	James Aije Nche (from (Nigeria) Kwara Football Academy)
—	MF	(Latvia) LVA	Artjoms Lonščakovs (from Jelgava)

Out: Note: Flags indicate national team as defined under FIFA eligibility rules; some limited exceptions apply. Players may hold more than one non-FIFA nationality.

No.	Pos.	Nation	Player
2	DF	(Latvia) LVA	Vadims Gaiļus (on loan to Olimps)
5	MF	(Latvia) LVA	Juris Laizāns (to (Russia) Fakel Voronezh)
8	DF	(Latvia) LVA	Deniss Kačanovs (to (Indonesia) Persema Malang)
10	MF	(Latvia) LVA	Aleksandrs Cauņa (to (Russia) CSKA Moscow)
21	MF	(Latvia) LVA	Vladimirs Koļesņičenko (retired)
—	MF	(Latvia) LVA	Artjoms Lonščakovs (on loan to Olimps)

=== Ventspils ===
In: Note: Flags indicate national team as defined under FIFA eligibility rules; some limited exceptions apply. Players may hold more than one non-FIFA nationality.

No.	Pos.	Nation	Player
2	DF	(Russia) RUS	Pavel Mochalin (from (Russia) Spartak Nalchik)
3	DF	(Latvia) LVA	Antons Kurakins (from (Scotland) Celtic)
7	FW	(Latvia) LVA	Nikolajs Kozačuks (from (Israel) Ahva Arraba)
11	MF	(Japan) JPN	Yasuhiro Kato (from Gulbene)
20	FW	(Russia) RUS	Vadim Yanchuk (from (Russia) Ufa)
21	DF	(Latvia) LVA	Igors Barinovs (from Ventspils-2)
27	GK	(Latvia) LVA	Andris Zabusovs (from Ventspils-2)
82	DF	(Russia) RUS	Mikhail Badyautdinov (from (Russia) Spartak Moscow)
—	MF	(Georgia (country)) GEO	Sergo Kavtaradze (from (Lithuania) Klaipedos Futbolo akademija)
—	FW	(Latvia) LVA	Jurijs Bespalovs (free agent)
—	FW	(Latvia) LVA	Edijs Joksts (from Tukums 2000)
—	GK	(Latvia) LVA	Romāns Maksimovs (from Tukums 2000)
—	FW	(Latvia) LVA	Edgars Omeļjaņenko (from Tukums 2000)

Out: Note: Flags indicate national team as defined under FIFA eligibility rules; some limited exceptions apply. Players may hold more than one non-FIFA nationality.

No.	Pos.	Nation	Player
6	MF	(Japan) JPN	Minori Sato (to Skonto)
8	MF	(Nigeria) NGA	Michael Tukura (on loan to (Russia) Rubin Kazan)
19	MF	(Latvia) LVA	Deniss Tarasovs (on loan to Spartaks)
20	MF	(Latvia) LVA	Romāns Bespalovs (on loan to Jelgava)
27	MF	(Latvia) LVA	Visvaldis Ignatāns (on loan to Jelgava)
32	FW	(Cameroon) CMR	Michel Bertrand Mvondo Maki (to (Malta) Mosta)
82	MF	(Latvia) LVA	Pāvels Hohlovs (to (Poland) Polonia Leszno)
—	FW	(Latvia) LVA	Edijs Joksts (on loan to Ventspils-2)
—	GK	(Latvia) LVA	Romāns Maksimovs (on loan to Ventspils-2)
—	FW	(Latvia) LVA	Edgars Omeļjaņenko (on loan to Ventspils-2)

=== Liepājas Metalurgs ===
In: Note: Flags indicate national team as defined under FIFA eligibility rules; some limited exceptions apply. Players may hold more than one non-FIFA nationality.

No.	Pos.	Nation	Player
23	FW	(Azerbaijan) AZE	Vugar Askherov (from Varavīksne)
87	DF	(Latvia) LVA	Ritus Krjauklis (from (Azerbaijan) AZAL Baku)
—	DF	(Latvia) LVA	Reinis Flaksis (loan return from Liepājas Metalurgs-2)
—	DF	(Latvia) LVA	Agris Otaņķis (loan return from Liepājas Metalurgs-2)
—	DF	(Latvia) LVA	Endijs Šlampe (loan return from Liepājas Metalurgs-2)

Out: Note: Flags indicate national team as defined under FIFA eligibility rules; some limited exceptions apply. Players may hold more than one non-FIFA nationality.

No.	Pos.	Nation	Player

=== Daugava ===
In: Note: Flags indicate national team as defined under FIFA eligibility rules; some limited exceptions apply. Players may hold more than one non-FIFA nationality.

No.	Pos.	Nation	Player
4	DF	(Russia) RUS	Yuriy Kotyukov (loan return from Gulbene)
10	FW	(Brazil) BRA	Severino (from (Poland) Górnik Łęczna)
16	FW	(Latvia) LVA	Ēriks Kokins (loan return from Gulbene)
21	MF	(Brazil) BRA	Allanzinho (from (Brazil) America)
26	DF	(Latvia) LVA	Vladimirs Žavoronkovs (free agent)

Out: Note: Flags indicate national team as defined under FIFA eligibility rules; some limited exceptions apply. Players may hold more than one non-FIFA nationality.

No.	Pos.	Nation	Player
4	DF	(Ukraine) UKR	Konstantin Matsion (to (Lithuania) Kruoja Pakruojis)
7	MF	(Ukraine) UKR	Ihor Dudnyk (to (Ukraine) Metalurh Zaporizhya)
10	FW	(Latvia) LVA	Dmitrijs Vorobjovs (to (Estonia) Narva Trans)
21	FW	(Russia) RUS	Dmitri Kozlov (to (Moldova) Zimbru Chişinău)

=== Jūrmala-VV ===
In: Note: Flags indicate national team as defined under FIFA eligibility rules; some limited exceptions apply. Players may hold more than one non-FIFA nationality.

No.	Pos.	Nation	Player
11	MF	(Brazil) BRA	Leonardo (from (Brazil) Mesquita)
11	MF	(Georgia (country)) GEO	Giorgi Diakvishvili (from (Georgia (country)) Lokomotivi Tbilisi)
14	MF	(Latvia) LVA	Aleksejs Tarasovs (from Ventspils-2)
19	DF	(Russia) RUS	Iosif Solomonov (from (Russia) Dagdizel Kaspiysk)
20	FW	(Latvia) LVA	Jānis Krasovskis (from Sigulda)
20	MF	(Georgia (country)) GEO	Zurab Kurdobadze (from (Georgia (country)) Olimpi Rustavi)
22	MF	(Latvia) LVA	Vladimirs Babičevs (free agent)
86	GK	(Estonia) EST	Mihhail Lavrentjev (from (Estonia) Legion Tallinn)

Out: Note: Flags indicate national team as defined under FIFA eligibility rules; some limited exceptions apply. Players may hold more than one non-FIFA nationality.

No.	Pos.	Nation	Player
1	GK	(Latvia) LVA	Artūrs Biezais (to Spartaks)
10	FW	(Latvia) LVA	Mareks Zuntners (to (Germany) Türkiyemspor Berlin)
11	FW	(Latvia) LVA	Intars Kirhners (to Jūrmala)
14	MF	(Latvia) LVA	Valērijs Čistjakovs (to (Lithuania) Kruoja Pakruojis)
15	DF	(Russia) RUS	Nariman Gusalov (to (Russia) Avangard Kursk)
17	FW	(Latvia) LVA	Andrejs Butriks (to (Greece) Anagennisi Epanomi)
19	MF	(Latvia) LVA	Rolands Krjauklis (to Jūrmala)
20	MF	(Latvia) LVA	Romāns Mickevičs (to Spartaks)
21	FW	(Russia) RUS	Karen Oganyan (to (Russia) Luch-Energiya Vladivostok)
22	MF	(Russia) RUS	Ruslan Gazzayev (released)
23	FW	(Latvia) LVA	Gatis Kalniņš (to Jelgava)
35	GK	(Russia) RUS	Sergei Kosov (released)

=== Jelgava ===
In: Note: Flags indicate national team as defined under FIFA eligibility rules; some limited exceptions apply. Players may hold more than one non-FIFA nationality.

No.	Pos.	Nation	Player
11	FW	(Latvia) LVA	Gatis Kalniņš (from Jūrmala-VV)
15	MF	(Latvia) LVA	Visvaldis Ignatāns (on loan from Ventspils)
20	MF	(Latvia) LVA	Romāns Bespalovs (on loan from Ventspils)
28	FW	(Belarus) BLR	Ales Navumik (from (Belarus) Dinamo Minsk)
89	DF	(Latvia) LVA	Aleksandrs Baturinskis (from Ventspils-2)

Out: Note: Flags indicate national team as defined under FIFA eligibility rules; some limited exceptions apply. Players may hold more than one non-FIFA nationality.

No.	Pos.	Nation	Player
10	FW	(Latvia) LVA	Oļegs Malašenoks (to (Russia) Volgar-Gazprom Astrakhan)
11	DF	(Latvia) LVA	Mārcis Savinovs (to (Malta) Birkirkara)
14	MF	(Latvia) LVA	Artjoms Lonščakovs (to Skonto)
24	FW	(Latvia) LVA	Harijs Cepurītis (to Olimps)
27	FW	(Colombia) COL	David Armero Cortés (to Spartaks)

=== Olimps ===
In: Note: Flags indicate national team as defined under FIFA eligibility rules; some limited exceptions apply. Players may hold more than one non-FIFA nationality.

No.	Pos.	Nation	Player
2	DF	(Latvia) LVA	Vadims Gaiļus (on loan from Skonto)
8	DF	(Georgia (country)) GEO	Lasha Gongadze (from (Poland) Wigry Suwałki)
10	FW	(Georgia (country)) GEO	David Janelidze (from (Poland) Wigry Suwałki)
12	GK	(Latvia) LVA	Jevgēņijs Laizāns (free agent)
13	MF	(Latvia) LVA	Raimonds Langins (from reserves)
14	MF	(Latvia) LVA	Vladislavs Glutkovskis (from reserves)
18	FW	(Latvia) LVA	Harijs Cepurītis (from Jelgava)
—	MF	(Latvia) LVA	Artjoms Lonščakovs (on loan from Skonto)
—		(Russia) RUS	Dmitri Kudelin (from (Russia) Torpedo Moscow)
—		(Russia) RUS	Ivan Gorjainov (from (Russia) Torpedo Moscow)
—	MF	(Ukraine) UKR	Borys Taschy (from (Ukraine) Chornomorets Odesa)

Out: Note: Flags indicate national team as defined under FIFA eligibility rules; some limited exceptions apply. Players may hold more than one non-FIFA nationality.

No.	Pos.	Nation	Player
6	MF	(Georgia (country)) GEO	Giorgi Chikhisvili (released)
7	FW	(Latvia) LVA	Ruslans Agafonovs (to RFS)
8	FW	(Russia) RUS	Anton Volkov (to Skonto)
10	FW	(Georgia (country)) GEO	Toma Tabatadze (to (Lithuania) Kruoja Pakruojis)
12	GK	(Latvia) LVA	Oskars Darģis (to Skonto)
—	MF	(Ukraine) UKR	Borys Taschy (to (Russia) Dynamo Moscow)

=== Gulbene ===
In: Note: Flags indicate national team as defined under FIFA eligibility rules; some limited exceptions apply. Players may hold more than one non-FIFA nationality.

No.	Pos.	Nation	Player
4	MF	(Latvia) LVA	Krišjānis Vallers (from (Greece) Megas Alexandros)
5	MF	(Japan) JPN	Masaki Hemmi (from Sevilla Puerto Rico)
8	MF	(Georgia (country)) GEO	Shalva Purtseladze (from (Georgia (country)) Samtredia)
9	MF	(Georgia (country)) GEO	Nukri Gogokhia (from (Georgia (country)) 35-th FS Tbilisi)
10	FW	(Japan) JPN	Hideaki Takeda (from (United States) Indiana Invaders)
13	FW	(Georgia (country)) GEO	Irakli Arveladze (from (Georgia (country)) 35-th FS Tbilisi)
20	MF	(Latvia) LVA	Reinis Sebris (from Smiltene)
—	FW	(Japan) JPN	Masakatsu Taga (from (Canada) Thunder Bay Chill)

Out: Note: Flags indicate national team as defined under FIFA eligibility rules; some limited exceptions apply. Players may hold more than one non-FIFA nationality.

No.	Pos.	Nation	Player
4	DF	(Latvia) LVA	Artjoms Murdasovs (released)
5	MF	(Japan) JPN	Yasuhiro Kato (to Ventspils)
8	MF	(Georgia (country)) GEO	Ilia Sordia (released)
9	MF	(Bosnia and Herzegovina) BIH	Ivan Šarac (to (Bosnia and Herzegovina) Brotnjo)
10	FW	(Latvia) LVA	Ivans Sputajs (to Jūrmala)
11	DF	(Russia) RUS	Yuriy Kotyukov (loan return to Daugava)
16	FW	(Latvia) LVA	Ēriks Kokins (loan return to Daugava)
20	FW	(Latvia) LVA	Artis Novickis (released)
—	MF	(Belarus) BLR	Vladimir Kopcha (to (Germany) Makkabi Berlin)

=== Jūrmala ===
In: Note: Flags indicate national team as defined under FIFA eligibility rules; some limited exceptions apply. Players may hold more than one non-FIFA nationality.

No.	Pos.	Nation	Player
11	FW	(Latvia) LVA	Intars Kirhners (from Jūrmala-VV)
25	FW	(Latvia) LVA	Ivans Sputajs (from Gulbene)
13	DF	(Latvia) LVA	Dmitrijs Halvitovs (from (Lithuania) Tauras Tauragė)
33	FW	(Latvia) LVA	Vīts Rimkus (free agent)
69	FW	(Latvia) LVA	Guntars Silagailis (from (Israel) Ahva Arraba)
91	MF	(Latvia) LVA	Rolands Krjauklis (from Jūrmala-VV)
—	MF	(Latvia) LVA	Vitālijs Rečickis (from (Lithuania) Tauras Tauragė)

Out: Note: Flags indicate national team as defined under FIFA eligibility rules; some limited exceptions apply. Players may hold more than one non-FIFA nationality.

No.	Pos.	Nation	Player
4	DF	(Latvia) LVA	Pāvels Koļcovs (to Daugava-2)
5	DF	(Latvia) LVA	Konstantīns Budilovs (to Spartaks)
11	MF	(Latvia) LVA	Aleksandrs Zeņkovs (to RFS)
13	MF	(Latvia) LVA	Jurijs Idionovs (to Auda)
15	MF	(Cameroon) CMR	Jean Bouli (to (Moldova) Olimpia)
25	DF	(Russia) RUS	Marat Magkeev (to (Russia) Dynamo Stavropol)
27	MF	(Russia) RUS	Igor Dragunov (to (Russia) Pskov-747 Pskov)
69	DF	(Latvia) LVA	Edijs Ivaško (to RFS)
91	MF	(Latvia) LVA	Oskars Ikstens (to RFS)

== Latvian First League ==
=== Rēzeknes BJSS ===
In: Note: Flags indicate national team as defined under FIFA eligibility rules; some limited exceptions apply. Players may hold more than one non-FIFA nationality.

No.	Pos.	Nation	Player
2	DF	(Latvia) LVA	Edgars Kleins (free agent)
8	?	(Latvia) LVA	Pāvels Tarasovs (from Latgales Ceļdaris)
14	DF	(Latvia) LVA	Jevģēnijs Adamjonoks (from Latgales Ceļdaris)
15	?	(Latvia) LVA	Sergejs Kondrats (from Saules puikas)
18	MF	(Latvia) LVA	Edgars Vjalkins (from reserves)
24	?	(Latvia) LVA	Arvils Neško (from reserves)
—	GK	(Latvia) LVA	Aleksejs Maslobojevs (free agent)

Out: Note: Flags indicate national team as defined under FIFA eligibility rules; some limited exceptions apply. Players may hold more than one non-FIFA nationality.

No.	Pos.	Nation	Player

=== Ventspils-2 ===
In: Note: Flags indicate national team as defined under FIFA eligibility rules; some limited exceptions apply. Players may hold more than one non-FIFA nationality.

No.	Pos.	Nation	Player
2	FW	(Latvia) LVA	Edgars Omeļjaņenko (on loan from Ventspils)
16	FW	(Latvia) LVA	Edijs Joksts (on loan from Ventspils)
—	GK	(Latvia) LVA	Romāns Maksimovs (on loan from Ventspils)

Out: Note: Flags indicate national team as defined under FIFA eligibility rules; some limited exceptions apply. Players may hold more than one non-FIFA nationality.

No.	Pos.	Nation	Player
3	DF	(Latvia) LVA	Aleksejs Dimčuks (to (Poland) Polonia Leszno)
4	MF	(Latvia) LVA	Aleksejs Tarasovs (to Jūrmala-VV)
16	GK	(Latvia) LVA	Andris Zabusovs (to Ventspils)
18	DF	(Latvia) LVA	Igors Barinovs (to Ventspils)
26	DF	(Latvia) LVA	Aleksandrs Baturinskis (to Jelgava)
—	FW	(Latvia) LVA	Sergejs Cigankovs (to Tukums 2000)
—	MF	(Latvia) LVA	Daniels Vasiļjevs (to Tukums 2000)

=== Rīgas Futbola skola ===
In: Note: Flags indicate national team as defined under FIFA eligibility rules; some limited exceptions apply. Players may hold more than one non-FIFA nationality.

No.	Pos.	Nation	Player
4	MF	(Latvia) LVA	Oskars Ikstens (from Jūrmala)
11	MF	(Latvia) LVA	Aleksandrs Zeņkovs (from Jūrmala)
16	FW	(Latvia) LVA	Ruslans Agafonovs (from Olimps)
—	DF	(Latvia) LVA	Edijs Ivaško (from Jūrmala)

Out: Note: Flags indicate national team as defined under FIFA eligibility rules; some limited exceptions apply. Players may hold more than one non-FIFA nationality.

No.	Pos.	Nation	Player
2	DF	(Latvia) LVA	Marks Molčanovs (to Auda)

=== Liepājas Metalurgs-2 ===
In: Note: Flags indicate national team as defined under FIFA eligibility rules; some limited exceptions apply. Players may hold more than one non-FIFA nationality.

No.	Pos.	Nation	Player

Out: Note: Flags indicate national team as defined under FIFA eligibility rules; some limited exceptions apply. Players may hold more than one non-FIFA nationality.

No.	Pos.	Nation	Player
2	DF	(Latvia) LVA	Endijs Šlampe (loan return to Liepājas Metalurgs)
5	DF	(Latvia) LVA	Agris Otaņķis (loan return to Liepājas Metalurgs)
6	DF	(Latvia) LVA	Reinis Flaksis (loan return to Liepājas Metalurgs)
17	MF	(Latvia) LVA	Jans Bespjorstovs (on loan to Varavīksne)
—	MF	(Latvia) LVA	Valentīns Doloka (on loan to Varavīksne)
—		(Latvia) LVA	Roberts Dzērve (to Varavīksne)
—	MF	(Latvia) LVA	Nils Sitenkovs (to Varavīksne)

=== METTA/LU ===
In: Note: Flags indicate national team as defined under FIFA eligibility rules; some limited exceptions apply. Players may hold more than one non-FIFA nationality.

No.	Pos.	Nation	Player

Out: Note: Flags indicate national team as defined under FIFA eligibility rules; some limited exceptions apply. Players may hold more than one non-FIFA nationality.

No.	Pos.	Nation	Player

=== Valmiera ===
In: Note: Flags indicate national team as defined under FIFA eligibility rules; some limited exceptions apply. Players may hold more than one non-FIFA nationality.

No.	Pos.	Nation	Player
17	FW	(Latvia) LVA	Nauris Ģērmanis (from Staiceles Bebri)

Out: Note: Flags indicate national team as defined under FIFA eligibility rules; some limited exceptions apply. Players may hold more than one non-FIFA nationality.

No.	Pos.	Nation	Player

=== Auda ===
In: Note: Flags indicate national team as defined under FIFA eligibility rules; some limited exceptions apply. Players may hold more than one non-FIFA nationality.

No.	Pos.	Nation	Player
12	DF	(Latvia) LVA	Marks Molčanovs (from RFS)
13	MF	(Latvia) LVA	Jurijs Idionovs (from Jūrmala)
22	FW	(Latvia) LVA	Intars Stūrāns (from Viesītes SS)
—	DF	(Latvia) LVA	Jānis Skvorcovs (from (England) Eccleshill United)

Out: Note: Flags indicate national team as defined under FIFA eligibility rules; some limited exceptions apply. Players may hold more than one non-FIFA nationality.

No.	Pos.	Nation	Player

=== Daugava-2 ===
In: Note: Flags indicate national team as defined under FIFA eligibility rules; some limited exceptions apply. Players may hold more than one non-FIFA nationality.

No.	Pos.	Nation	Player
7	DF	(Latvia) LVA	Pāvels Koļcovs (from Jūrmala)
—	MF	(Latvia) LVA	Aleksejs Kuplovs-Oginskis (from (England) Hyde)
—	MF	(Georgia (country)) GEO	Giorgi Tsakadze (from Daugava)

Out: Note: Flags indicate national team as defined under FIFA eligibility rules; some limited exceptions apply. Players may hold more than one non-FIFA nationality.

No.	Pos.	Nation	Player

=== Spartaks ===
In: Note: Flags indicate national team as defined under FIFA eligibility rules; some limited exceptions apply. Players may hold more than one non-FIFA nationality.

No.	Pos.	Nation	Player
1	GK	(Latvia) LVA	Artūrs Biezais (from Jūrmala-VV)
4	DF	(Colombia) COL	Ezequiel Palomeque Mena (from (Colombia) Gallegol S.A.S)
5	MF	(Latvia) LVA	Aleksandrs Gramovičs (from (Sweden) Östersund)
6	MF	(Colombia) COL	Carlos Andrès Rua Flores (from (Colombia) Gallegol S.A.S)
7	FW	(Colombia) COL	Daniel Buitrago (from (Colombia) Gallegol S.A.S)
13	MF	(Latvia) LVA	Vladimirs Nosiks (free agent)
16	DF	(Latvia) LVA	Nauris Bulvītis (from (Slovakia) Spartak Trnava)
18	MF	(Latvia) LVA	Deniss Tarasovs (on loan from Ventspils)
25	FW	(Latvia) LVA	Romāns Mickevičs (from Jūrmala-VV)
—	MF	(Latvia) LVA	Konstantīns Budilovs (from Jūrmala)
—	DF	(Latvia) LVA	Jevgēņijs Kačanovs (from Jūrmala)
—	FW	(Colombia) COL	Jairo Andrés Mosquera Mendoza (from (Paraguay) Guaraní)
—	GK	(Russia) RUS	Aleksandr Nevokshonov (from (Russia) SKA-Energiya Khabarovsk)
—	GK	(Latvia) LVA	Viesturs Zuika (free agent)
—	FW	(Colombia) COL	David Armero Cortés (from Jelgava)

Out: Note: Flags indicate national team as defined under FIFA eligibility rules; some limited exceptions apply. Players may hold more than one non-FIFA nationality.

No.	Pos.	Nation	Player
1	GK	(Latvia) LVA	Jevgēņijs Sazonovs (to (Cyprus) Ethnikos Achna)
—	FW	(Colombia) COL	David Armero Cortés (on loan to (Moldova) Sheriff Tiraspol)

=== Tukums 2000 ===
In: Note: Flags indicate national team as defined under FIFA eligibility rules; some limited exceptions apply. Players may hold more than one non-FIFA nationality.

No.	Pos.	Nation	Player
3	DF	(Latvia) LVA	Ojārs Ostrovskis (from reserves)
5	FW	(Latvia) LVA	Sergejs Cigankovs (from Ventspils-2)
11	MF	(Latvia) LVA	Daniels Vasiļjevs (from Ventspils-2)

Out: Note: Flags indicate national team as defined under FIFA eligibility rules; some limited exceptions apply. Players may hold more than one non-FIFA nationality.

No.	Pos.	Nation	Player
1	GK	(Latvia) LVA	Romans Maksimovs (to Ventspils-2)
11	FW	(Latvia) LVA	Edgars Omeļjaņenko (to Ventspils-2)
23	FW	(Latvia) LVA	Edijs Joksts (to Ventspils-2)

=== Jelgava-2 ===
In: Note: Flags indicate national team as defined under FIFA eligibility rules; some limited exceptions apply. Players may hold more than one non-FIFA nationality.

No.	Pos.	Nation	Player

Out: Note: Flags indicate national team as defined under FIFA eligibility rules; some limited exceptions apply. Players may hold more than one non-FIFA nationality.

No.	Pos.	Nation	Player

=== Varavīksne ===
In: Note: Flags indicate national team as defined under FIFA eligibility rules; some limited exceptions apply. Players may hold more than one non-FIFA nationality.

No.	Pos.	Nation	Player
1	GK	(Latvia) LVA	Raivo Varažinskis (on loan from Liepājas Metalurgs)
11	MF	(Latvia) LVA	Jevgēņijs Kazačoks (from Liepājas Metalurgs-2)
15	MF	(Latvia) LVA	Jans Bespjorstovs (on loan from Liepājas Metalurgs-2)
—	MF	(Latvia) LVA	Valentīns Doloka (on loan from Liepājas Metalurgs-2)
—		(Latvia) LVA	Roberts Dzērve (from Liepājas Metalurgs-2)
—	MF	(Latvia) LVA	Nils Sitenkovs (from Liepājas Metalurgs-2)

Out: Note: Flags indicate national team as defined under FIFA eligibility rules; some limited exceptions apply. Players may hold more than one non-FIFA nationality.

No.	Pos.	Nation	Player
1	GK	(Latvia) LVA	Deniss Korneičiks (to (Lithuania) Banga Gargždai)
9	FW	(Azerbaijan) AZE	Vugar Askherov (to Liepājas Metalurgs)
10	DF	(Latvia) LVA	Romāns Gladiļins (to (Estonia) Sillamäe Kalev)
—	?	(Latvia) LVA	Aivis Zorģis (to (Norway) Nesset)

=== Ogre/FK33 ===
In: Note: Flags indicate national team as defined under FIFA eligibility rules; some limited exceptions apply. Players may hold more than one non-FIFA nationality.

No.	Pos.	Nation	Player
10	?	(Latvia) LVA	Rūdolfs Siliņš (free agent)

Out: Note: Flags indicate national team as defined under FIFA eligibility rules; some limited exceptions apply. Players may hold more than one non-FIFA nationality.

No.	Pos.	Nation	Player
