= FK Jaunība =

FK Jaunība may be:

- FK Jaunība — defunct Latvian football club from Daugavpils.
- FK Jaunība — Latvian football club from Riga.
