= Vitali Kuznetsov =

Vitali Kuznetsov may refer to:

- Vitali Kuznetsov (judoka), Soviet wrestler, silver olympic medalist in judo
- Vitali Kuznetsov (footballer), Russian footballer
