= 康弘 =

康弘, meaning 'healthy, vast', may refer to:

- Chengdu Kanghong Pharmaceutical Group, a company in the province of Sichuan, China
- Yasuhiro, a masculine Japanese given name
