= Dmitri Kulikov =

Dmitri Kulikov may refer to:

- Dmitri Kulikov (footballer) (born 1977), Estonian footballer
- Dmitry Kulikov (ice hockey) (born 1990), Russian ice hockey defenceman
