= Yasuhiro =

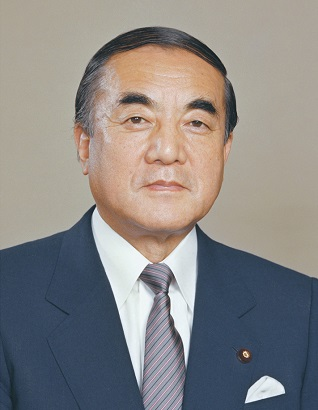
- Yasuhiro Nakasone (1918–2019), Japanese politician
- Pronunciation: jasɯçiɾo (IPA)
- Gender: Male

Origin
- Origin: Japanese
- Meaning: Different meanings depending on the kanji used

Yasuhiro is a masculine Japanese given name.

== Written forms ==
Yasuhiro can be written using many different combinations of kanji characters. Here are some examples:

- 康弘, "healthy, vast"
- 康広, "healthy, wide"
- 康寛, "healthy, generosity"
- 康裕, "healthy, abundant"
- 康浩, "healthy, vast"
- 康洋, "healthy, ocean"
- 康博, "healthy, doctor"
- 康尋, "healthy, look for"
- 靖弘, "peaceful, vast"
- 靖広, "peaceful, wide"
- 靖寛, "peaceful, generosity"
- 靖裕, "peaceful, abundant"
- 靖浩, "peaceful, vast"
- 靖洋, "peaceful, ocean"
- 靖博, "peaceful, doctor"
- 靖尋, "peaceful, look for"
- 安弘, "tranquil, vast"
- 安広, "tranquil, wide"
- 安寛, "tranquil, generosity"
- 保弘, "preserve, vast"
- 保洋, "preserve, ocean"
- 保博, "preserve, doctor"
- 泰洋, "peaceful, ocean"
- 泰弘, "peaceful, vast"
- 泰博, "peaceful, doctor"
- 易尋, "divination, look for"
- 易大, "divination, big"
- 恭大, "respectful, big"

The name can also be written in hiragana やすひろ or katakana ヤスヒロ.

== Notable people with the name ==
Arts

- Yasuhiro Abe (安部 恭弘, born 1956), musician
- Yasuhiro Fukushima (福嶋 康博, born 1947), founder of Enix
- Yasuhiro Imagawa (今川 泰宏, born 1961), anime director
- Yasuhiro Irie (入江 泰浩, born 1971), animator, character designer, and anime director
- Yasuhiro Ishimoto (石元 泰博, 1921–2012), Japanese-American photographer
- Yasuhiro Kanō (叶 恭弘, born 1970), manga artist
- Yasuhiro Kato (加藤 康弘; born 1986), Japanese footballer
- Yasuhiro Kobayashi (小林 靖宏, born 1959), musician
- Yasuhiro Morinaga (森永 泰弘, born 1980), Japanese composer and sound director
- Yasuhiro Nightow (内藤 泰弘, born 1967), manga artist and game designer
- Yasuhiro Sugihara (杉原 康弘, born 1969), better known as Sugizo, a musician
- Yasuhiro Takato (高戸 靖広, born 1968), voice actor
- Yasuhiro Takeda (武田 康廣, born 1957), anime director
- Yasuhiro Takemoto (武本 康弘, 1972–2019), anime director
- Yasuhiro Wada (和田 康宏), the creator of the Story of Seasons video game series
- Yasuhiro Yoshida (吉田 康弘; born 1969), Japanese footballer and manager
- Yasuhiro Yoshiura (吉浦 康裕, born 1980), anime writer and director

Football

- Yasuhiro Hato (波戸 康広, born 1976), footballer
- Yasuhiro Higuchi (樋口 靖洋, born 1961), Japanese football manager
- Yasuhiro Hiraoka (平岡 康裕, born 1986), footballer
- Yasuhiro Kato (加藤 康弘, born 1986), Japanese footballer
- Yasuhiro Nagahashi (長橋 康弘, born 1975), Japanese footballer
- Yasuhiro Nomoto (野本 安啓, born 1983), Japanese footballer
- Yasuhiro Okuyama (奥山 泰裕, born 1985), Japanese footballer
- Yasuhiro Yamada (山田 泰寛, 1968–2013), Japanese footballer
- Yasuhiro Yamakoshi (山腰 泰博, born 1985), Japanese footballer
- Yasuhiro Yamamura (山村 泰弘, born 1976), Japanese footballer
- Yasuhiro Yoshida (吉田 康弘, born 1969), footballer

Martial arts

- Yasuhiro Awano (粟野 靖浩, born 1988), Japanese judoka
- Yasuhiro Kido (城戸 康裕, born 1982), kickboxer and martial artist
- Yasuhiro Konishi (小西 康裕, 1893–1983), Japanese karate teacher
- Yasuhiro Urushitani (漆谷 康宏, born 1976), mixed martial artist
- Yasuhiro Yamashita (山下 泰裕, born 1957), judo competitor

Politics

- Yasuhiro Hanashi (葉梨 康弘, born 1959), politician
- Yasuhiro Matsuda (松田 康博, born 1965), Japanese professor of politics
- Yasuhiro Nakagawa (中川 泰宏, born 1951), politician
- Yasuhiro Nakasone (中曽根 康弘, 1918–2019), politician
- Yasuhiro Oe (大江 康弘, born 1945), politician
- Yasuhiro Ozato (小里 泰弘, born 1958), politician
- Yasuhiro Sonoda (園田 康博, born 1967), politician
- Yasuhiro Tsuji (辻 泰弘, born 1955), politician

Sports

- Yasuhiro Ando (安藤 康洋; born 1969), Japanese cyclist
- Yasuhiro Fueki (笛木 靖宏, born 1985), Japanese 400 metres runner
- Yasuhiro Funatogawa (船渡川 育宏, born 1955), Japanese professional golfer
- Yasuhiro Ikuta (生田 康宏; born 1979), Japanese alpine skier
- Yasuhiro Inaba (稲葉 泰弘, born 1985), Japanese freestyle wrestler
- Yasuhiro Kai (甲斐 康浩; born 1968), Japanese judoka
- Yasuhiro Kaido (魁道 康弘, born 1975), former sumo wrestler
- Yasuhiro Kojima (小島 泰弘, 1937–1999), former professional wrestler
- Yasuhiro Komazaki (駒崎 康弘; born 1953), Japanese swimmer
- Yasuhiro Nagahashi (長橋 康弘, born 1948), Japanese professional golfer
- Yasuhiro Noguchi (野口 泰弘, born 1946), former volleyball player
- Yasuhiro Okubo (大久保 康裕; born 1961), Japanese sport wrestler
- Yasuhiro Sato (佐藤 康弘, born 1967), baseball player
- Yasuhiro Shimizu (清水 康弘; born 1958), Japanese speed skater
- Yasuhiro Suzuki (鈴木 康弘, born 1984), Japanese Olympic boxer
- Yasuhiro Takai (高井 保弘; 1945–2019), Japanese baseball player
- Yasuhiro Tanaka (baseball) (田中 靖洋, born 1987), Japanese baseball player
- Yasuhiro Une (畝 康弘), former Paralympic wheelchair athlete
- Yasuhiro Wada (Honda) (和田 康裕, born 1951), manager of Honda Racing F1

=== Other ===
- Yasuhiro Masuda (増田 康宏, born 1997), Japanese shogi player

== Fictional characters ==
- Yasuhiro Hagakure (葉隠 康比呂), in Danganronpa: Trigger Happy Havoc
