= Iosif Solomonov =

Russian footballer

Personal information
- Full name: Iosif Viktorovich Solomonov
- Date of birth: 6 June 1986 (age 40)
- Height: 1.85 m (6 ft 1 in)
- Position: Defender

Senior career*
Years	Team	Apps	(Gls)
2007	FC Anzhi-Bekenez Makhachkala (amateur)		
2008	FC Mashuk-KMV Pyatigorsk	1	(0)
2008	FC Zenit Penza	4	(0)
2011	FC Dagdizel Kaspiysk	0	(0)
2011	FK Jūrmala-VV	5	(1)
- * Club domestic league appearances and goals

Iosif Viktorovich Solomonov (Russian: Иосиф Викторович Соломонов; born 6 June 1986) is a former Russian professional footballer.

== Club career ==
He made his Russian Football National League debut for FC Mashuk-KMV Pyatigorsk on 24 June 2008 in a game against FC Dynamo Bryansk. That was his only season in the FNL.
