= Oleh Patyak =

Ukrainian footballer

Personal information
- Full name: Oleh Stanislavovich Patyak
- Date of birth: 28 November 1985 (age 40)
- Place of birth: Zaporizhzhia, Ukrainian SSR
- Height: 1.80 m (5 ft 11 in)
- Position: Midfielder

Senior career*
| Years | Team | Apps | (Gls) |
| 2002–2008 | Metalurh Zaporizhzhia | 2 | (0) |
| 2002–2007 | → Metalurh-2 Zaporizhzhia | 57 | (6) |
| 2002–2003 | → Torpedo Zaporizhzhia (loan) | 22 | (0) |
| 2008 | → Spartak Nalchik (loan) | 2 | (0) |
| 2010 | Feniks-Illichovets Kalinine | 16 | (0) |
| 2013 | Slavutych Cherkasy | 10 | (0) |
| 2013–2016 | Vektor Bohatyrivka (amateur) | | |
- * Club domestic league appearances and goals

Oleh Stanislavovich Patyak (Russian: Олег Станиславович Патяк; born 28 November 1985) is a Ukrainian former footballer.
