= Nikola Karčev =

Macedonian footballer

Personal information
- Full name: Nikola "Mitko" Karčev; Никола Карчев
- Date of birth: 31 March 1981 (age 45)
- Place of birth: Skopje, SFR Yugoslavia
- Height: 1.85 m (6 ft 1 in)
- Position: Defender

Team information
- Current team: Borec (manager)

Youth career
- Partizan

Senior career*
Years	Team	Apps	(Gls)
2000–2001	Borec	12	(1)
2001–2003	Pelister	39	(1)
2003–2007	Rabotnički	112	(16)
2007	Elbasani	29	(4)
2008	Terek Grozny	1	(0)
2008–2010	Elbasani	13	(0)
2009–2010	→ Vardar (loan)	11	(1)
2010–2011	Shanghai East Asia	37	(0)
2011–2012	Metalac G.M.	6	(0)
2012–2013	Yangon United	7	(0)
2013	Teteks	3	(0)

International career
2002	Macedonia U21	4	(0)
2005–2010	Macedonia	3	(0)

Managerial career
- 2020: TuS Bövinghausen (assistant)
- 2021: Kadino
- 2022: Pakhtakor Tashkent (assistant)
- 2023–: Borec
- * Club domestic league appearances and goals

Nikola "Mitko" Karčev (Macedonian: Никола "Митко" Карчев, born 31 March 1981) is a Macedonian football coach and a former international defender. He is the manager of Borec.

== Club career ==
Karčev started his career on the youth team of FK Partizan in Serbia before moving back to Macedonia to play with FK Borec, FK Pelister and FK Rabotnički. He went to Albanian team KF Elbasani for the 2007–08 season and was elected the best player of the team.

In 2010, Karčev moved to Shanghai East Asia, becoming an integral member of the team's backfield.

In the summer of 2011 he returned to Serbia, signing with SuperLiga side FK Metalac G.M.

== International career ==
He made his debut for the Macedonian national team in 2005 in a tournament played in Iran, where he played in both matches played by the team. His third and final international was a December 2010 friendly match against China.
