= Dumitru Dolgov =

Moldovan footballer

Personal information
- Full name: Dmitri Dolgov
- Date of birth: 24 August 1987 (age 39)
- Place of birth: Perevalsk, Ukrainian SSR
- Height: 1.87 m (6 ft 2 in)
- Position: Defender

Youth career
- FC Stal Alchevsk

Senior career*
Years	Team	Apps	(Gls)
2003–2005	FC Stal-2 Alchevsk		
2005–2007	FC Nistru Otaci	53	(3)
2008	FC Terek Grozny	7	(0)
2011	FC Sfintul Gheorghe	31	(2)
2011	FC Costuleni	10	(0)
2013	FC Veris Chișinău	1	(0)
2013–2014	FC Dinamo-Auto Tiraspol	25	(1)
2015	FC Spartak Gelendzhik		
2015	FC Anapa (amateur)		
2016	FC Kubanskaya Korona Shevchenko		
2017–2019	FC Spartak Gelendzhik		

International career
2007–2008	Moldova U-21	5	(0)
- * Club domestic league appearances and goals

Dumitru Dolgov (Russian: Дмитрий Владимирович Долгов; born 24 August 1987) is a Moldovan former footballer.

== Career ==
Dolgov began his career with Ukrainian club FC Stal Alchevsk and came in 2006 to Moldova and signed for FC Nistru Otaci.

He was offered a contract from FC Terek Grozny in early 2008 and joined the Russian Premier League club. Dumitru played only 7 matches during the 2008 season because of an injury. In January 2011 he returned to Moldova and signed for FC Sfîntul Gheorghe. After a half year with FC Sfîntul Gheorghe in August 2011 he joined league rival FC Costuleni.

== International career ==
In 2006 he became the Moldova citizen and played for the Moldova national under-21 team.
