= Dmitri Kulikov (footballer) =

Estonian footballer

Personal information
- Date of birth: 23 September 1977 (age 49)
- Place of birth: Tallinn, then part of Estonian SSR, Soviet Union
- Height: 1.75 m (5 ft 9 in)
- Positions: Defender; midfielder

Youth career
- 1989–1994: FC Puuma Tallinn

Senior career*
Years	Team	Apps	(Gls)
1996	FC Arsenal Tallinn	12	(2)
1996	FC Norma Tallinn	8	(0)
1996–1999	FC Lantana	50	(5)
1999	FC Kuressaare	18	(6)
2000–2003	FC Levadia Tallinn	81	(14)
2004–2007	FC Kuressaare	111	(33)
2008–2010	FK Jauniba		
2011–2012	FC Levadia Tallinn	20	(10)
2013–2014	JK Retro	24	(9)

International career^{‡}
2003	Estonia	1	(0)
2003	Saaremaa	5	(2)
- * Club domestic league appearances and goals as of 19 December 2007 ‡ National team caps and goals as of 19 December 2007

Dmitri Kulikov (born 23 September 1977) is an Estonian football referee and a former footballer, who played as defender and midfielder for Estonian Meistriliiga club FC Kuressaare and Latvian Virsliga club FK Jaunība Rīga.
