= Radoslav Zabavník =

Slovak footballer (born 1980)

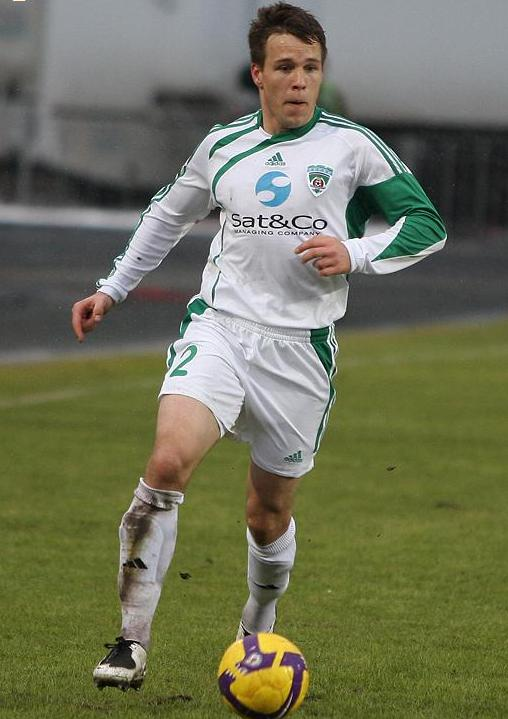
- Zabavník playing for Terek Grozny in 2009

Personal information
- Date of birth: 16 September 1980 (age 46)
- Place of birth: Košice, Czechoslovakia
- Height: 1.83 m (6 ft 0 in)
- Position: Full-back

Youth career
- 1988–1998: Košice

Senior career*
Years	Team	Apps	(Gls)
1998–2002	Košice	68	(9)
2002–2004	Žilina	65	(9)
2004–2005	CSKA Sofia	41	(7)
2005–2007	Sparta Prague	41	(1)
2008–2009	Terek Grozny	51	(1)
2010–2013	Mainz 05	63	(0)
2011	Mainz 05 II	1	(0)
2013–2014	SV Sandhausen	0	(0)
Total		330	(27)

International career
2003–2012	Slovakia	58	(1)
- * Club domestic league appearances and goals

Radoslav Zabavník (born 16 September 1980) is a Slovak former professional footballer who played as a full-back.

== Club career ==
Zabavník played for MFK Košice and Žilina in his native country's Corgoň Liga, winning the championship twice with MŠK Žilina. Between 2004 and late 2005, Zabavník played in Bulgaria for CSKA Sofia. He became the first Slovak player to sign a contract with an A PFG club. In the end of 2005, he was sold to Sparta Prague. In February 2008, Sparta Prague sold Zabavník to Terek Grozny. In December 2009, he was released and signed for Mainz 05 on 1 February 2010.

== International career ==
Zabavník became the oldest ever Slovak international debutant since 2003, having played the first game for his country in the 2006 FIFA World Cup qualifier match against Luxembourg at the age of 24 years.

== Career statistics ==
=== Club ===
Appearances and goals by club, season and competition
Club	Season	League		
Club	Season	Division	Apps	Goals
1. FC Košice	1998–99	Slovak Superliga	1	0
1. FC Košice	1999–2000	Slovak Superliga	6	0
1. FC Košice	2000–01	Slovak Superliga	32	3
1. FC Košice	2001–02	Slovak Superliga	29	6
1. FC Košice	Total		68	9
MŠK Žilina	2002–03	Slovak Superliga	32	4
MŠK Žilina	2003–04	Slovak Superliga	33	5
MŠK Žilina	Total		65	9
CSKA Sofia	2004–05	Bulgarian A Professional Football Group	29	6
CSKA Sofia	2005–06	Bulgarian A Professional Football Group	12	1
CSKA Sofia	Total		41	7
Sparta Prague	2005–06	Gambrinus liga	14	1
Sparta Prague	2006–07	Gambrinus liga	23	0
Sparta Prague	2007–08	Gambrinus liga	4	0
Sparta Prague	Total		41	1
Terek Grozny	2008	Russian Premier League	25	1
Terek Grozny	2009	Russian Premier League	26	0
Terek Grozny	Total		51	1
Mainz 05	2009–10	Bundesliga	12	0
Mainz 05	2010–11	Bundesliga	20	0
Mainz 05	2011–12	Bundesliga	14	0
Mainz 05	2012–13	Bundesliga	17	0
Mainz 05	Total		63	0
Mainz 05 II	2011–12	Regionalliga West	1	0
Career total			330	27

=== International ===
Scores and results list Slovakia's goal tally first, score column indicates score after Zabavník goal.

International goal scored by Radoslav Zabavník
No.	Date	Venue	Opponent	Score	Result	Competition
1	8 September 2004	Tehelné Pole, Bratislava, Slovakia	Liechtenstein	7–0	7–0	2006 FIFA World Cup qualification

== Honours ==
- Slovak Super Liga Team of the Season: 2002–03
