= Vladimir Kuzmichyov =

Russian footballer

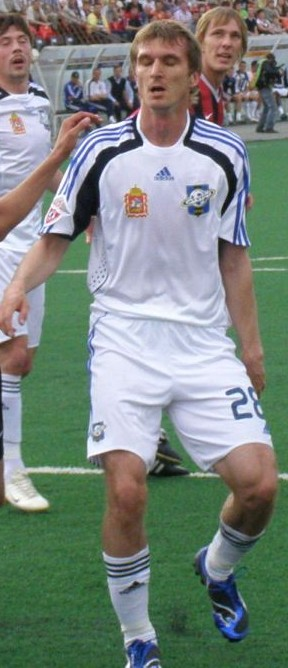

Personal information
- Full name: Vladimir Vladimirovich Kuzmichyov
- Date of birth: 28 July 1979
- Place of birth: Moscow, Soviet Union
- Date of death: 24 September 2016 (aged 37)
- Place of death: Moscow, Russia
- Height: 1.85 m (6 ft 1 in)
- Positions: Midfielder; striker

Youth career
- Spartak Moscow

Senior career*
Years	Team	Apps	(Gls)
1996–1997	Spartak-d Moscow	35	(9)
1998–1999	Spartak-2 Moscow	54	(7)
2000	Chernomorets Novorossiysk	22	(4)
2000	Chernomorets-2 Novorossiysk	3	(1)
2000–2001	Dynamo Kyiv	11	(2)
2000–2001	→ Dynamo-2 Kyiv	12	(2)
2001–2005	CSKA Moscow	14	(0)
2002–2003	→ Torpedo Moscow (loan)	16	(1)
2003–2005	→ Spartak Nalchik (loan)	73	(7)
2005	→ Anzhi Makhachkala (loan)	18	(4)
2006–2007	Kuban Krasnodar	41	(7)
2008	Terek Grozny	24	(5)
2009–2010	Saturn Moscow Oblast	39	(5)
2011–2012	Dynamo Bryansk	26	(2)
2012–2013	Khimki	10	(1)
2013	Sokol Saratov	3	(3)
2014	Vityaz Podolsk	5	(0)
Total		406	(60)

International career
2000–2001	Russia U-21	7	(0)
- * Club domestic league appearances and goals

Vladimir Vladimirovich Kuzmichyov (Russian: Владимир Владимирович Кузьмичёв; 28 July 1979 – 24 September 2016) was a Russian footballer.

He was a pupil of FC Spartak Moscow. In his rookie season he played for Chernomorets Novorossiysk.

On 24 September 2016 he died in a traffic accident.
