= Sergei Serdyukov =

Russian footballer

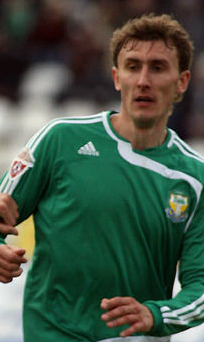

Personal information
- Full name: Sergei Sergeyevich Serdyukov
- Date of birth: 10 April 1981 (age 45)
- Place of birth: Lermontov, Russian SFSR
- Height: 1.92 m (6 ft 3 1/2 in)
- Position: Forward

Youth career
- –1997: FC Dynamo Stavropol

Senior career*
| Years | Team | Apps | (Gls) |
| 1998 | FC Dynamo Stavropol | 0 | (0) |
| 1999 | FC Beshtau Lermontov | 0 | (0) |
| 2000–2001 | FC Dynamo Stavropol | 47 | (1) |
| 2001 | FC Spartak-Kavkaztransgaz Izobilny | 14 | (1) |
| 2002 | FC Kavkazkabel Prokhladny | 26 | (4) |
| 2003–2005 | FC Dynamo Makhachkala | 121 | (27) |
| 2006 | FC Spartak Nalchik | 29 | (3) |
| 2007 | FC Tom Tomsk | 25 | (1) |
| 2008–2009 | FC Terek Grozny | 26 | (0) |
| 2009 | → FC Anzhi Makhachkala (loan) | 6 | (2) |
| 2009 | FC Nosta Novotroitsk | 11 | (1) |
| 2010–2012 | FC KAMAZ Naberezhnye Chelny | 82 | (16) |
| 2012–2013 | FC Gazovik Orenburg | 24 | (8) |
| 2013–2014 | FC Tyumen | 26 | (6) |
| 2014–2015 | FC Dynamo GTS Stavropol | 30 | (11) |
| 2015–2018 | FC Dynamo Stavropol | 76 | (18) |
- * Club domestic league appearances and goals

Sergei Sergeyevich Serdyukov (Russian: Серге́й Серге́евич Сердюков; born 10 April 1981) is a former Russian professional football player.

== Club career ==
He made his Russian Premier League debut for PFC Spartak Nalchik on 18 March 2006 in a game against PFC CSKA Moscow. He played 3 seasons in the Premier League for Spartak Nalchik, FC Tom Tomsk and FC Terek Grozny.
