= Goran Dimovski =

Macedonian footballer

Personal information
- Date of birth: 14 October 1982 (age 44)
- Place of birth: Veles, SFR Yugoslavia
- Height: 1.74 m (5 ft 9 in)
- Position: Defender

Senior career*
Years	Team	Apps	(Gls)
2002–2004	Rabotnički	26	(1)
2005–2007	Makedonija	81	(6)
2008	Terek Grozny	1	(0)
2008–2010	Rabotnički	67	(0)
2011–2012	Dacia Chişinău	54	(1)
2013	Bregalnica	12	(0)
2016–2017	Borec		
- * Club domestic league appearances and goals

Goran Dimovski (born 14 October 1982) is a Macedonian former footballer.
