= Serge Tatiefang =

Cameroonian footballer

Tati
Personal information
- Full name: Serge Tatiefang
- Date of birth: 25 August 1987 (age 39)
- Place of birth: Akom II, Cameroon
- Height: 1.80 m (5 ft 11 in)
- Positions: Defensive midfielder; defender

Team information
- Current team: Skonto FC
- Number: 20

Youth career
- 2005: Canon Yaoundé

Senior career*
Years	Team	Apps	(Gls)
2006–2007	→ FC Daugava (loan)		
2007–2008	FC SKA-Energiya Khabarovsk	0	(0)
2008–2010	Estudiantes Tecos	13	(2)
2010	FK Ventspils	16	(2)
2011–2015	FK Banga Gargždai		
2015–	Skonto FC		

International career^{‡}
–2008	Cameroon U23		
- * Club domestic league appearances and goals as of 21 April 2008 ‡ National team caps and goals as of 20 May 2009

Serge Tatiefang (also known as El Tati), (born 25 August 1987) is a Cameroonian defensive midfielder, He currently plays for Skonto FC in Virsliga.

== Career ==
He has played in international leagues like Russian First Division, Primera División de México{{}} and Latvian Higher League.

Tatiefang signed with Mexican club Estudiantes Tecos following a spell with FC SKA-Energiya Khabarovsk. He played for the club in the 2008 promotion playoffs.
