= Kwara Football Academy =

Kwara Football Academy (KFA), an initiative within North Central Nigeria by the Kwara State Government . It was opened by the President of the Confederation of African Football (CAF) Issa Hayatou in 2005. The Academy's focus is on skill development. It is open to all regardless of place of origin. The Academy currently has top coaches who are all former international football players with coaching certificates.

== Objectives ==
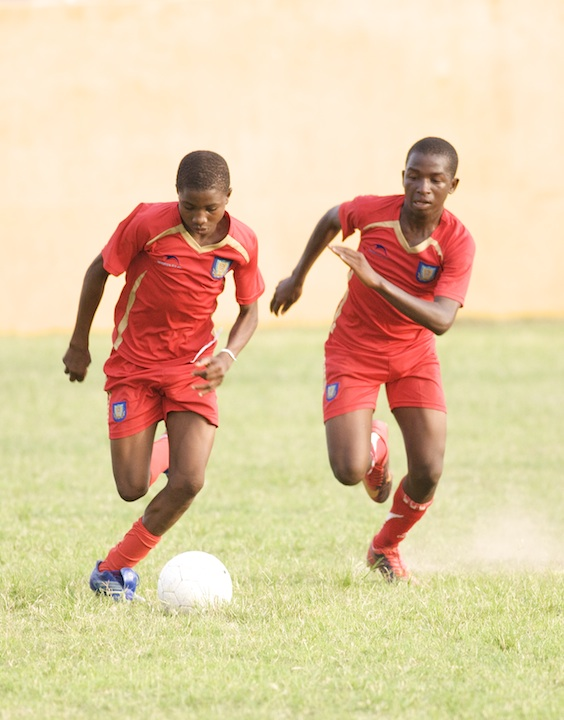
Students at play

The Kwara Football Academy was a private initiative established with support from the state government as a center for youth development, using football as a medium of empowerment. The Academy provides a structured environment aimed at keeping youths away from drugs, violence and other unhealthy activities.

With 350 students, KFA trains footballers between the ages of 9 and 21 years to compete at international levels. It also focuses on developing players' skills so that graduates may pursue careers as professional footballers with international clubs.

The academy describes itself as the first of its kind in Nigeria, providing opportunities for potential footballers to receive formal education alongside football training.

== Overview ==
KFA offers talented youths the opportunity to acquire a formal education at no cost while training as professional footballers. The Academy provides a full on-campus boarding arrangement to support student concentration and engagement. The curriculum is based on the Nigerian educational system and incorporates aspects of the British curriculum, enabling students to sit examinations including the West African School Certificate Examinations (WASCE), National Examination Certificate (NECO), International General Certificate of Secondary Education (IGCSE), Test of English as a Foreign Language (TOEFL) and the International Baccalaureate (IB).

Areas of study include English and other Modern European Languages, General and Applied Mathematics, Humanities and Social Sciences, Creative, Technical and Vocational Studies, and Natural Sciences.

Students are grouped into three categories: the junior cadre (ages 13–14), the intermediate cadre (ages 15–16), and the elite cadre (ages 17–19).

The junior and intermediate groups combine academics with football training, while the elite group combines football with management courses.

== The Facility ==
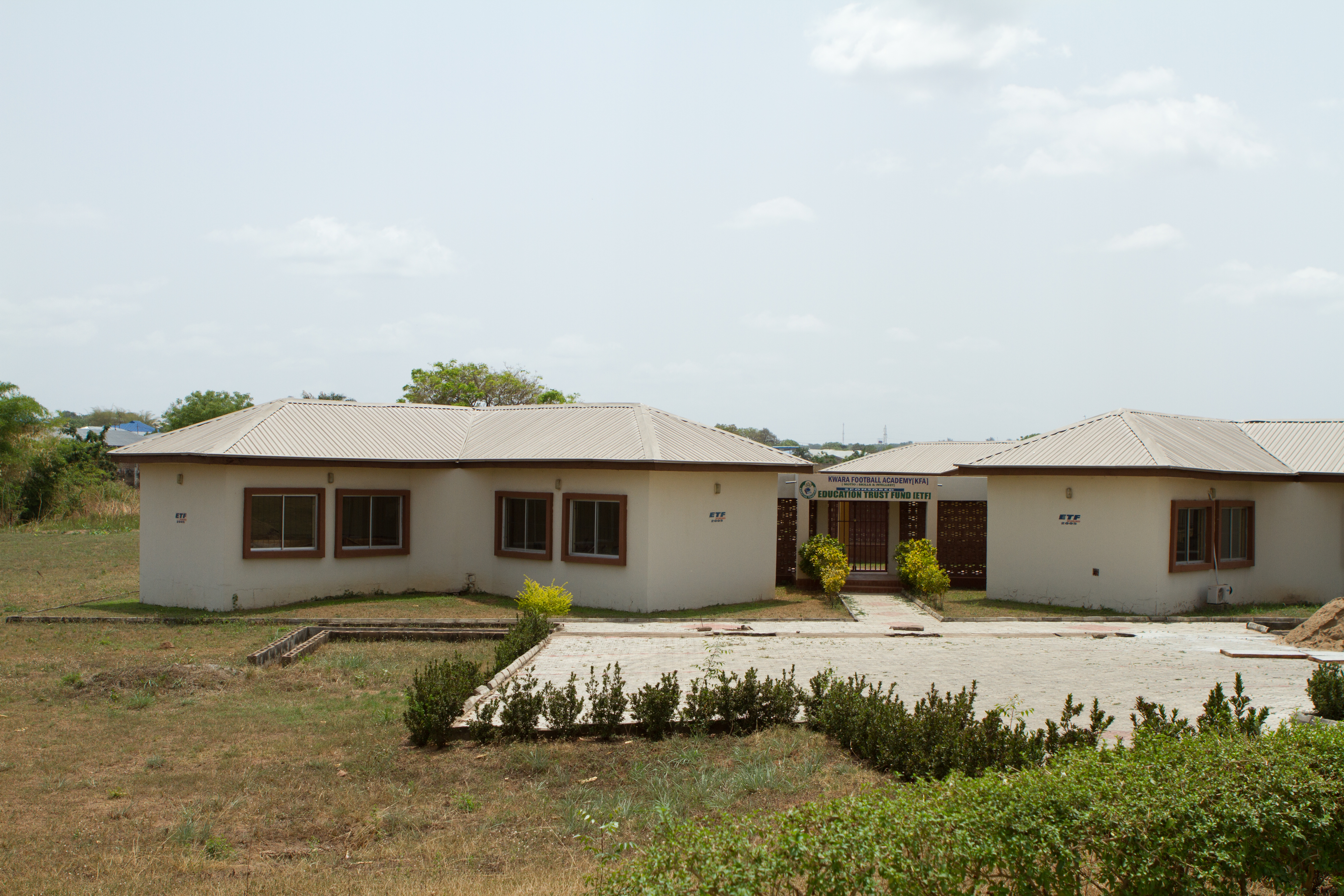
Cross section of administrative buildings at KFA

The academy is located on approximately 35 hectares of land within the Kwara State Stadium Complex in Ilorin. The facilities have a capacity to accommodate 200 students and include four football pitches with sprinkler systems, one tennis court, one basketball court, one gymnasium, three blocks of student hostels (27 rooms each), and a medical centre.

== Achievements ==
Players from KFA have participated in trials with several international clubs. In 2009, two players were invited for trials with Chelsea Football Club and two others for trials at Portsmouth Football Club, both in England. A number of academy graduates have gone on to play for clubs within and outside Nigeria, including Emmanuel Dennis (Nottingham Forest, England). In 2013, Raymond Japhet represented Nigeria at the FIFA U-17 World Cup.
