= Pāvels Koļcovs =

Latvian footballer (born 1982)

Personal information
- Full name: Pāvels Koļcovs
- Date of birth: 1 September 1982 (age 44)
- Place of birth: Daugavpils, Latvian SSR, Soviet Union (now Republic of Latvia)
- Height: 1.73 m (5 ft 8 in)
- Position: Defender

Senior career*
Years	Team	Apps	(Gls)
2000–2002	Dinaburg Daugavpils	58	(8)
2003	Metallurg-Kuzbass	3	(0)
2003–2010	Dinaburg Daugavpils	182	(3)
2010	FC Daugava	1	(0)
2010–2011	FK Jaunība	14	(0)
2011	FC Jūrmala	5	(0)
2011–2012	BFC Daugava	?	(?)
2012–2013	Ilūkstes NSS	21	(2)
2013	BFC Daugava	18	(2)
- * Club domestic league appearances and goals as of 5 April 2013 ‡ National team caps and goals as of 26 July 2011

Pāvels Koļcovs (born 1 September 1982) is a Latvian football defender, currently playing for BFC Daugava in the Latvian First League.

He previously played for Dinaburg FC but after the club's relegation from Virsliga, he became an unrestricted free agent and joined FC Daugava.

In July 2010, he left Daugava, signing for FK Jaunība from Riga, after the season he was released. In April 2011, he joined Virsliga newcomers FC Jūrmala, but was released in July and joined BFC Daugava. Before the start of the 2012 season, Koļcovs moved to the Latvian First League newcomers Ilūkstes NSS. He played 21 matches for them, scoring 2 goals, helping his team clinch a promotion to the Latvian Higher League. He left the team after the 2012 season to join the Latvian First League club BFC Daugava.

Koļcovs had a brief spell with FC Metallurg-Kuzbass Novokuznetsk in the Russian First Division during the 2003 season.

== Playing career ==
2000	Dinaburg FC Daugavpils	Virsliga 1st level
2001	Dinaburg FC Daugavpils	Virsliga 1st level
2002	Dinaburg FC Daugavpils	Virsliga 1st level
2003	FC Metallurg-Kuzbass Novokuznetsk	Russian First Division 2nd level	3/0
2003	Dinaburg FC Daugavpils	Virsliga 1st level
2004	Dinaburg FC Daugavpils	Virsliga 1st level	25/2
2005	Dinaburg FC Daugavpils	LMT Virslīga 1st level	19/0
2006	Dinaburg FC Daugavpils	LMT Virslīga 1st level	18/1
2007	Dinaburg FC Daugavpils	LMT Virslīga 1st level

* – played games and goals
