= Anatoli Romanovich =

Russian footballer

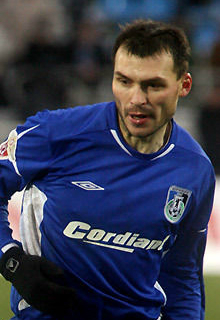
- Anatoli Romanovich

Personal information
- Full name: Anatoli Vladimirovich Romanovich
- Date of birth: 9 September 1979 (age 47)
- Place of birth: Salihorsk, Byelorussian SSR, Soviet Union
- Height: 1.86 m (6 ft 1 in)
- Position: Defender

Senior career*
Years	Team	Apps	(Gls)
1999–2000	FC Oazis Yartsevo	66	(1)
2001–2004	FC Dynamo Makhachkala	137	(5)
2005	PFC Spartak Nalchik	35	(2)
2006–2007	FC Shinnik Yaroslavl	23	(0)
2007–2008	FC Terek Grozny	29	(2)
2009	FC MVD Rossii Moscow	7	(0)
2009–2010	FC Krasnodar	18	(0)
2010–2011	FC Baltika Kaliningrad	45	(0)
2012–2013	FC SKA-Energiya Khabarovsk	24	(2)
2013–2014	FC Luch-Energiya Vladivostok	30	(2)
2014	FC TSK Simferopol	15	(0)
2015	FC Domodedovo Moscow	18	(0)
- * Club domestic league appearances and goals

Anatoli Vladimirovich Romanovich (Russian: Анатолий Владимирович Романович; born 9 September 1979) is a former Russian footballer.
