= Lionnel Franck =

Cameroonian footballer

Personal information
- Full name: Lionnel Franck Djimgou Tchoumbou
- Date of birth: March 27, 1989 (age 37)
- Place of birth: Douala, Cameroon
- Height: 1.79 m (5 ft 10 in)
- Position: Striker

Youth career
- 1999–2001: Valencia
- 2001–2007: Real Madrid

Senior career*
Years	Team	Apps	(Gls)
2007–2008	Real Madrid C	10	(3)
2008–2010	Xerez	3	(1)
2008–2009	→ San Fernando (loan)	12	(4)
2009–2010	Xerez B	14	(2)
2010–2011	FC Daugava	5	(0)
Total		44	(10)
- * Club domestic league appearances and goals

Lionnel Franck Djimgou Tchoumbou (born 27 March 1989) is a Cameroonian former footballer who last played for FC Daugava as a forward.

After joining Real Madrid's youth team, Franck left to play for other teams in Spain and Latvia, before retiring due to injury.

== Club career ==
Franck was born in Douala, Cameroon, and arrived in Paiporta when he was 11 years old. He joined the youth team of Valencia, E-1 Valencia. Whilst there, he was scouted by Real Madrid, and played for a youth side that featured Juan Mata, Claudio Giráldez and Pedro Mosquera. He spent seven years with Madrid's youth team. Franck was considered one of Real Madrid's most promising players during his time at the club.

After leaving Real Madrid C, he joined Xerez, and took part in preseason with the club. However, he was told by his coach, Esteban Vigo, that he needed to spend time on loan, and so joined San Fernando on loan. His time with San Fernando was blighted by financial issues; however, he said he learnt "a lot." After leaving Xerez, he went abroad and joined Latvian club FC Daugava; however, by the time he had returned to Valencia, he had torn a knee muscle and quit football.

After retiring from football, Franck worked in other jobs, including youth coaching with the Atlético Ciudad Paiporta's U12s. He was part of one of the Valencia towns hardest hit by the 2024 Spanish floods, and together with his former Real Madrid teammates, helped participate in the cleanup by either donating items or food.

== Personal life ==
Franck has a wife and family. He holds a Spanish passport.
