= Vitali Kuznetsov (footballer) =

Russian footballer

Vitali Vyacheslavovich Kuznetsov
Personal information
- Full name: Vitali Vyacheslavovich Kuznetsov
- Date of birth: 21 February 1986 (age 40)
- Height: 1.98 m (6 ft 6 in)
- Position: Midfielder

Youth career
- FC Zenit St. Petersburg

Senior career*
Years	Team	Apps	(Gls)
2006	Warkauden Jalkapalloklubi	12	(1)
2007	FC Favorit Vyborg		
2008	FC Baltika Kaliningrad	0	(0)
2008	FC Terek Grozny	4	(0)
2009	FC Favorit Vyborg		
- * Club domestic league appearances and goals

Vitali Vyacheslavovich Kuznetsov (Russian: Виталий Вячеславович Кузнецов) (born 21 February 1986) is a former Russian footballer.
