= Artsyom Vaskow =

Belarusian footballer

Personal information
- Date of birth: 21 October 1988 (age 38)
- Place of birth: Gomel, Belarusian SSR
- Height: 1.65 m (5 ft 5 in)
- Position: Midfielder

Team information
- Current team: Pogoń Lębork
- Number: 16

Youth career
- 2004–2005: Gomel
- 2006–2007: Dinamo Minsk

Senior career*
Years	Team	Apps	(Gls)
2007–2011	Blāzma Rēzekne	36	(5)
2009	→ Neman Grodno (loan)	1	(0)
2009	→ Olimpik-Shuvalan Baku (loan)	12	(0)
2010	→ DSK Gomel (loan)	10	(1)
2011	→ Vitebsk (loan)	21	(1)
2012–2015	Torpedo-BelAZ Zhodino	98	(14)
2016	Neman Grodno	23	(1)
2017	Ventspils	16	(0)
2018	Smolevichi	23	(4)
2019	Gorodeya	17	(0)
2020–2021	Gomel	53	(19)
2022	Arsenal Dzerzhinsk	14	(1)
2022–2023	Lublinianka	3	(3)
2023–2025	Stilon Gorzów Wielkopolski	55	(6)
2025–	Pogoń Lębork	15	(4)
- * Club domestic league appearances and goals as of 21:29, 20 June 2025 (UTC)

Artsyom Vaskow (Belarusian: Арцём Васькоў; Russian: Артём Васьков; born 21 October 1988) is a Belarusian professional footballer who plays as a midfielder for Polish IV liga Pomerania club Pogoń Lębork.

== Honours ==
Torpedo-BelAZ Zhodino

- Belarusian Cup: 2015–16

Ventspils

- Latvian Football Cup: 2016–17

Gomel

- Belarusian Cup: 2021–22
