= Yasuhiro Kato =

Japanese footballer

Personal information
- Date of birth: 13 May 1986 (age 40)
- Place of birth: Gamagōri, Aichi, Japan
- Height: 1.75 m (5 ft 9 in)
- Position: Midfielder

Youth career
- 2005–2008: University of Hamamatsu

Senior career*
Years	Team	Apps	(Gls)
2009	Nagano Parceiro	9	(6)
2010	Osotspa Saraburi	6	(0)
2010	Royal Thai Army	11	(1)
2011	Gulbene	12	(3)
2011	Ventspils	5	(0)
2011	Ventspils-2	4	(1)
2012	Hoverla-Zakarpattia Uzhhorod	4	(0)
2013–2015	Stomil Olsztyn	23	(2)
2016	Drava Ptuj	8	(0)
2016	Motor Lublin	4	(1)
Total		86	(14)
- * Club domestic league appearances and goals

Yasuhiro Kato (加藤 康弘, Katō Yasuhiro; born 13 May 1986) is a Japanese former professional footballer who played as a midfielder.

Kato previously played for Nagano Parceiro in the Japan Football League and Osotspa Saraburi F.C. and the Royal Thai Army in the Thai Premier League. In March 2011 he signed a contract with the Latvian Higher League club FB Gulbene. On 7 July 2011, he joined to FK Ventspils. In February 2012 he signed a contract with the Ukrainian club Hoverla-Zakarpattia Uzhhorod for two years.

In summer 2015 he joined Slovenian Second League side NŠ Drava Ptuj.

== Honours ==
Ventspils

- Latvian Higher League: 2011
- Latvian Football Cup: 2010–11

Hoverla Uzhhorod

- Ukrainian First League: 2011–12
