= Ihor Dudnyk =

Ukrainian footballer

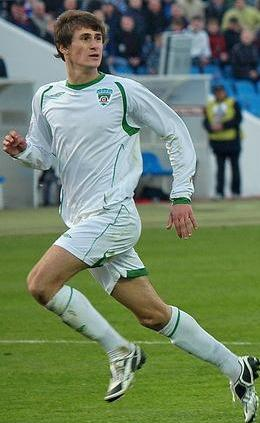

Personal information
- Full name: Ihor Anatoliiovych Dudnyk
- Date of birth: 9 August 1985 (age 41)
- Place of birth: Kuibysheve, Yakymivka Raion, Zaporizhzhia Oblast, Ukrainian SSR (now Viazivka, Melitopol Raion, Zaporizhzhia Oblast, Ukraine)
- Height: 1.76 m (5 ft 9 in)
- Position: Defender

Youth career
- 1999: Torpedo Zaporizhzhia

Senior career*
Years	Team	Apps	(Gls)
2002–2007	Metalurh Zaporizhzhia	4	(0)
2002–2007	→ Metalurh-2 Zaporizhzhia	42	(1)
2008	Terek Grozny	4	(0)
2009	Zakarpattia Uzhhorod	0	(0)
2009–2010	Krasnodar	1	(0)
2010	Daugava	3	(0)
2010	Feniks-Illichovets Kalinine	8	(2)
2011	Daugava	11	(4)
2011–2012	Metalurh Zaporizhzhia	15	(0)
2012	→ Metalurh-2 Zaporizhzhia	2	(0)
2013–2014	Olimpik Donetsk	27	(1)
2014	Tavria-Skif Rozdol		
2015	Yalta		
- * Club domestic league appearances and goals

Ihor Anatoliiovych Dudnyk (Ukrainian: Ігор Анатолійович Дудник; born 9 August 1985) is a retired Ukrainian professional football defender.

== Career ==
On 11 February 2009, Luch-Energia Vladivostok signed him from Terek Grozny, he moved with Russian central defender and teammate Anatoli Romanovich. In April 2010 he was signed by the Latvian side FC Daugava but left the team in August the same year, joining FC Feniks-Illichovets Kalinine. In April 2011 he came back to Latvia, signing with FC Daugava once again. In June, he signed for FC Metalurh Zaporizhzhia.
