= Guntars Silagailis =

Latvian footballer

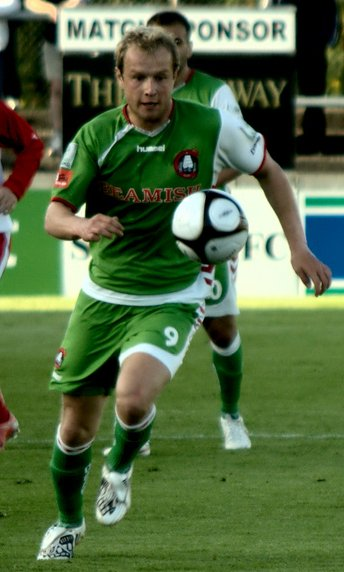
- Silagailis in action for Cork City

Personal information
- Full name: Guntars Silagailis
- Date of birth: 31 August 1984 (age 42)
- Place of birth: Rēzekne, Latvian SSR, Soviet Union
- Height: 1.80 m (5 ft 11 in)
- Position: Forward

Team information
- Current team: Rēzeknes BJSS (manager)

Senior career*
Years	Team	Apps	(Gls)
2001–2008	Blāzma	141	(142)
2006	→ Ventspils (loan)	1	(0)
2008	FK Rīga	15	(2)
2009	Cork City	29	(4)
2010	Vitebsk	18	(0)
2010	Blāzma	10	(5)
2011	Ahva Arraba	16	(3)
2011	Jūrmala	8	(0)
2012–2013	Daugava Daugavpils	43	(2)
2014–2019	Rēzeknes BJSS	124	(106)

Managerial career
- 2020–: Rēzeknes BJSS
- * Club domestic league appearances and goals as of 31 December 2020

Guntars Silagailis (born 31 August 1984) is a Latvian professional football coach and former player, currently managing Rēzeknes BJSS in the Latvian First League. He played as a striker.

== Career ==
=== Early career ===
In the early part of his career he played for numerous clubs in Latvia including his hometown club FK Rezekne and top Latvian side FK Ventspils. Following a short period with FK Riga Silagailis was on his way out of the country.

=== Cork City ===
Silagailis signed for Cork City in February 2009 and had an immediate impact on the team. He scored away against Derry on 20 March 2009 however the Rebel Army ended up losing 2–1. He scored a brace the week after in a 2–1 victory over Bray Wanderers at Turner's Cross.

However his stay in Ireland and was blighted by injury and he failed to make a sustained impression at the club and was out of the first team for large periods of the season. His only other goal for the club in the FAI Cup in June away to Sligo Rovers but City were knocked out 2–1. He left the club after his season-long contract was not renewed.

=== Belarus ===
After his brief spell in Western Europe he went to the other side of the continent and joined FC Vitebsk from Belarus in February 2010. He played only a few matches there and didn't manage to score a single goal. After only 6 months with the club he decided to break his contract with the club as its financial situation was getting worse. Since August 2010 Silagailis had a free agent's status and was looking for a new club.

=== Return to Latvia ===
Only a week after he had been released from the Belarus side, he found a new club. This time he returned to the club, where he had started his playing career - SK Blāzma. He finished the season with 5 goals in 10 appearances.

=== Israel ===
In January 2011 he left SK Blāzma, signing for Liga Leumit club Ahva Arraba. He scored 3 goals in 16 games for the Israeli club and left on 1 August 2011.

=== Welcome home again ===
In August 2011 Silagailis signed a contract with the Latvian Higher League newcomers FC Jūrmala. He played 8 league matches for them, without scoring goals. Before the 2012 Latvian Higher League season Silagailis went on trial with last year's bronze medalists Daugava Daugavpils and signed a contract with them in March 2012. He spent two seasons with Daugava being in times played as a forward and a left-back. With 2 goals in 43 league appearances and UEFA Champions League experience under his belt Silagailis left Daugava in March 2014 to join his home-town club Rēzeknes BJSS playing in the Latvian First League. With 41 goals scored in a single season Silagailis became the top scorer of the 2014 Latvian First League season and helped his club finish the championship as the runners-up.

== Honours ==
- Latvian Higher League champion - 2006, 2012
- Latvian Supercup winner - 2013
- Latvian First League top scorer - 2014
