= FK Jaunība Rīga =

Latvian football club

- Full name: Futbola Klubs Jaunība Rīga
- Founded: 2006
- Ground: Daugava Stadium, Riga, Latvia
- Capacity: 5,683
- Chairman: Sergejs Davidovs
- Manager: Sergejs Davidovs
- League: 2. līga
- 2019: 7th
Home colours	Away colours

FK Jaunība was a Latvian football club located in Riga. The club last played in 2. līga – the third tier of Latvian football. Previously they played in Virsliga (the first tier of Latvian football), but after finishing the 2018–19 season in 7th place in the 2.liga and playing their last recorded match against SK Super Nova–2 on the 25th of September 2019, they were never heard from again.

On their website, they were last referred to as a club "Under Reconstruction."

== League and Cup history ==
Season	Division (Name)	Pos./Teams	Pl.	W	D	L	GS	GA	P	Latvian Football Cup
2007	2nd (1.līga)	6/(16)	30	16	3	11	71	51	51	1/8 finals
2008	2nd (1.līga)	3/(15)	28	19	3	6	68	28	60	Did not participate
2009	2nd (1.līga)	2/(14)	26	18	6	2	59	24	60	Did not participate
2010	1st (Virsliga)	10/(10)	27	4	4	19	16	80	16	1/8 finals
2019	3rd (2. līga)	7/(11)	18	6	5	7	33	38	23	Did not participate

== Current squad ==
As of September 25, 2019 Note: Flags indicate national team as defined under FIFA eligibility rules; some limited exceptions apply. Players may hold more than one non-FIFA nationality.

No.	Pos.	Nation	Player
6	MF	EST	Dmitri Kulikov (captain)
12	GK	LVA	Jurijs Nadeždins
13	DF	LVA	Jānis Skribis
14	FW	LVA	Mihails Cigankovs
18	FW	LVA	Iļja Solomatins
20	MF	LVA	Andrejs Gusevs
21	MF	LVA	Jurijs Krasņakovs
--	FW	LVA	Armands Prutāns

For recent squad changes, see: List of Latvian football transfers summer 2019.
