= 2015–16 FC Terek Grozny season =

FC Terek Grozny
2015–16 season
- Chairman: Ramzan Kadyrov
- Manager: Rashid Rakhimov
- Stadium: Akhmat-Arena
- Russian Premier League: 7th
- Russian Cup: Quarter-final
- Top goalscorer: League: Maciej Rybus (9); All: Maciej Rybus (9)
Home colours	Away colours

The 2015–16 FC Terek Grozny season was the seventh successive season that the club played in the Russian Premier League, the highest tier of association football in Russia, and 7th in total. Terek Grozny also took part in the Russian Cup.

== Squad ==
As of match played 21 May 2016

No.	Name	Nationality	Position	Date of birth (age)	Signed from	Signed in	Contract ends	Apps.	Goals
Goalkeepers
1	Yaroslav Hodzyur	(Ukraine)	GK	6 March 1985 (aged 31)	Dynamo-2 Kyiv	2008		103	0
16	Yevgeni Gorodov	(Russia)	GK	13 December 1985 (aged 30)	Krasnodar	2013		39	0
33	Vitali Gudiyev	(Russia)	GK	22 April 1995 (aged 21)	Alania Vladikavkaz	2014		0	0
Defenders
2	Rodolfo	(Brazil)	DF	23 October 1982 (aged 33)	Vasco da Gama	2015		33	0
3	Tedore Grigalashvili	(Georgia (country))	DF	12 May 1993 (aged 23)	Samtredia	2015		1	0
4	Juhani Ojala	(Finland)	DF	19 June 1989 (aged 26)	Young Boys	2013	2016	26	0
5	Zaurbek Pliyev	(Russia)	DF	27 September 1991 (aged 24)	Kairat	2016		10	0
11	Milad Mohammadi	(Iran)	DF	29 September 1993 (aged 22)	Rah Ahan	2016		3	0
15	Andrei Semyonov	(Russia)	DF	24 March 1989 (aged 27)	Amkar Perm	2013		75	2
24	Marcin Komorowski	(Poland)	DF	17 April 1984 (aged 32)	Legia Warsaw	2012	2016	83	7
29	Luke Wilkshire	(Australia)	DF	2 October 1981 (aged 34)		2015	2016	7	0
40	Rizvan Utsiyev	(Russia)	DF	7 February 1988 (aged 28)	Trainee	2005			
Midfielders
6	Adílson	(Brazil)	MF	16 January 1987 (aged 29)	Grêmio	2011		104	3
8	Pedro Ken	(Brazil)	MF	20 March 1987 (aged 29)	Cruzeiro	2016		5	0
14	Ismaïl Aissati	(Morocco)	MF	16 August 1988 (aged 27)	Antalyaspor	2013		69	2
19	Oleg Ivanov	(Russia)	MF	4 August 1986 (aged 29)	Rostov	2012		129	9
20	Kanu	(Brazil)	MF	23 September 1987 (aged 28)	Anderlecht	2013		60	3
21	Daler Kuzyayev	(Russia)	MF	15 January 1993 (aged 23)	Neftekhimik Nizhnekamsk	2014		46	0
22	Reziuan Mirzov	(Russia)	MF	22 June 1993 (aged 22)	Torpedo Moscow	2015		5	0
23	Facundo Píriz	(Uruguay)	MF	27 March 1990 (aged 26)	Nacional	2013	2017	48	2
30	Gheorghe Grozav	(Romania)	MF	10 September 1992 (aged 23)	Petrolul Ploiești	2013		31	3
31	Maciej Rybus	(Poland)	MF	19 August 1989 (aged 26)	Legia Warsaw	2012		109	19
55	Igor Lebedenko	(Russia)	MF	27 May 1983 (aged 32)	Rubin Kazan	2012		129	17
Forwards
7	Khalid Kadyrov	(Russia)	FW	19 April 1994 (aged 22)	Trainee	2010		12	1
9	Zaur Sadayev	(Russia)	FW	6 November 1989 (aged 26)	Trainee	2006			
17	Ablaye Mbengue	(Senegal)	FW	19 May 1992 (aged 24)	Sapins	2015		27	7
93	Apti Akhyadov	(Russia)	FW	24 August 1993 (aged 22)	Trainee	2011		2	0
95	Magomed Mitrishev	(Russia)	FW	10 September 1992 (aged 23)	Spartak Nalchik	2012		46	8
Out on Loan
	Adlan Katsayev	(Russia)	MF	20 February 1988 (aged 28)	Trainee	2005			
Left During the Season
8	Maurício	(Brazil)	MF	21 October 1988 (aged 27)	Fluminense	2010		172	29
13	Fyodor Kudryashov	(Russia)	DF	5 April 1987 (aged 29)	Spartak Moscow	2012		76	0

=== Out on loan ===
Note: Flags indicate national team as defined under FIFA eligibility rules; some limited exceptions apply. Players may hold more than one non-FIFA nationality.

No.	Pos.	Nation	Player
10	MF	RUS	Adlan Katsayev (at SKA-Energiya Khabarovsk)

== Transfers ==
=== Summer ===
In: Note: Flags indicate national team as defined under FIFA eligibility rules; some limited exceptions apply. Players may hold more than one non-FIFA nationality.

No.	Pos.	Nation	Player
9	FW	RUS	Zaur Sadayev (end of loan to (Poland) Lech Poznań)
22	MF	RUS	Reziuan Mirzov (from (Russia) Torpedo Moscow)
30	MF	ROU	Gheorghe Grozav (end of loan to (Romania) Dinamo București)
34	FW	RUS	Taimaz Khizriyev
37	GK	RUS	Turpal-Ali Debirov (from (Russia) Gums Gudermes)
39	FW	RUS	Ali Khusainov
41	FW	RUS	Khalim Yunusov
52	MF	RUS	Abdurakhman Akhilgov
53	DF	RUS	Ali Bamatgeriyev
63	MF	RUS	Chingiz Magomadov
79	DF	RUS	Zubayr Madayev
82	FW	RUS	Viskhazh Israilov (from (Russia) Terek-2 Grozny)
85	MF	RUS	Sharapudin Shalbuzov (from (Russia) Terek-2 Grozny)
92	DF	RUS	Kerim Magamayev
95	FW	RUS	Magomed Mitrishev (end of loan to (Russia) Anzhi Makhachkala)
97	GK	RUS	Rasul Umayev
98	MF	RUS	Adam Abdurakhmanov

Out: Note: Flags indicate national team as defined under FIFA eligibility rules; some limited exceptions apply. Players may hold more than one non-FIFA nationality.

No.	Pos.	Nation	Player
12	GK	RUS	Mokhmad-Emi Gazaliyev
39	MF	RUS	Muslim Ismailov
41	DF	RUS	Islam Yakhyayev
52	MF	RUS	Ismail Matayev
53	DF	RUS	Magomed Barzukayev
56	FW	RUS	Islam Magamadov
57	MF	RUS	Deni Daliyev
58	FW	RUS	Arsen Vagidov
63	DF	RUS	Alikhan Abukhazhiyev
65	FW	RUS	Arbi Musluyev
67	DF	RUS	Arbi Salikhov
68	MF	RUS	Adlan Muzhedov
71	MF	RUS	Daud Daliyev
74	MF	RUS	Arbi Davletgereyev
79	FW	RUS	Umar Asakov
85	MF	RUS	Ali Idrisov
89	MF	RUS	Muslim Batayev
91	GK	RUS	Magomed Dokuyev
94	MF	RUS	Salakh Barzukayev
—	GK	RUS	Yevgeni Kobozev (to (Russia) Tosno, previously on loan to (Russia) Krylia Sovetov Samara)
—	DF	RUS	Murad Tagilov (released, previously on loan to (Russia) Khimik Dzerzhinsk)
—	DF	RUS	Dmitri Yashin (on loan to (Russia) Baikal Irkutsk, previously on loan to (Russia) Oryol)

=== In ===
Date	Position	Nationality	Name	From	Fee	Ref.
12 July 2015	DF	(Georgia (country))	Tedore Grigalashvili	Samtredia	Undisclosed	
18 November 2015†	DF	(Australia)	Luke Wilkshire		Free	
7 December 2015	DF	(Russia)	Zaurbek Pliyev	Kairat	Undisclosed	
3 February 2016	MF	(Brazil)	Pedro Ken	Cruzeiro	Undisclosed	
6 February 2016	DF	(Iran)	Milad Mohammadi	Rah Ahan Yazdan	Undisclosed	

† Wilkshire's move was announced on the above date, becoming official on 1 January 2016 when the transfer window opened.

=== Out ===
Date	Position	Nationality	Name	To	Fee	Ref.
2 July 2015	FW	(Democratic Republic of the Congo)	Jeremy Bokila	Guangzhou R&F	Undisclosed	
9 July 2015	FW	(Brazil)	Aílton	Al-Hilal	Undisclosed	
15 January 2016	DF	(Russia)	Fyodor Kudryashov	Rostov	Undisclosed	
17 January 2016	MF	(Brazil)	Maurício	Zenit St.Petersburg	Undisclosed	

=== Loans out ===
Date from	Position	Nationality	Name	To	Date to	Ref.
29 July 2015	DF	(Finland)	Juhani Ojala	HJK	31 December 2015	
1 January 2016	MF	(Russia)	Adlan Katsayev	SKA-Energiya Khabarovsk	End of Season	

=== Released ===
Date	Position	Nationality	Name	Joined	Date
31 May 2016	DF	(Finland)	Juhani Ojala	SJK	1 September 2016
31 May 2016	MF	(Brazil)	Kanu	Buriram United	1 July 2016
31 May 2016	MF	(Morocco)	Ismaïl Aissati	Alanyaspor	29 July 2016
	DF	(Russia)	Magomed Adayev	Angusht Nazran	
	DF	(Russia)	Ali Bamatgeriyev		
	DF	(Russia)	Sheykh-Magomed Tagirov		
	MF	(Russia)	Ibragim Titayev		
	MF	(Russia)	Aslan Tokhosashvili		
	MF	(Russia)	Rakhman Momuyev		
	FW	(Russia)	Viskhazh Israilov		

=== Trial ===
Date From	Date To	Position	Nationality	Name	Last club	Ref.
January 2016		MF	(Netherlands)	Lerin Duarte	AFC Ajax	

== Friendlies ==
22 June 2015	Terek Grozny (Russia)	1 – 0	(North Macedonia) Vardar	Bad Erlach, Austria
18:00 MSK (UTC+3)	Mitrishev 33'	Summary		Attendance: 120

25 June 2015	Terek Grozny (Russia)	0 – 0	(Slovakia) Spartak Trnava	Bad Erlach, Austria
19:00 MSK (UTC+3)		Summary		Attendance: 100

28 June 2015	Terek Grozny (Russia)	7 – 0	(Hungary) Haladás	Bad Tatzmannsdorf, Austria
18:00 MSK (UTC+3)		Summary

4 July 2015	Terek Grozny (Russia)	0 – 1	(Serbia) Partizan	Bad Erlach, Austria
19:00 MSK (UTC+3)		Summary

7 July 2015	Terek Grozny (Russia)	1 – 3	(Austria) Admira Wacker	Bad Erlach, Austria
19:00 MSK (UTC+3)		Summary

12 July 2015	Terek Grozny (Russia)	0 – 0	(Slovakia) FC ViOn	Bad Erlach, Austria
19:00 MSK (UTC+3)		Summary

20 January 2016	Terek Grozny (Russia)	3 – 0	(United States) PSC Elite	Malta
17:30 MSK (UTC+3)	Grozav 61'; Mitrishev 87'; Duarte 90'	Summary	Muslimovich 90'

23 January 2016	Terek Grozny (Russia)	4 – 1	(Slovenia) Zavrč	Malta
17:30 MSK (UTC+3)	Kanu 4'; Kadyrov 16'; Semyonov 62'; Grozav 64'	Summary	Muslimovich 90'

26 January 2016	Hibernians (Malta)	0 – 2	(Russia) Terek Grozny	Malta
20:00 MSK (UTC+3)		Summary	Lebedenko 78', 83'

31 January 2016	Stabæk (Norway)	0 – 2	(Russia) Terek Grozny	Malta
22:00 MSK (UTC+3)		Summary	Ivanov 15'; Mbengue 74'

6 February 2016	Viktoria Plzeň (Czech Republic)	0 – 3	(Russia) Terek Grozny	Malta
19:30 MSK (UTC+3)		Summary	Mitrishev 39'; Aissati 59'; Grozav 70'

9 February 2016	Mosta (Malta)	–	(Russia) Terek Grozny	Malta
20:00 MSK (UTC+3)		Summary

== Competitions ==
=== Russian Premier League ===
==== Results by round ====
Round	1	2	3	4	5	6	7	8	9	10	11	12	13	14	15	16	17	18	19	20	21	22	23	24	25	26	27	28	29	30
Ground	H	H	A	H	A	H	A	A	H	A	H	A	H	A	H	A	H	A	H	A	H	H	A	H	A	H	A	H	A	H
Result	D	D	L	D	D	D	D	W	W	D	W	W	D	L	W	D	W	D	W	W	D	W	L	L	W	L	L	W	L	L
Position	9	10	14	12	10	12	12	10	10	10	7	5	6	8	7	7	7	7	6	6	6	5	6	6	6	7	7	7	7	7

Updated to match(es) played on 2 June 2016. Source: Russian Premier League
A = Away; H = Home; W = Win; D = Draw; L = Loss

==== Matches ====
18 July 2015 1	Rostov	1 – 1	Terek Grozny	Rostov-on-Don
21:00 MSK (UTC+3)	Kalachev (yellow card) 33'; Doumbia 38'	Summary	Lebedenko (yellow card) 31' (goal) 70'; Rodolfo (yellow card) 33'; Píriz (yellow card) 40'; Kuzyayev (yellow card) 63'; Rybus (yellow card) 74'; Maurício (yellow card) 86'	Stadium: Olimp-2; Attendance: 10,534; Referee: Sergey Karasev

25 July 2015 2	Terek Grozny	1 – 1	Kuban Krasnodar	Grozny
21:00 MSK (UTC+3)	Píriz 32'; Adílson (yellow card) 43'; Sadayev (yellow card) 61'	Summary	Rabiu (yellow card) 8' (yellow-red card) 66'; Melgarejo 52' (yellow card) 55'; Ignatyev (yellow card) 80'	Stadium: Akhmat-Arena; Attendance: 12,734; Referee: Igor Fedotov

1 August 2015 3	Zenit St.Petersburg	3 – 0	Terek Grozny	Saint Petersburg
17:00 MSK (UTC+3)	Neto (yellow card) 4'; Smolnikov 7'; Shatov 11'; Danny 90'	Summary	Rodolfo (yellow card) 37'	Stadium: Petrovsky Stadium; Attendance: 17,835; Referee: Sergey Ivanov

7 August 2015 4	Terek Grozny	0 – 0	Mordovia Saransk	Grozny
19:00 MSK (UTC+3)	Ivanov (yellow card) 90'	Summary	Le Tallec (yellow card) 15'	Stadium: Akhmat-Arena; Attendance: 12,470; Referee: Aleksei Matyunin

16 August 2015 5	Lokomotiv Moscow	0 – 0	Terek Grozny	Moscow
13:30 MSK (UTC+3)	Logashov (yellow card) 3'; Ćorluka (yellow card) 83'; N'Dinga (yellow card) 89'	Summary	Maurício (yellow card) 26'; Adílson (yellow card) 31'; Semyonov (yellow card) 75'	Stadium: Lokomotiv Stadium; Attendance: 8,104; Referee: Vladislav Bezborodov

21 August 2015 6	Terek Grozny	1 – 1	Dynamo Moscow	Grozny
20:00 MSK (UTC+3)	Adílson (yellow card) 68'; Maurício 69' (yellow card) 85'; Utsiyev (yellow card) 90+3'	Summary	Kokorin 41' (red card) 48'	Stadium: Akhmat-Arena; Attendance: 17,740; Referee: Igor Nizovtsev

28 August 2015 7	Ural	3 – 3	Terek Grozny	Yekaterinburg
17:00 MSK (UTC+3)	Manucharyan 8'; Fontanello 16'; Yerokhin 88'	Summary	Rybus 22'; Sadayev 39'; Aissati 66'; Utsiyev (yellow card) 71'; Mbengue (yellow card) 74'	Stadium: SKB-Bank Arena; Attendance: 4,700; Referee: Vitaly Meshkov

13 September 2015 8	Anzhi Makhachkala	0 – 2	Terek Grozny	Kaspiysk
19:00 MSK (UTC+3)	Lazić (yellow card) 15'; Haruna (yellow card) 20'	Summary	Lazić 59' (o.g.); Lebedenko 62'; Gorodov (yellow card) 70'	Stadium: Anzhi Arena; Attendance: 15,050; Referee: Igor Fedotov

19 September 2015 9	Terek Grozny	4 – 1	Ufa	Grozny
16:00 MSK (UTC+3)	Maurício 10' (pen.), 36'; Ivanov (yellow card) 47'; Kudryashov (yellow card) 48'; Sadayev (yellow card) 56' (goal) 79'; Rybus 81'	Summary	Pourié (yellow card) 6'; Paurević (yellow card) 10'; Igboun 69' (pen.); Diego (yellow card) 82'	Stadium: Akhmat-Arena; Attendance: 13,740; Referee: Aleksei Matyunin

27 September 2015 10	Krasnodar	1 – 1	Terek Grozny	Krasnodar
16:30 MSK (UTC+3)	Petrov 72'; Wánderson (yellow card) 80'	Summary	Kudryashov (yellow card) 37'; Semyonov (yellow card) 53'; Sadayev 56' (yellow card) 90+2'	Stadium: Kuban Stadium; Attendance: 8,150; Referee: Aleksey Eskov

4 October 2015 11	Terek Grozny	2 – 1	Rubin Kazan	Grozny
16:00 MSK (UTC+3)	Sadayev 18', 23' (yellow card) 36'; Semyonov (yellow card) 39'; Kuzyayev (yellow card) 78'; Maurício (yellow card) 88'	Summary	Kuzmin (yellow card) 14'; Ozdoyev 51'; Cotugno (yellow card) 81'	Stadium: Akhmat-Arena; Attendance: 14,245; Referee: Vitaly Meshkov

18 October 2015 12	Krylia Sovetov	0 – 2	Terek Grozny	Samara
16:00 MSK (UTC+3)		Summary	Utsiyev (yellow card) 49'; Adílson 88'; Mitrishev 90+7'	Stadium: Metallurg Stadium; Attendance: 10,800; Referee: Sergey Kulikov

25 October 2015 13	Terek Grozny	0 – 0	CSKA Moscow	Grozny
19:00 MSK (UTC+3)	Semyonov (yellow card) 32'	Summary	Dzagoev (yellow card) 30'; Eremenko (yellow card) 67'; Wernbloom (yellow card) 72'; Musa (yellow card) 90'	Stadium: Akhmat-Arena; Attendance: 17,820; Referee: Sergei Lanochkin

2 November 2015 14	Amkar Perm	1 – 0	Terek Grozny	Perm
17:00 MSK (UTC+3)	Zanev (yellow card) 16'; Utsiyev 51' (o.g.); Dzhikiya (yellow card) 82'	Summary	Rodolfo (yellow card) 2'; Ivanov (yellow card) 43'	Stadium: Zvezda Stadium; Referee: Aleksey Eskov

7 November 2015 15	Terek Grozny	2 – 1	Spartak Moscow	Grozny
19:30 MSK (UTC+3)	Adílson 21'; Semyonov (yellow card) 38'; Rodolfo (yellow card) 53'; Mbengue 80'	Summary	Semyonov 6' (o.g.); Parshivlyuk (yellow card) 63'; Tasci (yellow card) 66'	Stadium: Akhmat-Arena; Attendance: 19,700; Referee: Kirill Levnikov

22 November 2015 16	Kuban Krasnodar	2 – 2	Terek Grozny	Krasnodar
17:00 MSK (UTC+3)	Baldé 6', 30'; Armaș (yellow card) 43'; Bucur (yellow card) 90+2'	Summary	Lebedenko (yellow card) 13' (yellow-red card) 40'; Semyonov (yellow card) 27'; Utsiyev 67'; Rybus 76'	Stadium: Kuban Stadium; Attendance: 5,517; Referee: Alexey Nikolaev

28 November 2015 17	Terek Grozny	4 – 1	Zenit St.Petersburg	Grozny
17:30 MSK (UTC+3)	Mitrishev 32', 55' (yellow card) 73'; Gorodov (yellow card) 41'; Rybus 42', 87'; Kudryashov (yellow card) 69'; Ivanov (yellow card) 84'; Maurício (yellow card) 90+2'	Summary	Hulk 54' (yellow card) 90+1'; Yevseyev (red card) 72'; García (yellow card) 80'	Stadium: Akhmat-Arena; Attendance: 19,780; Referee: Sergey Ivanov

3 December 2015 18	Mordovia Saransk	0 – 0	Terek Grozny	Saransk
19:00 MSK (UTC+3)	Phibel (yellow card) 11'; Lutsenko (yellow card) 68'; Shitov (yellow card) 69'	Summary	Rodolfo (yellow card) 68'; Grozav (yellow card) 71'; Kuzyayev (yellow card) 90+3'	Stadium: Start Stadium; Attendance: 4,272; Referee: Vitaly Meshkov

6 March 2016 19	Terek Grozny	2 – 1	Lokomotiv Moscow	Grozny
17:00 MSK (UTC+3)	Rybus 8' (pen.), 33'; Wilkshire (yellow card) 89'	Summary	Samedov 4'; Pejčinović (yellow card) 66'; Barinov (yellow card) 84'	Stadium: Akhmat-Arena; Attendance: 15,780; Referee: Aleksandr Egorov

14 March 2016 20	Dynamo Moscow	0 – 1	Terek Grozny	Khimki
19:00 MSK (UTC+3)	Hubočan (yellow card) 80'	Summary	Mitrishev 68' (yellow card) 80'; Ivanov (yellow card) 83'	Stadium: Arena Khimki; Attendance: 3,367; Referee: Sergey Lapochkin

19 March 2016 21	Terek Grozny	1 – 1	Ural	Grozny
17:00 MSK (UTC+3)	Ivanov 33'; Rodolfo (yellow card) 90'; Adílson (yellow card) 90'	Summary	Dorozhkin 19'; Kulakov (yellow card) 40'; Yaroshenko (yellow card) 73'; Novikov (yellow card) 75'; Fontanello (yellow card) 90'	Stadium: Akhmat-Arena; Attendance: 17,532; Referee: Sergey Ivanov

2 April 2016 22	Terek Grozny	3 – 2	Anzhi Makhachkala	Grozny
14:30 MSK (UTC+3)	Grozav 11', 26' (yellow card) 57'; Mitrishev (yellow card) 31'; Ivanov (yellow card) 77'; Mbengue 87'	Summary	Lazić (yellow card) 1' (goal) 7'; Boli 44'; Berisha (yellow card) 77'; Musalov (yellow card) 90+3'	Stadium: Akhmat-Arena; Attendance: 19,732; Referee: Aleksey Eskov

10 April 2016 23	Ufa	1 – 0	Terek Grozny	Ufa
14:30 MSK (UTC+3)	Safronidi 36'; Igboun (yellow card) 52'; Zinchenko (yellow card) 69'; Diego (yellow card) 82'	Summary	Ivanov (yellow card) 41'; Wilkshire (yellow card) 50'; Semyonov (yellow card) 56'; Píriz (yellow card) 67'	Stadium: Neftyanik Stadium; Attendance: 6,900; Referee: Vladislav Bezborodov

16 April 2016 24	Terek Grozny	0 – 1	Krasnodar	Grozny
14:30 MSK (UTC+3)		Summary	Smolov 44'; Ahmedov (yellow card) 90'	Stadium: Akhmat-Arena; Attendance: 17,350; Referee: Aleksandr Egorov

23 April 2016 25	Rubin Kazan	0 – 1	Terek Grozny	Kazan
19:30 MSK (UTC+3)		Summary	Pliyev (yellow card) 15'; Rybus 35'; Kuzyayev (yellow card) 74'; Adílson (yellow card) 82'	Stadium: Central Stadium; Attendance: 9,167; Referee: Aleksei Matyunin

1 May 2016 26	Terek Grozny	0 – 1	Krylia Sovetov	Grozny
17:00 MSK (UTC+3)	Utsiyev (yellow card) 41'; Rodolfo (yellow card) 67'	Summary	Pomerko (yellow card) 49'; Jahović 64' (yellow card) 64'; Rodić (yellow card) 68'	Stadium: Akhmat-Arena; Attendance: 12,700; Referee: Vitaly Meshkov

7 May 2016 27	CSKA Moscow	1 – 0	Terek Grozny	Khimki
14:30 MSK (UTC+3)	Wernbloom 18'	Summary	Rodolfo (yellow card) 13'; Wilkshire (yellow card) 53' (yellow-red card) 80'	Stadium: Arena Khimki; Attendance: 7,500; Referee: Vladimir Moskalyov

12 May 2016 28	Terek Grozny	2 – 0	Amkar Perm	Grozny
19:00 MSK (UTC+3)	Rybus 14'; Mbengue 34' (yellow card) 83'; Ivanov (yellow card) 44'; Grozav (yellow card) 90+4'	Summary	Zaytsev (yellow card) 66'; Balanovich (yellow card) 68'	Stadium: Akhmat-Arena; Attendance: 15,735; Referee: Alexey Nikolaev

16 May 2016 29	Spartak Moscow	3 – 0	Terek Grozny	Moscow
19:30 MSK (UTC+3)	Bocchetti 33' (yellow card) 85'; Melgarejo (yellow card) 51' (goal) 60'; Promes 63'; Kutin (yellow card) 89'; Glushakov (yellow card) 90+1'	Summary	Grozav (yellow card) 45+1'; Rybus (yellow card) 59'; Kuzyayev (yellow card) 73'; Adílson (yellow card) 90+1'	Stadium: Otkrytiye Arena; Attendance: 23,185; Referee: Aleksandr Egorov

21 May 2016 30	Terek Grozny	0 – 2	Rostov	Grozny
13:30 MSK (UTC+3)		Summary	Noboa 30'; Yerokhin 50'; Gațcan (yellow card) 88'; Novoseltsev (yellow card) 90'	Stadium: Akhmat-Arena; Attendance: 16,700; Referee: Aleksei Nikolaev

==== League table ====
Pos	Team	Pld	W	D	L	GF	GA	GD	Pts	Qualification or relegation
5	Spartak Moscow	30	15	5	10	48	39	+9	50	Qualification for the Europa League third qualifying round
6	Lokomotiv Moscow	30	14	8	8	43	33	+10	50	
7	Terek Grozny	30	11	11	8	35	30	+5	44	
8	Ural Sverdlovsk Oblast	30	10	9	11	39	46	−7	39	
9	Krylia Sovetov Samara	30	9	8	13	19	31	−12	35	

Source: Russian Premier League, Soccerway
Rules for classification: 1) Points; 2) Matches won; 3) Head-to-head points; 4) Head-to-head matches won; 5) Head-to-head goal difference; 6) Head-to-head goals scored; 7) Head-to-head away goals; 8) Goal difference; 9) Goals scored; 10) Away goals scored.

=== Russian Cup ===
23 September 2015 Round of 32	Nosta Novotroitsk	0–2	Terek Grozny	Novotroitsk
16:00 MSK (UTC+3)	Olifirenko (yellow card) 21'; Sabirzyanov (yellow card) 81'	Summary	Kadyrov 63'; Kanu 82'	Stadium: Metallurg Stadium; Attendance: 4,000; Referee: Yury Aponasenko

28 October 2015 Round of 16	Terek Grozny	2–1 (a.e.t.)	Khimki	Grozny
19:00 MSK (UTC+3)	Mitrishev 29', 98'	Summary	Dvornikov 69'; Zaika (yellow card) 85'; Markosov (yellow card) 89'; Gashchenkov (yellow card) 114'	Stadium: Akhmat-Arena; Attendance: 14,700; Referee: Evgeny Turbin

1 March 2016 Quarter-final	Krasnodar	1–0 (a.e.t.)	Terek Grozny	Kuban Stadium
19:15 MSK (UTC+3)	Smolov (yellow card) 74'; Granqvist (yellow card) 82' (goal) 116'; Ari (yellow card) 83'	Summary	Wilkshire (yellow card) 49'; Ivanov (yellow card) 57'; Rodolfo (yellow card) 86'	Stadium: Krasnodar; Attendance: 8,750; Referee: Kirill Levnikov

== Squad statistics ==
As of Match played 21 May 2016

=== Appearances and goals ===
No.	Pos	Nat	Player	Total		Premier League		Russian Cup	
No.	Pos	Nat	Player	Apps	Goals	Apps	Goals	Apps	Goals
1	GK	(Ukraine) UKR	Yaroslav Hodzyur	9	0	8+1	0	0	0
2	DF	(Brazil) BRA	Rodolfo	27	0	25+1	0	1	0
3	DF	(Georgia (country)) GEO	Tedore Grigalashvili	1	0	0	0	1	0
5	DF	(Russia) RUS	Zaurbek Pliyev	10	0	7+2	0	1	0
6	MF	(Brazil) BRA	Adílson	27	2	24+2	2	1	0
7	FW	(Russia) RUS	Khalid Kadyrov	5	1	1+3	0	1	1
8	MF	(Brazil) BRA	Pedro Ken	5	0	3+2	0	0	0
9	FW	(Russia) RUS	Zaur Sadayev	16	5	8+7	5	0+1	0
13	MF	(Iran) IRI	Milad Mohammadi	3	0	1+2	0	0	0
14	MF	(Morocco) MAR	Ismail Aissati	31	1	27+1	1	1+2	0
15	DF	(Russia) RUS	Andrei Semyonov	32	0	29	0	3	0
16	GK	(Russia) RUS	Yevgeni Gorodov	25	0	22	0	3	0
17	FW	(Senegal) SEN	Ablaye Mbengue	22	3	6+15	3	0+1	0
19	MF	(Russia) RUS	Oleg Ivanov	30	1	28	1	1+1	0
20	MF	(Brazil) BRA	Kanu	7	1	0+5	0	2	1
21	MF	(Russia) RUS	Daler Kuzyayev	24	0	17+4	0	3	0
22	MF	(Russia) RUS	Reziuan Mirzov	5	0	1+4	0	0	0
23	MF	(Uruguay) URU	Facundo Píriz	14	1	8+3	1	3	0
29	DF	(Australia) AUS	Luke Wilkshire	7	0	6	0	1	0
30	MF	(Romania) ROU	Gheorghe Grozav	21	2	9+9	2	3	0
31	MF	(Poland) POL	Maciej Rybus	31	9	22+6	9	2+1	0
40	DF	(Russia) RUS	Rizvan Utsiyev	21	1	19	1	2	0
55	MF	(Russia) RUS	Igor Lebedenko	26	2	16+9	2	0+1	0
93	FW	(Russia) RUS	Apti Akhyadov	2	0	0+1	0	0+1	0
95	FW	(Russia) RUS	Magomed Mitrishev	24	6	15+7	4	2	2
Players away from the club on loan:
Players who appeared for Terek Grozny no longer at the club:
8	MF	(Brazil) BRA	Maurício	18	3	15+2	3	0+1	0
13	DF	(Russia) RUS	Fyodor Kudryashov	15	0	13	0	2	0

=== Goal scorers ===
Place	Position	Nation	Number	Name	Premier League	Russian Cup	Total
1	MF	(Poland)	31	Maciej Rybus	9	0	9
2	FW	(Russia)	95	Magomed Mitrishev	4	2	6
3	FW	(Russia)	9	Zaur Sadayev	5	0	5
4	MF	(Brazil)	8	Maurício	3	0	3
4	FW	(Senegal)	17	Ablaye Mbengue	3	0	3
6	MF	(Russia)	55	Igor Lebedenko	2	0	2
6	MF	(Brazil)	6	Adílson	2	0	2
6	MF	(Romania)	30	Gheorghe Grozav	2	0	2
9	MF	(Uruguay)	23	Facundo Píriz	1	0	1
9	MF	(Morocco)	14	Ismaïl Aissati	1	0	1
9	DF	(Russia)	40	Rizvan Utsiyev	1	0	1
9	MF	(Russia)	19	Oleg Ivanov	1	0	1
9	MF	(Russia)	7	Khalid Kadyrov	0	1	1
9	FW	(Brazil)	20	Kanu	0	1	1
9				Own goal	1	0	1
				TOTALS	34	4	38

=== Disciplinary record ===
Number	Nation	Position	Name	Premier League		Russian Cup		Total	
Number	Nation	Position	Name	Yellow card	Red card	Yellow card	Red card	Yellow card	Red card
2	(Brazil)	DF	Rodolfo	8	0	1	0	9	0
5	(Russia)	DF	Zaurbek Pliyev	1	0	0	0	1	0
6	(Brazil)	MF	Adílson	6	0	0	0	6	0
8	(Brazil)	MF	Maurício	5	0	0	0	5	0
9	(Russia)	FW	Zaur Sadayev	4	0	0	0	4	0
13	(Russia)	DF	Fyodor Kudryashov	3	0	0	0	3	0
15	(Russia)	DF	Andrei Semyonov	7	0	0	0	7	0
16	(Russia)	GK	Yevgeni Gorodov	2	0	0	0	2	0
17	(Senegal)	FW	Ablaye Mbengue	2	0	0	0	2	0
19	(Russia)	MF	Oleg Ivanov	8	0	1	0	9	0
21	(Russia)	MF	Daler Kuzyayev	5	0	0	0	5	0
23	(Uruguay)	MF	Facundo Píriz	2	0	0	0	2	0
29	(Australia)	DF	Luke Wilkshire	4	1	1	0	5	1
30	(Romania)	MF	Gheorghe Grozav	4	0	0	0	4	0
31	(Poland)	MF	Maciej Rybus	2	0	0	0	2	0
40	(Russia)	DF	Rizvan Utsiyev	4	0	0	0	4	0
55	(Russia)	MF	Igor Lebedenko	3	1	0	0	3	1
95	(Russia)	FW	Magomed Mitrishev	3	0	0	0	3	0
			TOTALS	69	2	3	0	72	2
