= 2014–15 FC Terek Grozny season =

FC Terek Grozny
2014–15 season
- Chairman: Ramzan Kadyrov
- Manager: Rashid Rakhimov
- Stadium: Akhmat-Arena
- Russian Premier League: 9th
- Russian Cup: Round of 32 vs Gazovik Orenburg
- Top goalscorer: League: Aílton (5); All: Aílton (5)
- Highest home attendance: 22,730 vs Rubin Kazan'; 9 August 2014
- Lowest home attendance: 8,000 vs Kuban Krasnodar; 15 September 2014
- Average home league attendance: 14,746; 31 May 2015
Home colours	Away colours

The 2014–15 FC Terek Grozny season was the sixth successive season that the club will play in the Russian Premier League, the highest tier of association football in Russia, and 7th in total. Terek Grozny will also be taking part in the Russian Cup.

== Squad ==
As of match played 30 May 2015

No.	Name	Nationality	Position	Date of birth (age)	Signed from	Signed in	Contract ends	Apps.	Goals
Goalkeepers
1	Yaroslav Hodzyur	(Ukraine)	GK	6 March 1985 (aged 30)	Dynamo-2 Kyiv	2008		94	0
16	Yevgeni Gorodov	(Russia)	GK	13 December 1985 (aged 29)	Krasnodar	2013		14	0
33	Vitali Gudiyev	(Russia)	GK	22 April 1995 (aged 20)	Alania Vladikavkaz	2014		0	0
51	Yevgeni Kobozev	(Russia)	GK	11 January 1990 (aged 25)	Ufa	2013		0	0
Defenders
2	Rodolfo	(Brazil)	DF	23 October 1982 (aged 32)	Vasco da Gama	2015		6	0
3	Adolphe Teikeu	(Cameroon)	DF	23 June 1990 (aged 24)	loan from Chornomorets Odesa	2015		1	0
4	Juhani Ojala	(Finland)	DF	19 June 1989 (aged 25)	Young Boys	2013		26	0
13	Fyodor Kudryashov	(Russia)	DF	5 April 1987 (aged 28)	Spartak Moscow	2012		61	0
15	Andrei Semyonov	(Russia)	DF	24 March 1989 (aged 26)	Amkar Perm	2013		43	2
24	Marcin Komorowski	(Poland)	DF	17 April 1984 (aged 31)	Legia Warsaw	2012		83	7
40	Rizvan Utsiyev	(Russia)	DF	7 February 1988 (aged 27)	Trainee	2005			
90	Murad Tagilov	(Russia)	DF	27 January 1990 (aged 25)	Trainee	2008		6	0
Midfielders
6	Adílson	(Brazil)	MF	16 January 1987 (aged 28)	Grêmio	2011		77	1
8	Maurício	(Brazil)	MF	21 October 1988 (aged 26)	Fluminense	2010		154	26
10	Kanu	(Brazil)	MF	23 September 1987 (aged 27)	Anderlecht	2013		53	2
14	Ismaïl Aissati	(Morocco)	MF	16 August 1988 (aged 26)	Antalyaspor	2013		38	1
19	Oleg Ivanov	(Russia)	MF	4 August 1986 (aged 28)	Rostov	2012		99	8
22	Daler Kuzyayev	(Russia)	MF	15 January 1993 (aged 22)	Neftekhimik Nizhnekamsk	2014		22	0
23	Facundo Píriz	(Uruguay)	MF	27 March 1990 (aged 25)	Nacional	2013	2017	34	1
31	Maciej Rybus	(Poland)	MF	19 August 1989 (aged 25)	Legia Warsaw	2012		78	10
37	Mohammed Fuseini	(Ghana)	MF	2 July 1992 (aged 22)	Real Tamale United	2013		0	0
55	Igor Lebedenko	(Russia)	MF	27 May 1983 (aged 32)	Rubin Kazan	2012		103	15
88	Ayub Magamayev	(Russia)	MF		Trainee			0	0
Forwards
7	Khalid Kadyrov	(Russia)	FW	19 April 1994 (aged 21)	Trainee	2010		7	0
9	Aílton	(Brazil)	FW	20 August 1984 (aged 30)	APOEL	2012	2015	87	21
17	Ablaye Mbengue	(Senegal)	FW	19 May 1992 (aged 23)	Sapins	2015		5	4
18	Jeremy Bokila	(Democratic Republic of the Congo)	FW	14 November 1988 (aged 26)	Zulte Waregem	2013		40	9
22	Marko Šćepović	(Serbia)	FW	23 May 1991 (aged 24)	loan from Olympiacos	2015	2015	1	0
64	Radzhab Isayev	(Russia)	FW		Trainee			0	0
92	Khalit Saytkhadzhiyev	(Russia)	FW		Trainee			0	0
93	Apti Akhyadov	(Russia)	FW	24 August 1993 (aged 21)	Trainee	2011		0	0
Out on Loan
11	Zaur Sadayev	(Russia)	FW	6 November 1989 (aged 25)	Trainee	2006			
95	Magomed Mitrishev	(Russia)	FW	10 September 1992 (aged 22)	Spartak Nalchik	2012		22	2
	Adlan Katsayev	(Russia)	MF	20 February 1988 (aged 27)	Trainee	2005			
	Gheorghe Grozav	(Romania)	FW	10 September 1992 (aged 22)	Petrolul Ploiești	2013		10	1
Left During the Season
5	Antonio Ferreira	(Brazil)	DF	24 October 1984 (aged 30)	Spartak Nalchik	2010		103	3

=== Out on loan ===
Note: Flags indicate national team as defined under FIFA eligibility rules; some limited exceptions apply. Players may hold more than one non-FIFA nationality.

No.	Pos.	Nation	Player
95	FW	RUS	Magomed Mitrishev (at Anzhi Makhachkala)
—	MF	ROU	Gheorghe Grozav (at Dinamo București)

No.	Pos.	Nation	Player
—	MF	RUS	Adlan Katsayev (at Lechia Gdańsk)
—	FW	RUS	Zaur Sadayev (at Lech Poznań)

== Transfers ==
=== In ===
Date	Position	Nationality	Name	From	Fee	Ref.
24 February 2015	FW	(Senegal)	Ablaye Mbengue	Sapins	Undisclosed	
6 March 2015	DF	(Brazil)	Rodolfo	Vasco da Gama	Undisclosed	
	MF	(Russia)	Ayub Magamayev	Youth Team	Promoted	
	FW	(Russia)	Radzhab Isayev	Youth Team	Promoted	
	FW	(Russia)	Khalit Saytkhadzhiyev	Youth Team	Promoted	

=== Out ===
Date	Position	Nationality	Name	To	Fee	Ref.
21 June 2014	MF	(Poland)	Maciej Makuszewski	Lechia Gdańsk	Undisclosed	
31 December 2014	DF	(Brazil)	Antonio Ferreira	Bragantino	Undisclosed	

=== Loans in ===
Date from	Position	Nationality	Name	From	Date to	Ref.
24 February 2015	DF	(Cameroon)	Adolphe Teikeu	Chornomorets Odesa	End of Season	
25 February 2015	FW	(Serbia)	Marko Šćepović	Olympiacos	End of Season	

=== Loans out ===
Date from	Position	Nationality	Name	To	Date to	Ref.
20 June 2014	FW	(Russia)	Magomed Mitrishev	Anzhi Makhachkala	End of Season	
21 June 2014	MF	(Russia)	Adlan Katsayev	Lechia Gdańsk	End of Season	
21 June 2014	FW	(Russia)	Zaur Sadayev	Lechia Gdańsk	27 August 2014	
29 August 2014	FW	(Russia)	Zaur Sadayev	Lech Poznań	End of Season	
1 February 2015	MF	(Romania)	Gheorghe Grozav	Dinamo București	End of Season	

=== Released ===
Date	Position	Nationality	Name	Joined	Date
	MF	(Russia)	Magomed-Emi Shapiyev		
	MF	(Russia)	Sulim Didigov		
	MF	(Russia)	Tamerlan Saidkhadzhiyev		

== Friendlies ==
25 June 2014	Terek Grozny	0–0	Wiener Neustadt (Austria)	Austria
20:00 MSK		Report		Attendance: 200

29 June 2014	Terek Grozny	1–4	Metalurh Donetsk (Ukraine)	Bad Tatzmannsdorf, Austria
20:00 MSK	Garisultanov 58'	Report	Lazić 5'; Ferreira 9' (o.g.); Degtyarev 43'; Morozyuk 62'

2 July 2014	Terek Grozny	5–0	Szombathelyi Haladás (Hungary)	Untershyuttsen, Austria
20:00 MSK	Ailton 4', 29'; Rybus 28'; Bokila 53'; Kadiyev 75'	Report		Attendance: 150

2 July 2014	Terek Grozny	4–2	Aalen (Germany)	Mindelheim, Germany
20:00 MSK	Bokila 6', 18'; Kadyrov 80'; Komorowski 90+1'	Report	Grech 50' (pen.); Kvarner 69'	Attendance: 100

== Competitions ==
=== Russian Premier League ===
==== Results by round ====
Round	1	2	3	4	5	6	7	8	9	10	11	12	13	14	15	16	17	18	19	20	21	22	23	24	25	26	27	28	29	30
Ground	H	H	A	H	H	A	H	A	H	A	A	H	A	A	H	H	H	H	A	A	A	H	A	H	A	A	H	A	A	H
Result	W	D	L	W	W	W	D	D	W	L	L	W	W	L	L	L	D	L	L	L	W	L	D	D	L	W	W	D	L	L
Position	4	4	8	8	6	4	6	6	5	6	7	4	4	6	9	8	9	9	9	9	9	9	9	9	9	8	8	8	9	9

Updated to match(es) played on 31 May 2015. Source: Russian Premier League
A = Away; H = Home; W = Win; D = Draw; L = Loss

==== Matches ====
4 August 2014 1	Terek Grozny	4–0	Amkar Perm'	Grozny
20:00 MSK (UTC+4)	Rybus 64', 88'; Lebedenko 76'; Maurício 80'	Summary		Stadium: Akhmat-Arena; Attendance: 15,000; Referee: Aleksey Eskov

9 August 2014 2	Terek Grozny	1–1	Rubin Kazan'	Grozny
20:00 MSK (UTC+4)	Aílton 59'	Summary	Azmoun 87'	Stadium: Akhmat-Arena; Attendance: 22,730; Referee: Alexy Nikolaev

13 August 2014 3	CSKA Moscow	1–0	Terek Grozny	Moscow
20:00 MSK (UTC+4)	Tošić 4'	Summary		Stadium: Arena Khimki; Attendance: 6,000; Referee: Aleksandr Egorov

18 August 2014 4	Terek Grozny	1–0	Mordovia Saransk	Grozny
20:00 MSK (UTC+4)	Utsiyev 69'	Summary		Stadium: Akhmat-Arena; Attendance: 17,235; Referee: Sergei Karasev

22 August 2014 5	Terek Grozny	3–0	Arsenal Tula	Grozny
20:00 MSK (UTC+4)	Lebedenko 19'; Maurício 32'; Komorowski 45'	Summary		Stadium: Akhmat-Arena; Attendance: 15,225; Referee: Sergey Lapochkin

29 August 2014 6	Ural	0–1	Terek Grozny	Yekaterinburg
18:00 MSK (UTC+4)		Summary	Ivanov 68'	Stadium: Central Stadium; Attendance: 7,840; Referee: Igor Fedotov

15 September 2014 7	Terek Grozny	0–0	Kuban Krasnodar	Grozny
20:00 MSK (UTC+4)		Summary	Kaboré (yellow card) 13' (yellow-red card) 64'	Stadium: Akhmat-Arena; Attendance: 8,000; Referee: Sergei Ivanov

20 September 2014 8	Spartak Moscow	1–1	Terek Grozny	Moscow
20:00 MSK (UTC+4)	Jurado 90+1'	Summary	Maurício 14'	Stadium: Otkrytie Arena; Attendance: 25,620; Referee: Aleksandr Egorov

28 September 2014 9	Terek Grozny	2–1	Rostov	Grozny
21:00 MSK (UTC+4)	Rybus 21'; Utsiev 78'	Summary	Grigoryev 23'; Goreux (yellow card) 32' (yellow-red card) 59'	Stadium: Akhmat-Arena; Attendance: 17,230; Referee: Sergey Karasev

20 October 2014 10	Lokomotiv Moscow	2–1	Terek Grozny	Moscow
19:30 MSK (UTC+4)	Niasse 9'; Pavlyuchenko 73' (pen.)	Summary	Niasse 43' (o.g.)	Stadium: Lokomotiv Stadium; Attendance: 7,240; Referee: Sergei Ivanov

27 October 2014 11	Krasnodar	2–0	Terek Grozny	Krasnodar
18:45 MSK (UTC+3)	Joãozinho 60' (pen.); Ari (yellow card) 63'; Laborde 77' (yellow card) 77'; Gazinskiy (yellow card) 79'	Summary	Komorowski (yellow card) 74'	Stadium: Kuban Stadium; Attendance: 2,680; Referee: Sergey Lapochkin

3 November 2014 12	Terek Grozny	1–0	Ufa	Grozny
19:00 MSK (UTC+3)	Bokila 45+2'	Summary	Tumasyan (yellow card) 27' (yellow-red card) 85'	Stadium: Akhmat-Arena; Attendance: 14,320; Referee: Igor Fedotov

8 November 2014 13	Zenit St.Petersburg	1–3	Terek Grozny	Saint Petersburg
19:00 MSK (UTC+3)	Ryazantsev 63'	Summary	Aílton 17', 55'; Lebedenko 61'	Stadium: Petrovsky Stadium; Attendance: 15,244; Referee: Vitali Meshkov

23 November 2014 14	Dynamo Moscow	3–0	Terek Grozny	Moscow
13:30 MSK (UTC+3)	Yusupov (yellow card) 16'; Kokorin 26' (yellow card) 53'; Kurányi 29', 86' (pen.); Gabulov (yellow card) 66'; Noboa (yellow card) 82'	Summary	Kudryashov (yellow card) 51'; Semyonov (yellow card) 59'; Ivanov (yellow card) 64'	Stadium: Arena Khimki; Attendance: 4,856; Referee: Sergei Ivanov

30 November 2014 15	Terek Grozny	0–1	Krasnodar	Grozny
18:30 MSK (UTC+3)	Aílton (yellow card) 67'	Summary	Wánderson 18'; Izmailov (yellow card) 41'; Gazinskiy (yellow card) 48'; Ari (yellow card) 86'; Pereyra (yellow card) 90+4'	Stadium: Akhmat-Arena; Attendance: 14,353; Referee: Igor Nizovtsev

3 December 2014 16	Terek Grozny	0–1	Torpedo Moscow	Grozny
20:00 MSK (UTC+3)	Lebedenko (yellow card) 58'; Komorowski (yellow card) 60'; Kuzyayev (yellow card) 68'; Ivanov (yellow card) 90+2'; Utsiyev (yellow card) 90+3'	Summary	Putsila 45'; Stevanović (yellow card) 77'	Stadium: Akhmat-Arena; Attendance: 11,231; Referee: Sergey Lapochkin

7 December 2014 17	Terek Grozny	0–0	Lokomotiv Moscow	Grozny
13:30 MSK (UTC+3)	Semyonov (yellow card) 55'; Ivanov (yellow card) 90+2'	Summary	Ćorluka (yellow card) 45+1'; Sheshukov (yellow card) 47'	Stadium: Akhmat-Arena; Attendance: 19,435; Referee: Aleksandr Egorov

7 March 2015 18	Terek Grozny	1–2	CSKA Moscow	Grozny
16:00 MSK (UTC+3)	Ivanov (yellow card) 41'; Lebedenko 61'; Kudryashov (yellow card) 67'; Bokila (yellow card) 82'	Summary	Akinfeev (yellow card) 36'; Musa 45+3', 76'; Eremenko (yellow card) 90'	Stadium: Akhmat-Arena; Attendance: 8,900; Referee: Vitali Meshkov

15 March 2015 19	Rubin Kazan'	2–1	Terek Grozny	Kazan
15:30 MSK (UTC+3)	Kanunnikov 15'; Portnyagin 44'; Navas (yellow card) 50'; Livaja (yellow card) 90+3'	Summary	Kanu (yellow card) 62'; Kudryashov (red card) 76'; Komorowski 83'; Semyonov (yellow card) 90+3'	Stadium: Kazan Arena; Attendance: 3,597; Referee: Sergei Ivanov

22 March 2015 20	Kuban Krasnodar	1–0	Terek Grozny	Krasnodar
18:30 MSK (UTC+3)	Bugayev (yellow card) 37'; Kaboré (yellow card) 49'; Tkachyov 62'; Rabiu (yellow card) 65'; Ignatyev (yellow card) 90+1'; Kulik (yellow card) 90+1'	Summary	Lebedenko (yellow card) 64'; Ivanov (yellow card) 77'; Bokila (yellow card) 90+1'	Stadium: Kuban Stadium; Attendance: 8,497; Referee: Vladislav Bezborodov

5 April 2015 21	Ufa	0–1	Terek Grozny	Saransk
18:00 MSK (UTC+3)	Zaseyev (yellow card) 39'; Safronidi (yellow card) 59'	Summary	Komorowski 67'; Rybus (yellow card) 73'; Kanu (yellow card) 90+3'	Stadium: Start Stadium; Attendance: 1,243; Referee: Sergey Kostevich

8 April 2015 22	Terek Grozny	1–2	Zenit St.Petersburg	Grozny
17:45 MSK (UTC+3)	Semyonov 17'; Komorowski (yellow card) 17'; Kanu (yellow card) 25'; Adílson (yellow card) 54'; Utsiyev (yellow card) 66'	Summary	Neto (yellow card) 17'; Shatov 30'; Rondón 58' (yellow card) 89'; Witsel (yellow card) 66'; Hulk (yellow card) 66'; Anyukov (yellow card) 83'	Stadium: Akhmat-Arena; Attendance: 21,324; Referee: Aleksey Eskov

13 April 2015 23	Torpedo Moscow	0–0	Terek Grozny	Ramensky District
18:00 MSK (UTC+3)	Franjic (yellow card) 68'	Summary	Komorowski (yellow card) 34'; Maurício (yellow card) 61' (yellow-red card) 90'; Ivanov (yellow card) 69'	Stadium: Saturn Stadium; Attendance: 14,000; Referee: Vitaly Rushakov

19 April 2015 24	Terek Grozny	0–0	Dynamo Moscow	Grozny
16:00 MSK (UTC+3)	Utsiyev (yellow card) 39'; Ivanov (yellow card) 85'	Summary	Vainqueur (yellow card) 40'	Stadium: Akhmat-Arena; Attendance: 8,100; Referee: Sergey Lapochkin

25 April 2015 25	Amkar Perm	2–1	Terek Grozny	Perm
13:00 MSK (UTC+3)	Prudnikov 20'; Jovičić 62'; Ogude (yellow card) 71'; Gol (yellow card) 79'	Summary	Kuzyayev (yellow card) 19'; Maurício 26'; Rodolfo (yellow card) 86'	Stadium: Zvezda Stadium; Attendance: 5,900; Referee: Sergey Kulikov

2 May 2015 26	Rostov	0–1	Terek Grozny	Rostov-on-Don
19:00 MSK (UTC+3)	Torbinski (yellow card) 66'; Grigoryev (yellow card) 67'; Gațcan (yellow card) 78'; Bardachow (yellow card) 84'; Novoseltsev (yellow card) 88'	Summary	Kuzyayev (yellow card) 14'; Rybus (yellow card) 28'; Rodolfo (yellow card) 52'; Mbengue 83'	Stadium: Olimp-2; Attendance: 12,325; Referee: Alexey Nikolaev

11 May 2015 27	Terek Grozny	4–2	Spartak Moscow	Grozny
13:30 MSK (UTC+3)	Rodolfo (yellow card) 29'; Ivanov (red card) 40'; Semyonov (yellow card) 45+1'; Mbengue 49', 53'; Aílton 90', 90+2'	Summary	Tasci (yellow card) 2'; Krotov 27'; Källström (yellow card) 31'; Davydov (yellow card) 39'; Promes 75'	Stadium: Akhmat-Arena; Attendance: 16,833; Referee: Vitaly Meshkov

16 May 2015 28	Arsenal Tula	1–1	Terek Grozny	Moscow
16:30 MSK (UTC+3)	Karytska (yellow card) 30'; Kutyin 39'; Tesák (yellow card) 52'; Kašćelan (yellow card) 61'; Lyakh (yellow card) 80'	Summary	Mbengue 23'; Kuzyayev (yellow card) 38'; Hodzyur (yellow card) 69'	Stadium: Lokomotiv Stadium; Attendance: 9,200; Referee: Igor Fedotov

24 May 2015 29	Mordovia Saransk	1–0	Terek Grozny	Saransk
16:00 MSK (UTC+3)	Ebecilio 61' (yellow card) 70'	Summary	Kudryashov (yellow card) 29' (yellow-red card) 56'	Stadium: Start Stadium; Attendance: 4,424; Referee: Aleksey Eskov

30 May 2015 30	Terek Grozny	1–3	Ural	Grozny
13:30 MSK (UTC+3)	Ivanov (yellow card) 16'; Yemelyanov 38' (o.g.); Rodolfo (yellow card) 48'; Lebedenko (yellow card) 61'; Utsiyev (red card) 83'; Mbengue (yellow card) 89'	Summary	Gogniyev 40'; Khozin 45+1'; Sapeta (yellow card) 72'; Serchenkov (yellow card) 83' (goal) 88'	Stadium: Akhmat-Arena; Attendance: 11,274; Referee: Vladislav Bezborodov

==== League table ====
Pos	Team	Pld	W	D	L	GF	GA	GD	Pts	Qualification or relegation
7	Lokomotiv Moscow	30	11	10	9	31	25	+6	43	Qualification for the Europa League group stage (Note: Lokomotiv Moscow qualified for Europa League group stage by winning the 2014–15 Russian Cup.)
8	Mordovia Saransk	30	11	5	14	22	43	−21	38	
9	Terek Grozny	30	10	7	13	30	30	0	37	
10	Kuban Krasnodar	30	8	12	10	32	36	−4	36	
11	Amkar Perm	30	8	8	14	25	42	−17	32	

Source: Russian Premier League
Rules for classification: 1) points; 2) number of matches won; 3) head-to-head points; 4) head-to-head wins; 5) head-to-head goal difference; 6) head-to-head goals; 7) number of head-to-head away goals; 8) goal difference; 9) number of goals scored; 10) number of away goals scored

=== Russian Cup ===
24 September 2014 Round of 32	Gazovik Orenburg	2–1	Terek Grozny	Orenburg
14:00 MSK (UTC+4)	Kobyalko 16', 90+2' (pen.)	Report	Aissati 31' (pen.); Utsiyev (yellow card) 45'; Kanu (yellow card) 59'; Bokila (yellow card) 84'; Ivanov (yellow card) 90'	Stadium: Gazovik Stadium; Attendance: 1,300; Referee: Evgeny Turbin

== Squad statistics ==
As of match played 30 May 2015

=== Appearances and goals ===
No.	Pos	Nat	Player	Total		Premier League		Russian Cup	
No.	Pos	Nat	Player	Apps	Goals	Apps	Goals	Apps	Goals
1	GK	(Ukraine) UKR	Yaroslav Hodzyur	28	0	28	0	0	0
2	DF	(Brazil) BRA	Rodolfo	6	0	4+2	0	0	0
3	DF	(Cameroon) CMR	Adolphe Teikeu	1	0	0+1	0	0	0
4	DF	(Finland) FIN	Juhani Ojala	2	0	0+1	0	1	0
6	MF	(Brazil) BRA	Adílson	23	0	21+2	0	0	0
7	MF	(Russia) RUS	Khalid Kadyrov	5	0	2+3	0	0	0
8	MF	(Brazil) BRA	Maurício	29	4	27+1	4	1	0
9	FW	(Brazil) BRA	Aílton	31	5	25+5	5	0+1	0
10	MF	(Brazil) BRA	Kanu	19	0	6+12	0	1	0
13	DF	(Russia) RUS	Fyodor Kudryashov	27	0	27	0	0	0
14	MF	(Morocco) MAR	Ismaïl Aissati	25	1	7+17	0	1	1
15	DF	(Russia) RUS	Andrei Semyonov	30	1	29	1	1	0
16	GK	(Russia) RUS	Yevgeni Gorodov	3	0	2	0	1	0
17	FW	(Senegal) SEN	Ablaye Mbengue	5	4	4+1	4	0	0
18	FW	(Democratic Republic of the Congo) COD	Jeremy Bokila	18	1	3+14	1	1	0
19	MF	(Russia) RUS	Oleg Ivanov	28	1	25+2	1	0+1	0
21	MF	(Russia) RUS	Daler Kuzyayev	22	0	13+8	0	1	0
22	FW	(Serbia) SRB	Marko Šćepović	1	0	0+1	0	0	0
23	MF	(Uruguay) URU	Facundo Píriz	12	0	3+8	0	1	0
24	DF	(Poland) POL	Marcin Komorowski	26	3	25+1	3	0	0
31	MF	(Poland) POL	Maciej Rybus	28	3	26+1	3	0+1	0
40	DF	(Russia) RUS	Rizvan Utsiyev	25	2	24	2	1	0
55	MF	(Russia) RUS	Igor Lebedenko	30	4	26+3	4	1	0
Players away from the club on loan:
Players who appeared for Terek Grozny no longer at the club:
5	DF	(Brazil) BRA	Antonio Ferreira	2	0	2	0	0	0

=== Goal scorers ===
Place	Position	Nation	Number	Name	Premier League	Russian Cup	Total
1	FW	(Brazil)	9	Aílton	5	0	5
2	MF	(Russia)	55	Igor Lebedenko	4	0	4
2	MF	(Brazil)	8	Maurício	4	0	4
2	FW	(Senegal)	17	Ablaye Mbengue	4	0	4
5	MF	(Poland)	31	Maciej Rybus	3	0	3
5	DF	(Poland)	24	Marcin Komorowski	3	0	3
7	DF	(Russia)	40	Rizvan Utsiyev	2	0	2
8	MF	(Russia)	19	Oleg Ivanov	1	0	1
8	FW	(Democratic Republic of the Congo)	18	Jeremy Bokila	1	0	1
8	DF	(Russia)	15	Andrei Semyonov	1	0	1
8				Own goal	1	0	1
8	MF	(Morocco)	19	Ismaïl Aissati	0	1	1
				TOTALS	29	1	30

=== Disciplinary record ===
Number	Nation	Position	Name	Premier League		Russian Cup		Total	
Number	Nation	Position	Name	Yellow card	Red card	Yellow card	Red card	Yellow card	Red card
1	(Ukraine)	GK	Yaroslav Hodzyur	3	0	0	0	3	0
2	(Brazil)	DF	Rodolfo	4	0	0	0	4	0
6	(Brazil)	MF	Adílson	4	0	0	0	4	0
8	(Brazil)	MF	Maurício	4	1	0	0	4	1
9	(Brazil)	FW	Aílton	2	0	0	0	2	0
10	(Brazil)	MF	Kanu	3	0	1	0	4	0
13	(Russia)	DF	Fyodor Kudryashov	8	2	0	0	8	2
15	(Russia)	DF	Andrei Semyonov	7	0	0	0	7	0
17	(Senegal)	FW	Ablaye Mbengue	1	0	0	0	1	0
18	(Democratic Republic of the Congo)	FW	Jeremy Bokila	3	0	1	0	4	0
19	(Russia)	MF	Oleg Ivanov	12	1	1	0	13	1
21	(Russia)	MF	Daler Kuzyayev	4	0	0	0	4	0
24	(Poland)	DF	Marcin Komorowski	5	0	0	0	5	0
31	(Poland)	MF	Maciej Rybus	3	0	0	0	3	0
40	(Russia)	DF	Rizvan Utsiyev	6	1	1	0	7	1
55	(Russia)	MF	Igor Lebedenko	6	0	0	0	6	0
			TOTALS	75	5	4	0	79	5

== Notes ==
- MSK time changed from UTC+4 to UTC+3 permanently on 26 October 2014.
