= 2022–23 FC Akhmat Grozny season =

FC Akhmat Grozny
2022–23 season
- Chairman: Magomed Daudov
- Manager: Andrei Talalayev (until 11 September); Yury Nagaytsev (caretaker) (until 11-22 September); Sergei Tashuyev (from 22 September)
- Stadium: Akhmat-Arena
- Premier League: 5th
- Russian Cup: Regions path Quarter-finals Stage 2 vs Krasnodar
- Top goalscorer: League: Mohamed Konaté (11); All: Mohamed Konaté (13)
- Highest home attendance: 9,620 vs Zenit St.Petersburg (6 August 2024)
- Lowest home attendance: 3,965 vs Ural Yekaterinburg (8 April 2023)
- Average home league attendance: 6,633 (3 June 2023)
Home colours	Away colours

The 2022–23 FC Akhmat Grozny season was the 14th successive season that the club played in the Russian Premier League, the highest tier of association football in Russia. They finished the season in 5th position and also played in the Russian Cup, but were eliminated at the Regions path Quarter-finals Stage 2.

== Season events ==
On 11 September, Andrei Talalaev was sacked as Head Coach of Akhmat Grozny, with Yury Nagaytsev taking temporary charge. On 22 September, Sergei Tashuyev was announced as the new permanent Head Coach of Akhmat Grozny.

== Squad ==
As of match played 3 June 2023

No.	Name	Nationality	Position	Date of birth (age)	Signed from	Signed in	Contract ends	Apps.	Goals
Goalkeepers
1	Mikhail Oparin	(Russia)	GK	22 May 1993 (aged 30)	Yenisey Krasnoyarsk	2022		5	0
35	Rizvan Tashayev	(Russia)	GK	5 October 2003 (aged 19)	Academy	2022		1	0
88	Giorgi Sheliya	(Russia)	GK	11 December 1988 (aged 34)	Tambov	2020	2022 (+1)	67	0
Defenders
4	Darko Todorović	(Bosnia and Herzegovina)	DF	5 May 1997 (aged 26)	Red Bull Salzburg	2022		32	1
5	Miloš Šatara	(Bosnia and Herzegovina)	DF	28 October 1995 (aged 27)	Shakhtyor Soligorsk	2023		8	0
8	Miroslav Bogosavac	(Serbia)	DF	14 October 1996 (aged 26)	Čukarički	2020	2024	96	0
15	Andrei Semyonov	(Russia)	DF	24 March 1989 (aged 34)	Amkar Perm	2014		268	6
20	Zoran Nižić	(Croatia)	DF	11 October 1989 (aged 33)	Hajduk Split	2018		91	0
40	Rizvan Utsiyev	(Russia)	DF	7 February 1988 (aged 35)	Trainee	2005		295	8
59	Yevgeni Kharin	(Russia)	MF	11 June 1995 (aged 27)	Levadia Tallinn	2018		117	10
79	Turpal-Ali Ibishev	(Russia)	DF	18 February 2002 (aged 21)	Academy	2021		4	0
96	Marat Bystrov	(Kazakhstan)	DF	19 June 1992 (aged 30)	Ordabasy	2020		76	0
Midfielders
7	Bernard Berisha	(Kosovo)	MF	24 October 1991 (aged 31)	Anzhi Makhachkala	2016	2023	150	21
11	Lechi Sadulayev	(Russia)	MF	8 January 2000 (aged 23)	Academy	2018		74	7
17	Vladislav Karapuzov	(Russia)	MF	6 January 2000 (aged 23)	loan from Dynamo Moscow	2022	2023	54	3
18	Vladislav Kamilov	(Russia)	MF	29 August 1995 (aged 27)	Ufa	2022		25	2
21	Ivan Oleynikov	(Russia)	MF	24 August 1998 (aged 24)	Chayka Peschanokopskoye	2022		31	5
23	Anton Shvets	(Russia)	MF	26 April 1993 (aged 30)	Villarreal B	2017	2023	143	10
24	Zaim Divanović	(Montenegro)	MF	9 December 2000 (aged 22)	Shakhtyor Soligorsk	2023		6	0
25	Aleksandr Troshechkin	(Russia)	MF	23 April 1996 (aged 27)	Khimki	2022	2024	35	5
33	Minkail Matsuyev	(Russia)	MF	3 February 2000 (aged 23)	Unattached	2023		1	0
71	Magomed Yakuyev	(Russia)	MF	7 June 2004 (aged 18)	Academy	2022		3	0
92	Abubakar Inalkayev	(Russia)	MF	31 July 2004 (aged 18)	Academy	2021		8	0
94	Artyom Timofeyev	(Russia)	MF	12 January 1994 (aged 29)	Spartak Moscow	2021	2024	88	13
Forwards
13	Mohamed Konaté	(Burkina Faso)	FW	12 December 1997 (aged 25)	Khimki	2021	2022(+2)	55	21
29	Vladimir Ilyin	(Russia)	FW	20 May 1992 (aged 31)	Krasnodar	2022		74	17
47	Néné Gbamblé	(Ivory Coast)	FW	9 May 2002 (aged 19)	Celje	2023		5	1
77	Gamid Agalarov	(Russia)	FW	16 July 2000 (aged 20)	Ufa	2022		29	5
99	Ilya Chernyak	(Belarus)	FW	19 May 2002 (aged 18)	on loan from Shakhtyor Soligorsk	2023		3	0
Away on loan
Players that left Akhmat Grozny during the season
10	Khalid Kadyrov	(Russia)	FW	19 April 1994 (aged 29)	Trainee	2010		27	1
19	Kirill Folmer	(Russia)	MF	25 February 2000 (aged 23)	on loan from Rostov	2022		7	1
42	Aleksandr Melikhov	(Russia)	GK	23 March 1998 (aged 25)	Tom Tomsk	2019	2024	5	0
44	Yuri Zhuravlyov	(Russia)	MF	29 June 1996 (aged 26)	Ufa	2022		17	0
95	Abubakar Kadyrov	(Russia)	FW	26 August 1996 (aged 26)	Trainee	2012		5	1

== Transfers ==
=== In ===
Date	Position	Nationality	Name	From	Fee	Ref.
8 June 2022	DF	(Russia)	Yuri Zhuravlyov	Ufa	Undisclosed	
10 June 2022	GK	(Russia)	Mikhail Oparin	Yenisey Krasnoyarsk	Undisclosed	
17 June 2022	DF	(Bosnia and Herzegovina)	Darko Todorović	Red Bull Salzburg	Undisclosed	
23 June 2022	FW	(Russia)	Vladimir Ilyin	Krasnodar	Undisclosed	
4 July 2022	MF	(Russia)	Ivan Oleynikov	Chayka Peschanokopskoye	Undisclosed	
15 July 2022	FW	(Russia)	Gamid Agalarov	Ufa	Undisclosed	
4 September 2022	MF	(Russia)	Vladislav Kamilov	Ufa	Undisclosed	
12 January 2023	DF	(Bosnia and Herzegovina)	Miloš Šatara	Shakhtyor Soligorsk	Undisclosed	
12 January 2023	MF	(Montenegro)	Zaim Divanović	Shakhtyor Soligorsk	Undisclosed	
21 January 2023	FW	(Ivory Coast)	Néné Gbamblé	NK Celje	Undisclosed	
7 February 2023	FW	(Belarus)	Ilya Chernyak	Shakhtyor Soligorsk	Undisclosed	
22 February 2023	MF	(Russia)	Minkail Matsuyev	Unattached	Free	

=== Loans in ===
Date from	Position	Nationality	Name	From	Date to	Ref.
16 July 2022	MF	(Russia)	Kirill Folmer	Rostov	1 February 2023	
8 September 2022	MF	(Russia)	Vladislav Karapuzov	Dynamo Moscow	End of season	

=== Out ===
Date	Position	Nationality	Name	To	Fee	Ref.
1 July 2022	MF	(Poland)	Konrad Michalak	Konyaspor		
3 August 2022	GK	(Russia)	Aleksandr Melikhov	Urartu	Undisclosed	
17 August 2022	MF	(Russia)	Tamerlan Girzishev	Yessentuki		
28 December 2022	DF	(Russia)	Yuri Zhuravlyov	Torpedo Moscow	Undisclosed	

=== Loans out ===
Date from	Position	Nationality	Name	To	Date to	Ref.
5 July 2022	FW	(Russia)	Nikita Karmayev	Rotor Volgograd	End of season	
13 July 2022	MF	(Russia)	Ilya Moseychuk	Kuban Krasnodar	End of season	
20 July 2022	FW	(Romania)	Gabriel Iancu	U Craiova 1948	31 December 2022	
8 September 2022	FW	(Russia)	Idris Umayev	Yenisey Krasnoyarsk	31 December 2022	
13 February 2023	FW	(Romania)	Gabriel Iancu	Hermannstadt	End of season	
22 February 2023	FW	(Russia)	Idris Umayev	Aktobe	End of season	

=== Released ===
Date	Position	Nationality	Name	Joined	Date	Ref.
27 October 2022	FW	(Russia)	Abubakar Kadyrov	Retired		
27 October 2022	FW	(Russia)	Khalid Kadyrov	Retired		
31 December 2022	GK	(Russia)	Suliman Murtazayev	Kavala		

== Competitions ==
=== Overview ===
Competition	First match	Last match	Starting round	Final position	Record							
Competition	First match	Last match	Starting round	Final position	Pld	W	D	L	GF	GA	GD	Win %
Premier League	16 July 2023	3 June 2023	Matchday 1	5th	30	15	5	10	51	39	+12	50.00
Russian Cup	31 August 2022	15 March 2023	Group stage	Regions path Quarter-finals Stage 2	8	4	0	4	13	16	−3	50.00
Total					38	19	5	14	64	55	+9	50.00

Last updated: 3 June 2023
Source: Competitions

=== Premier League ===
==== Results summary ====
Overall								Home						Away					
Pld	W	D	L	GF	GA	GD	Pts	W	D	L	GF	GA	GD	W	D	L	GF	GA	GD
30	15	5	10	51	39	+12	50	7	3	5	21	17	+4	8	2	5	30	22	+8

Last updated: 3 June 2023.
Source: See Results

==== Results by round ====
Round	1	2	3	4	5	6	7	8	9	10	11	12	13	14	15	16	17	18	19	20	21	22	23	24	25	26	27	28	29	30
Ground	H	H	A	H	A	A	H	A	H	A	H	A	A	H	H	A	A	H	H	A	A	H	A	H	H	A	A	H	A	H
Result	D	W	L	D	W	L	L	W	L	W	W	L	W	W	L	W	L	W	L	W	D	W	D	W	L	W	W	W	L	D
Position	9	5	8	9	8	8	10	8	9	8	7	8	7	6	7	5	6	6	6	6	6	5	7	5	5	5	5	5	5	5

Updated to match(es) played on 3 June 2023. Source: See Results
A = Away; H = Home; W = Win; D = Draw; L = Loss

==== Results ====
16 July 2022 1	Akhmat Grozny	1 – 1	Spartak Moscow	Grozny
20:00 MSK (UTC+3)	Todorović (yellow card) 41'; Konaté (yellow card) 44'; Timofeyev 45+'; Shvets (yellow card) 72'; Folmer (yellow card) 79'; Sheliya (yellow card) 89'	Report	Rybus (yellow card) 41' (yellow-red card) 41'; Zinkovsky (yellow card) 59'; Promes (yellow card) 72'; Moses 84'	Stadium: Akhmat-Arena; Attendance: 8,051; Referee: Vladislav Bezborodov

24 July 2022 2	Akhmat Grozny	2 – 1	Fakel Voronezh	Grozny
20:00 MSK (UTC+3)	Ilyin 37'; Agalarov 64'; Shvets (yellow card) 66'	Report	Maksimov 27'; Akbashev (yellow card) 63'; Shavayev (yellow card) 74'	Stadium: Akhmat-Arena; Attendance: 8,550; Referee: Alexey Amelin

30 July 2022 3	Sochi	2 – 1	Akhmat Grozny	Sochi
20:00 MSK (UTC+3)	Tsallagov (yellow card) 4'; Meshchaninov (yellow card) 7'; Terekhov (yellow card) 12'; Noboa 20' (pen.), 49' (yellow card) 59'; Angban (yellow card) 45+'; Makarchuk (yellow card) 61'	Report	Todorović (yellow card) 5'; Berisha (yellow card) 21'; Troshechkin 60'	Stadium: Fisht Olympic Stadium; Attendance: 3,772; Referee: Artyom Lyubimov

6 August 2022 4	Akhmat Grozny	0 – 0	Zenit St.Petersburg	Grozny
20:00 MSK (UTC+3)	Troshechkin (yellow card) 11'; Sadulayev (yellow card) 45+'; Nižić (yellow card) 48'; Timofeyev (yellow card) 81'; Shvets (yellow card) 89'	Report	Lovren (yellow card) 32'; Sutormin (yellow card) 36'; Odoyevsky (red card) 41'	Stadium: Akhmat-Arena; Attendance: 9,620; Referee: Sergey Ivanov

14 August 2022 5	Khimki	1 – 3	Akhmat Grozny	Khimki
15:00 MSK (UTC+3)	Danilkin (yellow card) 20'; Lomovitsky 61'; Chyorny (yellow card) 71'	Report	Troshechkin 14'; Shvets 43'; Agalarov (yellow card) 84'; Timofeyev 90+'	Stadium: Arena Khimki; Attendance: 1,250; Referee: Kirill Levnikov

21 August 2022 6	CSKA Moscow	4 – 2	Akhmat Grozny	Moscow
15:00 MSK (UTC+3)	Nababkin (yellow card) 14' (goal) 33'; Chalov 29'; Carrascal 35'; Mukhin (yellow card) 44'; Medina 78'	Report	Nižić (yellow card) 23'; Konaté 41'; Berisha 58'	Stadium: VEB Arena; Attendance: 13,568; Referee: Sergei Karasev

27 August 2022 7	Akhmat Grozny	1 – 2	Krylia Sovetov	Grozny
20:00 MSK (UTC+3)	Konaté 5'; Oparin (red card) 30'; Shvets (yellow card) 45+'	Report	Yezhov (yellow card) 6' (goal) 11'; Bijl (yellow card) 47'; Kovalenko 72' (yellow card) 90+'; Khubulov (yellow card) 83'	Stadium: Akhmat-Arena; Attendance: 7,753; Referee: Anton Frolov

4 September 2022 8	Lokomotiv Moscow	1 – 2	Akhmat Grozny	Moscow
17:30 MSK (UTC+3)	Kerk (yellow card) 8'; Magkeyev (yellow card) 33'; Miranchuk 42' (pen.); Kamano (yellow card) 71'	Report	Konaté 3' (yellow card) 11' (yellow-red card) 28'; Bystrov (yellow card) 22'; Sadulayev 62'; Troshechkin (yellow card) 74'	Stadium: RZD Stadium; Attendance: 7,862; Referee: Evgeny Turbin

10 September 2022 9	Akhmat Grozny	1 – 3	Pari NN	Grozny
19:45 MSK (UTC+3)	Agalarov (penalty missed) 16'; Troshechkin (yellow card) 28'; Shvets (yellow card) 48'; Zhuravlyov 59'; Berisha (yellow card) 90'	Report	Suleymanov 22', 61' (yellow card) 84'; Krotov (yellow card) 36'; Maiga (yellow card) 52'; Rybchinsky (yellow card) 56'; Gotsuk 64'	Stadium: Akhmat-Arena; Attendance: 7,710; Referee: Pavel Shadykhanov

17 September 2022 10	Ural Yekaterinburg	1 – 2	Akhmat Grozny	Yekaterinburg
12:00 MSK (UTC+3)	Gadzhimuradov (yellow card) 53'; Bykovsky 85'	Report	Kharin 38'; Karapuzov (yellow card) 50'; Bystrov (yellow card) 61'; Berisha 90'	Stadium: Central Stadium; Attendance: 2,888; Referee: Evgeniy Kukulyak

2 October 2022 11	Akhmat Grozny	2 – 1	Dynamo Moscow	Grozny
19:00 MSK (UTC+3)	Kamilov (yellow card) 19'; Shvets 22'; Bystrov (yellow card) 25'; Sadulayev (yellow card) 39' (yellow-red card) 62' (goal) 44'	Report	Normann (yellow card) 28'; Laxalt (yellow card) 44'; Sazonov (yellow card) 52'; Gladyshev 90+'	Stadium: Akhmat-Arena; Attendance: 8,157; Referee: Vladislav Bezborodov

9 October 2022 12	Orenburg	2 – 1	Akhmat Grozny	Orenburg
16:30 MSK (UTC+3)	Pisarsky 53'; Ayupov 68'; Gojković (yellow card) 75'	Report	Konaté 28'; Berisha (yellow card) 41'; Shvets (yellow card) 74'	Stadium: Gazovik Stadium; Attendance: 4,512; Referee: Vladimir Moskalyov

15 October 2022 13	Krasnodar	2 – 3	Akhmat Grozny	Krasnodar
16:30 MSK (UTC+3)	Spertsyan 30'; Banjac (yellow card) 38' (goal) 55'; Krivtsov (yellow card) 90+'	Report	Berisha 18' (pen.); Timofeyev 35' (yellow card) 54'; Karapuzov (yellow card) 45+'; Sadulayev (yellow card) 65'; Kamilov (yellow card) 75'; Oleynikov (yellow card) 90+' (goal) 90+'	Stadium: Krasnodar Stadium; Attendance: 20,139; Referee: Yan Bobrovsky

23 October 2022 14	Akhmat Grozny	1 – 0	Torpedo Moscow	Grozny
19:00 MSK (UTC+3)	Konaté 41'; Semyonov (yellow card) 87'	Report	Smolnikov (yellow card) 29'; Savić (yellow card) 76'	Stadium: Akhmat-Arena; Attendance: 7,120; Referee: Artyom Chistyakov

29 October 2022 15	Akhmat Grozny	1 – 2	Rostov	Grozny
16:30 MSK (UTC+3)	Konaté 14'; Shvets (yellow card) 64'; Berisha (yellow card) 71'; Agalarov (yellow card) 83'	Report	Mironov (yellow card) 36'; Komlichenko 75' (yellow card) 90'; Silyanov 86'	Stadium: Akhmat-Arena; Attendance: 8,047; Referee: Vladislav Bezborodov

5 November 2022 16	Zenit St.Petersburg	1 – 2	Akhmat Grozny	Saint Petersburg
16:30 MSK (UTC+3)	Mostovoy 65'; Douglas (yellow card) 87'	Report	Kharin 1'; Konaté 8'; Timofeyev (yellow card) 46'	Stadium: Krestovsky Stadium; Attendance: 34,565; Referee: Pavel Kukuyan

11 November 2022 17	Pari NN	3 – 2	Akhmat Grozny	Nizhny Novgorod
19:00 MSK (UTC+3)	Maiga (yellow card) 7'; Mikhaylov 20'; Krotov (yellow card) 42'; Suleymanov 52'; Yuldoshev (yellow card) 55'; Rybchinsky 70'; Kornyushin (yellow card) 90+'	Report	Berisha (yellow card) 49'; Ilyin 73'; Timofeyev 86'	Stadium: Nizhny Novgorod Stadium; Attendance: 4,133; Referee: Alexey Amelin

4 March 2023 18	Akhmat Grozny	3 – 1	Orenburg	Grozny
16:30 MSK (UTC+3)	Kharin 11'; Berisha 45+'; Semyonov (yellow card) 60'; Timofeyev 90+'	Report	Malykh (yellow card) 9'; Sivakow (yellow card) 24' (yellow-red card) 45+'; Stamatov (yellow card) 35'; Vorobyov 45+'; Ayupov (yellow card) 47'; Pérez (yellow card) 60'; Goshev (yellow card) 61'	Stadium: Akhmat-Arena; Attendance: 4,100; Referee: Evgeny Turbin

11 March 2023 19	Akhmat Grozny	0 – 1	Lokomotiv Moscow	Grozny
16:30 MSK (UTC+3)	Sadulayev (yellow card) 29'; Shvets (yellow card) 67'; Agalarov (yellow card) 89'	Report	Magkeyev (yellow card) 9' (yellow-red card) 20'; Pinyayev 11'; Nenakhov (yellow card) 42' (yellow-red card) 60'; Lantratov (yellow card) 90'	Stadium: Akhmat-Arena; Attendance: 6,322; Referee: Pavel Kukuyan

19 March 2023 20	Krylia Sovetov	0 – 1	Akhmat Grozny	Samara
16:30 MSK (UTC+3)	Soldatenkov (yellow card) 13'; Lomayev (yellow card) 79'	Report	Timofeyev 46' (yellow card) 58'; Kharin (yellow card) 54'; Sadulayev (yellow card) 62'; Karapuzov (yellow card) 70'; Sheliya (yellow card) 90+'	Stadium: Solidarnost Samara Arena; Attendance: 2,324; Referee: Rafael Shafeev

1 April 2023 21	Spartak Moscow	0 – 0	Akhmat Grozny	Moscow
16:30 MSK (UTC+3)	Nicholson (yellow card) 25'; Baldé (yellow card) 55'; Khlusevich (yellow card) 76'	Report	Ilyin (yellow card) 44'; Sheliya (yellow card) 90+'	Stadium: Otkritie Arena; Attendance: 5,849; Referee: Alexey Sukhoi

8 April 2023 22	Akhmat Grozny	2 – 0	Ural Yekaterinburg	Grozny
16:30 MSK (UTC+3)	Kharin 4'; Berisha (yellow card) 30' (goal) 57'	Report	Miškić (yellow card) 7'; Goglichidze (yellow card) 33'; Filipenko (yellow card) 89'	Stadium: Akhmat-Arena; Attendance: 3,965; Referee: Pavel Shadykhanov

16 April 2023 23	Fakel Voronezh	1 – 1	Akhmat Grozny	Voronezh
16:30 MSK (UTC+3)	Kvekveskiri (yellow card) 28'; Bozhin 55'; Alshin (yellow card) 67'	Report	Timofeyev 15'; Konaté (yellow card) 49'; Ilyin (yellow card) 73'; Shvets (yellow card) 85'; Karapuzov (yellow card) 86'; Semyonov (yellow card) 86'	Stadium: Tsentralnyi Profsoyuz Stadion; Attendance: 8,885; Referee: Roman Galimov

23 April 2023 24	Akhmat Grozny	1 – 0	Sochi	Grozny
16:30 MSK (UTC+3)	Bogosavac (yellow card) 45+'; Ilyin 86'	Report	Terekhov (yellow card) 20'	Stadium: Akhmat-Arena; Attendance: 4,431; Referee: Artur Fedorov

29 April 2023 25	Akhmat Grozny	1 – 3	CSKA Moscow	Grozny
16:30 MSK (UTC+3)	Konaté 80'	Report	Oblyakov 3', 22'; Gajić (yellow card) 63'; Akinfeev (yellow card) 69'; Mukhin 90+'	Stadium: Akhmat-Arena; Attendance: 4,527; Referee: Alexey Amelin

6 May 2023 26	Torpedo Moscow	1 – 5	Akhmat Grozny	Moscow
16:30 MSK (UTC+3)	Lebedenko (yellow card) 45+'; Yuzepchuk (yellow card) 53'; Stefanovich 74'; Savić (yellow card) 81'; Karaev (yellow card) 81'	Report	Shvets (yellow card) 9'; Todorović 12'; Konaté 19', 77'; Kamilov 38'; Agalarov 89'	Stadium: Luzhniki Stadium

14 May 2023 27	Dynamo Moscow	0 – 3	Akhmat Grozny	Moscow
16:30 MSK (UTC+3)	Sazonov (yellow card) 13'; Smolov (yellow card) 64'	Report	Semyonov (yellow card) 12'; Gbamblé 38'; Konaté 57'; Ilyin 71'	Stadium: VTB Arena; Attendance: 7,091; Referee: Vladimir Moskalyov

20 May 2023 28	Akhmat Grozny	3 – 0	Khimki	Grozny
19:00 MSK (UTC+3)	Timofeyev (yellow card) 12' (goal) 49'; Karapuzov 28' (yellow card) 61'; Kamilov (yellow card) 54'; Kharin 63'; Todorović (yellow card) 69'; Yakuyev (yellow card) 90+'	Report	Melentijević (yellow card) 4'; Dolgov (yellow card) 45'; Gbane (yellow card) 90+'	Stadium: Akhmat-Arena; Attendance: 5,154; Referee: Vladislav Bezborodov

28 May 2023 29	Rostov	3 – 2	Akhmat Grozny	Rostov-on-Don
19:00 MSK (UTC+3)	Golenkov 6', 12' (yellow card) 45+'; Mironov (yellow card) 45+'; Glebov (yellow card) 45+'; Prokhin 73'; Langovich (yellow card) 76'	Report	Kharin (yellow card) 17'; Agalarov 32'; Kamilov (yellow card) 37'; Karapuzov 40' (yellow card) 82'; Semyonov (yellow card) 45+'; Todorović (yellow card) 45+'; Timofeyev (yellow card) 45+' (yellow-red card) 69'; Shvets (yellow card) 58'; Oleynikov (yellow card) 90'	Stadium: Rostov Arena; Attendance: 9,717; Referee: Vitali Meshkov

3 June 2023 30	Akhmat Grozny	2 – 2	Krasnodar	Grozny
17 MSK (UTC+3)	Kharin (yellow card) 35'; Kamilov 70' (yellow card) 83'; Oleynikov 78'; Karapuzov (yellow card) 82'; Sheliya (yellow card) 89'; Alsultanov (yellow card) 90+'	Report	Ionov (yellow card) 26'; Arutyunyan (yellow card) 39'; Córdoba 66' (yellow card) 83'; Olusegun 90+'	Stadium: Akhmat-Arena; Attendance: 5,987; Referee: Rafael Shafeev

==== League table ====
Pos	Team	Pld	W	D	L	GF	GA	GD	Pts
3	Spartak Moscow	30	15	9	6	60	38	+22	54
4	Rostov	30	15	8	7	48	44	+4	53
5	Akhmat Grozny	30	15	5	10	51	39	+12	50
6	Krasnodar	30	13	9	8	62	46	+16	48
7	Orenburg	30	14	4	12	58	55	+3	46

Source: Premier Liga
Rules for classification: 1) Points; 2) Head-to-head points; 3) Head-to-head matches won; 4) Head-to-head goal difference; 5) Head-to-head goals scored; 6) Matches won; 7) Goal difference; 8) Goals scored; 9) 2021–22 position (not applicable to final standings); 10) Play-off.

=== Russian Cup ===
==== Group stage ====
Pos	Team	Pld	W	PW	PL	L	GF	GA	GD	Pts	Qualification
1	Dynamo Moscow	6	3	0	1	2	9	8	+1	10	Qualification to the Knockout phase (RPL path)
2	Rostov	6	3	0	0	3	12	11	+1	9 (Note: Head-to-head goal difference: Rostov +1, Akhmat -1.)	Qualification to the Knockout phase (RPL path)
3	Akhmat Grozny	6	3	0	0	3	11	12	−1	9	Qualification to the Knockout phase (regions path)
4	Orenburg	6	2	1	0	3	12	13	−1	8	

Source: Russian Football Union (in Russian), Soccerway
Rules for classification: 1) Points; 2) Head-to-head points; 3) Head-to-head matches won; 4) Head-to-head goal difference; 5) Head-to-head goals scored; 6) Matches won; 7) Goal difference; 8) Goals scored; 9) Penalty shoot-out goal difference; 10) Draw.
Notes:

31 August 2022 1	Akhmat Grozny	3 – 1	Orenburg	Grozny
20:30 MSK (UTC+3)	Folmer 26'; Sadulayev 32'; Ilyin 51'; Troshechkin (yellow card) 55'; K.Kadyrov (yellow card) 90+4'	Report	Nikolayev (yellow card) 15'; Sychevoy 77'	Stadium: Akhmat-Arena; Attendance: 7,340; Referee: Sergey Cheban

13 September 2022 2	Dynamo Moscow	2 – 1	Akhmat Grozny	Moscow
17:30 MSK (UTC+3)	Smolov 11'; Gladyshev 31'	Report	Oleynikov 18'; Bystrov (yellow card) 55'; Shvets (yellow card) 89'	Stadium: VTB Arena; Attendance: 6,175; Referee: Vasily Kazartsev

29 September 2022 3	Akhmat Grozny	3 – 1	Rostov	Grozny
15:00 MSK (UTC+3)	Shvets (yellow card) 27'; Oleynikov 73' (pen.), 79'; Karapuzov (yellow card) 87'; Konaté 88'	Report	Tugarev 59'; Prokhin (yellow card) 72'; Glebov (yellow card) 90+3'	Stadium: Akhmat-Arena; Attendance: 7,008; Referee: Aleksey Amelin

19 October 2022 4	Orenburg	4 – 2	Akhmat Grozny	Orenburg
15:30 MSK (UTC+3)	Vorobyov 20' (pen.); Oganesyan 31'; Poluyakhtov 45+1'; Malykh (yellow card) 48'; Pavlovets (yellow card) 49' (goal) 71'	Report	Agalarov 11' (yellow card) 19' (yellow-red card) 75'; Ilyin 39' (pen.); Yakuyev (yellow card) 88'	Stadium: Gazovik Stadium; Attendance: 2,032; Referee: Vitali Meshkov

23 November 2022 5	Akhmat Grozny	2 – 1	Dynamo Moscow	Grozny
16:00 MSK (UTC+3)	Konaté 17'; Sadulayev 42' (pen.); Utsiyev (yellow card) 50'	Report	Zakharyan (yellow card) 40'; Kutitsky 57'; Sazonov (yellow card) 85'	Stadium: Akhmat-Arena; Attendance: 7,140; Referee: Kirill Levnikov

27 November 2022 6	Rostov	3 – 0	Akhmat Grozny	Rostov-on-Don
14:00 MSK (UTC+3)	Osipenko (yellow card) 5'; Langovich 17' (yellow card) 63'; Glebov (yellow card) 32'; Komlichenko 42' (yellow card) 44'; Golenkov 86'	Report	Kharin (yellow card) 49'; Semyonov (yellow card) 62'; Timofeyev (yellow card) 72'; Utsiyev (yellow card) 90'	Stadium: Rostov Arena; Attendance: 10,650; Referee: Roman Safyan

==== Knockout stage ====
26 February 2023 Regions path Quarter-finals Stage 1	Ufa	1 – 2	Akhmat Grozny	Ufa
14:30 MSK (UTC+3)	Sukhov (yellow card) 4'; Nikitin (yellow card) 40'; Ortiz 67' (pen.) (yellow card) 90'	Report	Sadulayev (yellow card) 5' (goal) 45'; Agalarov 37' (yellow card) 90+3'; Semyonov (yellow card) 52'; Kamilov (yellow card) 84'	Stadium: Neftyanik Stadium; Attendance: 3,825; Referee: Pavel Shadykhanov

15 March 2023 Regions path Quarter-finals Stage 2	Akhmat Grozny	0 – 3	Krasnodar	Grozny
15:00 MSK (UTC+3)	Shvets (yellow card) 36'; Timofeyev (red card) 39'	Report	Cobnan 27'; Krivtsov 60', 90+3'; Chernikov (yellow card) 86'	Stadium: Akhmat Arena; Attendance: 6,700; Referee: Sergey Ivanov

== Squad statistics ==
As of match played 3 June 2023

=== Appearances and goals ===
No.	Pos	Nat	Player	Total		Premier League		Russian Cup	
No.	Pos	Nat	Player	Apps	Goals	Apps	Goals	Apps	Goals
1	GK	(Russia) RUS	Mikhail Oparin	5	0	1+1	0	3	0
4	DF	(Bosnia and Herzegovina) BIH	Darko Todorović	15	1	12+2	1	1	0
5	DF	(Bosnia and Herzegovina) BIH	Miloš Šatara	8	0	6	0	2	0
7	MF	(Kosovo) KOS	Bernard Berisha	27	5	16+4	5	5+2	0
8	DF	(Serbia) SRB	Miroslav Bogosavac	29	0	24+1	0	3+1	0
11	MF	(Russia) RUS	Lechi Sadulayev	28	5	21+1	2	5+1	3
13	FW	(Burkina Faso) BFA	Mohamed Konaté	28	13	17+7	11	3+1	2
15	DF	(Russia) RUS	Andrei Semyonov	24	0	18+1	0	5	0
17	MF	(Russia) RUS	Vladislav Karapuzov	23	2	8+10	2	2+3	0
18	MF	(Russia) RUS	Vladislav Kamilov	25	2	13+7	2	4+1	0
20	DF	(Croatia) CRO	Zoran Nižić	12	0	7+4	0	1	0
21	MF	(Russia) RUS	Ivan Oleynikov	31	5	16+8	2	6+1	3
23	MF	(Russia) RUS	Anton Shvets	33	2	24+3	2	5+1	0
24	MF	(Montenegro) MNE	Zaim Divanović	6	0	2+3	0	1	0
25	MF	(Russia) RUS	Aleksandr Troshechkin	25	2	11+8	2	5+1	0
29	FW	(Russia) RUS	Vladimir Ilyin	34	6	8+19	4	4+3	2
33	MF	(Russia) RUS	Minkail Matsuyev	1	0	0+1	0	0	0
35	GK	(Russia) RUS	Rizvan Tashayev	1	0	0+1	0	0	0
40	DF	(Russia) RUS	Rizvan Utsiyev	21	0	13+3	0	5	0
47	FW	(Ivory Coast) CIV	Néné Gbamblé	5	1	3+2	1	0	0
59	DF	(Russia) RUS	Yevgeni Kharin	32	5	19+7	5	5+1	0
71	MF	(Russia) RUS	Magomed Yakuyev	3	0	0+2	0	0+1	0
77	FW	(Russia) RUS	Gamid Agalarov	29	5	8+14	3	4+3	2
79	DF	(Russia) RUS	Turpal-Ali Ibishev	1	0	0	0	0+1	0
88	GK	(Russia) RUS	Giorgi Sheliya	34	0	29	0	5	0
90	FW	(Russia) RUS	Islam Alsultanov	1	0	0+1	0	0	0
92	MF	(Russia) RUS	Abubakar Inalkayev	3	0	0	0	1+2	0
94	MF	(Russia) RUS	Artyom Timofeyev	31	8	25+1	8	4+1	0
96	DF	(Kazakhstan) KAZ	Marat Bystrov	24	0	19+1	0	1+3	0
99	FW	(Belarus) BLR	Ilya Chernyak	3	0	0+2	0	0+1	0
Players away from the club on loan:
Players who appeared for Akhmat Grozny but left during the season:
10	FW	(Russia) RUS	Khalid Kadyrov	1	0	0	0	0+1	0
19	MF	(Russia) RUS	Kirill Folmer	7	1	0+3	0	4	1
44	MF	(Russia) RUS	Yuri Zhuravlyov	17	1	10+2	1	4+1	0
95	FW	(Russia) RUS	Abubakar Kadyrov	1	0	0	0	0+1	0

=== Goal scorers ===
Place	Position	Nation	Number	Name	Premier League	Russian Cup	Total
1	FW	(Burkina Faso)	13	Mohamed Konaté	11	2	13
2	MF	(Russia)	94	Artyom Timofeyev	8	0	8
3	FW	(Russia)	29	Vladimir Ilyin	4	2	6
4	MF	(Kosovo)	7	Bernard Berisha	5	0	5
4	DF	(Russia)	59	Yevgeni Kharin	5	0	5
4	FW	(Russia)	9	Gamid Agalarov	3	2	5
4	MF	(Russia)	11	Lechi Sadulayev	2	3	5
4	MF	(Russia)	21	Ivan Oleynikov	2	3	5
9	MF	(Russia)	17	Vladislav Karapuzov	2	0	2
9	MF	(Russia)	18	Vladislav Kamilov	2	0	2
9	MF	(Russia)	23	Anton Shvets	2	0	2
9	MF	(Russia)	25	Aleksandr Troshechkin	2	0	2
13	DF	(Bosnia and Herzegovina)	4	Darko Todorović	1	0	1
13	DF	(Russia)	44	Yuri Zhuravlyov	1	0	1
13	FW	(Ivory Coast)	47	Néné Gbamblé	1	0	1
13	MF	(Russia)	19	Kirill Folmer	0	1	1
Total					51	13	64

=== Clean sheets ===
Place	Position	Nation	Number	Name	Premier League	Russian Cup	Total
1	GK	(Russia)	88	Giorgi Sheliya	8	0	8
Total					8	0	8

=== Disciplinary record ===
Number	Nation	Position	Name	Premier League		Russian Cup		Total	
Number	Nation	Position	Name	Booked	Sent off (straight red)	Booked	Sent off (straight red)	Booked	Sent off (straight red)
1	(Russia)	GK	Mikhail Oparin	0	1	0	0	0	1
4	(Bosnia and Herzegovina)	DF	Darko Todorović	4	0	0	0	4	0
7	(Kosovo)	MF	Bernard Berisha	6	0	0	0	6	0
8	(Serbia)	DF	Miroslav Bogosavac	1	0	0	0	1	0
11	(Russia)	MF	Lechi Sadulayev	6	1	1	0	7	1
13	(Burkina Faso)	FW	Mohamed Konaté	4	1	0	0	4	1
15	(Russia)	DF	Andrei Semyonov	5	0	2	0	7	0
17	(Russia)	MF	Vladislav Karapuzov	7	0	1	0	8	0
18	(Russia)	MF	Vladislav Kamilov	5	0	1	0	6	0
20	(Croatia)	DF	Zoran Nižić	2	0	0	0	2	0
21	(Russia)	MF	Ivan Oleynikov	2	0	0	0	2	0
23	(Russia)	MF	Anton Shvets	11	0	3	0	14	0
25	(Russia)	MF	Aleksandr Troshechkin	3	0	1	0	4	0
29	(Russia)	FW	Vladimir Ilyin	2	0	0	0	2	0
40	(Russia)	DF	Rizvan Utsiyev	0	0	2	0	0	0
59	(Russia)	DF	Yevgeni Kharin	3	0	1	0	4	0
71	(Russia)	MF	Magomed Yakuyev	1	0	1	0	1	0
77	(Russia)	FW	Gamid Agalarov	3	0	3	1	6	1
88	(Russia)	GK	Giorgi Sheliya	4	0	0	0	4	0
90	(Russia)	FW	Islam Alsultanov	1	0	0	0	1	0
94	(Russia)	MF	Artyom Timofeyev	7	1	1	1	8	2
96	(Kazakhstan)	DF	Marat Bystrov	3	0	1	0	4	0
Players away on loan:
Players who left Akhmat Grozny during the season:
10	(Russia)	FW	Khalid Kadyrov	0	0	1	0	0	0
19	(Russia)	MF	Kirill Folmer	1	0	0	0	1	0
Total				81	4	19	1	100	5
