= Darko Todorović =

Bosnian footballer (born 1997)

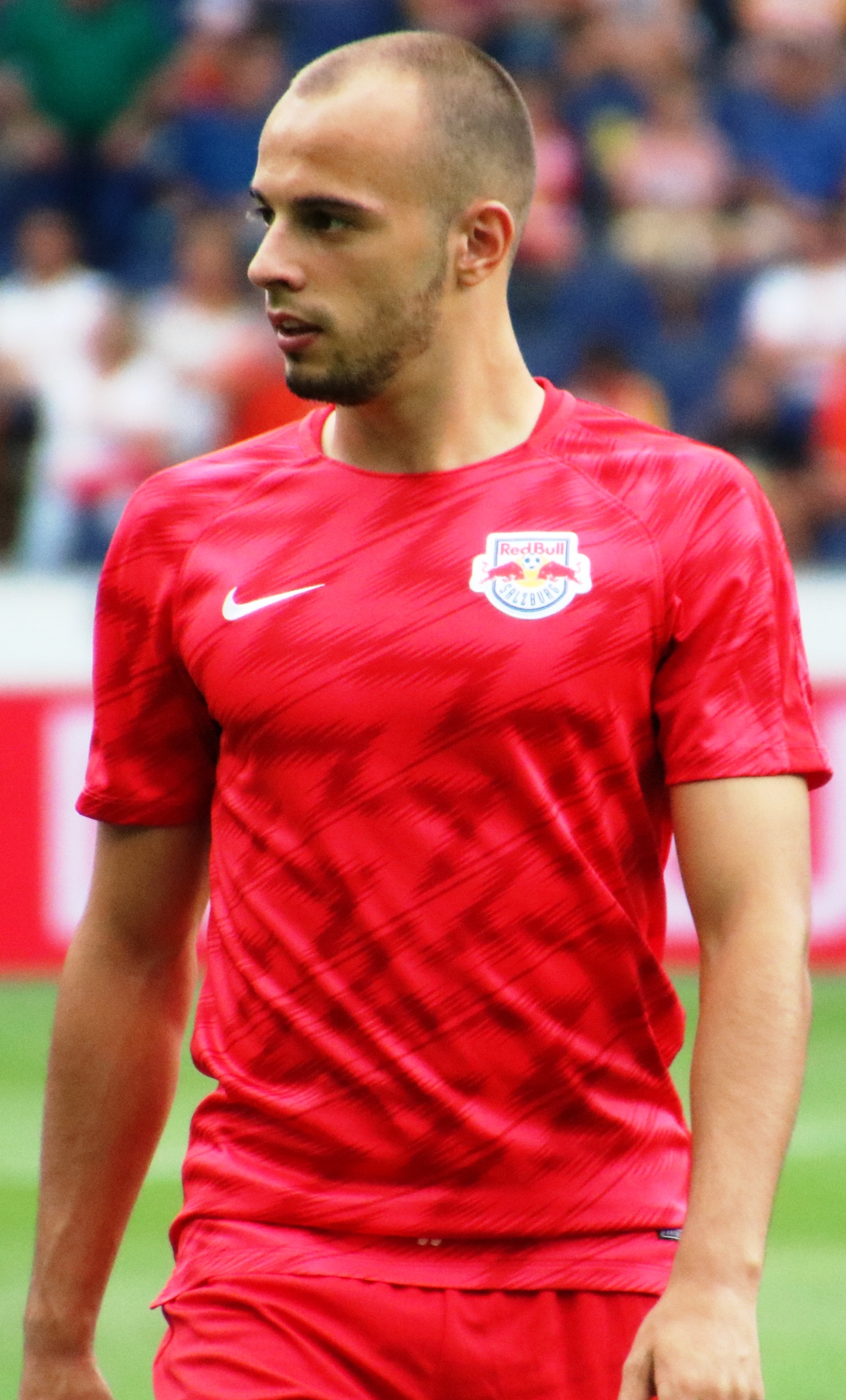
- Todorović with Red Bull Salzburg in 2018

Personal information
- Date of birth: 5 May 1997 (age 29)
- Place of birth: Bijeljina, Bosnia and Herzegovina
- Height: 1.75 m (5 ft 9 in)
- Position: Right-back

Team information
- Current team: Fakel Voronezh
- Number: 55

Youth career
- Klub 7
- Sloboda Tuzla

Senior career*
Years	Team	Apps	(Gls)
2015–2018	Sloboda Tuzla	48	(3)
2018–2022	Red Bull Salzburg	12	(0)
2019–2020	→ Holstein Kiel (loan)	9	(0)
2020–2021	→ Hajduk Split (loan)	26	(0)
2021–2022	→ Akhmat Grozny (loan)	17	(0)
2022–2026	Akhmat Grozny	75	(2)
2026–	Fakel Voronezh	25	(1)

International career
2013–2014	Bosnia and Herzegovina U17	11	(0)
2014–2015	Bosnia and Herzegovina U19	5	(0)
2017–2018	Bosnia and Herzegovina U21	7	(1)
2018–2021	Bosnia and Herzegovina	16	(0)
- * Club domestic league appearances and goals as of 7 November 2026

Darko Todorović (pronounced [dâːrko todôːroʋitɕ]; born 5 May 1997) is a Bosnian professional footballer who plays as a right-back for Russian Premier League club Fakel Voronezh.

Todorović started his professional career at Sloboda Tuzla, before joining Red Bull Salzburg in 2018. He was loaned to Holstein Kiel in 2019, to Hajduk Split in 2020 and to Akhmat Grozny in 2021, with whom he signed permanently a year later. In 2026, he moved to Fakel Voronezh.

A former youth international for Bosnia and Herzegovina, Todorović made his senior international debut in 2018, earning 16 caps until 2021.

== Club career ==
=== Early career ===
Todorović started playing football at a local club, before joining Sloboda Tuzla's youth academy. He made his professional debut against Zrinjski Mostar on 11 April 2015 at the age of 17. On 21 September 2016, he scored his first professional goal against Podrinje Janja, which sent his team through in their cup tie.

=== Red Bull Salzburg ===
In July 2018, Todorović was transferred to Austrian outfit Red Bull Salzburg for an undisclosed fee. He made his official debut for the squad in an Austrian Cup game against ASKÖ Oedt on 22 July. Three weeks later, he made his league debut against Austria Wien. He won his first trophy with the club on 1 May 2019, by beating Rapid Wien in the Austrian Cup final.

In July, Todorović was loaned to German side Holstein Kiel until the end of the season.

In August 2020, he was sent on a season-long loan to Croatian outfit Hajduk Split.

=== Later stage of career ===
In September 2021, Todorović was loaned to Russian team Akhmat Grozny for the remainder of the campaign, with an option to make the transfer permanent, which was activated the following year.

In February 2026, he switched to Fakel Voronezh.

== International career ==
Todorović represented Bosnia and Herzegovina at all youth levels.

In January 2018, he received his first senior call up, for friendly games against the United States and Mexico. He debuted against the former on 28 January.

== Career statistics ==
=== Club ===
As of match played 7 November 2026

Appearances and goals by club, season and competition
Club	Season	League			National cup (Note: Includes Bosnian Cup, Austrian Cup, Croatian Cup, Russian Cup)		Continental		Other		Total	
Club	Season	Division	Apps	Goals	Apps	Goals	Apps	Goals	Apps	Goals	Apps	Goals
Sloboda Tuzla	2014–15	Bosnian Premier League	1	0	–		–		–		1	0
Sloboda Tuzla	2015–16	Bosnian Premier League	2	0	0	0	–		–		2	0
Sloboda Tuzla	2016–17	Bosnian Premier League	16	1	3	1	0	0	–		19	2
Sloboda Tuzla	2017–18	Bosnian Premier League	29	2	6	0	–		–		35	2
Sloboda Tuzla	Total		48	3	9	1	0	0	–		57	4
Red Bull Salzburg	2018–19	Austrian Bundesliga	12	0	2	0	0	0	–		14	0
Holstein Kiel (loan)	2019–20	2. Bundesliga	9	0	0	0	–		–		9	0
Hajduk Split (loan)	2020–21	Croatian Football League	26	0	2	0	1 (Note: Appearance in UEFA Europa League)	0	–		29	0
Akhmat Grozny (loan)	2021–22	Russian Premier League	17	0	1	0	–		–		18	0
Akhmat Grozny	2022–23	Russian Premier League	14	1	1	0	–		–		15	1
Akhmat Grozny	2023–24	Russian Premier League	28	1	7	0	–		–		35	1
Akhmat Grozny	2024–25	Russian Premier League	27	0	5	0	–		2 (Note: Appearances in Russian Premier League relegation play-offs)	0	34	0
Akhmat Grozny	2025–26	Russian Premier League	6	0	6	0	–		–		12	0
Akhmat Grozny	Total		92	2	20	0	–		2	0	114	2
Fakel Voronezh	2025–26	Russian First League	12	1	–		–		–		12	1
Fakel Voronezh	2026–27	Russian Premier League	13	0	5	0	–		–		18	0
Fakel Voronezh	Total		25	1	5	0	–		–		30	1
Career total			212	6	38	1	1	0	2	0	253	7

=== International ===
Appearances and goals by national team and year
National team	Year	Apps	Goals
Bosnia and Herzegovina
Bosnia and Herzegovina	2018	6	0
Bosnia and Herzegovina	2019	4	0
Bosnia and Herzegovina	2020	3	0
Bosnia and Herzegovina	2021	3	0
Total		16	0

== Honours ==
Red Bull Salzburg

- Austrian Bundesliga: 2018–19
- Austrian Cup: 2018–19
