= Fyodor Kudryashov =

Russian footballer (born 1987)

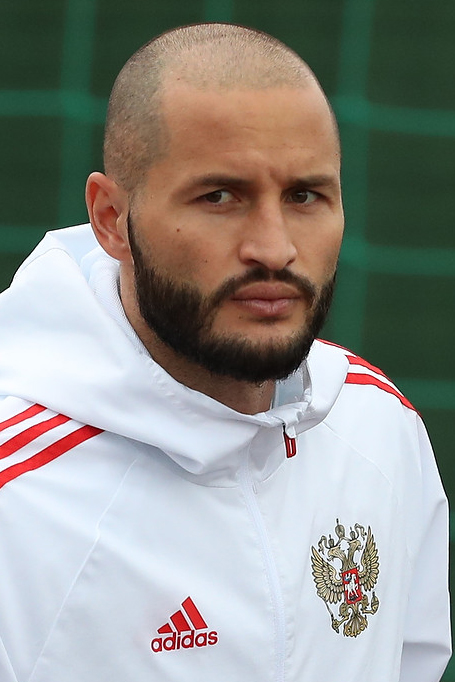
- Kudryashov with Russia in 2018

Personal information
- Full name: Fyodor Vasilievich Kudryashov
- Date of birth: 5 April 1987 (age 39)
- Place of birth: Mamakan, Russian SFSR, Soviet Union
- Height: 1.81 m (5 ft 11 in)
- Position: Left back

Youth career
- 1997–2002: Sibiryak Bratsk

Senior career*
Years	Team	Apps	(Gls)
2003–2004	Sibiryak Bratsk	17	(1)
2005–2012	Spartak Moscow	36	(0)
2008	→ Khimki (loan)	16	(0)
2010	→ Tom Tomsk (loan)	10	(0)
2011	→ Krasnodar (loan)	9	(0)
2012–2016	Terek Grozny	70	(0)
2016–2017	Rostov	35	(1)
2017–2018	Rubin Kazan	35	(0)
2019	İstanbul Başakşehir	8	(1)
2019–2020	PFC Sochi	16	(1)
2020–2023	Antalyaspor	96	(1)
2023	Fakel Voronezh	10	(0)

International career
2007–2008	Russia U21	10	(0)
2016–2021	Russia	48	(1)
- * Club domestic league appearances and goals

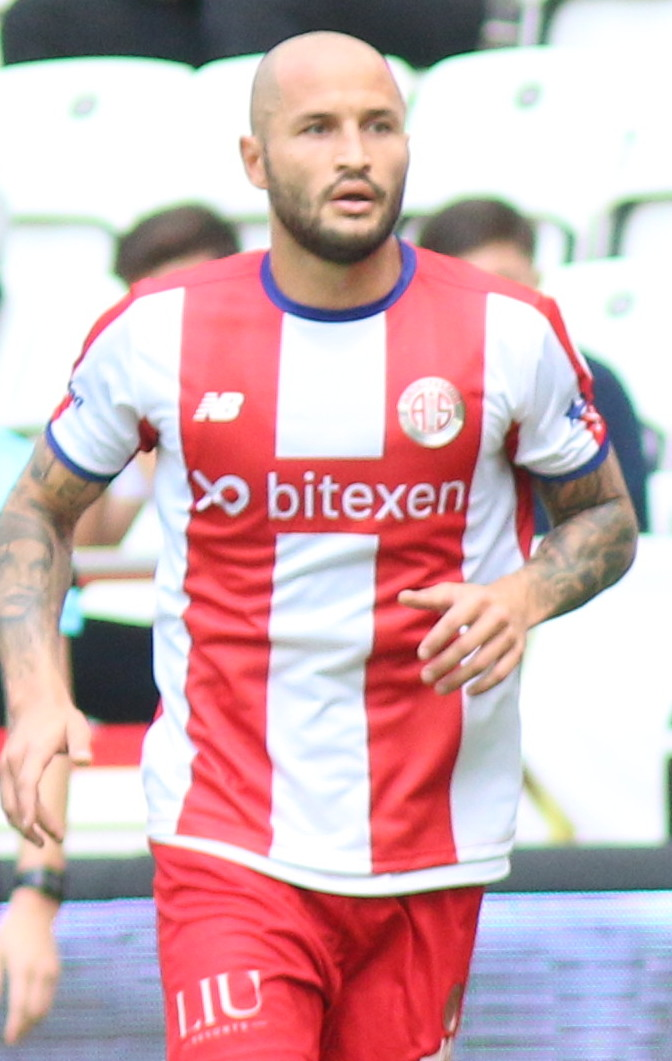
Kudryashov with Antalyaspor in 2021

Fyodor Vasilievich Kudryashov (Russian: Фёдор Васильевич Кудряшов, IPA: [ˈfʲɵdər vɐˈsʲilʲjɪvʲɪtɕ kʊdrʲɪˈʂof]; born 5 April 1987) is a Russian former professional footballer who played as a left back. He could also play as a centre back.

== Club career ==
Born in Irkutsk Oblast, Kudryashov came in from FC Sibiryak, Bratsk. In 2004 while playing for the Siberia selection, he was noticed by Sergey Shavlo, who was Spartak Moscow scout at that time. After playing for Spartak reserves, he had his debut during the last match of the 2006 season. In the new season Kudryashov unexpectedly became a first team regular after Clemente Rodríguez was loaned out.

In 2008, Kudryashov played for FC Khimki on loan from July to December. In August 2010, he was loaned to FC Tom Tomsk. He was also loaned to FC Krasnodar from FC Spartak Moscow.

On 1 February 2012, he missed a penalty in a penalty shootout against the Norwegian team Rosenborg BK, the penalty shootout ended 10-9 with FC Spartak Moscow losing. This was their second match in the friendly Cup del Sol tournament.

On 8 August 2012, he completed a permanent transfer to FC Akhmat Grozny.

On 15 January 2016, Rostov signed him from FC Akhmat Grozny for 2 million euros, signing a 3-years deal. In July 2017, he moved on to Rubin Kazan.

In 2018, he filed a lawsuit against FC Rostov at the RFU Dispute Resolution Chamber, claiming that FC Rostov still owes him around €200,000 in wages and bonuses.

On 10 January 2019, he was released from his contract with FC Rubin Kazan.

On 31 January 2019, he signed a 1.5-year contract with the Turkish club İstanbul Başakşehir. He left the club on 20 June 2019.

On 12 July 2019, he signed with PFC Sochi. On 18 December 2019, his contract with Sochi was dissolved by mutual consent.

On 6 January 2020, he signed a 1.5-year contract with the Turkish club Antalyaspor. On 22 July 2021, he extended his contract for the Turkish club. He left the club on 1 July 2023 at the end of his contract.

On 5 July 2023, Russian Premier League side FC Fakel Voronezh announced the signing of Kudryashov.

Kudryashov retired from playing on 8 February 2024.

== International career ==
He was called up to the senior Russia squad in August 2016 for matches against Turkey and Ghana. He made his debut against Turkey on 31 August 2016.

On 11 May 2018, he was included in Russia's extended 2018 FIFA World Cup squad. On 3 June 2018, he was included in the finalized World Cup squad. After coming on as a substitute in the second group game against Egypt, he started in Russia's last three games at the tournament - the last group game against Uruguay, the round of 16 defeat of Spain and the quarterfinal shoot-out loss to Croatia.

On 11 May 2021, he was included in the preliminary extended 30-man squad for UEFA Euro 2020. On 2 June 2021, he was included in the final squad. He missed Russia's first two group stage games due to injury before starting on 21 June in the last group game against Denmark as Russia lost 1–4 and was eliminated, with Kudryashov substituted halfway through the second half.

== Career statistics ==
=== Club ===
As of match played 10 December 2023

Club	Season	League			National cup (Note: Includes Russian Cup, Turkish Cup)		Europe		Other		Total	
Club	Season	Division	Apps	Goals	Apps	Goals	Apps	Goals	Apps	Goals	Apps	Goals
FC Sibiryak Bratsk	2003	Russian Professional Football League	3	0	0	0	–		–		3	0
FC Sibiryak Bratsk	2004	Russian Professional Football League	14	1	1	0	–		–		15	1
FC Sibiryak Bratsk	Total		17	1	1	0	–		–		18	1
FC Spartak Moscow	2005	Russian Premier League	0	0	1	0	–		–		1	0
FC Spartak Moscow	2006	Russian Premier League	1	0	0	0	0	0	–		1	0
FC Spartak Moscow	2007	Russian Premier League	7	0	2	0	2	0	–		11	0
FC Spartak Moscow	2008	Russian Premier League	1	0	0	0	2 (Note: Appearances in UEFA Cup)	0	–		3	0
FC Spartak Moscow	2009	Russian Premier League	7	0	0	0	–		–		7	0
FC Spartak Moscow	2010	Russian Premier League	9	0	0	0	0	0	–		9	0
FC Spartak Moscow	2011–12	Russian Premier League	11	0	3	0	0	0	–		14	0
FC Spartak Moscow	Total		36	0	6	0	4	0	–		46	0
FC Khimki (loan)	2008	Russian Premier League	16	0	1	0	–		–		17	0
FC Tom Tomsk (loan)	2010	Russian Premier League	10	0	0	0	–		–		10	0
FC Krasnodar (loan)	2011–12	Russian Premier League	9	0	0	0	–		–		9	0
FC Terek Grozny	2012–13	Russian Premier League	15	0	2	0	–		–		17	0
FC Terek Grozny	2013–14	Russian Premier League	15	0	2	0	–		–		17	0
FC Terek Grozny	2014–15	Russian Premier League	27	0	0	0	–		–		27	0
FC Terek Grozny	2015–16	Russian Premier League	13	0	2	0	–		–		15	0
FC Terek Grozny	Total		70	0	6	0	–		–		76	0
FC Rostov	2015–16	Russian Premier League	11	1	–		–		–		11	1
FC Rostov	2016–17	Russian Premier League	24	0	0	0	12 (Note: Eight appearances in UEFA Champions League, four appearances in UEFA Europa League)	0	–		36	0
FC Rostov	Total		35	1	0	0	12	0	–		47	1
Rubin Kazan	2017–18	Russian Premier League	26	0	2	0	–		–		28	0
Rubin Kazan	2018–19	Russian Premier League	9	0	1	0	–		–		10	0
Rubin Kazan	Total		35	0	3	0	–		–		38	0
İstanbul Başakşehir	2018–19	Süper Lig	8	1	–		–		–		8	1
PFC Sochi	2019–20	Russian Premier League	16	1	0	0	–		–		16	1
Antalyaspor	2019–20	Süper Lig	17	0	3	0	–		–		20	0
Antalyaspor	2020–21	Süper Lig	37	0	5	0	–		–		42	0
Antalyaspor	2021–22	Süper Lig	29	1	3	0	–		1 (Note: Appearance in Turkish Super Cup)	0	33	1
Antalyaspor	2022–23	Süper Lig	13	0	2	0	–		–		15	0
Antalyaspor	Total		96	1	13	0	–		1	0	110	1
Fakel	2023–24	Russian Premier League	10	0	4	0	–		–		14	0
Career total			358	5	34	0	16	0	1	0	409	5

=== International ===
As of match played 6 September 2020

Russia
Year	Apps	Goals
2016	4	0
2017	11	0
2018	11	0
2019	9	1
2020	1	0
Total	36	1

International goals

As of 8 June 2019 (Russia score listed first, score column indicates score after each Kudryashov goal)

No.	Date	Venue	Opponent	Score	Result	Competition
1.	8 June 2019	Mordovia Arena, Saransk, Russia	San Marino	3–0	9–0	UEFA Euro 2020 qualification
