= Facundo Píriz =

Uruguayan footballer (born 1990)

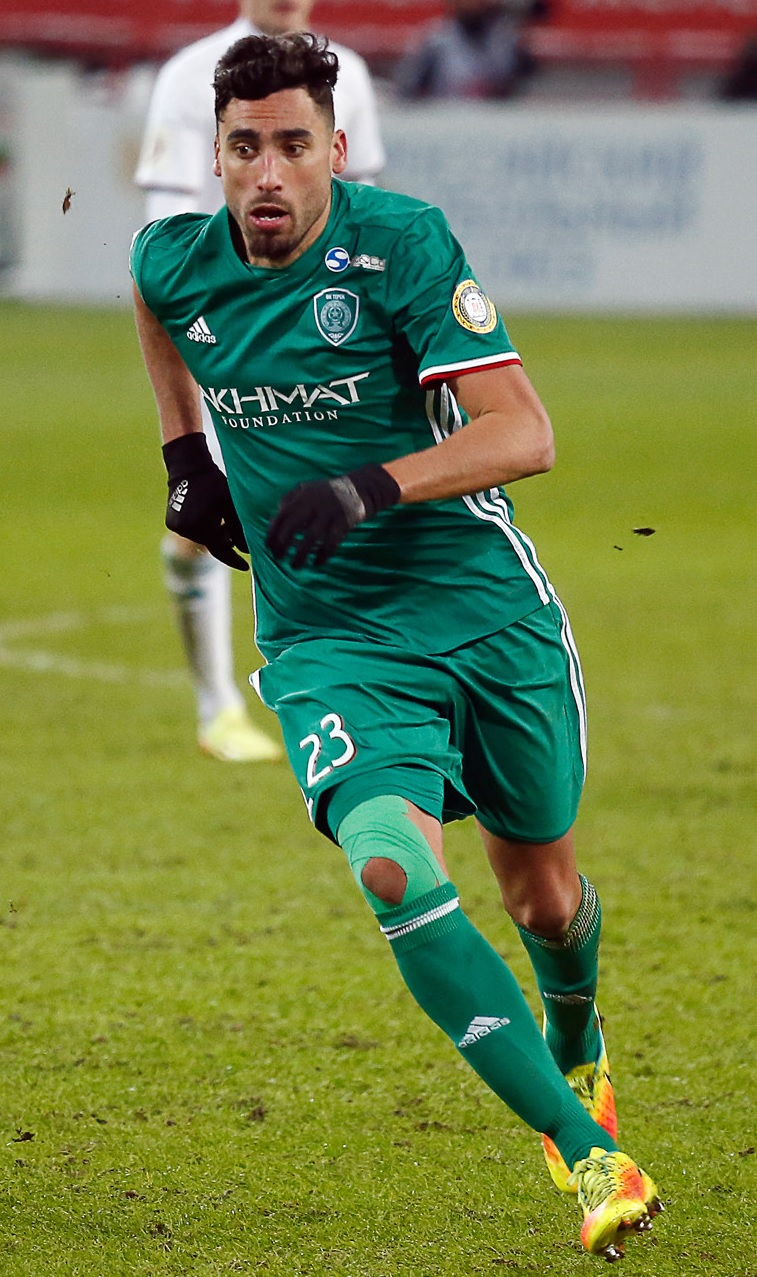
- Píriz with Terek Grozny in 2016

Personal information
- Full name: Facundo Julián Píriz González
- Date of birth: 27 March 1990 (age 36)
- Place of birth: Tarariras, Uruguay
- Height: 1.86 m (6 ft 1 in)
- Position: Defensive midfielder

Team information
- Current team: Deportivo Maldonado

Senior career*
Years	Team	Apps	(Gls)
2008–2012	Nacional	60	(2)
2013–2018	Akhmat Grozny	69	(3)
2017–2018	→ Montpellier (loan)	15	(0)
2017–2018	→ Montpellier B (loan)	1	(0)
2018–2019	Montpellier	6	(0)
2018–2019	→ Montpellier B	5	(0)
2019–2020	Rapid București	6	(0)
2020	Club Plaza	20	(2)
2021	Nacional	12	(0)
2022–	Deportivo Maldonado	0	(0)

International career
2008–2009	Uruguay U-20	3	(0)
2011	Uruguay U-22	5	(1)
- * Club domestic league appearances and goals as of 18:02, 23 January 2022 (UTC)

Facundo Julián Píriz González (Note: In this Spanish name, the first or paternal surname is Píriz and the second or maternal family name is González.) (born 27 March 1990), commonly known as Facundo Píriz (Latin American Spanish: [faˈkundo ˈpiɾis]), is a Uruguayan professional footballer who plays as a defensive midfielder for Deportivo Maldonado.

== Career ==
Born in Tarariras, Uruguay, Píriz started his career with Nacional.

In January 2013 he signed a 4.5-year contract with Terek Grozny, of the Russian Premier League, from Nacional for €2.8 million.

On 28 July 2017, he signed with the French club Montpellier on a one-year loan deal with option to purchase. Montpellier officially exercised the purchase option on 18 April 2018.

On 25 September 2019, he signed a one-year contract with Romanian club Rapid București.

== International career ==
Píriz was part of Uruguay's under-20 squad in the 2009 South American Youth Championship.

He also played in Uruguay's under-22 squad at the 2011 Pan American Games.

== Career statistics ==
=== Club ===
As of match played 1 July 2019

Appearances and goals by club, season and competition
Club	Season	League			Cup		League Cup		Continental		Other		Total	
Club	Season	Division	Apps	Goals	Apps	Goals	Apps	Goals	Apps	Goals	Apps	Goals	Apps	Goals
Nacional	2009–10	Uruguayan Primera División	1	0	—		—		—		—		1	0
Nacional	2010–11	Uruguayan Primera División	21	1	—		—		—		—		21	1
Nacional	2011–12	Uruguayan Primera División	28	1	—		—		11	0	—		34	1
Nacional	2012–13	Uruguayan Primera División	10	0	—		—		3	0	—		13	0
Nacional	Total		60	2	0	0	-	-	14	0	0	0	74	2
Terek Grozny	2012–13	Russian Premier League	6	1	0	0	—		—		—		6	1
Terek Grozny	2013–14	Russian Premier League	15	0	1	0	—		—		—		16	0
Terek Grozny	2014–15	Russian Premier League	11	0	1	0	—		—		—		12	0
Terek Grozny	2015–16	Russian Premier League	11	1	3	0	—		—		—		14	1
Terek Grozny	2016–17	Russian Premier League	26	1	2	0	—		—		—		28	1
Terek Grozny	Total		69	3	7	0	-	-	-	-	-	-	76	3
Montpellier (loan)	2017–2018	Ligue 1	15	0	1	0	4	0	—		—		20	0
Montpellier II (loan)	2017–2018	Championnat National 3	1	0	—		—		—		—		1	0
Montpellier	2018–2019	Ligue 1	6	0	0	0	1	0	—		—		7	0
Montpellier	2019–2020	Ligue 1	0	0	0	0	0	0	—		—		0	0
Montpellier	Total		6	0	0	0	1	0	-	-	-	-	7	0
Montpellier II	2018–2019	Championnat National 3	4	0	—		—		—		—		4	0
Montpellier II	2019–2020	Championnat National 3	1	0	—		—		—		—		1	0
Montpellier II	Total		5	0	-	-	-	-	-	-	-	-	5	0
Rapid București	2019–20	Liga I	6	0	0	0	—		—		—		6	0
Club Plaza	2020	Uruguayan Primera División	20	2	0	0	—		2	0	—		20	2
Nacional	2021	Uruguayan Primera División	1	0	0	0	—		4	0	—		5	0
Career total			183	7	8	0	5	0	20	0	0	0	211	7

== Honours ==
Nacional

- Uruguayan League: 2008–09, 2010–11, 2011–12
