= Khalid Kadyrov =

Russian footballer

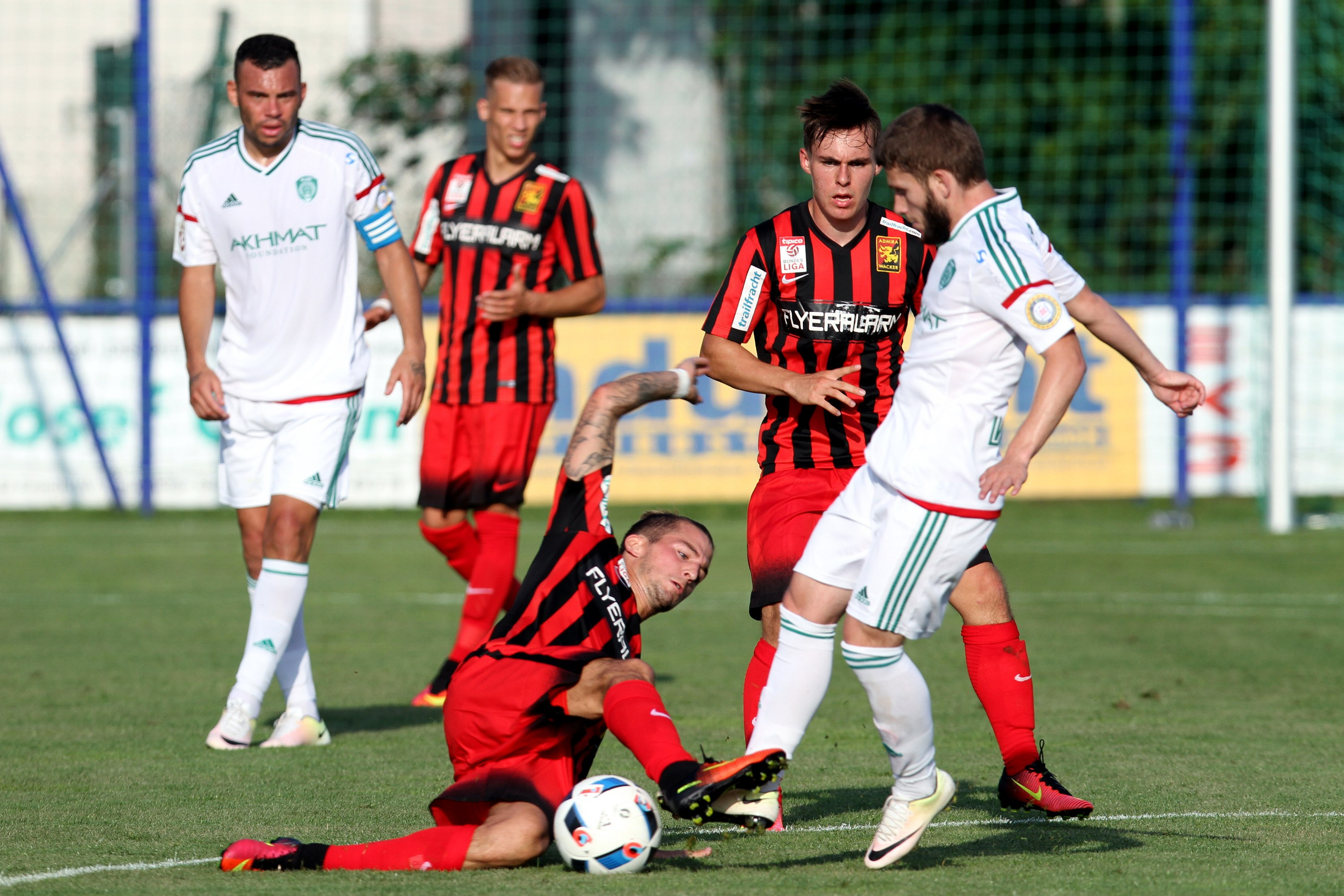
- Khalid Kadyrov (FC Terek Grozny) far right

Personal information
- Full name: Khalid Khozh-Baudiyevich Kadyrov
- Date of birth: 19 April 1994 (age 32)
- Place of birth: Oyskhara, Russia
- Height: 1.67 m (5 ft 6 in)
- Positions: Forward; midfielder

Senior career*
Years	Team	Apps	(Gls)
2010–2022	Akhmat Grozny	21	(0)

International career
2015	Russia U21	1	(0)
- * Club domestic league appearances and goals

Khalid Khozh-Baudiyevich Kadyrov (Chechen: Къадири Хьалид, Russian: Халид Хож-Баудиевич Кадыров; born 19 April 1994) is a Russian former footballer who played as a left winger.

== Career ==
Kadyrov made his professional debut for FC Terek Grozny on 13 July 2010 in the Russian Cup game against FC Luch-Energiya Vladivostok.

Kadyrov made his Russian Premier League debut for FC Terek Grozny on 6 May 2012 in a game against FC Amkar Perm. He retired on 27 October 2022.

== Career statistics ==
=== Club ===
As of match played 23 October 2022

Club	Season	League			Cup		Continental		Total	
Club	Season	Division	Apps	Goals	Apps	Goals	Apps	Goals	Apps	Goals
Akhmat Grozny	2010	Russian Premier League	0	0	1	0	–		1	0
Akhmat Grozny	2011–12	Russian Premier League	1	0	0	0	–		1	0
Akhmat Grozny	2012–13	Russian Premier League	0	0	0	0	–		0	0
Akhmat Grozny	2013–14	Russian Premier League	2	0	0	0	–		2	0
Akhmat Grozny	2014–15	Russian Premier League	5	0	0	0	–		5	0
Akhmat Grozny	2015–16	Russian Premier League	4	0	1	1	–		5	1
Akhmat Grozny	2016–17	Russian Premier League	0	0	0	0	–		0	0
Akhmat Grozny	2017–18	Russian Premier League	2	0	0	0	–		2	0
Akhmat Grozny	2018–19	Russian Premier League	0	0	0	0	–		0	0
Akhmat Grozny	2019–20	Russian Premier League	1	0	1	0	–		2	0
Akhmat Grozny	2020–21	Russian Premier League	5	0	2	0	–		7	0
Akhmat Grozny	2021–22	Russian Premier League	1	0	0	0	–		1	0
Akhmat Grozny	2022–23	Russian Premier League	0	0	1	0	–		1	0
Akhmat Grozny	Total		21	0	6	1	0	0	27	1
Total			21	0	6	1	0	0	27	1

== Personal life ==
Kadyrov is a nephew of Chechen politician Ramzan Kadyrov.

He married Jamila Aydamirova on August 16, 2015.
