= Bad Erlach =

- Municipality
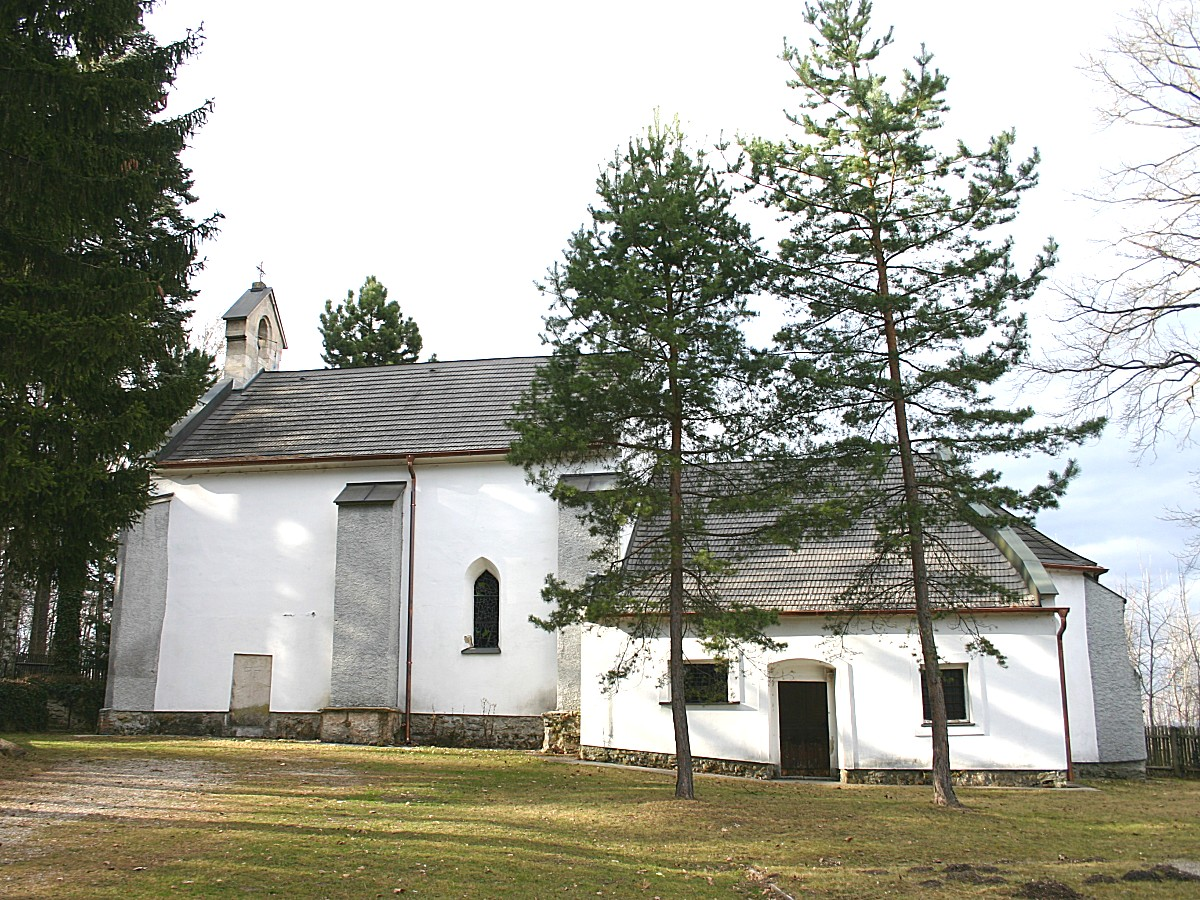
- Saint Ulrich Church

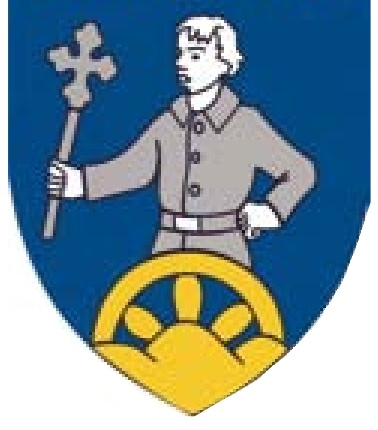
- Coat of arms

- Location within Austria
- Coordinates: 47°44′02″N 16°12′47″E
- Country: Austria
- State: Lower Austria
- District: Wiener Neustadt-Land

Government
  - Mayor: Bärbel Stockinger (ÖVP)

Area
  - Total: 9.16 km^{2} (3.54 sq mi)
- Elevation: 312 m (1,024 ft)

Population (2018-01-01)
  - Total: 3,084
  - Density: 337/km^{2} (872/sq mi)
- Time zone: UTC+1 (CET)
  - Summer (DST): UTC+2 (CEST)
- Postal code: 2822
- Area code: 02627
- Vehicle registration: WB
- Website: www.baderlach.gv.at

Bad Erlach is a municipality in the district of Wiener Neustadt-Land in the Austrian state of Lower Austria.

== Population ==
Historical population
Year	Pop.	±%
1869	1,388	—
1880	1,708	+23.1%
1890	1,698	−0.6%
1900	2,036	+19.9%
1910	2,241	+10.1%
1923	1,877	−16.2%
1934	2,054	+9.4%
1939	2,101	+2.3%
1951	2,141	+1.9%
1961	2,122	−0.9%
1971	2,218	+4.5%
1981	2,099	−5.4%
1991	2,184	+4.0%
2001	2,531	+15.9%
