= Adílson Warken =

Brazilian footballer (born 1987)

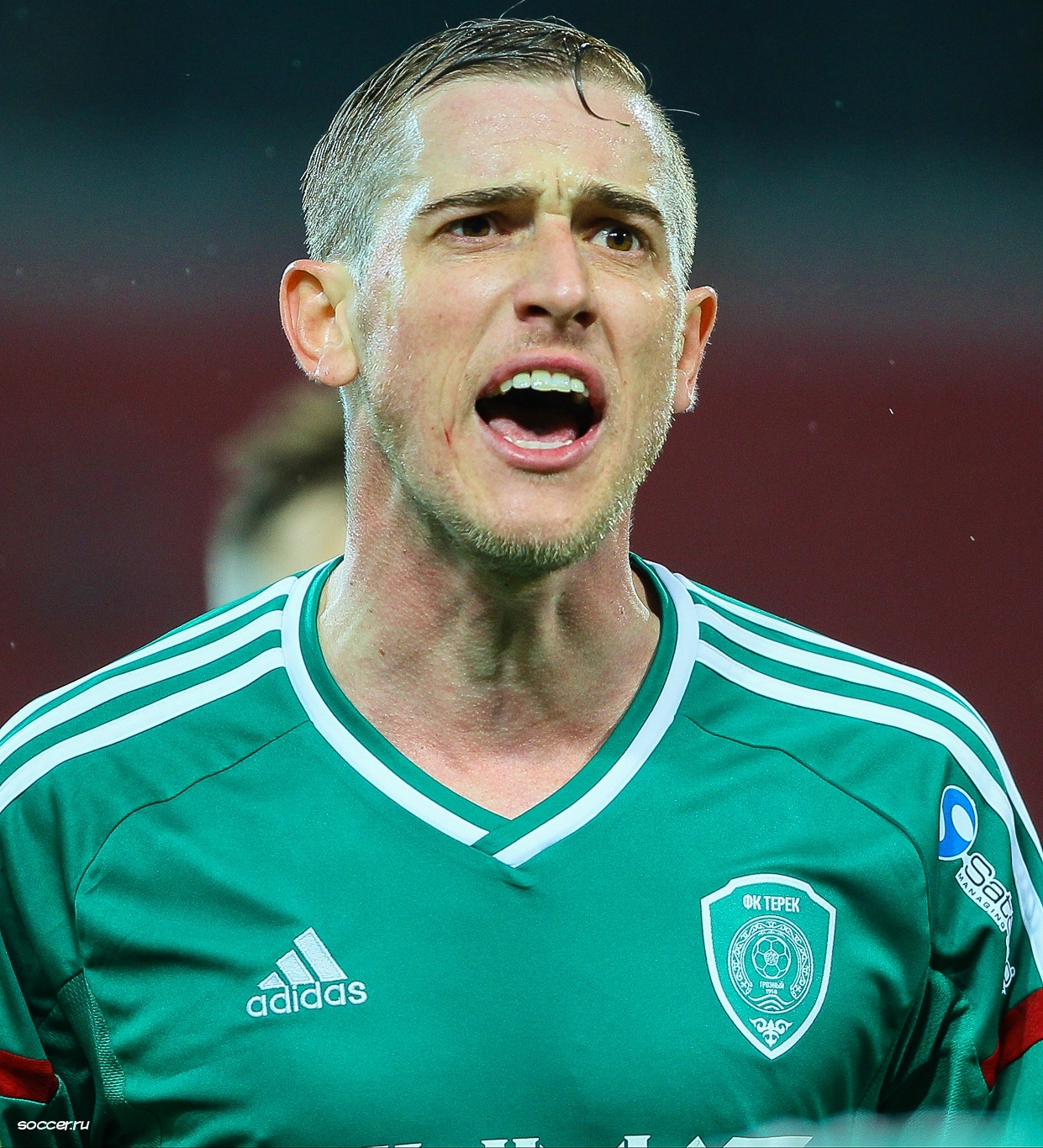
- Adílson with Terek Grozny in 2016

Personal information
- Date of birth: 16 January 1987 (age 39)
- Place of birth: Bom Princípio, Brazil
- Height: 1.81 m (5 ft 11 in)
- Position: Defensive midfielder

Youth career
- 2005: Caxias
- 2006–2007: Grêmio

Senior career*
Years	Team	Apps	(Gls)
2007–2011	Grêmio	138	(2)
2012–2017	Terek Grozny	101	(3)
2017–2019	Atlético Mineiro	72	(1)
Total		311	(6)

Managerial career
- 2019–2020: Atlético Mineiro (assistant)
- 2020: Coritiba (assistant)
- * Club domestic league appearances and goals

Adílson Warken (born 16 January 1987) is a Brazilian former professional footballer who played as a defensive midfielder.

== Career ==
=== Grêmio ===
Born in Bom Princípio, Rio Grande do Sul, Adílson started his career at Caxias in 2005, before joining the Grêmio youth setup in the following year. He was promoted to the senior squad in 2007 and amassed a total of 14 official appearances throughout his two first professional seasons. In 2009, Adílson made his breakthrough into the starting lineup, playing 34 matches in the 2009 Série A and starting in all 12 of Grêmio's semifinalist campaign at the 2009 Copa Libertadores. His first goal came in a Série A 4–2 victory over Barueri on 29 November 2009. In 2010, he won his second Campeonato Gaúcho trophy with Grêmio.

=== Terek Grozny ===
On 24 December 2011, Terek Grozny confirmed the signing of Adílson. In July 2016, Adílson underwent Pubic symphysis surgery, ruling him out of the start of the new season. After five years with Terek Grozny, making over 100 appearances for the club, Adílson's contract was terminated by mutual consent on 28 February 2017.

=== Atlético Mineiro ===
On 3 March 2017, Adílson joined Atlético Mineiro. In his first season, he won the 2017 Campeonato Mineiro.

On 12 July 2019, Adílson announced his retirement as a professional footballer after being diagnosed with hypertrophic cardiomyopathy.

== Career statistics ==
As of match played 12 July 2019

Appearances and goals by club, season and competition
Club	Season	League			State League		National Cup		Continental		Other		Total	
Club	Season	Division	Apps	Goals	Apps	Goals	Apps	Goals	Apps	Goals	Apps	Goals	Apps	Goals
Grêmio	2007	Brasileiro Série A	10	0	—		—		—		—		10	0
Grêmio	2008	Brasileiro Série A	3	0	—		1	0	—		—		4	0
Grêmio	2009	Brasileiro Série A	34	1	11	0	—		12	0	—		57	1
Grêmio	2010	Brasileiro Série A	28	0	14	0	8	0	1	0	—		51	0
Grêmio	2011	Brasileiro Série A	23	1	15	0	—		8	0	—		46	1
Grêmio	Total		98	2	40	0	9	0	21	0	—		168	2
Terek Grozny	2011–12	Russian Premier League	6	0	—		—		—		—		6	0
Terek Grozny	2012–13	Russian Premier League	24	1	—		3	0	—		—		27	1
Terek Grozny	2013–14	Russian Premier League	18	0	—		3	0	—		—		21	0
Terek Grozny	2014–15	Russian Premier League	24	0	—		—		—		—		24	0
Terek Grozny	2015–16	Russian Premier League	26	2	—		1	0	—		—		27	2
Terek Grozny	2016–17	Russian Premier League	3	0	—		—		—		—		3	0
Terek Grozny	Total		101	3	—		7	0	—		—		108	3
Atlético Mineiro	2017	Brasileiro Série A	25	0	4	0	2	0	4	0	2	0	37	0
Atlético Mineiro	2018	Brasileiro Série A	22	0	9	1	6	0	1	0	—		38	1
Atlético Mineiro	2019	Brasileiro Série A	5	0	7	0	1	0	9	0	—		22	0
Atlético Mineiro	Total		52	0	20	1	9	0	14	0	2	0	97	1
Career total			251	5	60	1	25	0	35	0	2	0	373	6

== Honours ==
Grêmio

- Campeonato Gaúcho: 2007, 2010

Atlético Mineiro

- Campeonato Mineiro: 2017
