= Akhmat-Arena =

Stadium in Grozny, Russia

Coordinates: 43.323176°N 45.745252°E

Akhmat Arena
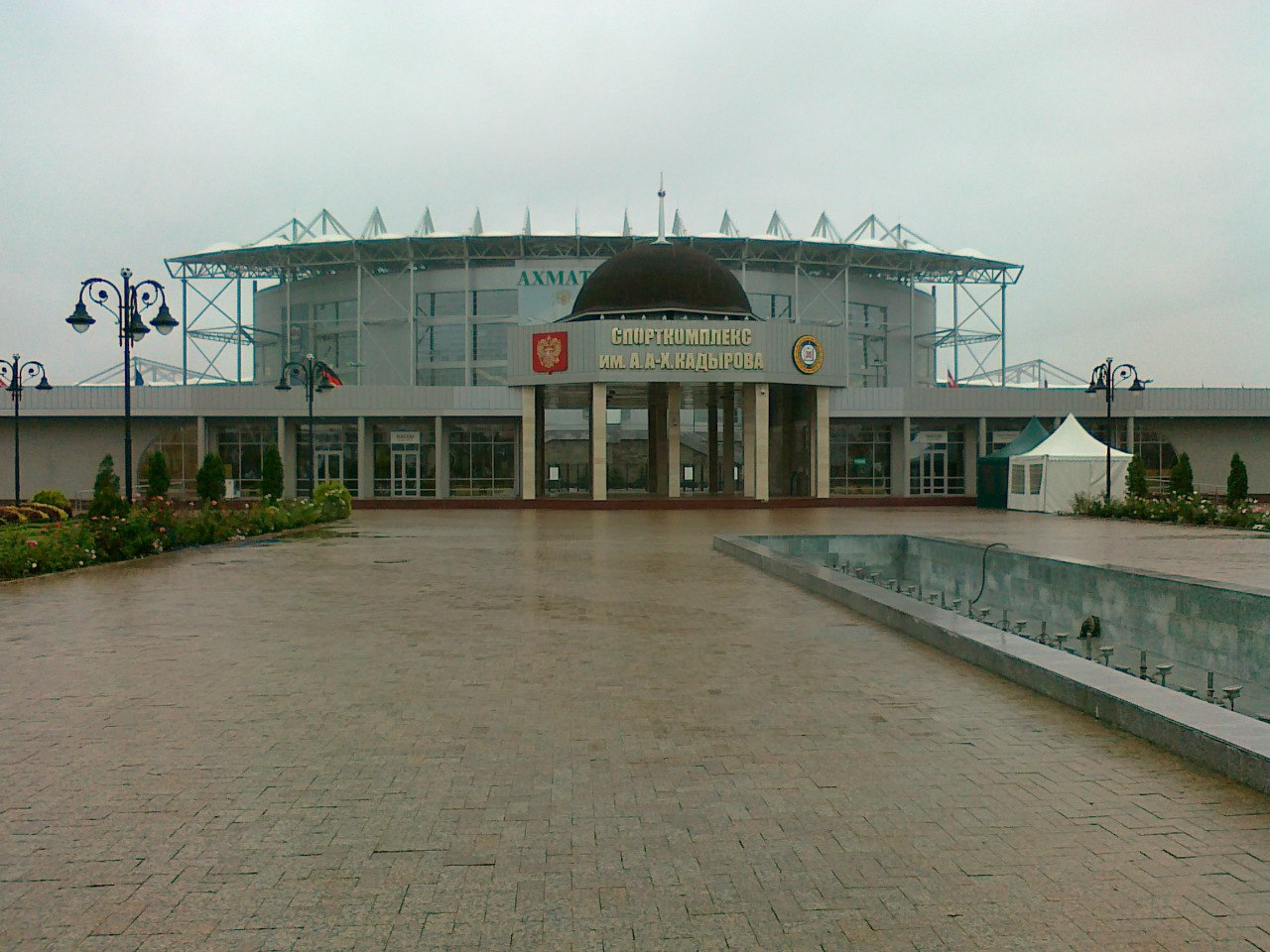
- Interactive map of Akhmat Arena
- Location: Grozny, Chechnya, Russia
- Capacity: 30,597
- Surface: Grass

Construction
- Opened: 11 May 2011

Tenant
- FC Akhmat Grozny (2011–present)

The Akhmat Arena (Russian: Ахмат Арена) is a multi-use stadium in Grozny, Chechnya, Russia, named after former President of the Chechen Republic Akhmad Kadyrov. It was completed in May 2011, and is used mostly for football matches. The stadium hosts home matches of FC Akhmat Grozny. The stadium was designed with a capacity of 30,000 spectators. It replaced Sultan Bilimkhanov Stadium as the home of FC Terek. The grand opening took place on 11 May 2011. The first competitive match in Akhmat Arena took place on 20 May 2011.

== History ==
In 2004 budget for construction of stadium was allocated by order from Vladimir Putin. Project documentation was developed in 2005. Construction started in 2006 and lasted approximately 5 years.

Akhmat-Arena was opened 11 May 2011. Opening ceremony included laser show and performances by celebrities of Chechen and worldwide music, such as Toto Cutugno, C. C. Catch and Craig David. The festivities also included a friendly match between the "Caucasus" and "World" teams. The "Caucasus" team was represented by Ramzan Kadyrov, Arsen Kanokov, Nikita Isaev, Rinat Dasayev and was managed by Alexander Khloponin, while the "World" team included famous ex-footballers such as Enzo Francescoli, Luís Figo, Franco Baresi, Fabien Barthez and Iván Zamorano and was managed by Diego Maradona. Caucasus won 5–2.

The first official match at Akhmat-Arena took place on 20 May 2011 between Russian Premier League teams Terek Grozny and FC Anzhi Makhachkala. The hosts won the match 1–0.

== Notable matches and events ==
- 1 July 2013: 2012–13 Russian Cup Final between CSKA Moscow and FC Anzhi Makhachkala. CSKA won the match in a penalty shootout.
- 15 November 2016: Russia national football team match against Romania. Russia won 1–0.
- 2018: During the 2018 FIFA World Cup, the stadium was used as a training ground by the Egypt national football team.
