= 2019–20 FC Akhmat Grozny season =

FC Akhmat Grozny
2019–20 season
- Chairman: Magomed Daudov
- Manager: Rashid Rakhimov; Until 30 September; Igor Shalimov; From 30 September
- Stadium: Akhmat-Arena
- Premier League: 13th
- Russian Cup: Quarterfinal vs Zenit St.Petersburg
- Top goalscorer: League: Odise Roshi (7); All: Odise Roshi (8)
Home colours	Away colours

The 2019–20 FC Akhmat Grozny season was the 11th successive season that the club will play in the Russian Premier League, the highest tier of association football in Russia.

== Season events ==
On 3 June, Akhmat Grozny announced their first summer signing, with Konrad Michalak joining from Lechia Gdańsk on a four-year contract for an undisclosed fee. The following day, 4 June, Andrés Ponce also signed a four-year contract after joining from Anzhi Makhachkala.

After signing a new contract with Akhmat at the end of the 2018–19 season, Zaurbek Pliyev moved to Dynamo Moscow on 9 June, with young goalkeeper Aleksandr Melikhov signing a five-year contract from FC Tom Tomsk on 12 June.

On 14 June, Pavel Kaloshin joined Akhmat Grozny on trial from Anzhi Makhachkala.

On 29 June, Denis Glushakov signed a one-year contract with Akhmat Grozny, with the option of an additional year.

On 9 July, Idris Umayev moved to Khimki on a season-long loan deal.

On 23 July, Anton Shvets signed a new contract with Akhmat Grozny, keeping him at the club until the summer of 2023.

On 30 September, after a 2–0 away defeat to Sochi, Rashid Rakhimov resigned as manager, with Igor Shalimov being appointed as Rakhimov's replacement the same day.

On 7 December, Bernard Berisha signed a new contract with Akhmat Grozny until the summer of 2023.

On 7 January 2020, Vladimir Ilyin signed a 3.5-year contract with Akhmat Grozny.

On 14 January, Damian Szymański moved to AEK Athens on loan until the end of the season, with Maksim Nenakhov joining on a 4.5-year contract on 16 January from Rotor Volgograd.

On 16 January, Akhmat Grozny announced the signing of Felipe Vizeu on loan from Udinese until the end of December 2020.

On 31 January, Konrad Michalak left Akhmat Grozny to join Ankaragücü on loan for the remainder of the season.

On 11 February, Mikhail Gashchenkov joined SKA-Khabarovsk on loan for the rest of the season.

On 14 February, Miroslav Bogosavac joined from Čukarički on loan for the rest of the season.

On 17 March, the Russian Premier League postponed all league fixtures until April 10th due to the COVID-19 pandemic.

On 1 April, the Russian Football Union extended the suspension of football until 31 May.

On 15 May, the Russian Football Union announced that the Russian Premier League season would resume on 21 June.

With their contracts due to expire on 31 May, Yevgeni Gorodov, Roland Gigolayev, Oleg Ivanov and Denis Glushakov all extended their contracts with Akhmat Grozny on 29 May until the end of the 2019–20 season.

On 30 June, Akhmat Grozny agreed the permanent transfer of Damian Szymański to AEK Athens.

On 3 July, Akhmat Grozny announced the signing of Miroslav Bogosavac on a permanent transfer from Čukarički on a four-year contract.

== Squad ==
As of match played 22 July 2020

No.	Name	Nationality	Position	Date of birth (age)	Signed from	Signed in	Contract ends	Apps.	Goals
Goalkeepers
16	Yevgeni Gorodov	(Russia)	GK	13 December 1985 (aged 34)	Krasnodar	2013	2020	145	0
33	Vitali Gudiyev	(Russia)	GK	22 April 1995 (aged 25)	Alania Vladikavkaz	2014		18	0
42	Aleksandr Melikhov	(Russia)	GK	23 March 1998 (aged 22)	Tom Tomsk	2019	2024	1	0
Defenders
3	Maksim Nenakhov	(Russia)	DF	13 December 1998 (aged 21)	Rotor Volgograd	2020	2024	9	0
4	Wilker Ángel	(Venezuela)	DF	18 March 1993 (aged 27)	Deportivo Táchira	2016		96	7
5	Magomed Musalov	(Russia)	DF	9 February 1994 (aged 26)	Anzhi Makhachkala	2019		17	0
8	Miroslav Bogosavac	(Serbia)	DF	14 October 1996 (aged 23)	loan from Čukarički	2020	2024	10	0
15	Andrei Semyonov	(Russia)	DF	24 March 1989 (aged 31)	Amkar Perm	2014	2022	193	4
20	Zoran Nižić	(Croatia)	DF	11 October 1989 (aged 30)	Hajduk Split	2018	2021	32	0
40	Rizvan Utsiyev	(Russia)	DF	7 February 1988 (aged 32)	Trainee	2005		261	8
76	Arsen Adamov	(Russia)	DF	20 October 1999 (aged 20)	Academy	2016		1	0
	Pavel Kaloshin	(Russia)	DF	13 March 1998 (aged 22)	Anzhi Makhachkala	2019	2024	0	0
Midfielders
6	Mikhail Gashchenkov	(Russia)	MF	19 June 1992 (aged 28)	Amkar Perm	2018		20	0
11	Ismael	(Brazil)	MF	1 December 1994 (aged 25)	Kalmar	2017		85	6
13	Roland Gigolayev	(Russia)	MF	4 January 1990 (aged 30)	Amkar Perm	2017	2020	9	0
14	Ravanelli	(Brazil)	MF	29 August 1997 (aged 22)	Ponte Preta	2017	2021	37	5
19	Oleg Ivanov	(Russia)	MF	4 August 1986 (aged 33)	Rostov	2012	2020	228	15
21	Odise Roshi	(Albania)	MF	22 May 1991 (aged 29)	HNK Rijeka	2016	2022	81	8
22	Lechi Sadulayev	(Russia)	MF	8 January 2000 (aged 20)	Academy	2018		8	0
23	Anton Shvets	(Russia)	MF	26 April 1993 (aged 27)	Villarreal B	2017	2023	67	5
59	Yevgeni Kharin	(Russia)	MF	11 June 1995 (aged 25)	Levadia Tallinn	2018	2022	26	1
77	Bernard Berisha	(Kosovo)	MF	24 October 1991 (aged 28)	Anzhi Makhachkala	2016	2023	79	6
88	Denis Glushakov	(Russia)	MF	27 January 1987 (aged 33)	Spartak Moscow	2019	2020	26	6
Forwards
7	Magomed Mitrishev	(Russia)	FW	10 September 1992 (aged 27)	Spartak Nalchik	2012		129	20
10	Khalid Kadyrov	(Russia)	FW	19 April 1994 (aged 26)	Trainee	2010		18	1
17	Ablaye Mbengue	(Senegal)	FW	19 May 1992 (aged 28)	Sapins	2015	2022	112	23
18	Andrés Ponce	(Venezuela)	FW	11 November 1996 (aged 23)	Anzhi Makhachkala	2019	2023	20	3
27	Felipe Vizeu	(Brazil)	FW	12 March 1997 (aged 23)	loan from Udinese	2020	2020	7	1
29	Vladimir Ilyin	(Russia)	FW	20 May 1992 (aged 28)	Ural Yekaterinburg	2020	2023	9	2
95	Abubakar Kadyrov	(Russia)	FW	26 August 1996 (aged 23)	Trainee	2012		0	0
	Idris Umayev	(Russia)	FW	15 January 1999 (aged 21)	Trainee	2016		1	0
Away on loan
9	Konrad Michalak	(Poland)	MF	19 September 1997 (aged 22)	Lechia Gdańsk	2019	2023	8	1
Players that left Akhmat Grozny during the season
8	Damian Szymański	(Poland)	MF	16 June 1995 (aged 25)	Wisła Płock	2019	2023	13	0
31	Aleksandr Sheplyakov	(Russia)	GK	13 August 1996 (aged 23)	CRFSO Smolensk	2018		0	0
70	Ayub Batsuyev	(Russia)	MF	9 February 1997 (aged 23)	Trainee	2013		6	0
93	Apti Akhyadov	(Russia)	FW	24 August 1993 (aged 26)	Trainee	2011		6	0

=== On loan ===
Note: Flags indicate national team as defined under FIFA eligibility rules; some limited exceptions apply. Players may hold more than one non-FIFA nationality.

No. / Pos. / Nation / Player; 9 / MF / POL / Konrad Michalak (at Ankaragücü)	No. / Pos. / Nation / Player

=== Left club during season ===
Note: Flags indicate national team as defined under FIFA eligibility rules; some limited exceptions apply. Players may hold more than one non-FIFA nationality.

No.	Pos.	Nation	Player
8	MF	POL	Damian Szymański (to AEK Athens)
31	GK	RUS	Aleksandr Sheplyakov

No.	Pos.	Nation	Player
70	MF	RUS	Ayub Batsuyev (to Taraz)
93	FW	RUS	Apti Akhyadov (to Tom Tomsk)

== Transfers ==
=== In ===
Date	Position	Nationality	Name	From	Fee	Ref.
Summer 2019	DF	(Russia)	Magomed Musalov	Anzhi Makhachkala	Undisclosed	
3 June 2019	MF	(Poland)	Konrad Michalak	Lechia Gdańsk	Undisclosed	
4 June 2019	FW	(Venezuela)	Andrés Ponce	Anzhi Makhachkala	Undisclosed	
12 June 2019	GK	(Russia)	Aleksandr Melikhov	Tom Tomsk	Undisclosed	
29 June 2019	MF	(Russia)	Denis Glushakov	Spartak Moscow	Free	
5 July 2019	DF	(Russia)	Pavel Kaloshin	Anzhi Makhachkala	Undisclosed	
7 January 2020	FW	(Russia)	Vladimir Ilyin	Ural Yekaterinburg	Undisclosed	
16 January 2020	DF	(Russia)	Maksim Nenakhov	Rotor Volgograd	Undisclosed	
3 July 2020	DF	(Serbia)	Miroslav Bogosavac	Čukarički	Undisclosed	

=== Loans in ===
Date from	Position	Nationality	Name	From	Date to	Ref.
16 January 2020	FW	(Brazil)	Felipe Vizeu	Udinese	31 December 2020	
14 February 2020	DF	(Serbia)	Miroslav Bogosavac	Čukarički	End of Season	

=== Out ===
Date	Position	Nationality	Name	To	Fee	Ref.
Summer 2019	FW	(Russia)	Georgi Chetvergov	Novosibirsk	Undisclosed	
Summer 2019	DF	(Russia)	Kerim Magamayev	Novosibirsk	Undisclosed	
Summer 2019	FW	(Russia)	Adam Katsayev	Tambov	Undisclosed	
Summer 2019	FW	(Russia)	Timur Osmolovskiy	CSKA Moscow	Undisclosed	
9 June 2019	DF	(Russia)	Zaurbek Pliyev	Dynamo Moscow	Undisclosed	
16 July 2019	FW	(Russia)	Zaur Sadayev	Ankaragücü	Undisclosed	
23 January 2020	FW	(Russia)	Apti Akhyadov	Tom Tomsk	Undisclosed	
29 January 2020	MF	(Russia)	Ayub Batsuyev	Taraz	Undisclosed	
30 June 2020	MF	(Poland)	Damian Szymański	AEK Athens	Undisclosed	

=== Loans out ===
Date from	Position	Nationality	Name	To	Date to	Ref.
3 July 2019	FW	(Russia)	Apti Akhyadov	Chayka Peschanokopskoye	Winter 2020	
5 July 2019	DF	(Russia)	Pavel Kaloshin	Torpedo Moscow	End of Season	
9 July 2019	FW	(Russia)	Idris Umayev	Khimki	End of Season	
29 August 2019	MF	(Russia)	Vladimir Khubulov	Zenit St.Petersburg	End of Season	
14 January 2020	MF	(Poland)	Damian Szymański	AEK Athens	30 June 2020	
31 January 2020	MF	(Poland)	Konrad Michalak	Ankaragücü	End of Season	
11 February 2020	MF	(Russia)	Mikhail Gashchenkov	SKA-Khabarovsk	End of Season	

=== Released ===
Date	Position	Nationality	Name	Joined	Date
1 September 2019	GK	(Russia)	Aleksandr Sheplyakov	Dynamo Moscow	
23 July 2020	GK	(Russia)	Yevgeni Gorodov	Krasnodar	5 August 2020
23 July 2020	MF	(Russia)	Roland Gigolayev		
23 July 2020	MF	(Russia)	Denis Glushakov	Khimki	1 October 2020
29 July 2020	DF	(Russia)	Magomed Musalov	Pyunik	1 September 2020
31 July 2020	MF	(Russia)	Vladimir Khubulov	Alania Vladikavkaz	17 August 2020

=== Trial ===
Date From	Date To	Position	Nationality	Name	Last club	Ref.
14 June 2019		DF	(Russia)	Pavel Kaloshin	Anzhi Makhachkala	

== Friendlies ==
19 June 2019	Maribor (Slovenia)	2 – 3	(Russia) Akhmat Grozny	Austria
18:30 MSK (UTC+3)	Kramarič 9'; Tavares 80'	Report	Ponce 32'; Ivanov 48'; Berisha 73'

22 June 2019	MOL Vidi (Hungary)	1 – 2	(Russia) Akhmat Grozny	Austria
18:00 MSK (UTC+3)	Huszti 30'	Report	Berisha 58' (pen.), 84'

26 June 2019	DAC Dunajská Streda (Slovakia)	1 – 5	(Russia) Akhmat Grozny	Austria
18:00 MSK (UTC+3)	Kalmár 49'	Report	Mbengue 3', 30', 51', 53', 60'

2 July 2019	Sturm Graz (Austria)	0 – 3	(Russia) Akhmat Grozny	Austria
MSK (UTC+3)		Report	Mbengue 34'; Ivanov 50'; Ponce 83' (pen.)

5 July 2019	Inter Zaprešić (Croatia)	1 – 1	(Russia) Akhmat Grozny	Austria
18:30 MSK (UTC+3)	31'	Report	Berisha 39' (pen.)

9 July 2019	Holstein Kiel (Germany)	0 – 1	(Russia) Akhmat Grozny	Austria
18:00 MSK (UTC+3)		Report	Berisha 60'

17 January 2020	Paks (Hungary)	1 – 2	(Russia) Akhmat Grozny	Belek, Turkey
17:30 MSK (UTC+3)	Böde 81' (pen.)	Report	Ismael 30'; Roshi 44'

20 January 2020	Botoșani (Romania)	3 – 1	(Russia) Akhmat Grozny	Belek, Turkey
17:00 MSK (UTC+3)	Dugandžić 15', 39'; Cîmpanu 90+3' (pen.)	Report	K.Kadyrov 58'

1 February 2020	Shakhtyor Soligorsk (Belarus)	3 – 1	(Russia) Akhmat Grozny	Belek, Turkey
17:00 MSK (UTC+3)	A.Bulychev 4'; Diasamidze (yellow card) 30'; Bodul 77' (pen.)	Report	A.Kadyrov 47'

2 February 2020	Mura (Slovenia)	1 – 2	(Russia) Akhmat Grozny	Belek, Turkey
17:00 MSK (UTC+3)	L.Sasnjara 65'	Report	Roshi 53'; Ilyin 58'

5 February 2020	Željezničar Sarajevo (Bosnia and Herzegovina)	2 – 2	(Russia) Akhmat Grozny	Belek, Turkey
17:00 MSK (UTC+3)	Veselinović (red card) 36'; Jamak (yellow card) (yellow-red card) 51'; Lendrić 66'; Štilić 80'	Report	Mitrishev 48', 70'

6 February 2020	Ludogorets Razgrad (Bulgaria)	0 – 1	(Russia) Akhmat Grozny	Belek, Turkey
17:00 MSK (UTC+3)		Report	Ponce 86'

14 February 2020	Sochi	2 – 2	Akhmat Grozny	Belek, Turkey
17:00 MSK (UTC+3)	Berisha 72'; Ilyin 78'	Report	Poloz 10'; Mostovoy 11'

17 February 2020	Ventspils (Latvia)	1 – 0	(Russia) Akhmat Grozny	Belek, Turkey
17:00 MSK (UTC+3)	Lucas Villela 36'	Report

20 February 2020	Zhetysu (Kazakhstan)	0 – 1	(Russia) Akhmat Grozny	Belek, Turkey
17:00 MSK (UTC+3)		Report	Goal

== Competitions ==
=== Premier League ===
==== Results by round ====
Round	1	2	3	4	5	6	7	8	9	10	11	12	13	14	15	16	17	18	19	20	21	22	23	24	25	26	27	28	29	30
Ground	H	A	A	H	H	A	A	H	A	H	A	A	H	H	A	H	A	H	H	H	A	H	A	H	A	H	A	H	A	A
Result	W	L	L	W	L	D	L	D	L	D	L	W	L	D	D	D	W	D	L	D	L	L	W	D	W	L	W	D	L	L
Position	6	11	13	9	10	11	12	12	12	12	15	14	14	15	15	15	13	12	12	15	16	16	14	14	13	14	13	13	13	13

Updated to match(es) played on 22 July 2020. Source: See Results
A = Away; H = Home; W = Win; D = Draw; L = Loss

==== Results ====
14 July 2019 1	Akhmat Grozny	1 – 0	Krasnodar	Grozny
21:30 MSK (UTC+3)	Berisha (penalty missed) 10' 28'; Nižić (yellow card) 33'; Kharin (yellow card) 36'; Ismael (yellow card) 82'; Gorodov (yellow card) 90+4'	Report	Petrov (yellow card) 9'; Kambolov (yellow card) 71'; Vilhena (yellow card) 90+1'	Stadium: Akhmat-Arena; Attendance: 27,535; Referee: Vitali Meshkov

21 July 2019 2	Ural Yekaterinburg	3 – 0	Akhmat Grozny	Yekaterinburg
14:00 MSK (UTC+3)	Boumal (yellow card) 19'; Ilyin 45+2'; El Kabir 58'; Bavin 78'	Report	Szymański (yellow card) 56'	Stadium: Central Stadium; Attendance: 15,611; Referee: Aleksey Sukhoy

29 July 2019 3	Rubin Kazan	1 – 0	Akhmat Grozny	Kazan
20:00 MSK (UTC+3)	Kjartansson 73'; Konovalov (yellow card) 74'; Danchenko (yellow card) 88'	Report	Ivanov (yellow card) 60'; Berisha (yellow card) 63'; Kharin (yellow card) 81'	Stadium: Kazan Arena; Attendance: 11,342; Referee: Sergey Ivanov

5 August 2019 4	Akhmat Grozny	2 – 1	Orenburg	Grozny
20:00 MSK (UTC+3)	Shvets (yellow card) 23'; Nižić (yellow card) 26'; Kharin 49'; Roshi 70'; Glushakov (yellow card) 90+3'	Report	Shakhov (yellow card) 4'; Despotović 64' (yellow card) 69'	Stadium: Akhmat-Arena; Attendance: 11,721; Referee: Nikolay Voloshin

11 August 2019 5	Akhmat Grozny	1 – 3	Spartak Moscow	Grozny
21:30 MSK (UTC+3)	Shvets (yellow card) 13'; Mbengue 75' (yellow card) 75' (yellow-red card) 77'; Berisha (yellow card) 80'	Report	Til (yellow card) 8'; Bakayev 32', 44'; Schürrle 70'; Zobnin (yellow card) 90'	Stadium: Akhmat-Arena; Attendance: 17,832; Referee: Aleksey Sukhoy

17 August 2019 6	Zenit St.Petersburg	0 – 0	Akhmat Grozny	Saint Petersburg
19:00 MSK (UTC+3)	Smolnikov (yellow card) 24'; Ozdoyev (yellow card) 74'; Rakitskiy (yellow card) 90+4'	Report	Utsiyev (red card) 7'; Berisha (yellow card) 14'; Roshi (yellow card) 66'; Nižić (yellow card) 90+4'	Stadium: Krestovsky Stadium; Attendance: 48,468; Referee: Aleksei Matyunin

25 August 2019 7	CSKA Moscow	3 – 0	Akhmat Grozny	Moscow
16:30 MSK (UTC+3)	Magnússon (yellow card) 34'; Fernandes 43'; Kuchayev (yellow card) 52'; Šarlija (yellow card) 62'; Chalov 66'; Vlašić 73'	Report	Ivanov (yellow card) 32'; Kharin (yellow card) 41'; Ángel (yellow card) 62'; Semyonov (yellow card) 62'	Stadium: VEB Arena; Attendance: 18,508; Referee: Vasili Kazartsev

31 August 2019 8	Akhmat Grozny	1 – 1	Tambov	Grozny
19:00 MSK (UTC+3)	Nižić (yellow card) 27'; Berisha 90+2'	Report	Osipenko 5'; Ciupercă (yellow card) 30'; Mamtov (yellow card) 90+1'; Benito (yellow card) 90+1'	Stadium: Akhmat-Arena; Attendance: 8,743; Referee: Sergei Karasev

16 September 2019 9	Rostov	2 – 1	Akhmat Grozny	Rostov-on-Don
20:30 MSK (UTC+3)	Bayramyan 54'; Normann 64'; Saplinov (yellow card) 85'	Report	Roshi 19' (pen.); Shvets (red card) 62'	Stadium: Rostov Arena; Attendance: 28,772; Referee: Nikolay Voloshin

21 September 2019 10	Akhmat Grozny	1 – 1	Krylia Sovetov	Grozny
14:00 MSK (UTC+3)	Utsiyev (yellow card) 12'; Ponce 27'; Roshi (yellow card) 33'; Ángel (yellow card) 67'	Report	Karpov (yellow card) 45' (goal) 90+4'; Chernov (yellow card) 50'	Stadium: Akhmat-Arena; Attendance: 8,737; Referee: Stanislav Vasilyev

30 September 2019 11	Sochi	2 – 0	Akhmat Grozny	Sochi
19:30 MSK (UTC+3)	Mostovoy 12' (yellow card) 34'; Pomerko (yellow card) 41'; Noboa 73' (yellow card) 74'; Miladinović (yellow card) 78'; Karapetian (yellow card) 87'; Nabiullin (yellow card) 90+3'	Report	Nižić (yellow card) 62'	Stadium: Fisht Olympic Stadium; Attendance: 7,127; Referee: Aleksei Eskov

5 October 2019 12	Ufa	0 – 1	Akhmat Grozny	Ufa
11:30 MSK (UTC+3)	Vombergar (yellow card) 32'; Tabidze (yellow card) 55'	Report	Ángel 9'; Glushakov (yellow card) 25'; Ponce (yellow card) 40'	Stadium: Neftyanik Stadium; Attendance: 7,538; Referee: Vladislav Bezborodov

18 October 2019 13	Akhmat Grozny	0 – 2	Lokomotiv Moscow	Grozny
19:30 MSK (UTC+3)	Kharin (yellow card) 74'; Utsiyev (yellow card) 89'	Report	Kolomeytsev 23'; Zhivoglyadov (yellow card) 40'; Kulikov (yellow card) 80'; João Mário 86'	Stadium: Akhmat-Arena; Attendance: 13,776; Referee: Stanislav Vasilyev

26 October 2019 14	Akhmat Grozny	1 – 1	Arsenal Tula	Grozny
16:30 MSK (UTC+3)	Semyonov 20'; Roshi (yellow card) 79' (yellow-red card) 84'; Shvets (yellow card) 88'; Utsiyev (yellow card) 90+3'	Report	Lomovitsky (yellow card) 18'; Kostadinov (yellow card) 23'; Álvarez (yellow card) 29'; Kangwa 76'	Stadium: Akhmat-Arena; Attendance: 11,265; Referee: Nikolay Voloshin

2 November 2019 15	Dynamo Moscow	1 – 1	Akhmat Grozny	Moscow
14:00 MSK (UTC+3)	Ordets (yellow card) 28' (goal) 90+3'; Panchenko (penalty missed) 31'; Morozov (yellow card) 43'; Kaboré (yellow card) 56' (yellow-red card) 60'; Igboun (yellow card) 90+1'	Report	Ángel (yellow card) 5'; Ponce (yellow card) 9' (goal) 43' (pen.); Musalov (yellow card) 31'; Glushakov (yellow card) 56'; Semyonov (yellow card) 90+1'	Stadium: VTB Arena; Attendance: 10,092; Referee: Sergey Lapochkin

8 November 2019 16	Akhmat Grozny	0 – 0	Ural Yekaterinburg	Grozny
19:30 MSK (UTC+3)	Gigolayev (yellow card) 47'; Shvets (yellow card) 61'	Report		Stadium: Akhmat-Arena; Attendance: 12,474; Referee: Sergey Ivanov

23 November 2019 17	Orenburg	1 – 2	Akhmat Grozny	Orenburg
11:30 MSK (UTC+3)	Ayupov (yellow card) 35'; Dovbnya (yellow card) 39'; Malykh (yellow card) 72'; Škoflek 90'	Report	Gigolayev (yellow card) 33'; Ponce 36' (pen.); Ivanov (yellow card) 64'; Roshi (yellow card) 66' (goal) 74'	Stadium: Gazovik Stadium; Attendance: 1,745; Referee: Aleksei Eskov

30 November 2019 18	Akhmat Grozny	1 – 1	Rubin Kazan	Grozny
19:00 MSK (UTC+3)	Glushakov 31'; Kharin (yellow card) 64'; Ismael (yellow card) 74'; Ivanov (yellow card) 83'	Report	Ig.Konovalov (yellow card) 35'; Uremović (yellow card) 63'; Kvaratskhelia 90+3'	Stadium: Akhmat-Arena; Attendance: 11,564; Referee: Igor Panin

7 December 2019 19	Akhmat Grozny	0 – 1	Ufa	Grozny
19:00 MSK (UTC+3)		Report	Aliyev 10'	Stadium: Akhmat-Arena; Attendance: 13,214; Referee: Sergei Karasev

29 February 2020 20	Akhmat Grozny	1 – 1	Rostov	Grozny
19:00 MSK (UTC+3)	Roshi (yellow card) 18' (goal) 49' (pen.); Kharin (yellow card) 70'; Ismael (yellow card) 82'; Semyonov (yellow card) 86'; Berisha (yellow card) 90+1'	Report	Zaynutdinov (yellow card) 13'; Normann (yellow card) 32'; Shomurodov 45'; Hadžikadunić (yellow card) 46'	Stadium: Akhmat-Arena; Attendance: 12,681; Referee: Sergey Lapochkin

8 March 2020 21	Lokomotiv Moscow	1 – 0	Akhmat Grozny	Moscow
19:00 MSK (UTC+3)	Eder 32'; Magkeyev (yellow card) 68'; Mário (yellow card) 72'; Ignatyev (yellow card) 82'; Kvirkvelia (red card) 84'	Report	Ismael (yellow card) 52'; Vizeu (yellow card) 71' (penalty missed) 85'; Ivanov (yellow card) 81'	Stadium: RZD Arena; Attendance: 14,689; Referee: Kirill Levnikov

13 March 2020 22	Akhmat Grozny	2 – 3	Dynamo Moscow	Grozny
19:30 MSK (UTC+3)	Roshi 10' (yellow card) 90+2'; Kharin (yellow card) 31'; Ravanelli (yellow card) 45+2'; Ángel (yellow card) 47'; Utsiyev (yellow card) 50'; Berisha (yellow card) 79'; Glushakov 89'	Report	Rausch 26'; Parshivlyuk (yellow card) 42'; Philipp 50' (pen.); Skopintsev 86'; Komlichenko (yellow card) 90+5'	Stadium: Akhmat-Arena; Attendance: 13,232; Referee: Vitali Meshkov

19 June 2020 23	Krylia Sovetov	2 – 4	Akhmat Grozny	Samara
18:00 MSK (UTC+3)	Burlak 6'; Chernov (yellow card) 62'; Golenkov (yellow card) 79'; Glushenkov 88'; Gațcan (yellow card) 90+1'	Report	Berisha (yellow card) 1' (goal) 69'; Ilyin 54', 66'; Glushakov 59'; Nižić (yellow card) 72'	Stadium: Samara Arena; Referee: Aleksey Eskov
Note: Match originally scheduled for 22 March, but postponed on 17 March due to the COVID-19 pandemic.

26 June 2020 24	Akhmat Grozny	1 – 1	Sochi	Grozny
18:00 MSK (UTC+3)	Ivanov (yellow card) 31'; Glushakov 33'	Report	Margasov (yellow card) 10'; Burmistrov 45+1'	Stadium: Akhmat-Arena; Referee: Sergei Karasev
Note: Match originally scheduled for 5 April, but postponed on 17 March due to the COVID-19 pandemic.

1 July 2020 25	Arsenal Tula	1 – 3	Akhmat Grozny	Tula
17:30 MSK (UTC+3)	Kostadinov (yellow card) 15'; Khagush (yellow card) 24'; Lutsenko 90+2'	Report	Kharin 15' (yellow card) 24'; Roshi 22' (pen.), 88'; Bogosavac (yellow card) 33'; Glushakov (yellow card) 69'; Ivanov (yellow card) 71'	Stadium: Arsenal Stadium; Referee: Vasiliy Kazartsev
Note: Match originally scheduled for 12 April, but postponed on 1 April due to the COVID-19 pandemic.

4 July 2020 26	Akhmat Grozny	0 – 4	CSKA Moscow	Grozny
20:30 MSK (UTC+3)		Report	Maradishvili (yellow card) 29'; Chalov 61'; Vlašić 62'; Sigurðsson 65'; Shchennikov (yellow card) 73'; Semyonov (yellow card) 84'	Stadium: Akhmat-Arena; Referee: Pavel Kukuyan
Note: Match originally scheduled for 18 April, but postponed on 1 April due to the COVID-19 pandemic.

7 July 2020 27	Tambov	1 – 2	Akhmat Grozny	Nizhny Novgorod
18:30 MSK (UTC+3)	Gritsayenko (yellow card) 20'; Melkadze 33' (pen.) (yellow card) 90+3'; Takazov (yellow card) 82'	Report	Ismael 20' (pen.) (yellow card) 45+2'; Shvets (yellow card) 52'; Nižić (yellow card) 63'; Vizeu 73'; Glushakov (yellow card) 80'; Gorodov (yellow card) 90+2'	Stadium: Nizhny Novgorod Stadium; Referee: Sergey Ivanov
Note: Match played at the Nizhny Novgorod Stadium in Nizhny Novgorod instead of Tambov's regular Spartak Stadium. Match originally scheduled for 25 April, but postponed on 1 April due to the COVID-19 pandemic.

11 July 2020 28	Akhmat Grozny	1 – 1	Zenit St.Petersburg	Grozny
18:30 MSK (UTC+3)	Ivanov 6'; Ismael (yellow card) 87'	Report	Rigoni (yellow card) 10' (yellow-red card) 34'; Driussi 22'	Stadium: Akhmat-Arena; Referee: Mikhail Vilkov
Note: Match originally scheduled for 1 May, but postponed on 1 April due to the COVID-19 pandemic.

15 July 2020 29	Spartak Moscow	3 – 0	Akhmat Grozny	Moscow
18:00 MSK (UTC+3)	Zobnin 51'; Sobolev 81'; Til (yellow card) 90' (goal) 90+3'	Report	Nenakhov (yellow card) 26'; Nižić (yellow card) 39'	Stadium: Otkritie Arena; Referee: Aleksey Sukhoy
Note: Match originally scheduled for 6 May, but postponed on 1 April due to the COVID-19 pandemic.

22 July 2020 30	Krasnodar	4 – 0	Akhmat Grozny	Krasnodar
19:00 MSK (UTC+3)	Wanderson (yellow card) 20' (goal) 58'; Berg 43', 62'; Cabella 54'	Report	Kharin (yellow card) 8'; Berisha (yellow card) 24'; Ivanov (yellow card) 64'; Adamov (yellow card) 82'	Stadium: Krasnodar Stadium; Referee: Vladislav Bezborodov
Note: Match originally scheduled for 17 May, but postponed on 1 April due to the COVID-19 pandemic.

==== League table ====
Pos	Team	Pld	W	D	L	GF	GA	GD	Pts	Qualification or relegation
11	Ural	30	9	8	13	36	53	−17	35 (Note: Head-to-head points: Rubin Kazan 4, Ural 1)	
12	Sochi	30	8	9	13	40	39	+1	33	
13	Akhmat Grozny	30	7	10	13	27	46	−19	31 (Note: Head-to-head points: Akhmat Grozny 8, Tambov 4, Krylia Sovetov Samara 4. Head-to-head goal difference: Akhmat Grozny +3, Tambov 0, Krylia Sovetov Samara –3)	
14	Tambov	30	9	4	17	37	41	−4	31	
15	Krylia Sovetov Samara (R)	30	8	7	15	33	40	−7	31	Relegation to Football National League

Source: Russian Premier Liga, Soccerway
Rules for classification: 1) Points; 2) Head-to-head points; 3) Head-to-head matches won; 4) Head-to-head goal difference; 5) Head-to-head goals scored; 6) Matches won; 7) Goal difference; 8) Goals scored; 9) Play-off.
(R) Relegated

=== Russian Cup ===
25 September 2019 Round of 32	SKA-Khabarovsk	2 – 2 (a.e.t.) (2–4 p)	Akhmat Grozny	Khabarovsk
12:00 MSK (UTC+3)	Gadzhimuradov (yellow card) 43'; Katsaev 82' (pen.); Nižić 101' (o.g.)	Report	Utsiyev (yellow card) 6'; Berisha 76'; Mitrishev 110'	Stadium: Lenin Stadium; Attendance: 3,956; Referee: Anton Frolov
	Penalties
	Gadzhimuradov (penalty scored); Kamilov (penalty scored); Maleyev (penalty missed); Oancea (penalty missed)		Berisha (penalty scored); Gashchenkov (penalty scored); Ismael (penalty missed); Ángel (penalty scored); Roshi (penalty scored)

30 October 2019 Round of 16	Akhmat Grozny	5 – 1	Luch Vladivostok	Grozny
18:00 MSK (UTC+3)	Mbengue 11'; Ángel 21' (pen.) (yellow card) 53'; Shvets (yellow card) 30'; Michalak 65'; Glushakov 67', 78'	Report	Botaka-Ioboma (yellow card) 23'; Salamatov (yellow card) 26' (goal) 54'; S.Ponomarenko (yellow card) 45'; Abazov (yellow card) 59'	Stadium: Akhmat-Arena; Attendance: 12,418; Referee: Aleksei Matyunin

4 March 2019 Quarterfinal	Akhmat Grozny	1 – 2 (a.e.t.)	Zenit St.Petersburg	Grozny
18:00 MSK (UTC+3)	Ivanov (yellow card) 56'; Roshi 59' (pen.); Ismael (yellow card) 67'; Nenakhov (yellow card) 71'; Ángel (yellow card) 85'; Ravanelli (yellow card) 114'	Report	Rigoni 78'; Zhirkov 97'	Stadium: Akhmat-Arena; Attendance: 16,411; Referee: Nikolay Voloshin

== Squad statistics ==
As of match played 22 July 2020

=== Appearances and goals ===
No.	Pos	Nat	Player	Total		Premier League		Russian Cup	
No.	Pos	Nat	Player	Apps	Goals	Apps	Goals	Apps	Goals
3	DF	(Russia) RUS	Maksim Nenakhov	10	0	9	0	1	0
4	DF	(Venezuela) VEN	Wilker Ángel	22	2	18+1	1	3	1
5	DF	(Russia) RUS	Magomed Musalov	11	0	9	0	2	0
6	MF	(Russia) RUS	Mikhail Gashchenkov	8	0	3+3	0	1+1	0
7	FW	(Russia) RUS	Magomed Mitrishev	11	1	2+7	0	0+2	1
8	DF	(Serbia) SRB	Miroslav Bogosavac	11	0	9+1	0	1	0
10	FW	(Russia) RUS	Khalid Kadyrov	2	0	0+1	0	0+1	0
11	MF	(Brazil) BRA	Ismael	31	1	28+1	1	2	0
13	MF	(Russia) RUS	Roland Gigolayev	8	0	8	0	0	0
14	MF	(Brazil) BRA	Ravanelli	6	0	3+2	0	0+1	0
15	DF	(Russia) RUS	Andrei Semyonov	32	1	30	1	2	0
16	GK	(Russia) RUS	Yevgeni Gorodov	28	0	25	0	3	0
17	FW	(Senegal) SEN	Ablaye Mbengue	18	2	5+11	1	1+1	1
18	FW	(Venezuela) VEN	Andrés Ponce	21	3	14+6	3	1	0
19	MF	(Russia) RUS	Oleg Ivanov	30	1	25+2	1	2+1	0
20	DF	(Croatia) CRO	Zoran Nižić	22	0	18+3	0	1	0
21	MF	(Albania) ALB	Odise Roshi	28	7	19+7	6	2	1
22	MF	(Russia) RUS	Lechi Sadulayev	6	0	2+4	0	0	0
23	MF	(Russia) RUS	Anton Shvets	21	0	15+4	0	2	0
27	FW	(Brazil) BRA	Felipe Vizeu	7	1	3+4	1	0	0
29	FW	(Russia) RUS	Vladimir Ilyin	9	2	5+3	2	1	0
33	GK	(Russia) RUS	Vitali Gudiyev	4	0	4	0	0	0
40	DF	(Russia) RUS	Rizvan Utsiyev	15	0	14	0	1	0
42	GK	(Russia) RUS	Aleksandr Melikhov	1	0	1	0	0	0
59	MF	(Russia) RUS	Yevgeni Kharin	24	2	17+5	2	1+1	0
76	DF	(Russia) RUS	Arsen Adamov	1	0	1	0	0	0
77	MF	(Kosovo) KOS	Bernard Berisha	25	4	17+5	3	2+1	1
88	MF	(Russia) RUS	Denis Glushakov	27	6	22+2	4	2+1	2
Players away from the club on loan:
9	MF	(Poland) POL	Konrad Michalak	8	1	2+4	0	2	1
Players who appeared for Akhmat Grozny but left during the season:
8	MF	(Poland) POL	Damian Szymański	4	0	2+2	0	0	0

=== Goal scorers ===
Place	Position	Nation	Number	Name	Premier League	Russian Cup	Total
1	MF	(Albania)	21	Odise Roshi	7	1	8
2	MF	(Russia)	88	Denis Glushakov	4	2	6
3	MF	(Kosovo)	77	Bernard Berisha	3	1	4
4	FW	(Venezuela)	18	Andrés Ponce	3	0	3
5	FW	(Russia)	29	Vladimir Ilyin	2	0	2
5	MF	(Russia)	59	Yevgeni Kharin	2	0	2
5	FW	(Senegal)	17	Ablaye Mbengue	1	1	2
5	DF	(Venezuela)	4	Wilker Ángel	1	1	2
7	MF	(Russia)	15	Andrei Semyonov	1	0	1
7	MF	(Brazil)	11	Ismael	1	0	1
7	FW	(Brazil)	27	Felipe Vizeu	1	0	1
7	MF	(Russia)	19	Oleg Ivanov	1	0	1
7	FW	(Russia)	7	Magomed Mitrishev	0	1	1
7	MF	(Poland)	9	Konrad Michalak	0	1	1
Total					27	8	35

=== Clean sheets ===
Place	Position	Nation	Number	Name	Premier League	Russian Cup	Total
1	GK	(Russia)	16	Yevgeni Gorodov	3	0	3
2	GK	(Russia)	33	Vitali Gudiyev	1	0	1
Total					4	0	4

=== Disciplinary record ===
Number	Nation	Position	Name	Premier League		Russian Cup		Total	
Number	Nation	Position	Name	Yellow card	Red card	Yellow card	Red card	Yellow card	Red card
3	(Russia)	DF	Maksim Nenakhov	1	0	1	0	2	0
4	(Venezuela)	DF	Wilker Ángel	4	0	2	0	6	0
5	(Russia)	DF	Magomed Musalov	1	0	0	0	1	0
8	(Serbia)	DF	Miroslav Bogosavac	1	0	0	0	1	0
11	(Brazil)	MF	Ismael	6	0	1	0	7	0
13	(Russia)	MF	Roland Gigolayev	2	0	0	0	2	0
14	(Brazil)	MF	Ravanelli	1	0	1	0	2	0
15	(Russia)	DF	Andrei Semyonov	3	0	0	0	3	0
16	(Russia)	GK	Yevgeni Gorodov	2	0	0	0	2	0
17	(Senegal)	FW	Ablaye Mbengue	2	1	0	0	2	1
18	(Venezuela)	FW	Andrés Ponce	2	0	0	0	2	0
19	(Russia)	MF	Oleg Ivanov	8	0	1	0	9	0
20	(Croatia)	DF	Zoran Nižić	8	0	0	0	8	0
21	(Albania)	MF	Odise Roshi	7	1	0	0	7	1
23	(Russia)	MF	Anton Shvets	5	1	1	0	6	1
27	(Brazil)	FW	Felipe Vizeu	1	0	0	0	1	0
40	(Russia)	DF	Rizvan Utsiyev	4	1	1	0	5	1
59	(Russia)	MF	Yevgeni Kharin	9	0	0	0	9	0
76	(Russia)	DF	Arsen Adamov	1	0	0	0	1	0
77	(Kosovo)	MF	Bernard Berisha	7	0	0	0	7	0
88	(Russia)	MF	Denis Glushakov	5	0	0	0	5	0
Players away on loan:
Players who left Akhmat Grozny during the season:
8	(Poland)	MF	Damian Szymański	1	0	0	0	1	0
Total				81	4	8	0	89	4
