= 2018–19 FC Akhmat Grozny season =

FC Akhmat Grozny
2018–19 season
- Chairman: Magomed Daudov
- Manager: Igor Lediakhov (until 2 September); Ruslan İdiqov (caretaker) (2-5 September); Rashid Rakhimov (from 5 September)
- Stadium: Akhmat-Arena
- Premier League: 8th
- Russian Cup: Round of 16 vs Arsenal Tula
- Top goalscorer: League: Two Players (5); All: Two Players (5)
Home colours	Away colours

The 2018–19 FC Akhmat Grozny season was the tenth successive season that the club will play in the Russian Premier League, the highest tier of association football in Russia, and their second as Akhmat Grozny. Akhmat Grozny finished the season in 8th place, whilst also reaching the Round of 16 in the Russian Cup, where they were defeated by Arsenal Tula.

== Season review ==
On 2 September, Lediakhov resigned as manager, with Ruslan İdiqov being appointed as the caretaker manager. On 5 September, Akhmat Grozny announced the return of Rashid Rakhimov as manager.

On 19 May, Andrei Semyonov signed a new contract with Akhmat Grozny, keeping him at the club until 2022.

On 25 May, Yevgeni Gorodov signed a new one-year contract, whilst Odise Roshi signed a new three-year contract that will keep him in Grozny until the summer of 2022.

On 27 May, Akhmat Grozny announced that Milad Mohammadi and Bekim Balaj had left the club after their contracts had expired, whilst Rodolfo had retired and joined their coaching staff, and Ablaye Mbengue had signed a new three-year contract, keeping him in Grozny until the summer of 2022.

== Squad ==
As of match played 26 May 2019

No.	Name	Nationality	Position	Date of birth (age)	Signed from	Signed in	Contract ends	Apps.	Goals
Goalkeepers
16	Yevgeni Gorodov	(Russia)	GK	13 December 1985 (aged 33)	Krasnodar	2013	2020	118	0
31	Aleksandr Sheplyakov	(Russia)	GK	13 August 1996 (aged 22)	CRFSO Smolensk	2018		0	0
33	Vitali Gudiyev	(Russia)	GK	22 April 1995 (aged 24)	Alania Vladikavkaz	2014		14	0
Defenders
2	Rodolfo	(Brazil)	DF	23 October 1982 (aged 36)	Vasco da Gama	2015		85	5
3	Zaurbek Pliyev	(Russia)	DF	27 September 1991 (aged 27)	Kairat	2015	2019	54	0
4	Wilker Ángel	(Venezuela)	DF	18 March 1993 (aged 26)	Deportivo Táchira	2016		74	5
5	Magomed Musalov	(Russia)	DF	9 February 1994 (aged 25)	loan from Anzhi Makhachkala	2018	2019	6	0
13	Milad Mohammadi	(Iran)	DF	29 September 1993 (aged 25)	Rah Ahan Tehran	2016	2019	82	3
15	Andrei Semyonov	(Russia)	DF	24 March 1989 (aged 30)	Amkar Perm	2014	2022	162	3
20	Zoran Nižić	(Croatia)	DF	11 October 1989 (aged 29)	Hajduk Split	2018	2021	11	0
40	Rizvan Utsiyev	(Russia)	DF	7 February 1988 (aged 31)	Trainee	2005		246	8
Midfielders
6	Mikhail Gashchenkov	(Russia)	MF	19 June 1992 (aged 26)	Amkar Perm	2018		12	0
8	Damian Szymański	(Poland)	MF	16 June 1995 (aged 23)	Wisła Płock	2019		9	0
11	Ismael	(Brazil)	MF	1 December 1994 (aged 24)	Kalmar	2017		55	5
14	Ravanelli	(Brazil)	MF	29 August 1997 (aged 21)	Ponte Preta	2017	2021	32	5
19	Oleg Ivanov	(Russia)	MF	4 August 1986 (aged 32)	Rostov	2012		199	14
21	Odise Roshi	(Albania)	MF	22 May 1991 (aged 28)	HNK Rijeka	2016	2022	54	2
23	Anton Shvets	(Russia)	MF	26 April 1993 (aged 26)	Villarreal B	2017	2021	46	5
59	Yevgeni Kharin	(Russia)	MF	11 June 1995 (aged 23)	Levadia Tallinn	2018	2022	3	0
77	Bernard Berisha	(Kosovo)	MF	24 October 1991 (aged 27)	Anzhi Makhachkala	2016	2020	54	2
87	Lechi Sadulayev	(Russia)	MF	8 January 2000 (aged 19)	Trainee	2018		2	0
Forwards
7	Abubakar Kadyrov	(Russia)	FW	26 August 1996 (aged 22)	Trainee	2012		0	0
10	Khalid Kadyrov	(Russia)	FW	19 April 1994 (aged 25)	Trainee	2010		16	1
17	Ablaye Mbengue	(Senegal)	FW	19 May 1992 (aged 27)	Sapins	2015	2022	94	21
18	Bekim Balaj	(Albania)	FW	11 January 1991 (aged 28)	HNK Rijeka	2016		64	13
95	Magomed Mitrishev	(Russia)	FW	10 September 1992 (aged 26)	Spartak Nalchik	2012		119	19
Away on loan
9	Zaur Sadayev	(Russia)	FW	6 November 1989 (aged 29)	Trainee	2006		138	20
24	Roland Gigolayev	(Russia)	MF	4 January 1990 (aged 29)	Amkar Perm	2017	2020	1	0
27	Idris Umayev	(Russia)	FW	15 January 1999 (aged 20)	Trainee	2016		1	0
70	Ayub Batsuyev	(Russia)	MF	9 February 1997 (aged 22)	Trainee	2013		6	0
93	Apti Akhyadov	(Russia)	FW	24 August 1993 (aged 25)	Trainee	2011		6	0
Players that left Akhmat Grozny during the season
8	Idrissa Doumbia	(Ivory Coast)	MF	14 April 1998 (aged 21)	Anderlecht	2018		17	1

=== On loan ===
Note: Flags indicate national team as defined under FIFA eligibility rules; some limited exceptions apply. Players may hold more than one non-FIFA nationality.

No.	Pos.	Nation	Player
—	MF	RUS	Ayub Batsuyev (at Chayka Peschanokopskoye until 30 June 2019)
—	MF	RUS	Roland Gigolayev (at Chayka Peschanokopskoye until 30 June 2019)

No.	Pos.	Nation	Player
—	FW	RUS	Apti Akhyadov (at Anzhi Makhachkala until 30 June 2019)
—	FW	RUS	Idris Umayev (at (Lithuania) Palanga until 30 June 2019)

=== Left club during season ===
Note: Flags indicate national team as defined under FIFA eligibility rules; some limited exceptions apply. Players may hold more than one non-FIFA nationality.

No.	Pos.	Nation	Player
8	FW	CIV	Idrissa Doumbia (to Sporting)

== Transfers ==
=== In ===
Date	Position	Nationality	Name	From	Fee	Ref.
20 June 2018	MF	(Russia)	Mikhail Gashchenkov	Amkar Perm	Undisclosed	
21 June 2018	GK	(Russia)	Aleksandr Sheplyakov	SFC CRFSO Smolensk	Undisclosed	
29 June 2018	MF	(Ivory Coast)	Idrissa Doumbia	Anderlecht	Undisclosed	
8 August 2018	DF	(Croatia)	Zoran Nižić	Hajduk Split	Undisclosed	
8 August 2018	MF	(Russia)	Yevgeni Kharin	Levadia Tallinn	Undisclosed	
	MF	(Russia)	Georgi Chetvergov	Lokomotiv Moscow	Undisclosed	
12 January 2019	MF	(Poland)	Damian Szymański	Wisła Płock	Undisclosed	

=== Out ===
Date	Position	Nationality	Name	To	Fee	Ref.
21 June 2018	FW	(Brazil)	Léo Jabá	PAOK	Undisclosed	
12 July 2018	MF	(Russia)	Adlan Katsayev	Anzhi Makhachkala	Undisclosed	
15 January 2019	MF	(Ivory Coast)	Idrissa Doumbia	Sporting	Undisclosed	
28 January 2019	MF	(Russia)	Chingiz Magomadov	Ural Yekaterinburg	Undisclosed	

=== Loans in ===
Date from	Position	Nationality	Name	From	Date to	Ref.
16 June 2018	DF	(Russia)	Magomed Musalov	Anzhi Makhachkala	End of Season	

=== Loans out ===
Date from	Position	Nationality	Name	To	Date to	Ref.
23 July 2018	MF	(Russia)	Roland Gigolayev	Anzhi Makhachkala	End of Season	
26 July 2018	FW	(Russia)	Apti Akhyadov	Anzhi Makhachkala	End of Season	
16 January 2019	MF	(Russia)	Ayub Batsuyev	Chayka Peschanokopskoye	End of Season	
31 January 2019	MF	(Russia)	Idris Umayev	Palanga	End of Season	
31 January 2019	FW	(Russia)	Zaur Sadayev	Ankaragücü	End of Season	

=== Released ===
Date	Position	Nationality	Name	Joined	Date
3 July 2018	DF	(Brazil)	Philipe Sampaio	Feirense	21 August 2018
27 May 2019	DF	(Brazil)	Rodolfo	Retired	
27 May 2019	DF	(Iran)	Milad Mohammadi	KAA Gent	
27 May 2019	MF	(Albania)	Bekim Balaj	Sturm Graz	26 July 2019

== Friendlies ==
23 June 2018 Friendly	(Austria) Wacker Innsbruck	2 – 0	(Russia) Akhmat Grozny	Waidring, Austria
18:30 MSK (UTC+3)	Harrer 18'; Dedić 20'	Report

26 June 2018 Friendly	Ludogorets Razgrad (Bulgaria)	3 – 1	(Russia) Akhmat Grozny	Waidring, Austria
18:30 MSK (UTC+3)	Świerczok 36', 59', 81'	Report	Mitrishev 68'

3 July 2018 Friendly	SC Schwaz (Austria)	1 – 4	(Russia) Akhmat Grozny	Waidring, Austria
19:30 MSK (UTC+3)	S.Huber 45'	Report	Roshi 33'; Balaj 37', 39'; Ismael 70'

6 July 2018 Friendly	Viktoria Plzeň (Czech Republic)	4 – 0	(Russia) Akhmat Grozny	Waidring, Austria
18:30 MSK (UTC+3)	Krmenčík 8', 31'; Kopic 44'; Procházka 58'	Report

6 July 2018 Friendly	Birmingham City (England)	0 – 1	(Russia) Akhmat Grozny	Waidring, Austria
18:30 MSK (UTC+3)		Report	Rodolfo 3'

22 January 2019 Friendly	Akhmat Grozny (Russia)	1 – 1	(Hungary) Budapest Honvéd	Belek, Turkey
11:00 MSK (UTC+3)	Mbengue 21'	Report	Ngog 19'

26 January 2019 Friendly	Akhmat Grozny (Russia)	3 – 3	(Poland) KS Cracovia	Antalya, Turkey
MSK (UTC+3)	Ismael 50'; Mbengue 74', 77'	Report	Goal

1 February 2019 Friendly	Akhmat Grozny (Russia)	1 – 2	(Bosnia and Herzegovina) Borac Banja Luka	Antalya, Turkey
MSK (UTC+3)	Balaj (pen.)	Report	Goal

1 February 2019 Friendly	Akhmat Grozny (Russia)	3 – 4	(Bulgaria) Ludogorets Razgrad	Antalya, Turkey
MSK (UTC+3)	Balaj 17'; Ravanelli 59' (pen.); Berisha 88'	Report	Abel 12'; Natanael 22'; Yankov 32'; Bakalov 41'

7 February 2019 Friendly	Akhmat Grozny (Russia)	2 – 1	(Austria) Wolfsberger AC	Antalya, Turkey
MSK (UTC+3)	Ivanov 2'; Ravanelli 11' (pen.); Semyonov (red card) 44'; Utsiyev (red card) 86'	Report	Friesenbichler 13'; Leitgeb (red card) 35'

9 February 2019 Friendly	Akhmat Grozny (Russia)	1 – 2	(South Korea) Suwon Samsung Bluewings	Antalya, Turkey
MSK (UTC+3)	Balaj 68'	Report	Waguininho 30' (red card) 69'; 37'

== Competitions ==
=== Premier League ===
==== Results by round ====
Round	1	2	3	4	5	6	7	8	9	10	11	12	13	14	15	16	17	18	19	20	21	22	23	24	25	26	27	28	29	30
Ground	A	H	A	H	A	H	A	H	A	H	A	H	A	A	H	A	H	A	H	A	H	A	H	A	H	A	H	H	A	H
Result	L	W	L	D	L	W	W	D	L	D	W	D	L	W	L	D	W	L	D	W	L	W	L	W	D	D	D	W	L	W
Position	13	8	10	12	13	9	7	8	10	9	9	9	10	8	10	11	8	8	8	8	9	9	10	9	9	9	8	7	9	8

Updated to match(es) played on 16 May 2019. Source: See Results
A = Away; H = Home; W = Win; D = Draw; L = Loss

==== Results ====
28 July 2018 1	Rostov	1 – 0	Akhmat Grozny	Rostov-on-Don
21:30 MSK (UTC+3)	Sigurðarson 45+1'	Report	Semyonov (red card) 25'	Stadium: Rostov Arena; Attendance: 27,975; Referee: Aleksey Sukhoi

5 August 2018 2	Akhmat Grozny	1 – 0	Yenisey Krasnoyarsk	Grozny
21:30 MSK (UTC+3)	Pliyev (yellow card) 52'; Ivanov 60' (yellow card) 77'; Utsiyev (yellow card) 90+3'	Report	Gasanov (yellow card) 38' (red card) 45'; Ogude (yellow card) 56'	Stadium: Akhmat-Arena; Attendance: 14,823; Referee: Aleksei Eskov

12 August 2018 3	Arsenal Tula	3 – 1	Akhmat Grozny	Tula
16:30 MSK (UTC+3)	Berkhamov (yellow card) 37' (yellow-red card) 41'; Belyayev (yellow card) 44'; Đorđević 53'; Bakayev 57'; Lesovoy 90+4'	Report	Roshi (yellow card) 23'; Ivanov 39'; Balaj (yellow card) 45'; Utsiyev (yellow card) 45+2'; Shvets (yellow card) 54'; Berisha (yellow card) 62'; Doumbia (yellow card) 90'; Mbengue (yellow card) 90+5'	Stadium: Arsenal Stadium; Attendance: 11,554; Referee: Sergey Lapochkin

18 August 2018 4	Akhmat Grozny	1 – 1	Rubin Kazan	Grozny
21:30 MSK (UTC+3)	Mbengue 90+4' (yellow card) 90+5'	Report	Konovalov (yellow card) 5'; Tsallagov (yellow card) 74'; Bayramyan 83'	Stadium: Akhmat-Arena; Attendance: 10,732; Referee: Sergey Ivanov

25 August 2018 5	Ural Yekaterinburg	2 – 1	Akhmat Grozny	Yekaterinburg
14:00 MSK (UTC+3)	Boumal (yellow card) 33'; Bicfalvi 50'; Balažic (yellow card) 75'; Dimitrov 78'	Report	Doumbia 29'; Shvets (yellow card) 32'; Ismael (yellow card) 71'	Stadium: Central Stadium; Attendance: 18,106; Referee: Aleksey Matyunin

2 September 2018 6	Akhmat Grozny	2 – 1	Ufa	Grozny
21:30 MSK (UTC+3)	Ángel (yellow card) 23'; Shvets (yellow card) 43'; Mitrishev 57', 59'; Berisha (yellow card) 90+4'	Report	Tumasyan (yellow card) 4'; Nedelcearu (yellow card) 75'; Carp 82'; Sukhov (yellow card) 88'	Stadium: Akhmat-Arena; Attendance: 10,288; Referee: Stanislav Vasilyev

16 September 2018 7	Spartak Moscow	1 – 2	Akhmat Grozny	Moscow
19:00 MSK (UTC+3)	Zobnin (yellow card) 34'; Hanni (yellow card) 38'; Dzhikiya 56'	Report	Rodolfo 20' (pen.); Berisha (yellow card) 25'; Ivanov (yellow card) 39'; Semyonov (yellow card) 42'; Gashchenkov (yellow card) 54'; Shvets 86'; Gorodov (yellow card) 90+2'	Stadium: Otkritie Arena; Attendance: 30,136; Referee: Vasily Kazartsev

22 September 2018 8	Akhmat Grozny	1 – 1	Orenburg	Grozny
19:00 MSK (UTC+3)	Ángel 22'; Doumbia (yellow card) 50'; Berisha (yellow card) 80'	Report	Popović (yellow card) 60'; Afonin (yellow card) 63' (goal) 67'; Oyewole (yellow card) 80'	Stadium: Akhmat-Arena; Attendance: 9,742; Referee: Sergey Ivanov

29 September 2018 9	Lokomotiv Moscow	2 – 0	Akhmat Grozny	Moscow
19:00 MSK (UTC+3)	Barinov (yellow card) 70'; Fernandes 81'; Idowu (yellow card) 90'; Zhemaletdinov 90+3'	Report	Semyonov (yellow card) 13'; Ángel (yellow card) 31'; Ivanov (yellow card) 54'; Ismael (yellow card) 62'	Stadium: RZD Arena; Attendance: 10,083; Referee: Evgeny Turbin

7 October 2018 10	Akhmat Grozny	0 – 0	Anzhi Makhachkala	Grozny
14:00 MSK (UTC+3)	Gashchenkov (yellow card) 21'; Berisha (yellow card) 55'; Mohammadi (yellow card) 64'	Report	Novoseltsev (yellow card) 9'; Ondoua (yellow card) 45+1'; Rabiu (yellow card) 58'; Ponce (yellow card) 68'; Glebov (yellow card) 73'	Stadium: Akhmat-Arena; Attendance: 30,597; Referee: Nikolay Voloshin

21 October 2018 11	Krasnodar	0 – 1	Akhmat Grozny	Krasnodar
19:00 MSK (UTC+3)	Spajić (yellow card) 48'; Gazinsky (yellow card) 67'; Pereyra (yellow card) 80'	Report	Rodolfo (yellow card) 36'; Gashchenkov (yellow card) 37'; Semyonov (yellow card) 42'; Ismael 60' (yellow card) 61'; Gorodov (yellow card) 87'	Stadium: Krasnodar Stadium; Attendance: 22,628; Referee: Vitali Meshkov

28 October 2018 12	Akhmat Grozny	0 – 0	Dynamo Moscow	Grozny
16:30 MSK (UTC+3)	Mohammadi (yellow card) 17'; Gashchenkov (yellow card) 70'	Report	Yevgenyev (yellow card) 40'; Morozov (yellow card) 58'	Stadium: Akhmat-Arena; Attendance: 9,324; Referee: Sergey Lapochkin

4 November 2018 13	Zenit St.Petersburg	1 – 0	Akhmat Grozny	Saint Petersburg
14:00 MSK (UTC+3)	Marchisio 32' (pen.); Paredes (yellow card) 69' (yellow-red card) 83'; Yerokhin (yellow card) 79'	Report	Ravanelli (yellow card) 20'	Stadium: Krestovsky Stadium; Attendance: 45,349; Referee: Sergei Karasev

10 November 2018 14	Krylia Sovetov	1 – 2	Akhmat Grozny	Samara
16:30 MSK (UTC+3)	Kanunnikov 69'; Chicherin (yellow card) 76'; Samardžić (yellow card) 86'; Sobolev (yellow card) 90+2'	Report	Semyonov (yellow card) 9'; Ángel (yellow card) 11'; Mohammadi (yellow card) 59'; Ravanelli 64'; Pliyev (yellow card) 66'; Ivanov 64'	Stadium: Samara Arena; Attendance: 8,697; Referee: Roman Galimov

23 November 2018 15	Akhmat Grozny	0 – 2	CSKA Moscow	Grozny
18:00 MSK (UTC+3)	Ivanov (yellow card) 35'; Ismael (yellow card) 86'	Report	Bistrović (yellow card) 5'; Magnússon 57' (yellow card) 72'; Shchennikov (yellow card) 86'; Zhamaletdinov 90+6'	Stadium: Akhmat-Arena; Attendance: 7,218; Referee: Vladislav Bezborodov

1 December 2018 16	Yenisey Krasnoyarsk	1 – 1	Akhmat Grozny	Krasnoyarsk
14:00 MSK (UTC+3)	Ogude (yellow card) 36'; Kichin 81' (pen.); Komkov (yellow card) 90+1'	Report	Semyonov (yellow card) 30'; Gashchenkov (yellow card) 33'; Mohammadi 69'; Rodolfo (yellow card) 81'	Stadium: Central Stadium; Attendance: 1,859; Referee: Vitali Meshkov

10 December 2018 17	Akhmat Grozny	2 – 0	Arsenal Tula	Grozny
19:30 MSK (UTC+3)	Semyonov (yellow card) 31'; Ravanelli 34' (yellow card) 65'; Ivanov (yellow card) 55'; Ismael (yellow card) 80'; Mbengue (yellow card) 86' (goal) 90+5'; Utsiyev (yellow card) 90+2'	Report	Kostadinov (yellow card) 4'; Bakayev (yellow card) 55'; Mirzov (yellow card) 60'; Mohammed (yellow card) 66'; Grigalava (yellow card) 76'; Gorbatenko (yellow card) 87'	Stadium: Akhmat-Arena; Attendance: 7,924; Referee: Mikhail Vilkov

2 March 2019 18	Rubin Kazan	1 – 0	Akhmat Grozny	Kazan
19:00 MSK (UTC+3)	Kambolov (yellow card) 62'; Konovalov (yellow card) 68'; Sagitov 90+4'	Report	Utsiyev (yellow card) 43'; Szymański (yellow card) 76'	Stadium: Kazan Arena; Attendance: 3,425; Referee: Vladimir Moskalyov

11 March 2019 19	Akhmat Grozny	1 – 1	Ural Yekaterinburg	Grozny
17:30 MSK (UTC+3)	Balaj 55' (pen.); Berisha (yellow card) 71'; Gorodov (yellow card) 90+1'	Report	Mohammadi 38' (o.g.); El Kabir (yellow card) 55'	Stadium: Akhmat-Arena; Attendance: 9,127; Referee: Pavel Kukuyan

17 March 2019 20	Ufa	0 – 1	Akhmat Grozny	Ufa
14:00 MSK (UTC+3)	Vaněk (yellow card) 2'; Zhivoglyadov (yellow card) 24'	Report	Ismael (yellow card) 33'; Mohammadi (yellow card) 62'; Shvets 72'	Stadium: Neftyanik Stadium; Attendance: 8,526; Referee: Vitali Meshkov

30 March 2019 21	Akhmat Grozny	1 – 3	Spartak Moscow	Grozny
16:30 MSK (UTC+3)	Semyonov (yellow card) 6' (yellow-red card) 63'; Balaj 9'; Pliyev (yellow card) 18'; Ivanov (yellow card) 77'	Report	Luiz Adriano 7' (pen.), 68'; Zé Luís (yellow card) 16'; Bocchetti (yellow card) 21'; Ayrton (yellow card) 78'; Melkadze (yellow card) 83'; Guliyev (yellow card) 90'; Glushakov 90+3'	Stadium: Akhmat-Arena; Attendance: 10,124; Referee: Sergey Lapochkin

8 April 2019 22	Orenburg	1 – 3	Akhmat Grozny	Orenburg
17:00 MSK (UTC+3)	Kozlov (yellow card) 3'; Terekhov 4'; Breyev (yellow card) 25'; Sivakow (yellow card) 60'; Popović (yellow card) 73'; Malykh (yellow card) 90+1'	Report	Ravanelli 37'; Ivanov 48'; Balaj 56'	Stadium: Gazovik Stadium; Attendance: 4,425; Referee: Vladislav Bezborodov

13 April 2019 23	Akhmat Grozny	1 – 3	Lokomotiv Moscow	Grozny
19:30 MSK (UTC+3)	Mohammadi (yellow card) 36'; Ravanelli 47' (yellow card) 81'	Report	Smolov 45+1'; Krychowiak (yellow card) 52'; Al.Miranchuk 57'; Farfán 65'; Höwedes (yellow card) 82'; Barinov (yellow card) 86'	Stadium: Akhmat-Arena; Attendance: 16,342; Referee: Nikolay Voloshin

19 April 2019 24	Anzhi Makhachkala	0 – 1	Akhmat Grozny	Kaspiysk
19:30 MSK (UTC+3)	Kulik (yellow card) 49'; Dolgov (yellow card) 67'	Report	Ivanov 77'; Semyonov (yellow card) 84'	Stadium: Anzhi Arena; Attendance: 16,342; Referee: Vitali Meshkov

24 April 2019 25	Akhmat Grozny	1 – 1	Krasnodar	Grozny
19:00 MSK (UTC+3)	Semyonov 2'; Shvets (yellow card) 63'	Report	Gazinsky (yellow card) 24'; Claesson 49' (pen.); Ignatyev (yellow card) 63'; Kaboré (yellow card) 68'; Martynovich (yellow card) 71' (yellow-red card) 90+4'	Stadium: Akhmat-Arena; Attendance: 11,997; Referee: Aleksei Eskov

27 April 2019 26	Dynamo Moscow	0 – 0	Akhmat Grozny	Khimki
19:00 MSK (UTC+3)	Tetteh (yellow card) 12'; Yusupov (yellow card) 54'; Markov (yellow card) 56'; Lutsenko (yellow card) 59'	Report	Nižić (yellow card) 90+5'	Stadium: Khimki Arena; Attendance: 4,712; Referee: Vladimir Moskalyov

4 May 2019 27	Akhmat Grozny	1 – 1	Zenit St.Petersburg	Grozny
16:30 MSK (UTC+3)	Ismael 55'; Utsiyev (yellow card) 74'	Report	Driussi 87'	Stadium: Akhmat-Arena; Attendance: 12,894; Referee: Aleksey Matyunin

11 May 2019 28	Akhmat Grozny	2 – 1	Krylia Sovetov	Grozny
16:30 MSK (UTC+3)	Mbengue 3', 42'; Shvets (yellow card) 55'; Ivanov (yellow card) 90+3'	Report	Burlak 44' (yellow card) 90+2'; Rogel (yellow card) 55'; Tkachuk (yellow card) 77'; Rabiu (yellow card) 84'	Stadium: Akhmat-Arena; Attendance: 9,962; Referee: Mikhail Vilkov

18 May 2019 29	CSKA Moscow	1 – 0	Akhmat Grozny	Moscow
16:30 MSK (UTC+3)	Vasin (yellow card) 6'; Diveyev (yellow card) 11'; Magnússon (yellow card) 50'; Chalov 64' (pen.); Sigurðsson (yellow card) 67'	Report	Pliyev (yellow card) 39'; Shvets (yellow card) 48'; Nižić (yellow card) 74'; Utsiyev (yellow card) 90+1'	Stadium: VEB Arena; Attendance: 15,813; Referee: Kirill Levnikov

26 May 2019 30	Akhmat Grozny	1 – 0	Rostov	Grozny
14:00 MSK (UTC+3)	Semyonov (yellow card) 20'; Mbengue 38'	Report	Sigurðsson (yellow card) 8'; Ionov (yellow card) 44'; Pliyev (yellow card) 48'; Glebov (yellow card) 52'; Kalachev (yellow card) 77'; Gațcan (yellow card) 83'	Stadium: Akhmat-Arena; Attendance: 8,630; Referee: Vasily Kazartsev

==== League table ====
Pos	Team	Pld	W	D	L	GF	GA	GD	Pts	Qualification or relegation
6	Arsenal Tula	30	12	10	8	40	33	+7	46	Qualification for the Europa League second qualifying round (Note: Lokomotiv Moscow won the 2018–19 Russian Cup. As they already qualified for the Champions League, the Europa League group stage spot (originally designated for the Cup winner) goes to the fourth-placed team, third qualifying round spot goes to fifth-placed team and second qualifying round spot goes to sixth-placed team.)
7	Orenburg	30	12	7	11	39	34	+5	43	
8	Akhmat Grozny	30	11	9	10	29	30	−1	42	
9	Rostov	30	10	11	9	25	23	+2	41	
10	Ural Yekaterinburg	30	10	8	12	33	45	−12	38	

Updated to match(es) played on 26 May 2019. Source: Russian Premier League, Soccerway
Rules for classification: 1) Points; 2) Head-to-head points; 3) Head-to-head matches won; 4) Head-to-head goal difference; 5) Head-to-head goals scored; 6) Head-to-head away goals; 7) Matches won; 8) Goal difference; 9) Goals scored; 10) Away goals scored; 11) Play-off.

=== Cup ===
26 September 2018 Round of 32	SKA-Khabarovsk	3 – 3 (a.e.t.) (2 – 4 p)	Akhmat Grozny	Khabarovsk
12:00 MSK (UTC+3)	Karasyov (yellow card) 12'; Trufanov (yellow card) 51'; Khomukha (yellow card) 56'; Kabaev 78'; Dedechko 87'; Sekulski (yellow card) 101'; Fadeyev (yellow card) 108'; Kvekveskiri 119' (yellow card) 120'	Report	Sadayev 26' (yellow card) 117'; Pliyev (yellow card) 57'; Musalov (yellow card) 65'; Mitrishev 85'; Balaj 109' (pen.)	Stadium: Lenin Stadium; Attendance: 3,901; Referee: Vladimir Moskalyov
	Penalties
	Khomukha (penalty scored); Sekulski (penalty missed); Dedechko (penalty missed); Kabutov (penalty scored)		Berisha (penalty scored); Gashchenkov (penalty scored); Balaj (penalty scored); Umayev (penalty scored)

31 October 2018 Round of 16	Akhmat Grozny	0 – 2	Arsenal Tula	Grozny
19:30 MSK (UTC+3)	Gashchenkov (yellow card) 23'; Ismael (yellow card) 31'; Semyonov (yellow card) 90+1'	Report	Đorđević 16'; Kostadinov (yellow card) 43'; Mirzov 70'	Stadium: Akhmat-Arena; Attendance: 9,328; Referee: Kirill Levnikov

== Squad statistics ==
As of match played 26 May 2019

=== Appearances and goals ===
No.	Pos	Nat	Player	Total		Premier League		Russian Cup	
No.	Pos	Nat	Player	Apps	Goals	Apps	Goals	Apps	Goals
2	DF	(Brazil) BRA	Rodolfo	11	1	8+3	1	0	0
3	DF	(Russia) RUS	Zaurbek Pliyev	20	0	17+2	0	1	0
4	DF	(Venezuela) VEN	Wilker Ángel	19	1	18	1	1	0
5	DF	(Russia) RUS	Magomed Musalov	6	0	4+1	0	1	0
6	MF	(Russia) RUS	Mikhail Gashchenkov	12	0	6+4	0	2	0
8	MF	(Poland) POL	Damian Szymański	9	0	8+1	0	0	0
11	MF	(Brazil) BRA	Ismael	30	2	26+3	2	1	0
13	DF	(Iran) IRI	Milad Mohammadi	30	1	28	1	2	0
14	MF	(Brazil) BRA	Ravanelli	19	4	16+1	4	2	0
15	DF	(Russia) RUS	Andrei Semyonov	28	1	27	1	1	0
16	GK	(Russia) RUS	Yevgeni Gorodov	29	0	29	0	0	0
17	FW	(Senegal) SEN	Ablaye Mbengue	26	5	10+15	5	0+1	0
18	FW	(Albania) ALB	Bekim Balaj	24	4	13+9	3	2	1
19	MF	(Russia) RUS	Oleg Ivanov	28	5	24+3	5	0+1	0
20	DF	(Croatia) CRO	Zoran Nižić	11	0	9+1	0	1	0
21	MF	(Albania) ALB	Odise Roshi	13	0	5+8	0	0	0
23	MF	(Russia) RUS	Anton Shvets	20	2	19+1	2	0	0
33	GK	(Russia) RUS	Vitali Gudiyev	3	0	1	0	2	0
40	DF	(Russia) RUS	Rizvan Utsiyev	28	0	26+1	0	1	0
59	MF	(Russia) RUS	Yevgeni Kharin	3	0	0+2	0	1	0
77	MF	(Kosovo) KOS	Bernard Berisha	22	0	12+9	0	1	0
87	MF	(Russia) RUS	Lechi Sadulayev	2	0	0+2	0	0	0
95	FW	(Russia) RUS	Magomed Mitrishev	18	3	8+8	2	1+1	1
Players away from the club on loan:
9	FW	(Russia) RUS	Zaur Sadayev	5	1	1+3	0	1	1
27	FW	(Russia) RUS	Idris Umayev	1	0	0	0	0+1	0
Players who appeared for Akhmat Grozny but left during the season:
8	MF	(Ivory Coast) CIV	Idrissa Doumbia	17	1	15+1	1	1	0

=== Goal scorers ===
Place	Position	Nation	Number	Name	Premier League	Russian Cup	Total
1	MF	(Russia)	19	Oleg Ivanov	5	0	5
1	FW	(Senegal)	17	Ablaye Mbengue	5	0	5
3	MF	(Brazil)	14	Ravanelli	4	0	4
3	FW	(Albania)	18	Bekim Balaj	3	1	4
5	FW	(Russia)	95	Magomed Mitrishev	2	1	3
6	MF	(Russia)	23	Anton Shvets	2	0	2
6	MF	(Brazil)	11	Ismael	2	0	2
8	MF	(Ivory Coast)	8	Idrissa Doumbia	1	0	1
8	DF	(Brazil)	2	Rodolfo	1	0	1
8	DF	(Venezuela)	4	Wilker Ángel	1	0	1
8	DF	(Iran)	13	Milad Mohammadi	1	0	1
8	DF	(Russia)	15	Andrei Semyonov	1	0	1
8	FW	(Russia)	9	Zaur Sadayev	0	1	1
Total					28	3	31

=== Disciplinary record ===
Number	Nation	Position	Name	Premier League		Russian Cup		Total	
Number	Nation	Position	Name	Yellow card	Red card	Yellow card	Red card	Yellow card	Red card
2	(Brazil)	DF	Rodolfo	2	0	1	0	3	0
3	(Russia)	DF	Zaurbek Pliyev	4	0	1	0	5	0
4	(Venezuela)	DF	Wilker Ángel	3	0	0	0	3	0
5	(Russia)	DF	Magomed Musalov	0	0	1	0	1	0
6	(Russia)	MF	Mikhail Gashchenkov	5	0	1	0	6	0
8	(Poland)	MF	Damian Szymański	1	0	0	0	1	0
11	(Brazil)	MF	Ismael	6	0	1	0	7	0
13	(Iran)	DF	Milad Mohammadi	5	0	0	0	5	0
14	(Brazil)	MF	Ravanelli	3	0	0	0	3	0
15	(Russia)	DF	Andrei Semyonov	10	2	1	0	11	2
16	(Russia)	GK	Yevgeni Gorodov	3	0	0	0	3	0
17	(Senegal)	FW	Ablaye Mbengue	3	0	0	0	3	0
18	(Albania)	FW	Bekim Balaj	1	0	0	0	1	0
19	(Russia)	MF	Oleg Ivanov	7	0	0	0	7	0
20	(Croatia)	DF	Zoran Nižić	2	0	0	0	2	0
21	(Albania)	MF	Odise Roshi	1	0	0	0	1	0
23	(Russia)	MF	Anton Shvets	6	0	0	0	6	0
40	(Russia)	DF	Rizvan Utsiyev	6	0	0	0	6	0
77	(Kosovo)	MF	Bernard Berisha	6	0	0	0	6	0
Players away on loan:
9	(Russia)	FW	Zaur Sadayev	0	0	1	0	1	0
Players who left Akhmat Grozny during the season:
8	(Ivory Coast)	MF	Idrissa Doumbia	2	0	0	0	2	0
Total				76	2	6	0	82	2
