= Zoran Nižić =

Croatian footballer (born 1989)

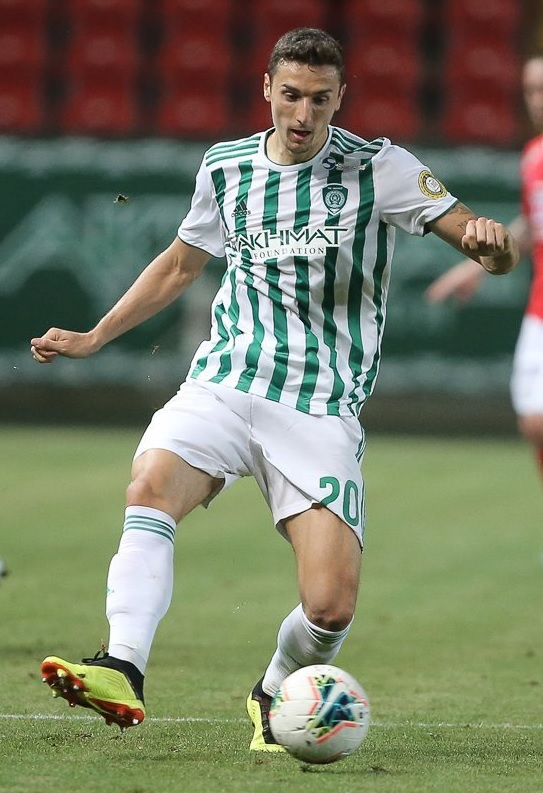
- Nižić with Akhmat Grozny in 2019

Personal information
- Date of birth: 11 October 1989 (age 37)
- Place of birth: Split, SR Croatia, Yugoslavia
- Height: 1.95 m (6 ft 5 in)
- Position: Centre back

Team information
- Current team: Dugopolje
- Number: 6

Youth career
- –2008: Zmaj Makarska

Senior career*
Years	Team	Apps	(Gls)
2008–2009	Zmaj Makarska	30	(2)
2009–2012	RWDM Brussels FC	84	(2)
2012–2018	Hajduk Split	102	(8)
2018–2023	Akhmat Grozny	86	(0)
2024–2025	Kyzylzhar	17	(1)
2025	Šibenik	4	(0)
2025–	Dugopolje	14	(1)

International career^{‡}
2017–	Croatia	2	(0)
- * Club domestic league appearances and goals as of 16 June 2026 ‡ National team caps and goals as of 2 June 2023

Zoran Nižić (Croatian pronunciation: [zǒran nǐːʒitɕ]; born 11 October 1989) is a Croatian football player who plays as centre back for Dugopolje.

== Club career ==
Nižić started his career at his hometown club HNK Zmaj Makarska, establishing himself early as a first team member at the Treća HNL Jug club. He secured himself a transfer abroad in 2009, aged just 19, to the Belgian Second Division side FC Brussels, where he would spend the next 3 seasons as a starter. After his contract ran out, Nižić returned to Croatia and trained for a few months with HNK Hajduk Split, before signing with them in late 2012. He made his league debut for Hajduk on 16 February 2013, entering the game for the injured Matej Jonjić in a 2–0 away win against NK Slaven Belupo.

In June 2018, Nižić was named in the Prva HNL team of the season for 2017–18.

In August 2018, Nižić refused to play for Hajduk in both League and European matches, allegedly due to a fever; it was later revealed that Nižić refused to play for the squad due to frustrations towards the club management and its transfer policy towards him and the players. It was also revealed that he had a confrontation with a director of Hajduk, Saša Bjelanović, in the locker room, who eventually took away his role as a captain. He was later transfer-listed by request.

On 27 August 2018, he signed a 3-year contract with the Russian Premier League club FC Akhmat Grozny. On 6 June 2023, Akhmat announced that his contract expired and will not be extended.

On 6 February 2024, Kazakhstan Premier League club Kyzylzhar announced the signing of Nižić.

On 16 October 2025, Nižić joined Croatian First Football League club Dugopolje.

== International career ==
Nižić made his debut for Croatia in a May 2017 friendly match against Mexico in Los Angeles and earned a total of 2 caps, scoring no goals. His second and final international was a March 2018 friendly, also against Mexico.

In May 2018 he was named in Croatia's preliminary 32 man squad for the 2018 World Cup in Russia but did not make the final 23.

== Career statistics ==
As of match played 16 June 2026

Club	Season	League			Cup		Continental		Total	
Club	Season	Division	Apps	Goals	Apps	Goals	Apps	Goals	Apps	Goals
Brussels	2009–10	Belgian Second Division	32	0	0	0	–		32	0
Brussels	2010–11	Belgian Second Division	29	2	0	0	–		29	2
Brussels	2011–12	Belgian Second Division	23	0	0	0	–		23	0
Brussels	Total		84	2	0	0	0	0	84	2
Hajduk Split	2012–13	Croatian First Football League	6	0	1	0	–		7	0
Hajduk Split	2013–14	Croatian First Football League	12	0	3	0	0	0	15	0
Hajduk Split	2014–15	Croatian First Football League	16	0	5	0	3	0	24	0
Hajduk Split	2015–16	Croatian First Football League	16	2	2	0	7	1	25	3
Hajduk Split	2016–17	Croatian First Football League	28	2	0	0	5	1	33	3
Hajduk Split	2017–18	Croatian First Football League	23	3	4	1	6	0	33	4
Hajduk Split	2018–19	Croatian First Football League	1	1	–		1	0	2	1
Hajduk Split	Total		102	8	15	1	22	2	139	11
Akhmat Grozny	2018–19	Russian Premier League	10	0	1	0	–		11	0
Akhmat Grozny	2019–20	Russian Premier League	21	0	1	0	–		22	0
Akhmat Grozny	2020–21	Russian Premier League	24	0	2	0	–		26	0
Akhmat Grozny	2021–22	Russian Premier League	20	0	1	0	–		21	0
Akhmat Grozny	2022–23	Russian Premier League	11	0	1	0	–		12	0
Akhmat Grozny	Total		86	0	6	0	0	0	92	0
Kyzylzhar	2024	Kazakhstan Premier League	17	0	1	0	–		18	0
Šibenik	2024–25	Croatian Football League	4	0	0	0	–		4	0
Dugopolje	2025–26	First Football League (Croatia)	14	1	0	0	–		14	1
Career total			307	11	22	1	22	2	351	14
