= Damian Szymański =

Polish footballer

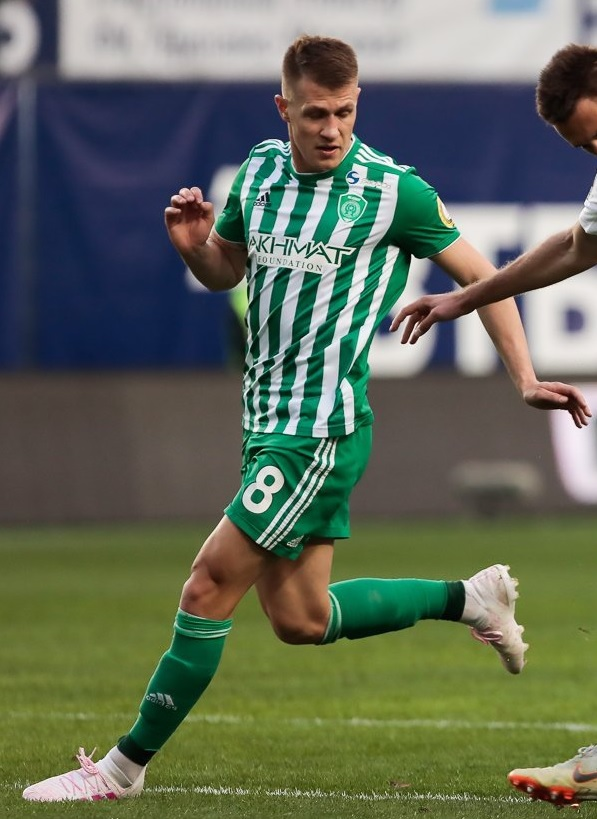
- Szymański with Akhmat Grozny in 2019

Personal information
- Full name: Damian Dawid Szymański
- Date of birth: 16 June 1995 (age 31)
- Place of birth: Kraśnik, Poland
- Height: 1.85 m (6 ft 1 in)
- Position: Midfielder

Team information
- Current team: Legia Warsaw
- Number: 4

Youth career
- MUKS Kraśnik
- –2011: Stal Kraśnik
- 2011–2012: GKS Bełchatów

Senior career*
Years	Team	Apps	(Gls)
2013–2016	GKS Bełchatów	48	(2)
2016–2017	Jagiellonia Białystok	16	(1)
2017–2019	Wisła Płock	49	(6)
2019–2020	Akhmat Grozny	13	(0)
2020	→ AEK Athens (loan)	16	(1)
2020–2025	AEK Athens	135	(9)
2025–	Legia Warsaw	25	(1)

International career^{‡}
2014	Poland U20	2	(0)
2018–2024	Poland	18	(2)
- * Club domestic league appearances and goals as of 09:59, 29 May 2026 (UTC) ‡ National team caps and goals as of 10 June 2024

Damian Dawid Szymański (born 16 June 1995) is a Polish professional footballer who plays as a midfielder for Ekstraklasa club Legia Warsaw.

== Club career ==
=== Early club career ===
Szymański started his career with GKS Bełchatów.

=== Akhmat Grozny ===
On 12 January 2019, Wisła Płock announced his transfer to the Russian Premier League club FC Akhmat Grozny. Three days later Akhmat confirmed that the club signed a 4.5-year contract with Szymański.

=== AEK Athens ===
On 13 January 2020, Szymański travelled to Athens to pass his medicals and complete a move to AEK Athens. The Polish midfielder will join the Greek club on an initial six-month loan, and AEK will maintain the right to buy him for a fee of €1,500,000. One day later, the deal was made official and Szymański was presented by his new club.

On 30 June 2020, Szymański signed a four-year contract with AEK after his transfer from Akhmat Grozny was made permanent. The Greek club paid €1,300,000 for his services, while Akhmat will keep a resale rate of 15%. Five days later, Szymanski scored his first goal for the club, sealing an emphatic 4–1 away win against Aris.

On 20 January 2021, he scored helping to a 2–0 home win against Apollon Smyrnis for the first leg of the Greek Cup round of 16. On 15 February 2021, he sealed a dramatic 4–2 away win against AEL, after a low cross from Levi García. The following week, Szymański scored a brace in a 2–2 home draw against Asteras Tripolis. On 5 December 2021, he was the only scorer in a vital 1–0 home win against rivals Panathinaikos.

At the start of the 2022–23 season, the appointment of Matías Almeyda as the club's new coach helped Damian to revive his career, eventually receiving a call-up for the 2022 World Cup. He also became the team's second captain, behind Sergio Araujo. The Argentine coach managed to harness his athleticism and passion, making him a significant member of the team, thus attracting interest from various clubs including Standard Liège.

On 20 April 2023, Szymański signed a new contract with AEK Athens, running until the summer of 2027.

=== Legia Warsaw ===
On 14 August 2025, Szymański returned to Poland to join Legia Warsaw on a four-year contract.

== International career ==
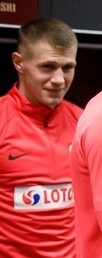
Szymański with Poland in 2019

Szymański debuted for the Polish senior squad on 7 September 2018 in a 2018–19 UEFA Nations League A game against Italy. He started for the return game against the same country on 14 October.

On 8 September 2021, Szymański scored his first goal, an equaliser in the injury time of the second half during a 1–1 2022 FIFA World Cup qualification draw against England.

Szymański was included in the 47-man preliminary squad for the 2022 FIFA World Cup. He was included in the final squad.

Szymański was included in the 29-man preliminary squad for the UEFA Euro 2024. He was included in the final squad.

== Career statistics ==
=== Club ===
As of match played 17 May 2026

Appearances and goals by club, season and competition
Club	Season	League			National cup (Note: Includes Polish Cup, Russian Cup, Greek Football Cup)		Europe		Other		Total	
Club	Season	Division	Apps	Goals	Apps	Goals	Apps	Goals	Apps	Goals	Apps	Goals
GKS Bełchatów	2013–14	I liga	19	2	1	0	—		—		20	0
GKS Bełchatów	2014–15	Ekstraklasa	19	0	2	0	—		—		21	0
GKS Bełchatów	2015–16	I liga	10	0	0	0	—		—		10	0
GKS Bełchatów	Total		48	2	3	0	—		—		51	2
Jagiellonia Białystok	2016–17	Ekstraklasa	15	1	1	0	—		—		16	1
Jagiellonia Białystok	2017–18	Ekstraklasa	1	0	—		2 (Note: Appearances in UEFA Europa League)	0	—		3	0
Jagiellonia Białystok	Total		16	1	1	0	2	0	—		19	1
Wisła Płock	2017–18	Ekstraklasa	29	4	0	0	—		—		29	4
Wisła Płock	2018–19	Ekstraklasa	20	2	3	2	—		—		23	4
Wisła Płock	Total		49	6	3	2	—		—		52	8
Akhmat Grozny	2018–19	Russian Premier League	9	0	—		—		—		9	0
Akhmat Grozny	2019–20	Russian Premier League	4	0	0	0	—		—		4	0
Akhmat Grozny	Total		13	0	0	0	—		—		13	0
AEK Athens (loan)	2019–20	Super League Greece	16	1	5	0	—		—		21	1
AEK Athens	2020–21	Super League Greece	21	3	6	1	—		—		27	4
AEK Athens	2021–22	Super League Greece	32	2	3	0	2 (Note: Appearances in UEFA Conference League)	0	—		37	2
AEK Athens	2022–23	Super League Greece	30	2	4	0	—		—		34	2
AEK Athens	2023–24	Super League Greece	26	2	1	0	10 (Note: Four appearances in UEFA Champions League, six appearances in UEFA Europa League)	0	—		37	2
AEK Athens	2024–25	Super League Greece	26	0	4	0	4	0	—		34	0
AEK Athens	Total		151	10	23	1	16	0	—		190	11
Legia Warsaw	2025–26	Ekstraklasa	25	1	1	0	4	0	—		30	1
Career total			302	20	31	3	22	0	0	0	355	23

=== International ===
As of 10 June 2024

Appearances and goals by national team and year
National team	Year	Apps	Goals
Poland	2018	4	0
Poland	2021	3	1
Poland	2022	3	0
Poland	2023	7	1
Poland	2024	1	0
Total		18	2

Scores and results list Poland's goal tally first, score column indicates score after each Szymański goal.

List of international goals scored by Damian Szymański
No.	Date	Venue	Opponent	Score	Result	Competition
1	8 September 2021	Stadion Narodowy, Warsaw, Poland	England	1–1	1–1	2022 FIFA World Cup qualification
2	24 March 2023	Fortuna Arena, Prague, Czech Republic	Czech Republic	1–3	1–3	UEFA Euro 2024 qualifying

== Honours ==
GKS Bełchatów

- I liga: 2013–14

AEK Athens

- Super League Greece: 2022–23
- Greek Cup: 2022–23
