= Ravanelli (Brazilian footballer) =

Brazilian footballer

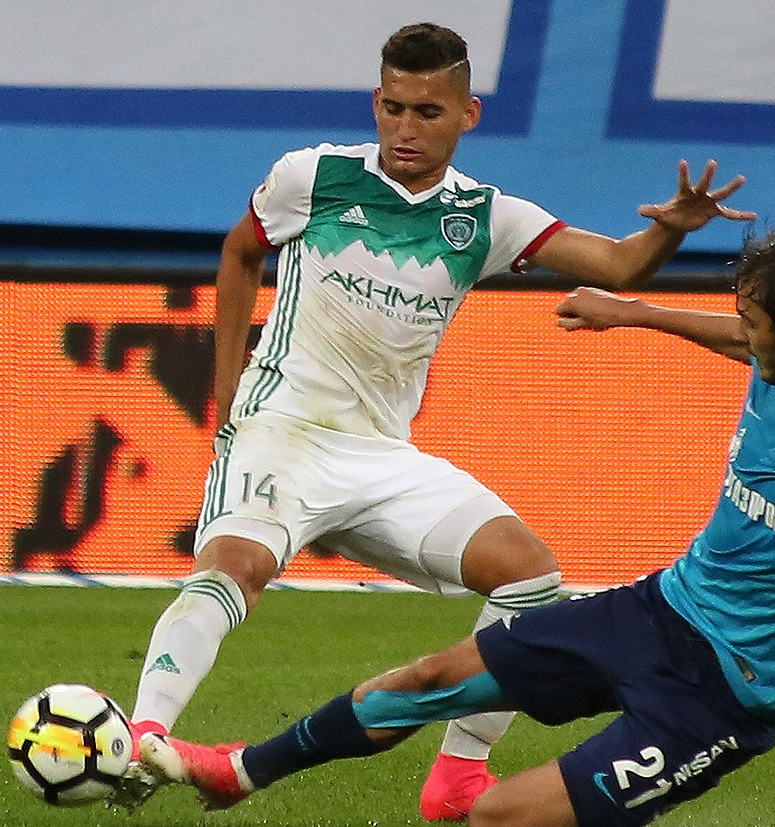
- Ravanelli with Akhmat Grozny in 2017

Personal information
- Full name: Ravanelli Ferreira dos Santos
- Date of birth: 29 August 1997 (age 29)
- Place of birth: Campinas, Brazil
- Height: 1.80 m (5 ft 11 in)
- Position: Midfielder

Team information
- Current team: Capivariano

Youth career
- 2013: Palmeirinha
- 2014–2016: Ponte Preta

Senior career*
Years	Team	Apps	(Gls)
2016–2017	Ponte Preta	41	(2)
2017–2022	Akhmat Grozny	36	(5)
2020–2021	→ Athletico Paranaense (loan)	11	(0)
2021	→ Chapecoense (loan)	27	(1)
2022	São Bernardo	8	(0)
2023	Cianorte	3	(0)
2023–2024	Pyunik	9	(0)
2024	São Bento	14	(3)
2024	Paraná	6	(1)
2025–	Capivariano	21	(1)
2025	→ Pouso Alegre (loan)	14	(2)
2026	→ Itabaiana (loan)	1	(0)
2026	→ Caxias (loan)	9	(1)

International career^{‡}
2016	Brazil U20	2	(0)
- * Club domestic league appearances and goals as of 11 November 2026 ‡ National team caps and goals as of 17 October 2016

Ravanelli Ferreira dos Santos (born 29 August 1997) is a Brazilian professional footballer who plays as an attacking midfielder or a second striker for Capivariano.

== Club career ==
=== Akhmat Grozny ===
On 20 June 2017, he signed a 4-year contract with the Russian Premier League club FC Akhmat Grozny.

==== Athletico Paranaense ====
On 12 August 2020, he joined Athletico Paranaense on loan until February 2021, with a purchase option.

==== Chapecoense ====
On 25 March 2021, he was loaned to Chapecoense until the end of 2021.

=== São Bernardo ===
On 20 January 2022, Akhmat announced Ravanelli's transfer to São Bernardo on a permanent basis. Akhmat retained 70% of the fee for his next transfer.

=== Pyunik ===
On 5 August 2023, Armenian Premier League club Pyunik announced the signing of Ravanelli.

=== Esporte Clube São Bento ===
On 11 January 2024, São Bento announced the signing of Ravanelli from Pyunik.

== Career statistics ==
As of 25 October 2021

Club	Season	League			State League		Cup		Continental		Other		Total	
Club	Season	Division	Apps	Goals	Apps	Goals	Apps	Goals	Apps	Goals	Apps	Goals	Apps	Goals
Ponte Preta	2016	Série A	14	1	5	1	4	0	—		—		23	2
Ponte Preta	2017	Série A	3	0	11	0	2	0	2 (Note: Appearance(s) in Copa Sudamericana)	0	—		18	0
Ponte Preta	Total		17	1	16	1	6	0	2	0	—		41	2
Akhmat Grozny	2017–18	Russian Premier League	12	1	—		1	0	—		—		13	1
Akhmat Grozny	2018–19	Russian Premier League	17	4	—		2	0	—		—		19	4
Akhmat Grozny	2019–20	Russian Premier League	1	0	—		1	0	—		—		2	0
Akhmat Grozny	Total		30	5	—		4	0	—		—		34	5
Athletico Paranaense (loan)	2020	Série A	11	1	—		1	0	3 (Note: Appearance(s) in Copa Libertadores)	0	—		15	1
Chapecoense (loan)	2021	Série A	15	1	10	0	2	0	—		—		27	1
Career total			73	8	28	1	11	0	5	0	0	0	117	9

== Honours ==
FC Pyunik

- Campeonato Armênio de Futebol : 2023-24

Capivariano

- Campeonato Paulista Série A2 : 2025
