= Yevgeni Gorodov =

Russian footballer

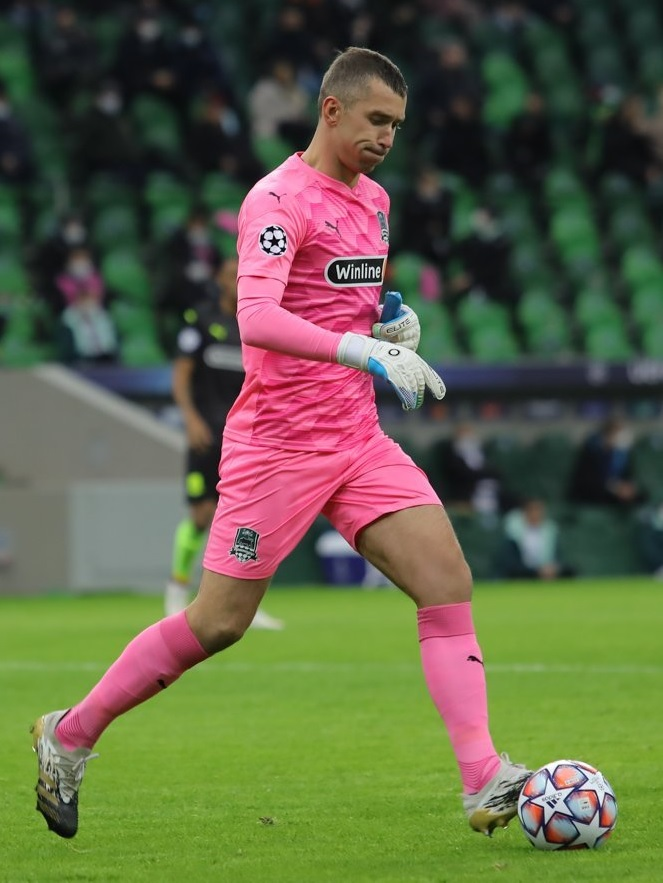
- Gorodov with FC Krasnodar in 2020

Personal information
- Full name: Yevgeni Aleksandrovich Gorodov
- Date of birth: 13 December 1985 (age 40)
- Place of birth: Barnaul, Russian SFSR
- Height: 1.89 m (6 ft 2 in)
- Position: Goalkeeper

Youth career
- 1991–2003: Dynamo Barnaul

Senior career*
Years	Team	Apps	(Gls)
2004–2005	Dynamo Barnaul	11	(0)
2006–2010	Tom Tomsk	0	(0)
2008	→ Dynamo Barnaul (loan)	16	(0)
2009	→ Chita (loan)	24	(0)
2010	→ Shinnik Yaroslavl (loan)	38	(0)
2011–2013	Krasnodar	23	(0)
2013–2020	Akhmat Grozny	137	(0)
2020–2022	Krasnodar	5	(0)
- * Club domestic league appearances and goals

Yevgeni Aleksandrovich Gorodov (Russian: Евгений Александрович Городов; born 13 December 1985) is a Russian former professional football player. He played as a goalkeeper.

== Club career ==
On 5 August 2020, he returned to FC Krasnodar and signed a two-year contract. He left Krasnodar as his contract expired in May 2022.

== Career statistics ==
=== Club ===
As of 21 May 2022

Club	Season	League			Cup		Continental		Total	
Club	Season	Division	Apps	Goals	Apps	Goals	Apps	Goals	Apps	Goals
Dynamo Barnaul	2004	PFL	1	0	0	0	–		1	0
Dynamo Barnaul	2005	PFL	10	0	2	0	–		12	0
Tom Tomsk	2006	Russian Premier League	0	0	1	0	–		1	0
Tom Tomsk	2007	Russian Premier League	0	0	0	0	–		0	0
Tom Tomsk	Total		0	0	1	0	0	0	1	0
Dynamo Barnaul	2008	FNL	16	0	0	0	–		16	0
Dynamo Barnaul	Total		27	0	2	0	0	0	29	0
Chita	2009	FNL	24	0	0	0	–		24	0
Shinnik Yaroslavl	2010	FNL	38	0	1	0	–		39	0
Krasnodar	2011–12	Russian Premier League	23	0	3	0	–		26	0
Krasnodar	2012–13	Russian Premier League	0	0	0	0	–		0	0
Akhmat Grozny	2013–14	Russian Premier League	11	0	0	0	–		11	0
Akhmat Grozny	2014–15	Russian Premier League	2	0	1	0	–		3	0
Akhmat Grozny	2015–16	Russian Premier League	22	0	2	0	–		24	0
Akhmat Grozny	2016–17	Russian Premier League	28	0	2	0	–		30	0
Akhmat Grozny	2017–18	Russian Premier League	20	0	1	0	–		21	0
Akhmat Grozny	2018–19	Russian Premier League	29	0	0	0	–		29	0
Akhmat Grozny	2019–20	Russian Premier League	25	0	3	0	–		28	0
Akhmat Grozny	Total		137	0	9	0	0	0	146	0
Krasnodar	2020–21	Russian Premier League	4	0	1	0	3	0	8	0
Krasnodar	2021–22	Russian Premier League	1	0	0	0	–		1	0
Krasnodar	Total		28	0	4	0	3	0	35	0
Career total			254	0	17	0	3	0	274	0
