= Andrei Semyonov (footballer, born 1989) =

Russian footballer

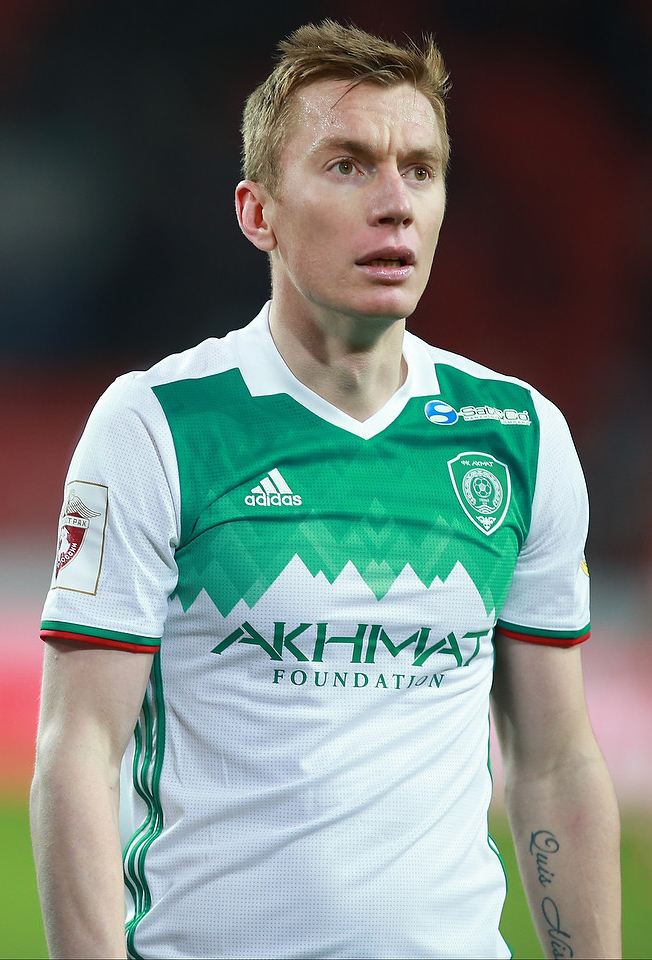
- Semyonov with Akhmat Grozny in 2018

Personal information
- Full name: Andrei Sergeyevich Semyonov
- Date of birth: 24 March 1989 (age 37)
- Place of birth: Moscow, Russian SFSR, Soviet Union
- Height: 1.91 m (6 ft 3 in)
- Position: Centre-back

Youth career
- Torpedo-ZIL Moscow
- 2006–2008: Spartak Moscow

Senior career*
Years	Team	Apps	(Gls)
2008	Sokol Saratov	7	(0)
2008	Istra	17	(0)
2009	Nosta Novotroitsk	9	(0)
2009–2012	SKA-Energiya Khabarovsk	71	(2)
2012–2013	Amkar Perm	22	(1)
2014–2024	Akhmat Grozny	264	(7)

International career
2008	Russia U-19	1	(0)
2014–2021	Russia	27	(0)
- * Club domestic league appearances and goals

Andrei Sergeyevich Semyonov (Russian: Андрей Серге́евич Семёнов, IPA: [ɐnˈdrʲej sʲɪrˈɡʲe(j)ɪvʲɪtɕ sʲɪˈmʲɵnəf]; born 24 March 1989) is a Russian former professional footballer who played as a centre-back.

== Club career ==
=== Amkar ===
He made his Russian Premier League debut for Amkar Perm on 25 November 2012 in a game against Anzhi Makhachkala and scored a goal in that game (Amkar lost 1–2).

=== Akhmat Grozny ===
On 4 February 2014, Amkar announced Semyonov's transfer to RFPL rivals Terek Grozny.

On 19 May 2019, Semyonov extended his contract with Akhmat Grozny until the summer of 2022. On 14 June 2022, Semyonov signed a new two-year contract with Akhmat.

On 29 May 2024, Semyonov left Akhmat as his contract expired.

== International ==
He made his debut for the Russia national football team on 31 May 2014 in a friendly against Norway.

On 2 June 2014, he was included in the Russia's 2014 FIFA World Cup squad. He remained on the bench in all Russia's games at the World Cup.

On 11 May 2018, he was included in Russia's extended 2018 FIFA World Cup squad. On 3 June 2018, he was included in the final World Cup squad, but once again he did not make any appearances for the squad in the tournament.

On 11 May 2021, he was included in the preliminary extended 30-man squad for UEFA Euro 2020. On 2 June 2021, he was included in the final squad. He played the full match in Russia's opening game against Belgium on 12 June 2021, making his major tournament debut as Russia lost 0–3. His mistake while clearing the ball led to Romelu Lukaku's opening goal in the 10th minute. He did not appear in two remaining games as Russia was eliminated at group stage.

== Career statistics ==
=== Club ===
As of match played 25 May 2024

Club	Season	League			Cup		Continental		Total	
Club	Season	Division	Apps	Goals	Apps	Goals	Apps	Goals	Apps	Goals
Sokol Saratov	2008	Russian Second League	7	0	1	0	–		8	0
Istra	2008	Russian Second League	17	0	0	0	–		17	0
Nosta Novotroitsk	2009	Russian First League	9	0	0	0	–		9	0
SKA-Energia Khabarovsk	2009	Russian First League	2	0	0	0	–		2	0
SKA-Energia Khabarovsk	2010	Russian First League	29	0	0	0	–		29	0
SKA-Energia Khabarovsk	2011–12	Russian First League	40	2	1	0	–		41	2
SKA-Energia Khabarovsk	Total		71	2	1	0	0	0	72	2
Amkar Perm	2012–13	Russian Premier League	9	1	1	0	–		10	1
Amkar Perm	2013–14	Russian Premier League	13	0	1	0	–		14	0
Amkar Perm	Total		22	1	2	0	0	0	24	1
Akhmat Grozny	2013–14	Russian Premier League	11	1	2	0	–		13	1
Akhmat Grozny	2014–15	Russian Premier League	29	1	1	0	–		30	1
Akhmat Grozny	2015–16	Russian Premier League	29	0	3	0	–		32	0
Akhmat Grozny	2016–17	Russian Premier League	28	0	2	0	–		30	0
Akhmat Grozny	2017–18	Russian Premier League	28	0	1	0	–		29	0
Akhmat Grozny	2018–19	Russian Premier League	27	1	1	0	–		28	1
Akhmat Grozny	2019–20	Russian Premier League	30	1	2	0	–		32	1
Akhmat Grozny	2020–21	Russian Premier League	18	2	5	0	–		23	2
Akhmat Grozny	2021–22	Russian Premier League	27	0	0	0	–		27	0
Akhmat Grozny	2022–23	Russian Premier League	19	0	5	0	–		24	0
Akhmat Grozny	2023–24	Russian Premier League	18	1	3	1	–		21	2
Akhmat Grozny	Total		264	7	25	1	0	0	289	8
Career total			390	10	29	1	0	0	419	11

=== International ===
Statistics accurate as of match played 15 November 2020.

Russia
Year	Apps	Goals
2014	2	0
2015	1	0
2016	2	0
2017	1	0
2018	2	0
2019	8	0
2020	5	0
Total	21	0
