= Bernard Berisha =

Kosovar footballer (born 1991)

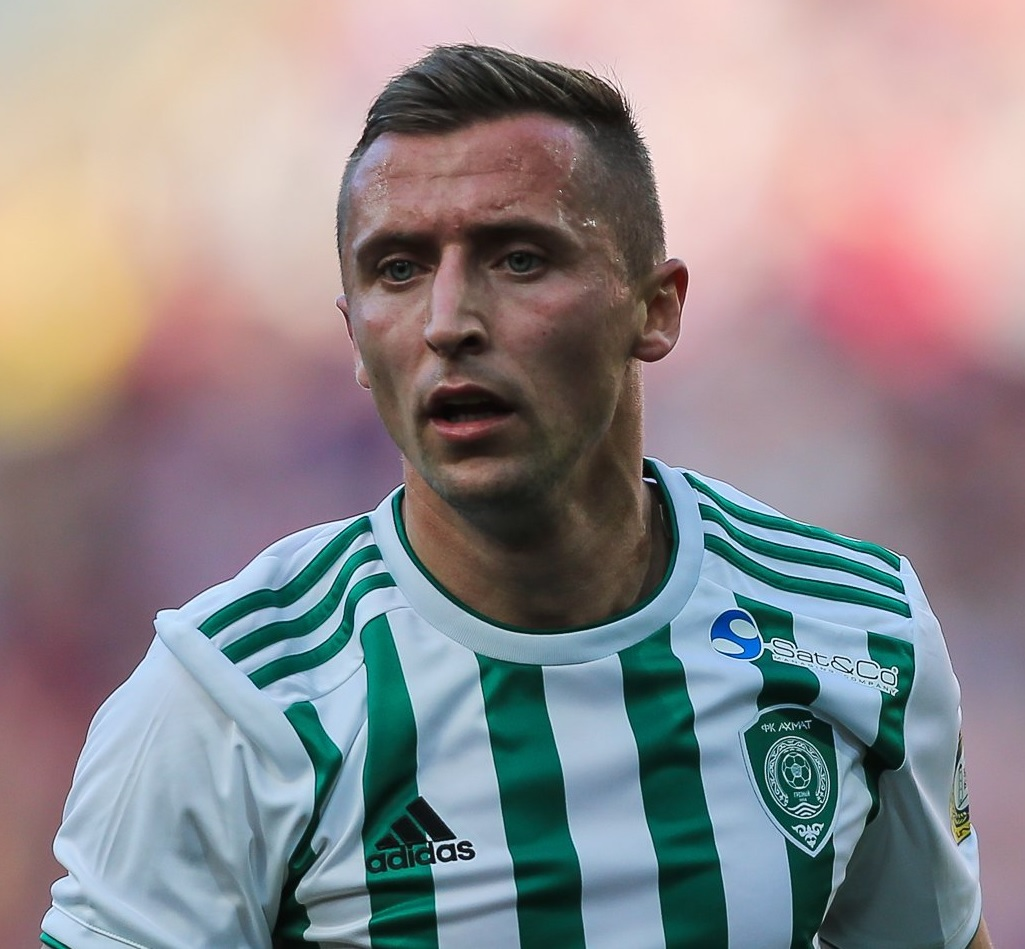
- Berisha with Akhmat Grozny in 2019

Personal information
- Date of birth: 24 October 1991 (age 35)
- Place of birth: Peja, SFR Yugoslavia (now Kosovo)
- Height: 1.65 m (5 ft 5 in)
- Position: Midfielder

Team information
- Current team: Tirana
- Number: 8

Senior career*
Years	Team	Apps	(Gls)
2010–2012	Besa Pejë	44	(10)
2012–2014	Besa Kavajë	49	(6)
2014–2016	Skënderbeu Korçë	47	(8)
2016–2017	Anzhi Makhachkala	28	(4)
2017–2025	Akhmat Grozny	173	(22)
2025–2026	Dinamo City	28	(0)
2026–	Tirana	7	(0)

International career^{‡}
2015–	Kosovo	27	(1)
- * Club domestic league appearances and goals as of 25 June 2026 ‡ National team caps and goals as of 5 June 2024

Bernard Berisha (born 24 October 1991) is a Kosovar professional footballer who plays as a left winger or attacking midfielder for Albanian club Tirana and the Kosovo national team.

== Club career ==
=== Skënderbeu Korçë ===
Berisha followed Fatjon Sefa from Besa Kavajë to reigning Albanian champions Skënderbeu Korçë, where he agreed a one-year contract with the club president Ardian Takaj on 27 May 2014. He made his debut with Skënderbeu in the second leg of the 2014–15 UEFA Champions League second qualifying round against Belarusian side BATE Borisov. Berisha was in the starting lineup but was replaced in the 60th minute by Andi Ribaj in the 1–1 draw, which saw BATE Borisov go through on away goals after a goalless first leg. He won the Albanian Supercup in his next game with the club, coming on at half time for fellow Kosovo Albanian Leonit Abazi at half time in the 1–0 win over Flamurtari Vlorë.

On 23 August 2014, Berisha made his Kategoria Superiore debut with Skënderbeu at Qemal Stafa Stadium, playing the entire match against the newly promoted club Elbasani, helping the team to win the match 1–0. His Albanian Cup debut would come later, in October against Himara, playing in two legged match, scoring a goal in each of them, with Skënderbeu who passed the round with the aggregate 20–1.

He renewed his contract with Skënderbeu Korçë at the end of the 2014–15 season, signing a new two–year deal to keep him at the club until 2017.

=== Anzhi Makhachkala ===
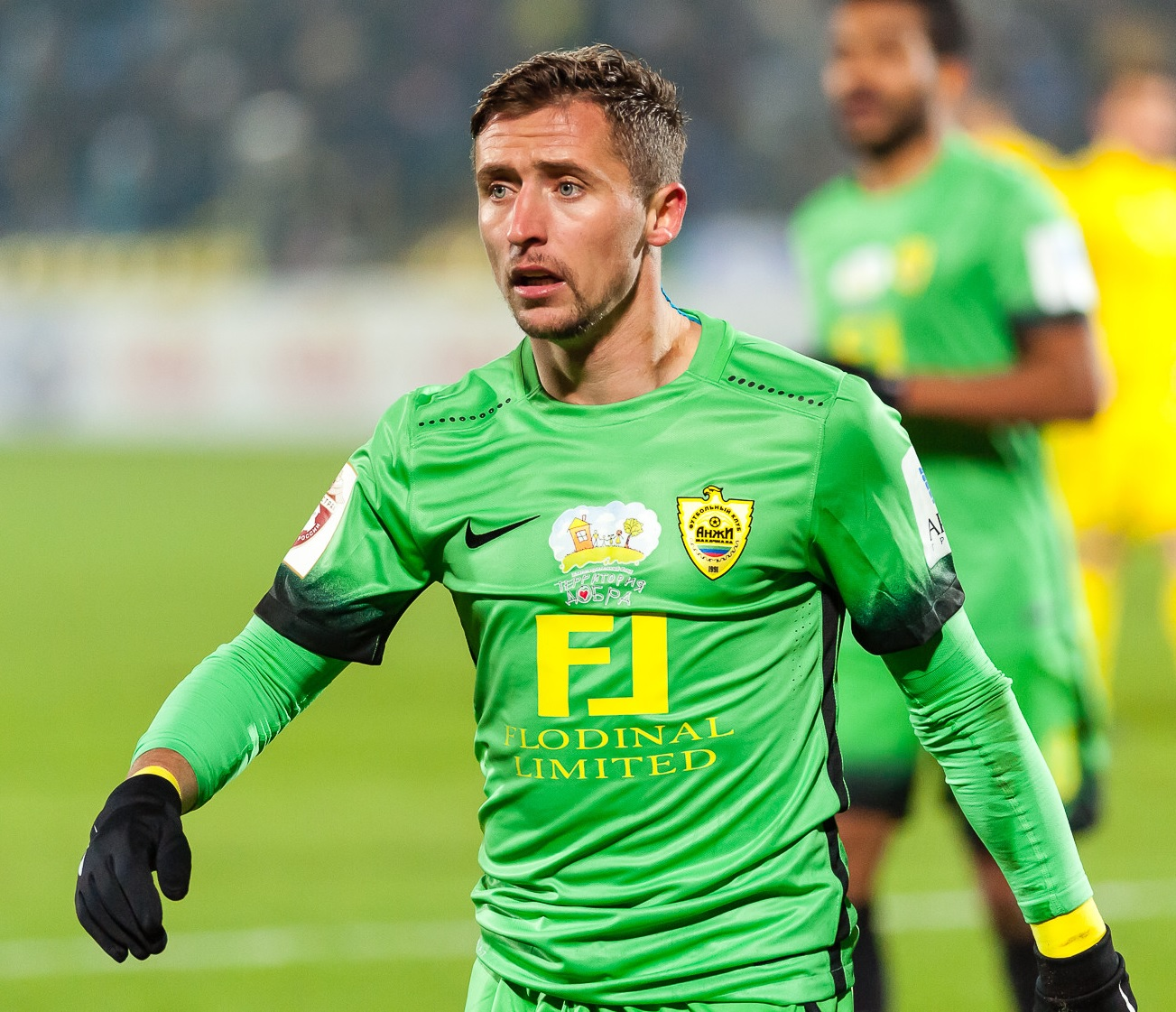
Berisha with Anzhi Makhachkala in 2016

On 13 January 2016, Berisha joined the Russian Premier League side Anzhi Makhachkala, on a 3.5-year contract with Anzhi Makhachkala paying a fee of €600.000 to Skënderbeu Korçë. As Russia does not recognize Kosovo as an independent state, he is registered with the Russian league as an Albanian citizen. The club's website, however, states that Berisha is a Kosovo national team footballer.

=== Terek/Akhmat Grozny ===
On 26 December 2016, Berisha agreed to join Russian Premier League side Terek Grozny on a 3.5-year contract, there he will play alongside Albania internationals Bekim Balaj and Odise Roshi respectively. On 4 January 2017, the contract was finalized and signed.

On 9 August 2022, Berisha extended his contract with the club (since renamed to Akhmat Grozny) until 2025. On 12 August 2024, he extended it once again to June 2027.

On 17 July 2025, Berisha's contract with Akhmat was terminated by mutual consent, after 8.5 seasons at the club.

== International career ==
On 7 October 2015. Berisha received a call-up from Kosovo for the friendly match against Equatorial Guinea, and made his debut after being named in the starting line-up.

== Career statistics ==
=== Club ===
As of match played 24 May 2025

Appearances and goals by club, season and competition
Club	Season	League			Cup		Europe		Other		Total	
Club	Season	Division	Apps	Goals	Apps	Goals	Apps	Goals	Apps	Goals	Apps	Goals
Besa Kavajë	2012–13	Kategoria Superiore	21	3	2	0	—		—		23	3
Besa Kavajë	2013–14	Kategoria Superiore	28	3	1	1	—		—		29	4
Besa Kavajë	Total		49	6	3	1	0	0	0	0	52	7
Skënderbeu Korçë	2014–15	Kategoria Superiore	32	4	7	3	1 (Note: Appearance(s) in UEFA Champions League)	0	1 (Note: Appearance in Albanian Supercup)	0	41	7
Skënderbeu Korçë	2015–16	Kategoria Superiore	17	4	1	0	12 (Note: Six appearances and two goals in UEFA Champions League, six in UEFA Europa League)	2	1	0	31	6
Skënderbeu Korçë	Total		49	8	8	3	13	2	2	0	72	13
Anzhi Makhachkala	2015–16	Russian Premier League	11	1	0	0	—		2 (Note: Two appearances in the Russian Premier League Relegation play-offs)	0	13	1
Anzhi Makhachkala	2016–17	Russian Premier League	17	3	2	1	—		0	0	19	4
Anzhi Makhachkala	Total		28	4	2	1	0	0	2	0	32	5
Akhmat Grozny	2016–17	Russian Premier League	8	1	0	0	—		—		8	1
Akhmat Grozny	2017–18	Russian Premier League	23	1	1	0	—		—		24	1
Akhmat Grozny	2018–19	Russian Premier League	21	0	1	0	—		—		22	0
Akhmat Grozny	2019–20	Russian Premier League	22	3	3	1	—		—		25	4
Akhmat Grozny	2020–21	Russian Premier League	27	8	4	1	—		—		31	9
Akhmat Grozny	2021–22	Russian Premier League	13	1	0	0	—		—		13	1
Akhmat Grozny	2022–23	Russian Premier League	20	5	7	0	—		—		27	5
Akhmat Grozny	2023–24	Russian Premier League	26	3	6	0	—		—		32	3
Akhmat Grozny	2024–25	Russian Premier League	13	0	4	2	—		—		17	2
Akhmat Grozny	Total		173	22	26	4	0	0	0	0	199	26
Career total			299	40	39	9	13	2	4	0	355	51

=== International ===
As of 6 September 2020

Appearances and goals by national team and year
National team	Year	Apps	Goals
Kosovo	2015	2	0
Kosovo	2016	4	0
Kosovo	2017	5	0
Kosovo	2018	2	0
Kosovo	2019	2	0
Kosovo	2020	1	1
Total		16	1

Scores and results list goal tally first.
Scores and results list Kosovo's goal tally first, score column indicates score after each Berisha goal.

List of international goals scored by Bernard Berisha
No.	Date	Venue	Opponent	Score	Result	Competition
1	6 September 2020	Fadil Vokrri Stadium, Pristina, Kosovo	Greece	1–2	1–2	2020–21 UEFA Nations League C

== Honours ==
Skënderbeu Korçë

- Kategoria Superiore: 2014–15
- Albanian Supercup: 2014
