= Ismael Silva (footballer) =

Brazilian footballer (born 1994)

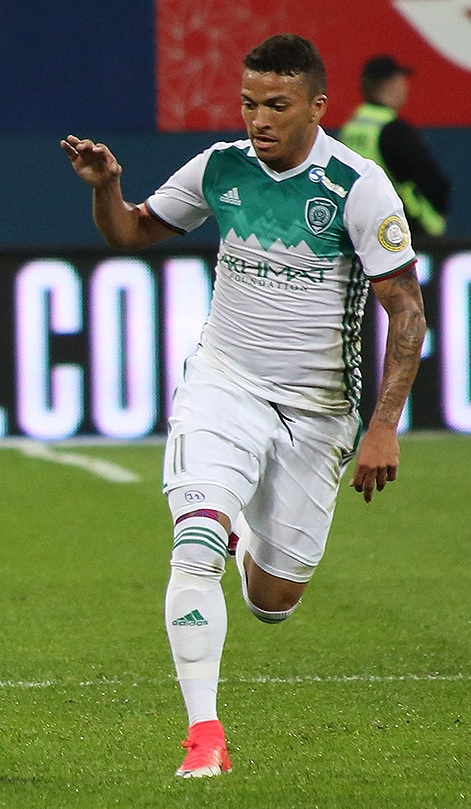
- Ismael Silva with Akhmat in 2017

Personal information
- Full name: Ismael Silva Lima
- Date of birth: 1 December 1994 (age 31)
- Place of birth: Fortaleza, Brazil
- Height: 1.69 m (5 ft 7 in)
- Position: Midfielder

Team information
- Current team: Akhmat Grozny
- Number: 11

Youth career
- Ferroviário AC
- Crateús

Senior career*
Years	Team	Apps	(Gls)
2012	Crateús	9	(0)
2013–2017	Kalmar FF	106	(6)
2017–2021	Akhmat Grozny	108	(7)
2021–2023	Al Faisaly	27	(1)
2024–	Akhmat Grozny	66	(1)
- * Club domestic league appearances and goals as of 21 November 2026

Ismael Silva Lima (born 1 December 1994), sometimes known as just Ismael, is a Brazilian footballer who plays as a central midfielder for Russian club Akhmat Grozny.

== Club career ==
On 9 August 2017, he moved from Kalmar FF to the Russian Premier League club FC Akhmat Grozny.

On 17 May 2021, Akhmat Grozny announced that Ismael Silva had left the club after 114 games for the club.

On 25 July 2021, he signed with Al Faisaly in Saudi Arabia.

After not playing for two years, on 29 July 2024 Ismael Silva returned to Akhmat Grozny. On 18 May 2026, Silva extended his contract with Akhmat for one season, with an optional second season.

== Career statistics ==
=== Club ===
As of match played 21 November 2026

Appearances and goals by club, season and competition
Club	Season	League			State League		National cup		Continental		Other		Total	
Club	Season	Division	Apps	Goals	Apps	Goals	Apps	Goals	Apps	Goals	Apps	Goals	Apps	Goals
Crateús	2012	N/A	—		9	0	—		—		—		9	0
Kalmar	2013	Allsvenskan	24	3	—		2	0	—		—		26	3
Kalmar	2014	Allsvenskan	19	0	—		0	0	—		—		19	0
Kalmar	2015	Allsvenskan	27	1	—		1	0	—		—		28	1
Kalmar	2016	Allsvenskan	29	2	—		5	0	—		—		34	2
Kalmar	2017	Allsvenskan	7	0	—		1	0	—		—		8	0
Kalmar	Total		106	6	—		9	0	—		—		115	6
Akhmat Grozny	2017–18	Russian Premier League	24	3	—		1	0	—		—		25	3
Akhmat Grozny	2018–19	Russian Premier League	29	2	—		1	0	—		—		30	2
Akhmat Grozny	2019–20	Russian Premier League	29	1	—		2	0	—		—		31	1
Akhmat Grozny	2020–21	Russian Premier League	26	1	—		2	0	—		—		28	1
Akhmat Grozny	Total		108	7	—		6	0	—		—		114	7
Al-Faisaly	2021–22	Saudi Pro League	27	1	—		1	0	6 (Note: Appearances in AFC Champions League)	0	1 (Note: Appearance in Saudi Super Cup)	0	35	1
Akhmat Grozny	2024–25	Russian Premier League	25	0	—		6	0	—		2 (Note: Appearance in relegation play-offs)	0	33	0
Akhmat Grozny	2025–26	Russian Premier League	26	1	—		5	0	—		—		31	1
Akhmat Grozny	2026–27	Russian Premier League	15	0	—		5	0	—		—		20	0
Akhmat Grozny	Total		66	1	0	0	16	0	—		2	0	84	1
Akhmat Grozny	Club total		174	8	0	0	22	0	—		2	0	198	8
Career total			307	15	9	0	32	0	6	0	3	0	357	15
