= Apti Akhyadov =

Russian footballer

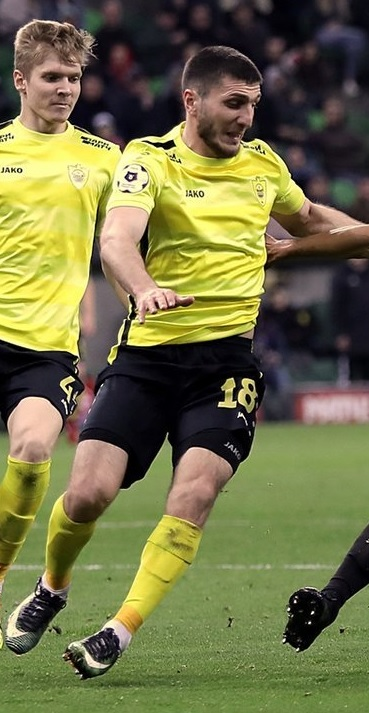
- Akhyadov with Anzhi Makhachkala in 2019

Personal information
- Full name: Apti Movlidovich Akhyadov
- Date of birth: 24 August 1993 (age 33)
- Place of birth: Gudermes, Russia
- Height: 1.75 m (5 ft 9 in)
- Position: Forward

Senior career*
Years	Team	Apps	(Gls)
2011–2020	FC Akhmat Grozny	4	(0)
2013–2016	→ FC Terek-2 Grozny	25	(11)
2016–2017	→ PFC Spartak Nalchik (loan)	28	(1)
2018–2019	→ FC Anzhi Makhachkala (loan)	22	(0)
2019	→ FC Chayka Peschanokopskoye (loan)	7	(0)
2020	FC Tom Tomsk	8	(0)
2021	FC Kyran	1	(0)
2021	FC Legion Dynamo Makhachkala	1	(0)

International career
2011	Russia U-18	5	(0)
- * Club domestic league appearances and goals

Apti Movlidovich Akhyadov (Russian: Апти Мовлидович Ахъядов; born 24 August 1993) is a Russian former footballer. He played as a striker or right midfielder.

== Career ==
Akhyadov made his professional debut for FC Terek Grozny on 13 July 2010 in the Russian Cup game against FC Luch-Energiya Vladivostok. He made his Russian Football Premier League on 21 August 2015 for FC Terek Grozny in a game against FC Dynamo Moscow.

On 26 July 2018, he joined FC Anzhi Makhachkala on loan for the 2018–19 season.

On 2 July 2019, he joined FC Chayka Peschanokopskoye on loan. The loan was terminated by mutual consent on 19 August 2019.

On 23 January 2020 he signed a 1.5-year contract with FC Tom Tomsk.

== Career statistics ==
=== Club ===
As of 13 May 2018

Club	Season	League			Cup		Continental		Total	
Club	Season	Division	Apps	Goals	Apps	Goals	Apps	Goals	Apps	Goals
FC Akhmat Grozny	2010	Russian Premier League	0	0	1	0	–		1	0
FC Akhmat Grozny	2011–12	Russian Premier League	0	0	0	0	–		0	0
FC Akhmat Grozny	2012–13	Russian Premier League	0	0	0	0	–		0	0
FC Akhmat Grozny	2013–14	Russian Premier League	0	0	0	0	–		0	0
FC Akhmat Grozny	2014–15	Russian Premier League	0	0	0	0	–		0	0
FC Akhmat Grozny	2015–16	Russian Premier League	1	0	1	0	–		2	0
FC Akhmat Grozny	2016–17	Russian Premier League	0	0	–		–		0	0
FC Terek-2 Grozny	2013–14	PFL	19	7	–		–		19	7
FC Terek-2 Grozny	2014–15	PFL	1	1	–		–		1	1
FC Terek-2 Grozny	2015–16	PFL	5	3	–		–		5	3
FC Terek-2 Grozny	Total		25	11	0	0	0	0	25	11
PFC Spartak Nalchik	2016–17	FNL	28	1	0	0	–		28	1
FC Akhmat Grozny	2017–18	Russian Premier League	3	0	0	0	–		3	0
FC Akhmat Grozny	Total (2 spells)		4	0	2	0	0	0	6	0
Career total			57	12	2	0	0	0	59	12
