= Andrés Ponce =

Venezuelan footballer (born 1996)

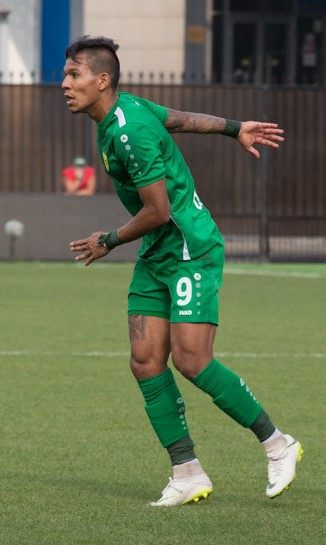
- Ponce with Anzhi Makhachkala in 2018

Personal information
- Full name: Andrés Fabián Ponce Núñez
- Date of birth: 11 November 1996 (age 30)
- Place of birth: Maracaibo, Venezuela
- Height: 1.81 m (5 ft 11 in)
- Position: Striker

Team information
- Current team: Academia Puerto Cabello

Youth career
- 2007–2013: FundaUAM

Senior career*
Years	Team	Apps	(Gls)
2013	Deportivo Táchira	10	(0)
2014	→ Llaneros (loan)	9	(2)
2015–2018	Sampdoria	1	(0)
2015	→ Olhanense (loan)	17	(1)
2016–2017	→ Lugano (loan)	8	(0)
2017	→ Livorno (loan)	8	(1)
2018	→ Feralpisalò (loan)	11	(0)
2018–2019	Anzhi Makhachkala	27	(5)
2019–2021	Akhmat Grozny	29	(3)
2020–2021	→ Rotor Volgograd (loan)	14	(2)
2021–2023	Vejle	53	(8)
2023–2024	Akron Tolyatti	47	(14)
2024–2025	Atlético Bucaramanga	28	(2)
2025–	Academia Puerto Cabello	1	(0)

International career^{‡}
2013	Venezuela U17	8	(7)
2016–	Venezuela	8	(1)
- * Club domestic league appearances and goals as of 29 August 2024 ‡ National team caps and goals as of 19:55, 10 October 2020 (UTC)

Andrés Fabián Ponce Núñez (born 11 November 1996) is a Venezuelan professional footballer who plays as a striker for Academia Puerto Cabello.

== Career ==
=== Club ===
On 27 July 2018, Ponce signed with the Russian Premier League club Anzhi Makhachkala.

On 4 June 2019, Ponce signed a 4-year contract with another Russian Premier League club Akhmat Grozny. On 16 October 2020, he was loaned to Rotor Volgograd. On 7 August 2021, his contract with Akhmat was terminated by mutual consent.

On 31 August 2021, he joined Danish club Vejle. On 29 January 2023, Vejle confirmed that Ponce's contract had been terminated by mutual agreement. Later on the same day, he signed with Russian First League club Akron Tolyatti. Ponce left Akron on 14 June 2024, as his contract expired.

=== International ===
Ponce rose recognition for his performance in the 2013 South American U-17 Championship, in which he scored seven goals and helped to his nation to fit a spot in the upcoming 2013 FIFA U-17 World Cup.

== Career statistics ==
=== Club ===
As of 1 June 2024

Club	Season	League			Cup		Continental		Other		Total	
Club	Season	Division	Apps	Goals	Apps	Goals	Apps	Goals	Apps	Goals	Apps	Goals
Deportivo Táchira	2012–13	Venezuelan Primera División	7	0	0	0	–		–		7	0
Deportivo Táchira	2013–14	Venezuelan Primera División	3	0	0	0	–		–		3	0
Deportivo Táchira	Total		10	0	0	0	0	0	0	0	10	0
Llaneros (loan)	2014–15	Venezuelan Primera División	9	2	0	0	–		–		9	2
Sampdoria	2015–16	Serie A	1	0	0	0	–		–		1	0
Olhanense (loan)	2014–15	Liga Portugal 2	13	1	–		–		–		13	1
Olhanense (loan)	2015–16	Liga Portugal 2	4	0	–		–		1 (Note: Appearance in Taça da Liga)	0	5	0
Olhanense (loan)	Total		17	1	0	0	0	0	1	0	18	1
Lugano (loan)	2016–17	Swiss Super League	8	0	2	3	–		–		10	3
Livorno (loan)	2017–18	Serie C	8	1	1	0	–		2 (Note: Appearances in Coppa Italia Serie C)	0	11	1
Feralpisalò (loan)	2017–18	Serie C	11	0	–		–		1 (Note: Appearances in the promotion play-offs)	0	12	0
Anzhi Makhachkala	2018–19	Russian Premier League	27	5	1	0	–		–		28	5
Akhmat Grozny	2019–20	Russian Premier League	20	3	1	0	–		–		21	3
Akhmat Grozny	2020–21	Russian Premier League	9	0	1	0	–		–		10	0
Akhmat Grozny	2021–22	Russian Premier League	0	0	–		–		–		0	0
Akhmat Grozny	Total		29	3	2	0	0	0	0	0	31	3
Rotor Volgograd (loan)	2020–21	Russian Premier League	14	2	1	0	–		–		15	2
Vejle	2021–22	Danish Superliga	25	1	7	2	–		–		32	3
Vejle	2022–23	Danish 1st Division	17	3	4	2	–		–		21	5
Vejle	Total		42	4	11	4	0	0	0	0	53	8
Akron Tolyatti	2022–23	Russian First League	14	8	5	1	–		–		19	9
Akron Tolyatti	2023–24	Russian First League	33	6	3	2	–		2	1	38	9
Akron Tolyatti	Total		47	14	8	3	0	0	2	1	57	18
Career total			223	32	26	10	0	0	6	1	255	43

=== International goals ===
Scores and results list Venezuela's goal tally first.

No.	Date	Venue	Opponent	Score	Result	Competition
1.	16 October 2018	Estadi Olímpic Lluís Companys, Barcelona, Spain	United Arab Emirates	2–0	2–0	Friendly

== Honours ==
=== Individual ===
- Miglior Marcatore Del Campionato Primavera Tim: 2015–16.

=== National ===
Venezuela

- Kirin Cup:2019
