= Mikhail Gashchenkov =

Russian footballer

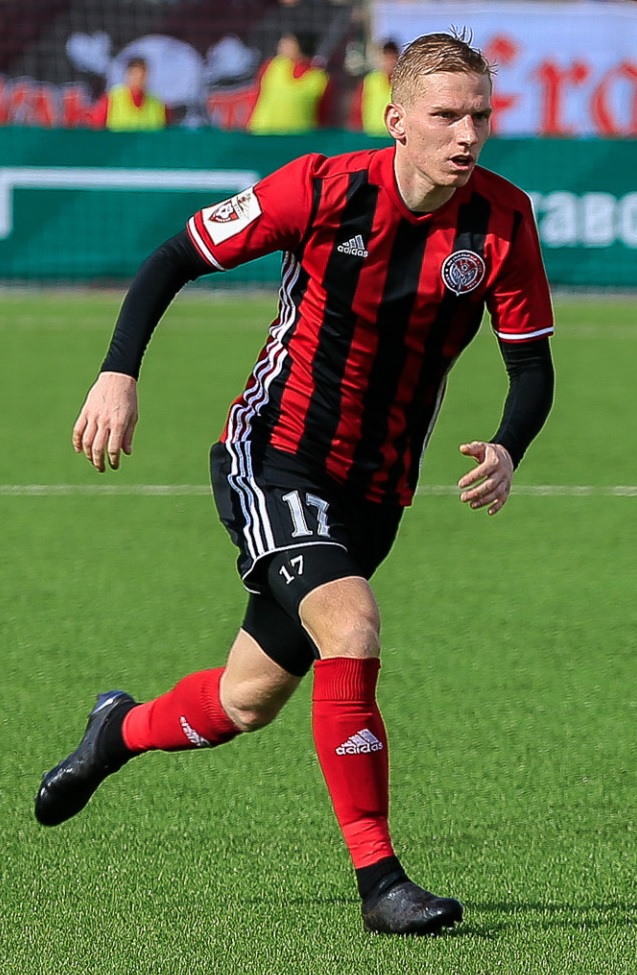
- Gashchenkov with Amkar Perm in 2018

Personal information
- Full name: Mikhail Andreyevich Gashchenkov
- Date of birth: 19 June 1992 (age 34)
- Place of birth: Moscow, Russia
- Height: 1.74 m (5 ft 9 in)
- Position: Midfielder

Senior career*
Years	Team	Apps	(Gls)
2011–2013	FC Lokomotiv-2 Moscow	67	(9)
2014–2015	FC Khimik Dzerzhinsk	31	(2)
2015–2017	FC Khimki	59	(8)
2017–2018	FC Amkar Perm	23	(2)
2018–2020	FC Akhmat Grozny	16	(0)
2020	→ FC SKA-Khabarovsk (loan)	2	(1)
2020–2021	FC Nizhny Novgorod	28	(2)
2021	FC Akzhayik	7	(2)
2021–2023	FC SKA-Khabarovsk	35	(5)
2023–2024	FC Shinnik Yaroslavl	16	(0)
2024	FC Yenisey Krasnoyarsk	11	(0)
2024	PFC Lokomotiv Tashkent	12	(2)
2025	FC KDV Tomsk	11	(2)
- * Club domestic league appearances and goals as of 19 October 2025

Mikhail Andreyevich Gashchenkov (Russian: Михаил Андреевич Гащенков; born 19 June 1992) is a Russian football central midfielder.

== Club career ==
He made his debut in the Russian Second Division for FC Lokomotiv-2 Moscow on 18 April 2011 in a game against FC Dynamo Vologda.

On 11 February 2020 he joined FC SKA-Khabarovsk on loan until the end of the 2019–20 season.

On 1 July 2021, he signed with Kazakhstan Premier League club FC Akzhayik.

On 11 December 2021, he returned to FC SKA-Khabarovsk.

== Career statistics ==
=== Club ===
As of 20 May 2018

Club	Season	League			Cup		Continental		Other		Total	
Club	Season	Division	Apps	Goals	Apps	Goals	Apps	Goals	Apps	Goals	Apps	Goals
FC Lokomotiv-2 Moscow	2011–12	PFL	27	1	2	0	–		–		29	1
FC Lokomotiv-2 Moscow	2012–13	PFL	19	3	4	0	–		–		23	3
FC Lokomotiv-2 Moscow	2013–14	PFL	21	5	1	0	–		–		22	5
FC Lokomotiv-2 Moscow	Total		67	9	7	0	0	0	0	0	74	9
FC Khimik Dzerzhinsk	2013–14	FNL	11	2	–		–		–		11	2
FC Khimik Dzerzhinsk	2014–15	FNL	20	0	2	0	–		–		22	0
FC Khimik Dzerzhinsk	Total		31	2	2	0	0	0	0	0	33	2
FC Khimki	2015–16	PFL	27	4	6	2	–		–		33	6
FC Khimki	2016–17	FNL	32	4	2	0	–		–		34	4
FC Khimki	Total		59	8	8	2	0	0	0	0	67	10
FC Amkar Perm	2017–18	Russian Premier League	23	2	3	0	–		1 (Note: One appearance in relegation play-offs)	0	27	2
Career total			180	21	20	2	0	0	1	0	201	23
