= Roland Gigolayev =

Russian footballer

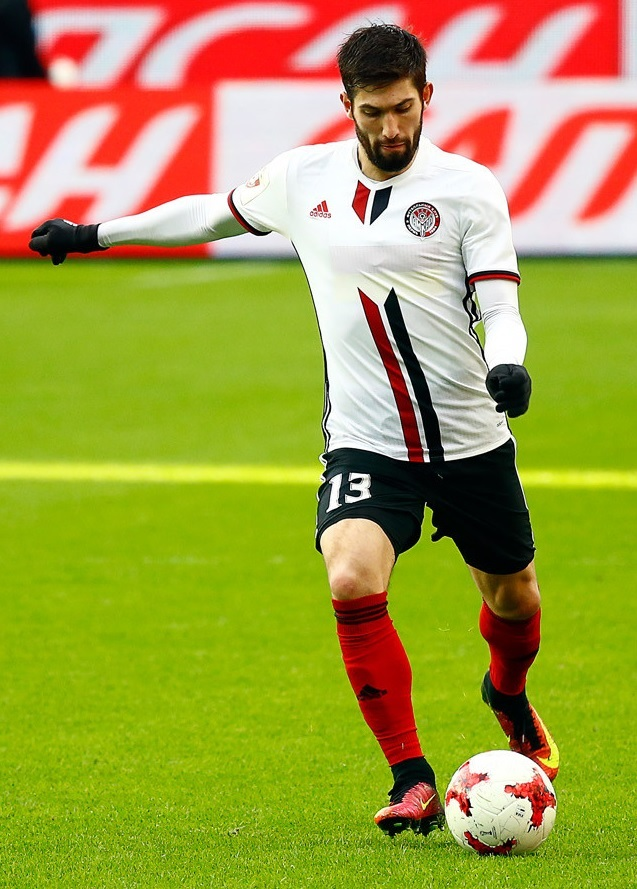
- Gigolayev with Amkar in 2017

Personal information
- Full name: Roland Teymurazovich Gigolayev
- Date of birth: 4 January 1990 (age 36)
- Place of birth: Tbilisi, Georgian SSR
- Height: 1.76 m (5 ft 9 in)
- Position: Midfielder

Youth career
- 2002–2005: Yunost Vladikavkaz
- 2005–2010: Zenit Saint Petersburg

Senior career*
Years	Team	Apps	(Gls)
2010	Zenit Saint Petersburg	0	(0)
2011–2013	Alania Vladikavkaz	45	(3)
2013	→ Petrotrest Saint Petersburg (loan)	8	(0)
2013–2014	Dynamo Saint Petersburg	22	(0)
2014–2015	Ruch Chorzów	40	(5)
2016–2017	Amkar Perm	31	(3)
2017–2020	Akhmat Grozny	9	(0)
2018–2019	→ Anzhi Makhachkala (loan)	25	(0)
2021	Kuban-Holding	13	(3)
2021	Kuban Krasnodar	12	(0)
2022	Tekstilshchik Ivanovo	4	(0)
Total		217	(18)

International career
2008	Russia U18	3	(0)
2010	Russia U20	5	(1)
2010–2011	Russia U21	2	(0)
- * Club domestic league appearances and goals

Roland Teymurazovich Gigolayev (Russian: Роланд Теймуразович Гиголаев; born 4 January 1990) is a former professional footballer who played as a midfielder or defender. Born in Georgia, he has represented Russia at youth level.

== Club career ==
Gigolayev made his professional debut for Alania Vladikavkaz on 4 April 2011, in a Russian First Division game against Torpedo Vladimir and scored 2 goals on his debut.

In the 2014–2015 season he played with Ruch Chorzów in elimination from UEFA Europa League. His team was out this elimination after matches with Metalist Kharkiv (0–0 in Gliwice and 0–1 in Kyiv).

On 17 February 2016, Gigolayev returned to Russia, signing with Amkar Perm.

On 31 August 2017, he signed a three-year contract with Akhmat Grozny. After appearing only once for Akhmat in the 2017–18 season, on 23 July 2018 Gigolayev joined Anzhi Makhachkala on a season-long loan.

== Career statistics ==
Appearances and goals by club, season and competition
Club	Season	League			National cup (Note: Includes Russian Cup, Polish Cup)		Continental		Total	
Club	Season	Division	Apps	Goals	Apps	Goals	Apps	Goals	Apps	Goals
Zenit Saint Petersburg	2010	Russian Premier League	0	0	0	0	0	0	0	0
Alania Vladikavkaz	2011–12	Russian First League	38	3	2	0	3 (Note: Appearances in UEFA Europa League)	0	43	3
Alania Vladikavkaz	2012–13	Russian Premier League	7	0	0	0	—		7	0
Alania Vladikavkaz	Total		45	3	2	0	3	0	50	3
Alania-D Vladikavkaz	2012–13	Russian Second League	8	4	3	2	—		11	6
Petrotrest (loan)	2012–13	Russian First League	8	0	—		—		8	0
Dynamo Saint Petersburg	2013–14	Russian First League	22	0	0	0	—		22	0
Ruch Chorzów	2013–14	Ekstraklasa	4	0	—		—		4	0
Ruch Chorzów	2014–15	Ekstraklasa	27	4	0	0	2	0	29	4
Ruch Chorzów	2015–16	Ekstraklasa	9	1	2	0	—		11	1
Ruch Chorzów	Total		40	5	2	0	2	0	44	5
Amkar Perm	2015–16	Russian Premier League	8	0	0	0	—		8	0
Amkar Perm	2016–17	Russian Premier League	20	3	2	1	—		22	4
Amkar Perm	2017–18	Russian Premier League	3	0	—		—		3	0
Amkar Perm	Total		31	3	2	1	0	0	33	4
Akhmat Grozny	2017–18	Russian Premier League	1	0	0	0	—		1	0
Akhmat Grozny	2019–20	Russian Premier League	8	0	0	0	—		8	0
Akhmat Grozny	Total		9	0	0	0	0	0	9	0
Anzhi Makhachkala (loan)	2018–19	Russian Premier League	25	0	2	0	—		27	0
Kuban-Holding	2020–21	Russian Second League	13	3	—		—		13	3
Kuban Krasnodar	2021–22	Russian First League	12	0	2	0	—		14	0
Tekstilshchik Ivanovo	2021–22	Russian First League	4	0	—		—		4	0
Career total			217	18	13	3	5	0	235	21
