= Aleksei Eskov (referee) =

Russian football referee

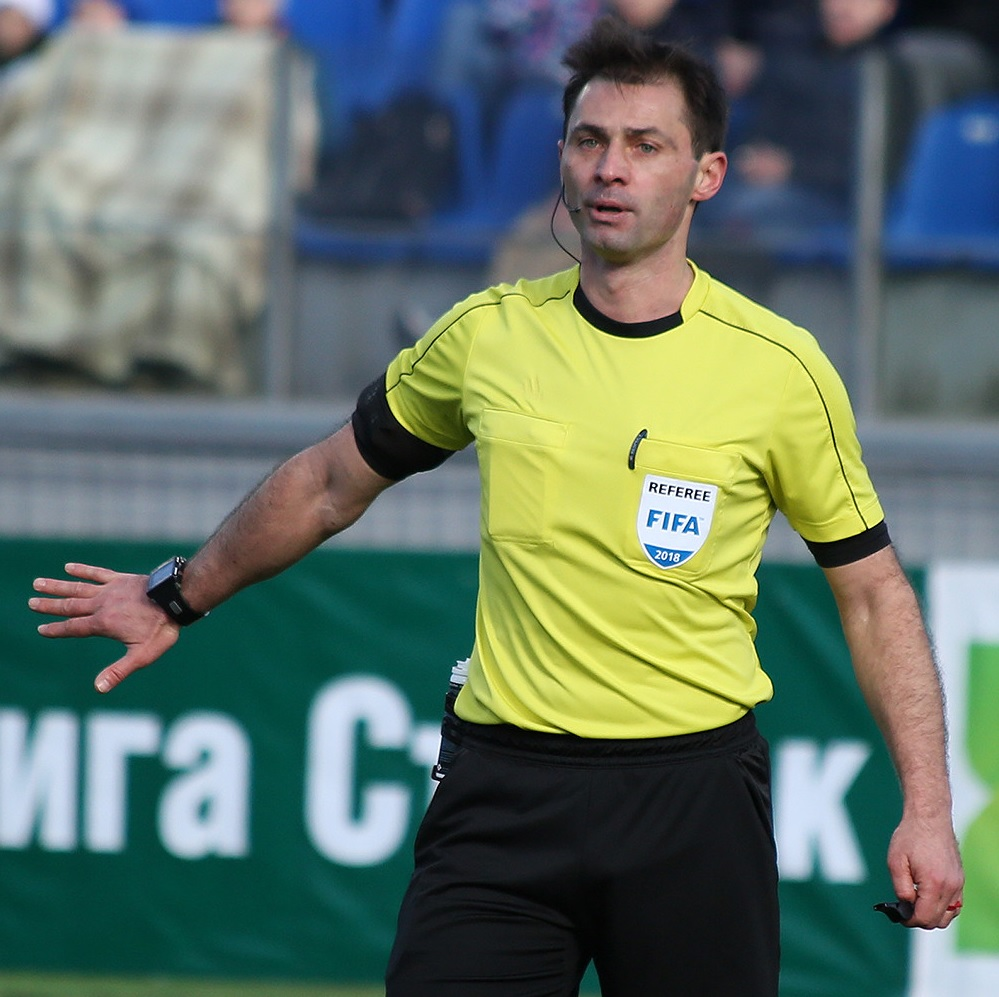
- Eskov in 2018

Personal information
- Full name: Aleksei Igorevich Eskov
- Date of birth: 7 September 1978 (age 48)
- Place of birth: Nevinnomyssk, Russia SFSR, Soviet Union
- Height: 1.68 m (5 ft 6 in)
- Position: Defender

Youth career
- RO UOR Rostov-on-Don
- 1995–1996: Montpellier (France)

Senior career*
Years	Team	Apps	(Gls)
1996	PFC CSKA-d Moscow	4	(0)
1997	FC Rostselmash-2 Rostov-on-Don	22	(2)
1998	FC Dynamo-d Moscow	1	(0)
1999	FC Baltika Kaliningrad	0	(0)
1999	FC SKA Rostov-on-Don	11	(0)
2000	KAMAZ Naberezhnye Chelny	3	(0)
2001	FC Zhemchuzhina Sochi	31	(0)
2002–2003	FC Vidnoye		
Refereeing career
Domestic
Years	League	Role
International
Years	League	Role
2011–2020	FIFA listed	Referee
- * Club domestic league appearances and goals

Aleksei Igorevich Eskov (Russian: Алексей Игоревич Еськов; born 7 September 1978) is a Russian former professional football referee and a player. He has been a full international for FIFA since 2011.

== Referee career ==
Aleksei Eskov began his referee career in 2003, he worked in the second and first divisions and the Russian Cup.

He made his debut as a referee in the Russian Premier League on 3 October 2009.

In October 2020 he retired from refereeing games.
