= 2020–21 FC Akhmat Grozny season =

FC Akhmat Grozny
2020–21 season
- Chairman: Magomed Daudov
- Manager: Andrei Talalayev
- Stadium: Akhmat-Arena
- Premier League: 11th
- Russian Cup: Semifinal vs Krylia Sovetov
- Top goalscorer: League: Vladimir Ilyin (9); All: Vladimir Ilyin (9); Bernard Berisha (9)
- Highest home attendance: 23,573 vs Krylia Sovetov (21 April 2021)
- Lowest home attendance: 2,589 vs Arsenal Tula (17 March 2021)
- Average home league attendance: 7,040 (16 May 2021)
Home colours	Away colours

The 2020–21 FC Akhmat Grozny season was the 12th successive season that the club played in the Russian Premier League, the highest tier of association football in Russia. Akhmat Grozny finished the season in 11th position and where knocked out of the Russian Cup by Krylia Sovetov in the Semifinals.

== Season events ==
On 26 July, Akhmat Grozny announced Andrei Talalayev as their new manager, after Igor Shalimov's contract wasn't renewed after it expired at the end of the previous season.

On 1 August, Akhmat Grozny announced the signing of Giorgi Shelia, on a two-year contract, with the option of a third, from Tambov.

On 5 August, Magomed Mitrishev moved to Chayka Peschanokopskoye on loan for the season.

On 6 August, Akhmat re-signed Oleg Ivanov to a one-year contract after his previous deal expired at the end of the previous season, and announced the signing of Aleksandr Putsko, to a two-year contract from Ufa, and the season-long loan deal signing of Artyom Timofeyev from Spartak Moscow.

On 12 August, Ravanelli joined Athletico Paranaense on loan until February 2021.

On 14 August, Georgi Melkadze joined Akhmat on a season-long loan deal from Spartak Moscow.

On 16 August, Akhmat announced the signing of Marat Bystrov from Ordabasy.

On 24 August, Konrad Michalak joined Çaykur Rizespor on loan for the season.

On 1 October, Akhmat announced the signing of Amir Adouyev from Montpellier to a long-term contract and Artem Polyarus from Khimki on a three-year contract.

On 12 October, Idris Umayev moved on loan to Chayka Peschanokopskoye for the season.

On 15 October, Rotor Volgograd signed Andrés Ponce on loan from Akhmat Grozny for the remainder of the season.

At the start of the winter break, Akhmat Grozny announced that they would hold eight friendly matches during their Winter Training Camp in Turkey.

On 10 January, Oleg Ivanov left Akhmat Grozny after his contract was terminated by mutual agreement.

On 13 January, Akhmat announced the signing of Gabriel Iancu from Viitorul Constanța on a 3.5-year deal.

On 20 January, Akhmat announced the signing of Ladislav Almási on loan from MFK Ružomberok for the remainder of the season.

On 15 February, Odise Roshi joined Diósgyőri on loan for the remainder of the season.

On 25 March, Ravanelli was loaned to Chapecoense until the end of the season.

On 29 March, Ablaye Mbengue joined Dinamo Minsk on loan until the end of the 2021 season.

== Squad ==
As of match played 16 May 2021

No.	Name	Nationality	Position	Date of birth (age)	Signed from	Signed in	Contract ends	Apps.	Goals
Goalkeepers
33	Vitali Gudiyev	(Russia)	GK	22 April 1995 (aged 26)	Alania Vladikavkaz	2014		35	0
42	Aleksandr Melikhov	(Russia)	GK	23 March 1998 (aged 23)	Tom Tomsk	2019	2024	2	0
88	Giorgi Shelia	(Russia)	GK	11 December 1988 (aged 32)	Tambov	2020	2022 (+1)	17	0
Defenders
4	Wilker Ángel	(Venezuela)	DF	18 March 1993 (aged 28)	Deportivo Táchira	2016		117	8
8	Miroslav Bogosavac	(Serbia)	DF	14 October 1996 (aged 24)	loan from Čukarički	2020	2024	42	0
15	Andrei Semyonov	(Russia)	DF	24 March 1989 (aged 32)	Amkar Perm	2014	2022	217	6
20	Zoran Nižić	(Croatia)	DF	11 October 1989 (aged 31)	Hajduk Split	2018	2021	58	0
24	Maksim Nenakhov	(Russia)	DF	13 December 1998 (aged 22)	Rotor Volgograd	2020	2024	40	0
38	Nikita Karmayev	(Russia)	DF	17 July 2000 (aged 20)	Youth Team	2018		6	0
40	Rizvan Utsiyev	(Russia)	DF	7 February 1988 (aged 33)	Trainee	2005		262	8
55	Aleksandr Putsko	(Russia)	DF	24 February 1993 (aged 28)	Ufa	2020	2022	21	0
96	Marat Bystrov	(Kazakhstan)	DF	19 June 1992 (aged 28)	Ordabasy	2020	2022	25	0
Midfielders
6	Amir Adouyev	(Russia)	MF	11 May 1999 (aged 22)	Montpellier	2020		10	0
7	Bernard Berisha	(Kosovo)	MF	24 October 1991 (aged 29)	Anzhi Makhachkala	2016	2023	110	15
11	Ismael	(Brazil)	MF	1 December 1994 (aged 26)	Kalmar	2017		113	7
14	Artem Polyarus	(Ukraine)	MF	5 July 1992 (aged 28)	Khimki	2020	2023	13	1
23	Anton Shvets	(Russia)	MF	26 April 1993 (aged 28)	Villarreal B	2017	2023	93	8
59	Yevgeni Kharin	(Russia)	MF	11 June 1995 (aged 25)	Levadia Tallinn	2018	2022	58	5
93	Alvi Adilkhanov	(Russia)	MF	9 March 2003 (aged 18)	Youth Team	2021		1	0
94	Artyom Timofeyev	(Russia)	MF	12 January 1994 (aged 27)	loan from Spartak Moscow	2020	2021	30	3
99	Lechi Sadulayev	(Russia)	MF	8 January 2000 (aged 21)	Academy	2018		28	1
Forwards
3	Georgi Melkadze	(Russia)	FW	4 April 1997 (aged 24)	loan from Spartak Moscow	2020	2021	24	3
9	Gabriel Iancu	(Romania)	FW	15 April 1994 (aged 27)	Viitorul Constanța	2021	2024	7	0
10	Khalid Kadyrov	(Russia)	FW	19 April 1994 (aged 27)	Trainee	2010		25	1
18	Ladislav Almási	(Slovakia)	FW	6 March 1999 (aged 22)	loan from MFK Ružomberok	2021	2021	11	0
29	Vladimir Ilyin	(Russia)	FW	20 May 1992 (aged 28)	Ural Yekaterinburg	2020	2023	40	11
90	Islam Alsultanov	(Russia)	FW	18 August 2001 (aged 19)	Trainee	2017		9	1
95	Abubakar Kadyrov	(Russia)	FW	26 August 1996 (aged 24)	Trainee	2012		2	0
Unregistered
	Pavel Kaloshin	(Russia)	DF	13 March 1998 (aged 23)	Anzhi Makhachkala	2019	2024	0	0
Away on loan
9	Andrés Ponce	(Venezuela)	FW	11 November 1996 (aged 24)	Anzhi Makhachkala	2019	2023	30	3
17	Ablaye Mbengue	(Senegal)	FW	19 May 1992 (aged 28)	Sapins	2015	2022	112	23
21	Odise Roshi	(Albania)	MF	22 May 1991 (aged 29)	HNK Rijeka	2016	2022	87	10
	Ravanelli	(Brazil)	MF	29 August 1997 (aged 23)	Ponte Preta	2017	2021	37	5
	Konrad Michalak	(Poland)	MF	19 September 1997 (aged 23)	Lechia Gdańsk	2019	2023	8	1
	Ilya Moseychuk	(Russia)	MF	19 March 2000 (aged 21)	Tekstilshchik Ivanovo	2020		0	0
	Magomed Mitrishev	(Russia)	FW	10 September 1992 (aged 28)	Spartak Nalchik	2012		129	20
	Idris Umayev	(Russia)	FW	15 January 1999 (aged 22)	Trainee	2016		6	0
Players that left Akhmat Grozny during the season
5	Arsen Adamov	(Russia)	DF	20 October 1999 (aged 21)	Academy	2016		6	0
19	Oleg Ivanov	(Russia)	MF	4 August 1986 (aged 34)	Rostov	2012	2021	242	16
27	Felipe Vizeu	(Brazil)	FW	12 March 1997 (aged 24)	loan from Udinese	2020	2020	7	1

=== On loan ===
Note: Flags indicate national team as defined under FIFA eligibility rules; some limited exceptions apply. Players may hold more than one non-FIFA nationality.

No.	Pos.	Nation	Player
21	MF	ALB	Odise Roshi (at Diósgyőri)
—	MF	BRA	Ravanelli (at Chapecoense)
—	MF	POL	Konrad Michalak (at Çaykur Rizespor until end of the season)
—	MF	RUS	Ilya Moseychuk (at Tekstilshchik Ivanovo until end of the season)

No.	Pos.	Nation	Player
—	FW	RUS	Idris Umayev (at Chayka Peschanokopskoye until end of the season)
—	FW	RUS	Magomed Mitrishev (at Chayka Peschanokopskoye until end of the season)
—	FW	SEN	Ablaye Mbengue (at Dinamo Minsk until December 2021 season)
—	FW	VEN	Andrés Ponce (at Rotor Volgograd until end of the season)

=== Left club during season ===
Note: Flags indicate national team as defined under FIFA eligibility rules; some limited exceptions apply. Players may hold more than one non-FIFA nationality.

No.	Pos.	Nation	Player
5	DF	RUS	Arsen Adamov (to Ural Yekaterinburg)
19	MF	RUS	Oleg Ivanov

No.	Pos.	Nation	Player
27	FW	BRA	Felipe Vizeu (loan return to Udinese)

== Transfers ==
=== In ===
Date	Position	Nationality	Name	From	Fee	Ref.
1 August 2020	GK	(Russia)	Giorgi Shelia	Tambov	Undisclosed	
6 August 2020	DF	(Russia)	Aleksandr Putsko	Ufa	Undisclosed	
16 August 2020	DF	(Kazakhstan)	Marat Bystrov	Ordabasy	Undisclosed	
1 October 2020	MF	(Russia)	Amir Adouyev	Montpellier	Undisclosed	
1 October 2020	DF	(Ukraine)	Artem Polyarus	Khimki	Undisclosed	
13 January 2021	FW	(Romania)	Gabriel Iancu	Viitorul Constanța	Undisclosed	

=== Loans in ===
Date from	Position	Nationality	Name	From	Date to	Ref.
16 January 2020	FW	(Brazil)	Felipe Vizeu	Udinese	17 September 2020	
6 August 2020	MF	(Russia)	Artyom Timofeyev	Spartak Moscow	End of season	
14 August 2020	FW	(Russia)	Georgi Melkadze	Spartak Moscow	End of season	
20 January 2021	FW	(Slovakia)	Ladislav Almási	MFK Ružomberok	End of season	

=== Out ===
Date	Position	Nationality	Name	To	Fee	Ref.
31 July 2020	MF	(Russia)	Mikhail Gashchenkov	Nizhny Novgorod	Undisclosed	
15 January 2021	DF	(Russia)	Arsen Adamov	Ural Yekaterinburg	Undisclosed	

=== Loans out ===
Date from	Position	Nationality	Name	To	Date to	Ref.
5 August 2020	FW	(Russia)	Magomed Mitrishev	Chayka Peschanokopskoye	End of season	
7 August 2020	MF	(Russia)	Ilya Moseichuk	Tekstilshchik Ivanovo	End of season	
12 August 2020	MF	(Brazil)	Ravanelli	Athletico Paranaense	1 February 2021	
24 August 2020	MF	(Poland)	Konrad Michalak	Çaykur Rizespor	End of season	
12 October 2020	FW	(Russia)	Idris Umayev	Chayka Peschanokopskoye	End of season	
15 October 2020	FW	(Venezuela)	Andrés Ponce	Rotor Volgograd	End of season	
15 February 2021	MF	(Albania)	Odise Roshi	Diósgyőri	End of season	
25 March 2021	MF	(Brazil)	Ravanelli	Chapecoense	December 2021	
29 March 2021	FW	(Senegal)	Ablaye Mbengue	Dinamo Minsk	December 2021	

=== Released ===
Date	Position	Nationality	Name	Joined	Date	Ref.
10 January 2021	MF	(Russia)	Oleg Ivanov	Ufa	21 January 2021	
17 May 2021	DF	(Venezuela)	Wilker Ángel	Göztepe	8 September 2021	
17 May 2021	MF	(Brazil)	Ismael	Al Faisaly	25 July 2021	
30 June 2021	DF	(Russia)	Pavel Kaloshin	Irtysh Omsk	17 August 2021	
30 June 2021	FW	(Russia)	Magomed Mitrishev			

== Friendlies ==
19 January 2021	Akhmat Grozny (Russia)	3 – 1	(Kosovo) Arbëria	Belek, Turkey
17:00 MSK (UTC+3)	Ilyin 8'; Shvets 26'; K.Kadyrov 71'	Report	A.Kryeziu (penalty missed) 67'; D.Zabërgja 68'	Stadium: Sueno Hotel

28 January 2021	Akhmat Grozny (Russia)	1 – 1	(North Macedonia) Shkupi	Lara, Turkey
11:00 MSK (UTC+3)	Semyonov 73'	Report	Ademi 39'	Stadium: Titanic Hotel Lara

28 January 2021	Akhmat Grozny (Russia)	1 – 1	(Serbia) Vojvodina	Belek, Turkey
17:00 MSK (UTC+3)	Nižić 48'	Report	Bralić 62'	Stadium: Cornelia Hotel

3 February 2021	Akhmat Grozny (Russia)	5 – 1	(Kazakhstan) Kyzylzhar	Belek, Turkey
11:00 MSK (UTC+3)	Polyarus; Melkadze; K.Kadyrov	Report	Goal	Stadium: Aisi Santay Sports Complex

3 February 2021	Akhmat Grozny (Russia)	1 – 0	(Latvia) Liepāja	Belek, Turkey
1:007 MSK (UTC+3)	Semyonov 33'	Report

11 February 2021	Akhmat Grozny	2 – 3	Tom Tomsk	Belek, Turkey
11:00 MSK (UTC+3)	Iancu 30' (pen.); Ilyin 64' (pen.)	Report	Simonyan 53', 84'; Zuyev 67'

11 February 2021	Akhmat Grozny	1 – 2	Sochi	Belek, Turkey
17:00 MSK (UTC+3)	Melkadze 44'	Report	Joãozinho 23'; Margasov 87'

15 February 2021	Akhmat Grozny (Russia)	1 – 0	(Kazakhstan) Shakhter Karagandy	Belek, Turkey
MSK (UTC+3)		Report

== Competitions ==
=== Overview ===
Competition	First match	Last match	Starting round	Final position	Record							
Competition	First match	Last match	Starting round	Final position	Pld	W	D	L	GF	GA	GD	Win %
Premier League	9 August 2020	16 May 2021	Matchday 1	10th	30	11	7	12	36	38	−2	36.67
Russian Cup	17 September 2020	21 April 2021	Round of 32	Semifinal	5	3	2	0	6	1	+5	60.00
Total					35	14	9	12	42	39	+3	40.00

Last updated: 16 May 2021
Source: Competitions

=== Premier League ===
==== Results summary ====
Overall								Home						Away					
Pld	W	D	L	GF	GA	GD	Pts	W	D	L	GF	GA	GD	W	D	L	GF	GA	GD
30	11	7	12	36	38	−2	40	7	4	4	23	15	+8	4	3	8	13	23	−10

Last updated: 16 May 2021.
Source: See Results

==== Results by round ====
Round	1	2	3	4	5	6	7	8	9	10	11	12	13	14	15	16	17	18	19	20	21	22	23	24	25	26	27	28	29	30
Ground	A	A	H	A	A	H	A	A	H	A	A	H	H	A	H	H	A	H	H	H	A	A	H	A	A	H	A	A	H	H
Result	D	L	W	W	W	L	L	L	W	D	L	W	W	W	D	D	L	L	D	L	L	L	W	W	L	W	D	L	W	D
Position	10	14	9	6	5	7	7	10	10	10	10	10	9	7	7	6	8	10	10	11	11	11	11	11	11	10	11	11	10	11

Updated to match(es) played on 16 May 2021. Source: Premier Liga
A = Away; H = Home; W = Win; D = Draw; L = Loss

==== Results ====
9 August 2020 1	Arsenal Tula	0 – 0	Akhmat Grozny	Tula
19:00 MSK (UTC+3)	Dovbnya (yellow card) 14'; Khlusevich (yellow card) 90'; Gromyko (yellow card) 90+5'	Report	Nenakhov (yellow card) 14'; Nižić (yellow card) 49'	Stadium: Arsenal Stadium; Attendance: 1,892; Referee: Kirill Levnikov

14 August 2020 2	Spartak Moscow	2 – 0	Akhmat Grozny	Moscow
20:00 MSK (UTC+3)	Král (yellow card) 40'; Larsson 52' (pen.); Ponce 69'; Zobnin (yellow card) 86'	Report	Berisha (yellow card) 2'; Shvets (yellow card) 26'; Kharin (yellow card) 38'; Ismael (yellow card) 40'; Semyonov (yellow card) 50'; Nenakhov (yellow card) 68' (yellow-red card) 77'; Bogosavac (yellow card) 72'; Roshi (yellow card) 90+'	Stadium: Otkritie Arena; Attendance: 8,946; Referee: Evgeny Turbin

19 August 2020 3	Akhmat Grozny	3 – 1	Rotor Volgograd	Grozny
18:00 MSK (UTC+3)	Ponce (penalty missed) 29'; Timofeyev (yellow card) 45+3'; Ilyin 47'; Roshi 53', 61' (yellow card) 53'; Ismael (yellow card) 69'	Report	Mullin (yellow card) 43'; Gogoua (yellow card) 45' (yellow-red card) 71'; Serchenkov 58'; Piskunov (yellow card) 62'	Stadium: Akhmat-Arena; Attendance: 5,811; Referee: Sergey Lapochkin

22 August 2020 4	Khimki	1 – 2	Akhmat Grozny	Khimki
16:00 MSK (UTC+3)	Bozhenov (yellow card) 16' (yellow-red card) 90+3'; Danilkin 21'; Polyarus (yellow card) 39' (penalty missed) 66'; Idowu (yellow card) 72' (yellow-red card) 76'; Troshechkin (yellow card) 88'	Report	Ismael (yellow card) 3'; Ponce (yellow card) 35'; Ilyin 73' (pen.); Timofeyev 74'; Berisha (yellow card) 76'; Semyonov (yellow card) 80'; A.Kadyrov (yellow card) 90'	Stadium: Arena Khimki; Attendance: 1,630; Referee: Pavel Kukuyan

26 August 2020 5	Lokomotiv Moscow	2 – 3	Akhmat Grozny	Moscow
18:30 MSK (UTC+3)	Ignatyev (yellow card) 24'; Zhemaletdinov (yellow card) 34'; An.Miranchuk 48' (pen.); Eder (yellow card) 70'; Krychowiak 77'; Cerqueira (yellow card) 90+4'; Kulikov (yellow card) 90+4'	Report	Ilyin 3' (yellow card) 90'; Nenakhov (yellow card) 25'; Timofeyev (yellow card) 32' (goal) 45+1'; Bystrov (yellow card) 39' (yellow-red card) 62'; Berisha 58' (yellow card) 60'; Semyonov (yellow card) 71'; Ivanov (yellow card) 90+1'; Shvets (yellow card) 90+2' (red card) 90+2'	Stadium: RZD Arena; Attendance: 4,859; Referee: Igor Panin

30 August 2020 6	Akhmat Grozny	0 – 3	CSKA Moscow	Grozny
18:00 MSK (UTC+3)	Semyonov (yellow card) 61'; Adamov (yellow card) 87'; Nižić (yellow card) 89'	Report	Kuchayev 11'; Tiknizyan (yellow card) 30'; Maradishvili (yellow card) 39'; Fernandes (yellow card) 49'; Chalov (yellow card) 52'; Diveyev (yellow card) 75'; Shchennikov (yellow card) 78'; Zaynutdinov (yellow card) 84'; Bistrović 88'; Vlašić 90'	Stadium: Akhmat-Arena; Attendance: 6,413; Referee: Sergey Ivanov

12 September 2020 7	Akhmat Grozny	0 – 1	Sochi	Grozny
19:00 MSK (UTC+3)		Report	Noboa 24'; Burmistrov (yellow card) 39'; Margasov (yellow card) 90+'	Stadium: Akhmat-Arena; Attendance: 6,084; Referee: Vitali Meshkov

21 September 2020 8	Dynamo Moscow	1 – 0	Akhmat Grozny	Moscow
19:00 MSK (UTC+3)	Shvets (yellow card) 27'; Ilyin (yellow card) 48'; Bogosavac (yellow card) 76' (yellow-red card) 80'; Timofeyev (yellow card) 82'	Report	Slepov (yellow card) 31'; Grulyov (yellow card) 66'; Lesovoy (yellow card) 87'; Ordets 90+' (yellow card) 90+'	Stadium: VTB Arena; Attendance: 4,512; Referee: Mikhail Vilkov

27 September 2020 9	Akhmat Grozny	2 – 0	Ural Yekaterinburg	Grozny
16:30 MSK (UTC+3)	Melkadze 2'; Kharin (yellow card) 31'; Ilyin (penalty missed) 39'; Berisha (yellow card) 42' (goal) 57' (pen.); Nenakhov (yellow card) 46'; Sadulayev (yellow card) 78'; Karmayev (yellow card) 86'; Shvets (yellow card) 90'	Report	Strandberg (yellow card) 24' (yellow-red card) 38'; Rykov (yellow card) 64'	Stadium: Akhmat-Arena; Attendance: 4,961; Referee: Pavel Kukuyan

4 October 2020 10	Rubin Kazan	1 – 1	Akhmat Grozny	Kazan
16:30 MSK (UTC+3)	Kvaratskhelia 53'; Samoshnikov (yellow card) 61'; Jevtić (yellow card) 64' (yellow-red card) 68'; Bystrov (yellow card) 75'	Report	Nenakhov (yellow card) 9'; Melkadze (yellow card) 47'; Melkadze 80' (pen.); Timofeyev (yellow card) 89'	Stadium: Ak Bars Arena; Attendance: 6,387; Referee: Vladimir Moskalyov

18 October 2020 11	Rostov	3 – 0	Akhmat Grozny	Rostov-on-Don
19:00 MSK (UTC+3)	Hashimoto 24' (yellow card) 82'; Terentyev (yellow card) 35'; Eremenko 90+'; Glebov 90+'	Report	Shvets (yellow card) 16' (yellow-red card) 75'; Melkadze (penalty missed) 40'	Stadium: Rostov Arena; Attendance: 10,312; Referee: Aleksei Matyunin

25 October 2020 12	Akhmat Grozny	3 – 1	Ufa	Grozny
19:00 MSK (UTC+3)	Berisha 14' (pen.), 77' (yellow card) 77'; Semyonov (yellow card) 42' (yellow-red card) 58'; Ilyin 68'	Report	Pliyev (yellow card) 44'; Tabidze (yellow card) 52'; Aliyev 56'; Jokić (yellow card) 86'	Stadium: Akhmat-Arena; Attendance: 4,881; Referee: Sergey Lapochkin

31 October 2020 13	Akhmat Grozny	2 – 0	Krasnodar	Grozny
16:30 MSK (UTC+3)	Ismael (yellow card) 45' (goal) 82'; Ángel 67'; Nižić (yellow card) 88'	Report	Ramírez (yellow card) 37'; Litvinov (yellow card) 52'; Kaio (yellow card) 54'; Gazinsky (yellow card) 73'; Kambolov (yellow card) 90+'	Stadium: Akhmat-Arena; Attendance: 5,751; Referee: Evgeny Kukulyak

7 November 2020 14	Tambov	0 – 1	Akhmat Grozny	Saransk
19:00 MSK (UTC+3)	Onugkha (yellow card) 44'	Report	Nenakhov (yellow card) 33'; Ilyin (yellow card) 82'; Timofeyev 87'	Stadium: Mordovia Arena; Referee: Sergey Ivanov
Note: Match played at the Mordovia Arena in Saransk instead of Tambov's regular Spartak Stadium.

21 November 2020 15	Akhmat Grozny	2 – 2	Zenit St.Petersburg	Grozny
16:30 MSK (UTC+3)	Berisha 26', 53' (pen.)	Report	Kuzyayev 16'; Lovren 48'; Chistyakov (yellow card) 52'; Rakitskiy (yellow card) 55' (yellow-red card) 90+'	Stadium: Akhmat-Arena; Attendance: 6,241; Referee: Sergei Karasev

28 November 2020 16	Akhmat Grozny	0 – 0	Lokomotiv Moscow	Grozny
19:00 MSK (UTC+3)	Melkadze (yellow card) 43'; Nenakhov (yellow card) 61'	Report	Magkeyev (yellow card) 10'; Murilo (yellow card) 45'; Kulikov (yellow card) 67'	Stadium: Akhmat-Arena; Attendance: 5,093; Referee: Kirill Levnikov

7 December 2020 17	Sochi	2 – 0	Akhmat Grozny	Sochi
19:00 MSK (UTC+3)	Dugandžić 31' (yellow card) 43'; Yusupov 45+'; Mammana (yellow card) 49'; Margasov (yellow card) 60'	Report	Berisha (penalty missed) 17'; Nenakhov (yellow card) 41'	Stadium: Fisht Olympic Stadium; Attendance: 2,663; Referee: Sergey Lapochkin

13 December 2020 18	Akhmat Grozny	0 – 1	Rostov	Grozny
19:00 MSK (UTC+3)	Ilyin (yellow card) 66'	Report	Hadžikadunić (yellow card) 13'; Tugarev 82'	Stadium: Akhmat-Arena; Attendance: 6,308; Referee: Nikolay Voloshin

17 December 2020 19	Akhmat Grozny	0 – 0	Rubin Kazan	Grozny
20:00 MSK (UTC+3)	Putsko (yellow card) 27'	Report	Jevtić (yellow card) 22'; Hwang (yellow card) 68'; Abildgaard (yellow card) 90+3'	Stadium: Akhmat-Arena; Attendance: 4,958; Referee: Stanislav Vasiliev

28 February 2021 20	Akhmat Grozny	1 – 2	Dynamo Moscow	Grozny
16:30 MSK (UTC+3)	Shvets (yellow card) 16' (goal) 68'; Timofeyev (yellow card) 23' (yellow-red card) 77'; Ángel (yellow card) 40'; Berisha (yellow card) 42'; Kharin (yellow card) 52'; Melkadze (yellow card) 79'	Report	Fomin 7' (pen.); Szymański (yellow card) 34'; Zakharyan 37'; Shunin (yellow card) 90+4'	Stadium: Akhmat-Arena; Attendance: 25,317; Referee: Vladislav Bezborodov

8 March 2021 21	CSKA Moscow	2 – 0	Akhmat Grozny	Moscow
19:00 MSK (UTC+3)	Fernandes (yellow card) 27'; Rondón 39' (pen.); Vlašić 52'; Tiknizyan (yellow card) 90+'	Report	Bogosavac (yellow card) 21'; Berisha (yellow card) 35'; Shelia (yellow card) 53'; Nenakhov (yellow card) 67'; Shvets (yellow card) 80'	Stadium: VEB Arena; Attendance: 6,085; Referee: Ivan Sidenkov

13 March 2021 22	Zenit St.Petersburg	4 – 0	Akhmat Grozny	Saint Petersburg
16:30 MSK (UTC+3)	Douglas (yellow card) 36'; Karavayev 52'; Azmoun 65' (pen.); Rakitskiy (yellow card) 67'; Dzyuba 74'; Mostovoy 80'	Report	Berisha (yellow card) 62'; Putsko (yellow card) 64'; Semyonov (yellow card) 65'	Stadium: Krestovsky Stadium; Attendance: 22,551; Referee: Vitali Meshkov

17 March 2021 23	Akhmat Grozny	2 – 0	Arsenal Tula	Grozny
20:00 MSK (UTC+3)	Ismael (yellow card) 21'; Shvets (yellow card) 28'; Semyonov 34'; Ilyin (yellow card) 41' (goal) 47'	Report	Čaušić (yellow card) 27'; Sokol (yellow card) 32'; Panteleyev (yellow card) 35'; E.Kangwa (yellow card) 90+'	Stadium: Akhmat-Arena; Attendance: 2,589; Referee: Sergey Lapochkin

3 April 2021 24	Krasnodar	0 – 5	Akhmat Grozny	Krasnodar
16:30 MSK (UTC+3)	Claesson (yellow card) 35'; Sorokin (yellow card) 81'; Ari (yellow card) 83'; Suleymanov (yellow card) 90+'	Report	Kharin 5'; Semyonov 49'; Berisha 51', 68'; Shvets (yellow card) 82'; Ionov 90+' (o.g.)	Stadium: Krasnodar Stadium; Attendance: 10,554; Referee: Kirill Levnikov

10 April 2021 25	Ufa	3 – 0	Akhmat Grozny	Ufa
16:30 MSK (UTC+3)	Mrzljak 13'; Krotov (yellow card) 33'; Ángel 36' (o.g.); Miletić 54' (yellow card) 89'; Kamilov (yellow card) 55'; Pliyev (yellow card) 73'	Report	Timofeyev (yellow card) 15'; Nenakhov (yellow card) 90+'	Stadium: Neftyanik Stadium; Attendance: 5,621; Referee: Pavel Kukuyan

17 April 2021 26	Akhmat Grozny	3 – 1	Khimki	Grozny
14:00 MSK (UTC+3)	Kharin (yellow card) 9' (goal) 26'; Nenakhov (yellow card) 30'; Ilyin (penalty missed) 34' 44'; Almási (yellow card) 56'; Melkadze 65'; Timofeyev (yellow card) 75'; Shvets (yellow card) 90'; Sadulayev (yellow card) 90+'	Report	Sebai (yellow card) 38'; Danilkin (yellow card) 44'; Idowu 88' (yellow card) 90+'	Stadium: Akhmat-Arena; Attendance: 3,574; Referee: Vasily Kazartsev

24 April 2021 27	Ural Yekaterinburg	1 – 1	Akhmat Grozny	Yekaterinburg
14:00 MSK (UTC+3)	Yegorychev (yellow card) 39'; Augustyniak 58'	Report	Sadulayev 11'; Timofeyev (yellow card) 22'; Berisha (yellow card) 25'; Shvets (yellow card) 77'	Stadium: Central Stadium; Attendance: 8,697; Referee: Ivan Sidenkov

1 May 2021 28	Rotor Volgograd	1 – 0	Akhmat Grozny	Volgograd
14:00 MSK (UTC+3)	Shchotkin 23' (yellow card) 57'; Gogoua (yellow card) 50'; Čondrić (yellow card) 81'	Report	Sadulayev (yellow card) 41'; Bogosavac (yellow card) 52'; Semyonov (yellow card) 65'; Ismael (yellow card) 67' Iancu (yellow card) 90'	Stadium: Volgograd Arena; Attendance: 7,132; Referee: Stanislav Vasiliev

7 May 2021 29	Akhmat Grozny	3 – 1	Tambov	Grozny
18:00 MSK (UTC+3)	Kharin 15'; Polyarus 18'; Ismael (yellow card) 44'; Sadulayev (yellow card) 66'; Alsultanov (yellow card) 72'; Ilyin (yellow card) 77' (goal) 80'	Report	Kabakhidze (yellow card) 4'; Arkhipov 63'; Denisov (yellow card) 86'	Stadium: Akhmat-Arena; Attendance: 7,475; Referee: Aleksei Matyunin

16 May 2021 30	Akhmat Grozny	2 – 2	Spartak Moscow	Grozny
14:00 MSK (UTC+3)	Nenakhov (yellow card) 8'; Ilyin 20', 31'; Bystrov (yellow card) 43'; Berisha (yellow card) 74'	Report	Promes 54'; Dzhikiya (yellow card) 67'; Moses 83'; Zobnin (yellow card) 87'; Sobolev (yellow card) 90+'	Stadium: Akhmat-Arena; Attendance: 11,086; Referee: Pavel Kukuyan

==== League table ====
Pos	Team	Pld	W	D	L	GF	GA	GD	Pts
9	Rostov	30	13	4	13	37	35	+2	43
10	Krasnodar	30	12	5	13	52	45	+7	41
11	Akhmat Grozny	30	11	7	12	36	38	−2	40
12	Ural Yekaterinburg	30	7	13	10	26	36	−10	34
13	Ufa	30	6	7	17	26	46	−20	25

Source: Premier Liga
Rules for classification: 1) Points; 2) Head-to-head points; 3) Head-to-head matches won; 4) Head-to-head goal difference; 5) Head-to-head goals scored; 6) Matches won; 7) Goal difference; 8) Goals scored; 9) Play-off.

=== Russian Cup ===
==== Round of 32 ====
Pos	Team	Pld	W	OTW	OTL	L	GF	GA	GD	Pts	Qualification
1	Akhmat Grozny	2	1	1	0	0	4	1	+3	5	Advance to Play-off
2	Znamya Noginsk	2	1	0	0	1	3	3	0	3	
3	Shinnik Yaroslavl	2	0	0	1	1	1	4	−3	1	

17 September 2020 1	Znamya Noginsk	0 – 3	Akhmat Grozny	Noginsk
15:00 MSK (UTC+3)	A.Nikiforov (yellow card) 45'; Belov (yellow card) 69'	Report	Shvets 16', 39'; Melkadze (yellow card) 76'; Ivanov 89'	Stadium: Istomkino Stadium; Referee: S.Cheban

21 October 2020 2	Shinnik Yaroslavl	1 – 1 (a.e.t.) (3–4 p)	Akhmat Grozny	Yaroslavl
18:30 MSK (UTC+3)	Matskharashvili (yellow card) 19'; Kutin (yellow card) 34'; Shchadin (yellow card) 37'; Dorofeyev (yellow card) 69'; Yevseyev 90+'	Report	Semyonov (yellow card) 16'; Adouyev (yellow card) 18'; Ángel (yellow card) 37'; Sadulayev (yellow card) 39'; Alsultanov 54'; Shvets (yellow card) 79'	Stadium: Shinnik Stadium; Referee: Pavel Shadykhanov
	Penalties
	Pukhov (penalty scored); Betyuzhnov (penalty scored); Golub (penalty missed); Maslennikov (penalty scored); Zinkov (penalty missed)		Kharin (penalty scored); Ángel (penalty missed); Shvets (penalty scored); Alsultanov (penalty scored); Karmayev (penalty scored)

==== Knockout stage ====
21 February 2021 Round of 16	Rostov	0 – 1	Akhmat Grozny	Rostov-on-Don
19:30 MSK (UTC+3)	Hadžikadunić (yellow card) 23'; Glebov (yellow card) 74'; Normann (penalty missed) 82'; Makhatadze (yellow card) 85'	Report	Nenakhov (yellow card) 5' (yellow-red card) 47'; Berisha (yellow card) 6' (goal) 19' (pen.); Shvets (yellow card) 13'; Timofeyev (yellow card) 40'	Stadium: Rostov Arena; Attendance: 10,054; Referee: Igor Panin

7 April 2021 Quarterfinal	Akhmat Grozny	1 – 0	Ufa	Grozny
19:00 MSK (UTC+3)	Bystrov (yellow card) 3'; Kharin 55'; Semyonov (yellow card) 65'	Report	Sysuyev (yellow card) 29'; Bizoza (yellow card) 62'; Nikitin (yellow card) 88'; Kamilov (yellow card) 88'; Morozov (yellow card) 90+3'	Stadium: Akhmat-Arena; Attendance: 14,876; Referee: Evgeny Kukulyak

21 April 2021 Semifinal	Akhmat Grozny	0 – 0 (a.e.t.) (1 – 4 p)	Krylia Sovetov	Grozny
16:00 MSK (UTC+3)	Nenakhov (yellow card) 44'; Ilyin (yellow card) 46'; Ángel (yellow card) 51'; Semyonov (yellow card) 60'; Shvets (yellow card) 66'	Report	Alves (yellow card) 6'; Yezhov (yellow card) 45+'; Gorshkov (yellow card) 74'; Kabutov (yellow card) 90+'	Stadium: Akhmat-Arena; Attendance: 23,573; Referee: Vladimir Moskalyov
	Penalties
	Putsko (penalty scored); Iancu (penalty missed); Berisha (penalty missed)		Sergeyev (penalty scored); Alves (penalty scored); Golenkov (penalty scored); D.Kombarov (penalty scored)

== Squad statistics ==
As of match played 16 May 2021

=== Appearances and goals ===
No.	Pos	Nat	Player	Total		Premier League		Russian Cup	
No.	Pos	Nat	Player	Apps	Goals	Apps	Goals	Apps	Goals
3	FW	(Russia) RUS	Georgi Melkadze	24	3	12+7	3	3+2	0
4	DF	(Venezuela) VEN	Wilker Ángel	21	1	11+5	1	3+2	0
6	MF	(Russia) RUS	Amir Adouyev	10	0	0+8	0	1+1	0
7	MF	(Kosovo) KOS	Bernard Berisha	31	9	23+4	8	2+2	1
8	DF	(Serbia) SRB	Miroslav Bogosavac	32	0	28+1	0	3	0
9	FW	(Romania) ROU	Gabriel Iancu	7	0	2+4	0	0+1	0
10	FW	(Russia) RUS	Khalid Kadyrov	7	0	0+5	0	1+1	0
11	MF	(Brazil) BRA	Ismael	28	1	21+5	1	1+1	0
14	MF	(Ukraine) UKR	Artem Polyarus	13	1	8+4	1	1	0
15	DF	(Russia) RUS	Andrei Semyonov	23	2	18	2	5	0
18	FW	(Slovenia) SLO	Ladislav Almási	11	0	1+7	0	1+2	0
20	DF	(Croatia) CRO	Zoran Nižić	26	0	23+1	0	2	0
23	MF	(Russia) RUS	Anton Shvets	26	3	14+7	1	4+1	2
24	DF	(Russia) RUS	Maksim Nenakhov	31	0	26+1	0	4	0
29	FW	(Russia) RUS	Vladimir Ilyin	31	9	25+3	9	3	0
33	GK	(Russia) RUS	Vitali Gudiyev	17	0	14	0	3	0
38	DF	(Russia) RUS	Nikita Karmayev	6	0	0+5	0	0+1	0
40	DF	(Russia) RUS	Rizvan Utsiyev	1	0	0+1	0	0	0
42	GK	(Russia) RUS	Aleksandr Melikhov	1	0	0	0	1	0
55	DF	(Russia) RUS	Aleksandr Putsko	21	0	13+4	0	2+2	0
59	MF	(Russia) RUS	Yevgeni Kharin	33	4	22+7	3	3+1	1
88	GK	(Russia) RUS	Giorgi Shelia	17	0	16	0	1	0
90	FW	(Russia) RUS	Islam Alsultanov	9	1	0+8	0	0+1	1
93	MF	(Russia) RUS	Alvi Adilkhanov	1	0	0+1	0	0	0
94	MF	(Russia) RUS	Artyom Timofeyev	30	3	25+1	3	4	0
95	FW	(Russia) RUS	Abubakar Kadyrov	2	0	0+1	0	0+1	0
96	DF	(Kazakhstan) KAZ	Marat Bystrov	25	0	15+7	0	2+1	0
99	MF	(Russia) RUS	Lechi Sadulayev	20	1	2+16	1	2	0
Players away from the club on loan:
9	FW	(Venezuela) VEN	Andrés Ponce	10	0	5+4	0	1	0
18	FW	(Russia) RUS	Idris Umayev	5	0	2+2	0	0+1	0
21	MF	(Albania) ALB	Odise Roshi	6	2	1+5	2	0	0
Players who appeared for Akhmat Grozny but left during the season:
5	DF	(Russia) RUS	Arsen Adamov	5	0	0+3	0	1+1	0
19	MF	(Russia) RUS	Oleg Ivanov	14	1	3+10	0	1	1

=== Goal scorers ===
Place	Position	Nation	Number	Name	Premier League	Russian Cup	Total
1	FW	(Russia)	29	Vladimir Ilyin	9	0	9
1	MF	(Kosovo)	7	Bernard Berisha	8	1	9
3	MF	(Russia)	59	Yevgeni Kharin	3	1	4
4	MF	(Russia)	94	Artyom Timofeyev	3	0	3
4	FW	(Russia)	3	Georgi Melkadze	3	0	3
4	MF	(Russia)	23	Anton Shvets	1	2	3
7	MF	(Albania)	21	Odise Roshi	2	0	2
7	DF	(Russia)	15	Andrei Semyonov	2	0	2
9	DF	(Venezuela)	4	Wilker Ángel	1	0	1
9	MF	(Brazil)	11	Ismael	1	0	1
9	MF	(Russia)	99	Lechi Sadulayev	1	0	1
9	MF	(Ukraine)	14	Artem Polyarus	1	0	1
9	MF	(Russia)	19	Oleg Ivanov	0	1	1
9	FW	(Russia)	90	Islam Alsultanov	0	1	1
9				Own goal	1	0	1
Total					36	6	42

=== Clean sheets ===
Place	Position	Nation	Number	Name	Premier League	Russian Cup	Total
1	GK	(Russia)	33	Vitali Gudiyev	6	3	9
2	GK	(Russia)	88	Giorgi Shelia	2	1	3
Total					8	4	12

=== Disciplinary record ===
Number	Nation	Position	Name	Premier League		Russian Cup		Total	
Number	Nation	Position	Name	Booked	Sent off (straight red)	Booked	Sent off (straight red)	Booked	Sent off (straight red)
3	(Russia)	FW	Georgi Melkadze	3	0	1	0	4	0
4	(Venezuela)	DF	Wilker Ángel	1	0	2	0	3	0
6	(Russia)	MF	Amir Adouyev	0	0	1	0	1	0
7	(Kosovo)	MF	Bernard Berisha	10	0	1	0	11	0
8	(Serbia)	DF	Miroslav Bogosavac	5	1	0	0	5	1
9	(Romania)	FW	Gabriel Iancu	1	0	0	0	1	0
11	(Brazil)	MF	Ismael	7	0	0	0	7	0
15	(Russia)	DF	Andrei Semyonov	8	1	3	0	11	1
18	(Slovenia)	FW	Ladislav Almási	1	0	0	0	1	0
20	(Croatia)	DF	Zoran Nižić	3	0	0	0	3	0
23	(Russia)	MF	Anton Shvets	12	2	3	0	15	2
24	(Russia)	DF	Maksim Nenakhov	13	1	3	1	16	2
29	(Russia)	FW	Vladimir Ilyin	6	0	1	0	7	0
38	(Russia)	DF	Nikita Karmayev	1	0	0	0	1	0
55	(Russia)	DF	Aleksandr Putsko	2	0	0	0	2	0
59	(Russia)	MF	Yevgeni Kharin	4	0	0	0	4	0
88	(Russia)	GK	Giorgi Shelia	1	0	0	0	1	0
90	(Russia)	FW	Islam Alsultanov	1	0	0	0	1	0
94	(Russia)	MF	Artyom Timofeyev	9	1	1	0	10	1
95	(Russia)	FW	Abubakar Kadyrov	1	0	0	0	1	0
96	(Kazakhstan)	DF	Marat Bystrov	4	1	1	0	5	1
99	(Russia)	MF	Lechi Sadulayev	4	0	1	0	5	0
Players away on loan:
9	(Venezuela)	FW	Andrés Ponce	1	0	0	0	1	0
21	(Albania)	MF	Odise Roshi	2	0	0	0	2	0
Players who left Akhmat Grozny during the season:
5	(Russia)	DF	Arsen Adamov	1	0	0	0	1	0
19	(Russia)	MF	Oleg Ivanov	1	0	0	0	1	0
Total				103	7	18	1	121	8
