= 2021–22 FC Akhmat Grozny season =

FC Akhmat Grozny
2021–22 season
- Chairman: Magomed Daudov
- Manager: Andrei Talalayev
- Stadium: Akhmat-Arena
- Premier League: 7th
- Russian Cup: Round of 32
- Top goalscorer: League: Daniil Utkin (9); All: Daniil Utkin (10)
- Highest home attendance: 11,318 vs Sochi (2 August 2021)
- Lowest home attendance: 4,618 vs Khimki (12 December 2021)
- Average home league attendance: 6,780 (14 May 2022)
Home colours	Away colours

The 2021–22 FC Akhmat Grozny season was the 13th successive season that the club played in the Russian Premier League, the highest tier of association football in Russia. They also played in the Russian Cup, but were eliminated in the first round.

== Season events ==
On 18 May, Akhmat Grozny announced the signing of Mohamed Konaté from Khimki, on a one-year contract with the option of an additional two years.

On 11 June, Daniil Utkin joined Akhmat Grozny on a season-long loan deal from Krasnodar.

On 23 June, Vitali Lystsov joined Akhmat Grozny on a season-long loan deal from Lokomotiv Moscow, Artyom Arkhipov joined on loan for the season from Kuban Krasnodar, and Odise Roshi left the club after his contract with terminated by mutual consent.

On 12 July, Igor Konovalov joined Akhmat Grozny on a season-long loan deal from Rubin Kazan.

On 24 July, Vladislav Karapuzov joined Akhmat Grozny on a season-long loan deal from Dynamo Moscow.

On 31 July, Artyom Timofeyev joined Akhmat Grozny on a permanent transfer from Spartak Moscow, having seen the previous season on loan at the club.

On 7 August, Andrés Ponce left Akhmat Grozny after his contract was terminated by mutual agreement.

On 3 September, Akhmat Grozny announced the season-long loan signing of Darko Todorović from Red Bull Salzburg.

On 7 September, Akhmat Grozny announced the signing of Senin Sebai from Khimki on a one-year contract, with the option to extend it for an additional season.

On 5 October, Mbengue unilaterally terminated his loan deal with Dinamo Minsk, and contract with Akhmat Grozny, to join Maccabi Petah Tikva.

On 17 February, Akhmat Grozny announced the signing of Aleksandr Troshechkin from Khimki on a contract until the summer of 2024.

On 3 March, Artem Polyarus terminated his contract with Akhmat Grozny.

== Squad ==
As of match played 21 May 2022

No.	Name	Nationality	Position	Date of birth (age)	Signed from	Signed in	Contract ends	Apps.	Goals
Goalkeepers
33	Vitali Gudiyev	(Russia)	GK	22 April 1995 (aged 27)	Alania Vladikavkaz	2014		49	0
42	Aleksandr Melikhov	(Russia)	GK	23 March 1998 (aged 24)	Tom Tomsk	2019	2024	5	0
88	Giorgi Shelia	(Russia)	GK	11 December 1988 (aged 33)	Tambov	2020	2022 (+1)	33	0
Defenders
4	Darko Todorović	(Bosnia and Herzegovina)	DF	5 May 1997 (aged 25)	loan from Red Bull Salzburg	2021	2022	18	0
5	Vitali Lystsov	(Russia)	DF	11 July 1995 (aged 26)	loan from Lokomotiv Moscow	2021	2022	15	1
8	Miroslav Bogosavac	(Serbia)	DF	14 October 1996 (aged 25)	Čukarički	2020	2024	67	0
15	Andrei Semyonov	(Russia)	DF	24 March 1989 (aged 33)	Amkar Perm	2014	2022	244	6
20	Zoran Nižić	(Croatia)	DF	11 October 1989 (aged 32)	Hajduk Split	2018		79	0
40	Rizvan Utsiyev	(Russia)	DF	7 February 1988 (aged 34)	Trainee	2005		274	8
55	Aleksandr Putsko	(Russia)	DF	24 February 1993 (aged 29)	Ufa	2020	2022	29	0
79	Turpal-Ali Ibishev	(Russia)	DF	18 February 2002 (aged 20)	Academy	2021		3	0
96	Marat Bystrov	(Kazakhstan)	DF	19 June 1992 (aged 29)	Ordabasy	2020	2022	52	0
Midfielders
7	Bernard Berisha	(Kosovo)	MF	24 October 1991 (aged 30)	Anzhi Makhachkala	2016	2023	123	16
11	Igor Konovalov	(Russia)	MF	8 July 1996 (aged 25)	loan from Rubin Kazan	2021	2022	27	3
17	Lechi Sadulayev	(Russia)	MF	8 January 2000 (aged 22)	Academy	2018		46	2
23	Anton Shvets	(Russia)	MF	26 April 1993 (aged 29)	Villarreal B	2017	2023	110	8
25	Aleksandr Troshechkin	(Russia)	MF	23 April 1996 (aged 26)	Khimki	2022	2024	10	3
47	Daniil Utkin	(Russia)	MF	12 October 1999 (aged 22)	loan from Krasnodar	2021	2022	29	10
59	Yevgeni Kharin	(Russia)	MF	11 June 1995 (aged 26)	Levadia Tallinn	2018	2022	85	5
77	Vladislav Karapuzov	(Russia)	MF	6 January 2000 (aged 22)	loan from Dynamo Moscow	2021	2022	31	1
92	Abubakar Inalkayev	(Russia)	MF	31 July 2004 (aged 17)	Academy	2021		5	0
93	Alvi Adilkhanov	(Russia)	MF	9 March 2003 (aged 19)	Youth Team	2021		1	0
94	Artyom Timofeyev	(Russia)	MF	12 January 1994 (aged 28)	Spartak Moscow	2021	2024	57	5
Forwards
9	Idris Umayev	(Russia)	FW	15 January 1999 (aged 23)	Trainee	2016		17	0
10	Khalid Kadyrov	(Russia)	FW	19 April 1994 (aged 28)	Trainee	2010		26	1
13	Mohamed Konaté	(Burkina Faso)	FW	12 December 1997 (aged 24)	Khimki	2021	2022(+2)	27	8
18	Senin Sebai	(Ivory Coast)	FW	18 December 1993 (aged 28)	Khimki	2021	2022	19	3
68	Artyom Arkhipov	(Russia)	FW	15 December 1996 (aged 25)	loan from Kuban Krasnodar	2021	2022	18	0
90	Islam Alsultanov	(Russia)	FW	18 August 2001 (aged 20)	Trainee	2017		12	1
95	Abubakar Kadyrov	(Russia)	FW	26 August 1996 (aged 25)	Trainee	2012		4	1
Away on loan
6	Amir Aduyev	(Russia)	MF	11 May 1999 (aged 23)	Montpellier	2020		12	1
9	Gabriel Iancu	(Romania)	FW	15 April 1994 (aged 28)	Viitorul Constanța	2021	2024	14	2
38	Nikita Karmayev	(Russia)	DF	17 July 2000 (aged 21)	Youth Team	2018		6	0
	Konrad Michalak	(Poland)	MF	19 September 1997 (aged 24)	Lechia Gdańsk	2019	2023	8	1
	Ilya Moseychuk	(Russia)	MF	19 March 2000 (aged 22)	Tekstilshchik Ivanovo	2020		0	0
Players that left Akhmat Grozny during the season
14	Artem Polyarus	(Ukraine)	MF	5 July 1992 (aged 29)	Khimki	2020	2023	25	3
17	Ablaye Mbengue	(Senegal)	FW	19 May 1992 (aged 30)	Sapins	2015	2022	112	23
52	Akhmed Bunkhoev	(Russia)	GK	1 January 2001 (aged 21)	Akademia Ramzan	2018		0	0
	Ravanelli	(Brazil)	MF	29 August 1997 (aged 24)	Ponte Preta	2017	2022	37	5
	Andrés Ponce	(Venezuela)	FW	11 November 1996 (aged 25)	Anzhi Makhachkala	2019	2023	30	3

=== On loan ===
Note: Flags indicate national team as defined under FIFA eligibility rules; some limited exceptions apply. Players may hold more than one non-FIFA nationality.

No.	Pos.	Nation	Player
—	DF	RUS	Nikita Karmayev (at Kuban Krasnodar until June 2022)
—	MF	POL	Konrad Michalak (at Konyaspor)

No.	Pos.	Nation	Player
—	FW	ROU	Gabriel Iancu (at FCV Farul Constanța until June 2022)
—	FW	RUS	Ilya Moseychuk (at Tekstilshchik Ivanovo until June 2022)

== Transfers ==
=== In ===
Date	Position	Nationality	Name	From	Fee	Ref.
18 May 2021	FW	(Burkina Faso)	Mohamed Konaté	Khimki	Undisclosed	
31 July 2021	MF	(Russia)	Artyom Timofeyev	Spartak Moscow	Undisclosed	
7 September 2021	FW	(Ivory Coast)	Senin Sebai	Khimki	Undisclosed	
17 February 2022	MF	(Russia)	Aleksandr Troshechkin	Khimki	Undisclosed	

=== Loans in ===
Date from	Position	Nationality	Name	From	Date to	Ref.
11 June 2021	MF	(Russia)	Daniil Utkin	Krasnodar	31 May 2022	
23 June 2021	DF	(Russia)	Vitali Lystsov	Lokomotiv Moscow	31 May 2022	
23 June 2021	FW	(Russia)	Artyom Arkhipov	Kuban Krasnodar	31 May 2022	
12 July 2021	MF	(Russia)	Igor Konovalov	Rubin Kazan	31 May 2022	
24 July 2021	MF	(Russia)	Vladislav Karapuzov	Dynamo Moscow	31 May 2022	
3 September 2021	DF	(Bosnia and Herzegovina)	Darko Todorović	Red Bull Salzburg	31 May 2022	

=== Out ===
Date	Position	Nationality	Name	To	Fee	Ref.
3 June 2021	DF	(Russia)	Maksim Nenakhov	Lokomotiv Moscow	Undisclosed	
11 June 2021	FW	(Russia)	Vladimir Ilyin	Krasnodar	Undisclosed	
9 September 2021	GK	(Russia)	Akhmed Bunkhoev	Labëria	Undisclosed	
20 January 2022	MF	(Brazil)	Ravanelli	São Bernardo	Undisclosed	

=== Loans out ===
Date from	Position	Nationality	Name	To	Date to	Ref.
25 March 2021	MF	(Brazil)	Ravanelli	Chapecoense	December 2021	
29 March 2021	FW	(Senegal)	Ablaye Mbengue	Dinamo Minsk	5 October 2021	
31 July 2021	FW	(Russia)	Idris Umayev	Shakhter Karagandy	31 December 2021	
17 August 2021	MF	(Poland)	Konrad Michalak	Konyaspor	End of season	
3 February 2022	FW	(Romania)	Gabriel Iancu	Farul Constanța	End of season	
24 February 2022	MF	(Russia)	Amir Aduyev	Shakhter Karagandy	End of 2022	

=== Released ===
Date	Position	Nationality	Name	Joined	Date	Ref.
23 June 2021	MF	(Albania)	Odise Roshi	Boluspor	9 August 2021	
7 August 2021	FW	(Venezuela)	Andrés Ponce	Vejle	31 August 2021	
5 October 2021	FW	(Senegal)	Ablaye Mbengue	Al-Arabi	7 April 2022	
3 March 2022	MF	(Ukraine)	Artem Polyarus	Bruk-Bet Termalica Nieciecza	15 March 2022	
31 May 2022	GK	(Russia)	Vitali Gudiyev	Khimki	14 July 2022	
31 May 2022	DF	(Russia)	Aleksandr Putsko	Baltika Kaliningrad	23 July 2022	
31 May 2022	FW	(Ivory Coast)	Senin Sebai	Ironi Kiryat Shmona	7 June 2022	

=== Trial ===
Date From	Position	Nationality	Name	Last club	Date To	Ref.
27 June 2021	MF	(Kazakhstan)	Yan Vorogovsky	K Beerschot VA	Undisclosed	

== Friendlies ==
5 July 2021	Akhmat Grozny	2 – 0	Shinnik Yaroslavl	Novogorsk
14:00 MSK (UTC+3)	Alsultanov; Aduyev	Report		Stadium: Dynamo Training Ground

12 July 2021	Akhmat Grozny (Russia)	1 – 2	(Czech Republic) Slovan Liberec	Austria
17:00 MSK (UTC+3)	Konaté 7' (pen.); Utkin (penalty missed) 19'	Report	J.Kranthove (yellow card) 6'; Havelka 32'; Matoušek 37'; K.Michal (yellow card) 67'

12 July 2021	Akhmat Grozny (Russia)	1 – 3	(Czech Republic) Bohemians 1905	Austria
17:00 MSK (UTC+3)	Alsultanov 6'	Report	M.Koubek 20'; Kovařík 67'; V.Novák 86'

18 July 2021	Akhmat Grozny (Russia)	0 – 0	(Hungary) Haladás	Austria
17:00 MSK (UTC+3)		Report

19 July 2021	Akhmat Grozny (Russia)	2 – 2	(Saudi Arabia) Al Fateh	Austria
17:00 MSK (UTC+3)	Kharin 22'; Konovalov 86'	Report	Batna 5'; Al-Zaqaan 75'

22 January 2022	Akhmat Grozny (Russia)	1 – 2	(Poland) Lechia Gdańsk	Turkey
MSK (UTC+3)	Utkin 55'	Report	Paixão 75'; Terrazzino 102'

31 January 2022	Akhmat Grozny (Russia)	0 – 1	(Kosovo) Llapi	Turkey
11:00 MSK (UTC+3)		Report	Bianor 59'
Note: Match consisted of two 40 minute halves

31 January 2022	Akhmat Grozny (Russia)	2 – 2	(North Macedonia) Shkupi	Turkey
17:00 MSK (UTC+3)	Polyarus 29'; Sebai 59'	Report	F.Álvarez (penalty missed) 44'; Imeri 55'; Gjorgjievski 58'
Note: Match consisted of two 40 minute halves

6 February 2022	Akhmat Grozny	3 – 3	Fakel Voronezh	Turkey
11:00 MSK (UTC+3)	Ibishev 7'; Konovalov 61'; Sadulayev 63'	Report	Akbashev 47'; Maksimov 83'; Magal 88'

6 February 2022	Akhmat Grozny	2 – 0	Alania Vladikavkaz	Turkey
17:00 MSK (UTC+3)	Shvets 37'; Zaseyev 39' (o.g.)	Report

15 February 2022	Chayka Peschanokopskoye	1 – 3	Akhmat Grozny	Turkey
11:30 MSK (UTC+3)	D.Gribanov 30' (pen.)	Report	Arkhipov 26'; Timofeyev 48', 63'

19 February 2022	Akhmat Grozny	5 – 0	Volgar Astrakhan	Turkey
MSK (UTC+3)	Utkin; Konovalov; Troshechkin; Alsultanov	Report

== Competitions ==
=== Overview ===
Competition	First match	Last match	Starting round	Final position	Record							
Competition	First match	Last match	Starting round	Final position	Pld	W	D	L	GF	GA	GD	Win %
Premier League	25 July 2021	21 May 2022	Matchday 1	7th	30	13	3	14	36	38	−2	43.33
Russian Cup	22 September 2021	27 October 2021	Round of 32	Round of 32	2	1	1	0	4	1	+3	50.00
Total					32	14	4	14	40	39	+1	43.75

Last updated: 21 May 2022
Source: Competitions

=== Premier League ===
==== Results summary ====
Overall								Home						Away					
Pld	W	D	L	GF	GA	GD	Pts	W	D	L	GF	GA	GD	W	D	L	GF	GA	GD
30	13	3	14	36	38	−2	42	9	0	6	23	17	+6	4	3	8	13	21	−8

Last updated: 21 May 2022.
Source: See Results

==== Results by round ====
Round	1	2	3	4	5	6	7	8	9	10	11	12	13	14	15	16	17	18	19	20	21	22	23	24	25	26	27	28	29	30
Ground	A	H	A	H	A	H	A	H	A	H	A	H	А	H	А	Н	A	H	H	H	A	H	A	H	A	A	H	A	H	A
Result	W	L	L	W	L	W	L	L	W	L	L	W	L	W	W	W	L	W	W	L	D	L	D	L	L	L	W	W	W	D
Position	5	10	9	9	10	8	10	11	9	11	11	10	10	10	9	7	7	7	5	7	6	8	7	8	8	9	8	8	7	7

Updated to match(es) played on 21 May 2022. Source: See Results
A = Away; H = Home; W = Win; D = Draw; L = Loss

==== Results ====
25 July 2021 1	Krylia Sovetov	1 – 2	Akhmat Grozny	Samara
19:00 MSK (UTC+3)	Sarveli 49'; Ivanisenya (yellow card) 54'; Prutsev (yellow card) 90+3'	Report	Utkin 6' (yellow card) 35'; Konaté 20'; Shvets (yellow card) 23'; Nižić (yellow card) 62'	Stadium: Solidarnost Arena; Attendance: 500; Referee: Kirill Levnikov

2 August 2021 2	Akhmat Grozny	1 – 2	Sochi	Grozny
20:00 MSK (UTC+3)	Lystsov (yellow card) 14'; Iancu 86'	Report	Utkin 26' (o.g.); Dugandžić (yellow card) 30' (goal) 59'; Noboa (yellow card) 90'; Popov (yellow card) 90+'	Stadium: Akhmat-Arena; Attendance: 11,318; Referee: Ivan Sidenkov

8 August 2021 3	Rubin Kazan	2 – 1	Akhmat Grozny	Kazan
20:00 MSK (UTC+3)	Zotov (yellow card) 6'; Uremović (yellow card) 21'; Jevtić (yellow card) 33'; Hakšabanović 58'; Iancu 86' (o.g.); Begić (yellow card) 90+'	Report	Bystrov (yellow card) 9'; Utkin 31'; Konaté (yellow card) 44'; Lystsov (yellow card) 51'; Sheliya (red card) 53'; Nižić (yellow card) 76'	Stadium: Ak Bars Arena; Attendance: 8,147; Referee: Pavel Kukuyan

14 August 2021 4	Dynamo Moscow	2 – 1	Akhmat Grozny	Moscow
20:00 MSK (UTC+3)	Utkin 35'; Karapuzov 37' (yellow card) 42'; Nižić (yellow card) 45+'; Alsultanov (yellow card) 74'; Sheliya (yellow card) 85'	Report	Laxalt (yellow card) 34'; Makarov (yellow card) 45+'; Szymański 48'; Varela (yellow card) 61'; Skopintsev (yellow card) 72'; Ordets (yellow card) 90+'	Stadium: VTB Arena; Attendance: 7,069; Referee: Sergey Ivanov

21 August 2021 5	CSKA Moscow	2 – 0	Akhmat Grozny	Moscow
18:00 MSK (UTC+3)	Fernandes (yellow card) 18'; Mukhin (yellow card) 28'; Maradishvili (yellow card) 68'; Yakovlev 71'; Ejuke 75'	Report	Kharin (yellow card) 13' (yellow-red card) 23'; Berisha (yellow card) 28'	Stadium: VEB Arena; Attendance: 1,915; Referee: Sergei Karasev

26 August 2021 6	Akhmat Grozny	2 – 1	Arsenal Tula	Grozny
20:30 MSK (UTC+3)	Konaté 31' (yellow card) 63'; Utsiyev (yellow card) 84'; Konovalov 90+'	Report	Radaković (yellow card) 31'; Smolnikov (yellow card) 31'; Stepanov 38'; Panchenko (yellow card) 80'	Stadium: Akhmat-Arena; Attendance: 7,517; Referee: Alexey Sukhoi

11 September 2021 7	Zenit St.Petersburg	3 – 1	Akhmat Grozny	Saint Petersburg
16:30 MSK (UTC+3)	Wendel 9' (yellow card) 71'; Yerokhin 33'; Malcom 83'	Report	Todorović (yellow card) 20'; Utsiyev (yellow card) 39'; Polyarus (yellow card) 45'; Konaté 51'	Stadium: Krestovsky Stadium; Attendance: 7,516; Referee: Evgeny Kukulyak

18 September 2021 8	Akhmat Grozny	0 – 2	Krasnodar	Grozny
19:00 MSK (UTC+3)	Nižić (yellow card) 55' (yellow-red card) 65'	Report	Spertsyan (yellow card) 23'; Cabella 41'; Ilyin 44'; Ramírez (yellow card) 68'; Kornyushin (yellow card) 80'	Stadium: Akhmat-Arena; Attendance: 7,399; Referee: Ivan Sidenkov

26 September 2021 9	Rostov	1 – 2	Akhmat Grozny	Rostov-on-Don
16:30 MSK (UTC+3)	Melyokhin (yellow card) 71'; Poyarkov (yellow card) 78'; Poloz 90+'	Report	Semyonov (yellow card) 29'; Lystsov 36'; Konaté (yellow card) 43'; Konovalov 53' (pen.); Polyarus (yellow card) 64'; Kharin (yellow card) 72'; Utkin (yellow card) 74'	Stadium: Rostov Arena; Attendance: 3,903; Referee: Vasily Kazartsev

3 October 2021 10	Akhmat Grozny	0 – 1	Spartak Moscow	Grozny
19:00 MSK (UTC+3)	Utsiyev (yellow card) 38'; Konovalov (yellow card) 55'	Report	Litvinov (yellow card) 39'; Sobolev 41'; Bakayev (penalty missed) 68'; Moses (yellow card) 71'; Ayrton (yellow card) 83'; Lomovitsky (yellow card) 90+'	Stadium: Akhmat-Arena; Attendance: 7,640; Referee: Kirill Levnikov

17 October 2021 11	Khimki	2 – 0	Akhmat Grozny	Khimki
16:30 MSK (UTC+3)	Kukharchuk (yellow card) 2' (goal) 12'; Mirzov (yellow card) 63'; Dolgov 90'	Report	Konovalov (yellow card) 35'; Bystrov (yellow card) 68'; Semyonov (yellow card) 71'; Nižić (yellow card) 90+'	Stadium: Arena Khimki; Attendance: 480; Referee: Pavel Shadykhanov

24 October 2012 12	Akhmat Grozny	1 – 0	Ural Yekaterinburg	Grozny
16:30 MSK (UTC+3)	Sebai 71'; Timofeyev (yellow card) 76'	Report	Gerasimov (yellow card) 29'	Stadium: Akhmat-Arena; Attendance: 6,389; Referee: Sergei Karasev

31 October 2021 13	Ufa	1 – 0	Akhmat Grozny	Ufa
14:00 MSK (UTC+3)	Lystsov (yellow card) 50'; Agalarov 58'; Urunov (yellow card) 72'	Report	Mrzljak (yellow card) 44'; Timofeyev (yellow card) 72'; Sebai (yellow card) 90+'	Stadium: BetBoom Arena; Attendance: 409; Referee: Alexey Amelin

7 November 2021 14	Akhmat Grozny	3 – 1	Nizhny Novgorod	Grozny
19:00 MSK (UTC+3)	Konovalov (yellow card) 14'; Konaté 39'; Penchikov 72' (o.g.); Sadulayev (yellow card) 79'; Utkin 90'	Report	Kalinsky (yellow card) 37'; Kosarev 54'	Stadium: Akhmat-Arena; Attendance: 6,729; Referee: Vladislav Bezborodov

20 November 2021 15	Lokomotiv Moscow	1 – 2	Akhmat Grozny	Moscow
16:30 MSK (UTC+3)	Murilo (red card) 35'; Kerk (yellow card) 43'; Pablo (yellow card) 63'; Lisakovich 64'; Guilherme (yellow card) 67'; Chyorny (yellow card) 89'; Kamano (yellow card) 90+'	Report	Utkin 36'; Nižić (yellow card) 52'; Polyarus 58'; Lystsov (yellow card) 65'; Konovalov (yellow card) 67'	Stadium: RZD Arena; Attendance: 3,912; Referee: Sergey Ivanov

27 November 2021 16	Akhmat Grozny	2 – 0	Rostov	Grozny
16:30 MSK (UTC+3)	Polyarus 26' (pen.); Shvets (yellow card) 45+'; Timofeyev (yellow card) 52'; Kharin (yellow card) 57'; Sebai 76'	Report	Glebov (yellow card) 41'; Shchetinin (yellow card) 78'	Stadium: Akhmat-Arena; Attendance: 5,557; Referee: Vladislav Bezborodov

4 December 2021 17	Spartak Moscow	2 – 1	Akhmat Grozny	Moscow
17:00 MSK (UTC+3)	Moses 13'; Sobolev (red card) 32'; Promes (yellow card) 65' (goal) 87'; Gigot (yellow card) 72'; Ayrton (yellow card) 89'; Selikhov (yellow card) 90+'	Report	Konovalov (yellow card) 5'; Semyonov (yellow card) 38'; Utkin 45+'; Arkhipov (yellow card) 49'	Stadium: Otkritie Arena; Attendance: 5,850; Referee: Vitali Meshkov

12 December 2021 18	Akhmat Grozny	4 – 1	Khimki	Grozny
16:30 MSK (UTC+3)	Timofeyev 19' (pen.), 45+' (pen.); Konaté 50' (pen.), 65'	Report	Kukharchuk (yellow card) 12'; Bozhenov (yellow card) 49'; Troshechkin 66'	Stadium: Akhmat-Arena; Attendance: 4,618; Referee: Alexey Amelin

27 February 2022 19	Akhmat Grozny	2 – 1	Ufa	Grozny
19:00 MSK (UTC+3)	Utkin (yellow card) 9'; Konovalov 51' (pen.); Semyonov (yellow card) 67'; Troshechkin 84'	Report	Jokić (yellow card) 27'; Fishchenko (yellow card) 29'; Zhuravlyov 45+1'; Cacintura (yellow card) 49'; Kamilov (yellow card) 54'; Agalarov (yellow card) 67'; Rodrigues (yellow card) 68'	Stadium: Akhmat-Arena; Attendance: 6,612; Referee: Aleksey Sukhoi

7 March 2022 20	Akhmat Grozny	1 – 2	Rubin Kazan	Grozny
19:00 MSK (UTC+3)	Utkin 3'; Timofeyev (yellow card) 21'; Sebai (yellow card) 63'; Arkhipov (yellow card) 88'	Report	Samoshnikov (yellow card) 43'; Lisakovich 50'; Uremović (yellow card) 51'; Begić (yellow card) 85'; Dreyer 90+1'	Stadium: Akhmat-Arena; Attendance: 6,722; Referee: Vladimir Moskalyov

13 March 2022 21	Ural Yekaterinburg	0 – 0	Akhmat Grozny	Yekaterinburg
12:00 MSK (UTC+3)	Miškić (yellow card) 44'	Report		Stadium: Central Stadium; Attendance: 3,572; Referee: Sergei Karasev

19 March 2022 22	Akhmat Grozny	2 – 3	Lokomotiv Moscow	Grozny
16:30 MSK (UTC+3)	Shvets (yellow card) 2'; Troshechkin 20'; Timofeyev (yellow card) 39'; Utkin 45+3'; Konovalov (yellow card) 58'	Report	Zhemaletdinov 10' (yellow card) 37'; Kuchta (yellow card) 13' (goal) 62'; Kerk (yellow card) 27'; Mampassi (yellow card) 45'; Barinov (yellow card) 45+2'; Khudyakov (yellow card) 47'; Isidor 54'	Stadium: Akhmat-Arena; Attendance: 5,488; Referee: Vasily Kazartsev

2 April 2022 23	Arsenal Tula	0 – 0	Akhmat Grozny	Tula
14:00 MSK (UTC+3)	Čaušić (red card) 45+'; Panchenko (yellow card) 64'	Report	Todorović (yellow card) 90+'	Stadium: Arsenal Stadium; Attendance: 3,244; Referee: Vitali Meshkov

9 April 2022 24	Akhmat Grozny	0 – 2	Zenit St.Petersburg	Grozny
19:30 MSK (UTC+3)	Shvets (yellow card) 36'; Utkin (yellow card) 38'; Berisha (yellow card) 45+'; Bogosavac (yellow card) 49'; Semyonov (yellow card) 74'; Sebai (yellow card) 88'	Report	Alberto 39' (yellow card) 85'; Barrios (yellow card) 50'; Yerokhin 90'; Kuzyayev (yellow card) 90+'	Stadium: Akhmat-Arena; Attendance: 6,750; Referee: Alexey Matyunin

15 April 2022 25	Dynamo Moscow	2 – 0	Akhmat Grozny	Moscow
19:30 MSK (UTC+3)	Moro (yellow card) 43'; Smolov 59'; Tyukavin 79'	Report	Troshechkin (yellow card) 31'; Sebai (yellow card) 50'; Umayev (yellow card) 83'	Stadium: VTB Arena; Attendance: 15,682; Referee: Sergey Ivanov

23 April 2022 26	Sochi	3 – 2	Akhmat Grozny	Sochi
19:00 MSK (UTC+3)	Yusupov (yellow card) 27' (goal) 57'; Burmistrov (yellow card) 51'; Cassierra 53'; Terekhov (yellow card) 81' (goal) 84'	Report	Sadulayev 31' (yellow card) 45+'; Sebai 66'; Bogosavac (yellow card) 70'; Todorović (yellow card) 81'; Semyonov (yellow card) 89'	Stadium: Fisht Olympic Stadium; Attendance: 4,853; Referee: Kirill Levnikov

1 May 2022 27	Akhmat Grozny	2 – 0	CSKA Moscow	Grozny
19:00 MSK (UTC+3)	Sadulayev (yellow card) 45+'; Utkin 46'; Semyonov (yellow card) 63'; Berisha 90+'; Bystrov (yellow card) 90+'	Report	Yazıcı (yellow card) 38'	Stadium: Akhmat-Arena; Attendance: 5,161; Referee: Vitali Meshkov

7 May 2022 28	Nizhny Novgorod	0 – 1	Akhmat Grozny	Nizhny Novgorod
16:30 MSK (UTC+3)	Gotsuk (yellow card) 18'; Gorbunov (yellow card) 81'	Report	Berisha (yellow card) 29'; Utsiyev (red card) 53'; Troshechkin 74'; Bogosavac (yellow card) 89'; Sheliya (yellow card) 90'	Stadium: Nizhny Novgorod Stadium; Attendance: 7,116; Referee: Jan Bobrovsky

14 May 2022 29	Akhmat Grozny	1 – 0	Krylia Sovetov	Grozny
19:00 MSK (UTC+3)	Semyonov (yellow card) 21' (yellow-red card) 56'; Timofeyev (yellow card) 26'; Berisha (yellow card) 44'; Konaté 54'; Sheliya (yellow card) 90+'	Report	Fernando (yellow card) 31'; Gorshkov (penalty missed) 60'; Barać (yellow card) 90+'	Stadium: Akhmat-Arena; Attendance: 6,737; Referee: Alexey Amelin

21 May 2022 30	Krasnodar	1 – 1	Akhmat Grozny	Krasnodar
17:00 MSK (UTC+3)	Stezhko (yellow card) 21'; Spertsyan 90+'	Report	Utkin (yellow card) 39'; Umayev (yellow card) 44' (penalty missed) 45+'; Konaté 67'; Bogosavac (yellow card) 90+'; Todorović (yellow card) 90+'	Stadium: Krasnodar Arena; Attendance: 22,227; Referee: Pavel Shadykhanov

==== League table ====
Pos	Team	Pld	W	D	L	GF	GA	GD	Pts
5	CSKA Moscow	30	15	5	10	42	29	+13	50 (Note: Head-to-head points: Krasnodar 4, CSKA Moscow 1.)
6	Lokomotiv Moscow	30	13	9	8	43	39	+4	48
7	Akhmat Grozny	30	13	3	14	36	38	−2	42
8	Krylia Sovetov Samara	30	12	5	13	39	36	+3	41
9	Rostov	30	10	8	12	47	51	−4	38 (Note: Head-to-head points: Rostov 4, Spartak Moscow 1.)

Source: Premier Liga
Rules for classification: 1) Points; 2) Head-to-head points; 3) Head-to-head matches won; 4) Head-to-head goal difference; 5) Head-to-head goals scored; 6) Matches won; 7) Goal difference; 8) Goals scored; 9) 2020–21 position (not applicable to final standings); 10) Play-off.

=== Russian Cup ===
==== Round of 32 ====
Pos	Team	Pld	W	PW	PL	L	GF	GA	GD	Pts	Final result
1	Rotor Volgograd (Q)	2	1	1	0	0	4	1	+3	5	Advance to Play-off
2	Akhmat Grozny	2	1	0	1	0	4	1	+3	4	
3	Kairat Moscow	2	0	0	0	2	0	6	−6	0	

Rules for classification: 1) Points; 2) Wins; 3) Goal differential; 4) Goals scored; 5) Head-to-head result; 6) Disciplinary points.
(Q) Qualified to the phase indicated

22 September 2021 2	Kairat Moscow	0 – 3	Akhmat Grozny	Moscow
16:00 MSK (UTC+3)	A.Savinov (yellow card) 36'; R.Emirov (yellow card) 56'; V.Hayrapetyan (yellow card) 65'	Report	A.Kadyrov 18' (pen.); Arkhipov (yellow card) 46'; Iancu 57' (pen.); Aduyev (yellow card) 74' (goal) 79'	Stadium: Central Stadium

27 October 2021 3	Rotor Volgograd	1 – 1 (4 – 1 p)	Akhmat Grozny	Volgograd
14:00 MSK (UTC+3)	Pervushin 37'	Report	Aduyev (yellow card) 58'; Utkin 80'; Putsko (yellow card) 86'	Stadium: Volgograd Arena
	Penalties
	Unknown (penalty scored); Unknown (penalty scored); Unknown (penalty scored); Unknown (penalty scored)		(penalty missed) Unknown; (penalty scored) Unknown; (penalty scored) Unknown; (penalty missed) Unknown

== Squad statistics ==
As of match played 21 May 2022

=== Appearances and goals ===
No.	Pos	Nat	Player	Total		Premier League		Russian Cup	
No.	Pos	Nat	Player	Apps	Goals	Apps	Goals	Apps	Goals
4	DF	(Bosnia and Herzegovina) BIH	Darko Todorović	18	0	14+3	0	1	0
5	DF	(Russia) RUS	Vitali Lystsov	15	1	11+2	1	1+1	0
7	MF	(Kosovo) KOS	Bernard Berisha	13	1	11+2	1	0	0
8	DF	(Serbia) SRB	Miroslav Bogosavac	25	0	23+1	0	0+1	0
9	FW	(Russia) RUS	Idris Umayev	11	0	2+9	0	0	0
10	FW	(Russia) RUS	Khalid Kadyrov	1	0	0+1	0	0	0
11	MF	(Russia) RUS	Igor Konovalov	27	3	16+9	3	2	0
13	FW	(Burkina Faso) BFA	Mohamed Konaté	27	8	16+11	8	0	0
15	DF	(Russia) RUS	Andrei Semyonov	27	0	25+2	0	0	0
17	MF	(Russia) RUS	Lechi Sadulayev	17	1	6+9	1	2	0
18	FW	(Ivory Coast) CIV	Senin Sebai	19	3	4+13	3	2	0
20	DF	(Croatia) CRO	Zoran Nižić	21	0	17+3	0	1	0
23	MF	(Russia) RUS	Anton Shvets	18	0	13+5	0	0	0
25	MF	(Russia) RUS	Aleksandr Troshechkin	10	3	9+1	3	0	0
33	GK	(Russia) RUS	Vitali Gudiyev	14	0	14	0	0	0
40	DF	(Russia) RUS	Rizvan Utsiyev	12	0	8+3	0	1	0
42	GK	(Russia) RUS	Aleksandr Melikhov	3	0	0+1	0	2	0
47	MF	(Russia) RUS	Daniil Utkin	29	10	27+1	9	0+1	1
55	DF	(Russia) RUS	Aleksandr Putsko	8	0	3+3	0	2	0
59	MF	(Russia) RUS	Yevgeni Kharin	27	0	23+3	0	1	0
68	FW	(Russia) RUS	Artyom Arkhipov	18	0	5+11	0	0+2	0
77	MF	(Russia) RUS	Vladislav Karapuzov	31	1	9+20	1	1+1	0
79	DF	(Russia) RUS	Turpal-Ali Ibishev	3	0	0+2	0	0+1	0
88	GK	(Russia) RUS	Giorgi Shelia	16	0	16	0	0	0
90	FW	(Russia) RUS	Islam Alsultanov	3	0	0+3	0	0	0
92	MF	(Russia) RUS	Abubakar Inalkayev	5	0	0+4	0	0+1	0
94	MF	(Russia) RUS	Artyom Timofeyev	27	2	27	2	0	0
95	FW	(Russia) RUS	Abubakar Kadyrov	2	1	0	0	2	1
96	DF	(Kazakhstan) KAZ	Marat Bystrov	27	0	24+2	0	1	0
Players away from the club on loan:
6	MF	(Russia) RUS	Amir Aduyev	2	1	0	0	2	1
9	FW	(Romania) ROU	Gabriel Iancu	7	2	0+6	1	1	1
Players who appeared for Akhmat Grozny but left during the season:
14	MF	(Ukraine) UKR	Artem Polyarus	12	2	7+4	2	0+1	0

=== Goal scorers ===
Place	Position	Nation	Number	Name	Premier League	Russian Cup	Total
1	MF	(Russia)	47	Daniil Utkin	9	1	10
2	FW	(Burkina Faso)	13	Mohamed Konaté	8	0	8
3	MF	(Russia)	11	Igor Konovalov	3	0	3
3	FW	(Ivory Coast)	18	Senin Sebai	3	0	3
3	MF	(Russia)	25	Aleksandr Troshechkin	3	0	3
4	MF	(Ukraine)	14	Artem Polyarus	2	0	2
4	MF	(Russia)	94	Artyom Timofeyev	2	0	2
4	FW	(Romania)	9	Gabriel Iancu	1	1	2
9	MF	(Russia)	77	Vladislav Karapuzov	1	0	1
9	DF	(Russia)	5	Vitali Lystsov	1	0	1
9	MF	(Russia)	17	Lechi Sadulayev	1	0	1
9	MF	(Kosovo)	7	Bernard Berisha	1	0	1
9	FW	(Russia)	95	Abubakar Kadyrov	0	1	1
9	MF	(Russia)	6	Amir Aduyev	0	1	1
9				Own goal	1	0	1
Total					36	4	40

=== Clean sheets ===
Place	Position	Nation	Number	Name	Premier League	Russian Cup	Total
1	GK	(Russia)	88	Giorgi Shelia	5	0	5
2	GK	(Russia)	33	Vitali Gudiyev	2	0	2
3	GK	(Russia)	42	Aleksandr Melikhov	0	1	1
Total					7	1	8

=== Disciplinary record ===
Number	Nation	Position	Name	Premier League		Russian Cup		Total	
Number	Nation	Position	Name	Yellow card	Red card	Yellow card	Red card	Yellow card	Red card
4	(Bosnia and Herzegovina)	DF	Darko Todorović	4	0	0	0	4	0
5	(Russia)	DF	Vitali Lystsov	4	0	0	0	4	0
7	(Kosovo)	MF	Bernard Berisha	4	0	0	0	4	0
8	(Serbia)	DF	Miroslav Bogosavac	4	0	0	0	4	0
9	(Russia)	FW	Idris Umayev	2	0	0	0	2	0
11	(Russia)	MF	Igor Konovalov	6	0	0	0	6	0
13	(Burkina Faso)	FW	Mohamed Konaté	3	0	0	0	3	0
15	(Russia)	DF	Andrei Semyonov	9	1	0	0	9	1
17	(Russia)	MF	Lechi Sadulayev	3	0	0	0	3	0
18	(Ivory Coast)	FW	Senin Sebai	4	0	0	0	4	0
20	(Croatia)	DF	Zoran Nižić	7	1	0	0	7	1
23	(Russia)	MF	Anton Shvets	4	0	0	0	4	0
25	(Russia)	MF	Aleksandr Troshechkin	1	0	0	0	1	0
40	(Russia)	DF	Rizvan Utsiyev	3	1	0	0	3	1
47	(Russia)	MF	Daniil Utkin	5	0	0	0	5	0
55	(Russia)	DF	Aleksandr Putsko	0	0	1	0	1	0
59	(Russia)	MF	Yevgeni Kharin	4	1	0	0	4	1
68	(Russia)	FW	Artyom Arkhipov	2	0	1	0	3	0
77	(Russia)	MF	Vladislav Karapuzov	1	0	0	0	1	0
88	(Russia)	GK	Giorgi Shelia	3	1	0	0	3	1
90	(Russia)	FW	Islam Alsultanov	1	0	0	0	1	0
94	(Russia)	MF	Artyom Timofeyev	6	0	0	0	6	0
96	(Kazakhstan)	DF	Marat Bystrov	3	0	0	0	3	0
Players away on loan:
6	(Russia)	MF	Amir Aduyev	0	0	2	0	2	0
Players who left Akhmat Grozny during the season:
14	(Ukraine)	MF	Artem Polyarus	2	0	0	0	2	0
Total				85	5	4	0	89	5
