= Yevgeni Kharin =

Russian footballer

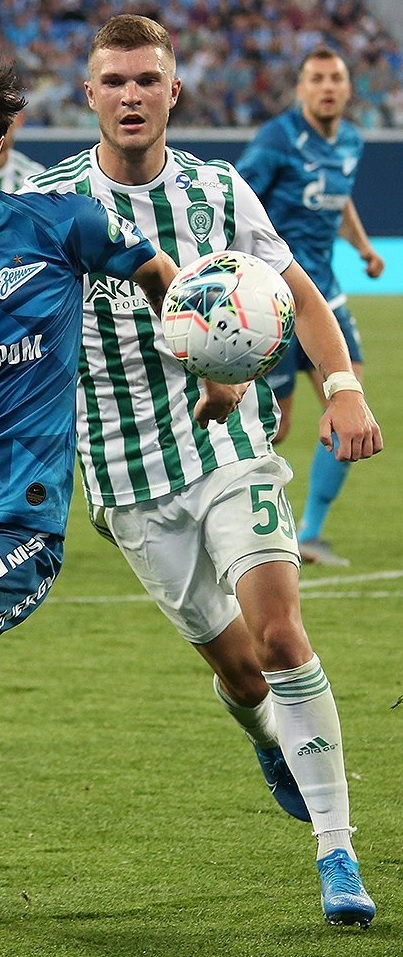
- Kharin with Akhmat Grozny in 2019

Personal information
- Full name: Yevgeni Valeryevich Kharin
- Date of birth: 11 June 1995 (age 31)
- Place of birth: Maardu, Estonia
- Height: 1.85 m (6 ft 1 in)
- Position: Left-back

Team information
- Current team: Ural Yekaterinburg
- Number: 59

Senior career*
Years	Team	Apps	(Gls)
2011–2017	FCI Tallinn	182	(49)
2018	Levadia Tallinn	19	(4)
2018–2025	Akhmat Grozny	123	(10)
2025–	Ural Yekaterinburg	19	(1)

International career^{‡}
2023–	Russia	1	(0)
- * Club domestic league appearances and goals as of 16 May 2026 ‡ National team caps and goals as of 12 October 2023

Yevgeni Valeryevich Kharin (Russian: Евгений Валерьевич Харин; born 11 June 1995) is a Russian professional football player who plays as a left-back for Ural Yekaterinburg.

== Club career ==
On 8 August 2018, Kharin signed a four-year contract with FC Akhmat Grozny. On 2 June 2022, he signed a new three-year contract with Akhmat. Kharin left Akhmat on 14 June 2025.

== International career ==
Kharin was called up to the Russia national football team for the first time in October 2023 for friendlies. He made his debut on 12 October 2023 against Cameroon.

== Career statistics ==
=== Club ===
As of match played 23 May 2026

Appearances and goals by club, season and competition
Club	Season	League			National Cup		Continental		Other		Total	
Club	Season	Division	Apps	Goals	Apps	Goals	Apps	Goals	Apps	Goals	Apps	Goals
FCI Tallinn	2011	Esiliiga	2	0	0	0	–		–		2	0
FCI Tallinn	2012	Esiliiga	34	8	1	0	–		–		35	8
FCI Tallinn	2013	Meistriliiga	29	2	1	0	–		–		30	2
FCI Tallinn	2014	Meistriliiga	27	5	3	0	–		–		30	5
FCI Tallinn	2015	Meistriliiga	30	9	0	0	–		–		30	9
FCI Tallinn	2016	Meistriliiga	30	9	0	0	2 (Note: Appearances in UEFA Europa League)	2	–		32	11
FCI Tallinn	2017	Meistriliiga	30	16	3	0	2 (Note: Appearances in UEFA Champions League)	0	0	0	35	16
FCI Tallinn	Total		182	49	8	0	4	2	0	0	194	51
Levadia Tallinn	2018	Meistriliiga	19	4	3	1	2	0	1 (Note: Appearance in Estonian Supercup)	0	25	5
Akhmat Grozny	2018–19	Russian Premier League	2	0	1	0	–		–		3	0
Akhmat Grozny	2019–20	Russian Premier League	22	2	2	0	–		–		24	2
Akhmat Grozny	2020–21	Russian Premier League	29	3	4	1	–		–		33	4
Akhmat Grozny	2021–22	Russian Premier League	26	0	1	0	–		–		27	0
Akhmat Grozny	2022–23	Russian Premier League	26	5	6	0	–		–		32	5
Akhmat Grozny	2023–24	Russian Premier League	16	0	4	0	–		–		20	0
Akhmat Grozny	2024–25	Russian Premier League	2	0	1	0	–		–		3	0
Akhmat Grozny	Total		123	10	19	1	0	0	0	0	142	11
Ural Yekaterinburg	2025–26	Russian First League	19	1	2	0	–		0	0	21	1
Career total			343	64	32	2	6	2	1	0	382	68

=== International ===
As of match played 12 October 2023

Appearances and goals by national team and year
National team	Year	Apps	Goals
Russia	2023	1	0
Total		1	0

== Honours ==
Individual

- Meistriliiga Player of the Month: June 2015
