= Idris Umayev =

Russian footballer (born 1999)

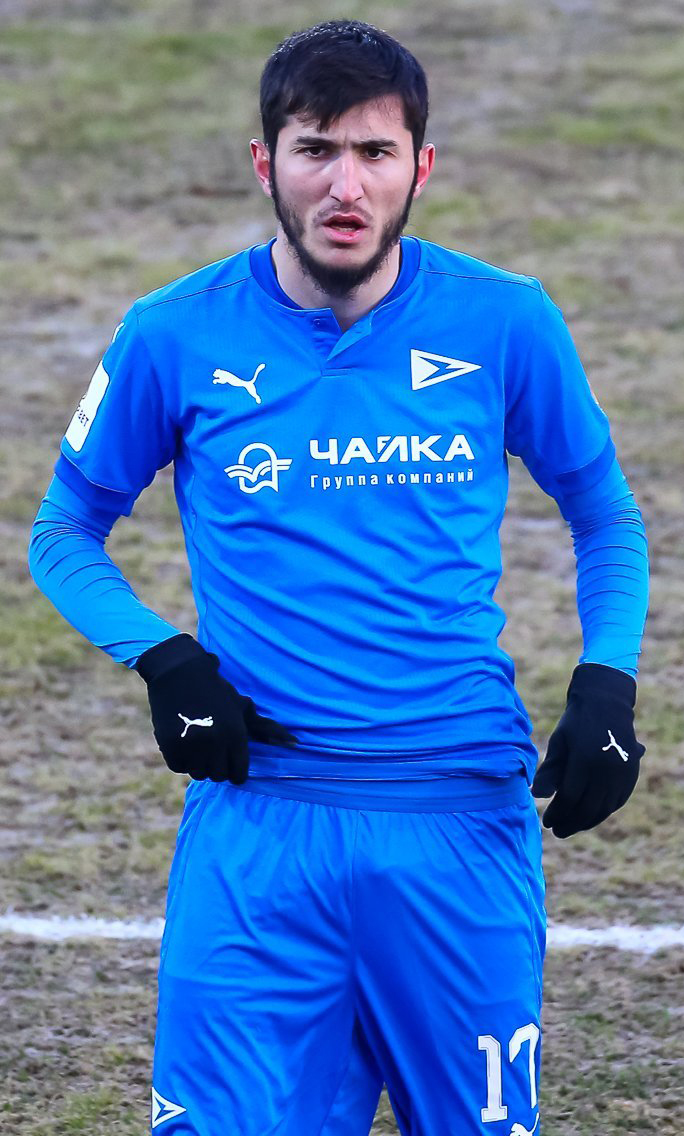
- Umayev with Chayka in 2021

Personal information
- Full name: Idris Ibragimovich Umayev
- Date of birth: 15 January 1999 (age 27)
- Place of birth: Komsomolskoye, Russia
- Height: 1.76 m (5 ft 9 in)
- Position: Forward

Team information
- Current team: Caspiy
- Number: 10

Senior career*
Years	Team	Apps	(Gls)
2016–2023	Akhmat Grozny	15	(0)
2019	→ Palanga (loan)	14	(7)
2019–2020	→ Khimki (loan)	11	(3)
2019–2020	→ Khimki-M (loan)	5	(1)
2020–2021	→ Chayka Peschanokopskoye (loan)	13	(5)
2021	→ Shakhter Karagandy (loan)	5	(3)
2022–2023	→ Yenisey Krasnoyarsk (loan)	11	(1)
2023	→ Aktobe (loan)	12	(2)
2024–2026	Aktobe	38	(8)
2026–	Caspiy	25	(2)

International career
2018–2019	Russia U-20	8	(0)
- * Club domestic league appearances and goals as of 1 November 2026

Idris Ibragimovich Umayev (Russian: Идрис Ибрагимович Умаев; born 15 January 1999) is a Russian football player who plays for Kazakhstan Premier League club Caspiy.

== Club career ==
Umayev made his debut for the main squad of Akhmat Grozny on 26 September 2018 in a Russian Cup game against FC SKA-Khabarovsk. He came on as a late substitute in extra time and scored the decisive penalty kick that won the penalty shoot-out for Akhmat.

On 31 January 2019, Umayev was sent on loan to the Lithuanian A Lyga club Palanga until 30 June 2019. IN 14 A lyga matches scored 7 goal and made one assist.

On 10 July 2019, Umayev joined FC Khimki on loan for the 2019–20 season. He made his Russian Football National League debut for Khimki on 13 July 2019 in a game against FC Avangard Kursk.

Umayev made his Russian Premier League debut for FC Akhmat Grozny on 9 August 2020 in a game against FC Arsenal Tula, as a starter. On 12 October 2020, Umayev moved to Chayka Peschanokopskoye on loan.

On 31 July 2021, Shakhter Karagandy announced the signing of Umayev. On the same day, Akhmat announced that the transfer is a loan until the end of 2021. On 8 September 2022, Umayev moved on loan to Yenisey Krasnoyarsk. On 22 February 2023, Umayev moved on a new loan to FC Aktobe in Kazakhstan.

On 23 August 2023, Umayev's contract with Akhmat was terminated by mutual consent.

== Personal life ==
His older brother Rasul Umayev is a former goalkeeper who was under contract with Akhmat Grozny but made no appearances for their senior squad.

== Honours ==
Individual

- A Lyga Young Player of the Month: April 2019

== Career statistics ==
As of 21 May 2022

Club	Season	League			Cup		Continental		Other		Total	
Club	Season	Division	Apps	Goals	Apps	Goals	Apps	Goals	Apps	Goals	Apps	Goals
Akhmat Grozny	2017–18	RPL	0	0	0	0	–		–		0	0
Akhmat Grozny	2018–19	RPL	0	0	1	0	–		–		1	0
Akhmat Grozny	2020–21	RPL	4	0	1	0	–		–		5	0
Akhmat Grozny	2021–22	RPL	11	0	–		–		–		11	0
Akhmat Grozny	Total		15	0	2	0	0	0	0	0	17	0
Palanga (loan)	2019	A Lyga	14	7	1	0	–		–		15	7
Khimki (loan)	2019–20	FNL	11	3	0	0	–		2 (Note: Appearances in the FNL Cup)	0	13	3
Khimki-M (loan)	2019–20	PFL	5	1	–		–		–		5	1
Chayka (loan)	2020–21	FNL	13	5	–		–		–		13	5
Shakhter Karagandy (loan)	2021	KPL	5	3	7	3	3 (Note: Appearances in the UEFA Europa Conference League)	1	–		15	7
Career total			63	19	10	3	3	1	2	0	78	23
