= Abubakar Inalkayev =

Russian football player

Personal information
- Full name: Abubakar Aslambekovich Inalkayev
- Date of birth: 31 July 2004 (age 22)
- Place of birth: Achkhoy-Martan, Russia
- Height: 1.85 m (6 ft 1 in)
- Position: Central midfielder

Team information
- Current team: Nart Cherkessk
- Number: 92

Youth career
- Akhmat Grozny

Senior career*
Years	Team	Apps	(Gls)
2021–2023	Akhmat Grozny	4	(0)
2024	Altona 94 II	13	(1)
2025	TBS Pinneberg	5	(0)
2025–2026	Kyzyltash Bakhchisaray		
2026	TSK-Tavriya		
2026–	Nart Cherkessk	13	(0)
- * Club domestic league appearances and goals as of 31 October 2026

Abubakar Aslambekovich Inalkayev (Russian: Абубакар Асламбекович Иналкаев; born 31 July 2004) is a Russian professional footballer who plays as a central midfielder for Nart Cherkessk.

== Club career ==
He made his debut for the main team of FC Akhmat Grozny on 22 September 2021 in a Russian Cup game against FC Kairat Moscow. He made his Russian Premier League debut for Akhmat on 26 September 2021 in a game against FC Rostov.

== Career statistics ==
As of 28 November 2022

Club	Season	League			Cup		Continental		Total	
Club	Season	Division	Apps	Goals	Apps	Goals	Apps	Goals	Apps	Goals
Akhmat Grozny	2021–22	RPL	4	0	1	0	–		5	0
Akhmat Grozny	2022–23	RPL	0	0	3	0	–		3	0
Career total			4	0	4	0	0	0	8	0
