= Miroslav Bogosavac =

Serbian footballer (born 1996)

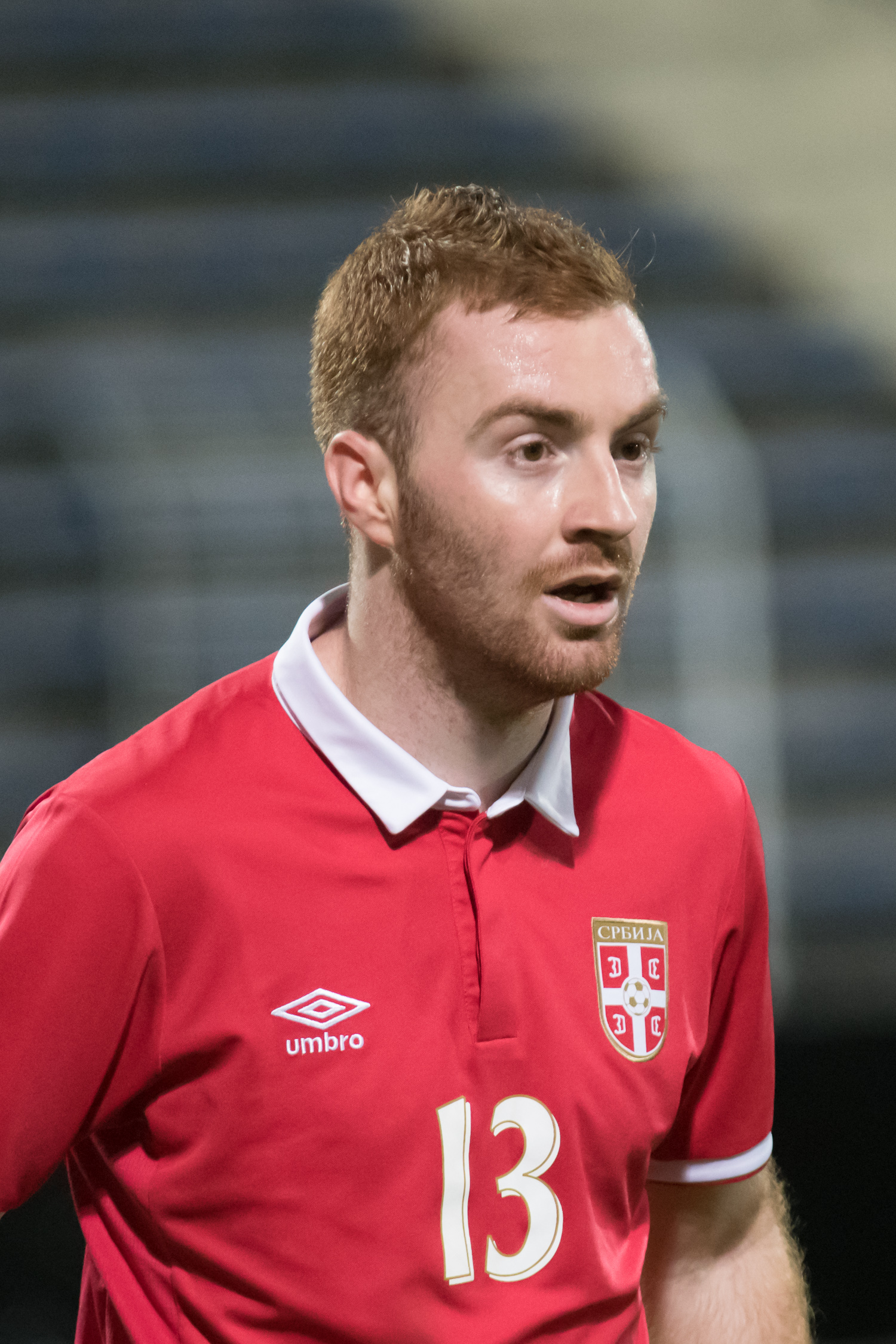
- Bogosavac with Serbia U21 in 2017

Personal information
- Date of birth: 14 October 1996 (age 30)
- Place of birth: Sremska Mitrovica, FR Yugoslavia
- Height: 1.76 m (5 ft 9 in)
- Position: Left-back

Team information
- Current team: Akhmat Grozny
- Number: 8

Youth career
- Sirmium
- 2008–2013: Partizan

Senior career*
Years	Team	Apps	(Gls)
2013–2017	Partizan	19	(0)
2013–2016	→ Teleoptik (loan)	57	(3)
2017–2020	Čukarički	92	(2)
2020	→ Akhmat Grozny (loan)	10	(0)
2020–	Akhmat Grozny	157	(0)

International career^{‡}
2014–2015	Serbia U19 (Note: Only official UEFA matches included)	4	(0)
2017–2019	Serbia U21	12	(0)
2019	Serbia	1	(0)
- * Club domestic league appearances and goals as of 23 October 2026 ‡ National team caps and goals as of 23 June 2019

Miroslav Bogosavac (Serbian Cyrillic: Мирослав Богосавац; born 14 October 1996) is a Serbian professional footballer who plays as a left-back for Russian club Akhmat Grozny.

== Club career ==
Born in Sremska Mitrovica, Bogosavac joined the youth academy of Partizan from Sirmium in 2008. He signed his first professional contract with the club on 14 August 2013, alongside Miladin Stevanović, penning a three-year deal. In order to gain experience, the duo was immediately assigned to affiliated team Teleoptik. They were both promoted back to Partizan in the 2015–16 campaign, with Bogosavac playing regularly under manager Ivan Tomić in the second half of the season.

In February 2017, Bogosavac was transferred to Čukarički on a three-year contract. He was selected in the 2017–18 Serbian SuperLiga Team of the Season due to his performances in the process.

On 14 February 2020, he joined Russian Premier League club Akhmat Grozny on loan until the end of the 2019–20 season, with an option to purchase. On 3 July 2020, Akhmat activated their purchase option and signed a four-year contract with Bogosavac.

== International career ==
Bogosavac represented Serbia at under-19 and under-21 level in UEFA competitions. He made his debut for Serbia national football team on 20 March 2019 in a friendly against Germany, as a starter.

== Career statistics ==
=== Club ===
As of match played 27 October 2026

Appearances and goals by club, season and competition
Club	Season	League			Cup		Continental		Total	
Club	Season	Division	Apps	Goals	Apps	Goals	Apps	Goals	Apps	Goals
Teleoptik (loan)	2013–14	Serbian First League	25	0	0	0	—		25	0
Teleoptik (loan)	2014–15	Serbian League Belgrade	21	3	—		—		21	3
Teleoptik (loan)	2015–16	Serbian League Belgrade	11	0	—		—		11	0
Teleoptik (loan)	Total		57	3	0	0	—		57	3
Partizan	2015–16	Serbian SuperLiga	16	0	4	0	0	0	20	0
Partizan	2016–17	Serbian SuperLiga	3	0	1	0	2 (Note: Appearances in UEFA Europa League)	0	6	0
Partizan	Total		19	0	5	0	2	0	26	0
Čukarički	2016–17	Serbian SuperLiga	15	0	3	0	0	0	18	0
Čukarički	2017–18	Serbian SuperLiga	35	0	4	0	—		39	0
Čukarički	2018–19	Serbian SuperLiga	30	1	1	0	—		31	1
Čukarički	2019–20	Serbian SuperLiga	12	1	1	0	4	0	17	1
Čukarički	Total		92	2	9	0	4	0	105	2
Akhmat Grozny (loan)	2019–20	Russian Premier League	10	0	1	0	—		11	0
Akhmat Grozny	2020–21	Russian Premier League	29	0	3	0	—		32	0
Akhmat Grozny	2021–22	Russian Premier League	24	0	1	0	—		25	0
Akhmat Grozny	2022–23	Russian Premier League	25	0	4	0	—		29	0
Akhmat Grozny	2023–24	Russian Premier League	27	0	5	0	—		32	0
Akhmat Grozny	2024–25	Russian Premier League	10	0	4	0	—		14	0
Akhmat Grozny	2025–26	Russian Premier League	30	0	4	0	—		34	0
Akhmat Grozny	2026–27	Russian Premier League	12	0	5	0	—		17	0
Akhmat Grozny	Total		157	0	23	0	0	0	180	0
Akhmat Grozny	Club total		167	0	24	0	0	0	191	0
Career total			335	5	41	0	6	0	382	5

=== International ===
As of match played 20 March 2019

Appearances and goals by national team and year
National team	Year	Apps	Goals
Serbia	2019	1	0
Total		1	0

== Honours ==
Partizan

- Serbian Cup: 2015–16

Individual

- Serbian SuperLiga Team of the Season: 2017–18, 2018–19
