= Anton Shvets =

Russian footballer

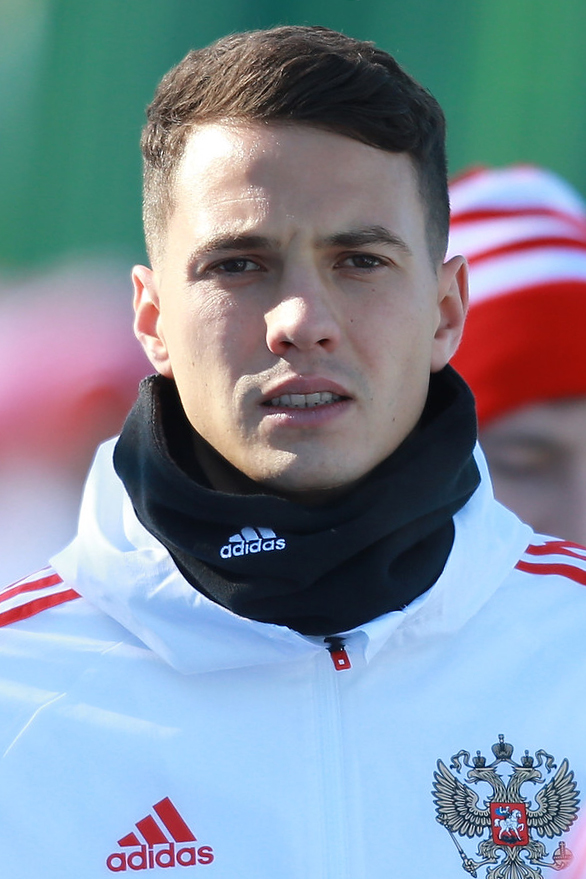
- Shvets with Russia national team in 2018

Personal information
- Full name: Anton Olegovich Shvets
- Date of birth: 26 April 1993 (age 33)
- Place of birth: Henichesk, Ukraine
- Height: 1.90 m (6 ft 3 in)
- Position: Midfielder

Youth career
- 1998–2003: Dinamo Tbilisi
- 2003–2006: CSKA Moscow
- 2006–2008: Spartak Moscow
- 2008–2010: Trudovye Rezervy Moscow
- 2010–2011: Spartak Moscow
- 2011–2012: Zaragoza

Senior career*
Years	Team	Apps	(Gls)
2012–2014	Zaragoza B	63	(5)
2014	Zaragoza	1	(0)
2014–2017	Villarreal B	71	(4)
2017–2025	Akhmat Grozny	162	(8)
2025–2026	Rubin Kazan	1	(0)

International career
2018	Russia	1	(0)
- * Club domestic league appearances and goals

Anton Olegovich Shvets (Russian: Антон Олегович Швец, Ukrainian: Антон Олегович Швець, Georgian: ანტონ ოლეგოვიჩ შვეცი; born 26 April 1993) is a former footballer who played as a defensive midfielder. Born in Ukraine, he has represented the Russian national team.

== Club career ==
Born in Ukraine to a Ukrainian father and a Georgian mother, Shvets moved to Georgia at early age, and later moved to Russia. In September 2010 he went on a trial at Real Zaragoza, but could not sign with the club due to his age; he later returned to Russia and joined FC Spartak Moscow's youth setup.

In the 2011 summer Shvets returned to Zaragoza, being assigned to the Juvenil squad. He made his senior debuts with Zaragoza's reserves in the 2011–12 campaign, appearing rarely in Segunda División B.

On 23 March 2014 Shvets played his first match as a professional, coming on as a late substitute in a 0–1 home loss against Deportivo de La Coruña in the Segunda División championship. On 19 June he moved to another reserve team, Villarreal CF B also in the third level.

On 1 July 2017, he signed a 4-year contract with the Russian Premier League club FC Akhmat Grozny. On 5 December 2022, Shvets extended his contract with Akhmat until the end of the 2025–26 season. Shvets left Akhmat by mutual consent on 24 July 2025, after eight seasons at the club.

On 16 September 2025, Shvets signed with Rubin Kazan. After playing in just two games, he first suffered an injury that kept him out of play for about a month, and shortly upon returning he suffered an ACL tear in training in late October. On 2 July 2026, he retired from playing.

== International career ==
In March 2013, Shvets was called up to Georgia under-21's, but refused to link up with the squad, committing himself to Russia. He played his first full international for his country on 27 March 2018 against France, replacing Alexandr Yerokhin, the game Russia lost with a score of 1–3.

On 11 May 2018, he was included in Russia's extended 2018 FIFA World Cup squad as a back-up, but was excluded from the final list.

== Career statistics ==
=== Club ===
As of match played 20 September 2025

Appearances and goals by club, season and competition
Club	Season	League			Cup		Other		Total	
Club	Season	Division	Apps	Goals	Apps	Goals	Apps	Goals	Apps	Goals
Zaragoza B	2011–12	Segunda División B	4	0	—		—		4	0
Zaragoza B	2012–13	Segunda División B	32	0	—		1 (Note: One appearance in Segunda División B relegation play-offs)	0	33	0
Zaragoza B	2013–14	Tercera División	27	5	—		2 (Note: Two appearances in Tercera División promotion play-offs)	0	29	5
Zaragoza B	Total		63	5	0	0	3	0	66	5
Zaragoza	2013–14	Segunda División	1	0	0	0	—		1	0
Villarreal B	2014–15	Segunda División B	30	1	—		—		30	1
Villarreal B	2015–16	Segunda División B	20	3	—		—		20	3
Villarreal B	2016–17	Segunda División B	21	0	—		—		21	0
Villarreal B	Total		71	4	0	0	0	0	71	4
Akhmat Grozny	2017–18	Russian Premier League	25	3	1	0	—		26	3
Akhmat Grozny	2018–19	Russian Premier League	20	2	0	0	—		20	2
Akhmat Grozny	2019–20	Russian Premier League	19	0	2	0	—		21	0
Akhmat Grozny	2020–21	Russian Premier League	21	1	5	2	—		26	3
Akhmat Grozny	2021–22	Russian Premier League	17	0	0	0	—		17	0
Akhmat Grozny	2022–23	Russian Premier League	27	2	6	0	—		33	2
Akhmat Grozny	2022–24	Russian Premier League	18	0	4	1	—		22	1
Akhmat Grozny	2024–25	Russian Premier League	15	0	7	1	—		22	1
Akhmat Grozny	Total		162	8	25	4	0	0	187	12
Rubin Kazan	2025–26	Russian Premier League	1	0	1	0	—		2	0
Career total			298	17	26	4	3	0	327	21
