= Islam Alsultanov =

Russian footballer

Personal information
- Full name: Islam Askhabovich Alsultanov
- Date of birth: 18 August 2001 (age 25)
- Place of birth: Ordzhonikidzevskaya, Russia
- Height: 1.85 m (6 ft 1 in)
- Position: Forward

Youth career
- –2021: Akhmat Grozny

Senior career*
| Years | Team | Apps | (Gls) |
| 2020–2024 | Akhmat Grozny | 12 | (0) |
| 2023 | → Volga Ulyanovsk (loan) | 17 | (1) |
| 2024–2025 | Fleetwood United | | |
- * Club domestic league appearances and goals as of 12 November 2023

Islam Askhabovich Alsultanov (Russian: Ислам Асхабович Альсултанов; born 18 August 2001) is a Russian football player who plays as a striker.

== Club career ==
He made his debut in the Russian Premier League for Akhmat Grozny on 18 October 2020 in a game against Rostov.

On 30 June 2023, Alsultanov joined Volga Ulyanovsk on loan.

On 20 January 2024, Alsultanov's contract with Akhmat was terminated by mutual consent.

== Career statistics ==
As of 28 November 2022

| Club | Season | League | | | Cup | | Continental | | Total | |
| Club | Season | Division | Apps | Goals | Apps | Goals | Apps | Goals | Apps | Goals |
|---|---|---|---|---|---|---|---|---|---|---|
| Akhmat Grozny | 2020–21 | RPL | 8 | 0 | 1 | 1 | – | | 9 | 1 |
| Akhmat Grozny | 2021–22 | RPL | 3 | 0 | 0 | 0 | – | | 3 | 0 |
| Akhmat Grozny | 2022–23 | RPL | 0 | 0 | 0 | 0 | – | | 0 | 0 |
| Career total | | | 11 | 0 | 1 | 1 | 0 | 0 | 12 | 1 |
