= Artem Polyarus =

Ukrainian footballer

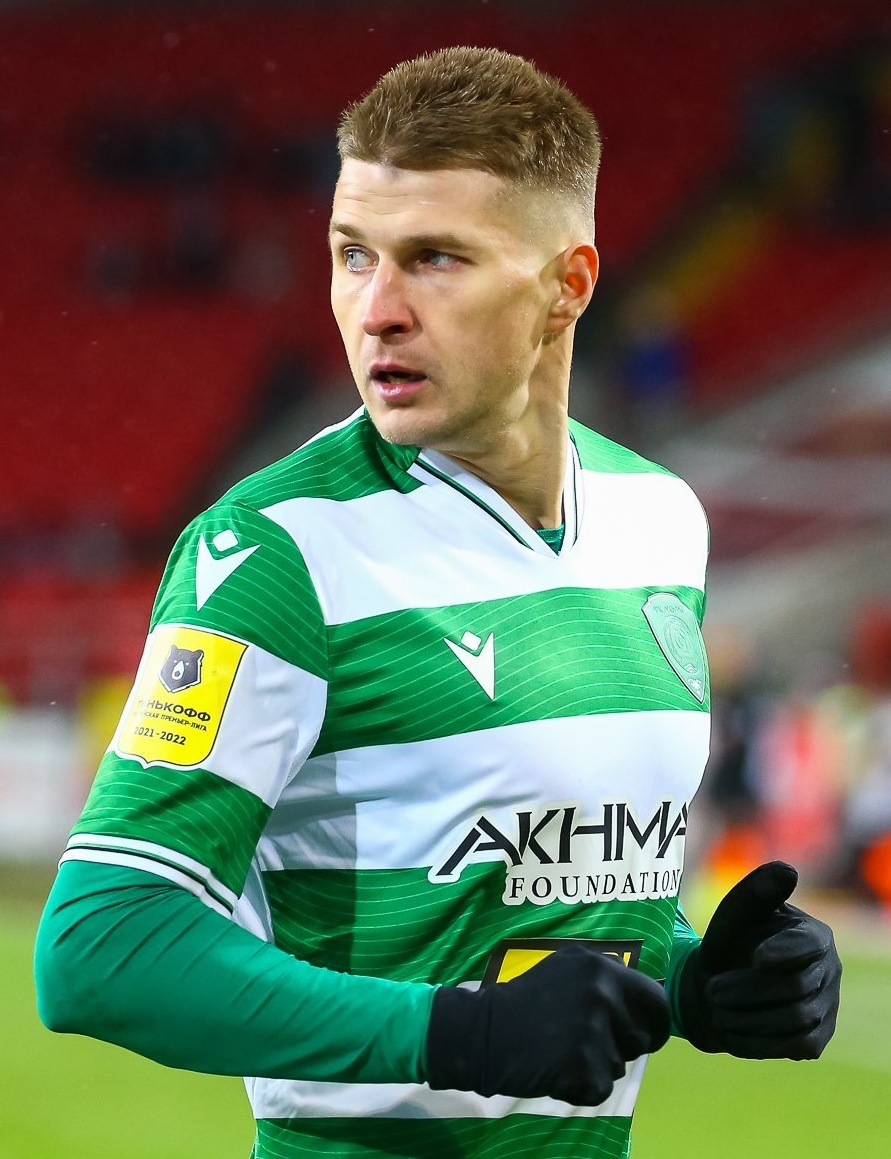
- Polyarus with Akhmat Grozny in 2021

Personal information
- Full name: Artem Ihorovych Polyarus
- Date of birth: 5 July 1992 (age 34)
- Place of birth: Oleksandriya, Ukraine
- Height: 1.79 m (5 ft 10 in)
- Position: Left midfielder

Team information
- Current team: Urartu
- Number: 14

Youth career
- 2005–2009: Ametyst Oleksandriya

Senior career*
Years	Team	Apps	(Gls)
2009–2010	Ametyst Oleksandriya (amateurs)	21	(10)
2011–2014	Oleksandriya	35	(3)
2014–2015	Dynamo-2 Kyiv	27	(3)
2015–2019	Oleksandriya	79	(9)
2019–2020	Khimki	34	(5)
2020–2022	Akhmat Grozny	23	(3)
2022–2024	Bruk-Bet Termalica	39	(5)
2024	Zagłębie Sosnowiec	14	(0)
2024–	Urartu	38	(4)

International career
2012	Ukraine U20	2	(0)
2012–2013	Ukraine U21	7	(1)
- * Club domestic league appearances and goals as of 18 June 2026

Artem Ihorovych Polyarus (Ukrainian: Артем Ігорович Полярус; born 5 July 1992) is a Ukrainian professional footballer who plays as a left midfielder for Urartu.

== Club career ==
He is the product of Ametyst Oleksandria's sportive school and his first trainer was Ihor Kostyra.

While playing for his home team Oleksandriya during the 2017–18 season, in November 2017 Polyarus was recognized as a player of the month in the Ukrainian Premier League.

On 20 June 2019, he signed with the Russian Football National League club Khimki.

On 1 October 2020, he signed a three-year contract with Akhmat Grozny. He left Akhmat by mutual consent on 3 March 2022.

On 15 March 2022, Polyarus signed with Bruk-Bet Termalica in Poland. He amicably terminated his contract with the club on 16 February 2024.

On the same day, Polyarus joined fellow I liga side Zagłębie Sosnowiec until the end of the season. On 12 June 2024, with less than three weeks left on his contract, it was terminated by mutual consent.

On 18 June 2024, Armenian Premier League club Urartu announced the signing of Polyarus.

== Career statistics ==
As of 28 May 2024

Club	Season	League			Cup		Continental		Other		Total	
Club	Season	Division	Apps	Goals	Apps	Goals	Apps	Goals	Apps	Goals	Apps	Goals
Oleksandriya	2010–11	Ukrainian First League	2	0	0	0	—		—		2	0
Oleksandriya	2011–12	Ukrainian Premier League	3	0	0	0	—		—		3	0
Oleksandriya	2012–13	Ukrainian First League	24	3	1	1	—		—		25	4
Oleksandriya	2013–14	Ukrainian First League	6	0	1	0	—		—		7	0
Oleksandriya	Total		35	3	2	1	—		—		37	4
Dynamo-2 Kyiv	2014–15	Ukrainian First League	27	3	—		—		—		27	3
Oleksandriya	2015–16	Ukrainian Premier League	12	2	4	1	—		—		16	3
Oleksandriya	2016–17	Ukrainian Premier League	20	2	0	0	0	0	—		20	2
Oleksandriya	2017–18	Ukrainian Premier League	25	4	1	0	2 (Note: Appearances in UEFA Europa League)	0	—		28	4
Oleksandriya	2018–19	Ukrainian Premier League	22	1	0	0	—		—		22	1
Oleksandriya	Total		79	9	5	1	2	0	—		86	10
Khimki	2019–20	Russian First League	26	5	5	4	—		5 (Note: Appearances in FNL Cup)	3	36	12
Khimki	2020–21	Russian Premier League	8	0	0	0	—		—		8	0
Khimki	Total		34	5	5	4	—		5	3	44	12
Akhmat Grozny	2020–21	Russian Premier League	12	1	1	0	—		—		13	1
Akhmat Grozny	2021–22	Russian Premier League	11	2	2	0	—		—		13	2
Akhmat Grozny	Total		23	3	3	0	—		—		26	3
Bruk-Bet Termalica	2021–22	Ekstraklasa	3	0	—		—		—		3	0
Bruk-Bet Termalica	2022–23	I liga	24	2	1	0	—		—		25	2
Bruk-Bet Termalica	2023–24	I liga	12	3	1	0	—		—		13	3
Bruk-Bet Termalica	Total		39	5	2	0	—		—		41	5
Zagłębie Sosnowiec	2023–24	I liga	14	0	—		—		—		14	0
Career total			251	28	17	6	2	0	5	3	275	37

== Honours ==
Oleksandriya

- Ukrainian First League: 2010–11

Individual

- Ukrainian Premier League Player of the Month: 2017–18 (November)
