= Aleksandr Putsko =

Russian footballer

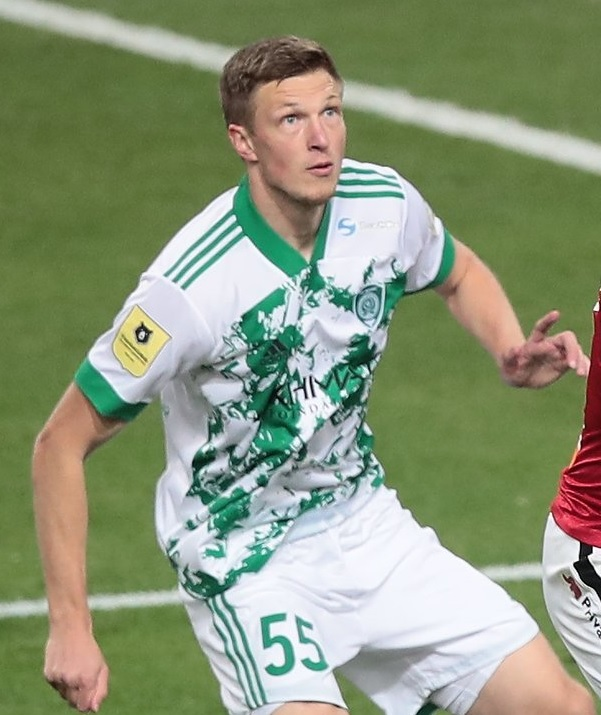
- Putsko with Akhmat Grozny in 2020

Personal information
- Full name: Aleksandr Aleksandrovich Putsko
- Date of birth: 24 February 1993 (age 33)
- Place of birth: Unecha, Russia
- Height: 1.90 m (6 ft 3 in)
- Position: Centre-back

Team information
- Current team: KDV Tomsk
- Number: 5

Youth career
- –2007: Dynamo Bryansk
- 2007–2013: Spartak Moscow

Senior career*
Years	Team	Apps	(Gls)
2012–2016	Spartak Moscow	3	(0)
2013–2016	→ Spartak-2 Moscow	94	(5)
2017–2020	Ufa	42	(0)
2017–2018	→ SKA-Khabarovsk (loan)	20	(0)
2020–2022	Akhmat Grozny	23	(0)
2022–2024	Baltika Kaliningrad	25	(0)
2024–2025	Urartu	28	(3)
2025–2026	Arsenal Tula	18	(1)
2026–	KDV Tomsk	15	(1)

International career
2009	Russia U-17	6	(0)
2010–2011	Russia U-18	8	(2)
2012	Russia U-19	4	(0)
2013	Russia U-20	2	(0)
- * Club domestic league appearances and goals as of 1 November 2026

Aleksandr Aleksandrovich Putsko (Russian: Александр Александрович Пуцко; born 24 February 1993) is a Russian professional football player who plays as a centre-back for KDV Tomsk.

== Career ==
=== Club ===
Putsko played for FC Spartak Moscow in the 2012–13 Russian Cup game against FC Salyut Belgorod on 26 September 2012.

Putsko made his Russian Premier League debut for FC Spartak Moscow on 23 April 2016 in a game against FC Mordovia Saransk.

On 6 August 2020, Akhmat Grozny announced the signing of Putsko to a two-year contract from Ufa.

On 12 January 2024, Putsko's contract with Baltika Kaliningrad was terminated by mutual consent. The following week, he joined reigning Armenian Premier League champions Urartu. Putsko was coached 10 years earlier at Spartak youth teams by Urartu's manager Dmitri Gunko.

On 3 July 2025, he moved to Arsenal Tula.

== Career statistics ==
=== Club ===
As of match played 21 May 2022

Club	Season	League			Cup		Continental		Other		Total	
Club	Season	Division	Apps	Goals	Apps	Goals	Apps	Goals	Apps	Goals	Apps	Goals
Spartak Moscow	2010	Russian Premier League	0	0	0	0	0	0	–		0	0
Spartak Moscow	2011–12	Russian Premier League	0	0	0	0	0	0	–		0	0
Spartak Moscow	2012–13	Russian Premier League	0	0	1	0	0	0	–		1	0
Spartak Moscow	2013–14	Russian Premier League	0	0	0	0	0	0	–		0	0
Spartak Moscow	2014–15	Russian Premier League	0	0	0	0	–		–		0	0
Spartak Moscow	2015–16	Russian Premier League	2	0	0	0	–		–		2	0
Spartak Moscow	2016–17	Russian Premier League	1	0	0	0	0	0	–		1	0
Spartak Moscow	Total		3	0	1	0	0	0	0	0	4	0
Spartak-2 Moscow	2013–14	PFL	25	2	–		–		–		25	2
Spartak-2 Moscow	2014–15	PFL	29	2	–		–		–		29	2
Spartak-2 Moscow	2015–16	FNL	30	1	–		–		–		30	1
Spartak-2 Moscow	2016–17	FNL	10	0	–		–		1 (Note: Appearance in the FNL Cup)	0	11	0
Spartak-2 Moscow	Total		94	5	0	0	0	0	1	0	95	5
Ufa	2016–17	Russian Premier League	5	0	2	0	–		–		7	0
Ufa	2017–18	Russian Premier League	0	0	0	0	–		–		0	0
Ufa	2018–19	Russian Premier League	17	0	0	0	0	0	0	0	17	0
Ufa	2019–20	Russian Premier League	20	0	1	0	–		–		21	0
Ufa	Total		42	0	3	0	0	0	0	0	45	0
SKA-Khabarovsk (loan)	2017–18	Russian Premier League	20	0	2	0	–		–		22	0
Akhmat Grozny	2020–21	Russian Premier League	17	0	4	0	–		–		21	0
Akhmat Grozny	2021–22	Russian Premier League	6	0	2	0	–		–		8	0
Akhmat Grozny	Total		23	0	6	0	0	0	0	0	29	0
Career total			182	5	12	0	0	0	1	0	195	5
