= Artyom Timofeyev (footballer) =

Russian footballer (born 1994)

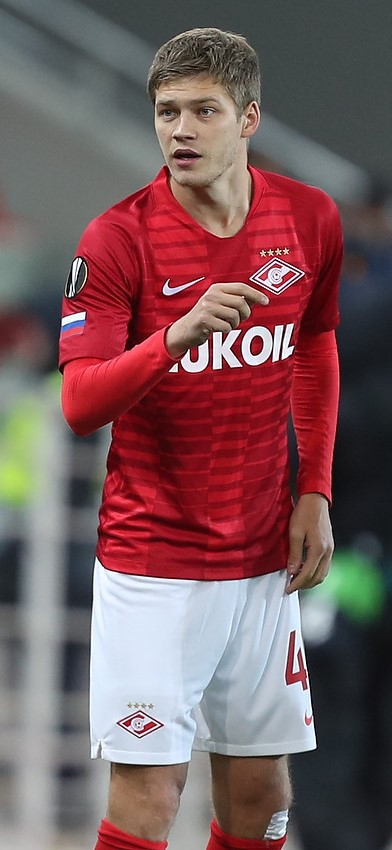
- Timofeyev with Spartak in 2018

Personal information
- Full name: Artyom Andreyevich Timofeyev
- Date of birth: 12 January 1994 (age 32)
- Place of birth: Saratov, Russia
- Height: 1.85 m (6 ft 1 in)
- Position: Midfielder

Team information
- Current team: Nizhny Novgorod
- Number: 94

Youth career
- 2000–2006: Sokol Saratov
- 2006–2009: Spartak Moscow
- 2010–2012: Chertanovo Education Center
- 2012–2015: Spartak Moscow

Senior career*
Years	Team	Apps	(Gls)
2013–2021	Spartak Moscow	23	(1)
2013–2018	Spartak-2 Moscow	57	(3)
2019–2020	→ Krylia Sovetov (loan)	31	(1)
2020–2021	→ Akhmat Grozny (loan)	26	(3)
2021–2024	Akhmat Grozny	79	(12)
2024–2026	Lokomotiv Moscow	14	(1)
2026–	Nizhny Novgorod	0	(0)

International career^{‡}
2011	Russia U-18	2	(0)
2013	Russia U-19	2	(0)
2014–2015	Russia U-21	4	(0)
- * Club domestic league appearances and goals as of 16 June 2026 ‡ National team caps and goals as of 14 June 2015

Artyom Andreyevich Timofeyev (Russian: Артём Андреевич Тимофеев; born 12 January 1994) is a Russian football player who plays as a defensive midfielder for Nizhny Novgorod.

== Club career ==
Timofeyev made his debut in the Russian Professional Football League for FC Spartak-2 Moscow on 30 July 2013 in a game against FC Vityaz Podolsk.

Timofeyev made his first-team debut for FC Spartak Moscow on 22 August 2013 as a starter in the Europa League qualifying game against FC St. Gallen.

Timofeyev made his Russian Premier League debut for FC Spartak Moscow on 15 March 2015 in a game against FC Dynamo Moscow. He scored his first league goal for Spartak on 7 October 2018, an added-time winner in a 3–2 defeat of FC Yenisey Krasnoyarsk.

On 13 January 2019, Timofeyev joined Krylia Sovetov Samara on loan until the end of the 2018–19 season. On 27 June 2019, Timofeyev rejoined Krylia Sovetov on another season-long loan.

On 6 August 2020, Timofeyev joined Akhmat Grozny on a season-long loan deal for the 2020–21 season.

On 31 July 2021, he returned to Akhmat on a permanent basis and signed a 3-year contract.

On 4 July 2024, Timofeyev joined Lokomotiv Moscow on a one-year contract with a second-year option. On 16 June 2026, he left Lokomotiv by mutual consent.

On 18 June 2026, Timofeyev signed a two-season contract with Nizhny Novgorod.

== Career statistics ==
=== Club ===
As of match played 7 December 2025

Club	Season	League			Cup		Europe		Other		Total	
Club	Season	Division	Apps	Goals	Apps	Goals	Apps	Goals	Apps	Goals	Apps	Goals
Spartak-2 Moscow	2013–14	Russian Second League	11	0	—		—		—		11	0
Spartak-2 Moscow	2014–15	Russian Second League	5	1	—		—		—		5	1
Spartak-2 Moscow	2015–16	Russian First League	27	0	—		—		1 (Note: Appearance in the FNL Cup)	0	28	0
Spartak-2 Moscow	2016–17	Russian First League	13	2	—		—		—		13	2
Spartak-2 Moscow	2017–18	Russian First League	1	0	—		—		—		1	0
Spartak-2 Moscow	Total		57	3	0	0	0	0	1	0	58	3
Spartak Moscow	2013–14	Russian Premier League	0	0	0	0	1 (Note: Appearance in the UEFA Europa League)	0	—		1	0
Spartak Moscow	2014–15	Russian Premier League	3	0	0	0	—		—		3	0
Spartak Moscow	2015–16	Russian Premier League	0	0	0	0	—		—		0	0
Spartak Moscow	2016–17	Russian Premier League	5	0	0	0	0	0	—		5	0
Spartak Moscow	2017–18	Russian Premier League	8	0	0	0	0	0	—		8	0
Spartak Moscow	2018–19	Russian Premier League	7	1	3	0	5 (Note: One appearance in the UEFA Champions League, four appearances in the UEFA Europa League)	0	—		15	1
Spartak Moscow	Total		23	1	3	0	6	0	0	0	32	1
Krylia Sovetov Samara (loan)	2018–19	Russian Premier League	10	1	—		—		2 (Note: Appearances in the relegation play-offs)	0	12	1
Krylia Sovetov Samara (loan)	2019–20	Russian Premier League	21	0	1	0	—		—		22	0
Krylia Sovetov Samara (loan)	Total		31	1	1	0	0	0	2	0	34	1
Akhmat Grozny (loan)	2020–21	Russian Premier League	26	3	4	0	—		—		30	3
Akhmat Grozny	2021–22	Russian Premier League	27	2	0	0	—		—		27	2
Akhmat Grozny	2022–23	Russian Premier League	26	8	5	0	—		—		31	8
Akhmat Grozny	2023–24	Russian Premier League	26	2	4	0	—		—		30	2
Akhmat Grozny	Total		79	12	9	0	—		—		88	12
Lokomotiv Moscow	2024–25	Russian Premier League	13	1	7	0	—		—		20	1
Lokomotiv Moscow	2025–26	Russian Premier League	1	0	4	0	—		—		5	0
Lokomotiv Moscow	Total		14	1	11	0	—		—		25	1
Career total			230	21	28	0	6	0	3	0	267	21
