= Amir Aduyev =

Russian footballer (born 1999)

Personal information
- Full name: Amir Adamovich Aduyev
- Date of birth: 11 May 1999 (age 27)
- Place of birth: Ordzhonikidzevskaya, Russia
- Height: 1.81 m (5 ft 11 in)
- Position: Central midfielder

Team information
- Current team: Onet-le-Château

Youth career
- 2005: Avignon F84
- 2005–2012: Onet-le-Château
- 2012–2019: Montpellier

Senior career*
Years	Team	Apps	(Gls)
2016–2020	Montpellier II	66	(21)
2019–2020	Montpellier	0	(0)
2020–2023	Akhmat Grozny	8	(0)
2022	→ Shakhter Karagandy (loan)	9	(0)
2024–	Onet-le-Château	10	(0)

International career^{‡}
2019	Russia U21	2	(0)
- * Club domestic league appearances and goals as of 18 May 2024 ‡ National team caps and goals as of 25 March 2019

Amir Adamovich Aduyev (Russian: Амир Адамович Адуев; born 11 May 1999) is a Russian football player who plays as a central midfielder for French Championnat National 3 club Onet-le-Château.

== Early life ==
He was born in Ingushetia, his family immigrated to France when he was 3 years old. He holds both French and Russian nationalities.

== Club career ==
He is a product of Montpellier youth teams. In 2018–19 UEFA Youth League he scored 3 goals and provided 3 assists in 6 games for the club's Under-19 squad.

He was called up to the senior squad of Montpellier on several occasions in 2019, but remained on the bench.

On 1 October 2020, he signed a four-year contract with Russian Premier League club FC Akhmat Grozny.

He made his debut for the main squad of Akhmat on 21 October 2020 in a Russian Cup game against FC Shinnik Yaroslavl. He made his Russian Premier League debut for Akhmat on 28 November 2020 in a game against FC Lokomotiv Moscow.

On 24 February 2022, Aduyev joined Shakhter Karagandy on loan for the 2022 season.

== International career ==
He has been called up to France U-18 squad, but did not play in any games. In early 2019, he was called up to Russia national under-21 football team and played in two friendlies.

== Career statistics ==
As of match played 8 May 2022

Club	Season	League			Cup		Continental		Total	
Club	Season	Division	Apps	Goals	Apps	Goals	Apps	Goals	Apps	Goals
Montpellier II	2016–17	National 2	13	0	–		–		13	0
Montpellier II	2017–18	National 3	15	6	–		–		15	6
Montpellier II	2018–19	National 3	23	8	–		–		23	8
Montpellier II	2019–20	National 2	14	7	–		–		14	7
Montpellier II	2020–21	National 3	1	0	–		–		1	0
Montpellier II	Total		66	21	0	0	0	0	66	21
Montpellier	2018–19	Ligue 1	0	0	0	0	–		9	0
Montpellier	2019–20	Ligue 1	0	0	0	0	–		0	0
Montpellier	Total		0	0	0	0	0	0	0	0
Akhmat Grozny	2020–21	RPL	8	0	2	0	–		10	0
Akhmat Grozny	2021–22	RPL	0	0	2	1	–		2	1
Akhmat Grozny	Total		8	0	4	1	0	0	12	1
Shakhter Karagandy (loan)	2022	KPL	9	0	0	0	–		9	0
Career total			83	21	4	1	0	0	87	22
