= Abubakar Kadyrov =

Russian footballer

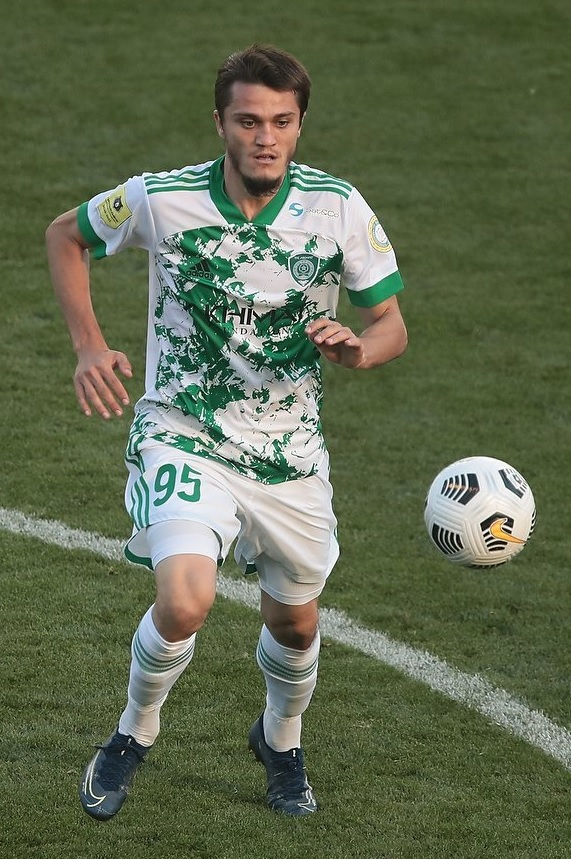
- Kadyrov with FC Akhmat Grozny in 2020

Personal information
- Full name: Abubakar Khamidovich Kadyrov
- Date of birth: 26 August 1996 (age 30)
- Place of birth: Oyskhara, Russia
- Height: 1.85 m (6 ft 1 in)
- Position: Forward

Youth career
- 2012–2018: Akhmat Grozny

Senior career*
Years	Team	Apps	(Gls)
2012–2022	Akhmat Grozny	1	(0)
- * Club domestic league appearances and goals

Abubakar Khamidovich Kadyrov (Russian: Абубакар Хамидович Кадыров; born August 26, 1996) is a former Russian footballer who played as a striker.

== Career ==
Kadyrov made his professional debut for FC Akhmat Grozny on August 22, 2020, in the Russian Premier League against FC Khimki. He retired on October 27, 2022.

== Career statistics ==
=== Club ===
As of match played 19 October 2022

Club	Season	League			Cup		Continental		Total	
Club	Season	Division	Apps	Goals	Apps	Goals	Apps	Goals	Apps	Goals
Akhmat Grozny	2012–13	Russian Premier League	0	0	0	0	–		0	0
Akhmat Grozny	2013–14	Russian Premier League	0	0	0	0	–		0	0
Akhmat Grozny	2014–15	Russian Premier League	0	0	0	0	–		0	0
Akhmat Grozny	2015–16	Russian Premier League	0	0	0	0	–		0	0
Akhmat Grozny	2016–17	Russian Premier League	0	0	0	0	–		0	0
Akhmat Grozny	2017–18	Russian Premier League	0	0	0	0	–		0	0
Akhmat Grozny	2018–19	Russian Premier League	0	0	0	0	–		0	0
Akhmat Grozny	2019–20	Russian Premier League	0	0	0	0	–		0	0
Akhmat Grozny	2020–21	Russian Premier League	1	0	1	0	–		2	0
Akhmat Grozny	2021–22	Russian Premier League	0	0	2	1	–		2	1
Akhmat Grozny	2022–23	Russian Premier League	0	0	1	0	–		1	0
Akhmat Grozny	Total		1	0	4	1	0	0	5	1
Total			1	0	4	1	0	0	5	1

== Personal life ==
Kadyrov is a 1st grade cousin of Chechen politician Ramzan Kadyrov, being son of Magomed Abdulkhamidovich Kadyrov (formally known as Khamid, born in 1961).
