= Lechi Sadulayev =

Russian footballer

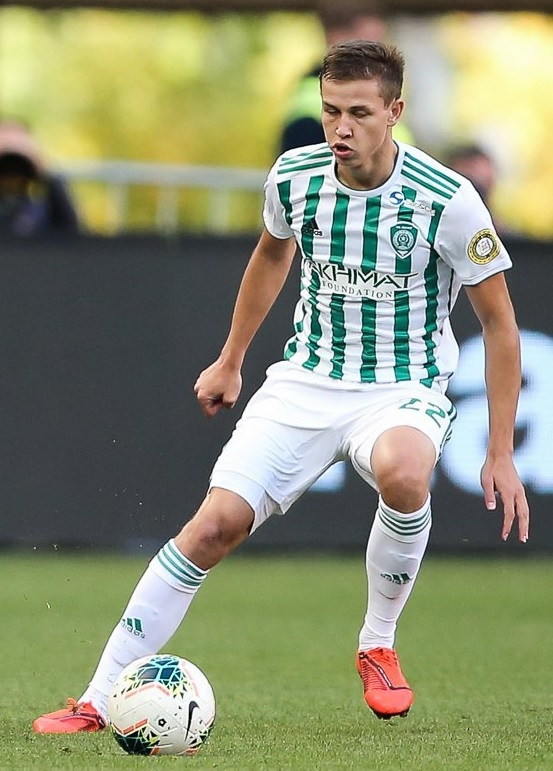
- Sadulayev with Akhmat Grozny in 2019

Personal information
- Full name: Lechi Baymarzayevich Sadulayev
- Date of birth: 8 January 2000 (age 26)
- Place of birth: Tsentaroy, Russia
- Height: 1.79 m (5 ft 10 in)
- Position: Midfielder

Team information
- Current team: Akhmat Grozny
- Number: 7

Youth career
- 2010–2018: Akhmat Grozny

Senior career*
Years	Team	Apps	(Gls)
2018–	Akhmat Grozny	146	(14)

International career^{‡}
2019	Russia U-20	9	(1)
2022–	Russia	20	(6)
- * Club domestic league appearances and goals as of 21 November 2026 ‡ National team caps and goals as of 17 November 2026

Lechi Baymarzayevich Sadulayev (Russian: Лечи Баймарзаевич Садулаев; born 8 January 2000) is a Russian football player who plays for Akhmat Grozny in the Russian Premier League and the Russia national team. He is deployed in a variety of positions, mostly as an attacking midfielder, but also as a wide midfielder or winger on right or left side of the field.

== Club career ==
He made his debut in the Russian Premier League for Akhmat Grozny on 10 December 2018 in a game against Arsenal Tula as a 90th-minute substitute for Magomed Mitrishev.

== International career ==
Sadulayev was called up to the Russia national football team for the first time in November 2022 for friendly games against Tajikistan and Uzbekistan. He made his debut against Tajikistan on 17 November 2022.

== Personal life ==
Sadulayev is an ethnic Chechen.

He changed his shirt number for the first six seasons he played professionally, he made his debut under number 87 and then changed it to 22, 99, 17, 11 and 10 in the 2023–24 season. He kept number 10 in the 2024–25 season, before changing it again to 7 for the 2025–26 season.

== Career statistics ==
=== Club ===
As of match played 21 November 2026

Appearances and goals by club, season and competition
Club	Season	League			Cup		Other		Total	
Club	Season	Division	Apps	Goals	Apps	Goals	Apps	Goals	Apps	Goals
Akhmat Grozny	2018–19	Russian Premier League	2	0	0	0	—		2	0
Akhmat Grozny	2019–20	Russian Premier League	6	0	0	0	—		6	0
Akhmat Grozny	2020–21	Russian Premier League	18	1	2	0	—		20	1
Akhmat Grozny	2021–22	Russian Premier League	16	1	2	0	—		18	1
Akhmat Grozny	2022–23	Russian Premier League	22	2	6	3	—		28	5
Akhmat Grozny	2023–24	Russian Premier League	14	2	1	0	—		15	2
Akhmat Grozny	2024–25	Russian Premier League	28	3	5	0	2 (Note: Appearances in relegation play-offs)	0	35	3
Akhmat Grozny	2025–26	Russian Premier League	28	1	5	1	—		33	2
Akhmat Grozny	2026–27	Russian Premier League	12	4	5	0	—		17	4
Career total			146	14	26	4	2	0	174	18

=== International ===
As of match played 17 November 2026

Appearances and goals by national team and year
National team	Year	Apps	Goals
Russia	2022	1	0
Russia	2024	3	1
Russia	2025	7	1
Russia	2026	9	4
Total		20	6

=== International goals ===
No.	Date	Venue	Opponent	Score	Result	Competition
1.	15 November 2024	Krasnodar Stadium, Krasnodar, Russia	Brunei	5–0	11–0	Friendly
2.	14 October 2025	VTB Arena, Moscow, Russia	Bolivia	1–0	3–0	Friendly
3.	27 March 2026	Krasnodar Stadium, Krasnodar, Russia	Nicaragua	1–0	3–1	Friendly
4.	5 June 2026	Volgograd Arena, Volgograd, Russia	Burkina Faso	1–0	3–0	Friendly
5.	3 October 2026	Yekaterinburg Arena, Yekaterinburg, Russia	Namibia	1–0	6–0	Friendly
6.	6 October 2026	Nizhny Novgorod Stadium, Nizhny Novgorod, Russia	Nigeria	1–1	3–3	Friendly

== Honours ==
Individual

- Russian Premier League goal of the month: October 2026 (against Zenit, 18 October).
