= Ilya Moseychuk =

Russian footballer

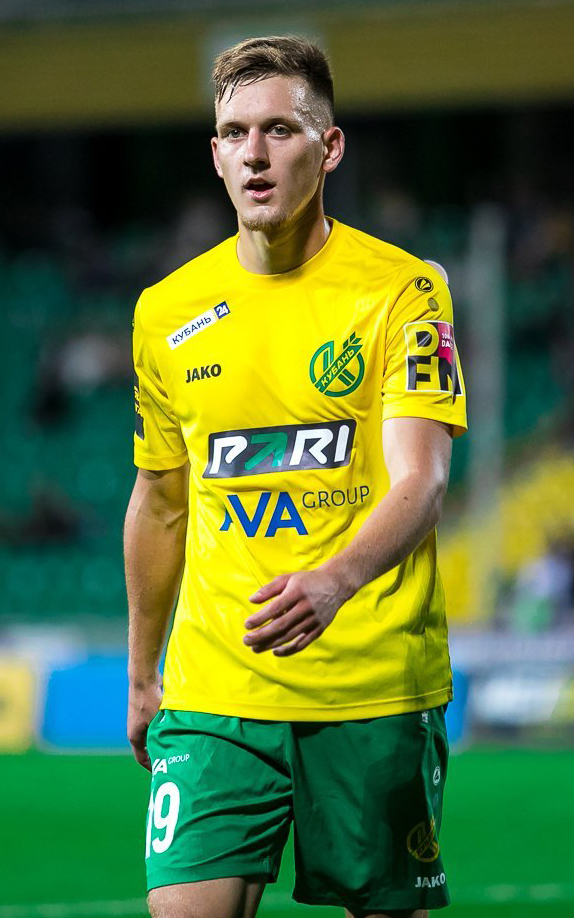
- Moseychuk with Kuban Krasnodar in 2022

Personal information
- Full name: Ilya Antonovich Moseychuk
- Date of birth: 19 March 2000 (age 26)
- Place of birth: Omsukchan, Russia
- Height: 1.80 m (5 ft 11 in)
- Position: Midfielder

Team information
- Current team: KAMAZ Naberezhnye Chelny
- Number: 9

Youth career
- –2017: Energomash Shebekino
- 2017–2020: Akhmat Grozny

Senior career*
Years	Team	Apps	(Gls)
2020–2025	Akhmat Grozny	0	(0)
2020–2022	→ Tekstilshchik Ivanovo (loan)	68	(3)
2022–2025	→ Kuban Krasnodar (loan)	82	(10)
2025–2026	Kuban Krasnodar	29	(3)
2026–	KAMAZ Naberezhnye Chelny	0	(0)
- * Club domestic league appearances and goals as of 14 June 2026

Ilya Antonovich Moseychuk (Russian: Илья Антонович Мосейчук; born 19 March 2000) is a Russian football player who plays for KAMAZ Naberezhnye Chelny.

== Club career ==
He made his debut in the Russian Football National League for Tekstilshchik Ivanovo on 8 August 2020 in a game against SKA-Khabarovsk, he substituted Aleksandr Shlyonkin in the 86th minute.

On 13 July 2022, Moseychuk joined Kuban Krasnodar on a season-long loan. The loan was renewed for the 2023–24 season.
