= Nikita Karmayev =

Russian footballer

Personal information
- Full name: Nikita Aleksandrovich Karmayev
- Date of birth: 17 July 2000 (age 26)
- Place of birth: Slavyansk-na-Kubani, Russia
- Height: 1.89 m (6 ft 2 in)
- Position: Centre-back

Team information
- Current team: FC Arsenal Tula/ FC Arsenal-2 Tula
- Number: 45

Youth career
- –2016: FC Krasnodar
- 2017–2018: FC Afips Afipsky
- 2018–2020: FC Akhmat Grozny

Senior career*
Years	Team	Apps	(Gls)
2018–2023	FC Akhmat Grozny	5	(0)
2021–2022	→ FC Kuban Krasnodar (loan)	15	(1)
2022–2023	→ FC Rotor Volgograd (loan)	23	(2)
2023–2025	FC Chayka Peschanokopskoye	60	(1)
2025–	FC Arsenal Tula	22	(0)
2025–	FC Arsenal-2 Tula	3	(0)

International career^{‡}
2021	Russia U21	2	(0)
- * Club domestic league appearances and goals as of 31 October 2026 ‡ National team caps and goals as of 6 June 2021

Nikita Aleksandrovich Karmayev (Russian: Никита Александрович Кармаев; born 17 July 2000) is a Russian football player who plays for FC Arsenal Tula and FC Arsenal-2 Tula.

== Club career ==
He made his debut in the Russian Premier League for FC Akhmat Grozny on 27 September 2020 in a game against FC Ural Yekaterinburg.
