= Alvi Adilkhanov =

Russian footballer

Personal information
- Full name: Alvi Musayevich Adilkhanov
- Date of birth: 9 March 2003 (age 23)
- Place of birth: Gudermes, Russia
- Height: 1.78 m (5 ft 10 in)
- Position: Midfielder

Youth career
- 2020–2023: Akhmat Grozny

Senior career*
Years	Team	Apps	(Gls)
2021–2023	Akhmat Grozny	1	(0)
- * Club domestic league appearances and goals as of 29 July 2023

Alvi Musayevich Adilkhanov (Russian: Альви Мусаевич Адилханов; born 9 March 2003) is a Russian football player who plays as a central midfielder.

== Club career ==
He made his debut in the Russian Premier League for FC Akhmat Grozny on 24 April 2021 in a game against FC Ural Yekaterinburg.
