= 2016–17 FC Terek Grozny season =

FC Terek Grozny
2016–17 season
- Chairman: Ramzan Kadyrov
- Manager: Rashid Rakhimov
- Stadium: Akhmat-Arena
- Russian Premier League: 5th
- Russian Cup: Round of 16 vs Ufa
- Top goalscorer: League: Bekim Balaj (9); All: Bekim Balaj (9)
Home colours	Away colours

The 2016–17 FC Terek Grozny season was the eighth successive season that the club was play in the Russian Premier League, the highest tier of association football in Russia, and 7th in total. Terek Grozny finished the season in 5th position, narrowly missing out on the Europa League, whilst they were knocked out of the Russian Cup at the Round of 16 stage by Ufa.

== Squad ==
As of match played 21 May 2017

No.	Name	Nationality	Position	Date of birth (age)	Signed from	Signed in	Contract ends	Apps.	Goals
Goalkeepers
1	Yaroslav Hodzyur	(Ukraine)	GK	6 March 1985 (aged 32)	Dynamo-2 Kyiv	2008		103	0
16	Yevgeni Gorodov	(Russia)	GK	13 December 1985 (aged 31)	Krasnodar	2013		70	0
33	Vitali Gudiyev	(Russia)	GK	22 April 1995 (aged 22)	Alania Vladikavkaz	2014		1	0
35	Ibragim-Sayfullakh Gaziyev	(Russia)	GK	13 November 1996 (aged 20)	Trainee	2015		1	0
97	Khamzat Nasurov	(Russia)	GK	24 July 1999 (aged 17)	Trainee	2016		0	0
Defenders
2	Rodolfo	(Brazil)	DF	23 October 1982 (aged 34)	Vasco da Gama	2015		51	1
3	Norbert Gyömbér	(Slovakia)	DF	3 July 1992 (aged 24)	loan from Roma	2017	2017	7	0
4	Wilker Ángel	(Venezuela)	DF	18 March 1993 (aged 24)	Deportivo Táchira	2016		28	1
5	Zaurbek Pliyev	(Russia)	DF	27 September 1991 (aged 25)	Kairat	2016		22	0
13	Milad Mohammadi	(Iran)	DF	29 September 1993 (aged 23)	Rah Ahan	2016		28	2
15	Andrei Semyonov	(Russia)	DF	24 March 1989 (aged 28)	Amkar Perm	2013		105	2
25	Khalid Shakhtiyev	(Russia)	DF	15 May 1997 (aged 20)	Trainee	2014		0	0
40	Rizvan Utsiyev	(Russia)	DF	7 February 1988 (aged 29)	Trainee	2005			
Midfielders
10	Gheorghe Grozav	(Romania)	MF	10 September 1992 (aged 24)	Petrolul Ploiești	2013		54	8
14	Daler Kuzyayev	(Russia)	MF	15 January 1993 (aged 24)	Neftekhimik Nizhnekamsk	2014		73	0
19	Oleg Ivanov	(Russia)	MF	4 August 1986 (aged 30)	Rostov	2012		159	10
20	Gabriel Torje	(Romania)	MF	22 November 1989 (aged 27)	Udinese	2016		11	0
21	Odise Roshi	(Albania)	MF	22 May 1991 (aged 25)	Rijeka	2016		20	1
22	Reziuan Mirzov	(Russia)	MF	22 June 1993 (aged 23)	Torpedo Moscow	2015		14	0
23	Facundo Píriz	(Uruguay)	MF	27 March 1990 (aged 27)	Nacional	2013	2017	75	3
27	Magomed Ozdoyev	(Russia)	MF	5 November 1992 (aged 24)	loan from Rubin Kazan	2017	2017	6	0
55	Igor Lebedenko	(Russia)	MF	27 May 1983 (aged 33)	Rubin Kazan	2012		147	21
77	Bernard Berisha	(Kosovo)	MF	24 October 1991 (aged 25)	Anzhi Makhachkala	2017		8	1
Forwards
7	Khalid Kadyrov	(Russia)	FW	19 April 1994 (aged 23)	Trainee	2010		12	1
9	Zaur Sadayev	(Russia)	FW	6 November 1989 (aged 27)	Trainee	2006			
11	Abubakar Kadyrov	(Russia)	FW	26 August 1996 (aged 20)	Trainee	2012		0	0
17	Ablaye Mbengue	(Senegal)	FW	19 May 1992 (aged 25)	Sapins	2015		50	14
18	Bekim Balaj	(Albania)	FW	11 January 1991 (aged 26)	HNK Rijeka	2016		27	9
95	Magomed Mitrishev	(Russia)	FW	10 September 1992 (aged 24)	Spartak Nalchik	2012		68	11
Left During the Season
3	Sergei Bryzgalov	(Russia)	MF	15 November 1992 (aged 24)	Spartak Moscow	2016		4	0
6	Adílson	(Brazil)	MF	16 January 1987 (aged 30)	Grêmio	2011		107	3
8	Pedro Ken	(Brazil)	MF	20 March 1987 (aged 30)	Cruzeiro	2016		6	0
	Dmitri Yashin	(Russia)	DF	25 April 1993 (aged 24)	Trainee	2013		0	0

=== Youth squad ===
Note: Flags indicate national team as defined under FIFA eligibility rules; some limited exceptions apply. Players may hold more than one non-FIFA nationality.

No.	Pos.	Nation	Player
38	FW	RUS	Magomed Abdureshedov
39	FW	RUS	Ali Khusainov
45	DF	RUS	Imran Alsultanov
49	FW	RUS	Khalid Ismailov
52	DF	RUS	Abdurakhman Akhilgov
53	MF	RUS	Bilal Umarov
57	DF	RUS	Zubair Madayev
64	FW	RUS	Radzhab Isayev
66	MF	RUS	Beslan Adamov
67	DF	RUS	Khalid Saytkhadziyev
70	MF	RUS	Ayub Batsuyev

No.	Pos.	Nation	Player
76	DF	RUS	Arsen Adamov
79	MF	RUS	Adam Abdurakhmanov
84	MF	RUS	Turpal-Ali Malsagov
87	MF	RUS	Shamsudin Masayev
88	MF	RUS	Ayub Magamayev
90	DF	RUS	Idris Musluyev
91	FW	RUS	Idris Umayev
92	DF	RUS	Kerim Magamayev
98	MF	RUS	Chingiz Magomadov
99	FW	RUS	Taymaz Khizriyev

== Transfers ==
=== Summer ===
In: Note: Flags indicate national team as defined under FIFA eligibility rules; some limited exceptions apply. Players may hold more than one non-FIFA nationality.

No.	Pos.	Nation	Player

Out: Note: Flags indicate national team as defined under FIFA eligibility rules; some limited exceptions apply. Players may hold more than one non-FIFA nationality.

No.	Pos.	Nation	Player
24	DF	POL	Marcin Komorowski
27	GK	RUS	Ramzan Asayev
31	MF	POL	Maciej Rybus (to (France) Lyon)
36	DF	RUS	Magomed Adayev (to (Russia) Angusht Nazran)
37	GK	RUS	Turpal-Ali Debirov
41	FW	RUS	Khalim Yunusov
43	MF	RUS	Ismail Matayev
44	DF	RUS	Dzhabrail Kadiyev (to (Belarus) Belshina Bobruisk)
47	MF	RUS	Yunus Shaipov
60	MF	RUS	Akhyad Garisultanov
61	MF	RUS	Magomed Borshayev
65	FW	RUS	Zaur Osmayev (to (Russia) Angusht Nazran)
69	DF	RUS	Zalimkhan Maysultanov
72	MF	RUS	Saykha Abdurashidov
73	MF	RUS	Ruslani Mutoshvili
74	MF	RUS	Arbi Davlitgereyev
77	FW	RUS	Ali Kadyrov
78	MF	RUS	Aslan Yanarsayev (to (Russia) Pallasovka)
80	MF	RUS	Muslim Askhabov
81	GK	RUS	Magomed Mayrbekov
83	DF	RUS	Alibeg Gerayev
85	MF	RUS	Sharapudin Shalbuzov (to (Russia) Druzhba Maykop)
87	DF	RUS	Islam Akayev
89	MF	RUS	Yevgeni Degtyaryov (to (Russia) Saturn Ramenskoye)
93	FW	RUS	Apti Akhyadov (on loan to (Russia) Spartak Nalchik)
96	DF	RUS	Akhmed Abubakarov
97	GK	RUS	Rasul Umayev
99	FW	RUS	Movsar Askhabov
—	MF	RUS	Adlan Katsayev (to (Russia) SKA-Khabarovsk, previously on loan)

=== In ===
Date	Position	Nationality	Name	From	Fee	Ref.
1 June 2016	GK	(Russia)	Khamzat Nasurov	Academy	Promoted	
1 June 2016	MF	(Russia)	Magomed-Emi Dzhabrailov	Academy	Promoted	
1 June 2016	MF	(Russia)	Shamsudin Masayev	Academy	Promoted	
1 June 2016	FW	(Russia)	Magomed Abdureshedov	Academy	Promoted	
9 June 2016	MF	(Albania)	Bekim Balaj	Rijeka	Undisclosed	
14 June 2016	DF	(Russia)	Sergei Bryzgalov	Spartak Moscow	Undisclosed	
21 July 2016	MF	(Romania)	Gabriel Torje	Udinese	Undisclosed	
22 July 2016	MF	(Albania)	Odise Roshi	Rijeka	Undisclosed	
1 August 2016	DF	(Venezuela)	Wilker Ángel	Deportivo Táchira	Undisclosed	
4 January 2017	MF	(Kosovo)	Bernard Berisha	Anzhi Makhachkala	Undisclosed	

=== Out ===
Date	Position	Nationality	Name	To	Fee	Ref.
3 February 2017	DF	(Russia)	Sergei Bryzgalov	Anzhi Makhachkala	Undisclosed	
13 February 2017	DF	(Russia)	Dmitri Yashin	Krumkachy Minsk	Undisclosed	

=== Loans in ===
Date from	Position	Nationality	Name	From	Date to	Ref.
13 February 2017	MF	(Russia)	Magomed Ozdoyev	Rubin Kazan	End of Season	
16 February 2017	DF	(Slovakia)	Norbert Gyömbér	Roma	End of Season	

=== Released ===
Date	Position	Nationality	Name	Joined	Date
30 August 2016	DF	(Australia)	Luke Wilkshire	Dynamo Moscow	31 August 2016
1 January 2017	MF	(Russia)	Magomed-Emi Dzhabrailov	Austria Klagenfurt	
28 February 2017	MF	(Brazil)	Adílson	Atlético Mineiro	3 March 2017
15 March 2017	MF	(Brazil)	Pedro Ken	Ceará	
23 May 2017	GK	(Ukraine)	Yaroslav Hodzyur	Ural Yekaterinburg	14 June 2017
23 May 2017	MF	(Romania)	Gheorghe Grozav	Karabükspor	27 July 2017
23 May 2017	FW	(Russia)	Igor Lebedenko	Ararat Moscow	
31 May 2017	GK	(Russia)	Ibragim-Sayfullakh Gaziyev		
31 May 2017	MF	(Russia)	Ayub Magamayev		
31 May 2017	FW	(Russia)	Ruslan Khusainov		
31 May 2017	FW	(Russia)	Bilal Umarov		

== Competitions ==
=== Russian Premier League ===
==== Results by round ====
Round	1	2	3	4	5	6	7	8	9	10	11	12	13	14	15	16	17	18	19	20	21	22	23	24	25	26	27	28	29	30
Ground	H	A	H	A	H	A	H	A	H	A	H	A	H	H	H	H	A	H	A	H	A	H	A	H	A	H	A	A	A	A
Result	W	L	D	W	W	L	L	D	W	D	W	W	W	D	L	W	L	L	D	L	D	W	L	L	W	W	W	W	L	W
Position	5	7	9	7	3	5	7	8	7	7	5	4	3	4	5	4	4	5	6	8	7	5	6	8	6	6	5	5	6	5

Updated to match(es) played on 21 May 2017. Source: See results
A = Away; H = Home; W = Win; D = Draw; L = Loss

==== Matches ====
31 July 2016 1	Terek Grozny	1 – 0	Krylia Sovetov	Grozny
20:30 MSK (UTC+3)	Grozav (yellow card) 69' (goal) 75' (pen.)	Summary	Taranov (yellow card) 44'; Kornilenko (yellow card) 88'	Stadium: Akhmat-Arena; Attendance: 18,783; Referee: Aleksey Eskov

8 August 2016 2	Krasnodar	4 – 0	Terek Grozny	Krasnodar
19:30 MSK (UTC+3)	Smolov 33', 77'; Kaboré (yellow card) 38'; Ari (yellow card) 39' (goal) 54'; Granqvist (yellow card) 73'; Wánderson 88'	Summary	Rodolfo (yellow card) 71'; Píriz (yellow card) 76'	Stadium: Kuban Stadium; Attendance: 7,930; Referee: Vladimir Seldyakov

14 August 2016 3	Terek Grozny	1 – 1	Lokomotiv Moscow	Grozny
20:30 MSK (UTC+3)	Ivanov 5' (yellow card) 78'; Semyonov (yellow card) 29'	Summary	Pejčinović (yellow card) 32' (yellow-red card) 78'; Škuletić 35'; Denisov (yellow card) 37'; N'Dinga (yellow card) 62'	Stadium: Akhmat-Arena; Attendance: 14,720; Referee: Vladislav Bezborodov

20 August 2016 4	Ufa	1 – 3	Terek Grozny	Ufa
14:30 MSK (UTC+3)	Nikitin (yellow card) 34'; Oblyakov (yellow card) 69'; Fatai 75' (yellow card) 90+1'	Summary	Grozav (yellow card) 19' (goal) 89'; Balaj 48'; Ivanov (yellow card) 79'; Rodolfo (yellow card) 81'; Sadayev 87'	Stadium: Neftyanik Stadium; Attendance: 4,800; Referee: Igor Fedotov

28 August 2016 5	Terek Grozny	2 – 1	Rostov	Grozny
19:15 MSK (UTC+3)	Semyonov (yellow card) 30'; Balaj 33'; Ángel 35'; Utsiev (yellow card) 54'	Summary	Utsiev 31' (o.g.); Bukharov (yellow card) 41'; Ezatolahi (yellow card) 51'; Gațcan (yellow card) 53' (yellow-red card) 70'; Kalachou (yellow card) 63'	Stadium: Akhmat-Arena; Attendance: 14,372; Referee: Aleksei Matyunin

9 September 2016 6	CSKA Moscow	3 – 0	Terek Grozny	Moscow
20:30 MSK (UTC+3)	Traoré 26', 38'; Wernbloom (yellow card) 45'; Strandberg 76'	Summary	Semyonov (yellow card) 45' (yellow-red card) 59'	Stadium: Arena CSKA; Attendance: 26,420; Referee: Vitaly Meshkov

17 September 2016 7	Terek Grozny	1 – 3	Amkar Perm	Grozny
19:00 MSK (UTC+3)	Rodolfo 9' (yellow card) 90+1'; Píriz (yellow card) 34'; Sadayev (yellow card) 74'	Summary	Miljković 26'; Gol (yellow card) 31' (goal) 74' (pen.); Dzhikiya (yellow card) 49'; Zaytsev 51'; Kostyukov (yellow card) 90+1'; Bodul (yellow card) 90+3'	Stadium: Akhmat-Arena; Attendance: 14,735; Referee: Alexey Nikolaev

25 September 2016 8	Arsenal Tula	0 – 0	Terek Grozny	Tula
14:30 MSK (UTC+3)	Gorbatyuk (yellow card) 24'; Berkhamov (yellow card) 77'; Denisov (yellow card) 84'; Ryzhkov (yellow card) 90+1'	Summary	Pliyev (yellow card) 66'; Píriz (yellow card) 77'	Stadium: Arsenal Stadium; Attendance: 6,800; Referee: Vladislav Bezborodov

1 October 2016 9	Terek Grozny	2 – 1	Orenburg	Grozny
19:30 MSK (UTC+3)	Semyonov (yellow card) 17'; Balaj 25'; Roshi (yellow card) 53'; Lebedenko 86'	Summary	Vosiyev (yellow card) 27'; Oyewole (yellow card) 42'; Georgiev 90+3' (pen.)	Stadium: Akhmat-Arena; Attendance: 12,320; Referee: Sergey Karasev

17 October 2016 10	Anzhi Makhachkala	0 – 0	Terek Grozny	Kaspiysk
19:30 MSK (UTC+3)	Xandão (yellow card) 57'	Summary	Píriz (yellow card) 22' (yellow-red card) 82'; Ángel (yellow card) 65'; Gorodov (yellow card) 90+2'	Stadium: Anzhi Arena; Attendance: 7,200; Referee: Aleksei Matyunin

22 October 2016 11	Terek Grozny	3 – 1	Rubin Kazan	Grozny
19:30 MSK (UTC+3)	Balaj 18' (yellow card) 87'; Ivanov (yellow card) 60'; Semyonov (yellow card) 61'; Grozav 71' (pen.); Mohammadi (yellow card) 78'; Roshi 90+3' (yellow card) 90+4'	Summary	Jonathas 34'; Caktaš (red card) 60'; Zambrano (yellow card) 69' (yellow-red card) 70'	Stadium: Akhmat-Arena; Attendance: 12,300; Referee: Sergey Lapochkin

30 October 2016 12	Ural Yekaterinburg	1 – 4	Terek Grozny	Yekaterinburg
12:00 MSK (UTC+3)	Chanturia 11' (pen.)	Summary	Balaj 43', 56'; Ivanov (yellow card) 55'; Dinga 59' (o.g.); Mbengue 90+1'	Stadium: SKB-Bank Arena; Attendance: 3,050; Referee: Aleksey Eskov

6 November 2016 13	Terek Grozny	2 – 1	Zenit St.Petersburg	Grozny
17:00 MSK (UTC+3)	Balaj 34', 38'; Roshi (yellow card) 42'; Utsiyev (yellow card) 52'; Kuzyayev (yellow card) 68'	Summary	Mak 10'; Criscito (yellow card) 54'; Neto (yellow card) 55' (yellow-red card) 90+2'; Witsel (yellow card) 87'	Stadium: Akhmat-Arena; Attendance: 16,708; Referee: Sergey Karasev

21 November 2016 14	Terek Grozny	0 – 0	Tom Tomsk	Grozny
19:00 MSK (UTC+3)		Summary	Kovalchuk (yellow card) 32'; Kasyan (yellow card) 36'; Dudiyev (yellow card) 53'; Samodin (yellow card) 90+3'	Stadium: Akhmat-Arena; Attendance: 11,200; Referee: Evgeny Turbin

26 November 2016 15	Terek Grozny	0 – 1	Spartak Moscow	Grozny
18:00 MSK (UTC+3)	Roshi (yellow card) 68'; Balaj (yellow card) 86'	Summary	Kutepov (yellow card) 10'; Maurício 27'	Stadium: Akhmat-Arena; Attendance: 15,232; Referee: Vitali Meshkov

1 December 2016 16	Terek Grozny	2 – 1	Krasnodar	Grozny
18:00 MSK (UTC+3)	Píriz 25'; Grozav 33'	Summary	Torbinski (yellow card) 39'; Bystrov (yellow card) 43'; Ángel 72' (o.g.); Naldo (yellow card) 80'	Stadium: Akhmat-Arena; Attendance: 15,235; Referee: Igor Fedotov

4 December 2016 17	Lokomotiv Moscow	2 – 0	Terek Grozny	Moscow
16:00 MSK (UTC+3)	Miranchuk 23'; N'Dinga (yellow card) 73'; Fernandes 75'	Summary	Mohammadi (yellow card) 57'	Stadium: Lokomotiv Stadium; Attendance: 6,282; Referee: Sergey Lapochkin

5 March 2017 18	Terek Grozny	0 – 1	Ufa	Grozny
19:00 MSK (UTC+3)		Summary	Sysuyev (yellow card) 20'; Paurević (yellow card) 45'; Igboun 79'	Stadium: Akhmat-Arena; Attendance: 17,753; Referee: Sergey Karasev

12 March 2017 19	Rostov	0 – 0	Terek Grozny	Rostov-on-Don
19:00 MSK (UTC+3)	Navas (yellow card) 16'; Kireyev (yellow card) 28'; Gațcan (yellow card) 64'	Summary	Kuzyayev (yellow card) 70'	Stadium: Olimp-2; Attendance: 9,734; Referee: Aleksey Eskov

19 March 2017 20	Terek Grozny	0 – 1	CSKA Moscow	Grozny
16:30 MSK (UTC+3)	Kuzyayev (yellow card) 88'	Summary	Ionov 28'; Berezutski (yellow card) 90+4'	Stadium: Akhmat-Arena; Attendance: 18,656; Referee: Sergey Ivanov

2 April 2017 21	Amkar Perm	1 – 1	Terek Grozny	Perm
13:30 MSK (UTC+3)	Gigolayev 9'	Summary	Roshi (yellow card) 18'; Mitrishev 31'; Utsiyev (yellow card) 69'	Stadium: Zvezda Stadium; Attendance: 6,300; Referee: Aleksei Matyunin

8 April 2017 22	Terek Grozny	3 – 1	Arsenal Tula	Grozny
16:30 MSK (UTC+3)	Mitrishev 5', 20'; Gyömbér (yellow card) 76'; Berisha 90+1'	Summary	Doumbia (yellow card) 57'; Bourceanu (yellow card) 66'; Rasic 77' (pen.)	Stadium: Akhmat-Arena; Attendance: 18,735; Referee: Kirill Levnikov

16 April 2017 23	Orenburg	2 – 1	Terek Grozny	Orenburg
12:30 MSK (UTC+3)	Popović 27'; Ďuriš (yellow card) 31'; Pliyev 89' (o.g.)	Summary	Ángel (yellow card) 3'; Grozav 73'; Pliyev (yellow card) 79'	Stadium: Gazovik Stadium; Attendance: 5,123; Referee: Aleksey Eskov

22 April 2017 24	Terek Grozny	0 – 1	Anzhi Makhachkala	Grozny
19:00 MSK (UTC+3)	Roshi (yellow card) 12'	Summary	Forbes 14' (yellow card) 52'; Dudiyev (yellow card) 30'; Yurchenko (yellow card) 90+4'; Katsayev (yellow card) 90+5'	Stadium: Akhmat-Arena; Attendance: 15,537; Referee: Roman Galimov

26 April 2017 26	Rubin Kazan	0 – 1	Terek Grozny	Kazan
19:30 MSK (UTC+3)	Caktaš (yellow card) 30'; Zambrano (yellow card) 76'; M'Vila (yellow card) 76'; Sánchez (yellow card) 83'	Summary	Kuzyayev (yellow card) 15'; Pliyev (yellow card) 24'; Mbengue 44'; Rodolfo (yellow card) 83'	Stadium: Kazan Arena; Attendance: 15,121; Referee: Evgeny Turbin

29 April 2017 26	Terek Grozny	5 – 2	Ural Yekaterinburg	Grozny
19:00 MSK (UTC+3)	Mbengue 33', 63'; Sadayev 67'; Lebedenko 83'; Mohammadi 90+2'	Summary	Pavlyuchenko 21'; Pankov (yellow card) 36'; Scherbakov (yellow card) 56'; Manucharyan 82'	Stadium: Akhmat-Arena; Attendance: 12,168; Referee: Artem Chistyakov

7 May 2017 27	Zenit St.Petersburg	0 – 1	Terek Grozny	Saint Petersburg
19:00 MSK (UTC+3)	Shatov (yellow card) 70' (red card) 90+6'	Summary	Mohammadi (yellow card) 27'; Mbengue 65'	Stadium: Krestovsky Stadium; Attendance: 30,673; Referee: Vladimir Seldyakov

14 May 2017 28	Tom Tomsk	1 – 2	Terek Grozny	Tomsk
12:00 MSK (UTC+3)	Popov (yellow card) 27'; Pugin (yellow card) 38'; Sasin (yellow card) 65'; Salakhutdinov 80'	Report	Torje (yellow card) 19'; Lebedenko 60'; Mbengue 62'; Ivanov (yellow card) 74'	Stadium: Trud Stadium; Attendance: 3,250; Referee: Aleksei Matyunin

17 May 2017 29	Spartak Moscow	3 – 0	Terek Grozny	Moscow
19:30 MSK (UTC+3)	Glushakov 15', 19'; Popov (yellow card) 23'; Promes 74' (yellow card) 74'	Report	Píriz (yellow card) 45+1'	Stadium: Otkrytiye Arena; Attendance: 43,602; Referee: Kirill Levnikov

21 May 2017 30	Krylia Sovetov	1 – 3	Terek Grozny	Samara
15:00 MSK (UTC+3)	Bruno (yellow card) 64' (goal) 90' (pen.); Tkachyov (yellow card) 69'	Report	Gyömbér (yellow card) 31'; Mbengue 37'; Mohammadi 56'; Pliyev (yellow card) 64'; Balaj (yellow card) 76'	Stadium: Metallurg Stadium; Attendance: 4,623; Referee: Alexey Nikolaev

==== League table ====
Pos	Team	Pld	W	D	L	GF	GA	GD	Pts	Qualification or relegation
3	Zenit Saint Petersburg	30	18	7	5	50	19	+31	61	Qualification for the Europa League third qualifying round
4	Krasnodar	30	12	13	5	40	22	+18	49	Qualification for the Europa League third qualifying round
5	Terek Grozny	30	14	6	10	38	35	+3	48	
6	Rostov	30	13	9	8	36	18	+18	48	
7	Ufa	30	12	7	11	22	25	−3	43	

Source: Russian Premier League, Soccerway
Rules for classification: 1) Points; 2) Matches won; 3) Head-to-head points; 4) Head-to-head matches won; 5) Head-to-head goal difference; 6) Head-to-head goals scored; 7) Head-to-head away goals; 8) Goal difference; 9) Goals scored; 10) Away goals scored.

=== Russian Cup ===
21 September 2016 Round of 32	Fakel Voronezh	1 – 1 (a.e.t.) (3 – 5 p)	Terek Grozny	Voronezh
19:00 MSK (UTC+3)	Troshechkin 33'	Summary	Lebedenko 57'	Stadium: Tsentralnyi Profsoyuz Stadion; Attendance: 920; Referee: Oleg Sokolov
	Penalties
	Bolov (penalty scored); Solovyov (penalty missed); Troshechkin (penalty scored); Drannikov (penalty scored)		(penalty scored) Ivanov; (penalty scored) Torje; (penalty scored) Semyonov; (penalty scored) Ángel; (penalty scored) Grozav

26 October 2016 Round of 16	Terek Grozny	1 – 1 (a.e.t.) (3 – 4 p)	Ufa	Grozny
19:00 MSK (UTC+3)	Stotsky 53' (o.g.); Kuzyayev (yellow card) 55'; Utsiyev (yellow card) 63'; Semyonov (yellow card) 96'	Summary	Ángel 11' (o.g.); Zaseyev (yellow card) 66'; Nikitin (yellow card) 80'; Shelia (yellow card) 114'	Stadium: Akhmat-Arena; Attendance: 11,250; Referee: Artyom Chistyakov
	Penalties
	Balaj (penalty scored); Píriz (penalty missed); Semyonov (penalty missed); Rodolfo (penalty scored); Grozav (penalty scored)		(penalty scored) Fatai; (penalty scored) Igboun; (penalty scored) Marcinho; (penalty missed) Stotsky; (penalty scored) Zaseyev

== Squad statistics ==
As of Match played 21 May 2017

=== Appearances and goals ===
No.	Pos	Nat	Player	Total		Premier League		Russian Cup	
No.	Pos	Nat	Player	Apps	Goals	Apps	Goals	Apps	Goals
2	DF	(Brazil) BRA	Rodolfo	18	1	12+5	1	0+1	0
3	DF	(Slovakia) SVK	Norbert Gyömbér	7	0	6+1	0	0	0
4	DF	(Venezuela) VEN	Wilker Ángel	28	1	25+1	1	2	0
5	DF	(Russia) RUS	Zaurbek Pliyev	12	0	9+1	0	1+1	0
9	FW	(Russia) RUS	Zaur Sadayev	8	2	0+7	2	1	0
10	MF	(Romania) ROU	Gheorghe Grozav	23	5	16+5	5	2	0
13	DF	(Iran) IRI	Milad Mohammadi	25	2	23+1	2	1	0
14	MF	(Russia) RUS	Daler Kuzyayev	27	0	26	0	1	0
15	DF	(Russia) RUS	Andrei Semyonov	30	0	28	0	2	0
16	GK	(Russia) RUS	Yevgeni Gorodov	31	0	29	0	2	0
17	FW	(Senegal) SEN	Ablaye Mbengue	23	7	8+14	7	0+1	0
18	FW	(Albania) ALB	Bekim Balaj	27	9	22+4	9	1	0
19	MF	(Russia) RUS	Oleg Ivanov	30	1	25+3	1	2	0
20	MF	(Romania) ROU	Gabriel Torje	11	0	4+6	0	0+1	0
21	MF	(Albania) ALB	Odise Roshi	20	1	12+7	1	1	0
22	MF	(Russia) RUS	Reziuan Mirzov	9	0	2+7	0	0	0
23	MF	(Uruguay) URU	Facundo Píriz	27	1	24+1	1	2	0
27	MF	(Russia) RUS	Magomed Ozdoyev	6	0	4+2	0	0	0
33	GK	(Russia) RUS	Vitali Gudiyev	1	0	1	0	0	0
40	DF	(Russia) RUS	Rizvan Utsiyev	30	0	28	0	2	0
55	FW	(Russia) RUS	Igor Lebedenko	18	4	9+8	3	1	1
77	MF	(Kosovo) KOS	Bernard Berisha	8	1	3+5	1	0	0
95	FW	(Russia) RUS	Magomed Mitrishev	22	3	13+7	3	1+1	0
Players away from the club on loan:
Players who appeared for Terek Grozny no longer at the club:
3	DF	(Russia) RUS	Sergei Bryzgalov	4	0	2+2	0	0	0
6	MF	(Brazil) BRA	Adílson	3	0	2+1	0	0	0
8	MF	(Brazil) BRA	Pedro Ken	1	0	1	0	0	0

=== Goal scorers ===
Place	Position	Nation	Number	Name	Premier League	Russian Cup	Total
1	FW	(Albania)	18	Bekim Balaj	9	0	9
2	FW	(Senegal)	17	Ablaye Mbengue	7	0	7
3	FW	(Romania)	10	Gheorghe Grozav	5	0	5
4	FW	(Russia)	55	Igor Lebedenko	3	1	4
5	FW	(Russia)	95	Magomed Mitrishev	3	0	3
6	FW	(Russia)	9	Zaur Sadayev	2	0	2
6	DF	(Iran)	13	Milad Mohammadi	2	0	2
6				Own goal	1	1	2
9	MF	(Russia)	19	Oleg Ivanov	1	0	1
9	DF	(Venezuela)	4	Wilker Ángel	1	0	1
9	DF	(Brazil)	2	Rodolfo	1	0	1
9	MF	(Albania)	21	Odise Roshi	1	0	1
9	MF	(Uruguay)	23	Facundo Píriz	1	0	1
9	MF	(Kosovo)	77	Bernard Berisha	1	0	1
				TOTALS	38	2	40

=== Disciplinary record ===
Number	Nation	Position	Name	Premier League		Russian Cup		Total	
Number	Nation	Position	Name	Yellow card	Red card	Yellow card	Red card	Yellow card	Red card
2	(Brazil)	DF	Rodolfo	4	0	0	0	4	0
3	(Slovakia)	DF	Norbert Gyömbér	2	0	0	0	2	0
4	(Venezuela)	DF	Wilker Ángel	2	0	0	0	2	0
5	(Russia)	DF	Zaurbek Pliyev	4	0	0	0	4	0
9	(Russia)	FW	Zaur Sadayev	1	0	0	0	1	0
10	(Romania)	FW	Gheorghe Grozav	2	0	0	0	2	0
13	(Russia)	DF	Milad Mohammadi	3	0	0	0	3	0
14	(Russia)	MF	Daler Kuzyayev	4	0	1	0	5	0
15	(Russia)	DF	Andrei Semyonov	6	1	1	0	7	1
16	(Russia)	GK	Yevgeni Gorodov	1	0	0	0	1	0
18	(Albania)	FW	Bekim Balaj	2	0	0	0	2	0
19	(Russia)	MF	Oleg Ivanov	5	0	0	0	5	0
20	(Romania)	MF	Gabriel Torje	1	0	0	0	1	0
21	(Albania)	MF	Odise Roshi	6	0	0	0	6	0
23	(Uruguay)	MF	Facundo Píriz	6	1	0	0	6	1
40	(Russia)	DF	Rizvan Utsiyev	3	0	1	0	4	0
			TOTALS	52	2	3	0	55	2
