= 2017–18 FC Akhmat Grozny season =

FC Akhmat Grozny
2017–18 season
- Chairman: Magomed Daudov
- Manager: Oleg Kononov (until 30 October); Mikhail Galaktionov (caretaker) (30 October-14 December); Mikhail Galaktionov (from 14 December 2017-7 April 2018); Igor Lediakhov (caretaker) (from 7 April 2018)
- Stadium: Akhmat-Arena
- Premier League: 9th
- Russian Cup: Round of 32 vs Yenisey Krasnoyarsk
- Top goalscorer: League: Five Players (3); All: Magomed Mitrishev (5)
- Highest home attendance: Magomed Mitrishev (5)
Home colours	Away colours

The 2017–18 FC Akhmat Grozny season was the ninth successive season the club played in the Russian Premier League, the highest tier of association football in Russia, and their first as Akhmat Grozny. On 7 June 2017, the club announced the name change from Terek Grozny to Akhmat Grozny, in celebration of Akhmad Kadyrov.

That season, Akhmat Grozny also took part in the Russian Cup, losing 3–0 to FC Yenisey Krasnoyarsk in the third round.

== Season events ==
At the end of the 2016–17 season, Oleg Kononov was appointed the new manager of Akhmat Grozny. On 30 October 2017, Kononov resigned as manager, with Mikhail Galaktionov taking over in a caretaker capacity the same day, before being appointed the club's permanent manager on 14 December 2017. Galaktionov himself resigned as manager on 7 April 2018, with Igor Lediakhov being appointed as the club's caretaker manager.

== Transfers ==
=== In ===
Date	Position	Nationality	Name	From	Fee	Ref.
20 June 2017	MF	(Brazil)	Ravanelli	Ponte Preta	Undisclosed	
1 July 2017	MF	(Russia)	Anton Shvets	Villarreal B	Undisclosed	
2 July 2017	DF	(Brazil)	Philipe Sampaio	Boavista	Undisclosed	
5 July 2017	FW	(Brazil)	Léo Jabá	Corinthians	Undisclosed	
9 August 2017	MF	(Brazil)	Ismael	Kalmar	Undisclosed	
31 August 2017	MF	(Russia)	Roland Gigolayev	Amkar Perm	Undisclosed	
1 January 2018	GK	(Russia)	Ramzan Mutuskhanov	Academy	Promoted	
1 January 2018	DF	(Russia)	Mursalin Denilkanov	Academy	Promoted	
1 January 2018	DF	(Russia)	Nikita Karmayev	Academy	Promoted	
1 January 2018	MF	(Russia)	Said-Akhmed Tsatiyev	Academy	Promoted	
1 January 2018	MF	(Russia)	Ilya Moseychuk	Academy	Promoted	
1 January 2018	MF	(Russia)	Khamzat Gabanukayev	Academy	Promoted	
1 January 2018	MF	(Russia)	Magomed-Emi Khakiyev	Academy	Promoted	
1 January 2018	MF	(Russia)	Lechi Sadulayev	Academy	Promoted	
1 January 2018	MF	(Russia)	Askhab Chunchurov	Academy	Promoted	
1 January 2018	FW	(Russia)	Islam Alsultanov	Academy	Promoted	

=== Out ===
Date	Position	Nationality	Name	To	Fee	Ref.
14 June 2017	MF	(Russia)	Daler Kuzyayev	Zenit St.Petersburg	Undisclosed	
28 July 2017	MF	(Russia)	Reziuan Mirzov	Rostov	Undisclosed	
	DF	(Russia)	Zubayr Madayev	Shinnik Yaroslavl	Undisclosed	

=== Loans in ===
Date from	Position	Nationality	Name	From	Date to	Ref.
16 February 2018	GK	(Russia)	Aleksandr Sheplyakov	CRFSO Smolensk	End of Season	

=== Loans out ===
Date from	Position	Nationality	Name	To	Date to	Ref.
24 June 2017	MF	(Russia)	Adlan Katsayev	Anzhi Makhachkala	17 January 2018	
17 July 2017	MF	(Romania)	Gabriel Torje	Karabükspor		
28 July 2017	MF	(Uruguay)	Facundo Píriz	Montpellier	End of Season	
15 July 2017	DF	(Russia)	Idris Musluyev	Spartak Nalchik	End of Season	
15 July 2017	DF	(Russia)	Khalid Shakhtiyev	Spartak Nalchik	End of Season	
15 July 2017	MF	(Russia)	Chingiz Magomadov	Spartak Nalchik	End of Season	
2 February 2018	MF	(Romania)	Gabriel Torje	Dinamo București	End of Season	
	DF	(Russia)	Idris Musluyev	Angusht Nazran	End of Season	
	DF	(Russia)	Khalid Shakhtiyev	Chayka Peschanokopskoye	End of Season	

=== Released ===
Date	Position	Nationality	Name	Joined	Date
1 January 2018	GK	(Russia)	Khamzat Nasurov		
	MF	(Romania)	Gabriel Torje	Sivasspor	1 September 2018
1 January 2018	MF	(Russia)	Beslan Adamov		
1 January 2018	MF	(Russia)	Turpal-Ali Malsagov		
1 January 2018	MF	(Russia)	Shamsudin Masayev		
1 January 2018	MF	(Russia)	Islam Ediyev		
30 June 2018	MF	(Uruguay)	Facundo Píriz	Montpellier	1 July 2018
1 January 2018	FW	(Russia)	Magomed Abdureshedov		
1 January 2018	FW	(Russia)	Khalid Ismailov		
1 January 2018	FW	(Russia)	Ali Khusainov		
31 May 2018	DF	(Russia)	Abdurakhman Akhilgov	Angusht Nazran	

== Squad ==
As of match played 13 May 2018

No.	Name	Nationality	Position	Date of birth (age)	Signed from	Signed in	Contract ends	Apps.	Goals
Goalkeepers
16	Yevgeni Gorodov	(Russia)	GK	13 December 1985 (aged 32)	Krasnodar	2013		89	0
31	Aleksandr Sheplyakov	(Russia)	GK	13 August 1996 (aged 21)	loan from CRFSO Smolensk	2018		0	0
33	Vitali Gudiyev	(Russia)	GK	22 April 1995 (aged 23)	Alania Vladikavkaz	2014		11	0
35	Ibragim-Sayfullakh Gaziyev	(Russia)	GK	13 November 1996 (aged 21)	Academy	2014		0	0
Defenders
2	Rodolfo	(Brazil)	DF	23 October 1982 (aged 35)	Vasco da Gama	2015		74	4
3	Zaurbek Pliyev	(Russia)	DF	27 September 1991 (aged 26)	Kairat	2015	2019	34	0
4	Wilker Ángel	(Venezuela)	DF	18 March 1993 (aged 25)	Deportivo Táchira	2016		55	4
13	Milad Mohammadi	(Iran)	DF	29 September 1993 (aged 24)	Rah Ahan Tehran	2016	2019	52	2
15	Andrei Semyonov	(Russia)	DF	24 March 1989 (aged 29)	Amkar Perm	2014		134	2
40	Rizvan Utsiyev	(Russia)	DF	7 February 1988 (aged 30)	Trainee	2005		218	8
52	Abdurakhman Akhilgov	(Russia)	DF	6 July 1998 (aged 19)	Academy	2015		0	0
94	Philipe Sampaio	(Brazil)	DF	11 November 1994 (aged 23)	Boavista	2017	2021	15	1
Midfielders
11	Ismael	(Brazil)	MF	1 December 1994 (aged 23)	Kalmar	2017	2021	25	3
14	Ravanelli	(Brazil)	MF	29 August 1997 (aged 20)	Ponte Preta	2017	2021	13	1
19	Oleg Ivanov	(Russia)	MF	4 August 1986 (aged 31)	Rostov	2012		171	9
21	Odise Roshi	(Albania)	MF	22 May 1991 (aged 26)	HNK Rijeka	2016	2019	41	2
22	Adlan Katsayev	(Russia)	MF	20 February 1988 (aged 30)	Trainee	2005			
23	Anton Shvets	(Russia)	MF	26 April 1993 (aged 25)	Villarreal B	2017	2021	46	3
24	Roland Gigolayev	(Russia)	MF	4 January 1990 (aged 28)	Amkar Perm	2017	2020	1	0
70	Ayub Batsuyev	(Russia)	MF	9 February 1997 (aged 21)	Academy	2013		6	0
77	Bernard Berisha	(Kosovo)	MF	24 October 1991 (aged 26)	Anzhi Makhachkala	2017	2020	32	2
Forwards
7	Abubakar Kadyrov	(Russia)	FW	26 August 1996 (aged 21)	Trainee	2012		0	0
8	Léo Jabá	(Brazil)	FW	2 August 1998 (aged 19)	Corinthians	2017	2022	25	3
9	Zaur Sadayev	(Russia)	FW	6 November 1989 (aged 28)	Trainee	2006		133	19
10	Khalid Kadyrov	(Russia)	FW	19 April 1994 (aged 24)	Trainee	2010		16	1
17	Ablaye Mbengue	(Senegal)	FW	19 May 1992 (aged 25)	Sapins	2015		68	16
18	Bekim Balaj	(Albania)	FW	11 January 1991 (aged 27)	HNK Rijeka	2016	2019	40	9
91	Idris Umayev	(Russia)	FW	15 January 1999 (aged 19)	Academy	2016		0	0
93	Apti Akhyadov	(Russia)	FW	24 August 1993 (aged 24)	Trainee	2011		6	0
95	Magomed Mitrishev	(Russia)	FW	10 September 1992 (aged 25)	Spartak Nalchik	2012		101	16
Away on loan
	Gabriel Torje	(Romania)	MF	22 November 1989 (aged 28)	Udinese	2011			
	Facundo Píriz	(Uruguay)	MF	24 August 1993 (aged 24)	Nacional	2013	2018	76	3

=== Out on loan ===
Note: Flags indicate national team as defined under FIFA eligibility rules; some limited exceptions apply. Players may hold more than one non-FIFA nationality.

No.	Pos.	Nation	Player
—	MF	ROU	Gabriel Torje (at Dinamo București until 30 June 2018)
—	MF	URU	Facundo Píriz (at Montpellier until 30 June 2018)

=== Youth squad ===
Note: Flags indicate national team as defined under FIFA eligibility rules; some limited exceptions apply. Players may hold more than one non-FIFA nationality.

No.	Pos.	Nation	Player
38	FW	RUS	Magomed Abdureshedov
39	FW	RUS	Ali Khusainov
45	DF	RUS	Imran Alsultanov
49	FW	RUS	Khalid Ismailov
53	MF	RUS	Bilal Umarov
57	DF	RUS	Zubair Madayev
64	FW	RUS	Radzhab Isayev
66	MF	RUS	Beslan Adamov

No.	Pos.	Nation	Player
67	DF	RUS	Khalid Saytkhadziyev
76	DF	RUS	Arsen Adamov
79	MF	RUS	Adam Abdurakhmanov
84	MF	RUS	Turpal-Ali Malsagov
87	MF	RUS	Shamsudin Masayev
88	MF	RUS	Ayub Magamayev
92	DF	RUS	Kerim Magamayev
99	FW	RUS	Taymaz Khizriyev

== Friendlies ==
15 June 2017	Akhmat Grozny (Russia)	1 – 0	(Azerbaijan) Gabala	Jenbach, Austria
19:00 MSK (UTC+3)	Sadayev 49'	Report

20 June 2017	Akhmat Grozny (Russia)	1 – 0	(Azerbaijan) Qarabağ	Kössen, Austria
18:00 MSK (UTC+3)	Ravanelli 88'	Report

25 July 2017	Akhmat Grozny (Russia)	5 – 1	(Austria) SV Wörgl	Austria
MSK (UTC+3)	Ravanelli; Mirzov; Balaj	Report	Goal

28 June 2017	Akhmat Grozny (Russia)	1 – 1	(Austria) Red Bull Salzburg	Kössen, Austria
18:00 MSK (UTC+3)	Shvets 55'	Report	Dabour 34' (pen.)

2 July 2017	Akhmat Grozny (Russia)	0 – 2	(Bulgaria) Ludogorets Razgrad	Austria
MSK (UTC+3)

5 July 2017	Akhmat Grozny (Russia)	4 – 1	(Switzerland) Young Boys	Austria
MSK (UTC+3)	K. Kadyrov; Sadayev; Utsiyev	Report	Goal

12 July 2017	Akhmat Grozny	5 – 1	Angusht Nazran
18:00 MSK (UTC+3)

== Competitions ==
=== Russian Premier League ===
==== Results by round ====
Round	1	2	3	4	5	6	7	8	9	10	11	12	13	14	15	16	17	18	19	20	21	22	23	24	25	26	27	28	29	30
Ground	H	A	H	A	H	A	H	A	H	A	H	A	H	A	H	H	A	H	A	H	A	H	H	A	H	A	A	H	A	A
Result	W	W	W	L	L	L	L	W	D	D	W	L	L	L	D	W	D	W	L	D	L	L	D	L	W	D	W	D	W	D
Position	5	4	3	3	6	6	8	7	7	7	5	6	9	9	9	9	9	6	7	7	8	9	10	12	10	10	10	10	8	9

Updated to match(es) played on 13 May 2018. Source: See Results
A = Away; H = Home; W = Win; D = Draw; L = Loss

==== Results ====
16 July 2017 1	Akhmat Grozny	1 – 0	Amkar Perm	Grozny
21:30 MSK (UTC+3)	Jabá 39'; Ravanelli (yellow card) 79'; Kadyrov (yellow card) 85'	Report	Sivakow (yellow card) 15'; Kostyukov (yellow card) 77'; Zanev (yellow card) 79'; Gasilin (yellow card) 90+2'	Stadium: Akhmat-Arena; Attendance: 29,450; Referee: Kirill Levnikov

23 July 2017 2	Rostov	0 – 1	Akhmat Grozny	Rostov-on-Don
20:00 MSK (UTC+3)	Doumbia (yellow card) 90+5'	Report	Sampaio (yellow card) 27'; Jabá (yellow card) 40'; Sadayev 54'; Rodolfo (yellow card) 61'; Berisha (yellow card) 90+1'	Stadium: Olimp-2; Attendance: 10,305; Referee: Roman Galimov

29 July 2017 3	Akhmat Grozny	2 – 0	Dynamo Moscow	Grozny
20:00 MSK (UTC+3)	Ravanelli (yellow card) 58'; Ángel (yellow card) 74'; Mitrishev 80'; Rodolfo 83' (pen.)	Report	Sosnin (yellow card) 19'; Kozlov (yellow card) 77'	Stadium: Akhmat-Arena; Attendance: 17,324; Referee: Vladislav Bezborodov

5 August 2017 4	Ufa	3 – 2	Akhmat Grozny	Ufa
15:00 MSK (UTC+3)	Igboun (yellow card) 53'; Stotsky (yellow card) 77'; Jokić 80'; Alikin 84'; Sysuyev 86'	Report	Jabá 48'; Ángel (yellow card) 53' (goal) 90+3'; Pliyev (yellow card) 82'	Stadium: Neftyanik Stadium; Attendance: 5,102; Referee: Vladimir Seldyakov

10 August 2017 5	Akhmat Grozny	2 – 3	Krasnodar	Grozny
20:00 MSK (UTC+3)	Rodolfo (yellow card) 41'; Ismael 73'; Shvets 90'	Report	Gazinsky (yellow card) 25'; Martynovich (yellow card) 30' (goal) 53'; Mamayev (yellow card) 41'; Claesson 76'; Ignatyev 90+2'	Stadium: Akhmat-Arena; Attendance: 17,342; Referee: Sergey Ivanov

13 August 2017 6	Zenit St.Petersburg	4 – 0	Akhmat Grozny	Saint Petersburg
20:00 MSK (UTC+3)	Criscito (yellow card) 26'; Paredes 28'; Kokorin 50'; Kuzyayev 68'; Zhirkov 84'	Report	Akhyadov (yellow card) 21'; Ángel (yellow card) 25'; Utsiyev (yellow card) 26' (yellow-red card) 29'; Ivanov (yellow card) 50'; Roshi (yellow card) 75'	Stadium: Krestovsky Stadium; Attendance: 45,470; Referee: Igor Fedotov

21 August 2017 7	Akhmat Grozny	1 – 2	Arsenal Tula	Grozny
20:00 MSK (UTC+3)	Shvets (yellow card) 55'; Sadayev 74'	Report	Tkachyov 30'; Đorđević 76' (yellow card) 77'; Álvarez (yellow card) 83'	Stadium: Akhmat-Arena; Attendance: 17,134; Referee: Vladimir Moskalyov

27 August 2017 8	CSKA Moscow	0 – 1	Akhmat Grozny	Moscow
17:30 MSK (UTC+3)		Report	Sadayev 45'; Ángel (yellow card) 53'; Gorodov (yellow card) 65'; Utsiyev (yellow card) 78'	Stadium: VEB Arena; Attendance: 16,400; Referee: Mikhail Vilkov

10 September 2017 9	Akhmat Grozny	1 – 1	Lokomotiv Moscow	Grozny
19:00 MSK (UTC+3)	Léo Jabá (yellow card) 66'; Ravanelli 84'; Ismael (yellow card) 90+4'; Semyonov (yellow card) 90+5'	Report	Rodolfo 55' (o.g.)	Stadium: Akhmat-Arena; Attendance: 16,570; Referee: Vladislav Bezborodov

17 September 2017 10	SKA-Khabarovsk	2 – 2	Akhmat Grozny	Khabarovsk
11:00 MSK (UTC+3)	Savichev 13'; Koryan (yellow card) 62'; Navalovski (yellow card) 83'; Hristov 88'	Report	Shvets (yellow card) 58' (goal) 82'; Mbengue 65'; Berisha (yellow card) 83'	Stadium: Lenin Stadium; Attendance: 7,447; Referee: Aleksei Eskov

25 September 2017 11	Akhmat Grozny	1 – 0	Rubin Kazan	Grozny
19:30 MSK (UTC+3)	Ozdoyev 85' (o.g.); Mbengue (yellow card) 88'; Rodolfo (yellow card) 89'; Gorodov (yellow card) 90+3'	Report		Stadium: Akhmat-Arena; Attendance: 8,345; Referee: Aleksey Sukhoy

30 September 2017 12	Tosno	1 – 0	Akhmat Grozny	Saint Petersburg
14:00 MSK (UTC+3)	Markov (yellow card) 25' (goal) 78'; Karnitsky (yellow card) 41'; Sukharev (yellow card) 65'; Trujić (yellow card) 81'; Shakhov (yellow card) 87'	Report	Shvets (yellow card) 23' (yellow-red card) 46'; Ángel (yellow card) 90+1'	Stadium: Petrovsky Stadium; Attendance: 4,757; Referee: Aleksei Nikolaev

13 October 2017 13	Akhmat Grozny	1 – 2	Spartak Moscow	Grozny
19:30 MSK (UTC+3)	Jabá (yellow card) 35'; Semyonov (yellow card) 39'; Rodolfo 70' (pen.)	Report	Glushakov 30'; Yeshchenko (yellow card) 50'; Melgarejo 72'; Selikhov (yellow card) 77'	Stadium: Akhmat-Arena; Attendance: 18,177; Referee: Sergey Lapochkin

22 October 2017 14	Ural Yekaterinburg	2 – 0	Akhmat Grozny	Yekaterinburg
14:00 MSK (UTC+3)	Boumal (yellow card) 26'; Dimitrov 33'; Balažic (yellow card) 53'; Ilyin (yellow card) 58'; Yevseyev 79'	Report	Shvets (yellow card) 5'; Semyonov (yellow card) 55'; Berisha (yellow card) 86'	Stadium: SKB-Bank Arena; Attendance: 2,386; Referee: Aleksei Nikolaev

30 October 2017 15	Akhmat Grozny	1 – 1	Anzhi Makhachkala	Grozny
19:30 MSK (UTC+3)	Berisha (yellow card) 77'; Ángel 90+3'; Mbengue (yellow card) 90+6'	Report	Bryzgalov (yellow card) 87'; Yakovlev (yellow card) 87' (goal) 90+6'	Stadium: Akhmat-Arena; Attendance: 16,372; Referee: Sergey Karasev

4 November 2017 16	Akhmat Grozny	1 – 0	Rostov	Grozny
19:00 MSK (UTC+3)	Ismael (yellow card) 41'; Mbengue 50'; Utsiyev (yellow card) 59'; Roshi (yellow card) 85'	Report	Gațcan (yellow card) 90+2'; Ustinov (yellow card) 90+3'	Stadium: Akhmat-Arena; Attendance: 12,487; Referee: Vladimir Seldyakov

18 November 2017 17	Dynamo Moscow	1 – 1	Akhmat Grozny	Khimki
14:00 MSK (UTC+3)	Lutsenko 62'; Holmén (yellow card) 64'	Report	Ángel 31'; Sampaio (yellow card) 83'	Stadium: Arena Khimki; Attendance: 3,329; Referee: Vladislav Bezborodov

25 November 2017 18	Akhmat Grozny	2 – 1	Ufa	Grozny
19:00 MSK (UTC+3)	Sampaio 45'; Léo Jabá 53'; Pliyev (yellow card) 86'; Rodolfo (yellow card) 90'	Report	Salatić (yellow card) 7'; Sysuyev (yellow card) 36'; Zhivoglyadov (yellow card) 44'; Oblyakov 87'	Stadium: Akhmat-Arena; Attendance: 11,318; Referee: Aleksei Eskov

3 December 2017 19	Krasnodar	3 – 2	Akhmat Grozny	Krasnodar
16:30 MSK (UTC+3)	Petrov (yellow card) 27'; Smolov (yellow card) 32' (goal) 52'; Pereyra (yellow card) 58'; Granqvist (penalty missed) 58' (yellow card) 79'; Mamayev 68' (yellow card) 68'; Ramírez (yellow card) 90'; Joãozinho 90+2'	Report	Ismael (yellow card) 18' (goal) 36'; Shvets 29' (yellow card) 32'; Utsiyev (yellow card) 37'; Gudiyev (yellow card) 84'	Stadium: Krasnodar Stadium; Attendance: 19,286; Referee: Sergey Ivanov

11 December 2017 20	FC Akhmat Grozny	0 – 0	Zenit St.Petersburg	Grozny
19:30 MSK (UTC+3)	Ivanov (yellow card) 26'; Philipe Sampaio (yellow card) 73'	Report	Zhirkov (yellow card) 27'; Paredes (yellow card) 73'	Stadium: Akhmat-Arena; Attendance: 15,532; Referee: Vladimir Seldyakov

4 March 2017 21	Arsenal Tula	1 – 0	Akhmat Grozny	Tula
19:00 MSK (UTC+3)	Khagush (yellow card) 80'; Čaušić 90+1' (yellow card) 90+1'; Grigalava (yellow card) 90+4'; Dzyuba (yellow card) 90+4'	Report	Rodolfo (red card) 90+4'; Semyonov (yellow card) 90+4'	Stadium: Arsenal Stadium; Attendance: 7,080; Referee: Vladislav Bezborodov

11 March 2018 22	Akhmat Grozny	0 – 3	CSKA Moscow	Grozny
16:30 MSK (UTC+3)	Utsiyev (yellow card) 52'	Report	Golovin 6'; Vitinho 28'; A. Berezutski (yellow card) 62'; Ignashevich 68'; Shchennikov (yellow card) 71'	Stadium: Akhmat-Arena; Attendance: 14,570; Referee: Sergey Ivanov

1 April 2018 24	Akhmat Grozny	0 – 0	SKA-Khabarovsk	Grozny
16:00 MSK (UTC+3)	Ivanov (yellow card) 38'; Sadayev (yellow card) 78'	Report	Ediyev (yellow card) 40'	Stadium: Akhmat-Arena; Attendance: 8,375; Referee: Sergey Karasev

7 April 2018 25	Rubin Kazan	3 – 2	Akhmat Grozny	Kazan
14:00 MSK (UTC+3)	Kuzmin (yellow card) 23'; Popov 49', 70'; Azmoun 63'; Sorokin (yellow card) 80'; Karadeniz (yellow card) 90+4'	Report	Mitrishev 1', 86'; Semyonov (yellow card) 10'; Mohammadi (yellow card) 55'; Ángel (yellow card) 62'	Stadium: Kazan Arena; Attendance: 3,099; Referee: Aleksei Matyunin

13 April 2018 26	Akhmat Grozny	1 – 0	Tosno	Grozny
19:30 MSK (UTC+3)	Rodolfo (yellow card) 40'; Roshi (yellow card) 47'; Mitrishev 53'; Ángel (yellow card) 85'	Report	Margasov (yellow card) 29'; Buivolov (yellow card) 77'	Stadium: Akhmat-Arena; Attendance: 12,341; Referee: Sergey Ivanov

18 April 2018 23	Lokomotiv Moscow	0 – 0	Akhmat Grozny	Moscow
19:30 MSK (UTC+3)	Kolomeytsev (yellow card) 58'; Tarasov (yellow card) 88'; Kvirkvelia (yellow card) 90+3'	Report	Shvets (yellow card) 8'; Ivanov (yellow card) 71'	Stadium: RZD Arena; Attendance: 10,075; Referee: Vladimir Moskalyov

23 April 2018 27	Spartak Moscow	1 – 3	Akhmat Grozny	Moscow
19:30 MSK (UTC+3)	Bocchetti (yellow card) 29'; Luiz Adriano (yellow card) 39' (goal) 86'	Report	Mitrishev 11'; Ismael 23'; Ángel (yellow card) 39'; Berisha 50'; Utsiyev (yellow card) 64'; Pliyev (yellow card) 69'	Stadium: Otkritie Arena; Attendance: 23,849; Referee: Mikhail Vilkov

30 April 2018 28	Akhmat Grozny	0 – 0	Ural Yekaterinburg	Grozny
16:30 MSK (UTC+3)		Report	Boumal (yellow card) 32'; Merkulov (yellow card) 39' (yellow-red card) 88'	Stadium: Akhmat-Arena; Attendance: 12,235; Referee: Aleksey Eskov

7 May 2018 29	Anzhi Makhachkala	0 – 2	Akhmat Grozny	Kaspiysk
19:30 MSK (UTC+3)	Tetrashvili (yellow card) 37' (yellow-red card) 62'; Poluyakhtov (yellow card) 45'; Samardžić (yellow card) 90+3'	Report	Rodolfo 18'; Berisha (yellow card) 41'; Roshi (yellow card) 68' (goal) 87'; Mbengue (yellow card) 76'; Semyonov (yellow card) 81'; Shvets (yellow card) 86'	Stadium: Anzhi Arena; Attendance: 10,990; Referee: Evgeny Turbin

13 May 2018 30	Amkar Perm	0 – 0	Akhmat Grozny	Perm
14:00 MSK (UTC+3)	Kostyukov (yellow card) 82'; Bodul (yellow card) 84'	Report	Ángel (yellow card) 50' (yellow-red card)	Stadium: Zvezda Stadium; Referee: Aleksei Nikolaev

==== League table ====
Pos	Team	Pld	W	D	L	GF	GA	GD	Pts
7	Arsenal Tula	30	12	6	12	35	41	−6	42
8	Dynamo Moscow	30	10	10	10	29	30	−1	40
9	Akhmat Grozny	30	10	9	11	30	34	−4	39
10	Rubin Kazan	30	9	11	10	32	25	+7	38
11	Rostov	30	9	10	11	27	28	−1	37 (Note: Head-to-head: Rostov 1–0 Ural, Ural 1–1 Rostov)

Updated to match(es) played on 13 May 2018. Source: Russian Premier League, Soccerway
Rules for classification: 1) Points; 2) Head-to-head points; 3) Head-to-head matches won; 4) Head-to-head goal difference; 5) Head-to-head goals scored; 6) Head-to-head away goals; 7) Matches won; 8) Goal difference; 9) Goals scored; 10) Away goals scored.

=== Russian Cup ===
21 September 2017 Round of 32	Yenisey Krasnoyarsk	3 – 0	Akhmat Grozny	Central Stadium
15:00 MSK (UTC+3)	Serderov (yellow card) 29'; Chicherin 35'; Kutyin 52'; Isayev 71'	Report		Stadium: Krasnoyarsk; Referee: Stanislav Vasilyev

== Squad statistics ==
As of match played 13 May 2018

=== Appearances and goals ===
No.	Pos	Nat	Player	Total		Premier League		Russian Cup	
No.	Pos	Nat	Player	Apps	Goals	Apps	Goals	Apps	Goals
2	DF	(Brazil) BRA	Rodolfo	23	3	18+4	3	1	0
3	DF	(Russia) RUS	Zaurbek Pliyev	12	0	9+3	0	0	0
4	DF	(Venezuela) VEN	Wilker Ángel	27	3	26	3	1	0
8	FW	(Brazil) BRA	Léo Jabá	25	3	17+7	3	0+1	0
9	FW	(Russia) RUS	Zaur Sadayev	17	3	8+8	3	1	0
10	MF	(Russia) RUS	Khalid Kadyrov	2	0	0+2	0	0	0
11	MF	(Brazil) BRA	Ismael	25	3	22+2	3	1	0
13	DF	(Iran) IRI	Milad Mohammadi	24	0	21+2	0	1	0
14	MF	(Brazil) BRA	Ravanelli	13	1	2+10	1	1	0
15	DF	(Russia) RUS	Andrei Semyonov	29	0	27+1	0	1	0
16	GK	(Russia) RUS	Yevgeni Gorodov	21	0	20	0	1	0
17	FW	(Senegal) SEN	Ablaye Mbengue	18	2	7+10	2	1	0
18	FW	(Albania) ALB	Bekim Balaj	13	0	7+6	0	0	0
19	MF	(Russia) RUS	Oleg Ivanov	19	0	16+3	0	0	0
21	MF	(Albania) ALB	Odise Roshi	21	1	13+7	1	0+1	0
23	MF	(Russia) RUS	Anton Shvets	26	3	24+1	3	1	0
24	MF	(Russia) RUS	Roland Gigolayev	1	0	1	0	0	0
33	GK	(Russia) RUS	Vitali Gudiyev	11	0	11	0	0	0
40	DF	(Russia) RUS	Rizvan Utsiyev	27	0	27	0	0	0
70	MF	(Russia) RUS	Ayub Batsuyev	6	0	1+5	0	0	0
77	MF	(Kosovo) KOS	Bernard Berisha	23	1	13+10	1	0	0
93	FW	(Russia) RUS	Apti Akhyadov	3	0	2+1	0	0	0
94	DF	(Brazil) BRA	Philipe Sampaio	15	1	15	1	0	0
95	FW	(Russia) RUS	Magomed Mitrishev	30	5	24+5	5	1	0
Players away from the club on loan:
Players who left Akhmat Grozny during the season:

=== Goal scorers ===
Place	Position	Nation	Number	Name	Premier League	Russian Cup	Total
1	FW	(Russia)	95	Magomed Mitrishev	5	0	5
2	FW	(Russia)	9	Zaur Sadayev	3	0	3
2	DF	(Venezuela)	4	Wilker Ángel	3	0	3
2	FW	(Brazil)	8	Léo Jabá	3	0	3
2	MF	(Russia)	23	Anton Shvets	3	0	3
2	MF	(Brazil)	11	Ismael	3	0	3
2	DF	(Brazil)	2	Rodolfo	3	0	3
8	FW	(Senegal)	17	Ablaye Mbengue	2	0	2
9	MF	(Brazil)	14	Ravanelli	1	0	1
9	DF	(Brazil)	94	Philipe Sampaio	1	0	1
9	MF	(Kosovo)	77	Bernard Berisha	1	0	1
9	MF	(Albania)	21	Odise Roshi	1	0	1
9				Own goal	1	0	1
				TOTALS	30	0	30

=== Disciplinary record ===
Number	Nation	Position	Name	Premier League		Russian Cup		Total	
Number	Nation	Position	Name	Yellow card	Red card	Yellow card	Red card	Yellow card	Red card
2	(Brazil)	DF	Rodolfo	5	1	0	0	5	1
3	(Russia)	DF	Zaurbek Pliyev	3	0	0	0	3	0
4	(Venezuela)	DF	Wilker Ángel	8	1	0	0	8	1
8	(Brazil)	FW	Léo Jabá	3	0	0	0	3	0
9	(Russia)	FW	Zaur Sadayev	1	0	0	0	1	0
10	(Russia)	MF	Khalid Kadyrov	1	0	0	0	1	0
11	(Brazil)	MF	Ismael	3	0	0	0	3	0
13	(Iran)	DF	Milad Mohammadi	1	0	0	0	1	0
14	(Brazil)	MF	Ravanelli	2	0	0	0	2	0
15	(Russia)	DF	Andrei Semyonov	6	0	0	0	6	0
16	(Russia)	GK	Yevgeni Gorodov	2	0	0	0	2	0
17	(Senegal)	FW	Ablaye Mbengue	3	0	0	0	3	0
19	(Russia)	MF	Oleg Ivanov	4	0	0	0	4	0
21	(Albania)	MF	Odise Roshi	4	0	0	0	4	0
23	(Russia)	MF	Anton Shvets	8	1	0	0	8	1
33	(Russia)	GK	Vitali Gudiyev	1	0	0	0	1	0
40	(Russia)	DF	Rizvan Utsiyev	7	1	0	0	7	1
77	(Kosovo)	MF	Bernard Berisha	5	0	0	0	5	0
93	(Russia)	FW	Apti Akhyadov	1	0	0	0	1	0
94	(Brazil)	DF	Philipe Sampaio	3	0	0	0	3	0
			TOTALS	71	4	0	0	71	4
