= Ablaye Mbengue =

Senegalese footballer (born 1992)

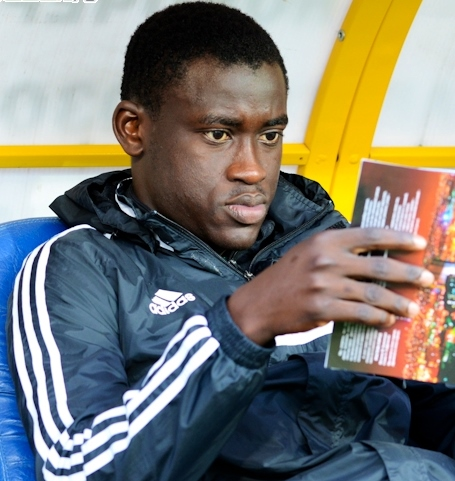

Personal information
- Full name: Vieux Ablaye Mbengue
- Date of birth: 19 May 1992 (age 34)
- Place of birth: Dakar, Senegal
- Height: 1.87 m (6 ft 2 in)
- Position: Forward

Team information
- Current team: Al-Qadsia
- Number: 91

Senior career*
Years	Team	Apps	(Gls)
–2013	ASC Jaraaf		
2013–2015	Sapins	14	(15)
2015–2021	Akhmat Grozny	106	(22)
2021	→ Dinamo Minsk (loan)	15	(10)
2022	Al-Arabi Kuwait	11	(10)
2022–2025	Al-Arabi Unaizah	71	(49)
2025–2026	Al Wehda	13	(6)
2026–	Al-Qadsia	3	(3)
- * Club domestic league appearances and goals as of 15 January 2026

Vieux Ablaye Mbengue (born 19 May 1992) is a Senegalese professional footballer who plays as a striker for Kuwaiti club Al-Qadsia.

== Career ==
Mbengue began his career at ASC Jaraaf before joining Sapins. In January 2015, Mbengue went on trial with Turkish First League side Adana Demirspor. On 24 February 2015, Mbengue signed for Russian Premier League side FC Terek Grozny. Mbengue made his professional debut on 2 May 2015 for Terek Grozny in their Russian Premier League game against FC Rostov, coming in as a substitute shortly before half-time for the injured Aílton. With 7 minutes left in the game, he scored the only goal of the match, giving his team a 1–0 away victory. In his first game in the starting lineup on 11 May 2015, he scored twice to help Terek beat FC Spartak Moscow with a score of 4–2.

On 27 May 2019 Mbengue signed a new three-year contract with Akhmat Grozny, keeping him in Grozny until the summer of 2022. In August 2020, Mbengue went AWOL from Akhmat Grozny.

On 29 March 2021, Mbengue joined Dinamo Minsk on loan until the end of the 2021 season from Akhmat Grozny.

On 5 October 2021, Dinamo Minsk announced that Mbengue had unilaterally terminated his loan deal with Dinamo Minsk, and contract with Akhmat Grozny, to join Maccabi Petah Tikva.

On 16 June 2022, Mbengue joined Saudi Arabian club Al-Arabi Unaizah. In September 2025, Mbengue joined Al Wehda.

== Career statistics ==
As of match played 28 March 2024

Appearances and goals by club, season and competition
Club	Season	League			National Cup		Continental		Other		Total	
Club	Season	Division	Apps	Goals	Apps	Goals	Apps	Goals	Apps	Goals	Apps	Goals
Akhmat Grozny	2014–15	RPL	5	4	0	0	-		-		5	4
Akhmat Grozny	2015–16	RPL	21	3	1	0	-		-		22	3
Akhmat Grozny	2016–17	RPL	22	7	1	0	-		-		23	7
Akhmat Grozny	2017–18	RPL	17	2	1	0	-		-		18	2
Akhmat Grozny	2018–19	RPL	25	5	1	0	-		-		26	5
Akhmat Grozny	2019–20	RPL	16	1	2	1	-		-		18	2
Akhmat Grozny	2020–21	RPL	0	0	0	0	-		-		0	0
Akhmat Grozny	Total		106	22	6	1	-	-	-	-	112	23
Dinamo Minsk (loan)	2021	BPL	15	10	0	0	-		-		15	10
Al-Arabi	2021–22	KPL	11	10	0	0	3	3	2	2	16	15
Al-Arabi	2022–23	SFDL	32	29	0	0	—		—		33	29
Al-Arabi	2023–24	SFDL	21	14	0	0	-		-		21	14
Al-Arabi	2024–25	SFDL	16	6	0	0	-		-		16	6
Al Wehda	2025–26	SFDL	12	5	0	0	-		-		12	5
Total			107	74	0	0	-	-	-	-	107	74
Career total			213	96	6	1	3	3	2	2	225	102

== Honours ==
- Gabon Championnat National D1 top scorer: 2013–14
