= Rodolfo (footballer, born 1982) =

Brazilian footballer and coach

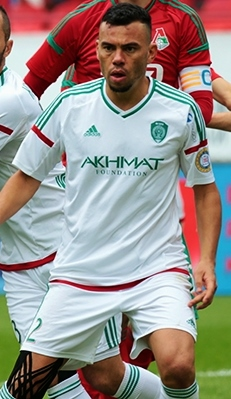
- Rodolfo with Terek in 2015

Personal information
- Full name: Rodolfo Dantas Bispo
- Date of birth: 23 October 1982 (age 44)
- Place of birth: Santos, Brazil
- Height: 1.84 m (6 ft 1/2 in)
- Positions: Centre back; midfielder

Team information
- Current team: Akhmat Grozny (coach)

Youth career
- 2000–2002: Fluminense

Senior career*
Years	Team	Apps	(Gls)
2002–2004	Fluminense	65	(8)
2004–2006	Dynamo Kyiv	56	(7)
2007–2011	Lokomotiv Moscow	83	(8)
2011	→ Grêmio (loan)	14	(1)
2012–2014	Vasco da Gama	20	(1)
2015–2019	Akhmat Grozny	82	(5)
Total		320	(30)

International career
2004	Brazil U23	1	(0)

Managerial career
- 2019–: Akhmat Grozny (assistant)
- * Club domestic league appearances and goals

Rodolfo Dantas Bispo (born 23 October 1982) is a Brazilian football coach and a former player who played center-back or central midfielder. He is an assistant coach with the Russian club FC Akhmat Grozny.

== Career ==
=== Club ===
Rodolfo joined Fluminense of Rio de Janeiro, a traditional rival state in football. While at Fluminense, he played against future teammate Kléber at Copa Sudamericana.

Rodolfo joined Dynamo Kyiv in July 2004.

Rodolfo joined Lokomotiv Moscow in January 2007. After Bilyaletdinov's departure to Everton, Rodolfo took his role and was appointed Lokomotiv's new captain.

On 6 March 2015, Rodolfo joined FC Terek Grozny.

On 27 May 2019, FC Akhmat Grozny announced the retirement of Rodolfo as a player and that he will join club's coaching staff.

=== International ===
Rodolfo is capped for Brazil in 2004 CONMEBOL Men Pre-Olympic Tournament.

== Style of play ==
Rodolfo's style of play resembles that of his hero, Brazil captain Lucio. As with Lucio style, Rodolfo also contributes in attack by frequently making long runs into the opponent's half using his technique and speed to full effect. Rodolfo is not shy in front of the net and has scored many important goals for Lokomotiv. He also possesses a good long shot.

== Career statistics ==
=== Club ===
As of 13 May 2018

Club	Season	League			Cup		Continental		Other		Total	
Club	Season	Division	Apps	Goals	Apps	Goals	Apps	Goals	Apps	Goals	Apps	Goals
Fluminense	2002	Série A	2	0	0	0	–		–		2	0
Fluminense	2003	Série A	38	5	0	0	4	1	–		42	6
Fluminense	2004	Série A	25	3	0	0	–		–		25	3
Fluminense	Total		65	8	0	0	4	1	0	0	69	9
Dynamo Kyiv	2004–05	Vyshcha Liha	22	3	4	1	8	0	–		34	4
Dynamo Kyiv	2005–06	Vyshcha Liha	25	3	4	0	2	0	–		31	3
Dynamo Kyiv	2006–07	Vyshcha Liha	9	1	0	0	5	0	1 (Note: One appearance in the Ukrainian Super Cup)	0	15	1
Dynamo Kyiv	Total		56	7	8	1	15	0	1	0	80	8
Lokomotiv Moscow	2007	Russian Premier League	17	3	6	0	4	0	–		27	3
Lokomotiv Moscow	2008	Russian Premier League	26	0	0	0	–		1 (Note: One appearance in the Russian Super Cup)	1	27	1
Lokomotiv Moscow	2009	Russian Premier League	24	3	1	0	–		–		25	3
Lokomotiv Moscow	2010	Russian Premier League	16	2	0	0	2	0	–		18	2
Lokomotiv Moscow	Total		83	8	7	0	6	0	1	1	97	9
Grêmio	2011	Série A	1	0	0	0	7	0	13 (Note: Thirteen appearances in the Campeonato Gaúcho)	1	21	1
Vasco da Gama	2012	Série A	8	1	0	0	9	0	12 (Note: Thirteen appearances in the Campeonato Gaúcho)	0	29	1
Akhmat Grozny	2014–15	Russian Premier League	6	0	–		–		–		6	0
Akhmat Grozny	2015–16	Russian Premier League	26	0	1	0	–		–		27	0
Akhmat Grozny	2016–17	Russian Premier League	17	1	1	0	–		–		18	1
Akhmat Grozny	2017–18	Russian Premier League	22	3	1	0	–		–		23	3
Akhmat Grozny	2018–19	Russian Premier League	11	1	0	0	–		–		11	1
Akhmat Grozny	Total		82	5	3	0	0	0	0	0	85	5
Career Total			295	29	18	1	41	1	27	2	381	33

== Honours ==
Fluminense

- Campeonato Carioca: 2002

Dynamo Kyiv

- Ukrainian Cup (2): 2004–05, 2005–06
- Ukrainian Super Cup (2): 2005, 2006

Lokomotiv Moscow

- Russian Cup (1): 2006–07
