= Wilker Ángel =

Venezuelan footballer (born 1993)

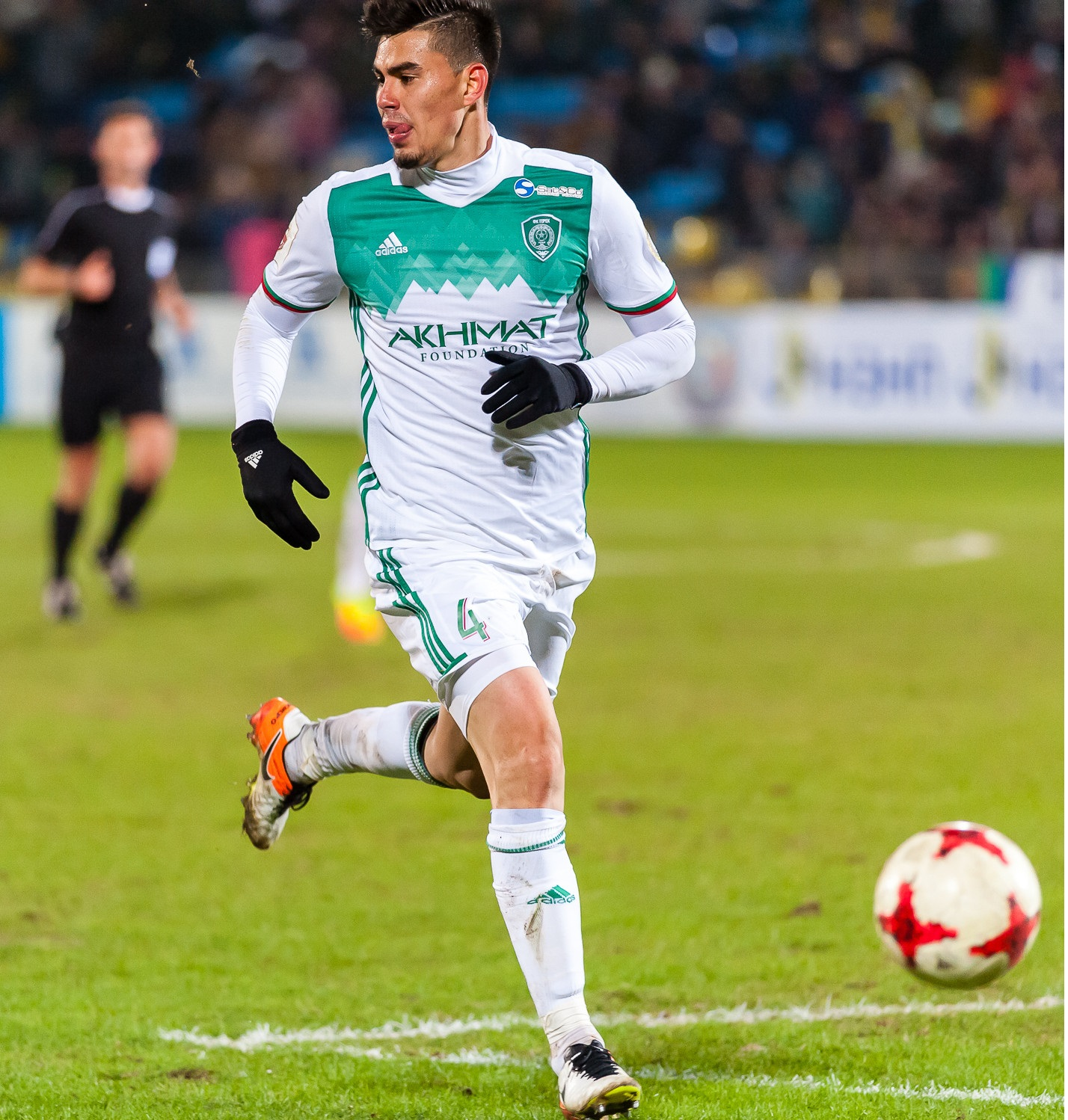
- Ángel with FC Terek in 2017

Personal information
- Full name: Wilker José Ángel Romero
- Date of birth: 18 March 1993 (age 33)
- Place of birth: Valera, Venezuela
- Height: 1.90 m (6 ft 3 in)
- Position: Defender

Senior career*
Years	Team	Apps	(Gls)
2009–2011	Trujillanos	13	(0)
2011–2016	Deportivo Táchira	148	(18)
2016–2021	Akhmat Grozny	105	(7)
2021–2022	Göztepe	15	(0)
2023	Aucas	11	(0)
2024	Criciúma	19	(1)
2025	Juventude	18	(1)

International career^{‡}
2011	Venezuela U20	4	(0)
2014–	Venezuela	46	(2)
- * Club domestic league appearances and goals as of 15 December 2025 ‡ National team caps and goals as of 23:23, 9 September 2025 (AEST)

Wilker José Ángel Romero (born 18 March 1993) is a Venezuelan professional footballer.

== Club career ==
=== Trujillanos ===
Before he was 18, Ángel won the Primera División with Trujillanos FC in the 2010–2011 season,

=== Deportivo Táchira ===
Ángel moved to Deportivo Táchira in 2011 and scored his first goal against Caroni in a match they lost 2–1 on 5 March 2011, his second came 11 days later against Estudiantes de Mérida winning the match 3–1, his third goal came against Zulia FC on 20 May 2012, his team won 5–0.

=== Terek Grozny ===
On 1 August 2016, Ángel signed for Russian Premier League side Akhmat Grozny, then called Terek Grozny. On 17 May 2021, Akhmat Grozny announced that Ángel had left the club after 121 games for the club.

=== Göztepe ===
On 8 September 2021, he signed a one-year contract with one-year option with the Turkish club Göztepe.

== International career ==
Ángel was called up to the full Venezuela squad for the 2014 FIFA World Cup qualifiers, but was not included. On 18 November 2014, he made his debut in a friendly against Bolivia, where he scored the opening goal of the match. However, despite this, Venezuela lost 2–3.

== Career statistics ==
=== Club ===
As of match played 29 August 2025

Club	Season	League			State league		National Cup		Continental		Other		Total	
Club	Season	Division	Apps	Goals	Apps	Goals	Apps	Goals	Apps	Goals	Apps	Goals	Apps	Goals
Deportivo Táchira	2010-11	Liga Venezolana	8	2	–		1	0	1 (Note: Appearance(s) in Copa Libertadores)	0	–		10	2
Deportivo Táchira	2011-12	Liga Venezolana	22	2	–		6	0	6	0	–		34	2
Deportivo Táchira	2012-13	Liga Venezolana	23	2	–		–		1 (Note: Appearance(s) in Copa Sudamericana)	0	–		24	2
Deportivo Táchira	2013-14	Liga Venezolana	32	6	–		–		–		–		32	6
Deportivo Táchira	2014-15	Liga Venezolana	35	4	–		–		–		–		35	4
Deportivo Táchira	2015	Liga Venezolana	14	0	–		2	1	7	0	–		23	1
Deportivo Táchira	2016	Liga Venezolana	14	2	–		0	0	8	1	–		22	3
Deportivo Táchira	Total		148	18	–		9	1	23	1	0	0	180	20
Akhmat Grozny	2016–17	Russian Premier League	26	1	–		2	0	–		–		28	1
Akhmat Grozny	2017–18	Russian Premier League	26	3	–		1	0	–		–		27	3
Akhmat Grozny	2018–19	Russian Premier League	18	1	–		1	0	–		–		19	1
Akhmat Grozny	2019–20	Russian Premier League	19	1	–		3	1	–		–		22	2
Akhmat Grozny	2020–21	Russian Premier League	16	1	–		5	0	–		–		21	1
Akhmat Grozny	Total		105	7	–		12	1	–		–		117	8
Göztepe	2022–23	Süper Lig	15	0	–		2	0	–		–		17	0
Aucas	2023	Ecuadorian Serie A	11	0	–		0	0	4	0	–		15	0
Criciúma	2024	Série A	12	0	6	1	4	0	–		–		22	1
Juventude	2025	Série A	14	1	3	0	0	0	–		–		17	1
Career total			405	26	9	1	27	2	27	1	0	0	68	30

=== International ===
As of 9 September 2025

Venezuela national team
Year	Apps	Goals
2014	1	1
2015	1	0
2016	11	1
2017	4	0
2018	4	0
2019	2	0
2020	4	0
2021	1	0
2023	7	0
2024	6	0
2025	5	0
Total	46	2

Statistics accurate as of match played 03 June 2021

=== International goals ===
As of match played 2 February 2016

#	Date	Venue	Opponent	Score	Result	Competition	Ref
1.	18 November 2014	Estadio Hernando Siles, La Paz, Bolivia	Bolivia	1–0	2–3	Friendly	
2.	2 February 2016	Estadio Agustín Tovar, Barinas, Venezuela	Costa Rica	1–0	1–0	Friendly	

== Honors ==
Venezuela

- Kirin Cup: 2019
