= Milad Mohammadi =

Iranian footballer

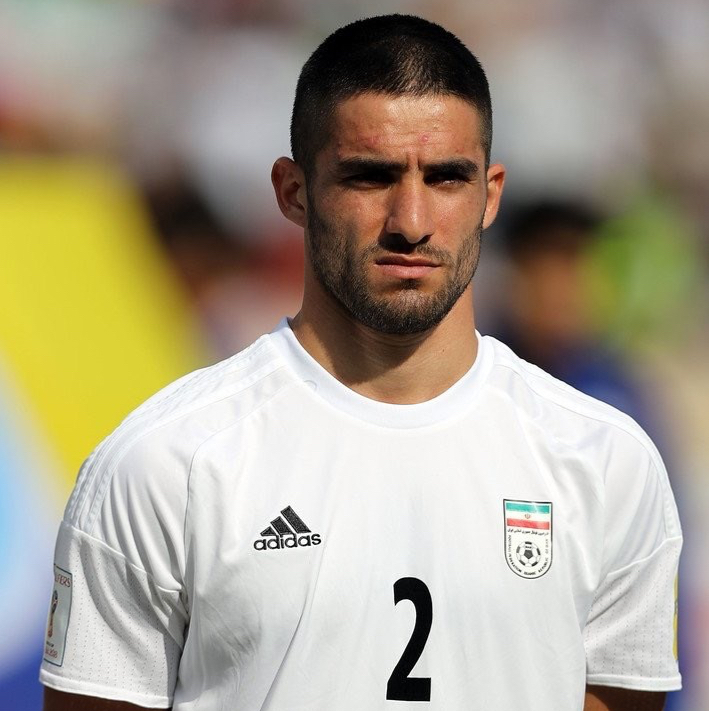
- Mohammadi in 2018

Personal information
- Full name: Milad Mohammadi Keshmarzi
- Date of birth: 29 September 1993 (age 33)
- Place of birth: Tehran, Iran
- Height: 1.75 m (5 ft 9 in)
- Positions: Left-back; wing-back

Team information
- Current team: Maxline Vitebsk
- Number: 5

Youth career
- 2007–2008: Persepolis
- 2008–2012: Damash Tehran
- 2012–2014: Nirooye Zamini

Senior career*
Years	Team	Apps	(Gls)
2014–2016	Rah Ahan	44	(0)
2016–2019	Akhmat Grozny	78	(3)
2019–2021	Gent	47	(2)
2021–2024	AEK Athens	48	(1)
2024	Adana Demirspor	15	(0)
2024–2026	Persepolis	46	(0)
2026–	Maxline Vitebsk	0	(0)

International career^{‡}
2015–2016	Iran U23	15	(3)
2015–	Iran	79	(1)
- * Club domestic league appearances and goals as of 8 February 2026 ‡ National team caps and goals as of 27 June 2026

Milad Mohammadi Keshmarzi, known as Milad Mohammadi (Persian: ميلاد محمدی کشمرزی; born 29 September 1993) is an Iranian professional footballer who plays for Belarusian Premier League club Maxline Vitebsk and the Iran national team.

Known for his speed and versatility, Milad plays as a left back and winger. His twin brother Mehrdad plays for Foolad in the Persian Gulf Pro League.

== Club career ==
=== Rah Ahan ===
Milad Mohammadi joined Rah Ahan in the summer of 2014 with a five–year contract and made his debut for them in the first fixture of the 2014–15 Iran Pro League against Esteghlal.

In July 2015 Mohammadi went on trial with Austrian Bundesliga club Sturm Graz. He reportedly had two offers from European sides but Rah Ahan coach Farhad Kazemi refused to let him leave the club.

=== Akhmat Grozny ===
On 6 February 2016 Mohammadi signed a contract with Russian Premier League club Terek Grozny until 2019. Milad made his debut for Terek Grozny as a substitute on 2 April 2016 in a 3–2 win over Anzhi Makhachkala. Mohammadi scored his first goal for Terek and his first ever professional league goal on 29 April 2017 in a 5–2 victory against Ural Yekaterinburg. After the 2016–17 season, he was named as one of the top 50 U23 Asian talents to watch for.

On 27 May 2019, Akhmat confirmed that Mohammadi left the club as a free agent upon the expiration of his contract.

=== Gent ===
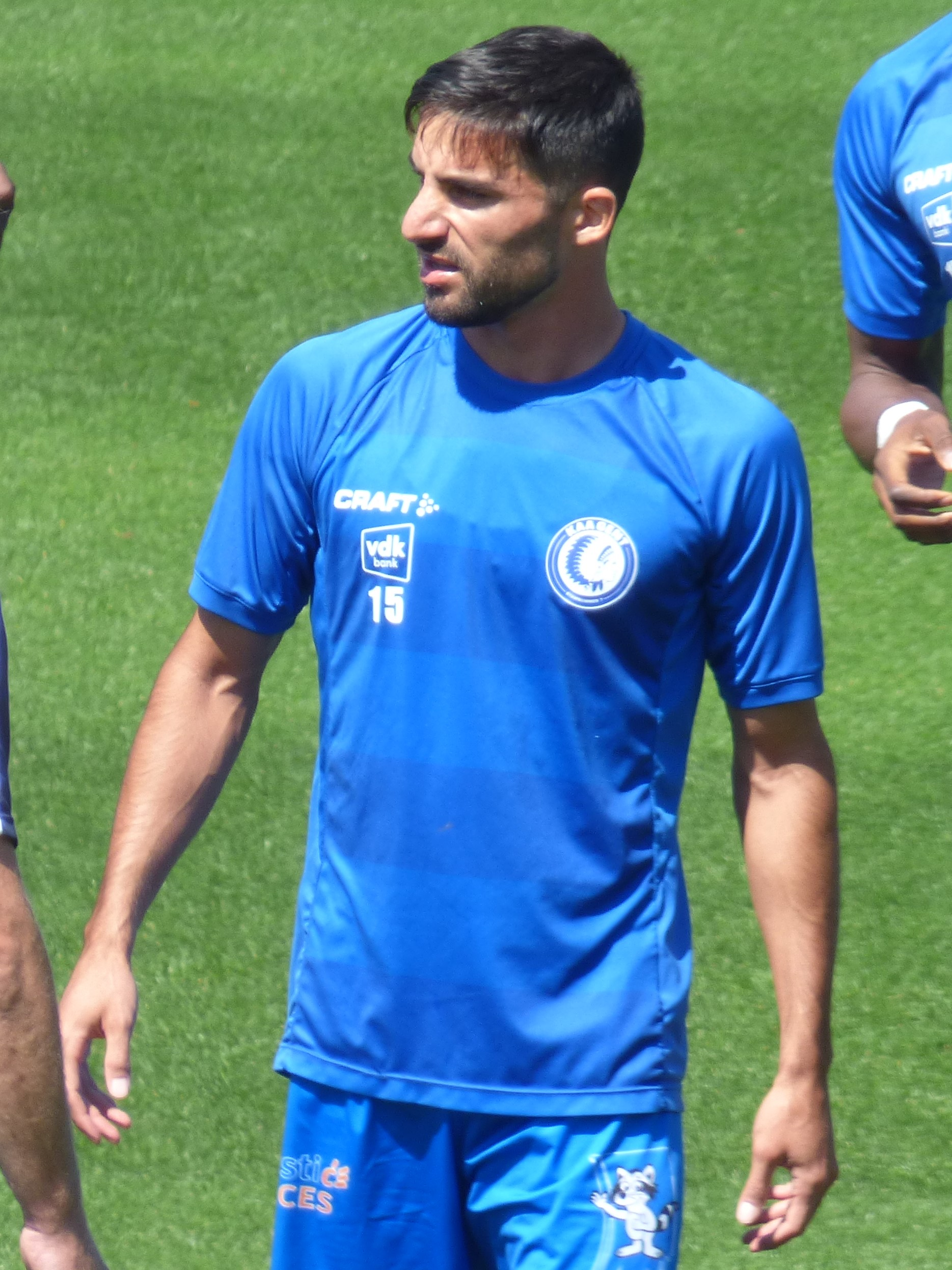
Mohammadi playing for Gent in 2020

In July 2019 Mohammadi signed with Belgian club Gent.

He was one of the key players of the team in many matches and had an acceptable defensive performance. Although he was effective in attack and was able to help the team with scoring important goals.

=== AEK Athens ===
On 17 September 2021, Mohammadi signed a three-year contract with Super League Greece side AEK Athens after getting released from Gent on 25 August.

=== Adana Demirspor ===
On January 26, 2024, Iranian international footballer Milad Mohammadi completed a transfer to Turkish club Adana Demirspor. The signing of the 2.5-year contract was announced by the club, solidifying Mohammadi's commitment to Adana Demirspor until the summer of 2026. The transfer was reported by various sports news outlets, including Footballi.

The move came as part of Adana Demirspor's efforts to strengthen their squad for the upcoming seasons. Mohammadi's experience as a left-back and winger, coupled with his international experience with the Iranian national team, was seen as a valuable addition to the team's lineup. He left the club on 19 August 2024.

=== Persepolis ===
On 20 August 2024, Mohammadi joined Persian Gulf Pro League side Persepolis on a two-year deal.

== International career ==
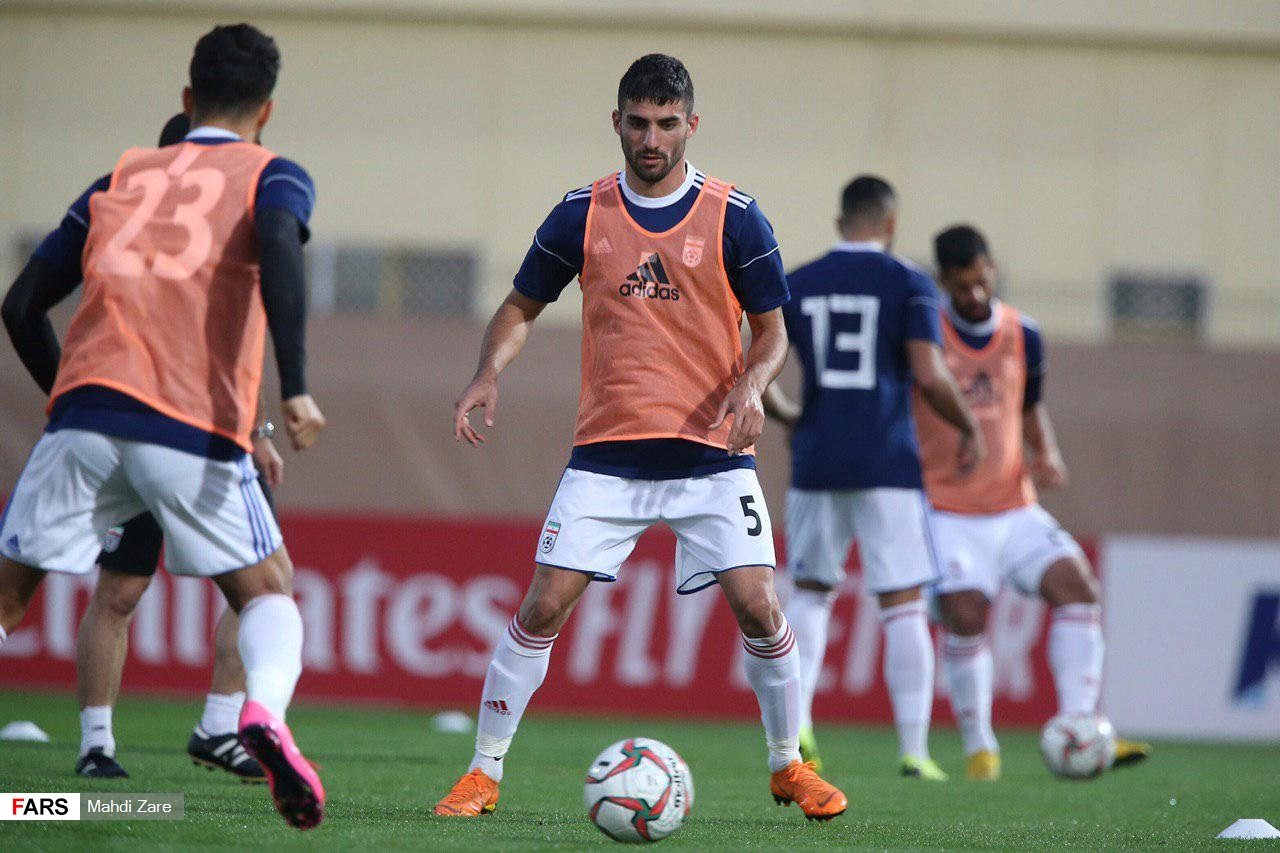
Mohammadi in Iran training at the 2019 AFC Asian Cup

Mohammadi scored a goal during the 2016 AFC U-23 Championship.

Carlos Queiroz invited Mohammadi to a national team camp in June 2015. He made his debut against Uzbekistan in a friendly match on 11 June 2015 and was on the bench on 16 June 2015 in a World Cup qualifier against Turkmenistan.

He was named in Iran's squad for the 2018 FIFA World Cup in Russia, where he came to prominence when he tried and failed at an extravagant throw-in, in the 93rd minute while Iran were trailing 1–0 to Spain.

On 1 June 2026, he was named in the 26-man squad for the 2026 FIFA World Cup.

== Personal life ==
Mohammadi was born in the Fallah district of southern Tehran. He is of Persian and Iranian Azerbaijani descent, with family roots tracing back to the village of Kashmarz in the Qazvin Province. Due to his pace, Iranian football fans nicknamed him 'Mig-Mig,' the Persian name for the Road Runner cartoon character. He is the twin brother of Mehrdad Mohammadi.

== Career statistics ==
=== Club ===
As of match played 8 February 2026

Appearances and goals by club, season and competition
Club	Season	League			National Cup		Continental		Other		Total	
Club	Season	Division	Apps	Goals	Apps	Goals	Apps	Goals	Apps	Goals	Apps	Goals
Rah Ahan	2014–15	Persian Gulf Pro League	27	0	1	1	—		—		28	1
Rah Ahan	2015–16	Persian Gulf Pro League	17	0	2	0	—		—		19	0
Rah Ahan	Total		44	0	3	1	—		—		47	1
Akhmat Grozny	2015–16	Russian Premier League	3	0	0	0	—		—		3	0
Akhmat Grozny	2016–17	Russian Premier League	24	2	1	0	—		—		25	2
Akhmat Grozny	2017–18	Russian Premier League	23	0	1	0	—		—		24	0
Akhmat Grozny	2018–19	Russian Premier League	28	1	2	0	—		—		30	1
Akhmat Grozny	Total		78	3	4	0	—		—		82	3
Gent	2019–20	Belgian First Division A	18	1	2	0	4	0	—		24	1
Gent	2020–21	Belgian First Division A	29	1	3	0	6	0	3	0	41	1
Gent	Total		47	2	5	0	10	0	3	0	65	2
AEK Athens	2021–22	Super League Greece	25	0	3	0	—		—		28	0
AEK Athens	2022–23	Super League Greece	13	0	1	0	—		—		14	0
AEK Athens	2023–24	Super League Greece	10	1	0	0	4	0	—		14	1
AEK Athens	Total		48	1	4	0	4	0	0	0	56	1
Adana Demirspor	2023–24	Süper Lig	13	0	0	0	0	0	–		13	0
Adana Demirspor	2024–25	Süper Lig	2	0	0	0	0	0	–		2	0
Adana Demirspor	Total		15	0	0	0	0	0	–		15	0
Persepolis	2024–25	Pro League	26	0	1	0	8	0	1	0	36	0
Persepolis	2025–26	Pro League	20	0	1	0	–		–		21	0
Persepolis	Total		46	0	2	0	8	0	1	0	57	0
Career total			278	6	18	1	22	0	4	0	322	7

=== International ===
Statistics accurate as of match played 27 June 2026

Iran
Year	Apps	Goals
2015	2	0
2016	6	0
2017	6	0
2018	10	0
2019	10	0
2020	2	0
2021	7	1
2022	5	0
2023	4	0
2024	15	0
2025	6	0
2026	6	0
Total	79	1

List of international goals scored by Milad Mohammadi
No.	Date	Venue	Opponent	Score	Result	Competition
1.	11 June 2021	Bahrain National Stadium, Riffa, Bahrain	Cambodia	5–0	10–0	2022 FIFA World Cup qualification

== Honours ==
AEK Athens

- Super League Greece: 2022–23
- Greek Cup: 2022–23
