= Kazemır Qudiyev =

Azerbaijani footballer and coach

Personal information
- Date of birth: 29 April 1972 (age 54)
- Height: 1.90 m (6 ft 3 in)
- Position: Goalkeeper

Senior career*
Years	Team	Apps	(Gls)
1990–1991	FC Avtodor Vladikavkaz	8	(0)
1993	FC Iriston Vladikavkaz	36	(0)
1994	FC Spartak Vladikavkaz	0	(0)
1994–1995	FC Iriston Vladikavkaz	40	(0)
1996–1998	FC Zhemchuzhina-Sochi	8	(0)
1998	FC Kuban Krasnodar	5	(0)
2000	FC Alania Vladikavkaz	0	(0)
2001	FC Avtodor Vladikavkaz	0	(0)
2001–2002	FC Terek Grozny	9	(0)
2003–2004	FC Severstal Cherepovets	17	(0)

International career
1996–1997	Azerbaijan	3	(0)

Managerial career
- 2006: FC Spartak-2 Vladikavkaz (assistant)
- 2008: FC Alania-2 Vladikavkaz (assistant)
- 2020–2021: Alania Vladikavkaz (GK coach)
- * Club domestic league appearances and goals

Kazemır Qudiyev (Russian: Казимир Витальевич Гудиев; born 29 April 1972) is an Azerbaijani professional football coach and a former player. He also holds Russian citizenship.

== Club career ==
He made his professional debut in the Soviet Second League B in 1990 for FC Avtodor Vladikavkaz.

== Personal life ==
He is the father of the Russian footballer Vitali Gudiyev.
