= AWOL (disambiguation) =

AWOL means "absent without leave".

AWOL may also refer to:

== Arts and entertainment ==
=== Film and television ===
- Absent Without Leave (film), a 1992 New Zealand film
- AWOL (2016 film), a 2016 romantic drama, based on a 2010 short film of the same name
- AWOL (2017 film), a 2017 Philippine action thriller
- "A.W.O.L." (Arrow), an episode of the American TV series
- Lionheart (1990 film), also known as AWOL
- AWOL (TV series), a 1998 anime by Isamu Imakake

=== Music ===
- A.W.O.L. (album), by AZ, 2005
- "A.W.O.L.", a section of "B-Boy Bouillabaisse" by the Beastie Boys from the 1989 album Paul's Boutique
- "A.W.O.L.", a song by Exodus from the 1990 album Impact Is Imminent
- "A.W.O.L.", a song by Yellowcard from the 2001 album One for the Kids
- "AWOL", a song by Jethro Tull from the 1999 album J-Tull Dot Com
- AWOL (rapper), from the gangsta rap group Bloods & Crips

=== Other uses in arts and entertainment ===
- Albert Awol, a fictional boat captain in Jungle Cruise

== People ==
- Mohammed Awol (born 1978), Ethiopian athlete
- Awol Erizku (born 1988), an Ethiopian–American contemporary artist

== Other uses ==
- Alcohol without liquid, a method of administering alcohol

== See also ==
- Absenteeism, a habitual pattern of absence from a duty or obligation without good reason
- Awolnation, an American rock band
