= Magomed Mitrishev =

Russian footballer

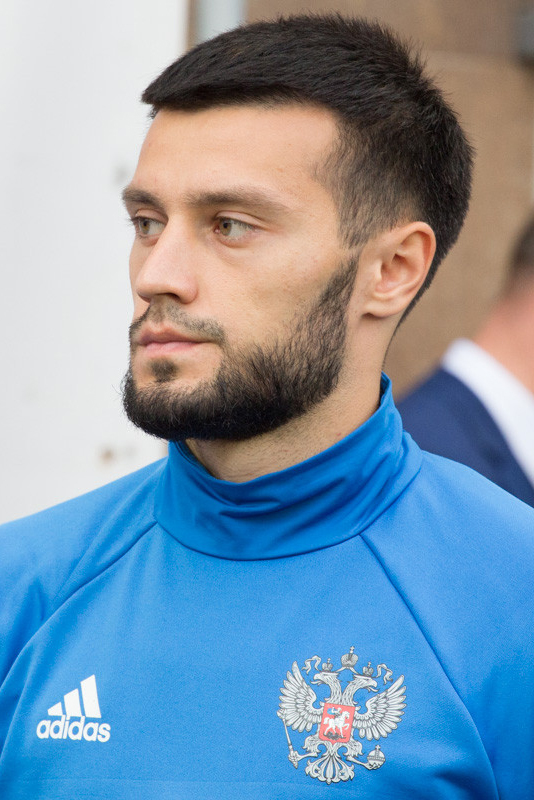
- Mitrishev with Russia in 2017

Personal information
- Full name: Magomed Abuyazidovich Mitrishev
- Date of birth: 10 September 1992 (age 34)
- Place of birth: Grozny, Russia
- Height: 1.77 m (5 ft 10 in)
- Position: Forward

Youth career
- Spartak Nalchik

Senior career*
Years	Team	Apps	(Gls)
2010–2012	Spartak Nalchik	17	(6)
2012–2021	Akhmat Grozny	119	(16)
2014–2015	→ Anzhi Makhachkala (loan)	14	(2)
2020–2021	→ Chayka Peschanokopskoye (loan)	2	(0)
2021–2022	Veles Moscow	10	(0)

International career
2011	Russia U-19	5	(2)
2012–2013	Russia U-21	9	(3)
- * Club domestic league appearances and goals

Magomed Abuyazidovich Mitrishev (Russian: Магомед Абуязидович Митришев; born 10 September 1992) is a Russian former professional football player of Chechen origin who played as a forward, attacking midfielder or winger.

== Club career ==
Mitrishev made his professional debut for PFC Spartak Nalchik on 28 November 2010 in a Russian Premier League game against FC Anzhi Makhachkala. He came on as a substitute in the 71st minute and scored a goal a minute later.

On 5 August 2020, Mitrishev joined Chayka Peschanokopskoye on loan for the 2020–21 season.

== Career statistics ==
=== Club ===
As of 13 May 2018

Club	Season	League			Cup		Continental		Total	
Club	Season	Division	Apps	Goals	Apps	Goals	Apps	Goals	Apps	Goals
PFC Spartak Nalchik	2009	Russian Premier League	0	0	0	0	–		0	0
PFC Spartak Nalchik	2010	Russian Premier League	1	1	0	0	–		1	1
PFC Spartak Nalchik	2011–12	Russian Premier League	16	5	1	0	–		17	5
PFC Spartak Nalchik	Total		17	6	1	0	0	0	18	6
FC Akhmat Grozny	2012–13	Russian Premier League	18	2	2	0	–		20	2
FC Akhmat Grozny	2013–14	Russian Premier League	2	0	0	0	–		2	0
FC Anzhi Makhachkala	2014–15	FNL	14	2	0	0	–		14	2
FC Akhmat Grozny	2015–16	Russian Premier League	22	4	2	2	–		24	6
FC Akhmat Grozny	2016–17	Russian Premier League	23	3	2	0	–		25	3
FC Akhmat Grozny	2017–18	Russian Premier League	29	5	1	0	–		30	5
FC Akhmat Grozny	Total (2 spells)		94	14	7	2	0	0	101	16
Career total			125	22	8	2	0	0	133	24
