= Vitali Gudiyev =

Russian footballer

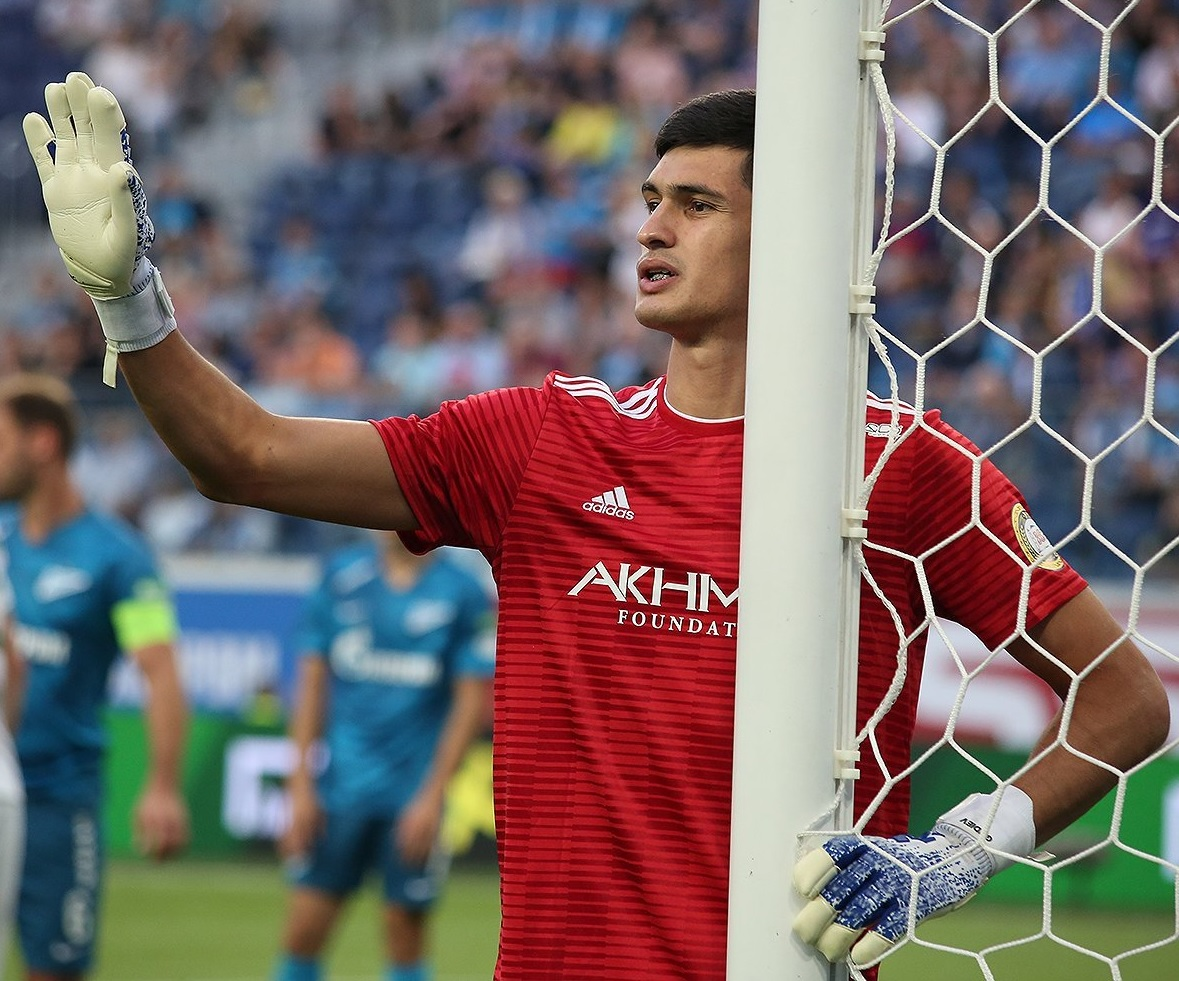
- Gudiyev with Akhmat in 2019

Personal information
- Full name: Vitali Kazimirovich Gudiyev
- Date of birth: 22 April 1995 (age 31)
- Place of birth: Vladikavkaz, Russia
- Height: 1.92 m (6 ft 4 in)
- Position: Goalkeeper

Team information
- Current team: Akron Tolyatti
- Number: 88

Youth career
- Yunost Vladikavkaz
- Konoplyov football academy

Senior career*
Years	Team	Apps	(Gls)
2011–2013	Alania Vladikavkaz	10	(0)
2014–2022	Akhmat Grozny	44	(0)
2015–2016	→ Terek-2 Grozny	4	(0)
2022–2023	Khimki	8	(0)
2023–2025	Fakel Voronezh	24	(0)
2025–	Akron Tolyatti	40	(0)

International career^{‡}
2012	Russia U-17	1	(0)
2015	Russia U-21	1	(0)
- * Club domestic league appearances and goals as of 21 November 2026 ‡ National team caps and goals as of 31 March 2015

Vitali Kazimirovich Gudiyev (Russian: Виталий Казимирович Гудиев; born 22 April 1995) is a Russian professional footballer who plays as a goalkeeper for Akron Tolyatti.

== Club career ==
=== Alania ===
He made his debut in the FNL for Alania Vladikavkaz on 24 June 2011 in a game against Mordovia Saransk.

=== Terek ===
On 15 February 2014, Terek announced signing Gudiyev for four-and-a-half years.

=== Khimki ===
On 14 July 2022, Gudiyev signed a one-year contract with Khimki.

=== Fakel ===
On 26 June 2023, Gudiev signed with Fakel Voronezh. On 28 May 2024, his contract with Fakel was extended.

=== Akron ===
On 23 June 2025, Gudiyev signed a three-year contract with Akron Tolyatti.

== International career ==
Gudiyev was first called up to the Russia national football team in November 2025 for friendlies.

== Personal life ==
He is the son of the Azerbaijani former footballer Kazemır Qudiyev.

== Career statistics ==
As of match played 21 November 2026

Appearances and goals by club, season and competition
Club	Season	League			Cup		Other		Total	
Club	Season	Division	Apps	Goals	Apps	Goals	Apps	Goals	Apps	Goals
Alania Vladikavkaz	2011–12	Russian First League	1	0	1	0	0	0	2	0
Alania Vladikavkaz	2012–13	Russian Premier League	3	0	1	0	—		4	0
Alania Vladikavkaz	2013–14	Russian First League	6	0	2	0	—		8	0
Alania Vladikavkaz	Total		10	0	4	0	—		14	0
Akhmat Grozny	2013–14	Russian Premier League	0	0	0	0	—		0	0
Akhmat Grozny	2014–15	Russian Premier League	0	0	0	0	—		0	0
Akhmat Grozny	2015–16	Russian Premier League	0	0	0	0	—		0	0
Akhmat Grozny	2016–17	Russian Premier League	1	0	0	0	—		1	0
Akhmat Grozny	2017–18	Russian Premier League	10	0	0	0	—		10	0
Akhmat Grozny	2018–19	Russian Premier League	1	0	2	0	—		3	0
Akhmat Grozny	2019–20	Russian Premier League	4	0	0	0	—		4	0
Akhmat Grozny	2020–21	Russian Premier League	14	0	3	0	—		17	0
Akhmat Grozny	2021–22	Russian Premier League	14	0	0	0	—		14	0
Akhmat Grozny	Total		44	0	5	0	—		49	0
Terek-2 Grozny	2015–16	Russian Second League	4	0	—		—		4	0
Khimki	2022–23	Russian Premier League	8	0	3	0	—		11	0
Fakel Voronezh	2023–24	Russian Premier League	6	0	5	0	—		11	0
Fakel Voronezh	2024–25	Russian Premier League	18	0	5	0	—		23	0
Fakel Voronezh	Total		24	0	10	0	—		34	0
Akron Tolyatti	2025–26	Russian Premier League	25	0	0	0	—		25	0
Akron Tolyatti	2026–27	Russian Premier League	15	0	0	0	—		15	0
Akron Tolyatti	Total		40	0	0	0	—		40	0
Career total			130	0	22	0	0	0	152	0
