= 2006 FC Terek Grozny season =

Terek Grozny
2006 season
- Manager: Aleksandr Tarkhanov (until 31 May); Vitaly Shevchenko (1 June-31 August); Vait Talgayev (from 1 September)
- Stadium: Central Stadium
- First Division: 8th
- Russian Cup: Round of 16 vs Zenit St.Petersburg
- Russian Cup: Round of 32 vs Moscow
- Top goalscorer: League: Four Players (5); All: Three Players (6)
Home colours	Away colours

The 2006 Terek Grozny season was the first season that the club played back in the Russian Football National League following their relegation from the Russian Premier League at the end of the 2005 Season.

== Squad ==
As of match played 5 November 2006

No.	Name	Nationality	Position	Date of birth (age)	Signed from	Signed in	Contract ends	Apps.	Goals
Goalkeepers
1	Dmitri Goncharov	(Russia)	GK	15 April 1975 (aged 31)	Kuban Krasnodar	2005		23	0
35	Rizavdi Edilov	(Russia)	GK	26 June 1988 (aged 18)	Youth Team	2005		4	0
	Dmitry Kramarenko	(Azerbaijan)	GK	12 September 1974 (aged 32)	Karvan	2006		17	0
Defenders
3	Ismail Ediyev	(Russia)	DF	16 February 1988 (aged 18)	Youth Team	2005		6	0
4	Éder	(Brazil)	DF	7 October 1977 (aged 29)	Boavista	2005		31	1
6	Jalen Pokorn	(Slovenia)	DF	7 June 1979 (aged 27)	Hapoel Nazareth Illit	2005		27	0
18	Timur Dzhabrailov	(Russia)	DF	5 August 1973 (aged 33)	Angusht Nazran	2001			
25	Sergei Kurdyukov	(Russia)	DF	3 September 1982 (aged 24)	Spartak Tambov	2006		16	0
29	Roman Sharonov	(Russia)	DF	8 September 1976 (aged 30)	Rubin Kazan	2005		65	1
40	Rizvan Utsiyev	(Russia)	DF	7 February 1988 (aged 18)	Youth Team	2005		8	0
	Oleg Kornaukhov	(Russia)	DF	14 January 1975 (aged 31)	Shinnik Yaroslavl	2006		22	0
	Yevgeni Varlamov	(Russia)	DF	25 July 1975 (aged 31)	KAMAZ	2006		18	2
	Andrei Malay	(Russia)	DF	13 March 1973 (aged 33)	Sodovik Sterlitamak	2006		12	0
Midfielders
7	Taras Shelest	(Russia)	MF	3 February 1980 (aged 26)	Oryol	2006		16	0
8	Narvik Sırxayev	(Azerbaijan)	MF	16 March 1974 (aged 32)	Moscow	2004			
10	Musa Mazayev	(Russia)	MF	21 April 1977 (aged 29)	Druzhba Maykop	2001			
17	Vladislav Kulik	(Russia)	MF	27 February 1985 (aged 21)	Ural Yekaterinburg	2006		40	3
21	Murad Ramazanov	(Russia)	MF	10 March 1979 (aged 27)	Kryvbas Kryvyi Rih	2006		34	0
32	Nazhaddi Ibragimov	(Russia)	MF	25 July 1987 (aged 19)	Youth Team	2006		4	0
39	Adlan Katsayev	(Russia)	MF	20 February 1988 (aged 18)	Youth Team	2005		13	0
	Valeri Leonov	(Russia)	MF	17 September 1980 (aged 26)	loan from Moscow	2006		22	2
	Vladimir Leonchenko	(Russia)	MF	11 April 1972 (aged 34)	Alania Vladikavkaz	2006		18	3
	Eduard Kobozev	(Russia)	MF	13 September 1979 (aged 27)	KAMAZ	2006		15	0
	Alex	(Brazil)	MF	14 September 1984 (aged 22)	Nacional	2006		15	0
	Uladzimir Karytska	(Belarus)	MF	6 July 1979 (aged 27)	Alania Vladikavkaz	2005		37	2
	Yevgeni Ivanov	(Russia)	MF	24 August 1979 (aged 27)	Ryazan-Agrokomplekt Ryazan	2006		5	0
Forwards
9	Budun Budunov	(Russia)	FW	4 December 1975 (aged 30)	loan from Tom Tomsk	2006		21	5
11	Rizvan Sadayev	(Russia)	FW	26 August 1979 (aged 27)	Angusht Nazran	2001			
13	Mvondo Atangana	(Cameroon)	FW	10 July 1979 (aged 27)	Lokomotiv Minsk	2005		43	8
20	Magomed Adiyev	(Russia)	FW	30 June 1977 (aged 29)	Kryvbas Kryvyi Rih	2006		30	4
23	Zaur Sadayev	(Russia)	FW	6 November 1989 (aged 16)	Youth Team	2006		3	0
	Maksim Aristarkhov	(Russia)	FW	9 March 1980 (aged 26)	Metalurh Zaporizhya	2006		19	5
Away on loan
Players that left Terek Grozny during the season
12	Stanislav Kozyrev	(Russia)	GK	22 March 1987 (aged 19)	Nika Moscow	2006		11	0
45	Idris Zaynulabidov	(Russia)	FW	4 April 1986 (aged 20)	FC Khasavyurt	2005		6	0
88	Mikhail Rekudanov	(Russia)	DF	5 May 1985 (aged 21)	Luch-Energiya Vladivostok	2006		5	0
	Josimar	(Brazil)	DF	19 August 1985 (aged 21)		2006		16	4

== Transfers ==
=== In ===
Date	Position	Nationality	Name	From	Fee	Ref.
Winter 2006	GK	(Azerbaijan)	Dmitry Kramarenko	Karvan	Undisclosed	
Winter 2006	GK	(Russia)	Stanislav Kozyrev	Nika Moscow	Undisclosed	
Winter 2006	DF	(Brazil)	Josimar			
Winter 2006	DF	(Russia)	Oleg Kornaukhov	Shinnik Yaroslavl	Undisclosed	
Winter 2006	DF	(Russia)	Sergei Kurdyukov	Spartak Tambov	Undisclosed	
Winter 2006	DF	(Russia)	Mikhail Rekudanov	Luch-Energiya Vladivostok	Undisclosed	
Winter 2006	MF	(Russia)	Vladislav Kulik	Ural Yekaterinburg	Undisclosed	
Winter 2006	MF	(Russia)	Murad Ramazanov	Kryvbas Kryvyi Rih	Undisclosed	
Winter 2006	MF	(Brazil)	Alex	Nacional	Undisclosed	
Winter 2006	MF	(Russia)	Vladimir Leonchenko	Alania Vladikavkaz	Undisclosed	
Winter 2006	MF	(Russia)	Taras Shelest	Oryol	Undisclosed	
Winter 2006	MF	(Russia)	Yevgeni Ivanov	Ryazan-Agrokomplekt Ryazan	Undisclosed	
Winter 2006	FW	(Russia)	Magomed Adiyev	Kryvbas Kryvyi Rih	Undisclosed	
Winter 2006	FW	(Russia)	Maksim Aristarkhov	Metalurh Zaporizhya	Undisclosed	
Winter 2006	FW	(Russia)	Budun Budunov	Tom Tomsk	Undisclosed	
Summer 2006	DF	(Russia)	Andrei Malay	Sodovik Sterlitamak	Undisclosed	
Summer 2006	DF	(Russia)	Yevgeni Varlamov	KAMAZ	Undisclosed	
Summer 2006	MF	(Belarus)	Uladzimir Karytska	Metalurh Zaporizhya	Undisclosed	
Summer 2006	MF	(Russia)	Eduard Kobozev	KAMAZ	Undisclosed	

=== Loans in ===
Date from	Position	Nationality	Name	From	Date to	Ref.
Summer 2006	MF	(Russia)	Valeri Leonov	Moscow	End of Season	

=== Out ===
Date	Position	Nationality	Name	To	Fee	Ref.
Summer 2006	GK	(Russia)	Stanislav Kozyrev	Nika Moscow	Undisclosed	
Summer 2006	DF	(Russia)	Mikhail Rekudanov	Nika Moscow	Undisclosed	
Summer 2006	FW	(Russia)	Idris Zaynulabidov	Zvezda Serpukhov	Undisclosed	

== Competitions ==
=== First Division ===
==== Results by round ====
Round	1	2	3	4	5	6	7	8	9	10	11	12	13	14	15	16	17	18	19	20	21	22	23	24	25	26	27	28	29	30	31	32	33	34	35	36	37	38	39	40	41	42
Ground	H	H	A	A	H	H	A	A	H	H	A	A	A	H	H	A	A	H	H	A	A	H	H	A	A	H	H	A	A	H	H	H	A	A	H	H	A	A	H	H	A	A
Result	W	D	D	W	L	D	W	W	W	L	L	W	W	L	L	W	D	W	W	L	L	W	D	W	W	W	W	L	D	L	L	L	L	L	W	L	D	W	L	L	D	W

Updated to match(es) played on 5 November 2006. Source: See Results
A = Away; H = Home; W = Win; D = Draw; L = Loss

==== Results ====
26 March 2006 1	Terek Grozny	3 – 0	Angusht Nazran	Pyatigorsk
17:00 MSK (UTC+3)	Sırxayev 27'; Sharonov (yellow card) 47'; Adiyev 60'; Josimar 86'	Report		Stadium: Central Stadium; Attendance: 2,800; Referee: Yuri Klyuchnikov

29 March 2006 2	Terek Grozny	0 – 0	Mashuk-KMV	Pyatigorsk
17:00 MSK (UTC+3)	Dzhabrailov (yellow card) 40'; Ramazanov (yellow card) 78'	Report	Tsallagov (yellow card) 26'; Sylka (yellow card) 78'	Stadium: Central Stadium; Attendance: 5,000; Referee: Sergey Timofeev

5 April 2006 3	Anzhi Makhachkala	0 – 0	Terek Grozny	Kaspiysk
16:00 MSK (UTC+3)	Zoa (yellow card) 35'; Antipenko (yellow card) 85'; Abayev (yellow card) 87'	Report	Adiyev (yellow card) 33'; Budunov (yellow card) 35'; Kurdyukov (yellow card) 63'; Sırxayev (yellow card) 72'	Stadium: Anzhi Arena; Attendance: 8,400; Referee: Sergey Fursa

8 April 2006 4	Volgar-Gazprom	0 – 3	Terek Grozny	Astrakhan
16:00 MSK (UTC+3)	Otyutsky (yellow card) 54'; Surodin (yellow card) 66'	Report	Josimar 16'; Sırxayev 32'; Dzhabrailov 36'	Stadium: Central Stadium; Attendance: 8,500; Referee: Vitali Doroshenko

15 April 2006 5	Terek Grozny	0 – 1	Baltika Kaliningrad	Pyatigorsk
17:00 MSK (UTC+3)	Dzhabrailov (yellow card) 30'; Ivanov (yellow card) 60'; Budunov (yellow card) 67'; Kurdyukov (yellow card) 80'	Report	Tseryuta (yellow card) 12'; Kryshtafovich (yellow card) 17'; Khusyainov (yellow card) 29' (yellow-red card) 64'; Spirin (yellow card) 74'; Biang (yellow card) 89'	Stadium: Central Stadium; Attendance: 2,500; Referee: Alexey Reznikov

18 April 2006 6	Terek Grozny	2 – 2	Spartak Nizhny Novgorod	Pyatigorsk
17:00 MSK (UTC+3)	Budunov 16' (yellow card) 18'; Josimar (yellow card) 16'; Rekudanov (yellow card) 73'; Dzhabrailov 87'; Alex (yellow card) 90'; Ivanov (yellow card) 90'	Report	Nworgu (yellow card) 6'; Dyatel (yellow card) 12'; Samodin 34', 45'; Stepanets (yellow card) 84'; Kébé (yellow card) 85'; Oskolkov (red card)	Stadium: Central Stadium; Attendance: 2,900; Referee: Eduard Malyi

25 April 2006 7	Sibir Novosibirsk	0 – 1	Terek Grozny	Novosibirsk
16:00 MSK (UTC+3)	Samoylov (yellow card) 37'; Akimov (yellow card) 70'; Makarenko (yellow card) 71'	Report	Kulik 40'; Alex (yellow card) 67'	Stadium: Spartak Stadium; Attendance: 7,000; Referee: Alexander Evstigneev

28 April 2006 8	Metallurg Krasnoyarsk	1 – 2	Terek Grozny	Krasnoyarsk
14:30 MSK (UTC+3)	Bazanov 27'; Kachan (yellow card) 83'	Report	Sırxayev 32' (pen.); Dzhabrailov 36'; Kurdyukov (yellow card) 68'; Ramazanov (yellow card) 83'	Stadium: Central Stadium; Attendance: 5,500; Referee: Stanislav Sukhina

5 May 2006 9	Terek Grozny	1 – 0	Ural Yekaterinburg	Pyatigorsk
18:00 MSK (UTC+3)	Josimar 8'; Dzhabrailov (yellow card) 69'; Mazayev (yellow card) 90+1'	Report	Bakhtin (yellow card) 17'; Radkevich (yellow card) 48'	Stadium: Central Stadium; Attendance: 2,800; Referee: Nikolai Ivanov

8 May 2006 10	Terek Grozny	0 – 2	Sodovik Sterlitamak	Pyatigorsk
18:00 MSK (UTC+3)	Zaynulabidov (yellow card) 56'	Report	Zatsepin 16'; Sidyayev (yellow card) 26'; Shulenin 33'; Bondarenko (yellow card) 68'	Stadium: Central Stadium; Attendance: 2,000; Referee: Alexey Tyumin

15 May 2006 11	KAMAZ	2 – 0	Terek Grozny	Naberezhnye Chelny
18:00 MSK (UTC+3)	Varlamov 3'; Tsorayev (yellow card) 5'; Gotsiridze (yellow card) 29'; Kalimullin 48'; Belozyorov (yellow card) 87'	Report	Éder (yellow card) 5'; Zaynulabidov (yellow card) 26'; Kurdyukov (yellow card) 49'; Josimar (yellow card) 76'	Stadium: KAMAZ Stadium; Attendance: 7,000; Referee: Vladimir Pettay

18 May 2006 12	Lada	0 – 2	Terek Grozny	Tolyatti
17:30 MSK (UTC+3)	Deriglazov (yellow card) 33'	Report	Budunov (yellow card) 5' (goal) 6'; Pokorn (yellow card) 16'; Sırxayev 29'; Alex (yellow card) 40'; Goncharov (yellow card) 79'	Stadium: Torpedo Stadium; Attendance: 4,300; Referee: Alexander Gonchar

25 May 2006 13	Dynamo Makhachkala	0 – 1	Terek Grozny	Makhachkala
17:30 MSK (UTC+3)	Strelbin (yellow card) 14' (yellow-red card) 58'; Stolbovoy (yellow card) 26'; K.Gomlenko (yellow card) 58'; Timofeyev (yellow card) 59'; Agalarov (yellow card) 67'	Report	Dzhabrailov 52'; Mazayev (yellow card) 16' (red card) 67'; R.Sadayev (yellow card) 59'; Atangana (yellow card) 70'; Goncharov (yellow card) 90+1'	Stadium: Dynamo Stadium; Attendance: 5,300; Referee: Igor Zakharov

4 June 2006 14	Terek Grozny	1 – 2	Kuban Krasnodar	Pyatigorsk
19:00 MSK (UTC+3)	Sharonov (yellow card) 48'; Atangana 76'	Report	Asildarov 16' (yellow card) 71'; Strelkov 89'	Stadium: Central Stadium; Attendance: 3,800; Referee: Aleksandr Gvardis

7 June 2006 15	Terek Grozny	1 – 3	Fakel Voronezh	Pyatigorsk
19:00 MSK (UTC+3)	Kulik 34'	Report	Prokopenko 11', 51' (yellow card) 53'; Gordeyev 43'; Gorin (yellow card) 73'	Stadium: Central Stadium; Attendance: 2,500; Referee: Dmitry Popov

14 June 2006 16	Avangard Kursk	3 – 4	Terek Grozny	Kursk
18:30 MSK (UTC+3)	Sinyayev 12', 88'; Panin (yellow card) 24'; Bukiyevsky (yellow card) 27'; O.Golovan (yellow card) 30'; Firsov 77'	Report	R.Sadayev 7'; Adiyev (yellow card) 66'; Dzhabrailov 70'; Atangana 82'; Budunov 83'	Stadium: Trudovye Rezervy Stadium; Attendance: 9,000; Referee: Vladislav Bezborodov

17 June 2006 17	Salyut-Energiya	0 – 0	Terek Grozny	Belgorod
18:30 MSK (UTC+3)	Lipko (yellow card) 48'	Report	Sharonov (yellow card) 57'	Stadium: Energomash Stadium; Attendance: 11,000; Referee: Maksim Layushkin

25 June 2006 18	Terek Grozny	1 – 0	Oryol	Pyatigorsk
18:30 MSK (UTC+3)	Josimar 83'	Report	Mikhailov (yellow card) 9'; Panov (yellow card) 19'	Stadium: Central Stadium; Attendance: 2,200; Referee: Mikhail Semenov

28 June 2006 19	Terek Grozny	1 – 0	Dynamo Bryansk	Pyatigorsk
18:30 MSK (UTC+3)	Sırxayev 12'; Ramazanov (yellow card) 52'; Dzhabrailov (yellow card) 56'	Report	Malin (yellow card) 20'	Stadium: Central Stadium; Attendance: 2,500; Referee: Yuri Kunitsa

5 July 2006 20	SKA-Energia Khabarovsk	1 – 0	Terek Grozny	Khabarovsk
12:00 MSK (UTC+3)	Karmazinenko 11'; V.Lotz (yellow card) 25'; Poddubskiy (yellow card) 73'	Report	Budunov (yellow card) 29'; Dzhabrailov (yellow card) 33'; Mazayev (yellow card) 83'	Stadium: Lenin Stadium; Attendance: 8,000; Referee: Sergei Marushko

8 July 2006 21	Khimki	3 – 0	Terek Grozny	Khimki
19:00 MSK (UTC+3)	Voznesensky 17'; Arkhipov 31'; Jovanović 59'	Report	Katsayev (yellow card) 26'; Dzhabrailov (yellow card) 58'	Stadium: Novye Khimki Stadium; Attendance: 2,100; Referee: Aleksei Sergeyev

25 July 2006 22	Terek Grozny	3 – 2	Anzhi Makhachkala	Pyatigorsk
19:00 MSK (UTC+3)	Varlamov 19'; Leonchenko 63' (pen.); Kulik (yellow card) 82'; Ramazanov (yellow card) 90'	Report	Antipenko 32'; Zhukov (yellow card) 54' (yellow-red card) 85' (goal) 80'	Stadium: Central Stadium; Attendance: 2,800; Referee: Alexei Kovalev

28 July 2006 23	Terek Grozny	0 – 0	Volgar-Gazprom	Pyatigorsk
19:00 MSK (UTC+3)	Karytska (yellow card) 15'	Report	Magzhanov (yellow card) 21'; Shipilov (yellow card) 52'; Ksanayev (yellow card) 70'	Stadium: Central Stadium; Attendance: 2,700; Referee: Alexander Evstigneev

4 August 2006 24	Baltika Kaliningrad	1 – 2	Terek Grozny	Kaliningrad
20:00 MSK (UTC+3)	Spirin (yellow card) 26'; Tumenko 53'; Takam (yellow card) 80'	Report	Sırxayev (penalty missed) 63'; Ramazanov (yellow card) 80'; Sharonov 85'; Aristarkhov 88'	Stadium: Baltika Stadium; Attendance: 3,500; Referee: Igor Lukin

7 August 2006 25	Spartak Nizhny Novgorod	0 – 1	Terek Grozny	Nizhny Novgorod
18:00 MSK (UTC+3)	Denisov (yellow card) 28'; Denis Semyonov (yellow card) 66' (yellow-red card) 90'; Kovalyov (yellow card) 82'; Priganiuc (yellow card) 87'; Pankov (yellow card) 90'	Report	Varlamov (yellow card) 30'; Leonchenko 39' (pen.); Kornaukhov (yellow card) 67'; Kobozev (yellow card) 85'	Stadium: Lokomotiv Stadium; Attendance: 2,000; Referee: Aleksei Nikolaev

14 August 2006 26	Terek Grozny	2 – 0	Sibir Novosibirsk	Pyatigorsk
19:00 MSK (UTC+3)	Aristarkhov 28'; Varlamov (yellow card) 42'; Leonov 59'; Ramazanov (yellow card) 83'	Report	Andrei Nikolayev (yellow card) 13'; Sharin (yellow card) 22'; Makarenko (yellow card) 63'; Samoylov (yellow card) 73'; Bukhryakov (yellow card) 80'	Stadium: Central Stadium; Attendance: 3,100; Referee: Igor Egorov

17 August 2006 27	Terek Grozny	3 – 0	Metallurg Krasnoyarsk	Pyatigorsk
19:00 MSK (UTC+3)	Aristarkhov 5'; Leonov 25'; Leonchenko (yellow card) 45'; Mazayev 90'	Report	Korobkin (yellow card) 4'; Guskov (yellow card) 23'; Bakulin (yellow card) 37'	Stadium: Central Stadium; Attendance: 2,400; Referee: Vitali Doroshenko

24 August 2006 28	Ural Yekaterinburg	2 – 0	Terek Grozny	Yekaterinburg
16:00 MSK (UTC+3)	Katulsky 28'; Mysin 69'	Report	Malay (yellow card) 42'; Karytska (yellow card) 59'	Stadium: Uralmash Stadium; Attendance: 3,500; Referee: Yuri Klyuchnikov

27 August 2006 29	Sodovik Sterlitamak	1 – 1	Terek Grozny	Sterlitamak
16:00 MSK (UTC+3)	Zernov 25'; Shulenin (yellow card) 55'	Report	Slavnov 30' (o.g.); Malay (yellow card) 53'; Kobozev (yellow card) 60'; Sharonov (yellow card) 86'; Varlamov (yellow card) 86'	Stadium: Sodovik Stadium; Attendance: 5,000; Referee: Maksim Layushkin

3 September 2006 30	Terek Grozny	0 – 1	KAMAZ	Pyatigorsk
19:00 MSK (UTC+3)		Report	Todorović (yellow card) 24'; Zurayev (yellow card) 32'; Kalimullin 67'	Stadium: Central Stadium; Attendance: 2,800; Referee: Alexander Kabakov

6 September 2006 31	Terek Grozny	0 – 1	Lada	Pyatigorsk
18:30 MSK (UTC+3)	Varlamov (yellow card) 37'	Report	Kaynov (yellow card) 39'; Tabakov 62' (yellow card) 85'	Stadium: Central Stadium; Attendance: 100; Referee: Alexander Kolobaev

13 September 2006 32	Terek Grozny	0 – 1	Dynamo Makhachkala	Pyatigorsk
17:30 MSK (UTC+3)		Report	Sadirov 36' (yellow card) 53'; Tonga (yellow card) 58'	Stadium: Central Stadium; Attendance: 2,200; Referee: Denis Kozmin

23 September 2006 33	Kuban Krasnodar	3 – 1	Terek Grozny	Krasnodar
19:00 MSK (UTC+3)	Strelkov 5' (yellow card) 62'; Ivanov 17' (pen.); Tlisov 90'	Report	Karytska (yellow card) 9'; Aristarkhov 43'	Stadium: Kuban Stadium; Attendance: 12,000; Referee: Igor Lukin

26 September 2006 34	Fakel Voronezh	2 – 1	Terek Grozny	Voronezh
18:30 MSK (UTC+3)	Usikov 27'; Lunin (yellow card) 31' (yellow-red card) 90'; Prokopenko 70'; Gikayev (yellow card) 87'; Dyakonov (yellow card) 89'	Report	Pokorn (yellow card) 24'; Éder 75'	Stadium: Tsentralnyi Profsoyuz Stadion; Attendance: 5,000; Referee: Vyacheslav Kharlamov

3 October 2006 35	Terek Grozny	1 – 0	Avangard Kursk	Pyatigorsk
17:00 MSK (UTC+3)	Kulik (yellow card) 7'; Adiyev 37' (pen.); Varlamov (yellow card) 62'; Ramazanov (yellow card) 72'	Report		Stadium: Central Stadium; Attendance: 2,000; Referee: Vladimir Kazmenko

6 October 2006 36	Terek Grozny	0 – 2	Salyut-Energiya	Pyatigorsk
17:00 MSK (UTC+3)	Kornaukhov (yellow card) 40'	Report	Vasilyev 10'; Leshonok 15'; Bugakov (yellow card) 16'; Murnin (yellow card) 26'; Zakharov (yellow card) 70'	Stadium: Central Stadium; Attendance: 1,200; Referee: Alexei Kovalev

13 October 2006 37	Oryol	1 – 1	Terek Grozny	Oryol
16:00 MSK (UTC+3)	Willer (yellow card) 29'; A.Kopilov 36' (yellow card) 45' (red card) 75'; Pavlenko (yellow card) 62'	Report	Malay (yellow card) 25'; Ramazanov (red card) 75'; Karytska 87'	Stadium: Central Stadium; Attendance: 3,000; Referee: Mikhail Semenov

16 October 2006 38	Dynamo Bryansk	1 – 2	Terek Grozny	Bryansk
16:00 MSK (UTC+3)	Tolstykh 33'	Report	Aristarkhov 54' (yellow card) 90'; Kulik (yellow card) 55'; Adiyev (yellow card) 69'; Sharonov (yellow card) 72'; Varlamov 89'	Stadium: Dynamo Stadium; Attendance: 2,000; Referee: Sergey Andreyev

23 October 2006 39	Terek Grozny	1 – 3	SKA-Energia Khabarovsk	Pyatigorsk
16:00 MSK (UTC+3)	R.Sadayev (yellow card) 2'; Malay (yellow card) 68'; Sharonov (yellow card) 74'; Leonchenko 79' (pen.)	Report	Dimidko (yellow card) 30'; Piyuk 41'; Poddubskiy (yellow card) 50'; Karmazinenko 55'; Nikiforov 76'	Stadium: Central Stadium; Attendance: 1,200; Referee: Sergei Karasev

26 October 2006 40	Terek Grozny	2 – 3	Khimki	Pyatigorsk
16:00 MSK (UTC+3)	Ibragimov (yellow card) 53'; Atangana 62'; Adiyev 81' (pen.)	Report	Tikhonov 54' (pen.), 67', 75' (pen.)	Stadium: Central Stadium; Attendance: 1,200; Referee: Vladimir Vlasov

2 November 2006 41	Angusht Nazran	2 – 2	Terek Grozny	Nazran
17:00 MSK (UTC+3)	Fomenko 40'; Khaskhanov (penalty missed) 51' 76'; Barakhoyev (yellow card) 77'	Report	Atangana 25'; R.Sadayev 49'	Stadium: Rashid Aushev Central Stadium; Attendance: 1,800; Referee: Yuri Klyuchnikov

5 November 2006 42	Mashuk-KMV	1 – 2	Terek Grozny	Pyatigorsk
13:00 MSK (UTC+3)	Storozhuk (yellow card) 13'; Gogberashvili (yellow card) 25' (goal) 65'	Report	Atangana 8'; Sırxayev 22'; Ramazanov (yellow card) 40'	Stadium: Central Stadium; Attendance: 2,900; Referee: Yuri Kunitsa

==== League table ====
Pos	Team	Pld	W	D	L	GF	GA	GD	Pts
6	Sodovik Sterlitamak	42	18	15	9	59	35	+24	69
7	Sibir Novosibirsk	42	19	8	15	67	45	+22	65
8	Terek Grozny	42	18	8	16	48	47	+1	62
9	Dynamo Bryansk	42	17	10	15	42	38	+4	61
10	Avangard Kursk	42	16	13	13	45	38	+7	61

Source: PFL, RSSSF

=== Russian Cup ===
==== 2005–06 ====
4 March 2006 Round of 16 1st leg	Zenit St.Petersburg	2 – 0	Terek Grozny	Saint Petersburg
20:00 MSK (UTC+3)	Škrtel 24'; Kerzhakov 69'	Report	Sharonov (yellow card) 63'; Kurdyukov (yellow card) 77'	Stadium: Petrovsky Stadium; Attendance: 8,300; Referee: Alexey Sergeev

12 March 2006 Round of 16 2nd leg	Terek Grozny	1 – 0 (1 – 2 agg.)	Zenit St.Petersburg	Pyatigorsk
16:00 MSK (UTC+3)	Adiyev (yellow card) 4'; Dzhabrailov 60'	Report		Stadium: Central Stadium; Attendance: 4,000; Referee: Aleksei Nikolaev

==== 2006–07 ====
2 July 2006 Round of 32 1st leg	Terek Grozny	4 – 1	Moscow	Pyatigorsk
18:30 MSK (UTC+3)	Pokorn (yellow card) 8'; Budunov 12', 29' (pen.); Atangana 46'; Sırxayev 81'	Report	Sukhov (yellow card) 79'; Danilin 84'	Stadium: Central Stadium; Attendance: 2,800; Referee: Vladimir Pettay

20 September 2006 Round of 32 2nd leg	Moscow	4 – 0 (5 – 4 agg.)	Terek Grozny	Moscow
18:00 MSK (UTC+3)	Barrientos 8'; Kirichenko 14', 39'; Bystrov 75'	Report	Dzhabrailov (yellow card) 27'; Karytska (yellow card) 32'; Sharonov (yellow card) 47'	Stadium: Eduard Streltsov Stadium; Attendance: 3,500; Referee: Stanislav Sukhina

== Squad statistics ==
As of match played 5 November 2006

=== Appearances and goals ===
No.	Pos	Nat	Player	Total		Premier League		05-06 Russian Cup		06-07 Russian Cup	
No.	Pos	Nat	Player	Apps	Goals	Apps	Goals	Apps	Goals	Apps	Goals
1	GK	(Russia) RUS	Dmitri Goncharov	14	0	13	0	0	0	1	0
3	DF	(Russia) RUS	Ismail Ediyev	4	0	4	0	0	0	0	0
4	DF	(Brazil) BRA	Éder	24	1	20+1	1	2	0	1	0
6	DF	(Slovenia) SLO	Jalen Pokorn	20	0	14+4	0	0+1	0	1	0
7	MF	(Russia) RUS	Taras Shelest	16	0	7+8	0	0+1	0	0	0
8	MF	(Azerbaijan) AZE	Narvik Sırxayev	31	6	26+1	5	2	0	2	1
9	FW	(Russia) RUS	Budun Budunov	21	5	13+6	3	0+1	0	1	2
10	MF	(Russia) RUS	Musa Mazayev	32	1	13+16	1	2	0	0+1	0
11	FW	(Russia) RUS	Rizvan Sadayev	15	2	12+2	2	0+1	0	0	0
13	FW	(Cameroon) CMR	Mvondo Atangana	34	6	16+15	5	2	0	1	1
17	MF	(Russia) RUS	Vladislav Kulik	40	3	29+8	3	2	0	1	0
18	MF	(Russia) RUS	Timur Dzhabrailov	34	6	28+3	5	2	1	1	0
20	FW	(Russia) RUS	Magomed Adiyev	29	4	22+3	4	2	0	1+1	0
21	MF	(Russia) RUS	Murad Ramazanov	34	0	25+6	0	2	0	1	0
23	FW	(Russia) RUS	Zaur Sadayev	5	0	1+4	0	0	0	0	0
25	DF	(Russia) RUS	Sergei Kurdyukov	16	0	12+2	0	2	0	0	0
29	DF	(Russia) RUS	Roman Sharonov	41	1	36+1	1	2	0	2	0
32	MF	(Russia) RUS	Nazhaddi Ibragimov	4	0	4	0	0	0	0	0
39	MF	(Russia) RUS	Adlan Katsayev	12	0	6+6	0	0	0	0	0
40	DF	(Russia) RUS	Rizvan Utsiyev	7	0	7	0	0	0	0	0
	GK	(Azerbaijan) AZE	Dmitry Kramarenko	17	0	16	0	0	0	1	0
	GK	(Russia) RUS	Rizavdi Edilov	4	0	4	0	0	0	0	0
	DF	(Russia) RUS	Oleg Kornaukhov	22	0	18+2	0	0	0	2	0
	DF	(Russia) RUS	Andrei Malay	12	0	9+2	0	0	0	0+1	0
	DF	(Russia) RUS	Yevgeni Varlamov	18	2	17	2	0	0	1	0
	MF	(Brazil) BRA	Alex	15	0	14+1	0	0	0	0	0
	MF	(Belarus) BLR	Uladzimir Karytska	13	1	10+2	1	0	0	1	0
	MF	(Russia) RUS	Yevgeni Ivanov	5	0	5	0	0	0	0	0
	MF	(Russia) RUS	Eduard Kobozev	15	0	7+8	0	0	0	0	0
	MF	(Russia) RUS	Vladimir Leonchenko	18	3	15+1	3	0	0	1+1	0
	MF	(Russia) RUS	Valeri Leonov	22	2	12+8	2	0	0	2	0
	FW	(Russia) RUS	Maksim Aristarkhov	19	5	16+2	5	0	0	1	0
Players away from the club on loan:
Players who appeared for Terek Grozny but left during the season:
12	GK	(Russia) RUS	Stanislav Kozyrev	11	0	9	0	2	0	0	0
45	FW	(Russia) RUS	Idris Zaynulabidov	5	0	1+4	0	0	0	0	0
88	DF	(Russia) RUS	Mikhail Rekudanov	5	0	3+2	0	0	0	0	0
	DF	(Brazil) BRA	Josimar	16	4	8+7	4	0	0	0+1	0

=== Goal scorers ===
Place	Position	Nation	Number	Name	Premier League	05-06 Russian Cup	06-07 Russian Cup	Total
1	MF	(Azerbaijan)	8	Narvik Sırxayev	5	0	1	6
1	DF	(Russia)	18	Timur Dzhabrailov	5	1	0	6
1	FW	(Cameroon)	13	Mvondo Atangana	5	0	1	6
4	FW	(Russia)		Maksim Aristarkhov	5	0	0	5
4	FW	(Russia)	9	Budun Budunov	3	0	2	5
6	DF	(Brazil)		Josimar	4	0	0	4
6	FW	(Russia)	20	Magomed Adiyev	4	0	0	4
8	MF	(Russia)	17	Vladislav Kulik	3	0	0	3
8	MF	(Russia)		Vladimir Leonchenko	3	0	0	3
10	DF	(Russia)		Yevgeni Varlamov	2	0	0	2
10	MF	(Russia)		Valeri Leonov	2	0	0	2
10	FW	(Russia)	11	Rizvan Sadayev	2	0	0	2
13	DF	(Brazil)	4	Éder	1	0	0	1
13	DF	(Russia)	29	Roman Sharonov	1	0	0	1
13	DF	(Belarus)		Uladzimir Karytska	1	0	0	1
13	MF	(Russia)	10	Musa Mazayev	1	0	0	1
13				Own goal	1	0	0	1
Total					48	1	4	53

=== Clean sheets ===
Place	Position	Nation	Number	Name	Premier League	05-06 Russian Cup	06-07 Russian Cup	Total
1	GK	(Russia)	1	Dmitri Goncharov	6	0	0	6
1	GK	(Russia)	12	Stanislav Kozyrev	5	1	0	6
3	GK	(Azerbaijan)		Dmitry Kramarenko	5	0	0	5
Total					16	1	0	17

=== Disciplinary record ===
Number	Nation	Position	Name	Premier League		05-06 Russian Cup		06-07 Russian Cup		Total	
Number	Nation	Position	Name	Yellow card	Red card	Yellow card	Red card	Yellow card	Red card	Yellow card	Red card
1	(Russia)	GK	Dmitri Goncharov	2	0	0	0	0	0	2	0
4	(Brazil)	DF	Éder	1	0	0	0	0	0	1	0
6	(Slovenia)	DF	Jalen Pokorn	2	0	0	0	1	0	3	0
8	(Azerbaijan)	MF	Narvik Sırxayev	1	0	0	0	0	0	1	0
9	(Russia)	FW	Budun Budunov	5	0	0	0	0	0	5	0
10	(Russia)	MF	Musa Mazayev	3	1	0	0	0	0	3	1
11	(Russia)	FW	Rizvan Sadayev	2	0	0	0	0	0	2	0
13	(Cameroon)	FW	Mvondo Atangana	1	0	0	0	0	0	1	0
17	(Russia)	MF	Vladislav Kulik	3	0	0	0	0	0	3	0
18	(Russia)	DF	Timur Dzhabrailov	6	0	0	0	1	0	7	0
20	(Russia)	FW	Magomed Adiyev	3	0	1	0	0	0	4	0
21	(Russia)	MF	Murad Ramazanov	8	1	0	0	0	0	8	1
25	(Russia)	DF	Sergei Kurdyukov	4	0	1	0	0	0	5	0
29	(Russia)	DF	Roman Sharonov	6	0	1	0	1	0	8	0
32	(Russia)	MF	Nazhaddi Ibragimov	1	0	0	0	0	0	1	0
39	(Russia)	MF	Adlan Katsayev	1	0	0	0	0	0	1	0
	(Russia)	DF	Oleg Kornaukhov	2	0	0	0	0	0	2	0
	(Russia)	DF	Andrei Malay	4	0	0	0	0	0	4	0
	(Russia)	DF	Yevgeni Varlamov	5	0	0	0	0	0	5	0
	(Brazil)	MF	Alex	3	0	0	0	0	0	3	0
	(Belarus)	MF	Uladzimir Karytska	3	0	0	0	1	0	4	0
	(Russia)	MF	Yevgeni Ivanov	2	0	0	0	0	0	2	0
	(Russia)	MF	Eduard Kobozev	2	0	0	0	0	0	2	0
	(Russia)	MF	Vladimir Leonchenko	1	0	0	0	0	0	1	0
	(Russia)	FW	Maksim Aristarkhov	1	0	0	0	0	0	1	0
Players away on loan:
Players who left Terek Grozny during the season:
45	(Russia)	FW	Idris Zaynulabidov	2	0	0	0	0	0	2	0
88	(Russia)	DF	Mikhail Rekudanov	1	0	0	0	0	0	1	0
	(Brazil)	DF	Josimar	2	0	0	0	0	0	2	0
Total				77	2	3	0	4	0	84	2
