= 2005 FC Terek Grozny season =

Terek Grozny
2005 season
- Manager: Vait Talgayev (until 22 October); Aleksandr Tarkhanov (Caretaker) (from 23 October)
- Stadium: Central Stadium
- Premier League: 16th
- Russian Cup: Progressed to 2006 season
- Russian Super Cup: Runners Up
- Top goalscorer: League: Roman Adamov (7); All: Roman Adamov (10)
Home colours	Away colours

The 2005 Terek Grozny season was the first season that the club played in the Russian Premier League, the highest tier of association football in Russia. They finished the season bottom of the league, 16th, on 14 points after receiving a six-point deduction for failing to pay a transfer fee in time.

== Squad ==
As of match played 19 November 2005

No.	Name	Nationality	Position	Date of birth (age)	Signed from	Signed in	Contract ends	Apps.	Goals
Goalkeepers
1	Volodymyr Savchenko	(Ukraine)	GK	11 September 1973 (aged 32)	Rostov	2004			
12	Adam Ismailov	(Russia)	GK	1 May 1976 (aged 29)	Shakhtyor Shakhty	2004			
16	Dmitri Goncharov	(Russia)	GK	15 April 1975 (aged 30)	Kuban Krasnodar	2005		9	0
27	Ruslan Nigmatullin	(Russia)	GK	7 October 1974 (aged 31)	Lokomotiv Moscow	2005		21	0
35	Rizavdi Edilov	(Russia)	GK	26 June 1988 (aged 17)	Youth Team	2005		0	0
Defenders
2	Aleksandr Shmarko	(Russia)	DF	12 March 1969 (aged 36)	Rostselmash	2003			
3	Deni Gaisumov	(Azerbaijan)	DF	6 February 1968 (aged 37)	Atyrau	2002			
5	Maksim Bokov	(Russia)	DF	29 August 1973 (aged 32)	Uralan Elista	2003			
6	Gennadiy Nizhegorodov	(Russia)	DF	7 June 1977 (aged 28)	Lokomotiv Moscow	2005		16	0
18	Timur Dzhabrailov	(Russia)	DF	5 August 1973 (aged 32)	Angusht Nazran	2001			
19	Denis Yevsikov	(Russia)	DF	19 February 1981 (aged 24)	Lokomotiv Moscow	2004			
22	Aleksandr Lipko	(Russia)	DF	18 August 1975 (aged 30)	Rubin Kazan	2003			
28	Roman Sharonov	(Russia)	DF	8 September 1976 (aged 29)	Rubin Kazan	2005		24	0
31	Ismail Ediyev	(Russia)	DF	16 February 1988 (aged 17)	Youth Team	2005		2	0
36	Ismail Khalinbekov	(Russia)	DF	3 September 1985 (aged 20)	Anzhi-Khazar Makhachkala	2005		1	0
40	Rizvan Utsiyev	(Russia)	DF	7 February 1988 (aged 17)	Youth Team	2005		1	0
49	Igor Lazič	(Slovenia)	DF	30 October 1979 (aged 26)	Celje	2005		4	0
50	Éder	(Brazil)	DF	7 October 1977 (aged 28)	Boavista	2005		7	0
55	Jalen Pokorn	(Slovenia)	DF	7 June 1979 (aged 26)	Hapoel Nazareth Illit	2005		7	0
Midfielders
8	Narvik Sırxayev	(Azerbaijan)	MF	16 March 1974 (aged 31)	Moscow	2004			
10	Musa Mazayev	(Russia)	MF	21 April 1977 (aged 28)	Druzhba Maykop	2001			
14	Tamer Tuna	(Turkey)	MF	1 July 1976 (aged 29)	Samsunspor	2005		22	0
15	Viktor Bulatov	(Russia)	MF	22 January 1972 (aged 33)	Krylia Sovetov	2004			
17	Denis Klyuyev	(Russia)	MF	7 September 1973 (aged 32)	Shinnik Yaroslavl	2004			
21	Ruslan Ajinjal	(Russia)	MF	22 June 1974 (aged 31)	Uralan Elista	2004			
26	Laryea Kingston	(Ghana)	MF	7 November 1980 (aged 25)	Moscow	2005		11	0
32	Nazhaddi Ibragimov	(Russia)	MF	5 July 1987 (aged 18)	Youth Team	2005		0	0
39	Adlan Katsayev	(Russia)	MF	20 February 1988 (aged 17)	Youth Team	2005		1	0
47	Uladzimir Karytska	(Belarus)	MF	6 July 1979 (aged 26)	Alania Vladikavkaz	2005		24	1
87	Serhiy Boyko	(Ukraine)	MF	6 August 1987 (aged 18)	Dnipro Dnipropetrovsk	2005		2	0
Forwards
9	Andrei Fedkov	(Russia)	FW	4 July 1971 (aged 34)	Sokol Saratov	2004			
13	Mvondo Atangana	(Cameroon)	FW	10 July 1979 (aged 26)	Lokomotiv Minsk	2005		9	2
20	Roman Adamov	(Russia)	FW	21 June 1982 (aged 23)	Rostov	2004			
30	Rizvan Sadayev	(Russia)	FW	26 August 1979 (aged 26)	Angusht Nazran	2001			
45	Idris Zaynulabidov	(Russia)	FW	4 April 1986 (aged 19)	FC Khasavyurt	2005		1	0
77	Ognjen Koroman	(Serbia and Montenegro)	FW	19 September 1978 (aged 27)	Krylia Sovetov	2005		6	1
Away on loan
Players that left Terek Grozny during the season
4	Serhiy Datsenko	(Ukraine)	DF	10 December 1977 (aged 27)	Rostov	2005		5	0
7	Dmitri Khomukha	(Turkmenistan)	MF	23 August 1969 (aged 36)	Shinnik Yaroslavl	2004			
11	Oleg Teryokhin	(Russia)	FW	12 August 1970 (aged 35)	Chernomorets Novorossiysk	2004			
24	Aleksandr Shirko	(Russia)	FW	24 November 1976 (aged 28)	Shinnik Yaroslavl	2005		3	0
33	Yevhen Lysytsyn	(Ukraine)	MF	16 July 1981 (aged 24)	Fakel Voronezh	2004			

== Transfers ==
=== In ===
Date	Position	Nationality	Name	From	Fee	Ref.
Winter 2005	GK	(Russia)	Dmitri Goncharov	Kuban Krasnodar	Undisclosed	
Winter 2005	GK	(Russia)	Ruslan Nigmatullin	Lokomotiv Moscow	Undisclosed	
Winter 2005	DF	(Ukraine)	Serhiy Datsenko	Rostov	Undisclosed	
Winter 2005	DF	(Russia)	Gennadiy Nizhegorodov	Lokomotiv Moscow	Undisclosed	
Winter 2005	DF	(Russia)	Roman Sharonov	Rubin Kazan	Undisclosed	
Winter 2005	DF	(Russia)	Ismail Khalinbekov	Anzhi-Khazar Makhachkala	Undisclosed	
Winter 2005	MF	(Belarus)	Uladzimir Karytska	Alania Vladikavkaz	Undisclosed	
Winter 2005	FW	(Russia)	Aleksandr Shirko	Shinnik Yaroslavl	Free	
Winter 2005	FW	(Russia)	Idris Zaynulabidov	Khasavyurt	Free	
Summer 2005	DF	(Brazil)	Éder	Boavista	Undisclosed	
Summer 2005	DF	(Slovenia)	Igor Lazič	Celje	Undisclosed	
Summer 2005	DF	(Slovenia)	Jalen Pokorn	Hapoel Nazareth Illit	Undisclosed	
Summer 2005	MF	(Ghana)	Laryea Kingston	Krylia Sovetov	Undisclosed	
Summer 2005	MF	(Turkey)	Tamer Tuna	Samsunspor	Undisclosed	
Summer 2005	MF	(Ukraine)	Serhiy Boyko	Dnipro Dnipropetrovsk	Undisclosed	
Summer 2005	FW	(Cameroon)	Mvondo Atangana	Lokomotiv Minsk	Undisclosed	
Summer 2005	FW	(Serbia and Montenegro)	Ognjen Koroman	Krylia Sovetov	Undisclosed	

=== Out ===
Date	Position	Nationality	Name	To	Fee	Ref.
Summer 2005	DF	(Ukraine)	Serhiy Datsenko	Arsenal Kyiv	Undisclosed	
Summer 2005	DF	(Ukraine)	Yevhen Lysytsyn	Stal Kamianske	Undisclosed	
Summer 2005	FW	(Russia)	Aleksandr Shirko	Shinnik Yaroslavl	Free	

=== Released ===
Date	Position	Nationality	Name	Joined	Date
Summer 2005	MF	(Turkmenistan)	Dmitri Khomukha	Retired	
Summer 2005	FW	(Russia)	Oleg Teryokhin	Salyut Belgorod	

=== Trial ===
Date From	Position	Nationality	Name	Last club	Date To	Ref.
7 July 2005	MF	(Bulgaria)	Svetoslav Petrov	Kuban Krasnodar		

== Competitions ==
=== Super Cup ===
6 March 2005	Lokomotiv Moscow	1 – 0	Terek Grozny	Moscow
16:00 MSK (UTC+3)	Asatiani (yellow card) 53'; Loskov 74' (pen.)	Report		Stadium: Lokomotiv Stadium; Attendance: 9,000; Referee: Vladimir Pettay

=== Premier League ===
==== Results by round ====
Round	1	2	3	4	5	6	7	8	9	10	11	12	13	14	15	16	17	18	19	20	21	22	23	24	25	26	27	28	29	30
Ground	A	H	A	H	A	H	A	H	A	H	A	H	A	A	H	H	A	H	A	H	A	H	A	H	A	H	A	H	H	A
Result	L	W	L	L	L	W	L	D	D	D	L	L	L	L	L	W	W	D	L	L	L	L	L	L	D	L	W	L	L	L

Updated to match(es) played on 19 November 2005. Source: See Results
A = Away; H = Home; W = Win; D = Draw; L = Loss

==== Results ====
13 March 2005 1	CSKA Moscow	3 – 0	Terek Grozny	Moscow
17:00 MSK (UTC+3)	Olić 19'; Carvalho 60'; Rahimić 83'	Report	Klyuyev (yellow card) 59'	Stadium: Luzhniki Stadium; Attendance: 9,000; Referee: Yuri Klyuchnikov

20 March 2005 2	Terek Grozny	2 – 0	Krylia Sovetov	Pyatigorsk
16:00 MSK (UTC+3)	Bulatov (yellow card) 12'; Teryokhin 52'; Sırxayev (yellow card) 59'; Nizhegorodov (yellow card) 62'; Adamov 71'	Report		Stadium: Central Stadium; Attendance: 5,800; Referee: Alexey Tyumin

3 April 2005 3	Zenit St.Petersburg	5 – 1	Terek Grozny	Saint Petersburg
16:00 MSK (UTC+3)	Arshavin 26', 36', 62' (pen.); Radimov 51', 88'; Hagen (yellow card) 64'; Škrtel (yellow card) 73'	Report	Bokov (yellow card) 7'; Nizhegorodov (yellow card) 28'; Adamov (yellow card) 53'; Fedkov 74'	Stadium: Petrovsky Stadium; Attendance: 20,500; Referee: Mikhail Veselovsky

10 April 2005 4	Terek Grozny	0 – 1	Torpedo Moscow	Pyatigorsk
17:00 MSK (UTC+3)		Report	Zyryanov 9'	Stadium: Central Stadium; Attendance: 7,200; Referee: Aleksandr Gvardis

16 April 2005 5	Shinnik Yaroslavl	2 – 1	Terek Grozny	Yaroslavl
16:00 MSK (UTC+3)	D.Vasilyev (yellow card) 26'; Spahić (yellow card) 49' (goal) 90+' (pen.); Khazov 73'; D.Vasilyev (yellow card) 90+'	Report	Shmarko (yellow card) 34'; Teryokhin (yellow card) 49'; Fedkov 69'; Bokov (yellow card) 79'	Stadium: Shinnik Stadium; Attendance: 13,500; Referee: Valentin Ivanov

23 April 2005 6	Terek Grozny	1 – 0	Saturn	Pyatigorsk
18:00 MSK (UTC+3)	Fedkov 67'; Ajinjal (yellow card) 90+'	Report		Stadium: Central Stadium; Attendance: 7,500; Referee: Yuri Baskakov

1 May 2005 7	Spartak Moscow	3 – 0	Terek Grozny	Moscow
18:00 MSK (UTC+3)	Dedura 20'; Vidić (yellow card) 52'; Kováč (yellow card) 73'; Boyarintsev 88'; Kalynychenko 90+' (yellow card) 90+'	Report	Lipko (yellow card) 82'	Stadium: Luzhniki Stadium; Attendance: 12,000; Referee: Sergey Fursa

15 May 2005 8	Terek Grozny	0 – 0	Moscow	Pyatigorsk
18:30 MSK (UTC+3)		Report	Tchuissé (yellow card) 56'; Stoica (yellow card) 87'	Stadium: Central Stadium; Attendance: 6,500; Referee: Aleksandr Gvardis

21 May 2005 9	Rubin Kazan	1 – 1	Terek Grozny	Kazan
16:00 MSK (UTC+3)	Čížek 2'; Ayupov (yellow card) 17'; Rôni (penalty missed) 58'	Report	Datsenko (yellow card) 29'; Ajinjal (yellow card) 56'; Fedkov 78' (yellow card) 81'	Stadium: Central Stadium; Attendance: 7,000; Referee: Sergei Martynov

28 May 2005 10	Terek Grozny	2 – 2	Amkar Perm	Pyatigorsk
18:30 MSK (UTC+3)	Bokov 32'; Teryokhin 57'; Datsenko (yellow card) 60'	Report	Kobenko 1'; Leonchenko (yellow card) 31'; Subašić 39' (yellow card) 40'	Stadium: Central Stadium; Attendance: 4,000; Referee: Mikhail Veselovsky

12 June 2005 11	Rostov	1 – 0	Terek Grozny	Rostov-on-Don
18:00 MSK (UTC+3)	Kanyenda (yellow card) 56'; Kruščić (yellow card) 60'; Osinov 71' (pen.)	Report		Stadium: Olimp-2; Attendance: 6,000; Referee: Mikhail Khodyrev

18 June 2005 12	Terek Grozny	0 – 1	Dynamo Moscow	Pyatigorsk
19:00 MSK (UTC+3)	Ajinjal (yellow card) 15'; Adamov (yellow card) 73'	Report	Polovinchuk (yellow card) 32'; Derlei (yellow card) 43'; Hanek (yellow card) 50'; Yashin 56'; Ribeiro (yellow card) 73'	Stadium: Central Stadium; Attendance: 5,000; Referee: Alexander Gonchar

25 June 2005 13	Alania Vladikavkaz	1 – 0	Terek Grozny	Vladikavkaz
15:00 MSK (UTC+3)	Grujić (yellow card) 29'; Bazayev 55'	Report		Stadium: Republican Spartak Stadium; Attendance: 12,000; Referee: Aleksei Nikolaev

3 July 2005 14	Lokomotiv Moscow	4 – 0	Terek Grozny	Moscow
18:00 MSK (UTC+3)	Bilyaletdinov 38'; Evseev 42' (pen.); Asatiani 50'; Sychev 70'	Report		Stadium: Lokomotiv Central Stadium; Attendance: 8,962; Referee: Sergey Fursa

9 July 2005 15	Terek Grozny	0 – 1	Tom Tomsk	Pyatigorsk
19:00 MSK (UTC+3)	Teryokhin (yellow card) 73'; Gaisumov (yellow card) 87'	Report	Medvedev 67' (yellow card) 85'	Stadium: Central Stadium; Attendance: 4,000; Referee: Valentin Ivanov

17 July 2005 16	Terek Grozny	1 – 0	CSKA Moscow	Pyatigorsk
19:00 MSK (UTC+3)	Dzhabrailov (yellow card) 24'; Adamov 28'; Ajinjal (yellow card) 52'; Nizhegorodov (yellow card) 70'	Report	Krasić (yellow card) 44'; Olić (yellow card) 77'	Stadium: Central Stadium; Attendance: 8,000; Referee: Alexander Evstigneev

23 July 2005 17	Krylia Sovetov	0 – 1	Terek Grozny	Samara
19:00 MSK (UTC+3)	Leilton (yellow card) 48'; Koroman (yellow card) 80' (red card) 80'	Report	Nizhegorodov (yellow card) 34'; Adamov 75'; Bulatov (yellow card) 83'	Stadium: Metallurg Stadium; Attendance: 16,000; Referee: Alexander Kolobaev

30 July 2005 18	Terek Grozny	0 – 0	Zenit St.Petersburg	Pyatigorsk
19:00 MSK (UTC+3)	Kingston (yellow card) 87'	Report	Škrtel (yellow card) 47'; Kozlov (yellow card) 87'	Stadium: Central Stadium; Attendance: 8,000; Referee: Mikhail Veselovsky

6 August 2005 19	Torpedo Moscow	2 – 1	Terek Grozny	Moscow
18:00 MSK (UTC+3)	Zyryanov (yellow card) 8'; Semshov 70'; Panov 89'; Spahić (yellow card) 90+'	Report	Kingston (yellow card) 12'; Karytska 75'; Mazayev (yellow card) 81'	Stadium: Luzhniki Stadium; Attendance: 5,200; Referee: Alexey Tyumin

21 August 2005 20	Terek Grozny	0 – 1	Shinnik Yaroslavl	Pyatigorsk
19:00 MSK (UTC+3)		Report	Khazov 55'	Stadium: Central Stadium; Attendance: 4,500; Referee: Alexander Gonchar

27 August 2005 21	Saturn	3 – 2	Terek Grozny	Ramenskoye
18:00 MSK (UTC+3)	Parks 29' (yellow card) 89'; Bareiro 71' (pen.); Jolović 86'	Report	Adamov 17', 52' (pen.) (yellow card) 81'; Kingston (yellow card) 35'	Stadium: Saturn Stadium; Attendance: 7,000; Referee: Valentin Ivanov

11 September 2005 22	Terek Grozny	1 – 2	Spartak Moscow	Pyatigorsk
18:00 MSK (UTC+3)	Sırxayev 90'; Gaisumov (yellow card) 90+'	Report	Bystrov 18'; Iencsi 90+'	Stadium: Central Stadium; Attendance: 10,000; Referee: Alexander Evstigneev

17 September 2005 23	Moscow	2 – 1	Terek Grozny	Moscow
14:00 MSK (UTC+3)	Kirichenko 35', 90+'; Movsisyan (yellow card) 61'	Report	Dzhabrailov (yellow card) 40'; Adamov (yellow card) 49'; Koroman 64' (pen.); Kingston (yellow card) 66'; Sharonov (yellow card) 68'; Atangana (yellow card) 90+'	Stadium: Eduard Streltsov Stadium; Attendance: 5,500; Referee: Alexander Gonchar

25 September 2005 24	Terek Grozny	1 – 5	Rubin Kazan	Pyatigorsk
18:00 MSK (UTC+3)	Kingston (yellow card) 25' (yellow-red card) 39'; Atangana 42'	Report	Domínguez 9', 80' (pen.); Čížek (yellow card) 56' (goal) 68'; Kinkladze 63', 72'; Fyodorov (yellow card) 65'	Stadium: Central Stadium; Attendance: 5,000; Referee: Sergey Frantsuzov

2 October 2005 25	Amkar Perm	0 – 0	Terek Grozny	Perm
17:00 MSK (UTC+3)		Report	Dzhabrailov (yellow card) 13'; Adamov (yellow card) 45'; Éder (yellow card) 50'	Stadium: Zvezda Stadium; Attendance: 15,800; Referee: Mikhail Veselovsky

15 October 2005 26	Terek Grozny	2 – 3	Rostov	Pyatigorsk
17:30 MSK (UTC+3)	Adamov 20'; Atangana 70'	Report	Olenikov 8'; Kruščić 14'; Pérez (yellow card) 41'; Buznikin 50'; Kalashnikov (yellow card) 78'	Stadium: Central Stadium; Attendance: 4,000; Referee: Jara Jaroslav

23 October 2005 27	Dynamo Moscow	0 – 1	Terek Grozny	Moscow
16:00 MSK (UTC+3)	Frechaut (yellow card) 54'; Ribeiro (yellow card) 64'; Kolodin (yellow card) 68'; Maniche (yellow card) 69'; Derlei (yellow card) 87'	Report	Pokorn (yellow card) 18'; Ajinjal (yellow card) 69'; Lazič (yellow card) 74'; Adamov 75'; Gaisumov (yellow card) 90'	Stadium: Central Stadium; Attendance: 6,000; Referee: Sergey Lapochkin

30 October 2005 28	Terek Grozny	1 – 2	Alania Vladikavkaz	Pyatigorsk
17:00 MSK (UTC+3)	Adamov (yellow card) 44'; Mazayev 77'	Report	Bazayev 20'; Beqiri (yellow card) 41'; Gogniyev 66'; Grujić (yellow card) 84'	Stadium: Central Stadium; Attendance: 2,000; Referee: Valentin Ivanov

6 November 2005 29	Terek Grozny	0 – 3	Lokomotiv Moscow	Pyatigorsk
14:00 MSK (UTC+3)	Boyko (yellow card) 47'	Report	Bilyaletdinov 16'; Izmailov (yellow card) 61'; Khokhlov 69'; Asatiani 76'	Stadium: Central Stadium; Attendance: 5,000; Referee: Stanislav Sukhina

19 November 2005 30	Tom Tomsk	2 – 0	Terek Grozny	Tomsk
14:00 MSK (UTC+3)	Borzenkov (yellow card) 18'; Vejić (yellow card) 59' (goal) 80'; Bornosuzov 62'; Șișchin (yellow card) 80'	Report	Ediyev (red card) 43'; Sharonov (yellow card) 59'	Stadium: Trud Stadium; Attendance: 13,500; Referee: Sergey Frantsuzov

==== League table ====
Pos	Team	Pld	W	D	L	GF	GA	GD	Pts	Qualification or relegation
12	Amkar Perm	30	7	12	11	25	36	−11	33	
13	Rostov	30	8	7	15	26	41	−15	31	
14	Krylia Sovetov Samara	30	7	8	15	29	44	−15	29	
15	Alania Vladikavkaz (R)	30	5	8	17	27	53	−26	23	Relegation to First Division
16	Terek Grozny (Note: Terek had 6 points deducted for failing to pay transfer fee in time.) (R)	30	5	5	20	20	50	−30	14	Relegation to First Division

Source: RFPL
Rules for classification: 1st points; 2nd matches won; 3rd goal difference; 4th head-to-head (points, matches won, goal difference, goals scored, away goals scored)
(R) Relegated

=== Russian Cup ===
==== 2005–06 ====
6 July 2005 Last 32 1st leg	Terek Grozny	5 – 0	Spartak Nalchik	Pyatigorsk
19:00 MSK (UTC+3)	Adamov 4', 17', 36' (pen.); Fedkov 79'; Mazayev 83'	Report		Stadium: Central Stadium; Attendance: 2,700; Referee: Yuri Baskakov

13 August 2005 Last 32 2nd leg	Spartak Nalchik	1 – 1 (1 – 6 agg.)	Terek Grozny	Nalchik
18:30 MSK (UTC+3)	Fedkov 51' (pen.); Sharonov (yellow card) 87'	Report	Pires 7' (pen.); Kudayev (yellow card) 18'	Stadium: Spartak Stadium; Attendance: 8,000; Referee: Vladimir Vlasov

Round of 16 took place during the 2006 season.

== Squad statistics ==
As of match played 19 November 2005

=== Appearances and goals ===
No.	Pos	Nat	Player	Total		Premier League		Russian Cup		Super Cup	
No.	Pos	Nat	Player	Apps	Goals	Apps	Goals	Apps	Goals	Apps	Goals
1	GK	(Ukraine) UKR	Volodymyr Savchenko	3	0	3	0	0	0	0	0
2	DF	(Russia) RUS	Aleksandr Shmarko	10	0	7+2	0	1	0	0	0
3	DF	(Azerbaijan) AZE	Deni Gaisumov	32	0	28+1	0	1+1	0	1	0
5	DF	(Russia) RUS	Maksim Bokov	16	1	14	1	0+1	0	1	0
6	DF	(Russia) RUS	Gennadiy Nizhegorodov	16	0	11+3	0	1	0	1	0
8	MF	(Azerbaijan) AZE	Narvik Sırxayev	22	1	18+2	1	0+1	0	1	0
9	FW	(Russia) RUS	Andrei Fedkov	25	6	15+7	4	0+2	2	1	0
10	MF	(Russia) RUS	Musa Mazayev	27	2	5+20	1	1	1	0+1	0
13	FW	(Cameroon) CMR	Mvondo Atangana	9	2	5+4	2	0	0	0	0
14	MF	(Turkey) TUR	Tamer Tuna	22	0	13+7	0	2	0	0	0
15	MF	(Russia) RUS	Viktor Bulatov	20	0	17+1	0	2	0	0	0
16	GK	(Russia) RUS	Dmitri Goncharov	9	0	8	0	1	0	0	0
17	MF	(Russia) RUS	Denis Klyuyev	10	0	3+5	0	0+1	0	1	0
18	DF	(Russia) RUS	Timur Dzhabrailov	17	0	12+3	0	2	0	0	0
20	FW	(Russia) RUS	Roman Adamov	21	10	12+6	7	2	3	0+1	0
21	MF	(Russia) RUS	Ruslan Ajinjal	31	0	29	0	1	0	1	0
22	DF	(Russia) RUS	Aleksandr Lipko	23	0	20+1	0	1	0	1	0
26	MF	(Ghana) GHA	Laryea Kingston	11	0	10+1	0	0	0	0	0
27	GK	(Russia) RUS	Ruslan Nigmatullin	21	0	19	0	1	0	1	0
28	DF	(Russia) RUS	Roman Sharonov	24	0	21	0	2	0	1	0
30	FW	(Russia) RUS	Rizvan Sadayev	1	0	0+1	0	0	0	0	0
31	DF	(Russia) RUS	Ismail Ediyev	2	0	2	0	0	0	0	0
36	DF	(Russia) RUS	Ismail Khalinbekov	1	0	0+1	0	0	0	0	0
39	MF	(Russia) RUS	Adlan Katsayev	1	0	0+1	0	0	0	0	0
40	DF	(Russia) RUS	Rizvan Utsiyev	1	0	0+1	0	0	0	0	0
45	FW	(Russia) RUS	Idris Zaynulabidov	1	0	1	0	0	0	0	0
47	MF	(Belarus) BLR	Uladzimir Karytska	24	1	19+3	1	2	0	0	0
49	DF	(Slovenia) SVN	Igor Lazič	4	0	4	0	0	0	0	0
50	DF	(Brazil) BRA	Éder	7	0	6	0	1	0	0	0
55	DF	(Slovenia) SVN	Jalen Pokorn	7	0	6+1	0	0	0	0	0
77	FW	(Serbia and Montenegro) SCG	Ognjen Koroman	6	1	6	1	0	0	0	0
87	MF	(Ukraine) UKR	Serhiy Boyko	2	0	2	0	0	0	0	0
Players away from the club on loan:
Players who appeared for Terek Grozny but left during the season:
4	DF	(Ukraine) UKR	Serhiy Datsenko	5	0	4	0	1	0	0	0
7	MF	(Turkmenistan) TKM	Dmitri Khomukha	3	0	1+1	0	0	0	1	0
11	FW	(Russia) RUS	Oleg Teryokhin	13	2	8+5	2	0	0	0	0
24	FW	(Russia) RUS	Aleksandr Shirko	3	0	1+2	0	0	0	0	0

=== Goal scorers ===
Place	Position	Nation	Number	Name	Premier League	Russian Cup	Super Cup	Total
1	FW	(Russia)	20	Roman Adamov	7	3	0	10
2	FW	(Russia)	9	Andrei Fedkov	4	2	0	6
3	FW	(Russia)	11	Oleg Teryokhin	2	0	0	2
3	FW	(Cameroon)	13	Mvondo Atangana	2	0	0	2
3	MF	(Russia)	10	Musa Mazayev	1	1	0	2
6	DF	(Russia)	5	Maksim Bokov	1	0	0	1
6	MF	(Belarus)	47	Uladzimir Karytska	1	0	0	1
6	MF	(Azerbaijan)	8	Narvik Sırxayev	1	0	0	1
6	FW	(Serbia and Montenegro)	77	Ognjen Koroman	1	0	0	1
Total					20	6	0	26

=== Clean sheets ===
Place	Position	Nation	Number	Name	Premier League	Russian Cup	Super Cup	Total
1	GK	(Russia)	27	Ruslan Nigmatullin	4	0	0	4
1	GK	(Russia)	16	Dmitri Goncharov	3	1	0	4
3	GK	(Ukraine)	1	Volodymyr Savchenko	1	0	0	1
Total					8	1	0	9

=== Disciplinary record ===
Number	Nation	Position	Name	Premier League		Russian Cup		Super Cup		Total	
Number	Nation	Position	Name	Booked	Sent off (straight red)	Booked	Sent off (straight red)	Booked	Sent off (straight red)	Booked	Sent off (straight red)
2	(Russia)	DF	Aleksandr Shmarko	1	0	0	0	0	0	1	0
3	(Azerbaijan)	DF	Deni Gaisumov	3	0	0	0	0	0	3	0
5	(Russia)	DF	Maksim Bokov	2	0	0	0	0	0	2	0
6	(Russia)	DF	Gennadiy Nizhegorodov	4	0	0	0	0	0	4	0
8	(Azerbaijan)	MF	Narvik Sırxayev	1	0	0	0	0	0	1	0
9	(Russia)	FW	Andrei Fedkov	2	0	0	0	0	0	2	0
10	(Russia)	MF	Musa Mazayev	1	0	0	0	0	0	1	0
13	(Cameroon)	FW	Mvondo Atangana	1	0	0	0	0	0	1	0
15	(Russia)	MF	Viktor Bulatov	2	0	0	0	0	0	2	0
17	(Russia)	MF	Denis Klyuyev	1	0	0	0	0	0	1	0
18	(Russia)	DF	Timur Dzhabrailov	3	0	0	0	0	0	3	0
20	(Russia)	FW	Roman Adamov	6	0	0	0	0	0	6	0
21	(Russia)	MF	Ruslan Ajinjal	5	0	0	0	0	0	5	0
22	(Russia)	DF	Aleksandr Lipko	1	0	0	0	0	0	1	0
26	(Ghana)	MF	Laryea Kingston	6	1	0	0	0	0	6	1
28	(Russia)	DF	Roman Sharonov	2	0	1	0	0	0	3	0
31	(Russia)	DF	Ismail Ediyev	0	1	0	0	0	0	0	1
49	(Slovenia)	DF	Igor Lazič	1	0	0	0	0	0	1	0
50	(Brazil)	DF	Éder	1	0	0	0	0	0	1	0
55	(Slovenia)	DF	Jalen Pokorn	1	0	0	0	0	0	1	0
87	(Ukraine)	MF	Serhiy Boyko	1	0	0	0	0	0	1	0
Players away on loan:
Players who left Terek Grozny during the season:
4	(Ukraine)	DF	Serhiy Datsenko	2	0	0	0	0	0	2	0
11	(Russia)	FW	Oleg Teryokhin	2	0	0	0	0	0	2	0
Total				50	2	1	0	0	0	51	2
