= Mazayev =

Mazayev (Russian: Маза́ев; masculine) or Mazayeva (Маза́ева; feminine) is a Russian surname. Variants of this surname include Mazaev/Mazaeva, Masajew/Masajewa and Masaev/Masaeva. The following people share this surname:

- Musa Mazayev (born 1977), former Russian footballer
- Sergey Mazayev (born 1959), Russian singer
