= Andrey Medyansky =

Russian footballer and manager

Personal information
- Full name: Andrey Leonidovich Medyansky
- Date of birth: January 14, 1963 (age 63)
- Positions: Defender; midfielder

Team information
- Current team: FC Nika Moscow (manager)

Senior career*
Years	Team	Apps	(Gls)
1980–1982	FC Pakhtakor Tashkent	18	(0)
1983–1984	FC Zvezda Dzhizak	64	(2)
1988	FC Metallurg Almalyk	23	(4)
1990–1991	FC Kimegar Almalyk	79	(9)
1999	FC Krasnoznamensk (D4)		

Managerial career
- 2006: FC Nika Moscow (administrator)
- 2007–2008: FC Nika Moscow
- 2010: FC Nika Moscow (assistant)
- 2010–: FC Nika Moscow
- * Club domestic league appearances and goals

Andrey Leonidovich Medyansky (Russian: Андре́й Леони́дович Медя́нский; born 14 January 1963) is a Russian professional association football manager and a former player currently managing FC Nika Moscow.

As a player, he played two seasons in the Soviet Top League for FC Pakhtakor Tashkent.
