= Firsov =

Firsov (Russian: Фирсов) is a Russian masculine surname, its feminine counterpart is Firsova. It may refer to

- Alissa Firsova (born 1986), Russian-British classical composer, pianist and conductor
- Anatoli Firsov (1941–2000), Russian ice hockey player
- Elena Firsova (born 1950), Russian composer
- Ivan Firsov (c.1733–1785), Russian painter
- Oleg Firsov (1915–1998), Russian physicist
- Olga Firsova (born 1976), Russian basketball player
- Philip Firsov (born 1985), British painter and sculptor
- Vadim Firsov (born 1978), Russian football player

== See also ==
- Firsov (crater) on the far side of the Moon
