= Aristarkhov =

Aristarkhov (Russian: Аристархов) is a Russian masculine surname, its feminine counterpart is Aristarkhova. It may refer to

- Maksim Aristarkhov (born 1980), Russian football player
- Natalya Aristarkhova (born 1989), Russian middle-distance runner
