= Sergei Kurdyukov =

Russian footballer

Personal information
- Full name: Sergei Vasilyevich Kurdyukov
- Date of birth: 3 September 1982 (age 44)
- Place of birth: Tambov, Russian SFSR
- Height: 1.87 m (6 ft 1 1/2 in)
- Positions: Defender; midfielder

Senior career*
Years	Team	Apps	(Gls)
2001	FC Nika Moscow	24	(0)
2002	FC Lokomotiv Liski	33	(0)
2003–2005	FC Spartak Tambov	70	(0)
2006–2007	FC Terek Grozny	17	(0)
2008	FC Avangard Podolsk (D4)		
2009	FC Metallurg Lipetsk	8	(0)
2009	FC Podolye Podolsky district (D4)		
2010	FC Dynamo Stavropol	7	(0)
2010	FC Olimp Michurinsk (D4)		
2011	FC Spartak Tambov	14	(1)
2011–2012	FC Zenit Penza	12	(0)
2013	FC Tambov	18	(0)
- * Club domestic league appearances and goals

Sergei Vasilyevich Kurdyukov (Russian: Серге́й Васильевич Курдюков; born 3 September 1982) is a former Russian professional football player.

== Club career ==
He made his Russian Football National League debut for FC Terek Grozny on 26 March 2006 in a game against FC Angusht Nazran.
