= Nazar Petrosyan =

Personal information
- Full name: Nazar Samvelovich Petrosyan
- Date of birth: 6 June 1951 (age 75)
- Place of birth: Mary, Turkmen SSR
- Positions: Midfielder; striker

Youth career
- Yerevan Republican School

Senior career*
Years	Team	Apps	(Gls)
1969–1977	FC Ararat Yerevan		
1978–1980	CSKA Moscow		
1981	FC Kuban Krasnodar		
1982–1984	FC Ararat Yerevan		
1990	FC Kotayk Abovian		

International career
1976–1977	USSR	3	(0)

Managerial career
- ?: Armenia U-21
- ?: PFC CSKA Moscow (director)
- ?: Russia (director)
- ?: FC Saturn Moscow Oblast (director)
- 1986–1989: FC Kotayk Abovian (director)
- 1989–1990: FC Kotayk Abovyan
- 1997–1998: FC Torpedo Moscow (president)
- 2005–2007: FC Nika Moscow (president)
- 2009–: FC Nika Moscow (president)
- * Club domestic league appearances and goals

Nazar Samvelovich Petrosyan (Russian: Назар Самвелович Петросян; born 6 June 1951 in Mary, Turkmenistan) is a Russian football coach and a retired Soviet football player.

He is of Armenian descent. Currently, he is the president of FC Nika Moscow.

== Honours ==
- Soviet Top League winner: 1973.
- Soviet Cup winner: 1973, 1975.

== International career ==
Petrosyan made his debut for USSR on 28 November 1976 in a friendly against Argentina.
