= Mikhail Rekudanov =

Russian footballer

Personal information
- Full name: Mikhail Sergeyevich Rekudanov
- Date of birth: 5 May 1985 (age 41)
- Place of birth: Moscow, Russian SFSR
- Height: 1.90 m (6 ft 3 in)
- Position: Defender

Youth career
- Podshipnik Moscow

Senior career*
| Years | Team | Apps | (Gls) |
| 2004 | FC Saturn Ramenskoye | 0 | (0) |
| 2005 | FC Nika Moscow | 22 | (1) |
| 2005 | FC Luch-Energiya Vladivostok | 1 | (0) |
| 2006 | FC Terek Grozny | 5 | (0) |
| 2006–2007 | FC Nika Moscow | 44 | (1) |
| 2008 | FC Lukhovitsy | 25 | (0) |
| 2009–2010 | FC Istra | 34 | (1) |
| 2010 | → FC Torpedo Moscow (loan) | 26 | (2) |
| 2011 | FC Khimki | 0 | (0) |
| 2011 | FC Istra | 8 | (0) |
| 2012 | FC Metallurg-Oskol Stary Oskol | 21 | (0) |
- * Club domestic league appearances and goals

Mikhail Sergeyevich Rekudanov (Russian: Михаил Серге́евич Рекуданов; born 5 May 1985) is a former Russian professional football player.

== Club career ==
He made his Russian Football National League debut for FC Luch-Energiya Vladivostok on 6 November 2005 in a game against FC Sokol Saratov.

== Criminal conviction ==
In June 2013, the Moscow police announced that he is wanted for murder. On 4 December 2013 he was convicted of murder and sentenced to 6 years of imprisonment. According to the court, on 23 May 2013 Rekudanov stabbed a Kyrgyzstan citizen 6 times in a mass brawl on the street while under the influence of alcohol. The sentence was reduced as the victim initiated the fight. He was released on parole in 2018.
