= Stanislav Kozyrev =

Russian footballer

Personal information
- Full name: Stanislav Sergeyevich Kozyrev
- Date of birth: 22 March 1987 (age 39)
- Place of birth: Oryol, Russian SFSR
- Height: 1.84 m (6 ft 0 in)
- Position: Goalkeeper

Senior career*
Years	Team	Apps	(Gls)
2004	FC Saturn Ramenskoye	0	(0)
2005	FC Nika Moscow	28	(0)
2006	FC Terek Grozny	9	(0)
2006	FC Nika Moscow	16	(0)
2007	FK Vėtra	17	(0)
2008	FC Kuban Krasnodar	2	(0)
2009	FC Nika Moscow	22	(0)
2010	FC Khimki	3	(0)
2011–2013	FC Dnepr Smolensk	50	(0)
2013	FC Oryol	16	(0)
2014–2015	FC Dynamo Bryansk	18	(0)
2015–2016	FC Oryol	20	(0)
2016–2018	FC Avangard Kursk	24	(0)

International career
2004	Russia U18		
- * Club domestic league appearances and goals

Stanislav Sergeyevich Kozyrev (Russian: Станислав Серге́евич Козырев; born 22 March 1987) is a Russian former professional footballer.

== Club career ==
He made his Russian Football National League debut for FC Terek Grozny on 26 March 2006 in a game against FC Angusht Nazran.
