= Mvondo Atangana =

Cameroonian footballer

Personal information
- Full name: Simon Pierre Mvondo Atangana
- Date of birth: 10 July 1979 (age 47)
- Place of birth: Yaoundé, Cameroon
- Height: 1.75 m (5 ft 9 in)
- Position: Forward

Senior career*
| Years | Team | Apps | (Gls) |
| 1996–1998 | Olympic Mvolyé | | |
| 1998–1999 | Al-Fateh | | |
| 1999–2000 | Tonnerre Yaoundé | | |
| 2000–2002 | Dundee United | 11 | (0) |
| 2002 | → Port Vale (loan) | 2 | (0) |
| 2002–2003 | Colchester United | 6 | (0) |
| 2003 | Grays Athletic | | |
| 2003–2004 | Halstead Town | 19 | (10) |
| 2004 | Luch-Energiya | 37 | (11) |
| 2005 | Lokomotiv Minsk | 10 | (5) |
| 2005–2006 | Terek Grozny | 40 | (7) |
| 2010–2011 | CO Saint-Dizier | | |
| Total | | 125 | (33) |

International career
| 2000 | Cameroon | 1 | (0) |
- * Club domestic league appearances and goals

Simon Pierre Mvondo Atangana (born 10 July 1979) is a Cameroonian former footballer who played as a forward for many clubs across multiple countries. His career began in native Cameroon, playing for Olympic Mvolyé and Tonnerre Yaoundé with a spell in Saudi Arabia with Al-Fateh separating the two stints. He earned a move to Scotland, signing for Dundee United in 2000. He went out on loan to English club Port Vale in 2002. Upon leaving Dundee United, Atangana joined Colchester United before moving to English non-League clubs Grays Athletic and Halstead Town. He later played in Eastern Europe for Luch-Energiya and Terek Grozny in Russia and Lokomotiv Minsk in Belarus. He retired in 2006, returning from retirement in 2010 to play for French club CO Saint-Dizier.

Atanga received one cap for Cameroon at international level and also played for the Cameroon under-21 team.

== Club career ==
Born in Yaoundé, Atangana began his career with Olympic Mvolyé in 1996, spending three seasons with the club. He joined Al-Fateh in 1998, returning to Cameroon in 1999 to join Tonnerre Yaoundé. During his time with Tonnerre Yaoundé, Atangana was called up to the Cameroon national team which led to interest from abroad.

In August 2000, Atangana joined Scottish team Dundee United on a long-term deal, joining up with countryman Alphonse Tchami after impressing manager Alex Smith in a trial. He made 11 league appearances for Dundee United during the 2000–01 season but was transfer listed in May 2001 after failing to make the first-team in eight months.

Atangana suffered a bout of malaria during pre-season for the 2001–02 season, recovering to earn a loan move to English club Port Vale in January 2002. However, his stay with the Valiants was cut short with a hamstring injury, pulling up after just 37 minutes of a game against Wycombe Wanderers, and having only played 45 minutes previously. In April 2002, Dundee United released Atangana after just twelve appearances in all competitions.

Following his Dundee United exit, Atangana returned to England to join Colchester United in November 2002 on a weekly contract. He suffered another hamstring injury that left him out for one month in a match against Peterborough United on 26 December, following scoring seven goals in seven reserve team matches.

In the summer of 2003, he was released by Colchester after being told he would not be offered a long-term contract, having made just six league appearances. He joined non-League Grays Athletic and scored the only goal in a 1–0 win over Chesham United on his debut. He later joined Halstead Town, scoring ten goals in 19 appearances for the club. While playing for Halstead, he went on trial with clubs in France and made a 3,200-mile round trip to Turkey for a trial with İstanbulspor.

Atangana eventually joined Russian club Luch-Energiya in 2004, making 37 appearances and scoring 11 goals, before joining Belarusian side Lokomotiv Minsk. He scored a ten-minute hat-trick against BATE Borisov in June 2005 and scored five goals in ten appearances in total. He later returned to Russia with Terek Grozny, scoring seven goals in 40 appearances, before retiring from the game in 2006.

In 2010, Atangana came out of retirement to play for the French amateur club CO Saint-Dizier before calling time on his career once again in 2011.

== International career ==
After making some appearances for the Cameroon under-21 side, Atangana made one full international appearance on 23 April 2000, coming off the bench to replace Pius Ndiefi after 51 minutes in a 3–0 2002 World Cup qualifying win over Somalia at Stade Ahmadou Ahidjo.

Atangana was in contention to play for Cameroon at the 2000 Summer Olympics in Sydney, Australia, but instead opted to concentrate on his club career with Dundee United. Cameroon went on to take the gold medal.

== Career statistics ==
Appearances and goals by club, season and competition
| Club | Season | League | | | National cup (Note: Includes Scottish Cup, FA Cup, Russian Cup, Belarusian Cup) | | League cup (Note: Includes Scottish League Cup, Football League Cup) | | Total | |
| Club | Season | Division | Apps | Goals | Apps | Goals | Apps | Goals | Apps | Goals |
|---|---|---|---|---|---|---|---|---|---|---|
| Dundee United | 2000–01 | Scottish Premier League | 11 | 0 | 0 | 0 | 1 | 0 | 12 | 0 |
| Dundee United | 2001–02 | Scottish Premier League | 0 | 0 | 0 | 0 | 0 | 0 | 0 | 0 |
| Dundee United | Total | | 11 | 0 | 0 | 0 | 1 | 0 | 12 | 0 |
| Port Vale (loan) | 2001–02 | Second Division | 2 | 0 | 0 | 0 | 0 | 0 | 2 | 0 |
| Colchester United | 2002–03 | Second Division | 6 | 0 | 1 | 0 | 0 | 0 | 7 | 0 |
| Halstead Town | 2003–04 | Essex Senior League | 19 | 10 | | | – | | 19 | 10 |
| Luch-Energiya | 2004 | Russian First Division | 37 | 11 | | | – | | 37 | 11 |
| Lokomotiv Minsk | 2005 | Belarusian Premier League | 10 | 5 | | | – | | 10 | 5 |
| Terek Grozny | 2005 | Russian Premier League | 9 | 2 | 0 | 0 | – | | 9 | 2 |
| Terek Grozny | 2006 | Russian First Division | 31 | 5 | 3 | 1 | – | | 34 | 6 |
| Terek Grozny | Total | | 40 | 7 | 3 | 1 | 0 | 0 | 43 | 8 |
| Career total | | | 125 | 33 | 4 | 1 | 1 | 0 | 130 | 34 |
