= Marat Ksanayev =

Russian footballer

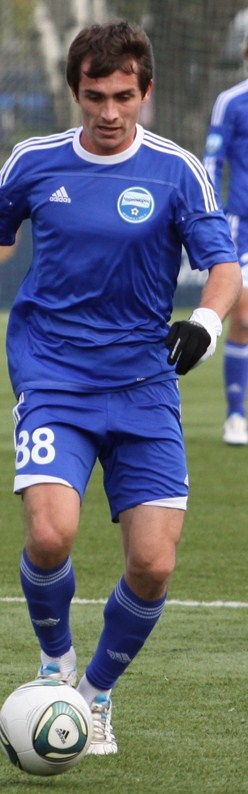

Personal information
- Full name: Marat Nazhmudinovich Ksanayev
- Date of birth: 5 March 1981 (age 45)
- Height: 1.81 m (5 ft 11 1/2 in)
- Position: Midfielder

Senior career*
Years	Team	Apps	(Gls)
2000–2004	PFC Spartak-2 Nalchik		
2001–2005	PFC Spartak Nalchik	70	(2)
2006	FC Volgar-Gazprom Astrakhan	19	(2)
2007–2008	FC Chernomorets Novorossiysk	53	(2)
2009	FC Atyrau	2	(0)
2009–2011	FC Chernomorets Novorossiysk	74	(5)
2012	PFC Spartak Nalchik	0	(0)
2013	FC Logovaz Babugent		
- * Club domestic league appearances and goals

Marat Nazhmudinovich Ksanayev (Russian: Марат Нажмудинович Ксанаев; born 5 March 1981) is a former Russian professional footballer.

== Club career ==
He played 9 seasons in the Russian Football National League for PFC Spartak Nalchik, FC Volgar-Gazprom Astrakhan and FC Chernomorets Novorossiysk.
