= Alex Braz =

Brazilian footballer (born 1984)

Personal information
- Full name: Alex Braz da Silva
- Date of birth: 14 September 1984 (age 42)
- Place of birth: São Paulo, Brazil
- Height: 1.80 m (5 ft 11 in)
- Position: Defender

Senior career*
Years	Team	Apps	(Gls)
2004–2005	Nacional		
2006	Terek Grozny	15	(0)
2007	Marília		
2008	Londrina		
2008	Nacional		
2009	Ceará		
2009	Mesquita	5	(0)
2008	América		
2010	Rio Claro	0	(0)
2010	Boa Esporte	5	(0)
2011	Rio Preto	14	(0)
2012	Taboão da Serra	3	(0)
2012	Universitatea Cluj	2	(0)
- * Club domestic league appearances and goals as of 18:01, 7 June 2019 (UTC) ‡ National team caps and goals as of 18:01, 7 June 2019 (UTC)

Alex Braz da Silva (born 14 September 1984) is a former Brazilian professional football player who played as a defender.

== Career ==
Alex Braz ended his career playing in the Romanian top division Liga I for Universitatea Cluj.
