= Igor Voznesensky =

Russian footballer

Personal information
- Full name: Igor Yuryevich Voznesensky
- Date of birth: 28 May 1985 (age 41)
- Place of birth: Oryol, Russian SFSR, Soviet Union
- Height: 1.76 m (5 ft 9 1/2 in)
- Positions: Midfielder; forward

Youth career
- SDYuSShOR-3 Oryol
- FC Lokomotiv Moscow

Senior career*
| Years | Team | Apps | (Gls) |
| 2002–2004 | FC Lokomotiv Moscow | 0 | (0) |
| 2005 | FC Oryol | 7 | (0) |
| 2006 | FC Khimki | 31 | (4) |
| 2007 | FC Shinnik Yaroslavl | 14 | (1) |
| 2008 | FC Rusichi Oryol | 24 | (1) |
| 2009 | FC Kaisar | 6 | (0) |
| 2009 | FC Tyumen | 10 | (2) |
| 2010–2011 | FC Rusichi Oryol | 49 | (8) |
| 2012 | FC Avangard Kursk | 8 | (0) |
| 2012–2013 | FC Oryol | 12 | (1) |
| 2013–2014 | FC Dynamo Bryansk | 13 | (0) |
| 2014–2016 | FC Oryol | 65 | (5) |
- * Club domestic league appearances and goals

Igor Yuryevich Voznesensky (Russian: И́горь Ю́рьевич Вознесе́нский; born 28 May 1985) is a former professional association football player from Russia.

== Club career ==
He played for the main squad of FC Lokomotiv Moscow in the Russian Premier League Cup.

He played 3 seasons in the Russian Football National League for FC Oryol, FC Khimki and FC Shinnik Yaroslavl.
