= Anouk Aimee Takam Kenmoe =

Cameroonian footballer

Anuk Takam
Personal information
- Full name: Anouk Aimee Takam Kenmoe
- Date of birth: June 21, 1979 (age 47)
- Place of birth: Douala, Cameroon
- Height: 1.83 m (6 ft 0 in)
- Position: Forward

Team information
- Current team: Olympique Beja

Senior career*
Years	Team	Apps	(Gls)
1999	FC Sodovik Sterlitamak	19	(1)
2000–2002	Karlsruher SC	22	(0)
2003	FC Kuban Krasnodar	0	(0)
2004	FC Chernomorets Novorossiysk	17	(0)
2005	FC Sokol Saratov	7	(0)
2006	FC Kuban Krasnodar	0	(0)
2006 – 2007	FC Baltika Kaliningrad	40	(0)
2008	FC SKA Rostov-on-Don	28	(0)
2009	FC Metallurg Lipetsk	13	(0)
2010–	Olympique Beja		
- * Club domestic league appearances and goals as of 17:44, 2 July 2009 (UTC)

Anouk Aimee Takam Kenmoe (born June 21, 1979 in Douala) is a Cameroonian professional footballer, who currently plays for Olympique Beja.

== Career ==
He was released by FC Metallurg Lipetsk on July 2, 2009.
