= Viktor Tolstykh =

Russian footballer

Personal information
- Full name: Viktor Sergeyevich Tolstykh
- Date of birth: 17 May 1985 (age 41)
- Height: 1.70 m (5 ft 7 in)
- Position: Defender

Senior career*
Years	Team	Apps	(Gls)
2002–2008	FC Dynamo Bryansk	140	(9)
2009	FC Spartak Tambov	4	(0)
2009–2010	FC Dynamo Bryansk	23	(1)
2010–2012	FC Neftekhimik Nizhnekamsk	30	(0)
2012	FC Chernomorets Novorossiysk	11	(0)
2013–2016	FC Dynamo Bryansk	55	(4)
- * Club domestic league appearances and goals

Viktor Sergeyevich Tolstykh (Russian: Виктор Серге́евич Толстых; born 17 May 1985) is a Russian former professional football player.

== Club career ==
He played 6 seasons in the Russian Football National League for FC Dynamo Bryansk.
