= Denis Spirin =

Russian footballer

Personal information
- Full name: Denis Sergeyevich Spirin
- Date of birth: 2 January 1980 (age 46)
- Place of birth: Mineralnye Vody, Russian SFSR
- Height: 1.85 m (6 ft 1 in)
- Position: Defender

Youth career
- FC Uralan Elista

Senior career*
Years	Team	Apps	(Gls)
1997–1999	FC Uralan-d Elista (amateur)		
2000	FC Uralan Elista	9	(0)
2001–2007	FC Baltika Kaliningrad	200	(6)
2008	FC Volgar-Gazprom-2 Astrakhan	10	(0)
2008	FC Dynamo Bryansk	20	(1)
2009–2010	FC Neman		
2010	FC LUKoil Kaliningrad		
2011–2012	FC Elbrus Bolshoye Isakovo		

Managerial career
- 2011: FC Baltika Kaliningrad (academy)
- * Club domestic league appearances and goals

Denis Sergeyevich Spirin (Russian: Денис Сергеевич Спирин; born 2 January 1980 in Mineralnye Vody) is a former Russian football player.
