= Maksim Panin =

Russian footballer

Personal information
- Full name: Maksim Valeryevich Panin
- Date of birth: 8 June 1981 (age 45)
- Place of birth: Oryol, Russian SFSR
- Height: 1.75 m (5 ft 9 in)
- Positions: Midfielder; defender

Senior career*
Years	Team	Apps	(Gls)
1999–2005	FC Oryol	160	(7)
2006	FC Avangard Kursk	36	(5)
2007–2008	FC Zvezda Irkutsk	59	(4)
2009	FC Metallurg Lipetsk	15	(2)
2010	FC Avangard Kursk	26	(1)
2011	FC Salyut Belgorod	22	(0)
2012–2013	FC Oryol	20	(1)
- * Club domestic league appearances and goals

Maksim Valeryevich Panin (Russian: Максим Валерьевич Панин; born 8 June 1981) is a former Russian professional football player.

== Club career ==
He played 7 seasons in the Russian Football National League for 4 different clubs.
