= Serhiy Boyko (footballer, born 1987) =

Ukrainian footballer (born 1987)

Personal information
- Full name: Serhiy Oleksandrovich Boyko
- Date of birth: 6 August 1987 (age 39)
- Height: 1.81 m (5 ft 11 1/2 in)
- Positions: Defender; midfielder

Youth career
- DVUFK Dnipropetrovsk

Senior career*
Years	Team	Apps	(Gls)
2003–2004	FC Dnipro-2 Dnipropetrovsk	1	(0)
2004–2005	FC Dnipro Dnipropetrovsk	0	(0)
2005	FC Terek Grozny	2	(0)
2006–2007	FC Helios Kharkiv	19	(0)
2007	FC Ros Bila Tserkva	6	(0)
2007–2008	FC Zimbru Chișinău	8	(0)
2009–2011	FC Krymteplytsia Molodizhne	36	(0)
2011–2013	FC Hoverla Uzhhorod	1	(0)
- * Club domestic league appearances and goals

Serhiy Oleksandrovich Boyko (Ukrainian: Сергій Олександрович Бойко; born 6 August 1987) is a former Ukrainian football player.
