= Yegor Kryshtafovich =

Russian footballer

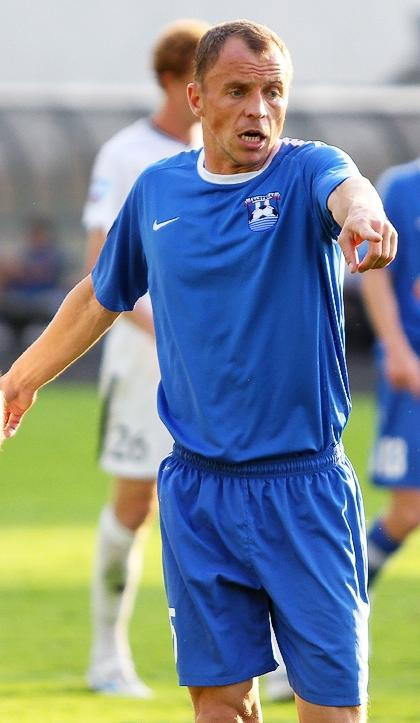

Personal information
- Full name: Yegor Nikolayevich Kryshtafovich
- Date of birth: 17 October 1980 (age 46)
- Height: 1.83 m (6 ft 0 in)
- Position: Defender

Senior career*
Years	Team	Apps	(Gls)
1996	FC Baltika Kaliningrad	0	(0)
1997–1998	FC Atlantik Svetly		
1998	FC Baltika Kaliningrad	0	(0)
1998	FC BakBes Kaliningrad		
1999–2000	FC Volna Kaliningrad	9	(6)
2000	Atletas-Inkaras Kaunas	11	(0)
2000	FC Atlantik Svetly		
2001–2002	FC Baltika-Tarko Kaliningrad (amateur)		
2002	FC Baltika-Plus-Master Kaliningrad		
2003	FC Volochanin-Ratmir Vyshny Volochyok	32	(4)
2004–2013	FC Baltika Kaliningrad	216	(10)
2013	FC Tosno	3	(0)
- * Club domestic league appearances and goals

Yegor Nikolayevich Kryshtafovich (Russian: Егор Николаевич Крыштафович; born 17 October 1980) is a Russian former professional footballer.

== Club career ==
He played 7 seasons in the Russian Football National League for FC Baltika Kaliningrad.
