= Vladimir Shipilov =

Russian footballer

Personal information
- Full name: Vladimir Viktorovich Shipilov
- Date of birth: 5 December 1972 (age 53)
- Place of birth: Tikhoretsk, Russian SFSR
- Height: 1.76 m (5 ft 9 1/2 in)
- Position: Midfielder

Senior career*
Years	Team	Apps	(Gls)
1990–1996	FC Druzhba Maykop	146	(10)
1997–1998	FC Dynamo Stavropol	75	(7)
1999	FC Arsenal Tula	11	(0)
2000–2001	FC Kristall Smolensk	49	(2)
2001	FC Kuban Krasnodar	12	(0)
2002–2003	FC Terek Grozny	77	(9)
2004	FC Sokol Saratov	21	(1)
2004	FC Terek Grozny	16	(2)
2005	FC Sokol Saratov	29	(2)
2006	FC Volgar-Gazprom Astrakhan	40	(6)
2007–2008	FC Chernomorets Novorossiysk	60	(16)
2009	FC Kaisar	22	(0)
- * Club domestic league appearances and goals

Vladimir Viktorovich Shipilov (Russian: Владимир Викторович Шипилов; born 5 December 1972) is a former Russian professional footballer.

== Club career ==
He made his Russian Football National League debut for FC Druzhba Maykop on 28 April 1992 in a game against FC Asmaral Kislovodsk.

He played 3 games in the 2004–05 UEFA Cup qualification rounds for FC Terek Grozny.

== Honours ==
- Russian Cup winner: 2004.
