= Ismail Khalinbekov =

Russian footballer

Personal information
- Full name: Ismail Magomedovich Khalinbekov
- Date of birth: 3 September 1985 (age 41)
- Height: 1.83 m (6 ft 0 in)
- Position: Defender

Team information
- Current team: FC Pobeda Khasavyurt (assistant coach)

Senior career*
Years	Team	Apps	(Gls)
2003	FC Khasavyurt		
2004	FC Anzhi-Khazar Makhachkala (amateur)		
2005	FC Terek Grozny	1	(0)
2006	FC Dynamo Makhachkala	7	(0)
2006–2007	Shahdag Qusar FK	11	(0)
2007	FC Lokomotiv-KMV Mineralnye Vody (amateur)		
2008–2009	FC Biolog Novokubansk (amateur)		
2009	FC Lider Kurchaloy		
2010	FC Biolog Novokubansk (amateur)		
2011–2012	FC Elektroavtomatika Stavropol		

Managerial career
- 2023: FC Pobeda Khasavyurt
- 2023–: FC Pobeda Khasavyurt (assistant)
- * Club domestic league appearances and goals

Ismail Magomedovich Khalinbekov (Russian: Исмаил Магомедович Халинбеков; born 3 September 1985) is a Russian football coach and a former player. He is an assistant coach for FC Pobeda Khasavyurt.
