= Pavel Dyakonov =

Russian footballer

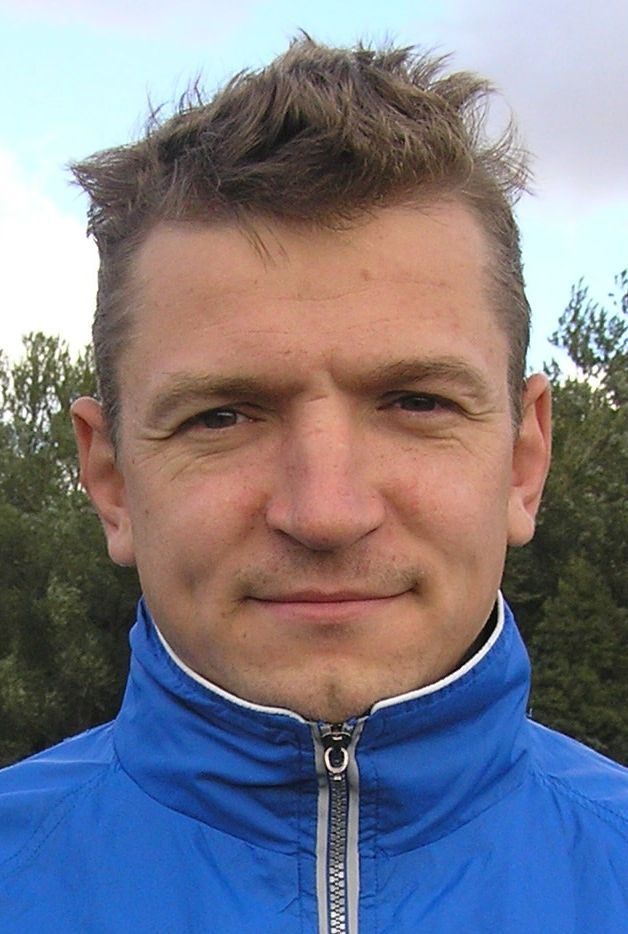

Personal information
- Full name: Pavel Markovich Dyakonov
- Date of birth: 16 March 1973 (age 53)
- Place of birth: Leningrad, Russian SFSR
- Height: 1.85 m (6 ft 1 in)
- Position: Goalkeeper

Senior career*
Years	Team	Apps	(Gls)
1991–1992	FC Kirovets St. Petersburg	34	(0)
1993–1994	FC Lokomotiv St. Petersburg	58	(0)
1995	FC Dynamo St. Petersburg	24	(0)
1996–2000	FC Lokomotiv Chita	150	(0)
2001	FC Arsenal Tula	33	(0)
2002–2003	FC Dynamo-SPb St. Petersburg	52	(0)
2004	FC Uralan Elista	11	(0)
2004–2005	FC Tom Tomsk	20	(0)
2006	FC Fakel Voronezh	29	(0)
2007	FC Zvezda Irkutsk	12	(0)
2007	FC Dynamo St. Petersburg	10	(0)
2008	FC Dynamo-Voronezh Voronezh	28	(0)
2009	FC Sakhalin Yuzhno-Sakhalinsk	26	(0)
- * Club domestic league appearances and goals

Pavel Markovich Dyakonov (Russian: Павел Маркович Дьяконов; born 16 March 1973) is a former Russian professional footballer.

== Club career ==
He made his debut in the Russian Premier League in 2005 for FC Tom Tomsk.
