= Igor Lazič =

Slovenian footballer

Personal information
- Date of birth: 30 October 1979 (age 47)
- Place of birth: Ljubljana, SFR Yugoslavia
- Height: 1.84 m (6 ft 0 in)
- Position: Defender

Senior career*
Years	Team	Apps	(Gls)
2000–2002	Ljubljana	56	(0)
2002–2004	Olimpija	41	(0)
2004–2005	Celje	16	(0)
2005	Terek Grozny	4	(0)
2005–2007	Koper	37	(0)
2007–2009	Interblock	32	(0)
2009	Olimpija Ljubljana	8	(0)
2010	Šenčur	13	(0)
2011	Nafta Lendava	5	(0)
2011	Bela Krajina	9	(0)
2012	FC Hermagor	13	(0)
2013	SK Maria Saal	14	(0)
2014–2015	Bled	18	(0)
2015	SV Greifenburg	15	(0)
2016	SG Drautal	9	(0)

International career
2004–2007	Slovenia	2	(0)
- * Club domestic league appearances and goals

Igor Lazič (born 30 October 1979) is a Slovenian retired football defender.

He has been capped twice by the Slovenian national team, against Italy in 2004 and Montenegro in 2007.
