= Andrei Malay =

Russian footballer and coach

Andrey Malay
Personal information
- Full name: Andrey Vladimirovich Malay
- Date of birth: 13 March 1973 (age 53)
- Place of birth: Zelenodolsk, Ukrainian SSR
- Height: 1.78 m (5 ft 10 in)
- Position: Defender

Youth career
- OShISP Dnipropetrovsk

Senior career*
Years	Team	Apps	(Gls)
1991	FC Dnipro Dnipropetrovsk (reserves)		
1992–1997	FC Baltika Kaliningrad	196	(3)
1998–2002	FC Torpedo Moscow	125	(0)
2003–2005	FC Saturn Ramenskoye	33	(0)
2006	FC Sodovik Sterlitamak	12	(0)
2006	FC Terek Grozny	11	(0)

Managerial career
- 2008: Torpedo Moscow (reserves)
- 2009–2010: Torpedo-ZIL Moscow (coach)
- 2009: Torpedo-ZIL Moscow (caretaker)
- 2012: FC Ufa (assistant)
- 2012: FC Dzhileks Klimovsk
- 2015: FC UOR #5 Yegoryevsk
- * Club domestic league appearances and goals

Andrey Vladimirovich Malay (Russian: Андрей Владимирович Малай; born 13 March 1973) is a Russian professional football coach and a former player.

== Club career ==
He made his professional debut in the Russian Second Division in 1992 for FC Baltika Kaliningrad.

== Honours ==
- Russian Premier League bronze: 2000.

== European club competitions ==
With FC Torpedo Moscow.

- UEFA Cup 2000–01: 1 game.
- UEFA Cup 2001–02: 2 games.
