= Elbrus Zurayev =

Russian footballer (born 1982)

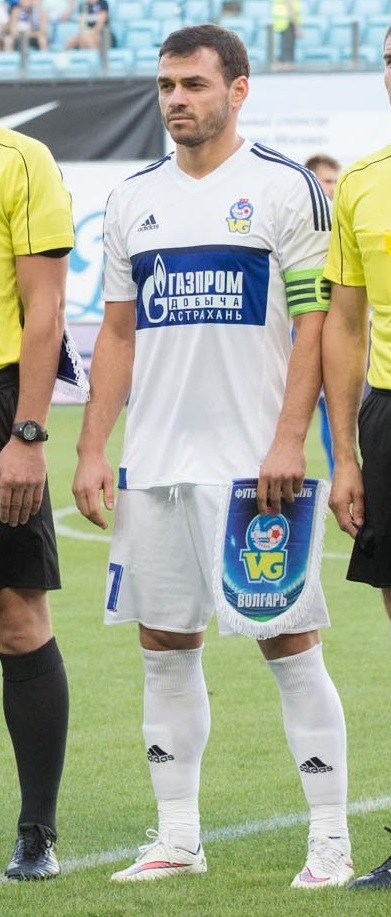
- Zurayev with Volgar in 2016

Personal information
- Full name: Elbrus Savkuyevich Zurayev
- Date of birth: 12 May 1982 (age 44)
- Place of birth: Ordzhonikidze, Russian SFSR
- Height: 1.75 m (5 ft 9 in)
- Positions: Defender; midfielder

Senior career*
Years	Team	Apps	(Gls)
2000–2002	FC Avtodor Vladikavkaz	83	(4)
2003	FC Spartak-Alania Vladikavkaz	4	(0)
2004–2007	FC KAMAZ Naberezhnye Chelny	80	(0)
2008–2009	FC Kuban Krasnodar	28	(0)
2010–2012	FC Torpedo Moscow	70	(1)
2012–2014	FC SKA-Energiya Khabarovsk	34	(0)
2014–2017	FC Volgar Astrakhan	40	(0)
2018–2019	FC Spartak Vladikavkaz	9	(0)
2019–2021	FC Alania Vladikavkaz	10	(0)
- * Club domestic league appearances and goals

Elbrus Savkuyevich Zurayev (Russian: Эльбрус Савкуйевич Зураев; born 12 May 1982) is a Russian former football player.

== Club career ==
He made his Russian Premier League debut for FC Alania Vladikavkaz on 6 April 2003 in a game against FC Rotor Volgograd.
