= Eduard Kobozev =

Russian footballer

Personal information
- Full name: Eduard Ivanovich Kobozev
- Date of birth: 13 September 1979 (age 47)
- Height: 1.72 m (5 ft 8 in)
- Positions: Midfielder; forward

Youth career
- FC Kvant Obninsk

Senior career*
| Years | Team | Apps | (Gls) |
| 1996 | FC Obninsk | 12 | (0) |
| 1997 | FC Industriya Borovsk | 19 | (4) |
| 1997–1998 | FC Gazovik-Gazprom Izhevsk | 3 | (0) |
| 1998 | FC Dynamo Izhevsk | 31 | (3) |
| 1999–2001 | FC Gazovik-Gazprom Izhevsk | 98 | (7) |
| 2002 | FC Lokomotiv Moscow | 0 | (0) |
| 2002 | FC Volgar-Gazprom Astrakhan | 17 | (0) |
| 2003 | FC Gazovik-Gazprom Izhevsk | 34 | (2) |
| 2004 | FC Metallurg-Kuzbass Novokuznetsk | 31 | (1) |
| 2005–2006 | FC KAMAZ Naberezhnye Chelny | 32 | (3) |
| 2006 | FC Terek Grozny | 15 | (0) |
| 2007–2010 | FC SOYUZ-Gazprom Izhevsk | 98 | (7) |
| 2011 | FC Metallurg-Kuzbass Novokuznetsk | 4 | (1) |
| 2011–2012 | FC Zenit-Izhevsk | 15 | (0) |
- * Club domestic league appearances and goals

Eduard Ivanovich Kobozev (Russian: Эдуард Иванович Кобозев; born 13 September 1979) is a former Russian professional football player.

== Club career ==
He made his Russian Football National League debut for FC Gazovik-Gazprom Izhevsk on 2 June 1997 in a game against FC Lokomotiv Chita.
