= Leonid Kudayev =

Russian footballer

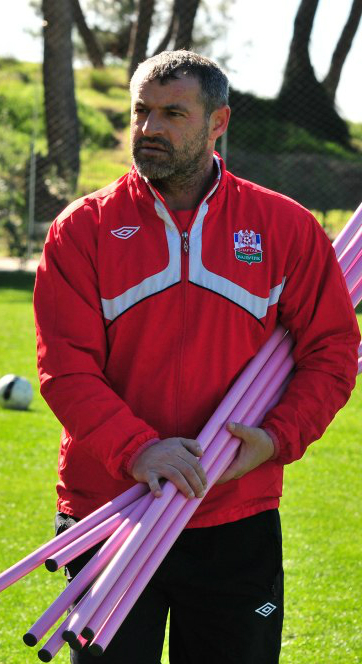
- Leonid Kudayev

Personal information
- Full name: Leonid Mukharbiyevich Kudayev
- Date of birth: 29 April 1971 (age 55)
- Height: 1.72 m (5 ft 7 1/2 in)
- Position: Defender

Senior career*
Years	Team	Apps	(Gls)
1992–1993	FC More Feodosia	11	(1)
1992–1997	FC Avtozapchast Baksan	176	(20)
1998–2006	PFC Spartak Nalchik	238	(9)

Managerial career
- 2007: PFC Spartak Nalchik (reserves administrator)
- 2008–2017: PFC Spartak Nalchik (administrator)
- * Club domestic league appearances and goals

Leonid Mukharbiyevich Kudayev (Russian: Леонид Мухарбиевич Кудаев; 29 April 1971 – 31 March 2026) was a Russian professional football player.
