= Aleksandr Kovalyov (footballer, born 1982) =

Russian footballer

Personal information
- Full name: Aleksandr Sergeyevich Kovalyov
- Date of birth: 21 February 1982 (age 44)
- Height: 1.96 m (6 ft 5 in)
- Position: Defender

Senior career*
Years	Team	Apps	(Gls)
1999–2000	PFC CSKA-2 Moscow	46	(0)
2001	PFC CSKA Moscow	0	(0)
2002	FC Oryol	21	(0)
2003	FC Titan Moscow	7	(0)
2005	FC Zhenis	11	(0)
2006	FC Dynamo Bryansk	19	(0)
2006	FC Spartak Nizhny Novgorod	7	(0)
2007	FC Dynamo Bryansk	19	(0)
2008–2009	FC SKA-Energiya Khabarovsk	2	(0)
2010–2011	FC Dynamo Barnaul	28	(0)
2012–2013	FC Dolgoprudny	31	(0)
- * Club domestic league appearances and goals

Aleksandr Sergeyevich Kovalyov (Russian: Александр Серге́евич Ковалёв; born 21 February 1982) is a former Russian professional footballer.

== Club career ==
He played 3 seasons in the Russian Football National League for FC Dynamo Bryansk, FC Spartak Nizhny Novgorod and FC SKA-Energiya Khabarovsk.
