= Nikolai Samoylov =

Russian footballer

Personal information
- Full name: Nikolai Aleksandrovich Samoylov
- Date of birth: 3 January 1980 (age 46)
- Height: 1.80 m (5 ft 11 in)
- Position: Defender

Youth career
- FC Rotor Volgograd

Senior career*
Years	Team	Apps	(Gls)
2000–2001	FC Rotor Volgograd	18	(0)
2002–2003	FC Volgar-Gazprom Astrakhan	12	(0)
2003	FC Rotor Volgograd	1	(0)
2004	FC Sodovik Sterlitamak	20	(0)
2005	FC Mordovia Saransk	25	(0)
2006–2009	FC Sibir Novosibirsk	104	(1)
2010	FC Ural Sverdlovsk Oblast	12	(0)
2010–2012	Volgar-Gazprom	49	(1)

International career
2000–2001	Russia U-21	4	(0)
- * Club domestic league appearances and goals

Nikolai Aleksandrovich Samoylov (Russian: Николай Александрович Самойлов; born 3 January 1980) is a Russian former professional footballer.

== Club career ==
He made his debut in the Russian Premier League in 2000 for FC Rotor Volgograd.
