= Yevgeni Ivanov (footballer) =

Russian footballer

Personal information
- Full name: Yevgeni Yuryevich Ivanov
- Date of birth: 24 August 1979 (age 47)
- Height: 1.86 m (6 ft 1 in)
- Position: Midfielder

Senior career*
| Years | Team | Apps | (Gls) |
| 1997–1999 | FC Lokomotiv Kaluga | 90 | (10) |
| 1999–2000 | FC Krylia Sovetov Samara | 23 | (4) |
| 2000 | FC Krylia Sovetov-2 Samara | 2 | (0) |
| 2000–2001 | Apollon Limassol | 23 | (9) |
| 2002 | FC Volgar-Gazprom Astrakhan | 18 | (2) |
| 2003 | FC Dynamo-SPb St. Petersburg | 9 | (0) |
| 2003–2004 | Onisilos Sotira | 12 | (1) |
| 2005 | FC Ryazan-Agrokomplekt Ryazan | 20 | (1) |
| 2006 | FC Terek Grozny | 5 | (0) |
| 2007 | FC Metallurg-Kuzbass Novokuznetsk | 13 | (2) |
| 2008 | FC Dynamo Bryansk | 13 | (1) |
| 2008–2009 | FC MiK Kaluga (D4) | | |
| 2010–2011 | FC Kaluga | 38 | (2) |
- * Club domestic league appearances and goals

Yevgeni Yuryevich Ivanov (Russian: Евгений Юрьевич Иванов; born 24 August 1979) is a former Russian professional football player.
