= Anton Zhukov (footballer, born 1982) =

Russian footballer

Personal information
- Full name: Anton Anatolyevich Zhukov
- Date of birth: 8 July 1982 (age 44)
- Place of birth: Tikhvin, Leningrad Oblast, Russian SFSR
- Height: 1.85 m (6 ft 1 in)
- Position: Defender

Youth career
- DYuSSh Tikhvin
- FC Zenit Saint Petersburg

Senior career*
Years	Team	Apps	(Gls)
2000	FC Svetogorets Svetogorsk (amateur)		
2001–2002	FC Svetogorets Svetogorsk	64	(3)
2003	FC Dynamo-SPb St. Petersburg	27	(0)
2004	FC Luch-Energiya Vladivostok	12	(0)
2005–2006	FC Anzhi Makhachkala	73	(1)
2007	FC Ural Yekaterinburg	8	(0)
2007	FC Mordovia Saransk	11	(1)
2008	FC Dynamo-Voronezh Voronezh	30	(1)
2009	FC Smena-Zenit St. Petersburg	15	(0)
2010–2012	FC Metallurg Lipetsk	34	(0)
- * Club domestic league appearances and goals

Anton Anatolyevich Zhukov (Russian: Антон Анатольевич Жуков; born 8 July 1982) is a former Russian professional football player.

== Club career ==
He made his Russian Football National League debut for FC Dynamo Saint Petersburg on 27 May 2003 in a game against FC Lada Tolyatti. He played 5 seasons in the FNL for 5 clubs.
