= Nail Magzhanov =

Russian footballer

Personal information
- Full name: Nail Munirovich Magzhanov
- Date of birth: 29 July 1980 (age 46)
- Place of birth: Astrakhan, Russian SFSR
- Height: 1.76 m (5 ft 9 1/2 in)
- Positions: Midfielder; defender

Team information
- Current team: FC Volgar Astrakhan (assistant coach)

Senior career*
Years	Team	Apps	(Gls)
1998	FC Volgar-Gazprom Astrakhan	2	(0)
1999–2000	FC Sudostroitel Astrakhan	35	(6)
2001	FC Volgar-Gazprom Astrakhan	3	(0)
2001	FC Sudostroitel Astrakhan	19	(13)
2002	FC Titan Reutov	37	(4)
2003	FC Volgar-Gazprom Astrakhan	12	(0)
2003	FC Alnas Almetyevsk	17	(7)
2004–2006	FC Volgar-Gazprom Astrakhan	87	(30)
2007	FC Rotor Volgograd	11	(1)
2007–2010	FC Volgar-Gazprom Astrakhan	84	(13)
2011	FC Sokol Saratov	11	(2)
2011–2012	FC Sakhalin Yuzhno-Sakhalinsk	9	(0)

Managerial career
- 2018–: FC Volgar Astrakhan (assistant)
- * Club domestic league appearances and goals

Nail Munirovich Magzhanov (Russian: Наиль Мунирович Магжанов; born 29 July 1980) is a Russian professional football coach and a former player. He is an assistant coach with FC Volgar Astrakhan.

== Club career ==
He played 6 seasons in the Russian Football National League for FC Volgar Astrakhan.

== Honours ==
- Russian Second Division Zone South best midfielder: 2004.
