= Samuel Didier Biang =

Cameroonian footballer and coach

Samuel Biang
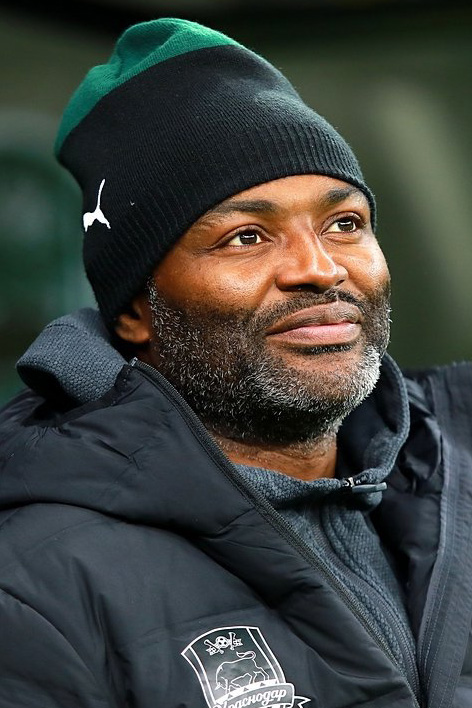
- Biang in 2018

Personal information
- Full name: Samuel Didier Biang
- Date of birth: 23 May 1974 (age 52)
- Place of birth: Koutaba, Cameroon
- Height: 1.79 m (5 ft 10 1/2 in)
- Position: Forward

Team information
- Current team: FC Krasnodar (academy coach)

Senior career*
Years	Team	Apps	(Gls)
1997–1998	FC Torpedo-GAZ Krasnodar		
1999	FC Izumrud-Neftyanik Timashyovsk		
1999	FC Slavyansk Slavyansk-na-Kubani	15	(4)
2000	FC MZhK Krasnodar		
2000–2001	FC Nemkom Krasnodar (amateur)		
2001–2002	FC Metallurg Krasnoyarsk	40	(9)
2003–2004	FC Kuban Krasnodar	37	(13)
2005	FC Dynamo Makhachkala	15	(4)
2005	FC Amur Blagoveshchensk	19	(7)
2006	FC Baltika Kaliningrad	14	(2)
2007	FC Dynamo Krasnodar		
2008	FC Spartak Gelendzhik		
2009	FC Dynamo Krasnodar		

Managerial career
- 2012–: FC Krasnodar (academy)
- * Club domestic league appearances and goals

Samuel Didier Biang (Russian: Самюэль Дидье Бианг; born 23 May 1974 in Koutaba) is a Cameroonian football coach and a former player. He works as a coach with the FC Krasnodar academy. He also holds Russian citizenship, and he spent the whole of his playing career in Russia. He never played on the organized level during his youth years and started playing for his university squad when he was receiving his education in computer science at the Kuban State University. Local coaches advised him to start a professional career as a football player in 1998.
