= Igor Strelbin =

Russian footballer (1974–2018)

Personal information
- Full name: Igor Sergeyevich Strelbin
- Date of birth: 16 September 1974
- Place of birth: Bryansk, Russian SFSR
- Date of death: 3 January 2018 (aged 43)
- Height: 1.85 m (6 ft 1 in)
- Positions: Midfielder; defender

Senior career*
Years	Team	Apps	(Gls)
1992–1998	FC Dynamo Bryansk	190	(3)
1999	FC Spartak-Peresvet Bryansk	24	(1)
2000	FC Krasnoznamensk	14	(0)
2004	FC Yassi	25	(0)
2005–2006	FC Dynamo Makhachkala	47	(0)
2007	FC Mashuk-KMV Pyatigorsk	3	(0)
2007	FC Atyrau	8	(1)
2008	FC Sever Murmansk	13	(0)
2010–2011	FC Zenit Penza	30	(0)
Total		354	(5)
- * Club domestic league appearances and goals

Igor Sergeyevich Strelbin (Russian: Игорь Серге́евич Стрельбин; 16 September 1974 – 3 January 2018) was a Russian professional footballer. He died on 3 January 2018 at the age of 43 after a serious illness.

== Club career ==
He played 3 seasons in the Russian Football National League for FC Dynamo Makhachkala and FC Mashuk-KMV Pyatigorsk.
