= Viktor Bukiyevsky =

Russian footballer

Personal information
- Full name: Viktor Viktorovich Bukiyevsky
- Date of birth: 15 June 1979 (age 47)
- Height: 1.90 m (6 ft 3 in)
- Position: Defender

Senior career*
Years	Team	Apps	(Gls)
1998–2000	FC Spartak-2 Moscow	78	(8)
2000–2001	FC Saturn Ramenskoye	8	(0)
2002–2004	FC Arsenal Tula	100	(16)
2005	FC Oryol	40	(8)
2006–2007	FC Avangard Kursk	72	(17)
2008	FC Zvezda Irkutsk	10	(0)
2008	FC Metallurg-Kuzbass Novokuznetsk	15	(2)
2009	FC Dnepr Smolensk	16	(2)
2009	FC Nosta Novotroitsk	13	(0)
- * Club domestic league appearances and goals as of 17:19, 10 November 2010 (UTC)

Viktor Viktorovich Bukiyevsky (Russian: Виктор Викторович Букиевский; born 15 June 1979) is a former Russian professional footballer. He made his debut in the Russian Premier League in 2000 for FC Saturn Ramenskoye.

== Personal life ==
His younger brother Pyotr Bukiyevsky was also a footballer. His father, also named Viktor Bukiyevsky, played for FC Spartak Moscow.
