= Yevgeni Kachan =

Russian footballer (born 1983)

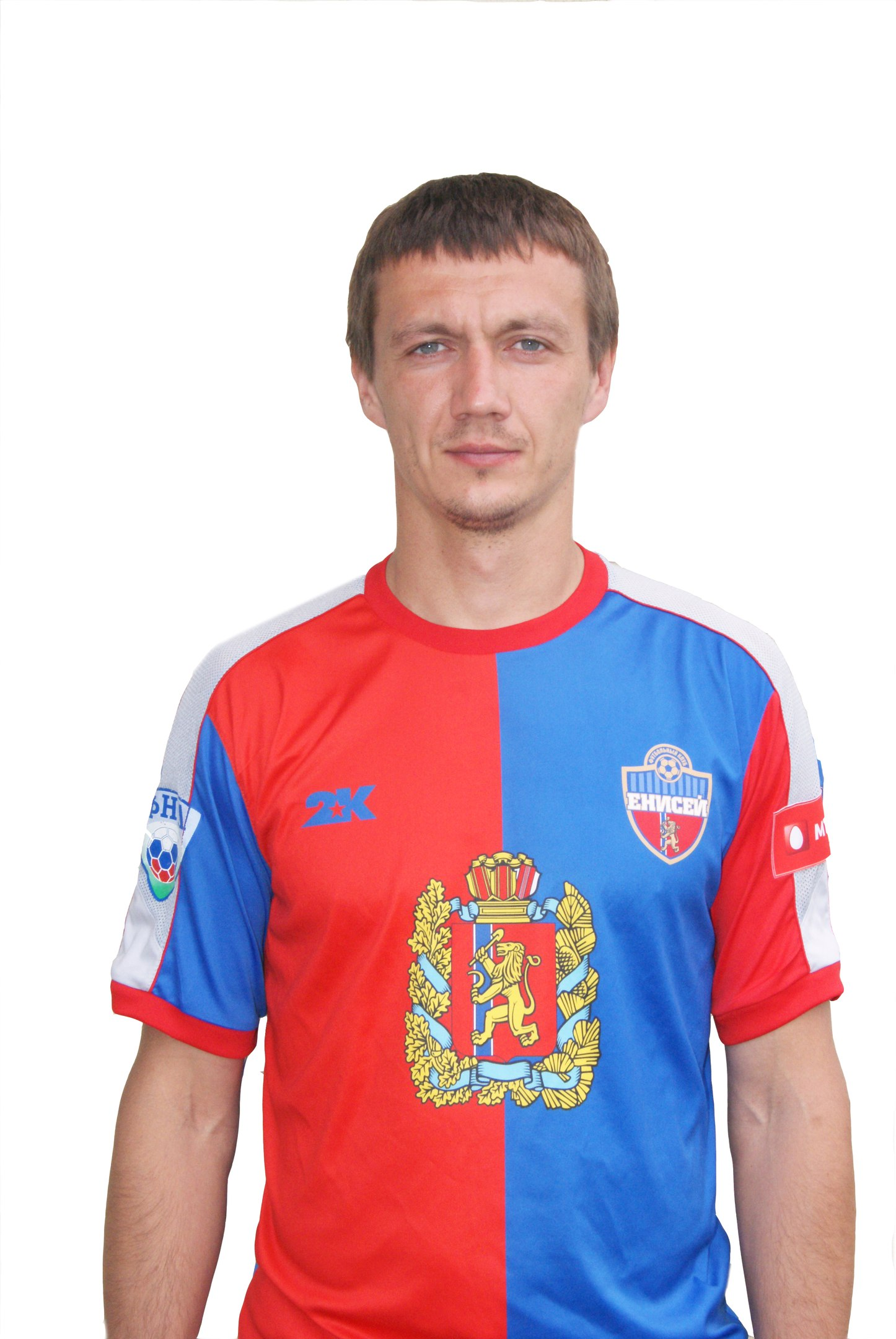

Personal information
- Full name: Yevgeni Mikhailovich Kachan
- Date of birth: 22 March 1983 (age 43)
- Place of birth: Krasnoyarsk, Russian SFSR
- Height: 1.87 m (6 ft 2 in)
- Position: Defender

Senior career*
Years	Team	Apps	(Gls)
2000	FC Metallurg Krasnoyarsk	0	(0)
2001	FC Chkalovets-Olimpik Novosibirsk	7	(0)
2002–2007	FC Metallurg Krasnoyarsk	140	(15)
2008–2010	FC KAMAZ Naberezhnye Chelny	23	(1)
2009	→ FC Fakel Voronezh (loan)	16	(1)
2009	→ FC Metallurg Lipetsk (loan)	9	(0)
2010–2016	FC Yenisey Krasnoyarsk	163	(10)
2016–2017	FC Sibir Novosibirsk	28	(1)
2017–2018	FC Syzran-2003	15	(1)
2018–2019	FC Volga Ulyanovsk	16	(1)
- * Club domestic league appearances and goals

Yevgeni Mikhailovich Kachan (Russian: Евгений Михайлович Качан; born 22 March 1983) is a Russian former professional football player.

== Club career ==
He played 10 seasons in the Russian Football National League for 4 different clubs.
