= Igor Zakharov (footballer, born 1975) =

Russian footballer

Personal information
- Full name: Igor Vyacheslavovich Zakharov
- Date of birth: 5 November 1975 (age 50)
- Place of birth: Oryol, Russian SFSR
- Height: 1.82 m (5 ft 11 1/2 in)
- Position: Midfielder

Youth career
- SDYuShOR-3 Oryol

Senior career*
| Years | Team | Apps | (Gls) |
| 1993–1999 | FC Oryol | 163 | (8) |
| 1999–2001 | FC Fakel Voronezh | 19 | (1) |
| 2001 | FC Tom Tomsk | 8 | (0) |
| 2002 | FC Fakel Voronezh | 25 | (0) |
| 2003–2007 | FC Salyut-Energia Belgorod | 119 | (1) |
| 2007 | FC Gubkin | 16 | (0) |
| 2008 | FC Rusichi Oryol | 11 | (1) |
- * Club domestic league appearances and goals

Igor Vyacheslavovich Zakharov (Russian: Игорь Вячеславович Захаров; born 5 November 1975) is a former Russian football player.

== Club career ==
He made his Russian Premier League debut for FC Fakel Voronezh on 1 April 2000 in a game against FC Alania Vladikavkaz.
