= Central Stadium (Pyatigorsk) =

Sports venue in Pyatigorsk, Russia

Tsentral'ny Stadium
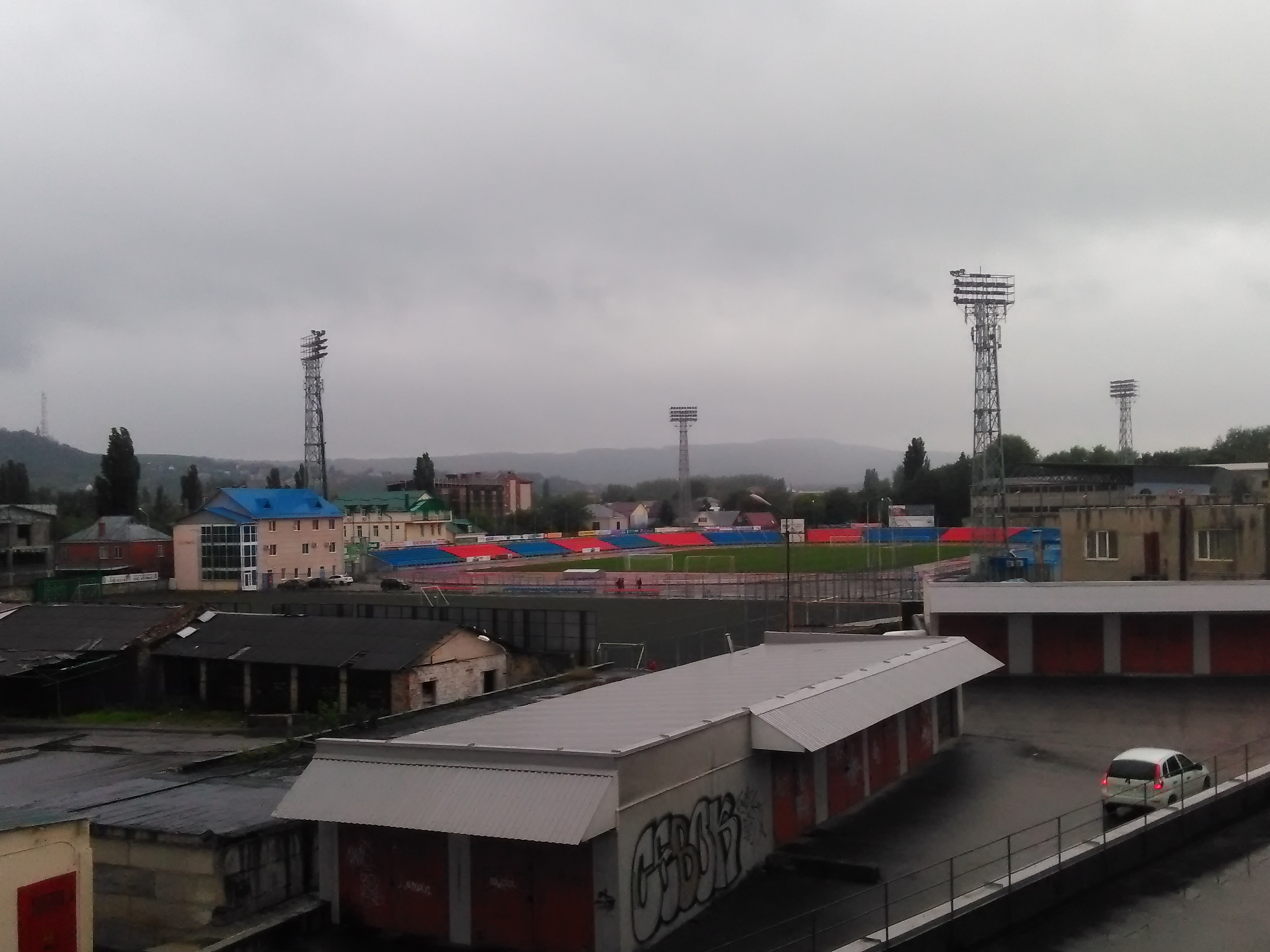
- Interactive map of Tsentral'ny Stadium
- Former names: Trud Stadium (until 2001)
- Location: Pyatigorsk, Russia
- Coordinates: 44°01′51.99″N 43°03′50.91″E
- Capacity: 10300 - 12500
- Surface: grass
- Field size: 104×68

Construction
- Opened: 1966

Tenants
- FC Mashuk-KMV Pyatigorsk (1966–present), FC Terek Grozny (2004–2007)

Tsentral'ny Stadium is a multi-purpose stadium in Pyatigorsk, Russia. Built in 1966, it was called Trud Stadium until 2001. It is currently used mostly for football matches. It is the home stadium of FC Mashuk-KMV Pyatigorsk. From 2004 until 2007 it was the home stadium of FC Terek Grozny. The stadium can accommodate up to 10,365 spectators.

== See also ==
- Trud (Russian newspaper)
