= Maksim Aristarkhov =

Russian footballer

Personal information
- Full name: Maksim Yuryevich Aristarkhov
- Date of birth: 9 March 1980 (age 46)
- Place of birth: Kaluga, Russian SFSR
- Height: 1.89 m (6 ft 2 1/2 in)
- Position: Forward

Youth career
- FC Torpedo Moscow

Senior career*
Years	Team	Apps	(Gls)
1997–2000	FC Torpedo-2	87	(33)
2000–2003	FC Torpedo Moscow	35	(5)
2003	FC Tom Tomsk	12	(4)
2004	FC Arsenal Kyiv	12	(4)
2004	FC Amkar Perm	5	(0)
2005	FC Anzhi Makhachkala	17	(0)
2005	FC Metalurh Zaporizhya	16	(2)
2006	FC Terek Grozny	18	(5)
2006–2007	FC Zorya Luhansk	2	(0)
2007	FC Nosta Novotroitsk	16	(3)
2008–2009	FC Volga Nizhny Novgorod	56	(10)
2010	FC Metallurg Lipetsk	26	(3)
2011–2012	FC Gubkin	4	(2)
- * Club domestic league appearances and goals

Maksim Yuryevich Aristarkhov (Russian: Максим Юрьевич Аристархов; born 9 March 1980) is a former Russian professional footballer.

== Club career ==
He made his debut in the Russian Premier League in 2000 for FC Torpedo Moscow.

== Honours ==
- Russian Premier League bronze: 2000.
