= Dmitri Goncharov =

Russian footballer

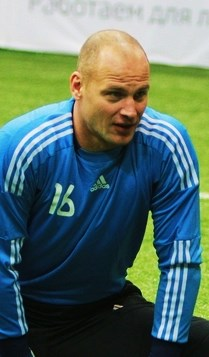
- Dmitry Golubovich, 2014

Personal information
- Full name: Dmitri Sergeyevich Goncharov
- Date of birth: 15 April 1975 (age 51)
- Place of birth: Dresden, East Germany
- Height: 1.86 m (6 ft 1 in)
- Position: Goalkeeper

Youth career
- PFC CSKA Moscow

Senior career*
Years	Team	Apps	(Gls)
1992–1993	PFC CSKA-d Moscow	13	(0)
1994	PFC CSKA-2 Moscow	19	(0)
1995–1997	PFC CSKA-d Moscow	66	(0)
1996	PFC CSKA Moscow	2	(0)
1997	FC CSK VVS-Kristall Smolensk	21	(0)
1998	FC Lokomotiv Nizhny Novgorod	42	(0)
1999	PFC CSKA Moscow	18	(0)
2000–2001	FC Fakel Voronezh	47	(0)
2002	FC Spartak Moscow	6	(0)
2002–2003	FC Alania Vladikavkaz	14	(0)
2004	FC Kuban Krasnodar	6	(0)
2005–2006	FC Terek Grozny	21	(0)

International career
1995–1996	Russia U-21	4	(0)
- * Club domestic league appearances and goals

Dmitri Sergeyevich Goncharov (Russian: Дмитрий Серге́евич Гончаров; born 15 April 1975) is a Russian former professional footballer.

== Club career ==
He made his professional debut in the Russian Second Division in 1992 for PFC CSKA-d Moscow.

== Honours ==
- Russian Premier League bronze: 1999, 2002.

== European club competitions ==
With PFC CSKA Moscow.

- UEFA Cup 1996–97: 1 game.
- UEFA Champions League 1999–2000 qualification: 2 games.
