= Jalen Pokorn =

Slovenian footballer (born 1979)

Personal information
- Date of birth: 7 June 1979 (age 47)
- Place of birth: Kranj, SFR Yugoslavia
- Height: 1.75 m (5 ft 9 in)
- Position: Midfielder

Youth career
- Triglav Kranj

Senior career*
Years	Team	Apps	(Gls)
1998–1999	Triglav Kranj	16	(0)
1999–2004	Olimpija	91	(2)
2004–2005	Hapoel Nazareth Illit	30	(0)
2005–2006	Terek Grozny	25	(0)
2007	Atlantas Klaipėda	13	(0)
2008	Domžale	15	(0)
2008–2009	Celje	22	(1)
2009–2010	Olimpija Ljubljana	30	(0)
2010–2011	Triglav Kranj	26	(0)
2011	Atromitos Yeroskipou	4	(0)
2012–2013	Triglav Kranj	58	(0)
2014	ATUS Guttaring	25	(4)
2015	Ločan		
2015-2016	ATUS Guttaring	24	(8)

International career
1997	Slovenia U18	7	(0)
1998	Slovenia U20	1	(1)
2000–2001	Slovenia U21	13	(0)
2004–2005	Slovenia	12	(0)
- * Club domestic league appearances and goals as of 2 January 2024

Jalen Pokorn (born 7 June 1979) is a Slovenian retired football midfielder.

== International career ==
He has been capped 12 times for the Slovenian national team in 2004 and 2005. His final international was an October 2005 World Cup qualification match away against Italy.

== Honours ==
=== Olimpija ===
- Slovenian Cup: 1999–2000, 2002–03

==== Domžale ====
- Slovenian PrvaLiga: 2007–08
