= Vladimir Leonchenko =

Russian footballer (born 1972)

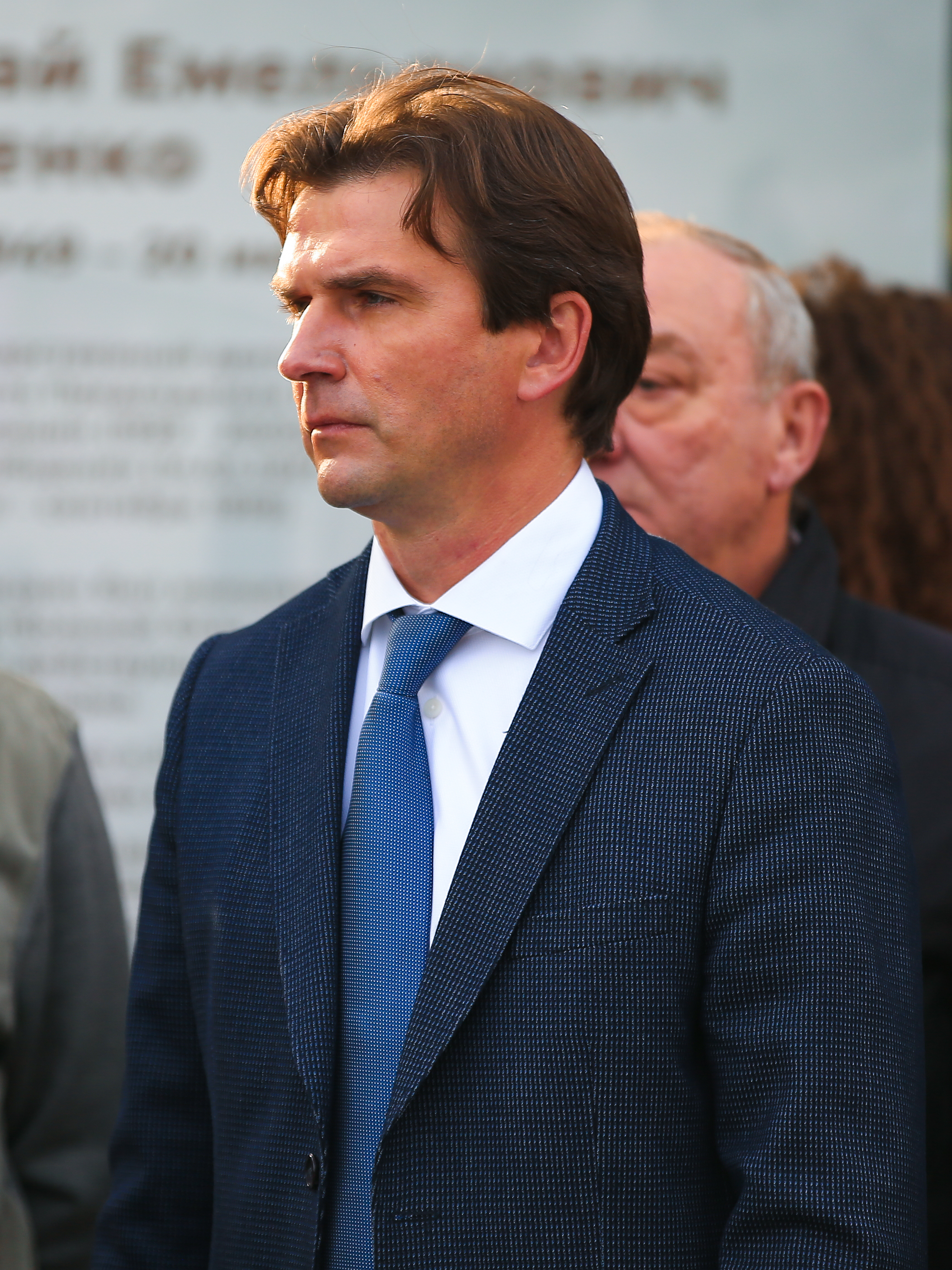

Personal information
- Full name: Vladimir Valeryevich Leonchenko
- Date of birth: 11 April 1972 (age 54)
- Place of birth: Moscow, Russian SFSR, Soviet Union
- Height: 1.83 m (6 ft 0 in)
- Positions: Midfielder; defender

Team information
- Current team: FC Lokomotiv Moscow (CEO)

Youth career
- FC Dynamo Moscow

Senior career*
Years	Team	Apps	(Gls)
1990–1991	FC Dynamo Moscow	0	(0)
1992	FC Dynamo-d Moscow	36	(1)
1993	FC Rostselmash Rostov-on-Don	20	(0)
1994	FC Lokomotiv Moscow	9	(0)
1995–1997	FC Torpedo Moscow	60	(3)
1997–1998	FC Shinnik Yaroslavl	50	(9)
1999–2003	FC Torpedo Moscow	99	(19)
2004–2005	FC Amkar Perm	45	(3)
2006	FC Spartak Vladikavkaz	7	(0)
2006	FC Terek Grozny	16	(3)

Managerial career
- 2019–2020: FC Fakel Voronezh (board member)
- 2021–: FC Lokomotiv Moscow (CEO)
- * Club domestic league appearances and goals

Vladimir Valeryevich Leonchenko (Russian: Владимир Валерьевич Леонченко; born 11 April 1972) is a Russian professional football executive and a former player. He works as the general director (CEO) of FC Lokomotiv Moscow.

== Playing career ==
He made his professional debut in the Russian Second Division in 1992 for FC Dynamo-d Moscow.

== Post-playing career ==
He headed the Russian Professional Football Players and Coaches Union.

== Honours ==
- Russian Premier League bronze: 1994.

== European club competitions ==
- UEFA Cup 1996–97 with FC Torpedo-Luzhniki Moscow: 4 games, 1 own goal.
- UEFA Intertoto Cup 1998 with FC Shinnik Yaroslavl: 4 games, 1 goal.
- UEFA Cup 2000–01 with FC Torpedo Moscow: 1 game.
- UEFA Cup 2001–02 with FC Torpedo Moscow: 2 games.
- UEFA Cup 2003–04 with FC Torpedo Moscow: 5 games, 1 goal.
