= Rizavdi Edilov =

Russian footballer

Personal information
- Full name: Rizavdi Romanovich Edilov
- Date of birth: 26 June 1988 (age 38)
- Height: 1.83 m (6 ft 0 in)
- Position: Goalkeeper

Senior career*
Years	Team	Apps	(Gls)
2005–2012	FC Terek Grozny	8	(0)
- * Club domestic league appearances and goals

Rizavdi Romanovich Edilov (Russian: Ризавди Романович Эдилов; born 26 June 1988) is a former Russian professional footballer.

== Club career ==
He made his professional debut in the Russian First Division in 2006 for FC Terek Grozny.
