= Uladzimir Karytska =

Belarusian footballer (born 1979)

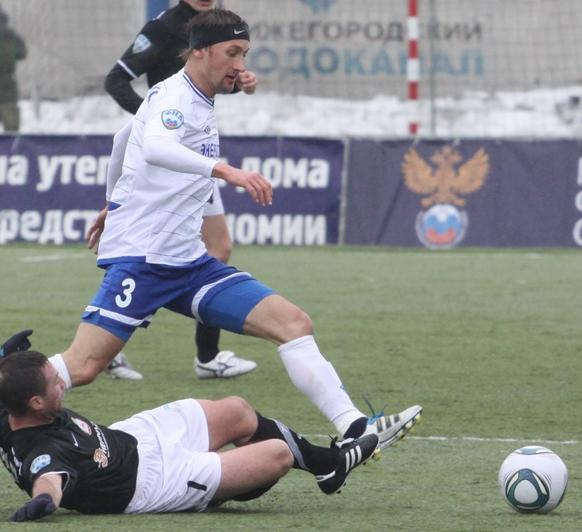
- Karytska with Dynamo Bryansk in 2012

Personal information
- Full name: Uladzimir Mihailavich Karytska
- Date of birth: 6 July 1979 (age 47)
- Place of birth: Molodechno, Soviet Union
- Height: 1.77 m (5 ft 10 in)
- Position: Midfielder

Youth career
- 1998: Molodechno

Senior career*
Years	Team	Apps	(Gls)
1998	Molodechno	8	(0)
1998	→ Zabudova Chist (loan)	20	(2)
1999–2000	Torpedo Minsk	48	(2)
2001	Slavia Mozyr	17	(2)
2001–2002	Ružomberok	5	(0)
2002	Rostselmash Rostov-on-Don	13	(1)
2002	Saturn Ramenskoye	3	(0)
2003	Torpedo-Metalurg Moscow	15	(0)
2004	Alania Vladikavkaz	25	(2)
2005	Terek Grozny	22	(1)
2005–2006	Metalurh Zaporizhya	8	(3)
2006	Terek Grozny	12	(1)
2006–2008	Chornomorets Odesa	55	(17)
2009	Metalurh Donetsk	8	(2)
2010–2011	Shinnik Yaroslavl	60	(12)
2012	Dynamo Bryansk	6	(0)
2012–2015	Shinnik Yaroslavl	62	(15)
2015	→ Arsenal Tula (loan)	8	(1)
2015–2016	Dinamo Minsk	25	(4)
Total		420	(65)

International career
2000–2001	Belarus U21	12	(1)
2002–2012	Belarus	40	(3)

Managerial career
- 2018: Dynamo Moscow (U21 assistant)
- 2018–2019: Dynamo Moscow (U21)
- 2019–2020: Belarus U19
- 2020–2023: Belarus U20
- 2023: Leon Saturn Ramenskoye (assistant)
- 2024–2025: Leon Saturn Ramenskoye
- * Club domestic league appearances and goals

Uladzimir Mihailavich Karytska (Belarusian: Уладзімір Міхайлавіч Карыцька, Russian: Владимир Михайлович Корытько, Vladimir Mikhailovich Korytko; born 6 July 1979) is a Belarusian football coach and a former player.

== Career ==
Karytska became a member of the Belarus national team in 2002. He did not receive call-ups during most of Bernd Stange's tenure as manager of Belarus, but was nominated for a February 2012 friendly match against Moldova by new head coach Georgi Kondratiev, during which he earned his 40th cap.

== Career statistics ==
#	Date	Venue	Opponent	Score	Result	Competition
1	12 November 2005	CSK Vitebsky, Vitebsk, Belarus	Latvia	1 – 1	3–1	Friendly
2	11 November 2006	Dinamo Stadium (Minsk), Belarus	Slovenia	4 – 2	4–2	Euro 2008 qualifier
3	21 November 2007	Dinamo Stadium (Minsk), Belarus	Netherlands	2 – 0	2–1	Euro 2008 qualifier
