= Nazhaddi Ibragimov =

Russian footballer

Personal information
- Full name: Nazhaddi Imaliyevich Ibragimov
- Date of birth: 5 July 1987 (age 39)
- Height: 1.78 m (5 ft 10 in)
- Positions: Defender; midfielder

Senior career*
Years	Team	Apps	(Gls)
2005–2007	FC Terek Grozny	4	(0)
2007	FC Smolensk	14	(0)
2008	FC Terek Grozny	0	(0)
2008	FC Volga Tver	5	(0)
2009	FC Dnepr Smolensk	14	(0)
2010–2011	FC Mashuk-KMV Pyatigorsk	53	(0)
2012	FC Gornyak Uchaly	7	(0)
2012–2013	FC Baltika Kaliningrad	1	(0)
2013	FC Druzhba Maykop	22	(0)
2014	FC Mashuk-KMV Pyatigorsk	9	(0)
2014–2017	FC TSK Simferopol	50	(1)
- * Club domestic league appearances and goals

Nazhaddi Imaliyevich Ibragimov (Russian: Нажадди Ималиевич Ибрагимов; born 5 July 1987) is a former Russian professional football player.

== Club career ==
He made his Russian Football National League debut for FC Terek Grozny on 25 June 2006 in a game against FC Oryol.
