= Rizvan Sadayev =

Russian footballer

Personal information
- Full name: Rizvan Yaralyyevich Sadayev
- Date of birth: 26 August 1979 (age 47)
- Height: 1.69 m (5 ft 6 1/2 in)
- Position: Midfielder

Senior career*
Years	Team	Apps	(Gls)
1999–2000	FC Angusht Nazran	60	(0)
2001–2006	FC Terek Grozny	90	(18)
2003	→ FC Mashuk-KMV Pyatigorsk (loan)	16	(5)
2004	→ FC Mashuk-KMV Pyatigorsk (loan)	10	(3)
2008	FC Kavkaztransgaz-2005 Ryzdvyany	6	(0)
- * Club domestic league appearances and goals

Rizvan Yaralyyevich Sadayev (Russian: Ризван Яралыевич Садаев; born 26 August 1979) is a former Russian football player.
