= Vadim Firsov =

Russian footballer

Personal information
- Full name: Vadim Nikolayevich Firsov
- Date of birth: 22 June 1978 (age 48)
- Place of birth: Moscow, Russian SFSR
- Height: 1.83 m (6 ft 0 in)
- Position: Defender

Senior career*
Years	Team	Apps	(Gls)
1999–2000	FC Krasnoznamensk	30	(2)
2003	FC Znamya Truda Orekhovo-Zuyevo	14	(2)
2003–2004	FC Zirka Kirovohrad	12	(1)
2004–2005	FC Zorya Luhansk	24	(0)
2005–2007	FC Avangard Kursk	39	(4)
2007	FC Zvezda Irkutsk	18	(0)
2008	FC Volga Ulyanovsk	16	(1)
2008–2010	FC Vityaz Podolsk	38	(3)
2009	→ FC Metallurg Lipetsk (loan)	12	(0)
2011	FC Avangard Kursk	0	(0)
- * Club domestic league appearances and goals

Vadim Nikolayevich Firsov (Russian: Вадим Николаевич Фирсов; born 22 June 1978) is a former Russian professional footballer.
