= Idris Zaynulabidov =

Russian footballer

Personal information
- Full name: Idris Ruslanovich Zaynulabidov
- Date of birth: 4 April 1986 (age 40)
- Height: 1.73 m (5 ft 8 in)
- Position: Forward

Senior career*
Years	Team	Apps	(Gls)
2003	FC Khasavyurt		
2005–2006	Terek Grozny	6	(0)
2006	Zvezda Serpukhov	11	(4)
2007	Darida Minsk Raion	6	(0)
2007–2008	Lukhovitsy	31	(7)
2008	Dagdizel Kaspiysk	11	(1)
- * Club domestic league appearances and goals

Idris Ruslanovich Zaynulabidov (Russian: Идрис Русланович Зайнулабидов; born 4 April 1986) is a former Russian football player.
