= Musa Mazayev =

Russian footballer

Personal information
- Full name: Musa Sultanovich Mazayev
- Date of birth: 21 April 1977 (age 49)
- Height: 1.77 m (5 ft 9 1/2 in)
- Position: Midfielder

Senior career*
| Years | Team | Apps | (Gls) |
| 1999–2000 | FC Druzhba Maykop | 49 | (19) |
| 2001–2006 | FC Terek Grozny | 181 | (43) |
| 2008 | FC Druzhba Maykop | 31 | (2) |
| 2009 | FC Angusht Nazran | 30 | (7) |
- * Club domestic league appearances and goals

Musa Sultanovich Mazayev (Russian: Муса Султанович Мазаев; born 21 April 1977) is a former Russian professional footballer.

== Club career ==
He made his debut in the Russian Premier League in 2005 for FC Terek Grozny, and played 4 games in the UEFA Cup 2004–05 for them.

== Honours ==
- Russian Cup winner: 2004.
- Russian Second Division Zone South top scorer: 2002 (26 goals).
