= FC Nika Moscow =

- Full name: Football Club Nika Moscow
- Founded: 1999
- Ground: Nika Stadium
- Capacity: 2,990
- Chairman: Nazar Petrosyants
- Manager: (Russia) Dmitri Galiamin
- Coach: (Russia) Dmitri Kharine
- League: Amateur Football League, Zone Moscow
- 2010: Russian Second Division; Zone Centre, 16th
Home colours	Away colours

FC Nika Moscow (Russian: ФК «Ника» Москва) is a Russian association football club from Moscow, founded in 1999. It played professionally in the Russian Second Division in 2001 and from 2005 to 2010. Currently it plays in the Amateur Football League.
