= 2012–13 in Russian football =

Football in Russia
- Season: 2012–13

Men's football
- Premier League: CSKA Moscow
- First Division: Ural Sverdlovsk Oblast
- Second Division: Khimik Dzerzhinsk (West); Arsenal Tula (Center); Angusht Nazran (South); Gazovik Orenburg (Ural-Povolzhye); Luch-Energiya (East)
- Russian Cup: CSKA Moscow
- Super Cup: Rubin Kazan

The following is a summary of the 2012–13 season of competitive football in Russia.

== Promotion and relegation ==
League	Promoted Teams	Relegated Teams
Premier League	Ural Sverdlovsk Oblast; Tom Tomsk	Mordovia Saransk; Alania Vladikavkaz
National Football League	Khimik Dzerzhinsk (West); Arsenal Tula (Center); Angusht Nazran (South); Gazovik Orenburg (Ural-Povolzhye); Luch-Energiya Vladivostok (East)	Khimki; Volgar Astrakhan

== Premier League ==
Pos	Team	Pld	W	D	L	GF	GA	GD	Pts	Qualification or relegation
1	CSKA Moscow (C)	30	20	4	6	49	25	+24	64	Qualification for the Champions League group stage
2	Zenit St. Petersburg	30	18	8	4	53	25	+28	62	Qualification for the Champions League third qualifying round
3	Anzhi Makhachkala	30	15	8	7	45	34	+11	53	Qualification for the Europa League group stage
4	Spartak Moscow	30	15	6	9	51	39	+12	51	Qualification to Europa League play-off round
5	Kuban Krasnodar	30	14	9	7	48	28	+20	51	Qualification for the Europa League third qualifying round
6	Rubin Kazan	30	15	5	10	39	27	+12	50	Qualification for the Europa League second qualifying round
7	Dynamo Moscow	30	14	6	10	41	34	+7	48 (Note: Dynamo Moscow ahead of Terek Grozny on head-to-head points; Dynamo Moscow–Terek Grozny 1–2, Terek Grozny–Dynamo Moscow 1–2.)	
8	Terek Grozny	30	14	6	10	38	40	−2	48	
9	Lokomotiv Moscow	30	12	7	11	39	36	+3	43	
10	Krasnodar	30	12	6	12	45	39	+6	42	
11	Amkar Perm	30	7	8	15	34	51	−17	29 (Note: Amkar Perm ahead of Volga Nizhny Novgorod and Rostov on head-to-head points; Amkar Perm: 7 pts, Volga Nizhny Novgorod: 5 pts, Rostov: 4 pts.)	
12	Volga Nizhny Novgorod	30	7	8	15	28	46	−18	29	
13	Rostov (O)	30	7	8	15	30	41	−11	29	Qualification for the Relegation play-offs
14	Krylia Sovetov Samara (O)	30	7	7	16	31	52	−21	28	Qualification for the Relegation play-offs
15	Mordovia Saransk (R)	30	5	5	20	30	57	−27	20	Relegation to Football National League
16	Alania Vladikavkaz (R)	30	4	7	19	26	53	−27	19	Relegation to Football National League

Source: Russian Premier League
Rules for classification: 1) points; 2) number of wins; 3) head-to-head points; 4) number of head-to-head wins; 5) head-to-head goal difference; 6) number of head-to-head goals scored; 7) number of head-to-head away goals scored; 8) goal difference; 9) number of goals scored; 10) number of away goals scored; 11) position in the 2011–12 season (only used until all the regularly scheduled games have been played); 11) extra play-off game or tournament between the teams in question.
(C) Champions; (O) Play-off winners; (R) Relegated

== First Division ==
Pos	Team	Pld	W	D	L	GF	GA	GD	Pts	Promotion or relegation
1	Ural Sverdlovsk Oblast (C, P)	32	19	11	2	61	18	+43	68	Promotion to Premier League
2	Tom Tomsk (P)	32	19	8	5	57	34	+23	65	Promotion to Premier League
3	Spartak Nalchik	32	15	8	9	32	27	+5	53	Qualification for promotion play-offs
4	SKA-Khabarovsk	32	13	13	6	36	26	+10	52	Qualification for promotion play-offs
5	Baltika Kaliningrad	32	14	8	10	40	33	+7	50	
6	Ufa	32	13	9	10	31	30	+1	48	
7	Neftekhimik Nizhnekamsk	32	13	8	11	44	40	+4	47	
8	Sibir Novosibirsk	32	12	9	11	34	38	−4	45	
9	Rotor Volgograd	32	11	8	13	27	26	+1	41	
10	Yenisey Krasnoyarsk	32	9	12	11	30	31	−1	39 (Note: Head-to-head record: Yenisey – Shinnik 2–1, Shinnik – Yenisey 0–0.)	
11	Shinnik Yaroslavl	32	9	12	11	28	33	−5	39	
12	Petrotrest St. Petersburg	32	10	5	17	28	43	−15	35	
13	Salyut Belgorod	32	8	11	13	25	31	−6	35	
14	Torpedo Moscow	32	6	15	11	29	38	−9	33	
15	Metallurg-Kuzbass Novokuznetsk	32	8	6	18	19	40	−21	30	
16	Khimki (R)	32	6	10	16	23	40	−17	28	Relegation to Professional Football League
17	Volgar Astrakhan (R)	32	5	11	16	23	39	−16	26	Relegation to Professional Football League

Source: FNL, Soccerway
Rules for classification: 1st points; 2nd matches won; 3rd head-to-head (points, matches won, goal difference, goals scored, away goals scored); 4th goal difference; 5th goals scored; 6th away goals scored
(C) Champions; (P) Promoted; (R) Relegated

== 2012–13 Russian Cup ==
1 June 2013
13:30 UTC+4

CSKA Moscow	1 – 1 (a.e.t.)	Anzhi Makhachkala
Musa 11'	Report	Diarra 74'
Penalties
Mamayev (penalty scored); V. Berezutski (penalty scored); Musa (penalty missed); Vágner Love (penalty scored); Doumbia (penalty scored)	4–3	(penalty scored) Boussoufa; (penalty missed) Zhirkov; (penalty scored) Willian; (penalty missed) Jucilei; (penalty scored) Eto'o

Terek Stadium, Grozny
Attendance: 28,000
Referee: Aleksandr Egorov

== 2012 Russian Super Cup ==
14 July 2012
16:00

Zenit St. Petersburg	0 – 2	Rubin Kazan
	Report	Bocchetti 28'; Dyadyun 38'

Metallurg, Samara, Russia
Attendance: 16,284
Referee: Sergei Karasyov (Moscow)

== Managerial Changes ==
Team	Outgoing	Manner	Date	Table	Incoming	Date	Table
Lokomotiv	(Portugal) José Couceiro	Contract expired	14 May 2012	Pre-season	(Croatia) Slaven Bilić	14 May 2012	Pre-season
Volga	(Russia) Dmitri Cheryshev	Sacked	7 June 2012	Pre-season	(Russia) Gadzhi Gadzhiev	7 June 2012	Pre-season
Spartak	(Russia) Valery Karpin	Resigned	10 June 2012	Pre-season	(Spain) Unai Emery	10 June 2012	Pre-season
Amkar	(Montenegro) Miodrag Božović	Resigned	11 June 2012	Pre-season	(Russia) Rustem Khuzin	11 June 2012	Pre-season
Rostov	(Russia) Anatoly Baidachny	Sacked	11 June 2012	Pre-season	(Montenegro) Miodrag Božović	11 June 2012	Pre-season
Dynamo	(Russia) Sergei Silkin	Resigned	6 August 2012	16th	(Russia) Dmitri Khokhlov (caretaker)	6 August 2012	16th
Kuban	(Romania) Dan Petrescu	Resigned	14 August 2012	8th	(Russia) Yuri Krasnozhan	16 August 2012	8th
Dynamo	(Russia) Dmitri Khokhlov (caretaker)	Caretaker spell over	17 August 2012	16th	(Romania) Dan Petrescu	17 August 2012	16th
Alania	(Russia) Vladimir Gazzayev	Resigned	14 November 2012	15th	(Russia) Valery Gazzaev	14 November 2012	15th
Krylia Sovetov	(Russia) Andrey Kobelev	Resigned	15 November 2012	12th	(Russia) Aleksandr Tsygankov (caretaker)	15 November 2012	12th
Mordovia	(Russia) Fyodor Shcherbachenko	Mutual agreement	19 November 2012	16th	(Russia) Vladimir Bibikov (caretaker)	19 November 2012	16th
Spartak	(Spain) Unai Emery	Sacked	25 November 2012	7th	(Russia) Valery Karpin (caretaker; from 13 Dec 2012 - permanent)	26 November 2012	7th
Mordovia	(Russia) Vladimir Bibikov (caretaker)	Caretaker spell over	28 December 2012	16th	(Romania) Dorinel Munteanu	28 December 2012	16th
Kuban	(Russia) Yuri Krasnozhan	Sacked	8 January 2013	4th	(Belarus) Leonid Kuchuk	9 January 2013	4th
Volga	(Russia) Gadzhi Gadzhiev	Resigned	19 January 2013	13th	(Ukraine) Yuriy Kalitvintsev	19 January 2013	13th
Krylia Sovetov	(Russia) Aleksandr Tsygankov (caretaker)	Caretaker spell over	27 January 2013	14th	(Russia) Gadzhi Gadzhiev	27 January 2013	14th
FC Terek Grozny	(Russia) Stanislav Cherchesov	Contract expired	26 May 2013	8th	(Russia) Yuri Krasnozhan	26 May 2013	8th

Last updated: 26 May 2013
