= 2010 Russian Premier League =

19th season of top-tier football league in Russia

Russian Premier League
- Season: 2010
- Champions: Zenit; 2nd title
- Relegated: Alania Vladikavkaz; Sibir Novosibirsk
- Champions League: Zenit; CSKA Moscow; Rubin Kazan
- Europa League: Spartak Moscow; Lokomotiv; Alania Vladikavkaz
- Matches: 240
- Goals: 561 (2.34 per match)
- Top goalscorer: Welliton (19)
- Biggest home win: Zenit 6–1 Saturn (25 September); Zenit 5–0 Rostov (14 November)
- Biggest away win: Sibir 1–4 CSKA (24 April); Tom 1–4 Anzhi (18 July); Lokomotiv 0–3 Zenit (29 August); Tom 0–3 CSKA (26 September); Dynamo 0–3 Spartak Nalchik (26 September); Terek 0–3 CSKA (17 October); Sibir 2–5 Zenit (7 November)
- Highest scoring: Spartak Moscow 5–3 Sibir (21 June)
- Longest winning run: Zenit (9 games) (28 April–31 July)
- Longest unbeaten run: Zenit (23 games) (13 March–24 October)
- Longest losing run: Sibir (5 games) (27 March–24 April); Anzhi (5 games) (12 September–17 October); Rostov (5 games) (26 September–30 October)
- Highest attendance: Spartak Moscow – CSKA Moscow 65,000
- Lowest attendance: Anzhi – Lokomotiv 3,000
- Average attendance: 12,288

The 2010 Russian Premier League was the 19th season of the Russian football championship since the dissolution of the Soviet Union and ninth under the current Russian Premier League name. The season started on 12 March 2010 and the last matches were played on 29 November 2010. On 14 November 2010, Zenit Saint Petersburg clinched the title after a 5–0 win against Rostov. This season was the last one played during an entire year (March–November), as the Russian Football Union decided to schedule the following seasons in sync with the biggest European football leagues (August–May).

== Teams ==
Kuban Krasnodar and Khimki were relegated at the end of the 2009 season after finishing in the bottom two places. Kuban make their immediate return to the First Division, while Khimki were relegated after a three-year tenure in the highest Russian football league.

The relegated teams were replaced by 2009 First Division champions Anzhi Makhachkala and runners-up Sibir Novosibirsk. Anzhi return after an eight-year hiatus from the Premier League, and Sibir will make their debut in the highest level of the Russian football pyramid.

On 5 February 2010, FC Moscow owner and main sponsor, MMC Norilsk Nickel, announced that the club will not play in the Premier League in 2010, possibly playing on a lower level instead. The club sent the official fax to the league refusing to participate in the 2010 competition on February 11, 2010. On 17 February, FC Moscow were officially excluded from the league and replaced by Alania Vladikavkaz, the third-placed team from the 2009 First Division. Alania thus make their return to the Premier League after a four-year absence.

=== Venues ===
Alania	Amkar	Anzhi	CSKA
Republican Spartak Stadium	Zvezda Stadium	Dynamo Stadium	Arena Khimki
Capacity: 32,464	Capacity: 19,500	Capacity: 16,863	Capacity: 20,000
Dynamo	Locations of teams in 2010 Russian Premier League Locations of teams in 2010 Russian Premier League, Sibir & Tomsk		Krylia
Arena Khimki	Locations of teams in 2010 Russian Premier League Locations of teams in 2010 Russian Premier League, Sibir & Tomsk		Metallurg Stadium
Capacity: 20,000	Locations of teams in 2010 Russian Premier League Locations of teams in 2010 Russian Premier League, Sibir & Tomsk		Capacity: 33,001
Lokomotiv	Locations of teams in 2010 Russian Premier League Locations of teams in 2010 Russian Premier League, Sibir & Tomsk		Rostov
RZD Arena	Locations of teams in 2010 Russian Premier League Locations of teams in 2010 Russian Premier League, Sibir & Tomsk		Olimp-2
Capacity: 28,810	Locations of teams in 2010 Russian Premier League Locations of teams in 2010 Russian Premier League, Sibir & Tomsk		Capacity: 15,842
Rubin	Locations of teams in 2010 Russian Premier League Locations of teams in 2010 Russian Premier League, Sibir & Tomsk		Saturn
Central Stadium	Locations of teams in 2010 Russian Premier League Locations of teams in 2010 Russian Premier League, Sibir & Tomsk		Saturn Stadium
Capacity: 27,434	Locations of teams in 2010 Russian Premier League Locations of teams in 2010 Russian Premier League, Sibir & Tomsk		Capacity: 16,726
Sibir	Locations of teams in 2010 Russian Premier League Locations of teams in 2010 Russian Premier League, Sibir & Tomsk		Spartak Moscow
Spartak Stadium	Locations of teams in 2010 Russian Premier League Locations of teams in 2010 Russian Premier League, Sibir & Tomsk		Luzhniki Stadium
Capacity: 12,567	Locations of teams in 2010 Russian Premier League Locations of teams in 2010 Russian Premier League, Sibir & Tomsk		Capacity: 78,360
Spartak Nalchik	Terek	Tom	Zenit Saint Petersburg
Spartak Stadium	Sultan Bilimkhanov Stadium	Trud Stadium	Petrovsky Stadium
Capacity: 14,194	Capacity: 10,400	Capacity: 14,950	Capacity: 21,570

=== Personnel and kits ===
Team	Location	Head Coach	Team Captain	Venue	Capacity	2009	Kit Maker	Shirt Sponsor
Alania	Vladikavkaz	(Russia) Vladimir Shevchuk	(Russia) Georgy Gabulov	Spartak	32,464	D1 3rd	Umbro	
Amkar	Perm	(Russia) Rashid Rakhimov	(Bulgaria) Martin Kushev	Zvezda	19,500	13th	Puma	
Anzhi	Makhachkala	(Russia) Gadzhi Gadzhiyev	(Russia) Rasim Tagirbekov	Dynamo	16,863	D1 1st	Adidas	
CSKA	Moscow	(Russia) Leonid Slutsky	(Russia) Igor Akinfeev	Arena Khimki	20,000	5th	Reebok	Bashneft
Dynamo	Moscow	(Montenegro) Miodrag Božović	(Russia) Dmitri Khokhlov	Arena Khimki	20,000	8th	Umbro	VTB
Krylia Sovetov	Samara	(Russia) Aleksandr Tarkhanov	(Russia) Ivan Taranov	Metallurg	33,001	10th	Nike	Rostekhnologii
Lokomotiv	Moscow	(Russia) Yuri Semin	(Russia) Dmitri Loskov	Lokomotiv	28,810	4th	Adidas	RZD
Rostov	Rostov-on-Don	(Ukraine) Oleh Protasov	(Russia) Aleksandr Cherkes	Olimp-2	15,842	14th	Patrick	
Rubin	Kazan	(Turkmenistan) (Russia) Berdyev	(Russia) Sharonov	Central Stadium	27,434	1st	Umbro	TAIF
Saturn	Ramenskoye	(Russia) Andrei Gordeyev	(Russia) Aleksei Igonin	Saturn	16,726	7th	Adidas	Promsvyazbank
Sibir	Novosibirsk	(Belarus) Igor Kriushenko	(Czech Republic) Tomáš Vychodil	Spartak	12,567	D1 2nd	Errea	Sibmost
Spartak Moscow	Moscow	(Russia) Valeri Karpin	(Brazil) Alex Raphael Meschini	Luzhniki	78,360	2nd	Nike	Lukoil
Spartak Nalchik	Nalchik	(Russia) Yuri Krasnozhan	(Montenegro) Miodrag Džudović	Spartak	14,194	11th	Umbro	Sindika
Terek	Grozny	(Russia) Anatoli Baidachny	(Russia) Shamil Lakhiyalov	Sultan Bilimkhanov	10,400	12th	Adidas	Zato-Bank
Tom	Tomsk	(Russia) Valeri Nepomniachi	(Estonia) Sergei Pareiko	Trud	14,950	9th	Adidas	
Zenit	St. Petersburg	(Italy) Luciano Spalletti	(Russia) Aleksandr Anyukov	Petrovsky	21,570	3rd	Nike	Gazprom

=== Managerial changes ===
Team	Outgoing	Manner	Date	Table	Incoming	Date	Table
Anzhi Makhachkala	(Russia) Omari Tetradze	Resigned	18 March 2010	10th	(Russia) Arsen Akayev (caretaker)	18 April 2010	11th
Anzhi Makhachkala	(Russia) Arsen Akayev (caretaker)	Finished	18 April 2010	11th	(Russia) Gadzhi Gadzhiyev		
Dynamo Moscow	(Russia) Andrei Kobelev	Sacked	27 April 2010	10th	(Montenegro) Miodrag Božović		
Krylia Sovetov	(Russia) Yuri Gazzaev	Resigned	25 July 2010	16th	(Russia) Aleksandr Tarkhanov		

== League table ==
Pos	Team	Pld	W	D	L	GF	GA	GD	Pts	Qualification or relegation
1	Zenit St. Petersburg (C)	30	20	8	2	61	21	+40	68	Qualification to Champions League group stage
2	CSKA Moscow	30	18	8	4	51	22	+29	62	Qualification to Champions League group stage
3	Rubin Kazan	30	15	13	2	37	16	+21	58	Qualification to Champions League third qualifying round
4	Spartak Moscow	30	13	10	7	43	33	+10	49	Qualification to Europa League play-off round
5	Lokomotiv Moscow	30	13	9	8	34	29	+5	48	Qualification to Europa League play-off round
6	Spartak Nalchik	30	12	8	10	40	37	+3	44	
7	Dynamo Moscow	30	9	13	8	38	31	+7	40	
8	Tom Tomsk	30	10	7	13	35	43	−8	37	
9	Rostov	30	10	4	16	27	44	−17	34	
10	Saturn	30	8	10	12	27	38	−11	34	Team disbanded after season (Note: Saturn Moscow Oblast were disbanded at the end of the season after amassing debts of RUB 800m.)
11	Anzhi Makhachkala	30	9	6	15	29	39	−10	33	
12	Terek Grozny	30	8	9	13	28	34	−6	33	
13	Krylia Sovetov Samara	30	7	10	13	28	40	−12	31	
14	Amkar Perm	30	8	6	16	24	35	−11	30	
15	Alania Vladikavkaz (Note: Despite being relegated, Alania Vladikavkaz will participate in UEFA Europa League 3rd qualifying round as finalists of the 2010–11 Russian Cup competition, lost to CSKA Moscow.) (R)	30	7	9	14	25	41	−16	30	Relegation to Football National League and qualification to Europa League third qualifying round
16	Sibir Novosibirsk (R)	30	4	8	18	34	58	−24	20	Relegation to Football National League

Source: RFPL (in Russian)
Rules for classification: 1st points; 2nd matches won; 3rd head-to-head (points, matches won, goal difference, goals scored, away goals scored); 4th goal difference; 5th goals scored; 6th away goals scored; 7th position in previous season or decision game
(C) Champions; (R) Relegated

=== Positions by round ===
Team ╲ Round	1	2	3	4	5	6	7	8	9	10	11	12	13	14	15	16	17	18	19	20	21	22	23	24	25	26	27	28	29	30
Zenit St. Petersburg	4	3	3	5	3	4	2	2	1	1	1	1	1	1	1	1	1	1	1	1	1	1	1	1	1	1	1	1	1	1
CSKA Moscow	4	5	4	7	2	3	3	3	3	2	2	2	2	3	2	3	2	3	3	3	3	3	3	3	3	3	2	2	2	2
Rubin Kazan	1	1	2	3	4	2	4	4	4	3	3	3	3	2	3	2	3	2	2	2	2	2	2	2	2	2	3	3	3	3
Spartak Moscow	11	12	7	9	7	8	7	5	5	5	7	8	7	6	8	8	6	6	7	6	6	6	4	4	4	4	4	4	4	4
Lokomotiv Moscow	14	7	11	8	11	10	5	6	8	8	8	6	5	5	6	6	7	8	9	8	8	7	7	5	5	5	5	5	5	5
Spartak Nalchik	9	3	1	1	1	1	1	1	2	4	4	4	4	4	4	4	4	4	4	4	5	4	5	6	6	6	6	6	6	6
Dynamo Moscow	4	5	8	11	12	12	10	11	10	11	9	9	9	9	10	12	11	9	11	9	10	10	9	8	7	7	7	7	7	7
Tom Tomsk	1	8	5	4	6	7	9	10	7	6	5	7	8	8	7	7	8	10	8	10	9	9	10	10	11	10	10	10	9	8
Rostov	14	14	10	12	10	5	6	8	6	7	6	5	6	7	5	5	5	5	5	5	4	5	6	7	8	8	8	8	8	9
Saturn	7	10	12	13	14	14	15	16	15	16	16	16	14	13	11	10	10	11	12	13	11	11	11	11	10	11	11	12	10	10
Anzhi Makhachkala	9	13	14	10	8	9	12	9	12	12	12	13	11	11	12	11	12	12	10	11	12	12	12	12	13	13	12	11	12	11
Terek Grozny	1	2	6	2	5	6	8	7	9	10	10	10	10	10	9	9	9	7	6	7	7	8	8	9	9	9	9	9	11	12
Krylia Sovetov Samara	11	16	16	16	13	15	14	14	14	14	14	15	16	16	15	15	15	16	15	15	15	15	15	14	12	12	13	13	13	13
Amkar Perm	11	9	9	5	9	11	11	13	11	13	13	12	12	14	14	14	14	14	14	14	14	14	14	15	15	15	14	14	14	14
Alania Vladikavkaz	7	11	12	14	15	13	13	12	13	9	11	11	13	12	13	13	13	13	13	12	13	13	13	13	14	14	15	15	15	15
Sibir Novosibirsk	14	14	15	15	16	16	16	15	16	15	15	14	15	15	16	16	16	15	16	16	16	16	16	16	16	16	16	16	16	16

Source: kicker.de (in German)
= Leader; = 2nd place; = 3rd place

== Results ==
Home \ Away	ALA	AMK	ANZ	CSK	DYN	KRY	LOK	ROS	RUB	SAT	SIB	SPA	SPN	TER	TOM	ZEN
Alania Vladikavkaz		0–0	0–0	1–3	0–0	2–3	0–0	0–0	1–1	1–1	2–1	5–2	1–0	2–1	2–1	1–3
Amkar Perm	1–0		1–0	0–0	0–1	2–1	1–2	1–0	0–1	0–1	3–1	0–2	3–1	2–0	2–1	0–2
Anzhi Makhachkala	2–0	1–0		1–2	1–1	0–0	0–1	1–2	0–1	1–2	1–0	0–1	0–0	1–0	1–0	3–3
CSKA Moscow	2–1	1–0	4–0		0–0	4–3	1–1	2–0	0–0	1–1	1–0	3–1	1–2	4–1	3–1	0–2
Dynamo Moscow	2–0	1–1	4–0	0–0		1–1	3–0	3–2	2–2	1–0	4–1	1–1	0–3	3–1	0–0	1–2
Krylia Sovetov Samara	1–0	1–1	3–0	0–1	1–0		0–0	1–2	0–2	2–1	1–1	0–0	2–0	1–3	2–3	0–1
Lokomotiv Moscow	3–0	2–0	2–1	1–0	3–2	3–0		0–1	0–0	0–1	1–1	2–3	1–0	2–1	2–1	0–3
Rostov	0–1	2–1	1–0	1–0	1–1	1–2	1–2		0–2	1–0	0–1	1–0	1–1	1–0	0–2	1–3
Rubin Kazan	1–0	3–0	0–0	0–1	2–0	3–0	2–0	2–1		2–0	1–0	1–1	1–1	0–0	2–1	2–2
Saturn	1–1	2–2	1–0	1–1	3–2	1–1	0–1	0–2	0–0		1–1	0–0	3–1	1–0	1–2	0–1
Sibir Novosibirsk	1–2	1–0	2–4	1–4	2–2	4–1	2–2	2–0	2–2	0–1		0–0	0–2	0–2	0–1	2–5
Spartak Moscow	3–0	2–2	3–0	1–2	0–1	0–0	2–1	2–1	0–1	2–1	5–3		0–0	2–1	4–2	1–0
Spartak Nalchik	2–1	2–1	1–3	1–1	1–0	1–0	1–1	5–2	1–1	2–0	4–2	0–2		2–1	2–1	2–3
Terek Grozny	2–0	1–0	1–3	0–3	1–1	2–0	0–0	1–1	1–1	2–0	1–1	2–0	1–1		1–0	0–0
Tom Tomsk	1–1	1–0	1–4	0–3	1–0	1–1	1–1	2–1	0–1	2–2	3–2	2–2	1–0	2–1		0–0
Zenit St. Petersburg	3–0	2–0	2–1	1–3	1–1	0–0	1–0	5–0	2–0	6–1	2–0	1–1	3–1	0–0	2–0	

Source: RFPL (in Russian)
Legend: Blue = home team win; Yellow = draw; Red = away team win.

== Statistics ==
=== Top goalscorers ===
As of matches played on 28 November 2010.

Rank	Player	Club	Goal
1	(Brazil) Welliton	Spartak	19
2	(Ukraine) Oleksandr Aliyev	Lokomotiv	14
2	(Belarus) Sergei Kornilenko	Tom / Rubin	14
4	(Russia) Aleksandr Kerzhakov	Zenit	13
5	(Russia) Vladimir Dyadyun	Spartak Nalchik	10
5	(Portugal) Danny	Zenit	10
5	(Russia) Artem Dzyuba	Tom	10
8	(Russia) Shamil Asildarov	Terek	9
8	(Germany) Kevin Kurányi	Dynamo	9
8	(Brazil) Vágner Love	CSKA	9

=== Top assistants ===
As of matches played on 28 November 2010.

Rank	Player	Club	Goal
1	(Russia) Vladimir Bystrov	Zenit	16
1	(Brazil) Alex	Spartak	16
3	(Serbia) Danko Lazović	Zenit	7
3	(Bulgaria) Georgi Peev	Amkar	7
5	(Ukraine) Oleksandr Aliyev	Lokomotiv	6
5	(Portugal) Danny	Zenit	6
5	(Brazil) Vágner Love	CSKA	6
5	(Russia) Igor Semshov	Dynamo	6
5	(Czech Republic) Tomáš Čížek	Sibir	6
5	(Russia) Aleksandr Marenich	Alania	6
5	(Russia) Roman Kontsedalov	Spartak Nalchik	6
5	(Ukraine) Andriy Voronin	Dynamo	6
5	(Russia) Aleksei Ivanov	Saturn	6

== Season events ==
=== Krylia Sovetov controversy ===
Krylia Sovetov Samara, who were scheduled to pass licensing on February 4, asked Russian Football Union to postpone their licensing until February 15 due to financial problems and debts to players. The club was reported to be close to liquidation due to shortage of financing. It later asked to postpone the licensing again to February 19, but the RFU only postponed it until February 17. On February 17 it was decided to postpone the licensing until February 19 after all. Krylia Sovetov finally received their license on February 19 after agreeing on new contracts with several companies to sponsor them, some of which might become partial owners of the club.

As the first matchday arrived, Krylia Sovetov were still banned from registering new players because of debts outstanding on old contracts. They could only register 11 players over 21 years old and several more players from the youth team that were registered for them in 2009. The transfer deadline had to be extended from March 11 to April 8 to accommodate Krylia Sovetov in hope they will pay their outstanding debts shortly. With injuries on top of that and only 16 players available for both their main squad and the reserve team, their reserve team had to finish their first game with 9 players on the field as they only had a goalkeeper on the bench after two players were injured, and the main squad had to play against FC Zenit St. Petersburg with a heavily diluted roster, so even the loss with the score 0–1 was saluted by the Krylia's fans. The transfer ban was confirmed again on March 16, and was to remain in place until Krylia paid back their debts to their former players Jan Koller and Jiří Jarošík. Krylia lost the second game with the diluted roster 0–3 to FC Lokomotiv Moscow. The ban was finally lifted on March 26.

== Awards ==
On 9 December 2010 Russian Football Union named its list of 33 top players:

Goalkeepers

1. (Russia) Igor Akinfeev (CSKA)
2. (Russia) Sergei Ryzhikov (Rubin)
3. (Ukraine) Andriy Dykan (Terek / Spartak M.)

Right backs

1. (Russia) Aleksandr Anyukov (Zenit)
2. (Russia) Sergei Parshivlyuk (Spartak M.)
3. (Russia) Aleksei Berezutski (CSKA)

Right-centre backs

1. (Russia) Vasili Berezutski (CSKA)
2. (Portugal) Bruno Alves (Zenit)
3. (Spain) César Navas (Rubin)

Left-centre backs

1. (Russia) Sergei Ignashevich (CSKA)
2. (Belgium) Nicolas Lombaerts (Zenit)
3. (Argentina) Leandro Fernández (Dynamo)

Left backs

1. (Slovakia) Tomáš Hubočan (Zenit)
2. (Russia) Georgi Schennikov (CSKA)
3. (Russia) Yevgeni Makeyev (Spartak M.)

Defensive midfielders

1. (Russia) Igor Denisov (Zenit)
2. (Russia) Roman Shirokov (Zenit)
3. (Russia) Pavel Mamayev (CSKA)

Right wingers

1. (Russia) Vladimir Bystrov (Zenit)
2. (Republic of Ireland) Aiden McGeady (Spartak M.)
3. (Russia) David Tsorayev (Anzhi)

Central midfielders

1. (Russia) Konstantin Zyryanov (Zenit)
2. (Brazil) Alex (Spartak M.)
3. (Japan) Keisuke Honda (CSKA)

Left wingers

1. (Portugal) Danny (Zenit)
2. (Russia) Alan Kasaev (Rubin)
3. (Chile) Mark González (CSKA)

Right forwards

1. (Russia) Aleksandr Kerzhakov (Zenit)
2. (Germany) Kevin Kurányi (Dynamo)
3. (Ivory Coast) Seydou Doumbia (CSKA)

Left forwards

1. (Brazil) Vágner Love (CSKA)
2. (Brazil) Welliton (Spartak M.)
3. (Russia) Artem Dzyuba (Spartak M. / Tom)

== Medal squads ==
1. FC Zenit St. Petersburg

Goalkeepers: Vyacheslav Malafeev (21), (Belarus) Yuri Zhevnov (8), Dmitri Borodin (1).
Defenders: Aleksandr Anyukov (27 / 1), (Belgium) Nicolas Lombaerts (26 / 3), (Slovakia) Tomáš Hubočan (23), (Portugal) Bruno Alves (14), (Croatia) Ivica Križanac (14 / 1), (Serbia) Aleksandar Luković (11), (Portugal) Fernando Meira (11), (Denmark) Michael Lumb (2).
Midfielders: Konstantin Zyryanov (28 / 2), (Portugal) Danny (27 / 10), Vladimir Bystrov (25 / 6), Igor Denisov (24), Roman Shirokov (21 / 6), (Serbia) Danko Lazović (20 / 5), (Italy) Alessandro Rosina (15 / 2), Viktor Fayzulin (14 / 2), (Hungary) Szabolcs Huszti (13 / 1), Sergei Semak (12 / 2), Aleksei Ionov (11).
Forwards: Aleksandr Kerzhakov (28 / 13), Maksim Kanunnikov (12 / 1), Aleksandr Bukharov (10 / 4).
Manager: (Italy) Luciano Spalletti.

Transferred out during the season: (Denmark) Michael Lumb (on loan to (Netherlands) Feyenoord).

2. PFC CSKA Moscow

Goalkeepers: Igor Akinfeev (28), Sergei Chepchugov (2).
Defenders: Sergei Ignashevich (28 / 2), (Lithuania) Deividas Šemberas (26), Georgi Schennikov (25), Aleksei Berezutski (23 / 1), Vasili Berezutski (22), Kirill Nababkin (13), (Nigeria) Chidi Odiah (11 / 1).
Midfielders: (Japan) Keisuke Honda (28 / 4), Pavel Mamayev (27), Alan Dzagoev (24 / 6), (Chile) Mark González (21 / 3), (Liberia) Sekou Oliseh (16 / 3), (Serbia) Zoran Tošić (15 / 3), Yevgeni Aldonin (14), (Serbia) Miloš Krasić (14 / 2), (Bosnia and Herzegovina) Elvir Rahimić (11).
Forwards: (Czech Republic) Tomáš Necid (24 / 7), (Brazil) Vágner Love (15 / 9), (Brazil) Guilherme (12 / 5), (Ivory Coast) Seydou Doumbia (11 / 5).
Manager: Leonid Slutskiy.

Transferred out during the season: (Serbia) Miloš Krasić (to (Italy) Juventus), (Brazil) Guilherme (end of loan at (Ukraine) Dynamo Kyiv).

3. FC Rubin Kazan

Goalkeepers: Sergei Ryzhikov (28), (Lithuania) Giedrius Arlauskis (2).
Defenders: (Spain) César Navas (29 / 1), (Argentina) Cristian Ansaldi (20), Aleksandr Orekhov (19 / 1), Vitali Kaleshin (15), Oleg Kuzmin (13), (Georgia (country)) Lasha Salukvadze (10), (Spain) Jordi Figueras (8), (Italy) Salvatore Bocchetti (7 / 2), Roman Sharonov (2).
Midfielders: Alan Kasaev (28 / 5), (Ecuador) Christian Noboa (27 / 8), (Poland) Rafał Murawski (23), Pyotr Bystrov (18), Andrei Gorbanets (17 / 1), (Turkey) Gökdeniz Karadeniz (17 / 1), (Israel) Bibras Natcho (14 / 2), Aleksandr Ryazantsev (13 / 2), Yevgeni Balyaikin (13), Sergei Semak (8 / 1), (Uzbekistan) Vagiz Galiullin (7), (South Africa) MacBeth Sibaya (7), (Brazil) Carlos Eduardo (6 / 2).
Forwards: Aleksei Medvedev (13 / 2), Aleksandr Bukharov (12 / 4), (Nigeria) Obafemi Martins (12 / 2), (Belarus) Sergei Kornilenko (8 / 3), (Turkey) Fatih Tekke (5), (Turkey) Hasan Kabze (5), Igor Portnyagin (4), (Uzbekistan) Bahodir Nasimov (2), (Moldova) Alexandru Antoniuc (1).

Manager: (Turkmenistan) (Russia) Kurban Berdyev.

Transferred out during the season: Sergei Semak (to Zenit), (Turkey) Fatih Tekke (to (Turkey) Beşiktaş), Aleksandr Bukharov (to Zenit), (Uzbekistan) Bahodir Nasimov (on loan to (Azerbaijan) Neftchi Baku), (Spain) Jordi Figueras (on loan to (Spain) Real Valladolid), (Uzbekistan) Vagiz Galiullin (on loan to Sibir Novosibirsk), (Turkey) Hasan Kabze (to (France) Montpellier).

== Attendances ==
Rank	Club	Average
1	Spartak Moscow	23,450
2	Zenit	19,419
3	Alania	16,467
4	Krylia Sovetov	14,119
5	Rubin	13,512
6	Lokomotiv Moscow	13,354
7	Tom	11,953
8	Rostov	11,233
9	Anji	11,067
10	Amkar	10,807
11	Sibir	9,973
12	Spartak Nalchik	9,433
13	PFC CSKA	8,647
14	Terek	8,293
15	Saturn	7,153
16	Dynamo Moscow	7,116

== See also ==
- 2010 Russian First Division
- 2009–10 Russian Cup
