= 2013–14 Russian Premier League =

22nd season of top-tier football league in Russia

Russian Premier League
- Season: 2013–14
- Champions: CSKA Moscow
- Relegated: Anzhi Makhachkala; Krylia Sovetov Samara; Tom Tomsk; Volga Nizhny Novgorod
- Champions League: CSKA Moscow; Zenit St. Petersburg
- Europa League: Lokomotiv Moscow; Dynamo Moscow; Krasnodar; Rostov
- Matches: 240
- Goals: 613 (2.55 per match)
- Top goalscorer: Seydou Doumbia (18)
- Biggest home win: Lokomotiv Moscow 5–0 Rostov; Spartak Moscow 6–1 Volga
- Biggest away win: Volga 0–5 Dynamo Moscow
- Highest scoring: Zenit St. Petersburg 6–2 Rubin Kazan
- Average attendance: 11,499

The 2013–14 Russian Premier League was the 22nd season of the Russian football championship since the dissolution of the Soviet Union and 12th under the current Russian Premier League name. The season started on 13 July 2013 and concluded on 17 May 2014, with a winter break between the weekends around 6 December 2013 and 6 March 2014.

CSKA Moscow were the defending champions.

== Teams ==
Locations of teams in the 2013–14 Russian Premier League
Locations of teams in 2013–14 Russian Premier League (Tomsk)

After previous season Mordovia Saransk and Alania Vladikavkaz were relegated to National Football League. They were replaced with Ural, FNL champions, and Tom Tomsk, FNL runners-up. Tom Tomsk returned to Premier League at first attempt, while Ural was absent from the top level for 16 seasons.

=== Personnel and sponsorship ===
Team	Location	Head coach	Captain	Kitmaker	Shirt sponsor
Amkar	Perm	(Russia) Konstantin Paramonov (caretaker)	(Russia) Dmitri Belorukov	Puma	Bank of Moscow
Anzhi	Makhachkala	(Russia) Gadzhi Gadzhiyev	(Moldova) Alexandru Epureanu	Nike	Energy Standard Group
CSKA	Moscow	(Russia) Leonid Slutsky	(Russia) Igor Akinfeev	adidas	Russian Grids
Dynamo	Moscow	(Russia) Stanislav Cherchesov	(Russia) Vladimir Granat	adidas	VTB
Krasnodar	Krasnodar	(Belarus) Aleh Konanaw	(Belarus) Alyaksandr Martynovich	Kappa	Westa
Krylia Sovetov	Samara	(Russia) Vladimir Kukhlevskiy (caretaker)	(Russia) Ivan Taranov	Nike	Samara Oblast^{1}
Kuban	Krasnodar	(Belarus) Viktor Goncharenko	(Russia) Aleksandr Belenov	adidas	RGMK
Lokomotiv	Moscow	(Belarus) Leonid Kuchuk	(Brazil) Guilherme	Puma	RZD
Rostov	Rostov-on-Don	(Montenegro) Miodrag Božović	(Croatia) Stipe Pletikosa	Joma	TNS Energo
Rubin	Kazan	(Russia) Vladimir Maminov	(Russia) Oleg Kuzmin	Puma	TAIF
Spartak	Moscow	(Russia) Dmitri Gunko	(Russia) Dmitri Kombarov	Nike	Lukoil
Terek	Grozny	(Russia) Rashid Rakhimov	(Russia) Rizvan Utsiyev	adidas	AK
Tom	Tomsk	(Russia) Vasili Baskakov	(Belarus) Sergey Omelyanchuk	Nike	Rosneft
Ural	Yekaterinburg	(Russia) Aleksandr Tarkhanov	(Russia) Denis Tumasyan	adidas	TMK
Volga	Nizhny Novgorod	(Russia) Andrei Talalayev	(Russia) Andrei Karyaka	adidas	Sberbank
Zenit	St. Petersburg	(Portugal) André Villas-Boas	(Russia) Konstantin Zyryanov	Nike	Gazprom

=== Managerial changes ===
Team	Outgoing	Manner	Date	Table	Incoming	Date	Table
Terek Grozny	(Russia) Stanislav Cherchesov	Contract expired	26 May 2013	Pre-season	(Russia) Yuri Krasnozhan	26 May 2013	Pre-season
Tom Tomsk	(Russia) Sergei Perednya	Contract expired	1 June 2013	Pre-season	(Russia) Anatoli Davydov	25 June 2013	Pre-season
Kuban Krasnodar	(Belarus) Leonid Kuchuk	Contract expired	10 June 2013	Pre-season	(Russia) Igor Osinkin (caretaker)	10 June 2013	Pre-season
Amkar Perm	(Russia) Rustem Khuzin	Contract expired	17 June 2013	Pre-season	(Russia) Stanislav Cherchesov	20 June 2013	Pre-season
Lokomotiv Moscow	(Croatia) Slaven Bilić	Mutual agreement	17 June 2013	Pre-season	(Belarus) Leonid Kuchuk	18 June 2013	Pre-season
Anzhi Makhachkala	(Netherlands) Guus Hiddink	Resigned	22 July 2013	12th	(Netherlands) Rene Meulensteen	22 July 2013	12th
Kuban Krasnodar	(Russia) Igor Osinkin (caretaker)	Caretaker spell over	31 July 2013	5th	(Romania) Dorinel Munteanu	31 July 2013	5th
Ural Sverdlovsk Oblast	(Russia) Pavel Gusev	Resigned	1 August 2013	15th	(Russia) Oleg Vasilenko	1 August 2013	15th
Krylia Sovetov Samara	(Russia) Gadzhi Gadzhiyev	Resigned	8 August 2013	14th	(Russia) Aleksandr Tsygankov (caretaker, since 29 August 2013 manager)	8 August 2013	14th
Anzhi Makhachkala	(Netherlands) Rene Meulensteen	Sacked	8 August 2013	13th	(Russia) Gadzhi Gadzhiyev	8 August 2013	13th
Krasnodar	(Serbia) Slavoljub Muslin	Mutual consent	9 August 2013	11th	(Belarus) Aleh Konanaw	11 August 2013	11th
Tom	(Russia) Anatoli Davydov	Sacked	15 September 2013	16th	(Russia) Vasili Baskakov	15 September 2013	16th
Kuban Krasnodar	(Romania) Dorinel Munteanu	Sacked	12 October 2013	10th	(Belarus) Viktor Goncharenko	12 October 2013	10th
Terek Grozny	(Russia) Yuri Krasnozhan	Resigned	28 October 2013	14th	(Kazakhstan) Vait Talgayev (caretaker)	29 October 2013	14th
Terek Grozny	(Kazakhstan) Vait Talgayev (caretaker)	Caretaker spell over	7 November 2013	15th	(Russia) Rashid Rakhimov	7 November 2013	15th
Ural Sverdlovsk Oblast	(Russia) Oleg Vasilenko	Mutual agreement	27 November 2013	14th	(Russia) Aleksandr Tarkhanov	27 November 2013	14th
Rubin Kazan	(Turkmenistan) Kurban Berdyev	Sacked	20 December 2013	11th	(Russia) Vladimir Maminov	10 January 2014	11th
Zenit St. Petersburg	(Italy) Luciano Spalletti	Sacked	11 March 2014	2nd	(Russia) Sergei Semak (caretaker)	11 March 2014	2nd
Spartak Moscow	(Russia) Valeri Karpin	Mutual agreement	18 March 2014	3rd	(Russia) Dmitri Gunko (caretaker, since 2 April 2014 manager)	18 March 2014	3rd
Zenit St. Petersburg	(Russia) Sergei Semak (caretaker)	Caretaker spell over	20 March 2014	2nd	(Portugal) André Villas-Boas	20 March 2014	2nd
Volga Nizhny Novgorod	(Ukraine) Yuriy Kalitvintsev	Resigned	28 March 2014	14th	(Russia) Andrei Talalayev	29 March 2014	14th
Dynamo Moscow	(Romania) Dan Petrescu	Mutual agreement	8 April 2014	4th	(Russia) Nikolai Kovardayev (caretaker)	8 April 2014	4th
Amkar Perm	(Russia) Stanislav Cherchesov	Mutual agreement	8 April 2014	7th	(Russia) Konstantin Paramonov (caretaker)	8 April 2014	7th
Dynamo Moscow	(Russia) Nikolai Kovardayev (caretaker)	Caretaker spell over	10 April 2014	4th	(Russia) Stanislav Cherchesov	10 April 2014	4th
Krylia Sovetov Samara	(Russia) Aleksandr Tsygankov	Resigned	5 May 2014	14th	(Russia) Vladimir Kukhlevsky (caretaker)	5 May 2014	14th

Last updated: 5 May 2014

== Tournament format and regulations ==
=== Basic ===
The 16 teams played a round-robin tournament whereby each team played each one of the other teams twice, once at home and once away. Thus, a total of 240 matches were played, with 30 matches played by each team.

=== Promotion and relegation ===
The teams that finished 15th and 16th were relegated to the FNL, while the top two FNL teams were promoted to the Premier League for the 2014–15 season.

The 13th and 14th Premier League teams played the 4th and 3rd FNL teams, respectively, in two playoff games, with the winner securing a Premier League spot for 2014–15 season.

== Season events ==
On 11 May 2014, the match between Zenit and Dynamo was interrupted in the 86th minute, with Dynamo leading 4–2, when Zenit fans ran out of the stands. At first they stood behind the goal line; when the referee decided to take the teams off the field into the dressing rooms and teams began to leave, one of Zenit's fans punched Dynamo player Vladimir Granat. It was originally reported that Zenit player Salomón Rondón was also attacked. Later, it was clarified that Rondón had a conflict with Dynamo player Marko Lomić, but that incident was not registered by the referee or the game inspector. The game was abandoned. Granat was diagnosed with concussion and missed Dynamo's last game of the season against Spartak Moscow. The punishment was decided on 14 May 2014 by the Control-Disciplinary Committee of the Russian Football Union. Dynamo was awarded a 3–0 win, and Zenit was fined 700,000 rubles; they were required to play their next two home games (in the 2014–15 season) in an empty stadium, and for an additional three home games the fan stands were empty. The Zenit fan who punched Granat, 45-year-old Aleksei Nesterov known as Gulliver, was not immediately arrested, and went into hiding for several days. Eventually, he gave himself up to the police and was charged with assault. The criminal charges against Nesterov were dropped in court after he reached a settlement with Granat, and he was then released.

== League table ==
Pos	Team	Pld	W	D	L	GF	GA	GD	Pts	Qualification or relegation
1	CSKA Moscow (C)	30	20	4	6	49	26	+23	64	Qualification for the Champions League group stage
2	Zenit St. Petersburg	30	19	6	5	63	32	+31	63	Qualification for the Champions League third qualifying round
3	Lokomotiv Moscow	30	17	8	5	51	23	+28	59	Qualification for the Europa League play-off round
4	Dynamo Moscow	30	15	7	8	54	37	+17	52	Qualification for the Europa League third qualifying round
5	Krasnodar	30	15	5	10	46	39	+7	50 (Note: Krasnodar ahead of Spartak Moscow on head-to-head points; Krasnodar–Spartak Moscow 4–0, Spartak Moscow–Krasnodar 3–2.)	Qualification for the Europa League second qualifying round
6	Spartak Moscow	30	15	5	10	46	36	+10	50	
7	Rostov	30	10	9	11	40	40	0	39	Qualification for the Europa League play-off round (Note: Rostov won the 2013–14 Russian Cup, therefore qualifying for the play-off round of the 2014–15 UEFA Europa League. However, it did not pass the Russian Football Union European licensing and thus its spot was given to Spartak. However, that RFU decision was then overturned by the CAS and Rostov was returned to the Europa League.)
8	Kuban Krasnodar	30	10	8	12	40	42	−2	38	
9	Rubin Kazan	30	9	11	10	36	30	+6	38 (Note: Rubin Kazan ahead of Amkar Perm on head-to-head points; Rubin Kazan–Amkar Perm 3–0, Amkar Perm–Rubin Kazan 0–0.)	
10	Amkar Perm	30	9	11	10	36	37	−1	38	
11	Ural Sverdlovsk Oblast	30	9	7	14	28	46	−18	34	
12	Terek Grozny	30	8	9	13	27	33	−6	33	
13	Tom Tomsk (R)	30	8	7	15	23	39	−16	31	Qualification for the Relegation play-offs
14	Krylia Sovetov Samara (R)	30	6	11	13	27	46	−19	29	Qualification for the Relegation play-offs
15	Volga Nizhny Novgorod (R)	30	6	3	21	22	65	−43	21	Relegation to Football National League
16	Anzhi Makhachkala (R)	30	3	11	16	25	42	−17	20	Relegation to Football National League

Source: Russian Premier League
Rules for classification: 1) points; 2) number of wins; 3) head-to-head points; 4) number of head-to-head wins; 5) head-to-head goal difference; 6) number of head-to-head goals scored; 7) number of head-to-head away goals scored; 8) goal difference; 9) number of goals scored; 10) number of away goals scored; 11) position in the 2012–13 season (only used until all the regularly scheduled games have been played); 11) extra play-off game or tournament between the teams in question.
(C) Champions; (R) Relegated

== Relegation play-offs ==
=== First leg ===
18 May 2014
15:00 MSK (UTC+4)

Ufa	5–1	Tom Tomsk
Golubov 4' (pen.), 10', 24', 61'; William Oliveira 83'	Report	Panchenko 56'

Dynamo Stadium, Ufa
Attendance: 4,500
Referee: Sergei Karasev

18 May 2014
19:00 MSK (UTC+4)

Torpedo Moscow	2–0	Krylia Sovetov Samara
Salugin 40'; Vlasov 67'	Report

Saturn Stadium, Ramenskoye
Attendance: 6,500
Referee: Sergei Ivanov

=== Second leg ===
22 May 2014
16:00 MSK (UTC+4)

Tom Tomsk	3–1	Ufa
Bashkirov 4'; Golyshev 23'; Portnyagin 73'	Report	Golubov 13'

Trud Stadium, Tomsk
Attendance: 7,500
Referee: Vladislav Bezborodov

Ufa won 6–4 on aggregate score and was promoted to the 2014–15 Russian Premier League.

22 May 2014
19:00 MSK (UTC+4)

Krylia Sovetov Samara	0–0	Torpedo Moscow
	Report

Metallurg Stadium, Samara
Attendance: 20,000
Referee: Mikhail Vilkov

Torpedo Moscow won 2–0 on aggregate score and was promoted to the 2014–15 Russian Premier League.

== Results ==
Home \ Away	AMK	ANZ	CSK	DYN	KRA	KRY	KUB	LOK	ROS	RUB	SPA	TER	TOM	URA	VNN	ZEN
Amkar Perm		1–0	1–3	2–1	2–2	0–0	3–1	0–0	1–0	0–0	2–1	0–1	2–0	0–2	5–1	1–2
Anzhi Makhachkala	2–2		0–3	4–0	1–2	0–1	0–0	2–2	0–1	1–0	0–1	3–0	0–2	0–1	0–0	1–2
CSKA Moscow	2–1	0–0		0–2	5–1	2–1	1–0	1–0	1–0	2–1	1–0	4–1	2–0	1–0	3–0	1–0
Dynamo Moscow	2–0	2–1	4–2		1–2	2–0	3–1	1–3	1–1	0–0	1–4	1–0	1–0	3–0	2–2	1–1
Krasnodar	2–1	1–0	1–0	1–1		1–1	1–2	1–3	0–2	1–0	4–0	3–2	4–0	0–1	3–0	1–2
Krylia Sovetov Samara	2–2	1–1	1–3	1–2	1–0		0–0	2–2	0–2	0–4	1–2	1–1	1–0	1–1	2–2	1–4
Kuban Krasnodar	0–3	2–0	0–4	1–1	1–3	4–0		1–3	2–2	1–1	2–2	3–1	2–0	3–2	4–0	1–4
Lokomotiv Moscow	4–0	0–0	1–2	1–0	3–1	2–1	1–0		5–0	0–0	0–0	2–1	0–0	3–0	3–0	1–1
Rostov	3–3	1–1	0–0	2–3	2–2	1–2	0–0	2–0		0–0	0–1	2–1	3–0	1–1	4–0	0–4
Rubin Kazan	3–0	5–1	0–0	2–2	0–1	1–1	0–2	1–2	1–2		2–1	1–1	1–2	1–0	3–1	2–1
Spartak Moscow	1–0	2–2	3–0	3–2	3–2	1–0	0–2	1–3	2–0	0–0		0–0	2–1	0–1	6–1	4–2
Terek Grozny	1–1	1–1	2–0	1–0	0–1	0–1	2–1	0–1	3–0	0–0	1–0		2–0	1–1	2–0	1–1
Tom Tomsk	0–0	2–2	1–2	1–3	1–1	2–0	1–2	2–0	3–2	0–1	2–1	0–0		1–2	1–0	0–3
Ural Sverdlovsk Oblast	0–0	2–1	2–2	1–4	0–2	1–1	2–1	0–3	1–4	0–3	0–2	2–1	0–0		1–2	1–2
Volga Nizhny Novgorod	0–2	2–1	1–2	0–5	0–1	1–2	1–0	1–2	2–1	2–1	0–1	1–0	0–1	1–2		1–3
Zenit St. Petersburg	1–1	3–0	2–0	0–3	4–1	2–1	1–1	2–1	0–2	6–2	4–2	2–0	0–0	2–1	2–0	

Source: Russian Premier League
Legend: Blue = home team win; Yellow = draw; Red = away team win.

=== Round by round ===
The following table represents the teams position after each round in the competition.

Team ╲ Round	1	2	3	4	5	6	7	8	9	10	11	12	13	14	15	16	17	18	19	20	21	22	23	24	25	26	27	28	29	30
CSKA Moscow	6	3	3	3	3	1	1	1	3	4	4	5	6	5	4	4	4	4	5	5	5	4	3	3	3	3	3	3	1	1
Zenit St. Petersburg	4	9	10	5	4	5	2	2	1	1	1	1	1	1	1	1	1	2	1	2	2	2	2	2	1	1	1	1	2	2
Lokomotiv Moscow	8	6	8	4	5	2	3	4	4	3	2	2	2	2	2	2	2	1	2	1	1	1	1	1	2	2	2	2	3	3
Dynamo Moscow	7	4	11	6	6	8	10	6	8	7	7	7	5	6	5	5	7	5	4	4	4	5	4	4	4	4	4	4	4	4
Krasnodar	13	11	7	10	11	10	7	8	5	6	5	4	4	4	6	6	6	6	6	6	6	6	6	6	6	6	6	5	5	5
Spartak Moscow	3	1	1	1	2	4	5	3	2	2	3	3	3	3	3	3	3	3	3	3	3	3	5	5	5	5	5	6	6	6
Rostov	2	5	2	2	1	3	4	5	6	8	8	9	9	11	11	9	9	8	10	8	8	8	8	8	8	8	8	9	7	7
Kuban Krasnodar	11	7	4	7	9	7	8	10	10	10	10	10	11	8	8	8	8	10	9	9	10	10	10	9	9	9	9	7	8	8
Rubin Kazan	12	8	5	8	7	9	6	7	9	9	9	8	8	10	9	10	10	9	8	11	9	9	9	10	10	10	10	10	9	9
Amkar Perm	1	2	6	9	8	6	9	9	7	5	6	6	7	7	7	7	5	7	7	7	7	7	7	7	7	7	7	8	10	10
Ural Sverdlovsk Oblast	9	14	15	12	12	13	13	13	13	14	14	15	14	15	13	14	14	14	15	15	13	15	12	12	13	11	12	12	12	11
Terek Grozny	15	13	13	15	14	14	14	15	16	16	16	14	13	13	14	15	15	15	14	14	15	13	14	13	11	12	11	11	11	12
Tom Tomsk	16	16	16	16	16	16	16	16	15	13	13	13	15	14	15	13	13	13	13	13	14	12	13	14	14	14	14	13	13	13
Krylia Sovetov Samara	14	15	14	14	10	12	12	11	12	12	12	12	12	12	10	11	11	11	11	10	11	11	11	11	12	13	13	14	14	14
Volga Nizhny Novgorod	10	12	9	11	13	11	11	12	11	11	11	11	10	9	12	12	12	12	12	12	12	14	15	15	15	15	15	15	15	15
Anzhi Makhachkala	5	9	12	13	15	15	15	14	14	15	15	16	16	16	16	16	16	16	16	16	16	16	16	16	16	16	16	16	16	16

Source: resultados-futbol.com

== Statistics ==
=== Top goalscorers ===
Rank	Player	Goals	Team
1	(Ivory Coast) Seydou Doumbia	18 (4)	CSKA
2	(Brazil) Hulk	17 (3)	Zenit
2	(Russia) Artyom Dzyuba	17 (4)	Rostov
4	(Armenia) Yura Movsisyan	16 (2)	Spartak
5	(Portugal) Danny	13	Zenit
5	(Senegal) Dame N'Doye	13	Lokomotiv
5	(Venezuela) Salomón Rondón	13	Rubin/Zenit
8	(Bulgaria) Georgi Peev	12 (8)	Amkar
9	(Serbia) Zoran Tošić	11	CSKA
10	(Russia) Aleksandr Kokorin	10	Dynamo

=== Hat-tricks ===
Player	For	Against	Result	Date
(Russia) Artyom Dzyuba	Rostov	Tom	3–0	27 July 2013
(Portugal) Danny	Zenit	Volga	3–1	3 August 2013
(Venezuela) Salomón Rondón	Rubin	Ural	3–0	1 September 2013
(Ukraine) Andriy Voronin	Dynamo	Ural	4–1	16 September 2013
(Serbia) Zoran Tošić	CSKA	Krasnodar	5–1	27 October 2013
(Armenia) Yura Movsisyan	Spartak	Zenit	4–2	10 November 2013
(Brazil) Ari	Krasnodar	Spartak	4–0	22 March 2014
(Venezuela) Salomón Rondón	Zenit	Rubin	6–2	6 April 2014
(Brazil) Hulk	Zenit	Krasnodar	4–1	12 April 2014

Last updated: 15 May 2014

== Awards ==
=== Monthly awards ===
Month	Premier League Manager of the Month		Premier League Player of the Month		Reference
Month	Manager	Club	Player	Club	Reference
July	(Russia) Valeri Karpin	Spartak	(Russia) Artyom Dzyuba	Rostov	
August	(Belarus) Leonid Kuchuk	Lokomotiv	(Portugal) Danny	Zenit	
September	(Russia) Stanislav Cherchesov	Amkar	(Brazil) Hulk	Zenit	
October	(Italy) Luciano Spalletti	Zenit	(Russia) Roman Shirokov	Zenit	
November	(Belarus) Leonid Kuchuk	Lokomotiv	(Ivory Coast) Seydou Doumbia	CSKA	

=== Top 33 ===
On 7 June 2014 Russian Football Union named its list of 33 top players:

Goalkeepers

1. (Russia) Igor Akinfeev (CSKA)
2. (Russia) Yuri Lodigin (Zenit)
3. (Russia) Aleksandr Belenov (Kuban)

Right backs

1. (Brazil) Mário Fernandes (CSKA)
2. (Russia) Roman Shishkin (Lokomotiv)
3. (Russia) Aleksei Kozlov (Kuban/Dynamo)

Right-centre backs

1. (Russia) Vasili Berezutskiy (CSKA)
2. (Croatia) Vedran Ćorluka (Lokomotiv)
3. (Russia) Vitali Dyakov (Rostov)

Left-centre backs

1. (Russia) Sergei Ignashevich (CSKA)
2. (Slovakia) Ján Ďurica (Lokomotiv)
3. (Russia) Vladimir Granat (Dynamo)

Left backs

1. (Uzbekistan) Vitaliy Denisov (Lokomotiv)
2. (Russia) Dmitri Kombarov (Spartak)
3. (Russia) Georgi Shchennikov (CSKA)

Defensive midfielders

1. (Sweden) Rasmus Elm (CSKA)
2. (Burkina Faso) Charles Kaboré (Kuban)
3. (Russia) Denis Glushakov (Spartak)

Right wingers

1. (Brazil) Hulk (Zenit)
2. (Russia) Aleksandr Samedov (Lokomotiv)
3. (Serbia) Zoran Tošić (CSKA)

Central midfielders

1. (Russia) Roman Shirokov (Zenit/Krasnodar)
2. (Bulgaria) Ivelin Popov (Kuban)
3. (Russia) Alan Dzagoev (CSKA)

Left wingers

1. (Portugal) Danny (Zenit)
2. (Brazil) Joãozinho (Krasnodar)
3. (Russia) Yuri Zhirkov (Anzhi/Dynamo)

Right forwards

1. (Ivory Coast) Seydou Doumbia (CSKA)
2. (Russia) Artyom Dzyuba (Rostov)
3. (Armenia) Yura Movsisyan (Spartak)

Left forwards

1. (Russia) Aleksandr Kokorin (Dynamo)
2. (Senegal) Dame N'Doye (Lokomotiv)
3. (Brazil) Wánderson (Krasnodar)

On the same day, the RFU also announced the individual awards.

Player of the year: (Ivory Coast) Seydou Doumbia (CSKA).

"Hope of the year" (under-21 players): (Russia) Aleksei Miranchuk (Lokomotiv).

Manager of the year: Leonid Slutsky (CSKA).

Referee of the year: Aleksei Nikolaev.

Team of the year: PFC CSKA Moscow.

For the contribution to the development of football: Sergey Galitsky (owner of FC Krasnodar).

== Attendances ==
Rank	Club	Average
1	Zenit	18,952
2	Terek	18,019
3	Kuban	14,046
4	Anji	13,739
5	Ural	13,222
6	Lokomotiv Moscow	12,884
7	Krasnodar	12,303
8	Krylia Sovetov	11,880
9	Spartak Moscow	11,644
10	Rostov	11,533
11	Amkar	10,717
12	PFC CSKA	9,693
13	Dynamo Moscow	7,860
14	Rubin	7,388
15	Volga	6,553
16	Tom	5,487
