= Alexander Tsygankov =

Alexander Tsygankov may refer to:

- Aleksandr Tsygankov (born 1968), Russian footballer and coach
- Alexander Andreyevich Tsygankov (born 1948), Soviet and Russian musician, composer, and music educator
