= Giorgi Revazishvili =

Giorgi Revazishvili may refer to:

- Giorgi Revazishvili (judoka) (born 1974), Georgian judoka
- Giorgi Revazishvili (footballer) (born 1977), retired Georgian football player
