= PFC Krylia Sovetov Samara =

Association football club in Russia

Krylia Sovetov
- Full name: Профессиональный футбольный клуб Крылья Советов Самара (Professional Football Club Krylia Sovetov Samara)
- Nickname: Krylia (Wings)
- Founded: 3 May 1942; 84 years ago
- Ground: Solidarnost Samara Arena
- Capacity: 44,918
- Owner: Samara Oblast
- Chairman: Vadim Andreev
- Manager: Sergei Bulatov
- League: Russian Premier League
- 2025–26: 11th of 16
- Website: pfcks.ru
Home colours	Away colours

PFC Krylia Sovetov Samara (Russian: Профессиональный футбольный клуб «Крылья Советов» Самара) is a Russian professional football club based in Samara that plays in the Russian Premier League. In 2004, they finished third in the Russian Premier League.

== History ==
Krylia Sovetov was founded in Kuybyshev (now Samara) in 1942. On 21 April 1946 the team played its first match in the highest division in the USSR in Alma-Ata, in which they lost 1–2 to Zenit Leningrad. Krylia Sovetov participated in 48 seasons of the Soviet Top League and 13 in the Russian Premier League, as well as 43 USSR Cups and 13 Russian Cups.

On 6 July 2002, Krylia Sovetov first played in a European competition, in the second round of the UEFA Intertoto Cup. They won this game with Dinaburg (Daugavpils, Latvia) played in Metallurg Stadium, by a score of 3–0. The goals were scored by Andrei Karyaka, Robertas Poškus and Rogério Gaúcho. In 2005, the team played in 2005–06 UEFA Cup and defeated BATE Borisov in the 2nd qualifying round (2–0, 2–0), but in the 1st round lost to AZ Alkmaar (5–3, 1–3). In 2009, they were eliminated in the Europa League 3rd qualifying round by St Patrick's Athletic.

=== 2010 licensing controversy ===
Krylia Sovetov Samara, who were scheduled to pass licensing on 4 February 2010, asked Russian Football Union to postpone their licensing until 15 February of the same year due to financial problems and debts to players. The club was reported to be close to liquidation due to shortage of financing.

It later asked to postpone the licensing again to 19 February, but the RFU only postponed it until 17 February. On 17 February it was decided to postpone the licensing until 19 February after all. Krylia Sovetov finally received their license on 19 February after agreeing on new contracts with several companies to sponsor them, some of which might become partial owners of the club.

As the first matchday arrived, Krylia Sovetov were still banned from registering new players because of debts outstanding on old contracts. They could only register 11 players over 21 years old and several more players from the youth team that were registered for them in 2009. The transfer deadline had to be extended from 11 March to 8 April to accommodate Krylia Sovetov in hope they will pay their outstanding debts shortly. With injuries on top of that and only 16 players available for both their main squad and the reserve team, their reserve team had to finish their first game with 9 players on the field as they only had a goalkeeper on the bench after two players were injured, and the main squad had to play against Zenit St. Petersburg with a heavily diluted roster, so even the loss with the score 0–1 was saluted by the Krylia's fans. The transfer ban was confirmed again on 16 March, and was to remain in place until Krylia paid back their debts to their former players Jan Koller and Jiří Jarošík. Krylia lost the second game with the diluted roster 0–3 to Lokomotiv Moscow. The ban was finally lifted on 26 March.

=== League and cup history ===
==== USSR ====
Season	Div.	Pos.	Pl.	W	D	L	GS	GA	P	Cup	Europe	Top scorer	Head coach
1944	-									R32	—		
1945	2nd	1	17	12	3	2	37	20	27	R32	—	(Soviet Union) Rumyantsev – 13	(Soviet Union) Novikov
1946	1st	10	22	3	8	11	16	52	14	R16	—	(Soviet Union) Ratnikov – 5	(Soviet Union) Novikov
1947	1st	7	24	8	6	10	32	45	22	R16	—	(Soviet Union) Sinyakov – 9	(Soviet Union) Abramov
1948	1st	11	26	5	9	12	22	40	19	R32	—	(Soviet Union) Sinyakov – 5 (Soviet Union) Karpov – 5 (Soviet Union) Zaytsev – 5	(Soviet Union) Abramov
1949	1st	10	34	10	12	12	40	61	32	R16	—	(Soviet Union) Gulevsky – 9	(Soviet Union) Abramov
1950	1st	7	36	15	10	11	44	44	40	SF	—	(Soviet Union) Gulevsky – 17	(Soviet Union) Abramov
1951	1st	4	28	11	12	5	34	25	34	QF	—	(Soviet Union) Voroshilov – 10	(Soviet Union) Abramov
1952	1st	8	13	5	3	5	16	14	13	R64	—	(Soviet Union) Voroshilov – 4	(Soviet Union) Abramov
1953	1st	7	20	6	5	9	22	25	17	RU	—	(Soviet Union) Gulevsky – 7	(Soviet Union) Burmistrov
1954	1st	11	24	7	6	11	20	28	20	R32	—	(Soviet Union) Voroshilov – 8	(Soviet Union) Burmistrov (Soviet Union) Solovyov
1955	1st	11	22	4	5	13	21	39	13	R16	—	(Soviet Union) Voroshilov – 7	(Soviet Union) Solovyov
1956	2nd, Group 2	1	34	26	5	3	84	19	57	-	—	(Soviet Union) Kirsh – 17	(Soviet Union) Solovyov
1957	1st	11	22	2	8	12	9	32	12	R16	—	(Soviet Union) Redkin – 4	(Soviet Union) Solovyov
1958	1st	10	22	6	6	10	23	29	18	R16	—	(Soviet Union) Guzik – 5 (Soviet Union) Karpov – 5	(Soviet Union) Abramov
1959	1st	11	22	6	1	15	26	37	13	-	—	(Soviet Union) Brednev – 5 (Soviet Union) Khusainov – 5 (Soviet Union) Deynekin – 5	(Soviet Union) Abramov
1960	1st	16	30	10	8	12	37	39	28	R32	—	(Soviet Union) A. Kazakov – 9	(Soviet Union) Abramov
1961	2nd, RSFSR-3	1	23	17	2	4	68	22	26	R16	—		(Soviet Union) Karpov
1961	2nd, Final	1	5	4	0	1	12	5	8	R16	—		(Soviet Union) Karpov
1962	1st	17	30	11	5	14	39	44	27	R16	—	(Soviet Union) A. Kazakov – 16	(Soviet Union) Karpov
1963	1st	15	38	11	7	20	45	53	29	R32	—	(Soviet Union) B. Kazakov – 16	(Soviet Union) Karpov
1964	1st	10	32	7	14	11	24	35	28	RU	—	(Soviet Union) Kokh – 6	(Soviet Union) Karpov
1965	1st	13	32	9	9	14	34	44	27	SF	—	(Soviet Union) A. Kazakov – 9 (Soviet Union) Zhukov – 9	(Soviet Union) Karpov
1966	1st	18	36	4	17	15	18	40	25	R32	—	(Soviet Union) Zhukov – 8	(Soviet Union) Karpov
1967	1st	11	36	8	18	10	23	28	34	R32	—	(Soviet Union) B. Kazakov – 7	(Soviet Union) Karpov
1968	1st	18	38	9	11	18	24	45	29	R32	—	(Soviet Union) B. Kazakov – 8	(Soviet Union) Karpov
1969	1st	19	34	8	8	18	34	48	24	R32	—	(Soviet Union) B. Kazakov – 13	(Soviet Union) Karpov
1970	2nd	7	42	17	13	12	43	32	47	R64	—	(Soviet Union) B. Kazakov – 14	(Soviet Union) Blinkov
1971	2nd	6	42	17	9	16	54	41	43	R32	—	(Soviet Union) Aryapov – 14	(Soviet Union) Blinkov
1972	2nd	4	38	14	17	7	50	35	45	R32	—	(Soviet Union) Krayev – 11	
1973	2nd	8	38	15	7	16	46	51	34	R32	—	(Soviet Union) Krayev – 9	(Soviet Union) Kirsh
1974	2nd	4	38	20	8	10	65	41	48	R32	—	(Soviet Union) Aryapov – 19	(Soviet Union) Kirsh
1975	2nd	1	38	22	9	7	78	36	53	R32	—	(Soviet Union) Aryapov – 25	(Soviet Union) Kirsh
1976 spring	1st	6	15	6	5	4	18	15	17	R16	—	(Soviet Union) Aryapov – 6	(Soviet Union) Kirsh
1976 autumn	1st	11	15	5	4	6	12	15	14	R16	—	(Soviet Union) Aryapov – 3 (Soviet Union) Smirnov – 3 (Soviet Union) Filippov – 3	(Soviet Union) Kirsh
1977	1st	16	30	2	7	21	18	59	11	R32	—	7 players – 2	(Soviet Union) Kirsh
1978	2nd	1	38	21	14	3	59	25	56	R32	—	(Soviet Union) Yeliseyev – 18	(Soviet Union) Gulevsky
1979	1st	18	34	7	5	22	24	60	19	QF	—	(Soviet Union) R. Sidorov – 7	(Soviet Union) Kirsh
1980	2nd	22	46	11	16	19	43	62	34	Qual.	—	(Soviet Union) Lovchev – 13	(Soviet Union) Fyodorov
1981	3rd, Group 2	7	32	11	13	8	41	26	35	-	—		(Soviet Union) Streltsov
1982	3rd, Group 2	4	32	16	7	9	40	25	39	-	—		(Soviet Union) Sarychev
1983	3rd, Group 2	1	28	19	8	1	49	18	46	-	—	(Soviet Union) Razveyev – 15 (Soviet Union) V. Sidorov – 15	(Soviet Union) Sarychev
1983	3rd, Final-3	2	4	2	1	1	3	3	5	-	—	(Soviet Union) Razveyev – 15 (Soviet Union) V. Sidorov – 15	(Soviet Union) Sarychev
1984	3rd, Group 2	1	32	21	5	6	76	24	47	R64	—	(Soviet Union) Razveyev – 23	(Soviet Union) Sarychev
1984	3rd, Final-1	1	4	3	1	0	9	3	7	R64	—	(Soviet Union) Razveyev – 23	(Soviet Union) Sarychev
1985	2nd	20	38	10	13	15	36	42	33	-	—	(Soviet Union) Razveyev – 8	(Soviet Union) Sarychev
1986	3rd, Group 2	1	33	21	5	7	55	27	47	R64	—	(Soviet Union) Babanov – 16	(Soviet Union) Lukashenko
1986	3rd, Final-A	1	4	3	1	0	4	1	7	R64	—	(Soviet Union) Babanov – 16	(Soviet Union) Lukashenko
1987	2nd	22	42	10	12	20	40	60	32	R64	—	(Soviet Union) Popov – 9	(Soviet Union) Lukashenko
1988	3rd, Group 2	3	32	15	9	8	50	28	39	R64	—	(Soviet Union) Korolyov – 11	(Soviet Union) Lukashenko
1989	3rd, Group 1	1	42	28	8	6	79	32	64	R32	—	(Soviet Union) Korolyov – 27	(Soviet Union) Antikhovich
1989	3rd, Final	4	5	2	0	3	6	17	4	R32	—	(Soviet Union) Korolyov – 27	(Soviet Union) Antikhovich
1990	3rd, "Centre"	3	42	19	11	12	53	35	49	QF	—	(Soviet Union) Korolyov – 16	(Soviet Union) Antikhovich
1991	3rd, "Centre"	2	42	26	8	8	83	41	60	R128	—	(Soviet Union) (Russia) Fakhrutdinov – 19	(Soviet Union) (Russia) Antikhovich
1992	-									QF	—		(Soviet Union) (Russia) Antikhovich

==== Russia ====
Season	Div.	Pos.	Pl.	W	D	L	GS	GA	P	Cup	Europe		Top scorer (league)	Head coach
1992	1st	14	30	10	11	9	27	27	31	-	—		(Russia) Fakhrutdinov – 10	(Russia) Antikhovich
1993	1st	14	34	9	12	13	37	47	30	R64	—		(Russia) Remezov – 11	(Russia) Antikhovich
1993	Releg. Tourn.	1	5	3	1	1	10	8	7	R64	—		(Russia) Valiyev – 5	(Russia) Antikhovich
1994	1st	13	30	6	12	12	30	51	24	R32	—		(Russia) Safronov – 7	(Russia) Bogdanov (Russia) Kikin (Russia) Averyanov
1995	1st	15	30	6	8	16	34	65	26	R32	—		(Armenia) Avalyan – 10	(Russia) Averyanov
1996	1st	9	34	12	9	13	31	38	45	R32	—		(Syria) Makhlouf – 6	(Russia) Averyanov
1997	1st	7	34	14	7	13	32	30	49	SF	—		(Russia) S. Bulatov – 9	(Russia) Averyanov
1998	1st	12	30	9	8	13	25	37	35	QF	—		(Russia) Tsiklauri – 6	(Russia) Averyanov
1999	1st	12	30	8	7	15	39	49	31	R32	—		(Armenia) Mikaelyan – 8	(Russia) Tarkhanov
2000	1st	14	30	8	5	17	25	45	29	R32	—		(Uzbekistan) Qosimov – 5	(Russia) Tarkhanov
2001	1st	5	30	14	7	9	38	23	49	SF	—		(Russia) Karyaka – 9	(Russia) Tarkhanov
2002	1st	5	30	15	4	11	39	32	49	QF	IC	QF	(Lithuania) Poškus – 11	(Russia) Tarkhanov
2003	1st	9	30	11	9	10	38	33	42	QF	—		(Russia) Karyaka – 9 (Russia) Tikhonov – 9	(Russia) Tarkhanov (Russia) Gadzhiyev
2004	1st	3	30	17	5	8	50	41	56	RU	—		(Russia) Karyaka – 17	(Russia) Gadzhiyev
2005	1st	14	30	7	8	15	29	44	29	QF	—		(Ukraine) Gusin – 7	(Russia) Gadzhiyev
2006	1st	10	30	10	8	12	37	35	38	R16	UC	1st Rnd.	(Bosnia and Herzegovina) Topić – 7	(Russia) Gadzhiyev
2007	1st	13	30	8	8	14	35	46	32	QF	—		(Georgia (country)) Mujiri – 9	(Russia) Tarkhanov
2008	1st	6	30	12	12	6	46	28	48	R32	—		(Russia) Bobyor – 8	(Russia) Slutsky
2009	1st	10	30	10	6	14	32	42	36	R16	—		(Czech Republic) Koller – 9	(Russia) Slutsky (Russia) Gazzaev
2010	1st	13	30	7	10	13	28	40	31	R32	EL	3rd QR	(Russia) Yakovlev – 4	(Russia) Gazzaev (Russia) Tarkhanov
2011–12	1st	12	44	12	15	17	33	50	51	R32; R32	—		(Belarus) Kornilenko – 10	(Russia) Tarkhanov (Russia) Kobelev
2012–13	1st	14	30	7	7	16	31	52	28	R16	—		(Paraguay) Caballero – 8	(Russia) Kobelev (Russia) Tsygankov (Russia) Gadzhiyev
2013–14	1st	14	30	6	11	13	27	46	29	R32	—		(Paraguay) Caballero – 6	(Russia) Tsygankov (Russia) Kukhlevsky
2014–15	2nd	1	34	22	7	5	54	19	73	QF	—		(North Macedonia) Jahović – 12	(Belgium) Vercauteren
2015–16	1st	9	30	9	8	13	19	31	35	R16	—		(Russia) Gabulov (Belarus) Kornilenko – 12	(Belgium) Vercauteren
2016–17	1st	15	30	6	10	14	31	39	28	R16	—		(Belarus) Kornilenko – 8	(Belgium) Vercauteren (Netherlands) Visser (caretaker) (Belarus) Skripchenko
2017–18	2nd	2	38	26	4	8	60	23	82	QF	—		(Belarus) Kornilenko – 10	(Russia) Tikhonov
2018–19	1st	13	30	8	4	18	25	46	28	R16	—		(Russia) Kanunnikov – 5	(Russia) Tikhonov (Montenegro) Božović
2019–20	1st	15	30	8	7	15	33	40	31	R16	—		(Russia) Sobolev – 10	(Montenegro) Božović (Russia) Talalayev
2020–21	2nd	1	42	32	5	5	100	26	101	RU	—		(Russia) Ivan Sergeyev – 40	(Russia) Igor Osinkin
2021–22	1st	8	30	12	5	13	39	36	41	R32	—		(Russia) Vladislav Sarveli – 9	(Russia) Igor Osinkin

=== European history ===
As of match played 6 August 2009

Competition	Pld	W	D	L	GF	GA
UEFA Intertoto Cup	4	3	0	1	7	3
UEFA Cup	4	3	0	1	10	6
UEFA Europa League	2	1	0	1	3	3
Total	10	7	0	3	20	12

Season	Competition	Round	Club	Home	Away	Aggregate
2002	UEFA Intertoto Cup	2R	(Latvia) Dinaburg	3–0	1–0	4–0
2002	UEFA Intertoto Cup	3R	(Netherlands) Willem II	3–1	0–2	3–3 (a)
2005–06	UEFA Cup	2QR	(Belarus) BATE Borisov	2–0	2–0	4–0
2005–06	UEFA Cup	3QR	(Netherlands) AZ	5–3	1–3	6–6 (a)
2009–10	UEFA Europa League	3QR	(Republic of Ireland) St Patrick's Athletic	3–2	0–1	3–3 (a)

== Current squad ==
As of 10 September 2026

Note: Flags indicate national team as defined under FIFA eligibility rules; some limited exceptions apply. Players may hold more than one non-FIFA nationality.

No.	Pos.	Nation	Player
2	DF	BLR	Kiryl Pyachenin
3	DF	CHI	Thomas Galdames
4	DF	RUS	Yuri Gorshkov
5	DF	CRO	Dominik Oroz
7	MF	SRB	Mihajlo Banjac
8	MF	RUS	Maksim Vityugov
10	FW	SLO	Martin Kramarič
11	MF	BIH	Amar Rahmanović
14	MF	RUS	Nikita Saltykov (on loan from Lokomotiv Moscow)
15	DF	RUS	Nikolai Rasskazov
17	MF	KAZ	Islam Chesnokov (on loan from Tobol)
18	DF	RUS	Ivan Lepsky
20	MF	RUS	Kirill Stolbov
22	MF	BRA	Fernando Costanza

No.	Pos.	Nation	Player
23	DF	RUS	Nikita Chernov
26	MF	CRC	Jimmy Marín
30	GK	RUS	Sergei Pesyakov
33	DF	RUS	Aleksey Lysov
39	GK	RUS	Yevgeny Frolov
47	DF	RUS	Sergei Bozhin
59	MF	RUS	Danila Savelyev
67	FW	RUS	Kazbek Mukailov (on loan from Krasnodar)
72	DF	ESP	Dani Fernández
73	FW	RUS	Vladislav Shitov
77	FW	RUS	Denis Makarov
78	MF	RUS	Denis Malikov
80	GK	RUS	Nikita Kokarev
97	MF	RUS	Ilzat Akhmetov

=== Out on loan ===
Note: Flags indicate national team as defined under FIFA eligibility rules; some limited exceptions apply. Players may hold more than one non-FIFA nationality.

No.	Pos.	Nation	Player
—	MF	RUS	Nikita Pershin (at Tekstilshchik Ivanovo until 30 June 2027)
—	MF	UKR	Dmytro Ivanisenya (at Tekstilshchik Ivanovo until 30 June 2027)

No.	Pos.	Nation	Player
—	FW	NGR	Geoffrey Chinedu (at AEL Limassol until 30 June 2027)
—	FW	BLR	Yegor Karpitsky (at Dnepr Mogilev until 31 December 2026)

== Coaching staff ==
- Head coach – Magomed Adiev
- Assistant coaches – Sergei Bulatov, (Belarus) Sergei Kornilenko, Mikhail Semernya
- Goalkeeping coach – Viktor Gaus

== Honours ==
=== Domestic tournaments ===
- Soviet Cup/Russian Cup
  - Runners-up (4): 1953, 1964, 2004, 2020–21
- Soviet First League/Russian National Football League
  - Champions (7): 1945, 1956, 1961, 1975, 1978, 2014–15, 2020–21

=== Other honours ===
- Progress Cup
  - Winners (1): 1976 (spring)

== Notable players ==
Had international caps for their respective countries. Players whose name is listed in bold represented their countries while playing for Krylia Sovetov.

USSR/Russia

- (Soviet Union) Ravil Aryapov
- (Soviet Union) Aleksandr Babanov
- (Soviet Union) **Galimzyan Khusainov**
- (Soviet Union) Vladimir Kornilov
- (Soviet Union) Yuri Korotkikh
- (Soviet Union) Konstantin Krizhevsky
- (Soviet Union) Evgeny Lovchev
- (Soviet Union) Fyodor Novikov
- (Soviet Union) Mykola Pavlov
- (Soviet Union) Vladimir Sakharov
- (Soviet Union) Viktor Voroshilov
- (Soviet Union) Yuriy Yeliseyev
- (Soviet Union) Vasili Zhupikov
- (Soviet Union) (Russia) Aleksandr Borodyuk
- (Soviet Union) (Commonwealth of Independent States) (Russia) Andrei Kanchelskis
- (Soviet Union) (Commonwealth of Independent States) (Russia) Vasili Kulkov
- (Commonwealth of Independent States) (Russia) Omari Tetradze
- (Russia) Roman Adamov
- (Russia) Ilzat Akhmetov
- (Russia) **Aleksandr Anyukov**
- (Russia) Aleksei Arifullin
- (Russia) **Anton Bobyor**
- (Russia) **Viktor Bulatov**
- (Russia) Taras Burlak
- (Russia) **Yevgeni Bushmanov**
- (Russia) Nikita Chernov
- (Russia) **Andrei Chichkin**
- (Russia) **Vyacheslav Dayev**
- (Russia) Maksim Demenko
- (Russia) **Maksim Glushenkov**
- (Russia) **Yuri Gorshkov**
- (Russia) Sergei Ignashevich
- (Russia) Vladislav Ignatyev
- (Russia) Oleg Ivanov
- (Russia) Maksim Kanunnikov
- (Russia) **Andrei Karyaka**
- (Russia) **Yevgeni Kharlachyov**
- (Russia) **Denis Kolodin**
- (Russia) Dmitri Kombarov
- (Russia) **Aleksandr Kovalenko**
- (Russia) Ilya Maksimov
- (Russia) Ramiz Mamedov
- (Russia) Sergei Petrov
- (Russia) **Sergei Pinyayev**
- (Russia) Vladimir Pisarsky
- (Russia) Igor Portnyagin
- (Russia) Danil Prutsev
- (Russia) Vladislav Radimov
- (Russia) Sergey Ryzhikov
- (Russia) Aleksandr Samedov
- (Russia) Igor Semshov
- (Russia) **Ivan Sergeyev**
- (Russia) Roman Shishkin
- (Russia) Aleksandr Sobolev
- (Russia) **Aleksandr Soldatenkov**
- (Russia) Andrei Solomatin
- (Russia) Aleksei Sutormin
- (Russia) Andrey Tikhonov
- (Russia) Roman Vorobyov
- (Russia) Dmitry Yefremov
- (Russia) **Roman Yevgenyev**
- (Russia) **Roman Yezhov**
- (Russia) Anton Zinkovsky

Former USSR countries
Armenia

- (Armenia) **Garnik Avalyan**
- (Armenia) **Karen Dokhoyan**
- (Armenia) **Karapet Mikaelyan**
- (Armenia) **Arthur Mkrtchyan**
- (Armenia) **Tigran Petrosyan**
- (Armenia) David Yurchenko

Azerbaijan

- (Azerbaijan) **Ramil Sheydayev**

Belarus

- (Belarus) **Vital Bulyha**
- (Belarus) **Alyaksandr Chayka**
- (Belarus) **Stanislaw Drahun**
- (Belarus) Aliaksandr Hleb
- (Belarus) **Andrey Hlebasolaw**
- (Belarus) **Timofei Kalachev**
- (Belarus) **Yegor Karpitsky**
- (Belarus) **Sergey Kornilenko**
- (Belarus) **Denis Kovba**
- (Belarus) **Dmitry Molosh**
- (Belarus) **Aliaksandr Oreshnikov**
- (Belarus) **Kiryl Pyachenin**
- (Belarus) **Uladzimir Shuneyka**
- (Belarus) **Aleksey Skvernyuk**
- (Belarus) **Dmitry Verkhovtsov**
- (Belarus) **Syarhey Vyeramko**

Georgia

- (Georgia (country)) **Aleksandre Amisulashvili**
- (Georgia (country)) Jano Ananidze
- (Georgia (country)) **Gia Grigalava**
- (Georgia (country)) **Davit Gvaramadze**
- (Georgia (country)) **Gela Inalishvili**
- (Georgia (country)) **Giorgi Loria**
- (Georgia (country)) **Davit Mujiri**
- (Georgia (country)) **Zurab Popkhadze**
- (Georgia (country)) **Giorgi Revazishvili**

Lithuania

- (Lithuania) **Nerijus Barasa**
- (Lithuania) **Andrius Jokšas**
- (Lithuania) **Robertas Poškus**
- (Lithuania) **Robertas Ringys**

Moldova

- (Moldova) **Vasile Coşelev**
- (Moldova) Alexandru Epureanu
- (Moldova) Alexandru Gațcan
- (Moldova) Radu Gînsari
- (Moldova) **Stanislav Ivanov**

Tajikistan

- (Tajikistan) **Farkhod Vosiyev**

Ukraine

- (Ukraine) **Andriy Husin**
- (Ukraine) Dmytro Ivanisenya
- (Ukraine) **Oleksandr Kyryukhin**
- (Ukraine) **Yuriy Sak**
- (Ukraine) **Serhiy Shmatovalenko**

Uzbekistan

- (Uzbekistan) **Bakhtiyor Ashurmatov**
- (Uzbekistan) Sergey Andreyev
- (Uzbekistan) **Marat Bikmoev**
- (Uzbekistan) **Sergey Lushan**
- (Uzbekistan) **Aleksey Polyakov**
- (Uzbekistan) **Mirjalol Qosimov**
- (Uzbekistan) **Andrei Rezantsev**

Europe
Belgium

- (Belgium) Jeroen Simaeys

Bosnia and Herzegovina

- (Bosnia and Herzegovina) **Marko Topić**
- (Bosnia and Herzegovina) Danijel Majkić
- (Bosnia and Herzegovina) **Amar Rahmanović**

Bulgaria

- (Bulgaria) **Dimitar Makriev**
- (Bulgaria) Tenyo Minchev

Croatia

- (Croatia) Mateo Barać

Czech Republic

- (Czech Republic) Jiří Jarošík
- (Czech Republic) **Jan Koller**

Finland

- (Finland) **Berat Sadik**

Macedonia

- (North Macedonia) **Adis Jahović**

Romania

- (Romania) **Paul Anton**
- (Romania) Cosmin Bărcăuan
- (Romania) **Florin Şoavă**

Serbia and Montenegro

- (Serbia and Montenegro) **Nenad Đorđević**
- (Serbia and Montenegro) **Vuk Rašović**
- (Serbia and Montenegro) (Serbia) **Ognjen Koroman**

Slovakia

- (Slovakia) **Ján Mucha**

Slovenia

- (Slovenia) **Suad Filekovič**
- (Slovenia) **Nejc Pečnik**
- (Slovenia) Miral Samardžić

Spain

- (Spain) Catanha

North and Central America
Haiti

- (Haiti) **Reginal Goreux**

Trinidad and Tobago

- (Trinidad and Tobago) **Sheldon Bateau**

South America
Argentina

- (Argentina) Adolfo Gaich

Brazil

- (Brazil) Roni
- (Brazil) Souza

Chile

- (Chile) Nicolás Canales
- (Chile) **Thomas Galdames**
- (Chile) **Eduardo Lobos**
- (Chile) Víctor Méndez
- (Chile) **Raúl Muñoz**

Colombia

- (Colombia) **Juan Carlos Escobar**
- (Colombia) **Carlos Quintero**

Costa Rica

- (Costa Rica) **Felicio Brown Forbes**
- (Costa Rica) Jimmy Marín

Paraguay

- (Paraguay) **Luis Nery Caballero**
- (Paraguay) Pablo Zeballos

Africa
Algeria

- (Algeria) **Raïs M'Bolhi**

Cameroon

- (Cameroon) **Benoît Angbwa**
- (Cameroon) Serge Branco

Ghana

- (Ghana) **Baba Adamu**
- (Ghana) **Laryea Kingston**
- (Ghana) Mohammed Rabiu

Nigeria

- (Nigeria) **Patrick Ovie**
- (Nigeria) **Duke Udi**

South Africa

- (South Africa) **Matthew Booth**

Zambia

- (Zambia) **Chaswe Nsofwa**

Asia
Iraq

- (Iraq) Safaa Hadi

North Korea

- (North Korea) **Choe Myong-Ho**

South Korea

- (South Korea) **Oh Beom-Seok**

== Club records ==
=== Most league games for Krylia Sovetov ===
1. (Soviet Union) Ravil Aryapov: 362
2. (Soviet Union) Valeryan Panfilov: 359
3. (Soviet Union) Aleksandr Kupriyanov: 328
4. Gennadi Sakharov / Boris Valkov: 299
5. (Russia) Ravil Valiyev: 290
6. (Russia) Aleksandr Tsygankov: 279
7. (Soviet Union) Viktor Karpov: 268
8. Gennadi Platonov: 247
9. Anatoli Blokhin: 242
10. (Soviet Union) Yevgeny Mayorov: 233
11. (Soviet Union) Boris Kazakov: 224
12. (Soviet Union) (Russia) Sergei Marushko / Ivan Shiryayev: 228
13. Nikolai Martynov: 220
14. (Soviet Union) Alfred Fyodorov: 219
15. (Belarus) Denis Kovba: 215
16. Anatoli Fetisov / (Soviet Union) (Russia) Dinar Sharipov: 211
17. (Soviet Union) (Russia) Viktor Gaus: 209

=== Most league goals for Krylia Sovetov ===
1. (Soviet Union) Ravil Aryapov: 105
2. (Soviet Union) Boris Kazakov: 76
3. (Soviet Union) Anatoli Kazakov: 72
4. (Soviet Union) Aleksandr Kupriyanov: 59
5. (Soviet Union) Vladimir Korolyov: 57
6. (Soviet Union) Aleksandr Gulevsky / (Russia) Ravil Valiyev: 51
7. (Russia) Andrei Karyaka: 49
8. (Soviet Union) Viktor Razveev: 46
9. (Soviet Union) Viktor Voroshilov: 44
10. (Soviet Union) (Russia) Vladimir Filippov / (Russia) Sergei Krayev: 41
11. (Soviet Union) Aleksandr Babanov / (Soviet Union) Valeryan Panfilov / (Russia) Ivan Sergeyev: 40
12. (Soviet Union) (Russia) Rustyam Fakhrutdinov / (Soviet Union) Dmitri Sinyakov / (Soviet Union) Anatoli Zhukov: 33
13. (Soviet Union) Viktor Karpov / (Soviet Union) Vadim Redkin: 32
14. (Armenia) Garnik Avalyan / (Soviet Union) Viktor Filippov: 28

== Manager history ==
- (Soviet Union) Viktor Novikov (1945–1946)
- (Soviet Union) Aleksandr Abramov (1947–1952)
- (Soviet Union) Pyotr Burmistrov (1953–1954)
- (Soviet Union) Vyacheslav Solovyov (1954–1957)
- (Soviet Union) Aleksandr Abramov (1958–1960)
- (Soviet Union) Viktor Karpov (1961–1969)
- (Soviet Union) Nikolay Glebov (1969)
- (Soviet Union) Vsevolod Blinkov (1970–1971)
- (Soviet Union) Gennady Sarychev (1972)
- (Soviet Union) Viktor Kirsh (1973–1977)
- (Soviet Union) Aleksandr Gulevsky (1978)
- (Soviet Union) Viktor Kirsh (1979)
- (Soviet Union) Alfred Fyodorov (1980)
- (Soviet Union) Boris Streltsov (1981)
- (Soviet Union) Gennady Sarychev (1981–1985)
- (Soviet Union) Viktor Lukashenko (1986–1988)
- (Soviet Union) (Russia) Viktor Antikhovich (1989–1993)
- (Russia) Valery Bogdanov (1994)
- (Russia) Anatoly Kikin (1994)
- (Russia) Aleksandr Averyanov (1994–1998)
- (Russia) Aleksandr Tarkhanov (1 Jan 1999 – 31 Dec 2003)
- (Russia) Gadzhi Gadzhiyev (20 Nov 2003–2006)
- (Russia) Vladimir Kukhlevsky (2006)
- (Russia) Sergei Oborin (13 March 2007 – 31 Aug 2007)
- (Russia) Aleksandr Tarkhanov (31 Aug 2007 – 11 Nov 2007)
- (Russia) Leonid Slutsky (1 Jan 2008 – 26 Oct 2009)
- (Russia) Yuri Gazzaev (26 Oct 2009 – 25 July 2010)
- (Russia) Aleksandr Tarkhanov (27 July 2010 – 28 June 2011)
- (Russia) Andrey Kobelev (30 June 2011 – 15 Nov 2012)
- (Russia) A. Tsygankov (interim) (15 Nov 2012 – 29 Dec 2012)
- (Russia) Gadzhi Gadzhiyev (27 Jan 2013 – 7 Aug 2013)
- (Russia) A. Tsygankov (interim) (6 Aug 2013 – 28 Aug 2013)
- (Russia) Aleksandr Tsygankov (29 Aug 2013 – 4 May 2014)
- (Russia) V. Kukhlevsky (interim) (5 May 2014 – 7 June 2014)
- (Belgium) Franky Vercauteren (8 June 2014 – 31 October 2016)
