= Aleksandr Kupriyanov =

Russian footballer (1952–2026)

Personal information
- Full name: Aleksandr Ivanovich Kupriyanov
- Date of birth: 23 July 1952
- Place of birth: Russian SFSR, Soviet Union
- Date of death: 14 September 2026 (aged 74)
- Height: 1.82 m (6 ft 0 in)
- Positions: Forward; defender; midfielder

Senior career*
Years	Team	Apps	(Gls)
1970–1980	Krylia Sovetov Kuybyshev	328	(59)
- * Club domestic league appearances and goals

Aleksandr Ivanovich Kupriyanov (Russian: Александр Иванович Куприянов; 23 July 1952 – 14 September 2026) was a Soviet footballer.

== Career ==
Kupriyanov spent his career at Krylia Sovetov Kuybyshev, he made 328 league appearances for the club and scored 59 goals. He started his career as a forward, but later also played as defender and midfielder.

Kupriyanov also played for RSFSR team at the 1979 Summer Spartakiad of the Peoples of the USSR.

== Death ==
Kupriyanov died on 14 September 2026, at the age of 74.

== Career statistics ==
Appearances and goals by club, season and competition
Club	Season	League		
Club	Season	Division	Apps	Goals
Krylia Sovetov Kuybyshev	1970	Soviet First League	16	2
Krylia Sovetov Kuybyshev	1971	Soviet First League	41	8
Krylia Sovetov Kuybyshev	1972	Soviet First League	35	9
Krylia Sovetov Kuybyshev	1973	Soviet First League	37	6
Krylia Sovetov Kuybyshev	1974	Soviet First League	37	13
Krylia Sovetov Kuybyshev	1975	Soviet First League	29	9
Krylia Sovetov Kuybyshev	1976 (spring)	Soviet Top League	8	0
Krylia Sovetov Kuybyshev	1976 (autumn)	Soviet Top League	13	0
Krylia Sovetov Kuybyshev	1977	Soviet Top League	18	2
Krylia Sovetov Kuybyshev	1978	Soviet First League	32	6
Krylia Sovetov Kuybyshev	1979	Soviet Top League	31	0
Krylia Sovetov Kuybyshev	1980	Soviet First League	31	4
Total			328	59

== Honours ==
Krylia Sovetov Kuybyshev

- Soviet First League: 1975, 1978

== See also ==
- List of one-club men
