= Aleksandr Babanov =

Russian footballer and coach

Personal information
- Full name: Aleksandr Anatolyevich Babanov
- Date of birth: 9 May 1958 (age 68)
- Place of birth: Voronezh, Russian SFSR
- Height: 1.67 m (5 ft 5 1/2 in)
- Positions: Midfielder; forward

Youth career
- FC Torpedo Togliatti

Senior career*
Years	Team	Apps	(Gls)
1975–1978	FC Torpedo Togliatti	35	(3)
1979	FC SKA Penza		
1980–1981	FC Krylia Sovetov Kuybyshev	41	(2)
1982	FC Torpedo Togliatti	32	(8)
1983–1987	FC Krylia Sovetov Kuybyshev	167	(38)
1988	FC Torpedo Togliatti	30	(6)
1989	FC Baltika Kaliningrad	39	(7)
1990	FC Kuzbass Kemerovo	1	(0)
1990–1991	FC Lada Togliatti	37	(10)
1991	FC Asmaral Kislovodsk	31	(6)
1992–1993	FC Lada Togliatti	34	(9)

Managerial career
- 1992–1993: FC Lada Togliatti (assistant)
- 2004: FC Lada Togliatti (executive director)
- 2006: FC Lada Togliatti (director)
- 2006–2008: FC Lada Togliatti
- 2009: FC Lada Togliatti (director)
- 2010–2012: PFC Krylia Sovetov Samara (reserves)
- 2016: FC Lada Togliatti
- 2017–2018: FC Lada Togliatti
- * Club domestic league appearances and goals

Aleksandr Anatolyevich Babanov (Russian: Александр Анатольевич Бабанов; born 9 May 1958) is a Russian professional football coach and a former player.
