= Vladimir Kornilov (footballer) =

Russian football player

Personal information
- Full name: Vladimir Trofimovich Kornilov
- Date of birth: 5 November 1923
- Place of birth: Samara, Soviet Union
- Date of death: 12 April 1983 (aged 59)
- Place of death: Kuybyshev, Soviet Union
- Height: 1.76 m (5 ft 9 in)
- Position: Goalkeeper

Youth career
- Zenit Kuybyshev

Senior career*
Years	Team	Apps	(Gls)
1945	Zenit Kuybyshev		
1946–1948	Trudovye Rezervy		
1949–1956	Krylia Sovetov	120	(0)
- * Club domestic league appearances and goals

Vladimir Trofimovich Kornilov (Russian: Владимир Трофимович Корнилов; 5 November 1923 – 12 April 1983) was a Soviet footballer who played as a goalkeeper in the 1950s.

== Career ==
Born in Samara, Samara Oblast, Vladimir Kornilov began playing youth football with Zenit Kuybyshev. In 1949, Kornilov joined Krylia Sovetov where he made his professional debut in the Soviet First League. He appeared in 120 competitive matches for Krylia Sovetov, was named to the list of the 33 best Soviet Top League players in 1952.

== Honors ==
=== Club ===
- Soviet Cup runner-up: 1953
- Soviet First League winner: 1956

=== Individual ===
- Top 33 players year-end list: 1952
