= Anatoly Kikin =

Russian footballer and manager

Personal information
- Full name: Anatoly Mikhaylovich Kikin
- Date of birth: 3 November 1940
- Place of birth: Kuybyshev, now Samara, Russian SFSR
- Date of death: 27 March 2012 (aged 71)
- Place of death: Samara, Russia
- Height: 1.69 m (5 ft 6 1/2 in)
- Position: Forward

Youth career
- FC Neftyanik Kuybyshev

Senior career*
| Years | Team | Apps | (Gls) |
| 1959 | FC Krylia Sovetov Kuybyshev | 0 | (0) |
| 1960–1961 | FC Neftyanik Syzran | | (4) |
| 1962–1968 | FC Krylia Sovetov Kuybyshev | 117 | (14) |
| 1968–1969 | FC Metallurg Kuybyshev | 52 | (12) |
| 1970–1972 | FC Torpedo Togliatti | 97 | (13) |

Managerial career
- 1989–1994: FC Krylia Sovetov Samara (assistant)
- 1994: FC Krylia Sovetov Samara (caretaker)
- 1994–1996: FC Krylia Sovetov Samara (assistant)
- 1997: FC Neftekhimik Nizhnekamsk (assistant)
- 1997: FC Nosta Novotroitsk (assistant)
- 1999: FC Zhemchuzhina Sochi (assistant)
- 2000–2001: FC Rubin Kazan (assistant)
- 2005: FC ShVSM Samara
- * Club domestic league appearances and goals

Anatoly Mikhaylovich Kikin (Russian: Анатолий Михайлович Кикин; born 3 November 1940 in Kuybyshev, now Samara; died 27 March 2012 in Samara) was a Russian football player and manager.
