= Ravil Valiyev =

Russian footballer and referee

Personal information
- Full name: Ravil Sabirzyanovich Valiyev
- Date of birth: 20 October 1966 (age 60)
- Height: 1.77 m (5 ft 9 1/2 in)
- Position: Midfielder

Youth career
- Voskhod Kuybyshev

Senior career*
Years	Team	Apps	(Gls)
1983–1985	FC Krylia Sovetov Kuybyshev	74	(12)
1986	FC Iskra Smolensk	16	(0)
1988–1993	FC Krylia Sovetov Samara	216	(39)
1994–1995	FC Lada Togliatti	62	(16)
1996	FC Neftekhimik Nizhnekamsk	17	(0)
- * Club domestic league appearances and goals

Ravil Sabirzyanovich Valiyev (Russian: Равиль Сабирзянович Валиев; born 20 October 1966) is a former Russian professional footballer and referee.

== Club career ==
He made his professional debut in the Soviet Second League in 1983 for FC Krylia Sovetov Kuybyshev.

== Referee career ==
After his retirement and until 2006 he worked as a referee, mostly in the third-tier PFL.
