= Alfred Fyodorov =

Soviet footballer and coach

Personal information
- Full name: Alfred Pavlovich Fyodorov
- Date of birth: 7 June 1935
- Place of birth: Kuibyshev, USSR
- Date of death: 8 October 2001 (aged 66)
- Place of death: Samara, Russia
- Height: 1.76 m (5 ft 9 in)
- Positions: Forward; midfielder

Senior career*
Years	Team	Apps	(Gls)
1955	Krylia Sovetov Kuibyshev		
1956	Avangard Chelyabinsk		
1956	Avanhard Kharkiv		
1957–1967	Krylia Sovetov Kuibyshev	219	(9)

International career
1965	USSR	1	(0)

Managerial career
- 1968–1969: Metallurg Kuibyshev
- 1970–1973: Torpedo Togliatti
- 1974–1976: Torpedo Togliatti (assistant)
- 1977–1978: FC Gastello Ufa
- 1979: Turbina Syzran
- 1980: Krylia Sovetov Kuibyshev
- 1981: FC Metallurg Magnitogorsk
- 1988–1989: Torpedo Togliatti
- 1990: FC Svetotekhnika Saransk
- 1991: FC Bujak Comrat
- * Club domestic league appearances and goals

Alfred Pavlovich Fyodorov (Russian: Альфред Павлович Фёдоров) (7 June 1935 – 8 October 2001) was a Soviet football player and coach.

== Honours ==
- Soviet Cup finalist: 1964.

== International career ==
Fyodorov played his only game for USSR on 4 September 1965 in a friendly against Yugoslavia.
