= Viktor Gaus =

Russian footballer

Personal information
- Full name: Viktor Eyrikhovich Gaus
- Date of birth: 25 November 1964 (age 61)
- Place of birth: Secheno, Kireyevsky District, Russian SFSR
- Height: 1.81 m (5 ft 11 1/2 in)
- Position: Goalkeeper

Team information
- Current team: FC Krylia Sovetov Samara (GK coach)

Senior career*
Years	Team	Apps	(Gls)
1986–1993	FC Krylia Sovetov Samara	209	(0)
1994–1996	FC Lada Togliatti	69	(0)
1997	FC Neftekhimik Nizhnekamsk	22	(0)
1998–1999	FC Nosta Novotroitsk	60	(0)
2000–2002	FC Rubin Kazan	65	(0)
2003	FC Neftyanik Ufa	11	(0)
2003–2005	FC Nosta Novotroitsk	0	(0)

Managerial career
- 2006–2009: FC Nosta Novotroitsk (assistant)
- 2009–2010: FC Tyumen (assistant)
- 2012–2015: FC Krylia Sovetov Samara (GK coach)
- 2015: FC Lada-Togliatti (assistant)
- 2016–2017: FC Krylia Sovetov Samara (GK coach)
- 2017–2018: FC Krylia Sovetov-2 Samara (GK coach)
- 2018: FC Krylia Sovetov Samara (U-21 GK coach)
- 2018–: FC Krylia Sovetov Samara (GK coach)
- * Club domestic league appearances and goals

Viktor Eyrikhovich Gaus (Russian: Виктор Эйрихович Гаус; born 25 November 1964) is a Russian professional football coach and a former player. He is the goalkeepers' coach with FC Krylia Sovetov Samara.

== Club career ==
He made his professional debut in the Soviet First League in 1987 for FC Krylia Sovetov Kuybyshev.

He made his Russian Premier League debut for Krylia Sovetov on 29 March 1992 in a game against FC Spartak Moscow and played 4 seasons in the RPL with Krylia Sovetov and FC Lada Togliatti.
