= Gennady Sarychev =

Russian footballer and coach

Personal information
- Full name: Gennady Andreyevich Sarychev
- Date of birth: 14 December 1938 (age 87)
- Place of birth: Ust-Charyshskaya Pristan, Russian SFSR
- Height: 1.70 m (5 ft 7 in)
- Position: Defender

Youth career
- 1950–1956: Sibselmash Novosibirsk

Senior career*
Years	Team	Apps	(Gls)
1957–1959	Sibselmash Novosibirsk		
1960–1966	Krylia Sovetov Kuybyshev	155	(0)
1967–1969	Dnepr Dnepropetrovsk	102	(0)

Managerial career
- 1971–1973: Krylia Sovetov Kuybyshev (assistant)
- 1974–1978: Spartak Ryazan
- 1979: Spartak Ryazan (assistant)
- 1981: Metallurg Magnitogorsk
- 1982–1985: Krylia Sovetov Kuybyshev
- 1986–1988: Afghanistan
- 1989: Baltika Kaliningrad
- 1990: Kuzbass Kemerovo
- 1991: Presnya Moscow
- 1991: Asmaral Kislovodsk
- 1992: Karelia Petrozavodsk
- 1993–1996: Neftekhimik Nizhnekamsk
- 1996: Nosta Novotroitsk (consultant)
- 1998: Neftekhimik Nizhnekamsk
- 2001: Baltika Kaliningrad (technical director)
- 2008: Lada-Tolyatti (assistant)
- 2011–2014: Krylia Sovetov Samara (academy)
- * Club domestic league appearances and goals

Gennady Andreyevich Sarychev (Russian: Геннадий Андреевич Сарычев; born 14 December 1938) is a Russian professional football coach and a former player.
