= FC PSK Dinskaya =

PSK Dinskaya
- Full name: Football Club PSK Dinskaya
- Founded: 2008
- Ground: Kuban Stadium
- Capacity: 1,100
- Manager: Vladimir Kukhlevsky
- League: TBC
- 2025: Russian Amateur Football League
- Website: pskfc.ru

FC PSK Dinskaya (Russian: ФК «ПСК» Динская) is a Russian football club based in Dinskaya. The club is formally registered with the league as based in Pervorechenskoye, which is a village 10km outside of Dinskaya.

== Club history ==
PSK was founded in 2008 and played in lower amateur levels. For the 2026 season, PSK was licensed for the fourth-tier Russian Second League Division B. It was assigned to Group 1. However, after playing just 12 games, on 17 June 2026 the club dropped out of the Second League due to insufficient financing.

== Club name history ==
- 2008: FC Dinskaya
- 2009–2012: FC Dinskoy
- 2013–2022: FC PSK Pervorechenskoye
- 2023–: FC PSK Dinskaya
