= Viktor Antikhovich =

Russian football coach and player (1945–2021)

Personal information
- Full name: Viktor Petrovich Antikhovich
- Date of birth: 5 April 1945
- Place of birth: Engels, Russian SFSR, Soviet Union
- Date of death: 20 December 2021 (aged 76)
- Place of death: Saint Petersburg, Russia
- Height: 1.87 m (6 ft 2 in)
- Positions: Midfielder; forward

Youth career
- Neftyanik Kuybyshev

Senior career*
Years	Team	Apps	(Gls)
1963–1964	FC Krylia Sovetov Kuybyshev	0	(0)
1964	FC Spartak Yoshkar-Ola	11	(0)
1966	FC Stroitel Otradny		
1967–1968	FC Spartak Yoshkar-Ola		(13)
1969–1970	FC Krylia Sovetov Kuybyshev	19	(0)
1970	FC Spartak Yoshkar-Ola	25	(8)
1971	SKA Rostov	12	(0)
1972–1975	FC Druzhba Yoshkar-Ola	102	(7)
1975–1976	Rubin Kazan	24	(0)

Managerial career
- 1973: FC Spartak Yoshkar-Ola (assistant)
- 1977–1979: FC Stroitel Nizhnekamsk
- 1980: FC Druzhba Yoshkar-Ola (director)
- 1983–1987: Voskhod Kuybyshev
- 1988: FC Krylia Sovetov Kuybyshev (assistant)
- 1989–1993: Krylia Sovetov
- 1994: Tekstilshchik Kamyshin (assistant)
- 1995: Lada-Tolyatti
- 1996–1997: FC Neftekhimik Nizhnekamsk
- 1997–1998: FC Nosta Novotroitsk
- 1999: Zhemchuzhina-Sochi
- 2000–2001: Rubin Kazan
- 2003–2004: Luch-Energiya Vladivostok
- 2009: FC Spartak Yoshkar-Ola
- 2011: FC Sakhalin Yuzhno-Sakhalinsk
- 2012: FC Piter Saint Petersburg
- * Club domestic league appearances and goals

Viktor Petrovich Antikhovich (Russian: Виктор Петрович Антихович; 5 April 1945 – 20 December 2021) was a Russian professional football coach and a player. He died on 20 December 2021, at the age of 76.
