= Ravil Aryapov =

Russian footballer and coach

Personal information
- Full name: Ravil Velimukhamedovich Aryapov
- Date of birth: 1 February 1948 (age 78)
- Place of birth: Stavropol (now Tolyatti), Russian SFSR
- Height: 1.70 m (5 ft 7 in)
- Positions: Midfielder; striker

Team information
- Current team: FC Krylia Sovetov Samara (reserves asst manager)

Senior career*
Years	Team	Apps	(Gls)
1967–1978	FC Krylia Sovetov Kuybyshev	362	(105)

Managerial career
- 1989: ShVSM-SKA Kuybyshev (assistant)
- 1995–1998: FC Krylia Sovetov Samara (assistant)
- 2000: FC Krylia Sovetov Samara (assistant)
- 2001–2002: FC Krylia Sovetov Samara (reserves assistant)
- 2005: FC Krylia Sovetov Samara (reserves assistant)
- 2007–: FC Krylia Sovetov Samara (reserves assistant)
- * Club domestic league appearances and goals

Ravil Velimukhamedovich Aryapov (Russian: Равиль Велимухамедович Аряпов; born 1 February 1948, in Stavropol, now Tolyatti) is a Russian professional football coach and a former player. As of July 2009, he is an assistant coach with the reserve team of FC Krylia Sovetov Samara.

== Honours ==
- Top scorer in FC Krylia Sovetov Samara history: 105 goals.
