= Boris Kazakov =

Soviet footballer

Personal information
- Full name: Boris Aleksandrovich Kazakov
- Date of birth: 6 November 1940
- Place of birth: Kuibyshev, USSR
- Date of death: 25 November 1978 (aged 38)
- Place of death: Kuibyshev, USSR
- Position: Forward

Senior career*
Years	Team	Apps	(Gls)
1960–1963	FC Krylia Sovetov Kuybyshev	74	(34)
1964–1966	PFC CSKA Moscow	80	(39)
1967–1971	Krylia Sovetov Kuybyshev	150	(42)
1972–1973	FC Kord Balakovo	57	(15)

International career
1965–1966	USSR	6	(1)

Managerial career
- 1976–1977: FC Torpedo Togliatti
- * Club domestic league appearances and goals

Boris Aleksandrovich Kazakov (Russian: Борис Александрович Казаков) (born 6 November 1940 in Kuibyshev; died 25 November 1978 in Kuibyshev) was a Soviet football player. He died when he tried to drive his car over the ice-covered river and the ice broke, drowning the car with him in it.

== Honours ==
- Soviet Top League bronze: 1964, 1965.
- Top 33 year-end list: once.
- Grigory Fedotov club member.

== International career ==
Kazakov made his debut for USSR on 16 May 1965 in a friendly against Austria. He played in 1966 FIFA World Cup qualifiers (scoring a goal against Greece), but was not selected for the final tournament squad.
