= Viktor Voroshilov =

Soviet footballer

Personal information
- Full name: Viktor Fedosovich Voroshilov
- Date of birth: 15 August 1926
- Place of birth: Vsekhsvyatskoye, USSR
- Date of death: 5 March 2011 (aged 84)
- Place of death: Russia
- Height: 1.72 m (5 ft 8 in)
- Position: Striker

Senior career*
Years	Team	Apps	(Gls)
1948	Krylia Sovetov Moscow (reserves)		
1949–1955	Krylia Sovetov Kuibyshev	169	(44)
1956–1962	Lokomotiv Moscow	162	(63)

International career
1958	USSR	1	(1)

Managerial career
- 1963–1965: FC Lokomotiv Moscow (assistant)
- 1968–1969: FC Shakhtar Donetsk (assistant)
- 1970: FC Lokomotiv Moscow (director)
- 1971–1972: FC Lokomotiv Moscow (assistant)
- 1973–1991: FC Lokomotiv Moscow (youth teams)
- * Club domestic league appearances and goals

Viktor Fedosovich Voroshilov (Russian: Виктор Федосович Ворошилов; born August 15, 1926, in Vsekhsvyatskoye village - now incorporated into Moscow; died March 5, 2011) was a Soviet football player.

== Honours ==
- Soviet Top League runner-up: 1959.
- Soviet Cup winner: 1957.
- Soviet Cup runner-up: 1953.
- Top 33 players year-end list: 1951, 1958.
- Grigory Fedotov Club member: 117 goals.

== International career ==
Voroshilov played his only game for USSR on August 30, 1958, in a friendly against Czechoslovakia and scored a goal in that game.
