= Aleksandr Tsygankov =

Russian footballer

Personal information
- Full name: Aleksandr Valeryevich Tsygankov
- Date of birth: 9 February 1968 (age 58)
- Place of birth: Kuybyshev, now Samara, Russian SFSR
- Height: 1.70 m (5 ft 7 in)
- Positions: Defender; midfielder

Youth career
- Voskhod Kuybyshev

Senior career*
Years	Team	Apps	(Gls)
1986	FC Spartak Zhytomyr	36	(0)
1987–1988	FC Zirka Berdychiv		
1988	FC Spartak Zhytomyr	2	(0)
1989–1993	FC Krylia Sovetov Samara	157	(9)
1994	FC Tekstilshchik Kamyshin	25	(4)
1995	FC Lada Togliatti	40	(2)
1996–2000	FC Krylia Sovetov Samara	118	(1)

Managerial career
- 2001–2006: FC Krylia Sovetov Samara (assistant)
- 2007: FC Anzhi Makhachkala (assistant)
- 2007–2008: FC Saturn Moscow Oblast (assistant)
- 2008: FC Saturn Moscow Oblast (caretaker)
- 2009: FC Anzhi Makhachkala (assistant)
- 2010: FC Saturn Moscow Oblast (assistant)
- 2012–2013: FC Krylia Sovetov Samara (caretaker)
- 2013: FC Krylia Sovetov Samara (assistant)
- 2013: FC Krylia Sovetov Samara (caretaker)
- 2013–2014: FC Krylia Sovetov Samara
- * Club domestic league appearances and goals

Aleksandr Valeryevich Tsygankov (Russian: Александр Валерьевич Цыганков; born 9 February 1968) is a Russian professional football coach and a former player.

== Coaching career ==
Following resignation of Andrey Kobelev from manager position on November 15, 2012, Tsygankov was appointed as caretaker manager of FC Krylia Sovetov Samara for the first time. The next year, he was appointed as caretaker manager of FC Krylia Sovetov Samara after resignation of Gadzhi Gadzhiyev. After 2 games in charge, he was appointed manager of FC Krylia Sovetov Samara on a permanent deal. After 28 matchdays of 2013–14 season, though, Krylia Sovetov failed to win a single match in 2014 and were close to relegation zone, and Tsygankov resigned.

== Playing career ==
As a player, he made his professional debut in the Soviet Second League in 1986 for FC Spartak Zhytomyr. He played 3 games in the UEFA Cup 1994–95 for FC Tekstilshchik Kamyshin.
