= Anatoly Zhukov =

Belarusian footballer

Personal information
- Date of birth: 13 June 1991 (age 35)
- Place of birth: Belarus
- Position: Defender

Youth career
- 2007–2010: Minsk

Senior career*
Years	Team	Apps	(Gls)
2011–2012	Kommunalnik Slonim	63	(4)
2013	Polotsk	12	(1)
2013–2017	Slonim-2017	102	(9)
2018–2019	Naftan Novopolotsk	34	(4)
2019	→ Slonim-2017 (loan)	7	(0)
- * Club domestic league appearances and goals as of 31 December 2019

Anatoly Zhukov (Belarusian: Анатоль Жукаў; Russian: Анатолий Жуков; born 13 June 1991) is a Belarusian former professional footballer.

On 16 January 2020, the BFF banned Zhukov for 12 months for his involvement in the match fixing.
