= Giorgi Revazishvili (footballer) =

Georgian footballer

Personal information
- Date of birth: 31 March 1977 (age 49)
- Place of birth: Georgia, Gori
- Height: 1.80 m (5 ft 11 in)
- Position: Defender

Senior career*
Years	Team	Apps	(Gls)
1993–1997	FC Dila Gori	108	(12)
1998	FC Merani-91 Tbilisi	0	(0)
1998	FC Odishi Zugdidi	13	(1)
1998	FC Krylia Sovetov Samara	3	(0)
1999–2000	FC Sheriff Tiraspol	16	(0)
2000	FC Haiduc-Sporting USM	3	(0)
2001–2003	FC Dila Gori	46	(1)
2003–2004	FC Tskhinvali	13	(6)
2004	FC Torpedo Kutaisi	10	(0)
2005–2006	FC Dila Gori	29	(1)

International career
1998	Georgia	1	(0)
- * Club domestic league appearances and goals

Giorgi Revazishvili (born 31 March 1977) is a retired Georgian professional football player.
