= Alexander Andreyevich Tsygankov =

Russian composer

Alexander Andreyevich Tsygankov (Russian: Александр Андреевич Цыганков, scientific transliteration Aleksandr Andreevič Cygankov; also spelled Zygankow; born 1 November 1948, Omsk, Russian SFSR, USSR) is a Soviet and Russian musician, domra player, composer, and music educator. He is a People's Artist of Russia (1998) and professor at the Gnessin Russian Academy of Music. Tsygankov is the author of numerous works for the domra.

== Life and career ==
Tsygankov received his first musical education in Omsk at Music School No. 2 and the Shebalin Music College. He later graduated from the Gnessin State Musical-Pedagogical Institute. He has won various prizes and awards. Tsygankov works as a lecturer at the Gnessin Russian Academy of Music, specializing in domra. He created various works that gave a new direction to domra playing and, more broadly, to Russian plucked string instrument music.

He gave about 1,500 solo concerts in all regions of the Russian Federation, republics of the former Soviet Union and foreign countries.

Several of his compositions are for example part in the repertoire of the balalaika player Anastasia Tyurina (ru), including the Concerto Symphony for Balalaika and Orchestra. Recently, his work “Ethno-Fusion Concertino” for domra and orchestra, incorporating various jazz style elements and those of light muse, was performed by the Symphony Orchestra of the Ministry of Defense of the Russian Federation in the Concert Hall of the Gnessin Russian Academy of Music.

== Selected works ==
- Concerto Symphony for Balalaika and Orchestra (4 movements: 1. (Witches') Sabbath, 2. Bright Rus', 3. Magical Castle, 4. Celebration) (example with Anastasia Tyurina)
- Poem in Memory of Shostakovich
- Introduction and Csárdás (performed with the composer)
- Belolica-Kruglolica
- Chastushki (example with Konstantin Zakharato)
- Fantasia on a Russian Folk Song (for domra and plucked string orchestra)
- Two Step / Тустеп (Song about a girl named Nadya) (performed by Diljara Sagdeeva)
- Ethno-Fusion Concertino (Этно-фьюжн концертино) for domra and orchestra
