= Viktor Karpov =

Soviet diplomat (1928–1997)

- Born: Viktor Pavlovich Karpov; October 9, 1928; Penza, RSFSR, Soviet Union
- Died: February 2, 1997 (aged 68); Moscow, Russia

Viktor Pavlovich Karpov (Russian: Виктор Павлович Карпов; 9 October 1928 – 2 February 1997) was a Russian diplomat, Deputy Soviet Foreign Minister in 1990–1991.

Karpov graduated from the Moscow State Institute of International Relations in 1951, and went on to work in various diplomatic posts in the central offices of the Ministry of Foreign Affairs and abroad.

From 1960 to 1962, he was the Senior Adviser at the Soviet Embassy in Washington. Since 1968 joined the Soviet-American negotiations on reduction of strategic weapons in Helsinki, Vienna, Geneva.

- 1990–1991 — Soviet Deputy Foreign Minister, in charge of Soviet-American relations and negotiations on reduction of strategic weapons, served as the Chief Soviet Strategic Arms Control Negotiator.- books.google.ru/books?ISBN 0-271-01603-5
- Karpov personally contributed to working out such important treaties as INF Treaty, START-1 and START-2 Treaty.
- Since 1991 worked as the advisor to the Ministry of Foreign Affairs, Russia in Moscow until his death in Moscow in 1997
