= Vladimir Kukhlevsky =

Russian footballer

Personal information
- Full name: Vladimir Aleksandrovich Kukhlevsky
- Date of birth: 5 January 1959 (age 67)
- Height: 1.73 m (5 ft 8 in)
- Positions: Forward; midfielder

Team information
- Current team: FC PSK Dinskaya (manager)

Senior career*
Years	Team	Apps	(Gls)
1977	FC Avtomobilist Krasnoyarsk	13	(2)
1977–1979	PFC CSKA Moscow	12	(0)
1980–1981	FC Pakhtakor Tashkent	54	(0)
1982–1985	FC Zvezda Dzhizak	162	(44)
1986–1988	FC SKA Karpaty Lviv	106	(37)
1988	PFC CSKA Moscow	20	(3)
1989	FC SKA Karpaty Lviv	42	(7)
1990	FC Halychyna Drohobych	40	(12)
1991	FC Priborist Mukachyovo	48	(22)
1992	Kiskőrösi Petőfi Spartacus	3	(1)
1993	Bajai LSE	18	(5)
1993–1995	FC Hazovyk Komarno	61	(26)
1995–1996	KS Lublinianka	15	(0)
1998	FC Viktoriya Nazarovo	9	(1)
Total		592	(158)

Managerial career
- 1999–2000: FC Metallurg Krasnoyarsk (assistant)
- 2000: FC Metallurg Krasnoyarsk
- 2001–2006: FC Krylia Sovetov Samara (assistant)
- 2006: FC Krylia Sovetov Samara (caretaker)
- 2008–2009: FC Krylia Sovetov Samara (assistant)
- 2009: FC Krylia Sovetov Samara (caretaker)
- 2010–2015: FC Krylia Sovetov Samara (assistant)
- 2014: FC Krylia Sovetov Samara (caretaker)
- 2015: FC Lada-Togliatti
- 2018: FC Krylia Sovetov-2 Samara
- 2018–2020: FC Krylia Sovetov Samara (U-21)
- 2020–2021: FC Krylia Sovetov-2 Samara
- 2022: FC Kuban-Holding Pavlovskaya
- 2022–2023: FC Kuban-Holding Pavlovskaya (assistant)
- 2024–: FC PSK Dinskaya
- * Club domestic league appearances and goals

Vladimir Aleksandrovich Kukhlevsky (Russian: Владимир Александрович Кухлевский; born 5 January 1959) is a Russian professional football coach and a former player who is the manager of FC PSK Dinskaya.
