= Andrey Kobelev =

Russian retired footballer (born 1968)

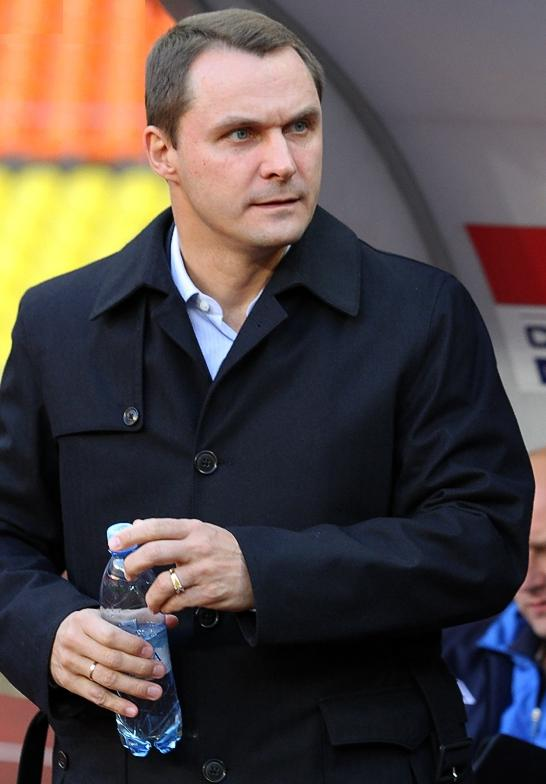
- Kobelev coaching Krylia Sovetov in 2011

Personal information
- Full name: Andrey Nikolayevich Kobelev
- Date of birth: 22 October 1968 (age 58)
- Place of birth: Moscow, Soviet Union
- Height: 1.78 m (5 ft 10 in)
- Position: Midfielder

Youth career
- 1985–1988: Dynamo Moscow

Senior career*
Years	Team	Apps	(Gls)
1988–1992	Dynamo Moscow	125	(17)
1993–1994	Betis	20	(1)
1995–1998	Dynamo Moscow	128	(29)
1999–2001	Zenit St. Petersburg	69	(9)
2002	Dynamo Moscow	10	(0)
Total		352	(56)

International career
- USSR U16
1988–1990	USSR U21		
1992	Russia	1	(0)

Managerial career
- 2004–2006: Dynamo Moscow (assistant)
- 2005: Dynamo Moscow (caretaker)
- 2006–2010: Dynamo Moscow
- 2011–2012: Krylia Sovetov
- 2015: Dynamo Moscow (director of sports)
- 2015–2016: Dynamo Moscow
- * Club domestic league appearances and goals

Andrey Nikolayevich Kobelev (Russian: Андрей Николаевич Кобелев; born 22 October 1968 in Moscow) is a Russian retired footballer who played as a midfielder and a current manager.

== Playing career ==
During his career Kobelev played for FC Dynamo Moscow (three spells, more than 250 Russian Premier League appearances and nearly 50 goals), Real Betis and FC Zenit St. Petersburg, retiring at 34. With the Spanish side, he played in two Segunda División seasons, and was still in roster for the 1994–95 campaign, but failed to compete in La Liga.

Kobelev was capped for Russia once. Additionally, he helped win the 1985 UEFA European Under-16 Football Championship and the 1990 Under-21 European Championship.

== Coaching career ==
In 2006, Kobelev took up coaching, starting with his first team Dynamo Moscow following the sacking of Yuri Semin due to poor results. On 27 April 2010 he was fired himself, being replaced by Miodrag Božović.

In June 2011, Kobelev was appointed at FC Krylia Sovetov Samara. In November of the following year, following a poor start to the season, he resigned and left his place to caretaker Aleksandr Tsygankov.

He returned to Dynamo in 2015, first as director of sports and then as a manager. Due to a string of poor results, he left the club on 10 May 2016.
