= Aleksandr Tarkhanov =

Russian footballer and coach

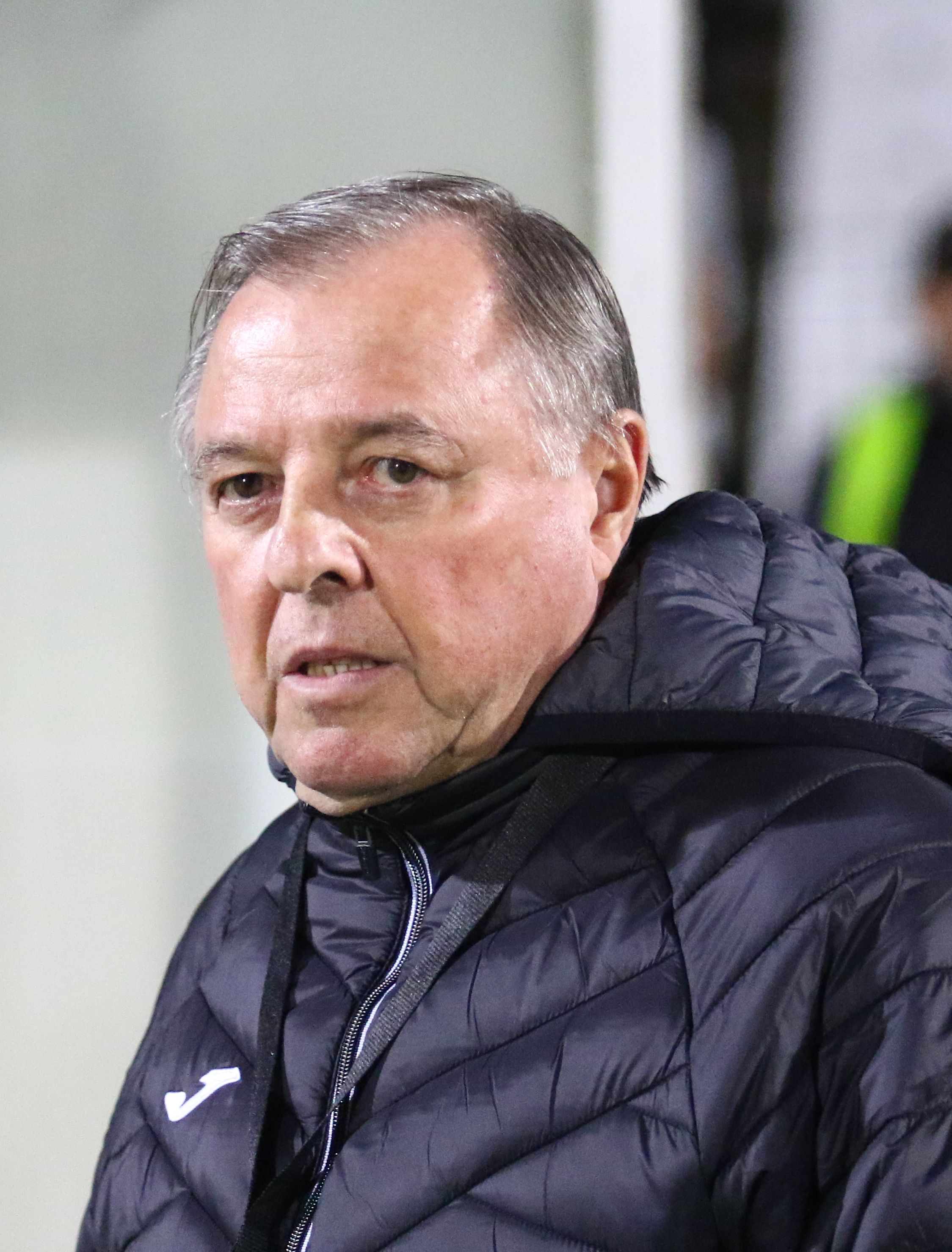

Personal information
- Full name: Aleksandr Fyodorovich Tarkhanov
- Date of birth: 6 September 1954 (age 72)
- Place of birth: Kazakhstan Station, Kazakh SSR
- Height: 1.69 m (5 ft 7 in)
- Positions: Midfielder; forward

Team information
- Current team: Yenisey-2 Krasnoyarsk (manager)

Youth career
- Avtomobilist Krasnoyarsk

Senior career*
Years	Team	Apps	(Gls)
1972–1973	Avtomobilist Krasnoyarsk		(20)
1974–1975	SKA Khabarovsk	21	(4)
1976–1984	CSKA Moscow	249	(61)
1985	SKA Odesa	37	(14)
1987–1988	SKA Rostov-on-Don	47	(6)

International career
1976–1983	USSR	6	(0)

Managerial career
- 1989: Kotayk Abovian (consultant)
- 1990: SKA Odesa
- 1991: Terek Grozny
- 1991–1992: Pakhtakor Tashkent
- 1992–1994: Spartak Moscow (assistant)
- 1994–1996: CSKA Moscow
- 1994–1996: Russia (assistant)
- 1996: CSKA Moscow (president)
- 1997–1998: Torpedo Moscow
- 1999–2003: Krylia Sovetov Samara
- 2004: Saturn Ramenskoye (assistant)
- 2004–2005: Saturn Ramenskoye
- 2005: Terek Grozny (consultant)
- 2005–2006: Terek Grozny
- 2006: Nika Moscow (assistant)
- 2006–2007: Vėtra
- 2007: Krylia Sovetov Samara
- 2008: Kuban Krasnodar
- 2008–2009: Nika Moscow (director)
- 2009: Nika Moscow (sporting director)
- 2010: Khimki
- 2010–2011: Krylia Sovetov Samara
- 2011–2012: Nika Moscow (assistant)
- 2012: Khimki
- 2013: Khimki
- 2013–2015: Ural Yekaterinburg
- 2015–2016: Slavia Sofia
- 2016–2018: Ural Yekaterinburg
- 2018–2019: Ural Yekaterinburg (advisor)
- 2019: Pyunik
- 2019–2020: Pyunik (VP)
- 2020: Yenisey Krasnoyarsk
- 2020–2021: Slavia Sofia
- 2021–2022: Pyunik (VP)
- 2025: Ural-2 Yekaterinburg
- 2026: Yenisey-2 Krasnoyarsk
- 2026: Yenisey Krasnoyarsk
- 2026–: Yenisey-2 Krasnoyarsk
- * Club domestic league appearances and goals

Aleksandr Fyodorovich Tarkhanov (Russian: Александр Фёдорович Тарханов, Kazakh: Александр Федорович Тарханов, romanized: Aleksandr Fedorovïç Tarxanov; born 6 September 1954) is a Russian football coach and a former Soviet player who is the manager of Yenisey-2 Krasnoyarsk.

== International career ==
Tarkhanov made his debut for USSR on 28 November 1976 in a friendly against Argentina. He played in a 1982 FIFA World Cup qualifier, but was not selected for the final tournament squad. He also played in one qualifier for UEFA Euro 1984 (USSR did not qualify for the final tournament).

== Coaching career ==
On 11 April 2019, he signed with the Armenian club Pyunik.

On 30 October 2019, Tarkhanov became Vice President of Development with Assistant manager Suren Chakhalyan being appointed acting Head Coach.

== Personal life ==
His son Yuri Tarkhanov is a professional football coach and a former player.
