= Yuri Krasnozhan =

Russian footballer

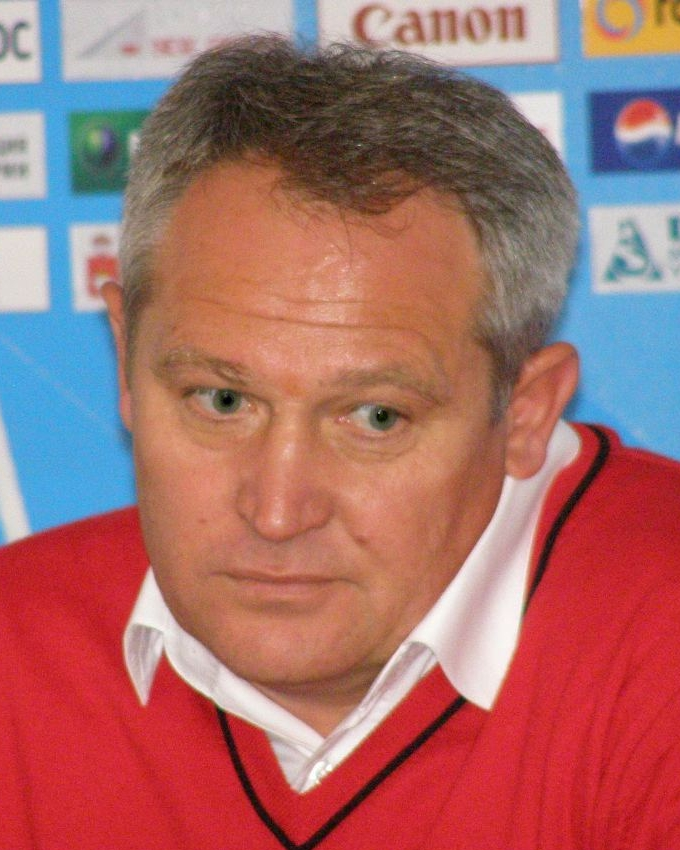

Personal information
- Full name: Yuri Anatolyevich Krasnozhan
- Date of birth: 7 June 1963 (age 63)
- Place of birth: Nalchik, Russian SFSR
- Positions: Defender; midfielder

Team information
- Current team: Russia (Women) (manager)

Senior career*
Years	Team	Apps	(Gls)
1980–1984	Spartak Nalchik	66	(1)
1985–1990	did not play		
1991–1994	Avtozapchast Baksan	88	(6)

Managerial career
- 1993: Avtozapchast Baksan (assistant)
- 1995–1997: Avtozapchast Baksan (assistant)
- 1999: Spartak Nalchik (reserves)
- 2000–2003: Spartak Nalchik (assistant)
- 2004–2010: Spartak Nalchik
- 2011: Lokomotiv Moscow
- 2011–2012: Russia-2
- 2011–2012: Anzhi Makhachakala
- 2012–2013: Kuban Krasnodar
- 2013: Terek Grozny
- 2014–2015: Kazakhstan
- 2018: Khimki
- 2020–: Russia women
- * Club domestic league appearances and goals

Yuri Anatolyevich Krasnozhan (Russian: Юрий Анатольевич Красножан; born 7 June 1963) is a Russian professional football coach and a former player. He is the manager of Russia women's national football team.

== Career ==
Born in Nalchik, Krasnozhan became the head coach of his native club Spartak Nalchik in 2004. In 2005, he managed to promote the modest club to the Russian Premier League. In spite of insufficient financing, the team avoided relegation, and nearly reached the Europa League places finishing in the 6th position in 2010. Following that season, Krasnozhan resigned to move to Lokomotiv Moscow.

On 4 June 2011, rumours spread that Lokomotiv chairman Olga Smorodskaya suspected Krasnozhan of throwing the home league game against FC Anzhi Makhachkala, played on 27 May and finished 1–2, and decided to fire him on the grounds of the suspicion. Lokomotiv was 5th in the table at that moment, just one point away from first-placed CSKA. On 6 July, after Lokomotiv Committee of Directors meeting, Krasnozhan's contract was officially terminated on the basis of "negligence in his job". Russian Football Union subsequently refused to investigate the case. On 27 December 2011, he was presented as Anzhi Makhachakala's head coach, on a 5-year deal. On 13 February 2012, before the team played a single official competitive game under his management, Krasnozhan was fired from Anzhi Makhachkala due to an unstable relationship with some players.

On 16 August 2012, he joined FC Kuban Krasnodar. On 8 January 2013, Krasnozhan was dismissed from his position after decision of the main investor.

On 26 May 2013, he was hired by FC Terek Grozny. He resigned on 28 October 2013 after Terek won only one game out of first 14 and was in 14th position in the table.

On 7 February 2014, Krasnozhan was announced as a new head coach of Kazakhstan national football team. He left in 2015.

On 9 February 2018, he signed with the Russian Football National League club FC Khimki. He left Khimki at the end of the season.

On 30 December 2020, he was hired as head coach of the Russia women's national football team.

== Managerial statistics ==
As of 8 June 2016

Team	Nat	From	To	Record				
Team	Nat	From	To	G	W	D	L	Win %
Kazakhstan	(Kazakhstan)	February 2014	2015	11	2	4	5	18.18
