= Miodrag Božović =

Montenegrin football manager (born 1968)

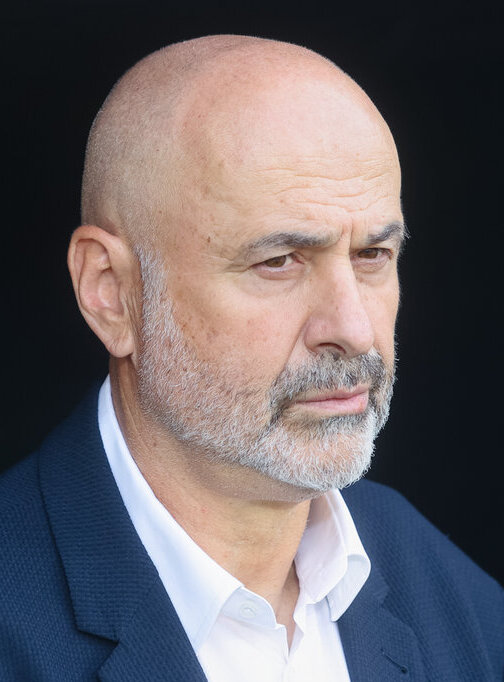
- Božović coaching Esteghlal in 2025

Personal information
- Date of birth: 22 June 1968 (age 58)
- Place of birth: Mojkovac, SR Montenegro, Yugoslavia
- Height: 1.96 m (6 ft 5 in)
- Position: Defender

Senior career*
Years	Team	Apps	(Gls)
1986–1992	Budućnost Titograd	107	(6)
1992–1994	Red Star Belgrade	52	(1)
1994–1996	Pelita Jaya	30	(1)
1996–1997	APOP Paphos	20	(1)
1997–1998	RKC Waalwijk	19	(1)
1998	Avispa Fukuoka	8	(0)
2000	RBC Roosendaal	5	(0)

International career
1990	Yugoslavia U21	1	(0)

Managerial career
- 2001–2002: Beograd
- 2002: Consadole Sapporo (assistant)
- 2003–2004: Borac Čačak
- 2004: Obilić
- 2004: Hajduk Beograd
- 2005: AEP Paphos
- 2005–2006: Borac Čačak
- 2006–2007: Budućnost Podgorica
- 2007: Grbalj
- 2007: Borac Čačak
- 2008: Amkar Perm
- 2009: FC Moscow
- 2010–2011: Dynamo Moscow
- 2011–2012: Amkar Perm
- 2012–2014: Rostov
- 2014–2015: Lokomotiv Moscow
- 2015–2017: Red Star Belgrade
- 2017–2018: Arsenal Tula
- 2018–2020: Krylia Sovetov
- 2021–2022: Arsenal Tula
- 2023–2024: Neftçi
- 2024–2025: Esteghlal Khuzestan
- 2025: Esteghlal
- 2025–2026: Budućnost Podgorica
- 2026–: Vardar
- * Club domestic league appearances and goals

Miodrag "Grof" Božović (Montenegrin: Миодраг "Гроф" Божовић, pronounced [mîodraɡ bôːʒoʋitɕ]; born 22 June 1968) is a Montenegrin football manager, former player and current manager of Macedonian Football League club Vardar.

== Playing career ==
=== Club ===
A tall central defender, Božović played alongside Yugoslav and Montenegrin legends Predrag Mijatović and Dejan Savićević at Budućnost Titograd and for fellow Yugoslav team Red Star Belgrade, whom he left in 1994 during the civil war to play in Indonesia. He also played for Dutch clubs RKC Waalwijk and RBC Roosendaal, as well as in Cyprus and Japan.

During his playing career Božović won Yugoslav Cup with Red Star Belgrade.

=== International ===
He represented his U-21 national side once.

== Managerial career ==
As a coach, he had a successful spell in Budućnost in the 2006–07 season, when his team was leading in Montenegrin First League, but he resigned and joined Grbalj in February 2007, due to the disagreement with the board. Božović also was successful in Borac Čačak, as he made a competitive team out of a humble club.

Russian side FC Amkar Perm qualified for the UEFA Europa League for the first time in club's history under his management. Next season, his new club FC Moscow was among the leaders in the Russian Premier League for long stretches, before fading in the end of the season and falling out of European qualification. In early 2010, FC Moscow dropped out of the Premier League due to financial considerations, and Božović became a free agent.

On 27 April 2010, Božović signed a three-year contract with FC Dynamo Moscow.

After the game against his former club, Amkar, he was questioned in the flash interview, did he feel that he was playing against the team he had built himself. His answer was: "I feel I was playing against players who made me a coach."

He resigned from Dynamo on 21 April 2011 after losing in a Russian Cup quarterfinal against FC Rostov (winning the Cup was the last hope for Dynamo to qualify for UEFA Europa League).

In Serbia Božović was nicknamed Grof (the Count or Earl), because of his orderly and elegant appearance.

In June 2012 he became the manager of FC Rostov. The next season Rostov won the 2013–14 Russian Cup.

=== Red Star ===
==== 2015-16 ====
On 29 May 2015 it was announced that Božović would manage his former club Red Star Belgrade. His start as Red Star manager was turbulent. Red Star was eliminated by Kairat in the first qualifying round for the Europa League and started off the regular season with a comeback win against OFK Beograd and a draw against Metalac in Gornji Milanovac in the first two rounds of the Serbian Superliga. Serbian media and journalist were not on his side and criticized him and his team's play. After a draw against Radnički Niš in front of 22.000 fans who started to chant against the club board, Božović offered his resignation. Fans were explicit in their desire that board members must leave the club right away, not him, and gave clear support to Božović. Several board members including the vice president and the general director left the club and Božović started a "little war" with the media. After the series of bad performances, Red Star dominated throughout the match and won after a comeback against Čukarički, considered the best match of the season.

Following these incidents, Božović masterminded Red Star to 24 straight wins in the regular season, a new club record, and dominated the Serbian Superliga with 32 points ahead of their rivals. With Božović at the helm Red Star made the best start in club history. Božović lead Red Star to the 27th club league title in history, and the first in his career. Božović stated that he is very happy like never before in his life.

==== 2016-17 ====
After clear and unambiguous support from Red Star fans, who were chanted his name and ask to stay, Grof Božović signed new two-year contract with Red Star to lead the club to the Champions League. Božović said that chants from the fans and whole stands of Marakana are the biggest thing which happened to him in his life, after birth of his sons. He record his first European victory, which is also Red Star first in three years and five matches in a row, against Valletta in first match of second qualifying round for the Champions League in Valletta.

=== Return to Russia ===
He signed with the Russian Premier League club FC Arsenal Tula before the 2017–18 season. He led the club to the 7th place in the 2017–18 Russian Premier League, the best position in club's history. He did not renew his Arsenal contract at the end of the season.

On 5 October 2018, he signed a 2-year contract with FC Krylia Sovetov Samara. He left Krylia Sovetov by mutual consent on 28 June 2020, with the team in the last position in the table.

On 3 September 2021, he returned to Arsenal Tula. Arsenal was relegated at the end of the 2021–22 Russian Premier League after taking last place.

=== Neftçi ===
On 24 December 2023, Božović was announced as the new Head Coach of Azerbaijan Premier League club Neftçi following the departure of Adrian Mutu.

On 26 May 2024, a day after their season finished, Neftçi announced that they would not be extending their contract with Božović.

== Other information ==
- Speaks several languages.
- As of 2023 – the record holder among foreign coaches in Russian Premier League in terms of the number of clubs led and seasons spent (7 and 11, respectively).
- The players who worked under him repeatedly noted his use of sex jokes in the training process.

== Managerial statistics ==
As of match played 12 March 2025

Managerial record by team and tenure
Team	From	To	Record				
Team	From	To	P	W	D	L	Win %
Amkar Perm	8 January 2008	31 December 2008	32	15	9	8	46.88
FC Moscow	1 January 2009	1 March 2010	34	16	9	9	47.06
Dynamo Moscow	27 April 2010	21 April 2011	31	11	11	9	35.48
Amkar Perm	29 September 2011	11 June 2012	19	9	5	5	47.37
Rostov	11 June 2012	25 September 2014	83	28	19	36	33.73
Lokomotiv Moscow	4 October 2014	11 May 2015	21	10	6	5	47.62
Red Star Belgrade	2 June 2015	7 May 2017	84	63	11	10	75.00
Arsenal Tula	18 June 2017	25 May 2018	31	12	6	13	38.71
Krylia Sovetov	5 October 2018	28 June 2020	49	13	7	29	26.53
Arsenal Tula	3 September 2021	21 June 2022	28	6	8	14	21.43
Neftçi	24 December 2023	26 May 2024	24	10	5	9	41.67
Esteghlal Khuzestan	5 July 2024	25 February 2025	21	5	8	8	23.81
Esteghlal	26 February 2025	23 April 2025	9	0	5	4	0.00
Total			462	198	107	157	42.86

== Honours ==
=== Player ===
Red Star Belgrade

- FR Yugoslavia Cup: 1992–93

=== Manager ===
Rostov

- Russian Cup: 2013–14

Red Star Belgrade

- Serbian SuperLiga: 2015–16
