= Gadzhi Gadzhiyev =

Russian football manager (born 1945)

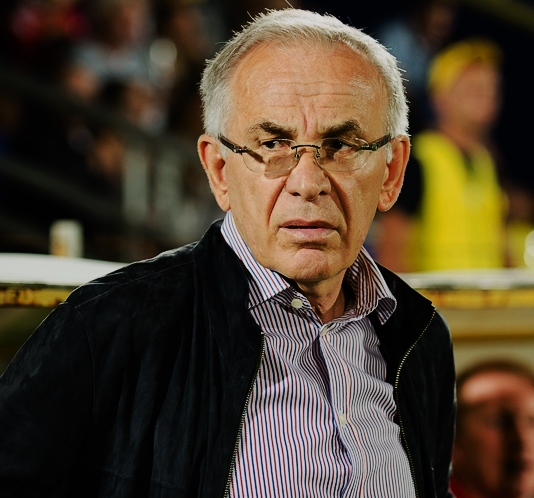
- Gadzhiyev coaching Amkar in 2015

Personal information
- Full name: Gadzhi Muslimovich Gadzhiyev
- Date of birth: 28 October 1945 (age 81)
- Place of birth: Buynaksk, Russian SFSR

Team information
- Current team: FC Dynamo Makhachkala (president)

Senior career*
Years	Team	Apps	(Gls)
1964	Spartak Leningrad		

Managerial career
- 1972–1973: Dynamo Makhachkala (Caretaker)
- 1973–1975: Dynamo Makhachkala
- 1983–1985: Neftchi Baku
- 1986–1988: USSR Olympic team (assistant)
- 1990–1992: USSR / CIS (assistant)
- 1992–1997: Russia U-21 (assistant)
- 1998–1999: Russia (assistant)
- 1999–2001: Anzhi Makhachkala
- 2002: Sanfrecce Hiroshima
- 2002: Fakel Voronezh (consultant)
- 2002–2003: Anzhi Makhachkala
- 2003: Anzhi Makhachkala
- 2003–2006: Krylya Sovetov
- 2007–2008: Saturn Ramenskoye
- 2010–2011: Anzhi Makhachkala
- 2012–2013: Volga Nizhny Novgorod
- 2013: Krylia Sovetov Samara
- 2013–2014: Anzhi Makhachkala
- 2015–2018: Amkar Perm
- 2019–: Dynamo Makhachkala (president)
- * Club domestic league appearances and goals

Gadzhi Muslimovich Gadzhiyev (Russian: Гаджи Муслимович Гаджиев; born 28 October 1945) is a Russian football manager who is the president of FC Dynamo Makhachkala.

== Managerial career ==
He was assistant coach to the Soviet Union side which won gold at the 1988 Seoul Olympics, and an assistant coach of the USSR national football team in 1990–1992. His management career has included spells in charge of FC Krylya Sovetov Samara, Sanfrecce Hiroshima (2002) and FC Saturn Moscow Oblast.

== Managerial statistics ==
Team	From	To	Record				
Team	From	To	G	W	D	L	Win %
Sanfrecce Hiroshima	2002	2002	7	2	1	4	28.57
Total			7	2	1	4	28.57

== Personal life ==
His son Shamil Gadzhiyev is a professional footballer.
