= 2011–12 Russian Premier League =

20th season of top-tier football league in Russia

Russian Premier League
- Season: 2011–12
- Champions: Zenit St. Petersburg
- Relegated: Spartak Nalchik; Tom Tomsk
- Champions League: Zenit St. Petersburg; Spartak Moscow
- Europa League: CSKA Moscow; Dynamo Moscow; Anzhi Makhachkala; Rubin Kazan
- Matches: 232
- Goals: 567 (2.44 per match)
- Top goalscorer: Seydou Doumbia (28)
- Biggest home win: Kuban 5–0 Volga; Zenit 5–0 Krasnodar
- Biggest away win: CSKA 0–4 Dynamo; Terek 0–4 Lokomotiv; Tom 0–4 Krasnodar; Dynamo 1–5 Zenit
- Highest scoring: Dynamo 6–2 Terek; Anzhi 3–5 CSKA

The 2011–12 Russian Premier League was the 20th season of the Russian football championship since the dissolution of the Soviet Union and 10th under the current Russian Premier League name. The season began on 12 March 2011. The last matches were played on 22 May 2012, as the league switched to an autumn-spring rhythm. Zenit were the defending champions, and managed to successfully defend their title.

== Competition modus changes ==
The 2011–12 season is a transitional season, as it will stretch over 18 months instead of the conventional 12 months. The unusual length of the season is the result of the decision to adapt the playing year to an autumn-spring rhythm similar to most of the other UEFA leagues.

The season will comprise two phases. The first phase will consist of a regular home-and-away schedule, meaning that each team will play the other teams twice for a total of 30 matches per team. The league will then be split into two groups for the second phase, where each team plays another home-and-away schedule against every other team of its respective group.

The top eight teams of the first phase will compete for the championship and the spots for both the 2012–13 Champions League and Europa League. Accordingly, the bottom eight teams will have to avoid relegation. The bottom two teams of this group will be directly relegated, while the 13th- and 14-placed teams will compete in a relegation/promotion playoff with the third- and fourth-placed teams of the 2011–12 National League Championship.

== Teams ==
Alania Vladikavkaz and Sibir Novosibirsk were relegated at the end of the 2010 season after finishing the season in the bottom two places. Both teams returned to the First Division, rechristened the National League Championship starting with the 2011–12 season, after just one year.

The relegated teams were replaced by 2010 First Division champions Kuban Krasnodar and runners-up Volga Nizhny Novgorod. Kuban made their immediate return to the Premier League, while Volga is playing their first season at the highest football level of Russia.

In further team changes, Saturn Moscow Oblast was forced to withdraw from the league due to financial reasons. The club did not return at any level of Russian football in the 2011–12 season, as the club was eventually disbanded after amassing debts of RUB 800m. Their former farm club, FC Saturn-2 Moscow Oblast, participates in the Russian Second Division in 2011. Amkar Perm, who originally requested to withdraw as well, revoked this request on 24 January 2011.

In a meeting on 25 January 2011, an extraordinary general meeting of Premier League clubs decided to replace Saturn with FC Krasnodar, the fifth-placed team from the 2010 First Division. Similar to Volga Nizhny Novgorod, Krasnodar made their debut at the Premier League.

Locations of teams in the 2011–12 Russian Premier League

Team	Location	Head coach	Team captain	Venue	Capacity	2010	Kit Maker	Shirt Sponsor
Amkar	Perm	(Montenegro) Miodrag Božović	(Russia) Dmitri Belorukov	Zvezda	19,500	14th	Puma	
Anzhi	Makhachkala	(Netherlands) Guus Hiddink	(Cameroon) Samuel Eto'o	Dynamo	16,863	11th	adidas	Podari Zhizn
CSKA	Moscow	(Russia) Leonid Slutsky	(Russia) Igor Akinfeev	Luzhniki	78,360	2nd	Reebok	Bashneft
Dynamo	Moscow	(Russia) Sergei Silkin	(Ukraine) Andriy Voronin	Arena Khimki	20,000	7th	adidas	VTB
Krasnodar	Krasnodar	(Serbia) Slavoljub Muslin	(Georgia (country)) Aleksandr Amisulashvili	Kuban	35,200	D1 5th	Kappa	Home Credit Bank
Krylia Sovetov	Samara	(Russia) Andrei Kobelev	(Russia) Ivan Taranov	Metallurg	33,001	13th	Umbro	Volgospetsstroy
Kuban	Krasnodar	(Romania) Dan Petrescu	(Brazil) Zelão	Kuban	35,200	D1 1st	Nike	RGMK
Lokomotiv	Moscow	(Portugal) José Couceiro	(Russia) Dmitri Loskov	Lokomotiv (Moscow)	28,810	5th	Puma	RZD
Rostov	Rostov-on-Don	(Russia) Anatoly Baidachny	(Russia) Roman Adamov	Olimp-2	15,842	9th	Puma/Joma	
Rubin	Kazan	(Turkmenistan) Kurban Berdyev	(Russia) Roman Sharonov	Central Stadium	27,434	3rd	Umbro	TAIF
Spartak Moscow	Moscow	(Russia) Valeri Karpin	(Russia) Sergei Parshivlyuk	Luzhniki	78,360	4th	Nike	Lukoil
Spartak Nalchik	Nalchik	(Russia) Timur Shipshev (caretaker)	(Montenegro) Miodrag Džudović	Spartak	14,194	6th	Umbro	Sindika
Terek	Grozny	(Russia) Stanislav Cherchesov	(Russia) Rizvan Utsiyev	Terek Stadium	30,000	12th	adidas	Fond Akhmad Kadyrov
Tom	Tomsk	(Russia) Sergei Perednya	(Russia) Denis Boyarintsev	Trud	14,950	8th	adidas	Rosneft
Volga	Nizhny Novgorod	(Russia) Dmitri Cheryshev	(Russia) Aleksandr Belozyorov	Lokomotiv (Nizhny Novgorod)	17,856	D1 2nd	Puma	MRSK
Zenit	St. Petersburg	(Italy) Luciano Spalletti	(Russia) Vyacheslav Malafeev	Petrovskiy	21,570	1st	Nike	Gazprom

=== Managerial changes ===
Team	Outgoing	Manner	Date	Table	Incoming	Date	Table
Krasnodar	(Russia) Sergei Tashuyev	mutual consensus	7 November 2010	5th (D1)	(Serbia) Slavoljub Muslin	28 December 2010	pre-season
Spartak Nalchik	(Russia) Yuri Krasnozhan	end of contract	29 November 2010	6th	(Russia) Vladimir Eshtrekov	3 December 2010	pre-season
Lokomotiv	(Russia) Yuri Semin	sacked	1 December 2010	5th	(Russia) Yuri Krasnozhan	14 December 2010	pre-season
Terek	(Russia) Anatoly Baidachny	contract expired	22 December 2010	12th	(Spain) Víctor Muñoz	22 December 2010	pre-season
Terek	(Spain) Víctor Muñoz	mutual consensus	15 January 2011	pre-season	(Netherlands) Ruud Gullit	18 January 2011	pre-season
Dynamo Moscow	(Montenegro) Miodrag Božović	mutual consent	21 April 2011	9th	(Russia) Sergei Silkin	21 April 2011	9th
Rostov	(Ukraine) Oleh Protasov	resigned	13 May 2011	12th	(Ukraine) Volodymyr Lyutyi (caretaker)	13 May 2011	12th
Lokomotiv	(Russia) Yuri Krasnozhan	sacked	6 June 2011	5th	(Uzbekistan) Vladimir Maminov (caretaker)	7 June 2011	5th
Terek	(Netherlands) Ruud Gullit	sacked	14 June 2011	14th	(Russia) Isa Baytiyev (caretaker)	15 June 2011	14th
Spartak Nalchik	(Russia) Vladimir Eshtrekov	sacked	15 June 2011	16th	(Russia) Sergei Tashuyev	16 June 2011	16th
Volga	(Russia) Omari Tetradze	sacked	16 June 2011	12th	(Russia) Dmitri Cheryshev	16 June 2011	12th
Rostov	(Ukraine) Volodymyr Lyutyi (caretaker)	sacked	20 June 2011	14th	(Russia) Andrei Talalayev (caretaker)	20 June 2011	14th
Krylia Sovetov	(Russia) Aleksandr Tarkhanov	sacked	28 June 2011	16th	(Russia) Andrei Kobelev	30 June 2011	16th
Rostov	(Russia) Andrei Talalayev (caretaker)	caretaking spell over	1 July 2011	14th	(Russia) Sergei Balakhnin	1 July 2011	14th
Lokomotiv	(Uzbekistan) Vladimir Maminov (caretaker)	caretaking spell over	1 July 2011	8th	(Portugal) José Couceiro	1 July 2011	8th
Tom	(Russia) Valeri Nepomniachi	resigned	19 September 2011	14th	(Russia) Vasili Baskakov (caretaker)	19 September 2011	14th
Tom	(Russia) Vasili Baskakov (caretaker)	caretaking spell over	27 September 2011	14th	(Russia) Sergei Perednya (caretaker)	27 September 2011	14th
Terek	(Russia) Isa Baytiyev (caretaker)	caretaking spell over	27 September 2011	11th	(Russia) Stanislav Cherchesov	27 September 2011	11th
Amkar	(Russia) Rashid Rakhimov	sacked	27 September 2011	13th	(Montenegro) Miodrag Božović	29 September 2011	13th
Anzhi	(Russia) Gadzhi Gadzhiyev	sacked	29 September 2011	7th	(Russia) Andrei Gordeyev (caretaker)	29 September 2011	8th
Anzhi	(Russia) Andrei Gordeyev (caretaker)	caretaking spell over	27 December 2011	8th	(Russia) Yuri Krasnozhan	27 December 2011	8th
Anzhi	(Russia) Yuri Krasnozhan	resigned	13 February 2012	8th	(Russia) Andrei Gordeyev (caretaker)	13 February 2012	8th
Anzhi	(Russia) Andrei Gordeyev (caretaker)	caretaking spell over	17 February 2012	8th	(Netherlands) Guus Hiddink	17 February 2012	8th
Spartak Nalchik	(Russia) Sergei Tashuyev	resigned	7 April 2012	16th	(Russia) Timur Shipshev (caretaker)	7 April 2012	16th
Rostov	(Russia) Sergei Balakhnin	sacked	18 April 2012	12th	(Russia) Anatoly Baidachny	18 April 2012	12th

== Season events ==
=== Grigoryev affair ===
In early 2011, the contracts of three young FC Spartak Moscow players (Maksim Grigoryev, Dmitri Malyaka and Yevgeni Filippov) expired, and they decided to switch to FC Rostov. According to Russian football regulations, when a player under 23 years of age who was raised in the club system transfers to a different club after his contract expires, his old club is due compensation from his new club. If the new club plays on the third level (Russian Second Division), the compensation is the player's 5 previous years' salary multiplied by 1, if his new club is in the National League Championship, it's multiplied by 2 and if it's a Russian Premier League club, it's multiplied by 3. The three players signed with a Russian Second Division team FC MITOS Novocherkassk who immediately loaned them to the Russian Premier League team FC Rostov. Spartak lodged a complaint with the Russian Football Union, claiming this was not a fair transfer as the only reason for it was to lower the compensation that FC Rostov was due to pay Spartak. After the protest was declined on 29 March 2011, Grigoryev was registered for FC Rostov and scored a goal on his debut against FC Lokomotiv Moscow on 2 April 2011, the game ended with a score of 1–1. FC Lokomotiv's president, Olga Smorodskaya, filed a complaint with the Russian Football Union and Premier League, claiming Grigoryev was not eligible to be registered and play for FC Rostov. Before the protest was heard, Grigoryev scored a goal in Rostov's 2–1 victory over FC Dynamo Moscow in the 2010–11 Russian Cup quarterfinal. The protest was heard by the RFU's Dispute Resolution Chamber on 21 April 2011. Smorodskaya insisted that FC MITOS did not have the transfer certificate from Spartak in their possession before the transfer deadline and therefore could not have legally registered Grigoryev. The protest was declined as, according to the league, Grigoryev et al. were registered with RFPL before the transfer deadline, even though they were not included on the official rosters on the league's website or in any other sources. The official league website actually still lists the date of their registration as 1 April. In another twist, in January 2012, Lokomotiv signed Grigoryev from FC MITOS. In March 2012, Court of Arbitration for Sport began considering Grigoryev's case. CAS made their decision in May 2012, denying Lokomotiv's appeal.

=== Zenit St. Petersburg - CSKA affair ===
According to the league regulations, every team has to put at least one player with a Russian citizenship born in 1990 or later on their game roster in every game (even if the player in question stays on the bench). If there is no such player or players, the team guilty is punished by the victory being awarded to their opponent and a fine. In the game against PFC CSKA Moscow on 10 April 2011, Zenit St. Petersburg did not have such a player in their lineup (the game ended in 1–1 draw). The youngest player was born in 1989. After the game, Russian Football Union president Sergei Fursenko said that Zenit would likely be awarded a defeat for breaking the regulations. Zenit manager Luciano Spalletti said after the game that they did this intentionally, as they were told it is punishable by a fine only, and the team was ready to pay the fine. They have done the same thing in the 2010 season and fine was the only punishment. However, the regulations were updated in December 2010, and the current exact language of Article 109 of the Disciplinary Regulations of the RFU states it is punishable by "a defeat awarded and a fine", not "a defeat awarded or a fine". Zenit was awarded a defeat by the RFU on 13 April. Zenit removed Vladislav Radimov, who as team director was responsible for filing the game roster with the league, from his position to the reserve team's assistant coach position, with a reduction in salary. Zenit's lawyer was punished by the club by having his bonus cancelled.

Following the RFU decision, the Premier League further decided that the goals scored by Mark González and Konstantin Zyryanov would not count for their scoring totals, but the yellow cards received in the game would count for disciplinary purposes.

=== Dejan Radić and Sergei Narubin injuries ===
On 23 April 2011 during a FC Rostov - FC Terek Grozny game, Rostov goalkeeper Dejan Radić collided with Terek's Zaur Sadayev fighting for a high ball. He had to be rushed into the hospital and after it was discovered that his kidney is seriously injured, he had to undergo nephrectomy (surgical removal of a kidney). His club, FC Rostov, announced that he will continue to receive all the bonuses he would have received if he was able to play as a starter during the time of his recovery. Former Russian international Valeri Minko, who played more than 200 games after undergoing nephrectomy himself after an in-game collision, said he expects Radić to fully recover and play again. Despite Rostov's initial promises, Radić stopped getting paid by Rostov in June 2011 and have not received any money stipulated in his contract from that time until March 2012. Terek and Chechnya's president Ramzan Kadyrov have paid him $50,000 as a goodwill gesture.

On 21 May 2011 FC Amkar Perm goalkeeper Sergei Narubin was seriously injured in a collision with FC Rostov's Kornel Saláta. He had to undergo splenectomy (surgical removal of the spleen).

=== Tom Tomsk futility record ===
FC Tom Tomsk was not able to score a single goal in 12 consecutive games from game day 18 (30 July) to game day 29 (30 October), they played 1166 minutes of game time without scoring a goal. They finally scored on the last game day of the first stage on 5 November. They only gained 1 point in those 12 games; when the series started, they were 9th in the league in goals scored with 18 goals in 17 games. The previous mark was set by FC Lokomotiv Moscow who could not score for 10 consecutive games and 943 minutes in the 1954 Soviet Top League. The record was marked by Guinness World Records as "Longest football (soccer) goalless streak".

== First phase ==
=== League table ===
Pos	Team	Pld	W	D	L	GF	GA	GD	Pts	Qualification
1	Zenit St. Petersburg	30	17	10	3	59	25	+34	61	Qualification to Championship group
2	CSKA Moscow	30	16	11	3	58	29	+29	59	Qualification to Championship group
3	Dynamo Moscow	30	16	7	7	51	30	+21	55	Qualification to Championship group
4	Spartak Moscow	30	15	8	7	48	33	+15	53 (Note: Spartak Moscow ahead of Lokomotiv Moscow on head-to-head points; Lokomotiv Moscow–Spartak Moscow 0–2, Spartak Moscow–Lokomotiv Moscow 3–0.)	Qualification to Championship group
5	Lokomotiv Moscow	30	15	8	7	49	30	+19	53	Qualification to Championship group
6	Kuban Krasnodar	30	14	7	9	38	27	+11	49	Qualification to Championship group
7	Rubin Kazan	30	13	10	7	40	27	+13	49	Qualification to Championship group
8	Anzhi Makhachkala	30	13	9	8	38	32	+6	48	Qualification to Championship group
9	Krasnodar	30	10	8	12	38	43	−5	38	Qualification to Relegation group
10	Rostov	30	8	8	14	31	45	−14	32	Qualification to Relegation group
11	Terek Grozny	30	8	7	15	29	45	−16	31	Qualification to Relegation group
12	Volga Nizhny Novgorod	30	8	4	18	24	40	−16	28	Qualification to Relegation group
13	Amkar Perm	30	6	9	15	20	39	−19	27 (Note: Amkar Perm ahead of Krylia Sovetov on head-to-head points; Amkar Perm–Krylia Sovetov 1–1, Krylia Sovetov–Amkar Perm 1–1.)	Qualification to Relegation group
14	Krylia Sovetov Samara	30	6	9	15	21	43	−22	27	Qualification to Relegation group
15	Spartak Nalchik	30	5	9	16	23	40	−17	24	Qualification to Relegation group
16	Tom Tomsk	30	4	8	18	19	58	−39	20	Qualification to Relegation group

Source: Russian Premier League
Rules for classification: 1) points; 2) number of wins; 3) head-to-head points; 4) number of head-to-head wins; 5) head-to-head goal difference; 6) number of head-to-head goals scored; 7) number of head-to-head away goals scored; 8) goal difference; 9) number of goals scored; 10) number of away goals scored.

=== Results ===
Home \ Away	AMK	ANZ	CSK	DYN	KRA	KRY	KUB	LOK	ROS	RUB	SPA	SPN	TER	TOM	VNN	ZEN
Amkar Perm		0–0	0–2	0–0	0–2	1–1	3–1	1–0	0–1	1–1	0–1	1–0	1–0	1–2	1–0	1–3
Anzhi Makhachkala	2–1		3–5	2–1	0–0	3–1	0–0	0–1	1–0	1–0	2–1	2–0	2–2	2–0	2–1	0–1
CSKA Moscow	2–0	3–0		0–4	1–1	2–1	1–1	3–1	2–1	2–0	0–1	4–0	2–2	3–0	3–1	0–2
Dynamo Moscow	3–0	2–2	2–2		2–1	1–0	1–0	4–1	3–1	0–2	1–1	2–0	6–2	3–0	2–0	1–1
Krasnodar	1–0	2–2	1–1	0–1		1–2	0–2	1–4	2–0	3–1	2–4	2–0	0–2	2–2	4–2	0–0
Krylia Sovetov Samara	1–1	0–3	0–3	1–0	0–0		1–0	1–0	2–2	2–2	0–1	0–2	2–1	2–0	0–0	2–5
Kuban Krasnodar	3–2	1–0	0–0	3–1	0–1	1–1		0–1	2–0	0–2	3–1	1–1	2–1	1–3	5–0	1–1
Lokomotiv Moscow	4–0	1–2	1–1	3–2	1–0	0–0	2–1		1–1	1–1	0–2	3–1	4–0	3–0	1–0	4–2
Rostov	3–0	1–1	1–1	0–2	1–3	1–0	1–2	0–3		1–3	4–0	0–0	1–0	2–1	1–3	1–3
Rubin Kazan	1–1	0–3	1–1	3–0	2–1	1–0	0–2	0–0	1–1		3–0	0–0	2–0	4–1	2–0	2–3
Spartak Moscow	1–2	3–0	2–2	0–2	4–0	3–0	1–1	3–0	3–2	0–0		1–0	0–0	4–0	1–0	2–2
Spartak Nalchik	2–1	1–1	0–2	2–3	2–2	1–0	0–1	1–2	0–1	0–1	1–1		2–2	1–2	1–1	2–2
Terek Grozny	1–0	1–0	2–4	0–0	2–0	2–0	1–2	0–4	1–1	0–1	2–4	0–1		2–0	1–0	0–1
Tom Tomsk	0–0	0–0	1–1	0–2	0–4	1–1	0–1	2–2	1–1	0–2	1–1	0–2	0–1		0–3	2–1
Volga Nizhny Novgorod	0–0	1–2	0–2	3–0	0–2	2–0	0–1	0–0	0–1	1–0	0–2	1–0	3–1	2–0		0–2
Zenit St. Petersburg	1–1	2–0	0–3 (Note: Zenit received a 0–3 loss in a home game against CSKA due to violation of regulations.)	0–0	5–0	3–0	1–0	1–1	4–0	2–2	3–0	1–0	0–0	4–0	3–0	

Source: Russian Premier League
Legend: Blue = home team win; Yellow = draw; Red = away team win.

=== First phase top goalscorers ===
Rank	Scorer	Goals (Pen.)	Team
1	(Ivory Coast) Seydou Doumbia	23	CSKA
2	(Russia) Aleksandr Kerzhakov	16 (1)	Zenit
3	(Ivory Coast) Lacina Traoré	14 (4)	Kuban
4	(Ukraine) Andriy Voronin	11	Dynamo
4	(Serbia) Danko Lazović	11 (3)	Zenit
6	(Germany) Kevin Kurányi	10	Dynamo
6	(Russia) Igor Semshov	10	Dynamo
8	(Russia) Sergei Davydov	9 (1)	Kuban
9	(Portugal) Danny	8	Zenit
9	(Brazil) Vágner Love	8	CSKA
9	(Russia) Pavel Golyshev	8 (2)	Tom

Last updated: 6 November 2011
Source: Russian Premier League

== Second phase ==
After the first 30 fixtures, teams were split into two groups of eight which play against each other on a home-and-away basis. Fixtures 31 and 32 were scheduled to be held on the weekends of the 3rd and the 4th weeks of November 2011 respectively. Fixture 33 will take place on 3–4 March 2012. The matches of Fixture 44 (the last one) will start simultaneously at 11 a.m. GMT on 13 May 2012. Russian Football Union decided to set up the calendar for the championship group manually, instead of the computer draw. The computer draw will be done only for the relegation group. The final version of the second phase calendar became available on 7 November 2011.

=== Championship group ===
The top eight teams of the first phase participate in this group, which will decide which team will win the championship. Additionally, teams in this group compete for two 2012–13 Champions League and three Europa League spots.

The winners will qualify for the Champions League group stage, with the runners-up earning a spot in the third qualifying round. Furthermore, the third-placed team will qualify for the play-off round of the Europa League, with the fourth- and fifth-placed teams earning spots in the third qualifying round and second qualifying round, respectively.

An additional Europa League play-off round spot is awarded to the winners of the 2011–12 Russian Cup. However, depending on the final league placement of both finalists, the allocation of all four Europa League spots may vary according to the table below.

Positions of Cup finalists		Allocation of Europa League spots			
Cup winners	Cup runners-up	GS	PO	QR3	QR2
1st	2nd	3rd	4th	5th	6th
1st or 2nd	3rd, 4th or 5th	3rd	4th	5th	6th
1st or 2nd	6th or lower	3rd	4th	5th	Cup runners–up
3rd	any other place	Cup winners	4th	5th	6th
4th	any other place	Cup winners	3rd	5th	6th
5th	any other place	Cup winners	3rd	4th	6th
6th or lower	any other place	Cup winners	3rd	4th	5th

==== Championship group table ====
Pos	Team	Pld	W	D	L	GF	GA	GD	Pts	Qualification
1	Zenit St. Petersburg (C)	44	24	16	4	85	40	+45	88	Qualification to Champions League group stage
2	Spartak Moscow	44	21	12	11	69	47	+22	75	Qualification to Champions League play-off round
3	CSKA Moscow	44	19	16	9	72	47	+25	73	Qualification to Europa League play-off round
4	Dynamo Moscow	44	20	12	12	66	50	+16	72	Qualification to Europa League third qualifying round
5	Anzhi Makhachkala	44	19	13	12	54	42	+12	70	Qualification to Europa League second qualifying round
6	Rubin Kazan	44	17	17	10	55	41	+14	68	Qualification to Europa League group stage (Note: Rubin have won the 2011–12 Russian Cup and thus have qualified for the group stage of the 2012–13 UEFA Europa League.)
7	Lokomotiv Moscow	44	18	12	14	59	48	+11	66	
8	Kuban Krasnodar	44	15	16	13	50	45	+5	61	

Source: Russian Premier League
Rules for classification: 1) points; 2) number of wins; 3) head-to-head points; 4) number of head-to-head wins; 5) head-to-head goal difference; 6) number of head-to-head goals scored; 7) number of head-to-head away goals scored; 8) goal difference; 9) number of goals scored; 10) number of away goals scored
(C) Champions

==== Championship group results ====
Home \ Away	ANZ	CSK	DYN	KUB	LOK	RUB	SPA	ZEN
Anzhi Makhachkala		2–1	0–1	2–0	3–1	3–1	0–0	0–2
CSKA Moscow	0–0		1–1	0–0	0–2	1–2	2–1	2–2
Dynamo Moscow	0–1	1–0		2–1	2–2	1–1	1–3	1–5
Kuban Krasnodar	2–2	1–1	1–1		1–1	1–0	1–1	2–2
Lokomotiv Moscow	1–0	0–3	0–2	2–0		0–0	0–2	0–1
Rubin Kazan	1–0	3–1	2–0	1–1	0–0		1–1	2–2
Spartak Moscow	0–3	1–2	1–1	2–0	2–0	2–0		1–2
Zenit St. Petersburg	0–0	2–0	2–1	1–1	2–1	1–1	2–3	

Source: Russian Premier League
Legend: Blue = home team win; Yellow = draw; Red = away team win.

==== Championship group top goalscorers ====
#	Scorer	Goals (Pen.)	Team
1	(Ivory Coast) Seydou Doumbia	28 (2)	CSKA
2	(Russia) Aleksandr Kerzhakov	23 (3)	Zenit
3	(Ivory Coast) Lacina Traoré	18 (4)	Kuban
4	(Nigeria) Emmanuel Emenike	13	Spartak Moscow
4	(Germany) Kevin Kurányi	13	Dynamo
4	(Cameroon) Samuel Eto'o	13 (2)	Anzhi
7	(Russia) Igor Semshov	12	Dynamo
7	(Serbia) Danko Lazović	12 (3)	Zenit
9	(Russia) Artyom Dzyuba	11	Spartak Moscow
9	(Ukraine) Andriy Voronin	11	Dynamo
9	(Russia) Denis Glushakov	11 (2)	Lokomotiv

Last updated: 13 May 2012
Source: Russian Premier League

=== Relegation group ===
The bottom eight teams of the first phase will determine the teams to be relegated to the 2012–13 National League Championship. The bottom two teams of this group will be directly relegated, while the fifth- and sixth-placed teams will have to compete in relegation/promotion playoffs with the third- and fourth-placed teams of the 2011–12 National League Championship.

==== Relegation group table ====
Pos	Team	Pld	W	D	L	GF	GA	GD	Pts	Qualification or relegation
9	Krasnodar	44	16	13	15	58	61	−3	61	
10	Amkar Perm	44	14	13	17	40	51	−11	55	
11	Terek Grozny	44	14	10	20	45	62	−17	52	
12	Krylia Sovetov Samara	44	12	15	17	33	50	−17	51	
13	Rostov (O)	44	12	12	20	45	61	−16	48	Qualification to Relegation play-offs
14	Volga Nizhny Novgorod (O)	44	12	5	27	37	60	−23	41	Qualification to Relegation play-offs
15	Tom Tomsk (R)	44	8	13	23	30	70	−40	37	Relegation to Football National League
16	Spartak Nalchik (R)	44	7	13	24	39	60	−21	34	Relegation to Football National League

Source: Russian Premier League
Rules for classification: 1) points; 2) number of wins; 3) head-to-head points; 4) number of head-to-head wins; 5) head-to-head goal difference; 6) number of head-to-head goals scored; 7) number of head-to-head away goals scored; 8) goal difference; 9) number of goals scored; 10) number of away goals scored
(O) Play-off winners; (R) Relegated

==== Relegation group results ====
Home \ Away	AMK	KRA	KRY	ROS	SPN	TER	TOM	VNN
Amkar Perm		2–2	2–1	1–0	1–0	2–0	0–0	4–1
Krasnodar	0–1		0–2	1–0	3–2	1–3	3–1	2–1
Krylia Sovetov Samara	2–1	1–1		2–1	1–0	1–1	1–0	1–0
Rostov	1–1	1–1	1–0		2–1	1–1	3–1	1–0
Spartak Nalchik	1–2	3–3	0–0	2–2		3–0	0–2	3–0
Terek Grozny	3–1	0–1	0–0	1–0	2–0		1–0	1–3
Tom Tomsk	0–0	0–0	0–0	2–1	1–1	3–0		1–0
Volga Nizhny Novgorod	1–2	1–2	0–0	2–0	1–0	1–3	2–0	

Source: Russian Premier League
Legend: Blue = home team win; Yellow = draw; Red = away team win.

==== Relegation group top goalscorers ====
#	Scorer	Goals (Pen.)	Team
1	(Armenia) Yura Movsisyan	14 (5)	Krasnodar
2	(Russia) Roman Adamov	11 (2)	Rostov
3	(Russia) Pavel Golyshev	10 (2)	Tom/Krasnodar
3	(Belarus) Sergei Kornilenko	10 (2)	Krylia Sovetov
5	(Brazil) Maurício	9 (2)	Terek
6	(Russia) Yevgeni Shipitsin	8	Krasnodar
6	(Russia) Shamil Asildarov	8 (1)	Terek
6	(Georgia (country)) Otar Martsvaladze	8 (1)	Volga/Krasnodar

Last updated: 13 May 2012
Source: Russian Premier League

== Relegation play-offs ==
=== First leg ===
18 May 2012
18:00 MST

FC Rostov	3 – 0	FC Shinnik Yaroslavl
Cociș 8'; Kirichenko 45'; Adamov 70'	Summary

Olimp – 2
Attendance: 8,950

18 May 2012
20:00 MST

FC Volga Nizhny Novgorod	2 – 1	FC Nizhny Novgorod
Maksimov 61', 65'	Summary	Salugin 32'

Lokomotiv Stadium
Attendance: 7,150

=== Second leg ===
22 May 2012
17:00 MST

FC Nizhny Novgorod	0 – 0	FC Volga Nizhny Novgorod

FC Volga Nizhny Novgorod won 2–1 on aggregate.

22 May 2012
20:00 MST

FC Shinnik Yaroslavl	0 – 1	FC Rostov
		Adamov 90'

FC Rostov won 4–0 on aggregate.

== Awards ==
On 15 May 2012 Russian Football Union named its list of 33 top players:

Goalkeepers

1. (Russia) Vyacheslav Malafeev (Zenit)
2. (Russia) Igor Akinfeev (CSKA)
3. (Russia) Anton Shunin (Dynamo)

Right backs

1. (Russia) Aleksandr Anyukov (Zenit)
2. (Russia) Aleksei Berezutskiy (CSKA)
3. (Russia) Roman Shishkin (Lokomotiv)

Right-centre backs

1. (Russia) Sergei Ignashevich (CSKA)
2. (Slovakia) Tomáš Hubočan (Zenit)
3. (Russia) Taras Burlak (Lokomotiv)

Left-centre backs

1. (Belgium) Nicolas Lombaerts (Zenit)
2. (Russia) Vasili Berezutskiy (CSKA)
3. (Italy) Salvatore Bocchetti (Rubin)

Left backs

1. (Italy) Domenico Criscito (Zenit)
2. (Argentina) Cristian Ansaldi (Rubin)
3. (Russia) Vladimir Granat (Dynamo)

Defensive midfielders

1. (Russia) Igor Denisov (Zenit)
2. (Russia) Denis Glushakov (Lokomotiv)
3. (Israel) Bibras Natcho (Rubin)

Right wingers

1. (Russia) Aleksandr Samedov (Dynamo)
2. (Republic of Ireland) Aiden McGeady (Spartak M.)
3. (Turkey) Gökdeniz Karadeniz (Rubin)

Central midfielders

1. (Russia) Roman Shirokov (Zenit)
2. (Russia) Alan Dzagoev (CSKA)
3. (Morocco) Mbark Boussoufa (Anzhi)

Left wingers

1. (Russia) Yuri Zhirkov (Anzhi)
2. (Portugal) Danny (Zenit)
3. (Russia) Dmitri Kombarov (Spartak M.)

Right forwards

1. (Russia) Aleksandr Kerzhakov (Zenit)
2. (Cameroon) Samuel Eto'o (Anzhi)
3. (Nigeria) Emmanuel Emenike (Spartak M.)

Left forwards

1. (Ivory Coast) Seydou Doumbia (CSKA)
2. (Ivory Coast) Lacina Traoré (Kuban)
3. (Ukraine) Andriy Voronin (Dynamo)

== Medal squads ==
1. FC Zenit St. Petersburg

Goalkeepers: Vyacheslav Malafeev (41), (Belarus) Yuri Zhevnov (4), Dmitri Borodin (1).
Defenders: (Belgium) Nicolas Lombaerts (40 / 1), Aleksandr Anyukov (37 / 1), (Portugal) Bruno Alves (36), (Slovakia) Tomáš Hubočan (30), (Italy) Domenico Criscito (24 / 1), (Serbia) Aleksandar Luković (19 / 1), Igor Cheminava (3), (Portugal) Fernando Meira (1), Denis Terentyev (1).
Midfielders: Konstantin Zyryanov (41 / 2), Igor Denisov (40 / 1), Viktor Fayzulin (34 / 4), (Portugal) Danny (27 / 9), (Hungary) Szabolcs Huszti (26 / 4), Roman Shirokov (26 / 9), Aleksei Ionov (20 / 3), Sergei Semak (20 / 5), Vladimir Bystrov (12 / 1), Andrei Arshavin (10 / 3), (Italy) Alessandro Rosina (10), Sergei Petrov (2).
Forwards: Aleksandr Kerzhakov (32 / 23), (Serbia) Danko Lazović (31 / 12), Aleksandr Bukharov (31 / 6), Maksim Kanunnikov (10).
Manager: (Italy) Luciano Spalletti.

Transferred out during the season: (Portugal) Fernando Meira (to (Spain) Zaragoza), Igor Cheminava (on loan to Sibir Novosibirsk), Aleksei Ionov (to Kuban Krasnodar), Sergei Petrov (to Krylia Sovetov Samara).

2. FC Spartak Moscow

Goalkeepers: (Ukraine) Andriy Dikan (32), Artyom Rebrov (8), Nikolai Zabolotny (6).
Defenders: Yevgeni Makeyev (35 / 1), (Czech Republic) Marek Suchý (32 / 3), (Argentina) Nicolás Pareja (24 / 1), (Spain) Sergio Rodríguez (23 / 1), Aleksandr Sheshukov (20), Sergei Parshivlyuk (19), Sergei Bryzgalov (18), Fyodor Kudryashov (11), (Argentina) Marcos Rojo (8).
Midfielders: Dmitri Kombarov (40 / 6), Kirill Kombarov (37), (Brazil) Rafael Carioca (35 / 1), (Republic of Ireland) Aiden McGeady (31 / 3), (Georgia (country)) Jano Ananidze (15 / 1), (Netherlands) Demy de Zeeuw (13 / 2), Emin Mahmudov (12), (Brazil) Ibson (10 / 1), Diniyar Bilyaletdinov (8 / 1), Aleksandr Zotov (7), Soslan Gatagov (4), Dmitri Kayumov (3 / 1), (Brazil) Alex (3), Artur Valikayev (3), (Croatia) Filip Ozobić (1), Andrey Tikhonov (1).
Forwards: Artyom Dzyuba (41 / 11), (Brazil) Ari (38 / 10), (Nigeria) Emmanuel Emenike (22 / 13), (Brazil) Welliton (21 / 7), Pavel Yakovlev (10 / 1), Aleksandr Kozlov (8 / 1), Vladimir Obukhov (3).
Manager: Valery Karpin.

Transferred out during the season: Fyodor Kudryashov (on loan to Krasnodar), Emin Mahmudov (on loan to Tom Tomsk), (Brazil) Ibson (to (Brazil) Santos), (Brazil) Alex (to (Brazil) Corinthians), Artur Valikayev (on loan to Amkar Perm), (Croatia) Filip Ozobić (on loan to (Croatia) Hajduk Split), Pavel Yakovlev (on loan to Krylia Sovetov Samara).

3. PFC CSKA Moscow

Goalkeepers: Igor Akinfeev (28), Sergei Chepchugov (9), Vladimir Gabulov (7), Sergei Revyakin (2).
Defenders: Aleksei Berezutskiy (40), Sergei Ignashevich (38 / 5), Vasili Berezutskiy (36), Kirill Nababkin (34), (Lithuania) Deividas Šemberas (29), Georgi Schennikov (21), Viktor Vasin (4), (Nigeria) Chidi Odiah (3), Semyon Fedotov (2).
Midfielders: (Serbia) Zoran Tošić (36 / 8), Pavel Mamayev (33 / 1), Evgeni Aldonin (32), Alan Dzagoev (31 / 5), (Japan) Keisuke Honda (25 / 8), (Latvia) Aleksandrs Cauņa (18), (Bosnia and Herzegovina) Elvir Rahimić (12), (Sweden) Pontus Wernbloom (11), (Chile) Mark González (5 / 2), (South Korea) Kim In-Sung (1), Artyom Popov (1).
Forwards: (Ivory Coast) Seydou Doumbia (42 / 28), (Liberia) Sekou Oliseh (38), (Brazil) Vágner Love (25 / 9), (Czech Republic) Tomáš Necid (23 / 3), (Nigeria) Ahmed Musa (11).
Manager: Leonid Slutskiy.

Transferred out during the season: Vladimir Gabulov (end of loan at Anzhi Makhachkala), (Brazil) Vágner Love (to (Brazil) Flamengo).

== Attendances ==
No.	Club	Average	Change	Highest
1	Kuban	20,786	137,3%	31,527
2	Spartak Moscow	20,547	-12,4%	58,572
3	Zenit	19,688	1,4%	21,500
4	Rubin	16,013	18,5%	24,750
5	Lokomotiv Moscow	14,610	9,4%	26,244
6	Krylia Sovetov	14,564	3,2%	23,702
7	Anji	14,452	30,6%	15,200
8	Terek	14,243	71,7%	30,000
9	PFC CSKA	13,683	58,2%	51,000
10	Dynamo Moscow	10,193	43,2%	18,636
11	Amkar	9,250	-14,4%	16,100
12	FC Krasnodar	8,855	39,6%	23,700
13	FC Tom	8,682	-27,4%	11,200
14	Rostov	8,400	-25,2%	15,840
15	FC Volga	7,905	82,1%	17,800
16	Spartak Nalchik	4,574	-51,5%	10,000
