= 1994 Russian First League =

Football season

Russian First League
- Season: 1994

The 1994 Russian First League was the 3rd edition of Russian First Division. It was the first season after conversion from 3 zones in the First League into one zone of 22 teams.

== Overview ==
Team	Head coach
FC Chernomorets Novorossiysk	Oleg Dolmatov
FC Rostselmash Rostov-on-Don	Enver Yulgushov
FC Baltika Kaliningrad	Anatoli Ivanov
FC Sokol Saratov	Aleksandr Koreshkov
FC Shinnik Yaroslavl	Igor Volchok
FC Neftekhimik Nizhnekamsk	Gennadi Sarychev
FC Zarya Leninsk-Kuznetsky	Sergei Vasyutin
FC Druzhba Maykop	Soferbi Yeshugov
FC Lokomotiv Chita	Aleksandr Kovalyov
FC Asmaral Moscow	Valentin Ivanov (until August); Vladimir Belousov (from August)
FC Uralan Elista	Viktor Lidzhiyev
FC Luch Vladivostok	Igor Sayenko
FC Zenit St. Petersburg	Vyacheslav Melnikov
FC Zvezda Irkutsk	Sergei Muratov
FC Okean Nakhodka	Ishtvan Sekech
FC Irtysh Omsk	Artyom Amirdzhanov
FC Smena-Saturn St. Petersburg	Oleg Tereshonkov
FC Avtodor Vladikavkaz	Igor Tsakoyev
FC Torpedo Vladimir	Yuri Pyanov
FC Erzu Grozny	Vait Talgayev
FC Zvezda Perm	Viktor Slesarev
FC Tekhinvest-M Moskovsky	Aleksandr Novikov

== Standings ==
Pos	Team	Pld	W	D	L	GF	GA	GD	Pts	Promotion or relegation
1	Chernomorets Novorossiysk (P)	42	29	7	6	103	31	+72	65	Promotion to Top League
2	Rostselmash (P)	42	27	8	7	92	44	+48	62	Promotion to Top League
3	Baltika Kaliningrad	42	26	10	6	89	41	+48	62	
4	Sokol Saratov	42	21	11	10	65	48	+17	53	
5	Shinnik Yaroslavl	42	21	8	13	69	44	+25	50	
6	Neftekhimik Nizhnekamsk	42	18	11	13	56	40	+16	47	
7	Zarya Leninsk-Kuznetsky	42	20	4	18	80	64	+16	44	
8	Druzhba Maykop	42	18	8	16	51	57	−6	44	
9	Lokomotiv Chita	42	17	10	15	59	56	+3	44	
10	Asmaral Moscow	42	17	8	17	57	55	+2	42	
11	Uralan Elista	42	16	9	17	69	67	+2	41	
12	Luch Vladivostok	42	15	11	16	44	53	−9	41	
13	Zenit St. Petersburg	42	14	12	16	44	49	−5	40	
14	Zvezda Irkutsk (Note: FC Zvezda-Yunis-Sib Irkutsk renamed to FC Zvezda Irkutsk)	42	15	9	18	57	64	−7	39	
15	Okean Nakhodka	42	16	6	20	58	60	−2	38	
16	Irtysh Omsk	42	15	7	20	50	79	−29	37	
17	Smena-Saturn St. Petersburg	42	16	4	22	47	66	−19	36	
18	Avtodor Vladikavkaz (Note: FC Avtodor-Olaf Vladikavkaz renamed to FC Avtodor Vladikavkaz FC Avtodor Vladikavkaz were awarded 2 home wins when opponents did not arrive for the game.) (R)	42	13	6	23	48	67	−19	32	Relegation to Second League
19	Torpedo Vladimir (R)	42	13	5	24	52	81	−29	31	Relegation to Second League
20	Erzu Grozny (Note: FC Erzu Grozny was excluded from the league after playing 19 games (4 more games scheduled to be played in Grozny before Erzu's exclusion were awarded to Erzu with a score of 3:0 because the opponents did not arrive to the game due to security concerns on the brink of First Chechen War). Erzu did not play professionally in 1995.) (R)	42	11	8	23	33	73	−40	30	Relegation to Second League
21	Zvezda Perm (R)	42	11	5	26	46	81	−35	27	Relegation to Second League
22	Tekhinvest-M Moskovsky (Note: FC Interros Moscow renamed to FC Tekhinvest-M and moved to Moskovsky) (R)	42	4	11	27	55	104	−49	19	Relegation to Third League

Source: RSSSF
(P) Promoted; (R) Relegated

== Results ==
Home \ Away	ASM	AVT	BAL	CHE	DRU	ERZ	IRT	LCH	LUC	NEF	OKE	ROS	SHI	SME	SOK	TMM	TVL	URE	ZAR	ZEN	ZZI	ZZP
Asmaral Moscow		2–1	2–3	0–2	4–0	3–0	1–2	2–1	1–1	0–0	0–0	1–2	0–1	3–0	1–3	4–2	2–1	2–1	3–4	0–0	3–0	2–0
Avtodor Vladikavkaz	0–2		0–1	0–1	2–1	3–0	1–0	1–1	2–1	2–0	1–1	0–3	2–1	2–1	3–0	1–1	3–0	5–2	3–0	0–1	3–0	1–1
Baltika Kaliningrad	5–0	2–0		1–1	6–1	1–1	4–0	5–0	1–0	1–0	5–0	1–1	2–1	3–2	2–2	4–0	5–0	2–0	2–1	3–1	1–0	4–2
Chernomorets Novorossiysk	1–3	4–1	3–3		0–1	3–0	6–0	4–0	5–0	2–1	3–0	3–1	3–0	8–1	2–0	3–2	5–0	3–1	4–0	6–0	2–0	4–1
Druzhba Maykop	1–0	2–1	2–1	1–1		3–0	0–1	2–0	0–0	2–1	1–0	2–2	0–0	2–1	1–3	1–1	2–0	1–0	1–2	3–1	2–1	2–0
Erzu Grozny	3–0	0–0	0–3	2–1	2–0		0–3	1–1	2–0	3–1	3–0	0–3	0–3	3–0	0–3	0–3	0–3	0–3	0–3	0–3	3–0	3–0
Irtysh Omsk	1–0	3–2	0–4	0–4	1–0	0–2		0–1	1–1	3–2	3–0	0–4	4–0	3–1	0–3	4–1	2–1	2–2	3–1	0–0	2–2	4–1
Lokomotiv Chita	4–0	1–0	1–1	1–1	0–1	2–0	0–0		0–0	3–2	4–0	1–1	0–0	1–0	3–1	3–2	5–2	2–0	2–1	4–1	3–0	1–0
Luch Vladivostok	0–2	0–1	2–0	0–1	1–1	3–0	2–0	1–0		0–0	2–0	3–0	2–1	4–1	3–1	1–1	3–1	3–0	1–1	0–0	0–0	2–1
Neftekhimik Nizhnekamsk	2–1	3–0	0–0	1–0	2–0	3–0	1–0	3–0	1–0		3–0	1–2	1–0	1–0	0–0	3–1	1–0	4–2	2–0	0–0	4–1	1–1
Okean Nakhodka	2–0	2–0	0–1	1–1	2–2	3–0	4–0	1–1	2–0	3–1		0–3	4–1	4–1	3–0	3–0	2–0	4–0	3–0	3–1	3–1	4–0
Rostselmash	1–0	4–2	6–0	3–1	6–2	1–1	3–0	3–0	4–0	1–0	2–0		1–0	2–1	3–1	5–2	1–0	4–1	3–0	0–0	3–2	1–0
Shinnik Yaroslavl	2–2	7–3	1–1	1–2	2–1	2–0	3–0	1–1	1–0	0–1	4–0	2–0		3–0	3–1	0–0	2–0	3–0	1–0	3–1	4–1	4–0
Smena-Saturn St. Petersburg	0–0	1–0	2–0	0–1	1–0	3–0	4–0	2–1	3–0	1–1	2–0	1–0	1–0		0–0	1–1	0–1	0–1	3–2	2–1	1–0	3–0
Sokol Saratov	0–0	0–0	1–1	1–1	0–2	0–0	1–0	2–1	4–0	3–2	1–0	1–0	4–2	2–0		2–1	4–1	4–2	1–0	2–1	3–0	3–1
Tekhinvest-M Moskovsky	1–3	5–0	1–3	1–2	1–2	1–2	1–2	2–5	2–3	1–1	1–0	2–2	2–2	1–2	2–2		2–4	2–2	0–3	2–2	1–0	1–2
Torpedo Vladimir	3–4	2–1	1–1	0–4	2–1	1–0	2–1	3–1	1–1	1–0	2–1	2–3	0–1	2–0	0–0	6–1		1–1	1–3	0–2	1–1	5–1
Uralan Elista	3–0	2–1	2–0	0–1	4–1	0–0	2–2	3–1	5–0	0–0	2–0	4–4	1–2	3–0	1–0	3–1	3–1		1–2	2–1	1–1	2–0
Zarya Leninsk-Kuznetsky	0–2	4–0	4–1	0–1	2–4	1–1	3–0	0–2	4–1	1–1	4–1	2–0	1–2	4–2	3–0	7–1	6–1	2–2		3–2	4–2	1–0
Zenit St. Petersburg	1–0	1–0	0–1	2–1	0–0	1–1	0–0	3–0	1–0	0–0	1–0	1–2	0–2	1–0	1–2	5–1	3–0	1–0	0–1		1–1	0–2
Zvezda Irkutsk	0–0	2–0	0–1	0–0	1–0	3–0	8–3	1–0	0–1	3–2	2–1	2–2	1–0	4–1	2–2	2–0	1–0	2–1	1–0	1–2		3–2
Zvezda Perm	1–2	2–0	0–3	1–2	2–0	3–0	1–0	3–1	1–2	2–3	1–1	2–0	1–1	1–2	0–2	2–1	1–0	2–4	3–0	1–1	1–5	

Legend: Blue = home team win; Yellow = draw; Red = away team win.

== Top goalscorers ==
Rank	Player	Team	Goals
1	(Russia) Dmitri Silin	Baltika	35
2	(Russia) Aleksandr Maslov	Rostselmash	32
3	(Russia) Sergei Burdin	Chernomorets	30
4	(Russia) Dmitri Vyazmikin	Torpedo (Vld)	24
5	(Russia) Sergei Toporov	Zarya	21
5	(Kazakhstan) Valeriy Yablochkin	Shinnik	21
7	(Russia) Khazret Dyshekov	Chernomorets	19
8	(Russia) Lev Matveyev	Zvezda (P)	17
9	(Russia) Leonid Markevich	Sokol	16
9	(Russia) Yevgeni Yastrebinskiy	Uralan	16

== See also ==
- 1994 Russian Top League
- 1994 Russian Second League
- 1994 Russian Third League
