= 2000 Russian First Division =

Russian First Division
- Season: 2000

The 2000 Russian First Division was the ninth edition of the Russian First Division.

== Overview ==
Team	Head coach
FC Sokol Saratov	Alexander Koreshkov
FC Torpedo-ZIL Moscow	Boris Ignatyev
FC Rubin Kazan	Viktor Antikhovich
FC Shinnik Yaroslavl	Aleksei Petrushin (until June); Aleksandr Pobegalov (from June)
FC Kristall Smolensk	Lev Platonov, (Turkmenistan) Kurban Berdyev
FC Amkar Perm	Sergei Oborin
FC Gazovik-Gazprom Izhevsk	Aleksandr Ivchenko
FC Lokomotiv Chita	Aleksandr Kovalyov
FC Lada Togliatti	Aleksandr Garmashov
FC Tom Tomsk	Vladimir Puzanov
FC Arsenal Tula	Valeri Tretyakov
FC Baltika Kaliningrad	Viktor Karman
FC Volgar-Gazprom Astrakhan	Korney Shperling
FC Metallurg Krasnoyarsk	Ishtvan Sekech (until May); Vladimir Kukhlevsky (May to July); Aleksandr Irkhin (from July)
PFC Spartak Nalchik	Aslanbek Khantsev (until September); Sergei Ponomaryov (from September)
FC Nosta Novotroitsk	Valeri Znarok (until July); Sergei Butenko (from July)
FC Zhemchuzhina Sochi	Arsen Naydyonov
FC Metallurg Lipetsk	Sergei Savchenkov (until June); Gennadi Soshenko (June to July); Vladimir Dergach (July to October); Gennadi Soshenko (from October)
FC Spartak-Chukotka Moscow	Anatoli Shelest, Anatoliy Korobochka
FC Lokomotiv St. Petersburg	(Georgia (country)) Givi Nodia

== Standings ==
Pos	Team	Pld	W	D	L	GF	GA	GD	Pts	Promotion or relegation
1	Sokol Saratov (P)	38	28	5	5	75	27	+48	89	Promotion to Top Division
2	Torpedo-ZIL Moscow (P)	38	24	8	6	59	28	+31	80	Promotion to Top Division
3	Rubin Kazan	38	24	6	8	58	28	+30	78	
4	Shinnik Yaroslavl	38	20	11	7	55	33	+22	71	
5	Kristall Smolensk	38	19	4	15	60	49	+11	61	
6	Amkar Perm	38	17	9	12	50	38	+12	60	
7	Gazovik-Gazprom Izhevsk	38	18	5	15	52	52	0	59	
8	Lokomotiv Chita	38	16	5	17	47	51	−4	53	
9	Lada-Togliatti	38	14	10	14	55	49	+6	52	
10	Tom Tomsk	38	14	10	14	33	28	+5	52	
11	Arsenal Tula	38	13	13	12	42	39	+3	52	
12	Baltika Kaliningrad	38	15	6	17	37	46	−9	51	
13	Volgar-Gazprom Astrakhan	38	13	12	13	43	39	+4	51	
14	Metallurg Krasnoyarsk	38	15	5	18	37	49	−12	50	
15	Spartak Nalchik	38	13	9	16	34	44	−10	48	
16	Nosta Novotroitsk (R)	38	12	10	16	41	51	−10	46	Relegation to Second Division
17	Zhemchuzhina Sochi (R)	38	12	7	19	45	70	−25	43	Relegation to Second Division
18	Metallurg Lipetsk (R)	38	10	9	19	40	53	−13	39	Relegation to Second Division
19	Spartak-Chukotka Moscow (Note: FC Spartak-Chukotka Moscow were excluded from the division after playing 19 games and gaining 16 points due to lack of financing. All the remaining opponents were awarded a 3-0 win. They did not participate in any national-level competitions in 2001.) (R)	38	4	4	30	29	58	−29	16	Relegation to Second Division
20	Lokomotiv St. Petersburg (Note: FC Lokomotiv St. Petersburg lost professional status and played in the Russian Amateur Football League in 2001.) (R)	38	3	4	31	27	87	−60	13	Relegation to Second Division

Source: PFL, RSSSF
(P) Promoted; (R) Relegated

== Results ==
Home \ Away	AMK	ARS	BAL	GGI	KRI	LAD	LCH	LSP	MKR	MTL	NOS	RUB	SHI	SOK	SCM	SPN	TOM	TZM	VOL	ZHE
Amkar Perm		1–0	0–0	4–2	0–2	0–0	1–1	3–0	5–1	3–1	3–1	2–0	1–1	0–1	3–0	2–1	2–1	1–1	1–0	1–1
Arsenal Tula	3–1		3–0	0–1	1–1	2–2	2–0	2–0	0–0	2–1	0–2	2–1	1–1	0–0	3–0	0–2	1–0	0–0	1–0	4–2
Baltika Kaliningrad	1–0	2–1		1–2	4–3	2–1	1–0	1–3	1–2	2–1	1–0	2–1	1–2	1–0	1–1	2–2	1–0	0–1	2–1	1–2
Gazovik-Gazprom	2–1	1–0	2–0		3–1	2–1	3–1	2–1	4–1	0–1	0–0	2–1	0–2	0–1	3–0	4–1	1–2	1–1	1–1	3–1
Kristall Smolensk	1–2	2–1	3–1	2–0		2–1	1–0	3–1	1–1	2–1	3–0	3–0	0–1	1–3	3–0	2–0	2–1	2–3	0–0	1–1
Lada-Togliatti	1–1	2–2	1–0	1–3	1–0		3–0	3–1	1–2	3–1	2–1	0–0	2–1	3–4	3–3	3–1	2–0	0–1	1–1	4–0
Lokomotiv Chita	1–2	0–0	1–0	1–3	2–0	2–1		2–0	1–0	1–0	4–3	1–2	0–0	2–1	7–0	4–1	1–0	1–0	1–0	1–0
Lokomotiv St. Petersburg	0–4	0–2	1–2	1–2	1–3	1–1	0–2		0–1	2–2	1–2	0–2	2–2	0–2	3–1	0–3	0–0	1–4	0–1	2–3
Metallurg Krasnoyarsk	0–1	1–0	0–2	3–0	0–2	0–2	3–1	2–0		0–1	0–0	0–0	2–1	2–0	3–1	1–0	1–0	0–1	1–0	4–1
Metallurg Lipetsk	1–1	0–2	2–1	1–0	0–3	0–1	4–2	6–1	2–2		0–1	0–0	3–2	0–0	3–0	0–0	1–0	0–2	2–0	1–1
Nosta Novotroitsk	1–0	1–1	1–1	0–1	2–1	0–2	4–2	3–0	2–0	1–1		0–0	2–1	1–3	6–1	2–2	0–0	1–3	1–1	2–2
Rubin Kazan	0–1	2–1	4–0	1–0	3–0	1–0	1–0	5–0	2–1	2–0	1–0		3–1	2–0	3–1	2–0	2–1	2–0	3–1	3–1
Shinnik Yaroslavl	1–0	1–1	1–0	3–1	2–0	3–1	1–1	1–0	3–1	1–0	5–0	2–0		0–0	3–0	3–2	1–1	1–0	0–0	2–1
Sokol Saratov	3–1	3–0	1–0	5–0	6–2	2–1	2–1	2–1	3–0	5–2	2–0	1–2	2–0		3–0	3–0	3–0	2–0	1–0	3–1
Spartak-Chukotka Moscow	3–2	2–2	0–3	2–4	1–3	0–3	0–3	0–3	0–3	3–2	0–3	0–3	1–3	1–4		1–0	0–3	0–3	3–7	3–1
Spartak Nalchik	2–1	1–1	0–0	1–0	0–1	2–0	0–0	2–0	1–0	1–0	0–1	3–2	0–1	0–0	3–0		1–0	3–0	0–2	1–0
Tom Tomsk	1–0	0–0	2–0	1–1	1–0	3–2	2–0	3–0	1–0	1–0	1–0	0–0	2–0	1–2	3–0	0–0		0–0	1–1	3–0
Torpedo-ZIL Moscow	3–1	4–1	2–0	2–1	1–0	2–0	4–1	2–1	4–1	2–1	2–0	1–1	0–0	2–2	1–1	1–0	1–0		1–0	3–0
Volgar-Gazprom	0–0	1–0	0–0	0–0	4–3	1–1	3–0	1–0	3–1	2–1	3–0	1–3	2–2	0–1	3–0	1–1	1–0	1–3		2–1
Zhemchuzhina Sochi	0–1	1–3	1–0	3–2	0–4	2–2	3–2	4–3	2–0	1–1	1–0	0–1	0–3	0–2	3–0	4–0	1–1	1–0	2–1	

Source: PFL (in Russian)
Legend: Blue = home team win; Yellow = draw; Red = away team win.

== Top goalscorers ==
Rank	Player	Team	Goals
1	(Russia) Andrei Fedkov	Sokol	26
2	(Russia) Nail Galimov	Lokomotiv (Ch)	19
3	(Russia) Konstantin Paramonov	Amkar	17
4	(Russia) Valeri Solyanik	Kristall	15
5	(Russia) Leonid Markevich	Sokol	13
6	(Russia) Vladimir Filippov	Rubin	12
6	(Russia) Mikhail Nikitin	Sokol	12
8	(Russia) Nikolai Kurilov	Gazovik-Gazprom	11
9	(Georgia (country)) Gocha Gogrichiani	Zhemchuzhina	10
9	(Latvia) Aleksandrs Jeļisejevs	Arsenal	10
9	(Russia) Aleksandr Katasonov	Spartak-Chukotka	10
9	(Russia) Aleksandr Krotov	Volgar-Gazprom	10
9	(Russia) Vladimir Lebed	Torpedo-ZIL	10
9	(Russia) Aleksandr Studzinsky	Kristall	10
9	(Azerbaijan) Nazim Suleymanov	Zhemchuzhina	10

== See also ==
- 2000 Russian Top Division
- 2000 Russian Second Division
