= Timur Kuriyev =

Russian footballer and coach

Personal information
- Full name: Timur Eriskhanovich Kuriyev
- Date of birth: 1 January 1957
- Place of birth: Kyrgyz SSR
- Date of death: 14 October 2003 (aged 46)
- Place of death: Malgobeksky District, Russia
- Height: 1.80 m (5 ft 11 in)
- Positions: Defender; midfielder

Senior career*
Years	Team	Apps	(Gls)
1975–1982	FC Terek Grozny	126	(5)
1983	FC Turbina Brezhnev	24	(0)
1984	FC Terek Grozny	27	(0)
1986–1987	FC Terek Grozny	39	(0)
1990	FC KAMAZ Naberezhnye Chelny	16	(0)
1990	FC Terek Grozny	7	(0)

Managerial career
- 1992: FC Erzu Grozny
- 1993: FC Erzu Grozny (assistant)
- 1993–1999: FC Angusht Nazran
- 2002: FC Terek Grozny (caretaker)
- 2003: FC Angusht Nazran
- * Club domestic league appearances and goals

Timur Eriskhanovich Kuriyev (Russian: Тимур Эрисханович Куриев; born 1 January 1957; died 14 October 2003 in an automobile accident) was a Russian professional football player and later coach.
