= Yuri Nagaytsev =

Latvian footballer (born 1973)

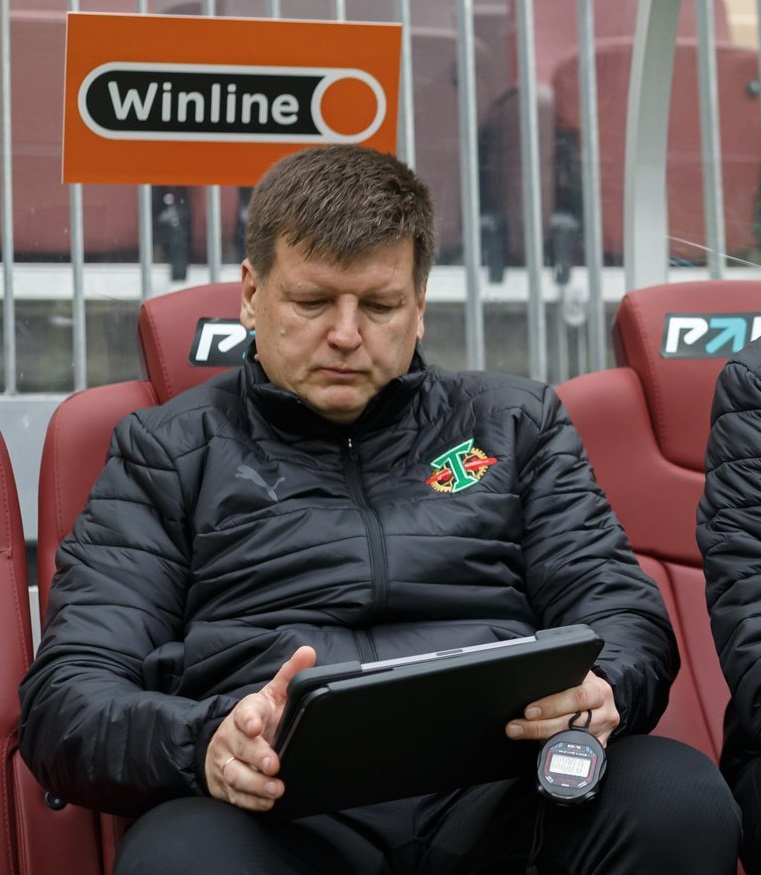
- Nagaytsev with Torpedo Moscow in 2022

Personal information
- Full name: Yuri Anatolyevich Nagaytsev
- Date of birth: 19 April 1973 (age 53)
- Place of birth: Riga, Latvian SSR, USSR
- Position: Midfielder

Team information
- Current team: FC Baltika Kaliningrad (assistant coach)

Youth career
- FC Daugava Riga
- FK RFS

Senior career*
Years	Team	Apps	(Gls)
1991	RAF-2		
1992	FC Gemma		
1993	FK Auda		
1994–1995	FK Kvadrāts	13	(0)

Managerial career
- 1993–1996: DYuSFSSh OR Daugava
- 1996–2007: Skonto FC (assistant)
- 2017–2018: FC Tambov (physical training coach)
- 2018–2019: FC Pyunik (senior coach)
- 2019–2020: FC Khimki (coach-analyst)
- 2020: PFC Krylia Sovetov Samara (senior coach)
- 2020–2022: FC Akhmat Grozny (senior coach)
- 2022: FC Akhmat Grozny (caretaker)
- 2022–2023: FC Torpedo Moscow (senior coach)
- 2023–2024: FC Khimki (senior coach)
- 2024–: FC Baltika Kaliningrad (senior coach)
- * Club domestic league appearances and goals

Yuri Anatolyevich Nagaytsev (Russian: Юрий Анатольевич Нагайцев, Latvian: Jurijs Nagaicevs; born 19 April 1973) is a Latvian football coach and a former player of Russian descent. He is an assistant coach with FC Baltika Kaliningrad.

== Coaching career ==
On 11 September 2022, Nagaytsev was appointed caretaker manager of the Russian Premier League club FC Akhmat Grozny, following dismissal of Andrei Talalayev. Nagaytsev worked as Talalayev's assistant at his last five clubs at that point, including Akhmat. Sergei Tashuyev was appointed as permanent manager on 22 September 2022. Nagaytsev continued working with Talalayev after that.
