= Ramzan Tsutsulayev =

Russian footballer and coach

Personal information
- Full name: Ramzan Iznaurovich Tsutsulayev
- Date of birth: 27 May 1972 (age 54)
- Place of birth: Grozny, Russian SFSR, Soviet Union
- Height: 1.80 m (5 ft 11 in)
- Position: Goalkeeper

Team information
- Current team: FC Akhmat Grozny (asst manager)

Senior career*
Years	Team	Apps	(Gls)
1990–1991	FC Terek Grozny	7	(0)
1992–1994	FC Erzu Grozny	49	(0)
1995	FC KAMAZ Naberezhnye Chelny	0	(0)
1995	FC Kristall Smolensk	29	(0)
1997	FC Kristall Smolensk	16	(0)
1998	FC Anzhi Makhachkala	1	(0)
1998–2000	FC Angusht Nazran	63	(0)
2001–2004	FC Terek Grozny	54	(0)

Managerial career
- 2005–2006: FC Terek Grozny (assistant)
- 2008–: FC Akhmat Grozny (assistant)
- * Club domestic league appearances and goals

Ramzan Iznaurovich Tsutsulayev (Russian: Рамзан Изнаурович Цуцулаев; born 27 May 1972) is a Russian professional football coach and a former player. He works as an assistant coach with FC Akhmat Grozny.

== Playing career ==
He made his professional debut in the Soviet Second League in 1990 for FC Terek Grozny.

He made his Russian Football National League debut for FC Erzu Grozny on 22 April 1993 in a game against FC Spartak Anapa.

== Honours ==
- Russian Cup winner: 2004.
