= Koreshkov =

Koreshkov (Russian: Корешков) is a Russian masculine surname, its feminine counterpart is Koreshkova. It may refer to

- Alexander Koreshkov (disambiguation)
- Andrey Koreshkov (born 1990), Russian mixed martial artist
- Yevgeni Koreshkov (born 1970), Kazakhstani ice hockey player
