= Ruslan İdiqov =

Azerbaijani footballer (born 1966)

Personal information
- Date of birth: 29 March 1966 (age 60)
- Place of birth: Grozny, Russian SFSR
- Height: 1.83 m (6 ft 0 in)
- Positions: Midfielder; defender

Senior career*
Years	Team	Apps	(Gls)
1984–1989	FC Terek Grozny	102	(11)
1989	FC Spartak Ordzhonikidze	22	(2)
1990–1991	FC Terek Grozny	62	(12)
1992–1994	FC Erzu Grozny	69	(27)
1995	FC KAMAZ-Chally Naberezhnye Chelny	2	(0)
1995–1997	PFC Spartak Nalchik	96	(26)
1998–2000	FC Angusht Nazran	86	(23)
2001–2003	FC Terek Grozny	101	(33)

International career
1996	Azerbaijan	6	(1)

Managerial career
- 2004: FC Terek Grozny (technical director)
- 2005: FC Terek Grozny (reserves)
- 2007: FC Terek Grozny (assistant)
- 2008: FC Terek Grozny (reserves)
- 2010: FC Angusht Nazran
- 2013–2015: FC Terek-2 Grozny (assistant)
- 2015–2020: FC Akhmat Grozny (U21)
- 2018: FC Akhmat Grozny (caretaker)
- * Club domestic league appearances and goals

Ruslan İdiqov (Russian: Руслан Хазирович Идигов; born 29 March 1966) is an Azerbaijani professional football coach and a former player of Chechen descent. He also holds Russian citizenship.

== Playing career ==
He made his professional debut in the Soviet Second League in 1984 for FC Terek Grozny.

== Coaching career ==
He was appointed caretaker manager of FC Akhmat Grozny in the Russian Premier League on 2 September 2018 following the resignation of Igor Lediakhov.

== International goals ==
#	Date	Venue	Opponent	Score	Result	Competition
1.	27 May 1996	Maladzyechna, Belarus	Belarus	2-2	2-2	Friendly

== Honours ==
Terek Grozny

- Russian Cup: 2004
