= Vait Talgayev =

Kazakhstani footballer (born 1953)

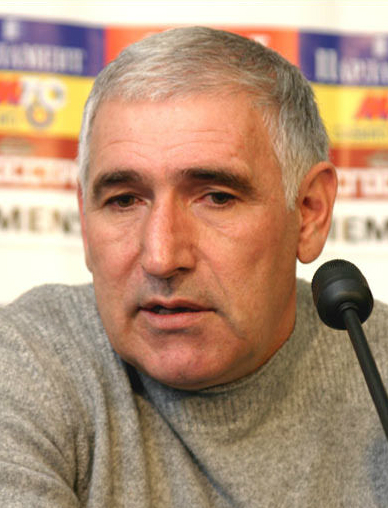
- Talgaev in 2005

Personal information
- Full name: Vait Abdul-Khamidovich Talgayev
- Date of birth: 11 May 1953 (age 73)
- Place of birth: Dzhambul, Kazakh SSR
- Height: 1.79 m (5 ft 10 in)
- Position: Defender

Senior career*
Years	Team	Apps	(Gls)
1972–1975	Alatau Dzhambul	127	(1)
1976–1979	Kairat	125	(0)
1981–1982	Kairat	29	(0)
1982–1986	Khimik Dzhambul	120	(10)

Managerial career
- 1990–1991: Khimik Dzhambul
- 1992: Fosfor Dzhambul
- 1993–1994: Erzu Grozny
- 1996–1997: Taraz
- 1998: Irtysh Pavlodar
- 1998–1999: Kaisar-Hurricane
- 1999: Sintez
- 2000: Kazakhstan
- 2000–2002: Atyrau
- 2003–2005: Terek Grozny
- 2006–2007: Terek Grozny
- 2009–2010: Zhetysu
- 2010–2011: Taraz
- 2012–2015: Terek Grozny (assistant)
- 2013: Terek Grozny (caretaker)
- 2017–2018: Taraz
- 2020: Taraz (assistant)
- * Club domestic league appearances and goals

Vait Abdul-Khamidovich Talgayev (first name also spelled Voit; Russian: Ваит Абдул-Хамидович Талгаев; born 11 May 1953) is a Kazakhstani football coach and former player.

== Honours ==
=== As a player ===
FC Kairat

- Soviet First League: 1976

=== As a manager ===
FC Taraz

- Kazakhstan Premier League: 1996

Terek Grozny

- Russian Cup: 2003–04
- Russian First Division: 2004
