= Murat Yemkuzhev =

Russian footballer

Personal information
- Full name: Murat Mukhamedovich Yemkuzhev
- Date of birth: 1 April 1984 (age 42)
- Height: 1.88 m (6 ft 2 in)
- Position: Defender

Team information
- Current team: PFC Spartak Nalchik (manager)

Senior career*
Years	Team	Apps	(Gls)
2002–2004	PFC Spartak-2 Nalchik		
2005	FC Spartak-UGP Anapa	9	(0)
2006	PFC Spartak Nalchik	0	(0)
2007–2008	FC Sheksna Cherepovets	57	(2)
2009	FC Chernomorets Novorossiysk	28	(0)
2010	FC Rusichi Oryol	16	(0)
2011	FC Kavkaztransgaz-2005 Ryzdvyany	24	(0)
2012–2013	FC Druzhba Maykop	31	(3)
2013–2014	FC Vityaz Krymsk	25	(1)

Managerial career
- 2025: PFC Spartak Nalchik (assistant)
- 2025–: PFC Spartak Nalchik
- * Club domestic league appearances and goals

Murat Mukhamedovich Yemkuzhev (Russian: Мурат Мухамедович Емкужев; born 1 April 1984) is a Russian professional football coach and a former player. He is the manager of PFC Spartak Nalchik.

== Club career ==
He made his debut for PFC Spartak Nalchik on 20 September 2006 in a Russian Cup game against FC Sibir Novosibirsk.

He played in the Russian Football National League for FC Chernomorets Novorossiysk in 2009.
