= Alexander Koreshkov =

Alexander Koreshkov may refer to:

- Alexander Koreshkov (footballer) (born 1952), Russian football manager and a former player
- Alexander Koreshkov (ice hockey) (born 1968), Kazakhstani former ice hockey player
