= Alexander Zarutsky =

Russian footballer

Personal information
- Full name: Alexander Stanislavovich Zarutsky
- Date of birth: 24 January 1969 (age 57)
- Place of birth: Nalchik, Russian SFSR
- Height: 1.92 m (6 ft 3 1/2 in)
- Positions: Defender; midfielder

Senior career*
Years	Team	Apps	(Gls)
1990–1992	FC More Feodosia		
1992	FC Avtozapchast Baksan	36	(17)
1993	FC Avtodor Vladikavkaz	31	(3)
1994–1998	PFC Spartak Nalchik	169	(40)
1998	FC Alania Vladikavkaz	1	(0)
1999	PFC Spartak Nalchik	0	(0)
2000	FC Zhenis	28	(3)
2001–2002	PFC Spartak Nalchik	63	(8)
2003	FC Yelimay Semipalatinsk	21	(0)
2004	FC Tavriya Simferopol	27	(1)
2005–2006	PFC Spartak Nalchik	43	(4)
Total		419+	(76+)

Managerial career
- 2006–2013: PFC Spartak Nalchik (director of sports)
- * Club domestic league appearances and goals

Alexander Stanislavovich Zarutsky (Russian: Алекса́ндр Станисла́вович Зару́цкий; born 24 January 1969) is a Russian professional association football official and a former player.

== Honours ==
- Kazakhstan Premier League champion: 2000.
