= Timur Shipshev =

Russian footballer and manager

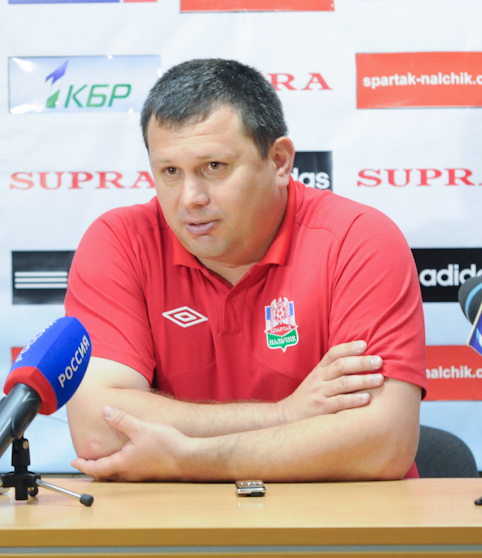
- Timur Shipshev

Personal information
- Full name: Timur Karalbiyevich Shipshev
- Date of birth: 31 August 1970 (age 56)
- Place of birth: Nartkala, Russian SFSR
- Height: 1.74 m (5 ft 9 in)
- Position: Defender

Senior career*
Years	Team	Apps	(Gls)
1990	Remontnik Prokhladny	23	(0)
1991	Etalon Baksan	39	(1)
1992–1993	Spartak Nalchik	62	(3)
1995	Avtozapchast Baksan	19	(1)
1995–2001	Spartak Nalchik	132	(0)
Total		275	(5)

Managerial career
- 2006–2012: Spartak Nalchik (assistant)
- 2012–2013: Spartak Nalchik (caretaker)
- 2018–2019: Tambov
- 2019–2021: Tambov (assistant)
- 2021: Kuban Krasnodar (assistant)
- 2023: Pari NN (assistant)
- * Club domestic league appearances and goals

Timur Karalbiyevich Shipshev (Russian: Тимур Каральбиевич Шипшев; born 31 August 1970) is a Russian professional football manager and a former player.

== Manager career ==
He was appointed caretaker manager of Spartak Nalchik on 15 April 2012 when Sergei Tashuyev resigned as a manager. Spartak Nalchik was relegated from the Russian Premier League under Shipshev's management two weeks later.
