= Lev Platonov =

Russian footballer and coach

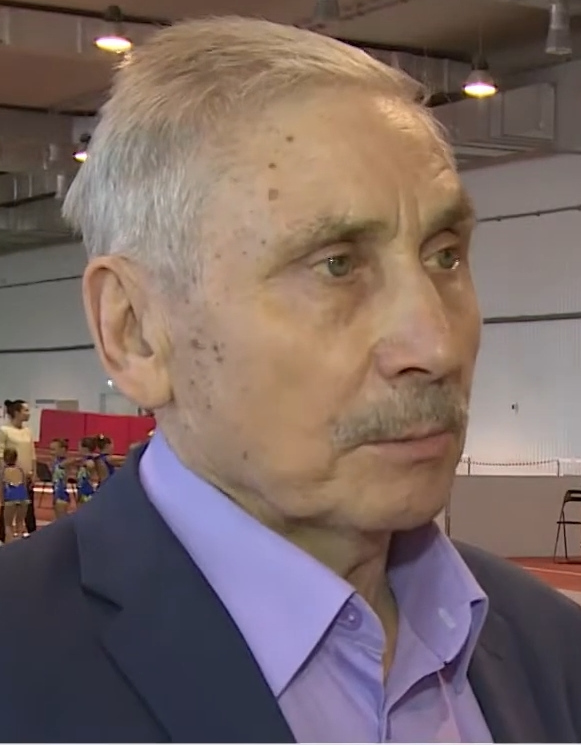
- Platonov in 2018

Personal information
- Full name: Lev Vasilyevich Platonov
- Date of birth: 10 May 1940 (age 86)
- Place of birth: Ryazan, Russian SFSR

Senior career*
Years	Team	Apps	(Gls)
1961	FC Spartak Ryazan		
1965	FC Iskra Smolensk		

Managerial career
- 1970–1975: FC Iskra Smolensk (director)
- 1975–1984: FC Iskra Smolensk
- 1985–1986: PFC CSKA Moscow (director)
- 1988–1989: FC Spartak Moscow (scout)
- 1991: FC Asmaral Moscow (assistant)
- 1992: FC Iskra Smolensk (president)
- 1994–1995: FC Kristall Smolensk (deputy general director)
- 1996: FC CSK VVS-Kristall Smolensk
- 1997: FC Dinamo Minsk (assistant)
- 1999–2000: FC Kristall Smolensk
- 2002: FC Terek Grozny
- * Club domestic league appearances and goals

Lev Vasilyevich Platonov (Russian: Лев Васильевич Платонов; born 10 May 1940) is a Russian professional football coach and a former player.

== Coaching career ==
The highest level he managed at was the second-tier 1999 Russian First Division and 2000 Russian First Division with FC Kristall Smolensk.

Later he managed FC Terek Grozny early in the 2002 season of the Russian Second Division. Terek was promoted to the Russian First Division at the end of the season, Platonov was replaced as a manager by that time.
