= Khasanbi Bidzhiyev =

Russian footballer and coach

Khasanbi Bidzhiyev Хасанби Биджиев
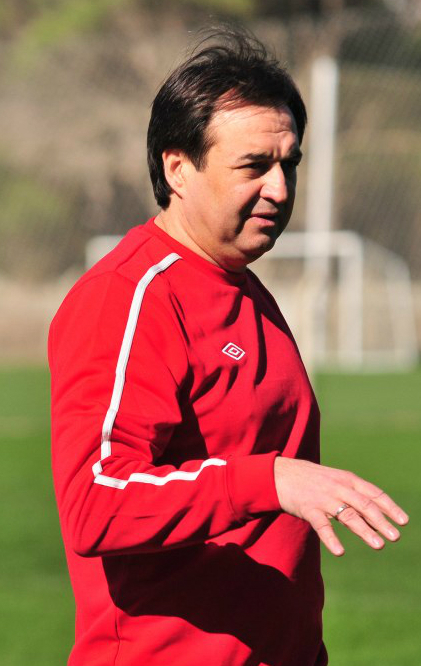
- Bidzhiyev in 2014

Personal information
- Full name: Khasanbi Eduardovich Bidzhiyev
- Date of birth: 19 May 1966 (age 60)
- Place of birth: Nalchik, Kabardino-Balkaria, Russia
- Height: 1.87 m (6 ft 2 in)
- Position: Goalkeeper

Team information
- Current team: Fakel Voronezh (manager)

Youth career
- ROShISP-10 Rostov-on-Don
- Spartak Nalchik

Senior career*
Years	Team	Apps	(Gls)
1983–1984	Spartak Nalchik	52	(0)
1985–1987	SKA Rostov-on-Don	88	(0)
1988	CSKA Moscow	15	(0)
1989–1992	Lokomotiv Moscow	32	(0)
1992	Lokomotiv-d Moscow	9	(0)
1992	Hapoel Petah Tikva	5	(0)
1993	Hapoel Tel Aviv	5	(0)
1993–1998	Lokomotiv Moscow	22	(0)
1994–1998	Lokomotiv-d Moscow	40	(0)

Managerial career
- 2001–2006: Lokomotiv Moscow (technical director)
- 2007–2008: Amkar Perm (sporting director)
- 2010–2011: Spartak Nalchik (assistant)
- 2011–2012: Amkar Perm (assistant)
- 2012–2013: Anzhi Makhachkala (sporting director)
- 2014–2017: Spartak Nalchik
- 2017–2018: Avangard Kursk
- 2021: Rotor Volgograd (assistant)
- 2021–2024: Spartak Nalchik
- 2024–2025: Dynamo Makhachkala
- 2026–: Fakel Voronezh
- * Club domestic league appearances and goals

Khasanbi Eduardovich Bidzhiyev (Russian: Хасанби Эдуардович Биджиев; born 19 May 1966) is a Russian professional football coach and a former player who is the manager of Fakel Voronezh.

== Playing career ==
He made his professional debut in the Soviet Second League in 1983 for Spartak Nalchik. He played 3 games in the UEFA Cup Winners' Cup 1997–98 for Lokomotiv Moscow.

== Coaching career ==
On 20 May 2024, Dynamo Makhachkala secured promotion to the Russian Premier League for the first time in its history under Bidzhiyev's management. He resigned from Dynamo on 7 December 2025.

On 1 November 2026, Bidhiyev was hired by Fakel Voronezh.

== Honours ==
- Russian Premier League runner-up: 1995.
- Russian Premier League bronze: 1994, 1998.
- Soviet Cup finalist: 1990.
- Russian Cup winner: 1997.
- Russian Professional Football League Zone South Best Manager: 2015–16.

== External sources ==
- Khasanbi Bidzhiyev at FootballFacts.ru (in Russian)
