= Isa Baytiyev =

Russian footballer, coach, and manager

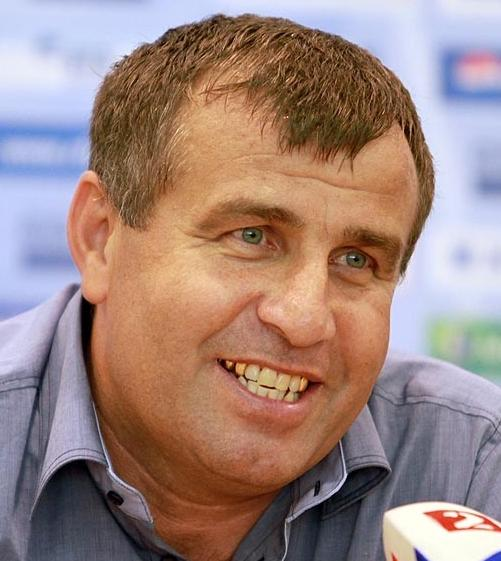

Personal information
- Full name: Isa Abduldzhalilovich Baytiyev
- Date of birth: 2 December 1966 (age 59)
- Height: 1.81 m (5 ft 11 1/2 in)
- Position: Defender

Team information
- Current team: FC Akhmat Grozny (U-19 manager)

Senior career*
Years	Team	Apps	(Gls)
1991	FC Vaynakh Shali	36	(1)
1992–1994	FC Terek Grozny	75	(0)
1995–2000	FC Angusht Nazran	199	(2)
2001	FC Terek Grozny	32	(0)

Managerial career
- 2002: FC Terek Grozny (press attache)
- 2003–2006: FC Terek Grozny (assistant)
- 2007: FC Terek Grozny (administrator)
- 2008–2011: FC Terek Grozny (assistant)
- 2011: FC Terek Grozny (caretaker)
- 2011: FC Terek Grozny
- 2011: FC Akhmat Grozny (assistant)
- 2013–2017: FC Akhmat Grozny (assistant)
- 2018–: FC Akhmat Grozny (U-19)
- 2023: FC Akhmat Grozny (caretaker)
- * Club domestic league appearances and goals

Isa Abduldzhalilovich Baytiyev (Russian: Иса Абдулжалилович Байтиев; born 2 December 1966) is a Russian professional football coach and a former player.

He is the manager of the Under-19 squad of FC Akhmat Grozny in the Russian Premier League.
