= Rashid Rakhimov =

Tajikistani footballer

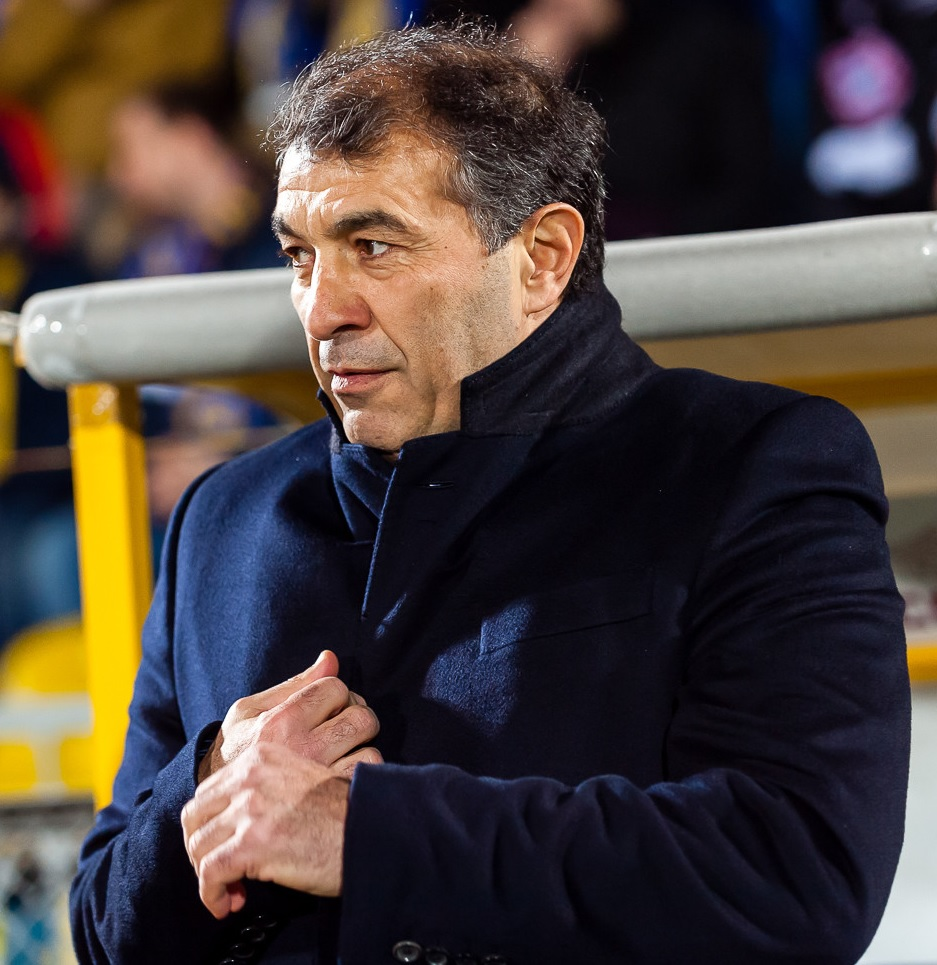
- Rakhimov coaching Terek in 2017

Personal information
- Full name: Rashid Mamatkulovich Rakhimov
- Date of birth: 18 March 1965 (age 61)
- Place of birth: Dushanbe, Tajik SSR, Soviet Union
- Height: 1.80 m (5 ft 11 in)
- Position: Midfielder

Youth career
- –1981: SKA-Pamir Dushanbe

Senior career*
Years	Team	Apps	(Gls)
1982–1991	SKA-Pamir Dushanbe	277	(24)
1992–1994	Spartak Moscow	26	(1)
1992–1993	→ Valladolid (loan)	29	(2)
1993–1994	→ Lokomotiv Moscow (loan)	14	(0)
1995–2000	Austria Wien	120	(12)
2000–2001	Admira Wacker	33	(0)
2001–2002	Ried	16	(0)
Total		515	(39)

International career
1992, 1996	Tajikistan	2	(0)
1994–1995	Russia	4	(0)

Managerial career
- 2002–2004: Admira Wacker
- 2006–2007: Amkar Perm
- 2008–2009: Lokomotiv Moscow
- 2009–2011: Amkar Perm
- 2013–2017: Terek Grozny
- 2018–2019: Akhmat Grozny
- 2020–2021: Ufa
- 2023–2025: Rubin Kazan
- * Club domestic league appearances and goals

Rashid Mamatkulovich Rakhimov (Russian: Рашид Маматкулович Рахи́мов, Tajik: Рашид Маматқулович Раҳимов, romanized: Rashid Mamatqulovich Rahimov; born 18 March 1965) is a Tajikistani professional football manager and a former player.

== Playing career ==
=== Club ===
Much of Rakhimov's playing career is related to Pamir Dushanbe, where he was playing from 1980 to 1991, the last three seasons in Soviet Top League. After that he moved on to playing in such clubs as Spartak Moscow, Real Valladolid, Lokomotiv Moscow. In the later part of his career as a footballer he moved to Austria, playing for FK Austria Wien, Admira Wacker and SV Ried, where he was very popular with fans.

=== International ===
Rakhimov played four matches for Russian national team during 1994–1995. He played for the national team of his country of birth Tajikistan in 1992 and 1996.

== Management career ==
After Rakhimov finished playing, he was invited to struggling Admira Wacker as a manager in 2002. He saved the club from relegation, but quit in 2004.

In 2006, he was invited to FC Amkar Perm, which was also facing relegation. After an impressive run of performances, Amkar stayed in Premier League, and Rakhimov signed a 2-year contract with the club in the beginning of 2007 season.

On 6 December 2007, he signed a three-year contract with FC Lokomotiv Moscow and was fired on 28 April 2009. After nineteen months, he returned to Amkar Perm.

On 28 September 2011, Amkar Perm president Gennady Shilov confirmed that the club had accepted Rakhimov's resignation.

On 5 September 2018, he rejoined FC Akhmat Grozny (the team was called Terek during his previous time at the club). He resigned from Akhmat on 30 September 2019 with club in 15th place. In 2016–17 season, he sent Akhmat to 5th place, which is still the highest ever record in the club's history.

On 11 October 2020, Rakhimov was appointed as head coach of FC Ufa. He resigned from Ufa on 3 April 2021, following a 0–4 loss to FC Dynamo Moscow, with the club still in the same relegation-zone 15th place it was in when Rakhimov took over as manager.

On 12 April 2023, Rakhimov was hired by Rubin Kazan. On 20 May 2023, Rubin secured promotion back to the Russian Premier League after one season at the second tier. On 28 May 2024, Rakhimov's contract with Rubin was extended to June 2026. On 13 January 2026, Rubin sacked Rakhimov, with the club in 7th place in the Premier League.

== Managerial statistics ==
As of match played 6 December 2025

Managerial record by team and tenure
Team	Nat	From	To	Record				
Team	Nat	From	To	G	W	D	L	Win %
Admira Wacker	(Austria)	10 December 2002	11 May 2004	51	17	13	21	33.33
Amkar Perm	(Russia)	4 September 2006	5 December 2007	47	20	13	14	42.55
Lokomotiv Moscow	(Russia)	6 December 2007	28 April 2009	40	16	11	13	40.00
Amkar Perm	(Russia)	5 September 2009	28 September 2011	70	19	17	34	27.14
Terek Grozny	(Russia)	7 November 2013	22 May 2017	113	46	27	40	40.71
Akhmat Grozny	(Russia)	5 September 2018	30 September 2019	38	13	11	14	34.21
FC Ufa	(Russia)	11 October 2020	3 April 2021	16	4	2	10	25.00
Rubin Kazan	(Russia)	12 April 2023	13 January 2026	107	42	24	41	39.25
Total				482	177	118	187	36.72

== Honours ==
=== Player ===
Spartak Moscow

- Russian Top League (2): 1992, 1994

=== Manager ===
Individual

- Russian Premier League coach of the month (with FC Rubin Kazan): November/December 2023
