= Anatoli Ivanov (footballer, born 1940) =

Russian footballer and coach

Personal information
- Full name: Anatoli Nikolayevich Ivanov
- Date of birth: 25 May 1940
- Place of birth: Shakhty, Soviet Union (now Russia)
- Date of death: 26 May 2019 (aged 79)
- Position: Goalkeeper

Senior career*
Years	Team	Apps	(Gls)
1958–1959	FC Shakhtyor Shakhty	30	(0)
1960–1970	FC SKA Rostov-on-Don	189	(0)
1976–1977	TSG Neustrelitz	2	(0)

Managerial career
- 1980: FC SKA Novosibirsk
- 1981: FC SKA Rostov-on-Don (assistant)
- 1982–1983: FC Atommash Volgodonsk
- 1984–1987: FC Baltika Kaliningrad
- 1988: FC Sokol Saratov
- 1994: FC Baltika Kaliningrad
- 1999: FC Baltika Kaliningrad (team director)
- 1999: FC Baltika Kaliningrad
- * Club domestic league appearances and goals

Anatoli Nikolayevich Ivanov (Russian: Анатолий Николаевич Иванов; born 25 May 1940; died 26 May 2019) was a Russian football player and coach.
