= PFC Spartak Nalchik =

Russian football club

- Full name: Professional Football Club; Spartak Nalchik
- Nicknames: Red-White, Djigits (Horsemen), Southerners
- Founded: 1935; 91 years ago
- Ground: Spartak Stadium, Nalchik
- Capacity: 14,149
- Chairman: Aslan Khuranov (caretaker)
- Manager: Murat Yemkuzhev
- League: Russian Second League, Division B, Group 1
- 2026: 9th
- Website: spartak-nalchik.ru
Home colours	Away colours

PFC Spartak Nalchik (Russian: Профессиональный футбольный клуб "Спартак Нальчик") is a Russian association football club based in Nalchik that plays in the fourth-tier Russian Second League Division B. They played in the Russian Premier League between 2006 and 2012.

== History ==
FC Spartak Nalchik was founded in 1935 and played in the regional "B-class" tournament. In 1965, Spartak won the competition and was promoted into "A-class", second group. Spartak played in that tournament from 1966 to 1970.

After reorganization of Soviet league system, Spartak played in the Soviet Second League (1971, 1977, 1978, 1981–1989) and Soviet First League (1972–1976, 1979, 1980), having been promoted and relegated several times. In 1990 and 1991 Spartak played in the Buffer League. The club's best result was a 14th position in the First League in 1974 and 1975.

The club won the title of champions of RSFSR in 1965 and 1970.

In 1992, Spartak Nalchik was entitled to enter Russian First Division. The club was relegated after the 1993 season, but earned promotion back in 1995, after two seasons spent in the Russian Second Division. From 1996 to 2005 Spartak again played in the First Division. In 2005, the team finished second and earned promotion to the Premier League. They were the leaders of Premier League between 10th and 15th rounds in 2006 season. Finally they finished 9th. They led the league again from the 3rd to 8th round in the 2010 season.

Spartak has also been known as "Automobilist" (in 1969–1972) and "Elbrus" (in 1976).

In 2011–12 season the team finished 16th and was relegated to First division.

In January 2014, Minister for Sport and Tourism of Kabardino-Balkaria announced the beginning of bankruptcy proceedings for the club. Later the same month, the Government of Kabardino-Balkaria allocated additional 61 mln roubles for the team from Republican budget.

After the 2013–14 season, the club volunteered to be relegated to the third-tier Russian Professional Football League due to lack of necessary financing for the FNL.

They won their PFL zone in the 2015–16 season and were promoted back to the FNL for the 2016–17, but stayed up only for one season before being relegated back to PFL.

=== Domestic history ===
Season	League									Russian Cup	Top goalscorer		Manager
Season	Div.	Pos.	Pl.	W	D	L	GS	GA	P	Russian Cup	Name	League	Manager
1992	2nd, West	8	34	16	3	15	58	47	35		Eduard Kugotov	19	Kazbek Tlyarugov
1993	2nd, West	16	42	13	8	21	52	73	34	Round of 128	Eduard Kugotov	9	Kazbek Tlyarugov
1994	3rd, West	3	40	28	3	9	98	33	59	Round of 64	Aslan Goplachev	29	Yuri Naurzokov
1995	3rd, West	1	42	30	6	6	127	49	96	Round of 256	Oleg Kirimov	22	Boris Sinitsyn
1996	2nd	9	42	17	8	17	62	59	59	Round of 512	Alexander Zarutsky	13	Viktor Kumykov
1997	2nd	4	42	23	3	16	74	53	72	Round of 64	Alexander Zarutsky	12	Viktor Kumykov
1998	2nd	15	42	15	11	16	49	52	56	Round of 64	Ali Alchagirov	9	Viktor Kumykov; Viktor Zernov; Aslanbek Khantsev
1999	2nd	13	42	17	5	20	49	61	56	Round of 256	Vaso Sepashvili	14	Aslanbek Khantsev
2000	2nd	5	38	13	9	16	37	44	48	Round of 16	Sergei Tsybul	7	Aslanbek Khantsev; Sergei Ponomaryov
2001	2nd	5	34	17	4	13	48	37	55	Round of 64	Maxim Autlev	12	Soferbi Yeshugov
2002	2nd	6	34	14	11	9	42	30	53	Round of 64	Roman Uzdenov	12	Soferbi Yeshugov
2003	2nd	15	42	14	10	18	34	49	52	Round of 16	Anzor Dzamikhov	9	Soferbi Yeshugov
2004	2nd	12	42	16	10	16	53	46	58	Round of 64	Anzor Kunizhev	9	Yuri Krasnozhan
2005	2nd	2	42	25	11	6	67	36	86	Round of 64	Andriy Poroshyn	18	Yuri Krasnozhan
2006	1st	9	30	11	8	11	33	32	41	Round of 32	Serhiy Pylypchuk; Roman Kontsedalov; Eduard Korchagin	5	Yuri Krasnozhan
2007	1st	12	30	8	9	13	29	38	33	Round of 32	Ricardo Jesus	7	Yuri Krasnozhan
2008	1st	12	30	8	8	14	30	39	32	Quarter-final	Rustem Kalimullin	5	Yuri Krasnozhan
2009	1st	11	30	8	11	11	36	33	35	Round of 32	Shamil Asildarov; Leandro	8	Yuri Krasnozhan
2010	1st	6	30	12	8	10	40	37	44	Round of 32	Vladimir Dyadyun	10	Yuri Krasnozhan
2011–12	1st	16	44	7	13	24	39	60	34	Round of 32	Roman Kontsedalov	7	Vladimir Eshtrekov; Sergei Tashuev; Timur Shipshev
2012–13	2nd	3	32	15	8	9	32	27	53	Round of 32	Igor Koronov; Aleksei Medvedev	6	Timur Shipshev
2013–14	2nd	10	36	13	12	11	36	34	51	Round of 64	Alikhan Shavayev	5	Shipshev; Bidzhiyev
2014–15	3rd South	8	22	7	5	10	26	27	26	Third round	Magomed Guguyev	14	Khasanbi Bidzhiyev
2015–16	3rd South	1	26	19	6	1	43	6	63	Round of 32	Magomed Guguyev	8	Khasanbi Bidzhiyev
2016–17	2nd	19	38	7	17	14	26	37	38	Round of 32			Khasanbi Bidzhiyev
2017–18	3rd South	7	32	11	11	10	36	27	44	Round of 16	Islam Tlupov	9	
2018–19	3rd South	6	28	11	10	7	39	29	43	Second Round			
2019–20	3rd South	6	19	4	7	8	18	37	19	Third round	Kantemir Batsev	10	

== Current squad ==
As of 11 September 2026, according to the official Second League website.

Note: Flags indicate national team as defined under FIFA eligibility rules; some limited exceptions apply. Players may hold more than one non-FIFA nationality.

No.	Pos.	Nation	Player
1	GK	RUS	Khusey Karkayev
2	DF	RUS	Anzor Keshtov
3	DF	RUS	Magomed Piriyev
4	DF	RUS	Ismail Zhaboyev
5	MF	RUS	Amur Khatsukov
6	MF	RUS	Islam Pekov
7	FW	RUS	Soslan Lysenko
8	MF	RUS	David Sarbashev
9	FW	RUS	Akhmed Kumyshev
10	FW	RUS	Magomed Ibragimov
11	FW	RUS	Islam Tlupov
13	DF	RUS	Khakim Kadykoyev
16	GK	RUS	Aslanbek Kumykov
17	FW	RUS	Adam Cherkesov
18	FW	RUS	Renat Apshatsev
19	MF	RUS	Amirkhan Selyayev

No.	Pos.	Nation	Player
20	MF	RUS	Amir Kantsaliyev
21	GK	RUS	Amir Loov
22	MF	RUS	Andemir Goguzokov
27	MF	RUS	Tamerlan Dzugulov
30	DF	RUS	Eldar Shogenov
35	GK	RUS	Damir Bazhev
40	DF	RUS	Andrei Ivashin
70	MF	RUS	Islam-Bek Gubzhokov
71	FW	RUS	Ismail Kushkhov
77	DF	RUS	Renat Balkizov
88	MF	RUS	Alikhan Malkanduyev
90	MF	RUS	Kantemir Bolotokov
96	MF	RUS	Inaroko Tutov
97	FW	RUS	Alan Khachirov
98	DF	RUS	Tamerlan Girzishev
99	MF	RUS	Aslan Urusov

== Notable players ==
Had international caps for their respective countries. Players whose name is listed in bold represented their countries while playing for Spartak.

Russia

- (Russia) Georgi Dzhikiya
- (Russia) Viktor Fayzulin
- (Russia) Zaur Khapov
- (Russia) Veniamin Mandrykin
- (Russia) Denis Popov
- (Russia) Igor Portnyagin
- (Russia) **Viktor Vasin**
- (Russia) Artyom Yenin
- (Russia) Denis Yevsikov

Europe

- (Armenia) **Karen Grigoryan**
- (Armenia) **Hrayr Mkoyan**
- (Armenia) **Albert Sarkisyan**
- (Azerbaijan) **Ruslan İdiqov**
- (Belarus) **Artem Kontsevoy**
- (Belarus) Konstantin Kovalenko
- (Belarus) **Vitali Lanko**
- (Belarus) Aleksey Skvernyuk
- (Bosnia and Herzegovina) Ricardo Baiano
- (Bosnia and Herzegovina) Mario Jurić
- (Bosnia and Herzegovina) **Adnan Zahirović**
- (Estonia) Mark Švets
- (Finland) **Otto Fredrikson**
- (Georgia (country)) **Aleksandre Amisulashvili**
- (Georgia (country)) Iuri Gabiskiria
- (Georgia (country)) **Gogita Gogua**
- (Georgia (country)) **Giorgi Oniani**
- (Georgia (country)) Vaso Sepashvili
- (Georgia (country)) **David Siradze**
- (Iceland) Hannes Sigurðsson
- (Kazakhstan) **David Loria**
- (Kazakhstan) **Kazbek Geteriev**
- (Kazakhstan) Arsen Tlekhugov
- (Kazakhstan) Roman Uzdenov
- (Latvia) **Aleksandrs Koliņko**
- (Lithuania) **Darvydas Šernas**
- (Lithuania) Giedrius Žutautas
- (Moldova) **Eugeniu Cebotaru**
- (Moldova) Valeriu Ciupercă
- (Moldova) **Viorel Frunză**
- (Moldova) **Stanislav Namașco**
- (Montenegro) **Miodrag Džudović**
- (Montenegro) **Milan Jovanović**
- (Slovenia) Darijan Matič
- (Slovenia) Dejan Rusič
- (Ukraine) Dmytro Topchiev

Africa

- (Ivory Coast) **Tiassé Koné**
- (Democratic Republic of the Congo) **Ngasanya Ilongo**
- (Zimbabwe) Newton Ben Katanha

Asia

- (Afghanistan) **Sharif Mukhammad**
- (Jordan) Anzour Nafash
- (Uzbekistan) **Marat Bikmaev**

== FС Spartak-d Nalchik ==
In 1996 and 1997, the reserve team Spartak-d Nalchik played in the professional fourth-level Russian Third League. Earlier, in 1995, for some time the subsidiary team of PFC Spartak Nalchik was FC Spartak-2 Nartkala, which also played in the Russian Third League.
