= Aslanbek Khantsev =

Russian footballer and coach

Personal information
- Full name: Aslanbek Sultanovich Khantsev
- Date of birth: 28 November 1960 (age 65)
- Position: Midfielder

Youth career
- Nartkala

Senior career*
Years	Team	Apps	(Gls)
1979–1980	Spartak Nalchik	7	(0)
1980	Selmash Kovel		
1983–1992	Spartak Nalchik	309	(14)
1993	Avtozapchast Baksan	20	(1)
1993	Spartak Nalchik	20	(1)

Managerial career
- 1994–1998: Spartak Nalchik (assistant)
- 1998: Spartak Nalchik (caretaker)
- 1998: Spartak Nalchik (assistant)
- 1998–2000: Spartak Nalchik
- 2001–2002: Nart Nartkala
- * Club domestic league appearances and goals

Aslanbek Sultanovich Khantsev (Russian: Асланбек Султанович Ханцев; born 28 November 1960) is a Russian professional football coach and a former player.

Khantsev managed Russian First Division side PFC Spartak Nalchik from 1998 to 2000.
