= Anatoly Baidachny =

Russian football manager

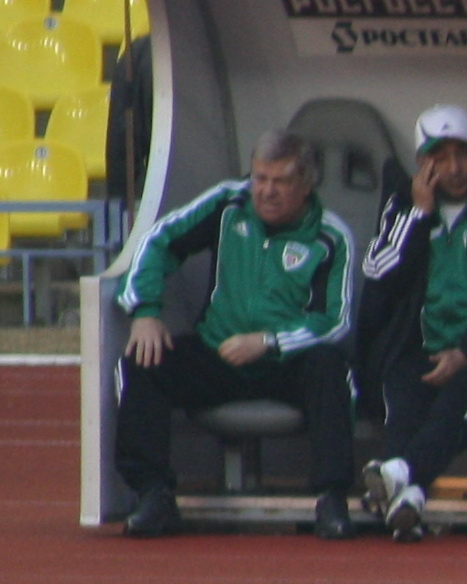

Personal information
- Full name: Anatoly Nikolayevich Baidachny
- Date of birth: 1 October 1952 (age 74)
- Place of birth: Moscow, USSR
- Height: 1.69 m (5 ft 7 in)
- Position: Forward

Youth career
- FSh Obninsk

Senior career*
Years	Team	Apps	(Gls)
1969–1974	Dinamo Moscow	64	(17)
1974–1979	Dinamo Minsk	156	(37)
Total		220	(54)

International career
1972	USSR	5	(0)

Managerial career
- 1980–1985: Dnepr Mogilev
- 1988–1989: Zaria Voroshilovgrad
- 1990–1991: Kristall Kherson
- 1992–1993: Anagennisi Dherynia
- 1993–1995: Syria U20
- 1995–1996: Al Yarmouk
- 1996: Tiligul-Tiras Tiraspol
- 1997: Dinamo Minsk
- 1998–1999: Zhemchuzhina Sochi
- 2000–2001: Chernomorets Novorossiysk
- 2001–2002: Rostselmash Rostov-on-Don
- 2003: Dinamo Minsk
- 2003–2005: Belarus
- 2006–2007: Darida Minsk Raion
- 2010: Terek Grozny
- 2011–2012: Fakel Voronezh
- 2012: Rostov
- 2021: Ararat-Armenia
- * Club domestic league appearances and goals

Anatoly Nikolayevich Baidachny (Russian: Анатолий Николаевич Байдачный; born 1 October 1952) is a Russian football manager.

== International career ==
Baidachny made his debut for USSR on 30 April 1972 in the UEFA Euro 1972 quarterfinal against Yugoslavia. He won his last cap in the Final against West Germany on 14 June, when he was 19.

== Coaching career ==
In January 2010 the former Belarus national football team and FC Darida Minsk Raion coach has joined FC Terek Grozny, he replaced Shahin Diniyev, who already managed Terek's reserves team. In January 2011 he was replaced at Terek by Ruud Gullit.

On 24 March 2021, Ararat-Armenia announced Baidachny as their new head coach, leaving the role 2 1/2 months later, on 8 June 2021, by mutual consent, having won just three of his twelve games in charge.

== Honors ==
- UEFA Euro 1972 runner-up.
