= Gennadi Soshenko =

Russian footballer

Personal information
- Full name: Gennadi Vladimirovich Soshenko
- Date of birth: November 15, 1958 (age 67)
- Height: 1.76 m (5 ft 9 1/2 in)
- Positions: Midfielder; defender

Senior career*
Years	Team	Apps	(Gls)
1981–1982	FC Dynamo Stavropol	35	(2)
1983	FC Salyut Belgorod	31	(10)
1984–1989	FC Fakel Voronezh	209	(14)
1990	FC Kotayk Abovian	20	(0)
1990–1991	FC Fakel Voronezh	24	(1)
1992	FC Energomash Belgorod	1	(0)
1992	FC Tekstilshchik-d Kamyshin	1	(0)
1992–1993	Skonto FC	7	(2)
1993	FC Tekstilshchik Kamyshin	0	(0)
1993	FC Avangard Kamyshin	9	(0)

Managerial career
- 1995–1998: FC Fakel Voronezh (assistant)
- 2000: FC Metallurg Lipetsk (assistant)
- 2000: FC Metallurg Lipetsk (caretaker)
- 2001–2002: FC Metallurg Krasnoyarsk (assistant)
- 2002: FC Metallurg Krasnoyarsk (caretaker)
- 2002–2003: FC Fakel-Voronezh Voronezh (assistant)
- 2003: FC Fakel-Voronezh Voronezh (caretaker)
- 2005–2007: FC Lokomotiv Liski
- 2008: FC Dynamo-Voronezh Voronezh (director)
- 2009: FC FSA Voronezh
- 2010–2013: FC Fakel Voronezh (assistant)
- * Club domestic league appearances and goals

Gennadi Vladimirovich Soshenko (Russian: Геннадий Владимирович Сошенко; born 15 November 1958) is a Russian professional football coach and a former player. Currently, he is an assistant coach with FC Fakel Voronezh.

== Career ==
Soshenko played youth football with local side FC Salyut Belgorod. After he entered military service, Soshenko was assigned to play for Soviet First League side FC Dynamo Stavropol. After three years in Stavropol, he returned to Salyut Belgorod where he scored ten league goals during the 1983 season. Soshenko earned a move to FC Fakel Voronezh where he enjoyed his greatest footballing successes.

== Honours ==
- Latvian Higher League champion: 1992, 1993.
