= Andrey Talalayev =

Russian footballer (born 1972)

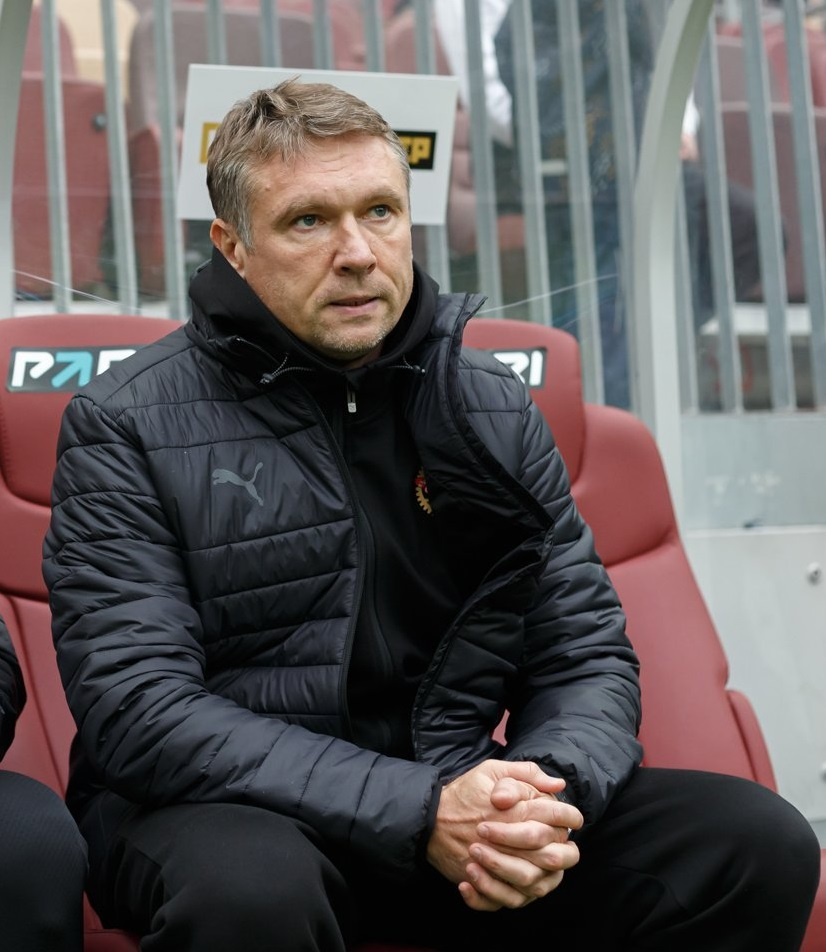
- Talalayev with Torpedo Moscow in 2022

Personal information
- Full name: Andrey Viktorovich Talalayev
- Date of birth: 5 October 1972 (age 54)
- Place of birth: Moscow, Soviet Union
- Height: 1.84 m (6 ft 0 in)
- Position: Forward

Team information
- Current team: Baltika Kaliningrad (head coach)

Senior career*
Years	Team	Apps	(Gls)
1991–1995	Torpedo Moscow	64	(9)
1992–1993	→ Torpedo-d Moscow	2	(0)
1994	→ KAMAZ Naberezhnye Chelny (loan)	6	(0)
1995	→ Torpedo-d Moscow	7	(3)
1996–1997	Tyumen	37	(13)
1997	Tom Tomsk	22	(7)
1997–1998	Treviso	18	(1)
1999	Lokomotiv Nizhny Novgorod	1	(0)
1999	Tom Tomsk	10	(1)
Total		167	(34)

International career
1992–1994	Russia U21	10	(1)

Managerial career
- 1999–2003: SDYuShOR Torpedo-Metallurg
- 2004: Spartak Moscow (assistant)
- 2005–2010: Russia (born in 1990)
- 2009–2010: Russia U15
- 2010: Russia U20
- 2011: Rostov (U21)
- 2011: Rostov (caretaker)
- 2012–2013: Kuban Krasnodar (assistant)
- 2014: Rosich Moscow oblast
- 2014–2016: Volga Nizhny Novgorod
- 2016–2018: Tambov
- 2018–2019: Pyunik
- 2019–2020: Khimki
- 2020: Krylia Sovetov Samara
- 2020–2022: Akhmat Grozny
- 2022–2023: Torpedo Moscow
- 2023–2024: Khimki
- 2024–: Baltika Kaliningrad
- * Club domestic league appearances and goals

Andrey Viktorovich Talalayev (Russian: Андрей Викторович Талалаев; born 5 October 1972) is a Russian professional football coach, television commentator and a former player. He is the head coach of Baltika Kaliningrad.

== Club career ==
Talalayev made his professional debut in the Soviet Top League in 1991 for Torpedo Moscow.

== Managerial career ==
On 12 June 2018, Talalayev signed a two-year contract with the Armenian club Pyunik.

On 2 December 2018, during Pyunik's match against Gandzasar Kapan, Talalayev was sent off for insulting the fourth official. Talalayev was subsequently banned from football until the end of the season, 31 May 2019, on 6 December 2018.

On 10 April 2019, he returned to Russia, signing with Khimki. He resigned from Khimki on 23 January 2020 with the club in third place after the club announced their budget will be reduced.

On 28 June 2020, he signed a two-year contract with Russian Premier League club Krylia Sovetov Samara, with the club in the last position in the standings. At the end of the 2019–20 season, Krylia Sovetov was relegated and Talalayev resigned on 25 July 2020.

On 26 July 2020, he joined Russian Premier League club Akhmat Grozny. That was the second time in 15 months that he replaced Igor Shalimov as a manager (Shalimov was the manager of FC Khimki before Talalayev was hired there). Talalayev was dismissed by Akhmat on 11 September 2022.

On 13 October 2022, Talalayev was hired by Torpedo Moscow. He left Torpedo by mutual consent on 22 March 2023, with the team still in last place.

On 11 April 2023, Talalayev returned to Khimki on a five-year contract, with the club in relegation zone. Khimki became the third team Talalayev managed in the 2022–23 RPL season (and he became the fifth coach to lead Khimki in the season). On 22 May 2023, Khimki lost their chances of avoiding relegation. Torpedo was also relegated nine days prior, giving Talalayev a distinction of coaching two separate clubs that were relegated from the RPL in the same season. Khimki returned to the Russian Premier League in one season under Talalayev's helm. He left Khimki on 20 June 2024.

On 6 September 2024, Talalayev was hired by Baltika Kaliningrad in the Russian First League. On 10 May 2025, Baltika secured promotion back to the Russian Premier League. In the 2025–26 Russian Premier League season, Talalayev led Baltika to 6th place, which was the best league position in club's history.

== Honours ==
- Soviet Top League bronze: 1991.
- Russian Cup winner: 1993.

== European club competitions ==
With FC Torpedo Moscow.

- UEFA Cup 1991–92: 3 games.
- UEFA Cup 1992–93: 3 games, 1 goal.
- UEFA Cup Winners' Cup 1993–94: 2 games.
