= Leonid Markevich =

Russian footballer

Personal information
- Full name: Leonid Leonidovich Markevich
- Date of birth: 15 August 1973 (age 53)
- Place of birth: Dolgoprudny, Russian SFSR
- Height: 1.79 m (5 ft 10 1/2 in)
- Positions: Forward; midfielder

Senior career*
| Years | Team | Apps | (Gls) |
| 1990–1991 | PFC CSKA-2 Moscow | 3 | (0) |
| 1991 | PFC CSKA Moscow | 0 | (0) |
| 1992–1993 | PFC CSKA-d Moscow | 64 | (28) |
| 1993 | PFC CSKA Moscow | 3 | (0) |
| 1994–1998 | FC Sokol Saratov | 169 | (58) |
| 1998 | FC Gazovik-Gazprom Izhevsk | 10 | (1) |
| 1999–2002 | FC Sokol Saratov | 93 | (22) |
| 2002 | FC Metallurg Lipetsk | 13 | (5) |
| 2003 | FC Sokol Saratov | 15 | (2) |
| 2004 | FC Salyut-Energia Belgorod | 20 | (2) |
| 2005–2009 | FC Sokol Saratov | 85 | (11) |
- * Club domestic league appearances and goals

Leonid Leonidovich Markevich (Russian: Леонид Леонидович Маркевич; born 15 August 1973) is a former Russian professional football player.

== Club career ==
He made his debut in the Russian Premier League in 1993 for PFC CSKA Moscow.

== Honours ==
- Russian Cup finalist: 1994.
