= FC Akhmat Grozny =

Russian football club

Akhmat Grozny
- Full name: Республиканский футбольный клуб «Ахмат» Republican Football Club; Akhmat
- Founded: 1958; 68 years ago
- Ground: Akhmat Arena
- Capacity: 30,597
- President: Yakub Zakriyev
- Head coach: Rolan Gusev
- League: Russian Premier League
- 2025–26: Russian Premier League, 9th of 16
- Website: fc-akhmat.ru
Home colours	Away colours

Republican Football Club Akhmat (Chechen: футболан клуб Ахмат Соьлжа-ГӀала; Russian: Республиканский футбольный клуб Ахмат Грозный), commonly known as Akhmat Grozny, and formerly as Terek Grozny from 1958 to 2017, is a Russian professional football club based in Grozny that plays in the Russian Premier League.

== History ==
The club was founded in 1946, as Dynamo; it changed its name in 1948 to Neftyanik and in 1958 to Terek. On 7 June 2017, the team was renamed Akhmat, after Akhmad Kadyrov, former President of the Chechen Republic.

In the 1990s the club was disbanded for some time due to the war in Chechnya. From the 1990s to 2007 the club played its home games in the neighbouring resort city of Pyatigorsk, Stavropol Krai.

They won the Russian Cup by beating Krylya Sovetov Samara in the final and the Russian First Division in 2004. In 2004 they advanced through the UEFA Cup qualification by beating the Polish team Lech Poznań 1–0 in both legs but lost to Swiss outfit FC Basel in the first round. They played in the Russian Premier League in 2005 but were relegated after finishing last. Terek finished second in the First Division in 2007 and were promoted back into the Premier League.

Before the start of the 2008 Premier League season, the Russian Football Union granted Terek the right to host Premier League matches in Grozny. On 3 July 2008, Terek signed three Romanian players at once: Andrei Margaritescu (Dinamo București), Florentin Petre (CSKA Sofia) and Daniel Pancu (Rapid București). Terek finished 12th in the 2010 Russian Premier League season.

A new stadium has been built for the club.

Cameroonian FC Lotus-Terek Yaoundé, founded by Terek player Guy Stephane Essame and coached by Thomas Libiih, is a farm team of the Russian club.

In January 2011 the club signed former Dutch international Ruud Gullit to an 18-month contract to manage the club. On 14 June 2011 Gullit was sacked for poor results.

On 30 October 2017, manager Oleg Kononov resigned, with Mikhail Galaktionov taking over in a caretaker capacity, before being announced as Akhmat's permanent manager on 14 December 2017.

On 30 September 2019, after a 2–0 away defeat to Sochi, Rashid Rakhimov resigned as manager, with Igor Shalimov being appointed as Rakhimov's replacement the same day. On 26 July 2020, Igor Shalimov's contract as manager expired and he left Akhmat Grozny, to be replaced by Andrei Talalayev.

On 11 September 2022, Andrei Talalayev was relieved of his duties as Head Coach, with Yury Nagaytsev taking over in a caretaker capacity. On 22 September 2022, Sergei Tashuyev was announced as Akhmat Grozny's new permanent Head Coach.

In the 2024–25 season, Akhmat finished 14th and qualified for the relegation play-offs. Akhmat defeated Ural Yekaterinburg in the play-offs and remained in the Premier League.

=== League ===
==== USSR ====
Season	Div.	Pos.	Pl.	W	D	L	GS	GA	P	Cup	Europe	Top scorer (league)	Head coach
1990	2nd, "Center"	13	42	17	7	18	51	52	41	—	—	(Soviet Union) Masudov – 13	(Soviet Union) Dyachenko
1991	2nd, "Center"	5	42	19	11	12	55	40	49	—	—	(Soviet Union) Gilagaev – 11	(Soviet Union) Tarkhanov

==== Russia ====
Season	Div.	Pos.	Pl.	W	D	L	GS	GA	P	Cup	Europe		Top scorer (league)	Head coach
1992	2nd, "West"	5	34	18	5	11	63	43	41	—	—		(Russia) Kamnev – 16	(Russia) K. Alkhanov
1993	2nd, "West"	11	42	20	4	18	76	63	44	R16	—			(Russia) K. Alkhanov
1994	3rd, "South"	21	40	7	5	28	22	83	19	R32	—		(Russia) Neduev – 8	(Russia) Mikheev
1995	—									R512	—			
1995–2001: disbanded due to war
2001	3rd, "South"	5	38	22	7	9	57	29	73	—	—		(Russia) Mazaev – 12	(Azerbaijan) Diniyev (Russia) Dzaitiev
2002	3rd, "South"	1	40	36	1	3	98	20	109	R128	—		(Russia) Mazaev – 26	(Russia) Platonov (Russia) Mikheev (Russia) Koreshkov
2003	2nd	4	42	25	10	7	56	21	85	R256	—		(Turkmenistan) Bayramov – 8 (Russia) Zernov – 8	(Russia) Talgayev
2004	2nd	1	42	32	4	6	70	22	100	W	—		(Russia) Fedkov – 38	(Russia) Talgayev
2005	1st	16	30	5	5	20	20	50	14 (−6)	R32	UC	1R	(Russia) Adamov – 7	(Russia) Talgayev (Russia) Tarkhanov
2006	2nd	8	42	18	8	16	48	47	62	R16	—		4 players – 5	(Russia) Tarkhanov (Russia) V. Shevchenko (Russia) Talgayev
2007	2nd	2	42	28	6	8	69	27	90	R32	—		(Russia) Zubko – 8	(Russia) Talgayev
2008	1st	10	30	9	8	13	28	42	35	R16	—		(Russia) Kuzmichyov – 5	(Russia) Nazarenko (Ukraine) Grozny
2009	1st	12	30	9	6	15	33	48	33	R16	—		(Russia) Lakhiyalov – 11	(Ukraine) Grozny (Azerbaijan) Diniyev
2010	1st	12	30	8	9	13	28	34	33	R16	—		(Russia) Asildarov – 9	(Russia) Baidachny
2011–12	1st	11	44	14	10	20	45	62	52	QF	—		(Brazil) Maurício – 9	(Netherlands) Gullit (Russia) Baytiyev (Russia) Cherchesov
2012–13	1st	8	30	14	6	10	38	40	48	QF	—		(Brazil) Aílton – 7	(Russia) Cherchesov
2013–14	1st	12	30	8	9	13	27	33	33	QF	—		(Brazil) Aílton – 8	(Russia) Krasnozhan (Kazakhstan) Talgayev (Russia) Cherchesov
2014–15	1st	9	30	10	7	13	30	30	37	R32	—		(Brazil) Aílton – 5	(Tajikistan) Rakhimov
2015–16	1st	7	30	11	11	8	35	30	44	QF	—		(Poland) Rybus – 8	(Tajikistan) Rakhimov
2016–17	1st	5	30	14	6	10	38	35	48	R16	—		(Albania) Balaj – 9	(Tajikistan) Rakhimov
2017–18	1st	9	30	10	9	11	30	34	39	R32	—		(Russia) Mitrishev – 5	(Russia) Kononov (Russia) Galaktionov (Russia) Lediakhov
2018–19	1st	8	30	11	9	10	29	30	42	R16	—		(Russia) Ivanov – 5 (Senegal) Mbengue – 5	(Russia) Lediakhov (Russia) İdiqov (Tajikistan) Rakhimov
2019–20	1st	13	30	7	10	13	27	46	31	QF	—		(Albania) Roshi – 7	(Tajikistan) Rakhimov (Russia) Shalimov
2020–21	1st	11	30	11	7	12	36	38	40	SF	—		(Russia) Ilyin – 9	(Russia) Talalayev
2021–22	1st	7	30	13	3	14	36	38	42	GS	—		(Russia) Utkin – 9	(Russia) Talalayev
2022–23	1st	5	30	15	5	10	51	39	50	Regions path QF Stage 2	—		(Burkina Faso) Konaté – 11	(Russia) Talalayev (Russia) Nagaytsev (Caretaker) (Russia) Tashuyev
2023–24	1st	10	30	10	5	15	33	45	35	Regions path QF Stage 2	—		(Burkina Faso) Konaté – 11	(Russia) Tashuyev (Russia) Baytiyev (Caretaker) (Belarus) Romaschenko (Russia) Adiyev
2024–25	1st	14	30	4	13	13	27	48	25	Regions path SF Stage 1	—		(Kazakhstan) Samorodov – 6	(Russia) Adiyev (Russia) Tashuyev (Russia) Shcherbachenko (Caretaker)
2025–26	1st	9	30	9	10	11	35	39	37	Group stage (RPL path)	—		(Angola) Cacintura – 9	(Russia) Storozhuk (Russia) Cherchesov

=== European ===
Season	Competition	Round	Club	Home	Away	Aggregate
2004–05	UEFA Cup	Second qualifying round	(Poland) Lech Poznań	1–0	1–0	2–0
2004–05	UEFA Cup	First round	(Switzerland) Basel	1–1	0–2	1–3

== Stadium ==
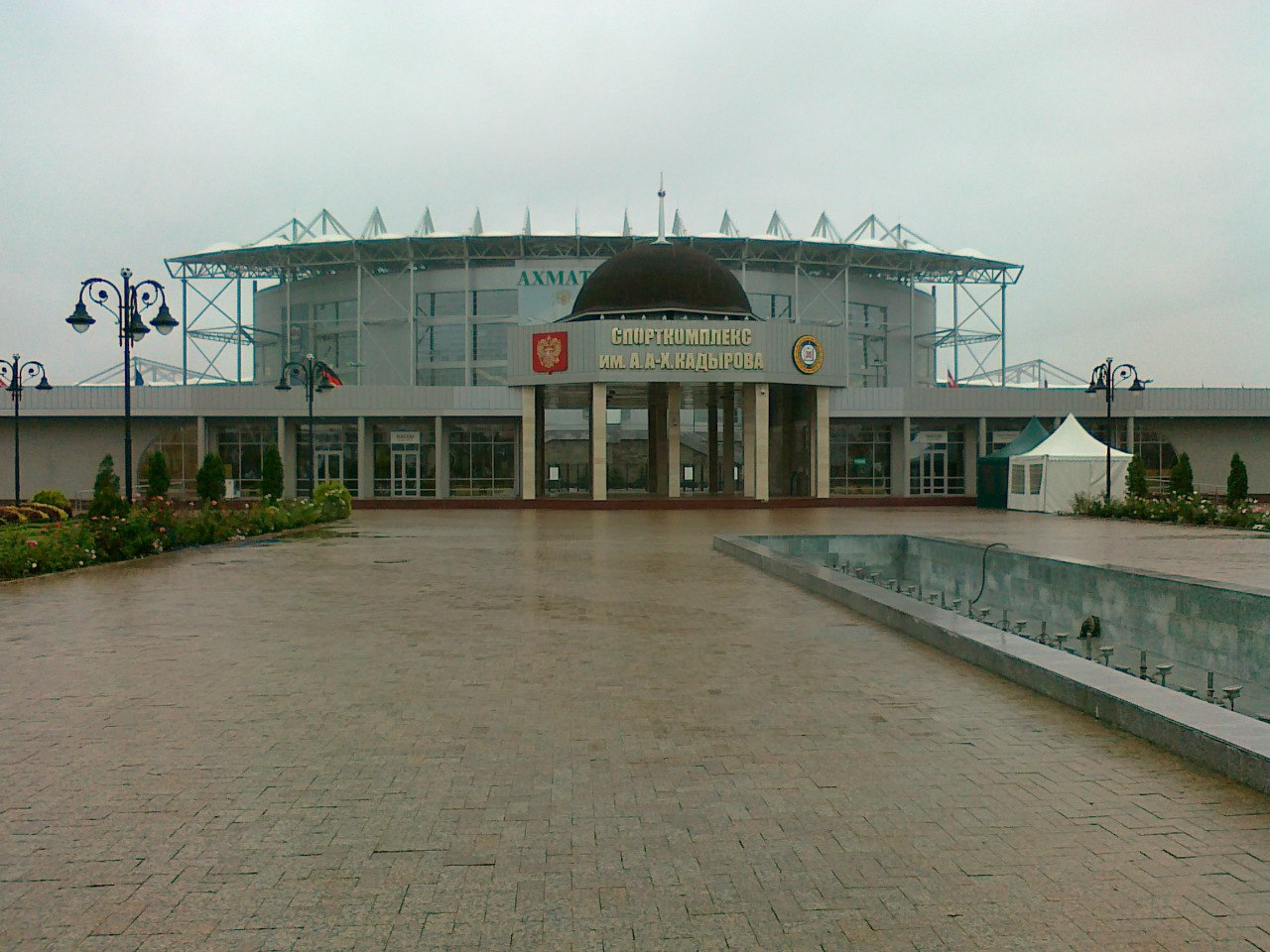
The Akhmat-Arena

Between the 1990s and the 2007 Season, Akhmat Grozny played their home games at the Central Stadium in the neighbouring resort city of Pyatigorsk in Stavropol Krai. At the start of the 2008 season they moved to the Sultan Bilimkhanov Stadium, playing their home games there until the opening of Akhmat-Arena on 20 May 2011, when they beat Anzhi Makhachkala 1–0 in the Russian Premier League.

== Players ==
=== Current squad ===
As of 13 August 2026.

Note: Flags indicate national team as defined under FIFA eligibility rules; some limited exceptions apply. Players may hold more than one non-FIFA nationality.

No.	Pos.	Nation	Player
1	GK	RUS	Vadim Ulyanov
4	DF	RUS	Turpal-Ali Ibishev
5	DF	ALB	Klisman Cake
6	DF	MLI	Kalidou Sidibé
7	MF	RUS	Lechi Sadulayev
8	DF	SRB	Miroslav Bogosavac
10	MF	RUS	Kirill Shchetinin
11	MF	BRA	Ismael Silva
13	FW	BFA	Mohamed Konaté
17	MF	ANG	Egas Cacintura
18	MF	BRA	Júlio Romão
19	MF	RUS	Sergei Pryakhin
20	FW	KAZ	Maksim Samorodov

No.	Pos.	Nation	Player
23	FW	KAZ	Galymzhan Kenzhebek
42	MF	ANG	Manuel Keliano
54	DF	RUS	Kirill Kistenyov (on loan from Krasnodar)
70	MF	RUS	Abakar Gadzhiyev
71	GK	RUS	Rasul Mitsayev
76	FW	ALB	Erald Maksuti
77	FW	RUS	Georgi Melkadze
81	DF	RUS	Maksim Sidorov
87	MF	RUS	Akhmed Elberdov
88	GK	RUS	Giorgi Sheliya
90	DF	SEN	Ousmane Ndong
95	DF	RUS	Arsen Adamov
97	FW	RUS	Aleksey Kasadzhikov

=== Out on loan ===
Note: Flags indicate national team as defined under FIFA eligibility rules; some limited exceptions apply. Players may hold more than one non-FIFA nationality.

No.	Pos.	Nation	Player
—	GK	RUS	Yakhya Magomedov (at Tyumen until 30 June 2027)
—	MF	RUS	Akhmed Davlitgereyev (at Ufa until 30 June 2027)
—	MF	SEN	Papa Amady Gadio (at Novi Pazar until 30 June 2027)

No.	Pos.	Nation	Player
—	FW	MAR	Anas El Mahraoui (at MAS until 30 June 2027)
—	FW	ARG	Mauro Luna Diale (at Unión de Santa Fe until 30 June 2027)
—	FW	ARG	Braian Mansilla (at Rodina Moscow until 30 June 2027)

=== Terek-2 Grozny ===
In 2013, a professional farm club called FC Terek-2 Grozny was created. It played in the third-tier Russian Professional Football League until they were dissolved after the 2015–16 season.

== Honours ==
- Russian Cup

Champions (1): 2003–04

- Russian First Division

Champions (1): 2004

- Russian Second Division

Champions (1): 2002

== Club officials ==
=== Management ===
Manager	(Russia) Stanislav Cherchesov
Assistant manager	(Hungary) Csaba Máté
Goalkeeping coach	(Russia) Ramzan Tsutsulayev
Fitness coach	(Russia) Vladimir Panikov
Doctor	(Russia) Magomedtagir Sugaipov
Team director	(Russia) Ruslan Serbiyev

Source: Russian Premier League club profile

=== Managerial history ===
- Fyodorov 1968
- Smirnov 1969
- Zagretsky 1969
- Morozov 1971
- Belousov 1972 to 73
- Dudayev 1976 to 77
- Frolov 1979
- Kirichenko 1979
- Yeskov 1981
- Mikheyev 1982
- L. Shevchenko 1984 to 85
- Dyachenko 1989 to 90
- Adiyev 1990
- Tarkhanov 1991
- Alkhanov 1992 to 93
- Mikheyev 1994
- Diniyev 2001
- Dzaitiyev^{c} 2001
- Platonov 2002
- Mikheyev^{c} 2002
- Koreshkov 2002
- Talgayev 2003 to 05
- Tarkhanov^{c} 2005 to 06
- Gaisumov^{c} 2006
- V. Shevchenko 2006
- Talgayev 2006 to 07
- Nazarenko 2008

As of match played 30 March 2025

Name	Nat.	From	To	P	W	D	L	GS	GA	%W	Honours	Notes
Vyacheslav Hroznyi	Ukraine	1 June 2008	20 October 2009	45	14	14	17	50	64	31.11		
Shahin Diniyev (c)	Azerbaijan	20 October 2009	December 2009	5	0	0	5	2	10	0.00		Caretaker
Anatoly Baidachny	Russia	January 2010	December 2011	31	8	9	14	28	38	25.81		
Víctor Muñoz	Spain	December 2010	January 2011	0	0	0	0	0	0	—		
Ruud Gullit	Netherlands	18 January 2011	14 June 2011	13	3	3	7	9	17	23.08		
Isa Baytiyev (c)	Russia	15 June 2011	27 September 2011	14	5	3	6	18	23	35.71		Caretaker
Stanislav Cherchesov	Russia	27 September 2011	26 May 2013	53	24	10	19	67	66	45.28		
Yuri Krasnozhan	Russia	26 May 2013	28 October 2017	14	1	6	7	7	14	7.14		
Vait Talgayev (c)	Kazakhstan	29 October 2013	7 November 2013	1	0	0	1	0	1	0.00		Caretaker
Rashid Rakhimov	Tajikistan	7 November 2013	22 May 2017	113	45	29	39	133	122	39.82		
Oleg Kononov	Belarus	22 May 2017	30 October 2017	16	5	3	8	16	24	31.25		
Mikhail Galaktionov (c)	Russia	30 October 2017	14 December 2017	5	2	2	1	6	5	40.00		Caretaker
Mikhail Galaktionov	Russia	14 December 2017	7 April 2018	4	0	1	3	2	7	0.00		
Igor Lediakhov	Russia	7 April 2018	2 September 2018	12	5	4	3	12	9	41.67		
Ruslan İdiqov (c)	Azerbaijan	2 September 2018	5 September 2018	0	0	0	0	0	0	—		Caretaker
Rashid Rakhimov	Tajikistan	5 September 2018	30 September 2019	38	11	13	14	34	46	28.95		
Igor Shalimov	Russia	30 September 2019	26 July 2020	19	5	7	7	20	29	26.32		
Andrei Talalayev	Russia	26 July 2020	11 September 2022	75	31	14	30	97	94	41.33		
Yury Nagaytsev (c)	Latvia	11 September 2022	22 September 2022	2	1	0	1	3	3	50.00		Caretaker
Sergei Tashuyev	Russia	22 September 2022	15 August 2023	32	15	3	14	50	48	46.88		
Miroslav Romaschenko	Belarus	18 August 2023	4 April 2024	23	7	6	10	27	29	30.43		
Magomed Adiyev	Russia	5 April 2024	1 September 2024	19	6	5	8	21	32	31.58		
Sergei Tashuyev	Russia	3 September 2024		21	6	5	10	24	33	28.57		

== Notable players ==
Had international caps for their respective countries. Players whose names are listed in bold represented their countries while playing for Akhmat or Terek.

Russia

- (Russia) Dzhamalutdin Abdulkadyrov
- (Russia) **Arsen Adamov**
- (Russia) Roman Adamov
- (Russia) Maksim Bokov
- (Russia) Viktor Bulatov
- (Russia) Soslan Dzhanayev
- (Russia) Andrei Fedkov
- (Russia) Denis Glushakov
- (Russia) **Turpal-Ali Ibishev**
- (Russia) **Oleg Ivanov**
- (Russia) **Yevgeni Kharin**
- (Russia) Daniil Khlusevich
- (Russia) Oleg Kornaukhov
- (Russia) Aleksei Kosolapov
- (Russia) Fyodor Kudryashov
- (Russia) Daler Kuzyayev
- (Russia) **Georgi Melkadze**
- (Russia) Ruslan Nigmatullin
- (Russia) Gennadiy Nizhegorodov
- (Russia) **Magomed Ozdoyev**
- (Russia) **Lechi Sadulayev**
- (Russia) **Andrei Semyonov**
- (Russia) Roman Sharonov
- (Russia) Aleksandr Shirko
- (Russia) Aleksandr Shmarko
- (Russia) **Anton Shvets**
- (Russia) Oleg Teryokhin
- (Russia) Daniil Utkin
- (Russia) Yevgeni Varlamov
- (Russia) Denis Yevsikov
- (Russia) Rifat Zhemaletdinov
- (Russia) Denis Zubko

Europe

- (Albania) **Bekim Balaj**
- (Albania) Klisman Cake
- (Albania) **Odise Roshi**
- (Armenia) Andrey Movsisyan
- (Armenia) Albert Sarkisyan
- (Azerbaijan) Tarlan Ahmadov
- (Azerbaijan) Shahin Diniyev
- (Azerbaijan) Deni Gaisumov
- (Azerbaijan) Ruslan İdiqov
- (Azerbaijan) Dmitriy Kramarenko
- (Azerbaijan) Ruslan Musayev
- (Azerbaijan) Kazemır Qudiyev
- (Azerbaijan) Vidadi Rzayev
- (Azerbaijan) Narvik Sirkhayev
- (Belarus) Anton Amelchanka
- (Belarus) **Syarhey Amelyanchuk**
- (Belarus) Ilya Chernyak
- (Belarus) **Uladzimir Karytska**
- (Belarus) Andrei Kovalenko
- (Belarus) **Artsyom Radzkow**
- (Belgium) Jonathan Legear
- (Bosnia and Herzegovina) Darko Todorović
- (Bulgaria) **Blagoy Georgiev**
- (Bulgaria) **Valentin Iliev**
- (Bulgaria) Svetoslav Kovachev
- (Croatia) Zoran Nižić
- (Czech Republic) Martin Jiránek
- (Finland) Juhani Ojala
- (Israel) Ze'ev Haimovich
- (Kazakhstan) **Marat Bystrov**
- (Kazakhstan) **Galymzhan Kenzhebek**
- (Kazakhstan) Vakhid Masudov
- (Kazakhstan) **Maksim Samorodov**
- (Kosovo) **Bernard Berisha**
- (Moldova) Andrei Mațiura
- (Moldova) Ion Testemițanu
- (Montenegro) Rade Petrović
- (Poland) **Marcin Komorowski**
- (Poland) Piotr Polczak
- (Poland) **Maciej Rybus**
- (Poland) Damian Szymański
- (Romania) **Gheorghe Grozav**
- (Romania) Gabriel Iancu
- (Romania) Andrei Mărgăritescu
- (Romania) Daniel Pancu
- (Romania) **Florentin Petre**
- (Romania) **Gabriel Torje**
- (Serbia and Montenegro) (Serbia) **Ognjen Koroman**
- (Serbia and Montenegro) Nikola Malbaša
- (Serbia) Miroslav Bogosavac
- (Serbia) Marko Šćepović
- (Slovakia) **Norbert Gyömbér**
- (Slovakia) **Radoslav Zabavník**
- (Slovenia) Igor Lazič
- (Slovenia) **Jalen Pokorn**
- (Turkey) Tamer Tuna
- (Ukraine) **Andriy Dykan**
- (Ukraine) Maksym Levytskyi
- (Ukraine) Volodymyr Savchenko

Africa

- (Burkina Faso) **Mohamed Konaté**
- (Burkina Faso) **Herve Xavier Zengue**
- (Cameroon) Mvondo Atangana
- (Cameroon) **Guy Stephane Essame**
- (Cameroon) Jerry-Christian Tchuissé
- (Cameroon) Adolphe Teikeu
- (Chad) Ezechiel N'Douassel
- (Democratic Republic of the Congo) **Jeremy Bokila**
- (Ghana) **Laryea Kingston**
- (Morocco) Ismaïl Aissati
- (Tunisia) **Nader Ghandri**
- (Zimbabwe) **Musawengosi Mguni**

Asia

- (Australia) Luke Wilkshire
- (Iran) **Milad Mohammadi**
- (Turkmenistan) **Wladimir Baýramow**
- (Turkmenistan) Dmitri Khomukha
- (Turkmenistan) **Wýaçeslaw Krendelew**

South and Central America

- (Bolivia) Juan Carlos Arce
- (Brazil) Ewerthon
- (Venezuela) Wilker Ángel
- (Venezuela) Andrés Ponce
