= Alexander Koreshkov (footballer) =

Russian footballer and coach

Personal information
- Full name: Alexander Ivanovich Koreshkov
- Date of birth: 23 July 1952 (age 74)
- Place of birth: Saratov, Russian SFSR
- Height: 1.71 m (5 ft 7 1/2 in)
- Positions: Midfielder; striker

Youth career
- SEPO Saratov

Senior career*
Years	Team	Apps	(Gls)
1970–1977	Sokol Saratov		(40)
1977	SKA Khabarovsk	23	(4)
1978	Sokol Saratov	23	(8)
1978–1979	Spartak Moscow	10	(1)
1979–1980	Sokol Saratov		(22)
1981–1983	Fakel Voronezh	81	(9)
1984–1988	Sokol Saratov	140	(32)

Managerial career
- 1988: Sokol Saratov (assistant)
- 1989–1990: Sokol Saratov (director)
- 1990–1996: Sokol-PZhD Saratov
- 1995: Sokol-PZhD Saratov (president)
- 1997–1998: Sokol Saratov (executive director)
- 1998–1999: Saturn Ramenskoye (assistant)
- 1999: Balakovo
- 2000–2002: Sokol Saratov
- 2002: Russia (assistant)
- 2002: Terek Grozny
- 2003: Sokol Saratov (director of sports)
- 2003–2005: Sokol Saratov
- 2006: Salyut-Energiya Belgorod
- 2007: Rotor Volgograd
- 2007: Rotor Volgograd (assistant)
- 2007–2008: SKA-Energiya Khabarovsk
- 2010–2011: Neman Grodno
- 2013–2014: Fakel Voronezh
- * Club domestic league appearances and goals

Alexander Ivanovich Koreshkov (Russian: Александр Иванович Корешков; born 23 July 1952) is a Russian professional football coach and a former player.

== Honours ==
- Soviet Top League champion: 1979.
