= Sergei Tashuyev =

Russian professional football coach (born 1959)

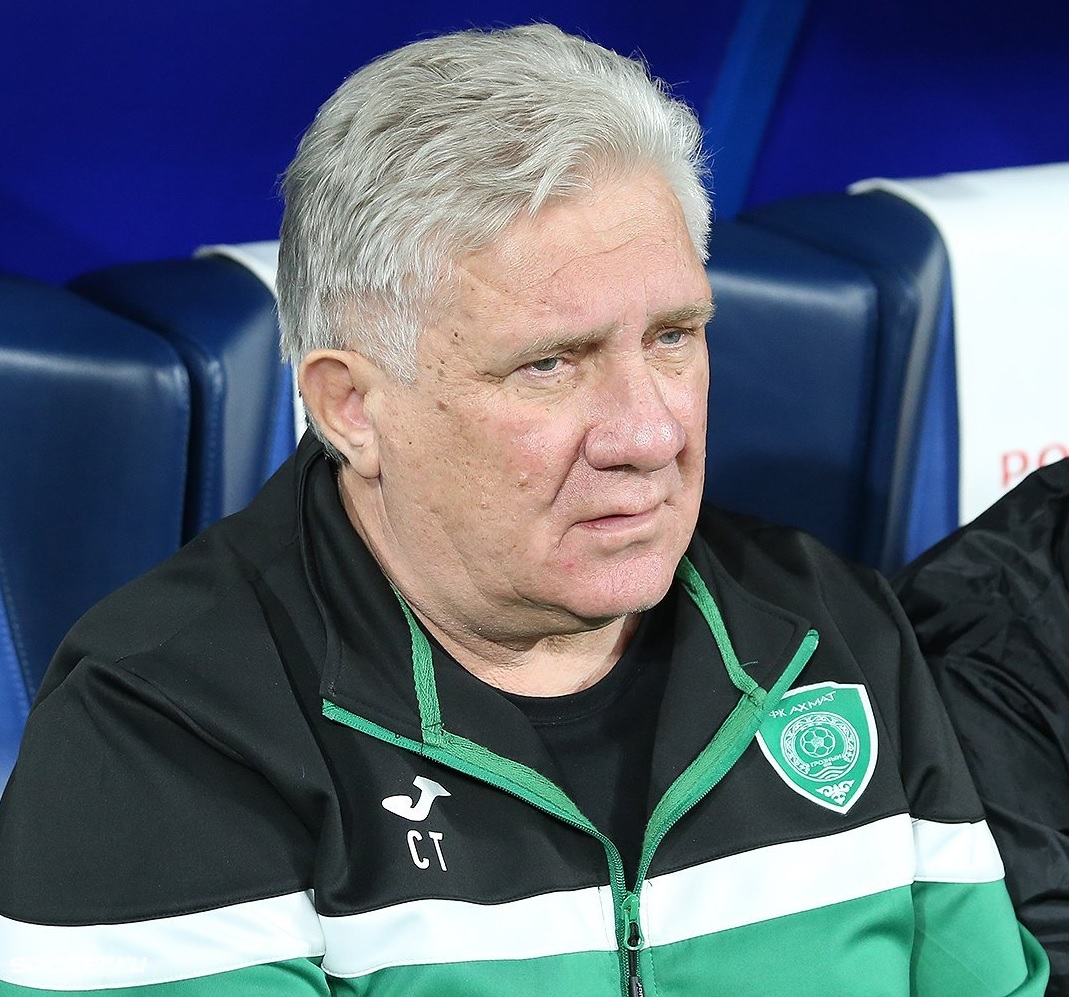
- Tashuyev coaching Akhmat Grozny in 2022

Personal information
- Full name: Sergei Abuyezidovich Tashuyev
- Date of birth: 1 January 1959 (age 67)
- Place of birth: Staryi Merchyk, Kharkiv Oblast, Ukrainian SSR

Managerial career
- Years: Team
- 1992–1993: Druzhba Budyonnovsk
- 1996–1997: Avtozapchast Baksan
- 1998: Fabus Bronnitsy
- 1999–2000: Krylia Sovetov Samara (assistant)
- 2001–2002: Fabus Bronnitsy
- 2003: Avtodor Vladikavkaz (consultant)
- 2004: Avtodor Vladikavkaz
- 2005: Saturn Ramenskoye (assistant)
- 2006: Terek Grozny (assistant)
- 2006: Zvezda Serpukhov
- 2007: Spartak-MZhK Ryazan
- 2007–2008: Lukhovitsy
- 2008–2009: Salyut-Energia Belgorod
- 2010: Krasnodar
- 2011–2012: Spartak Nalchik
- 2012–2013: Salyut Belgorod
- 2013–2014: Metalurh Donetsk
- 2014–2015: Anzhi Makhachkala
- 2015–2016: Kuban Krasnodar
- 2018–2019: Shakhtyor Soligorsk
- 2021: Chayka Peschanokopskoye (assistant)
- 2021–2022: Chayka Peschanokopskoye
- 2022: Shakhtyor Soligorsk
- 2022–2023: Akhmat Grozny
- 2023–2024: Fakel Voronezh
- 2024–2025: Akhmat Grozny
- 2025–2026: Yenisey Krasnoyarsk

Sergei Abuyezidovich Tashuyev (Russian: Сергей Абуезидович Ташуев; born 1 January 1959) is a Russian professional football coach. He grew up in Grozny before making the world of football his career.

== Coaching career ==
=== Early coaching career ===
Tashuyev began his coaching career in 1992 for a team from Budennovsk that played in the Second Division. He took a break from coaching between 1993 and 1996 after which he returned to lead another Second Division team from the Kabardino-Balkaria town of Baksan.

Sergei Tashuyev has coached at a number of teams in the Russian Second Division including Spartak-SWC, FC Luhovicy and Serpukhov and Vladikavkaz. Leading up to his appointment at FC Anzhi Makhachkal, Tashuyev held manager and coach positions at several First Division clubs in Russia. He was the head coach for Belgorod and FC Krasnodar. He won his first game as a Russian Premier League manager for PFC Spartak Nalchik on 26 June 2011. Immediately prior to joining FC Anzhi Makhachkala, Tashuyev was a manager of FC Metalurh Donetsk.

=== Anzhi Makhachkala ===
After a drastic budget cut, FC Anzhi Makhachkala suffered a number of significant player losses. After a difficult season, the club was relegated to the First Division, losing their Premier League status. Tashuyev was appointed as manager and head coach in May 2014, replacing Gadzhi Gadzhiyev.

=== Akhmat Grozny ===
On 22 September 2022, Tashuyev was hired as manager of Russian Premier League club Akhmat Grozny until the end of the 2022–23 season. Tashuyev led Akhmat to 5th place in the league. On 12 June 2023, his contract was extended until 2026. On 15 August 2023, Tashuyev left Akhmat by mutual consent as Akhmat started the 2023–24 Russian Premier League season with 4 losses in 5 games.

=== Fakel Voronezh ===
On 8 September 2023, Tashuyev was hired by Russian Premier League club Fakel Voronezh. On 6 April 2024, his contract with Fakel was extended. He resigned from Fakel on 26 April 2024 for family reasons.

=== Akhmat Grozny return ===
On 3 September 2024, Akhmat announced the return of Tashuyev as their head coach, on a two-year contract. He resigned on 28 May 2025, after Akhmat lost the first leg of the 2024–25 Russian Premier League relegation play-offs.

== Honours ==
Individual

- Russian Premier League coach of the month: October 2023.
