= FC Erzu Grozny =

- Full name: Football Club Erzu Grozny
- Founded: 1992; 34 years ago
- Dissolved: 1994; 32 years ago
- 1994: Russian First Division, 20th

FC Erzu Grozny (Russian: ФК «Эрзу» Грозный) was a Russian football team from Grozny. It was founded in 1992 and played professionally until 1994, including two seasons (1993–1994) in the second-highest-level Russian First Division. It was dissolved at the beginning of the First Chechen War.
