= 2011–12 Russian Football National League =

Russian National Football League
- Season: 2011–12
- Champions: Mordovia Saransk
- Promoted: Alania Vladikavkaz
- Matches: 495
- Goals: 1,134 (2.29 per match)
- Top goalscorer: Ruslan Mukhametshin 31 goals (Mordovia Saransk)
- Biggest home win: 5-0 Shinnik Yaroslavl v Dynamo Bryansk (010/11/2012)
- Biggest away win: 0-6 FK Khimki v Mordovia Saransk (04/06/2011)
- Highest scoring: 4-4 SKA-Energiya Khabarovsk v Mordovia Saransk; 2-6 Torpedo Moskva v Ural Sverdlovsk Oblast
- Longest unbeaten run: Alania Vladikavkaz 12 games (4 May 2011 to 27 June 2011 inclusive)

The 2011–12 Russian National Football League the 20th season of Russia's second-tier football league since the dissolution of the Soviet Union. The season began on 4 April.

== Overview ==
FC Zhemchuzhina-Sochi officially withdrew from the competition on 7 August 2011 due to lack of financing. Because they played more than half of their games, all their remaining opponents will be awarded a 3–0 victory.

Location of the teams participating in the 2011–12 season

Team	Location	Head Coach	Team Captain	Venue	Capacity	2010	Kit Maker
Alania	Vladikavkaz	(Russia) Vladimir Gazzayev	(Russia) Georgy Gabulov	Republican Spartak	32,464	PL 15th	Umbro
Baltika	Kaliningrad	(Russia) Yevgeni Perevertailo	(Russia) Yegor Kryshtafovich	Baltika	14,664	15th	Nike
Chernomorets	Novorossiysk	(Russia) Igor Cherniy	(Russia) Konstantin Belkov	Trud	12,500	D2 "South" 1st	Adidas
Dynamo Bryansk	Bryansk	(Russia) Valeriy Petrakov	(Russia) Aleksandr Fomichyov	Dynamo	10,100	14th	Umbro
Fakel	Voronezh	(Russia) Konstantin Sarsania	(Russia) Aleksandr Cherkes	Tsentralnyi Profsoyuz (Voronezh)	31,793	D2 "Center" 4th	Adidas
Gazovik	Orenburg	(Russia) Konstantin Galkin	(Russia) Sergei Dymov	Gazovik	4,950	D2 "Ural-Povolzhye" 1st	Nike
KAMAZ	Naberezhnye Chelny	(Russia) Robert Yevdokimov	—	KAMAZ	9,221	4th	Adidas
Khimki	Khimki	(Russia) Oleg Dolmatov	(Russia) Sergei Miroshnichenko	Novye Khimki	5,083	13th	Nike
Luch-Energiya	Vladivostok	(Russia) Sergei Pavlov	(Russia) Aleksandr Tikhonovetsky	Dynamo	10,185	12th	Puma
Mordovia	Saransk	(Russia) Fyodor Shcherbachenko	(Russia) Aleksei Muldarov	Start	7,400	6th	Adidas
Nizhny Novgorod	Nizhny Novgorod	(Russia) Vladimir Kazakov	(Russia) Dmitri Kudryashov	Severny	3,180	3rd	Adidas
Sibir	Novosibirsk	(Russia) Dmitri Radyukin	(North Macedonia) Veliče Šumulikoski	Spartak	12,500	PL 16th	Erreà
Shinnik	Yaroslavl	(Russia) Yuri Gazzaev	(Russia) Roman Voydel	Shinnik	22,990	10th	Puma
SKA-Energiya	Khabarovsk	(Russia) Aleksandr Grigoryan	(Ukraine) Vyacheslav Zapoyaska	Lenin Stadium	15,200	11th	Erreà
Torpedo	Moscow	(Russia) Igor Chugainov	(Russia) Andrei Konovalov	Eduard Streltsov	13,400	D2 "Center" 1st	Umbro
Torpedo	Vladimir	(Russia) Yevgeni Durnev	(Russia) Ivan Karatygin	Torpedo	26,000	D2 "West" 1st	Adidas
Ural	Yekaterinburg	(Russia) Yuri Matveyev	(Russia) Sergei Rashevsky	Uralmash	13,000	7th	Adidas
Volgar-Gazprom	Astrakhan	(Russia) Khazret Dyshekov	(Russia) Maksim Volkov	Central	18,500	9th	Adidas
Yenisey	Krasnoyarsk	(Russia) Aleksandr Alfyorov	(Russia) Sergei Pyatikopov	Central	22,500	D2 "East" 1st	Adidas
Zhemchuzhina	Sochi	(Russia) Stanislav Cherchesov	(Russia) Maksim Demenko	Central	10,280	8th	Adidas

=== Managerial changes ===
Team	Outgoing	Manner	Date	Table	Incoming	Date	Table
Luch-Energiya	(Spain) Francisco Arcos	Sacked	6 May 2011	19th	(Russia) Sergei Pavlov	7 May 2011	19th
Volgar-Gazprom	(Russia) Lev Ivanov	Sacked	7 May 2011	17th	(Russia) Aleksandr Krotov	7 May 2011	19th
Sibir	(Belarus) Igor Kriushenko	Resigned	9 May 2011	10th	(Russia) Dmitri Radyukin	9 May 2011	10th
Dynamo	(Russia) Aleksandr Smirnov	Sacked	20 May 2011	18th	(Russia) Oleg Garin (caretaker)	20 May 2011	19th
Dynamo	(Russia) Oleg Garin (caretaker)	Caretaking spell over	26 May 2011	18th	(Russia) Valeriy Petrakov	26 May 2011	18th
Ural	(Kazakhstan) Dmitriy Ogai	Sacked	30 May 2011	10th	(Russia) Yuri Matveyev (caretaker)	26 May 2011	10th
Shinnik	(Russia) Aleksandr Pobegalov	Sacked	6 June 2011	11th	(Russia) Galimdzhan Khayrulin (caretaker)	6 June 2011	11th
Shinnik	(Russia) Galimdzhan Khayrulin (caretaker)	Caretaking spell over	21 June 2011	11th	(Russia) Yuri Gazzaev	21 June 2011	11th
Baltika	(Russia) Sergey Frantsev	Resigned	28 June 2011	18th	(Russia) Aleksandr Gorbachyov (caretaker)	28 June 2011	18th
Khimki	(Russia) Aleksandr Grigoryan	Resigned	4 July 2011	15th	(Russia) Oleg Dolmatov	5 July 2011	15th
Baltika	(Russia) Aleksandr Gorbachyov (caretaker)	Caretaking spell over	20 July 2011	18th	(Russia) Yevgeni Perevertailo	20 July 2011	18th
Chernomorets	(Russia) Khazret Dyshekov	Resigned	4 September 2011	14th	(Russia) Igor Cherniy	4 September 2011	14th
Volgar-Gazprom	(Russia) Aleksandr Krotov	Sacked	7 September 2011	18th	(Russia) Khazret Dyshekov	7 September 2011	18th
SKA-Energiya	(Russia) Igor Protasov	Sacked	11 October 2011	11th	(Russia) Aleksandr Grigoryan	11 October 2011	11th

== First phase ==
=== Standings ===
Pos	Team	Pld	W	D	L	GF	GA	GD	Pts	Promotion or relegation
1	Alania Vladikavkaz	38	21	10	7	50	24	+26	73 (Note: Head-to-head record: Alania – Mordovia 4–0, Mordovia – Alania 1–2.)	Qualification for Championship group
2	Mordovia Saransk	38	21	10	7	64	44	+20	73	Qualification for Championship group
3	Shinnik Yaroslavl	38	21	6	11	61	42	+19	69	Qualification for Championship group
4	Nizhny Novgorod	38	21	5	12	53	40	+13	68	Qualification for Championship group
5	Sibir Novosibirsk	38	16	13	9	61	39	+22	61	Qualification for Championship group
6	Dynamo Bryansk	38	17	9	12	48	40	+8	60	Qualification for Championship group
7	Torpedo Moscow	38	16	12	10	50	30	+20	60	Qualification for Championship group
8	Ural Sverdlovsk Oblast	38	15	15	8	51	35	+16	60	Qualification for Championship group
9	KAMAZ Naberezhnye Chelny	38	17	8	13	48	36	+12	59	Qualification for Relegation group
10	Yenisey Krasnoyarsk	38	14	11	13	45	43	+2	53	Qualification for Relegation group
11	Khimki	38	13	9	16	47	61	−14	48	Qualification for Relegation group
12	Volgar-Gazprom Astrakhan	38	12	11	15	36	49	−13	47 (Note: Head-to-head record: Volgar-Gazprom – SKA 2–0, SKA – Volgar-Gazprom 1–1.)	Qualification for Relegation group
13	SKA-Khabarovsk	38	12	11	15	46	57	−11	47	Qualification for Relegation group
14	Torpedo Vladimir	38	12	7	19	45	61	−16	43	Qualification for Relegation group
15	Luch-Energiya Vladivostok	38	9	15	14	30	32	−2	42	Qualification for Relegation group
16	Chernomorets Novorossiysk	38	11	8	19	32	36	−4	41	Qualification for Relegation group
17	Baltika Kaliningrad	38	9	14	15	31	45	−14	41	Qualification for Relegation group
18	Gazovik Orenburg	38	8	14	16	40	48	−8	38	Qualification for Relegation group
19	Fakel Voronezh	38	6	12	20	26	46	−20	30	Qualification for Relegation group
20	Zhemchuzhina-Sochi (R)	38	8	2	28	22	81	−59	26	Excluded from professional football (Note: FC Zhemchuzhina-Sochi excluded from professional football for financial reasons.)

Source: FNL, Soccerway
Rules for classification: 1st points; 2nd matches won; 3rd head-to-head (points, matches won, goal difference, goals scored, away goals scored); 4th goal difference; 5th goals scored; 6th away goals scored
(R) Relegated

=== Results ===
Home \ Away	ALA	BAL	CHM	DBR	FAK	GAZ	KAM	KHI	LUE	MOR	NN	SHI	SIB	SKA	TOR	TOV	URA	VGA	YEN	ZHE
Alania Vladikavkaz		2–0	1–1	2–1	1–0	0–0	2–0	1–1	1–0	4–0	1–0	0–1	1–1	3–1	1–3	1–0	1–0	2–0	4–0	3–0
Baltika Kaliningrad	0–2		1–0	0–0	0–0	0–0	0–1	4–1	2–0	0–0	0–2	0–1	0–1	0–1	0–3	1–3	2–2	1–0	2–1	0–0
Chernomorets Novorossiysk	0–1	1–2		2–1	1–0	2–0	1–0	1–1	0–2	0–1	0–1	2–3	1–1	2–1	0–0	0–0	1–0	3–0	1–1	0–1
Dynamo Bryansk	1–0	2–0	1–0		0–1	1–1	1–0	4–2	1–1	4–1	3–2	0–1	1–1	0–2	0–3	0–2	0–0	0–0	2–1	3–0
Fakel Voronezh	1–1	2–3	1–0	0–1		1–1	1–0	0–1	1–3	0–0	0–0	1–2	0–3	2–2	0–0	2–1	0–0	0–1	1–2	3–0
Gazovik Orenburg	1–0	1–1	2–1	0–0	2–1		0–0	1–2	0–0	1–1	0–2	1–2	2–1	2–3	1–1	1–1	0–1	1–3	3–4	0–2
KAMAZ Naberezhnye Chelny	2–0	0–0	3–1	1–0	3–1	1–3		1–1	2–0	1–2	0–2	1–2	1–1	0–0	3–2	3–0	0–1	1–0	2–0	1–0
Khimki	0–2	1–1	2–1	0–0	2–0	2–1	0–3		1–0	0–6	1–2	2–0	1–3	2–1	2–2	3–1	3–1	1–1	1–0	3–0
Luch-Energiya Vladivostok	0–1	0–0	1–0	0–2	0–0	2–1	0–1	0–0		0–0	0–0	2–1	1–0	2–0	0–2	0–1	1–1	0–1	0–0	0–1
Mordovia Saransk	1–2	3–1	2–1	3–2	3–2	3–1	1–0	2–1	1–1		3–1	0–0	1–0	2–1	2–0	4–0	4–2	3–4	2–3	2–1
Nizhny Novgorod	0–3	1–0	1–0	0–1	3–1	2–1	1–2	2–0	4–1	1–1		3–2	2–1	2–0	1–0	2–0	1–5	2–1	0–1	3–0
Shinnik Yaroslavl	2–2	0–3	1–0	5–0	1–0	2–1	3–2	4–1	0–0	0–1	4–1		3–3	1–2	0–4	2–0	1–2	3–0	2–0	3–0
Sibir Novosibirsk	3–0	3–0	0–0	4–1	1–2	1–0	1–1	2–1	2–2	2–1	1–1	1–0		2–2	2–0	2–1	0–0	5–1	0–1	2–1
SKA-Khabarovsk	1–1	1–1	1–0	0–2	1–0	2–1	1–1	1–0	0–5	4–4	1–1	0–0	1–2		0–1	2–0	1–1	1–1	4–3	3–1
Torpedo Moscow	0–0	4–0	0–1	1–0	2–0	1–1	2–0	3–1	1–0	1–1	0–1	1–0	1–1	2–1		1–1	0–1	0–0	1–2	2–1
Torpedo Vladimir	0–3	1–1	0–2	1–3	1–0	0–0	3–2	3–3	1–1	1–2	1–3	1–2	3–2	3–1	3–1		1–0	2–0	0–2	3–0
Ural Sverdlovsk Oblast	0–0	3–0	1–0	0–0	1–1	1–1	2–3	5–2	1–1	0–0	2–0	0–2	3–2	2–0	2–1	3–2		0–0	0–0	1–3
Volgar-Gazprom Astrakhan	3–0	2–2	2–2	1–5	2–0	1–3	0–2	1–0	0–0	0–1	0–3	1–1	1–0	2–0	0–0	3–1	0–3		1–0	3–0
Yenisey Krasnoyarsk	0–0	0–0	0–1	0–1	1–1	0–2	1–1	0–2	2–1	2–0	2–0	2–1	1–1	3–0	1–1	1–2	1–1	0–0		4–2
Zhemchuzhina-Sochi	0–1	0–3	0–3	2–4	0–0	0–3	0–3	1–0	0–3	0–3	1–0	2–3	0–3	0–3	0–3	2–1	0–3	1–0	0–3	

Source: Soccerway
Legend: Blue = home team win; Yellow = draw; Red = away team win.

== Second phase ==
=== Promotion Group ===
==== Standings ====
Pos	Team	Pld	W	D	L	GF	GA	GD	Pts	Promotion or relegation
1	Mordovia Saransk (C, P)	52	29	13	10	91	56	+35	100	Promotion to Premier League
2	Alania Vladikavkaz (P)	52	28	13	11	66	39	+27	97	Promotion to Premier League
3	Nizhny Novgorod (Note: FC Nizhny Novgorod excluded from professional football for financial reasons.) (R)	52	29	7	16	76	58	+18	94	Qualification for promotion play-offs
4	Shinnik Yaroslavl	52	25	10	17	70	56	+14	85	Qualification for promotion play-offs
5	Dynamo Bryansk (Note: FC Dynamo Bryansk excluded from professional football for financial reasons.) (R)	52	22	12	18	62	57	+5	78	Excluded from professional football
6	Ural Sverdlovsk Oblast	52	19	21	12	71	52	+19	78	
7	Sibir Novosibirsk	52	19	19	14	76	57	+19	76	
8	Torpedo Moscow	52	17	17	18	63	53	+10	68	

Source: FNL, Soccerway
Rules for classification: 1st points; 2nd matches won; 3rd head-to-head (points, matches won, goal difference, goals scored, away goals scored); 4th goal difference; 5th goals scored; 6th away goals scored
(C) Champions; (P) Promoted; (R) Relegated

==== Results ====
Home \ Away	ALA	DBR	MOR	NN	SHI	SIB	TOR	URA
Alania Vladikavkaz		2–0	2–4	1–0	0–0	1–1	1–0	1–2
Dynamo Bryansk	1–2		1–0	1–2	0–1	1–0	1–1	2–1
Mordovia Saransk	2–0	3–1		3–1	2–0	0–2	2–0	2–2
Nizhny Novgorod	2–0	3–1	0–2		1–0	4–3	3–2	1–1
Shinnik Yaroslavl	0–1	0–2	0–2	1–1		1–2	1–0	2–1
Sibir Novosibirsk	1–2	0–0	2–1	0–3	1–1		1–1	0–1
Torpedo Moscow	0–1	2–3	0–0	3–0	1–1	1–1		2–6
Ural Sverdlovsk Oblast	2–2	0–0	1–1	0–2	0–1	1–1	2–0	

Source: Soccerway
Legend: Blue = home team win; Yellow = draw; Red = away team win.

=== Relegation Group ===
==== Standings ====
Pos	Team	Pld	W	D	L	GF	GA	GD	Pts	Promotion or relegation
1	KAMAZ Naberezhnye Chelny (Note: FC KAMAZ Naberezhnye Chelny relegated to Second Division for financial reasons.) (R)	48	19	10	19	53	46	+7	67	Relegation to Second Division
2	Yenisey Krasnoyarsk	48	17	15	16	53	53	0	66	
3	SKA-Khabarovsk	48	16	14	18	57	66	−9	62	
4	Torpedo Vladimir (Note: FC Torpedo Vladimir excluded from professional football for financial reasons.) (R)	48	17	10	21	62	73	−11	61	Excluded from professional football
5	Khimki	48	16	11	21	54	74	−20	59	
6	Volgar-Gazprom Astrakhan	48	15	14	19	44	57	−13	59	
7	Baltika Kaliningrad	48	14	17	17	42	54	−12	59 (Note: Head-to-head record: Gazovik – Baltika 1–1, Baltika – Gazovik 0–0, Baltika – Gazovik 2–1.)	
8	Gazovik Orenburg (R)	48	14	17	17	54	52	+2	59	Relegation to Second Division
9	Luch-Energiya Vladivostok (R)	48	11	21	16	37	39	−2	54	Relegation to Second Division
10	Chernomorets Novorossiysk (R)	48	14	10	24	40	45	−5	52	Relegation to Second Division
11	Fakel Voronezh (R)	48	9	13	26	34	59	−25	40	Relegation to Second Division

Source: FNL, Soccerway
Rules for classification: 1st points; 2nd matches won; 3rd head-to-head (points, matches won, goal difference, goals scored, away goals scored); 4th goal difference; 5th goals scored; 6th away goals scored
(R) Relegated

==== Results ====
Home \ Away	BAL	CHM	FAK	GAZ	KAM	KHI	LUE	SKA	TOV	VGA	YEN
Baltika Kaliningrad		1–0	2–0	2–1			1–1				0–1
Chernomorets Novorossiysk					1–0	1–0		1–2	3–0	0–0	
Fakel Voronezh		0–0		0–2			0–1	2–1			1–0
Gazovik Orenburg		2–0			2–0	3–0		1–0		1–0	
KAMAZ Naberezhnye Chelny	0–1		2–0				0–0		0–1		2–1
Khimki	1–1		1–3		1–0				0–2		0–0
Luch-Energiya Vladivostok		2–1		0–0		1–2		1–2		0–0	
SKA-Khabarovsk	0–0				2–0	2–1			1–1	0–1	
Torpedo Vladimir	5–2		2–1	1–1			1–1				3–0
Volgar-Gazprom Astrakhan	0–1		2–1		1–1	0–1			3–1		
Yenisey Krasnoyarsk		2–1		1–1			0–0	1–1		2–1	

Source: Soccerway
Legend: Blue = home team win; Yellow = draw; Red = away team win.

== Top scorers ==
Source: Onedivision.ru (in Russian)

Rank	Player	Team	Goals
1	(Russia) Ruslan Mukhametshin	Mordovia	31
2	(Russia) Dmitri Golubov	Baltika / Dynamo	22
3	(Russia) Dmitri Akimov	Sibir	20
3	(Russia) Maksim Astafyev	Sibir	16
4	(Russia) Kirill Panchenko	Mordovia	15
5	(Russia) Artyom Delkin	Torpedo Vladimir	14
5	(Russia) Eldar Nizamutdinov	Shinnik	14

== See also ==
- 2011–12 Russian Premier League
