= FC Chernomorets Novorossiysk in European football =

FC Chernomorets Novorossiysk (Russian: ФК "Черноморец" Новороссийск) is the oldest Russian association football club based in Novorossiysk.

== UEFA Cup 2001–02 ==
Managers: Sergey Andreyev (first leg), Khazret Dyshekov (second leg).

=== First round ===
- September 19, 2001 / FC Chernomorets Novorossiysk (Russia) - Valencia CF (Spain) 0–1 (Mista 56') / Central Stadium, Novorossiysk / Attendance: 10,000

FC Chernomorets: Gerus, Kyryukhin (Surodin, 90+3), Bezhenar, Mayorov, Oleinik, Svystunov, Alyakrinsky, Yershov (Oreshchuk, 61), Pavlus (Osipov, 82), Shevchenko, Zuyev.
Valencia CF: Cañizares, Pellegrino, Đukić, Marchena (Navarro, 90+1), Carboni, Sánchez Moreno, Kily González (Vicente Rodríguez, 68), Rufete, de los Santos, Curro Torres, Mista (Carew, 76).

- September 27, 2001 / Valencia CF - FC Chernomorets Novorossiysk 5–0 (Sánchez Moreno 7' 23' Ilie 18' Salva 51' Rufete 69') / Estadio Mestalla, Valencia / Attendance: 27,000

Valencia CF: Cañizares, Ayala, Đukić, Ilie, Marchena, Carboni (Angulo, 46), Sánchez Moreno, Kily González, Rufete, Curro Torres (Albelda, 72), Mista (Salva, 31).
FC Chernomorets: Gerus, Bezhenar, Mayorov (Belkov, 60), Oleinik (Oreshchuk, 46), Svystunov, Alyakrinsky, Yershov, Pavlus, Shevchenko (Tlisov, 81), Osipov, Tchami.
