= March 27 =

March 27 this year in various calendars
- Friday, 27 March 2026
Akan	Kurufie
Armenian	10 Ahekani 1475
Aztec	Huei Tecuilhuitl 16, 12 Cuetzpalin
Babylonian	7 Adaru, 2336 SE
Balinese pawukon	Luang, Pepet, Pasah, Menala, Pon, Paniron, Sukra of Dukut, Uma, Dangu, Duka
Bengali	13 Chaitro, BS 1432
Chinese	Yang Metal Rat・Ghost Mansion; Fire Horse Year, Month 2, Day 9 (Chunfen, 9 days until Qingming)
Common Era	27 March 2026 CE
Coptic	18 Paremhat, AM 1742
Egyptian	15 Mesori, 2774 NE
Ethiopian	18 Magābit, 2018 Amätä Məhrät
French Republican	Décade I, Septidi de Germinal de l'Année 234 de la République
Gregorian	27 March, AD 2026
Hebrew	9 Nisan, AM 5786
Hindu	Punarvasu・Śobhana; Solar: 14 Caitra, 1947 SE; Lunisolar: Navamī, Śukla pakṣa of Caitra, 2083 VE; Rāudra・5126 KY・1,872,661
Icelandic	Föstudagur, 4 Einmánuður 2025
Islamic	8 Shawwal, AH 1447 (using tabular method)
ISO week date	2026-W13-5
Japanese	9 Kisaragi, Reiwa 8 (Shunbun, 9 days until Seimei)
Julian	14 March, AD 2026 (AM 7534)
Julian day	2461127
Korean	9 Tokkidal, 4359 DE
Maya	13.0.13.8.4; 2 Uayeb, 12 Kan
Roman	Pridie Idus Martias, MMDCCLXXIX AUC
Solar Hijri	7 Farvardin, SH 1405
Tibetan	9 dbo, me pho rta 2153 or 1772 or 1000

<<	March					>>
Su	Mo	Tu	We	Th	Fr	Sa
1	2	3	4	5	6	7
8	9	10	11	12	13	14
15	16	17	18	19	20	21
22	23	24	25	26	27	28
29	30	31
2026

March 27 in recent years
2026 (Friday)
2025 (Thursday)
2024 (Wednesday)
2023 (Monday)
2022 (Sunday)
2021 (Saturday)
2020 (Friday)
2019 (Wednesday)
2018 (Tuesday)
2017 (Monday)

March 27 is the 86th day of the year (87th in leap years) in the Gregorian calendar; 279 days remain until the end of the year.

== Events ==
=== Pre-1600 ===
- 1309 – Pope Clement V imposes excommunication and interdiction on Venice, and a general prohibition of all commercial intercourse with Venice, which had seized Ferrara, a papal fiefdom.
- 1329 – Pope John XXII issues his In Agro Dominico condemning some writings of Meister Eckhart as heretical.
- 1513 – Spanish explorer Juan Ponce de León reaches the northern end of The Bahamas on his first voyage to Florida.

=== 1601–1900 ===
- 1625 – Charles I becomes King of England, Scotland and Ireland as well as claiming the title King of France.
- 1638 – The first of four destructive Calabrian earthquakes strikes southern Italy. Measuring magnitude 6.8 and assigned a Mercalli intensity of XI, it kills 10,000–30,000 people.
- 1782 – The Second Rockingham ministry assumes office in Great Britain and begins negotiations to end the American War of Independence.
- 1794 – The United States Government establishes a permanent navy and authorizes the building of six frigates.
- 1809 – Peninsular War: A combined Franco-Polish force defeats the Spanish in the Battle of Ciudad Real.
- 1814 – War of 1812: In central Alabama, U.S. forces under General Andrew Jackson defeat the Creek at the Battle of Horseshoe Bend.
- 1836 – Texas Revolution: On the orders of General Antonio López de Santa Anna, the Mexican Army massacres 342 Texian Army POWs at Goliad, Texas.
- 1866 – President of the United States of America Andrew Johnson vetoes the Civil Rights Act of 1866. His veto is overridden by Congress and the bill passes into law on April 9.
- 1871 – The first international rugby football match, when Scotland defeats England in Edinburgh at Raeburn Place.
- 1884 – A mob in Cincinnati, Ohio, United States attacks members of a jury which had returned a verdict of manslaughter in what was seen as a clear case of murder; over the next few days the mob would riot and burn down the courthouse.
- 1886 – Geronimo, Apache warrior, surrenders to the U.S. Army, ending the main phase of the Apache Wars.
- 1899 – Emilio Aguinaldo leads Filipino forces for the only time during the Philippine–American War at the Battle of Marilao River.

=== 1901–present ===
- 1901 – Philippine–American War: Emilio Aguinaldo, leader of the First Philippine Republic, is captured by the Americans.
- 1912 – First Lady Helen Taft and the Viscountess Chinda, wife of the Japanese ambassador, plant two Yoshino cherry trees on the northern bank of the Potomac River in Washington, D.C., the origin of the National Cherry Blossom Festival.
- 1915 – Typhoid Mary, the first healthy carrier of disease ever identified in the United States, is put in quarantine for the second time, where she would remain for the rest of her life.
- 1918 – The National Council of Bessarabia proclaims union with the Kingdom of Romania.
- 1933 – Japanese invasion of Manchuria: Japan leaves the League of Nations after it approves the Lytton Report that ruled in favour of China.
- 1938 – Second Sino-Japanese War: The Battle of Taierzhuang begins, resulting several weeks later in the war's first major Chinese victory over Japan.
- 1941 – World War II: Yugoslav Air Force officers topple the pro-Axis government in a bloodless coup.
- 1942 – The Holocaust: Nazi Germany and Vichy France begin the deportation of 65,000 Jews from Drancy internment camp to German extermination camps.
- 1943 – World War II: Battle of the Komandorski Islands: In the Aleutian Islands the battle begins when United States Navy forces intercept Japanese attempting to reinforce a garrison at Kiska.
- 1945 – World War II: Operation Starvation, the aerial mining of Japan's ports and waterways begins. Argentina declares war on the Axis Powers.
- 1958 – Nikita Khrushchev becomes Chairman of the Council of Ministers of the Soviet Union.
- 1964 – The Good Friday earthquake, the most powerful earthquake recorded in North American history at a magnitude of 9.2 strikes Southcentral Alaska, killing 125 people and inflicting massive damage to the city of Anchorage.
- 1975 – Construction of the Trans-Alaska Pipeline System begins.
- 1976 – The first section of the Washington Metro opens to the public.
- 1977 – Tenerife airport disaster: Two Boeing 747 airliners collide on a foggy runway on Tenerife in the Canary Islands, killing 583 (all 248 on KLM and 335 on Pan Am). Sixty-one survived on the Pan Am flight. This is the deadliest aviation accident in history.
- 1980 – The Norwegian oil platform Alexander L. Kielland collapses in the North Sea, killing 123 of its crew of 212.
- 1981 – The Solidarity movement in Poland stages a warning strike, in which at least 12 million Poles walk off their jobs for four hours.
- 1986 – A car bomb explodes outside Russell Street Police HQ in Melbourne, Australia, killing one police officer and injuring 21 people.
- 1990 – The United States begins broadcasting anti-Castro propaganda to Cuba on TV Martí.
- 1993 – Jiang Zemin is appointed President of China.
- 1993 – Italian former minister and Christian Democracy leader Giulio Andreotti is accused of mafia allegiance by the tribunal of Palermo.
- 1998 – The Food and Drug Administration approves Viagra for use as a treatment for erectile dysfunction, the first pill to be approved for this condition in the United States.
- 1999 – Kosovo War: An American Lockheed F-117A Nighthawk is shot down by a Yugoslav Army SAM, the first and only Nighthawk to be lost in combat.
- 2000 – A Phillips Petroleum plant explosion in Pasadena, Texas kills one person and injures 71 others.
- 2002 – Passover massacre: A Palestinian suicide bomber kills 29 people at a Passover seder in Netanya, Israel.
- 2002 – Nanterre massacre: In Nanterre, France, a gunman opens fire at the end of a town council meeting, resulting in the deaths of eight councilors; 19 other people are injured.
- 2004 – HMS Scylla, a decommissioned Leander-class frigate, is sunk as an artificial reef off Cornwall, the first of its kind in Europe.
- 2009 – The dam forming Situ Gintung, an artificial lake in Indonesia, fails, killing at least 99 people.
- 2014 – Philippines signs a peace accord with the largest Muslim rebel group, the Moro Islamic Liberation Front, ending decades of conflict.
- 2015 – Al-Shabab militants attack and temporarily occupy a Mogadishu hotel leaving at least 20 people dead.
- 2016 – A suicide blast in Gulshan-e-Iqbal Park, Lahore claims over 70 lives and leaves almost 300 others injured. The target of the bombing are Christians celebrating Easter.
- 2020 – North Macedonia becomes the 30th member of NATO.
- 2023 – Seven people, including the perpetrator, are killed in a mass shooting at the Covenant School in Nashville, Tennessee.
- 2023 – Forty people are killed in a fire at a migrant detention facility in Ciudad Juárez, Mexico.

== Births ==
=== Pre-1600 ===
- 1401 – Albert III, duke of Bavaria (died 1460)
- 1416 – Francis of Paola, Italian friar and saint, founded Order of the Minims (died 1507)
- 1509 – Wolrad II, Count of Waldeck-Eisenberg, German nobleman (died 1578)
- 1546 – Johannes Piscator, German theologian (died 1625)

=== 1601–1900 ===
- 1627 – Stephen Fox, English politician (died 1716)
- 1676 – Francis II Rákóczi, Hungarian prince (died 1735)
- 1679 – Domenico Lalli, Italian poet and librettist (died 1741)
- 1681 – Joaquín Fernández de Portocarrero, Spanish-Italian cardinal (died 1760)
- 1702 – Johann Ernst Eberlin, German organist and composer (died 1762)
- 1710 – Joseph Abaco, Belgian cellist and composer (died 1805)
- 1712 – Claude Bourgelat, French surgeon and author (died 1779)
- 1714 – Francesco Antonio Zaccaria, Italian historian and theologian (died 1795)
- 1724 – Jane Colden, American botanist and author (died 1766)
- 1746 – Michael Bruce, Scottish poet and composer (died 1767)
- 1746 – Carlo Buonaparte, Corsican-French lawyer and politician (died 1785)
- 1765 – Franz Xaver von Baader, German philosopher and theologian (died 1841)
- 1781 – Alexander Vostokov, Estonian-Russian philologist and academic (died 1864)
- 1784 – Sándor Kőrösi Csoma, Hungarian philologist, orientalist, and author (died 1842)
- 1785 – Louis XVII of France (died 1795)
- 1797 – Alfred de Vigny, French author, poet, and playwright (died 1863)
- 1801 – Alexander Barrow, American lawyer and politician (died 1846)
- 1802 – Charles-Mathias Simons, German-Luxembourger jurist and politician, 3rd Prime Minister of Luxembourg (died 1874)
- 1809 – Georges-Eugène Haussmann, French engineer, urban planner, and politician (died 1891)
- 1811 – Edward William Cooke, English painter and illustrator (died 1880)
- 1812 – William Robinson (Canadian architect), Canadian architect and land surveyor (died 1894)
- 1814 – Charles Mackay, Scottish journalist, anthologist, and author (died 1889)
- 1820 – Edward Augustus Inglefield, English admiral and explorer (died 1894)
- 1822 – Henri Murger, French novelist and poet (died 1861)
- 1824 – Virginia Minor, American women's suffrage activist (died 1894)
- 1839 – John Ballance, Irish-New Zealand journalist and politician, 14th Prime Minister of New Zealand (died 1893)
- 1843 – George Frederick Leycester Marshall, English colonel and entomologist (died 1934)
- 1844 – Adolphus Greely, American general and explorer, Medal of Honor recipient (died 1935)
- 1845 – Wilhelm Röntgen, German physicist and academic, Nobel Prize laureate (died 1923)
- 1845 – Jakob Sverdrup, Norwegian bishop and politician, Norwegian Minister of Education and Church Affairs (died 1899)
- 1847 – Otto Wallach, German chemist and academic, Nobel Prize laureate (died 1931)
- 1851 – Ruperto Chapí, Spanish composer, co-founded Sociedad General de Autores y Editores (died 1909)
- 1851 – Vincent d'Indy, French composer and educator (died 1931)
- 1852 – Jan van Beers, Belgian painter and illustrator (died 1927)
- 1854 – Giovanni Battista Grassi, Italian physician, zoologist, and entomologist (died 1925)
- 1855 – William Libbey, American target shooter, colonel, mountaineer, geographer, geologist, and archaeologist (died 1927)
- 1857 – Karl Pearson, English mathematician, eugenicist, and academic (died 1936)
- 1859 – George Giffen, Australian cricketer and footballer (died 1927)
- 1860 – Frank Frost Abbott, American-Swiss scholar and academic (died 1924)
- 1862 – Jelena Dimitrijević, Serbian short story writer, novelist, poet, traveller, social worker, feminist and polyglot (died 1945)
- 1862 – Arturo Berutti, Argentinian composer (died 1938)
- 1863 – Henry Royce, English engineer and businessman, founded Rolls-Royce Limited (died 1933)
- 1866 – John Allan, Australian politician, 29th Premier of Victoria (died 1936)
- 1868 – Patty Hill, American songwriter and educator (died 1946)
- 1869 – James McNeill, Irish politician, 2nd Governor-General of the Irish Free State (died 1938)
- 1869 – J. R. Clynes, English trade unionist and politician, Home Secretary (died 1949)
- 1871 – Heinrich Mann, German author and poet (died 1950)
- 1871 – Joseph G. Morrison, American captain and Nazarene minister (died 1939)
- 1871 – Piet Aalberse, Dutch politician, Minister of Labour (died 1948)
- 1875 – Albert Marquet, French painter (died 1947)
- 1877 – Oscar Grégoire, Belgian water polo player and swimmer (died 1947)
- 1878 – Kathleen Scott, British sculptor (died 1947)
- 1879 – Sándor Garbai, Hungarian politician, 19th Prime Minister of Hungary (died 1947)
- 1879 – Miller Huggins, American baseball player and manager (died 1929)
- 1879 – Edward Steichen, Luxembourger-American painter and photographer (died 1973)
- 1881 – Arkady Averchenko, Russian playwright and satirist (died 1925)
- 1882 – Thomas Graham Brown, Scottish mountaineer and physiologist (died 1965)
- 1883 – Marie Under, Estonian author and poet (died 1980)
- 1884 – Gordon Thomson, English rower and lieutenant (died 1953)
- 1885 – Julio Lozano Díaz, Honduran accountant and politician, 40th President of Honduras (died 1957)
- 1885 – Reginald Fletcher, 1st Baron Winster, English navy officer and politician, Secretary of State for Transport (died 1961)
- 1886 – Sergey Kirov, Russian politician (died 1934)
- 1886 – Wladimir Burliuk, Ukrainian painter and illustrator (died 1917)
- 1886 – Ludwig Mies van der Rohe, German-American architect, designed IBM Plaza and Seagram Building (died 1969)
- 1887 – Väinö Siikaniemi, Finnish javelin thrower, poet, and translator (died 1932)
- 1888 – George Alfred Lawrence Hearne, English-South African cricketer (died 1978)
- 1889 – Yakup Kadri Karaosmanoğlu, Egyptian-Turkish journalist, author, and politician (died 1974)
- 1889 – Leonard Mociulschi, Romanian general (died 1979)
- 1890 – Harald Julin, Swedish swimmer and water polo player (died 1967)
- 1890 – Frederick Dalrymple-Hamilton, Scottish admiral (died 1974)
- 1891 – Lajos Zilahy, Hungarian novelist and playwright (died 1974)
- 1891 – Klawdziy Duzh-Dushewski, Belarusian-Lithuanian architect, journalist, and diplomat, created the Flag of Belarus (died 1959)
- 1892 – Ferde Grofé, American pianist and composer (died 1972)
- 1892 – Thorne Smith, American author (died 1934)
- 1893 – Karl Mannheim, Hungarian-English sociologist and academic (died 1947)
- 1893 – G. Lloyd Spencer, American lieutenant and politician (died 1981)
- 1893 – George Beranger, Australian-American actor and director (died 1973)
- 1894 – René Fonck, French colonel and pilot (died 1953)
- 1895 – Roland Leighton, English soldier and poet (died 1915)
- 1897 – Douglas Hartree, English mathematician and physicist (died 1958)
- 1897 – Fred Keating, American magician, stage and film actor (died 1961)
- 1899 – Francis Ponge, French poet and author (died 1988)
- 1899 – Herbert Arthur Stuart, German-Swiss physicist and academic (died 1974)
- 1899 – Gloria Swanson, American actress and producer (died 1983)

=== 1901–present ===
- 1901 – Carl Barks, American illustrator and screenwriter (died 2000)
- 1901 – Erich Ollenhauer, German politician (died 1963)
- 1901 – Eisaku Satō, Japanese politician, Prime Minister of Japan, Nobel Prize laureate (died 1975)
- 1901 – Kenneth Slessor, Australian journalist and poet (died 1971)
- 1902 – Sidney Buchman, American screenwriter and producer (died 1975)
- 1902 – Charles Lang, American cinematographer (died 1998)
- 1903 – Leif Tronstad, Norwegian chemist and military leader (died 1945)
- 1903 – Xavier Villaurrutia, Mexican poet and playwright (died 1950)
- 1905 – Leroy Carr, American singer-songwriter and pianist (died 1935)
- 1905 – Rudolf Christoph Freiherr von Gersdorff, German general (died 1980)
- 1905 – Elsie MacGill, Canadian-American author and engineer (died 1980)
- 1906 – Pee Wee Russell, American clarinet player, saxophonist, and composer (died 1969)
- 1909 – Golo Mann, German historian and author (died 1994)
- 1909 – Ben Webster, American saxophonist (died 1973)
- 1909 – Valery Marakou, Belarusian poet and translator (died 1937)
- 1910 – Ai Qing, Chinese poet and author (died 1996)
- 1911 – Veronika Tushnova, Russian poet and physician (died 1965)
- 1912 – James Callaghan, English lieutenant and politician, Prime Minister of the United Kingdom (died 2005)
- 1913 – Theodor Dannecker, German SS officer (died 1945)
- 1914 – Richard Denning, American actor (died 1998)
- 1914 – Budd Schulberg, American author, screenwriter, and producer (died 2009)
- 1915 – Robert Lockwood, Jr., American guitarist (died 2006)
- 1917 – Cyrus Vance, American lawyer and politician, 57th United States Secretary of State (died 2002)
- 1917 – Mary Watt, New Zealand landscape architect and gardener (died 2005)
- 1920 – Colin Rowe, English-American architect, theorist and academic (died 1999)
- 1921 – Phil Chess, Polish-American record producer, co-founded Chess Records (died 2016)
- 1921 – Moacir Barbosa Nascimento, Brazilian footballer and coach (died 2000)
- 1921 – Harold Nicholas, American actor and dancer (died 2000)
- 1922 – Dick King-Smith, English author (died 2011)
- 1922 – Stefan Wul, French author and surgeon (died 2003)
- 1922 – Jules Olitski, Ukrainian-American painter, printmaker, and sculptor (died 2007)
- 1923 – Shūsaku Endō, Japanese author (died 1996)
- 1923 – Louis Simpson, Jamaican-American poet, translator, and academic (died 2012)
- 1924 – Sarah Vaughan, American singer (died 1990)
- 1924 – Ian Black, Scottish international footballer and lawn bowls player (died 2012)
- 1924 – Margaret K. Butler, American mathematician and computer programmer (died 2013)
- 1926 – Frank O'Hara, American writer (died 1966)
- 1927 – Anthony Lewis, American journalist and academic (died 2013)
- 1927 – Mstislav Rostropovich, Russian cellist and conductor (died 2007)
- 1928 – Jean Dotto, French cyclist (died 2000)
- 1929 – Anne Ramsey, American actress (died 1988)
- 1929 – Reg Evans, Australian actor (died 2009)
- 1930 – Daniel Spoerri, Romanian-Swiss photographer, writer and artist (died 2024)
- 1931 – David Janssen, American actor and screenwriter (died 1980)
- 1932 – Junior Parker, American singer and harmonica player (died 1971)
- 1932 – Bailey Olter, Micronesian politician, 3rd President of the Federated States of Micronesia (died 1999)
- 1933 – Lê Văn Hưng, South Vietnamese Brigadier general (died 1975)
- 1934 – István Csurka, Hungarian journalist, author, and politician (died 2012)
- 1934 – Ioannis Palaiokrassas, Greek politician (died 2021)
- 1935 – Stanley Rother, American Roman Catholic priest and missionary (died 1981)
- 1935 – Julian Glover, English actor
- 1936 – Malcolm Goldstein, American violinist and composer
- 1937 – Alan Hawkshaw, English keyboard player and songwriter (died 2021)
- 1939 – Jay Kim, South Korean-American engineer and politician
- 1939 – Cale Yarborough, American race car driver and businessman (died 2023)
- 1940 – Sandro Munari, Italian race car driver (died 2026)
- 1940 – Austin Pendleton, American actor, director, and playwright
- 1941 – Ivan Gašparovič, Slovak lawyer and politician, 3rd President of Slovakia
- 1941 – Liese Prokop, Austrian pentathlete and politician, Austrian Minister of the Interior (died 2006)
- 1942 – Michael Jackson, English journalist and author (died 2007)
- 1942 – John Sulston, English biologist and academic, Nobel Prize laureate (died 2018)
- 1942 – Michael York, English actor
- 1943 – Mike Curtis, American football player and coach (died 2020)
- 1944 – Jesse Brown, American marine and politician, 2nd United States Secretary of Veterans Affairs (died 2002)
- 1944 – Bryan Campbell, Canadian ice hockey player
- 1946 – Michael Aris, Cuban-English author and academic (died 1999)
- 1946 – Andy Bown, British singer, songwriter and musician
- 1947 – Oliver Friggieri, Maltese author, critic, poet and philosopher (died 2020)
- 1947 – Brian Jones, English balloonist and pilot
- 1947 – Walt Mossberg, American journalist
- 1947 – Doug Wilkerson, American football player (died 2021)
- 1948 – Jens-Peter Bonde, Danish lawyer and politician (died 2021)
- 1950 – Tony Banks, English keyboardist and songwriter
- 1950 – Petros Efthymiou, Greek academic and politician, Greek Minister of Culture, Education and Religious Affairs
- 1950 – Maria Ewing, American soprano (died 2022)
- 1950 – Terry Yorath, Welsh international footballer and international manager (died 2026)
- 1951 – Andrei Kozyrev, Belgian-Russian politician and diplomat, Minister of Foreign Affairs for Russia
- 1951 – Chris Stewart, English musician and author
- 1952 – Annemarie Moser-Pröll, Austrian skier
- 1952 – Maria Schneider, French actress (died 2011)
- 1953 – Herman Ponsteen, Dutch cyclist
- 1954 – Gerard Batten, English lawyer and politician
- 1955 – Patrick McCabe, Irish writer
- 1955 – Mariano Rajoy, Spanish lawyer and politician, Prime Minister of Spain
- 1955 – Susan Neiman, American-German philosopher and author
- 1956 – Leung Kwok-hung, Hong Kong activist and politician
- 1956 – Thomas Wassberg, Swedish cross country skier
- 1957 – Kostas Vasilakakis, Greek footballer and manager
- 1957 – Stephen Dillane, English actor
- 1958 – Didier de Radiguès, Belgian race car driver and motorcycle racer
- 1959 – Andrew Farriss, Australian rock musician and multi-instrumentalist
- 1959 – Ivan Savvidis, Russian-Greek oligarch and politician
- 1960 – Hans Pflügler, German footballer
- 1960 – Renato Russo, Brazilian singer-songwriter and guitarist (died 1996)
- 1961 – Ellery Hanley, English rugby league player and coach
- 1961 – Tony Rominger, Swiss professional cyclist
- 1962 – Jann Arden, Canadian singer-songwriter
- 1962 – Brett French, Australian rugby league player
- 1962 – Rob Hollink, Dutch poker player
- 1962 – John O'Farrell, English journalist and author
- 1962 – Brad Wright, American-Spanish basketball player
- 1962 – Kevin J. Anderson, American science fiction writer
- 1963 – Cory Blackwell, American basketball player
- 1963 – Randall Cunningham, American football player, coach, and pastor
- 1963 – Georgios Katrougalos, Greek jurist and politician
- 1963 – Filippos Sachinidis, Greek-Canadian economist and politician
- 1963 – Gary Stevens, English-Australian footballer and physiotherapist
- 1963 – Quentin Tarantino, American director, producer, screenwriter and actor
- 1963 – Xuxa, Brazilian actress, singer, businesswoman and television presenter
- 1965 – Gregor Foitek, Swiss race car driver
- 1966 – Žarko Paspalj, Serbian basketball player
- 1967 – Kenta Kobashi, Japanese professional wrestler
- 1967 – Talisa Soto, American actress
- 1968 – Irina Belova, Russian heptathlete
- 1969 – Gianluigi Lentini, Italian footballer and manager
- 1969 – Pauley Perrette, American actress
- 1969 – Mariah Carey, American singer-songwriter, producer, and actress
- 1970 – Leila Pahlavi, Princess of Iran (died 2001)
- 1970 – Derek Aucoin, Canadian baseball player (died 2020)
- 1970 – Brent Fitz, Canadian-American multi-instrumentalist and recording artist
- 1970 – Jarrod McCracken, New Zealand rugby league player
- 1970 – Elizabeth Mitchell, American actress
- 1970 – Uwe Rosenberg, German game designer, created Bohnanza
- 1971 – David Coulthard, Scottish race car driver and sportscaster
- 1971 – Nathan Fillion, Canadian actor
- 1972 – Jimmy Floyd Hasselbaink, Surinamese-Dutch footballer, coach, and manager
- 1972 – Charlie Haas, American professional wrestler
- 1973 – Roger Telemachus, South African cricketer
- 1974 – Marek Citko, Polish footballer and manager
- 1974 – George Koumantarakis, Greek-South African footballer
- 1974 – Gaizka Mendieta, Spanish footballer
- 1975 – Andrew Blowers, New Zealand rugby player
- 1975 – Kim Felton, Australian golfer
- 1975 – Fergie, American singer-songwriter, dancer, and actress
- 1975 – Christian Fiedler, German footballer and manager
- 1976 – Roberta Anastase, Romanian politician, 57th President of the Chamber of Deputies of Romania
- 1976 – Danny Fortson, American basketball player
- 1976 – Adrian Anca, Romanian footballer
- 1977 – Vítor Meira, Brazilian race car driver
- 1977 – Ioannis Melissanidis, Greek artistic gymnast
- 1978 – Gabriel Paraschiv, Romanian footballer
- 1978 – Marius Bakken, Norwegian runner
- 1978 – Amélie Cocheteux, French tennis player
- 1979 – Tom Palmer, English rugby union player
- 1979 – Mohsen Moeini, Iranian author and director
- 1979 – Imran Tahir, Pakistani-South African cricketer
- 1979 – Jennifer Wilson, Zimbabwean-South African field hockey player
- 1980 – Sean Ryan, American football player
- 1980 – Michaela Paštiková, Czech tennis player
- 1980 – Maksim Shevchenko, Kazakhstani footballer
- 1981 – Terry McFlynn, Irish footballer
- 1981 – Akhil Kumar, Indian boxer
- 1981 – Jukka Keskisalo, Finnish runner
- 1981 – Hilda Kibet, Kenyan runner
- 1981 – Cacau, Brazilian-German footballer
- 1981 – JJ Lin, Singaporean singer-songwriter
- 1982 – Shawn Beveney, Guyanese footballer
- 1983 – Yuliya Golubchikova, Russian pole vaulter
- 1983 – Vasily Koshechkin, Russian ice hockey player
- 1983 – Román Martínez, Argentinian footballer
- 1984 – Adam Ashley-Cooper, Australian rugby player
- 1984 – Ben Franks, Australian-born New Zealand rugby player
- 1984 – Brett Holman, Australian footballer
- 1985 – Dustin Byfuglien, American ice hockey player
- 1985 – Danny Vukovic, Australian footballer
- 1986 – Manuel Neuer, German footballer
- 1987 – Jefferson Bernárdez, Honduran footballer
- 1987 – Samuel Francis, Nigerian-Qatari sprinter
- 1987 – Polina Gagarina, Russian singer-songwriter
- 1987 – Buster Posey, American baseball player
- 1988 – Jessie J, English singer-songwriter
- 1988 – Atsuto Uchida, Japanese footballer
- 1988 – Brenda Song, American actress
- 1988 – Mauro Goicoechea, Uruguayan footballer
- 1988 – Holliday Grainger, English actress
- 1989 – Matt Harvey, American baseball player
- 1989 – Camilla Lees, New Zealand netball player
- 1990 – Erdin Demir, Swedish-Turkish footballer
- 1990 – Ben Hunt, Australian rugby league player
- 1990 – Nicolas Nkoulou, Cameroonian footballer
- 1990 – Luca Zuffi, Swiss footballer
- 1990 – Kimbra, New Zealand musician
- 1990 – Brodha V, Indian rapper and music producer
- 1991 – London on da Track, American record producer
- 1992 – Marc Muniesa, Spanish footballer
- 1993 – Brandon Nimmo, American baseball player
- 1995 – Bill Tuiloma, New Zealand footballer
- 1997 – Lisa, Thai rapper and dancer
- 1998 – Giannis Bouzoukis, Greek footballer
- 1999 – Jesser, American YouTuber
- 1999 – Alex O'Connor, English media personality
- 2000 – Halle Bailey, American singer-songwriter and actress
- 2000 – Sophie Nélisse, Canadian actress
- 2001 – Natanael Cano, Mexican rapper and singer
- 2002 – Daria Snigur, Ukrainian tennis player

== Deaths ==
=== Pre-1600 ===
- 710 – Rupert of Salzburg, Austrian bishop and saint (born 660)
- 853 – Haymo of Halberstadt, German bishop and author (born 778)
- 913 – Du Xiao, chancellor of Later Liang
- 913 – Zhang empress of Later Liang
- 916 – Alduin I, Frankish nobleman
- 965 – Arnulf I, Count of Flanders (born c. 890)
- 973 – Hermann Billung, Frankish lieutenant (born 900)
- 1045 – Ali ibn Ahmad al-Jarjara'i, Fatimid vizier
- 1184 – Giorgi III, King of Georgia
- 1248 – Maud Marshal, English countess (born 1192)
- 1378 – Pope Gregory XI (born 1336)
- 1462 – Vasily II of Moscow (born 1415)
- 1472 – Janus Pannonius, Hungarian bishop and poet (born 1434)
- 1482 – Mary of Burgundy, Sovereign Duchess regnant of Burgundy, married to Maximilian I, Holy Roman Emperor (born 1457)
- 1564 – Lütfi Pasha, Turkish historian and politician, Grand Vizier of the Ottoman Empire (born 1488)
- 1572 – Girolamo Maggi, Italian polymath (born c. 1523)
- 1598 – Theodor de Bry, Belgian-German engraver, goldsmith, and publisher (born 1528)

=== 1601–1900 ===
- 1613 – Sigismund Báthory (born 1573)
- 1615 – Margaret of Valois (born 1553)
- 1621 – Benedetto Giustiniani, Italian cardinal (born 1554)
- 1624 – Ulrik of Denmark, Danish prince-bishop (born 1578)
- 1625 – James VI and I of the United Kingdom (born 1566)
- 1635 – Robert Naunton, English politician (born 1563)
- 1676 – Bernardino de Rebolledo, Spanish poet, soldier, and diplomat (born 1597)
- 1679 – Abraham Mignon, Dutch painter (born 1640)
- 1697 – Simon Bradstreet, English businessman and politician, 20th Governor of the Massachusetts Bay Colony (born 1603)
- 1729 – Leopold, Duke of Lorraine (born 1679)
- 1757 – Johann Stamitz, Czech violinist and composer (born 1717)
- 1770 – Giovanni Battista Tiepolo, Italian painter (born 1696)
- 1848 – Gabriel Bibron, French zoologist and herpetologist (born 1805)
- 1849 – Archibald Acheson, 2nd Earl of Gosford, Irish-Canadian politician, 35th Governor General of Canada (born 1776)
- 1850 – Wilhelm Beer, Prussian astronomer and banker (born 1797)
- 1864 – Jean-Jacques Ampère, French philologist and academic (born 1800)
- 1869 – James Harper, American publisher and politician, 65th Mayor of New York City (born 1795)
- 1875 – Juan Crisóstomo Torrico, Peruvian soldier and politician, President of Peru (born 1808)
- 1875 – Edgar Quinet, French historian and academic (born 1803)
- 1878 – George Gilbert Scott, English architect, designed the Albert Memorial and St Mary's Cathedral (born 1811)
- 1886 – Henry Taylor, English poet and playwright (born 1800)
- 1889 – John Bright, English politician, Secretary of State for Business, Innovation and Skills (born 1811)
- 1890 – Carl Jacob Löwig, German chemist and academic (born 1803)
- 1897 – Andreas Anagnostakis, Greek ophthalmologist, physician, and educator (born 1826)
- 1898 – Syed Ahmad Khan, Indian philosopher and activist (born 1817)
- 1900 – Joseph A. Campbell, American businessman, founded the Campbell's (born 1817)

=== 1901–present ===
- 1910 – Alexander Emanuel Agassiz, Swiss-American ichthyologist, zoologist, and engineer (born 1835)
- 1913 – Richard Montgomery Gano, American minister, physician, and general (born 1830)
- 1918 – Henry Adams, American journalist, historian, and author (born 1838)
- 1918 – Martin Sheridan, Irish-American discus thrower and jumper (born 1881)
- 1921 – Harry Barron, English general and politician, 16th Governor of Western Australia (born 1847)
- 1922 – Nikolay Sokolov, Russian composer and educator (born 1859)
- 1923 – James Dewar, Scottish chemist and physicist (born 1842)
- 1925 – Carl Neumann, German mathematician and academic (born 1832)
- 1926 – Kick Kelly, American baseball player, manager, and umpire (born 1856)
- 1926 – Georges Vézina, Canadian ice hockey player (born 1887)
- 1927 – Joe Start, American baseball player and manager (born 1842)
- 1927 – Klaus Berntsen, Danish politician, Prime Minister of Denmark (born 1844)
- 1928 – Leslie Stuart, English organist and composer (born 1863)
- 1931 – Arnold Bennett, English author and playwright (born 1867)
- 1934 – Francis William Reitz, South African lawyer and politician, 5th State President of the Orange Free State (born 1844)
- 1938 – William Stern, German-American psychologist and philosopher (born 1871)
- 1940 – Michael Joseph Savage, Australian-New Zealand politician, 23rd Prime Minister of New Zealand (born 1872)
- 1940 – Dan Kolov, Bulgarian professional wrestler (born 1892)
- 1942 – Julio González, Catalan sculptor and painter (born 1876)
- 1943 – George Monckton-Arundell, 8th Viscount Galway, English politician, 5th Governor-General of New Zealand (born 1882)
- 1945 – Vincent Hugo Bendix, American engineer and businessman, founded Bendix Corporation (born 1881)
- 1945 – Halid Ziya Uşaklıgil, Turkish author, poet, and playwright (born 1866)
- 1946 – Karl Groos, German psychologist and philosopher (born 1861)
- 1949 – Elisheva Bikhovski, Israeli-Russian poet (born 1888)
- 1952 – Kiichiro Toyoda, Japanese businessman, founded Toyota (born 1894)
- 1956 – Évariste Lévi-Provençal, French orientalist and historian (born 1894)
- 1958 – Leon C. Phillips, American lawyer and politician, 11th Governor of Oklahoma (born 1890)
- 1960 – Gregorio Marañón, Spanish physician, philosopher, and author (born 1887)
- 1967 – Jaroslav Heyrovský, Czech chemist and academic, Nobel Prize laureate (born 1890)
- 1968 – Yuri Gagarin, Russian colonel, pilot, and astronaut (born 1934)
- 1968 – Vladimir Seryogin, Russian soldier and pilot (born 1922)
- 1972 – Lorenzo Wright, American athlete (born 1926)
- 1973 – Mikhail Kalatozov, Georgian-Russian director, screenwriter, and cinematographer (born 1903)
- 1974 – Eduardo Santos, Colombian journalist, lawyer, and politician, 15th President of Colombia (born 1888)
- 1975 – Arthur Bliss, English conductor and composer (born 1891)
- 1976 – Georg August Zinn, German lawyer and politician, Minister President of Hesse (born 1901)
- 1977 – Shirley Graham Du Bois, American author, playwright, and composer (born 1896)
- 1977 – Diana Hyland, American actress (born 1936)
- 1977 – Jacob Veldhuyzen van Zanten, Dutch airline pilot (born 1927)
- 1978 – Nat Bailey, Canadian businessman, founded the White Spot (born 1902)
- 1978 – Kunwar Digvijay Singh, Indian field hockey (born 1922)
- 1978 – Sverre Farstad, Norwegian speed skater (born 1920)
- 1980 – Steve Fisher, American author and screenwriter (born 1912)
- 1981 – Jakob Ackeret, Swiss engineer and academic (born 1898)
- 1982 – Fazlur Khan, Bangladeshi-American engineer and architect, designed the John Hancock Center and Willis Tower (born 1929)
- 1987 – William Bowers, American journalist and screenwriter (born 1916)
- 1988 – Charles Willeford, American author, poet, and critic (born 1919)
- 1989 – May Allison, American actress (born 1890)
- 1989 – Malcolm Cowley, American novelist, poet, and literary critic (born 1898)
- 1990 – Percy Beard, American hurdler and coach (born 1908)
- 1991 – Aldo Ray, American actor (born 1926)
- 1992 – Colin Gibson, English footballer (born 1923)
- 1992 – Lang Hancock, Australian businessman (born 1909)
- 1992 – James E. Webb, American colonel and politician, 16th Under Secretary of State (born 1906)
- 1993 – Kamal Hassan Ali, Egyptian general and politician, Prime Minister of Egypt (born 1921)
- 1993 – Paul László, Hungarian-American architect and interior designer (born 1900)
- 1994 – Elisabeth Schmid, German archaeologist and osteologist (born 1912)
- 1994 – Lawrence Wetherby, American lawyer and politician, 48th Governor of Kentucky (born 1908)
- 1995 – René Allio, French director and screenwriter (born 1924)
- 1997 – Lane Dwinell, American businessman and politician, 69th Governor of New Hampshire (born 1906)
- 1997 – Ella Maillart, Swiss skier, sailor, field hockey player, and photographer (born 1903)
- 1998 – David McClelland, American psychologist and academic (born 1917)
- 1999 – Michael Aris, Cuban-English author and academic (born 1946)
- 2000 – George Allen, Canadian ice hockey player and coach (born 1914)
- 2000 – Ian Dury, English singer-songwriter and actor (born 1942)
- 2002 – Milton Berle, American comedian and actor (born 1908)
- 2002 – Dudley Moore, English actor (born 1935)
- 2002 – Billy Wilder, Austrian-born American director, producer, and screenwriter (born 1906)
- 2003 – Edwin Carr, New Zealand composer and educator (born 1926)
- 2004 – Robert Merle, French author (born 1909)
- 2005 – Wilfred Gordon Bigelow, Canadian soldier and surgeon (born 1913)
- 2006 – Dan Curtis, American director and producer (born 1928)
- 2006 – Stanisław Lem, Ukrainian-Polish author (born 1921)
- 2006 – Rudolf Vrba, Czech Holocaust survivor and educator (born 1924)
- 2006 – Neil Williams, English cricketer (born 1962)
- 2007 – Nancy Adams, New Zealand botanist and illustrator (born 1926)
- 2007 – Paul Lauterbur, American chemist and academic, Nobel Prize laureate (born 1929)
- 2008 – Jean-Marie Balestre, French businessman (born 1921)
- 2009 – Irving R. Levine, American journalist and author (born 1922)
- 2010 – Dick Giordano, American illustrator (born 1932)
- 2011 – Clement Arrindell, Nevisian judge and politician, 1st Governor-General of Saint Kitts and Nevis (born 1931)
- 2011 – Farley Granger, American actor (born 1925)
- 2012 – Adrienne Rich, American poet, essayist and feminist (born 1929)
- 2013 – Hjalmar Andersen, Norwegian speed skater (born 1923)
- 2013 – Yvonne Brill, Canadian-American scientist and engineer (born 1924)
- 2013 – Fay Kanin, American screenwriter and producer (born 1917)
- 2014 – Richard N. Frye, American scholar and academic (born 1920)
- 2014 – James R. Schlesinger, American economist and politician, 12th United States Secretary of Defense and first United States Secretary of Energy (born 1929)
- 2015 – Johnny Helms, American trumpet player, bandleader, and educator (born 1935)
- 2015 – T. Sailo, Indian soldier and politician, 2nd Chief Minister of Mizoram (born 1922)
- 2016 – Mother Angelica, American Roman Catholic religious leader and media personality (born 1923)
- 2018 – Bert Nievera, Filipino-American singer (born 1936)
- 2024 – Daniel Kahneman, Israeli-American author, psychologist and economist, Nobel Prize laureate (born 1934)
- 2024 – Joe Lieberman, American politician and lawyer (born 1942)
- 2025 – Christina McKelvie, Scottish politician (born 1968)
- 2026 – Henry Lee, Chinese-American forensic scientist (born 1938)

== Holidays and observances ==
- Christian feast day:
  - Easter (Palmarian Church)
  - Alexander, a Pannonian soldier, martyred in 3rd century.
  - Amador of Portugal
  - Augusta of Treviso
  - Charles Henry Brent (Episcopal Church (USA))
  - Gelasius, Archbishop of Armagh
  - John of Egypt
  - Panacea De' Muzzi
  - Philetus
  - Romulus of Nîmes, a Benedictine abbot, martyred c. 730.
  - Rupert of Salzburg
  - Zanitas and Lazarus of Persia
  - March 27 (Eastern Orthodox liturgics)
- Armed Forces Day (Myanmar)
- Day of the Union of Bessarabia with Romania (Romania)
- World Theatre Day (International)
