= Belkov =

Belkov (masculine, Russian: Белков) or Belkova (feminine, Russian: Белкова) is a Russian surname. Notable people with the surname include:

- Gennadiy Belkov (born 1955), Uzbekistani high jumper
- Konstantin Belkov (born 1980), Russian football player
- Maxim Belkov (born 1985), Russian road cyclist
- Olga Bielkova (born 1975), Ukrainian economist and politician
- Vladimir Belkov (1941–2022), Russian football coach and former player
