= Protasov =

Protasovv (Russian: Протасов) is a Russian masculine surname, its feminine counterpart is Protasova. It may refer to:

- Anna Protasova (1745–1826), Russian lady-in-waiting and noble
- Igor Protasov (born 1964), Russian professional football coach and a former player
- Nikolay Protasov (1798–1855), Russian general and noble
- Oleh Protasov (born 1964), Ukrainian football player
- Yevhen Protasov (born 1997), Ukrainian football player
- Yuriy Protasov (born 1984), Ukrainian rally driver
