= Khairullin =

Khairullin, Khayrulin or Khairulin (Russian: Хайруллин or Хайрулин) is a Tatar masculine surname, its feminine counterpart is Khairullina, Khayrulina or Khairulina. It may refer to

- Galimdzhan Khayrulin (born 1974), Russian football manager and a former player
- Ildar Khairullin (born 1990), Russian chess player
- Marat Khairullin (born 1984), Kazakh football player
- Ramil Khayrulin (born 1985), Russian film producer, filmmaker and screenwriter
