= Kurdyumov =

Kurdyumov (Russian: Курдюмов) is a Russian masculine surname. Its feminine counterpart is Kurdyumova.

It may refer to:

- Aleksandr Kurdyumov (b. 1967), Russian member of the State Duma
- Andrei Kurdyumov (born 1972), Kazakhstani footballer
- Georgii Kurdyumov (1902–1996), Soviet metallurgist and physicist
- Sergei P. Kurdyumov (1928–2004), Russian specialist in mathematics and physics
- Vladimir Kurdyumov (1895–1970), Soviet Lieutenant General in 1940
