= Nikolay Leonov (footballer) =

Russian footballer and official

Personal information
- Full name: Nikolay Nikolayevich Leonov
- Date of birth: 1 November 1955 (age 70)
- Place of birth: Sverdlovsk, Russian SFSR
- Height: 1.82 m (5 ft 11 1/2 in)
- Position: Goalkeeper

Youth career
- Uralmash Sverdlovsk

Senior career*
Years	Team	Apps	(Gls)
1972–1973	Uralets Nizhny Tagil	9	(0)
1973–1979	Uralmash Sverdlovsk	113	(0)
1980–1981	Lokomotiv Moscow	25	(0)
1981	Metalist Kharkiv	4	(0)
1982	Spartak Tambov	16	(0)
1983	Dnepr Mogilev	0	(0)
1984	Tekstilshchik Andizhan		
1985	FC Shakhrikhanets Shakhrikhan	32	(0)
1986	Pakhtakor Andizhan	36	(0)
1987	Uralmash Sverdlovsk	17	(0)
1988	Torpedo Zaporizhzhia	39	(0)
1989–1990	Nyva Vinnytsia	26	(0)

Managerial career
- 1991: Podillya Khmelnytskyi (director)
- 1995: Uralmash Yekaterinburg (scout)
- 2005: Zhenis (assistant)
- 2010–2011: Gornyak Uchaly (director)
- * Club domestic league appearances and goals

Nikolay Nikolayevich Leonov (Russian: Никола́й Никола́евич Лео́нов; born 1 November 1955) is a Russian professional association football official and a former player.

== Club career ==
He spent one season in 1980 in the Soviet Top League for FC Lokomotiv Moscow.
