= Khazret Dyshekov =

Russian footballer

Personal information
- Full name: Khazret Zhangeriyevich Dyshekov
- Date of birth: 24 August 1965 (age 61)
- Place of birth: Terek, Russian SFSR
- Height: 1.79 m (5 ft 10 1/2 in)
- Position: Striker

Senior career*
Years	Team	Apps	(Gls)
1982–1984	Spartak Armavir		
1986–1995	Chernomorets Novorossiysk	337	(125)
1996	Kuban Krasnodar	33	(5)
1997	Torpedo Armavir	20	(2)
1997	Avtozapchast Baksan	17	(4)

Managerial career
- 2000–2001: Chernomorets Novorossiysk (reserves)
- 2000–2002: Chernomorets Novorossiysk (assistant)
- 2001: Chernomorets Novorossiysk (caretaker)
- 2002: Chernomorets Novorossiysk
- 2003: Lada-Tolyatti (assistant)
- 2003: Lada-Tolyatti (caretaker)
- 2003: Lada-Tolyatti (caretaker)
- 2003: Lada-Tolyatti (caretaker)
- 2003: Lada-Tolyatti (caretaker)
- 2003: Chernomorets Novorossiysk (assistant)
- 2004–2006: Volgar-Gazprom Astrakhan
- 2007–2008: Chernomorets Novorossiysk
- 2009: Kaisar
- 2009: Volga Nizhny Novgorod
- 2010–2011: Chernomorets Novorossiysk
- 2011–2012: Volgar Astrakhan
- 2013: Khimki (assistant)
- 2014: Luch-Energiya Vladivostok (assistant)
- 2015: Vityaz Krymsk
- 2015–2016: Baltika Kaliningrad (assistant)
- 2016–2017: Sochi
- 2017–2019: Chernomorets Novorossiysk
- * Club domestic league appearances and goals

Khazret Zhangeriyevich Dyshekov (Russian: Хазрет Жангериевич Дышеков; born 24 August 1965) is a Russian professional football coach and former player.

== Coaching career ==
On 7 June 2019, Russian Football Union banned him from football activity for one year after he accepted a 500,000 rubles bonus from Urozhay Krasnodar before the game of his team Chernomorets Novorossiysk against Urozhay's competitor Chayka Peschanokopskoye.

== Honours ==
- Russian Second Division Zone South best manager: 2004, 2010.

== Personal life ==
His son Zhangeri Dyshekov also became a professional football player.
