= 2016 Lahore suicide bombing =

Anti-Christian terrorist attack by the Taliban in Lahore, Pakistan

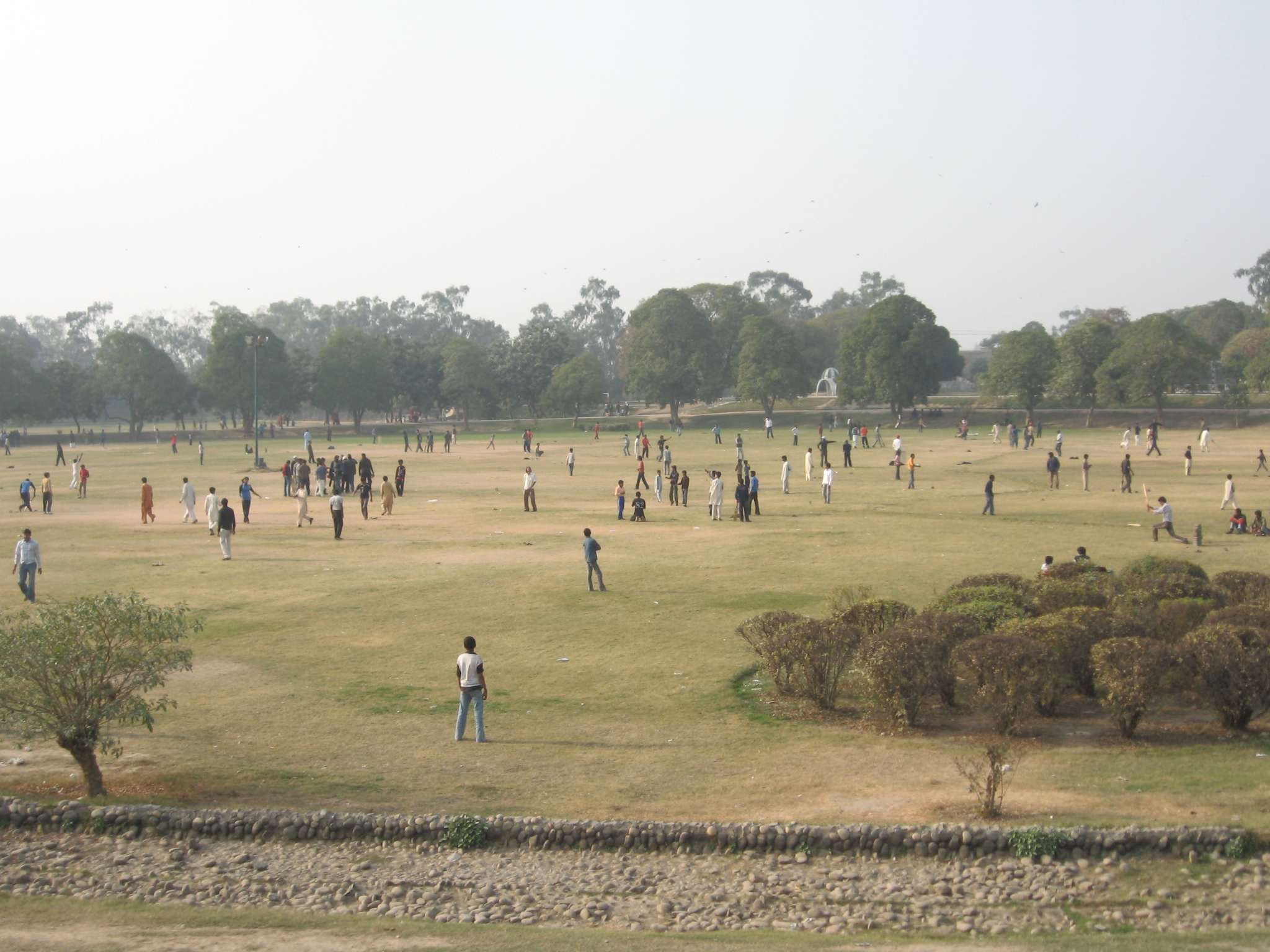
- A photograph of Gulshan-e-Iqbal Park. The bomb was detonated by the park's main gateway (not pictured).

- Location: 31.51625°N 74.29032°E; Gulshan-e-Iqbal Park, Lahore, Punjab, Pakistan
- Date: 27 March 2016; 18:30 (UTC+05:00)
- Target: Pakistani Christians
- Attack type: Suicide bombing
- Weapon: Explosive belt
- Deaths: 75 (including 29 children)
- Injuries: 340
- Victim: Visitors of the park on the Easter weekend
- Perpetrator: Jamaat-ul-Ahrar

On 27 March 2016, on Easter Sunday, at least 75 people were killed (29 fatalities being children), and over 340 were injured, in a suicide bombing that hit the main entrance of Gulshan-e-Iqbal Park, one of the largest parks in Lahore, Pakistan. The attack targeted Christians who were celebrating Easter. The majority of the victims were women and children. Jamaat-ul-Ahrar, a group affiliated with the Pakistani Taliban, claimed responsibility for the attack. The attack led to worldwide condemnation and national mourning throughout Pakistan. Pakistan also launched a widespread counter-terrorism operation in South Punjab, arresting more than 200 people who may have had a possible connection to the attack.

== Background ==
The Pakistani Taliban operates as an umbrella organization for various Islamist militant groups in Pakistan. These extremist groups have frequently attacked Christians, who make up 2% of Pakistan's population. Jamaat-ul-Ahrar, the perpetrator of the current attack, and once a breakaway organization that reunited in March 2015, have declared their intention to carry out more attacks in the future.

== Bombing ==
The bombing took place at 18:30; a Rescue 1122 spokesman stated that they received an emergency call around 18:44, and 23 ambulances were sent to the location. The perpetrator used an explosives-packed vest. More than 40 bodies arrived at Jinnah Hospital. A shortage of ambulances forced taxis and rickshaws to transport the injured. Responsibility was claimed by the Jamaat-ul-Ahrar, a group affiliated with the Pakistani Taliban, that had previously been responsible for bombings at two Lahore churches on 15 March 2015. A statement by Jamaat-ul-Ahrar spokesman Ehsanullah Ehsan said the attack was directed at Christians.

Witnesses reported that the blast occurred at the entrance of the park. There were Christians in the park due to Easter, although there was no Easter celebration or ceremony in the park. The front entrances were crowded with people, including children. Witnesses reported that "children body parts" were flying in every direction. Due to the blast force, several bodies were flung into the air. The blast could be heard many kilometers away. Local residents reported that the noise was deafening. Shortly afterward, panic ensued, as people began screaming and running. A witness said:

"It was so crowded that there was even no way of entering it. We went to a canteen to have something to eat when there was suddenly a big blast. Everyone panicked, running to all directions. Many of them were blocked at the gate of the park. Dead bodies can be found everywhere".

== Aftermath ==
After the attack, citizens rushed to hospitals in response to urgent requests for blood donations. On-demand cab service, Careem, offered free rides to the hospital for blood donors, while activists also used social media to coordinate relief efforts, including donating blood, food, and cash. Half of the more than 300 victims were taken to Jinnah Hospital in Lahore on Sunday night. 67 remained in the hospital with various injuries, such as burns and shrapnel wounds, doctors said. Prime Minister Nawaz Sharif held a meeting in response to the bombing. Pakistan's army chief, General Raheel Sharif, also convened an emergency meeting of the country's intelligence agencies to begin to track down those responsible for the attacks. On 28 March, Prime Minister Sharif directed law enforcement agencies to step up counter-terror operations against terrorists and their abettors in southern Punjab. The prime minister issued these orders to the LEAs while chairing a high-level meeting at the Chief Minister House in Lahore, to review the attack and overall strategy against terrorists. He later said his government goal was to "eliminate terror infrastructure from Pakistan, but also the extremist mindset, which is a threat to our way of life".

The chairman of the Pakistan Tehreek-e-Insaf party, Imran Khan, visited the victims of the blast in Jinnah Hospital. He later told the media that the current government needs to implement a National Action Plan and develop a consensus to go after terrorists in whichever province they are seeking refuge. He added that Pakistan's Government had failed to provide security to Pakistani people and that it must revisit its priorities. He later condemned the attack by saying: "It is strictly against the teachings of our Holy Prophet (Muhammad), and the basic principles of Islam."

On 28 March, in Punjab, several suspected terrorists were arrested, along with firearms with full ammo recovered in different parts of Lahore, Faisalabad, and Multan. Since the night of 27 March, the army had conducted a military operation for capturing the terrorists involved. Al Jazeera noted that the bombing "underscored" both the "precarious position" of Pakistan's minorities, and the fact that the fighters from armed groups "are still capable of staging wide-scale assaults despite the months-long military offensive targeting their hideouts and safe havens in remote tribal areas". On 29 March, Pakistani authorities conducted a counter-terror operation, with more than 5,000 questioned, and more than 200 suspects detained. Anonymous government and security sources told Reuters that a decision has been made to launch a full-scale crackdown on Islamist militants in Punjab, which may involve the paramilitary Rangers, who have been operating in Karachi for the last two years.

== Reactions ==
President of Pakistan, Mamnoon Hussain; Governor of Punjab, Malik Muhammad Rafique Rajwana; and Chief Minister of Punjab, Mian Shahbaz Sharif, condemned the attack and announced three days of mourning. Business leaders announced that all shopping malls, bazaars, and markets in Lahore would be closed on 28 March, the day following the bombing. Several news agencies in Pakistan, such as the Express Tribune, changed their websites to display everything only in greyscale.

The Pakistan Army said it would begin military operations across Punjab in response to the bombings; targeting militants, their facilitators, and their hideouts. United Nations Secretary-General Ban Ki-moon condemned the attack and called for Islamabad to protect religious minorities. The bombing was condemned, and condolences were offered by the leaders and spokespeople of many countries, as well as by church leaders.

The victims and their relatives expressed concern about the lack of security and protection.

The British Pakistan Christian Association, chaired by Wilson Chowdhry, condemned the 2016 Lahore suicide bombing, and appealed to the Government of India to "open its doors and provide safe heaven [sic] to Christians of Pakistan before they themselves start migrating in distress towards India for safety".

== See also ==
- 2017 Lahore suicide bombing
- List of terrorist incidents, January–June 2016
- Terrorist incidents in Pakistan in 2016
- List of Islamist terrorist attacks
- Peshawar church attack
- Lahore church bombings
- Christianity in Pakistan
- Persecution of Christians in the Muslim world
- Terrorist incidents in Lahore since 2000
