= Pavol Pavlus =

Slovak football midfielder (born 1974)

Personal information
- Date of birth: 22 June 1974 (age 52)
- Place of birth: Myjava, Czechoslovakia
- Height: 1.85 m (6 ft 1 in)
- Position: Midfielder

Senior career*
Years	Team	Apps	(Gls)
1994–1996	Spartak Trnava		
1996–1997	Slovan Liberec	12	(0)
1997–1998	Spartak Trnava		
1998	Viktoria Žižkov	12	(0)
1999–2000	DAC Dunajská Streda		
2001	Chernomorets Novorossiysk	10	(0)
2002	Spartak Trnava		
2003	ASKÖ Klingenbach		
2004–2006	Bad Aussee		
2006–2007	SV Kieninger-Bau Bad Goisern		
- * Club domestic league appearances and goals

Pavol Pavlus (born 22 June 1974) is a Slovak former football midfielder who played for clubs in Czechoslovakia, Russia and Austria.

== Career ==
Born in Myjava, Pavlus began playing football for local side FC Spartak Trnava, and played 21 league matches for the club before his 21st birthday. Later, he would make 24 appearances in the Czech first division for FC Slovan Liberec and FK Viktoria Žižkov. He also made 10 appearances for FC Chernomorets Novorossiysk in the Russian Premier League.
