= Aleksei Alyakrinsky =

Russian footballer

Personal information
- Full name: Aleksei Aleksandrovich Alyakrinsky
- Date of birth: 22 November 1976 (age 49)
- Place of birth: Moscow, Russian SFSR
- Height: 1.89 m (6 ft 2 in)
- Position: Defender

Youth career
- FC Torpedo Moscow

Senior career*
Years	Team	Apps	(Gls)
1994	FC Rossiya Moscow	24	(0)
1995	FC Dynamo-d Moscow	29	(0)
1996	FC Dynamo-2 Moscow	34	(2)
1997	FC Monolit Moscow	37	(1)
1998–1999	FC Spartak-2 Moscow	74	(7)
2000–2002	FC Chernomorets Novorossiysk	36	(0)
2002	FC Kristall Smolensk	13	(0)
2003–2005	FC Fakel Voronezh	92	(0)
2006	FC Metallurg Lipetsk	16	(0)
2007	FC Lobnya-Alla Lobnya	27	(5)
2008–2010	FC Zvezda Serpukhov	45	(6)
- * Club domestic league appearances and goals

Aleksei Aleksandrovich Alyakrinsky (Russian: Алексей Александрович Алякринский; born 22 November 1976) is a former Russian professional footballer.

== Club career ==
He made his debut in the Russian Premier League in 2000 for FC Chernomorets Novorossiysk. He played 2 games in the UEFA Cup 2001–02 for FC Chernomorets Novorossiysk.

== Honours ==
- Russian Second Division Zone Center best defender: 2004.
