= Gennadiy Sharipov =

Uzbekistani footballer

Personal information
- Full name: Gennadiy Nikolayevich Sharipov
- Date of birth: 29 August 1974 (age 52)
- Height: 1.74 m (5 ft 8 1/2 in)
- Positions: Defender; midfielder; striker

Senior career*
| Years | Team | Apps | (Gls) |
| 1990–1992 | FC Zarafshan Navoi | 57 | (5) |
| 1992 | FC Torpedo Miass | 10 | (0) |
| 1993–2000 | FK Buxoro | 183 | (26) |
| 2000–2001 | Pakhtakor Tashkent FK | 54 | (4) |
| 2002 | FC Lada Togliatti | 33 | (3) |
| 2003 | FC Volgar-Gazprom Astrakhan | 26 | (1) |
| 2003 | FC Vityaz Podolsk | 11 | (1) |
| 2004 | FC Chernomorets Novorossiysk | 16 | (0) |
| 2005 | FC Vityaz Podolsk | 25 | (3) |
| 2006 | FC Don Novomoskovsk | 29 | (3) |
| 2007 | FC ZiO-Podolsk | | |

International career
| 1999–2000 | Uzbekistan | 2 | (0) |

Managerial career
- 2008–2009: FC Vityaz Podolsk (administrator)
- * Club domestic league appearances and goals

Gennadiy Nikolayevich Sharipov (Russian: Геннадий Николаевич Шарипов; born 29 August 1974) is a former Uzbekistani professional footballer. He also holds Russian citizenship.

== Club career ==
He made his professional debut in the Soviet Second League in 1990 for FC Zarafshan Navoi.

== International career ==
International appearances
| # | Date | Venue | Opponent | Result | Min | Competition |
|---|---|---|---|---|---|---|
| 1. | 11 July 1999 | Samarkand, Uzbekistan | Malaysia | 3–0 | (substituted on) 62' | Friendly |
| 2. | 18 May 2000 | Bangkok, Thailand | Thailand | 0–2 | (substituted off) 66' | Friendly |
