= Oleksiy Osipov =

Ukrainian footballer

Personal information
- Full name: Oleksiy Rudolfovych Osipov
- Date of birth: 2 November 1975 (age 50)
- Place of birth: Simferopol, Ukrainian SSR
- Height: 1.70 m (5 ft 7 in)
- Position: Defender

Youth career
- –1993: UOR Simferopol

Senior career*
Years	Team	Apps	(Gls)
1993	FC Tytan Armyansk	6	(0)
1993–1994	SC Tavriya Simferopol	3	(0)
1994–1995	FC Tytan Armyansk	32	(4)
1995–1996	FC Krystal Kherson	29	(8)
1997–1999	SC Tavriya Simferopol	79	(18)
1997	→ FC Dynamo Saky (loan)	1	(0)
2000–2001	FC Krylia Sovetov Samara	32	(2)
2000	→ FC Krylia Sovetov-2 Samara	1	(0)
2001	FC Chernomorets Novorossiysk	14	(0)
2002	FC Arsenal Kyiv	6	(0)
2002–2003	SC Tavriya Simferopol	25	(5)
2004	FC Terek Grozny	7	(0)
2005	FC Aktobe	6	(0)
2005	FC Dynamo-Ihroservice Simferopol	13	(1)
2006	SC Tavriya Simferopol	2	(0)
2007–2008	FC Ihroservice Simferopol	22	(3)

Managerial career
- 2014–2015: FC TSK Simferopol (director of sports)
- * Club domestic league appearances and goals

Oleksiy Rudolfovych Osipov (Ukrainian: Олексій Рудольфович Осіпов); Aleksei Rudolfovich Osipov (Russian: Алексей Рудольфович Осипов; born 2 November 1975) is a former Ukrainian footballer.

== Club career ==
He made his professional debut in the Ukrainian Second League in 1993 for FC Tytan Armyansk.
