= Terrorist incidents in Pakistan in 2016 =

This is a list of terrorist incidents in Pakistan in 2016. Pakistan was the 10th most dangerous country by criminality index in 2016.

== January ==
13 January - At least 15 people are killed and several injured after a bomb explodes near a polio centre near the Pakistani city of Quetta.

20 January - At least 20 people are killed and 60 wounded after gunmen open fire at Bacha Khan University.

29 January - A suicide bomber, attempted to enter Cantonement area in Zhob District when the Friday prayers were underway and blew himself at a check-post after security personnel signalled him to stop. Seven people were injured.Tehreek-e-Taliban Pakistan claimed responsibility.

== February ==
6 February - At least 9 people were killed and several others were wounded when a suicide bomber hit a vehicle of Frontier Corps (FC) in Quetta.

== March ==
7 March - At least 10 people including three police constables were killed and 14 others were injured in a suicide blast in the premises of a local court in Charsadda district in Pakistan's troubled northwest, DPO Charsadda Khalid Sohail told Dunya News.

16 March - A bomb detonates in a bus carrying government employees in Peshawar, Pakistan, killing 17 and injuring at least 53.

27 March - At least 74 people were killed and 338 others were injured in a suicide bombing that hit the main entrance of Gulshan-e-Iqbal Park, one of the largest parks in Lahore.

== April ==
19 April - At least one person was killed and 17 others wounded on April 19 after a suicide bomber attacked an Excise and Taxation office in Mardan, police and officials said.

== June ==
22 June - Pakistani Sufi singer Amjad Sabri shot dead in Karachi.

== August ==
8 August - A bomb blast outside a hospital where lawyers had gathered to mourn the death of a prominent lawyer killed at least 70 people in Quetta

== September ==
2 September - At least 14 killed, 52 wounded in suicide blast at Mardan district courts in Peshawar.

13 September - A suicide bomber injured between 10 and 13 people, four of whom were policemen. The attack occurred in Shikarpur a city in Sindh. Other Suicide bomber, who was arrested in Shikarpur had got training in Afghanistan.

16 September - At least 23 people were killed and dozens more injured when a suicide bomber detonated his vest in the veranda of a mosque during Friday prayers in the Mohmand Tribal District, bordering Afghanistan.

== October ==
24 October - At least 3 militants stormed a police training center in Quetta and took between 200 and 500 cadets hostage. Two of the attackers blew themselves up while the third attacker was killed. At least 60 people were killed and more than 190 people were injured. The attack was claimed by Islamic State.

25 October - A police officer was killed when an IED bomb targeting polio workers went off in the city of Peshawar.

26 October - A polio vaccinator was gunned down on Wednesday. The attack occurred in Jamrud and town in Khyber Pakhtunkhwa.

28 October - Lt Col Sufiyan FC Awaran received sniper bullets injuries to both legs during an ambush near Doleji post Awaran Balochistan.

29 October - 5 people were killed when unidentified assailants opened fire at a religious gathering in Karachi's Nazimabad area.

== November ==
- 12 November - At least 52 people were killed and over 100 others were injured when a suicide bomber blew himself up inside the shrine of Shah Noorani in Khuzdar, Balochistan after evening prayers.
- 22 November - 3 Frontier Corps (FC) personnel were killed and 5 others were injured after a grenade attack on a funeral in Peshawar.
- 22 November - A man was killed and 3 others were injured in a bomb attack in Chaman near Quetta.
- 26 November - 2 Frontier Corps (FC) personnel were killed and 14 others injured when 4 suicide bombers attacked a camp in Mohmand. All 4 attackers were killed. The attack was claimed by Jamaat-ul-Ahrar, a Taliban splinter group.
- 26 November - Two security guards were killed when militants attacked the vehicle of an oil exploration company in Gwadar.

== See also ==
- 2016 in Pakistan
- Terrorism in Pakistan
- List of terrorist incidents, 2016
