= FC Lada-Tolyatti =

Russian football club

Lada
- Full name: Football Club; Lada-Tolyatti
- Founded: 1970
- Ground: Torpedo Stadium, Tolyatti
- Capacity: 18,000
- Owner: Lada (AvtoVAZ)
- Chairman: Aleksey Patrikeyev
- League: TBC
- 2024: Russian Second League, Division B, Group 4, 9th
- Website: fc-lada.com
Home colours	Away colours

FC Lada-Tolyatti (Russian: ФК "Лада-Тольятти") is a Russian football club based in Tolyatti.

== History ==
The club was founded in 1970 at the VAZ automobile company under the name of Torpedo. The team played in the Soviet Second League until the dissolution of USSR. In 1988 the club was renamed after VAZ's Lada brand.

Since entering the Russian First Division in 1992 Lada experienced a number of divisional movements. They played in the Top Division in 1994 and 1996, in the First Division in 1992–1993, 1995, 1997–1998, 2000–2003 and 2006, and in the Second Division in 1999 and 2004–2005. Both spells in the Top Division were unsuccessful, as Lada finished last. Lada reached the semifinal of the Russian Cup in 2002/03. Lada Togliatti failed to obtain the First Division licence and were thus relegated to Second Division in 2007.

The club dropped out of professional competition once again before the 2022–23 season, due to lack of financing. For the 2024 season, it was licensed for Russian Second League Division B. It dropped out of the league yet again at the end of the 2024 season.

== Reserve squad ==
Lada's reserve squad played professionally as FC Lada-d Togliatti in the Russian Third League in 1995.

== Notable players ==
Had international caps for their respective countries. Players whose name is listed in bold represented their countries while playing for Lada.

- (Soviet Union) Vasili Zhupikov
- (Russia) Maksim Buznikin
- (Russia) Maksim Demenko
- (Russia) Yevgeni Kharlachyov
- (Russia) (Ukraine) Aleksei Bakharev
- (Armenia) Barsegh Kirakosyan
- (Belarus) Alyaksandr Sulima
- (Georgia (country)) **Vaso Sepashvili**
- (Kazakhstan) **Andrei Miroshnichenko**
- (Kazakhstan) Konstantin Pavlyuchenko
- (Kazakhstan) **Maksim Shevchenko**
- (Latvia) Konstantīns Igošins
- (Lithuania) **Nerijus Barasa**
- (Tajikistan) Rahmatullo Fuzailov
- (Turkmenistan) **Charyar Mukhadov**
- (Ukraine) Yevhen Drahunov
- (Ukraine) Yuri Hudymenko
- (Ukraine) Volodymyr Savchenko
- (Uzbekistan) Aleksandr Khvostunov
- (Uzbekistan) Andrei Rezantsev
- (Uzbekistan) Gennadiy Sharipov
- (Uzbekistan) Maksim Shatskikh
- (Uzbekistan) **Vladimir Shishelov**

== See also ==
- FC Academiya
- FC Togliatti
- Konoplyov football academy
