= Lev Mayorov =

Azerbaijani footballer (1969–2020)

Personal information
- Full name: Lev Nikolayevich Mayorov
- Date of birth: 13 October 1969
- Place of birth: Baku, Azerbaijani SSR, Soviet Union
- Date of death: 1 February 2020 (aged 50)
- Place of death: Novorossiysk, Krasnodar Krai, Russia
- Height: 1.78 m (5 ft 10 in)
- Positions: Midfielder; striker

Youth career
- Neftchi Baku PFC

Senior career*
Years	Team	Apps	(Gls)
1986–1987	Neftchi Baku PFC (reserves)		
1988	FC Bakinets Baku	13	(1)
1989	Kapaz Ganja	7	(0)
1990	FC Kuban Krasnodar	13	(0)
1990–1991	FC Kuban Barannikovskiy	49	(12)
1992–2005	FC Chernomorets Novorossiysk	388	(38)

International career
1994	Azerbaijan	1	(0)

Managerial career
- 2007: FC Spartak-UGP Anapa (assistant)
- 2008: FC Spartak-UGP Anapa
- 2009: FC Stavropol
- 2011–2012: FC Olimpia Gelendzhik
- 2012–2015: FC Chernomorets Novorossiysk (assistant)
- * Club domestic league appearances and goals

Lev Nikolayevich Mayorov (Russian: Лев Николаевич Майоров; 13 October 1969 – 1 February 2020) was an Azerbaijani professional football coach and player. He died on 1 February 2020.

== Club career ==
He played 2 games in the UEFA Cup 2001–02 for FC Chernomorets Novorossiysk.
