= Andrei Kurdyumov =

Kazakhstani footballer

Personal information
- Full name: Andrei Petrovich Kurdyumov
- Date of birth: 23 March 1972 (age 54)
- Place of birth: Karaganda, Kazakh SSR
- Height: 1.90 m (6 ft 3 in)
- Positions: Midfielder; defender

Senior career*
Years	Team	Apps	(Gls)
1990	Shakhtyor Karaganda	2	(0)
1991	Olimpiya Alma-Ata	32	(3)
1992	CSKA Alma-Ata	17	(1)
1992	Montazhnik Alma-Ata	9	(3)
1993–1996	Shakhtyor Karagandy	126	(12)
1997	Zenit St. Petersburg	4	(0)
1998–1999	Chernomorets Novorossiysk	29	(3)

International career
1994–1996	Kazakhstan	10	(0)
- * Club domestic league appearances and goals

Andrei Petrovich Kurdyumov (born 23 March 1972) is a former Kazakhstani footballer.

== Career ==
Kurdyumov played for a number of teams based in Kazakh SSR, USSR and later Kazakhstan including Shakhtyor Karaganda, Olimpiya Alma-Ata, CSKA Alma-Ata and Montazhnik Alma-Ata, as well as for Zenit St. Petersburg and Chernomorets Novorossiysk of then Russian Top League.

== International ==
He was capped ten times for his national team between 1994 and 1996.
