= Olga Bielkova =

Ukrainian politician

- Ольга Бєлькова
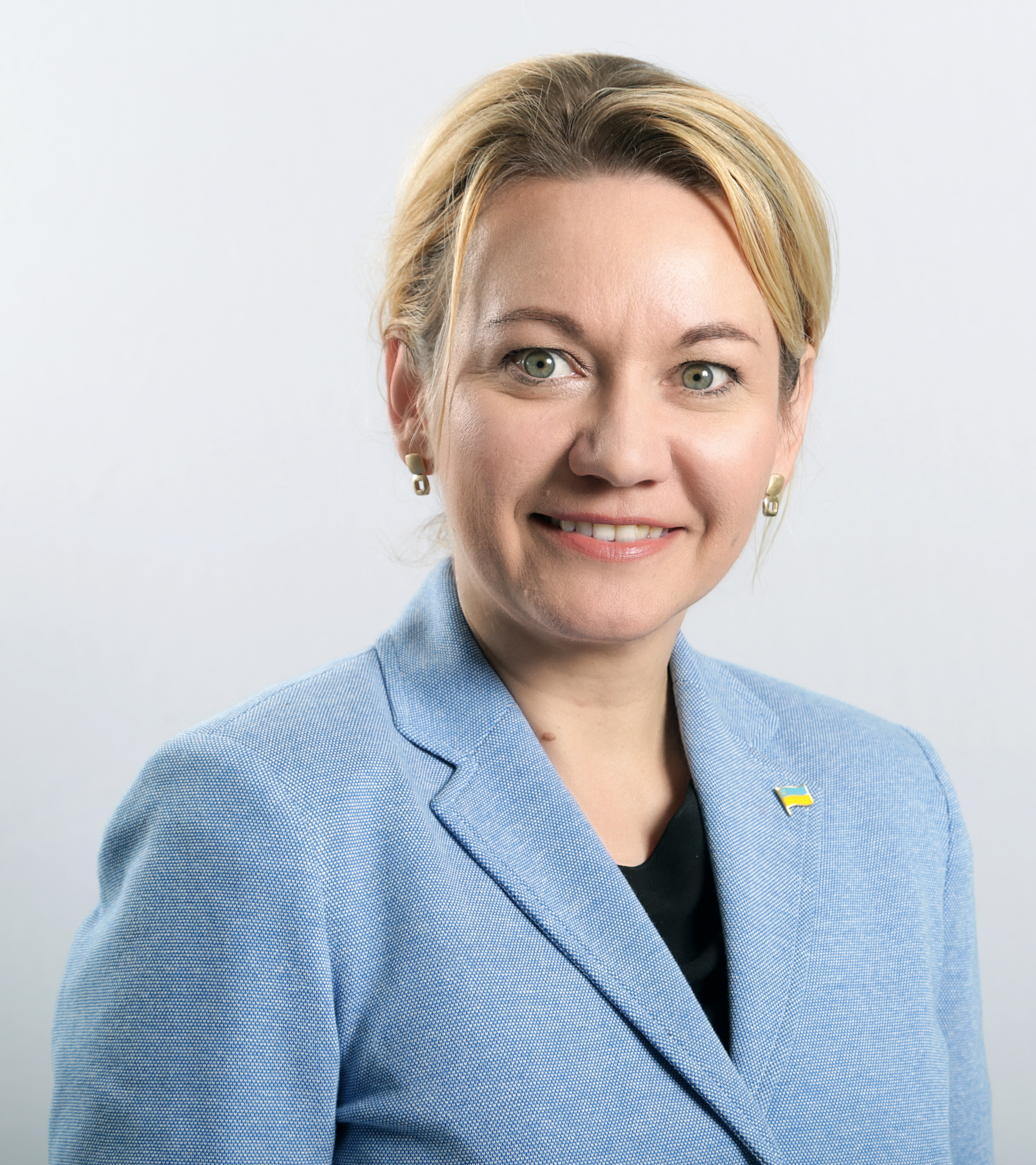
- Bielkova in 2019

People's Deputy of Ukraine
- In office 2012 – June 2020

Personal details
- Born: 16 June 1975 (age 51) Cherkasy, Ukrainian SSR, Soviet Union
- Party: Ukrainian Democratic Alliance for Reform
- Education: Harvard Kennedy School of Government; Kyiv National Taras Shevchenko University; Cherkassy State Engineering University
- Website: Official biography

Olga Valentynivna Bielkova (Ukrainian: Ольга Валентинівна Бєлькова; born 16 June 1975) is a Ukrainian politician who was a People's Deputy of Ukraine from 2012 to June 2020.

Bielkova also served as a Permanent Member of the Ukrainian Delegation to the Parliamentary Assembly of OSCE and NATO and a Member of the EITI (Extractive Industries Transparency Initiative) International Board, as well as a board member of The Parliamentary Network on the World Bank & International Monetary Fund.

== Education ==
Bielkova holds a master's degree of Public Administration from the Harvard Kennedy School of Government (2011), a law degree from the Taras Shevchenko National University of Kyiv (2001) and a degree in economics from the Cherkassy State Engineering University (1997).

== Career ==
Before her election in 2012, Bielkova was a managing partner at the Kyiv start-up accelerator EastLabs, focusing on sourcing new teams for funding and creating development programmes for portfolio companies. Earlier, she served on the executive management team of the Victor Pinchuk Foundation as director of international projects, including responsibility for the foundation’s scholarship initiative WorldWideStudies. The WorldWideStudies programme funds Ukrainian students to pursue master’s degrees at leading universities abroad.

On 12 December 2012, Bielkova took the parliamentary oath and joined the UDAR faction in the Verkhovna Rada.

From 2012 to 2014, she was a member of the Verkhovna Rada Committee on Finance and Banking and chaired the Subcommittee on the Functioning of Payment Systems and E-commerce; she also served as a member of the Special Control Commission on Privatisation, as recorded on the Verkhovna Rada official roster.

In the 2014 Ukrainian parliamentary election, Bielkova was again re-elected into parliament; this time after placing 47th on the electoral list of Petro Poroshenko Bloc and holds position of a Deputy Head of the Verkhovna Rada's Committee on Fuel and Energy Complex, Nuclear Policy and Nuclear Safety.

Bielkova took part in the July 2019 Ukrainian parliamentary election for the party "Fatherland". She was elected to parliament (as number 17 of the party's election list). On 18 June 2020 her parliamentary mandate was terminated at her own request.

== Legislative Activities ==
Legal initiatives to which Olga Bielkova is an initiator or a principal contributor, that became laws:

Draft Law of Ukraine "On natural gas market", which is a framework law for the sector that establishes qualitatively new rules to gas market. The aim is to create a transparent, competitive and effective gas market in line with the principles of the Third Energy Package: choice of the natural gas supplier and market pricing. One considerable achievement is the functional separation of transportation segments from gas extraction and sales, which increases competitiveness and introduces the clear rules for all market players. At the same time as the gas price hikes, the Cabinet of Ministers introduced a new system of targeted social assistance for the least protected groups of consumers.

Draft Law of Ukraine "On transparency of mining industry": allows to fulfill the requirements of the Extractive Industries Transparency Initiative – namely, to disclose the funds paid by the companies in the field of extraction and transportation of oil and gas to the budgets of different levels, and also the income received by the state from the activities of these companies as well as information on their activity and the license holders.

Draft Law of Ukraine "On amending the legislation of Ukraine on taxation of hydrocarbons production": provided taxation policy aimed on enhancing natural gas production by increasing volumes of gas produced domestically. This bill introduced specific fiscal rates for new wells (12% or 6% of rental payments depending on the depth of well) to promote an investment.

Draft Law of Ukraine "On reallocation of royalties from O&G to local communities": assigning 5% of royalties from oil&gas industry(approx. USD 2 billion per year) as an additional income of municipal budgets of the territories, where extraction takes place.

Draft Law of Ukraine "On deregulation in O&G industry": simplifies the land legislation and improves regulatory regime for oil & gas industry in order to eliminate the outdated and bureaucratic regulatory system (2–3 years to get all necessary permissions) and boost development of new wells.

Draft Law of Ukraine "On the National Energy Regulatory Commission of Ukraine": reinforces and unifies the regulation of all natural monopolies in one regulator that controls pricing of services, ensuring a balance of interests between producers, consumers, and state. It should guarantee reliable supply to consumers at fair prices, while making sure that the natural monopolies can make sufficient profits to be able to develop.

== Publications ==
=== In Ukrainian ===
- Що потрібно для розвитку нафтогазовидобувної галузі, лютий 2017, Новое время
- "Ротація+"? або Чому не працює закон про енергорегулятора, жовтень 2017
- Енергетичний бік санкцій: доля Nord Stream-2 залежить від українських реформ, вересень 2017, Європейська правда
- Яке майбутнє чекає на Укргазвидобування, жовтень 2016, Новое время
- Навіки разом. Як зберегти український транзит газу в Європу, червень 2017, Focus.ua
- Північний потік-2: у пошуках конструктивного рішення, листопад 2016, Новое время
- Як розпоряджатися ресурсами країни. Досвід Норвегії, листопад 2016, Новое время
- Дорожня карта енергетичних реформ 2016, січень 2016
- Ініціатива прозорості добувних галузей: що це означає для україни?, грудень 2015
- 9 нетарифных причин снизить ренту для добывающих компаний в Украине, листопад 2015
- Навіщо Держгеонадра відкликають ліцензії навіть у державної "Укргазвидобування"?, листопад 2017, Дзеркало тижня
- Газовий сектор: патологічна неповноцінність чи шанс для розвитку?, Травень 2015, Економічна правда
- Українські реалії 2015: гарне, погане та незворотнє
- Ініціатива прозорості добувних галузей: що це означає для України?
- Навіщо нам потрібен Закон про Енергорегулятор?
- Мій Elevator Pitch Віце-Президенту Байдену
- Який фіскальний режим збільшить видобуток газу?
- Навіщо Держгеонадра відкликають ліцензії навіть у державної «Укргазвидобування»?
- Інтерв'ю виданню «Грушевського,5»
- Інтерв'ю виданню AIN.ua
- Інтерв'ю для Inspirations for Breakfast

=== In English ===
- European Green Deal for Ukraine: The time to launch is now (Jan 2023)
- How Ukraine’s renewable gas potential can help European energy security (Oct 2022)
- Defending Ukraine on the energy front (Feb 2022)
- Nord Stream 2: Germany must listen to Ukrainian security concern s (Nov 2021)
- Nord Stream 2 will test new German government’s European solidarity (Nov 2021)
- US, Ukrainian, and European Energy Security: How Do We Defend It? (Jan 2021)
- Russia’s Trojan stream under the Black Sea (Dec 2020)
- Ukraine: The Good, The Bad, and The Irreversible
- In Ukraine's Energy Sector, Failure is Not an Option
- Three priorities for Ukraine's energy agenda
- When Politicians Struggle to Find a Pathway to Peace, Business Must Step It Up
- Economic Success of Ukraine: A Shared Responsibility
- A Russian Pipeline of Deception: Nord Stream 2,
- Here’s Why Nord Stream 2 Isn’t the Only Game in Town
- From Holodomor to Maidan: How the Kremlin 'Brotherly Love' Cost Ukraine Millions of Lives (Jan 2015)
- Now’s the Time to Block Nord Stream 2 and Step Up Ukraine’s Energy Diplomacy
- Transparency strengthens Ukraine’s energy security
- A road map for energy reforms in 2016
