= Dmitri Radyukin =

Russian professional football coach (born 1969)

Personal information
- Full name: Dmitri Veniaminovich Radyukin
- Date of birth: May 16, 1969 (age 57)

Team information
- Current team: FC Gornyak Uchaly (manager)

Managerial career
- Years: Team
- 2002: FC Chkalovets-Olimpik Novosibirsk (assistant)
- 2003–2006: FC Sibir Novosibirsk (assistant)
- 2006: FC Sibir Novosibirsk (caretaker)
- 2007: FC Sibir Novosibirsk (director)
- 2009: FC Gornyak Uchaly
- 2010: FC Sibir Novosibirsk (assistant)
- 2011: FC Sibir Novosibirsk (caretaker)
- 2012: FC Gornyak Uchaly

Dmitri Veniaminovich Radyukin (Russian: Дмитрий Вениаминович Радюкин; born May 16, 1969) is a Russian professional football coach. Currently, he manages FC Gornyak Uchaly.

Radyukin managed Russian National Football League side FC Sibir Novosibirsk for 30 matches, winning 13, from May 2011 to December 2011.
