= FC Gornyak Uchaly =

- Full name: Football Club Gornyak Uchaly
- Founded: 2005
- Dissolved: 2013
- Ground: Gornyak Stadium
- Chairman: Zakariya Gubadullin
- Manager: Dmitri Radyukin
- League: Russian Second Division, Zone Ural-Povolzhye
- 2012–13: 9th
Home colours	Away colours

FC Gornyak Uchaly (Russian: ФК «Горняк» Учалы) is a Russian football club from Uchaly.

== History ==
In 2005, playing at the regional level, the team was the second in the Bashkortostan championship and won the Bashkortostan cup. In 2007, the team won Ural and West Siberia zonal tournament of the Russian Amateur Football League. From 2008 to 2013, (five seasons) they played in the Russian Second Division, Ural-Povolzhye zone (third level in the Russian league system).

The team's best league result is the 2nd place in "Ural-Povolzhye" in 2009; in 2010 they surprisingly defeated FC Lokomotiv Moscow (1–0) in the cup game (and then lost to FC Alania Vladikavkaz in penalty shootout only). The club withdrew from Second Division in 2013.
