= Sergei Dymov =

Russian footballer

Personal information
- Full name: Sergei Vyacheslavovich Dymov
- Date of birth: 11 July 1975 (age 51)
- Place of birth: Bystrogorsky, Rostov Oblast, Russian SFSR
- Height: 1.76 m (5 ft 9 1/2 in)
- Position: Defender

Senior career*
Years	Team	Apps	(Gls)
1993	FC Fakel Voronezh	4	(0)
1995–1996	FC APK Morozovsk	57	(3)
1998	FC SKA Rostov-on-Don (amateur)		
1999–2004	FC SKA Rostov-on-Don	191	(2)
2005	FC Lokomotiv-NN Nizhny Novgorod	31	(0)
2006–2011	FC Gazovik Orenburg	129	(0)
- * Club domestic league appearances and goals

Sergei Vyacheslavovich Dymov (Russian: Серге́й Вячеславович Дымов; born 11 July 1975) is a former Russian professional football player.

== Club career ==
He made his Russian Football National League debut for FC Fakel Voronezh on 22 April 1993 in a game against FC Torpedo Taganrog. He played 3 seasons in the FNL for Fakel, FC SKA Rostov-on-Don and FC Gazovik Orenburg.
