= Aleksandr Gorbachyov (footballer, born 1970) =

Russian footballer and coach

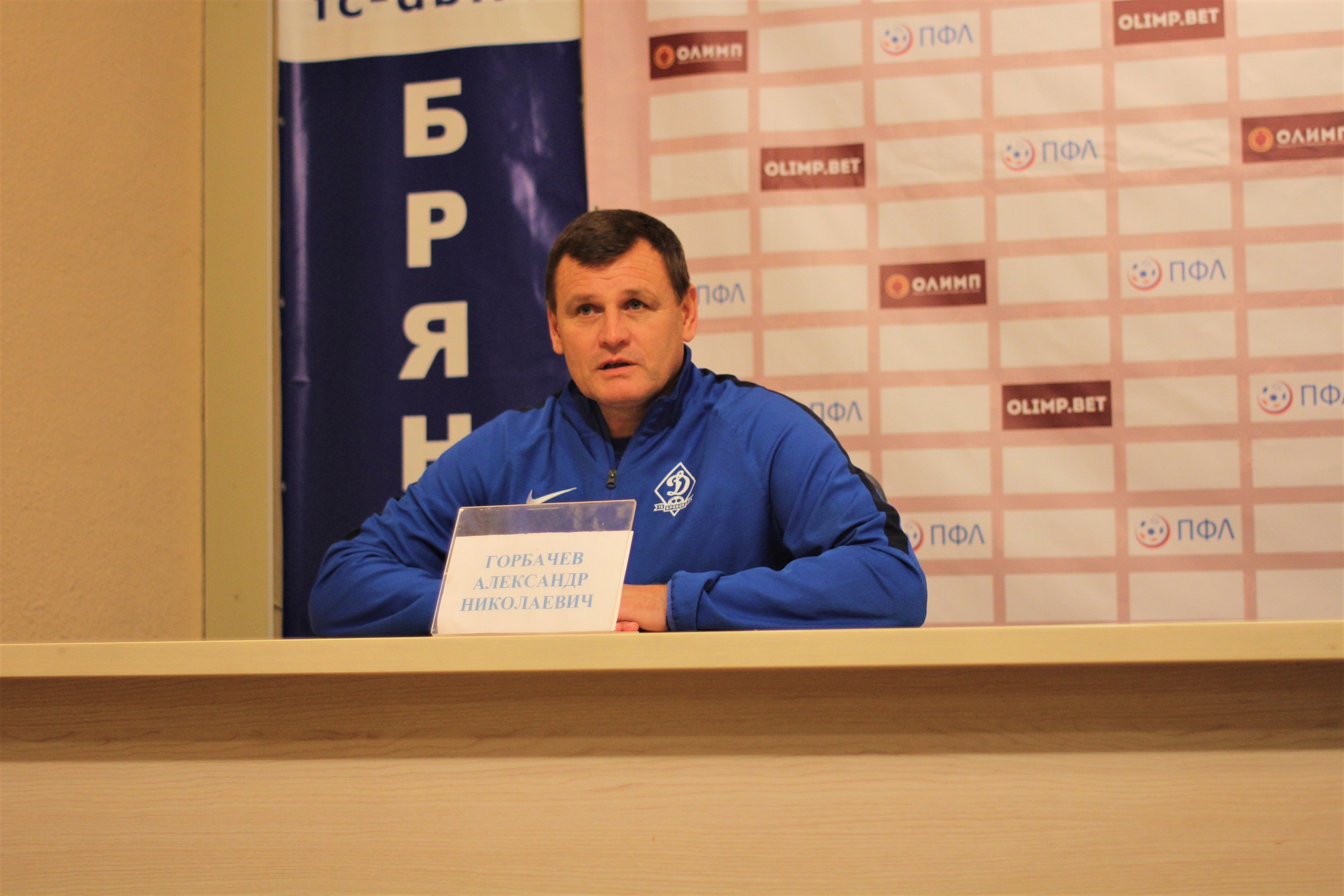

Personal information
- Full name: Aleksandr Nikolayevich Gorbachyov
- Date of birth: 22 November 1970 (age 55)
- Place of birth: Izobilny, Stavropol Krai, Russian SFSR
- Height: 1.83 m (6 ft 0 in)
- Position: Defender

Team information
- Current team: Krylia Sovetov Samara (assistant coach)

Youth career
- DYuSSh Izobilny

Senior career*
Years	Team	Apps	(Gls)
1988–1989	Signal Izobilny	61	(2)
1990–1991	CSKA-2 Moscow	29	(1)
1991	KAMAZ Naberezhnye Chelny	17	(4)
1992	Asmaral Kislovodsk	15	(0)
1992–1994	Dynamo Stavropol	59	(5)
1994–1995	KAMAZ Naberezhnye Chelny	36	(1)
1996–1997	Dynamo Stavropol	37	(2)
1997–1999	Baltika Kaliningrad	59	(0)
2000	Fakel Voronezh	17	(1)
2001	Uralan Elista	3	(0)
2001	Metallurg Krasnoyarsk	13	(0)
2002–2005	Baltika Kaliningrad	124	(7)
2006	SKA Rostov-on-Don	0	(0)

Managerial career
- 2007: Baltika-2 Kaliningrad (caretaker)
- 2009: Dynamo Bryansk (assistant)
- 2010: Tranzit
- 2011–2015: Baltika Kaliningrad (assistant)
- 2011: Baltika Kaliningrad (caretaker)
- 2015: SKA-Energiya Khabarovsk
- 2016: Baltika Kaliningrad
- 2018–2021: Dynamo Bryansk
- 2022–2023: Torpedo Vladimir
- 2024–2026: Baltika Kaliningrad (assistant)
- 2026–: Krylia Sovetov Samara (assistant)
- * Club domestic league appearances and goals

Aleksandr Nikolayevich Gorbachyov (Russian: Александр Николаевич Горбачёв; born 22 November 1970) is a Russian professional football coach and a former player who is an assistant coach with Krylia Sovetov Samara. He is not related to Mikhail Gorbachev.

== Club career ==
He made his professional debut in the Soviet Second League in 1989 for FC Signal Izobilny. He played four games in the UEFA Intertoto Cup 1998 for FC Baltika Kaliningrad.

== Coaching career ==
On 15 January 2021, he was banned from any football activity for a year after fielding 3 players who tested positive for COVID-19 in a league game and submitting fake negative test results to the league.
