= Maksim Shevchenko (footballer, born 1980) =

Kazakhstani-Russian footballer and manager

Personal information
- Full name: Maksim Igorevich Shevchenko
- Date of birth: 27 March 1980 (age 46)
- Place of birth: Almaty, Kazakh SSR
- Height: 1.77 m (5 ft 10 in)
- Position: Midfielder

Team information
- Current team: Lokomotiv Moscow (academy)

Senior career*
Years	Team	Apps	(Gls)
1997–1998	FC KAMAZ-Chally Naberezhnye Chelny	37	(5)
1999	FC Neftekhimik Nizhnekamsk	13	(1)
1999–2000	FC Chernomorets Novorossiysk	12	(0)
2000	FC Nosta Novotroitsk	14	(2)
2001	FC Chernomorets Novorossiysk	22	(0)
2002–2003	FC Lada Togliatti	25	(1)
2003–2004	FC Tobol	15	(2)
2004	FC Zhetysu	17	(2)
2005–2006	FC Shakhter Karagandy	22	(0)
2006–2007	FC Yesil Bogatyr Petropavlovsk	35	(2)
2008	FC Kairat	6	(1)
2009–2010	FC Ile-Saulet	23	(7)

International career
2000–2005	Kazakhstan	11	(3)

Managerial career
- 2011: Ile-Saulet (assistant)
- 2012–2014: Kairat-Akademiya (assistant)
- 2015: Kairat (assistant)
- 2015–2017: Kairat 2
- 2018–2019: FC Ruzayevka
- 2019–2021: Zenit Izhevsk (sporting director)
- 2019: Torpedo Izhevsk
- 2021–: Lokomotiv Moscow (academy deputy director)
- * Club domestic league appearances and goals

Maksim Igorevich Shevchenko (Russian: Максим Игоревич Шевченко; born 27 March 1980) is a Kazakhstani professional football coach and former player. He works as a deputy director at the academy of the Russian club Lokomotiv Moscow. He also holds Russian citizenship.

== Club career ==
Shevchenko made his professional debut in the Russian Premier League in 1997 for KAMAZ-Chally Naberezhnye Chelny. He played as a midfielder. Shevchenko played 2 games in the 2001–02 UEFA Cup for Chernomorets Novorossiysk.

== Career statistics ==
=== International goals ===
#	Date	Venue	Opponent	Score	Result	Competition
1.	21 April 2001	Central Stadium, Almaty, Kazakhstan	Nepal	4–0	Win	2002 World Cup qual.
2.	17 April 2002	Ventspils Stadions, Ventspils, Latvia	Latvia	2–1	Loss	Friendly
3.	12 February 2003	Ta' Qali National Stadium, Attard, Malta	Malta	2–2	Draw	Friendly
Correct as of 13 January 2017
