= Galimdzhan Khayrulin =

Russian footballer and manager

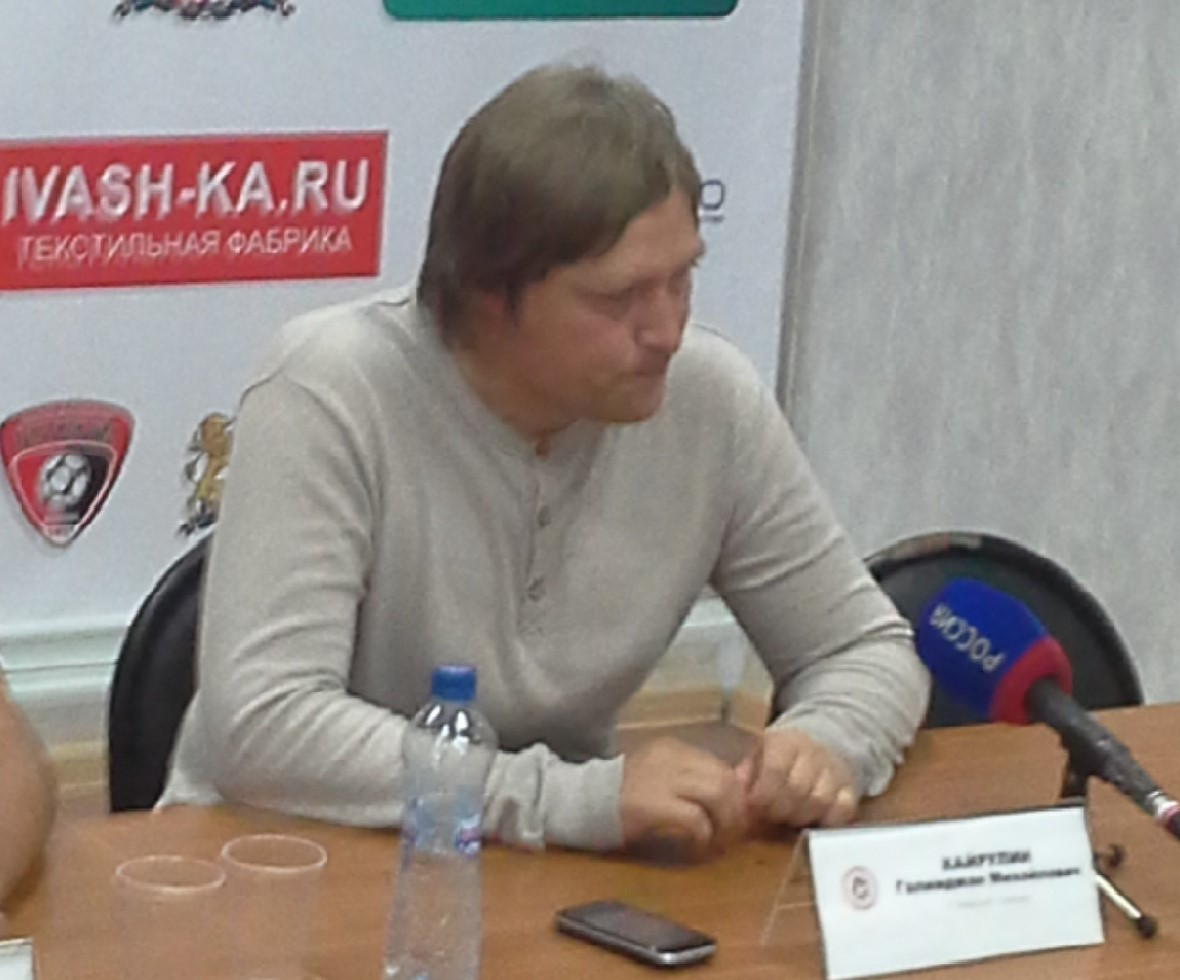

Personal information
- Full name: Galimdzhan Mikhailovich Khayrulin
- Date of birth: 27 May 1974 (age 52)
- Position: Midfielder

Team information
- Current team: FC Shinnik Yaroslavl (general director)

Youth career
- Yaroslavets Yaroslavl

Senior career*
Years	Team	Apps	(Gls)
1992	FC Khitrye Lisy Orekhovo-Zuyevo	23	(0)
1993	FC Spartak Kostroma	20	(0)
1994–1995	FC Neftyanik Yaroslavl	30	(0)
1995–2000	Świt Nowy Dwór Mazowiecki		
2000–2002	SHB Đà Nẵng F.C.		

Managerial career
- 2001–2002: SHB Đà Nẵng F.C.
- 2002–2006: FC Shinnik Yaroslavl (academy)
- 2007: FC Shinnik-2-Vodokanal Yaroslavl
- 2008: FC Shinnik Yaroslavl (assistant)
- 2009: FC Shinnik-Uglich Yaroslavl
- 2010–2011: FC Shinnik Yaroslavl (assistant)
- 2011: FC Shinnik Yaroslavl (caretaker)
- 2011–2012: FC Shinnik Yaroslavl (assistant)
- 2013–2015: FC Znamya Truda Orekhovo-Zuyevo
- 2015: FC Spartak Kostroma
- 2024–: FC Shinnik Yaroslavl (general director)
- * Club domestic league appearances and goals

Galimdzhan Mikhailovich Khayrulin (Russian: Галимджан Михайлович Хайрулин; last name also spelled Khayrullin according to some sources; born 27 May 1974) is a Russian football manager and a former player. He is the general director of FC Shinnik Yaroslavl.
