= Igor Protasov =

Russian footballer and coach

Personal information
- Full name: Igor Olegovich Protasov
- Date of birth: 16 January 1964 (age 62)
- Height: 1.75 m (5 ft 9 in)
- Position: Striker

Senior career*
Years	Team	Apps	(Gls)
1984–1993	FC SKA Khabarovsk	184	(47)
1994	FC Luch Vladivostok	40	(9)
1995–1999	FC SKA Khabarovsk	93	(12)

Managerial career
- 2006–2007: FC SKA-Energiya Khabarovsk (assistant)
- 2010: FC SKA-Energiya Khabarovsk (assistant)
- 2011: FC SKA-Energiya Khabarovsk
- 2022: FC SKA-Khabarovsk-2 (caretaker)
- * Club domestic league appearances and goals

Igor Olegovich Protasov (Russian: Игорь Олегович Протасов; born 16 January 1964) is a Russian professional football coach and a former player.

== Club career ==
He made his Russian Football National League debut for FC SKA Khabarovsk on 6 May 1992 in a game against FC Amur Blagoveshchensk. He played 3 seasons in the FNL for SKA and FC Luch Vladivostok.
