= Gulshan-e-Iqbal Park =

Public recreational area in Lahore, Pakistan

Coordinates: 31.513°N 74.289°E

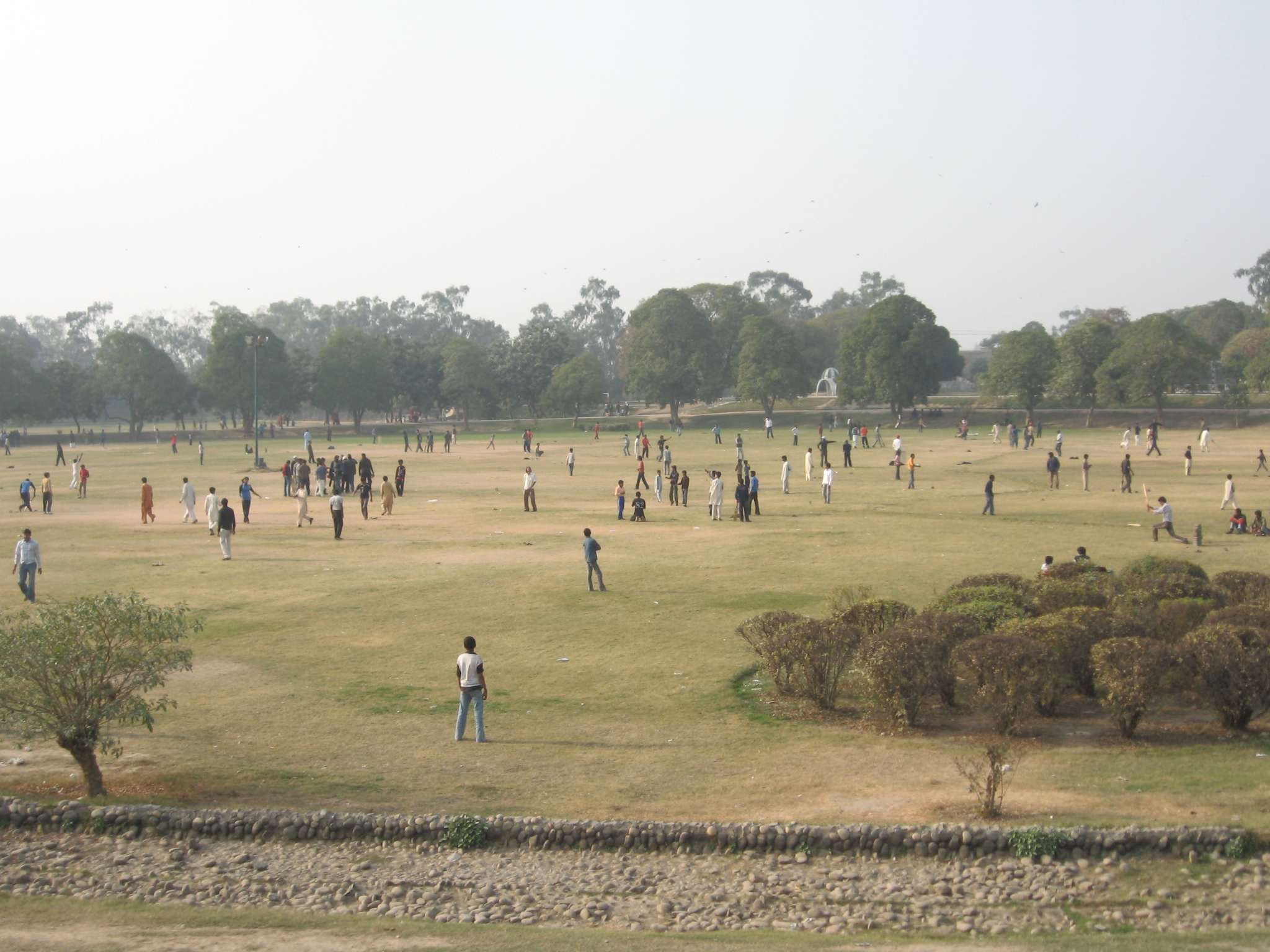
Gulshan-e-Iqbal Park, Lahore

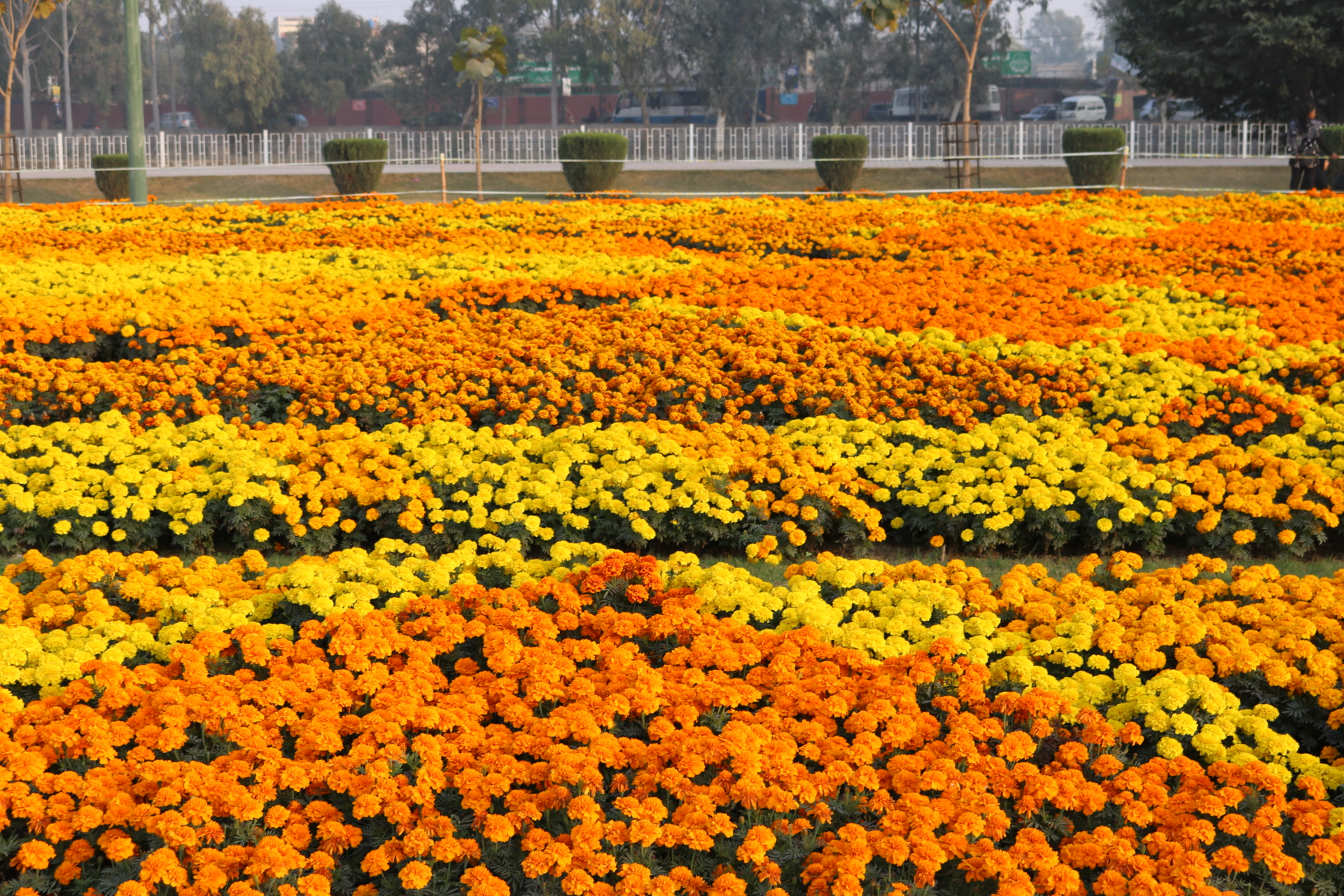
Flower Exhibition at Gulshan Iqbal Park

The Gulshan-e-Iqbal Park (Urdu: گلشن-اقبال پارک) is a large park and recreational space in Lahore, Pakistan. With an area of over 0.27 square kilometres (67 acres), the park is one of the largest in the city. It is situated in the suburban locality of Allama Iqbal Town. The name Gulshan-e-Iqbal is literally translated as "the garden of Iqbal," referring to Iqbal, the national poet of Pakistan. It has many recreational rides for children and adults making it a popular venue for families, especially on weekends and other holidays. It also features a vast artificial lake and a mini-zoo.

The park had some issues regarding security. The park is well maintained by the local council, with new playing areas and rides being added recently due to increased public interest.

== Incidents ==
- In the 1980s, a man drowned while trying to jump from one recreational-boat to the other.
- On 27 March 2016, a bomb blast occurred in the parking area of Gulshan-e-Iqbal Park, near the main gate a few feet away from recreational rides, killing at least 72 and injuring over 300 people.

== See also ==
- List of parks and gardens in Lahore
- List of parks and gardens in Pakistan
- List of parks and gardens in Karachi
