= Konstantin Belkov =

Russian professional footballer

Personal information
- Full name: Konstantin Viktorovich Belkov
- Date of birth: 23 February 1980 (age 46)
- Place of birth: Novorossiysk, Russia
- Height: 1.78 m (5 ft 10 in)
- Position: Defender

Youth career
- FC Chernomorets Novorossiysk

Senior career*
Years	Team	Apps	(Gls)
1997–2000	FC Chernomorets Novorossiysk	23	(1)
2000	FC Chernomorets-2 Novorossiysk	7	(0)
2000	FC Nosta Novotroitsk	18	(2)
2001–2011	FC Chernomorets Novorossiysk	71	(3)
2012	FC Olimpia Gelendzhik	5	(0)
- * Club domestic league appearances and goals

Konstantin Viktorovich Belkov (Russian: Константин Викторович Бельков; born 23 February 1980) is a Russian former professional footballer.

== Club career ==
He made his debut in the Russian Premier League in 1997 for FC Chernomorets Novorossiysk. He played one game in the UEFA Cup 2001–02 for FC Chernomorets Novorossiysk.
