= FC Chernomorets Novorossiysk =

Russian football club

Chernomorets
- Full name: Football Club; Chernomorets
- Nickname: Moryaki (Sailors)
- Founded: 1907; 119 years ago
- Ground: Central Stadium, Novorossiysk
- Capacity: 12,500
- General director: Maxim Ponomarev
- Manager: Eduard Sarkisov
- League: Russian Second League; Division B
- 2025–26: Russian First League, 16th of 18 (relegated)
- Website: www.fccn.pro
Home colours	Away colours	Third colours

FC Chernomorets Novorossiysk (Russian: ФК "Черноморец" Новороссийск) is the oldest Russian association football club based in Novorossiysk. It is not currently active in national competitions and is expected to join the fourth-tier Russian Second League Division B for the 2027 season.

== History ==
The club was founded as a part of the football section in the Olympia sports club (Novorossiysk) in the summer of 1907, and on September 30, 1907, the first international match between the Olympia club and the sailors of a merchant ship from England took place, the match ended in a draw 2:2. The Club changed name for Cement Novorossiysk in 1960 and was known by its name in 1960–1969 and 1978–1991. In 1970–1977, the clubs was called Trud Novorossiysk, in 1992–1993 Gekris Novorossiysk, and in 2005 FC Novorossiysk. Chernomorets is Russian for "a sailor from the Black Sea".

The club played in class B of the Soviet football in 1960–1970. After this they did not participate in Soviet championships until 1978, when they entered the Second League. They played there until the dissolution of USSR, and in 1992 were entitled to enter the Russian First Division. They spent three years there. After a third place in 1992 they won their regional group in 1993, but did not succeed in the promotion-relegation tournament. A victory in the First Division in 1994 brought them automatic promotion.

Chernomorets stayed in the Top Division from 1995 to 2001. Their best result was sixth position in 1997 and 2000. The latter entitled them to a place in the UEFA Cup, where they were knocked out in the first round by Valencia.

In 2002 Chernomorets won promotion straight back, but were relegated again in 2003. After the 2004 season in the First Division, Chernomorets were denied a professional licence. The club was reorganized, renamed FC Novorossiysk and entered the Amateur Football League for the 2005 season. In the course of the season the team was renamed Chernomorets again. Chernomorets finished first in the South zone and went on to win the final tournament, becoming amateur champions of Russia. Chernomorets finished third in the South zone of Russian Second Division in the 2006 season. They finally finished first and were promoted to Russian First Division for the 2007 season. It stayed 2 seasons in First Division and relegated back to Second Division in 2009. They were promoted to the First Division again after winning the Second Division zone in 2010. It was relegated back from the First Division after one year on that level.

On 28 May 2023, the club secured promotion to the Russian First League.

In the 2024–25 season, Chernomorets finished 3rd in the First League, making them eligible for the Russian Premier League promotion play-offs. However, the club was not issued the 2025–26 RPL license as their stadium did not pass Premier League requirements (Chernomorets also could not come to an agreement with potential replacement stadiums such as Fisht Stadium) and remained in the First League. At the end of the next season, Chernomorets was relegated to Russian Second League. On 11 June 2026, the club announced they were not able to obtain the license for the Division A of the Second League, instead they will enter the Division B (fourth tier) in March 2027.

== Reserve team ==
Chernomorets' reserve team played professionally in the Russian Second Division (in 2000 as FC Chernomorets-2 Novorossiysk) and the Russian Third League (in 1996 as FC Chernomorets-d Novorossiysk).

== Notable players ==
Had international caps for their respective countries. Players whose name is listed in bold represented their countries while playing for Chernomorets/Tsement/Gekris.

USSR/Russia

- (Soviet Union) Boris Pozdnyakov
- (Russia) Aleksei Berezutski
- (Russia) Vladimir But
- (Russia) Sergei Filippenkov
- (Russia) Nikolay Komlichenko
- (Russia) Oleg Kuzmin
- (Russia) Denis Popov
- (Russia) Oleg Teryokhin
- (Russia) Yevgeni Varlamov

Europe

- (Armenia) Armen Adamyan
- (Armenia) Manuk Kakosyan
- (Armenia) Tigran Petrosyan
- (Armenia) Aramais Yepiskoposyan
- (Azerbaijan) **Lev Mayorov**
- (Belarus) **Vyacheslav Geraschenko**
- (Belarus) Artem Kontsevoy
- (Belarus) Konstantin Kovalenko

- (Belarus) Vitali Lanko
- (Belarus) Mikhail Markhel
- (Belarus) Andrei Sosnitskiy
- (Belarus) Aleksandr Vyazhevich
- (Georgia (country)) Besik Beradze
- (Georgia (country)) Davit Janashia
- (Georgia (country)) Klimenti Tsitaishvili
- (Kazakhstan) **Vadim Egoshkin**
- (Kazakhstan) Andrei Kurdyumov
- (Kazakhstan) Maksim Nizovtsev
- (Kazakhstan) **Maksim Shevchenko**
- (Kazakhstan) Andrey Shkurin
- (Latvia) Jurijs Ševļakovs
- (Lithuania) **Nerijus Radžius**
- (Moldova) Serghei Belous
- (Moldova) **Serghei Clescenco**
- (Moldova) Alexandr Covalenco
- (Moldova) Adrian Sosnovschi
- (Ukraine) Oleksiy Antyukhyn
- (Ukraine) Serhiy Bezhenar

- (Ukraine) Yuriy Hrytsyna
- (Ukraine) Oleksandr Kyryukhin
- (Ukraine) **Maksym Levytskyi**
- (Ukraine) **Oleksandr Pryzetko**
- (Ukraine) **Serhiy Snytko**
- (Ukraine) **Oleksandr Svystunov**
- (Ukraine) Mykola Volosyanko

Africa

- (Cameroon) David Embé
- (Cameroon) **Alphonse Tchami**
- (Cameroon) Jerry-Christian Tchuissé
- (Ghana) Baba Adamu

South America

- (Brazil) Flávio

Asia

- (Uzbekistan) **Jafar Irismetov**
- (Uzbekistan) **Eduard Momotov**
- (Uzbekistan) Gennadiy Sharipov

== See also ==
- FC Chernomorets Novorossiysk in Europe
