= 2015–16 FC Krasnodar season =

FC Krasnodar
2015–16 season
- Chairman: Sergey Galitsky
- Manager: Oleg Kononov
- Stadium: Kuban Stadium
- Russian Premier League: 4th
- Russian Cup: Semi-final (vs. CSKA Moscow)
- Europa League: Round of 32 (vs. Sparta Prague)
- Top goalscorer: League: Fyodor Smolov (20); All: Fyodor Smolov (24)
Home colours	Away colours

The 2015–16 FC Krasnodar season was the 5th successive season that the club played in the Russian Premier League, the highest tier of association football in Russia. Krasnodar also took part in the Russian Cup and the Europa League, entering at the Third qualifying round.

== Squad ==
As of 18 February 2016

Note: Flags indicate national team as defined under FIFA eligibility rules; some limited exceptions apply. Players may hold more than one non-FIFA nationality.

No.	Pos.	Nation	Player
1	GK	RUS	Stanislav Kritsyuk (loan from Braga)
3	DF	NOR	Stefan Strandberg
4	MF	RUS	Dmitri Torbinski
6	DF	SWE	Andreas Granqvist (captain)
7	MF	RUS	Pavel Mamayev
8	MF	RUS	Yury Gazinsky
9	FW	BRA	Ari
10	MF	UZB	Odil Ahmedov
11	MF	RUS	Vyacheslav Podberyozkin
14	FW	BRA	Wánderson
15	DF	RUS	Nikolay Markov

No.	Pos.	Nation	Player
17	DF	RUS	Vitali Kaleshin
18	MF	RUS	Vladimir Bystrov
21	MF	COL	Ricardo Laborde
22	MF	BRA	Joãozinho
27	DF	ISL	Ragnar Sigurðsson
31	GK	UKR	Andriy Dykan
33	MF	URU	Mauricio Pereyra
77	MF	BFA	Charles Kaboré
88	GK	RUS	Andrei Sinitsyn
90	FW	RUS	Fyodor Smolov
98	MF	RUS	Sergei Petrov

=== Out on loan ===
Note: Flags indicate national team as defined under FIFA eligibility rules; some limited exceptions apply. Players may hold more than one non-FIFA nationality.

No. / Pos. / Nation / Player; 5 / DF / POL / Artur Jędrzejczyk (at Legia Warsaw)	No. / Pos. / Nation / Player; — / MF / RUS / Oleg Lanin (at FC Baltika Kaliningrad until 30 June 2016)

=== Reserve squad ===
Note: Flags indicate national team as defined under FIFA eligibility rules; some limited exceptions apply. Players may hold more than one non-FIFA nationality.

No.	Pos.	Nation	Player
38	MF	CIV	Kouassi Eboue
39	GK	RUS	Matvei Safonov
41	DF	RUS	Aleksei Tatayev
43	MF	RUS	Daur Kvekveskiri
45	DF	RUS	Igor Paradin
46	DF	RUS	Vitali Stezhko
47	MF	RUS	Ilya Zhigulyov
48	DF	RUS	Aleksandr Marchenko
50	DF	RUS	Artyom Golubev
51	GK	RUS	Denis Kavlinov
52	GK	RUS	Yevgeni Latyshonok
53	FW	RUS	Pavel Marushko
56	FW	RUS	Ilya Belous
57	DF	RUS	Ilya Nasonkin
58	MF	RUS	Aleksandr Sergeyev
59	DF	RUS	Nikita Katayev
61	GK	RUS	Dmitri Goryachkin
62	MF	RUS	Aleks Matsukatov
63	FW	RUS	Nikolay Komlichenko
65	MF	RUS	Inal Cherchesov
66	GK	RUS	Denis Adamov
68	FW	RUS	Andrei Batyutin
69	FW	RUS	Denis Vasenin
70	MF	RUS	Daniil Utkin
71	FW	RUS	Aleksandr Butenko

No.	Pos.	Nation	Player
72	DF	RUS	Daniil Bochkaryov
73	FW	RUS	Roman Razzhivin
74	MF	RUS	Daniil Fomin
75	FW	RUS	Levon Bayramyan
76	FW	RUS	Abdulmuslim Asilderov
78	FW	RUS	Dmitri Vorobyov
79	DF	RUS	Batraz Gurtsiyev
80	FW	RUS	Vladislav Sklyar
81	DF	RUS	Yevgeni Nesterenko
82	DF	RUS	Sergei Borisov
83	DF	RUS	Maksim Starkov
84	GK	RUS	Anton Fedyushkin
85	FW	RUS	Ivan Ignatyev
86	DF	RUS	Vasili Cherov
87	DF	RUS	Arutyun Grigoryan
89	DF	RUS	Aleksey Shishkin
91	DF	RUS	Leo Goglichidze
92	MF	RUS	Ivan Takhmazov
93	FW	RUS	Magomed-Shapi Suleymanov
94	DF	RUS	Yevgeni Nazarov
95	FW	RUS	Aslan Vershinin
96	MF	RUS	Ilya Borisov
97	FW	RUS	Nurik Gadzhiyev
99	FW	RUS	Vladislav Bragin

== Transfers ==
=== Summer ===
In: Note: Flags indicate national team as defined under FIFA eligibility rules; some limited exceptions apply. Players may hold more than one non-FIFA nationality.

No.	Pos.	Nation	Player
3	DF	NOR	Stefan Strandberg (from (Norway) Rosenborg)
4	MF	RUS	Dmitri Torbinski (from (Russia) FC Rostov)
15	DF	RUS	Nikolay Markov (end of loan to (Russia) Ural Sverdlovsk Oblast)
39	GK	RUS	Matvei Safonov
40	DF	RUS	Elgyun Ulukhanov (from (Russia) CSKA Moscow)
42	DF	RUS	Konstantin Zhuzhgov
45	DF	RUS	Igor Paradin
48	DF	RUS	Aleksandr Marchenko (end of loan at (Russia) Chernomorets Novorossiysk)
50	DF	RUS	Artyom Golubev
54	MF	RUS	Vyacheslav Yakimov
57	DF	RUS	Ilya Nasonkin
62	MF	RUS	Aleks Matsukatov
63	FW	RUS	Nikolay Komlichenko (end of loan at (Russia) Chernomorets Novorossiysk)
70	MF	RUS	Daniil Utkin
71	FW	RUS	Aleksandr Butenko
73	FW	RUS	Roman Razzhivin
76	FW	RUS	Abdulmuslim Asilderov
77	MF	BFA	Charles Kaboré (on loan from (Russia) Kuban Krasnodar)
82	DF	RUS	Sergei Borodin
85	FW	RUS	Ivan Ignatyev
90	FW	RUS	Fyodor Smolov (from (Russia) Dynamo Moscow)
93	FW	RUS	Magomed-Shapi Suleymanov
94	DF	RUS	Yevgeni Nazarov (from (Russia) Viktor Ponedelnik Academy Rostov-on-Don)

Out: Note: Flags indicate national team as defined under FIFA eligibility rules; some limited exceptions apply. Players may hold more than one non-FIFA nationality.

No.	Pos.	Nation	Player
4	DF	BLR	Alyaksandr Martynovich (on loan to (Russia) Ural Sverdlovsk Oblast)
11	MF	RUS	Marat Izmailov (end of loan from (Portugal) Porto)
15	MF	RUS	Roman Shirokov (end of loan from (Russia) Spartak Moscow)
20	MF	RUS	Ruslan Adzhindzhal (retired)
25	MF	RUS	Yevgeni Shipitsin (to (Russia) Mordovia Saransk)
37	DF	RUS	Aleksandr Luzin
42	DF	RUS	Dmitri Novak (to (Russia) Sibir-2 Novosibirsk)
42	DF	RUS	Konstantin Zhuzhgov
45	GK	RUS	Vsevolod Yermakov
57	MF	RUS	Nikita Akimov
58	FW	RUS	Ilya Yurchenko (to (Russia) Lokomotiv Liski)
62	MF	RUS	Ruslan Rzayev
63	MF	RUS	Vladislav Pavlyuchenko
64	MF	RUS	Oleg Lanin (on loan to (Russia) Baltika Kaliningrad)
65	DF	RUS	Andrei Gamalyan
71	DF	RUS	Dmitri Kuzmichyov
73	GK	RUS	Stanislav Antipin (to (Russia) MITOS Novocherkassk)
76	MF	RUS	Aleksandr Ageyev (on loan to (Russia) Energomash Belgorod)
82	MF	RUS	Nikita Rulevsky
93	DF	RUS	Anton Maltsev
—	DF	RUS	Sergei Khmelevskoy (to (Russia) MITOS Novocherkassk, previously on loan)
—	MF	RUS	Kirill Morozov (to (Russia) Zenit-Izhevsk, previously on loan to (Russia) Afips Afipsky)
—	MF	RUS	Aleksei Pomerko (to (Russia) Krylia Sovetov Samara, previously on loan)
—	FW	RUS	Ruslan Bolov (to (Russia) Volgar Astrakhan, previously on loan)
—	FW	RUS	Nikita Burmistrov (on loan to (Russia) Ural Sverdlovsk Oblast, previously on loan at (Russia) Tom Tomsk)

=== Winter ===
In: Note: Flags indicate national team as defined under FIFA eligibility rules; some limited exceptions apply. Players may hold more than one non-FIFA nationality.

No.	Pos.	Nation	Player
1	GK	RUS	Stanislav Kritsyuk (on loan from (Portugal) Braga)
11	MF	RUS	Vyacheslav Podberyozkin (from (Russia) Ural Sverdlovsk Oblast)
38	MF	CIV	Kouassi Eboue (from (Russia) Krasnodar-3)
40	FW	RUS	Alan Koroyev
42	DF	RUS	Mikhail Tikhonov
49	FW	RUS	Alim Makoyev
54	MF	RUS	Roman Kurazhov
60	FW	RUS	Nikita Sergeyev
67	MF	RUS	Andrei Tekuchyov
76	FW	RUS	Ruslan Rzayev

Out: Note: Flags indicate national team as defined under FIFA eligibility rules; some limited exceptions apply. Players may hold more than one non-FIFA nationality.

No.	Pos.	Nation	Player
5	DF	POL	Artur Jędrzejczyk (loan to (Poland) Legia Warsaw)
40	DF	AZE	Elgun Ulukhanov (to (Azerbaijan) Qarabağ)
49	FW	RUS	Dmitri Bakay (to (Russia) Biolog-Novokubansk)
54	MF	RUS	Vyacheslav Yakimov
61	GK	RUS	Dmitri Goryachkin (to (Russia) Dolgoprudny)
67	MF	RUS	Yaroslav Komarov
76	FW	RUS	Abdulmuslim Asilderov
77	GK	RUS	Anton Kochenkov (end of loan from (Russia) Lokomotiv Moscow)

== Competitions ==
=== Russian Premier League ===
==== Results by round ====
Round	1	2	3	4	5	6	7	8	9	10	11	12	13	14	15	16	17	18	19	20	21	22	23	24	25	26	27	28	29	30
Ground	A	H	A	H	A	H	A	H	A	H	A	A	H	A	H	A	H	A	H	A	H	A	H	A	H	H	A	H	A	H
Result	W	L	D	D	W	D	L	W	L	D	D	D	W	W	W	L	W	W	D	W	L	W	W	W	W	W	D	W	L	W
Position	3	6	7	8	6	6	8	6	9	9	9	8	8	7	5	6	6	5	4	4	7	6	5	5	4	3	4	4	4	4

Updated to match(es) played on 21 May 2016. Source: Russian Premier League
A = Away; H = Home; W = Win; D = Draw; L = Loss

==== Matches ====
20 July 2015 1	Amkar Perm	0 – 1	Krasnodar	Perm
17:00 MSK (UTC+3)	Prudnikov (yellow card) 9' (yellow-red card) 13'	Summary	Gazinsky (yellow card) 13' (yellow-red card) 71'; Jędrzejczyk (yellow card) 22'; Mamayev (yellow card) 72'; Laborde (yellow card) 73'; Petrov 84'	Stadium: Zvezda Stadium; Attendance: 10,100; Referee: Aleksei Matyunin

26 July 2015 2	Krasnodar	0 – 1	Spartak Moscow	Krasnodar
20:00 MSK (UTC+3)	Kaleshin (yellow card) 88'	Summary	Movsisyan 12'; Shirokov (yellow card) 90+3'; Rebrov (yellow card) 90+4'	Stadium: Kuban Stadium; Attendance: 24,956; Referee: Mikhail Vilkov

2 August 2015 3	Rostov	0 – 0	Krasnodar	Rostov-on-Don
20:00 MSK (UTC+3)	Kalachev (yellow card) 23'; Navas (yellow card) 74'	Summary	Ahmedov (yellow card) 25'; Kaleshin (yellow card) 70'	Stadium: Olimp-2; Attendance: 12,997; Referee: Vladislav Bezborodov

10 August 2015 4	Krasnodar	1 – 1	Kuban Krasnodar	Krasnodar
20:15 MSK (UTC+3)	Pereyra (yellow card) 72'; Smolov 90'	Summary	Melgarejo 50'; Tlisov (yellow card) 71'; Šunjić (yellow card) 85'; Armaș (yellow card) 87'	Stadium: Kuban Stadium; Attendance: 25,250; Referee: Vitaly Meshkov

15 August 2015 5	Zenit St.Petersburg	0 – 2	Krasnodar	Saint Petersburg
16:30 MSK (UTC+3)	Hulk (yellow card) 90+5'	Summary	Sigurðsson 26' (yellow card) 39'; Laborde 50'; Mamayev (yellow card) 62'; Bystrov (yellow card) 75'; Dykan (yellow card) 87'	Stadium: Petrovsky Stadium; Attendance: 18,593; Referee: Vladimir Moskalyov

23 August 2015 6	Krasnodar	0 – 0	Mordovia Saransk	Krasnodar
20:00 MSK (UTC+3)	Wánderson (yellow card) 49'	Summary	Stevanović (yellow card) 36'; Shitov (yellow card) 54'; Nakhushev (yellow card) 62'	Stadium: Kuban Stadium; Attendance: 7,066; Referee: Alexey Nikolaev

30 August 2015 7	Lokomotiv Moscow	2 – 1	Krasnodar	Moscow
13:30 MSK (UTC+3)	Niasse 18'; Tarasov (yellow card) 30'; Ćorluka (yellow card) 32'; Kasaev 56'	Summary	Smolov 11'; Laborde (yellow card) 21'; Gazinsky (yellow card) 34'; Strandberg (yellow card) 39'	Stadium: Lokomotiv Stadium; Attendance: 10,107; Referee: Sergei Ivanov

13 September 2015 8	Krasnodar	4 – 0	Dynamo Moscow	Krasnodar
16:30 MSK (UTC+3)	Laborde 10'; Gazinsky (yellow card) 33'; Smolov (yellow card) 38'; Mamayev 41', 90+2'; Ahmedov 71'	Summary	Pogrebnyak (yellow card) 74'	Stadium: Kuban Stadium; Attendance: 9,465; Referee: Sergey Lapochkin

21 September 2015 9	Ural	3 – 1	Krasnodar	Yekaterinburg
16:30 MSK (UTC+3)	Podberyozkin 36'; Acevedo 69'; Fontanello 74'	Summary	Ahmedov 22'; Kaboré (yellow card) 45'; Gazinsky (yellow card) 73'	Stadium: SKB-Bank Arena; Attendance: 4,623; Referee: Igor Fedotov

27 September 2015 10	Krasnodar	1 – 1	Terek Grozny	Krasnodar
16:30 MSK (UTC+3)	Petrov 72'; Wánderson (yellow card) 80'	Summary	Kudryashov (yellow card) 37'; Semyonov (yellow card) 53'; Sadayev 56' (yellow card) 90+2'	Stadium: Kuban Stadium; Attendance: 8,150; Referee: Aleksey Eskov

4 October 2015 11	Ufa	1 – 1	Krasnodar	Ufa
16:00 MSK (UTC+3)	Fomin 49' (yellow card) 81'; Frimpong (yellow card) 71' (yellow-red card) 84'; Safronidi (yellow card) 90+4'	Summary	Mamayev 51'; Granqvist (yellow card) 57'; Jędrzejczyk (yellow card) 87'	Stadium: Neftyanik Stadium; Attendance: 6,350; Referee: Mikhail Vilkov

18 October 2015 12	Anzhi Makhachkala	2 – 2	Krasnodar	Kaspiysk
18:30 MSK (UTC+3)	Almeida 15'; Boli 40' (yellow card) 65'; Gasanov (yellow card) 42'; Leonardo (yellow card) 81'; Haruna (yellow card) 86'	Summary	Petrov (yellow card) 33'; Laborde (yellow card) 61' (goal) 79'; Strandberg (yellow card) 65'; Torbinski (yellow card) 74'; Ari 80' (yellow card) 90+3'	Stadium: Anzhi Arena; Attendance: 7,100; Referee: Aleksandr Egorov

25 October 2015 13	Krasnodar	2 – 1	Rubin Kazan	Krasnodar
16:30 MSK (UTC+3)	Ari 16', 24'; Mamayev (yellow card) 49'; Kaleshin (yellow card) 66'; Laborde (yellow card) 78' (yellow-red card) 90+5'	Summary	Kanunnikov 21'; Portnyagin (yellow card) 72'	Stadium: Kuban Stadium; Attendance: 5,350; Referee: Igor Fedotov

1 November 2015 14	Krylia Sovetov	0 – 4	Krasnodar	Samara
14:00 MSK (UTC+3)		Summary	Mamayev 37', 77'; Smolov 61'; Ari 87'	Stadium: Metallurg Stadium; Attendance: 4,850; Referee: Sergei Ivanov

8 November 2015 15	Krasnodar	2 – 1	CSKA Moscow	Krasnodar
17:00 MSK (UTC+3)	Smolov 18', 80'; Ahmedov (yellow card) 70'; Ari (yellow card) 81'; Laborde (yellow card) 90+4'	Summary	Dzagoev 28'; Wernbloom (yellow card) 45+1'; Berezutski (yellow card) 56'	Stadium: Kuban Stadium; Attendance: 12,755; Referee: Vladislav Bezborodov

22 November 2015 16	Spartak Moscow	3 – 2	Krasnodar	Moscow
19:30 MSK (UTC+3)	Parshivlyuk (yellow card) 13'; Glushakov 27', 53'; Promes 29' (yellow card) 90+1'	Summary	Ari 23'; Smolov (yellow card) 72'; Granqvist 81'; Gazinsky (yellow card) 86'	Stadium: Otkrytiye Arena; Attendance: 15,051; Referee: Igor Nizovtsev

30 November 2015 17	Krasnodar	2 – 1	Rostov	Krasnodar
19:00 MSK (UTC+3)	Kaboré (yellow card) 66'; Mamayev 86' (pen.); Wánderson 90+3'	Summary	Terentyev (yellow card) 79' (yellow-red card) 83'; Gațcan (yellow card) 84'; Azmoun 88'	Stadium: Kuban Stadium; Attendance: 4,875; Referee: Sergey Karasev

4 December 2015 18	Kuban Krasnodar	2 – 3	Krasnodar	Krasnodar
19:00 MSK (UTC+3)	Tkachyov 11'; Ignatyev 67'; Melgarejo (yellow card) 69'; Tlisov (yellow card) 77'; Belenov (yellow card) 79'; Bugayev (yellow card) 90'	Summary	Wánderson 71'; Joãozinho (yellow card) 72'; Mamayev 80' (pen.); Smolov 87'; Laborde (yellow card) 88'	Stadium: Kuban Stadium; Attendance: 12,114; Referee: Vladislav Bezborodov

5 March 2016 19	Krasnodar	0 – 0	Zenit St.Petersburg	Krasnodar
19:30 MSK (UTC+3)	Kaboré (yellow card) 61'; Laborde (yellow card) 73'	Summary	Hulk (yellow card) 45'; García (yellow card) 17'	Stadium: Kuban Stadium; Attendance: 16,650; Referee: Sergey Karasev

13 March 2016 20	Mordovia Saransk	0 – 1	Krasnodar	Saransk
14:30 MSK (UTC+3)		Summary	Sigurðsson (red card) 11'; Smolov 24'; Kaboré (yellow card) 51'	Stadium: Start Stadium; Attendance: 6,313; Referee: Aleksey Eskov

20 March 2016 21	Krasnodar	1 – 2	Lokomotiv Moscow	Krasnodar
18:30 MSK (UTC+3)	Granqvist (yellow card) 37'; Pereyra 58' (yellow card) 84'	Summary	Mykhalyk (yellow card) 20'; Ďurica 39' (yellow card) 86'; Samedov 67'; Henty (yellow card) 90'; Kasaev (yellow card) 90+2'	Stadium: Kuban Stadium; Attendance: 8,150; Referee: Vladislav Bezborodov

4 April 2016 22	Dynamo Moscow	1 – 4	Krasnodar	Khimki
19:30 MSK (UTC+3)	Ionov 27' (pen.); Drahun (yellow card) 30'	Summary	Mamayev 31' (pen.); Smolov (yellow card) 32' (goal) 69'; Podberyozkin 47'; Kaleshin (yellow card) 61'; Pereyra (yellow card) 73'; Ahmedov 82'	Stadium: Arena Khimki; Attendance: 3,863; Referee: Sergei Ivanov

10 April 2016 23	Krasnodar	6 – 0	Ural	Krasnodar
17:00 MSK (UTC+3)	Smolov 18', 45+1', 56', 61'; Manucharyan 55' (o.g.); Wánderson 77'	Summary		Stadium: Kuban Stadium; Attendance: 8,850; Referee: Igor Fedotov

16 April 2016 24	Terek Grozny	0 – 1	Krasnodar	Grozny
14:30 MSK (UTC+3)		Summary	Smolov 44'; Ahmedov (yellow card) 90'	Stadium: Akhmat-Arena; Attendance: 17,350; Referee: Aleksandr Egorov

24 April 2016 25	Krasnodar	4 – 0	Ufa	Krasnodar
14:30 MSK (UTC+3)	Wánderson 35', 90'; Smolov 38'; Petrov 70'	Summary	Stotsky (yellow card) 46'; Paurević (yellow card) 82'	Stadium: Kuban Stadium; Attendance: 8,190; Referee: Sergey Lapochkin

1 May 2015 26	Krasnodar	3 – 0	Anzhi Makhachkala	Krasnodar
19:30 MSK (UTC+3)	Granqvist (yellow card) 50'; Smolov 51', 72'; Mamayev 81'	Summary	Moutari (yellow card) 15'; Berisha (yellow card) 90+1'	Stadium: Kuban Stadium; Attendance: 7,575; Referee: Aleksey Eskov

7 May 2016 27	Rubin Kazan	1 – 1	Krasnodar	Kazan
19:30 MSK (UTC+3)	Kanunnikov 29'	Summary	Kaboré (yellow card) 46'; Smolov 55'; Petrov (yellow card) 57'	Stadium: Kazan Arena; Attendance: 6,877; Referee: Alexey Nikolaev

11 May 2016 28	Krasnodar	3 – 0	Krylia Sovetov	Krasnodar
19:30 MSK (UTC+3)	Smolov 18', 47', 67'	Summary	Burlak (yellow card) 44'	Stadium: Kuban Stadium; Attendance: 5,950; Referee: Kirill Levnikov

16 May 2016 29	CSKA Moscow	2 – 0	Krasnodar	Khimki
19:30 MSK (UTC+3)	Musa 17'; Eremenko 47'; Panchenko (yellow card) 79'	Summary	Torbinski (yellow card) 53'; Sigurðsson (yellow card) 84'; Laborde (yellow card) 90+2'; Kaboré (red card) 90+2'	Stadium: Arena Khimki; Attendance: 13,500; Referee: Vitaly Meshkov

21 May 2016 30	Krasnodar	1 – 0	Amkar Perm	Krasnodar
13:30 MSK (UTC+3)	Mamayev 33'; Torbinski (yellow card) 37'; Kaleshin (yellow card) 74'; Joãozinho (yellow card) 84'; Bystrov (yellow card) 89'	Summary	Zaytsev (yellow card) 29'; Ogude (yellow card) 84'; Gigolayev (yellow card) 90+3'	Stadium: Kuban Stadium; Attendance: 11,150; Referee: Evgeny Turbin

==== League table ====
Pos	Team	Pld	W	D	L	GF	GA	GD	Pts	Qualification or relegation
2	Rostov	30	19	6	5	41	20	+21	63	Qualification for the Champions League third qualifying round
3	Zenit Saint Petersburg	30	17	8	5	61	32	+29	59	Qualification for the Europa League group stage (Note: Zenit Saint Petersburg qualified for the Europa League group stage by winning the 2015–16 Russian Cup.)
4	Krasnodar	30	16	8	6	54	25	+29	56	Qualification for the Europa League third qualifying round
5	Spartak Moscow	30	15	5	10	48	39	+9	50	Qualification for the Europa League third qualifying round
6	Lokomotiv Moscow	30	14	8	8	43	33	+10	50	

Source: Russian Premier League, Soccerway
Rules for classification: 1) Points; 2) Matches won; 3) Head-to-head points; 4) Head-to-head matches won; 5) Head-to-head goal difference; 6) Head-to-head goals scored; 7) Head-to-head away goals; 8) Goal difference; 9) Goals scored; 10) Away goals scored.

=== Russian Cup ===
24 September 2015 Round of 32	Zenit-Izhevsk	0 – 1	Krasnodar	Izhevsk
15:00 MSK (UTC+3)	Denis Kibardin (yellow card) 76'	Summary	Gazinsky (yellow card) 12'; Kaleshin (yellow card) 47'; Smolov 86'	Stadium: Central Stadium Zenit; Attendance: 10,000; Referee: Mikhail Belov

29 October 2015 Round of 16	Krasnodar	3 – 1	Anzhi Makhachkala	Kuban Stadium
19:00 MSK (UTC+3)	Mamayev 20' (pen.); Tagirbekov 25' (o.g.); Bystrov (yellow card) 42'; Markov (yellow card) 52'; Joãozinho 90+1'	Summary	Tigiyev (yellow card) 24'; Zhirov (yellow card) 45'; Yeshchenko 71'; Khadartsev (yellow card) 80'; Agalarov (yellow card) 90'; Ebecilio (yellow card) 90'	Stadium: Krasnodar; Attendance: 4,045; Referee: Aleksei Matyunin

1 March 2016 Quarterfinal	Krasnodar	1 – 0 (a.e.t.)	Terek Grozny	Kuban Stadium
19:15 MSK (UTC+3)	Smolov (yellow card) 74'; Granqvist (yellow card) 82' (goal) 116'; Ari (yellow card) 83'	Summary	Wilkshire (yellow card) 49'; Ivanov (yellow card) 57'; Rodolfo (yellow card) 86'	Stadium: Krasnodar; Attendance: 8,750; Referee: Kirill Levnikov

20 April 2016 Semifinal	CSKA Moscow	3 – 1	Krasnodar	Khimki
MSK (UTC+3)	Wernbloom (yellow card) 32'; Golovin 35', 40'; Dzagoev 46'	Summary	Kaboré (yellow card) 64' (yellow-red card) 90'; Sigurðsson 73'; Smolov (yellow card) 90'	Stadium: Arena Khimki

=== UEFA Europa League ===
==== Qualifying rounds ====
30 July 2015 Third qualifying round 1st leg	Krasnodar (Russia)	2 – 0	(Slovakia) Slovan Bratislava	Krasnodar, Russia
20:00 MSK (UTC+3)	Granqvist 45'; Mamayev (yellow card) 56' (goal) 59' (pen.)	Report		Stadium: Kuban Stadium; Attendance: 10,420; Referee: Halis Özkahya (Turkey)

6 August 2015 Third qualifying round 2nd leg	Slovan Bratislava (Slovakia)	3 – 3 (3 – 5 agg.)	(Russia) Krasnodar	Bratislava, Slovakia
21:15 MSK (UTC+3)	Peltier (yellow card) 33'; Vittek 54', 60', 77'; Mészáros (yellow card) 55'	Report	Mamayev 8' (pen.), 11'; Gazinsky (yellow card) 58'; Strandberg (yellow card) 72'; Smolov 90+3' (pen.)	Stadium: Štadión Pasienky; Attendance: 2,852; Referee: Sébastien Delferière (Belgium)

20 August 2015 Playoff round 1st leg	Krasnodar (Russia)	5 – 1	(Finland) HJK	Krasnodar, Russia
20:00 MSK (UTC+3)	Ojala 8' (o.g.); Mamayev 10' (pen.); Bystrov (yellow card) 43'; Smolov 57' (pen.); Wánderson 62'; Gazinsky 64'	Report	Jallow 18' (yellow card) 56'; Ojala (yellow card) 56'; Peiponen (yellow card) 56'; Schüller (yellow card) 68'	Stadium: Kuban Stadium; Attendance: 15,425; Referee: Marijo Strahonja (Croatia)

27 August 2015 Playoff round 2nd leg	HJK (Finland)	0 – 0 (1 – 5 agg.)	(Russia) Krasnodar	Helsinki, Finland
20:00 MSK (UTC+3)	Schüller (yellow card) 36'; Mendy (yellow card) 44'	Report	Torbinski (yellow card) 69'; Jędrzejczyk (yellow card) 90+1'	Stadium: Sonera Stadium; Attendance: 2,953; Referee: Felix Zwayer (Germany)

==== Group stage ====
Pos	Team	Pld	W	D	L	GF	GA	GD	Pts	Qualification
1	(Russia) Krasnodar	6	4	1	1	9	4	+5	13	Advance to knockout phase
2	(Germany) Borussia Dortmund	6	3	1	2	10	5	+5	10	Advance to knockout phase
3	(Greece) PAOK	6	1	4	1	3	3	0	7	
4	(Azerbaijan) Gabala	6	0	2	4	2	12	−10	2	

Source: Soccerway
Rules for classification: Group stage tiebreakers

17 September 2015 1	Borussia Dortmund (Germany)	2 – 1	(Russia) Krasnodar	Dortmund, Germany
20:00 MSK (UTC+3)	Ginter 45+1'; Kagawa (yellow card) 80'; Gündoğan (yellow card) 85'; Park 90+3'	Report	Kaboré (yellow card) 8'; Mamayev 12'; Jędrzejczyk (yellow card) 20'; Laborde (yellow card) 73'	Stadium: Signal Iduna Park; Attendance: 55,200; Referee: Liran Liany (Israel)

1 October 2015 2	Krasnodar (Russia)	2 – 1	(Azerbaijan) Gabala	Krasnodar, Russia
22:05 MSK (UTC+3)	Wánderson 8'; Jędrzejczyk (yellow card) 73'; Granqvist (yellow card) 82'; Smolov 84'; Ahmedov (yellow card) 87'	Report	Pereyra (yellow card) 45'; Dodô 51'; Stanković (yellow card) 80'; Bezotosnyi (yellow card) 81'; Sadiqov (yellow card) 88'	Stadium: Kuban Stadium; Attendance: 8,901; Referee: Marcin Borski (Poland)

22 October 2015 3	PAOK (Greece)	0 – 0	(Russia) Krasnodar	Thessaloniki, Greece
22:05 MSK (UTC+3)	Jairo (yellow card) 63' (yellow-red card) 89'	Report	Jędrzejczyk (yellow card) 19' (yellow-red card) 87'	Stadium: Toumba Stadium; Attendance: 9,325; Referee: Andreas Ekberg (Sweden)

5 November 2015 4	Krasnodar (Russia)	2 – 1	(Greece) PAOK	Krasnodar, Russia
21:00 MSK (UTC+3)	Ari 33' (yellow card) 85'; Torbinski (yellow card) 62'; Joãozinho 67' (pen.); Petrov (yellow card) 84'	Report	Costa (yellow card) 43'; Mak 90+1'	Stadium: Kuban Stadium; Referee: Arnold Hunter (Northern Ireland)

26 November 2015 5	Krasnodar (Russia)	1 – 0	(Germany) Borussia Dortmund	Krasnodar, Russia
19:00 MSK (UTC+3)	Mamayev 2' (pen.); Pereyra (yellow card) 17'; Kaboré (yellow card) 53'; Jędrzejczyk (yellow card) 57'; Ari (yellow card) 90+4'	Report	Hummels (yellow card) 1'	Stadium: Kuban Stadium; Referee: Serdar Gözübüyük (Netherlands)

10 December 2015 6	Gabala (Azerbaijan)	0 – 3	(Russia) Krasnodar	Baku^{4}, Azerbaijan
21:00 MSK (UTC+3)	Dodô (yellow card) 24'	Report	Kaboré (yellow card) 9'; Sigurðsson 26'; Pereyra 40'; Wánderson 75'	Stadium: Bakcell Arena; Referee: István Kovács (Romania)

==== Knockout phase ====
18 February 2016 Round of 32 1st leg	Sparta Prague (Czech Republic)	1 – 0	(Russia) Krasnodar	Prague
23:05 MSK (UTC+3)	Juliš 64'; Brabec (yellow card) 90+4'	Report	Kaleshin (yellow card) 30'; Mamayev (yellow card) 67'	Stadium: Generali Arena; Attendance: 14,120; Referee: Slavko Vinčić (Slovenia)

25 February 2016 Round of 32 2nd leg	Krasnodar (Russia)	0 – 3 (0 – 4 agg.)	(Czech Republic) Sparta Prague	Krasnodar, Russia
21:00 MSK (UTC+3)	Kaboré (yellow card) 23' (yellow-red card) 68'; Pereyra (yellow card) 45'; Smolov (yellow card) 72'	Report	Mareček (yellow card) 41' (goal) 51'; Frýdek 57'; Fatai (yellow card) 64' (goal) 70'	Stadium: Kuban Stadium; Attendance: 14,850; Referee: Stefan Johannesson (Sweden)

== Squad statistics ==
As of match played 21 May 2016

=== Appearances and goals ===
No.	Pos	Nat	Player	Total		Premier League		Russian Cup		Europa League	
No.	Pos	Nat	Player	Apps	Goals	Apps	Goals	Apps	Goals	Apps	Goals
1	GK	(Russia) RUS	Stanislav Kritsyuk	14	0	12	0	2	0	0	0
3	DF	(Norway) NOR	Stefan Strandberg	26	0	13+2	0	2+1	0	6+2	0
4	MF	(Russia) RUS	Dmitri Torbinski	24	0	8+7	0	2	0	3+4	0
6	DF	(Sweden) SWE	Andreas Granqvist	43	3	29	1	3	1	11	1
7	MF	(Russia) RUS	Pavel Mamayev	45	17	28+1	10	3+1	1	10+2	6
8	MF	(Russia) RUS	Yury Gazinsky	34	1	14+7	0	2+1	0	4+6	1
9	FW	(Brazil) BRA	Ari	36	6	15+6	5	1+3	0	8+3	1
10	MF	(Uzbekistan) UZB	Odil Ahmedov	41	3	24+3	3	1+1	0	11+1	0
11	MF	(Russia) RUS	Vyacheslav Podberyozkin	8	1	4+4	1	0	0	0	0
14	MF	(Brazil) BRA	Wánderson	34	8	10+12	5	3+1	0	4+4	3
15	DF	(Uzbekistan) UZB	Nikolay Markov	11	0	2+5	0	3	0	1	0
17	DF	(Russia) RUS	Vitali Kaleshin	36	0	24+1	0	1	0	10	0
18	MF	(Russia) RUS	Vladimir Bystrov	17	0	4+9	0	2	0	1+1	0
21	MF	(Colombia) COL	Ricardo Laborde	32	3	6+14	3	3	0	3+6	0
22	MF	(Brazil) BRA	Joãozinho	23	2	3+11	0	1+2	1	4+2	1
27	DF	(Iceland) ISL	Ragnar Sigurðsson	35	3	23+1	1	2	1	9	1
31	GK	(Ukraine) UKR	Andriy Dykan	26	0	14	0	1	0	11	0
33	MF	(Uruguay) URU	Mauricio Pereyra	28	2	16+4	1	2	0	6	1
38	MF	(Ivory Coast) CIV	Kouassi Eboue	1	0	1	0	0	0	0	0
77	MF	(Burkina Faso) BFA	Charles Kaboré	32	0	20+1	0	4	0	7	0
88	GK	(Russia) RUS	Andrei Sinitsyn	6	0	4	0	1	0	1	0
90	FW	(Russia) RUS	Fyodor Smolov	44	24	29	20	1+2	1	8+4	3
98	MF	(Russia) RUS	Sergei Petrov	34	3	23+1	3	2	0	8	0
Players away from the club on loan:
5	DF	(Poland) POL	Artur Jędrzejczyk	15	0	5+1	0	2	0	6+1	0
Players who left Krasnodar during the season:

=== Goal Scorers ===
Place	Position	Nation	Number	Name	Russian Premier League	Russian Cup	UEFA Europa League	Total
1	FW	(Russia)	90	Fyodor Smolov	20	1	3	24
2	MF	(Russia)	7	Pavel Mamayev	10	1	6	17
3	MF	(Brazil)	14	Wánderson	5	0	3	8
4	FW	(Brazil)	9	Ari	5	0	1	6
5	MF	(Colombia)	21	Ricardo Laborde	3	0	0	3
5	MF	(Uzbekistan)	10	Odil Ahmedov	3	0	0	3
5	MF	(Russia)	98	Sergei Petrov	3	0	0	3
5	DF	(Sweden)	6	Andreas Granqvist	1	1	1	3
5	DF	(Iceland)	27	Ragnar Sigurðsson	1	1	1	3
5				Own goal	1	1	1	3
11	MF	(Uruguay)	33	Mauricio Pereyra	1	0	1	2
11	MF	(Brazil)	22	Joãozinho	0	1	1	2
13	MF	(Russia)	11	Vyacheslav Podberyozkin	1	0	0	1
13	MF	(Russia)	8	Yury Gazinsky	0	0	1	1
				TOTALS	54	6	19	79

=== Disciplinary record ===
Number	Nation	Position	Name	Russian Premier League		Russian Cup		UEFA Europa League		Total	
Number	Nation	Position	Name	Yellow card	Red card	Yellow card	Red card	Yellow card	Red card	Yellow card	Red card
3	(Norway)	DF	Stefan Strandberg	2	0	0	0	1	0	3	0
4	(Russia)	MF	Dmitri Torbinski	3	0	0	0	2	0	5	0
5	(Poland)	DF	Artur Jędrzejczyk	2	0	0	0	6	1	8	1
6	(Sweden)	DF	Andreas Granqvist	2	0	1	0	1	0	4	0
7	(Russia)	MF	Pavel Mamayev	3	0	0	0	2	0	5	0
8	(Russia)	MF	Yury Gazinsky	6	1	1	0	1	0	8	1
9	(Brazil)	FW	Ari	2	0	1	0	3	0	6	0
10	(Uzbekistan)	MF	Odil Ahmedov	3	0	0	0	1	0	4	0
14	(Brazil)	MF	Wánderson	2	0	0	0	0	0	2	0
15	(Uzbekistan)	DF	Nikolay Markov	0	0	1	0	0	0	1	0
17	(Russia)	DF	Vitali Kaleshin	5	0	1	0	1	0	7	0
18	(Russia)	MF	Vladimir Bystrov	2	0	1	0	1	0	4	0
21	(Colombia)	MF	Ricardo Laborde	8	1	0	0	2	0	10	1
22	(Brazil)	MF	Joãozinho	2	0	0	0	0	0	2	0
27	(Iceland)	DF	Ragnar Sigurðsson	2	1	0	0	0	0	2	1
31	(Ukraine)	GK	Andriy Dykan	1	0	0	0	0	0	1	0
33	(Uruguay)	MF	Mauricio Pereyra	3	0	0	0	2	0	5	0
77	(Burkina Faso)	MF	Charles Kaboré	5	1	2	1	5	1	12	3
90	(Russia)	FW	Fyodor Smolov	3	0	2	0	1	0	6	0
98	(Russia)	MF	Sergei Petrov	2	0	0	0	1	0	3	0
			TOTALS	59	4	10	1	28	2	97	7
