= 2014–15 FC Krasnodar season =

FC Krasnodar
2014–15 season
- Chairman: Sergey Galitsky
- Manager: Aleh Konanaw
- Stadium: Kuban Stadium
- Russian Premier League: 3rd
- Russian Cup: Last 16 vs Krylia Sovetov
- Europa League: Group Stage
- Top goalscorer: League: Mauricio Pereyra (9); All: Ari (14)
- Highest home attendance: 31,050 vs Everton; 2 October 2014
- Lowest home attendance: 2,680 vs Terek Grozny; 27 October 2014
- Average home league attendance: 12,601; 31 May 2015
| Home colours | Away colours |

The 2014–15 FC Krasnodar season was the 4th successive season that the club played in the Russian Premier League, the highest tier of association football in Russia. Krasnodar also took part in the Russian Cup and the Europa League for the first time in the club's history, entering at the Third qualifying round.

== Squad ==
As of 3 March 2015

Note: Flags indicate national team as defined under FIFA eligibility rules; some limited exceptions apply. Players may hold more than one non-FIFA nationality.

| No. | Pos. | Nation | Player |
|---|---|---|---|
| 4 | DF | BLR | Alyaksandr Martynovich (C) |
| 5 | DF | POL | Artur Jędrzejczyk |
| 6 | DF | SWE | Andreas Granqvist |
| 7 | MF | RUS | Pavel Mamayev |
| 8 | MF | RUS | Yuri Gazinskiy |
| 9 | FW | BRA | Ari |
| 10 | MF | UZB | Odil Ahmedov |
| 11 | MF | RUS | Marat Izmailov (loan from Porto) |
| 14 | FW | BRA | Wánderson |
| 15 | MF | RUS | Roman Shirokov (loan from Spartak Moscow) |
| 17 | DF | RUS | Vitali Kaleshin |

| No. | Pos. | Nation | Player |
|---|---|---|---|
| 18 | MF | RUS | Vladimir Bystrov |
| 20 | MF | RUS | Ruslan Adzhindzhal |
| 21 | MF | COL | Ricardo Laborde |
| 22 | MF | BRA | Joãozinho |
| 25 | MF | RUS | Yevgeni Shipitsin |
| 27 | DF | ISL | Ragnar Sigurðsson |
| 31 | GK | UKR | Andriy Dykan |
| 33 | MF | URU | Mauricio Pereyra |
| 88 | GK | RUS | Andrei Sinitsyn |
| 98 | MF | RUS | Sergei Petrov |

=== Out on loan ===
Note: Flags indicate national team as defined under FIFA eligibility rules; some limited exceptions apply. Players may hold more than one non-FIFA nationality.

| No. | Pos. | Nation | Player |
|---|---|---|---|
| 2 | DF | RUS | Nikolai Markov (at Ural Sverdlovsk Oblast) |
| 16 | MF | RUS | Aleksei Pomerko (at Krylia Sovetov) |
| 19 | FW | RUS | Nikita Burmistrov (at Tom Tomsk) |
| 48 | DF | RUS | Aleksandr Marchenko (at Chernomorets Novorossiysk until 30 June 2014) |
| 58 | MF | RUS | Pavel Kryzhevskikh (at Spartak Nalchik) |

| No. | Pos. | Nation | Player |
|---|---|---|---|
| 63 | FW | RUS | Nikolay Komlichenko (at Chernomorets Novorossiysk until 30 June 2014) |
| 68 | MF | RUS | Nika Chkhapeliya (at Spartak Nalchik until 30 June 2014) |
| 82 | MF | RUS | Nikolay Ogurtsov (at Spartak Nalchik) |
| 87 | FW | RUS | Ruslan Bolov (at Spartak Nalchik until 30 June 2014) |

=== Reserve squad ===
Note: Flags indicate national team as defined under FIFA eligibility rules; some limited exceptions apply. Players may hold more than one non-FIFA nationality.

| No. | Pos. | Nation | Player |
|---|---|---|---|
| 37 | DF | RUS | Aleksandr Luzin |
| 41 | DF | RUS | Aleksei Tatayev |
| 42 | DF | RUS | Dmitri Novak |
| 43 | MF | RUS | Daur Kvekveskiri |
| 46 | DF | RUS | Vitali Stezhko |
| 47 | FW | RUS | Ilya Zhigulyov |
| 48 | MF | RUS | Aleksandr Sergeyev |
| 49 | FW | RUS | Dmitri Bakay |
| 51 | GK | RUS | Denis Kavlinov |
| 52 | GK | RUS | Yevgeni Latyshonok |
| 53 | MF | RUS | Pavel Marushko |
| 56 | FW | RUS | Ilya Belous |
| 57 | MF | RUS | Nikita Akimov |
| 59 | DF | RUS | Nikita Katayev |
| 61 | GK | RUS | Dmitri Goryachkin |
| 62 | MF | RUS | Ruslan Rzayev |
| 64 | MF | RUS | Oleg Lanin |
| 65 | DF | RUS | Andrei Gamalyan |
| 66 | GK | RUS | Denis Adamov |

| No. | Pos. | Nation | Player |
|---|---|---|---|
| 67 | MF | RUS | Yaroslav Komarov |
| 68 | FW | RUS | Andrei Batyutin |
| 71 | DF | RUS | Dmitri Kuzmichyov |
| 72 | MF | RUS | Aleksei Mayer |
| 73 | GK | RUS | Stanislav Antipin |
| 74 | MF | RUS | Daniil Fomin |
| 75 | FW | RUS | Levon Bayramyan |
| 76 | MF | RUS | Aleksandr Ageyev |
| 79 | DF | RUS | Batraz Gurtsiyev |
| 81 | DF | RUS | Yevgeni Nesterenko |
| 83 | DF | RUS | Maksim Starkov |
| 86 | DF | RUS | Vasili Cherov |
| 87 | DF | RUS | Arutyun Grigoryan |
| 92 | MF | RUS | Ivan Takhmazov |
| 93 | DF | RUS | Anton Maltsev |
| 95 | FW | RUS | Aslan Vershinin |
| 96 | MF | RUS | Ilya Borisov |
| 97 | MF | RUS | Nurik Gadzhiyev |

== Transfers ==
=== Summer ===
In: Note: Flags indicate national team as defined under FIFA eligibility rules; some limited exceptions apply. Players may hold more than one non-FIFA nationality.

| No. | Pos. | Nation | Player |
|---|---|---|---|
| 10 | MF | UZB | Odil Ahmedov (from (Russia) Anzhi Makhachkala) |
| 11 | MF | RUS | Marat Izmailov (loan from (Portugal) Porto) |
| 18 | MF | RUS | Vladimir Bystrov (from (Russia) Zenit St. Petersburg) |
| 19 | FW | RUS | Nikita Burmistrov (from (Russia) Anzhi Makhachkala) |
| 20 | MF | RUS | Ruslan Ajinjal (from (Russia) Krylia Sovetov Samara) |
| 23 | GK | UKR | Andriy Dykan (from (Russia) Spartak Moscow) |
| — | MF | RUS | Igor Lambarschi (end of loan to (Russia) Yenisey Krasnoyarsk) |

Out: Note: Flags indicate national team as defined under FIFA eligibility rules; some limited exceptions apply. Players may hold more than one non-FIFA nationality.

| No. | Pos. | Nation | Player |
|---|---|---|---|
| 3 | DF | SRB | Dušan Anđelković |
| 15 | MF | RUS | Roman Shirokov (end of loan from (Russia) Zenit St. Petersburg) |
| 19 | MF | BRA | Isael (to (Kazakhstan) Kairat) |
| 23 | GK | RUS | Aleksandr Filtsov (to (Russia) Rubin Kazan) |
| 26 | MF | POR | Márcio Abreu (to (Russia) Torpedo Moscow) |
| 29 | FW | CIV | Gerard Gohou (to (Kazakhstan) Kairat) |
| 35 | MF | RUS | Oleg Samsonov (to (Russia) Tyumen) |
| 46 | DF | RUS | Andrei Gamalyan (loan to (Armenia) FC Shirak) |
| 55 | DF | SRB | Nemanja Tubić (to (Belarus) BATE Borisov) |
| 77 | MF | HUN | Vladimir Koman (Released, previously on loan to (Russia) Ural Sverdlovsk Oblast) |
| 77 | FW | SEN | Moussa Konaté (to (Switzerland) Sion, previously on loan to (Italy) Genoa) |
| 95 | FW | RUS | Aleksandr Petruchenko |
| — | MF | MDA | Valeriu Ciupercă (to (Russia) Anzhi Makhachkala, previously on loan to (Russia) Spartak Nalchik) |
| — | FW | RUS | Khyzyr Appayev (released, previously on loan to (Russia) Rotor Volgograd) |

=== Winter ===
In: Note: Flags indicate national team as defined under FIFA eligibility rules; some limited exceptions apply. Players may hold more than one non-FIFA nationality.

| No. | Pos. | Nation | Player |
|---|---|---|---|
| 15 | MF | RUS | Roman Shirokov (on loan from (Russia) Spartak Moscow) |
| 41 | DF | RUS | Aleksei Tatayev |
| 43 | MF | RUS | Daur Kvekveskiri (from (Russia) Krasnodar-3) |
| 48 | MF | RUS | Aleksandr Sergeyev |
| 52 | GK | RUS | Yevgeni Latyshonok |
| 59 | DF | RUS | Nikita Katayev |
| 62 | MF | RUS | Ruslan Rzayev |
| 65 | DF | RUS | Andrei Gamalyan (end of loan to (Armenia) Shirak) |
| 67 | MF | RUS | Yaroslav Komarov |
| 79 | DF | RUS | Batraz Gurtsiyev |
| 92 | MF | RUS | Ivan Takhmazov |

Out: Note: Flags indicate national team as defined under FIFA eligibility rules; some limited exceptions apply. Players may hold more than one non-FIFA nationality.

| No. | Pos. | Nation | Player |
|---|---|---|---|
| 2 | DF | UZB | Nikolai Markov (on loan to (Russia) Ural Sverdlovsk Oblast) |
| 19 | FW | RUS | Nikita Burmistrov (on loan to (Russia) Tom Tomsk) |
| 41 | MF | RUS | Yevgeni Andriyenko |
| 43 | DF | RUS | Ruslan Shlyakhov |
| 48 | DF | RUS | Aleksandr Marchenko (loan to (Russia) Chernomorets Novorossiysk) |
| 54 | MF | RUS | Aleksei Orlov |
| 58 | MF | RUS | Pavel Kryzhevskikh (on loan to (Russia) Spartak Nalchik) |
| 62 | FW | RUS | Valeri Alshanskiy (to (Russia) Arsenal Tula) |
| 63 | FW | RUS | Nikolay Komlichenko (loan to (Russia) Chernomorets Novorossiysk) |
| 65 | FW | RUS | Boris Shavlokhov |
| 82 | MF | RUS | Nikolay Ogurtsov (on loan to (Russia) Spartak Nalchik) |
| 85 | DF | RUS | Stepan Protsenko |
| 92 | DF | RUS | Aleksei Shatokhin |
| — | MF | ARM | Marcos Pizzelli (to (Kazakhstan) Aktobe, previously on loan) |

== Friendlies ==
| 28 June 2014 | Qarabağ (Azerbaijan) | 0 – 1 | (Russia) Krasnodar | Hochfilzen, Austria |
| 19:00 MSK (UTC+4) | | Report | Ahmedov 47' | Attendance: 100; Referee: Hofer |

| 3 July 2014 | Celtic (Scotland) | 3 – 1 | (Russia) Krasnodar | Bad Wimsbach-Neydharting, Austria |
| 20:30 MSK (UTC+4) | Stokes 2'; Johansen 39'; McGregor 50' | Report | Ahmedov 20' | Stadium: Hofmaninger Stadion |

| 12 July 2014 | Olympiacos (Greece) | 0 – 2 | (Russia) Krasnodar | Walchsee, Austria |
| 19.00 MSK (UTC+4) | | Report | Joãozinho 42'; Sigurðsson 47' | Attendance: 600; Referee: Pentz, Myullbaher, |

| 29 January 2015 | Jeonbuk Hyundai Motors (South Korea) | 1 – 0 | (Russia) Krasnodar | Dubai, United Arab Emirates |
| 14:00 MSK (UTC+3) | Eninho 75' | Report | | Stadium: Jebal Ali; Attendance: 30; Referee: Al Smee |

| 2 February 2015 | Kairat (Kazakhstan) | 2 – 2 | (Russia) Krasnodar | Dubai, United Arab Emirates |
| MSK (UTC+3) | Gohou 3'; V.Lee 74' | Report | Wánderson 23', 90+4' | Stadium: Jebal Ali; Attendance: 50; Referee: A. Al Bloch (Oman) |

| 26 February 2015 | Krasnodar | 2 – 0 | Anzhi Makhachkala | Belek, Turkey |
| 17:00 MSK (UTC+3) | Joãozinho 36'; Ari (yellow card) 45'; Mamayev (yellow card) 56'; Martynovich 76' | Summary | Aydov (yellow card) 68' | Referee: Igor Krutoy |

== Competitions ==
=== Russian Premier League ===
==== Results by round ====
| Round | 1 | 2 | 3 | 4 | 5 | 6 | 7 | 8 | 9 | 10 | 11 | 12 | 13 | 14 | 15 | 16 | 17 | 18 | 19 | 20 | 21 | 22 | 23 | 24 | 25 | 26 | 27 | 28 | 29 | 30 |
|---|---|---|---|---|---|---|---|---|---|---|---|---|---|---|---|---|---|---|---|---|---|---|---|---|---|---|---|---|---|---|
| Ground | A | A | H | A | A | H | H | A | H | H | H | A | H | H | A | A | A | A | H | A | H | A | H | A | H | A | H | H | H | A |
| Result | D | D | W | W | W | L | L | W | W | D | W | L | W | W | W | D | L | W | D | W | W | W | W | D | W | W | D | D | W | D |
| Position | 9 | 10 | 6 | 5 | 4 | 7 | 7 | 7 | 6 | 5 | 3 | 3 | 3 | 2 | 2 | 3 | 4 | 4 | 4 | 3 | 3 | 2 | 2 | 2 | 2 | 2 | 2 | 3 | 3 | 3 |

Updated to match(es) played on 30 May 2015. Source: Russian Premier League
A = Away; H = Home; W = Win; D = Draw; L = Loss

==== Matches ====
| 3 August 2014 1 | Lokomotiv Moscow | 0 – 0 | Krasnodar | Moscow |
| 21:30 MSK (UTC+4) | Shishkin (yellow card) 25'; Yanbayev (yellow card) 59'; Pejčinović (yellow card) 90+3' | Summary | Pomerko (yellow card) 31'; Gazinskiy (yellow card) 44'; Jędrzejczyk (yellow card) 68' | Stadium: Lokomotiv Stadium; Attendance: 12,175; Referee: Sergey Lapochkin |

| 10 August 2014 2 | Ural | 1 – 1 | Krasnodar | Yekaterinburg |
| 16:30 MSK (UTC+4) | Fidler (yellow card) 34'; Lungu 59'; Ottesen (yellow card) 78' | Summary | Joãozinho 19' (pen.); Ahmedov (yellow card) 53'; Granqvist (yellow card) 85' | Stadium: Central Stadium; Attendance: 8,200; Referee: Vladislav Bezborodov |

| 14 August 2014 3 | Krasnodar | 4 – 0 | Spartak Moscow | Krasnodar |
| 21:00 MSK (UTC+4) | Izmailov 27'; Ari 56' (yellow card) 57'; Petrov (yellow card) 60'; Bystrov 62'; Joãozinho 67' (pen.) | Summary | Makeyev (yellow card) 59'; Bocchetti (yellow card) 73'; Parshivlyuk (yellow card) 81' | Stadium: Kuban Stadium; Attendance: 12,300; Referee: Sergey Ivanov |

| 17 August 2014 4 | Rostov | 0 – 2 | Krasnodar | Rostov-on-Don |
| 21:00 MSK (UTC+4) | Milić (yellow card) 19'; Fatullayev (yellow card) 26'; Troshechkin (yellow card) 78' | Summary | Joãozinho 21'; Granqvist (yellow card) 38'; Laborde (yellow card) 43'; Ahmedov 58' | Stadium: Olimp-2; Attendance: 8,000; Referee: Igor Nizovtsev |

| 24 August 2014 5 | Torpedo Moscow | 0 – 3 | Krasnodar | Ramenskoye |
| 16:30 MSK (UTC+4) | Stevanovic (yellow card) 69' | Summary | Bystrov 62'; Wánderson 64'; Sigurðsson (yellow card) 83'; Martynovich (yellow card) 83'; Pereyra 90+3' | Stadium: Saturn Stadium; Attendance: 2,800; Referee: Mikhail Vilkov |

| 30 August 2014 6 | Krasnodar | 0 – 2 | Dynamo Moscow | Krasnodar |
| 20:15 MSK (UTC+4) | Sigurðsson (yellow card) 34'; Izmailov (yellow card) 40' | Summary | Valbuena 35'; Samba (yellow card) 45+2'; Noboa 49'; Yusupov (yellow card) 65' (yellow-red card) 67'; Granat (yellow card) 90+4' | Stadium: Kuban Stadium; Attendance: 13,500; Referee: Vitaly Meshkov |

| 14 September 2014 7 | Krasnodar | 0 – 2 | Ufa | Krasnodar |
| 19:00 MSK (UTC+4) | Gazinskiy (yellow card) 60'; Pereyra (yellow card) 81' | Summary | Marcinho 7'; Tishkin (yellow card) 30'; Alikin 53'; Frimpong (yellow card) 66'; Zaseyev (yellow card) 70'; Galiullin (yellow card) 90+3' | Stadium: Kuban Stadium; Attendance: 7,856; Referee: Alexey Nikolaev |

| 22 September 2014 8 | Amkar Perm' | 1 – 2 | Krasnodar | Perm |
| 17:00 MSK (UTC+4) | Dzakhov (yellow card) 34'; Balanovich (yellow card) 38'; Kireyev 44'; Cherenchikov (yellow card) 73' | Summary | Wánderson 26'; Kaleshin (yellow card) 27'; Joãozinho 74' (pen.); Jędrzejczyk (yellow card) 90+2'; Dykan (yellow card) 90+2' | Stadium: Zvezda Stadium; Attendance: 8,500; Referee: Aleksei Matyunin |

| 28 September 2014 9 | Krasnodar | 3 – 0 | Arsenal Tula | Krasnodar |
| 18:30 MSK (UTC+4) | Gazinskiy (yellow card) 27'; Wánderson 33'; Pereyra 60'; Ari 66' | Summary | Lyakh (yellow card) 7'; Lozenkov (yellow card) 85' | Stadium: Kuban Stadium; Attendance: 5,987; Referee: Igor Fedotov |

| 18 October 2014 10 | Krasnodar | 2 – 2 | Zenit St.Petersburg | Krasnodar |
| 17:00 MSK (UTC+4) | Sigurðsson 7'; Mamayev 21'; Granqvist (yellow card) 29'; Kaleshin (yellow card) 55' | Summary | García 38' (yellow card) 58'; Hulk 60'; Garay (red card) 68' | Stadium: Kuban Stadium; Attendance: 9,650; Referee: Timur Arslanbekov |

| 27 October 2014 11 | Krasnodar | 2 – 0 | Terek Grozny | Krasnodar |
| 18:45 MSK (UTC+3) | Joãozinho 60' (pen.); Ari (yellow card) 63'; Laborde 77' (yellow card) 77'; Gazinskiy (yellow card) 79' | Summary | Komorowski (yellow card) 74' | Stadium: Kuban Stadium; Attendance: 2,680; Referee: Sergey Lapochkin |

| 2 November 2014 12 | Mordovia Saransk | 2 – 1 | Krasnodar | Saransk |
| 16:30 MSK (UTC+3) | Lomić 56' (pen.), 76'; Niasse (yellow card) 84'; Kochenkov (yellow card) 90+1' | Summary | Joãozinho 38'; Kaleshin (yellow card) 52' | Stadium: Start Stadium; Attendance: 1,967; Referee: Vitaly Meshkov |

| 9 November 2014 13 | Krasnodar | 2 – 0 | Rubin Kazan' | Krasnodar |
| 15:45 MSK (UTC+3) | Petrov 8'; Laborde 72'; Ari (yellow card) 88' | Summary | Georgiev (yellow card) 49' | Stadium: Kuban Stadium; Attendance: 10,120; Referee: Aleksei Matyunin |

| 22 November 2014 14 | Krasnodar | 2 – 1 | CSKA Moscow | Krasnodar |
| 16:30 MSK (UTC+3) | Ari 4', 6'; Izmailov (yellow card) 68'; Laborde (yellow card) 69'; Sigurðsson (yellow card) 89' | Summary | Eremenko 14' | Stadium: Kuban Stadium; Attendance: 12,200; Referee: Sergey Lapochkin |

| 30 November 2014 15 | Terek Grozny | 0 – 1 | Krasnodar | Grozny |
| 18:30 MSK (UTC+3) | Aílton (yellow card) 67' | Summary | Wánderson 18'; Izmailov (yellow card) 41'; Gazinskiy (yellow card) 48'; Ari (yellow card) 86'; Pereyra (yellow card) 90+4' | Stadium: Akhmat-Arena; Attendance: 14,353; Referee: Igor Nizovtsev |

| 3 December 2014 16 | Kuban Krasnodar | 1 – 1 | Krasnodar | Krasnodar |
| 20:00 MSK (UTC+3) | Kaboré (yellow card) 53'; Bucur 58'; Xandão (yellow card) 74'; Tlisov (yellow card) 84'; Yeshchenko (yellow card) 86' | Summary | Pereyra 21'; Kaleshin (yellow card) 67'; Laborde (yellow card) 80'; Izmailov (yellow card) 89' | Stadium: Kuban Stadium; Attendance: 11,911; Referee: Alexey Nikolaev |

| 6 December 2014 17 | Zenit St.Petersburg | 4 – 0 | Krasnodar | Saint Petersburg |
| 16:45 MSK (UTC+3) | Garay 12'; Witsel 55'; Danny 61' (yellow card) 81'; Smolnikov 68' | Summary | Mamayev (yellow card) 42' | Stadium: Petrovsky Stadium; Attendance: 17,666; Referee: Mikhail Vilkov |

| 8 March 2015 18 | Spartak Moscow | 1 – 3 | Krasnodar | Moscow |
| 13:30 MSK (UTC+3) | Källström (yellow card) 8'; Promes 87' | Summary | Pereyra 61'; Ahmedov (yellow card) 66' (goal) 72'; Ari 67' | Stadium: Otkrytie Arena; Attendance: 28,039; Referee: Sergey Ivanov |

| 13 March 2015 19 | Krasnodar | 1 – 1 | Ural | Krasnodar |
| MSK (UTC+3) | Mamayev 45+1' | Summary | Fidler (yellow card) 49'; Smolov 50' | Stadium: Kuban Stadium; Attendance: 5,800; Referee: Aleksandr Egorov |

| 20 March 2015 20 | Ufa | 0 – 2 | Krasnodar | Ufa |
| 17:00 MSK (UTC+3) | Paurević (yellow card) 14'; Alikin (yellow card) 34'; Zaseyev (yellow card) 58'; Tumasyan (yellow card) 72' | Summary | Kaleshin 25' (yellow card) 41'; Ari 53' | Stadium: Dynamo Stadium; Attendance: 3,087; Referee: Aleksey Eskov |

| 4 April 2015 21 | Krasnodar | 4 – 0 | Mordovia Saransk | Krasnodar |
| 16:45 MSK (UTC+3) | Mamayev 5', 70'; Izmailov (yellow card) 15'; Laborde 85'; Bystrov 90+1' | Summary | Božović (yellow card) 67'; Shitov (yellow card) 83' | Stadium: Kuban Stadium; Attendance: 5,100; Referee: Igor Fedotov |

| 7 April 2015 22 | Rubin Kazan' | 1 – 2 | Krasnodar | Kazan |
| 20:00 MSK (UTC+3) | Dyadyun 22'; Nabiullin (yellow card) 31'; Ozdoyev (yellow card) 54'; Georgiev (yellow card) 72' | Summary | Pereyra 32', 85'; Laborde (yellow card) 42'; Ahmedov (yellow card) 76'; Bystrov (yellow card) 90+1'; Dykan (yellow card) 90+2' | Stadium: Kazan Arena; Attendance: 3,615; Referee: Igor Nizovtsev |

| 11 April 2015 23 | Krasnodar | 3 – 2 | Kuban Krasnodar | Krasnodar |
| 19:00 MSK (UTC+3) | Pereyra 37'; Shirokov 60'; Kaleshin (yellow card) 79' | Summary | Sosnin 30'; Ignatyev 54'; Tkachyov (yellow card) 73' | Stadium: Kuban Stadium; Attendance: 19,000; Referee: Sergey Ivanov |

| 19 April 2015 24 | CSKA Moscow | 1 – 1 | Krasnodar | Khimki |
| 13:30 MSK (UTC+3) | Wernbloom (yellow card) 42' (goal) 44'; Nababkin (yellow card) 83' | Summary | Mamayev (yellow card) 43'; Pereyra (yellow card) 68'; Ari (yellow card) 80'; Wánderson 88' | Stadium: Arena Khimki; Attendance: 10,000; Referee: Vladislav Bezborodov |

| 25 April 2015 25 | Krasnodar | 1 – 0 | Lokomotiv Moscow | Krasnodar |
| 19:00 MSK (UTC+3) | Pereyra 37' (pen.); Laborde (yellow card) 90+2' | Summary | Mykhalyk (yellow card) 16'; Samedov (yellow card) 36'; Shishkin (yellow card) 79'; Pejčinović (yellow card) 90+4' | Stadium: Kuban Stadium; Attendance: 18,347; Referee: Sergey Lapochkin |

| 4 May 2015 26 | Arsenal Tula | 0 – 3 | Krasnodar | Moscow |
| 15:30 MSK (UTC+3) | Osipov (yellow card) 41'; Khagush (yellow card) 63' | Summary | Shirokov 38' (yellow card) 45+1'; Ari 55'; Granqvist (yellow card) 87'; Laborde 90+1' | Stadium: Lokomotiv Stadium; Attendance: 2,000; Referee: Sergey Ivanov |

| 11 May 2015 27 | Krasnodar | 1 – 1 | Amkar Perm' | Krasnodar |
| 18:30 MSK (UTC+3) | Pereyra 8'; Kaleshin (yellow card) 25'; Laborde (yellow card) 83'; Sigurðsson (yellow card) 90+5' | Summary | Gol 23'; Batov (yellow card) 88' | Stadium: Kuban Stadium; Attendance: 10,125; Referee: Vladislav Bezborodov |

| 17 May 2015 28 | Krasnodar | 2 – 2 | Torpedo Moscow | Krasnodar |
| 18:30 MSK (UTC+3) | Wánderson 25' (pen.); Pereyra (yellow card) 27'; Granqvist (yellow card) 43'; Zhevnov 63' (o.g.); Bystrov (yellow card) 76' | Summary | Rykov (yellow card) 24'; Steklov (yellow card) 20'; Putsila 59'; Kombarov (yellow card) 62' (goal) 74' | Stadium: Kuban Stadium; Attendance: 9,780; Referee: Kirill Levnikov |

| 24 May 2015 29 | Krasnodar | 2 – 1 | Rostov | Krasnodar |
| 13:30 MSK (UTC+3) | Shirokov 10'; Wánderson 33'; Bystrov (yellow card) 85'; Laborde (yellow card) 90+2' | Summary | Kanga (yellow card) 29'; Bardachow (yellow card) 57'; Novoseltsev (yellow card) 66'; Azmoun (yellow card) 68'; Dyakov 75'; Doumbia (yellow card) 81' | Stadium: Kuban Stadium; Attendance: 10,900; Referee: Mikhail Vilkov |

| 30 May 2015 30 | Dynamo Moscow | 1 – 1 | Krasnodar | Moscow |
| 13:30 MSK (UTC+3) | Dzsudzsák 16'; Kurányi (yellow card) 29'; Gabulov (yellow card) 78'; Rotenberg (yellow card) 89' | Summary | Shirokov 20'; Izmailov (yellow card) 90' | Stadium: Arena Khimki; Attendance: 7,827; Referee: Sergey Lapochkin |

==== League table ====
| Pos | Team | Pld | W | D | L | GF | GA | GD | Pts | Qualification or relegation |
|---|---|---|---|---|---|---|---|---|---|---|
| 1 | Zenit St. Petersburg (C) | 30 | 20 | 7 | 3 | 58 | 17 | +41 | 67 | Qualification for the Champions League group stage |
| 2 | CSKA Moscow | 30 | 19 | 3 | 8 | 67 | 27 | +40 | 60 | Qualification for the Champions League third qualifying round |
| 3 | Krasnodar | 30 | 17 | 9 | 4 | 52 | 27 | +25 | 60 | Qualification for the Europa League third qualifying round |
| 4 | Dynamo Moscow | 30 | 14 | 8 | 8 | 53 | 36 | +17 | 50 | |
| 5 | Rubin Kazan | 30 | 13 | 9 | 8 | 39 | 33 | +6 | 48 | Qualification for the Europa League third qualifying round |

Source: Russian Premier League
Rules for classification: 1) points; 2) number of matches won; 3) head-to-head points; 4) head-to-head wins; 5) head-to-head goal difference; 6) head-to-head goals; 7) number of head-to-head away goals; 8) goal difference; 9) number of goals scored; 10) number of away goals scored
(C) Champions

=== Russian Cup ===
| 25 September 2014 Round of 32 | Sokol Saratov | 0 – 5 | Krasnodar | Saratov |
| 16:00 MSK (UTC+4) | | Summary | Petrov 20'; Ari 41'; Joãozinho 51', 56'; A.Ageyev 75'; Martynovich (yellow card) 77' | Stadium: Lokomotiv Stadium; Attendance: 9,200; Referee: Vasiliy Kazartsev |

| 30 October 2014 Round of 16 | Krasnodar | 1 – 3 | Krylia Sovetov | Krasnodar |
| 20:00 MSK (UTC+4) | Joãozinho (yellow card) 22'; Wánderson 71'; Mamayev (yellow card) 72' | Summary | Pomerko (yellow card) 22'; Yatchenko 47'; Chochiyev 47'; Tsallagov 88' (pen.) | Stadium: Kuban Stadium; Attendance: 4,250; Referee: Vitaly Rushakov |

=== UEFA Europa League ===
==== Qualifying phase ====
| 17 July 2014 Second qualifying round 1st leg | Sillamäe Kalev (Estonia) | 0 – 4 | (Russia) Krasnodar | Tallinn, Estonia |
| 23:30 MSK (UTC+4) | Dudarev (yellow card) 58' | Report | Ari 9'; Gazinskiy 39'; Wánderson 68'; Bystrov 86' | Stadium: A. Le Coq Arena; Attendance: 2,130; Referee: Bojan Pandžić (Sweden) |

| 24 July 2014 Second qualifying round 2nd leg | Krasnodar (Russia) | 5 – 0 (9 – 0 agg.) | (Estonia) Sillamäe Kalev | Krasnodar, Russia |
| 20:00 MSK (UTC+4) | Joãozinho 28'; Laborde 65'; Wánderson 67', 74' (pen.); Burmistrov 76' | Report | Tjapkin (yellow card) 73' | Stadium: Kuban Stadium; Attendance: 12,200; Referee: Sándor Andó-Szabó (Hungary) |

| 31 July 2014 Third qualifying round 1st leg | Diósgyőr (Hungary) | 1 – 5 | (Russia) Krasnodar | Nyíregyháza, Hungary |
| 22:30 MSK (UTC+4) | Bacsa 49'; Gosztonyi (yellow card) 67' | Report | Ari 28'; Ahmedov 40'; Pereyra 51'; Joãozinho 88' (pen.); Bystrov 90' | Stadium: Városi Stadion; Attendance: 4,664; Referee: Bülent Yıldırım (Turkey) |

| 7 August 2014 Third qualifying round 2nd leg | Krasnodar (Russia) | 3 – 0 (8 – 1 agg.) | (Hungary) Diósgyőr | Krasnodar, Russia |
| 20:00 MSK (UTC+4) | Konaté 30', 55'; Ari 86' | Report | Kádár (yellow card) 31'; Bori (yellow card) 41' | Stadium: Kuban Stadium; Attendance: 8,800; Referee: Christian Dingert (Germany) |

| 21 August 2014 Play-off round 1st leg | Real Sociedad (Spain) | 1 – 0 | (Russia) Krasnodar | San Sebastián, Spain |
| 22:30 MSK (UTC+4) | Xabi 71' | Report | Granqvist (yellow card) 19'; Laborde (yellow card) 84'; Jędrzejczyk (yellow card) 88' | Stadium: Anoeta Stadium; Attendance: 22,245; Referee: Ruddy Buquet (France) |

| 28 August 2014 Play-off round 2nd leg | Krasnodar (Russia) | 3 – 0 (3 – 1 agg.) | (Spain) Real Sociedad | Krasnodar, Russia |
| 20:00 MSK (UTC+4) | Joãozinho 71' (pen.) (red card) 90+1'; Pereyra 88'; Ari 90' | Report | Zurutuza (yellow card) 56' de la Bella (yellow card) 70'; Bergara (yellow card) 76' (yellow-red card) 90+1'; Martínez (yellow card) 80'; Elustondo (yellow card) 90+7' | Stadium: Kuban Stadium; Attendance: 26,572; Referee: Szymon Marciniak (Poland) |

==== Group stage ====
| Pos | Team | Pld | W | D | L | GF | GA | GD | Pts | Qualification | EVE | WOL | KRA | LIL |
|---|---|---|---|---|---|---|---|---|---|---|---|---|---|---|
| 1 | (England) Everton | 6 | 3 | 2 | 1 | 10 | 3 | +7 | 11 | Advance to knockout phase | — | 4–1 | 0–1 | 3–0 |
| 2 | (Germany) VfL Wolfsburg | 6 | 3 | 1 | 2 | 14 | 10 | +4 | 10 | Advance to knockout phase | 0–2 | — | 5–1 | 1–1 |
| 3 | (Russia) Krasnodar | 6 | 1 | 3 | 2 | 7 | 12 | −5 | 6 | | 1–1 | 2–4 | — | 1–1 |
| 4 | (France) Lille | 6 | 0 | 4 | 2 | 3 | 9 | −6 | 4 | | 0–0 | 0–3 | 1–1 | — |

Source: Soccerway
Rules for classification: Group stage tiebreakers

| 18 September 2014 1 | Lille (France) | 1 – 1 | (Russia) Krasnodar | Villeneuve-d'Ascq, France |
| 23:05 MSK (UTC+4) | Kjær 63' | Report | Granqvist (yellow card) 19'; Laborde 35'; Gazinskiy (yellow card) 62'; Bystrov (yellow card) 79'; Jędrzejczyk (yellow card) 84' | Stadium: Stade Pierre-Mauroy; Attendance: 27,000; Referee: Liran Liany (Israel) |

| 2 October 2014 2 | Krasnodar (Russia) | 1 – 1 | (England) Everton | Krasnodar, Russia |
| 20:00 MSK (UTC+4) | Ari 43' | Report | Eto'o 82'; Lukaku (yellow card) 90+3' | Stadium: Kuban Stadium; Attendance: 31,050; Referee: Hüseyin Göçek (Turkey) |

| 23 October 2014 3 | Krasnodar (Russia) | 2 – 4 | (Germany) Wolfsburg | Krasnodar, Russia |
| 20:00 MSK (UTC+4) | Granqvist 51' (pen.); Sigurðsson (yellow card) 56'; Laborde (yellow card) 73'; Wánderson 86' | Report | Granqvist 37' (o.g.); De Bruyne 46', 80'; Naldo (yellow card) 51'; Luiz Gustavo 64' | Stadium: Kuban Stadium; Attendance: 26,000; Referee: Artur Soares Dias (Portugal) |

| 6 November 2014 4 | Wolfsburg (Germany) | 5 – 1 | (Russia) Krasnodar | Wolfsburg, Germany |
| 23:05 MSK (UTC+3) | Hunt 47', 57'; De Bruyne (yellow card) 63'; Guilavogui 73'; Bendtner 89' (pen.), 90+1' | Report | Laborde (yellow card) 39'; Wánderson 72'; Sigurðsson (yellow card) 85' | Stadium: Volkswagen Arena; Attendance: 16,674; Referee: Pol van Boekel (Netherlands) |

| 27 November 2014 5 | Krasnodar (Russia) | 1 – 1 | (France) Lille | Krasnodar, Russia |
| 20:00 MSK (UTC+3) | Ari 35'; Pereyra (yellow card) 56'; Petrov (yellow card) 86'; Wánderson (yellow card) 90+4' | Report | Gueye (yellow card) 65'; Roux 79' (yellow card) 84'; Baša (yellow card) 90' | Stadium: Kuban Stadium; Attendance: 15,000; Referee: Ivan Kružliak (Slovakia) |

| 11 December 2014 6 | Everton (England) | 0 – 1 | (Russia) Krasnodar | Liverpool, England |
| 23:05 MSK (UTC+3) | Koné (yellow card) 43'; Pienaar (yellow card) 60' | Report | Granqvist (yellow card) 2'; Laborde 30'; Sigurðsson (yellow card) 81' | Stadium: Goodison Park; Referee: István Kovács (Romania) |

== Squad statistics ==
As of match played 30 May 2015

=== Appearances and goals ===
| No. | Pos | Nat | Player | Total | | Premier League | | Russian Cup | | Europa League | |
| No. | Pos | Nat | Player | Apps | Goals | Apps | Goals | Apps | Goals | Apps | Goals |
|---|---|---|---|---|---|---|---|---|---|---|---|
| 4 | DF | (Belarus) BLR | Alyaksandr Martynovich | 17 | 0 | 10+1 | 0 | 2 | 0 | 3+1 | 0 |
| 5 | DF | (Poland) POL | Artur Jędrzejczyk | 25 | 0 | 14 | 0 | 2 | 0 | 9 | 0 |
| 6 | DF | (Sweden) SWE | Andreas Granqvist | 38 | 1 | 27 | 0 | 1+1 | 0 | 9 | 1 |
| 7 | MF | (Russia) RUS | Pavel Mamayev | 26 | 4 | 20+1 | 4 | 1 | 0 | 2+2 | 0 |
| 8 | MF | (Russia) RUS | Yuri Gazinskiy | 33 | 1 | 18+2 | 0 | 2 | 0 | 11 | 1 |
| 9 | FW | (Brazil) BRA | Ari | 39 | 14 | 19+8 | 7 | 1+1 | 1 | 9+1 | 6 |
| 10 | MF | (Uzbekistan) UZB | Odil Ahmedov | 36 | 3 | 26 | 2 | 0+1 | 0 | 8+1 | 1 |
| 11 | MF | (Russia) RUS | Marat Izmailov | 31 | 1 | 15+7 | 1 | 1 | 0 | 7+1 | 0 |
| 14 | FW | (Brazil) BRA | Wánderson | 43 | 13 | 14+16 | 7 | 1 | 1 | 6+6 | 5 |
| 15 | MF | (Russia) RUS | Roman Shirokov | 12 | 4 | 12 | 4 | 0 | 0 | 0 | 0 |
| 16 | MF | (Russia) RUS | Aleksei Pomerko | 5 | 0 | 1 | 0 | 0 | 0 | 3+1 | 0 |
| 17 | DF | (Russia) RUS | Vitali Kaleshin | 34 | 2 | 24 | 2 | 1 | 0 | 9 | 0 |
| 18 | MF | (Russia) RUS | Vladimir Bystrov | 24 | 5 | 5+14 | 3 | 0 | 0 | 2+3 | 2 |
| 20 | MF | (Russia) RUS | Ruslan Adzhindzhal | 13 | 0 | 1+8 | 0 | 2 | 0 | 0+2 | 0 |
| 21 | MF | (Colombia) COL | Ricardo Laborde | 37 | 7 | 5+20 | 4 | 0 | 0 | 8+4 | 3 |
| 22 | MF | (Brazil) BRA | Joãozinho | 29 | 11 | 18+1 | 6 | 2 | 2 | 7+1 | 3 |
| 27 | DF | (Iceland) ISL | Ragnar Sigurðsson | 39 | 1 | 24+2 | 1 | 1+1 | 0 | 11 | 0 |
| 31 | GK | (Ukraine) UKR | Andriy Dykan | 33 | 0 | 25 | 0 | 0 | 0 | 8 | 0 |
| 33 | MF | (Uruguay) URU | Mauricio Pereyra | 38 | 11 | 26+1 | 9 | 0 | 0 | 11 | 2 |
| 76 | MF | (Russia) RUS | Aleksandr Ageyev | 3 | 1 | 0 | 0 | 0+1 | 1 | 0+2 | 0 |
| 88 | GK | (Russia) RUS | Andrei Sinitsyn | 12 | 0 | 5+1 | 0 | 2 | 0 | 4 | 0 |
| 98 | MF | (Russia) RUS | Sergei Petrov | 31 | 2 | 17+4 | 1 | 2 | 1 | 5+3 | 0 |
Players away from the club on loan:
| 2 | DF | (Uzbekistan) UZB | Nikolay Markov | 2 | 0 | 0 | 0 | 0 | 0 | 1+1 | 0 |
| 19 | FW | (Russia) RUS | Nikita Burmistrov | 10 | 1 | 2+3 | 0 | 1 | 0 | 2+2 | 1 |
| 63 | FW | (Russia) RUS | Nikolay Komlichenko | 1 | 0 | 0 | 0 | 0+1 | 0 | 0 | 0 |
Players who appeared for Krasnodar no longer at the club:
| 77 | FW | (Senegal) SEN | Moussa Konaté | 1 | 2 | 0 | 0 | 0 | 0 | 1 | 2 |

=== Goal Scorers ===
| Place | Position | Nation | Number | Name | Russian Premier League | Russian Cup | UEFA Europa League | Total |
|---|---|---|---|---|---|---|---|---|
| 1 | FW | (Brazil) | 9 | Ari | 7 | 1 | 6 | 14 |
| 2 | FW | (Brazil) | 14 | Wánderson | 7 | 1 | 5 | 13 |
| 3 | MF | (Brazil) | 22 | Joãozinho | 6 | 2 | 3 | 11 |
| 3 | MF | (Uruguay) | 33 | Mauricio Pereyra | 9 | 0 | 2 | 11 |
| 5 | MF | (Colombia) | 21 | Ricardo Laborde | 4 | 0 | 3 | 7 |
| 6 | MF | (Russia) | 18 | Vladimir Bystrov | 3 | 0 | 2 | 5 |
| 7 | MF | (Russia) | 7 | Pavel Mamayev | 4 | 0 | 0 | 4 |
| 7 | MF | (Russia) | 15 | Roman Shirokov | 4 | 0 | 0 | 4 |
| 9 | MF | (Uzbekistan) | 10 | Odil Ahmedov | 2 | 0 | 1 | 3 |
| 10 | MF | (Russia) | 98 | Sergei Petrov | 1 | 1 | 0 | 2 |
| 10 | FW | (Senegal) | 77 | Moussa Konaté | 0 | 0 | 2 | 2 |
| 10 | DF | (Russia) | 17 | Vitali Kaleshin | 2 | 0 | 0 | 2 |
| 13 | MF | (Russia) | 11 | Marat Izmailov | 1 | 0 | 0 | 1 |
| 13 | DF | (Iceland) | 27 | Ragnar Sigurðsson | 1 | 0 | 0 | 1 |
| 13 | | | | Own goal | 1 | 0 | 0 | 1 |
| 13 | MF | (Russia) | 76 | Aleksandr Ageyev | 0 | 1 | 0 | 1 |
| 13 | MF | (Russia) | 8 | Yuri Gazinskiy | 0 | 0 | 1 | 1 |
| 13 | FW | (Russia) | 19 | Nikita Burmistrov | 0 | 0 | 1 | 1 |
| 13 | DF | (Sweden) | 6 | Andreas Granqvist | 0 | 0 | 1 | 1 |
| | | | | TOTALS | 51 | 6 | 26 | 83 |

=== Disciplinary record ===
| Number | Nation | Position | Name | Russian Premier League | | Russian Cup | | UEFA Europa League | | Total | |
| Number | Nation | Position | Name | Yellow card | Red card | Yellow card | Red card | Yellow card | Red card | Yellow card | Red card |
| 4 | (Belarus) | DF | Alyaksandr Martynovich | 1 | 0 | 1 | 0 | 0 | 0 | 2 | 0 |
| 5 | (Poland) | DF | Artur Jędrzejczyk | 2 | 0 | 0 | 0 | 2 | 0 | 4 | 0 |
| 6 | (Sweden) | DF | Andreas Granqvist | 5 | 0 | 0 | 0 | 3 | 0 | 8 | 0 |
| 7 | (Russia) | MF | Pavel Mamayev | 2 | 0 | 1 | 0 | 0 | 0 | 3 | 0 |
| 8 | (Russia) | MF | Yuri Gazinskiy | 5 | 0 | 0 | 0 | 1 | 0 | 6 | 0 |
| 9 | (Brazil) | FW | Ari | 5 | 0 | 0 | 0 | 0 | 0 | 5 | 0 |
| 10 | (Uzbekistan) | MF | Odil Ahmedov | 3 | 0 | 0 | 0 | 0 | 0 | 3 | 0 |
| 11 | (Russia) | MF | Marat Izmailov | 6 | 0 | 0 | 0 | 0 | 0 | 6 | 0 |
| 14 | (Brazil) | FW | Wánderson | 0 | 0 | 0 | 0 | 1 | 0 | 1 | 0 |
| 15 | (Russia) | MF | Roman Shirokov | 1 | 0 | 0 | 0 | 0 | 0 | 1 | 0 |
| 16 | (Russia) | MF | Aleksei Pomerko | 1 | 0 | 0 | 0 | 0 | 0 | 1 | 0 |
| 17 | (Russia) | DF | Vitali Kaleshin | 6 | 0 | 0 | 0 | 0 | 0 | 6 | 0 |
| 18 | (Russia) | MF | Vladimir Bystrov | 3 | 0 | 0 | 0 | 1 | 0 | 4 | 0 |
| 21 | (Colombia) | MF | Ricardo Laborde | 8 | 0 | 0 | 0 | 3 | 0 | 11 | 0 |
| 22 | (Brazil) | MF | Joãozinho | 0 | 0 | 1 | 0 | 0 | 1 | 1 | 1 |
| 27 | (Iceland) | DF | Ragnar Sigurðsson | 4 | 0 | 0 | 0 | 3 | 0 | 7 | 0 |
| 31 | (Ukraine) | GK | Andriy Dykan | 2 | 0 | 0 | 0 | 0 | 0 | 2 | 0 |
| 33 | (Uruguay) | MF | Mauricio Pereyra | 4 | 0 | 0 | 0 | 1 | 0 | 5 | 0 |
| 98 | (Russia) | MF | Sergei Petrov | 1 | 0 | 0 | 0 | 1 | 0 | 2 | 0 |
| | | | TOTALS | 59 | 0 | 3 | 0 | 16 | 1 | 78 | 1 |

== Notes ==
- MSK time changed from UTC+4 to UTC+3 permanently on 26 October 2014.
