= 2014–15 UEFA Europa League group stage =

International football competition

The 2014–15 UEFA Europa League group stage was played from 18 September to 11 December 2014. A total of 48 teams competed in the group stage to decide 24 of the 32 places in the knockout phase of the 2014–15 UEFA Europa League.

== Draw ==
The draw was held on 29 August 2014, 13:00 CEST, at the Grimaldi Forum in Monaco. The 48 teams were allocated into four pots based on their UEFA club coefficients at the beginning of the season, with the title holders being placed in Pot 1 automatically. They were drawn into twelve groups of four containing one team from each of the four seeding pots, with the restriction that teams from the same national association could not be drawn against each other. Moreover, the draw was controlled for teams from the same association in order to split the teams evenly into the two sets of groups (A–F, G–L) for maximum television coverage.

The fixtures are decided after the draw. On each matchday, six groups play their matches at 19:00 CEST/CET, while the other six groups play their matches at 21:05 CEST/CET, with the two sets of groups (A–F, G–L) alternating between each matchday. There are other restrictions: for example, teams from the same city in general do not play at home on the same matchday (UEFA tries to avoid teams from the same city playing at home on the same day), and Russian teams do not play at home on the last matchday due to cold weather.

On 17 July 2014, the UEFA emergency panel ruled that Ukrainian and Russian clubs would not be drawn against each other "until further notice" due to the political unrest between the countries. Therefore, Ukrainian clubs Dynamo Kyiv, Metalist Kharkiv (both Pot 1) and Dnipro Dnipropetrovsk (Pot 2), and Russian clubs Dynamo Moscow and Krasnodar (both Pot 4) could not be drawn into the same group despite being in different pots.

== Teams ==
Below were the 48 teams which qualified for the group stage (with their 2014 UEFA club coefficients), grouped by their seeding pot. They include 7 teams which enter in this stage, the 31 winners of the play-off round, and the 10 losers of the Champions League play-off round.

Key to colours
Group winners and runners-up advanced to the round of 32

Pot 1
Team	Notes	Coeff
(Spain) Sevilla		71.042
(Italy) Internazionale		95.387
(England) Tottenham Hotspur		75.949
(Netherlands) PSV Eindhoven		64.862
(Italy) Napoli		61.387
(Ukraine) Dynamo Kyiv		56.193
(Spain) Villarreal		53.542
(Italy) Fiorentina		49.387
(Austria) Red Bull Salzburg		46.185
(Ukraine) Metalist Kharkiv		45.693
(France) Lille		45.300
(Denmark) Copenhagen		45.260

Pot 2
Team	Notes	Coeff
(Romania) Steaua București		39.451
(Belgium) Standard Liège		38.260
(Greece) PAOK		37.720
(Scotland) Celtic		36.813
(Turkey) Beşiktaş		32.840
(Germany) VfL Wolfsburg		32.328
(Belgium) Club Brugge		32.260
(Ukraine) Dnipro Dnipropetrovsk		32.193
(Turkey) Trabzonspor		31.340
(Greece) Panathinaikos		30.220
(Czech Republic) Sparta Prague		28.870
(Germany) Borussia Mönchengladbach		25.328

Pot 3
Team	Notes	Coeff
(England) Everton		24.949
(Switzerland) Young Boys		24.145
(Croatia) Dinamo Zagreb		23.925
(Switzerland) Zürich		18.645
(Portugal) Estoril		15.459
(Poland) Legia Warsaw		15.275
(Serbia) Partizan		14.825
(Italy) Torino		13.387
(Netherlands) Feyenoord		13.362
(France) Guingamp		12.800
(France) Saint-Étienne		12.800
(Portugal) Rio Ave		12.459

Pot 4
Team	Notes	Coeff
(Russia) Dynamo Moscow		12.399
(Russia) Krasnodar		9.399
(Croatia) Rijeka		8.925
(Belgium) Lokeren		8.760
(Greece) Asteras Tripolis		8.720
(Slovakia) Slovan Bratislava		8.700
(Cyprus) Apollon Limassol		8.650
(Azerbaijan) Qarabağ		7.575
(Finland) HJK		7.435
(Romania) Astra Giurgiu		6.951
(Belarus) Dinamo Minsk		6.725
(Denmark) AaB		5.260

Notes

1. ^{TH} Title holders, automatically placed at the top position of seeding list.
2. ^{EL-PO} Winners of the play-off round.
3. ^{CL-CR} Losers of the Champions League play-off round (Champions Route).
4. ^{CL-LR} Losers of the Champions League play-off round (League Route).

== Format ==
In each group, teams played against each other home-and-away in a round-robin format. The group winners and runners-up advanced to the round of 32, where they were joined by the eight third-placed teams from the Champions League group stage.

=== Tiebreakers ===
The teams were ranked according to points (3 points for a win, 1 point for a draw, 0 points for a loss). If two or more teams were equal on points on completion of the group matches, the following criteria were applied to determine the rankings:

1. higher number of points obtained in the group matches played among the teams in question;
2. superior goal difference from the group matches played among the teams in question;
3. higher number of goals scored in the group matches played among the teams in question;
4. higher number of goals scored away from home in the group matches played among the teams in question;
5. If, after applying criteria 1 to 4 to several teams, two or more teams still have an equal ranking, criteria 1 to 4 are reapplied exclusively to the matches between the teams in question to determine their final rankings. If this procedure does not lead to a decision, criteria 6 to 8 apply;
6. superior goal difference from all group matches played;
7. higher number of goals scored from all group matches played;
8. higher number of coefficient points accumulated by the club in question, as well as its association, over the previous five seasons.

== Groups ==
The matchdays were 18 September, 2 October, 23 October (one home match of Metalist Kharkiv played on 22 October), 6 November, 27 November, and 11 December 2014. The match kickoff times were 19:00 and 21:05 CEST/CET, except for matches in Russia and Azerbaijan and one home match each of Dnipro Dnipropetrovsk and Metalist Kharkiv which were 18:00 CEST/CET, and two home matches of Dynamo Moscow which were 17:00 CEST/CET. Times up to 25 October 2014 (matchdays 1–3) were CEST (UTC+2), thereafter (matchdays 4–6) times were CET (UTC+1).

=== Group A ===
Pos	Team	Pld	W	D	L	GF	GA	GD	Pts	Qualification	MGB	VIL	ZUR	APL
1	(Germany) Borussia Mönchengladbach	6	3	3	0	14	4	+10	12	Advance to knockout phase	—	1–1	3–0	5–0
2	(Spain) Villarreal	6	3	2	1	15	7	+8	11	Advance to knockout phase	2–2	—	4–1	4–0
3	(Switzerland) Zürich	6	2	1	3	10	14	−4	7		1–1	3–2	—	3–1
4	(Cyprus) Apollon Limassol	6	1	0	5	4	18	−14	3		0–2	0–2	3–2	—

Source: Soccerway
Rules for classification: Group stage tiebreakers
18 September 2014
19:00

Borussia Mönchengladbach (Germany)	1–1	(Spain) Villarreal
Herrmann 21'	Report	Uche 68'

Stadion im Borussia-Park, Mönchengladbach
Attendance: 39,128
Referee: Ivan Kružliak (Slovakia)
18 September 2014
19:00

Apollon Limassol (Cyprus)	3–2	(Switzerland) Zürich
Papoulis 9'; Gullón 40'; P. Koch 87' (o.g.)	Report	Rikan 50'; Yapi Yapo 53'

GSP Stadium, Nicosia (Note: Apollon Limassol played their home matches at GSP Stadium, Nicosia instead of their regular stadium, Tsirion Stadium, Limassol.)
Attendance: 5,662
Referee: Simon Lee Evans (Wales)

2 October 2014
21:05

Zürich (Switzerland)	1–1	(Germany) Borussia Mönchengladbach
Etoundi 23'	Report	Nordtveit 25'

Letzigrund, Zürich
Attendance: 18,422
Referee: Slavko Vinčić (Slovenia)
2 October 2014
21:05

Villarreal (Spain)	4–0	(Cyprus) Apollon Limassol
Gerard 9', 82'; Espinosa 44', 51'	Report

El Madrigal, Villarreal
Attendance: 12,630
Referee: Arnold Hunter (Northern Ireland)

23 October 2014
21:05

Villarreal (Spain)	4–1	(Switzerland) Zürich
Cani 6'; Vietto 57'; Bruno 60'; G. dos Santos 78'	Report	Schönbächler 43'

El Madrigal, Villarreal
Attendance: 14,092
Referee: Halis Özkahya (Turkey)
23 October 2014
21:05

Borussia Mönchengladbach (Germany)	5–0	(Cyprus) Apollon Limassol
Traoré 11', 67'; Hrgota 56'; Herrmann 83'; Angelis 90+1' (o.g.)	Report

Stadion im Borussia-Park, Mönchengladbach
Attendance: 38,182
Referee: Yevhen Aranovskiy (Ukraine)

6 November 2014
19:00

Zürich (Switzerland)	3–2	(Spain) Villarreal
Etoundi 21'; Buff 26'; Chikhaoui 29'	Report	Pina 19'; Gerard 23'

Letzigrund, Zürich
Attendance: 8,209
Referee: Vladislav Bezborodov (Russia)
6 November 2014
19:00

Apollon Limassol (Cyprus)	0–2	(Germany) Borussia Mönchengladbach
	Report	Raffael 56'; Herrmann 90+5'

GSP Stadium, Nicosia
Attendance: 5,258
Referee: Antony Gautier (France)

27 November 2014
21:05

Villarreal (Spain)	2–2	(Germany) Borussia Mönchengladbach
Vietto 26'; Cheryshev 63'	Report	Raffael 55'; Xhaka 67'

El Madrigal, Villarreal
Attendance: 16,000
Referee: Szymon Marciniak (Poland)
27 November 2014
21:05

Zürich (Switzerland)	3–1	(Cyprus) Apollon Limassol
Djimsiti 32'; Chikhaoui 39' (pen.), 59' (pen.)	Report	Farley 23'

Letzigrund, Zürich
Attendance: 7,939
Referee: Kristo Tohver (Estonia)

11 December 2014
19:00

Borussia Mönchengladbach (Germany)	3–0	(Switzerland) Zürich
Herrmann 31'; Hrgota 59', 64'	Report

Stadion im Borussia-Park, Mönchengladbach
Attendance: 44,323
Referee: Luca Banti (Italy)
11 December 2014
19:00

Apollon Limassol (Cyprus)	0–2	(Spain) Villarreal
	Report	Gerard 35'; Vietto 40'

GSP Stadium, Nicosia
Attendance: 4,200
Referee: Serge Gumienny (Belgium)

=== Group B ===
Pos	Team	Pld	W	D	L	GF	GA	GD	Pts	Qualification	BRU	TOR	HJK	KOB
1	(Belgium) Club Brugge	6	3	3	0	10	2	+8	12	Advance to knockout phase	—	0–0	2–1	1–1
2	(Italy) Torino	6	3	2	1	9	3	+6	11	Advance to knockout phase	0–0	—	2–0	1–0
3	(Finland) HJK	6	2	0	4	5	11	−6	6		0–3	2–1	—	2–1
4	(Denmark) Copenhagen	6	1	1	4	5	13	−8	4		0–4	1–5	2–0	—

Source: Soccerway
Rules for classification: Group stage tiebreakers
18 September 2014
19:00

Club Brugge (Belgium)	0–0	(Italy) Torino
	Report

Jan Breydel Stadium, Bruges
Attendance: 11,894
Referee: Halis Özkahya (Turkey)
18 September 2014
19:00

Copenhagen (Denmark)	2–0	(Finland) HJK
N. Jørgensen 68', 81'	Report

Parken Stadium, Copenhagen
Attendance: 12,191
Referee: Yevhen Aranovskiy (Ukraine)

2 October 2014
21:05

HJK (Finland)	0–3	(Belgium) Club Brugge
	Report	Heikkinen 19' (o.g.); De Sutter 70'; De Bock 78'

Sonera Stadium, Helsinki
Attendance: 8,055
Referee: Ognjen Valjić (Bosnia and Herzegovina)
2 October 2014
21:05

Torino (Italy)	1–0	(Denmark) Copenhagen
Quagliarella 90+4' (pen.)	Report

Stadio Olimpico, Turin
Attendance: 13,734
Referee: Carlos Clos Gómez (Spain)

23 October 2014
21:05

Torino (Italy)	2–0	(Finland) HJK
Molinaro 35'; Amauri 58'	Report

Stadio Olimpico, Turin
Attendance: 14,759
Referee: Stephan Klossner (Switzerland)
23 October 2014
21:05

Club Brugge (Belgium)	1–1	(Denmark) Copenhagen
Vázquez 90+2'	Report	Amartey 89'

Jan Breydel Stadium, Bruges
Attendance: 13,999
Referee: Michael Oliver (England)

6 November 2014
19:00

HJK (Finland)	2–1	(Italy) Torino
Baah 60'; Moren 81'	Report	Quagliarella 90'

Sonera Stadium, Helsinki
Attendance: 6,562
Referee: Arnold Hunter (Northern Ireland)
6 November 2014
19:00

Copenhagen (Denmark)	0–4	(Belgium) Club Brugge
	Report	Refaelov 7', 30', 36'; Vormer 60'

Parken Stadium, Copenhagen
Attendance: 14,810
Referee: Manuel Gräfe (Germany)

27 November 2014
21:05

Torino (Italy)	0–0	(Belgium) Club Brugge
	Report

Stadio Olimpico, Turin
Attendance: 15,102
Referee: Bas Nijhuis (Netherlands)
27 November 2014
21:05

HJK (Finland)	2–1	(Denmark) Copenhagen
Baah 29'; Kandji 90+3'	Report	Nilsson 90'

Sonera Stadium, Helsinki
Attendance: 6,752
Referee: Tony Chapron (France)

11 December 2014
19:00

Club Brugge (Belgium)	2–1	(Finland) HJK
Felipe Gedoz 28' (pen.); Refaelov 88'	Report	Kandji 51'

Jan Breydel Stadium, Bruges
Attendance: 11,894
Referee: Sergei Karasev (Russia)
11 December 2014
19:00

Copenhagen (Denmark)	1–5	(Italy) Torino
Amartey 6'	Report	Martínez 15', 47'; Amauri 42' (pen.); Darmian 49'; Silva 53'

Parken Stadium, Copenhagen
Attendance: 9,202
Referee: Vladislav Bezborodov (Russia)

=== Group C ===
Pos	Team	Pld	W	D	L	GF	GA	GD	Pts	Qualification	BES	TOT	AT	PAR
1	(Turkey) Beşiktaş	6	3	3	0	11	5	+6	12	Advance to knockout phase	—	1–0	1–1	2–1
2	(England) Tottenham Hotspur	6	3	2	1	9	4	+5	11	Advance to knockout phase	1–1	—	5–1	1–0
3	(Greece) Asteras Tripolis	6	1	3	2	7	10	−3	6		2–2	1–2	—	2–0
4	(Serbia) Partizan	6	0	2	4	1	9	−8	2		0–4	0–0	0–0	—

Source: Soccerway
Rules for classification: Group stage tiebreakers
18 September 2014
19:00

Partizan (Serbia)	0–0	(England) Tottenham Hotspur
	Report

Partizan Stadium, Belgrade
Attendance: 22,112
Referee: Alon Yefet (Israel)
18 September 2014
19:00

Beşiktaş (Turkey)	1–1	(Greece) Asteras Tripolis
Töre 33'	Report	Parra 88'

Atatürk Olympic Stadium, Istanbul
Attendance: 7,760
Referee: Miroslav Zelinka (Czech Republic)

2 October 2014
21:05

Asteras Tripolis (Greece)	2–0	(Serbia) Partizan
Usero 22'; Parra 52'	Report

Theodoros Kolokotronis Stadium, Tripoli
Attendance: 3,601
Referee: Danny Makkelie (Netherlands)
2 October 2014
21:05

Tottenham Hotspur (England)	1–1	(Turkey) Beşiktaş
Kane 27'	Report	Ba 89' (pen.)

White Hart Lane, London
Attendance: 24,300
Referee: Manuel Gräfe (Germany)

23 October 2014
21:05

Tottenham Hotspur (England)	5–1	(Greece) Asteras Tripolis
Kane 13', 74', 81'; Lamela 30', 66'	Report	Barrales 89'

White Hart Lane, London
Attendance: 21,428
Referee: Ivan Kružliak (Slovakia)
23 October 2014
21:05

Partizan (Serbia)	0–4	(Turkey) Beşiktaş
	Report	Kavlak 18'; Ba 45'; Özyakup 52'; Töre 54'

Partizan Stadium, Belgrade
Attendance: 7,855
Referee: Paolo Mazzoleni (Italy)

6 November 2014
19:00

Asteras Tripolis (Greece)	1–2	(England) Tottenham Hotspur
Barrales 90' (pen.)	Report	Townsend 36' (pen.); Kane 42'

Theodoros Kolokotronis Stadium, Tripoli
Attendance: 5,130
Referee: Javier Estrada Fernández (Spain)
6 November 2014
19:00

Beşiktaş (Turkey)	2–1	(Serbia) Partizan
Ba 57' (pen.), 62'	Report	Marković 78'

Atatürk Olympic Stadium, Istanbul
Attendance: 11,938
Referee: Alexandru Tudor (Romania)

27 November 2014
21:05

Tottenham Hotspur (England)	1–0	(Serbia) Partizan
Stambouli 49'	Report

White Hart Lane, London
Attendance: 28,362
Referee: Yevhen Aranovskiy (Ukraine)
27 November 2014
21:05

Asteras Tripolis (Greece)	2–2	(Turkey) Beşiktaş
Barrales 72'; Parra 83'	Report	Ba 15'; Töre 61' (pen.)

Theodoros Kolokotronis Stadium, Tripoli
Attendance: 2,858
Referee: Jorge Sousa (Portugal)

11 December 2014
19:00

Partizan (Serbia)	0–0	(Greece) Asteras Tripolis
	Report

Partizan Stadium, Belgrade
Attendance: 6,750
Referee: Paweł Gil (Poland)
11 December 2014
19:00

Beşiktaş (Turkey)	1–0	(England) Tottenham Hotspur
Tosun 59'	Report

Atatürk Olympic Stadium, Istanbul
Attendance: 19,511
Referee: Stefan Johannesson (Sweden)

=== Group D ===
Pos	Team	Pld	W	D	L	GF	GA	GD	Pts	Qualification	SAL	CEL	DZG	AG
1	(Austria) Red Bull Salzburg	6	5	1	0	21	8	+13	16	Advance to knockout phase	—	2–2	4–2	5–1
2	(Scotland) Celtic	6	2	2	2	10	11	−1	8	Advance to knockout phase	1–3	—	1–0	2–1
3	(Croatia) Dinamo Zagreb	6	2	0	4	12	15	−3	6		1–5	4–3	—	5–1
4	(Romania) Astra Giurgiu	6	1	1	4	6	15	−9	4		1–2	1–1	1–0	—

Source: Soccerway
Rules for classification: Group stage tiebreakers
18 September 2014
19:00

Red Bull Salzburg (Austria)	2–2	(Scotland) Celtic
Alan 36'; Soriano 78'	Report	Wakaso 14'; Brown 60'

Red Bull Arena, Wals-Siezenheim
Attendance: 17,886
Referee: Artur Soares Dias (Portugal)
18 September 2014
19:00

Dinamo Zagreb (Croatia)	5–1	(Romania) Astra Giurgiu
Soudani 17', 24', 45+1'; Henríquez 70'; Ćorić 90+2'	Report	Chițu 82'

Stadion Maksimir, Zagreb
Attendance: 10,383
Referee: Leontios Trattou (Cyprus)

2 October 2014
21:05

Astra Giurgiu (Romania)	1–2	(Austria) Red Bull Salzburg
Seto 15'	Report	Kampl 36'; Soriano 42'

Stadionul Marin Anastasovici, Giurgiu
Attendance: 3,298
Referee: Libor Kovařík (Czech Republic)
2 October 2014
21:05

Celtic (Scotland)	1–0	(Croatia) Dinamo Zagreb
Commons 6'	Report

Celtic Park, Glasgow
Attendance: 28,132
Referee: Sébastien Delferiere (Belgium)

23 October 2014
21:05

Celtic (Scotland)	2–1	(Romania) Astra Giurgiu
Šćepović 73'; Johansen 79'	Report	Enache 81'

Celtic Park, Glasgow
Attendance: 28,281
Referee: Kristinn Jakobsson (Iceland)
23 October 2014
21:05

Red Bull Salzburg (Austria)	4–2	(Croatia) Dinamo Zagreb
Alan 14', 45', 52'; Ramalho 49'	Report	Ademi 81'; Henríquez 89'

Red Bull Arena, Wals-Siezenheim
Attendance: 12,872
Referee: Serdar Gözübüyük (Netherlands)

6 November 2014
19:00

Astra Giurgiu (Romania)	1–1	(Scotland) Celtic
William 79'	Report	Johansen 32'

Stadionul Marin Anastasovici, Giurgiu
Attendance: 3,400
Referee: Serhiy Boyko (Ukraine)
6 November 2014
19:00

Dinamo Zagreb (Croatia)	1–5	(Austria) Red Bull Salzburg
Henríquez 60'	Report	Soriano 40', 64', 85'; Kampl 59'; Bruno 72'

Stadion Maksimir, Zagreb
Attendance: 10,769
Referee: Michael Koukoulakis (Greece)

27 November 2014
21:05

Celtic (Scotland)	1–3	(Austria) Red Bull Salzburg
Johansen 30'	Report	Alan 8', 13'; Keïta 90+2'

Celtic Park, Glasgow
Attendance: 32,414
Referee: Halis Özkahya (Turkey)
27 November 2014
21:05

Astra Giurgiu (Romania)	1–0	(Croatia) Dinamo Zagreb
Bukari 50'	Report

Stadionul Marin Anastasovici, Giurgiu
Attendance: 2,520
Referee: Sergey Lapochkin (Russia)

11 December 2014
19:00

Red Bull Salzburg (Austria)	5–1	(Romania) Astra Giurgiu
Sabitzer 9'; Kampl 34', 90+2'; Alan 46', 70'	Report	Florescu 51'

Red Bull Arena, Wals-Siezenheim
Attendance: 8,258
Referee: Paweł Raczkowski (Poland)
11 December 2014
19:00

Dinamo Zagreb (Croatia)	4–3	(Scotland) Celtic
Pjaca 14', 40', 50'; Brozović 48'	Report	Commons 23'; Šćepović 30'; Pivarić 82' (o.g.)

Stadion Maksimir, Zagreb
Attendance: 4,054
Referee: Gediminas Mažeika (Lithuania)

=== Group E ===
Pos	Team	Pld	W	D	L	GF	GA	GD	Pts	Qualification	DYM	PSV	EST	PAN
1	(Russia) Dynamo Moscow	6	6	0	0	9	3	+6	18	Advance to knockout phase	—	1–0	1–0	2–1
2	(Netherlands) PSV Eindhoven	6	2	2	2	8	8	0	8	Advance to knockout phase	0–1	—	1–0	1–1
3	(Portugal) Estoril	6	1	2	3	7	8	−1	5		1–2	3–3	—	2–0
4	(Greece) Panathinaikos	6	0	2	4	6	11	−5	2		1–2	2–3	1–1	—

Source: Soccerway
Rules for classification: Group stage tiebreakers
18 September 2014
19:00

PSV Eindhoven (Netherlands)	1–0	(Portugal) Estoril
De Jong 26' (pen.)	Report

Philips Stadion, Eindhoven
Attendance: 14,200
Referee: Bobby Madden (Scotland)
18 September 2014
19:00

Panathinaikos (Greece)	1–2	(Russia) Dynamo Moscow
Dinas 63'	Report	Kokorin 40'; Ionov 49'

Leoforos Alexandras Stadium, Athens
Attendance: 13,073
Referee: Daniele Orsato (Italy)

2 October 2014
17:00

Dynamo Moscow (Russia)	1–0	(Netherlands) PSV Eindhoven
Zhirkov 90+3'	Report

Arena Khimki, Khimki
Attendance: 7,872
Referee: Marcin Borski (Poland)
2 October 2014
21:05

Estoril (Portugal)	2–0	(Greece) Panathinaikos
Kléber 52'; Amado 66'	Report

Estádio António Coimbra da Mota, Estoril
Attendance: 1,925
Referee: Serge Gumienny (Belgium)

23 October 2014
21:05

Estoril (Portugal)	1–2	(Russia) Dynamo Moscow
Tavares 90+5'	Report	Kokorin 52'; Zhirkov 80'

Estádio António Coimbra da Mota, Estoril
Attendance: 2,164
Referee: Alon Yefet (Israel)
23 October 2014
21:05

PSV Eindhoven (Netherlands)	1–1	(Greece) Panathinaikos
Memphis 44'	Report	Karelis 87'

Philips Stadion, Eindhoven
Attendance: 21,800
Referee: Miroslav Zelinka (Czech Republic)

6 November 2014
18:00

Dynamo Moscow (Russia)	1–0	(Portugal) Estoril
Kurányi 77'	Report

Arena Khimki, Khimki
Attendance: 5,374
Referee: Mattias Gestranius (Finland)
6 November 2014
19:00

Panathinaikos (Greece)	2–3	(Netherlands) PSV Eindhoven
Ajagun 11'; Petrić 43'	Report	Memphis 27'; De Jong 65'; Wijnaldum 78'

Leoforos Alexandras Stadium, Athens
Attendance: 14,240
Referee: Marijo Strahonja (Croatia)

27 November 2014
17:00

Dynamo Moscow (Russia)	2–1	(Greece) Panathinaikos
Triantafyllopoulos 55' (o.g.); Ionov 61'	Report	Berg 14'

Arena Khimki, Khimki
Attendance: 4,207
Referee: Eitan Shemeulevitch (Israel)
27 November 2014 (Note: The match was abandoned at half-time due to heavy rainfall, and was resumed on 28 November 2014, 17:00 (16:00 UTC+0), from the point of abandonment.)
21:05

Estoril (Portugal)	3–3	(Netherlands) PSV Eindhoven
Tozé 12'; Kuca 30'; Amado 39'	Report	Memphis 6'; Narsingh 14'; Wijnaldum 82'

Estádio António Coimbra da Mota, Estoril
Attendance: 3,700
Referee: Martin Strömbergsson (Sweden)

11 December 2014
19:00

PSV Eindhoven (Netherlands)	0–1	(Russia) Dynamo Moscow
	Report	Ionov 90'

Philips Stadion, Eindhoven
Attendance: 25,000
Referee: István Vad (Hungary)
11 December 2014
19:00

Panathinaikos (Greece)	1–1	(Portugal) Estoril
Karelis 55'	Report	Kléber 87'

Leoforos Alexandras Stadium, Athens
Attendance: 8,200
Referee: Harald Lechner (Austria)

=== Group F ===
Pos	Team	Pld	W	D	L	GF	GA	GD	Pts	Qualification	INT	DNI	QAR	SET
1	(Italy) Internazionale	6	3	3	0	6	2	+4	12	Advance to knockout phase	—	2–1	2–0	0–0
2	(Ukraine) Dnipro Dnipropetrovsk	6	2	1	3	4	5	−1	7	Advance to knockout phase	0–1	—	0–1	1–0
3	(Azerbaijan) Qarabağ	6	1	3	2	3	5	−2	6		0–0	1–2	—	0–0
4	(France) Saint-Étienne	6	0	5	1	2	3	−1	5		1–1	0–0	1–1	—

Source: Soccerway
Rules for classification: Group stage tiebreakers
18 September 2014
18:00

Qarabağ (Azerbaijan)	0–0	(France) Saint-Étienne
	Report

Tofiq Bahramov Republican Stadium, Baku
Attendance: 28,786
Referee: Steven McLean (Scotland)
18 September 2014
19:00

Dnipro Dnipropetrovsk (Ukraine)	0–1	(Italy) Internazionale
	Report	D'Ambrosio 71'

Olympic Stadium, Kyiv (Note: Dnipro Dnipropetrovsk played their home matches at Olympic Stadium, Kyiv instead of their regular stadium, Dnipro-Arena, Dnipropetrovsk, due to the pro-Russian unrest in Ukraine.)
Attendance: 25,200
Referee: Felix Zwayer (Germany)

2 October 2014
21:05

Saint-Étienne (France)	0–0	(Ukraine) Dnipro Dnipropetrovsk
	Report

Stade Geoffroy-Guichard, Saint-Étienne
Attendance: 28,207
Referee: Alexandru Tudor (Romania)
2 October 2014
21:05

Internazionale (Italy)	2–0	(Azerbaijan) Qarabağ
D'Ambrosio 18'; Icardi 85'	Report

San Siro, Milan
Attendance: 28,435
Referee: Aleksei Kulbakov (Belarus)

23 October 2014
21:05

Internazionale (Italy)	0–0	(France) Saint-Étienne
	Report

San Siro, Milan
Attendance: 33,378
Referee: Anthony Taylor (England)
23 October 2014
21:05

Dnipro Dnipropetrovsk (Ukraine)	0–1	(Azerbaijan) Qarabağ
	Report	Muarem 21'

Olympic Stadium, Kyiv
Attendance: 3,120
Referee: Libor Kovařík (Czech Republic)

6 November 2014
18:00

Qarabağ (Azerbaijan)	1–2	(Ukraine) Dnipro Dnipropetrovsk
George 36'	Report	Kalinić 15', 73'

Tofiq Bahramov Republican Stadium, Baku
Attendance: 31,000
Referee: Paweł Gil (Poland)
6 November 2014
19:00

Saint-Étienne (France)	1–1	(Italy) Internazionale
Bayal Sall 50'	Report	Dodô 33'

Stade Geoffroy-Guichard, Saint-Étienne
Attendance: 36,411
Referee: Slavko Vinčić (Slovenia)

27 November 2014
21:05

Internazionale (Italy)	2–1	(Ukraine) Dnipro Dnipropetrovsk
Kuzmanović 30'; Osvaldo 50'	Report	Rotan 16'

San Siro, Milan
Attendance: 14,415
Referee: Bobby Madden (Scotland)
27 November 2014
21:05

Saint-Étienne (France)	1–1	(Azerbaijan) Qarabağ
Van Wolfswinkel 21'	Report	Nadirov 15'

Stade Geoffroy-Guichard, Saint-Étienne
Attendance: 29,769
Referee: Kristinn Jakobsson (Iceland)

11 December 2014
18:00

Dnipro Dnipropetrovsk (Ukraine)	1–0	(France) Saint-Étienne
Fedetskyi 66'	Report

Olympic Stadium, Kyiv
Attendance: 2,579
Referee: Marijo Strahonja (Croatia)
11 December 2014
18:00

Qarabağ (Azerbaijan)	0–0	(Italy) Internazionale
	Report

Tofiq Bahramov Republican Stadium, Baku
Attendance: 31,200
Referee: Miroslav Zelinka (Czech Republic)

=== Group G ===
Pos	Team	Pld	W	D	L	GF	GA	GD	Pts	Qualification	FEY	SEV	RIJ	STA
1	(Netherlands) Feyenoord	6	4	0	2	10	6	+4	12	Advance to knockout phase	—	2–0	2–0	2–1
2	(Spain) Sevilla	6	3	2	1	8	5	+3	11	Advance to knockout phase	2–0	—	1–0	3–1
3	(Croatia) Rijeka	6	2	1	3	7	8	−1	7		3–1	2–2	—	2–0
4	(Belgium) Standard Liège	6	1	1	4	4	10	−6	4		0–3	0–0	2–0	—

Source: Soccerway
Rules for classification: Group stage tiebreakers
18 September 2014
21:05

Standard Liège (Belgium)	2–0	(Croatia) Rijeka
Ciman 74'; Araújo 87'	Report

Stade Maurice Dufrasne, Liège
Attendance: 8,884
Referee: Cristian Balaj (Romania)
18 September 2014
21:05

Sevilla (Spain)	2–0	(Netherlands) Feyenoord
Krychowiak 8'; Mbia 31'	Report

Ramón Sánchez-Pizjuán, Seville
Attendance: 27,604
Referee: Ruddy Buquet (France)

2 October 2014
19:00

Feyenoord (Netherlands)	2–1	(Belgium) Standard Liège
Van Beek 47'; Manu 84'	Report	Viera 65'

De Kuip, Rotterdam
Attendance: 33,000
Referee: Jorge Sousa (Portugal)
2 October 2014
19:00

Rijeka (Croatia)	2–2	(Spain) Sevilla
Kramarić 53' (pen.); Kvržić 68'	Report	Aspas 26'; Mbia 90+1'

Stadion Kantrida, Rijeka
Attendance: 9,256
Referee: Kenn Hansen (Denmark)

23 October 2014
19:00

Rijeka (Croatia)	3–1	(Netherlands) Feyenoord
Kramarić 63', 71', 76' (pen.)	Report	Toornstra 66'

Stadion Kantrida, Rijeka
Attendance: 9,326
Referee: Tom Harald Hagen (Norway)
23 October 2014
19:00

Standard Liège (Belgium)	0–0	(Spain) Sevilla
	Report

Stade Maurice Dufrasne, Liège
Attendance: 10,365
Referee: Hüseyin Göçek (Turkey)

6 November 2014
21:05

Feyenoord (Netherlands)	2–0	(Croatia) Rijeka
El Ahmadi 8'; Immers 20'	Report

De Kuip, Rotterdam
Attendance: 30,800
Referee: Craig Thomson (Scotland)
6 November 2014
21:05

Sevilla (Spain)	3–1	(Belgium) Standard Liège
Gameiro 19'; Reyes 41'; Bacca 90'	Report	M'Poku 32'

Ramón Sánchez-Pizjuán, Seville
Attendance: 26,850
Referee: Bobby Madden (Scotland)

27 November 2014
19:00

Rijeka (Croatia)	2–0	(Belgium) Standard Liège
Moisés 26'; Kramarić 34' (pen.)	Report

Stadion Kantrida, Rijeka
Attendance: 8,950
Referee: Stephan Studer (Switzerland)
27 November 2014
19:00

Feyenoord (Netherlands)	2–0	(Spain) Sevilla
Toornstra 56'; El Ahmadi 83'	Report

De Kuip, Rotterdam
Attendance: 19,500
Referee: Slavko Vinčić (Slovenia)

11 December 2014
21:05

Standard Liège (Belgium)	0–3	(Netherlands) Feyenoord
	Report	Toornstra 16'; Boëtius 60'; Manu 88'

Stade Maurice Dufrasne, Liège
Attendance: 11,913
Referee: Alon Yefet (Israel)
11 December 2014
21:05

Sevilla (Spain)	1–0	(Croatia) Rijeka
Suárez 20'	Report

Ramón Sánchez-Pizjuán, Seville
Attendance: 24,967
Referee: Manuel Gräfe (Germany)

=== Group H ===
Pos	Team	Pld	W	D	L	GF	GA	GD	Pts	Qualification	EVE	WOL	KRA	LIL
1	(England) Everton	6	3	2	1	10	3	+7	11	Advance to knockout phase	—	4–1	0–1	3–0
2	(Germany) VfL Wolfsburg	6	3	1	2	14	10	+4	10	Advance to knockout phase	0–2	—	5–1	1–1
3	(Russia) Krasnodar	6	1	3	2	7	12	−5	6		1–1	2–4	—	1–1
4	(France) Lille	6	0	4	2	3	9	−6	4		0–0	0–3	1–1	—

Source: Soccerway
Rules for classification: Group stage tiebreakers
18 September 2014
21:05

Lille (France)	1–1	(Russia) Krasnodar
Kjær 63'	Report	Laborde 35'

Stade Pierre-Mauroy, Villeneuve-d'Ascq
Attendance: 25,465
Referee: Liran Liany (Israel)
18 September 2014
21:05

Everton (England)	4–1	(Germany) VfL Wolfsburg
Rodriguez 15' (o.g.); Coleman 45+1'; Baines 47' (pen.); Mirallas 89'	Report	Rodriguez 90+4'

Goodison Park, Liverpool
Attendance: 29,593
Referee: Luca Banti (Italy)

2 October 2014
18:00

Krasnodar (Russia)	1–1	(England) Everton
Ari 43'	Report	Eto'o 82'

Kuban Stadium, Krasnodar
Attendance: 31,050
Referee: Hüseyin Göçek (Turkey)
2 October 2014
19:00

VfL Wolfsburg (Germany)	1–1	(France) Lille
De Bruyne 82'	Report	Origi 77' (pen.)

Volkswagen Arena, Wolfsburg
Attendance: 16,097
Referee: Ovidiu Hațegan (Romania)

23 October 2014
18:00

Krasnodar (Russia)	2–4	(Germany) VfL Wolfsburg
Granqvist 51' (pen.); Wánderson 86'	Report	Granqvist 37' (o.g.); De Bruyne 46', 80'; Luiz Gustavo 64'

Kuban Stadium, Krasnodar
Attendance: 22,500
Referee: Artur Soares Dias (Portugal)
23 October 2014
19:00

Lille (France)	0–0	(England) Everton
	Report

Stade Pierre-Mauroy, Villeneuve-d'Ascq
Attendance: 41,057
Referee: Jorge Sousa (Portugal)

6 November 2014
21:05

VfL Wolfsburg (Germany)	5–1	(Russia) Krasnodar
Hunt 47', 57'; Guilavogui 73'; Bendtner 89' (pen.), 90+1'	Report	Wánderson 72'

Volkswagen Arena, Wolfsburg
Attendance: 16,674
Referee: Pol van Boekel (Netherlands)
6 November 2014
21:05

Everton (England)	3–0	(France) Lille
Osman 27'; Jagielka 42'; Naismith 61'	Report

Goodison Park, Liverpool
Attendance: 28,844
Referee: Bas Nijhuis (Netherlands)

27 November 2014
18:00

Krasnodar (Russia)	1–1	(France) Lille
Ari 35'	Report	Roux 79'

Kuban Stadium, Krasnodar
Attendance: 13,450
Referee: Ivan Kružliak (Slovakia)
27 November 2014
19:00

VfL Wolfsburg (Germany)	0–2	(England) Everton
	Report	Lukaku 43'; Mirallas 75'

Volkswagen Arena, Wolfsburg
Attendance: 23,375
Referee: Fernando Teixeira Vitienes (Spain)

11 December 2014
21:05

Lille (France)	0–3	(Germany) VfL Wolfsburg
	Report	Vieirinha 45+1'; Rodriguez 65', 89' (pen.)

Stade Pierre-Mauroy, Villeneuve-d'Ascq
Attendance: 33,559
Referee: Halis Özkahya (Turkey)
11 December 2014
21:05

Everton (England)	0–1	(Russia) Krasnodar
	Report	Laborde 30'

Goodison Park, Liverpool
Attendance: 20,260
Referee: István Kovács (Romania)

=== Group I ===
Pos	Team	Pld	W	D	L	GF	GA	GD	Pts	Qualification	NAP	YB	SPA	SLO
1	(Italy) Napoli	6	4	1	1	11	3	+8	13	Advance to knockout phase	—	3–0	3–1	3–0
2	(Switzerland) Young Boys	6	4	0	2	13	7	+6	12	Advance to knockout phase	2–0	—	2–0	5–0
3	(Czech Republic) Sparta Prague	6	3	1	2	11	6	+5	10		0–0	3–1	—	4–0
4	(Slovakia) Slovan Bratislava	6	0	0	6	1	20	−19	0		0–2	1–3	0–3	—

Source: Soccerway
Rules for classification: Group stage tiebreakers
18 September 2014
21:05

Young Boys (Switzerland)	5–0	(Slovakia) Slovan Bratislava
Lecjaks 5'; Steffen 29'; Nuzzolo 63'; Nikçi 80'; Hoarau 90+2'	Report

Stade de Suisse, Bern
Attendance: 10,010
Referee: Artyom Kuchin (Kazakhstan)
18 September 2014
21:05

Napoli (Italy)	3–1	(Czech Republic) Sparta Prague
Higuaín 23' (pen.); Mertens 51', 81'	Report	Hušbauer 14'

Stadio San Paolo, Naples
Attendance: 14,933
Referee: Kevin Blom (Netherlands)

2 October 2014
19:00

Sparta Prague (Czech Republic)	3–1	(Switzerland) Young Boys
Vácha 27'; Lafata 28', 85'	Report	Hoarau 52'

Generali Arena, Prague
Attendance: 10,205
Referee: Michael Koukoulakis (Greece)
2 October 2014
19:00

Slovan Bratislava (Slovakia)	0–2	(Italy) Napoli
	Report	Hamšík 35'; Higuaín 74'

Štadión Pasienky, Bratislava
Attendance: 10,738
Referee: Marijo Strahonja (Croatia)

23 October 2014
19:00

Slovan Bratislava (Slovakia)	0–3	(Czech Republic) Sparta Prague
	Report	Lafata 56'; Konaté 61'; Krejčí 81'

Štadión Pasienky, Bratislava
Attendance: 6,891
Referee: Martin Strömbergsson (Sweden)
23 October 2014
19:00

Young Boys (Switzerland)	2–0	(Italy) Napoli
Hoarau 52'; Bertone 90+2'	Report

Stade de Suisse, Bern
Attendance: 24,024
Referee: Ruddy Buquet (France)

6 November 2014
21:05

Sparta Prague (Czech Republic)	4–0	(Slovakia) Slovan Bratislava
Lafata 29', 83'; Krejčí 32'; Nhamoinesu 74'	Report

Generali Arena, Prague
Attendance: 13,875
Referee: Aleksei Eskov (Russia)
6 November 2014
21:05

Napoli (Italy)	3–0	(Switzerland) Young Boys
De Guzmán 45+2', 65', 83'	Report

Stadio San Paolo, Naples
Attendance: 12,283
Referee: Kenn Hansen (Denmark)

27 November 2014
19:00

Slovan Bratislava (Slovakia)	1–3	(Switzerland) Young Boys
Soumah 11'	Report	Hoarau 9' (pen.); Kubo 18', 63'

Štadión Pasienky, Bratislava
Attendance: 3,495
Referee: Pol van Boekel (Netherlands)
27 November 2014
19:00

Sparta Prague (Czech Republic)	0–0	(Italy) Napoli
	Report

Generali Arena, Prague
Attendance: 16,111
Referee: Andre Marriner (England)

11 December 2014
21:05

Young Boys (Switzerland)	2–0	(Czech Republic) Sparta Prague
Hoarau 75' (pen.); Steffen 90+4'	Report

Stade de Suisse, Bern
Attendance: 15,150
Referee: Hüseyin Göçek (Turkey)
11 December 2014
21:05

Napoli (Italy)	3–0	(Slovakia) Slovan Bratislava
Mertens 6'; Hamšík 16'; Zapata 75'	Report

Stadio San Paolo, Naples
Attendance: 6,490
Referee: Aleksandar Stavrev (Macedonia)

=== Group J ===
Pos	Team	Pld	W	D	L	GF	GA	GD	Pts	Qualification	DYK	AAB	STE	RIO
1	(Ukraine) Dynamo Kyiv	6	5	0	1	12	4	+8	15	Advance to knockout phase	—	2–0	3–1	2–0
2	(Denmark) AaB	6	3	0	3	5	10	−5	9	Advance to knockout phase	3–0	—	1–0	1–0
3	(Romania) Steaua București	6	2	1	3	11	9	+2	7		0–2	6–0	—	2–1
4	(Portugal) Rio Ave	6	1	1	4	5	10	−5	4		0–3	2–0	2–2	—

Source: Soccerway
Rules for classification: Group stage tiebreakers
18 September 2014
21:05

Steaua București (Romania)	6–0	(Denmark) AaB
Sânmărtean 51'; Rusescu 59' (pen.), 73'; Keșerü 61', 65', 72'	Report

Arena Națională, Bucharest (Note: Steaua București played their home matches at Arena Națională, Bucharest instead of their regular stadium, Stadionul Steaua, Bucharest.)
Attendance: 0 (Note: The Steaua București v AaB match was played behind closed doors due to punishment by UEFA.)
Referee: Vladislav Bezborodov (Russia)
18 September 2014
21:05

Rio Ave (Portugal)	0–3	(Ukraine) Dynamo Kyiv
	Report	Yarmolenko 20'; Belhanda 25'; Kravets 70'

Estádio dos Arcos, Vila do Conde
Attendance: 2,315
Referee: Stefan Johannesson (Sweden)

2 October 2014
19:00

Dynamo Kyiv (Ukraine)	3–1	(Romania) Steaua București
Yarmolenko 40'; Kravets 66'; Teodorczyk 90+1'	Report	Rusescu 89'

Olympic Stadium, Kyiv
Attendance: 28,280
Referee: Robert Schörgenhofer (Austria)
2 October 2014
19:00

AaB (Denmark)	1–0	(Portugal) Rio Ave
Helenius 46'	Report

Nordjyske Arena, Aalborg
Attendance: 4,741
Referee: Tony Chapron (France)

23 October 2014
19:00

AaB (Denmark)	3–0	(Ukraine) Dynamo Kyiv
Enevoldsen 11'; Thomsen 39', 90+1'	Report

Nordjyske Arena, Aalborg
Attendance: 6,043
Referee: Stephan Studer (Switzerland)
23 October 2014
19:00

Steaua București (Romania)	2–1	(Portugal) Rio Ave
Rusescu 17', 45'	Report	Del Valle 48'

Arena Națională, Bucharest
Attendance: 15,753
Referee: Simon Lee Evans (Wales)

6 November 2014
21:05

Dynamo Kyiv (Ukraine)	2–0	(Denmark) AaB
Vida 70'; Husyev 90+3'	Report

Olympic Stadium, Kyiv
Attendance: 25,230
Referee: Aleksei Kulbakov (Belarus)
6 November 2014
21:05

Rio Ave (Portugal)	2–2	(Romania) Steaua București
Diego Lopes 35', 77' (pen.)	Report	Keșerü 61'; Filip 90+4'

Estádio dos Arcos, Vila do Conde
Attendance: 3,232
Referee: Marcin Borski (Poland)

27 November 2014
19:00

AaB (Denmark)	1–0	(Romania) Steaua București
Enevoldsen 72'	Report

Nordjyske Arena, Aalborg
Attendance: 7,515
Referee: Felix Zwayer (Germany)
27 November 2014
19:00

Dynamo Kyiv (Ukraine)	2–0	(Portugal) Rio Ave
Lens 53'; Veloso 78'	Report

Olympic Stadium, Kyiv
Attendance: 14,500
Referee: Tom Harald Hagen (Norway)

11 December 2014
21:05

Steaua București (Romania)	0–2	(Ukraine) Dynamo Kyiv
	Report	Yarmolenko 71'; Lens 90+4'

Arena Națională, Bucharest
Attendance: 7,620
Referee: Michael Oliver (England)
11 December 2014
21:05

Rio Ave (Portugal)	2–0	(Denmark) AaB
Del Valle 59', 79'	Report

Estádio dos Arcos, Vila do Conde
Attendance: 2,672
Referee: Sébastien Delferiere (Belgium)

=== Group K ===
Pos	Team	Pld	W	D	L	GF	GA	GD	Pts	Qualification	FIO	GUI	PAO	DMI
1	(Italy) Fiorentina	6	4	1	1	11	4	+7	13	Advance to knockout phase	—	3–0	1–1	1–2
2	(France) Guingamp	6	3	1	2	7	6	+1	10	Advance to knockout phase	1–2	—	2–0	2–0
3	(Greece) PAOK	6	2	1	3	10	7	+3	7		0–1	1–2	—	6–1
4	(Belarus) Dinamo Minsk	6	1	1	4	3	14	−11	4		0–3	0–0	0–2	—

Source: Soccerway
Rules for classification: Group stage tiebreakers
18 September 2014
21:05

PAOK (Greece)	6–1	(Belarus) Dinamo Minsk
Nikolić 3' (o.g.); Athanasiadis 11', 16', 28'; Papadopoulos 50'; Tzandaris 90'	Report	Nikolić 80'

Toumba Stadium, Thessaloniki
Attendance: 13,416
Referee: Mattias Gestranius (Finland)
18 September 2014
21:05

Fiorentina (Italy)	3–0	(France) Guingamp
Vargas 34'; Cuadrado 67'; Bernardeschi 88'	Report

Stadio Artemio Franchi, Florence
Attendance: 15,712
Referee: Harald Lechner (Austria)

2 October 2014
19:00

Guingamp (France)	2–0	(Greece) PAOK
Marveaux 47', 50'	Report

Stade du Roudourou, Guingamp
Attendance: 8,783
Referee: Gediminas Mažeika (Lithuania)
2 October 2014
19:00

Dinamo Minsk (Belarus)	0–3	(Italy) Fiorentina
	Report	Aquilani 33'; Iličić 62'; Bernardeschi 67'

Borisov Arena, Barysaw (Note: Dinamo Minsk played their home matches at Borisov Arena, Barysaw instead of their regular stadium, Traktar Stadium, Minsk.)
Attendance: 5,097
Referee: Paweł Gil (Poland)

23 October 2014
19:00

Dinamo Minsk (Belarus)	0–0	(France) Guingamp
	Report

Borisov Arena, Barysaw
Attendance: 4,511
Referee: Aleksandar Stavrev (Macedonia)
23 October 2014
19:00

PAOK (Greece)	0–1	(Italy) Fiorentina
	Report	Vargas 38'

Toumba Stadium, Thessaloniki
Attendance: 22,612
Referee: Felix Zwayer (Germany)

6 November 2014
21:05

Guingamp (France)	2–0	(Belarus) Dinamo Minsk
Beauvue 44'; Mandanne 86'	Report

Stade du Roudourou, Guingamp
Attendance: 8,372
Referee: Artyom Kuchin (Kazakhstan)
6 November 2014
21:05

Fiorentina (Italy)	1–1	(Greece) PAOK
Pasqual 88'	Report	Martens 81'

Stadio Artemio Franchi, Florence
Attendance: 15,316
Referee: Sébastien Delferiere (Belgium)

27 November 2014
19:00

Dinamo Minsk (Belarus)	0–2	(Greece) PAOK
	Report	Athanasiadis 82', 88'

Borisov Arena, Barysaw
Attendance: 1,502
Referee: Robert Schörgenhofer (Austria)
27 November 2014
19:00

Guingamp (France)	1–2	(Italy) Fiorentina
Beauvue 45' (pen.)	Report	Marin 6'; Babacar 13'

Stade du Roudourou, Guingamp
Attendance: 5,519
Referee: Aleksei Eskov (Russia)

11 December 2014
21:05

PAOK (Greece)	1–2	(France) Guingamp
Athanasiadis 22' (pen.)	Report	Beauvue 7', 83'

Toumba Stadium, Thessaloniki
Attendance: 12,101
Referee: Kevin Blom (Netherlands)
11 December 2014
21:05

Fiorentina (Italy)	1–2	(Belarus) Dinamo Minsk
Marin 88'	Report	Kantsavy 39'; Nikolić 55'

Stadio Artemio Franchi, Florence
Attendance: 7,562
Referee: Cristian Balaj (Romania)

=== Group L ===
Pos	Team	Pld	W	D	L	GF	GA	GD	Pts	Qualification	LEG	TRA	LOK	MET
1	(Poland) Legia Warsaw	6	5	0	1	7	2	+5	15	Advance to knockout phase	—	2–0	1–0	2–1
2	(Turkey) Trabzonspor	6	3	1	2	8	6	+2	10	Advance to knockout phase	0–1	—	2–0	3–1
3	(Belgium) Lokeren	6	3	1	2	4	4	0	10		1–0	1–1	—	1–0
4	(Ukraine) Metalist Kharkiv	6	0	0	6	3	10	−7	0		0–1	1–2	0–1	—

Source: Soccerway
Rules for classification: Group stage tiebreakers
18 September 2014
21:05

Metalist Kharkiv (Ukraine)	1–2	(Turkey) Trabzonspor
Homenyuk 61'	Report	Constant 25'; Papadopoulos 90+4'

Arena Lviv, Lviv (Note: Metalist Kharkiv played their home matches at Arena Lviv, Lviv, or at Valeriy Lobanovskyi Dynamo Stadium, Kyiv, instead of their regular stadium, Metalist Stadium, Kharkiv, due to the pro-Russian unrest in Ukraine.)
Attendance: 6,854
Referee: Tom Harald Hagen (Norway)
18 September 2014
21:05

Legia Warsaw (Poland)	1–0	(Belgium) Lokeren
Radović 58'	Report

Polish Army Stadium, Warsaw
Attendance: 21,548
Referee: Michael Oliver (England)

2 October 2014
19:00

Lokeren (Belgium)	1–0	(Ukraine) Metalist Kharkiv
De Pauw 74'	Report

Daknamstadion, Lokeren
Attendance: 4,638
Referee: Stephan Studer (Switzerland)
2 October 2014
19:00

Trabzonspor (Turkey)	0–1	(Poland) Legia Warsaw
	Report	Kucharczyk 16'

Hüseyin Avni Aker Stadium, Trabzon
Attendance: 9,875
Referee: Viktor Kassai (Hungary)

22 October 2014
18:00

Metalist Kharkiv (Ukraine)	0–1	(Poland) Legia Warsaw
	Report	Duda 28'

Valeriy Lobanovskyi Dynamo Stadium, Kyiv
Attendance: 2,374
Referee: Gediminas Mažeika (Lithuania)
23 October 2014
19:00

Trabzonspor (Turkey)	2–0	(Belgium) Lokeren
Yatabaré 54'; Constant 87'	Report

Hüseyin Avni Aker Stadium, Trabzon
Attendance: 9,500
Referee: Liran Liany (Israel)

6 November 2014
21:05

Lokeren (Belgium)	1–1	(Turkey) Trabzonspor
Patosi 5'	Report	Waris 45+2'

Daknamstadion, Lokeren
Attendance: 6,879
Referee: Gianluca Rocchi (Italy)
6 November 2014
21:05

Legia Warsaw (Poland)	2–1	(Ukraine) Metalist Kharkiv
Saganowski 29'; Duda 84'	Report	Kobin 22'

Polish Army Stadium, Warsaw
Attendance: 25,809
Referee: Eitan Shemeulevitch (Israel)

27 November 2014
19:00

Trabzonspor (Turkey)	3–1	(Ukraine) Metalist Kharkiv
Belkalem 36'; Ekici 86'; Horyainov 90+5' (o.g.)	Report	Homenyuk 68'

Hüseyin Avni Aker Stadium, Trabzon
Attendance: 6,250
Referee: Mattias Gestranius (Finland)
27 November 2014
19:00

Lokeren (Belgium)	1–0	(Poland) Legia Warsaw
Vanaken 7'	Report

Daknamstadion, Lokeren
Attendance: 6,526
Referee: Michael Koukoulakis (Greece)

11 December 2014
21:05

Metalist Kharkiv (Ukraine)	0–1	(Belgium) Lokeren
	Report	Leye 16'

Arena Lviv, Lviv
Attendance: 1,386
Referee: Leontios Trattou (Cyprus)
11 December 2014
21:05

Legia Warsaw (Poland)	2–0	(Turkey) Trabzonspor
Öztürk 22' (o.g.); Sá 56'	Report

Polish Army Stadium, Warsaw
Attendance: 20,000
Referee: Kenn Hansen (Denmark)
