= Aleksandr Ageyev =

Russian football player

Personal information
- Full name: Aleksandr Borisovich Ageyev
- Date of birth: 22 May 1996 (age 30)
- Place of birth: Belgorod, Russia
- Height: 1.65 m (5 ft 5 in)
- Position: Attacking midfielder

Youth career
- 2012–2017: Krasnodar

Senior career*
Years	Team	Apps	(Gls)
2014–2017	Krasnodar-2	24	(3)
2014–2017	Krasnodar	0	(0)
2015–2017	→ Energomash (loan)	40	(2)
2018–2022	Salyut Belgorod	67	(10)
2020	→ Avangard Kursk (loan)	2	(1)
2020–2021	→ Tekstilshchik (loan)	29	(1)
2022–2025	Avangard Kursk	86	(5)
2025	Murom	8	(0)
- * Club domestic league appearances and goals as of 19 October 2025

Aleksandr Borisovich Ageyev (Russian: Александр Борисович Агеев; born 22 May 1996) is a Russian football player.

== Club career ==
He made his professional debut in the Russian Professional Football League for Krasnodar-2 on 10 April 2014 in a game against Mashuk-KMV.

He made his debut for the main squad of Krasnodar in the 2014–15 UEFA Europa League against Diósgyőr on 7 August 2014. He also appeared in that season's Europa League group stage 1–0 away victory over Everton. He scored his first goal for the main squad on 25 September 2014 in a Russian Cup game against Sokol Saratov.
