= Wánderson (footballer, born 1986) =

Brazilian footballer

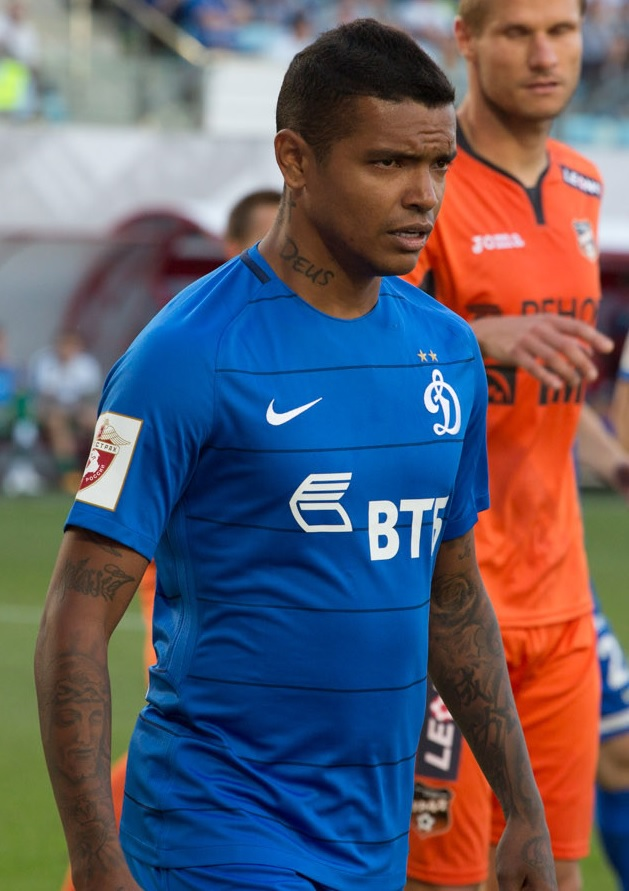
- Wánderson with Dynamo Moscow in 2017

Personal information
- Full name: Francisco Wánderson do Carmo Carneiro
- Date of birth: 18 February 1986 (age 40)
- Place of birth: Baturité, Brazil
- Height: 1.80 m (5 ft 11 in)
- Position: Midfielder

Youth career
- ES Tiradentes
- Ceará

Senior career*
Years	Team	Apps	(Gls)
2006	Fortaleza	7	(0)
2006	→ Ríver Atlético Clube (loan)		
2007–2010	GAIS	83	(32)
2010–2011	Al-Ahli	16	(3)
2011	→ GAIS (loan)	18	(5)
2011–2012	GAIS	27	(7)
2012	→ Krasnodar (loan)	11	(7)
2013–2017	Krasnodar	91	(27)
2017	Dynamo Moscow	13	(1)
2018	Alanyaspor	5	(0)
2018–2019	Helsingborgs IF	28	(0)
2021	Atlético Cearense	8	(0)
Total		307	(82)
- * Club domestic league appearances and goals

Francisco Wánderson do Carmo Carneiro (born 18 February 1986), commonly known as Wánderson (Brazilian Portuguese: [ˈwɐ̃ndɐʁsõ]), is Brazilian former professional footballer who played as an attacking midfielder or second striker.

== Club career ==
Wánderson previously played for Swedish club GAIS. He signed a four-and-a-half-year deal in July 2007 with GAIS, coming from Fortaleza. In Allsvenskan 2009 he scored 18 goals, making him top scorer in the league alongside IFK Göteborg player Tobias Hysén.

On 27 July 2010, Wánderson signed a three-year contract with Saudi Arabian team Al-Ahli.

On 31 March 2011, it was announced that Wánderson would spend the next 6 months on loan at his former club GAIS.

=== Krasnodar ===
On 6 September 2012, Wanderson moved to FC Krasnodar on a six-month loan deal from GAIS, with an option to make the move permanent. At the end of the 2012–13 Wanderson was joint top goalscorer with Yura Movsisyan on 13 goals. On 13 December 2012, Krasnodar signed Wanderson on a permanent basis, with the striker agreeing a two-year deal, with the option of a third. At the end of the 2013–14 season Wanderson was named in the end of season "Best 33" list by the Russian Football Union.

He left Krasnodar upon the expiration of his contract at the end of the 2016–17 season.

=== Dynamo Moscow ===
On 14 June 2017, Wánderson signed with Dynamo Moscow.

=== Alanyaspor ===
On 31 January 2018, he moved to the Turkish club Alanyaspor.

=== Helsingborgs IF ===
On 7 August 2018, Wánderson returned to Sweden signing with Helsingborgs IF in Superettan, the second tier. He signed a contract running until 2021, rejoining Andreas Granqvist, his former teammate at Krasnodar. He retired in January 2020.

=== Atlético Cearense ===
He returned to playing in early 2021 with Atlético Cearense, and retired again in June.

== International career ==
Wánderson indicated that he would be likely to accept a call-up for Russia national team if asked.

== Career statistics ==
Appearances and goals by club, season and competition
Club	Season	League			National cup		Continental		Other		Total	
Club	Season	Division	Apps	Goals	Apps	Goals	Apps	Goals	Apps	Goals	Apps	Goals
GAIS	2007	Allsvenskan	9	1	0	0	–		–		9	1
GAIS	2008	Allsvenskan	29	9	1	0	–		–		30	9
GAIS	2009	Allsvenskan	30	18	1	0	–		–		31	18
GAIS	2010	Allsvenskan	15	4	2	1	–		–		17	5
GAIS	Total		83	32	4	1	0	0	0	0	87	33
Al-Ahli	2010–11	Saudi Professional League	16	3	1	0	–		–		17	3
GAIS (loan)	2011	Allsvenskan	18	5	0	0	–		–		18	5
GAIS	2011	Allsvenskan	8	5	0	0	–		–		8	5
GAIS	2012	Allsvenskan	19	2	1	0	–		–		20	2
GAIS	Total		27	7	1	0	0	0	0	0	28	7
Krasnodar (loan)	2012–13	Russian Premier League	11	7	2	0	–		–		13	7
Krasnodar	2012–13	Russian Premier League	11	6	0	0	–		–		11	6
Krasnodar	2013–14	Russian Premier League	29	9	4	3	–		–		33	12
Krasnodar	2014–15	Russian Premier League	15	4	1	1	11	5	–		27	10
Krasnodar	2015–16	Russian Premier League	22	5	4	0	8	3	–		34	9
Krasnodar	2016–17	Russian Premier League	14	3	1	0	6	0	–		21	3
Krasnodar	Total		91	27	10	4	25	8	0	0	126	39
Dynamo Moscow	2017–18	Russian Premier League	13	1	1	0	–		–		14	1
Alanyaspor	2017–18	Süper Lig	5	0	0	0	–		–		5	0
Helsingborgs IF	2018	Superettan	8	0	1	0	–		–		9	0
Helsingborgs IF	2019	Allsvenskan	20	0	0	0	–		–		20	0
Helsingborgs IF	Total		28	0	1	0	0	0	0	0	29	0
Career total			292	82	20	5	25	8	0	0	337	95

== Honours ==
Individual

- Allsvenskan top scorer: 2009 (shared with Tobias Hysén)
- Russian Premier League top scorer: 2012–13 with 13 goals
- List of 33 top players of the Russian league: 2013–14
