= Aleksandr Butenko =

Russian football player

Personal information
- Full name: Aleksandr Sergeyevich Butenko
- Date of birth: 20 July 1998 (age 28)
- Place of birth: Astrakhan, Russia
- Height: 1.70 m (5 ft 7 in)
- Positions: Midfielder; forward

Team information
- Current team: FC Mashuk-KMV Pyatigorsk
- Number: 13

Youth career
- –2015: FC Volgar Astrakhan
- 2015–2019: FC Krasnodar

Senior career*
Years	Team	Apps	(Gls)
2016–2020	FC Krasnodar-2	45	(10)
2018	→ FC Milsami Orhei (loan)	14	(5)
2019	→ FC Krasnodar-3	11	(5)
2019–2020	→ FC Volgar Astrakhan (loan)	17	(6)
2020–2023	FC Volgar Astrakhan	59	(2)
2023–	FC Mashuk-KMV Pyatigorsk	115	(17)
- * Club domestic league appearances and goals as of 15 November 2026

Aleksandr Sergeyevich Butenko (Russian: Александр Сергеевич Бутенко; born 20 July 1998) is a Russian football player who plays for FC Mashuk-KMV Pyatigorsk.

== Club career ==
He made his debut in the Russian Professional Football League for FC Krasnodar-2 on 4 August 2016 in a game against FC Armavir.

On 13 June 2019, he joined FC Volgar Astrakhan on loan. He rejoined Volgar on a permanent basis on 11 June 2020.
