= Ruslan Rzayev =

Russian footballer (born 1998)

Personal information
- Full name: Ruslan Aliguliyevich Rzayev
- Date of birth: 24 January 1998 (age 28)
- Place of birth: Bataysk, Russia
- Height: 1.71 m (5 ft 7 in)
- Positions: Midfielder; forward

Senior career*
| Years | Team | Apps | (Gls) |
| 2015–2021 | FC Krasnodar | 0 | (0) |
| 2016–2019 | → FC Krasnodar-2 | 52 | (3) |
| 2018–2019 | → FC Krasnodar-3 | 22 | (3) |
| 2019–2020 | → FC Armavir (loan) | 22 | (1) |
| 2020–2021 | → FC Krasnodar-2 | 9 | (0) |
| 2020–2021 | → FC Krasnodar-3 | 8 | (3) |
| 2021–2022 | FC Kuban-Holding Pavlovskaya | 21 | (5) |
| 2022–2024 | FC SKA Rostov-on-Don | 47 | (8) |
| 2024 | FC Sevastopol | 30 | (1) |
- * Club domestic league appearances and goals as of 16 November 2024

Ruslan Rzayev (Azerbaijani: Ruslan Əliqulu oğlu Rzayev, Russian: Руслан Алигулиевич Рзаев; born 24 January 1998) is a Russian football player.

== Club career ==
He made his debut in the Russian Professional Football League for FC Krasnodar-2 on 29 July 2016 in a game against FC Sochi. He made his Russian Football National League debut for Krasnodar-2 on 4 August 2018 in a game against FC Tyumen.

On 11 June 2019, he joined FC Armavir on loan.
