= Aleksandr Sergeyev (footballer, born 1998) =

Russian footballer

Personal information
- Full name: Aleksandr Sergeyevich Sergeyev
- Date of birth: 29 May 1998 (age 28)
- Place of birth: Ulyanovsk, Russia
- Height: 1.69 m (5 ft 7 in)
- Position: Midfielder

Youth career
- –2018: FC Krasnodar

Senior career*
Years	Team	Apps	(Gls)
2016–2018	FC Krasnodar-2	29	(2)
2018–2019	FC Volga Ulyanovsk	16	(0)
2019	FC Nizhny Novgorod	15	(0)
2020	FC Akron Tolyatti	0	(0)
2021	FC Mashuk-KMV Pyatigorsk	15	(1)
2022	FC Luki-Energiya Velikiye Luki	9	(3)
2022–2023	FC Ryazan	19	(0)
- * Club domestic league appearances and goals as of 9 November 2022

Aleksandr Sergeyevich Sergeyev (Russian: Александр Сергеевич Сергеев; born 29 May 1998) is a Russian football player.

== Club career ==
He made his debut in the Russian Professional Football League for FC Krasnodar-2 on 29 July 2016 in a game against FC Sochi.

He made his Russian Football National League debut for FC Nizhny Novgorod on 7 July 2019 in a game against FC Tom Tomsk.
