= 2019–20 FC Krasnodar season =

FC Krasnodar
2019–20 season
- Chairman: Sergey Galitsky
- Manager: Murad Musayev
- Stadium: Krasnodar Stadium
- Premier League: 3rd
- Russian Cup: Round of 32
- Champions League: Play-off round
- Europa League: Group stage
- Top goalscorer: League: Marcus Berg (9); All: Marcus Berg (10)
Home colours	Away colours

The 2019–20 FC Krasnodar season was the ninth successive season that Krasnodar played in the Russian Premier League, the highest tier of association football in Russia. They finished the previous season in 3rd place, qualifying for the UEFA Champions League for the first time, entering at the third-qualifying round. They also took part in the Russian Cup.

== Season events ==
On 20 May 2019, Krasnodar announced that Kaio had signed on a five-year contract from Santa Clara. Two days later, 22 May, Krasnodar announced their second signing of the summer, with Younes Namli signing a four-year contract from PEC Zwolle.

On 10 June, Krasnodar announced the signing of Ruslan Kambolov on a two-year contract from Rubin Kazan.

On 19 June, Andrei Tekuchyov joined Chayka Peschanokopskoye on loan for the season.

On 20 June, Krasnodar announced the signing of Tonny Vilhena on a long-term contract from Feyenoord. The next day, 21 June, Roman Kurazhov joined KAMAZ on a season-long loan and Oleg Lanin joined Yenisey Krasnoyarsk on a season-long loan.

On 27 June, Daniil Fomin moved to FC Ufa on a permanent deal.

On 11 July, Roman Shishkin left Krasnodar by mutual consent.

On 13 July, Krasnodar announced the signing of Marcus Berg on a one-year contract.

On 25 July, Krasnodar announced the signing of Rémy Cabella from AS Saint-Étienne.

On 31 July, Artyom Golubev joined Ufa on loan until 31 May 2021.

On 27 August, Andrei Ivan left Krasnodar to rejoin Universitatea Craiova.

On 2 September, Krasnodar announced the signing of Manuel Fernandes on a free transfer following his release from Lokomotiv Moscow at the end of the previous season, and Aleksei Gritsayenko joined Tambov on loan until the end of the season. Yegor Sorokin also signed for Krasnodar on 2 September from Rubin Kazan to a five-year contract, whilst remaining at Rubin on loan for the remainder of the 2019/20 season.

On 20 September, Krasnodar announced that they had terminated the contract of Pavel Mamayev.

On 11 December, Aleksei Tatayev moved permanently to Mladá Boleslav.

On 28 December, Krasnodar announced that Ivan Ignatyev had been sold to Rubin Kazan, with the move becoming official on 2 January 2020.

On 30 December, Yegor Sorokin was recalled from his loan at Rubin Kazan.

On 7 January, Dmitri Skopintsev moved to Dynamo Moscow.

On 15 January, Younes Namli joined Colorado Rapids on loan until the end of December 2021.

On 17 March, the Russian Premier League postponed all league fixtures until April 10 due to the COVID-19 pandemic.

On 1 April, the Russian Football Union extended the suspension of football until 31 May.

On 15 May, the Russian Football Union announced that the Russian Premier League season would resume on 21 June.

On 16 June, Krasnodar announced that Murad Musayev had passed the appropriate coaching courses to be confirmed as their head coach.

On 17 June, FC Rostov announced that six of their players had tested positive for COVID-19, putting their upcoming fixture against Krasnodar in jeopardy.

On 21 June, the Krasnodar vs Dynamo Moscow match scheduled for the same day was postponed until 19 July due to an outbreak of COVID-19 in the Dynamo Moscow squad.

On 26 June, it was announced that Krasnodar's fixture against Orenburg scheduled for 27 June would not take place due to an outbreak of COVID-19 in the Orenburg squad, and was subsequently awarded to Krasnodar as a 3-0 technical victory.

== Squad ==
As of match played 22 July 2020

Number	Name	Nationality	Position	Date of birth (age)	Signed from	Signed in	Contract ends	Apps.	Goals
Goalkeepers
1	Stanislav Kritsyuk	(Russia)	GK	1 December 1990 (aged 29)	Braga	2016	2020	72	0
39	Matvei Safonov	(Russia)	GK	25 February 1999 (aged 21)	Academy	2016		56	0
66	Denis Adamov	(Russia)	GK	20 February 1998 (aged 22)	Academy	2014		2	0
88	Andrei Sinitsyn	(Russia)	GK	23 June 1988 (aged 32)	Yenisey Krasnoyarsk	2012		103	0
Defenders
2	Yegor Sorokin	(Russia)	DF	4 November 1995 (aged 24)	Rubin Kazan	2019	2024	8	0
3	Jón Fjóluson	(Iceland)	DF	10 April 1989 (aged 31)	IFK Norrköping	2018	2021	28	0
4	Alyaksandr Martynovich	(Belarus)	DF	26 August 1987 (aged 32)	Dinamo Minsk	2010		228	5
5	Uroš Spajić	(Serbia)	DF	13 February 1993 (aged 27)	Anderlecht	2018	2023	65	1
6	Cristian Ramírez	(Ecuador)	DF	12 August 1994 (aged 25)	Ferencvárosi	2017		111	0
15	Nikolay Markov	(Russia)	DF	20 April 1985 (aged 34)	Kuban Krasnodar	2018		97	3
46	Vitali Stezhko	(Russia)	DF	29 January 1997 (aged 23)	Academy	2014		0	0
98	Sergei Petrov	(Russia)	DF	2 January 1991 (aged 29)	Krylia Sovetov	2013		218	12
Midfielders
7	Rémy Cabella	(France)	MF	8 March 1990 (aged 30)	AS Saint-Étienne	2019		12	2
8	Yury Gazinsky	(Russia)	MF	20 July 1989 (aged 31)	Torpedo Moscow	2013		230	10
10	Wanderson	(Brazil)	MF	7 October 1994 (aged 25)	Red Bull Salzburg	2017		101	13
14	Kristoffer Olsson	(Sweden)	MF	30 June 1995 (aged 25)	AIK	2019		45	1
16	Viktor Claesson	(Sweden)	MF	2 January 1992 (aged 28)	IF Elfsborg	2017	2021	94	32
31	Kaio	(Brazil)	MF	18 September 1995 (aged 24)	Santa Clara	2019	2024	12	0
47	Daniil Utkin	(Russia)	MF	12 October 1999 (aged 20)	Academy	2018		38	6
52	Tonny Vilhena	(Netherlands)	MF	3 January 1995 (aged 25)	Feyenoord	2019		30	4
53	Alexander Chernikov	(Russia)	MF	1 February 2000 (aged 20)	Academy	2019		7	0
62	Aleks Matsukatov	(Russia)	MF	1 November 1999 (aged 20)	Academy	2019		2	0
70	Ilya Zhigulyov	(Russia)	MF	1 February 1996 (aged 24)	Academy	2012		23	0
77	Ruslan Kambolov	(Russia)	MF	1 January 1990 (aged 30)	Rubin Kazan	2019	2021	24	0
89	Dmitry Stotsky	(Russia)	MF	1 December 1989 (aged 30)	Ufa	2018	2022	54	1
99	Manuel Fernandes	(Portugal)	MF	5 February 1986 (aged 34)	Lokomotiv Moscow	2019	2020	19	3
Forwards
9	Ari	(Russia)	FW	11 December 1985 (aged 34)	Spartak Moscow	2013		159	52
33	Marcus Berg	(Sweden)	FW	17 August 1986 (aged 33)	Al Ain	2019	2020	32	10
37	Ilya Vorotnikov	(Russia)	FW	11 February 2001 (aged 19)	Academy	2017		1	0
60	German Onugkha	(Russia)	FW	6 July 1996 (aged 24)	Volgar Astrakhan	2018	2022	3	0
63	Nikita Sergeyev	(Russia)	FW	17 October 1999 (aged 20)	Academy	2016		4	0
67	Maksim Kutovoy	(Russia)	FW	1 July 2001 (aged 19)	Academy	2019		3	0
93	Magomed-Shapi Suleymanov	(Russia)	FW	16 December 1999 (aged 20)	Academy	2015		76	18
Away on loan
13	Aleksei Gritsayenko	(Russia)	DF	25 May 1995 (aged 25)	Luch Vladivostok	2017		11	1
21	Younes Namli	(Denmark)	MF	20 June 1994 (aged 26)	PEC Zwolle	2019	2023	18	1
50	Artyom Golubev	(Russia)	DF	21 January 1999 (aged 21)	Academy	2018		5	0
64	Oleg Lanin	(Russia)	MF	22 January 1996 (aged 24)	Academy	2012		1	0
91	Leo Goglichidze	(Russia)	DF	29 April 1997 (aged 23)	Academy	2013		1	0
	Andrei Tekuchyov	(Russia)	MF	5 July 1999 (aged 21)	Academy	2016		0	0
	Roman Kurazhov	(Russia)	MF	28 July 1999 (aged 20)	Academy	2016		0	0
	Ruslan Rzayev	(Russia)	FW	24 January 1998 (aged 22)	Academy	2015		0	0
Players who left during the season
11	Dmitri Skopintsev	(Russia)	MF	2 March 1997 (aged 23)	Rostov	2019		17	2
17	Ivan Ignatyev	(Russia)	FW	6 January 1999 (aged 21)	Academy	2015		54	17
19	Andrei Ivan	(Romania)	FW	4 January 1997 (aged 23)	Universitatea Craiova	2017		9	0
20	Christian Cueva	(Peru)	MF	23 November 1991 (aged 28)	São Paulo	2018	2022	23	1
	Pavel Mamayev	(Russia)	MF	17 September 1988 (aged 31)	CSKA Moscow	2013	2019	122	30
	Aleksei Tatayev	(Russia)	MF	8 October 1998 (aged 21)	Academy	2015		0	0

=== Out on loan ===
Note: Flags indicate national team as defined under FIFA eligibility rules; some limited exceptions apply. Players may hold more than one non-FIFA nationality.

No.	Pos.	Nation	Player
—	DF	RUS	Artyom Golubev (at Ufa until 31 May 2021)
—	DF	RUS	Aleksei Gritsayenko (at Tambov until 30 June 2020)
—	DF	RUS	Yegor Sorokin (at Rubin Kazan until 30 June 2020)
—	MF	DEN	Younes Namli (at Colorado Rapids until 31 December 2021)

No.	Pos.	Nation	Player
—	MF	RUS	Andrei Tekuchyov (at Chayka Peschanokopskoye until 30 June 2020)
—	MF	RUS	Roman Kurazhov (at KAMAZ until 30 June 2020)
—	MF	RUS	Oleg Lanin (at Yenisey Krasnoyarsk until 30 June 2020)
—	FW	RUS	Ruslan Rzayev (at Armavir until 30 June 2020)

== Transfers ==
=== In ===
Date	Position	Nationality	Name	From	Fee	Ref.
20 May 2019†	MF	(Brazil)	Kaio	Santa Clara	Undisclosed	
22 May 2019	MF	(Denmark)	Younes Namli	PEC Zwolle	Undisclosed	
10 June 2019	MF	(Russia)	Ruslan Kambolov	Rubin Kazan	Undisclosed	
20 June 2019	MF	(Netherlands)	Tonny Vilhena	Feyenoord	Undisclosed	
13 July 2019	FW	(Sweden)	Marcus Berg	Al Ain	Free	
26 July 2019	MF	(France)	Rémy Cabella	AS Saint-Étienne	Undisclosed	
2 September 2019	MF	(Portugal)	Manuel Fernandes	Lokomotiv Moscow	Free	
2 September 2019	DF	(Russia)	Yegor Sorokin	Rubin Kazan	Undisclosed	

† Transfers announced on the above date, becoming official when the Russian transfer window opened.

=== Out ===
Date	Position	Nationality	Name	To	Fee	Ref.
27 June 2019	MF	(Russia)	Daniil Fomin	Ufa	Undisclosed	
27 August 2019	FW	(Romania)	Andrei Ivan	Universitatea Craiova	Undisclosed	
11 December 2019	MF	(Russia)	Aleksei Tatayev	Mladá Boleslav	Undisclosed	
30 December 2019	MF	(Russia)	Oleg Lanin	Yenisey Krasnoyarsk	Undisclosed	
2 January 2020	FW	(Russia)	Ivan Ignatyev	Rubin Kazan	Undisclosed	
7 January 2020	MF	(Russia)	Dmitri Skopintsev	Dynamo Moscow	Undisclosed	
31 January 2020	MF	(Peru)	Christian Cueva	Santos	Undisclosed	
8 June 2020	DF	(Russia)	Leo Goglichidze	Chayka Peschanokopskoye	Undisclosed	

=== Loans out ===
Date from	Position	Nationality	Name	To	Date to	Ref.
	MF	(Russia)	Aleksei Tatayev	Mladá Boleslav	11 December 2019	
8 February 2019	MF	(Peru)	Christian Cueva	Santos	31 January 2020	
11 June 2019	FW	(Russia)	Ruslan Rzayev	Armavir	End of Season	
19 June 2019	MF	(Russia)	Andrei Tekuchyov	Chayka Peschanokopskoye	End of Season	
21 June 2019	MF	(Russia)	Roman Kurazhov	KAMAZ	End of Season	
21 June 2019	MF	(Russia)	Oleg Lanin	Yenisey Krasnoyarsk	30 December 2019	
28 June 2019	DF	(Russia)	Igor Paradin	Teplice	End of Season	
31 July 2019	DF	(Russia)	Artyom Golubev	Ufa	31 May 2021	
2 September 2019	DF	(Russia)	Aleksei Gritsayenko	Tambov	End of Season	
2 September 2019	DF	(Russia)	Yegor Sorokin	Rubin Kazan	30 December 2019	
3 January 2020	FW	(Russia)	Arutyun Grigoryan	Mladá Boleslav	End of Season	
15 January 2020	MF	(Denmark)	Younes Namli	Colorado Rapids	December 2021	

=== Released ===
Date	Position	Nationality	Name	Joined	Date
Summer 2019	DF	(Norway)	Stefan Strandberg	Trapani	13 December 2019
11 July 2019	DF	(Russia)	Roman Shishkin	Torpedo Moscow	12 August 2019
20 September 2019	MF	(Russia)	Pavel Mamayev	Rostov	28 September 2019
23 December 2019	DF	(Russia)	Ivan Taranov		
30 June 2020	DF	(Russia)	Leo Goglichidze	Chayka Peschanokopskoye	1 July 2020
30 June 2020	DF	(Russia)	Nikolay Markov	Yenisey Krasnoyarsk	28 July 2020
30 June 2020	FW	(Russia)	Aleksandr Butenko	Volgar Astrakhan	1 July 2020
20 July 2020	GK	(Russia)	Stanislav Kritsyuk	Belenenses SAD	29 September 2020
23 July 2020	DF	(Iceland)	Jón Guðni Fjóluson	Brann	22 September 2020
23 July 2020	MF	(Portugal)	Manuel Fernandes	Kayserispor	5 October 2020

== Friendlies ==
20 June 2019	Krasnodar	2 – 2	Chayka Peschanokopskoye	Krasnodar
18:00 MSK (UTC+3)	Wanderson 33'; Ignatyev 63'	Report	Khokhlachyov 44'; Kiselev (yellow card) 62'; Chaly 85'	Stadium: Krasnodar Academy Stadium; Attendance: 2,300; Referee: Yermakov

27 June 2019 Match TV Cup	CSKA Moscow	0 – 1	Krasnodar	Pöllau, Austria
MSK (UTC+3)	Martynovich 45'	Report	T.Avanesyan (yellow card) 76'	Stadium: Sparkasse Pöllau AG stadium Attendance: 500; Referee: Weinberger

30 June 2019 Match TV Cup	Rostov	0 – 3	Krasnodar	Pöllau, Austria
11:30 MSK (UTC+3)		Report	Martynovich (yellow card) 23'; Ari 38' (pen.); Utkin 61'; Khalnazarov 84'	Stadium: Sparkasse Pöllau AG stadium Attendance: 500; Referee: Ciochirca

4 July 2019 Match TV Cup	Spartak Moscow	1 – 2	Krasnodar	Pöllau, Austria
19:00 MSK (UTC+3)	Fernando (yellow card) 41'; Dzhikiya (yellow card) 50'; Zobnin (yellow card) 51'; Bakayev 63'	Report	Kambolov 38'; Spajić (yellow card) 51'; Ari 63'; Golubev (yellow card) 78'	Stadium: Sparkasse Pöllau AG stadium Attendance: 800; Referee: Jäger

5 July 2019	Krasnodar	0 – 2	Ural Yekaterinburg	Lebring-Sankt Margarethen, Austria
18:30 MSK (UTC+3)		Report	Augustyniak 2'; Panyukov 39'	Stadium: SV Gadi Raika Lebring; Attendance: 200; Referee: Altun

7 July 2019	Krasnodar	1 – 2	Krylia Sovetov	Zehau, Austria
18:00 MSK (UTC+3)	Namli 46'	Report	Kabutov 38'; Golenkov 75'	Stadium: Kreuterdorfstadion Zehau; Attendance: 400; Referee: Insupp

22 January 2020	Krasnodar (Russia)	2 – 1	(Romania) Dinamo București	Marbella, Spain
18:00 MSK (UTC+3)	Fernandes (yellow card) 34'; Sergeyev 57'; Ari 63'	Report	N'Diaye (yellow card) 34'; Mrzljak 37'	Stadium: Dama de Noche; Referee: F. Barba

26 January 2020	Krasnodar (Russia)	2 – 1	(Czech Republic) Jablonec	Marbella, Spain
15:00 MSK (UTC+3)	Fernandes 29'; Berg 57' (pen.)	Report	Krob 32'	Stadium: Football Centre; Attendance: 50; Referee: Dm Jose Daniel

2 February 2020	Krasnodar (Russia)	3 – 1	(Sweden) Malmö	Marbella, Spain
18:00 MSK (UTC+3)	Vorotnikov 68'; Utkin 72'; Matsukatov (yellow card) 93'; Borodin 102'	Report	Rakip 116'	Stadium: Estadio Municipal de Marbella; Referee: F. Barba
Note: Match was 120 minutes long.

7 February 2020	Krasnodar (Russia)	3 – 4	(Czech Republic) Viktoria Plzeň	Marbella, Spain
14:00 MSK (UTC+3)	Berg 39'; Suleymanov 66'; Fernandes 82'	Report	Kovařík 11'; Čermák 24'; Mihálik 73'; Chorý 76'	Stadium: Estadio Municipal de Marbella; Attendance: 100; Referee: G. Masuela

7 February 2020	Krasnodar (Russia)	4 – 3	(Norway) Mjøndalen IF	Marbella, Spain
18:30 MSK (UTC+3)	Ari 6', 52'; Sergeyev 31', 41'; Stezhko (yellow card) 64'; Trialist (yellow card) 83'; Bochko (yellow card) 90+2'	Report	Brustad 42', 90+1'; Aasmundsen (yellow card) 66'; Thórhallsson 73' (pen.)	Stadium: Football Centre; Attendance: 50; Referee: C. Hagenes

16 February 2020	Krasnodar	1 – 0	Krylia Sovetov	Marbella, Spain
13:00 MSK (UTC+3)	Borodin (yellow card) 55'; Vorotnikov 57'	Report		Stadium: Dama de Noche

16 February 2020	Krasnodar (Russia)	0 – 1	(Norway) Molde	Marbella, Spain
16:00 MSK (UTC+3)	Gazinsky (yellow card) 24'; Vilhena (yellow card) 89'	Report	Knudtzon 48'; Aursnes (yellow card) 70'; Christensen (yellow card) 75'	Stadium: Estadio Municipal de Marbella; Attendance: 100

20 February 2020	Krasnodar (Russia)	0 – 1	(Spain) Málaga	Marbella, Spain
13:00 MSK (UTC+3)	Fernandes (penalty missed) 30'	Report	Benkhemassa 16'	Stadium: Ciudad De Malaga

23 February 2020	Krasnodar	0 – 1	Rostov	Marbella, Spain
MSK (UTC+3)		Report

== Competitions ==
=== Premier League ===
==== Results by round ====
Round	1	2	3	4	5	6	7	8	9	10	11	12	13	14	15	16	17	18	19	20	21	22	23	24	25	26	27	28	29	30
Ground	A	A	H	A	H	A	H	A	H	A	H	H	A	H	H	A	A	H	H	H	A	A	A	A	H	A	H	A	H	H
Result	L	W	W	D	W	W	D	W	W	L	W	W	D	D	D	D	W	D	D	W	W	L	W	D	L	L	W	D	L	W
Position	14	9	4	5	4	3	1	1	1	4	4	3	3	4	4	5	4	3	2	2	2	3	3	3	3	4	3	3	3	3

Updated to match(es) played on 22 July 2020. Source: See Results
A = Away; H = Home; W = Win; D = Draw; L = Loss

==== Results ====
14 July 2019 1	Akhmat Grozny	1 – 0	Krasnodar	Grozny
21:30 MSK (UTC+3)	Berisha (penalty missed) 10' 28'; Nižić (yellow card) 33'; Kharin (yellow card) 36'; Ismael (yellow card) 82'; Gorodov (yellow card) 90+4'	Report	Petrov (yellow card) 9'; Kambolov (yellow card) 71'; Vilhena (yellow card) 90+1'	Stadium: Akhmat-Arena; Attendance: 27,535; Referee: Vitali Meshkov

20 July 2019 2	Ufa	2 – 3	Krasnodar	Ufa
14:00 MSK (UTC+3)	Carp 28'; Tabidze 40'; Igboun (yellow card) 64'; Krotov (yellow card) 87'	Report	Spajić (yellow card) 28'; Namli 49'; Ramírez (yellow card) 54'; Vilhena 73'; Tabidze 87'	Stadium: Neftyanik Stadium; Attendance: 6,725; Referee: Aleksei Yeskov

27 July 2019 3	Krasnodar	3 – 0	Sochi	Krasnodar
19:00 MSK (UTC+3)	Ignatyev 14', 42'; Ari (yellow card) 32'; Suleymanov 80'; Kambolov (yellow card) 86'	Report	Nabiullin (yellow card) 25' (yellow-red card) 77'; Tsallagov (yellow card) 53'	Stadium: Krasnodar Stadium; Attendance: 32,177; Referee: Sergey Lapochkin

3 August 2019 4	Zenit St.Petersburg	1 – 1	Krasnodar	Saint Petersburg
21:30 MSK (UTC+3)	Zhirkov (yellow card) 2'; Barrios (yellow card) 28'; Dzyuba 90+1'	Report	Vilhena (yellow card) 36'; Cabella (yellow card) 54'; Ramírez (yellow card) 61'; Ari (yellow card) 89'	Stadium: Krestovsky Stadium; Attendance: 54,078; Referee: Aleksei Eskov

10 August 2019 5	Krasnodar	1 – 0	Rubin Kazan	Krasnodar
19:00 MSK (UTC+3)	Cabella (yellow card) 13'; Ignatyev 17'; Namli (yellow card) 18' (yellow-red card) 45+2'; Suleymanov (yellow card) 80'	Report	Davitashvili (yellow card) 24'; Uremović (yellow card) 66'; Konovalov (yellow card) 90+1'	Stadium: Krasnodar Stadium; Attendance: 25,826; Referee: Sergey Lapochkin

18 August 2019 6	Tambov	0 – 2	Krasnodar	Saransk
16:30 MSK (UTC+3)	Karasyov (yellow card) 15'; Tetrashvili (yellow card) 77'; Benito (yellow card) 81'; Khosonov (yellow card) 82'	Report	Wanderson 2'; Ramírez (yellow card) 11'; Utkin 78'	Stadium: Mordovia Arena; Attendance: 7,115; Referee: Nikolay Voloshin
Note: Match played at the Mordovia Arena, Saransk instead of Tambov's regular Spartak Stadium in Tambov.

24 August 2019 7	Krasnodar	1 – 1	Lokomotiv Moscow	Krasnodar
14:00 MSK (UTC+3)	Suleymanov 42'; Vilhena (yellow card) 46'; Wanderson (yellow card) 56'	Report	Krychowiak 5'; Zhivoglyadov (yellow card) 38'; Zhemaletdinov (yellow card) 55'; Idowu (yellow card) 83'	Stadium: Krasnodar Stadium; Attendance: 31,231; Referee: Vladislav Bezborodov

1 September 2019 8	Ural Yekaterinburg	2 – 4	Krasnodar	Yekaterinburg
14:00 MSK (UTC+3)	Bavin 21'; El Kabir 68'; Boumal (yellow card) 82'	Report	Skopintsev 19'; Ari 38'; Olsson (yellow card) 59'; Utkin 80'; Wanderson 82'; Petrov (yellow card) 90+3'	Stadium: Central Stadium; Attendance: 18,388; Referee: Aleksey Sukhoy

15 September 2019 9	Krasnodar	4 – 2	Krylia Sovetov	Krasnodar
19:00 MSK (UTC+3)	Suleymanov 16'; Kambolov (yellow card) 45+2'; Olsson 48'; Martynovich (yellow card) 50'; Ryzhikov 57' (o.g.); Ari (penalty missed) 67' 67'; Spajić (yellow card) 74'; Vilhena (yellow card) 81'	Report	Sobolev 12' (penalty missed) 45+3'; Kabutov (yellow card) 34'; Gațcan (yellow card) 66'; Anton 75' (pen.)	Stadium: Krasnodar Stadium; Attendance: 26,131; Referee: Sergei Karasev

22 September 2019 10	CSKA Moscow	3 – 2	Krasnodar	Moscow
19:00 MSK (UTC+3)	Akhmetov (yellow card) 23'; Vlašić 32' (pen.), 41' (yellow card) 90+5'; Chalov 37'	Report	Skopintsev (yellow card) 40'; Berg 57', 60'; Suleymanov (yellow card) 58'; Martynovich (yellow card) 90+7'	Stadium: VEB Arena; Attendance: 21,026; Referee: Vladislav Bezborodov

29 September 2019 11	Krasnodar	2 – 0	Arsenal Tula	Krasnodar
19:00 MSK (UTC+3)	Ari 38' (pen.); Olsson (yellow card) 45'; Suleymanov 63'; Vilhena (red card) 90+2'; Martynovich (yellow card) 90+6'	Report	Lomovitsky (yellow card) 43'	Stadium: Krasnodar Stadium; Referee: Vasili Kazartsev

6 October 2019 12	Krasnodar	2 – 1	Spartak Moscow	Krasnodar
19:00 MSK (UTC+3)	Berg 3'; Petrov 20'; Olsson (yellow card) 64'; Ramírez (yellow card) 67'; Kaio (yellow card) 70' (yellow-red card) 88'; Ari (yellow card) 85'	Report	Mirzov (yellow card) 33'; Larsson 45'; Kutepov (yellow card) 90'; Dzhikiya (yellow card) 90+2' (yellow-red card) 90+2'	Stadium: Krasnodar Stadium; Attendance: 32,238; Referee: Vitaly Meshkov

20 October 2019 13	Dynamo Moscow	1 – 1	Krasnodar	Moscow
19:00 MSK (UTC+3)	Morozov 3'; Igboun (yellow card) 33'; Rykov (yellow card) 45+1'; Kaboré (yellow card) 54'; Neustädter (yellow card) 72'; Rausch (yellow card) 81'	Report	Spajić (yellow card) 17'; Berg (yellow card) 32'; Martynovich 35'; Suleymanov (yellow card) 87'	Stadium: VTB Arena; Attendance: 15,374; Referee: Mikhail Vilkov

27 October 2019 14	Krasnodar	1 – 1	Orenburg	Krasnodar
19:00 MSK (UTC+3)	Fernandes 43'; Berg (red card) 80'	Report	Despotović (yellow card) 19' (goal) 32'	Stadium: Krasnodar Stadium; Attendance: 30,638; Referee: Aleksei Matyunin

3 November 2019 15	Krasnodar	2 – 2	Rostov	Krasnodar
16:30 MSK (UTC+3)	Ignatyev 90+3'; Spajić 90+5'	Report	Ionov 34', 41'; Popov (yellow card) 53'; Eremenko (yellow card) 57'; Chistyakov (yellow card) 63'; Zaynutdinov (yellow card) 77'	Stadium: Krasnodar Stadium; Attendance: 34,265; Referee: Aleksei Eskov

10 November 2019 16	Lokomotiv Moscow	1 – 1	Krasnodar	Moscow
19:00 MSK (UTC+3)	João Mário (yellow card) 19'; Krychowiak 41'; Zhemaletdinov (yellow card) 52'; Ignatyev (yellow card) 65'; Kulikov (yellow card) 72'	Report	Ramírez (yellow card) 27'; Spajić (yellow card) 40'; Ari (yellow card) 45+1'; Berg 45+2' (yellow card) 48'; Olsson (yellow card) 70'	Stadium: RZD Arena; Attendance: 17,612; Referee: Vladislav Bezborodov

24 November 2019 17	Arsenal Tula	1 – 2	Krasnodar	Tula
16:30 MSK (UTC+3)	Álvarez (yellow card) 24'; Lutsenko 43'; Shamov (yellow card) 62'; Grigalava (yellow card) 90+4'	Report	Vilhena 7' (yellow card) 67'; Martynovich (yellow card) 16'; Petrov 25'; Berg (yellow card) 26'; Utkin (yellow card) 61'; Ignatyev (penalty missed) 63' (yellow card) 90+2'	Stadium: Arsenal Stadium; Attendance: 7,815; Referee: Stanislav Vasilyev

2 December 2019 18	Krasnodar	0 – 0	Tambov	Krasnodar
19:30 MSK (UTC+3)	Suleymanov (yellow card) 12'; Spajić (yellow card) 90+5'	Report	Melkadze (yellow card) 32'	Stadium: Krasnodar Stadium; Attendance: 15,439; Referee: Sergey Lapochkin

7 December 2019 19	Krasnodar	1 – 1	CSKA Moscow	Krasnodar
16:30 MSK (UTC+3)	Ari (penalty missed) 63' 63'; Vilhena (yellow card) 90+10'	Report	Oblyakov 15' (yellow card) 62'; Vlašić (yellow card) 42'; Dzagoev (yellow card) 57'; Chalov (yellow card) 65'; Nababkin (yellow card) 74'; Diveyev (yellow card) 90+1'	Stadium: Krasnodar Stadium; Attendance: 29,567; Referee: Vasili Kazartsev

1 March 2020 20	Krasnodar	2 – 0	Ufa	Krasnodar
16:30 MSK (UTC+3)	Petrov (yellow card) 45+1'; Kaio (yellow card) 48'; Olsson (yellow card) 58'; Berg 67'; Wanderson (yellow card) 70'; Ari 83' (pen.)	Report	Sukhov (yellow card) 24'; Thill (yellow card) 67'; Jokić (yellow card) 80'; Belenov (yellow card) 81'; Vombergar (yellow card) 84'	Stadium: Krasnodar Stadium; Attendance: 31,966; Referee: Stanislav Vasilyev

9 March 2020 21	Spartak Moscow	0 – 1	Krasnodar	Moscow
16:30 MSK (UTC+3)	Yeshchenko (yellow card) 41'; Gigot (yellow card) 45+1'; Zobnin (yellow card) 63' (yellow-red card) 90+2'; Sobolev (yellow card) 77'	Report	Chernikov (yellow card) 25'; Ramírez (yellow card) 37'; Ari 71' (pen.) (yellow card) 83'	Stadium: Otkritie Arena; Attendance: 28,245; Referee: Sergey Lapochkin

15 March 2020 22	Sochi	2 – 0	Krasnodar	Sochi
14:00 MSK (UTC+3)	Noboa 47' (yellow card) 64'; Tsallagov (yellow card) 90'; Mostovoy 90+3'	Report	Suleymanov (yellow card) 90'	Stadium: Fisht Olympic Stadium; Referee: Sergey Ivanov

27 June 2020 24	Orenburg	0 – 3	Krasnodar	Orenburg
14:00 MSK (UTC+3)				Stadium: Gazovik Stadium
Note: Match originally scheduled for 5 April, but postponed on 17 March due to the COVID-19 pandemic. On 26 June it was the match would not take place due to an outbreak of COVID-19 in the Orenburg squad, and was awarded as a 3-0 victory to Krasnodar.

1 July 2020 25	Rostov	1 – 1	Krasnodar	Rostov-on-Don
20:00 MSK (UTC+3)	Shomurodov (yellow card) 59'; Mamayev (yellow card) 65'; Saplinov (yellow card) 65'; Zaynutdinov (yellow card) 68'; Popov 90+11' (pen.); Dolgov (yellow card) 90+16'	Report	Berg 13'; Chernikov (yellow card) 79'; Safonov (yellow card) 89'; Suleymanov (yellow card) 90+7'; Fernandes (yellow card) 90+8'	Stadium: Rostov Arena; Referee: Vitali Meshkov
Note: Match originally scheduled for 11 April, but postponed on 1 April due to the COVID-19 pandemic.

5 July 2020 26	Krasnodar	2 – 4	Zenit St.Petersburg	Krasnodar
20:30 MSK (UTC+3)	Utkin 29', 50'; Wanderson (penalty missed) 41'; Petrov (yellow card) 46'; Olsson (yellow card) 56'; Vilhena (yellow card) 58'; Martynovich (yellow card) 60'; Berg (yellow card) 73'	Report	Azmoun 5', 52'; Barrios (yellow card) 22'; Dzyuba 45+1' (pen.); Kuzyayev (yellow card) 45+3'; Sutormin 72'; Driussi (yellow card) 78'	Stadium: Krasnodar Stadium; Referee: Sergei Karasev
Note: Match originally scheduled for 19 April, but postponed on 1 April due to the COVID-19 pandemic.

9 July 2020 27	Rubin Kazan	1 – 0	Krasnodar	Kazan
20:30 MSK (UTC+3)	Makarov 51'; Abildgaard (yellow card) 57'	Report	Vilhena (yellow card) 32'; Suleymanov (yellow card) 59'; Fernandes (yellow card) 66'; Kaio (yellow card) 90+4'; Gazinsky (yellow card) 90+4'	Stadium: Central Stadium; Referee: Stanislav Vasilyev
Note: Match originally scheduled for 25 April, but postponed on 1 April due to the COVID-19 pandemic.

12 July 2020 28	Krasnodar	3 – 0	Ural Yekaterinburg	Krasnodar
20:30 MSK (UTC+3)	Berg 13'; Kaio (yellow card) 40'; Fernandes 57'; Sorokin (yellow card) 77'; Cabella 82' (pen.)	Report	Kalinin (yellow card) 12'; Zolotov (yellow card) 81'	Stadium: Krasnodar Stadium; Referee: Kirill Levnikov
Note: Match originally scheduled for 1 May, but postponed on 1 April due to the COVID-19 pandemic.

15 July 2020 29	Krylia Sovetov	0 – 0	Krasnodar	Samara
18:00 MSK (UTC+3)	Kabutov (yellow card) 42'; Timofeyev (yellow card) 72'	Report	Fernandes (yellow card) 15'; Petrov (yellow card) 39' (yellow-red card) 82'; Utkin (yellow card) 65'; Ramírez (yellow card) 70'; Wanderson (yellow card) 90+2'	Stadium: Samara Arena; Referee: Vladimir Moskalev
Note: Match originally scheduled for 11 May, but postponed on 1 April due to the COVID-19 pandemic.

19 July 2020 23	Krasnodar	0 – 2	Dynamo Moscow	Krasnodar
20:30 MSK (UTC+3)	Safonov (red card) 17'; Utkin (yellow card) 29'; Olsson (yellow card) 45'	Report	Grulyov 26'; Morozov (yellow card) 47'; Rykov (yellow card) 66'; Sosnin (yellow card) 83'; Joãozinho 90'	Stadium: Krasnodar Stadium; Referee: Mikhail Vilkov
Note: Match originally scheduled for 22 March, but postponed on 17 March due to the COVID-19 pandemic. Match then scheduled for 21 June, but postponed on the same day due to an outbreak of COVID-19 within the Dynamo Moscow squad.

22 July 2020 30	Krasnodar	4 – 0	Akhmat Grozny	Krasnodar
19:00 MSK (UTC+3)	Wanderson (yellow card) 20' (goal) 58'; Berg 43', 62'; Cabella 54'	Report	Kharin (yellow card) 8'; Berisha (yellow card) 24'; Ivanov (yellow card) 64'; Adamov (yellow card) 82'	Stadium: Krasnodar Stadium; Referee: Vladislav Bezborodov
Note: Match originally scheduled for 17 May, but postponed on 1 April due to the COVID-19 pandemic.

==== League table ====
Pos	Team	Pld	W	D	L	GF	GA	GD	Pts	Qualification or relegation
1	Zenit Saint Petersburg (C)	30	22	6	2	65	18	+47	72	Qualification for the Champions League group stage
2	Lokomotiv Moscow	30	16	9	5	41	29	+12	57	Qualification for the Champions League group stage
3	Krasnodar	30	14	10	6	49	30	+19	52	Qualification for the Champions League play-off round
4	CSKA Moscow	30	14	8	8	43	29	+14	50	Qualification for the Europa League group stage
5	Rostov	30	12	9	9	45	50	−5	45	Qualification for the Europa League third qualifying round

Source: Russian Premier Liga, Soccerway
Rules for classification: 1) Points; 2) Head-to-head points; 3) Head-to-head matches won; 4) Head-to-head goal difference; 5) Head-to-head goals scored; 6) Matches won; 7) Goal difference; 8) Goals scored; 9) Play-off.
(C) Champions

=== Russian Cup ===
25 September 2019 Round of 32	Nizhny Novgorod	1 – 0	Krasnodar	Nizhny Novgorod
19:00 MSK (UTC+3)	Komolov (yellow card) 56'; Zuyev (yellow card) 68'; Stavpets 78'; Lebedev (yellow card) 87'	Report	Kaio (yellow card) 17'; Kambolov (yellow card) 22'; Spajić (yellow card) 67'	Stadium: Nizhny Novgorod Stadium; Attendance: 17,870; Referee: Ivan Sidenkov

=== UEFA Champions League ===
==== Qualifying rounds ====
7 August 2019 Third qualifying round 1st leg	Krasnodar (Russia)	0 – 1	(Portugal) Porto	Krasnodar, Russia
20:00 MSK (UTC+3)	Kambolov (yellow card) 27'	Report	Pereira (yellow card) 38'; Baró (yellow card) 49'; Corona (yellow card) 63'; Oliveira 89'	Stadium: Krasnodar Stadium; Attendance: 34,874; Referee: Tobias Stieler (Germany)

13 August 2019 Third qualifying round 2nd leg	Porto (Portugal)	2 – 3 (3 – 3 a agg.)	(Russia) Krasnodar	Porto, Portugal
22:00 MSK (UTC+3)	Marega (yellow card) 53'; Zé Luís 57' (yellow card) 90+5'; Uribe (yellow card) 61'; Díaz 76'	Report	Vilhena 3' (yellow card) 45'; Suleymanov 13', 34'; Kambolov (yellow card) 39'; Stotsky (yellow card) 82'; Spajić (yellow card) 90+5'	Stadium: Estádio do Dragão; Attendance: 48,520; Referee: Marco Guida (Italy)

21 August 2019 Playoff round 1st leg	Olympiacos (Greece)	4 – 0	(Russia) Krasnodar	Piraeus, Greece
22:00 MSK (UTC+3)	Guerrero 30'; Ranđelović 78', 85' (yellow card) 87'; Torosidis (yellow card) 79'; Podence 89'	Report		Stadium: Karaiskakis Stadium; Attendance: 29,132; Referee: Carlos del Cerro Grande (Spain)

27 August 2019 Playoff round 2nd leg	Krasnodar (Russia)	1 – 2 (1 – 6 agg.)	(Greece) Olympiacos	Krasnodar, Russia
22:00 MSK (UTC+3)	Utkin 10'; Stotsky (yellow card) 25'; Namli (yellow card) 70'; Olsson (yellow card) 75'; Spajić (yellow card) 76'	Report	El-Arabi 11', 48'	Stadium: Krasnodar Stadium; Attendance: 34,627; Referee: Damir Skomina (Slovenia)

=== UEFA Europa League ===
==== Group stage ====
Pos	Team	Pld	W	D	L	GF	GA	GD	Pts	Qualification
1	(Switzerland) Basel	6	4	1	1	12	4	+8	13	Advance to knockout phase
2	(Spain) Getafe	6	4	0	2	8	4	+4	12	Advance to knockout phase
3	(Russia) Krasnodar	6	3	0	3	7	11	−4	9	
4	(Turkey) Trabzonspor	6	0	1	5	3	11	−8	1	

Source: UEFA
Rules for classification: Group stage tiebreakers

19 September 2019 1	Basel (Switzerland)	5 – 0	(Russia) Krasnodar	Basel, Switzerland
19:55 MSK (UTC+3)	Bua 9', 40'; Stocker (yellow card) 51'; Zuffi 52'; Vilhena 55' (o.g.); Okafor 59'	Report	Martynovich (yellow card) 64'	Stadium: St. Jakob-Park; Attendance: 14,127; Referee: Mattias Gestranius (Finland)

3 October 2019 2	Krasnodar (Russia)	1 – 2	(Spain) Getafe	Krasnodar, Russia
22:00 MSK (UTC+3)	Vilhena (yellow card) 40'; Fjóluson (yellow card) 43'; Berg (yellow card) 52'; Ari (yellow card) 63' (goal) 69'	Report	Ángel 36', 61' (yellow card) 83'; Bruno (yellow card) 62'; Timor (yellow card) 63' (yellow-red card) 81'; García (yellow card) 75'	Stadium: Krasnodar Stadium; Attendance: 20,035; Referee: Ivan Bebek (Croatia)

24 October 2019 3	Trabzonspor (Turkey)	0 – 2	(Russia) Krasnodar	Trabzon, Turkey
22:00 MSK (UTC+3)	Pereira (yellow card) 49'; Sosa (yellow card) 54'; Fernandes (yellow card) 78'	Report	Olsson (yellow card) 29'; Spajić (yellow card) 31'; Berg 49'; Ramírez (yellow card) 63'; Vilhena 90+2'	Stadium: Şenol Güneş Stadium; Attendance: 26,405; Referee: Harald Lechner (Austria)

7 November 2019 4	Krasnodar (Russia)	3 – 1	(Turkey) Trabzonspor	Krasnodar, Russia
20:55 MSK (UTC+3)	Spajić (yellow card) 19'; Asan 27' (o.g.); Fernandes 34'; Ignatyev 90+3'	Report	Campi (yellow card) 64'; Nwakaeme 90+4'	Stadium: Krasnodar Stadium; Attendance: 21,669; Referee: Benoît Bastien (France)

28 November 2019 5	Krasnodar (Russia)	1 – 0	(Switzerland) Basel	Krasnodar, Russia
18:50 MSK (UTC+3)	Wanderson (yellow card) 52'; Gazinsky (yellow card) 63'; Ari 72' (pen.) (yellow card) 73' (yellow-red card) 90+5'; Ramírez (yellow card) 75'; Martynovich (yellow card) 90+3'	Report	Frei (yellow card) 90+3'; Alderete (yellow card) 90+6'	Stadium: Krasnodar Stadium; Attendance: 22,826; Referee: Bobby Madden (Scotland)

12 December 2019 6	Getafe (Spain)	3 – 0	(Russia) Krasnodar	Getafe, Spain
19:55 MSK (UTC+3)	Suárez (yellow card) 26'; Cabrera 76'; Molina 79'; Kenedy 86'	Report	Martynovich (yellow card) 14' (yellow-red card) 88'; Gazinsky (yellow card) 26'; Spajić (yellow card) 43'	Stadium: Coliseum Alfonso Pérez; Referee: Daniel Siebert (Germany)

== Squad statistics ==
As of match played 22 July 2020

=== Appearances and goals ===
No.	Pos	Nat	Player	Total		Premier League		Russian Cup		Champions League		Europa League	
No.	Pos	Nat	Player	Apps	Goals	Apps	Goals	Apps	Goals	Apps	Goals	Apps	Goals
1	GK	(Russia) RUS	Stanislav Kritsyuk	6	0	1	0	1	0	1	0	3	0
2	DF	(Russia) RUS	Yegor Sorokin	8	0	6+2	0	0	0	0	0	0	0
3	DF	(Iceland) ISL	Jón Fjóluson	17	0	8+2	0	1	0	2+2	0	1+1	0
4	DF	(Belarus) BLR	Alyaksandr Martynovich	30	1	21+1	1	0	0	2	0	6	0
5	DF	(Serbia) SRB	Uroš Spajić	26	1	15	1	1	0	4	0	6	0
6	DF	(Ecuador) ECU	Cristian Ramírez	36	0	24+2	0	1	0	3	0	6	0
7	MF	(France) FRA	Rémy Cabella	12	2	5+4	2	0	0	3	0	0	0
8	MF	(Russia) RUS	Yury Gazinsky	13	0	10+1	0	0	0	0	0	2	0
9	FW	(Russia) RUS	Ari	23	8	18	6	0	0	0+1	0	2+2	2
10	MF	(Brazil) BRA	Wanderson	28	3	20+1	3	0	0	4	0	3	0
14	MF	(Sweden) SWE	Kristoffer Olsson	34	1	23+4	1	0	0	1+1	0	5	0
31	MF	(Brazil) BRA	Kaio	12	0	10+1	0	1	0	0	0	0	0
33	FW	(Sweden) SWE	Marcus Berg	32	10	15+8	9	1	0	4	0	3+1	1
37	FW	(Russia) RUS	Ilya Vorotnikov	1	0	0+1	0	0	0	0	0	0	0
39	GK	(Russia) RUS	Matvei Safonov	33	0	27	0	0	0	3	0	3	0
47	MF	(Russia) RUS	Daniil Utkin	29	5	12+10	4	0+1	0	1	1	0+5	0
52	MF	(Netherlands) NED	Tonny Vilhena	30	4	20	2	0	0	4	1	6	1
53	MF	(Russia) RUS	Alexander Chernikov	7	0	3+3	0	0+1	0	0	0	0	0
60	FW	(Russia) RUS	German Onugkha	3	0	0+2	0	0+1	0	0	0	0	0
62	MF	(Russia) RUS	Aleks Matsukatov	2	0	0+2	0	0	0	0	0	0	0
63	FW	(Russia) RUS	Nikita Sergeyev	4	0	0+4	0	0	0	0	0	0	0
66	GK	(Russia) RUS	Denis Adamov	2	0	1+1	0	0	0	0	0	0	0
67	FW	(Russia) RUS	Maksim Kutovoy	3	0	0+3	0	0	0	0	0	0	0
77	MF	(Russia) RUS	Ruslan Kambolov	24	0	10+6	0	1	0	3	0	2+2	0
89	MF	(Russia) RUS	Dmitry Stotsky	17	0	9+3	0	1	0	1+1	0	2	0
93	FW	(Russia) RUS	Magomed-Shapi Suleymanov	38	6	12+15	4	1	0	2+2	2	6	0
98	DF	(Russia) RUS	Sergei Petrov	37	2	27	2	0	0	4	0	6	0
99	MF	(Portugal) POR	Manuel Fernandes	19	3	10+6	2	0	0	0	0	1+2	1
Players away from the club on loan:
21	MF	(Denmark) DEN	Younes Namli	18	1	6+4	1	1	0	2+1	0	1+3	0
Players who left Krasnodar during the season:
11	MF	(Russia) RUS	Dmitri Skopintsev	8	1	2+3	1	1	0	0+1	0	0+1	0
17	FW	(Russia) RUS	Ivan Ignatyev	19	5	5+8	4	0	0	0+3	0	2+1	1

=== Goal scorers ===
Place	Position	Nation	Number	Name	Premier League	Russian Cup	Champions League	Europa League	Total
1	FW	(Sweden)	33	Marcus Berg	9	0	0	1	10
2	FW	(Russia)	9	Ari	6	0	0	2	8
3	FW	(Russia)	93	Magomed-Shapi Suleymanov	4	0	2	0	6
4	MF	(Russia)	47	Daniil Utkin	4	0	1	0	5
4	FW	(Russia)	17	Ivan Ignatyev	4	0	0	1	5
6	MF	(Netherlands)	52	Tonny Vilhena	2	0	1	1	4
6				Own goal	3	0	0	1	4
8	MF	(Brazil)	10	Wanderson	3	0	0	0	3
8	MF	(Portugal)	99	Manuel Fernandes	2	0	0	1	3
10	DF	(Russia)	98	Sergei Petrov	2	0	0	0	2
10	MF	(France)	7	Rémy Cabella	2	0	0	0	2
12	MF	(Denmark)	21	Younes Namli	1	0	0	0	1
12	MF	(Russia)	11	Dmitri Skopintsev	1	0	0	0	1
12	MF	(Sweden)	14	Kristoffer Olsson	1	0	0	0	1
12	DF	(Belarus)	4	Alyaksandr Martynovich	1	0	0	0	1
12	DF	(Serbia)	5	Uroš Spajić	1	0	0	0	1
				TOTALS	46	0	4	7	57

=== Clean sheets ===
Place	Position	Nation	Number	Name	Premier League	Russian Cup	Champions League	Europa League	Total
1	GK	(Russia)	39	Matvei Safonov	8	0	0	1	9
2	GK	(Russia)	1	Stanislav Kritsyuk	1	0	0	1	2
3	GK	(Russia)	66	Denis Adamov	1	0	0	0	1
				TOTALS	10	0	0	2	12

=== Disciplinary record ===
Number	Nation	Position	Name	Premier League		Russian Cup		Champions League		Europa League		Total	
Number	Nation	Position	Name	Yellow card	Red card	Yellow card	Red card	Yellow card	Red card	Yellow card	Red card	Yellow card	Red card
2	(Russia)	DF	Yegor Sorokin	1	0	0	0	0	0	0	0	1	0
3	(Iceland)	DF	Jón Fjóluson	0	0	0	0	0	0	1	0	1	0
4	(Belarus)	DF	Alyaksandr Martynovich	5	0	0	0	0	0	4	1	9	1
5	(Serbia)	DF	Uroš Spajić	5	0	1	0	2	0	3	0	11	0
6	(Ecuador)	DF	Cristian Ramírez	7	0	0	0	0	0	2	0	9	0
7	(France)	MF	Rémy Cabella	2	0	0	0	0	0	0	0	2	0
8	(Russia)	MF	Yury Gazinsky	1	0	0	0	0	0	2	0	3	0
9	(Russia)	FW	Ari	5	0	0	0	0	0	3	1	8	1
10	(Brazil)	MF	Wanderson	4	0	0	0	0	0	1	0	5	0
14	(Sweden)	MF	Kristoffer Olsson	7	0	0	0	1	0	1	0	9	0
31	(Brazil)	MF	Kaio	5	1	1	0	0	0	0	0	6	1
33	(Sweden)	FW	Marcus Berg	4	1	0	0	0	0	1	0	5	1
39	(Russia)	GK	Matvei Safonov	1	1	0	0	0	0	0	0	1	1
47	(Russia)	MF	Daniil Utkin	3	0	0	0	0	0	0	0	3	0
52	(Netherlands)	MF	Tonny Vilhena	8	1	0	0	1	0	1	0	10	1
53	(Russia)	MF	Alexander Chernikov	2	0	0	0	0	0	0	0	2	0
77	(Russia)	MF	Ruslan Kambolov	3	0	1	0	2	0	0	0	6	0
89	(Russia)	MF	Dmitry Stotsky	0	0	0	0	2	0	0	0	2	0
93	(Russia)	FW	Magomed-Shapi Suleymanov	7	0	0	0	0	0	0	0	7	0
98	(Russia)	DF	Sergei Petrov	7	1	0	0	0	0	0	0	7	1
99	(Portugal)	MF	Manuel Fernandes	2	0	0	0	0	0	0	0	2	0
Players away on loan:
21	(Denmark)	MF	Younes Namli	2	1	0	0	1	0	0	0	3	1
Players who left Krasnodar during the season:
11	(Russia)	MF	Dmitri Skopintsev	1	0	0	0	0	0	0	0	1	0
17	(Russia)	FW	Ivan Ignatyev	1	0	0	0	0	0	0	0	1	0
			TOTALS	83	6	3	0	9	0	19	2	114	8
