= 2017–18 FC Krasnodar season =

FC Krasnodar
2017–18 season
- Chairman: Sergey Galitsky
- Manager: Igor Shalimov (until 2 April 2018); Murad Musayev (caretaker) (from 3 April 2018)
- Stadium: Krasnodar Stadium
- Russian Premier League: 4th
- Russian Cup: Round of 32 (vs. Tom Tomsk)
- Europa League: Play-off round (vs. Red Star Belgrade)
- Top goalscorer: League: Fyodor Smolov (14); All: Fyodor Smolov (14)
Home colours	Away colours	Third colours

The 2017–18 FC Krasnodar season was the seventh successive season that Krasnodar played in the Russian Premier League, the highest tier of association football in Russia. They finished the season in 4th place, and as a result of FC Tosno failing to obtain a UEFA licence for there 2018–19 UEFA Europa League Group Stage spot, qualified directly for the Groups Stage of the UEFA Europa League. Krasnodar were also knocked out of the Russian cup at the round of 32 stage by FC Tom Tomsk and the knocked out of the 2017–18 UEFA Europa League at the playoff round stage by Red Star Belgrade.

== Season events ==
On 2 April 2018, Igor Shalimov was sacked as the club's manager, with Murad Musayev being appointed as the club's caretaker manager the following day.

== Squad ==
As of 9 February 2018

Note: Flags indicate national team as defined under FIFA eligibility rules; some limited exceptions apply. Players may hold more than one non-FIFA nationality.

No.	Pos.	Nation	Player
1	GK	RUS	Stanislav Kritsyuk
4	DF	BLR	Alyaksandr Martynovich (Vice-captain)
6	DF	SWE	Andreas Granqvist (Captain)
7	MF	BRA	Wanderson
8	MF	RUS	Yury Gazinsky
9	FW	ROU	Andrei Ivan
10	FW	RUS	Fyodor Smolov
12	DF	ECU	Cristian Ramírez
13	DF	RUS	Ihor Kalinin
16	MF	SWE	Viktor Claesson
17	MF	RUS	Pavel Mamayev
18	DF	RUS	Oleg Shatov (on loan from Zenit St. Petersburg)
21	MF	COL	Ricardo Laborde

No.	Pos.	Nation	Player
22	MF	BRA	Joãozinho
26	DF	RUS	Aleksei Gritsayenko
30	DF	RUS	Roman Shishkin
33	MF	URU	Mauricio Pereyra
39	GK	RUS	Matvei Safonov
55	DF	RUS	Renat Yanbayev
70	MF	GEO	Tornike Okriashvili
77	MF	BFA	Charles Kaboré
85	FW	RUS	Ivan Ignatyev
88	GK	RUS	Andrei Sinitsyn
90	DF	NOR	Stefan Strandberg
93	FW	RUS	Magomed-Shapi Suleymanov
98	DF	RUS	Sergei Petrov

=== Out on loan ===
Note: Flags indicate national team as defined under FIFA eligibility rules; some limited exceptions apply. Players may hold more than one non-FIFA nationality.

No.	Pos.	Nation	Player
—	DF	RUS	Leo Goglichidze (at Olimpiyets Nizhny Novgorod until 30 June 2018)
—	DF	RUS	Yevgeny Nesterenko (at Chayka Peschanokopskoye until 30 June 2018)
—	DF	RUS	Maksim Starkov (at Dynamo Bryansk until 30 June 2018)
—	MF	RUS	Daniil Fomin (at Olimpiyets Nizhny Novgorod until 30 June 2018)
—	MF	RUS	Oleg Lanin (at Krylia Sovetov Samara until 30 June 2018)
—	MF	RUS	Aleksandr Morgunov (at Afips Afipsky until 30 June 2018)
—	MF	RUS	Vyacheslav Podberyozkin (at Rubin Kazan until 30 June 2018)
—	MF	SRB	Mihailo Ristić (at Sparta Prague until 31 December 2018)

No.	Pos.	Nation	Player
—	MF	RUS	Ilya Zhigulyov (at Tosno until 30 June 2018)
—	FW	BRA	Ari (at Lokomotiv Moscow until 30 June 2018)
—	FW	RUS	Dmitri Bakay (at Chernomorets Novorossiysk until 30 June 2018)
—	FW	RUS	Ilya Belous (at Afips Afipsky until 30 June 2018)
—	FW	RUS	Ruslan Bolov (at Avangard Kursk until 30 June 2018)
—	FW	RUS	Nikolay Komlichenko (at Mladá Boleslav until 30 June 2018)
—	FW	RUS	Dmitri Vorobyov (at Afips Afipsky until 30 June 2018)

== Transfers ==
=== Summer ===
In: Note: Flags indicate national team as defined under FIFA eligibility rules; some limited exceptions apply. Players may hold more than one non-FIFA nationality.

No.	Pos.	Nation	Player
7	FW	BRA	Wanderson (from (Austria) Red Bull Salzburg)
9	FW	ROU	Andrei Ivan (from (Romania) Universitatea Craiova)
26	DF	RUS	Aleksei Gritsayenko (from (Russia) Luch-Energiya Vladivostok)
27	MF	SRB	Mihailo Ristić (from (Serbia) Red Star Belgrade)
30	DF	RUS	Roman Shishkin (from (Russia) Lokomotiv Moscow, previously on loan)
35	MF	RUS	Sergei Peterson
37	FW	RUS	Ilya Vorotnikov
51	FW	RUS	Shamil Mavlyanov
55	DF	RUS	Renat Yanbayev (from (Russia) Lokomotiv Moscow)
56	FW	RUS	Ilya Belous (end of loan to (Moldova) Milsami Orhei)
64	MF	RUS	Aleksandr Morgunov (end of loan to (Moldova) Milsami Orhei)
73	GK	RUS	Nikita Yegyazarov
79	DF	RUS	Yevgeni Nesterenko (end of loan to (Russia) Afips Afipsky)
89	FW	RUS	Aleksandr Ageyev (end of loan to (Russia) Energomash Belgorod)
90	DF	NOR	Stefan Strandberg (end of loan to (Germany) Hannover 96)

Out: Note: Flags indicate national team as defined under FIFA eligibility rules; some limited exceptions apply. Players may hold more than one non-FIFA nationality.

No.	Pos.	Nation	Player
3	DF	BRA	Naldo (to (Spain) Espanyol)
5	MF	RUS	Dmitri Torbinski
5	DF	RUS	Aleksandr Zhirov (to (Russia) Krasnodar-2, previously on loan to (Russia) Anzhi Makhachkala)
14	FW	BRA	Wánderson (to (Russia) Dynamo Moscow)
17	DF	RUS	Vitali Kaleshin (retired)
18	MF	RUS	Vladimir Bystrov (to (Russia) Tosno)
19	GK	RUS	Ilya Abayev (end of loan from (Russia) Lokomotiv Moscow)
20	FW	RUS	Nikolay Komlichenko (on loan to (Czech Republic) Mladá Boleslav)
32	DF	RUS	Vasili Cherov
35	FW	RUS	Alim Makoyev (to (Russia) Kubanskaya Korona Shevchenko)
37	DF	RUS	Grigori Ziganshin
49	FW	RUS	Dmitri Bakay (on loan to (Russia) Chernomorets Novorossiysk)
51	GK	RUS	Ivan Salnikov (to (Spain) Getafe)
59	MF	RUS	Ilya Borisov (on loan to (Russia) Chayka Peschanokopskoye, previously on loan to (Russia) Armavir)
74	MF	RUS	Daniil Fomin (on loan to (Russia) Olimpiyets Nizhny Novgorod)
76	FW	RUS	Ruslan Rzayev
97	FW	RUS	Nurik Gadzhiyev
—	GK	RUS	Denis Kavlinov (to (Russia) Kuban Krasnodar, previously on loan to (Russia) Dynamo St. Petersburg)
—	DF	RUS	Aleksandr Marchenko (on loan to (Russia) Luch-Energiya Vladivostok, previously on loan to (Russia) Spartak Nalchik)
—	DF	RUS	Maksim Starkov (on loan to (Russia) Dynamo Bryansk, previously on loan to (Russia) Dynamo St. Petersburg)
—	MF	RUS	Oleg Lanin (on loan to (Russia) Krylia Sovetov Samara, previously on loan to (Russia) Yenisey Krasnoyarsk)
—	FW	RUS	Ruslan Bolov (on loan to (Russia) Avangard Kursk, previously on loan to (Russia) Fakel Voronezh)

=== Winter ===
In: Note: Flags indicate national team as defined under FIFA eligibility rules; some limited exceptions apply. Players may hold more than one non-FIFA nationality.

No.	Pos.	Nation	Player
13	DF	RUS	Ihor Kalinin (from (Russia) Volgar Astrakhan)
18	MF	RUS	Oleg Shatov (on loan from (Russia) Zenit St. Petersburg)
32	DF	RUS	Dmitri Pivovarov
42	FW	RUS	Nikita Shershnyov
59	MF	RUS	Mikhail Kolomiytsev
69	DF	RUS	Mamma Mammayev
74	MF	RUS	Eduard Spertsyan
89	FW	RUS	Ruslan Apekov

Out: Note: Flags indicate national team as defined under FIFA eligibility rules; some limited exceptions apply. Players may hold more than one non-FIFA nationality.

No.	Pos.	Nation	Player
5	DF	RUS	Aleksandr Zhirov (to (Russia) Yenisey Krasnoyarsk)
11	MF	RUS	Vyacheslav Podberyozkin (on loan to (Russia) Rubin Kazan)
15	MF	RUS	Ilya Zhigulyov (on loan to (Russia) Tosno)
27	MF	SRB	Mihailo Ristić (on loan to (Czech Republic) Sparta Prague)
42	DF	RUS	Dmitri Bubenin
56	FW	RUS	Ilya Belous (on loan to (Russia) Afips Afipsky)
64	MF	RUS	Aleksandr Morgunov (on loan to (Russia) Afips Afipsky)
78	FW	RUS	Dmitri Vorobyov (on loan to (Russia) Afips Afipsky)
79	DF	RUS	Yevgeni Nesterenko (on loan to (Russia) Chayka Peschanokopskoye)
89	FW	RUS	Aleksandr Ageyev
91	DF	RUS	Leo Goglichidze (on loan to (Russia) Olimpiyets Nizhny Novgorod)
95	FW	RUS	Araik Ovsepyan
—	DF	RUS	Aleksandr Marchenko (released, previously on loan to (Russia) Luch-Energiya Vladivostok)
—	MF	RUS	Ilya Borisov (released, previously on loan to (Russia) Chayka Peschanokopskoye)

== Competitions ==
=== Russian Premier League ===
==== Results by round ====
Round	1	2	3	4	5	6	7	8	9	10	11	12	13	14	15	16	17	18	19	20	21	22	23	24	25	26	27	28	29	30
Ground	A	H	A	H	A	H	A	H	A	A	H	A	H	A	H	A	H	A	H	A	H	A	H	H	A	H	A	H	A	H
Result	W	W	L	D	W	D	D	W	W	W	L	L	L	L	W	W	L	W	W	W	W	D	L	D	W	W	L	W	W	D
Position	3	2	5	5	3	5	5	4	3	2	3	3	4	6	4	3	5	5	5	4	2	4	4	5	3	3	5	5	4	4

Updated to match(es) played on 13 May 2018. Source: See Results
A = Away; H = Home; W = Win; D = Draw; L = Loss

==== Results ====
16 July 2017 1	Rubin Kazan	1 – 2	Krasnodar	Kazan
17:30 MSK (UTC+3)	Granat (yellow card) 45'; Lestienne 72'; Kudryashov (yellow card) 84'; Ozdoyev (yellow card) 86'	Report	Granqvist (yellow card) 12'; Laborde 17', 23'; Ramírez (yellow card) 77'	Stadium: Kazan Arena; Attendance: 11,934; Referee: Evgeny Turbin

22 July 2017 2	Krasnodar	2 – 0	Tosno	Krasnodar
20:00 MSK (UTC+3)	Granqvist (yellow card) 28'; Pereyra 58'; Joãozinho 66'	Report	Kašćelan (yellow card) 52'	Stadium: Krasnodar Stadium; Attendance: 17,250; Referee: Aleksei Eskov

31 July 2017 3	Spartak Moscow	2 – 0	Krasnodar	Moscow
19:30 MSK (UTC+3)	Promes 38' (pen.); Fernando 45+1'	Report	Gritsayenko (yellow card) 36'	Stadium: Otkrytiye Arena; Attendance: 34,208; Referee: Sergey Aleksei Gritsayenko

6 August 2017 4	Krasnodar	1 – 1	Ural Yekaterinburg	Krasnodar
20:00 MSK (UTC+3)	Granqvist 90+4' (pen.)	Report	Fidler (yellow card) 12'; Haroyan 15'	Stadium: Krasnodar Stadium; Attendance: 18,676; Referee: Alexey Nikolaev

10 August 2017 5	Akhmat Grozny	2 – 3	Krasnodar	Grozny
20:00 MSK (UTC+3)	Rodolfo (yellow card) 41'; Ismael 73'; Shvets 90'	Report	Gazinsky (yellow card) 25'; Martynovich (yellow card) 30' (goal) 53'; Mamayev (yellow card) 41'; Claesson 76'; Ignatyev 90+2'	Stadium: Akhmat-Arena; Attendance: 17,342; Referee: Sergey Ivanov

13 August 2017 6	Krasnodar	1 – 1	Amkar Perm	Krasnodar
20:00 MSK (UTC+3)	Claesson 25'	Report	Gashchenkov 76'; Kostyukov (yellow card) 83'; Nigmatullin (yellow card) 90+2'	Stadium: Krasnodar Stadium; Attendance: 17,367; Referee: Roman Galimov

20 August 2017 7	Rostov	0 – 0	Krasnodar	Rostov-on-Don
20:00 MSK (UTC+3)	Dyadyun (yellow card) 42'	Report	Martynovich (yellow card) 35'	Stadium: Olimp-2; Attendance: 12,328; Referee: Mikhail Vilkov

27 August 2017 8	Krasnodar	2 – 0	Dynamo Moscow	Krasnodar
20:00 MSK (UTC+3)	Smolov 27', 60'; Kaboré (yellow card) 40'; Petrov (yellow card) 49'; Granqvist (yellow card) 71'	Report	Rykov (yellow card) 60'; Sow (yellow card) 63'	Stadium: Krasnodar Stadium; Attendance: 23,877; Referee: Kirill Levnikov

10 September 2017 9	Ufa	0 – 1	Krasnodar	Ufa
16:30 MSK (UTC+3)	Zaseyev (yellow card) 62'	Report	Shishkin (yellow card) 40'; Smolov 75'	Stadium: Neftyanik Stadium; Attendance: 5,158; Referee: Sergey Karasev

16 September 2017 10	Anzhi Makhachkala	1 – 5	Krasnodar	Kaspiysk
19:00 MSK (UTC+3)	Poluyakhtov 77'; Markelov (yellow card) 88'	Report	Smolov 39'; Claesson 55'; Wanderson 67', 71'; Okriashvili 79'	Stadium: Anzhi Arena; Attendance: 4,550; Referee: Evgeny Turbin

24 September 2017 11	Krasnodar	0 – 2	Zenit St.Petersburg	Krasnodar
19:00 MSK (UTC+3)	Pereyra (yellow card) 45+2'	Report	Yerokhin 30'; Poloz 36'; Kranevitter (yellow card) 63'	Stadium: Krasnodar Stadium; Attendance: 33,979; Referee: Mikhail Vilkov

29 September 2017 12	Arsenal Tula	1 – 0	Krasnodar	Tula
19:30 MSK (UTC+3)	Đorđević 16'; Gorbatenko (yellow card) 44'; Bourceanu (yellow card) 45+1'	Report	Kaboré (red card) 56'; Martynovich (yellow card) 90'	Stadium: Arsenal Stadium; Attendance: 10,064; Referee: Sergey Ivanov

14 October 2017 13	Krasnodar	0 – 1	CSKA Moscow	Krasnodar
19:00 MSK (UTC+3)	Gazinsky (yellow card) 75'; Smolov (yellow card) 85'	Report	A.Berezutski 38'; Natkho (yellow card) 54'	Stadium: Krasnodar Stadium; Attendance: 32,579; Referee: Vitaly Meshkov

23 October 2017 14	Lokomotiv Moscow	2 – 0	Krasnodar	Moscow
19:30 MSK (UTC+3)	Al.Miranchuk 25'; Tarasov (yellow card) 45+2'; Fernandes 85'	Report		Stadium: RZD Arena; Attendance: 12,532; Referee: Sergey Lapochkin

29 October 2017 15	Krasnodar	4 – 1	SKA-Khabarovsk	Krasnodar
19:00 MSK (UTC+3)	Claesson 11'; Mamayev (yellow card) 19'; Smolov 41', 80' (pen.); Gritsayenko (yellow card) 59'; Wanderson 89'; Pereyra (yellow card) 90'	Report	Marković 60' (pen.); Koryan (yellow card) 79'	Stadium: Krasnodar Stadium; Attendance: 18,537; Referee: Aleksey Eskov

4 November 2017 16	Tosno	1 – 3	Krasnodar	Saint Petersburg
16:30 MSK (UTC+3)	Zabolotny 4'; Markov (yellow card) 39'; Chernov (yellow card) 90+1'	Report	Smolov 12', 38'; Gazinsky 35'	Stadium: Petrovsky Stadium; Attendance: 4,699; Referee: Vitaly Meshkov

18 November 2017 17	Krasnodar	1 – 4	Spartak Moscow	Krasnodar
16:30 MSK (UTC+3)	Shishkin (yellow card) 58'; Petrov (yellow card) 60'; Claesson 88'	Report	Luiz Adriano 8', 86'; Zé Luís 28'; Pašalić (yellow card) 78'; Promes 90'	Stadium: Krasnodar Stadium; Attendance: 33,979; Referee: Sergey Lapochkin

26 November 2017 18	Ural Yekaterinburg	0 – 1	Krasnodar	Yekaterinburg
11:30 MSK (UTC+3)	Merkulov (yellow card) 71'	Report	Smolov 34'	Stadium: SKB-Bank Arena; Referee: Vladimir Moskalyov

3 December 2017 19	Krasnodar	3 – 2	Akhmat Grozny	Krasnodar
16:30 MSK (UTC+3)	Petrov (yellow card) 27'; Smolov (yellow card) 32' (goal) 52'; Pereyra (yellow card) 58'; Granqvist (penalty missed) 58' (yellow card) 79'; Mamayev 68' (yellow card) 68'; Ramírez (yellow card) 90'; Joãozinho 90+2'	Report	Ismael (yellow card) 18' (goal) 36'; Shvets 29' (yellow card) 32'; Utsiyev (yellow card) 37'; Gudiyev (yellow card) 84'	Stadium: Krasnodar Stadium; Attendance: 19,286; Referee: Sergey Ivanov

10 December 2017 20	Amkar Perm	1 – 3	Krasnodar	Perm
14:00 MSK (UTC+3)	Forbes 57'; Bodul (yellow card) 59'	Report	Gritsayenko 13'; Ignatyev 32'; Claesson 46'; Martynovich (yellow card) 72'	Stadium: Zvezda Stadium; Attendance: 2,684; Referee: Mikhail Vilkov

3 March 2018 21	Krasnodar	3 – 1	Rostov	Krasnodar
19:00 MSK (UTC+3)	Smolov 28', 60' (pen.); Mamayev 89'	Report	Ionov 45' (pen.); Zuyev (yellow card) 90+1'	Stadium: Krasnodar Stadium; Attendance: 31,388; Referee: Sergey Karasev

10 March 2018 22	Dynamo Moscow	0 – 0	Krasnodar	Khimki
16:30 MSK (UTC+3)		Report	Granqvist (yellow card) 50'; Pereyra (yellow card) 60'	Stadium: Arena Khimki; Attendance: 5,100; Referee: Evgeny Turbin

17 March 2018 23	Krasnodar	0 – 1	Ufa	Krasnodar
16:30 MSK (UTC+3)	Laborde (yellow card) 83'	Report	Zhivoglyadov (yellow card) 56'; Fatai (yellow card) 69'; Paurević 72'; Oblyakov (yellow card) 83'	Stadium: Krasnodar Stadium; Attendance: 20,626; Referee: Vladimir Moskalyov

1 April 2018 24	Krasnodar	1 – 1	Anzhi Makhachkala	Krasnodar
19:00 MSK (UTC+3)	Claesson 33'; Kaboré (yellow card) 45+1'; Pereyra (yellow card) 82'	Report	Samardžić (yellow card) 64'; Poluyakhtov (yellow card) 71'; Danchenko 90+4'	Stadium: Krasnodar Stadium; Attendance: 20,160; Referee: Aleksey Eskov

7 April 2018 25	Zenit St.Petersburg	1 – 2	Krasnodar	Saint Petersburg
16:30 MSK (UTC+3)	Yerokhin 33'; Paredes (yellow card) 63'; Mevlja (yellow card) 85'	Report	Shatov 22'; Mamayev (yellow card) 82'; Claesson 88'; Smolov (yellow card) 90+1'	Stadium: Krestovsky Stadium; Attendance: 47,306; Referee: Roman Galimov

14 April 2018 26	Krasnodar	3 – 0	Arsenal Tula	Krasnodar
19:00 MSK (UTC+3)	Claesson 4' (yellow card) 90+2'; Petrov 23' (yellow card) 81'; Smolov (yellow card) 34'; Joãozinho (yellow card) 59'; Laborde 86'	Report	Berkhamov (yellow card) 8'; Khagush (yellow card) 57'	Stadium: Krasnodar Stadium; Attendance: 19,667; Referee: Artem Chistyakov

22 April 2018 27	CSKA Moscow	2 – 1	Krasnodar	Moscow
16:30 MSK (UTC+3)	Kuchayev (yellow card) 21'; Musa 73', 85'	Report	Mamayev (yellow card) 44'; Gazinsky 53'	Stadium: VEB Arena; Attendance: 19,774; Referee: Sergey Lapochkin

30 April 2018 28	Krasnodar	2 – 0	Lokomotiv Moscow	Krasnodar
19:00 MSK (UTC+3)	Granqvist (yellow card) 7'; Shishkin (yellow card) 28'; Smolov 67' (pen.), 68'	Report		Stadium: Krasnodar Stadium; Attendance: 34,055; Referee: Mikhail Vilkov

5 May 2018 29	SKA-Khabarovsk	0 – 1	Krasnodar	Khabarovsk
11:00 MSK (UTC+3)	Kanunnikov (penalty missed) 90+3'	Report	Claesson 45+1'	Stadium: Lenin Stadium; Attendance: 6,520; Referee: Aleksey Eskov

13 May 2018 30	Krasnodar	1 – 1	Rubin Kazan	Krasnodar
14:00 MSK (UTC+3)	Wanderson (yellow card) 43'; Pereyra (yellow card) 48'; Mamayev 56' (yellow card) 56'; Smolov (yellow card) 61'	Report	Kambolov (yellow card) 45+2'; Azmoun 87'	Stadium: Krasnodar Stadium; Attendance: 34,055; Referee: Sergey Ivanov

==== League table ====
Pos	Team	Pld	W	D	L	GF	GA	GD	Pts	Qualification or relegation
2	CSKA Moscow	30	17	7	6	49	23	+26	58	Qualification for the Champions League group stage
3	Spartak Moscow	30	16	8	6	51	32	+19	56	Qualification for the Champions League third qualifying round
4	Krasnodar	30	16	6	8	46	30	+16	54	Qualification for the Europa League group stage (Note: Tosno qualified for the Europa League group stage by winning the 2017–18 Russian Cup. However, since they failed to obtain a UEFA licence, the spot awarded to the cup winners was passed to fourth-placed team, the spot awarded to the fourth-placed team was passed to fifth-placed team, and the spot awarded to the fifth-placed team was passed to sixth-placed team.)
5	Zenit Saint Petersburg	30	14	11	5	46	21	+25	53	Qualification for the Europa League third qualifying round
6	Ufa	30	11	10	9	34	30	+4	43	Qualification for the Europa League second qualifying round

Updated to match(es) played on 13 May 2018. Source: Russian Premier League, Soccerway
Rules for classification: 1) Points; 2) Head-to-head points; 3) Head-to-head matches won; 4) Head-to-head goal difference; 5) Head-to-head goals scored; 6) Head-to-head away goals; 7) Matches won; 8) Goal difference; 9) Goals scored; 10) Away goals scored.

=== Russian Cup ===
20 September 2017 Round of 32	Tom Tomsk	2 – 1	Krasnodar	Tomsk
15:00 MSK (UTC+3)	Deobald 24'; Sobolev (yellow card) 31' (goal) 45'; Girdvainis (yellow card) 31'; Sasin (yellow card) 71'; Kudryashov (yellow card) 86'	Report	Mamayev 32' (pen.); Kaboré (yellow card) 62'; Okriashvili (yellow card) 87'	Stadium: Trud Stadium; Attendance: 2,300; Referee: Igor Fedotov

=== UEFA Europa League ===
==== Qualifying rounds ====
27 July 2017 Third qualifying round 1st leg	Krasnodar (Russia)	2 – 1	(Denmark) Lyngby	Krasnodar, Russia
20:00 MSK (UTC+3)	Claesson 67'; Yanbayev (yellow card) 73'; Suleymanov 90+3'	Report	Brandrup (yellow card) 34'; Kjær 64'	Stadium: Krasnodar Stadium; Attendance: 20,239; Referee: Christos Nicolaides (Cyprus)

3 August 2017 Third qualifying round 2nd leg	Lyngby (Denmark)	1 – 3 (2 – 5 agg.)	(Russia) Krasnodar	Søborg, (Note: Lyngby will play their third qualifying round home match at Gladsaxe Stadium, Søborg, instead of their regular stadium Lyngby Stadium, Kongens Lyngby.) Denmark
20:45 MSK (UTC+3)	Kjær (yellow card) 7'; Rygaard Jensen 28' (yellow card) 44'	Report	Pereyra 9', 22'; Mamayev 89' (pen.)	Stadium: Gladsaxe Stadium; Attendance: 2,887; Referee: Sebastian Colțescu (Romania)

17 August 2017 Playoff round 1st Leg	Krasnodar (Russia)	3 – 2	(Serbia) Red Star Belgrade	Krasnodar, Russia
20:00 MSK (UTC+3)	Ignatyev 20'; Ramírez (yellow card) 29'; Claesson 46'; Petrov 66'; Smolov (yellow card) 77'; Ristić (yellow card) 88'; Suleymanov (yellow card) 90+2'	Report	Le Tallec (yellow card) 55'; Srnić 57'; Pešić 71'; Savić (yellow card) 77'	Stadium: Krasnodar Stadium; Attendance: 24,587; Referee: Gediminas Mažeika (Lithuania)

24 August 2017 Playoff round 2nd Leg	Red Star Belgrade (Serbia)	2 – 1 (a 4 – 4 agg.)	(Russia) Krasnodar	Belgrade, Serbia
22:00 MSK (UTC+3)	Radonjić 7' (yellow card) 8'; Donald (yellow card) 40'; Kanga 46' (yellow card) 47'; Borjan (yellow card) 83'; Savić (yellow card) 90+3'; Stojković (yellow card) 90+3'; Boakye (yellow card) 90+4'	Report	Kaboré (yellow card) 11'; Ramírez (yellow card) 52'; Granqvist 82' (pen.) (yellow card) 90'	Stadium: Red Star Stadium; Attendance: 50,720; Referee: Tobias Stieler (Germany)

== Squad statistics ==
As of match played 13 May 2018

=== Appearances and goals ===
No.	Pos	Nat	Player	Total		Premier League		Russian Cup		Europa League	
No.	Pos	Nat	Player	Apps	Goals	Apps	Goals	Apps	Goals	Apps	Goals
1	GK	(Russia) RUS	Stanislav Kritsyuk	4	0	4	0	0	0	0	0
4	DF	(Belarus) BLR	Alyaksandr Martynovich	27	1	22	1	1	0	4	0
6	DF	(Sweden) SWE	Andreas Granqvist	33	2	29	1	0	0	4	1
7	FW	(Brazil) BRA	Wanderson	31	3	12+14	3	1	0	4	0
8	MF	(Russia) RUS	Yury Gazinsky	30	2	27+1	2	0	0	1+1	0
9	FW	(Romania) ROU	Andrei Ivan	9	0	0+7	0	0+1	0	0+1	0
10	FW	(Russia) RUS	Fyodor Smolov	24	14	21+1	14	0	0	1+1	0
12	DF	(Ecuador) ECU	Cristian Ramírez	25	0	18+2	0	1	0	3+1	0
13	DF	(Russia) RUS	Ihor Kalinin	2	0	1+1	0	0	0	0	0
16	MF	(Sweden) SWE	Viktor Claesson	34	12	28+2	10	0	0	4	2
17	MF	(Russia) RUS	Pavel Mamayev	23	5	15+4	3	1	1	3	1
18	MF	(Russia) RUS	Oleg Shatov	6	1	6	1	0	0	0	0
21	MF	(Colombia) COL	Ricardo Laborde	9	3	1+7	3	1	0	0	0
22	MF	(Brazil) BRA	Joãozinho	26	2	7+17	2	1	0	1	0
26	DF	(Russia) RUS	Aleksei Gritsayenko	11	1	10	1	1	0	0	0
30	DF	(Russia) RUS	Roman Shishkin	22	0	13+7	0	0	0	2	0
33	MF	(Uruguay) URU	Mauricio Pereyra	30	3	25+2	1	0	0	2+1	2
39	GK	(Russia) RUS	Matvei Safonov	1	0	1	0	0	0	0	0
55	DF	(Russia) RUS	Renat Yanbayev	3	0	1	0	1	0	1	0
66	GK	(Russia) RUS	Denis Adamov	1	0	0	0	1	0	0	0
70	MF	(Georgia (country)) GEO	Tornike Okriashvili	4	1	0+3	1	0+1	0	0	0
77	MF	(Burkina Faso) BFA	Charles Kaboré	22	0	18+1	0	1	0	2	0
85	FW	(Russia) RUS	Ivan Ignatyev	6	3	4	2	0	0	2	1
88	GK	(Russia) RUS	Andrei Sinitsyn	29	0	25	0	0	0	4	0
93	FW	(Russia) RUS	Magomed-Shapi Suleymanov	7	1	0+4	0	0	0	0+3	1
98	MF	(Russia) RUS	Sergei Petrov	30	2	28	1	0	0	2	1
Players away from the club on loan:
11	MF	(Russia) RUS	Vyacheslav Podberyozkin	11	0	9+1	0	0+1	0	0	0
15	MF	(Russia) RUS	Ilya Zhigulyov	12	0	2+6	0	0	0	0+4	0
27	MF	(Serbia) SRB	Mihailo Ristić	8	0	3+1	0	1	0	3	0
Players who left Krasnodar during the season:

=== Goal scorers ===
Place	Position	Nation	Number	Name	Premier League	Russian Cup	Europa League	Total
1	FW	(Russia)	10	Fyodor Smolov	14	0	0	14
2	MF	(Sweden)	16	Viktor Claesson	10	0	2	12
3	MF	(Russia)	17	Pavel Mamayev	3	1	1	5
4	MF	(Brazil)	7	Wanderson	3	0	0	3
4	MF	(Colombia)	21	Ricardo Laborde	3	0	0	3
4	FW	(Russia)	85	Ivan Ignatyev	2	0	1	3
4	MF	(Uruguay)	33	Mauricio Pereyra	1	0	2	3
8	MF	(Brazil)	22	Joãozinho	2	0	0	2
8	MF	(Russia)	8	Yury Gazinsky	2	0	0	2
8	DF	(Sweden)	6	Andreas Granqvist	1	0	1	2
8	MF	(Russia)	98	Sergei Petrov	1	0	1	2
12	DF	(Belarus)	4	Alyaksandr Martynovich	1	0	0	1
12	MF	(Georgia (country))	70	Tornike Okriashvili	1	0	0	1
12	DF	(Russia)	26	Aleksei Gritsayenko	1	0	0	1
12	MF	(Russia)	18	Oleg Shatov	1	0	0	1
12	FW	(Russia)	93	Magomed-Shapi Suleymanov	0	0	1	1
				TOTALS	46	1	9	56

=== Disciplinary record ===
Number	Nation	Position	Name	Premier League		Russian Cup		Europa League		Total	
Number	Nation	Position	Name	Yellow card	Red card	Yellow card	Red card	Yellow card	Red card	Yellow card	Red card
4	(Belarus)	DF	Alyaksandr Martynovich	4	0	0	0	0	0	4	0
6	(Sweden)	DF	Andreas Granqvist	6	0	0	0	1	0	7	0
7	(Brazil)	FW	Wanderson	1	0	0	0	0	0	1	0
8	(Russia)	MF	Yury Gazinsky	2	0	0	0	0	0	2	0
10	(Russia)	FW	Fyodor Smolov	5	0	0	0	1	0	6	0
12	(Ecuador)	DF	Cristian Ramírez	2	0	0	0	2	0	4	0
16	(Sweden)	MF	Viktor Claesson	1	0	0	0	0	0	1	0
17	(Russia)	MF	Pavel Mamayev	6	0	0	0	0	0	6	0
21	(Colombia)	MF	Ricardo Laborde	1	0	0	0	0	0	1	0
22	(Brazil)	MF	Joãozinho	1	0	0	0	0	0	1	0
26	(Russia)	DF	Aleksei Gritsayenko	2	0	0	0	0	0	2	0
30	(Russia)	DF	Roman Shishkin	2	0	0	0	1	0	3	0
33	(Uruguay)	MF	Mauricio Pereyra	6	0	0	0	0	0	6	0
55	(Russia)	DF	Renat Yanbayev	0	0	0	0	1	0	1	0
70	(Georgia (country))	MF	Tornike Okriashvili	0	0	1	0	0	0	1	0
77	(Burkina Faso)	MF	Charles Kaboré	2	1	1	0	1	0	4	1
93	(Russia)	FW	Magomed-Shapi Suleymanov	0	0	0	0	1	0	1	0
98	(Russia)	MF	Sergei Petrov	4	0	0	0	0	0	4	0
Players away on loan:
27	(Serbia)	MF	Mihailo Ristić	0	0	0	0	1	0	1	0
			TOTALS	46	1	2	0	8	0	56	1
