= Ilya Vorotnikov =

Ilya Vorotnikov may refer to:

- Ilya Vorotnikov (footballer, born 1986)
- Ilya Vorotnikov (footballer, born 2001)
