= Vorotnikov =

Vorotnikov (Russian: Воротников) is a Russian masculine surname, its feminine counterpart is Vorotnikova. Notable people with the surname include:

- Ilya Vorotnikov (footballer, born 1986), Kazakh football player
- Ilya Vorotnikov (footballer, born 2001)
- Vitaly Vorotnikov (1926–2012), Soviet politician and diplomat
