= Nikita Sergeyev (footballer, born 1999) =

Russian footballer

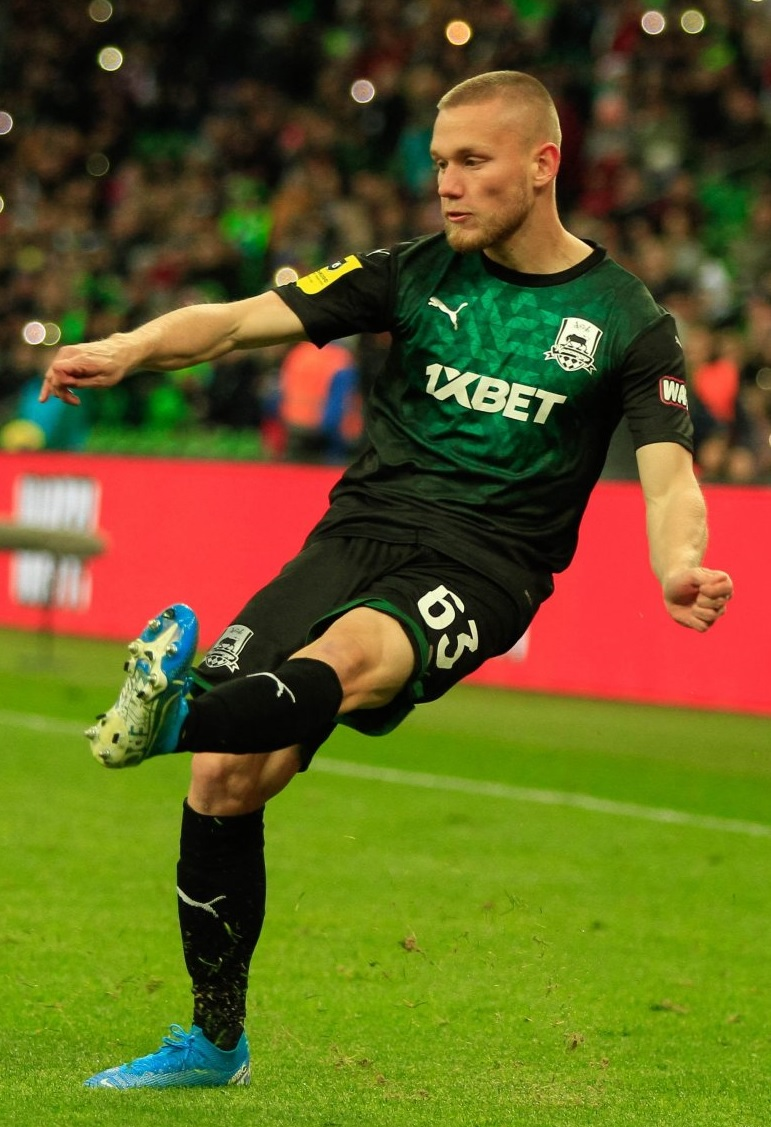
- Sergeyev with Krasnodar in 2020

Personal information
- Full name: Nikita Vyacheslavovich Sergeyev
- Date of birth: 17 October 1999 (age 27)
- Place of birth: Ruzayevka, Russia
- Height: 1.76 m (5 ft 9 in)
- Position: Forward

Team information
- Current team: Murom
- Number: 17

Youth career
- 2016–2017: Krasnodar

Senior career*
Years	Team	Apps	(Gls)
2017–2022	Krasnodar-2	81	(10)
2018–2021	Krasnodar-3	5	(0)
2018–2022	Krasnodar	5	(0)
2023	Spartak Kostroma	5	(1)
2023–2024	Novosibirsk	5	(0)
2024–2025	Druzhba Maykop	42	(6)
2025–2026	Dynamo St. Petersburg	8	(1)
2026–	Murom	3	(0)

International career^{‡}
2016–2017	Russia U-18	11	(3)
2017	Russia U-19	2	(0)
- * Club domestic league appearances and goals as of 1 November 2026 ‡ National team caps and goals as of 11 November 2017

Nikita Vyacheslavovich Sergeyev (Russian: Никита Вячеславович Сергеев; born 17 October 1999) is a Russian football player who plays as a left winger for Murom.

== Club career ==
He made his debut in the Russian Professional Football League for Krasnodar-2 on 3 October 2017 in a game against Kuban-2 Krasnodar. He made his Russian Football National League debut for Krasnodar-2 on 17 July 2018 in a game against Sibir Novosibirsk.

He made his Russian Premier League debut for Krasnodar on 1 March 2020 in a game against Ufa. He substituted Wanderson in the 88th minute.

== Career statistics ==
As of 21 May 2022

Club	Season	League			Cup		Continental		Other		Total	
Club	Season	Division	Apps	Goals	Apps	Goals	Apps	Goals	Apps	Goals	Apps	Goals
Krasnodar-2	2017–18	PFL	3	0	–		–		–		3	0
Krasnodar-2	2018–19	FNL	20	3	–		–		5 (Note: Appearances in the FNL Cup)	0	25	3
Krasnodar-2	2019–20	FNL	24	4	–		–		–		24	4
Krasnodar-2	2020–21	FNL	19	2	–		–		–		19	2
Krasnodar-2	2021–22	FNL	15	1	–		–		–		15	1
Krasnodar-2	Total		81	10	0	0	0	0	5	0	86	10
Krasnodar-3	2018–19	PFL	2	0	–		–		–		2	0
Krasnodar-3	2020–21	PFL	3	0	–		–		–		3	0
Krasnodar-3	Total		5	0	0	0	0	0	0	0	5	0
Krasnodar	2018–19	RPL	0	0	0	0	0	0	–		0	0
Krasnodar	2019–20	RPL	4	0	0	0	0	0	–		4	0
Krasnodar	2021–22	RPL	1	0	0	0	–		–		1	0
Krasnodar	Total		5	0	0	0	0	0	0	0	5	0
Career total			91	10	0	0	0	0	5	0	96	10
