= Ari (footballer, born 1985) =

Russian footballer

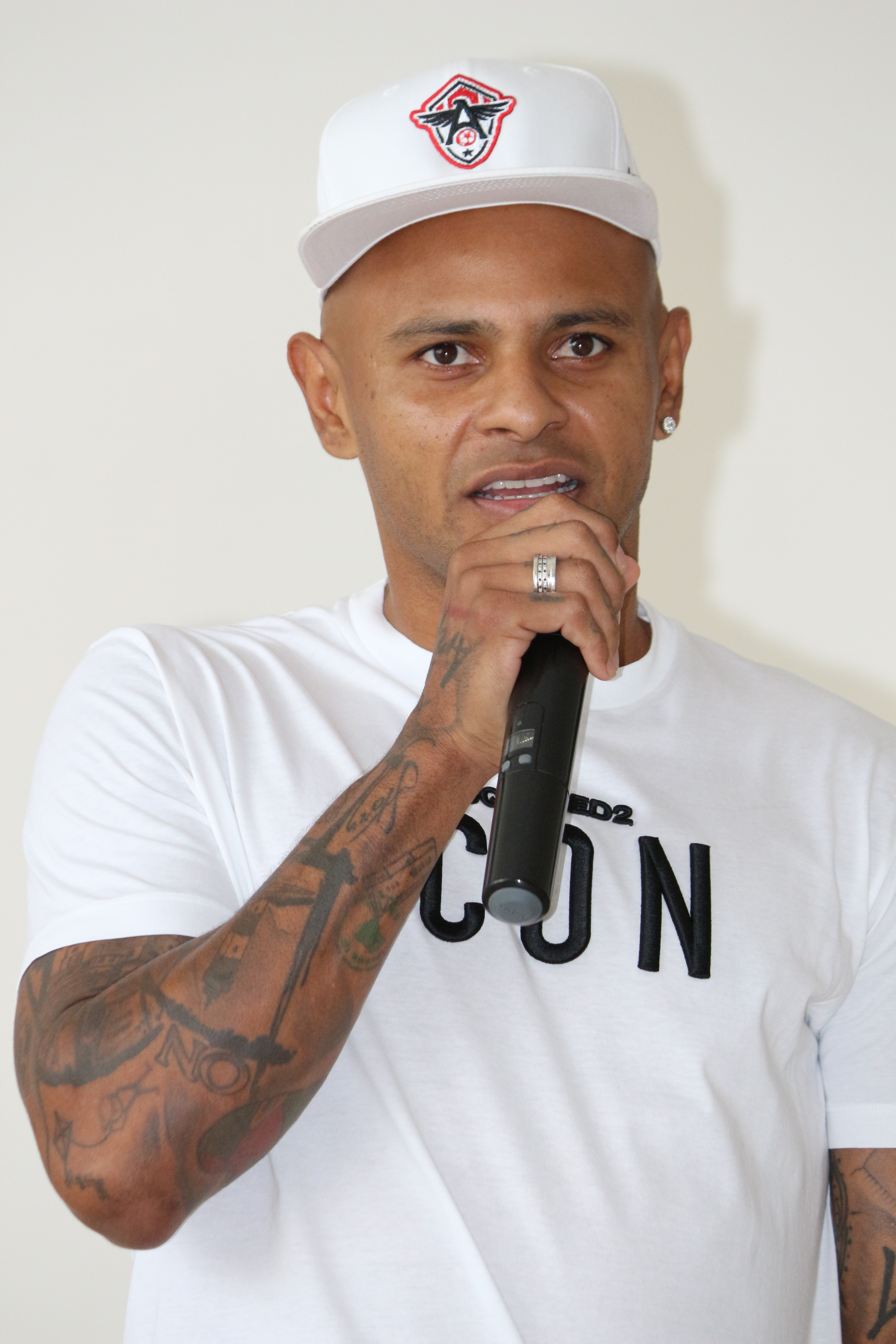
- Ari in 2018

Personal information
- Full name: Ariclenes da Silva Ferreira
- Date of birth: 11 December 1985 (age 40)
- Place of birth: Fortaleza, Brazil
- Height: 1.80 m (5 ft 11 in)
- Position: Striker

Youth career
- Estácio de Sá
- –2002: Calouros do Ar

Senior career*
Years	Team	Apps	(Gls)
2003–2004	Avaí FC		
2004–2005	Fortaleza	3	(0)
2006–2007	Kalmar FF	35	(18)
2007–2009	AZ Alkmaar	55	(18)
2010–2013	Spartak Moscow	89	(21)
2013–2021	Krasnodar	119	(38)
2017–2018	→ Lokomotiv Moscow (loan)	17	(7)
2022–2024	Atlético Cearense	62	(12)

International career
2018	Russia	2	(0)

Managerial career
- 2022–2024: Atlético Cearense (president)
- 2024–2025: Torpedo Moscow (sports director)
- * Club domestic league appearances and goals

Ariclenes da Silva Ferreira (Russian: Арикленес да Силва Феррейра; born 11 December 1985), commonly known as Ari (Brazilian Portuguese: [aˈɾi]), is a professional football official and a former striker. Born in Brazil, he played for the Russia national team.

He started his professional career in 2005 with his hometown club Fortaleza, and signed for Swedish club Kalmar one year later. After two and a half seasons in AZ Alkmaar, he played in the Russian Premier League for Spartak Moscow, Krasnodar, and Lokomotiv Moscow.

== Club career ==
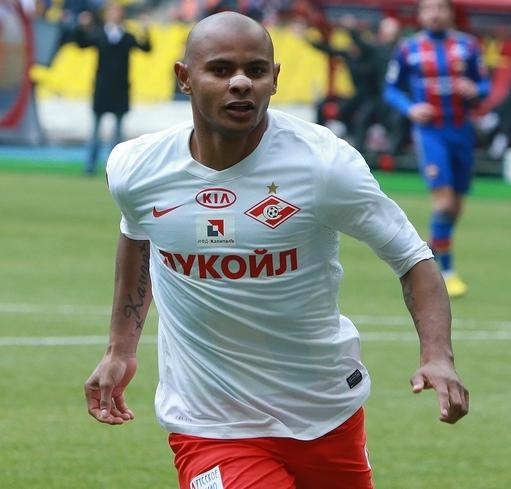
With Spartak Moscow in 2013

Having joined Allsvenskan team Kalmar FF in spring 2006, Ari was the top scorer in the Allsvenskan 2006 with 15 goals, amassing one goal more than compatriot Afonso Alves had the previous season.

On 28 May 2007, Ari signed a five-year contract with AZ for an undisclosed fee. At Alkmaar he struggled to force his way into the first team on a regular basis, but he did win the 2008–09 Eredivisie.

In January 2010 Ari was transferred to Spartak Moscow for €3 million. Despite a successful career at the club, he departed amidst a conflict with management.

On 19 August 2013, he signed a three-year contract with FC Krasnodar. He left Krasnodar on 17 May 2021, after being a key player for eight seasons.

== International career ==
In 2016, after Kosovo's membership in UEFA and FIFA, Ari was offered a chance to play for the Kosovo national team by their coach, Albert Bunjaki. Coincidentally, he was also an assistant coach at Kalmar, Ari's former club. The offer was rejected by the Football Federation of Kosovo's president, Fadil Vokrri.

In July 2017, Ari confirmed his desire to obtain Russian citizenship and represent the Russia national team at the 2018 World Cup. However, the citizenship process was delayed and he received a Russian passport in July 2018. On 12 November 2018, Ari was called up to the Russian squad for the first time for the friendly matches against Germany and Sweden.

== Post-playing career ==
On 3 December 2024, Ari was appointed sporting director of Torpedo Moscow.

== Personal life ==
As of now, Ari is one of three Brazilians who played for the Russian national team, the others being Guilherme Marinato and Mário Fernandes. He and Guilherme can speak Russian.

After Ari was called up to the Russian national team, Pavel Pogrebnyak said: "I don't see the point of this. I do not understand at all why Ari received a Russian passport. It is laughable when a black player represents the Russian national side". Accused of racism, an investigation was subsequently launched, after which Pogrebnyak was fined and put on probation.

== Career statistics ==
As of match played 11 March 2022

Appearances and goals by club, season and competition
Club	Season	League	League		Cup		Continental		Other		Total	
Club	Season	League	App	Goals	App	Goals	App	Goals	App	Goals	App	Goals
Fortaleza	2006	Campeonato Brasileiro	3	0	?	?	?	?	?	?	3+	0+
Kalmar	2006	Allsvenskan	23	15	?	?	3	3	—		26+	18+
Kalmar	2007	Allsvenskan	12	3	?	?	?	?	—		12+	3+
Kalmar	Total		35	18	?	?	3+	3+	0	0	38+	21+
AZ	2007–08	Eredivisie	29	9	0	0	3	1	—		32	10
AZ	2008–09	Eredivisie	20	9	1	0	0	0	—		21	9
AZ	2009–10	Eredivisie	6	0	3	0	1	0	—		10	0
AZ	Total		55	18	4	0	4	1	0	0	63	19
Spartak Moscow	2010	Russian Premier League	24	7	0	0	4	2	—		28	9
Spartak Moscow	2011–12	Russian Premier League	38	10	3	1	7	3	—		48	14
Spartak Moscow	2012–13	Russian Premier League	27	4	2	0	8	2	—		37	6
Spartak Moscow	Total		89	21	5	1	19	7	0	0	113	29
Krasnodar	2013–14	Russian Premier League	18	6	3	1	—		—		21	7
Krasnodar	2014–15	Russian Premier League	26	7	2	1	10	6	—		38	14
Krasnodar	2015–16	Russian Premier League	21	5	4	0	11	1	—		36	6
Krasnodar	2016–17	Russian Premier League	11	4	2	1	6	2	—		19	7
Krasnodar	2017–18	Russian Premier League	0	0	0	0	0	0	—		0	0
Krasnodar	2018–19	Russian Premier League	16	8	0	0	6	2	—		22	10
Krasnodar	2019–20	Russian Premier League	18	6	0	0	5	2	—		23	8
Krasnodar	2020–21	Russian Premier League	9	2	1	0	3	0	—		13	2
Krasnodar	Total		119	38	12	3	39	12	0	0	172	54
Lokomotiv Moscow (loan)	2016–17	Russian Premier League	9	6	3	0	—		—		12	6
Lokomotiv Moscow (loan)	2017–18	Russian Premier League	8	1	0	0	2	0	1 (Note: One appearance in the Russian Super Cup)	0	11	1
Lokomotiv Moscow (loan)	Total		17	7	3	0	2	0	1	0	23	7
Atlético Cearense	2022	Série C	0	0	0	0	0	0	4 (Note: Appearances/goals in the Campeonato Cearense)	7	4	7
Total			318	102	24+	4+	67+	23+	5	7	416	137

== Honours ==
Fortaleza

- Campeonato Cearense: 2005

Kalmar

- Svenska Cupen: 2007

AZ Alkmaar

- Eredivisie: 2008–09
- Johan Cruijff Shield: 2009

Krasnodar

- Russian Cup: runner-up 2013–14

Lokomotiv Moscow

- Russian Premier League: 2017–18
- Russian Cup: 2016–17

Individual

- Allsvenskan Top Scorer: 2006 (15 goals)
