= Magomed-Shapi Suleymanov =

Dagestani footballer (born 1999)

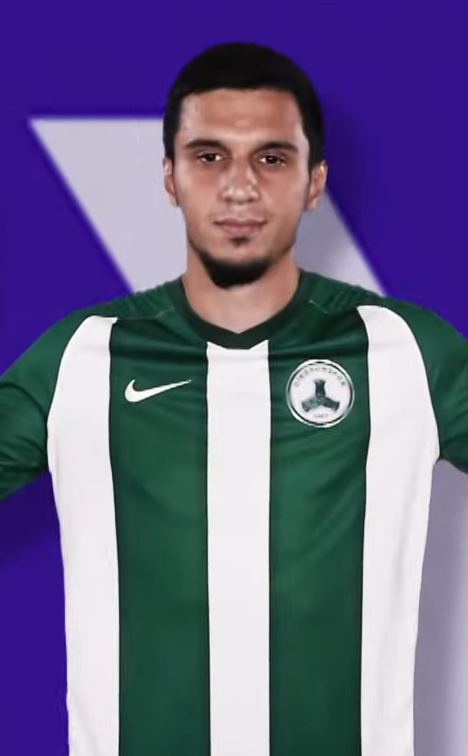
- Suleymanov in 2021

Personal information
- Full name: Magomed-Shapi Kamilyevich Suleymanov
- Date of birth: 16 December 1999 (age 26)
- Place of birth: Makhachkala, Dagestan, Russia
- Height: 1.71 m (5 ft 7 in)
- Position: Winger

Team information
- Current team: Sporting Kansas City
- Number: 93

Youth career
- 2006–2013: RSDYuShOR-2 Makhachkala
- 2013–2017: Krasnodar

Senior career*
Years	Team	Apps	(Gls)
2017–2021	Krasnodar-2	21	(3)
2017–2024	Krasnodar	87	(16)
2021–2022	→ Giresunspor (loan)	31	(3)
2022–2023	→ Hapoel Be'er Sheva (loan)	29	(5)
2023–2024	→ Aris (loan)	31	(5)
2024–2025	Aris	12	(1)
2025–	Sporting Kansas City	58	(3)

International career
2014–2015	Russia U16	13	(6)
2015–2016	Russia U17	9	(2)
2016–2017	Russia U18	12	(0)
2017	Russia U19	5	(2)
2019–2020	Russia U21	10	(3)
- * Club domestic league appearances and goals as of 23:26, 11 November 2026 (UTC)

Magomed-Shapi Kamilyevich Suleymanov (Russian: Магомед-Шапи Камильевич Сулейманов; born 16 December 1999), also known as Shapi Suleymanov, is a Dagestani professional footballer who plays as a winger for Major League Soccer club Sporting Kansas City.

== Career ==
Suleymanov made his debut in the Russian Professional Football League for FC Krasnodar-2 on 12 March 2017 in a game against FC Angusht Nazran.

He made his debut in the Russian Premier League for FC Krasnodar on 16 July 2017 in a game against FC Rubin Kazan.

In his second main squad appearance on 27 July 2017 in a 2017–18 UEFA Europa League third qualifying round game against Lyngby he scored the winning goal in the 93rd minute, giving his team a 2–1 victory. He thus became the youngest Russian player ever to score in UEFA's club competitions (at the age of 17 years 7 months and 11 days), beating the mark set by Sergey Rodionov in 1980.

In his first appearance of the 2018–19 season on 26 August 2018 he scored his first Russian Premier League goal, an 88th-minute equalizer in a 1–1 away draw against FC Orenburg. In the next game on 1 September 2018, he scored another goal in added time, giving Krasnodar a 2–1 victory over the reigning champions FC Lokomotiv Moscow. He scored again, for the third time in four games on 24 September 2018 against FC Krylia Sovetov Samara.

On 21 February 2019, he scored a late free-kick goal that helped Krasnodar eliminate Bayer Leverkusen in the Europa League Round of 32 on the away-goals rule. On 14 March 2019, in the Round of 16 return leg, he scored a late goal once again, this time against Valencia, that would have qualified Krasnodar for the quarterfinal, but Valencia equalized with 30 seconds left in injury time and Krasnodar was eliminated. On 31 March 2019, he had his first Russian Premier League multi-goal game, scoring twice against his hometown club FC Anzhi Makhachkala in a 5–0 victory.

On 13 August 2019, with Krasnodar making its debut appearance in the Champions League qualifiers, he scored twice in a 3–2 away victory over FC Porto to help his club overcome the first leg 0–1 home loss and advance to the play-off round.

On 8 September 2021, Krasnodar announced his loan to Turkish club Giresunspor for the 2021–22 season.

He returned to Krasnodar in June 2022.

On 17 August 2022, Suleymanov joined Hapoel Be'er Sheva in Israel on a season-long loan with an option to buy.

On 3 July 2024, Greek club Aris where Suleymanov played on loan in the 2023–24 season, announced his permanent transfer to Aris.

On 3 February 2025, Major League Soccer club Sporting Kansas City signed Suleymanov to a two-year contract through 2027, with a club option for 2028.

== Career statistics ==
=== Club ===
As of match played 13 November 2022

Appearances and goals by club, season and competition
Club	Season	League			Cup		Continental		Total	
Club	Season	Division	Apps	Goals	Apps	Goals	Apps	Goals	Apps	Goals
Krasnodar-2	2016–17	Russian Professional Football League	1	0	—		—		1	0
Krasnodar-2	2017–18	Russian Professional Football League	1	0	—		—		1	0
Krasnodar-2	2018–19	Russian Football National League	15	3	—		—		15	3
Krasnodar-2	2020–21	Russian Football National League	4	0	—		—		4	0
Krasnodar-2	Total		21	3	0	0	0	0	21	3
Krasnodar	2017–18	Russian Premier League	4	0	0	0	3 (Note: Appearances in the UEFA Europa League)	1	7	1
Krasnodar	2018–19	Russian Premier League	20	8	3	0	8	3	31	11
Krasnodar	2019–20	Russian Premier League	27	4	1	0	10 (Note: Four appearances and two goals in the UEFA Champions League, six appearances in the UEFA Europa League)	2	38	6
Krasnodar	2020–21	Russian Premier League	27	4	1	0	10 (Note: Eight appearances and one goal in the UEFA Champions League, two appearances in the UEFA Europa League)	1	38	5
Krasnodar	2021–22	Russian Premier League	4	0	0	0	—		4	0
Krasnodar	2022–23	Russian Premier League	4	0	—		—		4	0
Krasnodar	Total		86	16	5	0	31	7	122	23
Giresunspor (loan)	2021–22	Süper Lig	31	3	1	0	—		32	3
Hapoel Be'er Sheva (loan)	2022–23	Israeli Premier League	29	5	1	0	5 (Note: Appearances in the UEFA Europa Conference League)	0	35	5
Career total			167	27	7	0	36	7	210	34

== Honours ==
Individual

- UEFA Youth League top assists: 2017–18
