= Roman Kurazhov =

Russian footballer

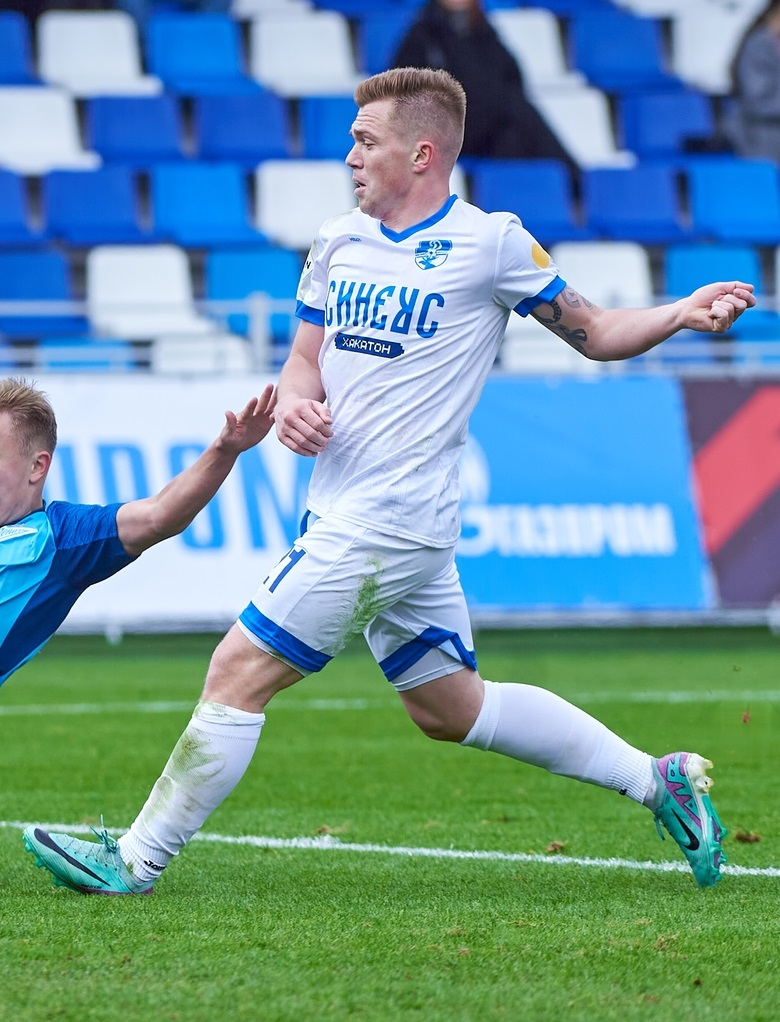
- Kurazhov with Dynamo Vologda in 2024

Personal information
- Full name: Roman Vladimirovich Kurazhov
- Date of birth: 28 July 1999 (age 27)
- Place of birth: Sokol, Russia
- Height: 1.69 m (5 ft 7 in)
- Positions: Defender; midfielder

Team information
- Current team: Sukhona Sokol (amateur)

Youth career
- –2014: DYuSSh Sukhona Sokol
- 2015–2016: Krasnodar

Senior career*
Years	Team	Apps	(Gls)
2017–2020	Krasnodar-2	7	(0)
2018	→ Krasnodar-3	15	(3)
2019	→ Sokol Saratov (loan)	9	(0)
2019–2020	→ KAMAZ (loan)	15	(0)
2020	Dynamo Stavropol	9	(1)
2021	Krasny	11	(3)
2021	Smolensk	0	(0)
2021	Rubin Yalta (KFS)		
2022	Saturn Ramenskoye	8	(0)
2022–2024	Dynamo Vologda	47	(2)
2024–	Sukhona Sokol (amateur)		

International career^{‡}
2014	Russia U-15	2	(0)
2014–2015	Russia U-16	8	(1)
- * Club domestic league appearances and goals as of 9 December 2024 ‡ National team caps and goals as of 5 June 2015

Roman Vladimirovich Kurazhov (Russian: Роман Владимирович Куражов; born 28 July 1999) is a Russian football player. He plays for amateur club Sukhona Sokol.

== Club career ==
He made his debut in the Russian Professional Football League for FC Krasnodar-2 on 10 April 2017 in a game against FC Spartak Vladikavkaz. He made his Russian Football National League debut for Krasnodar-2 on 24 October 2018 in a game against FC Nizhny Novgorod.
