= Andrei Tekuchyov =

Russian footballer

Personal information
- Full name: Andrei Olegovich Tekuchyov
- Date of birth: 5 July 1999 (age 27)
- Place of birth: Nevinnomyssk, Russia
- Height: 1.67 m (5 ft 6 in)
- Position: Midfielder

Youth career
- 2016–2019: Krasnodar

Senior career*
Years	Team	Apps	(Gls)
2016–2021	Krasnodar	0	(0)
2017–2019	→ Krasnodar-2	25	(1)
2018–2019	→ Krasnodar-3	14	(1)
2019–2020	→ Chayka (loan)	24	(4)
2020	→ Tom Tomsk (loan)	10	(0)
2020–2021	→ Krasnodar-2	15	(0)
2020–2021	→ Krasnodar-3	2	(0)
2021–2022	Shinnik Yaroslavl	5	(0)
2022–2023	Mashuk-KMV	6	(0)
2023	Rubin-2 Kazan	0	(0)
2023	Kolomna	13	(0)
2024	Zenit Penza	14	(0)
- * Club domestic league appearances and goals as of 4 August 2024

Andrei Olegovich Tekuchyov (Russian: Андрей Олегович Текучёв; born 5 July 1999) is a Russian football player.

== Club career ==
He made his debut in the Russian Professional Football League for Krasnodar-2 on 26 March 2017 in a game against Dynamo Stavropol. He made his Russian Football National League debut for Krasnodar-2 on 23 September 2018 in a game against Fakel Voronezh.

On 19 June 2019, he joined Chayka Peschanokopskoye on loan.
