= Wanderson (footballer, born 7 October 1994) =

Brazilian footballer

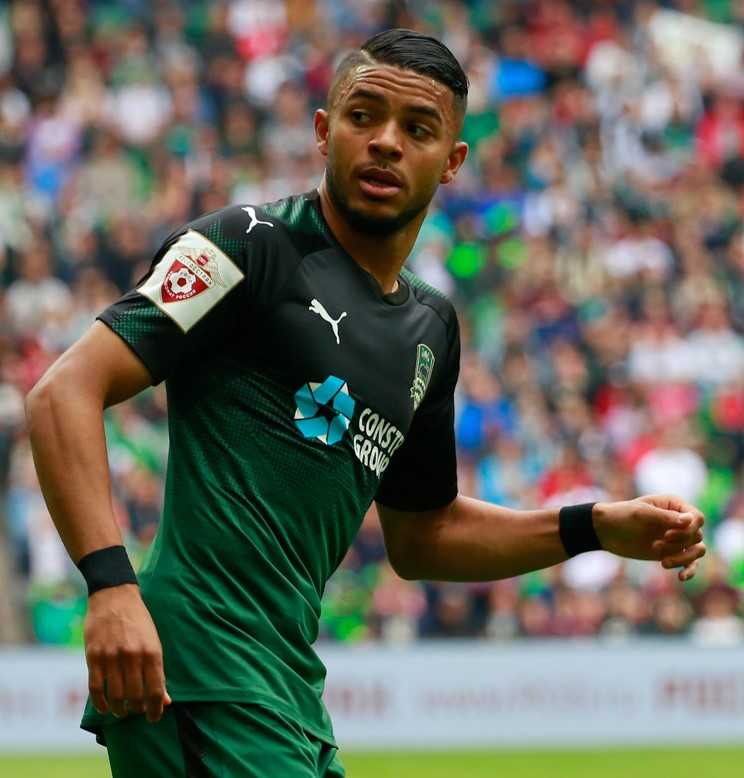
- Wanderson with FC Krasnodar in 2018.

Personal information
- Full name: Wanderson Maciel Sousa Campos
- Date of birth: 7 October 1994 (age 32)
- Place of birth: Liège, Belgium
- Height: 1.76 m (5 ft 9 in)
- Position: Winger

Team information
- Current team: Cruzeiro
- Number: 94

Youth career
- 2002–2009: Ajax
- 2009–2012: Beerschot

Senior career*
Years	Team	Apps	(Gls)
2012–2013	Beerschot	6	(0)
2013–2015	Lierse	55	(4)
2015	Getafe B	5	(2)
2015–2016	Getafe	20	(0)
2016–2017	Red Bull Salzburg	20	(3)
2017–2022	FC Krasnodar	98	(14)
2022	→ Internacional (loan)	26	(6)
2023–2025	Internacional	90	(14)
2025–	Cruzeiro	44	(2)
- * Club domestic league appearances and goals as of 9 April 2026

Wanderson Maciel Sousa Campos (born 7 October 1994), known as Wanderson, is a Belgian professional footballer who plays for Brazilian club Cruzeiro as a left winger.

== Club career ==
=== Early career ===
Born in Liège, Wanderson joined AFC Ajax's youth setup in 2002, aged eight, as his father was playing for the club. In 2009, again following his father, he joined Beerschot AC. After progressing through the latter's youth setup, he made his first team and Pro League debut on 31 October 2012, starting in a 1–3 away loss against Cercle Brugge.

Wanderson appeared in six league matches for Beerschot before the club was relegated and subsequently declared bankruptcy. On 20 June 2013 he signed a two-year deal with Lierse SK, after impressing on a trial.

Wanderson made his Lierse debut on 27 July 2013, in a 1–2 home loss against Zulte-Waregem, and scored his first professional goal on 23 November, netting the first in a 4–2 win at Cercle Brugge. In October 2014 he was linked as a target to the likes of Celtic, Swansea City, West Ham United, Queens Park Rangers, Sunderland and Aston Villa, but none of them made any formal bids for the player.

Wanderson played for the Belgium national under-16 football team.

=== Getafe ===
In 2015, after Lierse's relegation, Wanderson failed to appear in the club's pre-season; despite Lierse alleging he was under contract, his father alleged he was a free agent after receiving a FIFA clearance. He subsequently went on a trial at Getafe CF in July, signing a contract with the club.

Despite being assigned to the reserves in Segunda División B, Wanderson was called up for the pre-season with the main squad, also scoring a goal against Port Vale. He made his La Liga debut on 30 August 2015, coming on as a second-half substitute for Emi Buendía in a 1–2 home loss against Granada CF.

=== Red Bull Salzburg ===
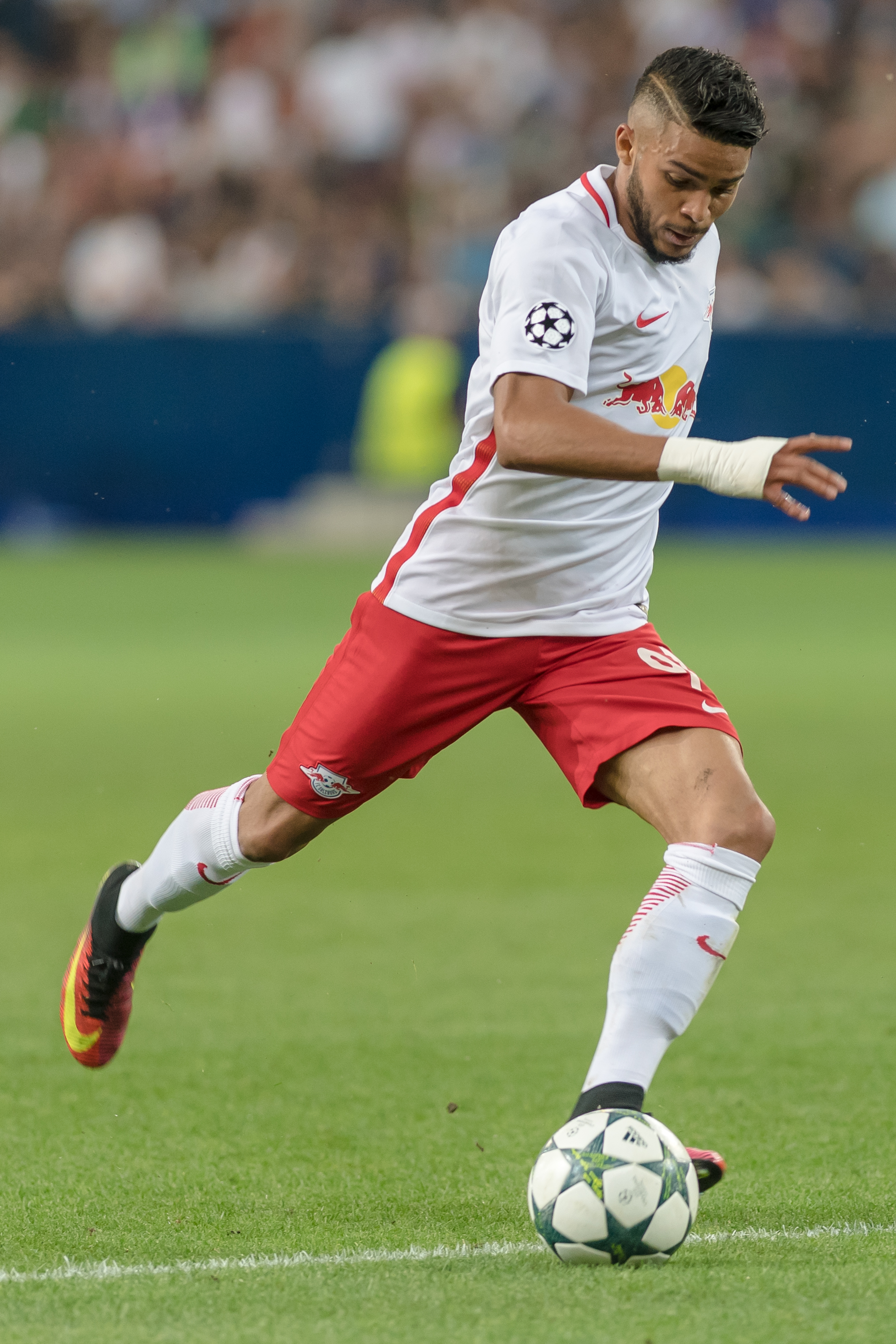
Wanderson in action for Red Bull Salzburg

On 1 July 2016, Wanderson signed a three-year deal with FC Red Bull Salzburg on a free transfer. He scored his first goal on 3 August 2016 in the match against Partizani Tirana in the UEFA Champions League.

On 19 December 2016, Red Bull Salzburg announced that Wanderson had retroactively been handed a four-month suspension by FIFA that would end on 27 February 2017, due to a breach of the transfer terms during his move from Belgian club Lierse to Getafe in the summer of 2015.

=== Krasnodar ===
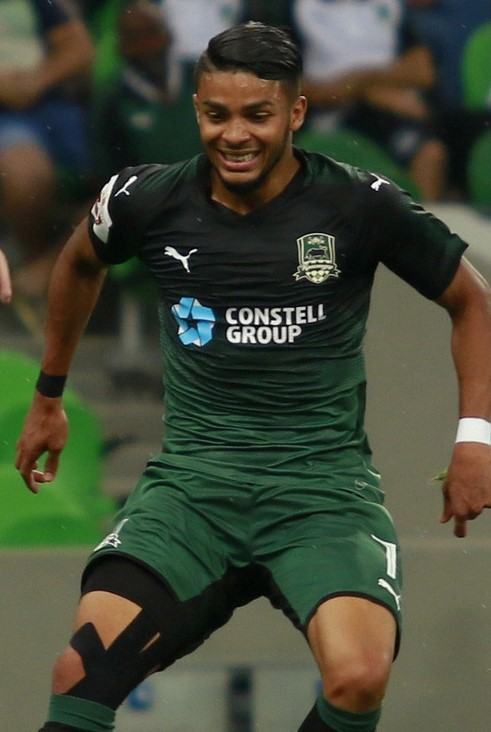
Wanderson with Krasnodar in 2017

On 26 June 2017, Wanderson signed a five-year contract with the Russian Premier League club FC Krasnodar. On 3 March 2022, following the Russian invasion of Ukraine, Krasnodar announced that his contract is suspended and he will not train with the team, but the contract is not terminated and remains valid.

=== Internacional ===
On 11 March 2022, Wanderson joined Internacional on loan until the end of 2022, with an option to buy. On 21 December 2022, FC Krasnodar announced that Internacional activated their option to buy, making the move permanent.

Despite not being a prolific goalscorer, Wanderson has been a particular highlight for Inter as an assist-maker specially in the 2023 season, under coach Eduardo Coudet and pairing up with Ecuatorian striker Enner Valencia. He leaded the club with 12 assists during his second year in Porto Alegre. Nonetheless, he scored important goals during the wins against Bahia (28 May, home), rivals Grêmio (8 October, home), Cruzeiro (5 November, away) and Corinthians (2 December, away).

== Personal life ==
Wanderson is the son of former footballer Wamberto, who notably represented Standard Liège and Ajax. His older brother Danilo is also a midfielder, and was also an Ajax youth graduate. He also holds Belgian nationality.

== Career statistics ==
=== Club ===
As of 7 December 2023

Club	Season	League			Cup		Continental		Other		Total	
Club	Season	Division	Apps	Goals	Apps	Goals	Apps	Goals	Apps	Goals	Apps	Goals
Beerschot	2012–13	Belgian First Division A	6	0	0	0	–		–		6	0
Lierse	2013–14	Belgian First Division A	27	2	2	0	–		–		29	2
Lierse	2014–15	Belgian First Division A	28	2	2	0	–		2 (Note: Two appearances in relegation play-offs)	0	32	2
Lierse	Total		55	4	4	0	0	0	2	0	61	4
Getafe	2015–16	La Liga	20	0	1	0	–		–		21	0
Getafe B	2015–16	Segunda División B	5	2	–		–		–		5	2
Red Bull Salzburg	2016–17	Austrian Football Bundesliga	20	3	3	1	5	1	–		28	5
Krasnodar	2017–18	Russian Premier League	26	3	1	0	4	0	–		31	3
Krasnodar	2018–19	Russian Premier League	30	6	2	0	10	1	–		42	7
Krasnodar	2019–20	Russian Premier League	21	4	0	0	7	0	–		28	4
Krasnodar	2020–21	Russian Premier League	21	2	1	0	7	1	–		29	3
Krasnodar	Total		98	15	4	0	28	2	0	0	130	17
Internacional	2022	Série A	26	6	0	0	6	1	–		32	7
Internacional	2023	Série A	32	7	4	0	12	0	13	1	61	8
Internacional	Total		58	13	4	0	17	1	13	1	93	15
Career total			262	37	16	1	50	4	15	1	344	43

== Honours ==
Red Bull Salzburg

- Austrian Bundesliga: 2016–17
- Austrian Cup: 2016–17

Individual

- Russian Premier League Right Winger of the Season: 2018–19
- Russian Premier League Left Winger of the Season: 2019–20
