= Oleg Lanin =

Russian footballer

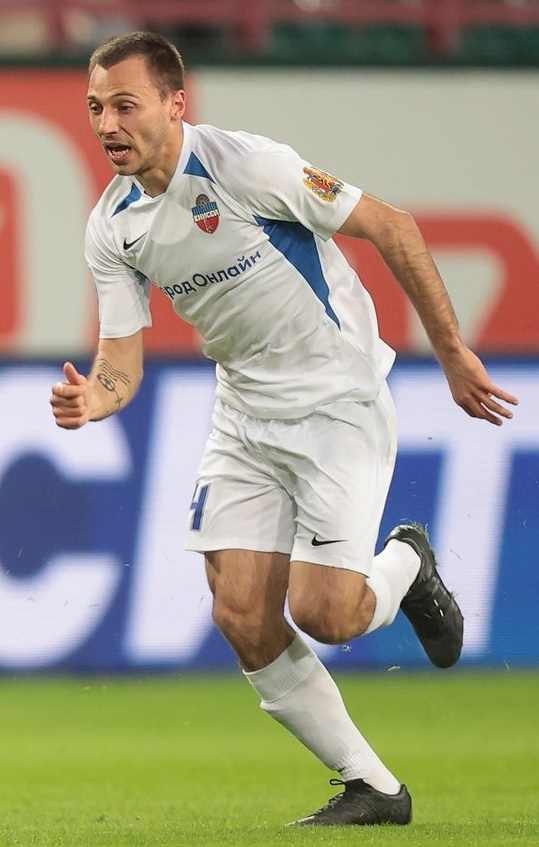
- Lanin with Yenisey in 2022

Personal information
- Full name: Oleg Olegovich Lanin
- Date of birth: 22 January 1996 (age 30)
- Place of birth: Ust-Labinsk, Russia
- Height: 1.77 m (5 ft 9 1/2 in)
- Position: Midfielder

Team information
- Current team: Shinnik Yaroslavl
- Number: 64

Senior career*
Years	Team	Apps	(Gls)
2012–2019	Krasnodar	0	(0)
2014–2015	→ Krasnodar-2	25	(1)
2015–2016	→ Baltika Kaliningrad (loan)	37	(1)
2016–2017	→ Yenisey Krasnoyarsk (loan)	37	(1)
2017–2018	→ Krylia Sovetov Samara (loan)	39	(0)
2019	→ Khimki (loan)	10	(0)
2019	→ Yenisey Krasnoyarsk (loan)	20	(0)
2019–2024	Yenisey Krasnoyarsk	113	(0)
2024–2025	Chernomorets Novorossiysk	32	(0)
2025–	Shinnik Yaroslavl	27	(0)

International career^{‡}
2014	Russia U-18	4	(0)
2017–2018	Russia U-21	12	(0)
- * Club domestic league appearances and goals as of 16 May 2026 ‡ National team caps and goals as of 12 October 2018

Oleg Olegovich Lanin (Russian: Олег Олегович Ланин; born 22 January 1996) is a Russian football player who plays for Shinnik Yaroslavl.

== Club career ==
He made his professional debut in the Russian Professional Football League for FC Krasnodar-2 on 10 April 2014 in a game against FC Mashuk-KMV Pyatigorsk.

He made his debut for the main squad of FC Krasnodar on 30 October 2013 in a Russian Cup game against FC Dolgoprudny.

He made his Russian Premier League debut for PFC Krylia Sovetov Samara on 31 July 2018 in a game against PFC CSKA Moscow.

On 21 January 2019, he joined FC Khimki on loan until the end of the 2018–19 season, with Khimki holding a buyout option.

On 21 June 2019, he re-joined Yenisey Krasnoyarsk on loan for the 2019–20 season. On 30 December 2019, his contract with Krasnodar was terminated by mutual consent, and he signed a 1.5-year contract with Yenisey.
