= Cristian Ramírez (Ecuadorian footballer) =

Ecuadorian footballer (born 1994)

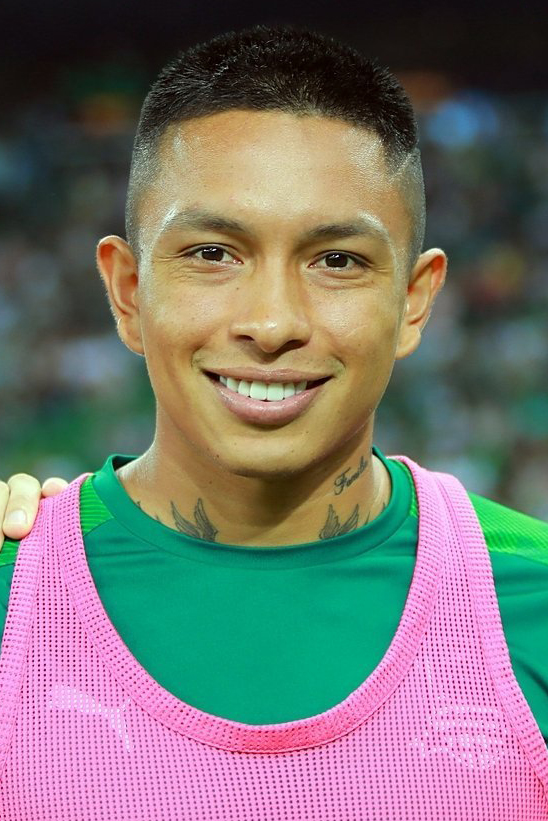
- Ramírez with Krasnodar in 2019

Personal information
- Full name: Cristian Leonel Ramírez Zambrano
- Date of birth: 12 August 1994 (age 32)
- Place of birth: Santo Domingo, Ecuador
- Height: 1.72 m (5 ft 8 in)
- Position: Left-back

Team information
- Current team: Lokomotiv Moscow
- Number: 2

Youth career
- 2008–2009: CSCyD Brasilia
- 2009–2011: Independiente DV

Senior career*
| Years | Team | Apps | (Gls) |
| 2011–2012 | Independiente DV | 52 | (0) |
| 2013–2015 | Fortuna Düsseldorf | 16 | (0) |
| 2014–2015 | → Nürnberg (loan) | 7 | (0) |
| 2015 | → Ferencváros (loan) | 13 | (0) |
| 2015–2016 | Ferencváros | 42 | (4) |
| 2017–2023 | Krasnodar | 135 | (2) |
| 2023–2025 | Ferencváros | 45 | (1) |
| 2025– | Lokomotiv Moscow | 8 | (0) |

International career^{‡}
| 2011 | Ecuador U17 | 13 | (0) |
| 2013 | Ecuador U20 | 7 | (0) |
| 2013– | Ecuador | 22 | (1) |
- * Club domestic league appearances and goals as of 15 March 2026 ‡ National team caps and goals as of 10 October 2024

Cristian Leonel Ramírez Zambrano (Spanish pronunciation: [ˈkɾistjan raˈmiɾes]; born 12 August 1994) is an Ecuadorian professional footballer who plays as a left-back for Lokomotiv Moscow of the Russian Premier League and the Ecuador national team. An ambidextrous dribbler, Ramirez has had the foreign press comparing him to Roberto Carlos.

== Club career ==
=== Independiente Jose Teran ===
Having started out early with CSCyD Brasilia, he was signed in 2009 by Independiente Jose Teran. His professional debut came on 28 August 2011, against El Nacional, and started most of his 2011 Serie A games. Throughout the season, he was a defender and attacker against the league's top teams, like LDU Quito, Deportivo Quito, and Barcelona SC. He also gained a reputation, having stopped on their tracks young Ecuadorian talents such as Fidel Martinez and Renato Ibarra; the latter being during Ramirez' debut.

Ramírez continued to play with the starting eleven for the 2012 season. After garnering international attention, he had trials with Borussia Dortmund, though he could not be signed by the club then due to UEFA rules restricting signage of foreign players under 18, and a 10-day trial with Harry Redknapp's Tottenham Hotspur, which began on 3 April 2012.

=== Fortuna Düsseldorf ===
On 25 January 2013, he signed for German Bundesliga club Fortuna Düsseldorf.

=== 1. FC Nürnberg ===
On 17 June 2014, it was confirmed that Cristian would be loaned to Nürnberg for the 2014–2015 season.

=== Ferencváros ===
On 2 April 2016, Ramírez became Hungarian League champion with Ferencvárosi TC after losing to Debreceni VSC 2–1 at the Nagyerdei Stadion in the 2015–16 Nemzeti Bajnokság I season.

=== Krasnodar ===
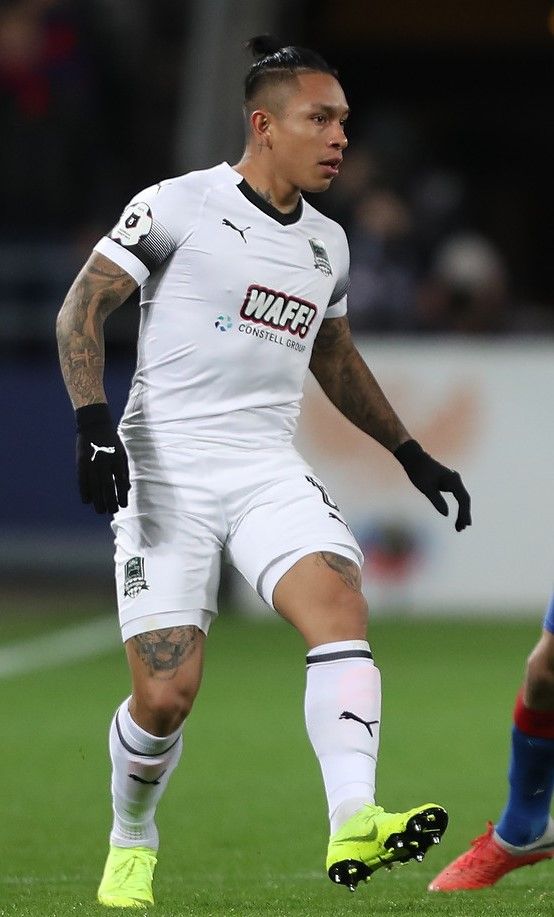
Ramírez playing for Krasnodar in 2018

On 9 January 2017, he signed a 4.5-year contract with the Russian Premier League club Krasnodar. On 20 February 2021, Krasnodar removed him from the official squad registered with the RPL for the rest of the 2020–21 season due to injury. On 15 May 2021, he extended the contract with Krasnodar to 30 June 2025. On 3 March 2022, following the Russian invasion of Ukraine, Krasnodar announced that his contract is suspended and he will not train with the team, but the contract is not terminated and remains valid.

=== Return to Ferencváros ===
On 14 July 2023, Ferencváros announced Ramírez's return.

On 6 August 2023, he scored his first goal in the 2023–24 Nemzeti Bajnokság I season against Fehérvár FC at the Sóstói Stadion.

On 20 April 2024, the Ferencváros–Kisvárda tie ended with a goalless draw at the Groupama Aréna on the 29th match day of the 2023–24 Nemzeti Bajnokság I season which meant that Ferencváros won their 35th championship.

On 15 May 2024, Ferencváros were defeated by Paks 2–0 in the 2024 Magyar Kupa Final at the Puskás Aréna.

=== Lokomotiv Moscow ===
On 26 July 2025, Ramírez returned to Russia and signed a two-year contract with Lokomotiv Moscow.

== International career ==
Ramírez first played for Ecuador in the 2011 under-17 squad, who participated in the 2011 South American U-17 Football Championship, and just barely qualified for the 2011 FIFA U-17 World Cup. Ramírez showcased his footballing skills and mental capacity in the 2011 U-17 World Cup to successfully defend against the likes of Germany, Panama and Burkina Faso. It was in this tournament where he has instantly intrigued the international club scene. As of April 2012, he has been called up for the U-20 squad, to be able to participate in the 2013 U-20 tournaments.

Ramírez was called up for the friendly matches against Argentina and Honduras on 15 and 20 November 2013. He made his debut as a second-half substitute against Honduras.

== Career statistics ==
=== Club ===
As of 19 March 2026

| Club | Season | League | | | Cup | | Continental | | Total | |
| Club | Season | Division | Apps | Goals | Apps | Goals | Apps | Goals | Apps | Goals |
|---|---|---|---|---|---|---|---|---|---|---|
| Independiente del Valle | 2011 | Ecuadorian Serie A | 20 | 0 | 0 | 0 | — | | 20 | 0 |
| Independiente del Valle | 2012 | Ecuadorian Serie A | 32 | 0 | 0 | 0 | — | | 32 | 0 |
| Independiente del Valle | Total | | 52 | 0 | 0 | 0 | 0 | 0 | 52 | 0 |
| Fortuna Düsseldorf | 2012–13 | Bundesliga | 0 | 0 | — | | — | | 0 | 0 |
| Fortuna Düsseldorf | 2013–14 | 2. Bundesliga | 16 | 0 | 1 | 0 | — | | 17 | 0 |
| Fortuna Düsseldorf | Total | | 16 | 0 | 1 | 0 | 0 | 0 | 17 | 0 |
| Nürnberg | 2014–15 | 2. Bundesliga | 7 | 0 | 1 | 0 | — | | 8 | 0 |
| Ferencváros | 2014–15 | Nemzeti Bajnokság I | 13 | 0 | 3 | 1 | — | | 16 | 1 |
| Ferencváros | 2015–16 | Nemzeti Bajnokság I | 28 | 4 | 7 | 0 | 3 (Note: Appearances in UEFA Europa League) | 0 | 38 | 4 |
| Ferencváros | 2016–17 | Nemzeti Bajnokság I | 14 | 0 | 1 | 0 | 2 (Note: Appearances in UEFA Champions League) | 0 | 17 | 0 |
| Ferencváros | Total | | 55 | 4 | 11 | 1 | 5 | 0 | 71 | 5 |
| Krasnodar | 2016–17 | Russian Premier League | 11 | 0 | 1 | 0 | 3 | 0 | 15 | 0 |
| Krasnodar | 2017–18 | Russian Premier League | 20 | 0 | 1 | 0 | 4 | 0 | 25 | 0 |
| Krasnodar | 2018–19 | Russian Premier League | 23 | 0 | 4 | 0 | 8 | 0 | 35 | 0 |
| Krasnodar | 2019–20 | Russian Premier League | 26 | 0 | 1 | 0 | 9 (Note: Three appearances in UEFA Champions League, six appearances in UEFA Europa League) | 0 | 36 | 0 |
| Krasnodar | 2020–21 | Russian Premier League | 16 | 0 | 0 | 0 | 8 | 1 | 24 | 1 |
| Krasnodar | 2021–22 | Russian Premier League | 12 | 0 | 1 | 0 | — | | 13 | 0 |
| Krasnodar | 2022–23 | Russian Premier League | 27 | 2 | 12 | 0 | — | | 39 | 2 |
| Krasnodar | Total | | 135 | 2 | 20 | 0 | 32 | 1 | 187 | 3 |
| Ferencváros | 2023–24 | Nemzeti Bajnokság I | 24 | 1 | 4 | 0 | 10 (Note: Appearances in UEFA Conference League) | 1 | 38 | 2 |
| Ferencváros | 2024–25 | Nemzeti Bajnokság I | 21 | 0 | 3 | 1 | 13 (Note: Four appearances in UEFA Champions League, nine appearances in UEFA Europa League) | 0 | 37 | 1 |
| Ferencváros | Total | | 45 | 1 | 7 | 1 | 23 | 1 | 75 | 3 |
| Lokomotiv Moscow | 2025–26 | Russian Premier League | 8 | 0 | 7 | 0 | — | | 15 | 0 |
| Career total | | | 318 | 7 | 47 | 2 | 60 | 2 | 425 | 11 |

=== International ===
As of match played 10 October 2024

Appearances and goals by national team and year
| National team | Year | Apps | Goals |
|---|---|---|---|
| Ecuador | 2013 | 1 | 0 |
| Ecuador | 2014 | 3 | 0 |
| Ecuador | 2016 | 2 | 0 |
| Ecuador | 2017 | 2 | 0 |
| Ecuador | 2018 | 10 | 1 |
| Ecuador | 2019 | 3 | 0 |
| Ecuador | 2024 | 1 | 0 |
| Total | | 22 | 1 |

Scores and results list Ecuador's goal tally first, score column indicates score after each Ramírez goal.

List of international goals scored by Cristian Ramírez
| No. | Date | Venue | Opponent | Score | Result | Competition |
|---|---|---|---|---|---|---|
| 1 | 6 October 2016 | Estadio Olímpico Atahualpa, Quito, Ecuador | Chile | 2–0 | 3–0 | 2018 FIFA World Cup qualification |

== Honours ==
Ferencváros

- Hungarian League (3): 2015–16, 2023–24, 2024–25
- Hungarian Cup (3): 2014–15, 2015–16, 2016–17
- Hungarian League Cup: 2014–15

== Personal life ==
On 3 June 2021, he acquired citizenship of Russia after playing in the country for 4.5 years.

In an interview with Nemzeti Sport, he said that he "used to spend Christmas at his home in Ecuador. However, in the last couple of years [he] usually spends his winter holiday with his family in an Asian country". He said that he is very satisfied with the results achieved in the 2023–24 UEFA Europa Conference League with Ferencvárosi TC and it does not matter if they have to face with Olympiacos F.C. in the knock-out stage.
