= Aleksei Gritsayenko =

Russian footballer

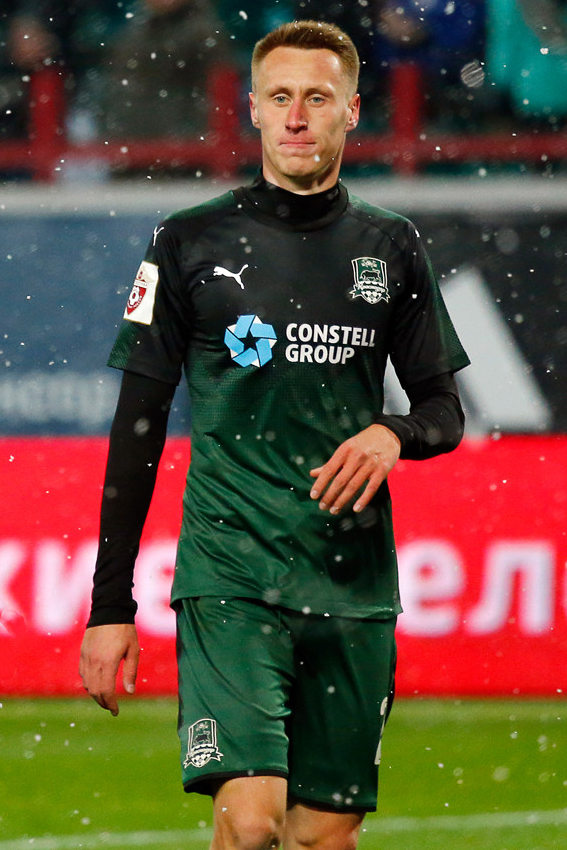
- Gristayenko with Krasnodar in 2017

Personal information
- Full name: Aleksei Aleksandrovich Gritsayenko
- Date of birth: 25 May 1995 (age 31)
- Place of birth: Vladivostok, Russia
- Height: 1.86 m (6 ft 1 in)
- Position: Centre-back

Team information
- Current team: Rubin Kazan
- Number: 27

Senior career*
Years	Team	Apps	(Gls)
2015–2017	Luch-Energiya Vladivostok	49	(3)
2017–2020	Krasnodar	10	(1)
2018	→ Krasnodar-2	4	(0)
2018–2019	→ Yenisey Krasnoyarsk (loan)	16	(0)
2019	→ Krasnodar-2	4	(0)
2019–2020	→ Tambov (loan)	19	(1)
2020	Tambov	10	(1)
2021–	Rubin Kazan	94	(2)
2021–2022	→ Kuban Krasnodar (loan)	24	(1)
- * Club domestic league appearances and goals as of 2 May 2026

Aleksei Aleksandrovich Gritsayenko (Russian: Алексей Александрович Грицаенко; born 25 May 1995) is a Russian football player who plays as a centre-back for Rubin Kazan.

== Club career ==
Gritsayenko made his debut in the Russian Football National League for Luch-Energiya Vladivostok on 11 March 2016 in a game against Spartak-2 Moscow.

On 13 June 2017, Gritsayenko signed a 4-year contract with Krasnodar.

On 14 June 2018, he joined Yenisey Krasnoyarsk on loan for the 2018–19 season.

On 2 September 2019, Gritsayenko joined Tambov on loan for the 2019–20 season.

On 10 August 2020, he reached agreement with Krasnodar to terminate their contract and signed a two-year contract with Tambov.

On 1 February 2021, Gritsayenko signed a 4-year contract with Rubin Kazan. On 2 September 2021, he joined Kuban Krasnodar on loan for the 2021–22 season. On 4 September 2024, he extended his contract with Rubin to June 2027.

== Career statistics ==
As of match played 2 May 2026

Appearances and goals by club, season and competition
Club	Season	League			Cup		Europe		Other		Total	
Club	Season	Division	Apps	Goals	Apps	Goals	Apps	Goals	Apps	Goals	Apps	Goals
Luch-Energiya Vladivostok	2015–16	Russian First League	14	0	0	0	—		—		14	0
Luch-Energiya Vladivostok	2016–17	Russian First League	35	3	1	0	—		—		36	3
Luch-Energiya Vladivostok	Total		49	3	1	0	0	0	0	0	50	3
Krasnodar	2017–18	Russian Premier League	10	1	1	0	0	0	—		11	1
Krasnodar	2019–20	Russian Premier League	0	0	—		0	0	—		0	0
Krasnodar	Total		10	1	1	0	0	0	0	0	11	1
Krasnodar-2	2017–18	Russian Second League	4	0	—		—		—		4	0
Krasnodar-2	2019–20	Russian First League	4	0	—		—		—		4	0
Krasnodar-2	Total		8	0	0	0	0	0	0	0	8	0
Yenisey Krasnoyarsk (loan)	2018–19	Russian Premier League	16	0	2	0	—		—		18	0
Tambov (loan)	2019–20	Russian Premier League	19	1	1	0	—		3 (Note: Appearances in the FNL Cup)	2	23	3
Tambov	2020–21	Russian Premier League	10	1	1	0	—		—		11	1
Rubin Kazan	2020–21	Russian Premier League	0	0	—		—		—		0	0
Rubin Kazan	2021–22	Russian Premier League	0	0	—		0	0	—		0	0
Rubin Kazan	2022–23	Russian First League	28	1	1	0	—		—		29	1
Rubin Kazan	2023–24	Russian Premier League	29	1	3	0	—		—		32	1
Rubin Kazan	2024–25	Russian Premier League	24	0	6	0	—		—		30	0
Rubin Kazan	2025–26	Russian Premier League	12	0	4	0	—		—		16	0
Rubin Kazan	Total		93	2	14	0	0	0	0	0	107	2
Kuban Krasnodar (loan)	2021–22	Russian First League	26	1	1	0	—		—		27	1
Career total			231	9	21	0	0	0	3	2	255	11
