= Ilya Vorotnikov (footballer, born 2001) =

Russian footballer

Personal information
- Full name: Ilya Vladimirovich Vorotnikov
- Date of birth: 11 February 2001 (age 25)
- Place of birth: Novaya Usman, Russia
- Height: 1.66 m (5 ft 5 in)
- Position: Forward

Team information
- Current team: Dynamo St. Petersburg
- Number: 37

Youth career
- –2013: DYuSSh Novaya Usman
- 2013–2014: FCS-73 Voronezh
- 2014–2019: Krasnodar

Senior career*
Years	Team	Apps	(Gls)
2018–2019	Krasnodar-3	3	(0)
2019–2022	Krasnodar-2	57	(4)
2020	Krasnodar	1	(0)
2022	SKA Rostov-on-Don	15	(1)
2023	Sokol Saratov	0	(0)
2023–2024	Leon Saturn Ramenskoye	14	(1)
2024	Astrakhan	13	(0)
2025	PSK Dinskaya (amateur)		
2026	PSK Dinskaya	0	(0)
2026–	Dynamo St. Petersburg	6	(0)

International career^{‡}
2017–2018	Russia U-17	14	(3)
- * Club domestic league appearances and goals as of 1 November 2026 ‡ National team caps and goals as of 2 March 2018

Ilya Vladimirovich Vorotnikov (Russian: Илья Владимирович Воротников; born 11 February 2001) is a Russian football player who plays as a left winger for Dynamo St. Petersburg.

== Club career ==
He made his debut in the Russian Professional Football League for Krasnodar-3 on 27 August 2018 in a game against Spartak Nalchik. He made his Russian Football National League debut for Krasnodar-2 on 28 July 2019 in a game against Yenisey Krasnoyarsk.

He made his Russian Premier League debut for Krasnodar on 9 July 2020 in a game against Rubin Kazan, replacing Tonny Vilhena in the 75th minute.
