= List of shipwrecks in October 1860 =

The list of shipwrecks in October 1860 includes ships sunk, foundered, grounded, or otherwise lost during October 1860.

== 1 October ==
List of shipwrecks: 1 October 1860
Ship	State	Description
Dart	(United Kingdom of Great Britain and Ireland) British North America	The schooner was wrecked at St. Esprit, Nova Scotia. She was on a voyage from Burin, Newfoundland to Halifax, Nova Scotia.
George William	United Kingdom	The barque foundered in the Dogger Bank. Her nine crew were rescued by the barque Christian (Norway). George William was on a voyage from Sunderland, County Durham to Hamburg.
Release	United Kingdom	The schooner was wrecked at the mouth of the Thunder River, Province of Canada, British North America Her eight crew survived.

== 2 October ==
List of shipwrecks: 2 October 1860
Ship	State	Description
Edinburgh	United Kingdom	The steamship departed from Leith, Lothian for Kronstadt, Russia. No further trace, presumed foundered with the loss of all 28 crew.
Habanero Manuel	Chile	The ship was wrecked in the Maule River.
Moscow	United Kingdom	The steamship foundered off Skagen, Denmark with the loss of all on board. Wreckage from the ship washed ashore on the Danish coast. She was on a voyage from Grimsby, Lincolnshire to Saint Petersburg, Russia.
Rapid	United Kingdom	The brig was driven ashore at Audierne, Finistère, France. She was refloated and taken in to Audierne.
Sarah	(United Kingdom of Great Britain and Ireland) New Zealand	The schooner was wrecked at Taieri Mouth in New Zealand. The vessel was waiting for high water in order to cross the bar, but a gale blew up and the Sarah began to take on water. To reduce the risk of losing lives, the captain tried to enter the river, but struck the bar. The crew took to a lifeboat and were saved. Before they could return to free the ship, the wind changed direction, blowing her off the bar. She sank in the rivermouth's channel.
Swift	United Kingdom	The schooner foundered in the North Sea with the loss of all nine hands. She was on a voyage from Newport, Monmouthshire to Kronstadt.
Thalia	United Kingdom	The ship departed from the River Tyne for Kronstadt. No further trace, presumed foundered with the loss of all hands.
Ugie	United Kingdom	The ship departed from Newcastle upon Tyne, Northumberland for Peterhead, Aberdeenshire. No further trace, presumed foundered with the loss of all hands.
Volant	United Kingdom	The ship departed from Newcastle upon Tyne for Peterhead. No further trace, presumed foundered with the loss of all hands.

== 3 October ==
List of shipwrecks: 3 October 1860
Ship	State	Description
Agnes	United Kingdom	The smack was driven ashore and severely damaged at Innellan, Argyllshire.
Agnes Anderson	United Kingdom	The full-rigged ship was driven ashore and wrecked 2 nautical miles (3.7 km) south of Portpatrick, Wigtownshire with the loss of two of her 25 crew. She was on a voyage from Dublin to Saint John, New Brunswick, British North America.
Agnette Johanne	Kingdom of Hanover	The ship collided with another vessel in the North Sea 12 nautical miles (22 km) off Hartlepool, County Durham, United Kingdom and was abandoned by all but her captain. They were rescued by the smack Gauntlet (United Kingdom). Agnette Johanne was on a voyage from Emden to Sunderland, County Durham.
Albrecht Thaer	Kingdom of Hanover	The schooner was wrecked at Ferring north of Bovbjerg near Lemvig, Denmark, on voyage from Antwerp to Riga.
Alma	France	The schooner was abandoned in the North Sea off the Dutch coast. Her crew were rescued by a Dutch pilot boat. She was on a voyage from "Requejada" to Dordrecht, South Holland, Netherlands.
Anna	Wismar	The schooner was abandoned in the North Sea. Her crew were rescued. She was on a voyage from Söderhamn, Sweden to Newcastle upon Tyne, Northumberland, United Kingdom.
Annie and Keith	United Kingdom	The ship was wrecked on Inchkeith, Fife with the loss of all hands.
Aquila	United Kingdom	The cutter was driven ashore and wrecked at Fort Matilda, Renfrewshire.
Ariel	Norway	The schooner was driven ashore and severely damaged near Peterhead, Aberdeenshire, United Kingdom. Her crew were rescued. Ariel was on a voyage from Sandefjord to Fraserburgh, Aberdeenshire. She was refloated on 5 October.
Aunt Mary	United Kingdom	The barque was abandoned off Tory Island, County Donegal. Her thirteen crew were rescued. She was on a voyage from Sunderland to Saint John's, Newfoundland, British North America. Ann Mary came ashore at Dunaff Head, County Londonderry and was wrecked.
Bambro' Castle	United Kingdom	The schooner was driven ashore near Saltcoats, Ayrshire. Her crew were rescued.
Black Bess	United Kingdom	The yawl was wrecked at Oban, Argyllshire.
Brooksby	United Kingdom	The smack was severely damaged at Oban.
Caledonia	United Kingdom	The schooner was wrecked at sea off the Isle of Arran with the loss of all hands. She was on a voyage from Londonderry to Troon, Ayrshire. She was towed in to Greenock, Renfrewshire on 6 October by the tug General Williams (United Kingdom).
Camden	United States	The barque was damaged at Greenock. She was on a voyage from Greenock to New York.
Caroline	United Kingdom	The barque capsized at South Shields, County Durham.
Clarence	United Kingdom	The barque was driven ashore at Troon. Her crew were rescued.
Cleafthe	Austrian Empire	The brig was driven ashore at Büyükdere, Ottoman Empire. She was on a voyage from Odesa, Russia to Constantinople, Ottoman Empire. She was refloated.
Cygnet	United Kingdom	The ship was beached at "Innisgarth", County Mayo. She was refloated on 14 October but had to be scuttled.
Dart	United Kingdom	The schooner was driven ashore and wrecked at Hunstanton, Norfolk. Her crew were rescued. She was on a voyage from Wisbech, Cambridgeshire to Hunstanton.
David Edwards	United Kingdom	The sloop was driven ashore at Dundee, Forfarshire. Her crew were rescued.
Derby	United Kingdom	The ship was driven ashore and wrecked in Dunnet Bay.
Despatch	United Kingdom	The ship was driven ashore at Montrose, Forfarshire. She was refloated and taken in to Montrose.
Diligence	United Kingdom	The brigantine was driven ashore at Hartlepool. She was on a voyage from Sunderland to Rouen, Seine-Inférieure, France. She was refloated with the assistance of two tugs and taken in to Hartlepool.
Draper	United Kingdom	The ship was damaged at Jarrow, Northumberland.
Earl of Zetland	United Kingdom	The schooner was driven ashore in the Sound of Jura. She was on a voyage from Liverpool, Lancashire to Dundee. She was refloated and taken in to Oban
Economy	United Kingdom	The ship was presumed to have foundered with the loss of all hands. She was on a voyage from "Wyburg" to a British port.
Eliza	United Kingdom	The collier, a schooner, was driven ashore at Ayr. Her crew were rescued.
Eliza Kirkbride	United Kingdom	The ship was driven ashore 8 nautical miles (15 km) north of Libava, Courland Governorate with the loss of all nine people on board. She was on a voyage from Hartlepool to Kronstadt, Russia.
Ellen	United Kingdom	The ship was driven ashore at Troon. She was on a voyage from Carlingford, County Louth to Troon.
Emanuel	Sweden	The sloop was driven ashore at Rattray Head, Aberdeenshire with the loss of a crew member. She was on a voyage from Buckie, Banffshire to Harburg.
Emma	United Kingdom	The brig was abandoned in the North Sea. Her crew were rescued by the brig Pomerania ( Stettin). Emma was on a voyage from Viborg, Denmark to Ipswich, Suffolk.
Enterprize	United Kingdom	The schooner sprang a leak and was beached at Robin Hoods Bay, Yorkshire. Her crew were rescued. She was on a voyage from Hartlepool to Scarborough, Yorkshire.
Expert	United Kingdom	The ship driven ashore and wrecked south of Whitby, Yorkshire. Her six crew were rescued. She was on a voyage from London to Seaham, County Durham. Expert was refloated on 16 October and taken in to Whitby.
Fair Maid	United Kingdom	The schooner was driven ashore at Dundee.
Fairy	United Kingdom	The ship was wrecked in Saltwick Bay. Her crew survived. She was on a voyage from Whitby to Port Mulgrave, Yorkshire.
Farmer	United Kingdom	The sloop was driven ashore at Boulmer, Northumberland. She was refloated on 6 October and taken in to Warkworth, Northumberland.
Forest Queen	United Kingdom	The schooner was driven ashore at Troon. Her crew were rescued. She was on a voyage from Exeter, Devon to Greenock. Forest Queen was refloated on 16 October and taken in to Troon.
Friends	United Kingdom	The sloop was driven ashore at Campbeltown, Argyllshire. All on board were rescued. She was on a voyage from Wick, Caithness to Londonderry.
Friend's Goodwill	United Kingdom	The fishing boat was wrecked on the Little Ford Bank, in the River Wyre. Her crew survived.
Friendship	United Kingdom	The sloop foundered at Scarborough. All on board Survived.
Garibaldi	United Kingdom	The yacht was presumed to have foundered off Rothesay, Isle of Bute.
Globe	United Kingdom	The ship was damaged at South Shields.
Guthries	United Kingdom	The ship was driven ashore and wrecked at Rattray Head. Her crew were rescued by the Coast Guard. She was on a voyage from East Wemyss, Fife to Thurso, Caithness.
Haidee	United Kingdom	The schooner was driven ashore at Blackpool, Lancashire with the loss of a crew member. She was on a voyage from Morar, Inverness-shire to Liverpool. She had become a wreck by 12 October.
Helene	Sweden	The barque was driven ashore at Thisted, Denmark. Her crew were rescued. she was on a voyage from London, United Kingdom to Söderhamn, Sweden.
Hendericka Frederika	Netherlands	The galiot foundered at Greenock. Her crew were rescued by the tug Vixen (United Kingdom).
Hertha	Prussia	The barque was driven ashore at Thisted. Her crew were rescued. She was on a voyage from London to Danzig. She had become a wreck by 13 October.
Hope	United Kingdom	The brigantine was driven ashore at Troon. Her crew were rescued. She was on a voyage from Carrickfergus, County Antrim to Troon. She was refloated on 17 October and taken in to Troon.
Industry	United Kingdom	The schooner was driven ashore at Fleetwood, Lancashire. Her crew were rescued. She was on a voyage from Ulverston to Liverpool.
Industry	United Kingdom	The ship was driven ashore and damaged at Bangor, County Down.
Jane and Mary	United Kingdom	The schooner was driven ashore and wrecked at Speymouth, Moray with the loss of all five crew. She was on a voyage from Sunderland to Lossiemouth, Moray.
Jeanie	United Kingdom	The lighter foundered off South Queensferry, Lothian with the loss of all three of her crew. She was on a voyage from Leith, Lothian to Grangemouth, Stirlingshire.
Jehu	United Kingdom	The ship was damaged at Jarrow.
John	United Kingdom	The ship was severely damaged at Jarrow.
John	United Kingdom	The brig was driven ashore at Troon. Her crew were rescued. She was on a voyage from Belfast, County Antrim to Troon. She was refloated on 17 October and taken in to Troon.
Kelpie	United Kingdom	The schooner was driven ashore in "Loch Keilisport". Her crew were rescued.
Keltie	United Kingdom	The sloop was driven ashore at Sandsend, Yorkshire. Her crew were rescued by the Whitby Lifeboat. She was on a voyage from South Shields to Sandsend.
Kent	United Kingdom	The brig was abandoned off Skagen, Denmark. Her seven crew survived. She was subsequently beached on Skagen and was wrecked there.
Lass o'Gowrie	United Kingdom	The steamship was severely damaged at Dundee when the barque Island Home (United Kingdom) was driven into her.
Louis A. Surette	United Kingdom	The collier, a schooner, was driven ashore at Ayr. Her crew were rescued. She was refloated and taken in to Ayr.
Lucy Ann	United Kingdom	The ship was driven ashore at Whitby. She was later refloated and taken in to Whitby.
Margaret	United Kingdom	The schooner was driven ashore at Ardrossan, Ayrshire.
Margaret	United Kingdom	The collier ran aground and was damaged in the River Tyne at Stanhope, County Durham. She was refloated with assistance from the tug Paragon (United Kingdom).
Margaret	United Kingdom	The brig was driven ashore at Troon. Her crew were rescued. She was on a voyage from Dundalk, County Louth to Troon. She was refloated in February 1861, and towed in to Ardrossan, Ayrshire, where she arrived on 5 February.
Margaret Ann	United Kingdom	The fishing boat capsized in the Irish Sea. She was driven ashore at Blackpool with the loss of both crew.
Margaretha	Flag unknown	The ship was wrecked near Lemvig, Denmark. Her crew were rescued. She was on a voyage from Rostock to London.
Margaretha Hendrika	Netherlands	The galiot sank at Greenock. Her crew were rescued by the tug Vixen (United Kingdom). Margaretha Hendrika was on a voyage from Greenock to Sagua La Grande, Cuba.
Mary	United Kingdom	The brig was driven ashore and severely damaged at Pettycur, Fife. She had been under tow from Dundee to St. Davids.
Mary	United Kingdom	The smack was driven ashore at Scourie, Caithness. Her crew were rescued. She was on a voyage from Portsoy, Aberdeenshire to "Kirpond" and Scourie.
Mary Stewart	United Kingdom	The brig was driven ashore at Troon. Her crew were rescued. She was on a voyage from Londonderry to Troon.
Metha	Flag unknown	The schooner was driven ashore and wrecked at Thisted with the loss of a crew member. She was on a voyage from Saint Petersburg, Russia to London.
News, and Oak	United Kingdom	News broke free from her moorings at South Shields and was driven into the brig Oak. Both vessels were severely damaged.
Ocean	United Kingdom	The ship was driven ashore at Whitby. She was later refloated and taken in to Whitby.
Onward	United Kingdom	The barque was driven into another vessel and damaged at Dundee.
Peggy	United Kingdom	The smack foundered in Blackfarland Bay. Her crew were rescued.
Phædo	United Kingdom	The brig was wrecked in the Baltic Sea with the loss of seven of her nine crew, or nine of her thirteen crew. She was on a voyage from Vyborg, Grand Duchy of Finland to London.
Port Dundas	United Kingdom	The schooner was abandoned off Aberdeen. She was on a voyage from Thurso to Newcastle upon Tyne.
Raynard	United Kingdom	The schooner was abandoned in the Firth of Forth. She was subsequently discovered by the steamship Britannia (United Kingdom), which put three crew aboard. Raynard was towed in to Leith by a tug.
Renfrew	United Kingdom	The lighter was driven ashore at Cardross, Dunbartonshire.
Resolution	United Kingdom	The brigantine was driven into the brig John (United Kingdom) and was driven ashore and severely damaged at Troon. She was on a voyage from Londonderry to Troon.
Richard	Danzig	The barque was driven ashore at Thisted. Her crew were rescued.
Rose	United Kingdom	The sloop was beached at Macduff, Aberdeenshire, where she was wrecked. Her crew were rescued.
Salonica	United Kingdom	The brig was driven into several vessel and then into the dock gates at Sunderland and was severely damaged.
Sisters	United Kingdom	The sloop was driven ashore in Perrycurvick Creek. She was on a voyage from Leith, Lothian to St Abbs Head, Berwickshire. She became a wreck on 10 October.
Sunbeam	United Kingdom	The ship was driven ashore in "Loch Cosset".
Sutcliffe	United Kingdom	The ship was driven ashore at Ardrossan. Her crew were rescued. She was on a voyage from Ardrossan to Cork.
Thomas	United Kingdom	The sloop was driven ashore and wrecked at the entrance to Loch Striven.
Thor	Denmark	The steamship was presumed to have foundered with the loss of all on board. She was on a voyage from Copenhagen to Hull, Yorkshire.
Venus	United Kingdom	The brig foundered off the coast of Zeeland, Netherlands. Her crew were rescued.
Vrouw Alida	United Kingdom	The tjalk foundered in the Dogger Bank with the loss of all but one of her crew. She was on a voyage from Newcastle upon Tyne to Tønning, Duchy of Holstein.
Wellington	United Kingdom	The Mersey Flat was driven ashore north of Whitehaven, Cumberland. Her crew were rescued. She was on a voyage from Saltney, Cheshire to Whitehaven.
William	United Kingdom	The tug sank at South Shields. She was refloated on 6 October and found to be in a wrecked condition.
William Alexander	United Kingdom	The schooner foundered with the loss of all six crew. She was on a voyage from Stettin to Gloucester.
Unnamed	Prussia	The ship foundered in the North Sea off the coast of Aberdeenshire with the loss of two of her crew. She was on a voyage from Danzig to Dublin.

== 4 October ==
List of shipwrecks: 4 October 1860
Ship	State	Description
Arctic	United Kingdom	The steamship was wrecked at Lemvig, Denmark with the loss of six of the 30 people on board. She was on a voyage from Hull, Yorkshire to Saint Petersburg, Russia.
Ajax	Sweden	The ship collided with Claudia (Norway) and sank at Helsingør, Denmark. Her crew were rescued. She was on a voyage from Gävle to Hull.
Catherine	United Kingdom	The schooner was wrecked at Beadnell, Northumberland. She was on a voyage from Pittenweem, Fife to Newcastle upon Tyne, Northumberland. She was refloated the next day and taken in to Beadnell.
Clotilde	United Kingdom	The ship was abandoned in the North Sea 20 nautical miles (37 km) north north west of the Dudgeon Lightship ( Trinity House). Her crew were rescued by the fishing smack Maritana (United Kingdom). Clotilde was on a voyage from the River Tyne to New York.
Cyrus	United Kingdom	The snow was driven ashore on Saaremaa, Russia. Her nine crew survived. She was on a voyage from Dundee, Forfarshire to Riga, Russia.
Eidswold	Russian Empire	The ship wrecked at Helsingborg, Sweden. She was on a voyage from Riga to Dundee, Forfarshire, United Kingdom.
Espeigle	France	The brig was driven ashore at Hvidbjerg Vesten Å near Thisted, Denmark 4 October.
Feliza	United Kingdom	The brig was abandoned in the North Sea 80 nautical miles (150 km) west of Lindesnes, Norway. Her crew were rescued by Marie (Prussia). Feliza was on a voyage from South Shields, County Durham to Vyborg, Russia.
George and William	United Kingdom	The Yorkshire Billyboy collided with the brig John Middleton (United Kingdom) and foundered in the North Sea off Whitby, Yorkshire. Her crew were rescued by John Middleton. George and William was on a voyage from Sunderland, County Durham to Lyme Regis, Dorset.
Hellegonda	Netherlands	The koff was driven ashore near "Fjalehery", Denmark. Her crew were rescued. She was on a voyage from Königsberg, Prussia to Hull.
Hendon	United Kingdom	The snow was wrecked at Geestemünde, Prussia with the loss of six of her eight crew. She was on a voyage from Kronstadt, Russia to London.
Jean	United Kingdom	The lighter was lost off Ardlamont Point, Argyllshire with the loss of all three crew. She was on a voyage from Loch Fyne to the Clyde.
Johanne Christina	Flag unknown	The ship was driven ashore near "Lakken".
John and Mary	United Kingdom	The brig was driven ashore and wrecked on Düne, Heligoland. Her eight crew were rescued. She was on a voyage from Hamburg to a British port.
Julie	Stralsund	The schooner was driven ashore 5 nautical miles (9.3 km) west of Fraserburgh, Aberdeenshire, United Kingdom with the loss of two of her eight crew. She was on a voyage from Danzig to Belfast, County Antrim, United Kingdom.
Laurina	United Kingdom	The barque was driven ashore and wrecked at Ringkøbing, Denmark. Her eleven crew were rescued. She was on a voyage from London to Kronstadt.
Mary Ann	United Kingdom	The schooner foundered in the North Sea off the Farne Islands, Northumberland. Her crew were rescued. She was on a voyage from Hartlepool, County Durham to Leith, Lothian.
Mary Read	United Kingdom	The brig was abandoned in the North Sea. Her crew were rescued. She was on a voyage from Seaham, County Durham to Dundee, Forfarshire.
Palme	Stettin	The ship was driven ashore at Thisted, Denmark. She was on a voyage from Sunderland to Stettin.
Prima	Sweden	The brig was driven ashore on Föhr, Duchy of Holstein with the loss of a crew member. She was on a voyage from "Dorusee" to London.
Prince Albert	Norway	The barque was wrecked at Lilleheden, Denmark. Her crew were rescued. She was on a voyage from Oulu, Grand Duchy of Finland to London.
Race Horse	United Kingdom	The brig was abandoned in the South Atlantic. Her nine crew were rescued by D'Alembert (France). Race Horse was on a voyage from Rio de Janeiro, Brazil to Acapulco, Mexico.
Scotia	United Kingdom	The schooner was abandoned in the North Sea 30 nautical miles (56 km) east south east of the Farne Islands. Her four crew were rescued by Union (United Kingdom). She was on a voyage from a port on the east coast of the United Kingdom to Calais, France.
Seralia	(Russian Empire) Grand Duchy of Finland	The brig was abandoned in the North Sea. Her crew were rescued by Hermod (Denmark). Seralia was on a voyage from London to Newcastle upon Tyne.
Sophie	Norway	The schooner was abandoned in the North Sea. She was on a voyage from Riga, Russia to Boston, Lincolnshire, United Kingdom. She was subsequently towed in to Heligoland by the steamship Heligoland ( Heligoland).
St. Lawrence	United Kingdom	The brig was driven ashore and wrecked on Bornholm, Denmark with the loss of seven of her nine crew. She was on a voyage from Newcastle upon Tyne to Kronstadt.
Verbena	United Kingdom	The brig was driven ashore at Cardiff, Glamorgan.
Wellington	United Kingdom	The steamship was wrecked at Ballintoy, County Antrim.
Wheatsheaf	United Kingdom	The ship was driven ashore at North Sunderland, County Durham. She was refloated on 6 October and taken in to North Sunderland.
William and Anne	United Kingdom	The brigantine was wrecked on the Outer Barber Sand, in the North Sea. Her seven crew were rescued by the Scratby Lifeboat. She was on a voyage from Hartlepool to Shoreham-by-Sea, Sussex.
W. W. Scott	United Kingdom	The brig was wrecked at Kirkwall, Orkney Islands with the loss of all ten crew. She was on a voyage from Danzig to Liverpool.

== 5 October ==
List of shipwrecks: 5 October 1860
Ship	State	Description
Clara	United Kingdom	The ship was wrecked off Hunseby, Denmark. Her crew were rescued. She was on a voyage from Danzig to London.
Comet	United Kingdom	The sloop sprang a leak and foundered in the North Sea off the coast of County Durham. Her crew were rescued by the paddle tug Robert Stephenson (United Kingdom) Comet was on a voyage from the River Tyne to Grangemouth, Stirlingshire.
Emile	Kolberg	The barque ran aground on the Newcombe Sand, in the North Sea off the coast of Suffolk, United Kingdom. She was on a voyage from London to Hartlepool, County Durham. She was refloated and taken in to Lowestoft, Suffolk.
Enterprise	United Kingdom	The brig was driven ashore on Mandø, Denmark. She was on a voyage from Hamburg to Hartlepool.
Henry Turner	United Kingdom	The schooner was wrecked off Portmadoc, Caernarfonshire. Her five crew survived.
James	United Kingdom	The schooner sank at Berwick upon Tweed, Northumberland. Her crew were rescued. She was on a voyage from Sunderland to Montrose.
Jenny Lind	United Kingdom	The gabbart sank at the Isle of Arran with the loss of all hands. She was on a voyage from Campbeltown, Argyllshire to Troon, Ayrshire.
John Nelson	United Kingdom	The ship ran aground on Skerry Ness, Orkney Islands. She was on a voyage from Memel, Prussia to Dumfries. She was refloated on 10 November and beached at Stromness, Orkney Islands.
Lucy S. Hale	United Kingdom	The ship was set on fire by her crew at Callao, Peru. She was severely damaged and was consequently condemned.
Madam	United Kingdom	The schooner was wrecked on Gigha. Her crew were rescued.
Muida	Norway	The schooner ran aground on the East Barrow Sand, in the North Sea off the coast of Essex, United Kingdom. She was on a voyage from London to South Shields, County Durham. She was refloated with the assistance of two smacks and taken in to Harwich, Essex.
New Happy Return	United Kingdom	The schooner was driven ashore and wrecked at Lindisfarne, Northumberland.
Trio	United Kingdom	The sloop was wrecked in the Farne Islands, Northumberland. Her crew were rescued.
Oliver Garden	United States	The full-rigged ship foundered 40 nautical miles (74 km) north of Cape Santa Maria, Brazil with the ultimate loss of nine of the 24 people on board. She was on a voyage from Baltimore, Maryland to Panama City, Granadine Confederation.

== 6 October ==
List of shipwrecks: 6 October 1860
Ship	State	Description
Connaught	United Kingdom	During the St. John's, Newfoundland Colony–Boston, Massachusetts, leg of a voyage from Galway, Ireland, to Boston via St. John's, the 4,400-ton sidewheel paddle steamer sprang a leak, caught fire, and sank in the Atlantic Ocean 87 nautical miles (161 km; 100 mi) off the coast of Massachusetts and 150 nautical miles (280 km; 170 mi) east of Boston. All on board, nearly 600 people, were rescued by the brig Minnie Schiffer (United States).
Cecelia Wood	United Kingdom	The ship ran aground on the Rusk Bank, in the Irish Sea. She was on a voyage from Saint John, New Brunswick, British North America to Dublin. She was refloated with assistance from the tug Erin (United Kingdom) and completed her voyage.
England's Queen	United Kingdom	The brig was driven ashore in Nissisiquit Bay, New Brunswick. Her fourteen crew survived. She was on a voyage from Dalhousie, New Brunswick to Sunderland, County Durham. She was consequently condemned.
Flora	Kingdom of Hanover	The schooner was abandoned in the North Sea. Her crew were rescued. She was on a voyage from Peterhead, Aberdeenshire, United Kingdom to Stettin.
Gemini	Netherlands	The galiot was driven ashore and wrecked 5 nautical miles (9.3 km) from Ringkøbing, Denmark. Her crew were rescued. She was on a voyage from Danzig to Leith, Lothian, United Kingdom.
Jamesons	United Kingdom	The brig was wrecked at Norden, Kingdom of Hanover. Her nine crew survived. She was on a voyage from Newcastle upon Tyne, Northumberland to Brake, Kingdom of Hanover.
Jean	United Kingdom	The schooner ran aground on the Salthouse Bank, in the Irish Sea off the coast of Lancashire. She was on a voyage from Sligo to Liverpool, Lancashire. She was refloated and taken in to Lytham St. Annes, Lancashire in a leaky condition.
John Wilson	United Kingdom	The brig was driven ashore on the Skerry of Ness, in the Orkney Islands. She was on a voyage from Memel, Prussia to Dumfries.
Marie Elisabeth	Denmark	The ship driven ashore and wrecked at Rossitten, Prussia.
Robinson	United Kingdom	The snow was abandoned off the coast of Jutland. Her eight crew were rescued by Eleanor Francis (United Kingdom). Robinson was on a voyage from Hamburg to Hartlepool, County Durham. Robinson came ashore at Hallerholmen, Sweden on 20 October.
Theresa	Kingdom of Hanover	The schooner was abandoned in the North Sea. Her crew were rescued by Anna Margaretha (Flag unknown). Theresa was on a voyage from Riga, Russia to London, United Kingdom.
Triumph	United Kingdom	The schooner was wrecked on Hog Island, Philadelphia, United States.
Venus	United Kingdom	The schooner foundered in the North Sea off Hellevoetsluis, Zeeland, Netherlands. Her seven crew survived. She was on a voyage from Stockton-on-Tees, County Durham to Geestemünde, Prussia.
Vidar	Danzig	The ship was wrecked on the Nehrung, in the Baltic Sea. She was on a voyage from Danzig to Sunderland, County Durham.

== 7 October ==
List of shipwrecks: 7 October 1860
Ship	State	Description
Alnwick Packet	United Kingdom	The brigantine was wrecked on the Maasdroogen, in the North Sea off the coast of Zeeland, Netherlands. Her seven crew were rescued. She was on a voyage from Liverpool, Lancashire to Dordrecht, South Holland, Netherlands.
Aurora	United Kingdom	The schooner was lost on the coast of Labrador.
Betsey	United Kingdom	The brig was wrecked on the Haisborough Sands, in the North Sea off the coast of Norfolk. Her crew were rescued. She was on a voyage from Seaham, County Durham to Great Yarmouth, Norfolk.
Clunie	United Kingdom	The schooner was abandoned in the North Sea 100 nautical miles (190 km) off Girdleness, Aberdeenshire. Her crew were rescued by the schooner Leonor (Spain). Clunie was on a voyage from Sunderland, County Durham to Banff, Aberdeenshire.
Edmund Pear	United Kingdom	The ship was driven ashore at Ventava, Courland Governorate. Her seven crew survived. She was on a voyage from Wisbech, Cambridgeshire to a Baltic port.
Eliza	United Kingdom	The full-rigged ship was driven ashore on the Richibucto Cape, New Brunswick, British North America. Her 22 crew survived. She was on a voyage from Liverpool to Quebec City, Province of Canada, British North America.
Fanny	United Kingdom	The barque was driven ashore and wrecked on Hogland, Russia. Her ten crew were rescued. She was on a voyage from Kronstadt, Russia to Hartlepool, County Durham.
Fury	United Kingdom	The ship was driven ashore on Anholt, Denmark. She was on a voyage from Memel, Prussia to Belfast, County Antrim. She was refloated with assistance from the steamship Stirling (United Kingdom) and was towed in to Helsingør, Denmark.
Humming Bird	(United Kingdom of Great Britain and Ireland) British North America	The ship was wrecked off Anticosti Island, Nova Scotia with the loss of three of her crew. She was on a voyage from Labrador to Halifax, Nova Scotia.
Lord Clyde	United Kingdom	The full-rigged ship was abandoned off Cape Recife, Cape Colony. Her 31 crew were rescued by Don Quixote (United Kingdom) and she was set afire. Lord Clyde was on a voyage from Calcutta, India to London.
Mariner	United Kingdom	The ship was lost on the coast of Labrador, British North America.
Sarah	United Kingdom	The schooner was driven ashore on the coast of Jutland. Her seven crew survived. She was on a voyage from Fraserburgh, Aberdeenshire to Stettin.
Sicilian	United Kingdom	The barque was driven ashore at Richibucto, New Brunswick. She was on a voyage from Liverpool to Miramichi, New Brunswick. She was consequently condemned.
Speedy	United Kingdom	The schooner foundered in the North Sea. Her crew were rescued by the steamship Chester (United Kingdom). Speedy was on a voyage from Hartlepool, County Durham to Portsmouth, Hampshire.
Summer Hill	United Kingdom	The barque was abandoned in the Atlantic Ocean. Her seven crew were rescued by Helmuth and Marie ( Grand Duchy of Mecklenburg-Schwerin). Summer Hill was on a voyage from Belfast, County Antrim to Bathurst, New Brunswick.
Traveller	(United Kingdom of Great Britain and Ireland) British North America	The schooner was driven ashore at Buctouche, New Brunswick.

== 8 October ==
List of shipwrecks: 8 October 1860
Ship	State	Description
Agnes	United Kingdom	The ship was wrecked at Torekov, Sweden. She was on a voyage from London to Stettin.
Andrea Theodora	France	The ship was driven ashore on Saaremaa, Russia. She was on a voyage from Rouen, Seine-Inférieure to Kronstadt, Russia.
Anna Margaretha Christine	Prussia	The schooner was driven ashore near Kiel. She was on a voyage form Liverpool, Lancashire, United Kingdom to Kiel. She was refloated on 10 October and taken in to Kiel.
Carlisle	United Kingdom	The brig was wrecked on Borkum, Denmark with the loss of all seven crew. She was on a voyage from South Shields, County Durham to a Baltic port.
Clara	United Kingdom	The ship was wrecked off Hunseby, Denmark. Her crew were rescued. She was on a voyage from Danzig to London.
Engeline	United Kingdom	The schooner was wrecked at Melby, Denmark. Her crew were rescued. She was on a voyage from Narva, Russia to Hull, Yorkshire.
Flora Temple	United States	The ship was wrecked on a reef off the coast of French Cochinchina and was abandoned by her officers and crew. She subsequently sank with the loss of 850 lives. Flora Temple was on a voyage from Macao, China to Savannah, Georgia.
Friend of Africa	United Kingdom	The sloop was abandoned in the North Sea. Her three crew survived.
George and Maria	United Kingdom	The snow was driven ashore on the coast of Jutland. Her nine crew survived. She was on a voyage from Saint Petersburg, Russia to London.
Giles	United Kingdom	The ship sank. Her crew were rescued by Margaret (United Kingdom). Giles was on a voyage from Dunbeath, Caithness to Dublin.
Maria	France	The brig was driven ashore and wrecked at Melby. Her crew were rescued. She was on a voyage from Stettin to Paimbœuf, Loire-Inférieure.
Marie Alexandre	France	The schooner ran aground on the Holm Sand, in the North Sea off the coast of Suffolk, United Kingdom. She was on a voyage from Newcastle upon Tyne, Northumberland, United Kingdom to Nantes, Loire-Inférieure. She was refloated and resumed her voyage.
Marsden	United Kingdom	The brig was driven ashore at Nidden, Prussia. Her eleven crew survived. She was on a voyage from South Shields to a Baltic port. She was consequently condemned.
Norna	United Kingdom	The ship was driven ashore on Hiiumaa, Russia. She was on a voyage from Söderhamn, Sweden to London.
Rajah	United Kingdom	The barque was driven ashore and sank at "Wyburg". Her fifteen crew were rescued. She was on a voyage from Kronstadt to London.

== 9 October ==
List of shipwrecks: 9 October 1860
Ship	State	Description
Adolf von Lutzow	Rostock	The ship was abandoned in the Dogger Bank. Her crew were rescued. Adolf von Lutzow was on a voyage from Memel, Prussia to London, United Kingdom. She came ashore at Thisted, Denmark.
Aglae	France	The barque was wrecked on the Arabian coast 35 nautical miles (65 km) from Aden.
Ann Warhhurx	Sweden	The ship was driven ashore and wrecked on Öland. Her crew were rescued. She was on a voyage from Stockholm to New York, United States.
Carl England	Kingdom of Hanover	The ship was driven ashore and wrecked at Thisted, Denmark. She was on a voyage from an English port to Copenhagen, Denmark.
Cuba	United Kingdom	The ship ran aground at Whitby, Yorkshire. She was refloated with the assistance of a tug and beached at Collier's Hope.
Defiance	United Kingdom	The sloop was driven ashore and wrecked at Staithes, Yorkshire.
Druid	United Kingdom	The schooner was driven ashore at Bideford, Devon. All five people on board were rescued by the Appledore Lifeboat. She was on a voyage from Dublin to Barnstaple, Devon.
Friendship	United Kingdom	The sloop sank at Scarborough, Yorkshire. Her crew were rescued. She was on a voyage from Middlesbrough, Yorkshire to Southwold, Suffolk.
Gesina Alida	Prussia	The ship sank in the Dogger Bank. Her crew were rescued. She was on a voyage from Hartlepool, County Durham, United Kingdom to Königsberg.
Grammatteo	Flag unknown	The ship was sighted in The Downs whilst on a voyage from Alexandria, Egypt to Hull, Yorkshire. No further trace, presumed foundered with the loss of all hands.
Harmonie	Denmark	The ship was driven ashore at Thisted. She was on a voyage from Gothenburg, Sweden to Grimsby, Lincolnshire.
Helding	Sweden	The ship sank. Her crew were rescued. She was on a voyage from Riga, Russia to London.
James	United Kingdom	The schooner ran aground on the West Barrow Sand, in the North Sea off the coast of Essex. She was refloated with the assistance of three smacks.
Minna	Kingdom of Hanover	The ship was driven ashore at Thisted.
Sisters	United Kingdom	The schooner was abandoned in the North Sea. Her crew were rescued by the steamship Sir John Easthope (United Kingdom). Sisters was on a voyage from Sunderland, County Durham to Inverness. She was taken in to Christianssand, Norway in a derelict condition.

== 10 October ==
List of shipwrecks: 10 October 1860
Ship	State	Description
Amund Hellund	Norway	The schooner ran aground on the Haisborough Sands, in the North Sea off the coast of Norfolk, United Kingdom. She was on a voyage from London to Newcastle upon Tyne, Northumberland, United Kingdom. She was refloated and towed in to Great Yarmouth, Norfolk in a leaky condition.
Enterprise	United Kingdom	The ship collided with another vessel and sank off the coast of the United States.
Fame	United Kingdom	The schooner was abandoned in the North Sea. Her five crew were rescued by the schooner Eflisda (Denmark). Fame was on a voyage from Sunderland, County Durham to Dundee, Forfarshire.
George Douthwaite	United Kingdom	The barque ran aground on the Neckmansground, in the Baltic Sea and sank. Her thirteen crew were rescued. She was on a voyage from South Shields, County Durham to Kronstadt, Russia.
Rhoda	United Kingdom	The brig ran aground on the Haisborough Sands, in the North Sea off the coast of Norfolk. She was on a voyage from London to Whitby, Yorkshire. She was refloated and taken in to Harwich, Essex in a leaky condition.
San Lorenzo	Peruvian Navy	The frigate sank at Callao with the loss of about 150 lives. The full-rigged ship Goncola (United Kingdom) rescued 30 or 40 survivors.
Tiber	United Kingdom	The steamship was driven ashore at Holyhead, Anglesey. She was on a voyage from Alexandria, Egypt to Holyhead.

== 11 October ==
List of shipwrecks: 11 October 1860
Ship	State	Description
Ann	United Kingdom	The ship was driven ashore near Yarmouth, Isle of Wight.
Arabella	United Kingdom	The full-rigged ship was destroyed by fire at Constantinople, Ottoman Empire.
Baroness Tecco	Ottoman Empire	The steamship was damaged by fire at Constantinople.
Dauntless	United Kingdom	The lugger was run into off Winterton-on-Sea, Norfolk by Sarah (United Kingdom) and was abandoned. Her crew were rescued by Sarah. Dauntless was taken in to Great Yarmouth, Norfolk in a derelict condition.
Enterprise	United Kingdom	The brig was driven ashore at Ventava, Courland Governorate. Her nine crew survived. She was on a voyage from a Baltic port to King's Lynn, Norfolk.
Eveline	Malta	The ship was destroyed by fire at Constantinople.
Fabela	Malta	The ship was destroyed by fire at Constantinople.
Isabella	United Kingdom	The snow was destroyed by fire at Constantinople. Her ten crew survived. She was on her maiden voyage, from Blyth, Northumberland to Constantinople.
Other	Norway	The schooner was wrecked at Scheveningen, South Holland, Netherlands. Her crew were rescued. She was on a voyage from Kristiansand to Somme, France.
Prince Regent	United Kingdom	The ship foundered in the North Sea off Happisburgh, Norfolk. Her crew survived. She was on a voyage from Hartlepool, County Durham to Exeter, Devon.
Sarah Sain	United Kingdom	The schooner was severely damaged by fire at Constantinople.
Sir John Rennie	United Kingdom	The snow sprang a leak and was abandoned in the North Sea with the loss of two of her seven crew. Survivors were rescued by the schooner Emilie Felix (France). Sir John Rennie was on a voyage from Riga, Russia to an English port. She came ashore at Ringkøbing in a capsized condition.
Vesta	Ottoman Empire	The paddle steamer was destroyed by fire at Constantinople.
Unnamed	Ottoman Empire	Eleven ships, including a polacca, were destroyed by fire at Constantinople.
Unnamed	United States of the Ionian Islands	Two ships were destroyed by fire at Constantinople.
Unnamed	Greece	Two ships, one a brig, were destroyed by fire at Constantinople.
Unnamed	United Principalities	The tug was destroyed by fire at Constantinople.
Unnamed	Austrian Empire	A ship was destroyed by fire at Constantinople.

== 12 October ==
List of shipwrecks: 12 October 1860
Ship	State	Description
Aimée Desirée	France	The schooner was wrecked on the Oeste, off the Dutch coast. Her crew were rescued. She was on a voyage from a Norwegian port to Bordeaux, Gironde.
Anglesey	Norway	The ship was discovered derelict in the Baltic Sea by Emily (United Kingdom) and was beached on Fårö, Sweden. She was later refloated and taken in to Slitohamn for repairs.
Faithful	United Kingdom	The brig foundered in the Bristol Channel off Ilfracombe, Devon. Her eight crew survived. She was on a voyage from Cardiff, Glamorgan to Barcelona, Spain.
Francis Yeats	United Kingdom	The schooner was driven ashore and wrecked on Coll, Inner Hebrides with the loss of all eight crew.
Hans	Grand Duchy of Mecklenburg-Schwerin	The barque was wrecked in the Dardanelles. Her crew survived.
Jessy	United Kingdom	The ship put in to Stanley, Falkland Islands on fire. She was on a voyage from Cardiff to Valparaíso, Chile. The fire was extinguished, she was repaired and resumed her voyage on 22 November.
Malakoff	United Kingdom	The ship was driven ashore in Richmond Bay.
Nancy	United Kingdom	The brig was driven ashore in the Dardanelles. Her crew survived. She was on a voyage from Cardiff, Glamorgan to Odesa.
Remke	Netherlands	The galiot was wrecked near Petten, North Holland. She was on a voyage from Libava, Courland Governorate to Rotterdam, South Holland.
Thomas Hodgson	United Kingdom	The barque was driven ashore and wrecked at Lower Kildare, near Charlottetown, Prince Edward Island, British North America. Her eleven crew survived. She was on a voyage from Newcastle upon Tyne, Northumberland to Penang, Malaya. Although condemned and sold, she was refloated and taken in to Shediac, New Brunswick, British North America to load a cargo.

== 13 October ==
List of shipwrecks: 13 October 1860
Ship	State	Description
Ada	United Kingdom	The yacht was wrecked near Lytham St. Annes, Lancashire with loss of life.
Ann Jane	United Kingdom	The cutter was wrecked at New Harbour, British North America.
Ardnamurchan Packet	United Kingdom	The smack was driven ashore and wrecked at Tobermory, Isle of Mull.
Cesse Gordo	United States	The ship ran aground on the Loggerhead Shoal, off the Dry Tortugas. She was on a voyage from New Orleans, Louisiana to Queenstown, County Cork, United Kingdom. She was declared a total loss.
Eclipse	United Kingdom	The ship ran aground on the Outer Barber Sand, in the North Sea off the coast of Norfolk. She was on a voyage from Hartlepool, County Durham to Shoreham-by-Sea, Sussex. She was refloated the next day.
Elizabeth	United Kingdom	The smack was driven ashore and wrecked at Toberory.
Emile Marie	France	The ship was run into by a narwhal and was holed. She was on a voyage from Sunderland, County Durham to Bayonne, Basses-Pyrénées. She put in to Cherbourg, Seine-Inférieure.
Ensign	United Kingdom	The brig capsized off Christiansø, Denmark.
Mermaid	United Kingdom	The brig was driven ashore and wrecked at Tenedos, Ottoman Empire. She was on a voyage from London to Constantinople, Ottoman Empire.
New Astley	United Kingdom	The brig was wrecked at Lydd, Kent. Her crew were rescued. She was on a voyage from Sunderland, County Durham to Lydd.

== 14 October ==
List of shipwrecks: 14 October 1860
Ship	State	Description
Amicitia	Denmark	The schooner brig was abandoned in the Mediterranean Sea 40 leagues (120 nautical miles (220 km)) off Marseille, Bouches-du-Rhône, France. Her crew were rescued by the steamship Ville de Bône (France). Amicitia was on a voyage from Barcelona, Spain to Marseille.
Echo	United Kingdom	The full-rigged ship was driven ashore between Dognose Point and Corkbeg Island, County Cork. She was on a voyage from Akyab, Burma to Liverpool, Lancashire. She was refloated.
Egyptian Witch	United Kingdom	The ship put in to Saint Helena in a leaky condition. She was on a voyage from Madras, India to Liverpool. She was deemed beyond repair.
Jeune Honore	France	The schooner was in collision with an Austrian vessel and foundered in the Bristol Channel off Lavernock Point, Glamorgan, United Kingdom. Her crew were rescued.
Lady Sale, and Lesmahagow	United Kingdom	The full-rigged ship Lady Sale and the brig Lesmahagow broke from their moorings at Fleetwood, Lancashire. They collided with the full-rigged ship Bellcarrig (United Kingdom) and then drove onto the Sleef Brest. Both vessels were refloated.
Riga and Oporto	Russia	The schooner ran aground at Ventspils. She was on a voyage from Riga to London, United Kingdom. She was refloated.
Zillah	United Kingdom	The ship ran aground on the Whitburn Rock, on the coast of County Durham. She was on a voyage from South Shields, County Durham to Genoa, Kingdom of Sardinia. She was refloated with assistance from three tugs and towed in to South Shields.

== 15 October ==
List of shipwrecks: 15 October 1860
Ship	State	Description
Derwent	United Kingdom	The steamship was driven ashore and damaged near Cádiz, Spain. She was refloated.
Diton	(United Kingdom of Great Britain and Ireland) British North America	The schooner was driven ashore at Caraquet, New Brunswick.
Elise	United Kingdom	The brigantine collided with Nova Bella (United Kingdom) off Point Lynas, Anglesey and was abandoned. Her eight crew were rescued by Nova Bella. Elise was on a voyage from Liverpool, Lancashire to Africa. She was presumed to have consequently sunk.
Elzia	United Kingdom	The ship was driven ashore near Richibucto, New Brunswick. She was on a voyage from Liverpool, Lancashire to Dalhousie, New Brunswick.
Elizabeth	United Kingdom	The brig was driven ashore at Domsten, Sweden. She was on a voyage from Kronstadt, Russia to London. She was refloated the next day and resumed her voyage.
Granada	United States	The steamship was lost at San Francisco, California. She was on a voyage from New York to San Francisco.
Grange	United Kingdom	The brig was wrecked on the Corton Sand, in the North Sea off the coast of Suffolk. Her crew were rescued. She was on a voyage from Hartlepool, County Durham to London.
Letitia	United Kingdom	The schooner was wrecked on the Newcombe Sand, in the North Sea off the coast of Suffolk. Her five crew survived. She was on a voyage from Seaham, County Durham to Ipswich, Suffolk.
Louisa Marion	United Kingdom	The barque ran aground on the Florida Reef and was wrecked. Her thirteen crew survived. She was on a voyage from Belize City, British Honduras to Queenstown, County Cork. She was refloated on 16 October and taken in to Key West, Florida, United States in a leaky condition. she was consequently condemned.
Nelson	United Kingdom	The brig was driven ashore at Montevideo, Uruguay. Her eight crew survived. She was on a voyage from Cádiz, Spain to Montevideo.

== 16 October ==
List of shipwrecks: 16 October 1860
Ship	State	Description
Belcar	United Kingdom	The brig ran aground and was severely damaged at Fleetwood, Lancashire.
Foaming Billow	United States	The schooner was wrecked on Prince Edward Island, British North America with the loss of all hands.
Gazelle	United Kingdom	The schooner was lost at Sydney, New South Wales. She was on a voyage from Newcastle, New South Wales to Sydney.
Pandora	Sweden	The brig was wrecked near Lemvig, Denmark. She was on a voyage from London, United Kingdom to Stockholm.
Speculation	United Kingdom	The barque was lost at Petchora Russia with the loss of one of her ten crew.
Star	United Kingdom	The brig was driven ashore at Hauxley, Northumberland. She was refloated the next day and taken in to Warkworth, Northumberland in a leaky condition. She was on a voyage from London to Sunderland, County Durham.

== 17 October ==
List of shipwrecks: 17 October 1860
Ship	State	Description
Alexander	United Kingdom	The ship was wrecked on Saaremaa, Russia. She was on a voyage from Saint Petersburg, Russia to Kiel, Prussia.
Arctic	United States	The ship was wrecked in Silver Bay, Bahamas. She was on a voyage from Nassau, Bahamas to New York.
Cascade	United Kingdom	The brig was wrecked at "Laguna". Her crew were rescued. She was on a voyage from Aspinwall, Granadine Confederation to "Laguna".
Hannah	United Kingdom	The ship was wrecked on Süderoog, Duchy of Holstein with the loss of at least four lives.
Sarah Benus	United States	The ship was wrecked on the Man of War Key. Her crew were rescued by the schooner Heigh W. Fry (United States).
Sophia Ray	United Kingdom	The schooner was abandoned in the South China Sea 400 nautical miles (740 km) east of Formosa. She was on a voyage from "Appia", South Sea Islands to Shanghai, China.
Stag	United Kingdom	The schooner was wrecked at the mouth of the Macleay River. She was on a voyage from Sydney, New South Wales to the Macleay River.
Tawol	Danzig	The ship was run down and sunk by Marie ( Stralsund). She was on a voyage from Danzig to London, United Kingdom.
Valiant	United Kingdom	The brig foundered in the North Sea 20 nautical miles (37 km) off the mouth of the Humber with the loss of seven of her eight crew. The survivor was rescued by a schooner. She was on a voyage from the Humber to the Nieuw Diep.

== 18 October ==
List of shipwrecks: 18 October 1860
Ship	State	Description
Conquering Hero	United Kingdom	The snow was abandoned in the North Sea. Her ten crew were rescued by a Norwegian vessel.
Flying Cloud	(United Kingdom of Great Britain and Ireland) Guernsey	The schooner ran aground at Patras, Greece. She was refloated on 27 October and taken in to Zakynthos, United States of the Ionian Islands.
Martha Whitemore	United States	The ship was driven ashore in Dundrum Bay. She was on a voyage from New York to the Clyde.
Norma	United Kingdom	The barque ran aground on the Barnard Sand, in the North Sea off the coast of Suffolk. She was refloated and resumed her voyage.
Salvator	Stettin	The brig foundered off Jersey, Channel Islands. She was on a voyage from Saint-Malo, Ille-et-Vilaine, France to Sunderland, County Durham, United Kingdom.

== 19 October ==
List of shipwrecks: 19 October 1860
Ship	State	Description
Bosphorus	United Kingdom	The barque was driven ashore and wrecked on Cape Hollanders, Cuba. She was on a voyage from British Honduras to a British port.
Cygnet	United Kingdom	The steamship struck a sunken rock in the Crinan Canal between Ardrishaig and Lochgilphead, Argyllshire and sank. She was on a voyage from Glasgow, Renfrewshire to Inverness. She was refloated and taken in to Ardrishaig.
Henriette	Prussia	The ship was driven ashore near "Trelletoy", Denmark. She was on a voyage from Memel to Grangemouth, Stirlingshire, United Kingdom.
Mary	United Kingdom	The barque was wrecked at Cape North, Nova Scotia, British North America with the loss of nine of her crew. She was on a voyage from London to Quebec City, Province of Canada, British North America.
Napoleon	(United Kingdom of Great Britain and Ireland)	The paddle steamer ran aground in the Saint Lawrence River and was damaged. She was on a voyage from Montreal to Quebec City, Province of Canada. She was later refloated.
Victoria	United Kingdom	The schooner ran aground on the Gunfleet Sand, in the North Sea off the coast of Essex. She was on a voyage from Aberdeen to London. She was refloated with the assistance of three smacks and taken in to Wivenhoe, Essex.

== 20 October ==
List of shipwrecks: 20 October 1860
Ship	State	Description
Dove	(United Kingdom of Great Britain and Ireland) British North America	The brigantine was driven ashore at Indian Tickle, Labrador.
Jane	United Kingdom	The schooner was abandoned in the North Sea. Her crew were rescued. She was on a voyage from Sunderland, County Durham to Lybster, Caithness.
Maria	United Kingdom	The schooner foundered in the North Sea off Flamborough Head, Yorkshire. Her crew were rescued by Pomona (United Kingdom). Maria was on a voyage from West Hartlepool, County Durham to King's Lynn, Norfolk.
Olive	United Kingdom	The schooner sank off Samos, Greece. Her seven crew survived. She was on a voyage from Kuşadası, Ottoman Empire to Queenstown, County Cork.
Thomas and Hannah	United Kingdom	The snow foundered in the North Sea with the loss of all seven crew. She was on a voyage from Sunderland to the Nieuw Diep.
Vermont	(United Kingdom of Great Britain and Ireland) British North America	The barque was wrecked on Barnett's Bank, in the Irish Sea off the coast of Lancashire. All sixteen people on board were rescued by the Fleetwood Lifeboat. She was on a voyage from Dalhousie, New Brunswick to Fleetwood, Lancashire. She was refloated on 29 October and taken in to Fleetwood.

== 21 October ==
List of shipwrecks: 21 October 1860
Ship	State	Description
Henderika	Flag unknown	The koff ran aground off "Thorne", Denmark and was wrecked. She was on a voyage from Newcastle upon Tyne, Northumberland, United Kingdom to Danzig.
Horsford	United Kingdom	The schooner was wrecked near Lemvig, Denmark. Her seven crew were rescued. She was on a voyage from Bremen to North Shields, County Durham.
James Freeman	United Kingdom	The brig was wrecked near Lemvig. Her nine crew were rescued. She was on a voyage from Hamburg to Newcastle upon Tyne.
James Pratt	United Kingdom	The schooner was wrecked off "Pellinge", Grand Duchy of Finland.
HMS Perseverance	Royal Navy	The troopship was wrecked on Maio, Cape Verde Islands. All on board, more than 600 people, were rescued.
Sabrina	United Kingdom	The ship departed from New York, United States for Cork. No further trace, presumed foundered with the loss of all hands.

== 22 October ==
List of shipwrecks: 22 October 1860
Ship	State	Description
Anna	Flag unknown	The ship was driven ashore near Noordwijk, South Holland, Netherlands.
Beurs von Groningen	Netherlands	The ship sank off the Kohl, in the Baltic Sea. Her crew were rescued. She was on a voyage from Newcastle upon Tyne, Northumberland, United Kingdom to Helsingborg, Sweden.
Frances Yates	United Kingdom	The ship was wrecked on the Isle of Coll, Inner Hebrides with the loss of all hands.
Grunus	Netherlands	The ship foundered off Cape São Roque, Brazil. She was on a voyage from London, United Kingdom to Pernambuco, Brazil.
Henderika	Netherlands	The koff was driven ashore and wrecked near Thornby, Denmark. Her crew were rescued by the Hirtshals Lifeboat. She was on a voyage from Newcastle upon Tyne, Northumberland, United Kingdom to Danzig.
Lady of Mugdrum	United Kingdom	The schooner was lost in the Baltic Sea with the loss of all five crew. She was on a voyage from Kronstadt, Russia to Helsingør, Denmark.
Swift	United Kingdom	The schooner foundered in the Atlantic Ocean. Her six crew were rescued. She was on a voyage from Pomaron, Portugal to Liverpool, Lancashire.

== 23 October ==
List of shipwrecks: 23 October 1860
Ship	State	Description
Angeline	France	The schooner ran aground on the Newcombe Sand, in the North Sea off the coast of Suffolk, United Kingdom. She was on a voyage from Blyth, Northumberland, United Kingdom to a French port. She was refloated and resumed her voyage.
Anna	Prussia	The barque was abandoned in the North Sea 20 nautical miles (37 km) off Hellevoetsluis, Zeeland, Netherlands. Her crew survived.
Betsey Rowe	United Kingdom	The schooner was driven ashore and wrecked at Lamorna, Cornwall. Her crew were rescued. She was on a voyage from Penzance, Cornwall to Newport, Monmouthshire.
Dart	United Kingdom	The schooner was wrecked in the Bay of Plenty.
Doctor	United Kingdom	The ship ran aground on the Burbo Bank, in Liverpool Bay. She was on a voyage from Liverpool, Lancashire to Newcastle upon Tyne, Northumberland. She was refloated and resumed her voyage.
Lisa	United Kingdom	The schooner ran aground at Risør, Norway. She was on a voyage from Riga, Russia to London. She was refloated in a waterlogged condition.
Nemesis	United Kingdom	The barque ran aground on the Girdler Sand, off the Kent coast. She was on a voyage from London to Bombay, India. She was refloated the next day with the assistance of the Margate Lifeboat and put back to Gravesend, Kent.
Oregon	United Kingdom	The ship ran aground on the Burbo Bank. She was on a voyage from Liverpool to Dordrecht, South Holland, Netherlands. She was refloated and resumed her voyage.
Resolution	United Kingdom	The ship was wrecked at "Wakatene".
Salaberry	United Kingdom	The ship was driven ashore on Spiekeroog, Groningen, Netherlands. She was on a voyage from Hamburg to Cardiff, Glamorgan.

== 24 October ==
List of shipwrecks: 24 October 1860
Ship	State	Description
Ark	United Kingdom	The ship ran aground on the Sow and Pigs Rocks, off the coast of Northumberland. She was on a voyage from Riga, Russia to Stockton-on-Tees, County Durham. She was refloated and towed in to Stockton-on-Tees.
Ella Gladstone	United Kingdom	The brig was driven ashore west of St. James's Castle, Smyrna, Ottoman Empire. She was on a voyage from Liverpool, Lancashire to Venice, Kingdom of Lombardy–Venetia. She was refloated on 29 October with assistance from Terrible (Royal Navy) and taken in to Smyrna.
Frederick	Kingdom of Hanover	The schooner was wrecked on Læsø, Denmark. She was on a voyage from Bremen to Stettin.
Island	United Kingdom	The sloop collided with the brig Plantagenet (United Kingdom and sank in the Bristol Channel off Combe Martin, Devon with the loss of one of her three crew. Survivors were rescued by Plantagenet. Island was on a voyage from Cork to Newport, Monmouthshire.
Jupiter	United Kingdom	The ship sank off Flekkerøy, Norway. She was on a voyage from Riga, Russia to Hull, Yorkshire.
Ocean Star	United States	The ship ran aground on the Triumph Reef, off the coast of Florida. She was on a voyage form New Orleans, Louisiana to Liverpool. She was later refloated and taken in to Key West, Florida in a severely leaky condition.
Yougheden	Norway	The ship foundered in the North Sea. Her crew were rescued. She was on a voyage from Drammen to Montrose, Forfarshire, United Kingdom.

== 25 October ==
List of shipwrecks: 25 October 1860
Ship	State	Description
Eliza	United Kingdom	The brig ran aground at the mouth of the Rio Grande. She was on a voyage from the Rio Grande to Liverpool, Lancashire. She was refloated and found to be in a sinking condition and was consequently beached.
Hebe	United Kingdom	The brig was driven ashore and wrecked on Skagen, Denmark. She was on a voyage from Gävle, Sweden to Hull, Yorkshire.
José Maria	Spain	The brig collided with Palm (United Kingdom) and foundered in the English Channel off Dungeness, Kent, United Kingdom. Her crew were rescued. She was on a voyage from Antwerp, Belgium to Santander and Bilbao.
Thetis	United Kingdom	The brig ran aground on the Kelder Steel, in the North Sea off the coast of Yorkshire. She was on a voyage from Hartlepool, County Durham to Dieppe, Seine-Inférieure, France. She was refloated with assistance from the tug Esk (United Kingdom) and towed in to Whitby, Yorkshire.

== 26 October ==
List of shipwrecks: 26 October 1860
Ship	State	Description
Cherub	United Kingdom	The ship driven ashore and wrecked in Sligo Bay. Her crew were rescued.
Content	United Kingdom	The brig was driven ashore at Dragør, Denmark. She was on a voyage from "Wyborg" to Great Yarmouth, Norfolk. She was refloated on 28 November and taken in to Copenhagen, Denmark.
Lesa	Russia	The schooner struck a submerged object and became waterlogged. She was on a voyage from Riga to London, United Kingdom. She was taken into a port near Risør.
Margarethe	Duchy of Holstein	The yacht was driven ashore at Hals, Denmark. She was on a voyage from Neustadt in Holstein to an English port. She was refloated on 29 October.
Sirius	United Kingdom	The schooner was driven ashore at Hals. She was on a voyage from Stettin to Montrose, Forfarshire.
Thetis	United Kingdom	The ship was driven ashore north of Whitby, Yorkshire. She was on a voyage from West Hartlepool, County Durham to London. She was refloated the next day and taken in to Whitby in a leaky condition.
William Keith	United Kingdom	The schooner was driven ashore at Barmouth, Merionethshire. Two people were taken off by the Barmouth Lifeboat, her crew remaining on board. She was later refloated.
Windsor Castle	United Kingdom	The ship was driven ashore and wrecked on Sanda Island, Argyllshire. She was on a voyage from Greenock, Renfrewshire to Calcutta, India.

== 27 October ==
List of shipwrecks: 27 October 1860
Ship	State	Description
Emu	(United Kingdom of Great Britain and Ireland) New Zealand	The paddle steamer was wrecked on Motutapu Island. All on board were rescued by HMS Iris (Royal Navy).
London	United Kingdom	The barque ran ashore on the Jasmund peninsula, Grand Duchy of Mecklenburg-Schwerin. Her crew were rescued. She was on a voyage from Danzig to an English port. London was refloated on 30 October and taken in to Copenhagen, Denmark in a leaky condition.
Resolute	United Kingdom	The steamship ran ashore between Sheringham and Weybourne, Norfolk. She was on a voyage from Goole, Yorkshire to London.
Vancouver	United Kingdom	The ship was driven ashore at the Santa Anna Lighthouse, Brazil. She was on a voyage from Liverpool, Lancashire to Maranhão, Brazil.

== 28 October ==
List of shipwrecks: 28 October 1860
Ship	State	Description
Almira, and Beaver	United Kingdom (United Kingdom of Great Britain and Ireland) British North America	The tug Beaver and the ship Almira ran agoround on the Jaques Cartin Square, in the Saint Lawrence River. Almira was under tow from Beaver. She was on a voyage from Montreal, Province of Canada, British North America to Liverpool, Lancashire.
Anna	Kingdom of Hanover	The koff was driven ashore and wrecked on Læsø, Denmark.
Banshee	(United Kingdom of Great Britain and Ireland) British North America	The barque was wrecked on Cape Sable Island, Nova Scotia. She was on a voyage from Fall River, Massachusetts, United States to Pictou, Nova Scotia.
Christian Benjamin	United Kingdom	The ship was driven ashore at Trelleborg, Sweden. She was on a voyage from Danzig to London. She was refloated on 30 October and taken in to Copenhagen, Denmark.
Windsor Castle	United Kingdom	The paddle steamer ran ashore on Glunimore Island, Argyllshire and was wrecked. She was on a voyage from Greenock, Renfrewshire to Calcutta, Indis.

== 29 October ==
List of shipwrecks: 29 October 1860
Ship	State	Description
Fanny	United Kingdom	The ship was driven ashore and wrecked at Tabusintac, New Brunswick, British North America. Her twelve crew survived. She was on a voyage from Miramichi, New Brunswick to Belfast, County Antrim.
Norge	Norway	The barque ran aground off Dragør, Denmark and was severely damaged. She was on a voyage from the Gulf of Bothnia to London, United Kingdom. She was refloated on 3 November and taken in to Helsingør, Denmark in a leaky condition.

== 30 October ==
List of shipwrecks: 330 October 1860
Ship	State	Description
Agnes	United Kingdom	The schooner was wrecked in the Farne Islands, Northumberland. Her crew were rescued. She was on a voyage from Wick, Caithness to Newcastle upon Tyne, Northumberland.
Eliza	United Kingdom	The smack sank 30 nautical miles (56 km) off "Llanddroyn", Caernarfonshire. Her crew were rescued.
Macaw	United Kingdom	The Yorkshire Billyboy ran aground on the Patch Sand, in the North Sea off the coast of Norfolk. She was on a voyage from Maldon, Essex to Goole, Yorkshire. She was refloated.
North Briton	United Kingdom	The steamship was driven ashore in Ballycastle Bay. She was refloated and sailed to Liverpool.
Saint Felix	France	The steamship was driven ashore on Lemnos, Greece. She was refloated on 14 November.
Skiold	Stettin	The schooner ran aground on the Droogden, in the Baltic Sea. She was on a voyage from Stettin to London, United Kingdom.

== 31 October ==
List of shipwrecks: 31 October 1860
Ship	State	Description
Cicely	United Kingdom	The brig sprang a leak and foundered in the Atlantic Ocean (40°00′N 11°13′W). Her crew were rescued by the full-rigged ship Britannia (United Kingdom). Cicely was on a voyage from Tavira, Portugal to Torbay, Devon.
Dina	United Kingdom	The brig ran aground on the Inner Shoal, in the North Sea off the coast of Suffolk. She was refloated.
Elizabeth	Netherlands	The koff ran aground near Weddewarden. She was on a voyage from Newcastle upon Tyne, Northumberland, United Kingdom to Bremen. She was refloated on 2 November and taken in to Bremerhaven.
Louise	France	The sloop ran aground on the Goodwin Sands, Kent, United Kingdom. She was on a voyage from a French port to Seaham, County Durham, United Kingdom. She was refloated and resumed her voyage.
Monkton	United Kingdom	The schooner ran aground on the Arklow Bank, in the Irish Sea off the coast of County Wicklow and was abandoned by her crew. She was on a voyage from Liverpool, Lancashire to Wicklow. She floated off, and was subsequently towed in to Milford Haven, Pembrokeshire.
Providence	France	The ship was 20 leagues (60 nautical miles (110 km) north of Ystad Sweden. Her crew were rescued. She was on a voyage from Kronstadt, Russia to London, United Kingdom.

== Unknown date ==
List of shipwrecks: Unknown date in October 1860
Ship	State	Description
Alchymist	United Kingdom	The ship was driven ashore at Helsingør, Denmark between 3 and 5 October. She was on a voyage from Newcastle upon Tyne, Northumberland to Kronstadt, Russia.
Amor	Stettin	The schooner was wrecked near "Furneby" with the loss of one of her eight crew. She was on a voyage from Saint Petersburg, Russia to London.
Archangel Michael	Russia	The ship was driven ashore near Narva between 3 and 5 October.
Barend	Netherlands	The ship was wrecked at Skive between 3 and 5 October.
Bolivia	United Kingdom	The ship was wrecked near Helsingborg, Sweden before 12 October. She was on a voyage from Svartvik, Sweden to West Hartlepool, County Durham.
Caroline	Sweden	The ship was driven ashore at Ventava, Courland Governorate before 9 October.
Caroline Schenck	Flag unknown	The ship was lost near "Pitty Harbor, Motton" before 23 October.
Christine	United Kingdom	The ship was driven ashore before 23 October.
Daniel Jeffreys	United Kingdom	The brig was wrecked in Netherlands East Indies waters before 4 October.
Dygden	United Kingdom	The ship was abandoned in the Baltic Sea off Saaremaa before 23 October.
Emily	United Kingdom	The barque ran aground on the Filsand, in the Baltic Sea before 14 October. She was on a voyage from Oulu, Grand Duchy of Finland to London. She was refloated and taken in to Slitohamn, Sweden for repairs.
Emmanuel	Netherlands	The ship was wrecked at Skive between 3 and 5 October.
Erland	Norway	The ship was abandoned in the Baltic Sea before 16 October. Her crew were rescued by Scottish Maid (United Kingdom). Erland was on a voyage from Gävle, Sweden to Dover, Kent, United Kingdom.
Eugene and Pauline	France	The ship was driven ashore at Thisted between 3 and 5 October.
Familien	Sweden	The ship was wrecked at Kungsbacka. She was on a voyage from Amsterdam, North Holland, Netherlands to Visby.
Fransica	Prussia	The ship was wrecked near Helsingborg, Sweden between 3 and 5 October. Her crew were rescued. She was on a voyage from Memel to King's Lynn, Norfolk, United Kingdom.
Fraternity	United Kingdom	The ship sank before 23 October.
Gulnare	(United Kingdom of Great Britain and Ireland) British North America	The schooner was abandoned in the Atlantic Ocean. She was towed in to Dundalk, County Louth on 20 October in a derelict condition.
Harmonie	Sweden	The ship was driven ashore at Helsingør between 3 and 5 October. She was on a voyage from Sundsvall to Douglas, Isle of Man.
Henriette Kleist	Flag unknown	The ship was driven ashore at Helsingør between 3 and 5 October.
Lydia	United Kingdom	The ship was abandoned in the North Sea before 18 October.
Kingston	United Kingdom	The schooner was wrecked at Penarth Head, Glamorgan, Wales. Her six crew were rescued.
Kron Prins Frederik	Norway	The ship was wrecked at Skive between 3 and 5 October.
Louise	Prussia	The ship was driven ashore at Thisted between 3 and 5 October.
Ludovico	Prussia	The ship was wrecked near Helsingborg between 3 and 5 October. Her crew were rescued. She was on a voyage from the River Tyne to Memel.
Maggie Walker	United Kingdom	The ship was abandoned in the Irish Sea. Her crew were rescued by Otillia (United Kingdom). Maggie Walker was on a voyage from Liverpool to Sierra Leone.
Margaretha	Flag unknown	The ship was wrecked at Skive between 3 and 5 October.
Maria	Sweden	The ship was wrecked at Skive between 3 and 5 October.
Mary	United Kingdom	The ship was wrecked at Cape North, Nova Scotia before 12 October with the loss of nine of her crew. She was on a voyage from London Quebec City, Province of Canada, British North America.
Melckma	Netherlands	The ship was driven ashore at Thisted between 3 and 5 October.
Meteor	France	The ship was wrecked at San Francisco, California, United States before 17 October. She was on a voyage from Bordeaux, Gironde to San Francisco.
Minerva	Russia	The barque was driven ashore at Ventava before 9 October.
Minstrel Boy	United Kingdom	The ship was driven ashore at Helsingør between 3 and 5 October.
Pauline	France	The ship was driven ashore at Thisted between 3 and 5 October.
Nymph	United Kingdom	The schooner was abandoned in the North Sea before 12 October.
Odessa	United Kingdom	The steamship was driven ashore on the Spanish coast.
Pajaro del Oceano	Spain	The steamship was driven ashore at San Juan, Puerto Rico. She was refloated with assistance from the steamship Cuba (Spain) and taken in to Saint Thomas, Virgin Islands, where she arrived on 12 October.
Paline	United Kingdom	The ship was driven ashore and wrecked at Thisted between 4 and 6 October. Her crew were rescued. She was on a voyage from Sunderland, County Durham to Stettin.
Paul Ernst	France	The ship was wrecked on the Banks of Sand Pourre, off the African coast. Her crew survived. She was on a voyage from Liverpool to the Rio Pengo.
Phædo	United Kingdom	The brig was lost in the Baltic Sea with the loss of seven of her nine crew.
Pomona	Prussia	The ship ran aground in the Baltic Sea. She was on a voyage from Oulu, Grand Duchy of Finland to Halifax, Nova Scotia. She was refloated and put in to Copenhagen, Denmark for repairs, arriving on 17 October.
Pride of the Isles	United Kingdom	The ship was wrecked before 23 October.
Sardinia	United Kingdom	The ship ran aground off Bermuda. She was on a voyage from Liverpool to Savannah, Georgia, United States. She was refloated, resuming her voyage on 25 October.
Tiberius	United Kingdom	The brig was wrecked on Borkum between 3 and 5 October with the loss of all hands.
Travail	France	The ship was driven ashore at Thisted between 3 and 5 October.
Union	United Kingdom	The ship was driven ashore and wrecked at Thisted between 4 and 6 October with the loss of a crew member.
Viscount Lambton	United Kingdom	The steamship was presumed to have foundered in the Baltic Sea with the loss of all sixteen crew and her passengers. A boat came ashore at Wyk auf Föhr, Duchy of Holstein. She was on a voyage from Sunderland to Hamburg.
Water Kelpie	United Kingdom	The ship was wrecked at Kungsbacka between 3 and 5 October. Her crew were rescued. She was refloated on 12 October with the assistance of a steamship and towed in to Gothenburg, Sweden, where she was repaired.
Widar	Flag unknown	The ship was driven ashore at "Prœbbernan" between 3 and 5 October.
Wittus	United Kingdom	The ship was driven ashore before 23 October whilst bound for Odesa.
Unnamed	Prussia	The schooner was driven ashore near Libava, Courland Governorate between 3 and 5 October with the loss of all hands.
Unnamed	Flags unknown	Two ships were driven ashore near Lipeāja between 3 and 5 October with the loss of all hands.
Unnamed	Flag unknown	The schooner foundered in the Cattegat between 3 and 5 October with the loss of all hands.
