= Påarps GIF =

Swedish football club

- Full name: Påarps Gymnastik-och Idrottsförening
- Nickname: PGIF
- Founded: 1931
- Ground: Medevi IP; Påarp; Sweden
- Chairman: Sten Billqvist
- Head coach: Kim Walfridsson
- Coach: Thomas Hasselgren; Mathias Nilsson
- League: Division 3 Sydvästra Götaland
- 2010: Division 3 Sydvästra Götaland, 8th
Home colours	Away colours

Påarps GIF is a former Swedish football club located in Påarp in Helsingborg Municipality, Skåne County.

== Background ==
Påarps Gymnastik-och Idrottsförening were founded on 20 February 1931 by John Dahl, Thure Persson, Axel Lindh, Hjalmar Cronkvist and William Lund. On 19 August 1932, a football field was opened at Haga, next to the Flybjärs funfair. Activities at the time included football, gymnastics, table tennis, ladies handball and skiing. Today the club concentrates on football and bandy. PGIF's facilities include Medevi playing field (opened in 1949), a clubhouse, kitchen, office, dressing rooms and storage areas.

The most famous player to emerge from the club's youth ranks is Andreas Granqvist who has played for Helsingborgs IF, Wigan Athletic and currently FC Groningen in the Netherlands. It is also the boyhood club of Jonas Dahlgren, who would go on to play in Allsvenskan for Halmstads BK, Helsingborgs IF, and Trelleborgs FF.

Since their foundation Påarps GIF has participated mainly in the middle and lower divisions of the Swedish football league system. The club currently plays in Division 3 Sydvästra Götaland which is the fifth tier of Swedish football. They play their home matches at the Medevi IP in Påarp.

Påarps GIF are affiliated to Riksidrottsförbundet, Svenska Fotbollförbundet and Skånes Fotbollförbund.

== Recent history ==
In recent seasons Påarps GIF have competed in the following divisions:

2011 – Division III, Sydvästra Götaland
2010 – Division III, Sydvästra Götaland
2009 – Division III, Sydvästra Götaland
2008 – Division IV, Skåne Norra
2007 – Division III, Sydvästra Götaland
2006 – Division II, Södra Götaland
2005 – Division III, Sydvästra Götaland
2004 – Division III, Södra Götaland
2003 – Division III, Södra Götaland
2002 – Division IV, Skåne Västra
2001 – Division IV, Skåne Nordvästra
2000 – Division V, Skåne Västra
1999 – Division V, Skåne Nordvästra

== Attendances ==
In recent seasons Påarps GIF have had the following average attendances:

Season	Average attendance	Division / Section	Level
2005	171	Div 3 Sydvästra Götaland	Tier 4
2006	127	Div 2 Södra Götaland	Tier 4
2007	123	Div 3 Sydvästra Götaland	Tier 5
2008	Not available	Div 4 Skåne Norra	Tier 6
2009	125	Div 3 Sydvästra Götaland	Tier 5
2010	85	Div 3 Sydvästra Götaland	Tier 5

* Attendances are provided in the Publikliga sections of the Svenska Fotbollförbundet website.
