= Andreas Granqvist =

Swedish footballer (born 1985)

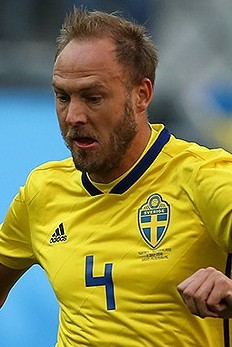
- Granqvist playing for Sweden at the 2018 FIFA World Cup

Personal information
- Full name: Andreas Granqvist
- Date of birth: 16 April 1985 (age 41)
- Place of birth: Påarp, Sweden
- Height: 1.92 m (6 ft 4 in)
- Position: Centre-back

Team information
- Current team: Trelleborgs FF (head coach)

Youth career
- –1999: Påarps GIF
- 1999–2003: Helsingborgs IF

Senior career*
Years	Team	Apps	(Gls)
2004–2007	Helsingborgs IF	72	(1)
2007	→ Wigan Athletic (loan)	0	(0)
2007–2008	Wigan Athletic	14	(0)
2008	→ Helsingborgs IF (loan)	11	(1)
2008–2011	Groningen	96	(21)
2011–2013	Genoa	63	(2)
2013–2018	Krasnodar	134	(3)
2018–2021	Helsingborgs IF	43	(2)
Total		433	(30)

International career
2004–2006	Sweden U21	26	(0)
2006–2019	Sweden	88	(9)

Managerial career
- 2024–2025: Ängelholms FF
- 2026–: Trelleborgs FF
- * Club domestic league appearances and goals

Andreas Granqvist (Swedish pronunciation: [anˈdrêːas ˈgrɑ̂ːnkvɪst]; born 16 April 1985) is a Swedish former professional footballer who played as a centre-back.

Starting his career with Helsingborgs IF in the mid-2000s, he went on to play for several different clubs in various countries, such as England, the Netherlands, Italy, and Russia before retiring at hometown club Helsingborg in 2021.

A full international between 2006 and 2021, he won 88 caps for the Sweden national team and represented his country at four different UEFA European Championships as well as the 2018 FIFA World Cup. He captained the national team between 2016 and 2021. However, due to injuries, he played his last international match in 2019.

He was awarded Guldbollen (the Golden Ball), given to the Swedish player of the year, in 2017.

== Club career ==
Born in Påarp, Sweden, Granqvist started his career with his local club, Påarps GIF. He later transferred to Helsingborgs IF and he made his debut in Allsvenskan, 2004. Two years later as team captain, the club won its third Swedish Cup title, defeating Gefle IF, 2–0. Others on the victorious Helsingborg side were Swedish internationals Henrik Larsson and Andreas Jakobsson as well as former Hibernian goalkeeper Daniel Andersson.

In January 2007, he completed a loan move to Wigan Athletic with a view to a permanent deal in the summer. On 19 June 2007, he signed a two-year deal with Wigan, for a fee reported to be around £750,000. On 12 March 2008, he returned to Helsingborg on a loan deal until the end of the English season in June.

On 9 July 2008, Granqvist signed a four-year contract with Dutch club, Groningen, with Wigan receiving a fee of around £600,000. On 13 September 2008, he scored after a 65-metre solo run, a remarkable feat, which he again managed to accomplish in the last match of the regular season on 10 May 2009.

On 15 June 2011, Groningen sold Granqvist to Genoa for €2 million. The Swedish international has signed a four-year contract with the Italian club.

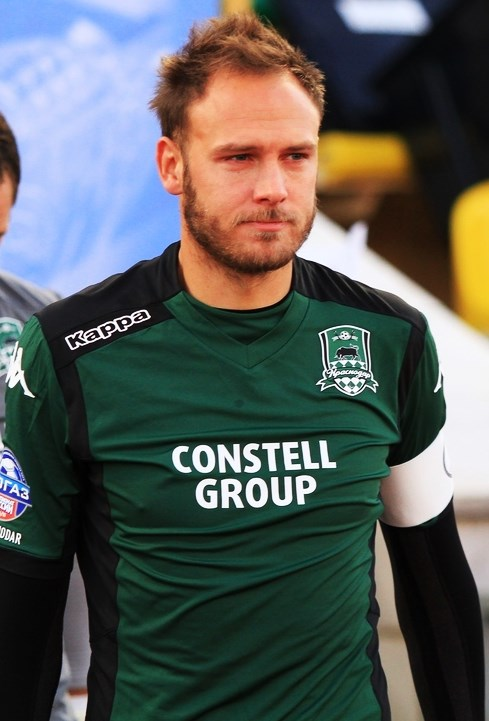
Granqvist lining up for Krasnodar in 2014

On 16 August 2013, Granqvist moved from Genoa to Russian Premier League side Krasnodar.

On 28 January 2018, Helsingborgs IF announced that Granqvist would return following the World Cup. He would join the club on a 3.5-year player contract that would be followed by a three-year term as the director of sports for the club. He played his farewell game for Krasnodar on 13 May 2018.

Granqvist officially retired from professional football on 17 July 2021, having played in 6 leagues in 17 years as a professional footballer; Allsvenskan, Premier League, Eredivisie, Serie A, Russian Premier League and Superettan. He said that he wanted to continue, but his body was not feeling it. He continued at Helsingborg IF as the director of sports.

== International career ==
Granqvist played for the Swedish national team, and, in May 2008, he was included in Sweden's 23-man squad for UEFA Euro 2008. He was an unused substitute in all three of Sweden's games. In 2011, he played in the finals of the Cyprus International Football Tournament, but Sweden lost to Ukraine. On 6 July 2016 Granqvist was appointed captain of Sweden by the new manager Janne Andersson. Granqvist succeeded Zlatan Ibrahimović after the latter's retirement from the national team following UEFA Euro 2016.

In May 2018, he was named in the 23-man Sweden squad for the 2018 FIFA World Cup in Russia. He captained the team for their opening World Cup fixture against South Korea on 18 June 2018. Over the course of the match he provided several long balls over the top which posed a threat to the South Korean defenders. In the 65th minute he scored the only goal of the game, calmly slotting home from the penalty spot. He was given the Player of the Match award. Nine days later, he scored another penalty, the second goal in a 3–0 win over Mexico which meant Sweden qualified for the next round and topped the group. Overall, Granqvist played a full 90 minutes in all games as Sweden were eliminated by England in the quarter final.

In May 2021, Granqvist was somewhat controversially included in Sweden's 26-man squad for the postponed UEFA Euro 2020, since he had not made an appearance for the national team for nearly two years due to ongoing injury problems. He didn't appear in any of their games as Sweden would go on to lose to Ukraine 2-1 in the round of 16, subsequently eliminating them from the tournament.

== Personal life ==
Granqvist goes by the nickname "Granen" (Swedish for 'the spruce'; IPA: [ˈɡrɑ̌ːnɛn]), originating from his last name which means "spruce twig".

Granqvist became a father for a second time after his wife Sofie gave birth in Helsingborg on 6 July 2018, while he was with the Sweden team at the World Cup in Russia.

== Career statistics ==
=== Club ===
Appearances and goals by club, season and competition
Club	Season	League			National cup (Note: Includes Svenska Cupen, FA Cup, KNVB Cup, Coppa Italia, Russian Cup)		League cup (Note: Includes Football League Cup)		Europe		Total	
Club	Season	Division	Apps	Goals	Apps	Goals	Apps	Goals	Apps	Goals	Apps	Goals
Helsingborgs IF	2005	Allsvenskan	26	1	0	0	—		—		26	1
Helsingborgs IF	2006	Allsvenskan	25	0	1	0	—		—		25	0
Helsingborgs IF	Total		51	1	1	0	—		—		52	1
Wigan Athletic (loan)	2006–07	Premier League	0	0	1	0	0	0	—		1	0
Wigan Athletic	2007–08	Premier League	14	0	1	0	1	0	—		16	0
Helsingborgs IF (loan)	2008	Allsvenskan	11	1	0	0	—		—		11	1
Groningen	2008–09	Eredivisie	36	4	3	1	—		—		39	5
Groningen	2009–10	Eredivisie	34	6	3	1	—		—		37	7
Groningen	2010–11	Eredivisie	36	11	4	1	—		—		40	12
Groningen	Total		106	21	10	3	—		—		116	24
Genoa	2011–12	Serie A	28	1	2	0	—		—		30	1
Genoa	2012–13	Serie A	35	1	1	0	—		—		36	1
Genoa	Total		63	2	3	0	—		—		66	2
Krasnodar	2013–14	Russian Premier League	20	1	3	0	—		—		23	1
Krasnodar	2014–15	Russian Premier League	27	0	2	0	—		9 (Note: Appearances in UEFA Europa League)	1	38	1
Krasnodar	2015–16	Russian Premier League	29	1	3	1	—		12	1	44	3
Krasnodar	2016–17	Russian Premier League	29	0	2	2	—		12	0	43	2
Krasnodar	2017–18	Russian Premier League	29	1	0	0	—		4	1	33	2
Krasnodar	Total		134	3	10	3	—		37	3	181	10
Helsingborgs IF	2018	Superettan	15	2	0	0	—		—		15	2
Helsingborgs IF	2019	Allsvenskan	22	0	0	0	—		—		22	0
Helsingborgs IF	2020	Allsvenskan	1	0	0	0	—		—		1	0
Helsingborgs IF	2021	Superettan	5	0	0	0	—		—		5	0
Helsingborgs IF	Total		43	2	0	0	—		—		43	2
Career total			422	30	26	6	1	0	37	3	486	39

=== International ===
Appearances and goals by national team and year
National team	Year	Apps	Goals
Sweden
Sweden	2006	1	0
Sweden	2007	1	0
Sweden	2008	2	0
Sweden	2009	1	0
Sweden	2010	4	2
Sweden	2011	6	0
Sweden	2012	12	0
Sweden	2013	5	0
Sweden	2014	8	0
Sweden	2015	8	0
Sweden	2016	12	1
Sweden	2017	9	3
Sweden	2018	12	3
Sweden	2019	7	0
Total		88	9

Sweden's score is listed first, and the score column indicates the score after each Granqvist goal.

International goals by date, venue, cap, opponent, score, result and competition
No.	Date	Venue	Cap	Opponent	Score	Result	Competition
1	7 September 2010	Swedbank Stadion, Malmö, Sweden	7	San Marino	4–0	6–0	UEFA Euro 2012 qualifying
2	12 October 2010	Amsterdam Arena, Amsterdam, Netherlands	8	Netherlands	1–4	1–4	UEFA Euro 2012 qualifying
3	24 March 2016	Antalya Stadium, Antalya, Turkey	49	Turkey	1–1	1–2	Friendly
4	3 September 2017	Borisov Arena, Barysaw, Belarus	65	Belarus	4–0	4–0	2018 FIFA World Cup qualification
5	7 October 2017	Friends Arena, Solna, Sweden	66	Luxembourg	1–0	8–0	2018 FIFA World Cup qualification
6	7 October 2017	Friends Arena, Solna, Sweden	66	Luxembourg	6–0	8–0	2018 FIFA World Cup qualification
7	18 June 2018	Nizhny Novgorod Stadium, Nizhny Novgorod, Russia	73	South Korea	1–0	1–0	2018 FIFA World Cup
8	27 June 2018	Central Stadium, Yekaterinburg, Russia	75	Mexico	2–0	3–0	2018 FIFA World Cup
9	17 November 2018	Konya Büyükşehir Stadium, Konya, Turkey	80	Turkey	1–0	1–0	2018–19 UEFA Nations League B

== Honours ==
Helsingborgs IF

- Superettan: 2018
- Svenska Cupen: 2006

Individual

- Guldbollen: 2017
- Swedish Defender of the Year: 2014, 2015, 2017, 2018
- FIFA World Cup Fantasy Team: 2018
- Stor Grabb: 2014
