= Kloka Anna i Vallåkra =

Swedish cunning woman and natural healer (1820–1896)

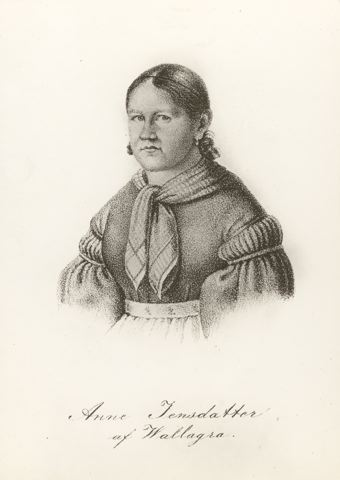
- Lithograph of Anna Jönsdotter, called "Wise Anna of Vallåkra", made by an unknown Danish priest in 1836.
- Born: Anna Jönsdotter c. 1820; Vallåkra, Skåne, Sweden
- Died: 1896; Sweden
- Other names: Vallåkraflickan
- Occupations: Cunning woman, natural healer
- Known for: Alleged divine visions and faith healing

Anna Jönsdotter (c. 1820–1896), known as Kloka Anna i Vallåkra (Wise Anna of Vallåkra) or Vallåkraflickan (The Vallåkra Girl), was a Swedish cunning woman and natural healer. She was widely known and gained considerable attention from her contemporaries through her alleged divine visions and her ability to heal the sick.

== Biography ==
In 1837, Jönsdotter lost consciousness on the field during the harvest work. Awakening, she claimed to have had divine visions and to have been granted the ability to heal the sick by God. After this day, she was active as a healer and drew a lot of attention. She was at one point accused of quackery. In 1837–1838, she made a tour in Denmark, where she appeared before the monarch at the royal court to demonstrate her ability.

She retired from healing after her marriage, with the claim that she lost her ability after her sexual debut.
