= Tånga och Rögle =

- Location within Skåne Location within Sweden
- Coordinates: 56°12′N 12°42′E
- Country: Sweden
- Province: Skåne
- County: Skåne County
- Municipality: Helsingborg Municipality

Area
  - Total: 0.43 km^{2} (0.17 sq mi)

Population (31 December 2010)
  - Total: 223
  - Density: 524/km^{2} (1,360/sq mi)
- Time zone: UTC+1 (CET)
  - Summer (DST): UTC+2 (CEST)

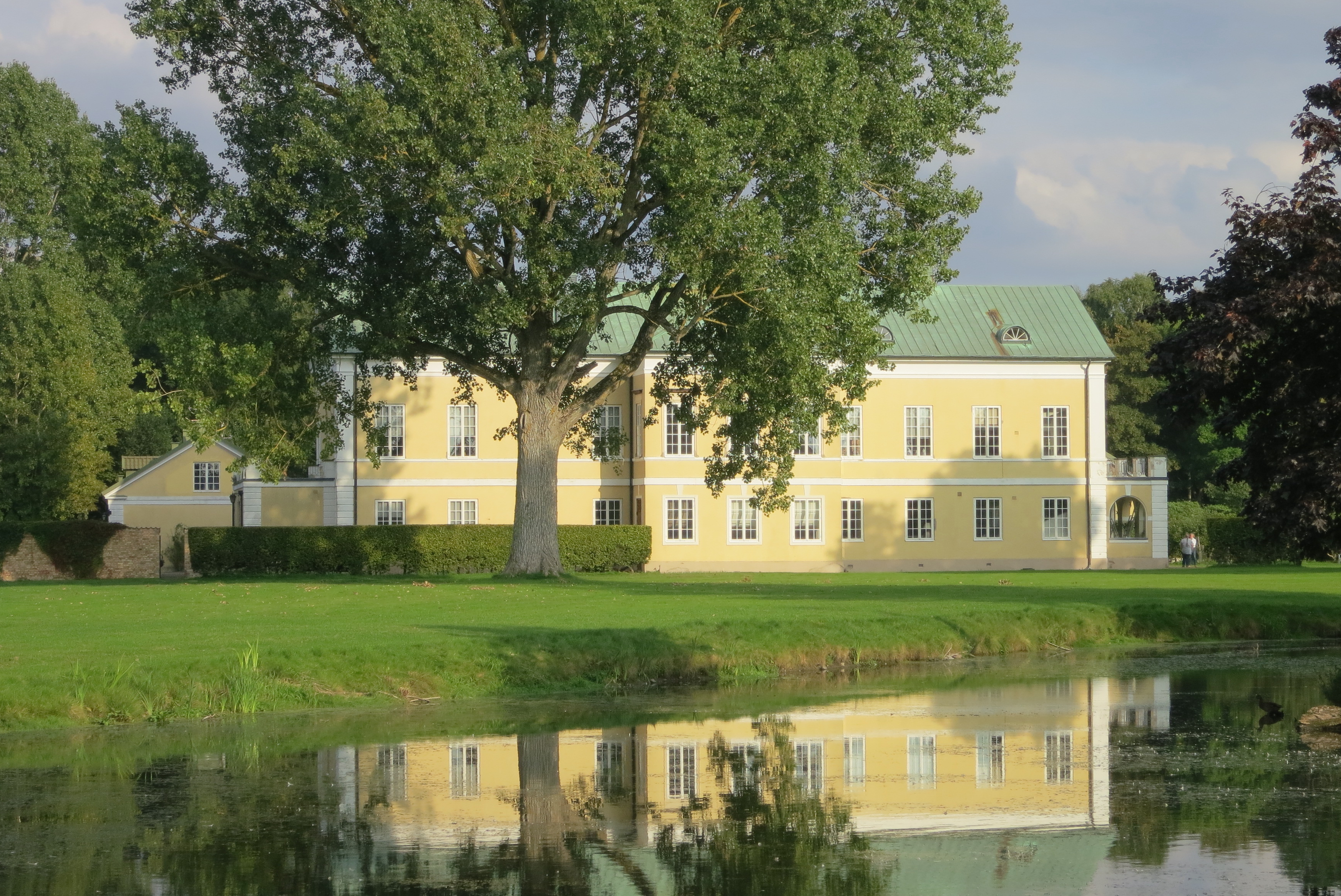

Tånga och Rögle is a locality situated in Helsingborg Municipality, Skåne County, Sweden with 223 inhabitants in 2010.
