= Hunseby Church =

Coordinates: 54°47′54″N 11°30′53″E

- Hunseby Kirke
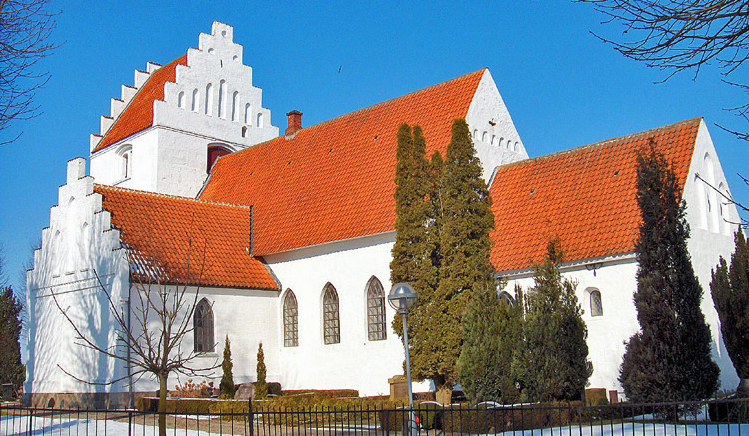
- Hunseby Church
- Location: Hunseby, Lolland
- Denomination: Church of Denmark

History
- Earlier dedication: Saint Andrew

Architecture
- Architectural type: Romanesque architecture, Gothic Architecture
- Completed: ca. 1150

Administration
- Diocese: Diocese of Lolland–Falster
- Deanery: Maribo Domprovsti
- Parish: Hunseby Sogn

Hunseby Church is located in the village of Hunseby some 3 km north of Maribo on the Danish island of Lolland. Built in the middle of the 12th century, the church has a Romanesque chancel and nave and a Gothic tower.

== History ==
The church was originally dedicated to St Andrew as can be seen from the inscription on the oldest bell from 1465. From Romanesque inscriptions in the stonework supporting an old portal, it appears the church must have existed in the middle of the 12th century. Little is known of its early ownership apart from the fact that the Crown had appointment rights shortly before the Reformation. It remained the property of the Crown until 1565 when it was transferred to Axel Urne til Aarsmarke. One of the later owners was Eggert Christopher Knuth who was married to Sister Lerche. It came under the authority of Knuthenborg when the county was established by Sister Lerche in 1714. In April 1964, it gained its independence.

== Architecture ==
Built of fine granite stonework, the Romanesque church is unusually large. The outer walls are plastered and whitewashed while the roof is of red tile. The chancel has retained its Romanesque windows. Compared to the chancel, the nave is higher and wider. A sculpted head on the south wall is said to be King Huns's head, in line with the legend behind the name of the village. The Gothic tower is in red brick with some granite stonework and stepped gables. The Knuthenborg burial chapel was added on the south side of the church in 1851 and completely rebuilt in 1880.

== Interior ==
The round chancel arch has rope-shaped corbels while the chancel ceiling was vaulted in the Gothic period. The Auricular Baroque altarpiece is from c. 1700 with a painting of the Last Supper and the arms of Eggert Christopher Knuth and Sister Lerche. The pulpit, in the High Renaissance style, is from 1617 and bears the arms of Knud Urne and Merete Grubbe. In the burial chapel, there is an epitaph for Eggert Christopher Knuth (died 1697) and Sister Lerche (died 1723).

== Churchyard ==
Notable burials at the churchyard include Adam Wilhelm Knuth and Helle Stangerup.

== See also ==
- List of churches on Lolland
