= Jonas Dahlgren =

Swedish association football player

Personal information
- Full name: Lars-Ingvar Jonas Dahlgren
- Date of birth: 17 February 1966 (age 60)
- Place of birth: Helsingborg, Sweden
- Positions: Midfielder; forward

Youth career
- Påarps GIF

Senior career*
Years	Team	Apps	(Gls)
–1987	Påarps GIF		
1988–1989	Halmstads BK	40	(14)
1990–1995	Helsingborgs IF		
1996	Trelleborgs FF	15	(2)
- * Club domestic league appearances and goals

Lars-Ingvar Jonas Dahlgren (born 17 February 1966) is a Swedish former footballer who played as a midfielder or forward. He played in Allsvenskan for Halmstads BK, Helsingborgs IF, and Trelleborgs FF.

== Playing career ==
=== Early career ===
Starting off his career with Påarps GIF, Dahlgren signed with Halmstads BK in 1988 and helped the team win the 1988 Division 1 Södra title and win promotion to Allsvenskan by scoring eight goals in 22 games and forming a prolific forward duo together with Stefan Lindqvist. In 1989, he scored six goals in 18 appearances in his first Allsvenskan season.

=== Helsingborgs IF ===
After the 1989 Allsvenskan season, Dahlgren left Halmstad for his hometown club Helsingborgs IF. During the 1992 Division 1 Södra season, he helped Helsingborg win promotion to Allsvenskan together with the prolific forward duo Mats Magnusson and Henrik Larsson. During Helsingborg's first Allsvenskan season in 25 years, Dahlgren played in 24 games and scored four goals. In 1994, he was part of the Helsingborg team that reached the final of the 1993–94 Svenska Cupen, losing to IFK Norrköping in overtime. He left Helsingborgs IF after the 1995 Allsvenskan season, citing family reasons and a wish to be able to spend more time together with his wife and two children.

Dahlgren made a total of 281 appearances for Helsingborgs IF between 1990 and 1995, of which 71 were in Allsvenskan.

=== Trelleborgs FF ===
In May 1996, Trelleborgs FF announced that they had signed Dahlgren for the remainder of the 1996 Allsvenskan season. Dahlgren represented Trelleborg for one season, scoring 2 goals in 15 games.

== Honours ==
Halmstads BK

- Division 1 Södra: 1988

Helsingborgs IF

- Division 1 Södra: 1992

Individual

- Årets HIF:are (Helsingborgs IF player of the year): 1991
