= Hasslarp =

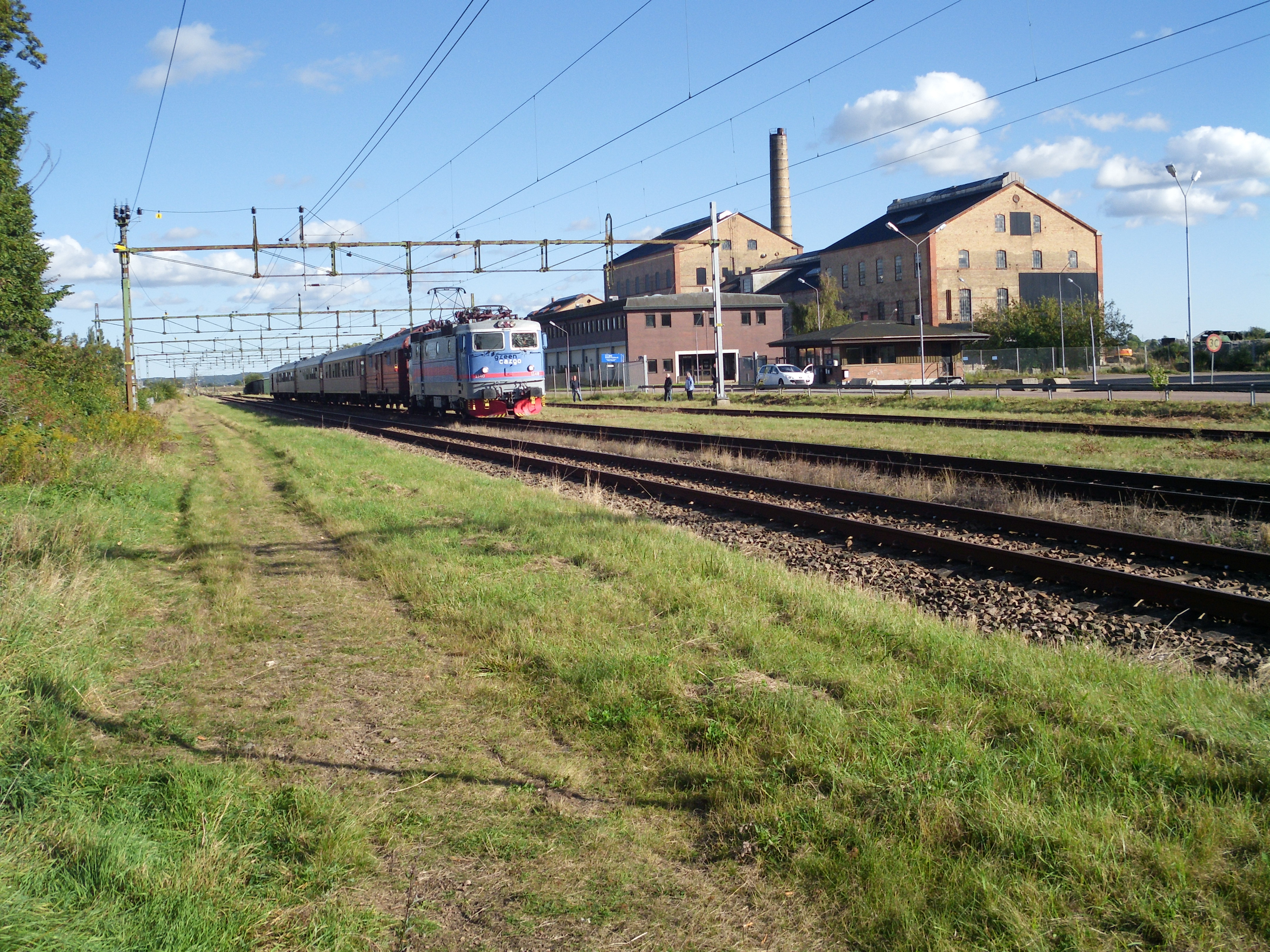
- Freight train station and a former sugar factory in Hasslarp

- Location within Skåne Location within Sweden
- Coordinates: 56°08′N 12°49′E
- Country: Sweden
- Province: Skåne
- County: Skåne County
- Municipality: Helsingborg Municipality

Area
  - Total: 0.51 km^{2} (0.20 sq mi)

Population (31 December 2010)
  - Total: 474
  - Density: 928/km^{2} (2,400/sq mi)
- Time zone: UTC+1 (CET)
  - Summer (DST): UTC+2 (CEST)

Hasslarp is a locality situated in Helsingborg Municipality, Skåne County, Sweden with 474 inhabitants in 2010.
