= Bårslöv =

Swedish locality

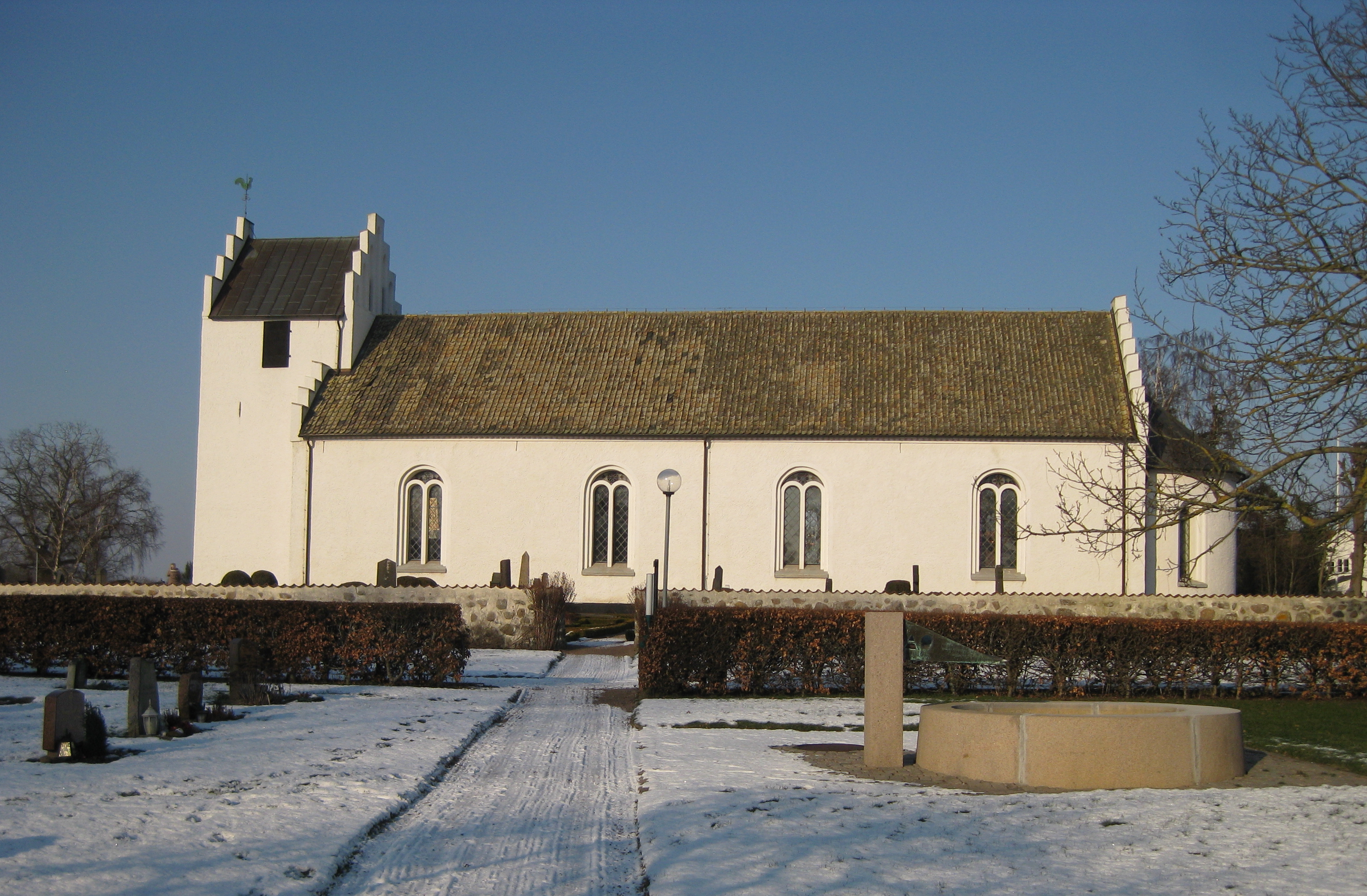
- Bårslöv Church

- Location within Skåne Location within Sweden
- Coordinates: 56°00′N 12°49′E
- Country: Sweden
- Province: Skåne
- County: Skåne County
- Municipality: Helsingborg Municipality

Area
  - Total: 1.20 km^{2} (0.46 sq mi)

Population (31 December 2010)
  - Total: 2,682
  - Density: 2,233/km^{2} (5,780/sq mi)
- Time zone: UTC+1 (CET)
  - Summer (DST): UTC+2 (CEST)

Bårslöv is a locality situated in Helsingborg Municipality, Skåne County, Sweden with 2,682 inhabitants in 2010.
