= Vallåkra =

- Location within Skåne Location within Sweden
- Coordinates: 55°58′N 12°52′E
- Country: Sweden
- Province: Skåne
- County: Skåne County
- Municipality: Helsingborg Municipality

Area
  - Total: 0.59 km^{2} (0.23 sq mi)

Population (31 December 2010)
  - Total: 642
  - Density: 1,089/km^{2} (2,820/sq mi)
- Time zone: UTC+1 (CET)
  - Summer (DST): UTC+2 (CEST)

Vallåkra is a locality situated in Helsingborg Municipality, Skåne County, Sweden with 642 inhabitants in 2010.
