= Domsten =

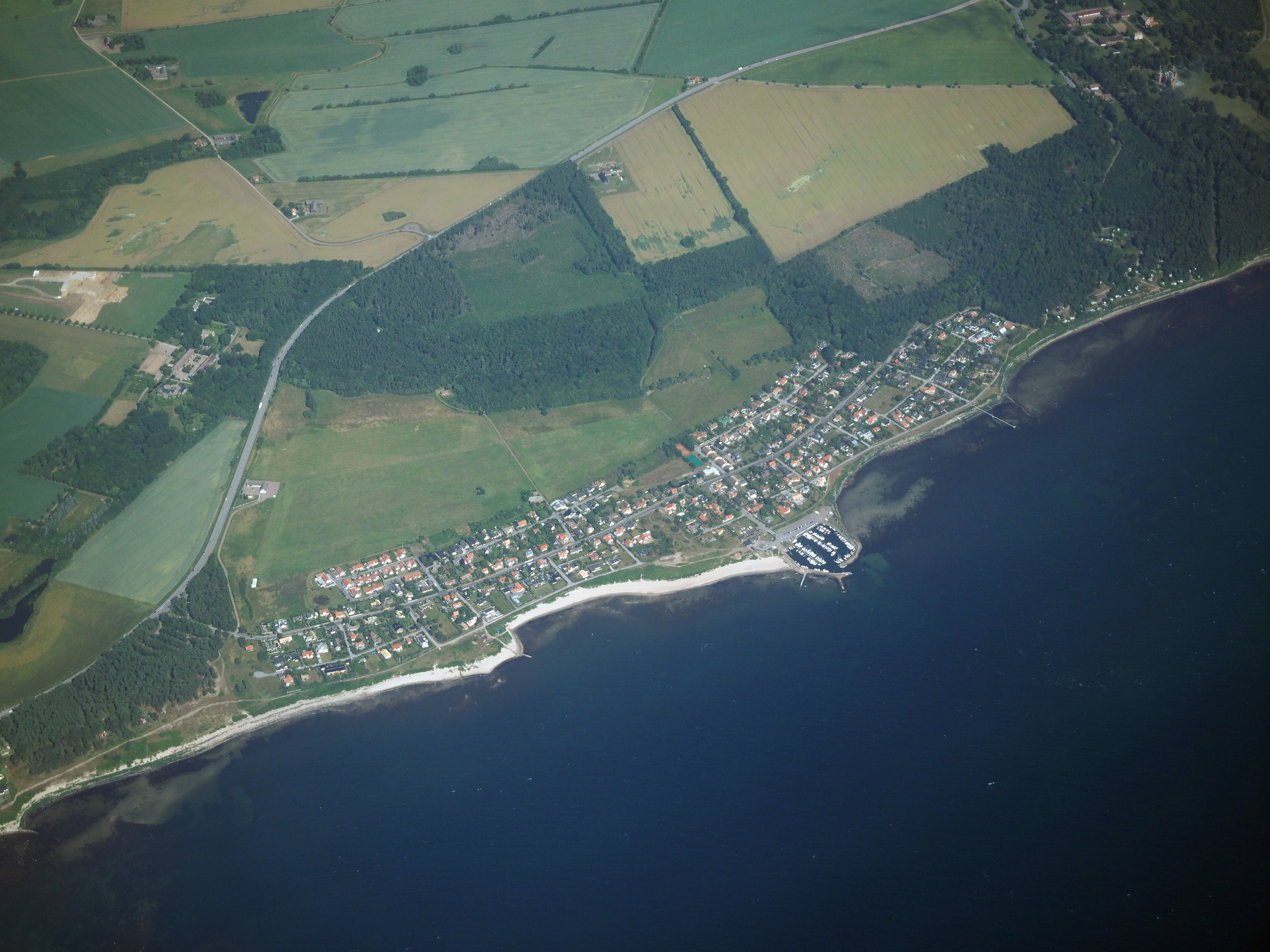
- Aerial view of Domsten

- Location within Skåne Location within Sweden
- Coordinates: 56°07′N 12°36′E
- Country: Sweden
- Province: Skåne
- County: Skåne County
- Municipality: Helsingborg Municipality

Area
  - Total: 0.42 km^{2} (0.16 sq mi)

Population (31 December 2010)
  - Total: 617
  - Density: 1,472/km^{2} (3,810/sq mi)
- Time zone: UTC+1 (CET)
  - Summer (DST): UTC+2 (CEST)

Domsten is a locality situated in Helsingborg Municipality, Skåne County, Sweden with 617 inhabitants in 2010.

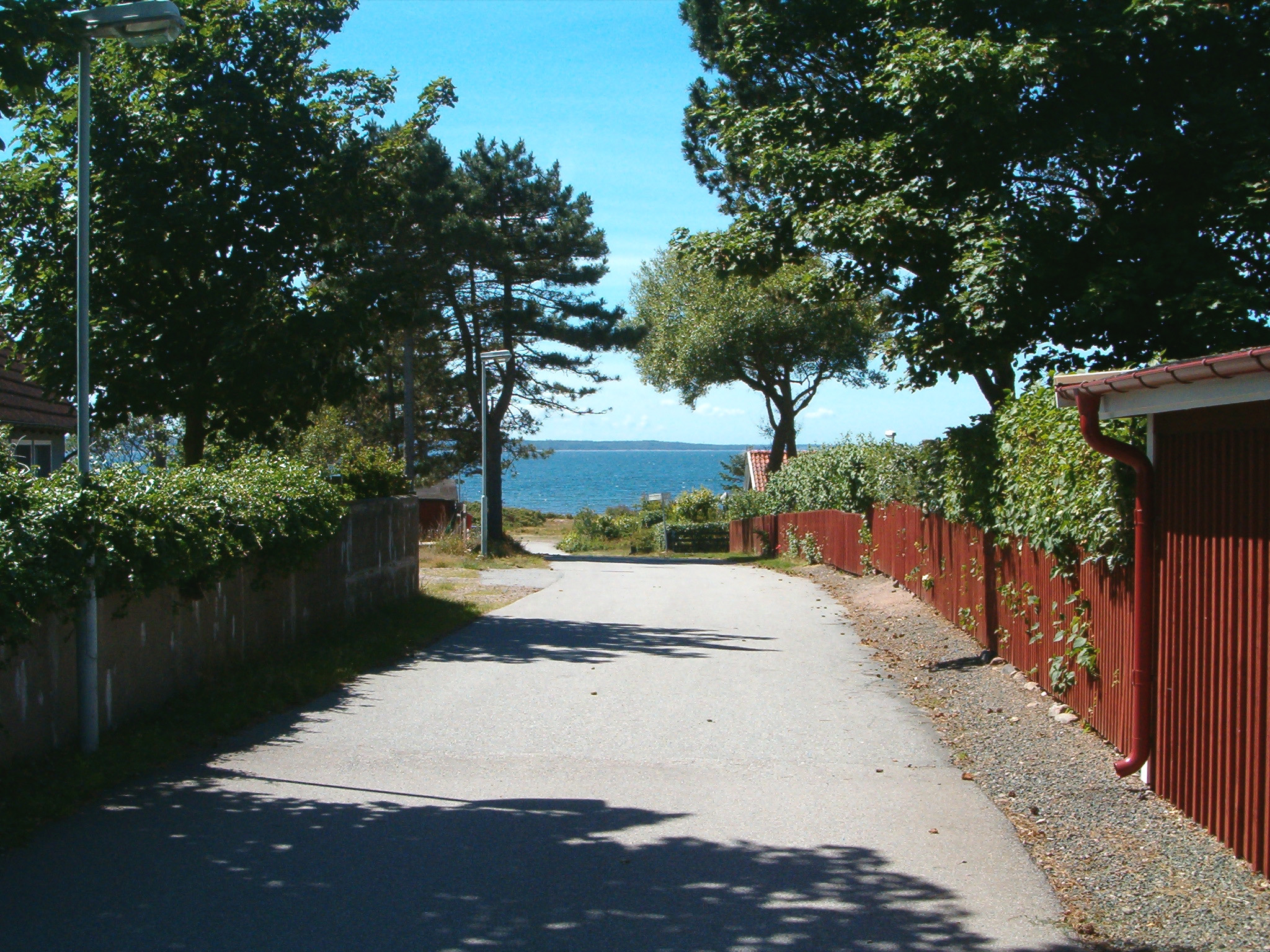
Street in Domsten
