= Helsingborg Municipality =

Helsingborg
- Municipality
- Helsingborgs kommun
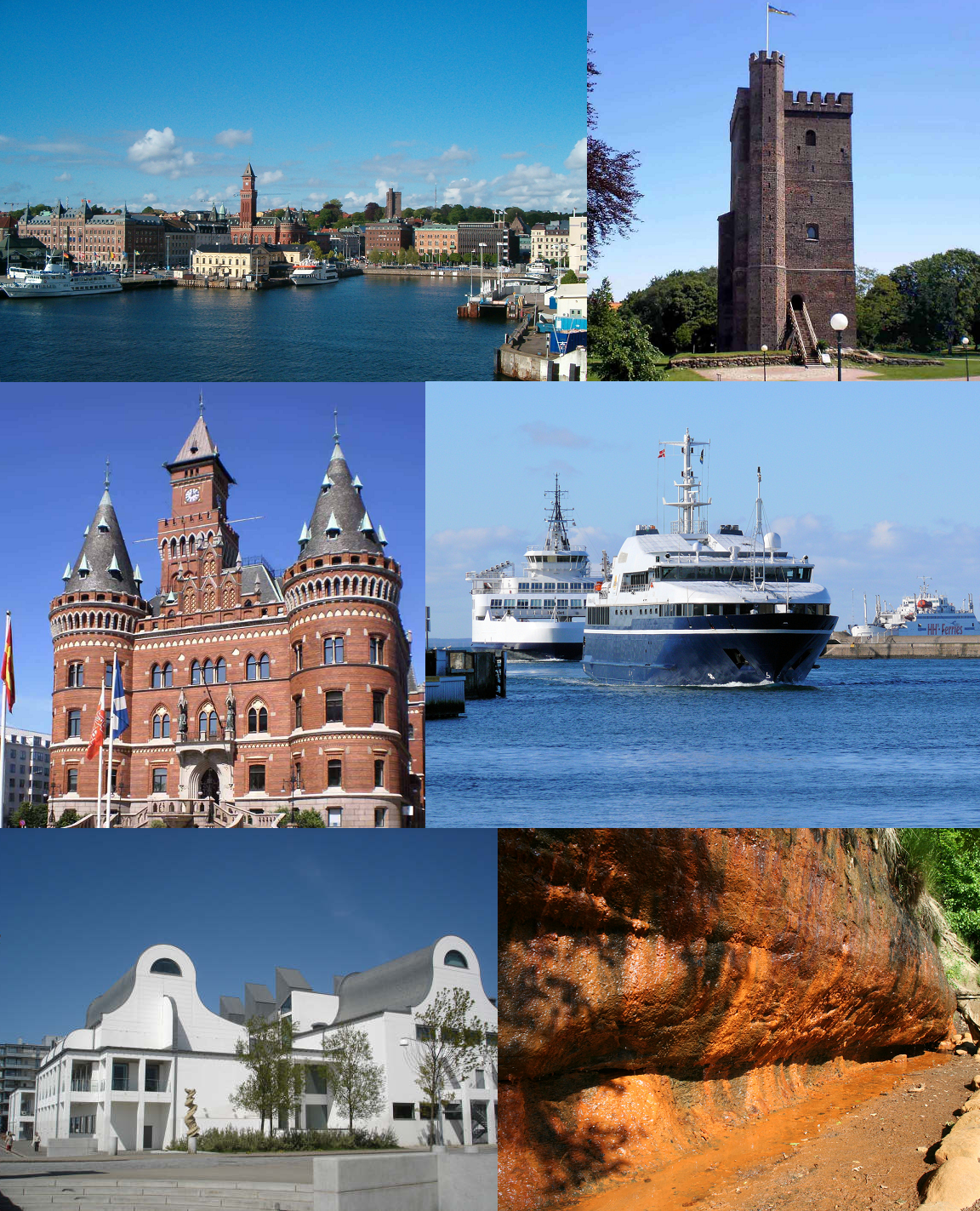

- Coat of arms

- Coordinates: 56°03′N 12°43′E
- Country: Sweden
- County: Scania County
- Seat: Helsingborg

Government
  - Mayor: Christian Orsing (M)

Area
  - Total: 423.97 km^{2} (163.70 sq mi)
  - Land: 344.01 km^{2} (132.82 sq mi)
  - Water: 79.96 km^{2} (30.87 sq mi)
- Area as of 1 January 2014.

Population (30 June 2025)
  - Total: 152,644
  - Density: 443.72/km^{2} (1,149.2/sq mi)
- Time zone: UTC+1 (CET)
  - Summer (DST): UTC+2 (CEST)
- ISO 3166 code: SE
- Province: Scania
- Municipal code: 1283
- Website: www.helsingborg.se
- Density is calculated using land area only.

Helsingborg Municipality (Swedish: Helsingborgs kommun) is a municipality in Scania County in Sweden. Its seat is located in the city of Helsingborg, which is Sweden's eighth-largest city. The municipality had a population of 152,644 on 30 June 2025 and the metropolitan area has about 320,000 inhabitants.

Between 1912 and 1971 the name of the town was officially spelled Hälsingborg (rather like the region of Hälsingland but unlike neighbouring Danish Helsingør and the Finnish capital Helsingfors (Helsinki)). The spelling was changed back to the older version when the present municipality was created in 1971 through the amalgamation of the Town of Hälsingborg with four surrounding rural municipalities. Since the 1990s the municipality again styles itself Helsingborgs stad (Town of Helsingborg). This usage is only nominal and has no effect on the status of the municipality.

== Localities ==
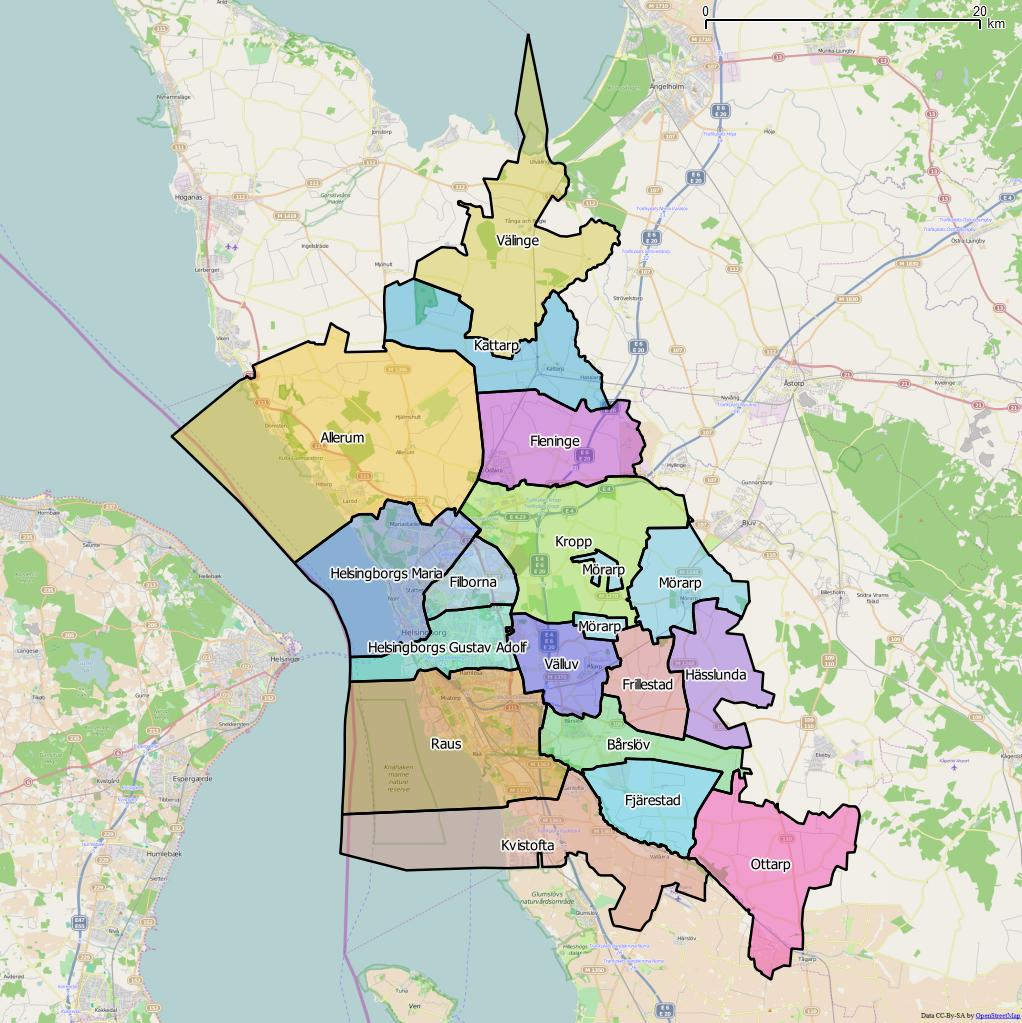
Helsingborg Municipality districts

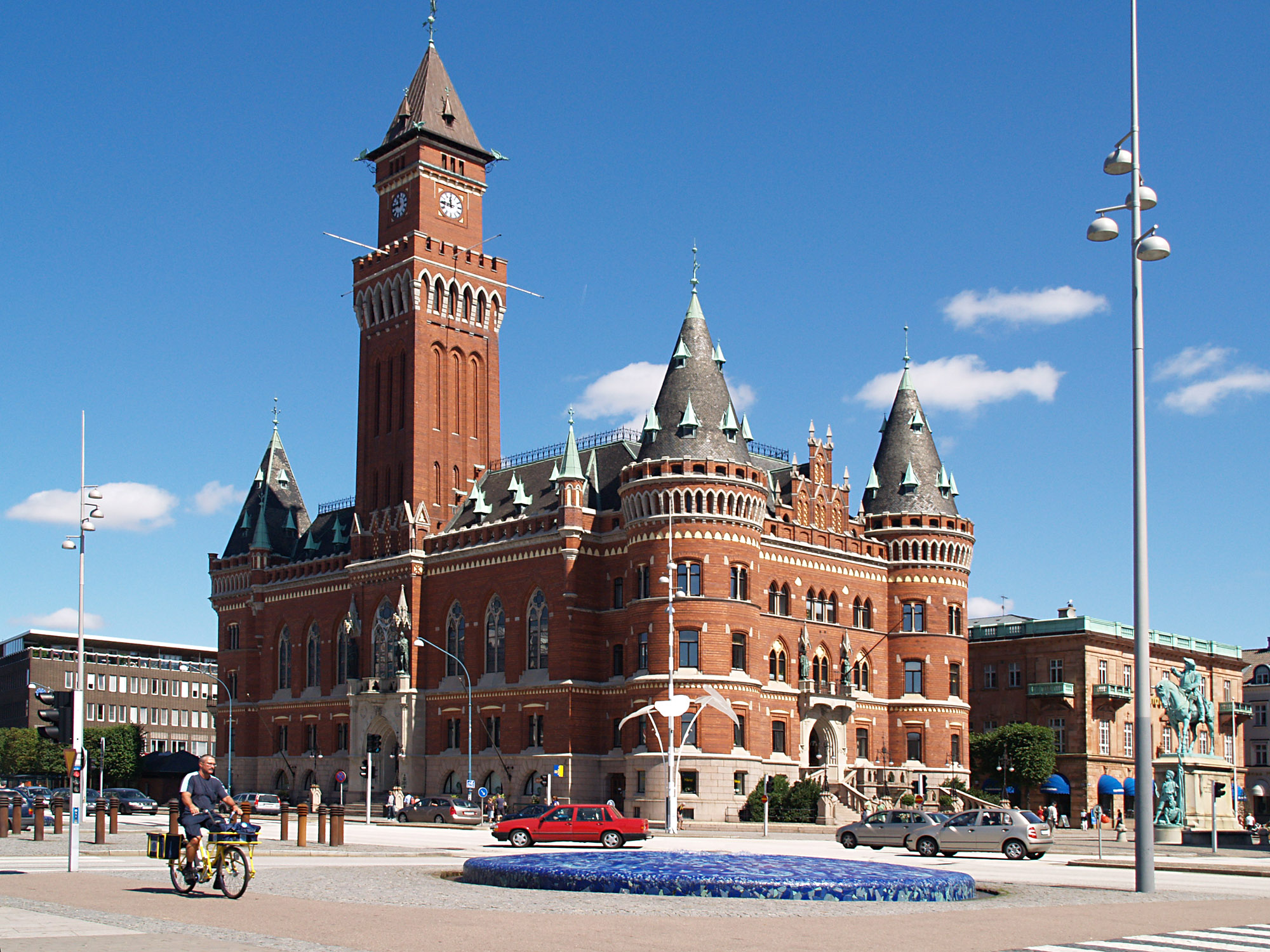
Helsingborg City Hall

As of 2018, there were 16 urban areas the municipality.

#	Locality	Population
1	Helsingborg	109,869
2	Rydebäck (part of)	6,429
3	Ödåkra	5,413
4	Hittarp	4,670
5	Påarp	2,959
6	Bårslöv	2,774
7	Mörarp	1,889
8	Gantofta	1,356
9	Vallåkra	828
10	Kattarp	732
11	Allerum	725
12	Domsten	602
13	Hasslarp	600
14	Tånga och Rögle	230
15	Utvälinge	230
16	Fleninge	208

=== Districts ===
The administrative division of Helsingborg is divided into 17 districts. They are Allerum, Bårslöv, Filborna, Fjärestad, Fleninge, Frillestad, Helsingborgs Gustav Adolf, Helsingborgs Maria, Hässlunda, Kattarp, Kropp, Kvistofta, Mörarp, Ottarp, Raus, Välinge and Välluv.

== Demographics ==
This is a demographic table based on Helsingborg Municipality's electoral districts in the 2022 Swedish general election sourced from SVT's election platform, in turn taken from SCB official statistics.

In total there were 149,791 residents, including 110,550 Swedish citizens of voting age. 41.5% voted for the left coalition and 56.8% for the right coalition. This made Helsingborg the strongest among large municipalities for the right coalition. Indicators are in percentage points except population totals and income.

Location	Residents	Citizen adults	Left vote	Right vote	Employed	Swedish parents	Foreign heritage	Income SEK	Degree
Location			%	%					
Adolfsberg	1,532	1,094	51.2	47.4	73	46	54	23,036	34
Allerum	1,442	1,052	24.3	74.8	87	90	10	30,024	43
Berga	1,816	1,403	44.8	53.8	78	54	46	25,788	39
Björka-Väla	1,712	1,157	45.7	50.6	71	39	61	24,031	35
Brohult	1,491	1,150	48.1	49.8	69	40	60	20,461	26
Bårslöv V	1,489	1,081	40.0	58.3	77	62	38	26,204	34
Bårslöv Ö	1,260	912	38.2	58.6	77	65	35	24,614	29
Centrum S	1,592	1,307	41.8	56.5	74	69	31	28,551	51
Centrum V	1,471	1,357	31.6	67.9	82	81	19	29,206	52
Centrum Ö	1,615	1,508	33.6	65.2	79	81	19	29,723	52
Dalhem S	1,811	1,220	52.1	45.0	63	40	60	18,604	22
Dalhem-Källstorp	1,695	1,224	49.6	48.2	60	43	57	19,544	25
Drottninghög V	1,195	895	57.7	37.9	58	28	72	14,926	27
Drottninghög Ö	1,829	1,194	64.6	30.0	54	21	79	15,125	23
Elineberg	1,871	1,352	53.1	43.9	63	47	53	18,344	33
Eneborg M	1,324	970	53.1	43.4	64	39	61	18,343	40
Eneborg V	1,583	973	62.3	33.5	59	30	70	16,612	35
Eneborg Ö	1,412	1,216	46.1	52.0	75	60	40	23,638	49
Eskilsminne	1,782	1,237	42.4	57.1	76	66	34	26,268	49
Fredriksdal M	1,821	1,057	53.5	43.4	60	30	70	17,845	35
Fredriksdal V	1,646	1,177	60.0	36.2	61	37	63	18,372	31
Fredriksdal Ö	1,508	907	66.6	27.1	49	19	81	14,145	31
Furutorp	1,641	743	56.7	39.0	47	23	77	11,744	43
Gantofta	1,834	1,299	34.0	64.9	87	87	13	29,238	45
Gustav Adolf	1,432	996	59.4	37.0	52	33	67	15,748	36
Gustavslund V	1,520	1,129	35.6	63.2	86	78	22	31,491	54
Gustavslund Ö	1,932	1,169	34.4	64.8	88	65	35	33,707	55
Hittarp-Domsten	1,500	1,272	28.1	71.1	77	89	11	38,530	68
Humlegården	1,575	1,155	37.8	61.5	84	80	20	32,279	54
Husensjö	1,905	1,393	41.4	57.5	86	79	21	32,973	59
Högaborg V	1,432	935	54.5	42.7	53	36	64	14,065	39
Högaborg Ö	1,808	1,192	61.4	34.7	57	27	73	15,413	26
Högasten	1,597	1,327	43.7	54.2	69	62	38	21,327	33
Kattarp	1,658	1,130	34.2	64.1	71	68	32	22,308	30
Laröd V	1,853	1,378	29.8	69.2	81	87	13	36,921	65
Laröd Ö	1,901	1,406	32.6	66.2	85	83	17	30,968	50
Lundsbäck	1,619	1,051	41.6	56.3	72	47	53	26,984	46
Lussebäcken	1,535	1,207	47.4	50.7	66	62	38	20,267	31
Margaretaplatsen	1,249	1,132	34.4	64.0	81	83	17	29,343	55
Mariastaden N	2,101	1,384	32.0	67.4	86	78	22	37,623	64
Mariastaden S	1,764	1,170	35.1	63.8	81	74	26	31,726	52
Mariastaden V	1,692	1,192	41.5	56.8	82	80	20	31,297	58
Mariastaden Ö	1,936	1,139	39.1	58.4	70	44	56	23,166	42
Mörarp V	1,346	967	29.6	68.1	84	81	19	27,242	35
Mörarp Ö	1,490	1,044	32.7	66.7	83	80	20	27,401	35
Närlunda	1,807	1,215	63.6	33.0	60	35	65	17,487	33
Oceanhamnen	1,039	869	39.8	59.3	64	57	43	23,536	51
Olympia	1,628	1,395	39.5	59.5	70	71	29	24,627	51
Planteringen N	2,039	1,236	59.2	32.5	51	25	75	13,976	25
Planteringen S	2,086	1,466	49.8	46.1	58	42	58	17,335	30
Påarp V	1,878	1,313	31.7	66.7	81	70	30	27,020	34
Påarp Ö	1,863	1,362	32.9	66.6	84	85	15	26,494	32
Pålsjöbaden	1,054	985	23.5	75.8	74	88	12	31,233	61
Pålsjö Ö	1,391	1,067	44.2	54.8	79	77	23	26,009	50
Ragnvalla	1,921	1,173	48.7	46.2	65	34	66	19,569	29
Ramlösa N	1,556	1,196	41.0	58.7	86	83	17	32,633	55
Ramlösa Ö	1,631	1,212	35.5	63.3	88	84	16	35,189	59
Ramlösabrunn	1,795	1,305	42.8	56.2	85	79	21	30,588	55
Raus S	1,413	1,026	37.0	61.9	86	77	23	29,707	48
Ringstorp C	1,581	1,374	41.3	57.3	81	75	25	23,965	41
Ringstorp N	1,715	1,343	37.5	61.4	80	75	25	27,658	52
Ringstorp Ö	1,718	1,173	40.9	56.5	72	60	40	23,382	42
Rosengården C	1,728	1,165	54.3	43.4	70	46	54	22,829	39
Rosengården V	1,558	1,245	47.3	50.3	72	65	35	23,597	35
Rosengården Ö	1,482	1,139	54.2	44.2	71	40	60	20,575	36
Rydebäck M	1,721	1,310	37.4	61.8	89	91	9	30,601	60
Rydebäck N	1,701	1,206	33.2	65.9	87	88	12	32,942	60
Rydebäck S	1,541	1,134	34.3	65.1	88	94	6	35,159	63
Rydebäck Ö	1,568	1,121	36.4	62.8	88	86	14	30,019	57
Råå N	1,602	1,343	42.8	56.6	82	89	11	27,389	61
Råå S	1,770	1,412	37.2	62.1	84	91	9	32,173	57
Slottshöjden N	1,616	1,286	43.6	54.2	72	61	39	23,376	51
Slottshöjden S	1,528	1,386	39.9	59.1	79	81	19	25,921	50
Sofieberg	1,527	1,149	45.5	53.7	83	73	27	30,015	54
St Jörgens plats	1,436	1,334	32.9	66.9	82	84	16	31,123	52
Stadsparken	1,489	976	57.8	38.6	61	35	65	17,706	33
Stattena	1,597	1,343	43.6	54.5	77	69	31	23,524	44
Söder	1,728	1,063	60.6	37.3	58	24	76	15,812	41
Tågaborg C	1,598	1,313	41.4	57.1	80	78	22	29,211	52
Tågaborg M	1,484	1,327	38.2	60.7	82	80	20	28,998	51
Tågaborg N	1,627	1,357	29.4	69.7	80	84	16	33,732	65
Tågaborg S	1,676	1,385	39.7	59.4	79	79	21	27,704	55
Tågaborg Ö	1,607	1,419	41.7	57.0	79	70	30	27,025	47
Vallåkra-Ottarp	1,784	1,307	31.4	67.6	82	84	16	27,785	39
Viskängen	1,654	1,332	44.6	53.3	75	63	37	24,801	45
Välinge	756	560	34.9	64.2	82	86	14	26,916	35
Västergård N	1,389	1,009	51.6	46.6	68	42	58	21,564	35
Wilson park	1,768	1,373	47.3	51.5	75	67	33	26,822	53
Ättekulla N	1,305	1,067	48.2	50.3	77	60	40	21,959	33
Ättekulla Ö	1,256	983	43.5	55.2	75	65	35	22,278	31
Ödåkra N	1,642	1,194	32.3	66.9	80	75	25	25,268	35
Ödåkra V	1,627	1,114	40.8	57.8	78	59	41	26,991	41
Ödåkra Ö	1,694	1,235	40.0	59.1	82	65	35	27,508	46
Source: SVT

== Twin towns – sister cities ==
Helsingborg is twinned with:

- Alexandria, United States
- Dubrovnik, Croatia
- Pärnu, Estonia

== See also ==
- Municipalities of Sweden
- European route E4
