= Hunseby =

- Town
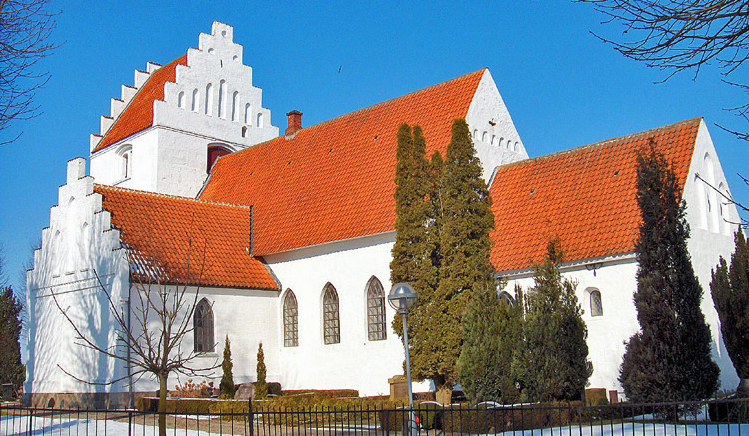
- Hunseby Church

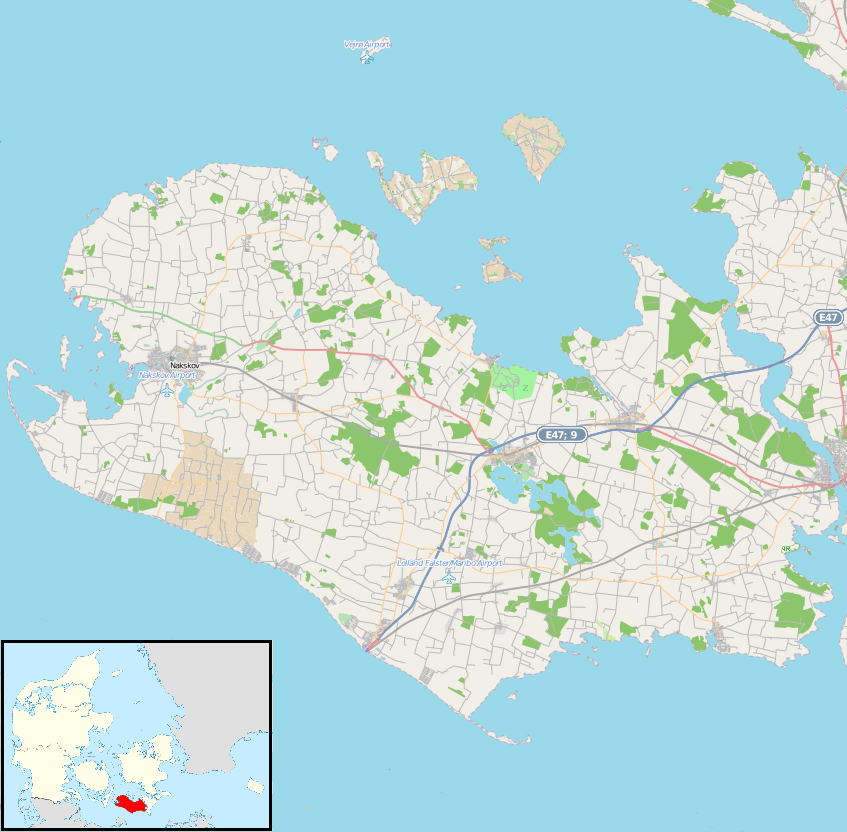
- Location on Lolland
- Coordinates: 54°47′52″N 11°31′19″E
- Country: Denmark
- Region: Zealand (Sjælland)
- Municipality: Lolland Municipality

Population (2026)
  - Total: 385
- Time zone: UTC+1 (CET)
  - Summer (DST): UTC+2 (CEST)

Hunseby is a village located around 3 km (1.9 mi) north of Maribo on the Danish island of Lolland. It belongs to Lolland Municipality in Region Sjælland. As of 2026, it has a population of 385.

== Etymology ==
According to legend, Hunsby is the village of King Huns, a giant whose head can be seen high on the south wall of Hunsby Church. The legend tells how Huns drowned as he attempted to take the island of Askø which lies off Bandholm. He was buried in Kong Huns Høj near Knuthenborg Manor.

== History ==
From Romanesque inscriptions in the stonework supporting an old portal, it appears the church must have existed in the middle of the 12th century. In 1714, the parish came under the authority of Sister Lerche when she established the county of Knuthenborg. She had already opened Hunseby School in 1698 and in 1715 she established a hospital accommodating up to eight patients from the county. In 1879, Karen Knuth built a number of so-called free houses to accommodate servants and members of staff who had worked at Knuthenborg. An example can be seen at No. 30 Kirkevej.

== Notable people ==
- Adam Christopher von Knuth (1687-1736) the first Count of Knuthenborg, buried in Hunseby Church

== Landmarks ==
Dating at least from the middle of the 12th century, Hunseby Church has a Romanesque chancel and nave and a Gothic tower. Recent research has indicated that the building may have been built as early as 1060, making it one of the oldest churches in Denmark.

== Hunseby today ==
Hunseby and Maglemer now form one community, sharing a sports ground, church, institutions and a nursery. Over the years, Knuthenborg has exerted considerable influence on the two villages, especially in regard to architecture. Many of the 300,000 visitors to Knuthenborg Safari Park travel through the community, sometimes admiring the small English-looking houses built by the estate in former times.
