= Påarp =

- Location within Skåne Location within Sweden
- Coordinates: 56°02′N 12°49′E
- Country: Sweden
- Province: Skåne
- County: Skåne County
- Municipality: Helsingborg Municipality

Area
  - Total: 1.60 km^{2} (0.62 sq mi)

Population (31 December 2010)
  - Total: 2,789
  - Density: 1,746/km^{2} (4,520/sq mi)
- Time zone: UTC+1 (CET)
  - Summer (DST): UTC+2 (CEST)

Påarp is a locality situated in Helsingborg Municipality, Skåne County, Sweden with 2,789 inhabitants in 2010.
