= 2016–17 FC Krasnodar season =

FC Krasnodar
2016–17 season
- Chairman: Sergey Galitsky
- Manager: Oleg Kononov until 13 September; Igor Shalimov (caretaker); 13 September-6 October; Igor Shalimov until 6 October
- Stadium: Kuban Stadium (until 9 October); Krasnodar Stadium (from 9 October)
- Russian Premier League: 4th
- Russian Cup: Quarter-final (vs. Ural Yekaterinburg)
- Europa League: Round of 16 (vs. Celta Vigo)
- Top goalscorer: League: Fyodor Smolov (18); All: Fyodor Smolov 25
- Highest home attendance: 33,550 vs Schalke 04; 20 October 2016
- Lowest home attendance: 5,200 vs Rubin Kazan; 2 October 2016
Home colours	Away colours

The 2016–17 FC Krasnodar season was the 6th successive season that the club played in the Russian Premier League, the highest tier of association football in Russia. They finished the season in 4th place, reaching the quarterfinals of the Russian Cup and the Round of 16 of the Europa League.

== Season events ==
On 13 September 2016, Oleg Kononov resigned as manager, with Igor Shalimov taking over as caretaker manager before being appointed the team's permanent manager on 6 October.

== Squad ==
As of 15 March 2017

Note: Flags indicate national team as defined under FIFA eligibility rules; some limited exceptions apply. Players may hold more than one non-FIFA nationality.

No.	Pos.	Nation	Player
1	GK	RUS	Stanislav Kritsyuk
3	DF	BRA	Naldo
4	DF	BLR	Alyaksandr Martynovich (Vice-captain)
5	MF	RUS	Dmitri Torbinski
6	DF	SWE	Andreas Granqvist (Captain)
7	MF	RUS	Pavel Mamayev
8	MF	RUS	Yury Gazinsky
10	MF	GEO	Tornike Okriashvili
11	MF	RUS	Vyacheslav Podberyozkin
12	DF	ECU	Cristian Ramírez
14	FW	BRA	Wánderson
15	MF	RUS	Ilya Zhigulyov
16	MF	SWE	Viktor Claesson

No.	Pos.	Nation	Player
17	DF	RUS	Vitali Kaleshin
18	MF	RUS	Vladimir Bystrov
20	FW	RUS	Nikolay Komlichenko
21	MF	COL	Ricardo Laborde
22	MF	BRA	Joãozinho
30	DF	RUS	Roman Shishkin (on loan from Lokomotiv Moscow)
33	MF	URU	Mauricio Pereyra
77	MF	BFA	Charles Kaboré
88	GK	RUS	Andrei Sinitsyn
90	FW	RUS	Fyodor Smolov
95	MF	RUS	Araik Ovsepyan
98	DF	RUS	Sergei Petrov

=== Out on loan ===
Note: Flags indicate national team as defined under FIFA eligibility rules; some limited exceptions apply. Players may hold more than one non-FIFA nationality.

No.	Pos.	Nation	Player
—	GK	RUS	Denis Kavlinov (at Dynamo St. Petersburg until 30 June 2017)
—	DF	RUS	Aleksandr Marchenko (at Spartak Nalchik until 30 June 2017)
—	DF	RUS	Maksim Starkov (at Dynamo St. Petersburg until 30 June 2017)
—	DF	NOR	Stefan Strandberg (at Hannover 96 until 30 June 2017)

No.	Pos.	Nation	Player
—	DF	RUS	Aleksandr Zhirov (at Anzhi Makhachkala until 30 June 2017)
—	MF	RUS	Ilya Borisov (at Armavir until 30 June 2017)
—	FW	BRA	Ari (at Lokomotiv Moscow until 30 June 2017)
—	FW	RUS	Ruslan Bolov (at Fakel Voronezh until 30 June 2017)

=== Reserve squad ===
Note: Flags indicate national team as defined under FIFA eligibility rules; some limited exceptions apply. Players may hold more than one non-FIFA nationality.

No.	Pos.	Nation	Player
32	DF	RUS	Vasili Cherov
35	FW	RUS	Alim Makoyev
36	MF	RUS	Andrei Tekuchyov
37	DF	RUS	Grigori Ziganshin
39	GK	RUS	Matvei Safonov
40	DF	RUS	Andrei Ivashin
41	DF	RUS	Aleksei Tatayev
42	DF	RUS	Dmitri Bubenin
43	FW	RUS	Daur Kvekveskiri
44	MF	RUS	Konstantin Samarenkin
45	DF	RUS	Igor Paradin
46	DF	RUS	Vitali Stezhko
47	MF	RUS	Daniil Utkin
49	FW	RUS	Dmitri Bakay
50	DF	RUS	Artyom Golubev
51	GK	RUS	Ivan Salnikov
52	GK	RUS	Yevgeni Latyshonok
53	MF	RUS	Aleksandr Chernikov
54	MF	RUS	Roman Kurazhov
57	FW	RUS	Ilya Nasonkin
58	MF	RUS	Aleksandr Sergeyev
61	DF	RUS	Ilya Martynov
62	MF	RUS	Aleks Matsukatov
63	FW	RUS	Nikita Sergeyev
64	MF	RUS	Aleksandr Morgunov

No.	Pos.	Nation	Player
65	DF	RUS	Nikolai Bochko
66	GK	RUS	Denis Adamov
67	FW	RUS	Maksim Kutovoy
69	MF	RUS	Denis Vasenin
71	FW	RUS	Aleksandr Butenko
72	FW	RUS	Rustam Khalnazarov
74	MF	RUS	Daniil Fomin
75	FW	RUS	Levon Bayramyan
76	FW	RUS	Ruslan Rzayev
78	FW	RUS	Dmitri Vorobyov
81	MF	RUS	Leon Sabua
82	DF	RUS	Sergei Borodin
83	MF	RUS	Inal Cherchesov
84	GK	RUS	Anton Fedyushkin
85	FW	RUS	Ivan Ignatyev
86	FW	RUS	Valeri Manko
87	DF	RUS	Arutyun Grigoryan
89	DF	RUS	Aleksey Shishkin
91	DF	RUS	Leo Goglichidze
92	MF	RUS	Ivan Takhmazov
93	FW	RUS	Magomed-Shapi Suleymanov
94	DF	RUS	Yevgeni Nazarov
95	FW	RUS	Aslan Vershinin
96	FW	RUS	Dmitri Yaskov
97	FW	RUS	Nurik Gadzhiyev

== Transfers ==
=== Summer ===
In: Note: Flags indicate national team as defined under FIFA eligibility rules; some limited exceptions apply. Players may hold more than one non-FIFA nationality.

No.	Pos.	Nation	Player
1	GK	RUS	Stanislav Kritsyuk (from (Portugal) Braga, previously on loan)
2	MF	RUS	Marat Izmailov (free agent)
3	DF	BRA	Naldo (from (Portugal) Sporting Lisbon)
4	DF	BLR	Alyaksandr Martynovich (end of loan to (Russia) Ural Sverdlovsk Oblast)
20	MF	RUS	Amir Natkho (from (Russia) CSKA Moscow)
32	DF	RUS	Vasili Cherov (end of loan to (Russia) Khimki)
34	MF	RUS	Kamil Zakirov
37	DF	RUS	Grigori Ziganshin
40	DF	RUS	Andrei Ivashin
42	DF	RUS	Dmitri Bubenin
44	MF	RUS	Konstantin Samarenkin
49	FW	RUS	Dmitri Bakay (end of loan to (Russia) Biolog-Novokubansk)
51	GK	RUS	Ivan Salnikov (from (Russia) Tom Tomsk academy)
53	MF	RUS	Aleksandr Chernikov
55	DF	POL	Artur Jędrzejczyk (end of loan to (Poland) Legia Warsaw)
61	DF	RUS	Ilya Martynov
65	DF	RUS	Nikolai Bochko
67	FW	RUS	Maksim Kutovoy
68	MF	RUS	Robert Babertsyan
70	MF	GEO	Tornike Okriashvili (from (Belgium) Genk)
72	FW	RUS	Rustam Khalnazarov
77	MF	BFA	Charles Kaboré (from (Russia) Kuban Krasnodar, previously on loan)
81	MF	RUS	Leon Sabua
86	FW	RUS	Valeri Manko
96	FW	RUS	Dmitri Yaskov

Out: Note: Flags indicate national team as defined under FIFA eligibility rules; some limited exceptions apply. Players may hold more than one non-FIFA nationality.

No.	Pos.	Nation	Player
3	DF	NOR	Stefan Strandberg (on loan to (Germany) Hannover 96)
15	DF	UZB	Nikolay Markov (to (Russia) Kuban Krasnodar)
27	DF	ISL	Ragnar Sigurðsson (to (England) Fulham)
31	GK	UKR	Andriy Dykan (retired)
40	FW	RUS	Alan Koroyev (to (Russia) Kolomna)
42	DF	RUS	Mikhail Tikhonov (to (Russia) Yenisey Krasnoyarsk)
47	MF	RUS	Ilya Zhigulyov (on loan to (Moldova) Milsami Orhei)
48	MF	RUS	Aleksandr Marchenko (on loan to (Russia) Spartak Nalchik)
51	GK	RUS	Denis Kavlinov (on loan to (Russia) Dynamo St. Petersburg)
53	FW	RUS	Pavel Marushko
56	FW	RUS	Ilya Belous
59	DF	RUS	Nikita Katayev
63	FW	RUS	Nikolai Komlichenko (on loan to (Czech Republic) Slovan Liberec)
68	FW	RUS	Andrei Batyutin (to (Russia) Ufa)
72	DF	RUS	Daniil Bochkaryov (to (Russia) Biolog-Novokubansk)
79	DF	RUS	Batraz Gurtsiyev
80	DF	RUS	Vladislav Sklyar (to (Russia) Biolog-Novokubansk)
81	DF	RUS	Yevgeni Nesterenko (to (Russia) Afips Afipsky)
83	DF	RUS	Maksim Starkov (on loan to (Russia) Dynamo St. Petersburg)
86	DF	RUS	Vasili Cherov (on loan to (Russia) Khimki)
96	MF	RUS	Ilya Borisov (on loan to (Russia) Armavir)
99	FW	RUS	Vladislav Bragin
—	MF	RUS	Oleg Lanin (on loan to (Russia) Yenisey Krasnoyarsk, previously on loan to (Russia) Baltika Kaliningrad)
—	FW	RUS	Ruslan Bolov (on loan to (Russia) Fakel Voronezh, previously on loan to (Russia) Volgar Astrakhan)
—	FW	RUS	Nikita Burmistrov (to (Russia) Arsenal Tula, previously on loan to (Russia) Ural Sverdlovsk Oblast)

=== Winter ===
In: Note: Flags indicate national team as defined under FIFA eligibility rules; some limited exceptions apply. Players may hold more than one non-FIFA nationality.

No.	Pos.	Nation	Player
12	DF	ECU	Cristian Ramírez (from (Hungary) Ferencvárosi)
15	MF	RUS	Ilya Zhigulyov (end of loan to (Moldova) Milsami Orhei)
16	MF	SWE	Viktor Claesson (from (Sweden) IF Elfsborg)
20	FW	RUS	Nikolay Komlichenko (end of loan to (Czech Republic) Slovan Liberec)
30	DF	RUS	Roman Shishkin (loan from (Russia) Lokomotiv Moscow)
31	GK	RUS	Sergei Yeshchenko
34	DF	RUS	Danil Pelikh
43	DF	RUS	Dmitri Ivanov
68	DF	RUS	Dmitri Kotov
95	MF	RUS	Araik Ovsepyan (from (Russia) Sibir Novosibirsk)
—	GK	RUS	Denis Kavlinov (end of loan to (Russia) Dynamo St. Petersburg)
—	DF	RUS	Aleksandr Zhirov (from (Russia) Tom Tomsk)

Out: Note: Flags indicate national team as defined under FIFA eligibility rules; some limited exceptions apply. Players may hold more than one non-FIFA nationality.

No.	Pos.	Nation	Player
2	MF	RUS	Marat Izmailov
9	FW	BRA	Ari (on loan to (Russia) Lokomotiv Moscow)
10	MF	UZB	Odil Ahmedov (to (China) SIPG)
20	MF	RUS	Amir Natkho (to (Russia) Lokomotiv Moscow)
34	MF	RUS	Kamil Zakirov (to (Russia) Anzhi Makhachkala)
38	MF	CIV	Kouassi Eboue (to (Scotland) Celtic)
43	FW	RUS	Daur Kvekveskiri
55	DF	POL	Artur Jędrzejczyk (to (Poland) Legia Warsaw)
64	MF	RUS	Aleksandr Morgunov (on loan to (Moldova) Milsami Orhei)
68	MF	RUS	Robert Babertsyan
73	FW	RUS	Roman Razzhivin
95	FW	RUS	Aslan Vershinin
—	DF	RUS	Aleksandr Zhirov (on loan to (Russia) Anzhi Makhachkala)

== Competitions ==
=== Russian Premier League ===
==== Results by round ====
Round	1	2	3	4	5	6	7	8	9	10	11	12	13	14	15	16	17	18	19	20	21	22	23	24	25	26	27	28	29	30
Ground	H	H	A	A	H	A	H	A	H	A	H	A	H	H	H	A	H	H	A	H	A	H	A	H	A	H	A	A	A	A
Result	W	W	D	L	L	D	W	D	W	D	W	D	D	W	W	L	D	D	W	D	D	D	W	W	W	D	L	D	L	W
Position	2	1	1	4	6	7	5	6	6	6	4	5	5	5	3	5	5	4	3	4	4	4	4	4	4	4	4	4	5	4

Updated to match(es) played on 21 May 2017. Source: See results
A = Away; H = Home; W = Win; D = Draw; L = Loss

==== Matches ====
1 August 2016 1	Krasnodar	3 – 0	Tom Tomsk	Krasnodar
19:30 MSK (UTC+3)	Ari (yellow card) 20' (goal) 57'; Smolov 44', 60'	Summary	Kombarov (yellow card) 50'; Tishkin (yellow card) 61'; Ciupercă (yellow card) 90' (yellow-red card) 90+2'	Stadium: Kuban Stadium; Attendance: 7,198; Referee: Igor Fedotov

8 August 2016 2	Krasnodar	4 – 0	Terek Grozny	Krasnodar
19:30 MSK (UTC+3)	Smolov 33', 77'; Kaboré (yellow card) 38'; Ari (yellow card) 39' (goal) 54'; Granqvist (yellow card) 73'; Wánderson 88'	Summary	Rodolfo (yellow card) 71'; Píriz (yellow card) 76'	Stadium: Kuban Stadium; Attendance: 7,930; Referee: Vladimir Seldyakov

13 August 2016 3	Krylia Sovetov	1 – 1	Krasnodar	Samara
18:00 MSK (UTC+3)	Rodić 3' (yellow card) 75'; Taranov (yellow card) 34'	Summary	Smolov 52'	Stadium: Metallurg Stadium; Attendance: 9,012; Referee: Alexey Nikolaev

21 August 2016 4	Spartak Moscow	2 – 0	Krasnodar	Moscow
18:00 MSK (UTC+3)	Luís 15', 74'; Fernando (yellow card) 66'; Kombarov (yellow card) 87'; Melgarejo (yellow card) 90+2'	Summary	Smolov (yellow card) 71'	Stadium: Otkrytiye Arena; Attendance: 31,035; Referee: Vladislav Bezborodov

28 August 2016 5	Krasnodar	1 – 2	Lokomotiv Moscow	Krasnodar
19:15 MSK (UTC+3)	Smolov 48' (pen.); Torbinski (yellow card) 90'	Summary	Samedov 41'; Ćorluka (yellow card) 45'; Henty 56' (pen.); Tarasov (yellow card) 78'; Denisov (yellow card) 85'	Stadium: Kuban Stadium; Attendance: 12,780; Referee: Sergey Lapochkin

11 September 2016 6	Ufa	0 – 0	Krasnodar	Ufa
14:00 MSK (UTC+3)	Krotov (yellow card) 59'; Oblyakov (yellow card) 76'; Igboun (yellow card) 83'	Summary	Petrov (yellow card) 88'	Stadium: Neftyanik Stadium; Attendance: 5,800; Referee: Vladimir Seldyakov

18 September 2016 7	Krasnodar	2 – 1	Rostov	Krasnodar
20:00 MSK (UTC+3)	Naldo 87'; Smolov 90+4' (pen.)	Summary	Navas 10'; Noboa (yellow card) 36'; Poloz (yellow card) 77'	Stadium: Kuban Stadium; Attendance: 6,425; Referee: Aleksey Eskov

24 September 2016 8	CSKA Moscow	1 – 1	Krasnodar	Moscow
17:00 MSK (UTC+3)	Traoré 3' (yellow card) 40'; Wernbloom (yellow card) 74'	Summary	Smolov 15'; Laborde (yellow card) 84'	Stadium: Arena CSKA; Attendance: 14,080; Referee: Sergey Ivanov

2 October 2016 9	Krasnodar	1 – 0	Rubin Kazan	Krasnodar
19:00 MSK (UTC+3)	Kaboré (yellow card) 28'; Ari (yellow card) 37' (goal) 45+1'	Summary	Zambrano (yellow card) 36'; Nabiullin (yellow card) 39'; Kanunnikov (yellow card) 88'	Stadium: Kuban Stadium; Attendance: 5,200; Referee: Igor Fedotov

16 October 2016 10	Arsenal Tula	0 – 0	Krasnodar	Tula
19:00 MSK (UTC+3)	Steklov (yellow card) 71'	Summary	Martynovich (yellow card) 80'	Stadium: Arsenal Stadium; Attendance: 7,500; Referee: Aleksey Eskov

23 October 2016 11	Krasnodar	1 – 0	Amkar Perm	Krasnodar
19:00 MSK (UTC+3)	Gazinsky 45+2'	Summary	Zaytsev (yellow card) 49'	Stadium: Krasnodar Stadium; Attendance: 14,900; Referee: Kirill Levnikov

30 October 2016 12	Anzhi Makhachkala	0 – 0	Krasnodar	Kaspiysk
18:30 MSK (UTC+3)	Xandão (yellow card) 55'; Obertan (yellow card) 90+2'	Summary	Kaboré (yellow card) 6' (yellow-red card) 17'; Izmailov (yellow card) 47'; Laborde (yellow card) 90+2'; Eboue (yellow card) 90+4'	Stadium: Anzhi Arena; Attendance: 7,203; Referee: Sergey Karasev

6 November 2016 13	Krasnodar	3 – 3	Orenburg	Krasnodar
19:30 MSK (UTC+3)	Pereyra 9'; Ari 11'; Kaleshin (yellow card) 20'; Eboue (red card) 44'; Martynovich 75'	Summary	Breyev 16'; Andreyev (yellow card) 19'; Poluyakhtov 21', 31'; Malykh (red card) 73'; Hutar (yellow card) 90+2'; Vorobyov (yellow card) 90+3'; Katsalapov (yellow card) 90+4'	Stadium: Krasnodar Stadium; Attendance: 22,415; Referee: Vitaly Meshkov

20 November 2016 14	Krasnodar	3 – 0	Ural Yekaterinburg	Krasnodar
14:30 MSK (UTC+3)	Gazinsky 66'; Smolov 71'; Joãozinho 74'	Summary	Dantsev (yellow card) 19'; Podoksyonov (yellow card) 64'	Stadium: Krasnodar Stadium; Attendance: 17,304; Referee: Mikhail Vilkov

27 November 2016 15	Krasnodar	2 – 1	Zenit St.Petersburg	Krasnodar
19:00 MSK (UTC+3)	Laborde (yellow card) 49'; Jędrzejczyk (yellow card) 75'; Izmailov (yellow card) 85' (goal) 90+2'; Torbinski (yellow card) 90'; Okriashvili 90+4'	Summary	Witsel (yellow card) 45'; García (yellow card) 80'; Dzyuba 86' (yellow card) 90+3'	Stadium: Krasnodar Stadium; Attendance: 31,854; Referee: Alexey Nikolaev

1 December 2016 16	Terek Grozny	2 – 1	Krasnodar	Grozny
18:00 MSK (UTC+3)	Píriz 25'; Grozav 33'	Summary	Torbinski (yellow card) 39'; Bystrov (yellow card) 43'; Ángel 72' (o.g.); Naldo (yellow card) 80'	Stadium: Akhmat-Arena; Attendance: 15,235; Referee: Igor Fedotov

5 December 2016 17	Krasnodar	1 – 1	Krylia Sovetov	Krasnodar
19:00 MSK (UTC+3)	Gazinsky (yellow card) 44'; Smolov 48'	Summary	Margasov (yellow card) 65'; Kornilenko 71'; Loria (yellow card) 86'; Yatchenko (yellow card) 90+4'	Stadium: Krasnodar Stadium; Attendance: 12,176; Referee: Evgeny Turbin

5 March 2017 18	Krasnodar	2 – 2	Spartak Moscow	Krasnodar
16:30 MSK (UTC+3)	Tasci 15' (o.g.); Smolov (yellow card) 63' (goal) 73' (pen.)	Summary	Fernando 3'; Glushakov (yellow card) 45+2'; Adriano 54'; Zobnin (yellow card) 68'; Zé Luís (yellow card) 90+3'	Stadium: Krasnodar Stadium; Attendance: 31,250; Referee: Vladislav Bezborodov

13 March 2017 19	Lokomotiv Moscow	1 – 2	Krasnodar	Moscow
19:30 MSK (UTC+3)	Ignatyev 36'	Summary	Mamayev 56'; Wánderson 64'; Sinitsyn (yellow card) 90+5'	Stadium: Lokomotiv Stadium; Attendance: 9,494; Referee: Vitaly Meshkov

19 March 2017 20	Krasnodar	0 – 0	Ufa	Krasnodar
16:30 MSK (UTC+3)		Summary	Putsko (yellow card) 36'; Stotsky (yellow card) 42'; Alikin (yellow card) 79'	Stadium: Krasnodar Stadium; Attendance: 15,365; Referee: Kirill Levnikov

3 April 2017 21	Rostov	0 – 0	Krasnodar	Rostov-on-Don
19:30 MSK (UTC+3)		Summary	Kaboré (yellow card) 39'; Martynovich (yellow card) 63'; Pereyra (yellow card) 78'; Smolov (yellow card) 90+3'	Stadium: Olimp-2; Attendance: 12,542; Referee: Evgeny Turbin

9 April 2017 22	Krasnodar	1 – 1	CSKA Moscow	Krasnodar
16:30 MSK (UTC+3)	Smolov 58' (pen.); Mamayev (yellow card) 62'	Summary	Wernbloom 72'; Fernandes (yellow card) 82'	Stadium: Kuban Stadium; Attendance: 31,165; Referee: Sergey Ivanov

15 April 2017 23	Rubin Kazan	0 – 1	Krasnodar	Kazan
19:30 MSK (UTC+3)	Sánchez (yellow card) 60'	Summary	Smolov 57'	Stadium: Kazan Arena; Attendance: 3,041; Referee: Mikhail Vilkov

23 April 2017 24	Krasnodar	2 – 0	Arsenal Tula	Krasnodar
17:00 MSK (UTC+3)	Kaboré 49'; Smolov 84'	Summary	Maksimov (yellow card) 24'; Vergara (yellow card) 82'	Stadium: Krasnodar Stadium; Attendance: 16,214; Referee: Aleksei Matyunin

27 April 2017 25	Amkar Perm	0 – 2	Krasnodar	Perm
17:00 MSK (UTC+3)	Gigolayev (yellow card) 81'	Summary	Smolov 63'; Wánderson 76'	Stadium: Zvezda Stadium; Attendance: 7,250; Referee: Aleksey Sukhoy

1 May 2017 26	Krasnodar	0 – 0	Anzhi Makhachkala	Krasnodar
18:00 MSK (UTC+3)	Pereyra (yellow card) 53'; Torbinski (yellow card) 82'	Summary	Guliyev (yellow card) 33'; Yakovlev (yellow card) 60'; Musalov (yellow card) 65'; Yurchenko (yellow card) 90+1'	Stadium: Krasnodar Stadium; Attendance: 27,658; Referee: Vladimir Seldyakov

7 May 2017 27	Orenburg	1 – 0	Krasnodar	Orenburg
14:00 MSK (UTC+3)	Parnyakov (yellow card) 40'; Afonin (yellow card) 40'; Lobjanidze 49'; Rudenko (yellow card) 86'	Summary	Smolov (yellow card) 38'; Wánderson (yellow card) 39'; Gazinsky (yellow card) 51'	Stadium: Gazovik Stadium; Attendance: 6,805; Referee: Mikhail Vilkov

13 May 2017 28	Ural Yekaterinburg	1 – 1	Krasnodar	Yekaterinburg
12:00 MSK (UTC+3)	Naldo 42' (o.g.)	Report	Pereyra (yellow card) 50'; Naldo (yellow card) 64'; Claesson 90+2'; Torbinski (yellow card) 90+4'	Stadium: SKB-Bank Arena; Attendance: 3,300; Referee: Alexey Nikolaev

17 May 2017 29	Zenit St.Petersburg	1 – 0	Krasnodar	Saint Petersburg
19:30 MSK (UTC+3)	Dzyuba 12'; García (yellow card) 60'; Yusupov (yellow card) 87'	Report	Kaboré (yellow card) 71'	Stadium: Petrovsky Stadium; Attendance: 18,098; Referee: Vladimir Seldyakov

21 May 2017 30	Tom Tomsk	1 – 5	Krasnodar	Tomsk
15:00 MSK (UTC+3)	Gvineysky (yellow card) 32'; Salakhutdinov (yellow card) 42'; Sobolev 49' (pen.); Sasin (yellow card) 51'; Naumenko (yellow card) 69'	Report	Smolov 17', 26', 79'; Pereyra 33'; Naldo 71'	Stadium: Trud Stadium; Attendance: 3,300; Referee: Evgeny Turbin

==== League table ====
Pos	Team	Pld	W	D	L	GF	GA	GD	Pts	Qualification or relegation
2	CSKA Moscow	30	18	8	4	47	15	+32	62	Qualification for the Champions League third qualifying round
3	Zenit Saint Petersburg	30	18	7	5	50	19	+31	61	Qualification for the Europa League third qualifying round
4	Krasnodar	30	12	13	5	40	22	+18	49	Qualification for the Europa League third qualifying round
5	Terek Grozny	30	14	6	10	38	35	+3	48	
6	Rostov	30	13	9	8	36	18	+18	48	

Source: Russian Premier League, Soccerway
Rules for classification: 1) Points; 2) Matches won; 3) Head-to-head points; 4) Head-to-head matches won; 5) Head-to-head goal difference; 6) Head-to-head goals scored; 7) Head-to-head away goals; 8) Goal difference; 9) Goals scored; 10) Away goals scored.

=== Russian Cup ===
21 September 2016 Round of 32	Spartak Nalchik	0 – 2	Krasnodar	Nalchik
17:00 MSK (UTC+3)	Makoyev (yellow card) 18'	Summary	Tatayev (yellow card) 23'; Ari 48'; Laborde 86'	Stadium: Spartak Stadium; Attendance: 1,000; Referee: Aleksey Sukhoy

27 October 2016 Round of 16	Krasnodar	3 – 2 (a.e.t.)	Orenburg	Krasnodar
19:00 MSK (UTC+3)	Granqvist 58', 100' (yellow card) 99'; Izmailov 67' (yellow card) 97'; Kaboré (yellow card) 76'	Summary	Bamba (yellow card) 26'; Afonin (yellow card) 27'; Breyev 56' (yellow card) 65'; Oyewole 59' (yellow card) 70' (yellow-red card) 106'; Vorobyov (yellow card) 60'; Andreyev (yellow card) 62'; Malykh (yellow card) 102'	Stadium: Krasnodar Stadium; Attendance: 18,236; Referee: Evgeny Turbin

28 February 2017 Quarterfinal	Ural Yekaterinburg	3 – 3 (a.e.t.) (4 – 3 p)	Krasnodar	Yekaterinburg
19:30 MSK (UTC+3)	Ilyin 34'; Bicfalvi 53', 65'; Kulakov (yellow card) 61'; Dantsev (yellow card) 74' (yellow-red card) 92'; Novikov (yellow card) 116'	Summary	Smolov 1'; Claesson 14', 32'; Naldo (yellow card) 43'; Laborde (yellow card) 76'; Granqvist (yellow card) 90'; Gazinsky (yellow card) 100'	Stadium: SKB-Bank Arena; Attendance: 10,201; Referee: Kirill Levnikov
	Penalties
	Bicfalvi (penalty scored); Manucharyan (penalty scored); Yemelyanov (penalty scored); Fidler (penalty scored)		Ramírez (penalty missed); Laborde (penalty scored); Granqvist (penalty scored); Smolov (penalty missed); Claesson (penalty scored)

=== UEFA Europa League ===
==== Qualifying rounds ====
28 July 2016 Third qualifying round 1st leg	Birkirkara (Malta)	0 – 3	(Russia) Krasnodar	Paola (Note: Birkirkara played their home matches at Hibernians Stadium, Paola, instead of their regular stadium National Stadium, Ta' Qali.), Malta
20:30 MSK (UTC+3)	Scicluna (yellow card) 21' (yellow-red card) 87'	Report	Gazinsky (yellow card) 7'; Pereyra (yellow card) 40'; Granqvist 45+1'; Smolov 75' (pen.); Laborde 89'	Stadium: Hibernians Stadium; Attendance: 1,560; Referee: Bart Vertenten (Belgium)

4 August 2016 Third qualifying round 2nd leg	Krasnodar (Russia)	3 – 1 (6 – 1 agg.)	(Malta) Birkirkara	Krasnodar, Russia
19:30 MSK (UTC+3)	Eboue 15' (yellow card) 57'; Joãozinho 37'; Laborde 38'	Report	Dimitrov (yellow card) 45'; Sciberras (yellow card) 58'; Jović 61'; Bubalović (yellow card) 90+1'	Stadium: Kuban Stadium; Attendance: 7,256; Referee: Aliyar Aghayev (Azerbaijan)

18 August 2016 Play-off round 1st leg	Krasnodar (Russia)	4 – 0	(Albania) Partizani Tirana	Krasnodar, Russia
19:30 MSK (UTC+3)	Joãozinho 18' (pen.); Jędrzejczyk (yellow card) 23' (goal) 45'; Smolov 27'; Granqvist (yellow card) 38'; Krasniqi 73' (o.g.)	Report	Trashi (yellow card) 60'	Stadium: Kuban Stadium; Attendance: 11,575; Referee: Gediminas Mažeika (Lithuania)

25 August 2016 Play-off round 2nd leg	Partizani Tirana (Albania)	0 – 0 (0 – 4 agg.)	(Russia) Krasnodar	Elbasan (Note: Partizani Tirana play their first qualifying round and play-off home matches at Elbasan Arena, Elbasan, instead of their regular stadium Selman Stërmasi Stadium, Tirana.), Albania
20:30 MSK (UTC+3)		Report	Pereyra (yellow card) 30'; Torbinski (yellow card) 45'; Eboue (yellow card) 51'; Vorobyov (yellow card) 67'	Stadium: Elbasan Arena; Attendance: 1,550; Referee: Jakob Kehlet (Denmark)

==== Group stage ====
Pos	Team	Pld	W	D	L	GF	GA	GD	Pts	Qualification	SCH	KRA	SAL	NCE
1	(Germany) Schalke 04	6	5	0	1	9	3	+6	15	Advance to knockout phase	—	2–0	3–1	2–0
2	(Russia) Krasnodar	6	2	1	3	8	8	0	7	Advance to knockout phase	0–1	—	1–1	5–2
3	(Austria) Red Bull Salzburg	6	2	1	3	6	6	0	7		2–0	0–1	—	0–1
4	(France) Nice	6	2	0	4	5	11	−6	6		0–1	2–1	0–2	—

Source: UEFA

15 September 2016 1	Red Bull Salzburg (Austria)	0 – 1	(Russia) Krasnodar	Wals-Siezenheim, Austria
22:05 (MSK)	Samassékou (yellow card) 67'; Soriano (yellow card) 90+5'	Report	Joãozinho 37'; Petrov (yellow card) 47' (yellow-red card) 71'; Kaboré (yellow card) 51'; Laborde (yellow card) 86'	Stadium: Red Bull Arena; Attendance: 6,507; Referee: Miroslav Zelinka (Czech Republic)

29 September 2016 2	Krasnodar (Russia)	5 – 2	(France) Nice	Krasnodar, Russia
20:00 (MSK)	Smolov 22'; Joãozinho 33', 65' (pen.); Naldo (yellow card) 50'; Granqvist (yellow card) 55'; Ari 86', 90+3' (yellow card) 86'	Report	Balotelli 43'; Seri (yellow card) 45+1'; Baysse (yellow card) 64'; Cardinale (yellow card) 69'; Cyprien 71'	Stadium: Krasnodar Stadium; Attendance: 10,750; Referee: Ivan Bebek (Croatia)

20 October 2016 3	Krasnodar (Russia)	0 – 1	(Germany) Schalke 04	Krasnodar, Russia
20:00 (MSK)	Gazinsky (yellow card) 90+3'	Report	Konoplyanka 11'; Naldo (yellow card) 70'; Di Santo (yellow card) 85'	Stadium: Krasnodar Stadium; Attendance: 33,550; Referee: Mark Clattenburg (England)

3 November 2016 4	Schalke 04 (Germany)	2 – 0	(Russia) Krasnodar	Gelsenkirchen
23:05 (MSK)	Rahman (yellow card) 18'; Caiçara 25'; Bentaleb 28'; Höwedes (yellow card) 33'; Nastasić (yellow card) 45+1'	Report	Laborde (yellow card) 53'; Eboue (yellow card) 73'	Stadium: Veltins-Arena; Attendance: 42,210; Referee: Slavko Vinčić (Slovenia)

24 November 2016 5	Krasnodar (Russia)	1 – 1	(Austria) Red Bull Salzburg	Krasnodar, Russia
21:00 (MSK)	Kaleshin (yellow card) 57'; Laborde (yellow card) 76'; Smolov 85'	Report	Dabour 37'; Berisha (yellow card) 42'	Stadium: Krasnodar Stadium; Attendance: 19,150; Referee: Liran Liany (Israel)

8 December 2016 6	Nice (France)	2 – 1	(Russia) Krasnodar	Nice
23:05 (MSK)	Balotelli (yellow card) 26'; Marcel (yellow card) 55'; Bosetti 64' (pen.); Le Marchand 77'	Report	Eboue (yellow card) 25'; Granqvist (yellow card) 41' (red card) 61'; Smolov 52'	Stadium: Allianz Riviera; Referee: Sandro Schärer (Switzerland)

==== Knockout stage ====
16 February 2017 Round of 32 1st Leg	Krasnodar (Russia)	1 – 0	(Turkey) Fenerbahçe	Krasnodar, Russia
19:00 MSK (UTC+3)	Claesson 4'; Podberyozkin (yellow card) 42'; Kaboré (yellow card) 48'; Kaleshin (yellow card) 63'	Report		Stadium: Krasnodar Stadium; Attendance: 32,460; Referee: Ivan Kružliak (Slovakia)

22 February 2017 Round of 32 2nd Leg	Fenerbahçe (Turkey)	1 – 1 (1 – 2 agg.)	(Russia) Krasnodar	Istanbul, Turkey
20:00 MSK (UTC+3)	Köybaşı (yellow card) 20'; Souza 41' (yellow card) 43'; Lens (yellow card) 45+1'; Sow (yellow card) 66'	Report	Smolov 7'; Gazinsky (yellow card) 58'; Kaleshin (yellow card) 66'; Kaboré (yellow card) 75'; Pereyra (yellow card) 82'	Stadium: Şükrü Saracoğlu Stadium; Referee: Paweł Raczkowski (Poland)

9 March 2017 Round of 16 1st Leg	Celta Vigo (Spain)	2 – 1	(Russia) Krasnodar	Vigo, Spain
23:05 MSK (UTC+3)	Wass 50'; Beauvue 90'	Report	Claesson (yellow card) 24' (goal) 56'	Stadium: Balaídos; Attendance: 18,414; Referee: Craig Thomson (Scotland)

16 March 2017 Round of 16 2nd Leg	Krasnodar (Russia)	0 – 2 (1 – 4 agg.)	(Spain) Celta Vigo	Krasnodar, Russia
21:00 MSK (UTC+3)	Kaboré (yellow card) 21' (yellow-red card) 86'; Gazinsky (yellow card) 42'; Granqvist (yellow card) 43'; Wánderson (yellow card) 46'	Report	Mallo 52'; Radoja (yellow card) 54'; Aspas 80'	Stadium: Krasnodar Stadium; Referee: Ruddy Buquet (France)

== Squad statistics ==
As of match played 21 May 2017

=== Appearances and goals ===
No.	Pos	Nat	Player	Total		Premier League		Russian Cup		Europa League	
No.	Pos	Nat	Player	Apps	Goals	Apps	Goals	Apps	Goals	Apps	Goals
1	GK	(Russia) RUS	Stanislav Kritsyuk	31	0	20	0	1	0	10	0
3	DF	(Brazil) BRA	Naldo	24	2	14	2	1	0	9	0
4	DF	(Belarus) BLR	Alyaksandr Martynovich	24	1	14	1	2	0	8	0
5	MF	(Russia) RUS	Dmitri Torbinski	22	0	7+6	0	1	0	6+2	0
6	DF	(Sweden) SWE	Andreas Granqvist	42	3	28	0	2	2	12	1
7	MF	(Russia) RUS	Pavel Mamayev	16	1	7+5	1	1	0	0+3	0
8	MF	(Russia) RUS	Yury Gazinsky	44	2	28+1	2	2+1	0	6+6	0
11	MF	(Russia) RUS	Vyacheslav Podberyozkin	25	0	8+6	0	2	0	9	0
12	DF	(Ecuador) ECU	Cristian Ramírez	15	0	10+1	0	1	0	3	0
14	MF	(Brazil) BRA	Wánderson	21	3	8+6	3	1	0	5+1	0
15	MF	(Russia) RUS	Ilya Zhigulyov	9	0	4+3	0	0+1	0	1	0
16	MF	(Sweden) SWE	Viktor Claesson	18	5	13	1	1	2	4	2
17	DF	(Russia) RUS	Vitali Kaleshin	26	0	17	0	2	0	4+3	0
18	MF	(Russia) RUS	Vladimir Bystrov	12	0	2+6	0	1+1	0	2	0
21	MF	(Colombia) COL	Ricardo Laborde	27	3	3+10	0	1+2	1	1+10	2
22	MF	(Brazil) BRA	Joãozinho	33	6	9+12	1	0+1	0	9+2	5
30	DF	(Russia) RUS	Roman Shishkin	7	0	5+1	0	1	0	0	0
33	MF	(Uruguay) URU	Mauricio Pereyra	31	2	16+5	2	0	0	7+3	0
41	DF	(Russia) RUS	Aleksei Tatayev	1	0	0	0	1	0	0	0
64	MF	(Russia) RUS	Aleksandr Morgunov	1	0	0	0	1	0	0	0
70	MF	(Georgia (country)) GEO	Tornike Okriashvili	13	1	2+9	1	1+1	0	0	0
74	MF	(Russia) RUS	Daniil Fomin	1	0	0	0	1	0	0	0
77	MF	(Burkina Faso) BFA	Charles Kaboré	33	1	21+1	1	0+1	0	10	0
78	FW	(Russia) RUS	Dmitri Vorobyov	1	0	0	0	0	0	0+1	0
88	GK	(Russia) RUS	Andrei Sinitsyn	18	0	10+2	0	2	0	4	0
90	FW	(Russia) RUS	Fyodor Smolov	31	25	21+1	18	1	1	8	6
91	DF	(Russia) RUS	Leo Goglichidze	1	0	0	0	1	0	0	0
98	MF	(Russia) RUS	Sergei Petrov	25	0	15+2	0	2	0	6	0
Players away from the club on loan:
3	DF	(Norway) NOR	Stefan Strandberg	3	0	1	0	0	0	2	0
9	FW	(Brazil) BRA	Ari	19	7	11	4	2	1	4+2	2
Players who left Krasnodar during the season:
2	MF	(Russia) RUS	Marat Izmailov	11	2	6+1	1	1	1	1+2	0
10	MF	(Uzbekistan) UZB	Odil Ahmedov	24	0	8+6	0	0+1	0	8+1	0
27	DF	(Iceland) ISL	Ragnar Sigurðsson	3	0	3	0	0	0	0	0
38	MF	(Ivory Coast) CIV	Kouassi Eboue	18	1	7+2	0	0	0	8+1	1
55	DF	(Poland) POL	Artur Jędrzejczyk	21	1	12+1	0	0	0	7+1	1

=== Goal Scorers ===
Place	Position	Nation	Number	Name	Russian Premier League	Russian Cup	UEFA Europa League	Total
1	FW	(Russia)	10	Fyodor Smolov	18	1	6	25
2	FW	(Brazil)	9	Ari	4	1	2	7
3	MF	(Brazil)	22	Joãozinho	1	0	5	6
4	MF	(Sweden)	16	Viktor Claesson	1	2	2	5
5	FW	(Brazil)	14	Wánderson	3	0	0	3
5	DF	(Sweden)	6	Andreas Granqvist	0	2	1	3
5	MF	(Colombia)	21	Ricardo Laborde	0	1	2	3
5				Own goal	2	0	1	3
9	MF	(Russia)	8	Yury Gazinsky	2	0	0	2
9	DF	(Brazil)	3	Naldo	2	0	0	2
9	MF	(Uruguay)	33	Mauricio Pereyra	2	0	0	2
9	MF	(Russia)	2	Marat Izmailov	1	1	0	2
12	DF	(Belarus)	4	Alyaksandr Martynovich	1	0	0	1
12	MF	(Georgia (country))	70	Tornike Okriashvili	1	0	0	1
12	MF	(Russia)	7	Pavel Mamayev	1	0	0	1
12	MF	(Burkina Faso)	77	Charles Kaboré	1	0	0	1
12	MF	(Ivory Coast)	38	Kouassi Eboue	0	0	1	1
12	DF	(Poland)	55	Artur Jędrzejczyk	0	0	1	1
				TOTALS	40	8	21	68

=== Disciplinary record ===
Number	Nation	Position	Name	Russian Premier League		Russian Cup		UEFA Europa League		Total	
Number	Nation	Position	Name	Yellow card	Red card	Yellow card	Red card	Yellow card	Red card	Yellow card	Red card
2	(Russia)	MF	Marat Izmailov	2	0	1	0	0	0	3	0
3	(Russia)	MF	Naldo	2	0	1	0	1	0	4	0
4	(Belarus)	DF	Alyaksandr Martynovich	2	0	0	0	0	0	2	0
5	(Russia)	MF	Dmitri Torbinski	4	0	0	0	1	0	5	0
6	(Sweden)	DF	Andreas Granqvist	1	0	2	0	4	1	7	1
7	(Russia)	MF	Pavel Mamayev	1	0	0	0	0	0	1	0
8	(Russia)	MF	Yury Gazinsky	2	0	1	0	4	0	7	0
9	(Brazil)	FW	Ari	3	0	0	0	1	0	4	0
11	(Russia)	MF	Vyacheslav Podberyozkin	0	0	0	0	1	0	1	0
14	(Russia)	FW	Wánderson	1	0	0	0	1	0	2	0
16	(Sweden)	MF	Viktor Claesson	0	0	0	0	1	0	1	0
17	(Russia)	DF	Vitali Kaleshin	2	0	0	0	4	0	6	0
18	(Russia)	MF	Vladimir Bystrov	1	0	0	0	0	0	1	0
21	(Colombia)	MF	Ricardo Laborde	3	0	1	0	3	0	7	0
33	(Uruguay)	MF	Mauricio Pereyra	3	0	0	0	3	0	6	0
38	(Ivory Coast)	MF	Kouassi Eboue	1	1	0	0	4	0	5	1
41	(Russia)	DF	Aleksei Tatayev	0	0	1	0	0	0	1	0
55	(Poland)	DF	Artur Jędrzejczyk	1	0	0	0	1	0	2	0
77	(Burkina Faso)	MF	Charles Kaboré	6	1	1	0	5	1	12	2
78	(Russia)	FW	Dmitri Vorobyov	0	0	0	0	1	0	1	0
88	(Russia)	GK	Andrei Sinitsyn	1	0	0	0	0	0	1	0
90	(Russia)	FW	Fyodor Smolov	4	0	0	0	0	0	4	0
98	(Russia)	MF	Sergei Petrov	1	0	0	0	2	1	3	1
			TOTALS	40	2	8	0	35	3	83	5
