= Eboue Kouassi =

Ivorian footballer (born 1997)

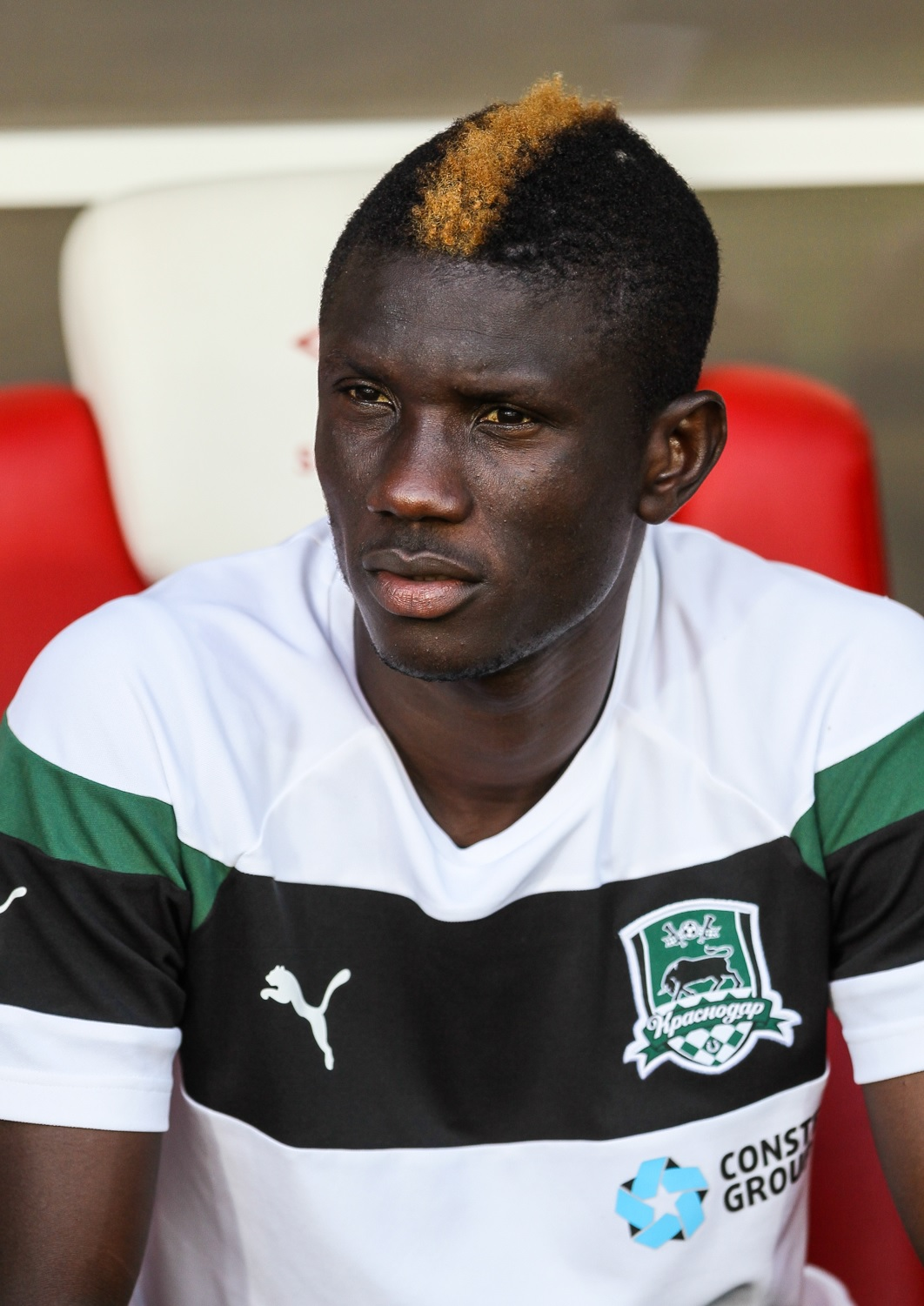
- Kouassi with Krasnodar in 2016

Personal information
- Full name: Jules Christ Eboue Kouassi
- Date of birth: 13 December 1997 (age 28)
- Place of birth: Abidjan, Ivory Coast
- Height: 1.85 m (6 ft 1 in)
- Position: Defensive midfielder

Team information
- Current team: União de Leiria
- Number: 8

Youth career
- 2010–2014: Académie Symbiose Foot d'Abobo
- 2014: Shirak
- 2014–2016: Krasnodar

Senior career*
Years	Team	Apps	(Gls)
2016–2017	Krasnodar	10	(0)
2017–2020	Celtic	22	(0)
2020	→ Genk (loan)	4	(0)
2020–2023	Genk	18	(0)
2021–2022	→ Arouca (loan)	19	(1)
2023	Jong Genk	2	(0)
2023–2025	Arouca	25	(0)
2025–	União de Leiria	19	(1)

International career
2021	Ivory Coast Olympic	1	(0)
- * Club domestic league appearances and goals as of 19 June 2026

Jules Christ Eboue Kouassi (born 13 December 1997) is an Ivorian professional footballer who plays as a defensive midfielder for Liga Portugal 2 club União de Leiria.

== Club career ==
=== Early career ===
Kouassi played for Académie Symbiose Foot d'Abobo in the Ivory Coast before moving to Armenian club Shirak in early 2014. In the summer of 2014 he joined the youth system of Russian club Krasnodar.

=== Krasnodar ===
In December 2015, Kouassi signed a new contract with Krasnodar. Kouassi made his debut for Krasnodar on 21 May 2016, in a 1–0 victory against Amkar Perm in the Russian Premier League. He became a regular the following season, 2016–17, playing in a total of 18 matches by the end of December 2016 and helping his side to fifth place in the league. During this time, Kouassi also scored his first goal; opening the scoring in a 3–0 win over Maltese side Birkirkara in a UEFA Europa League tie on 4 August 2016.

=== Celtic ===
On 3 January 2017, it was reported that Scottish Premiership club Celtic had agreed a transfer fee of around £3 million with Krasnodar to sign Eboue Kouassi. Celtic announced the signing of Kouassi on a four-year-contract, subject to obtaining a visa, on 12 January 2017.

Kouassi made 22 first-team appearances for Celtic in his first three years with the club. He was loaned to Belgian club Genk in January 2020.

=== Genk ===
Kouassi signed for Genk on 1 July 2020, for €1.5 million.

=== Arouca ===
On 31 August 2021, Kouassi was loaned to Arouca. On 7 July 2023, Arouca announced the free signing of Kouassi on a free transfer, with the player signing a two-year deal.

=== União de Leiria ===
On 4 February 2025, Kouassi signed with Liga Portugal 2 club União de Leiria until the end of the season.

== International career ==
Kouassi was called up to the Ivory Coast national team for the first time in November 2016, for a 2018 World Cup qualification match against Morocco and a friendly against France. However, he was an unused substitute in both matches.

== Career statistics ==
As of match played 1 February 2020

Appearances and goals by club, season and competition
Club	Season	League			National Cup		League Cup		Continental		Other		Total	
Club	Season	Division	Apps	Goals	Apps	Goals	Apps	Goals	Apps	Goals	Apps	Goals	Apps	Goals
Krasnodar	2015–16	Russian Premier League	1	0	0	0	–		0	0	–		1	0
Krasnodar	2016–17	Russian Premier League	9	0	0	0	–		9	1	–		18	1
Krasnodar	Total		10	0	0	0	–		9	1	–		19	1
Celtic	2016–17	Scottish Premiership	4	0	1	0	0	0	–		–		5	0
Celtic	2017–18	Scottish Premiership	6	0	2	0	1	0	3	0	–		12	0
Celtic	2018–19	Scottish Premiership	2	0	0	0	1	0	2	0	–		5	0
Celtic	2019–20	Scottish Premiership	0	0	0	0	0	0	0	0	–		0	0
Celtic	Total		12	0	3	0	2	0	5	0	–		22	0
Genk (loan)	2019–20	Jupiler Pro League	1	0	0	0	–		0	0	0	0	1	0
Career total			23	0	4	0	1	0	14	1	–		42	1

== Honours ==
Celtic

- Scottish Premiership: 2016–17, 2017–18, 2018–19
- Scottish Cup: 2016–17, 2017–18
- Scottish League Cup: 2017–18, 2018–19
