= Amidžić =

Origin
- Languages: Bosnian, Serbian from Turkish
- Meaning: son of the paternal uncle, paternal cousin
- Region of origin: Bosnia and Herzegovina, Serbia, Croatia

Other names
- Variant form: Amcaoğlu

Amidžić is a Bosnian, Serbian surname. Its literal meaning of "descendant of the amca (paternal uncle)" is similar to that of the Turkish family name Amcaoğlu. Notable people with the name include:

- Zoran Amidžić (born 1964), former Serbian footballer
