= Aleksey Antonyuk =

Russian footballer and manager

Personal information
- Full name: Aleksey Valeryevich Antonyuk
- Date of birth: 28 April 1984 (age 42)
- Position: Goalkeeper

Team information
- Current team: Sabah (GK coach)

Senior career*
Years	Team	Apps	(Gls)
2000–2001	Lada-2 Tolyatti		
2003	NTTs Tolyatti		
2004	FC Uslada Zhigulyovsk		
2005	NTTs Tolyatti		

Managerial career
- 2006: Krylia Sovetov-SOK (GK coach)
- 2009: Tolyatti (GK coach)
- 2010: Akademiya Tolyatti (GK coach)
- 2011–2013: Konoplyov football academy (GK coach)
- 2013–2014: Kuban Krasnodar (U19 GK coach)
- 2014–2016: Strogino Moscow (GK coach)
- 2017–2022: Krasnodar (GK coach)
- 2022–2024: Rodina Moscow (GK coach)
- 2024–: Sabah (GK coach)
- * Club domestic league appearances and goals

Aleksey Valeryevich Antonyuk (Russian: Алексей Валерьевич Антонюк; born 28 April 1984) is a Russian football coach and a former player. He is the goalkeepers coach with Azerbaijani club Sabah.

== Coaching career ==
Following a short playing career at amateur levels, Antonyuk became a goalkeeping coach. On 10 January 2017, Antonyuk was hired by Russian Premier League club FC Krasnodar. On 2 March 2022, he was appointed caretaker manager of Krasnodar, following the resignation of Daniel Farke and his assistants. Before the Krasnodar game against FC Ural Yekaterinburg, Aleksandr Storozhuk was registered with the league as the caretaker.
