= Aleksei Tatayev =

Russian footballer

Personal information
- Full name: Aleksei Gochayevich Tatayev
- Date of birth: 8 October 1998 (age 28)
- Place of birth: Tskhinvali, South Ossetia
- Height: 1.85 m (6 ft 1 in)
- Position: Centre back

Team information
- Current team: Orenburg
- Number: 5

Senior career*
Years	Team	Apps	(Gls)
2015–2019	Krasnodar	0	(0)
2015–2018	→ Krasnodar-2	62	(3)
2018	→ Krasnodar-3	2	(0)
2019	→ Mladá Boleslav (loan)	22	(1)
2019	→ Mladá Boleslav B (loan)	2	(0)
2020–2021	Mladá Boleslav	25	(2)
2021–2025	Alania Vladikavkaz	42	(3)
2023	→ Okzhetpes (loan)	25	(2)
2025–	Orenburg	33	(1)

International career^{‡}
2014	Russia U16	2	(0)
2014–2015	Russia U17	20	(3)
2015–2016	Russia U18	7	(1)
2016	Russia U19	4	(0)
2020	Russia U21	3	(0)
- * Club domestic league appearances and goals as of 8 November 2026 ‡ National team caps and goals as of 17 November 2020

Aleksei Gochayevich Tatayev (Russian: Алексей Гочаевич Татаев; born 8 October 1998) is a Russian football player who plays for Orenburg.

== Club career ==
Tatayev made his debut in the Russian Professional Football League for Krasnodar-2 on 15 April 2015 in a game against Alania Vladikavkaz.

He made his debut for the main squad of Krasnodar in the Russian Cup game against Spartak Nalchik on 21 September 2016.

On 10 January 2019, Tatayev joined Czech club Mladá Boleslav until December 2019.

On 11 December 2019, he moved to Mladá Boleslav on a permanent basis.

On 8 January 2025, Tatayev signed with Russian Premier League club Orenburg. He made his RPL debut for Orenburg on 2 March 2025 against Spartak Moscow.

== International career ==
Tatayev was part of the Russian squad which reached the semi-finals of the 2015 UEFA European Under-17 Championship in Bulgaria. In the quarter-finals on 16 May at Lazur Stadium in Burgas, his first-half header was the only goal of the game, eliminating holders England.

== Career statistics ==
As of 8 November 2026

Club	Season	League			Cup		Continental		Other		Total	
Club	Season	Division	Apps	Goals	Apps	Goals	Apps	Goals	Apps	Goals	Apps	Goals
Krasnodar-2	2014–15	Russian Second League	4	0	–		–		–		4	0
Krasnodar-2	2015–16	Russian Second League	7	0	–		–		1 (Note: Appearances in the FNL Cup)	0	8	0
Krasnodar-2	2016–17	Russian Second League	23	1	–		–		–		23	1
Krasnodar-2	2017–18	Russian Second League	12	2	–		–		3	0	15	2
Krasnodar-2	2018–19	Russian First League	16	0	–		–		–		16	0
Krasnodar-2	Total		62	3	0	0	0	0	4	0	66	3
Krasnodar	2015–16	Russian Premier League	0	0	–		–		–		0	0
Krasnodar	2016–17	Russian Premier League	0	0	1	0	0	0	–		1	0
Krasnodar	Total		0	0	1	0	0	0	0	0	1	0
Krasnodar-3	2018–19	Russian Second League	2	0	–		–		–		2	0
Mladá Boleslav (loan)	2018–19	Czech First League	10	0	–		–		–		10	0
Mladá Boleslav (loan)	2019–20	Czech First League	12	1	2	1	–		–		14	2
Mladá Boleslav (loan)	Total		22	1	2	1	0	0	0	0	24	2
Mladá Boleslav B (loan)	2019–20	Bohemian Football League	2	0	–		–		–		2	0
Mladá Boleslav	2019–20	Czech First League	11	0	1	0	–		–		12	0
Mladá Boleslav	2020–21	Czech First League	14	2	1	0	–		–		15	2
Mladá Boleslav	Total		25	2	2	0	0	0	0	0	27	2
Alania Vladikavkaz	2021–22	Russian First League	14	2	2	0	–		–		16	2
Alania Vladikavkaz	2022–23	Russian First League	9	1	3	0	–		–		12	1
Alania Vladikavkaz	2024–25	Russian First League	19	0	1	0	–		–		20	0
Alania Vladikavkaz	Total		42	3	6	0	0	0	0	0	48	3
Okzhetpes (loan)	2023	Kazakhstan Premier League	25	2	2	0	–		–		27	2
Orenburg	2024–25	Russian Premier League	9	1	–		–		–		9	1
Orenburg	2025–26	Russian Premier League	11	0	5	1	–		–		16	1
Orenburg	2026–27	Russian Premier League	13	0	0	0	–		–		13	0
Orenburg	Total		33	1	5	1	0	0	0	0	38	2
Career total			213	12	18	2	0	0	4	0	235	14
