= Nikolai Bochko =

Russian footballer

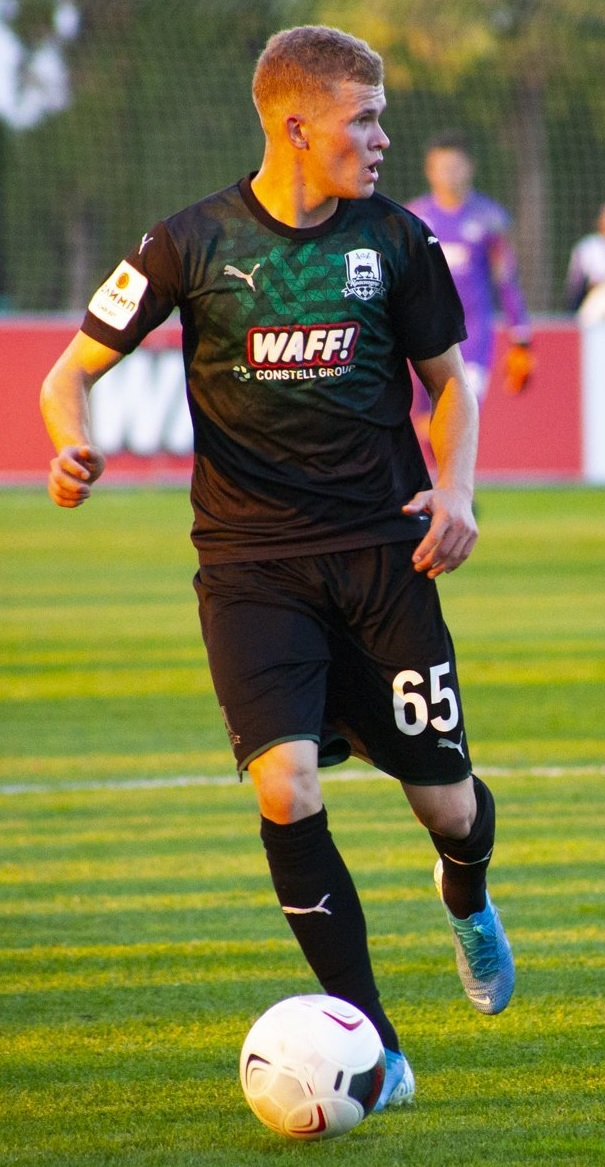
- Bochko with Krasnodar-2 in 2019

Personal information
- Full name: Nikolai Nikolayevich Bochko
- Date of birth: 1 March 1999 (age 27)
- Place of birth: Tuapse, Russia
- Height: 1.80 m (5 ft 11 in)
- Position: Right-back

Team information
- Current team: FC BATE Borisov
- Number: 23

Youth career
- 2016–2019: FC Krasnodar

Senior career*
Years	Team	Apps	(Gls)
2018–2021	FC Krasnodar-2	68	(0)
2018–2021	FC Krasnodar-3	19	(0)
2020	FC Krasnodar	0	(0)
2021–2023	FC SKA Rostov-on-Don	23	(0)
2023–2026	FC Dynamo Kirov	74	(4)
2026	FC Tekstilshchik Ivanovo	9	(0)
2026–	FC BATE Borisov	5	(0)

International career^{‡}
2017	Russia U-19	3	(0)
2017	Russia U-20	1	(0)
- * Club domestic league appearances and goals as of 3 September 2026 ‡ National team caps and goals as of 9 October 2017

Nikolai Nikolayevich Bochko (Russian: Николай Николаевич Бочко; born 1 March 1999) is a Russian football player.

== Club career ==
He made his debut in the Russian Professional Football League for FC Krasnodar-2 on 15 May 2018 in a game against FC Afips Afipsky. He made his Russian Football National League debut for Krasnodar-2 on 4 August 2018 in a game against FC Tyumen.
