= Nurbiy Khakunov =

Russian football, coach, and director

Personal information
- Full name: Nurbiy Khasambiyevich Khakunov
- Date of birth: 1 November 1954 (age 71)

Team information
- Current team: Krasnodar (technical director)

Senior career*
Years	Team	Apps	(Gls)
1977	Avangard Rovno	9	(0)
1978	Pribor Lutsk		

Managerial career
- 1981–1983: Druzhba Maykop (assistant)
- 1984–1985: Spartak Nalchik (assistant)
- 1986: Spartak Nalchik (director)
- 1992–1993: Druzhba Maykop
- 1993: Meoty Tulsky
- 1997: Torpedo Armavir
- 1998: Kuzbass Kemerovo (director)
- 2002: Nart Cherkessk
- 2006: Druzhba Maykop (president)
- 2008: Krasnodar (director)
- 2008–2009: Krasnodar
- 2010–: Krasnodar (technical director)
- * Club domestic league appearances and goals

Nurbiy Khasambiyevich Khakunov (Russian: Нурбий Хасамбиевич Хакунов; born 1 November 1954) is a Russian professional football coach and a former player who is a technical director with Krasnodar.
