= Araik Ovsepyan =

Russian footballer

Personal information
- Full name: Araik Rubikovich Ovsepyan
- Date of birth: 26 January 1995 (age 31)
- Place of birth: Novosibirsk, Russia
- Height: 1.75 m (5 ft 9 in)
- Position: Midfielder

Senior career*
Years	Team	Apps	(Gls)
2014–2016	Sibir-2 Novosibirsk	29	(4)
2016	Sibir Novosibirsk	11	(0)
2017	Krasnodar-2	28	(3)
- * Club domestic league appearances and goals

Araik Rubikovich Ovsepyan (Russian: Араик Рубикович Овсепян; born 26 January 1995) is a Russian former football player.

== Career ==
Ovsepyan made his professional debut in the Russian Professional Football League for FC Sibir-2 Novosibirsk on 31 August 2014 in a game against FC Irtysh Omsk.

He made his Russian Football National League debut for FC Sibir Novosibirsk on 11 July 2016 in a game against FC Spartak-2 Moscow.

On 12 January 2017, Ovsepyan signed for FC Krasnodar until December 2021.
