= Dmitri Ivanov (footballer, born 2000) =

Russian footballer

Personal information
- Full name: Dmitri Igorevich Ivanov
- Date of birth: 6 September 2000 (age 26)
- Place of birth: Slavyansk-na-Kubani, Russia
- Height: 1.86 m (6 ft 1 in)
- Position: Centre-back

Team information
- Current team: FC Volgar Astrakhan
- Number: 13

Youth career
- 2017–2019: FC Krasnodar

Senior career*
| Years | Team | Apps | (Gls) |
| 2017–2024 | FC Krasnodar-2 | 72 | (2) |
| 2018–2021 | FC Krasnodar-3 | 21 | (1) |
| 2024 | FC KAMAZ Naberezhnye Chelny | 5 | (0) |
| 2024–2025 | FC Sokol Saratov | 23 | (0) |
| 2025– | FC Volgar Astrakhan | 18 | (1) |
- * Club domestic league appearances and goals as of 15 November 2026

Dmitri Igorevich Ivanov (Russian: Дмитрий Игоревич Иванов; born 6 September 2000) is a Russian football player who plays for FC Volgar Astrakhan.

== Club career ==
He made his debut in the Russian Football National League for FC Krasnodar-2 on 4 October 2020 in a game against FC Nizhny Novgorod.
