= Andrei Ivashin =

Russian footballer

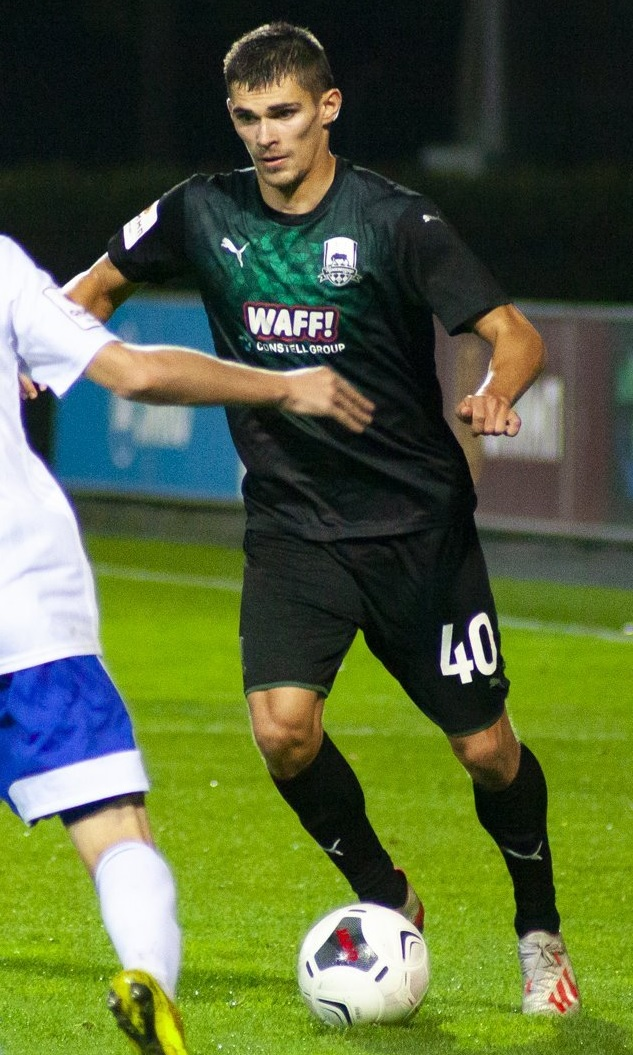
- Ivashin with Krasnodar-2 in 2019

Personal information
- Full name: Andrei Yevgenyevich Ivashin
- Date of birth: 30 June 1999 (age 27)
- Place of birth: Armavir, Russia
- Height: 1.81 m (5 ft 11 in)
- Position: Left-back

Team information
- Current team: PFC Spartak Nalchik
- Number: 40

Youth career
- 2016–2021: FC Krasnodar

Senior career*
Years	Team	Apps	(Gls)
2017–2021	FC Krasnodar-2	89	(2)
2018–2021	FC Krasnodar-3	8	(0)
2020	FC Krasnodar	0	(0)
2021–2024	FC Chayka Peschanokopskoye	62	(1)
2024–2025	FC Forte Taganrog	13	(0)
2025–2026	FC Murom	14	(0)
2026	FC Pobeda Nizhny Novgorod	13	(0)
2026–	PFC Spartak Nalchik	5	(0)

International career^{‡}
2014	Russia U-15	2	(0)
2015	Russia U-16	3	(0)
- * Club domestic league appearances and goals as of 31 October 2026 ‡ National team caps and goals as of 5 June 2015

Andrei Yevgenyevich Ivashin (Russian: Андрей Евгеньевич Ивашин; born 30 June 1999) is a Russian football player who plays for PFC Spartak Nalchik.

== Club career ==
He made his debut in the Russian Professional Football League for FC Krasnodar-2 on 2 September 2017 in a game against FC Legion-Dynamo Makhachkala. He made his Russian Football National League debut for Krasnodar-2 on 17 July 2018 in a game against FC Sibir Novosibirsk.
