= FC Arsenal Tula =

Russian football club

Arsenal Tula
- Full name: АНО «Профессиональный футбольный клуб «Арсенал», Тула»
- Nicknames: Krasno-zholtyye (Red-yellows); Kanoniri (Canoneers); Pryaniki (Gingercakes); Pushkari (The Gunners); Oruzheyniki (Gunsmiths); Samovars
- Founded: 1946; 80 years ago
- Ground: Arsenal Stadium
- Capacity: 19,241
- Owner: Valery Grinkovsky
- Chairman: Alexander Zotov
- Manager: Dmitri Alenichev
- League: Russian First League
- 2025–26: 13th of 18
- Website: arsenaltula.ru

FC Arsenal Tula (Russian: ФК Арсенал Тула) is a Russian professional football club from Tula playing in the second-tier Russian First League.

Originally founded in 1923, FC Arsenal Tula was promoted to the Russian Premier League in 2014 for the first time in its history after finishing as runners-up in the 2013–14 Russian National Football League. This achievement marked three successive promotions for the club. On its debut season in the 2014–15 Russian Premier League, it finished in last place and was relegated back to the FNL. The club spent one season in the FNL before returning to the Premier League for the 2016–17 season, in which they have competed until the 2021–22 Russian Premier League season, when they were relegated again after finishing last.

The team currently plays its home games in Arsenal Stadium, which has a capacity of 19,241.

== History ==
=== Team name history ===
- 1946–58: FC Zenit Tula
- 1959–61: FC Trud Tula
- 1962–63: FC Shakhtyor Tula
- 1964–74: FC Metallurg Tula
- 1975–79: FC Mashinostroitel Tula
- 1980–83: FC TOZ Tula
- 1984–2006: FC Arsenal Tula
- 2007: FC Oruzheynik Tula (formed based on the squad and staff of FC Arsenal Tula, but was not a legal successor to Arsenal)
- 2008–11: FC Arsenal-Tula (formed based on the squad and staff of FC Oruzheynik Tula, but was not a legal successor to Oruzheynik)
- 2011–: FC Arsenal Tula

=== Early years ===
Arsenal Tula played their first season in the USSR Championship in 1946 under the name Zenit Tula, competing in the Central Division of the RSFSR Championship, and finished 5th in their debut season. The precursors to Arsenal Tula played mainly in the Soviet Second League and never played in the Soviet Top League. The club was the champion of Zone West of the Russian Professional Football League in 1997 and 2003 and competed in the Russian Football National League from 1998 until 2001 and in 2004. In 2005, Arsenal Tula did not receive an FNL license due to financial difficulties and once again competed in Zone West in the PFL. In 2006 the team FC Arsenal Tula was liquidated, and FC Oruzheynik Tula was formed in its place, playing in the Amateur Division. In 2011, it was announced that the team FC Arsenal Tula would be reformed.

=== Recent history ===
The present-day team FC Arsenal Tula was formed at the end of 2011, replacing the former team FC Arsenal-Tula. The first coach of Arsenal was the famous Russian footballer Dmitri Alenichev and the coaching staff included Dmitri Ananko, Oleg Samatov, and famous goalkeeper Aleksandr Filimonov. The club's initial squad also had several famous players such as midfielder Yegor Titov and defender Dmytro Parfenov. Over the course of the 2011/12 season, Arsenal finished in 8th place in the Russian Amateur Football League, and all of the famous footballers left the club. Trainer Dmitri Alenichev decided to replace them with young players.

On June 18, 2012, Arsenal received a license to compete in Zone Center in the 2012–13 Russian Second Division. Arsenal won promotion at their first attempt, finishing the season with 73 points and 22 wins, 7 draws, and just 1 loss. In the 2013–14 season, FC Arsenal Tula were promoted once again, finishing as runners-up and being promoted to the Russian Premier League for the first time in their history. Over the course of the 2014–15 Russian Premier League, Arsenal finished in last place with 25 points and were relegated back to the FNL. During this season, on April 9, 2015, Arsenal had a sensational 1–0 victory over Spartak Moscow. In this match, the fans of Spartak climbed onto the roof of Arsenal Stadium despite it being unsafe, and one fan was hospitalized. This match resulted in the club being fined 500,000 rubles and being forced to play their next match against Krasnodar at a neutral venue. In the 2014–15 Russian Cup, Arsenal reached the quarterfinals, beating Zenit Saint Petersburg in their home stadium.

Before the beginning of the 2015–16 season, trainer Dmitri Alenichev left for Spartak Moscow and was replaced by Viktor Bulatov. Viktor Bulatov was sacked after 24 games, with the club having won 14, drawn 4, and lost 6 games under his tenure. Bulatov was replaced by Sergei Pavlov, who led Arsenal back to the Premier League, with the club finishing as runners-up with 82 points. In the 2016–17 Russian Premier League, Arsenal started poorly, and in October 2016, Pavlov was sacked and replaced with Sergei Kiriakov. Arsenal finished in 14th place and advanced to the relegation play-offs against Yenisey Krasnoyarsk, which Arsenal survived and stayed in the Premier League because of the away goals rule, as Arsenal had won 1–0 in Tula and lost 2–1 in Krasnoyarsk. In the 2017–18 season, Arsenal hired Miodrag Božović, who led them to their highest ever position of 7th in the Premier League. Božović left Arsenal after one year. Oleg Kononov took over as the manager but also left after 5 months at the helm. Igor Cherevchenko eventually led them to 6th place in the 2018–19 season, which qualified them for the very first time for the European competition, 2019–20 UEFA Europa League.

In the 2023–24 Russian First League season, Arsenal qualified for the Russian Premier League promotion play-offs. Arsenal lost to Pari Nizhny Novgorod 2–3 on aggregate and remained in the First League.

== League and Cup history ==
=== Soviet Union ===
Season	Div.	Pos.	Pl.	W	D	L	GS	GA	P	Cup
1946	3rd, "Center"	5	16	8	0	8	38	49	16	
1947–1948
1949	2nd, RSFSR-4	13	26	6	5	15	36	66	17	
1950–1958
1959	2nd, Zone 2	13	28	5	8	15	26	44	18	
1960	2nd, RSFSR-Zone 1	8	30	11	6	13	39	43	28	R64
1961	2nd, RSFSR-Zone 1	6	24	11	6	7	36	22	28	R128
1962	2nd, RSFSR-Zone 1	10	32	11	8	13	32	45	30	R256
1963	2nd, RSFSR-Zone 1	11	30	9	8	13	30	35	26	R512
1964	3rd, RSFSR-Zone 2	12	32	8	12	12	31	38	28	R64
1965	3rd, RSFSR-Zone 1	9	34	11	13	10	38	24	35	R1024
1966	3rd, RSFSR-Zone 1	2	32	15	13	4	33	15	43	R512
1966	3rd, Semi-final	1	4	2	1	1	3	2	5	R512
1966	3rd, Final	3	3	1	0	2	4	5	2	R512
1967	2nd (Group 2)	13	38	9	18	11	26	35	36	R512
1968	2nd (Group 2)	14	40	9	16	15	31	40	34	R256
1969	2nd (Group 2)	5	38	12	19	7	36	25	43	R128
1970	2nd (Group 2)	4	42	21	11	10	80	38	53	R16
1971	3rd, Zone 2	2	38	23	8	7	58	28	77	
1972	3rd, Zone 2	12	38	12	10	16	47	51	46	
1973	3rd, Zone 3	16	34	7	8	19	37	61	19	
1974	3rd, Zone 2	10	40	15	11	14	42	51	41	
1975	3rd, Zone 3	19	38	9	10	19	29	51	28	
1976	3rd, Zone 3	18	40	6	12	22	26	57	24	
1977	3rd, Zone 1	10	40	16	9	15	51	34	41	
1978	3rd, Zone 3	24	46	8	11	27	39	70	27	
1979	3rd, Zone 1	19	46	8	18	20	41	72	34	
1980	3rd, Zone 1	8	36	19	5	12	66	43	43	
1981	3rd, Zone 1	17	32	4	5	23	25	67	13	
1982	3rd, Zone 1	15	30	6	6	18	24	56	18	
1983	3rd, Zone 1	11	30	9	9	12	27	31	27	
1984	3rd, Zone 1	3	32	19	5	8	56	29	43	
1985	3rd, Zone 1	4	32	15	12	5	50	34	42	R32
1986	3rd, Zone 1	2	30	17	7	6	39	19	41	R64
1987	3rd, Zone 1	12	32	8	9	15	29	40	25	R64
1988	3rd, Zone 1	16	38	12	7	19	56	61	31	
1989	3rd, Zone 1	15	42	15	6	21	41	46	36	
1990	4th, Zone 5	15	32	8	8	16	31	48	24	
1991	4th, Zone 5	12	42	19	7	16	54	41	45	

=== Russia ===
Season	Div.	Pos.	Pl.	W	D	L	GS	GA	P	Cup
1992	3rd, Zone 2	7	42	22	7	13	56	45	51	R16
1993	3rd, Zone 3	2	34	21	7	6	58	15	49	R16
1994	3rd, Zone Center	9	32	14	7	11	47	33	35	R16
1995	3rd, Zone Center	6	40	19	10	11	61	43	67	R256
1996	3rd, Zone Center	4	42	29	5	8	79	36	92	R256
1997	3rd, Zone West	1	38	28	7	3	91	26	91	R16
1998	2nd	5	42	18	11	13	65	53	65	QF
1999	2nd	9	42	19	7	16	61	51	64	R32
2000	2nd	11	38	13	13	12	45	39	52	QF
2001	2nd	16	34	10	10	14	27	35	40	R32
2002	3rd, Zone West	2	38	23	8	7	66	29	77	R256
2003	3rd, Zone West	1	36	26	5	5	83	18	83	R32
2004	2nd	13	42	15	13	14	39	32	58	R32
2005	3rd, Zone West	13	32	8	8	16	26	31	32	R256
2006	3rd, Zone West	18	34	7	4	23	26	58	25	R512
2007	4th, Zone Central - Black Earth Region	2	32	18	9	5	71	21	63	
2008	4th, Zone Central - Black Earth Region	5	34	21	8	5	75	27	71	
2009	4th, Zone Central - Black Earth Region	7	24	12	3	9	40	24	39	
2010	4th, Zone Central - Black Earth Region	5	22	11	2	9	27	25	35	
2011–12	4th, Zone Central - Black Earth Region	8	42	18	10	14	58	43	64	
2012–13	3rd, Zone Center	1	30	22	7	1	74	20	73	R256
2013–14	2nd	2	36	21	6	9	62	39	69	R64
2014–15	1st	16	30	7	4	19	20	46	25	QF
2015–16	2nd	2	38	25	7	6	64	36	82	R64
2016–17	1st	14	30	7	7	16	18	40	28	R32
2017–18	1st	7	30	12	6	12	35	41	42	R32
2018–19	1st	6	30	12	10	8	40	33	46	SF
2019–20	1st	8	30	11	5	14	37	41	38	R16

=== European record ===
As of 1 August 2019

Season	Competition	Round	Club	Home	Away	Agg.
2019–20	UEFA Europa League	2QR	(Azerbaijan) Neftçi	0–1	0–3	0–4

Notes

- QR: Qualifying round

== Feeder club ==
Arsenal's feeder club Arsenal-2 Tula participated in the third tier of professional Russian football, Russian Professional Football League, beginning with the 2014–15 season. The club was dissolved after the 2016–17 season. Another team was called Arsenal-2 and competed professionally from 1998 to 2002, it last competed as Dynamo Tula.

== Supporters ==
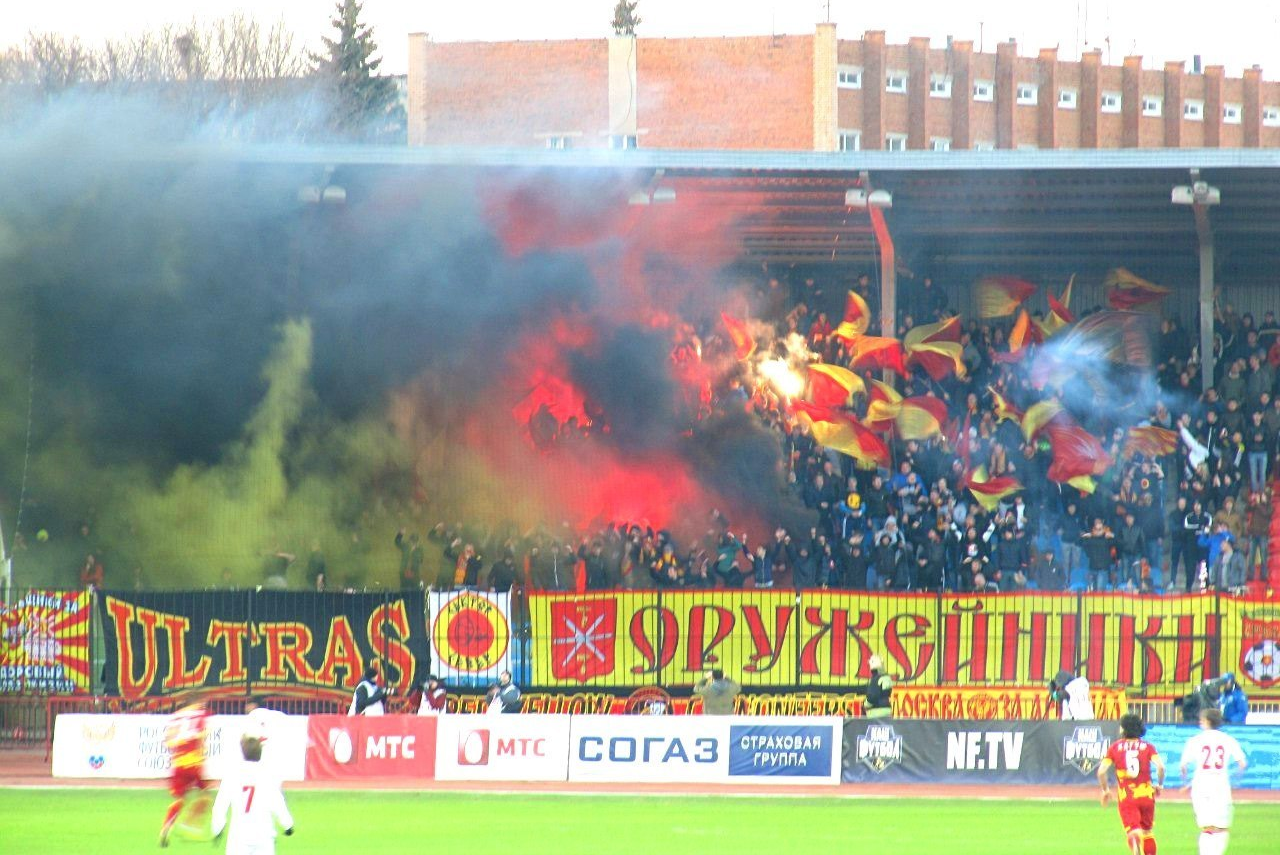
Arsenal Ultras

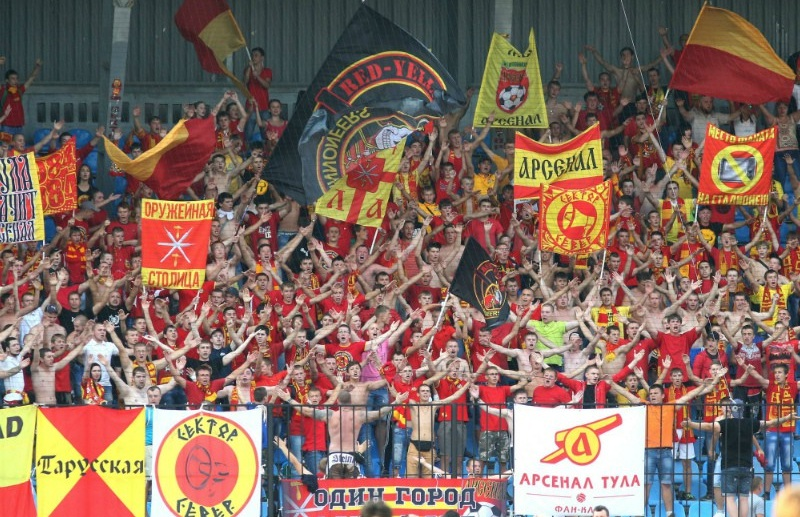
Arsenal Fans

Traditionally, the games of Arsenal have drawn great interest from the local football loving population. In the 2011–12 season, when Arsenal was still an amateur team, over 13,500 fans showed up for a match between Arsenal and Rusichi, which is an attendance record for a Russian amateur game. In the second division, FC Arsenal Tula's attendance was over 8,000 people on average. According to data collected by the Russian Football Union in 2013, Arsenal's attendance was 15th out of 106 professional clubs in Russia. In the FNL, the average attendance of Arsenal was 10,844, with over 16,500 people showing up for the key game against Torpedo Moscow. In Arsenal's first season in the Premier League, the average attendance was 12,154.

There are several ultras groups among Arsenal fans including the well-known Red-Yellow Cannoneers. The shirt number 12 has been permanently retired by the club management in honor of the fans.

== Current squad ==
As of 11 September 2026, according to the First League website. Note: Flags indicate national team as defined under FIFA eligibility rules; some limited exceptions apply. Players may hold more than one non-FIFA nationality.

No.	Pos.	Nation	Player
4	DF	RUS	Daniil Penchikov
5	DF	RUS	Yaroslav Krashevsky (on loan from Pari Nizhny Novgorod)
7	MF	DOM	Edarlyn Reyes
8	MF	RUS	Daniil Shamkin
9	MF	ARM	David Davidyan
10	MF	RUS	Ilya Zhigulyov
11	FW	RUS	Rashid Magomedov
14	MF	MNE	Miloš Brnović
17	MF	RUS	Igor Gorbunov
18	GK	RUS	Mikhail Tsulaya
19	MF	RUS	Nikita Glushkov
21	MF	RUS	Nikita Razdorskikh
22	MF	RUS	Giorgi Uridiya
23	FW	RUS	Timur Melekestsev

No.	Pos.	Nation	Player
24	DF	RUS	Kirill Gotsuk
25	MF	RUS	Artyom Biryukov (on loan from Rodina Moscow)
31	DF	RUS	Kirill Bolshakov
35	MF	RUS	Ivan Yenin
36	GK	RUS	Mikhail Levashov
39	GK	RUS	Matvey Kholin
42	GK	RUS	Aleksandr Melikhov
44	DF	RUS	Oleg Isayenko
45	DF	RUS	Nikita Karmayev
47	FW	RUS	Dmitry Gusarov
71	MF	RUS	Arseny Yefremov
75	FW	RUS	Timur Zhamaletdinov
77	DF	RUS	Daniil Plotnikov
82	DF	RUS	Aleksandr Alyokhin (on loan from Rodina Moscow)

=== Out on loan ===
Note: Flags indicate national team as defined under FIFA eligibility rules; some limited exceptions apply. Players may hold more than one non-FIFA nationality.

No.	Pos.	Nation	Player
—	DF	BLR	Ilya Moskalenchik (at Maxline Vitebsk until 31 December 2026)

== Coaching staff ==
- Head coach – Aleksandr Storozhuk
- Assistant coach – Georgy Sakhvadze
- Goalkeeping coach – Denis Pchelintsev
- Conditioning coach – Anton Antonov

== Honours ==
- Russian National Football League:
  - Runners-up (2): 2013–14, 2015–16
- Russian Professional Football League:
  - Winners Zone West (2): 1997, 2003
  - Winners Zone Center (1): 2012–13

== Notable players ==
Had international caps for their respective countries. Players whose name is listed in bold represented their countries while playing for Arsenal.

Russia/USSR

- (Russia) Zelimkhan Bakayev
- (Russia) **Maksim Belyayev**
- (Russia) Taras Burlak
- (Russia) **Artyom Dzyuba**
- (Russia) Vadim Evseev
- (Russia) Aleksandr Filimonov
- (Russia) Sergei Filippenkov
- (Russia) Vladimir Gabulov
- (Russia) Dmitri Khlestov
- (Russia) Daniil Khlusevich
- (Commonwealth of Independent States) Valeri Kleymyonov
- (Soviet Union) (Commonwealth of Independent States) (Russia) Dmitri Kuznetsov
- (Russia) Yuri Lodygin
- (Russia) Ilya Maksimov
- (Russia) **Ramiz Mamedov**
- (Tajikistan) (Russia) Mukhsin Mukhamadiev
- (Russia) Ivan Novoseltsev
- (Russia) Kirill Panchenko
- (Russia) Aleksandr Sheshukov
- (Soviet Union) Valeri Shmarov
- (Russia) Egor Titov

Europe

- (Armenia) Tigran Petrosyants
- (Azerbaijan) **Vladislav Kadyrov**
- (Belarus) **Dzmitry Balashow**
- (Belarus) **Valeriy Gromyko**
- (Belarus) Uladzimir Karytska
- (Belarus) Yury Kavalyow
- (Belarus) Andrei Kovalenko
- (Belarus) **Maksim Valadzko**
- (Bosnia and Herzegovina) Zoran Amidžić
- (Bulgaria) Mihail Aleksandrov
- (Bulgaria) Ivan Ivanov
- (Bulgaria) **Georgi Kostadinov**
- (Georgia (country)) **Gia Grigalava**
- (Georgia (country)) Edik Sajaia
- (Kazakhstan) Konstantin Ledovskikh
- (Kazakhstan) **Viktor Zubarev**
- (Latvia) **Aleksandrs Jeļisejevs**
- (Lithuania) Darius Gvildys
- (Moldova) **Valeriu Catînsus**
- (Montenegro) **Luka Đorđević**
- (Montenegro) **Mladen Kašćelan**
- (Montenegro) Goran Vujović
- (Romania) Alexandru Bourceanu
- (Romania) Florin Costea
- (Serbia) Ognjen Ožegović
- (Slovakia) **Ján Mucha**
- (Slovakia) **Lukáš Tesák**
- (Ukraine) Yuriy Hrytsyna
- (Ukraine) Dmytro Parfyonov
- (Ukraine) Oleksandr Pryzetko
- (Ukraine) Oleksandr Svystunov

Asia

- (Tajikistan) **Khakim Fuzailov**

North America

- (Costa Rica) Felicio Brown Forbes

Africa

- (Burkina Faso) **Bakary Koné**
- (Ghana) Emmanuel Frimpong
- (Ivory Coast) Habib Maïga
- (Mali) **Moussa Doumbia**
- (Zambia) **Kings Kangwa**
- (Zambia) **Evans Kangwa**
- (Zambia) **Stoppila Sunzu**

== Managers ==
- (Soviet Union) Viktor Papayev (1989)
- (Russia) Aleksei Petrushin (1993–94)
- (Russia) Anatoli Polosin (1995)
- (Russia) Gennadi Kostylev (1996)
- (Ukraine) Yevhen Kucherevskyi (1997–99)
- (Ukraine) Leonid Buryak (1999)
- (Russia) Vladimir Yurin (1999–00)
- (Russia) Vladimir Fedotov (2001)
- (Russia) Boris Stukalov (2004)
- (Russia) Yury Cheryevsky (2005–06)
- (Russia) Aleksandr Chimbiryov (2008–11)
- (Russia) Dmitri Alenichev (2011–15)
- (Russia) Viktor Bulatov (2015–16)
- (Russia) Sergei Pavlov (2016)
- (Russia) Andrei Kozlov (caretaker) (2016)
- (Russia) Sergei Kiriakov (2016–17)
- (Montenegro) Miodrag Božović (2017–2018)
- (Russia) Oleg Kononov (2018)
- (Tajikistan) Igor Cherevchenko (2018–2020)
- (Russia) Sergei Podpaly (2020)
- (Ukraine) Dmytro Parfenov (2020–2021)
- (Montenegro) Miodrag Božović (2021–2022)
- (Russia) Oleg Kononov (2022–2023)
- (Russia) Aleksandr Storozhuk (2023–)
