= Aleksandr Storozhuk =

Russian footballer

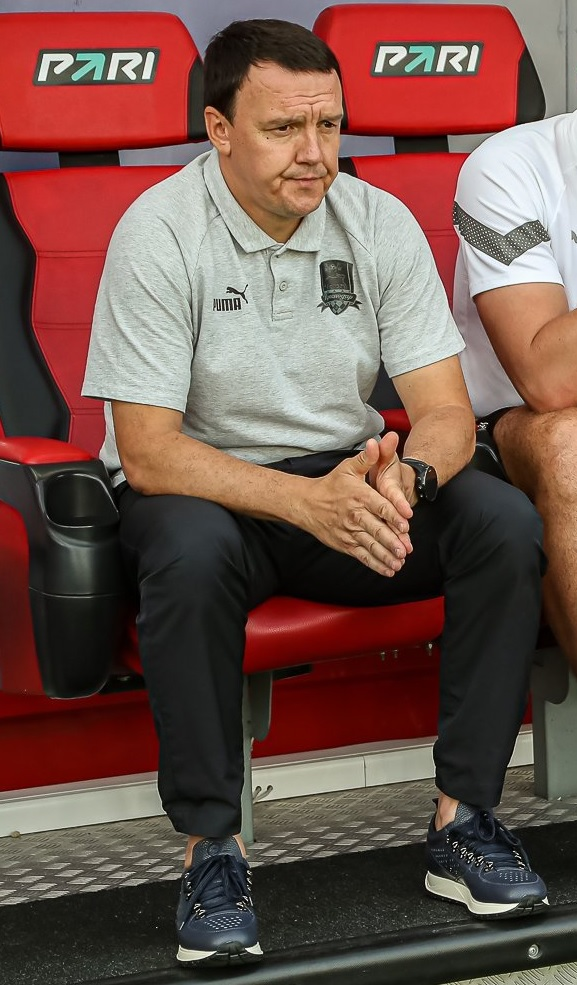
- Storozhuk coaching Krasnodar in 2022

Personal information
- Full name: Aleksandr Aleksandrovich Storozhuk
- Date of birth: 10 August 1981 (age 45)
- Place of birth: Vyselki, Krasnodar Krai, Russian SFSR
- Height: 1.76 m (5 ft 9 in)
- Position: Defender

Youth career
- DYuSSh Vyselki

Senior career*
Years	Team	Apps	(Gls)
1999	Zhemchuzhina-2 Sochi	24	(0)
2000	Nika Moscow (amateur)		
2001	Nika Moscow	34	(0)
2002–2005	Krasnodar-2000	97	(1)
2005	Lokomotiv-NN Nizhny Novgorod	22	(1)
2006–2007	Mashuk-KMV Pyatigorsk	74	(6)
2008	SKA Rostov-on-Don	26	(0)
2009	Chernomorets Novorossiysk	11	(0)
2009	Metallurg Lipetsk	7	(0)
2010	Irtysh Omsk	30	(4)
2011–2012	Gornyak Uchaly	24	(0)
2012	Slavyansky Slavyansk-na-Kubani	18	(2)
2014–2015	Afips Afipsky	11	(3)

Managerial career
- 2015: Afips Afipsky (assistant)
- 2015: Afips Afipsky
- 2015–2016: Afips Afipsky (assistant)
- 2016: Afips Afipsky
- 2016–2017: Afips-2 Afipsky
- 2017–2018: Afips Afipsky
- 2019–2021: Krasnodar (U19)
- 2021–2022: Krasnodar-2
- 2022–2023: Krasnodar
- 2023: Krasnodar-2
- 2023–2025: Arsenal Tula
- 2025: Akhmat Grozny
- 2026: Torpedo Moscow
- * Club domestic league appearances and goals

Aleksandr Aleksandrovich Storozhuk (Russian: Александр Александрович Сторожук; born 10 August 1981) is a Russian professional football coach and a former player.

== Playing career ==
He played 6 seasons in the Russian Football National League for 5 different clubs.

== Coaching career ==
On 16 June 2025, Storozhuk signed a three-year contract with Akhmat Grozny. He left Akhmat by mutual consent on 5 August 2025, after losing the first three games of the 2025–26 Russian Premier League season.
