= Zoran Amidžić =

Serbian footballer

Personal information
- Full name: Zoran Amidžić
- Date of birth: 31 March 1972 (age 54)
- Place of birth: SFR Yugoslavia
- Height: 1.84 m (6 ft 1/2 in)
- Position: Defender

Senior career*
Years	Team	Apps	(Gls)
- Rudar Ugljevik
1994–1997	Hajduk Kula	67	(1)
1999–2000	Proleter Zrenjanin	7	(0)
2001	Arsenal Tula	28	(1)
2002	Khimki	24	(1)
2003	Tobol Kostanay	13	(1)
2004	Arsenal Tula	10	(0)
- * Club domestic league appearances and goals as of 19 April 2016 ‡ National team caps and goals as of 19 April 2016

Zoran Amidžić (Serbian Cyrillic: Зоран Амиџић; born 31 March 1972) is a former Serbian football defender.

== Career ==
He played with FK Rudar Ugljevik in the Republika Srpska in Bosnia and Herzegovina before moving to Serbia where he played with FK Hajduk Kula and FK Proleter Zrenjanin in the First League of FR Yugoslavia.

He moved to Russia in 2001 and played with FC Arsenal Tula and FC Khimki in the Russian First Division until 2004, except the season 2003 that he played with FC Tobol in the Kazakhstan Premier League.

== Career statistics ==
Club	Season	League	
Club	Season	Apps	Goals
Hajduk Kula	1994–95	22	1
Hajduk Kula	1995–96	28	0
Hajduk Kula	1996–97	17	0
Total		67	1
