= Oleg Kononov =

Russian footballer (born 1966)

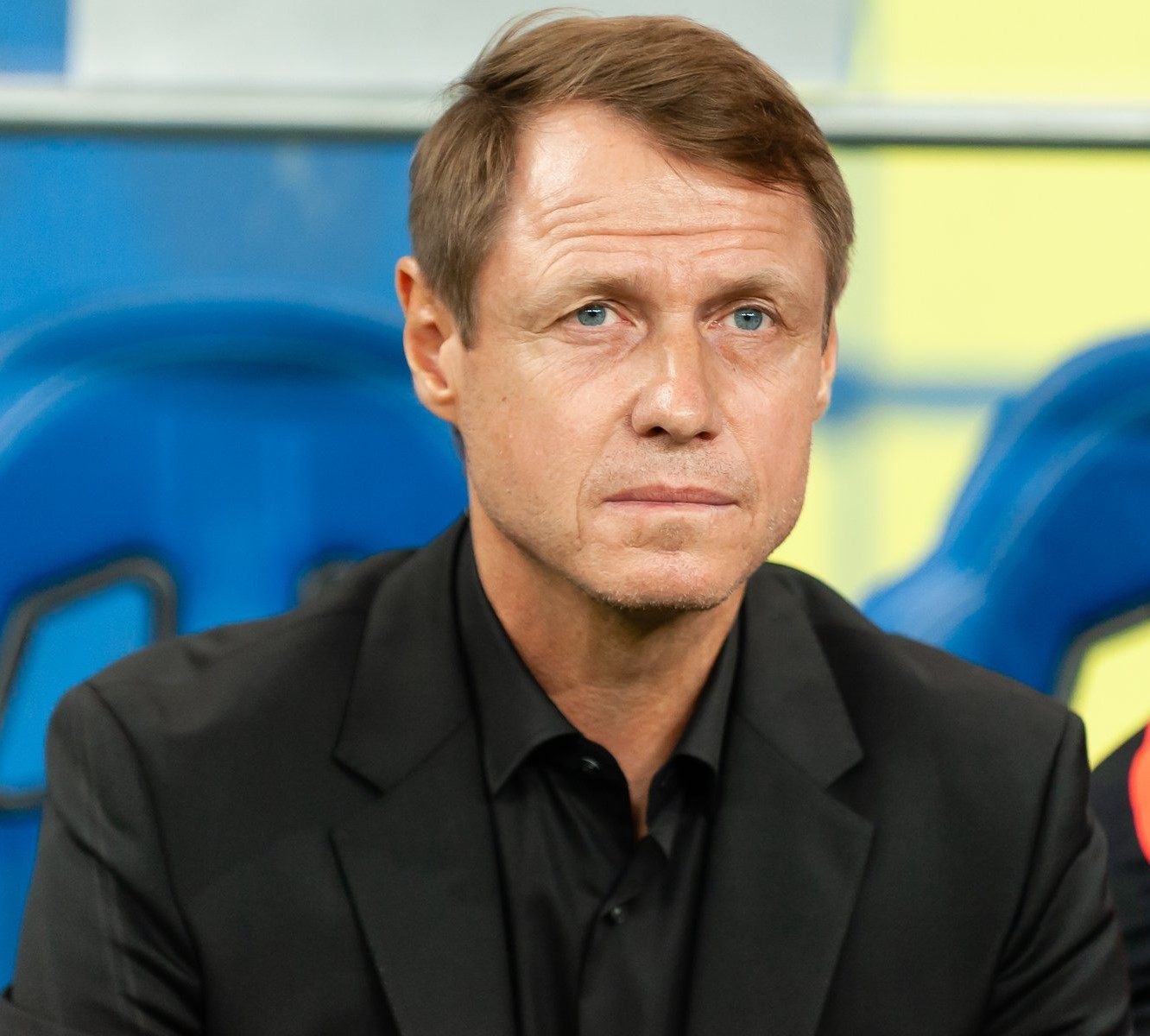
- Kononov with Spartak Moscow in 2019

Personal information
- Full name: Oleg Georgiyevich Kononov
- Date of birth: 23 March 1966 (age 60)
- Place of birth: Kursk, Russian SFSR
- Height: 1.83 m (6 ft 0 in)
- Position: Midfielder

Youth career
- –1983: DYuSSh-4 Kursk

Senior career*
Years	Team	Apps	(Gls)
1984	Iskra Smolensk	0	(0)
1986	Obuvshchik Lida		
1986–1988	Dnepr Mogilev	70	(8)
1989	Zarya Voroshilovgrad	8	(0)
1989–1992	KIM Vitebsk	101	(9)
1992–1993	Freiberg		
1993	Stroitel Vitebsk		
1994	Lokomotiv Vitebsk	14	(2)
1994	Dvina Vitebsk	11	(0)
1995	Ruch Chorzów	3	(0)
1996–1997	Naftan-Devon Novopolotsk	59	(3)
1998–1999	Torpedo-MAZ Minsk	31	(9)
Total		297	(31)

Managerial career
- 2000–2002: Torpedo-MAZ Minsk (assistant)
- 2003: Lokomotiv Minsk (assistant)
- 2004: Metalurh Zaporizhia (assistant)
- 2005–2008: Sheriff Tiraspol (assistant)
- 2005–2008: Sheriff Tiraspol (academy director)
- 2008–2011: Karpaty Lviv
- 2012–2013: Sevastopol
- 2013–2016: Krasnodar
- 2017: Akhmat Grozny
- 2018: Arsenal Tula
- 2018–2019: Spartak Moscow
- 2020: Riga FC
- 2022: Arsenal Tula
- 2023: Leon Saturn Ramenskoye
- 2024–2025: Torpedo Moscow
- 2025–2026: Torpedo Moscow
- * Club domestic league appearances and goals

Oleg Georgiyevich Kononov (Belarusian: Алег Георгіевіч Конанаў, Russian: Олег Георгиевич Кононов, born 23 March 1966) is a Belarusian–Russian professional football coach and former player.

== Playing career ==
Oleg Kononov began his playing career in RSFSR at Iskra Smolensk in 1983.

He later moved to Belarus, where he would play for various clubs until 1999.

In 1998, he was named the Belarusian Premier League Player of the year. Playing at KIM Vitebsk, he became the runner-up of the Belarusian Premier League.

== Managing career ==
=== Sheriff Tiraspol ===
The most glory Kononov attained as a coach, was while in charge of FC Sheriff Tiraspol. His team became the champions in Moldovan National Division three times (2004/05–2006/07), was the Moldavian Cup holder in 2006, and the Moldovan Super Cup in 2005.

=== Karpaty Lviv ===
On 9 June 2008, Kononov was invited to take charge of Ukrainian Premier League club Karpaty Lviv following the resignation of Valery Yaremchenko. He brought a new style of play to the team, including the use of a 4-3-3 formation which emphasizes the flanks instead of the usual 4-4-2 formation. At the end of the 2008-09 season, Karpaty finished in the season in middle of the league at 9th place. Kononov enjoyed more success the next season, guiding Karpaty to top 8 in the Ukrainian Cup where they were eliminated by eventual finalists Metalurh Donetsk. They also finished fifth in the league and therefore qualified for the 2010–11 UEFA Europa League, where after impressively passing Galatasaray in the playoff round, finished last in Group J with 1 point.

=== Krasnodar ===
He took over the management of FC Krasnodar early in the 2013–14 Russian Premier League and led them to Europe for the first time in their history, finishing 5th in the league and qualifying for the 2014–15 UEFA Europa League. In 2014–15 season they defeated, among others, Real Sociedad in the Europa League qualifiers and advanced to the group stage. They did not qualify for the knockout phase. Midway through the 2014–15 Russian Premier League competition, they reached the 2nd spot in the standings. He resigned from his Krasnodar position on 13 September 2016.

=== Arsenal Tula ===
He signed with FC Arsenal Tula on 1 June 2018.

=== Spartak Moscow ===
He left Arsenal by mutual consent on 12 November 2018 and signed with FC Spartak Moscow until the end of the 2018–19 season. on 29 September 2019, he resigned from Spartak following 4 consecutive losses in a league that were preceded by a failure to qualify for the 2019–20 UEFA Europa League group stage.

=== Riga FC ===
On 5 February 2020, he signed with the reigning Latvian champions Riga FC. The stint ended in late 2020.

=== Return to Arsenal Tula ===
On 10 June 2022, Kononov was hired once again by Arsenal Tula, freshly relegated to the second-tier Russian Football National League. On 11 January 2023, he left the post of head coach, having played 20 matches in the current season of the First League, in which FC Arsenal Tula won nine victories and drew five times.

=== Saturn Ramenskoye ===
In July 2023, Kononov headed the fourth-tier Russian Second League Division B club Leon Saturn Ramenskoye. He resigned from Leon Saturn on 31 August 2023.

=== Torpedo Moscow ===
On 24 May 2025, Torpedo Moscow, managed by Kononov, secured promotion to the Russian Premier League. Torpedo was removed from the RPL before the start of the season for attempted match-fixing in the 2024–25 season. He left Torpedo by mutual consent on 15 August 2025, after Torpedo started the First League season with 1 point in the first 4 games.

Kononov was re-hired by Torpedo two months later, as their fortunes did not significantly improve under his replacement Dmytro Parfyonov and the team was in the last place in the league. He left Torpedo by mutual consent on 20 May 2026, after the club finished 9th in the First League season.

== Honours ==
=== As a manager ===
Sevastopol

- Ukrainian First League: 2012-13

Krasnodar

- Russian Football Premier League third place: 2014-15
