= FC Krasnodar =

Russian professional football club

Krasnodar
- Full name: Футбольный клуб Краснодар (Futbolnyy Klub Krasnodar)
- Nicknames: Byki (The Bulls); Cherno-Zelenie (The Black-Greens)
- Founded: 22 February 2008; 18 years ago
- Ground: Krasnodar Stadium
- Capacity: 35,179
- Owner: Sergey Galitsky
- Chairman: Vladimir Khashig
- Manager: Murad Musayev
- League: Russian Premier League
- 2025–26: 2nd of 16
- Website: fckrasnodar.ru
Home colours	Away colours

FC Krasnodar is a Russian professional football club based in Krasnodar that plays in the Russian Premier League. They won the league in the 2024–25 season.

The club was founded in 2008. In 2009, the club was promoted to the Russian First Division, the second highest division of the Russian football league system, despite finishing Zone South of Second Division in third. At the end of the 2010 season, they were promoted to the Russian Premier League for the 2011 season, despite finishing fifth in the first division.

In 2013, FC Krasnodar began the construction of the 35,074-seat Krasnodar Stadium which was opened on 9 October 2016. Until the stadium was completed, FC Krasnodar continued playing their home matches in the Kuban Stadium.

After the 2022 Russian invasion of Ukraine, the European Club Association suspended the team, along with all other Russian clubs and national teams, from competing in European competitions.

== History ==
The club owner and founder is Sergey Galitsky, a Russian businessman who has been rewarded by the Russian Football Union for his dedication to development of football in Russia.

=== Early years ===
In February 2008, FC Krasnodar had been granted professional status which allowed them enter Second Division (the third tier of Russian professional football). Its first official match was a 0–0 draw against FC Nika Krasny Sulin. The team was at that time managed by Vladimir Volchek.

FC Krasnodar finished third in the 2008 Second Division season. Although the third place does not grant promotion to the upper tier of Russian football league, FC Krasnodar had been invited by PFL to take part in the 2009 First Division tournament. This happened because SKA Rostov and Sportakademklub refused to take part in the tournament despite finishing high enough to avoid relegation.

After being promoted, the club appointed Nurbiy Khakunov as manager. Krasnodar finished its debut First Division campaign tenth in the league table.

In the next season, FC Krasnodar was managed by Sergei Tashuyev. In this year, the team faced another club from Krasnodar city, FC Kuban. The first match between the rival clubs took place on 12 June 2010, where FC Kuban won 3–0. The second match also granted no points to FC Krasnodar as they lost the game 0–1. However the team's overall performance in this season had been more successful compared to previous year. They ended up 5th.

=== Promotion to the Premier League ===
In December 2010, FC Krasnodar signed a contract with Serbian manager Slavoljub Muslin. Before the start of the next season, FC Krasnodar got another promotion despite finishing fifth in the league. This happened because Saturn Ramenskoye, Nizhny Novgorod and KAMAZ declined to play in the Russian Premier League due to financial problems. On 25 January 2011, the Premier League committee decided to replace FC Saturn with FC Krasnodar.

After promotion to the Premier League, the team performed with mixed success. Both matches against perennial title contender CSKA Moscow ended in draws, which could be considered success considering the disparity between the two's squad strengths. However, in both matches against another top Premier League club in Spartak Moscow, the team conceded eight goals, losing away and home matches, 4–0 and 2–4, respectively. Other notable matches FC Krasnodar played were the ones against FC Kuban; matches between the two marked the first Premier League derby not involving Moscow-based clubs. In the first match, FC Krasnodar won 0–1, though FC Kuban won the second match, 0–2. During the season, club owner Sergey Galitsky stated that he was satisfied with his team's performance, also stating that he wants his team to play in a manner fascinating for spectators, and that he does not plan on buying expensive players; instead, the club should evolve steadily, "step by step." FC Krasnodar ultimately finished the 2011–12 season ninth in the league table.

The team's second season in 2012–13 was less successful. The team lost all but one match against the eventual top-three teams in the league. FC Krasnodar ended the year in tenth, one of the likelier reasons that led the board to terminate manager Slavoljub Muslin's contract. Muslin himself, however, stated that he was sacked because the club stopped investing into the club to improve its on-field performance.

On 11 August 2013, Belarusian coach Oleg Kononov was named manager of FC Krasnodar, with club management also bolstering the squad ahead of the 2013–14 season, with Ari, Artur Jędrzejczyk and Andreas Granqvist joining the club.

=== Contenders and the first title ===
These personnel changes awarded the club a top-five Premier League finish, making it eligible to compete in the UEFA Europa League for the first time in its history for 2014–15. FC Krasnodar also advanced to the Russian Cup Final where the club was narrowly defeated by Rostov in a penalty shoot-out. FC Krasnodar successfully completed three Europa League qualification phases after defeating Sillamäe Kalev, Diósgyőr and Real Sociedad on aggregate. The team then advanced to the Group Stage, where they were drawn into Group H alongside Lille, Wolfsburg and Everton, eventually finishing third.

The following year Krasnodar got to the Europa League group stage for the second time in a row. Their group consisted of Borussia Dortmund, PAOK and Gabala. They won all their home games and pulled off a 1–0 win against Dortmund. They finished first with 4 wins (1–0 against Dortmund, 2–1 against PAOK, 2–1 and 3–0 against Gabala), 1 draw (0–0 against PAOK and 1 loss (1–2 against Dortmund). They continued to the round of 32 and were drawn against Sparta Prague. They lost 1–0 in their away game and lost a poor home game, 3–0.

Their 2019–20 season was marred by injuries. Viktor Claesson and Rémy Cabella suffered ACL tears (Claesson missed whole season and Cabella played 12 games), Yury Gazinsky, Ari and Uroš Spajić all missed months of play. After eliminating Porto in the Champions League third qualifying round, they lost to Olympiacos 1–6 on aggregate in the play-off round. In the subsequent Europa League campaign, the club did not advance from group stage to the knock-out rounds. In the RPL, Krasnodar led the table early in the season, but finished the league in the 3rd spot, only qualifying for the Champions League qualifying rounds again; however, they managed to qualify to the 2020–21 UEFA Champions League group stage for the first time in their history. They also became the only Russian team to advance from the group stage of UEFA competitions that season, before being eliminated in the Europa League Round of 32 by Dinamo Zagreb. On the domestic front, the 2020–21 Russian Premier League season was not very successful, as the club spent most of the season mid-table, they finished in 10th place and failed to qualify for European competition after 7 consecutive seasons of doing so. Late in the season, Murad Musayev resigned as manager and was replaced by Viktor Goncharenko on a contract until the summer of 2023. 8 Months later, in January 2022, Viktor Goncharenko was sacked as head coach of the club. On 13 January 2022, Krasnodar announced Daniel Farke as Viktor Goncharenko's replacement as head coach. Farke and his coaching staff left the club on 2 March 2022, due to the Russian invasion of Ukraine. On 3 March 2022, 8 foreign players' contracts were suspended, but not terminated. The players would train on their own, but remained under contract. However, on 5 March 2022, Viktor Claesson was the first foreign player to be released from the club.

After the 2022 Russian invasion of Ukraine, the European Club Association suspended the team. German manager and former Norwich City head coach Daniel Farke left his position in light of the Russian invasion, and his three assistant coaches left with him.

In the 2023–24 season, Krasnodar led the league for long stretches. Manager Vladimir Ivić was fired and replaced by returning Murad Musayev after Krasnodar's Russian Cup elimination by a second-division club Khimki, even though Krasnodar was second in the table one point behind the leaders at the time. Some losses early under Musayev's management meant they entered the last game in 3rd place, 3 points behind league leaders Dynamo Moscow, whom Krasnodar hosted in the last game. Krasnodar beat Dynamo 1–0 and overtaken them in the standings, however, Zenit St. Petersburg won their game against Rostov 2–1 in a late comeback, taking their sixth consecutive title and leaving Krasnodar in second place.

Krasnodar started the 2024–25 season with a 2–4 loss to Zenit in the 2024 Russian Super Cup, followed by three draws against teams Krasnodar was heavily favoured against, taking 12th position in the table. However, Krasnodar followed it by a club-record 11 consecutive wins, taking the top spot in the standings by late October. The streak included victories over all other Top-6 teams (Zenit and 4 Moscow-based clubs) with an aggregate score of 11–1. On the last day of the season, 24 May 2025, Krasnodar beat Dynamo Moscow with the score of 3–0 and won the title for the first time in club's history.

In the 2025–26 season, Krasnodar led the standings for long stretches, before dropping to second place on the penultimate matchday after losing to Dynamo Moscow and finishing as runner-ups to Zenit.

Kevin Pina and Jhon Córdoba were selected to represent Cape Verde and Colombia respectively at the 2026 FIFA World Cup.

=== League position ===
Season	League									Russian Cup	Europe	Top goalscorer(s)		Manager(s)
Season	Div.	Pos.	Pl.	W	D	L	GF	GA	P	Russian Cup	Europe	Name(s)	League	Manager(s)
2008	3rd South	3rd	34	22	6	6	60	23	72	—	—	(Russia) Denis Dorozhkin	12	(Russia) Vladimir Volchek
2009	2nd	10th	38	14	10	14	50	47	52	3R	—	(Russia) Andrei Mikheyev	8	(Russia) Nurbiy Khakunov
2010	2nd	5th	38	17	10	11	60	44	61	R32	—	(Russia) Yevgeni Kaleshin	11	(Russia) Sergei Tashuyev
2011–12	1st	9th	44	16	13	15	58	61	61	R32 / R32	—	(Armenia) Yura Movsisyan	14	(Serbia) Slavoljub Muslin
2012–13	1st	10th	30	12	6	12	45	39	42	R16	—	(Brazil) Wánderson	13	(Serbia) Slavoljub Muslin
2013–14	1st	5th	30	15	5	10	46	39	50	Runners-up	—	(Brazil) Wánderson	9	(Serbia) Slavoljub Muslin (Belarus) Oleg Kononov
2014–15	1st	3rd	30	17	9	4	52	27	60	R16	EL GS	(Uruguay) Mauricio Pereyra	9	(Belarus) Oleg Kononov
2015–16	1st	4th	30	16	8	6	54	25	56	SF	EL R32	(Russia) Fyodor Smolov	20	(Belarus) Oleg Kononov
2016–17	1st	4th	30	12	13	5	40	22	49	QF	EL R16	(Russia) Fyodor Smolov	18	(Belarus) Oleg Kononov (Russia) Igor Shalimov
2017–18	1st	4th	30	16	6	8	46	30	54	R32	EL PO	(Russia) Fyodor Smolov	14	(Russia) Igor Shalimov (Russia) Murad Musayev (caretaker)
2018–19	1st	3rd	30	16	8	6	55	23	56	QF	EL R16	(Sweden) Viktor Claesson	12	(Russia) Sergey Matveyev (Russia) Murad Musayev (caretaker)
2019–20	1st	3rd	30	14	10	6	49	30	52	R32	CL PO; EL GS	(Sweden) Marcus Berg	9	(Russia) Murad Musayev
2020–21	1st	10th	30	12	5	13	52	45	41	R16	CL GS; EL R32	(Sweden) Marcus Berg	9	(Russia) Murad Musayev (Belarus) Viktor Goncharenko
2021–22	1st	4th	30	14	8	8	42	30	50	R32	—	(Armenia) Eduard Spertsyan	8	(Belarus) Viktor Goncharenko (Germany) Daniel Farke (Russia) Aleksey Antonyuk (caretaker) (Russia) Aleksandr Storozhuk
2022–23	1st	6th	30	13	9	8	62	46	48	Runners Up	Suspended	(Colombia) Jhon Córdoba	14	(Russia) Aleksandr Storozhuk (Serbia) Vladimir Ivić
2023–24	1st	2nd	30	16	8	6	45	29	56	Regions QF Stage 1	Suspended	(Colombia) Jhon Córdoba	15	(Serbia) Vladimir Ivić (Russia) Murad Musayev
2024–25	1st	1st	30	20	7	3	59	23	67	Regions QF Stage 2	Suspended	(Colombia) Jhon Córdoba	12	(Russia) Murad Musayev
2025–26	1st	2nd	30	20	6	4	60	23	66	Runners-up	Suspended	(Colombia) Jhon Córdoba	17	(Russia) Murad Musayev

== Honours ==
Domestic

- Russian Premier League
  - Winners (1): 2024–25
  - Runners-up (1): 2023–24
- Russian Cup
  - Runners-up (3): 2013–14, 2022–23, 2025–26

=== Non-official ===
- Match Premier Cup:
  - Winners (1): 2019

== European history ==
On 17 July 2014, FC Krasnodar played its first-ever match in the UEFA Europa League, playing Estonian club Sillamäe Kalev. FC Krasnodar took a conclusive 4–0 victory. The second match between these teams was also won by Krasnodar; the score was 5–0. In the next round, FC Krasnodar faced Diósgyőr, winning both matches by 5–1 and 3–0 scorelines, respectively.

In a draw for the playoff round, FC Krasnodar was unseeded, which brought them a much stronger opponent, Spanish club Real Sociedad. The first match against this club ended up in a 1–0 defeat, though FC Krasnodar won the second match 3–0, taking them to the competition's group stage.

The following year, Krasnodar got to the Europa League group stage for the second time in a row. Their group consisted of Borussia Dortmund, PAOK and Gabala. They won all their home games, and even pulled off a 1–0 win against Dortmund. They finished first with four wins (1–0 against Dortmund, 2–1 against PAOK, 2–1 and 3–0 against Gabala), one draw (0–0 against PAOK) and one loss (1–2 against Dortmund). They continued to the round of 32, and were drawn against Sparta Prague. They lost 1–0 in their away game, and lost their home game 3–0.

=== Overall ===
As of match played 25 February 2021

Competition	Pld	W	D	L	GF	GA	W%	Notes
UEFA Champions League	12	4	2	6	14	22	33.33	
UEFA Europa League	60	28	12	20	96	73	46.67	

=== Matches ===
Season	Competition	Round	Opponent	Home	Away	Aggregate
2014–15	UEFA Europa League	2Q	(Estonia) Sillamäe Kalev	5–0	4–0	9–0
2014–15	UEFA Europa League	3Q	(Hungary) Diósgyőr	3–0	5–1	8–1
2014–15	UEFA Europa League	PO	(Spain) Real Sociedad	3–0	0–1	3–1
2014–15	UEFA Europa League	Group H	(France) Lille	1–1	1–1	3rd out of 4
2014–15	UEFA Europa League	Group H	(Germany) VfL Wolfsburg	2–4	1–5	3rd out of 4
2014–15	UEFA Europa League	Group H	(England) Everton	1–1	1–0	3rd out of 4
2015–16	UEFA Europa League	3Q	(Slovakia) Slovan Bratislava	2–0	3–3	5–3
2015–16	UEFA Europa League	PO	(Finland) HJK Helsinki	5–1	0–0	5–1
2015–16	UEFA Europa League	Group C	(Germany) Borussia Dortmund	1–0	1–2	1st out of 4
2015–16	UEFA Europa League	Group C	(Greece) PAOK	2–1	0–0	1st out of 4
2015–16	UEFA Europa League	Group C	(Azerbaijan) Gabala	2–1	3–0	1st out of 4
2015–16	UEFA Europa League	R32	(Czech Republic) Sparta Prague	0–3	0–1	0–4
2016–17	UEFA Europa League	3Q	(Malta) Birkirkara	3–1	3–0	6–1
2016–17	UEFA Europa League	PO	(Albania) Partizani	4–0	0–0	4–0
2016–17	UEFA Europa League	Group I	(Germany) Schalke 04	0–1	0–2	2nd out of 4
2016–17	UEFA Europa League	Group I	(Austria) Red Bull Salzburg	1–1	1–0	2nd out of 4
2016–17	UEFA Europa League	Group I	(France) Nice	5–2	1–2	2nd out of 4
2016–17	UEFA Europa League	R32	(Turkey) Fenerbahçe	1–0	1–1	2–1
2016–17	UEFA Europa League	R16	(Spain) Celta Vigo	0–2	1–2	1–4
2017–18	UEFA Europa League	3Q	(Denmark) Lyngby BK	2–1	3–1	5–2
2017–18	UEFA Europa League	PO	(Serbia) Red Star Belgrade	3–2	1–2	4–4 (a)
2018–19	UEFA Europa League	Group J	(Turkey) Akhisarspor	2–1	1–0	2nd out of 4
2018–19	UEFA Europa League	Group J	(Belgium) Standard Liège	2–1	1–2	2nd out of 4
2018–19	UEFA Europa League	Group J	(Spain) Sevilla	2–1	0–3	2nd out of 4
2018–19	UEFA Europa League	R32	(Germany) Bayer Leverkusen	0–0	1–1	1–1 (a)
2018–19	UEFA Europa League	R16	(Spain) Valencia	1–1	1–2	2–3
2019–20	UEFA Champions League	3Q	(Portugal) Porto	0–1	3–2	3–3 (a)
2019–20	UEFA Champions League	PO	(Greece) Olympiacos	1–2	0–4	1–6
2019–20	UEFA Europa League	Group C	(Switzerland) Basel	1–0	0–5	3rd out of 4
2019–20	UEFA Europa League	Group C	(Spain) Getafe	1–2	0–3	3rd out of 4
2019–20	UEFA Europa League	Group C	(Turkey) Trabzonspor	3–1	2–0	3rd out of 4
2020–21	UEFA Champions League	PO	(Greece) PAOK	2–1	2–1	4–2
2020–21	UEFA Champions League	Group E	(Spain) Sevilla	1–2	2–3	3rd out of 4
2020–21	UEFA Champions League	Group E	(England) Chelsea	0–4	1–1	3rd out of 4
2020–21	UEFA Champions League	Group E	(France) Rennes	1–0	1–1	3rd out of 4
2020–21	UEFA Europa League	R32	(Croatia) Dinamo Zagreb	2–3	0–1	2–4

Notes

- 2Q: Second qualifying round
- 3Q: Third qualifying round
- PO: Play-off round
- R32: Round of 32
- R16: Round of 16

== Stadium ==
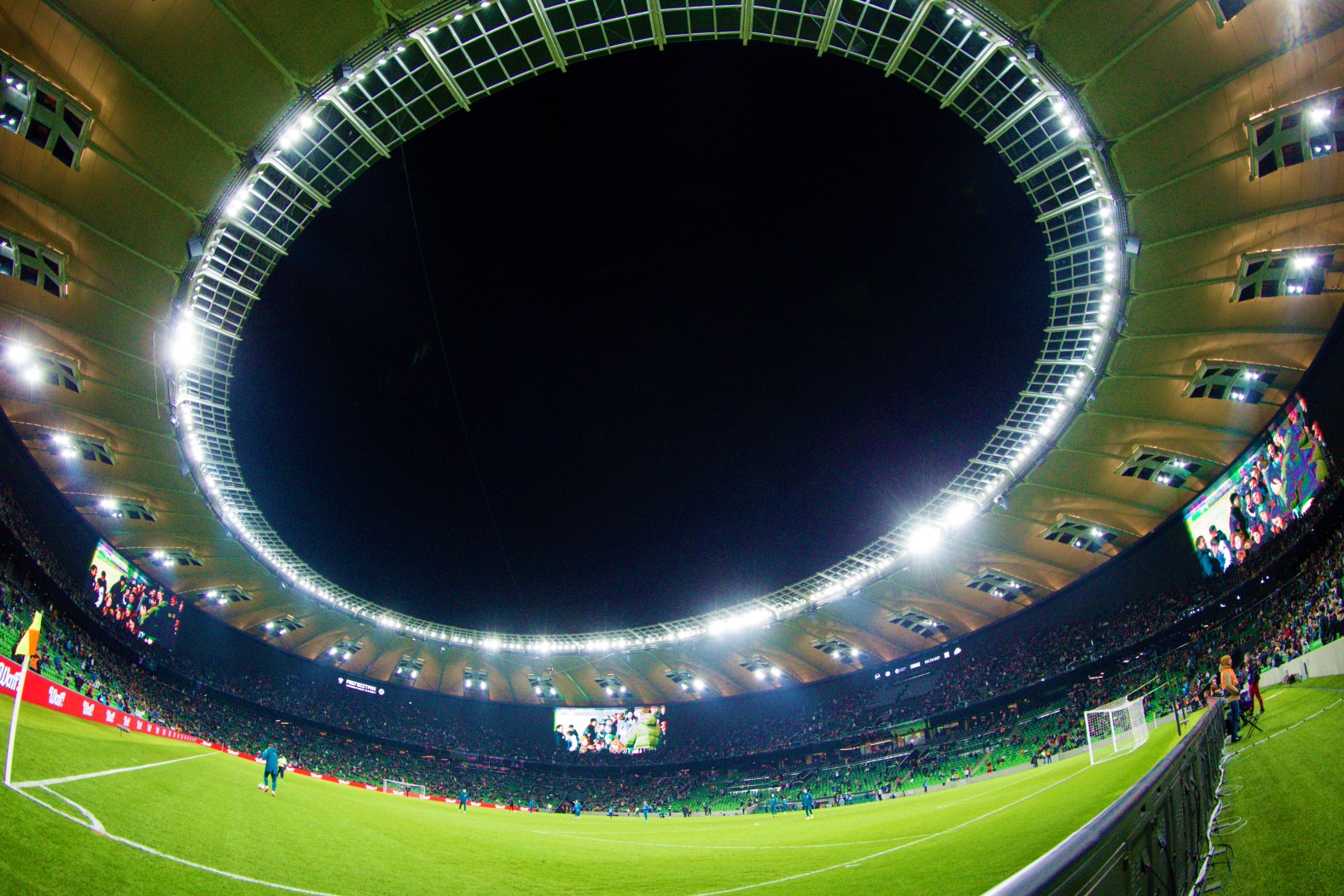
Krasnodar Stadium

The first stadium FC Krasnodar played its official matches at is Trud stadium. It is a 3,000-seat stadium situated in the southern part of Krasnodar city.

The stadium was used in 2008 when FC Krasnodar was playing in the Second Division. But after promotion to the First Division, the stadium's capacity ceased to be enough. Therefore, in 2009, FC Krasnodar had to move to Kuban Stadium (the stadium which is also used by FC Kuban).

In 2013, FC Krasnodar began to construct its own stadium with a capacity of 35,074 seats. The stadium project was created by English and German companies. The estimated cost of this stadium is €200 million. The stadium will meet the requirements for hosting international matches. Café, club shop, museum, nightclub, several banquet rooms, fitness room, business clubs, and children's room will be located inside the stadium.

== Ownerships, kit suppliers, and sponsors ==
Period	Kit manufacturers	Period	Sponsors	Owner
2008—2016	Kappa	2011—2013	Home Credit	Sergey Galitsky and Constell Group
2008—2016	Kappa	2013—2014	Westa	Sergey Galitsky and Constell Group
2008—2016	Kappa	2014—2022	Zott	Sergey Galitsky and Constell Group
2016—2022	Puma	2014—2022	Zott	Sergey Galitsky and Constell Group

== Players ==
=== Current squad ===
As of 5 September 2026

Note: Flags indicate national team as defined under FIFA eligibility rules; some limited exceptions apply. Players may hold more than one non-FIFA nationality.

No.	Pos.	Nation	Player
1	GK	RUS	Stanislav Agkatsev
2	DF	URU	Maizon Rodríguez
3	DF	BRA	Vítor Tormena
5	DF	BRA	Jubal
6	MF	CPV	Kevin Pina
8	MF	BRA	Douglas Augusto
9	FW	COL	Jhon Córdoba
10	FW	RUS	Dmitry Vorobyov
11	MF	ANG	João Batxi
15	DF	URU	Lucas Olaza
16	GK	RUS	Aleksandr Koryakin

No.	Pos.	Nation	Player
17	DF	RUS	Valentin Paltsev
18	MF	BRA	Christian
21	MF	RUS	Magomed Ozdoyev
23	FW	URU	Juan Manuel Boselli
34	GK	RUS	Andrey Karpenko
40	DF	RUS	Ilya Vakhaniya
47	MF	RUS	Daniil Utkin
53	MF	RUS	Aleksandr Chernikov
59	DF	RUS	Artyom Khmarin
88	MF	RUS	Nikita Krivtsov
98	DF	RUS	Sergei Petrov

=== Other players under contract ===
Note: Flags indicate national team as defined under FIFA eligibility rules; some limited exceptions apply. Players may hold more than one non-FIFA nationality.

No.	Pos.	Nation	Player
—	FW	RUS	Timur Abdrashitov

=== Out on loan ===
Note: Flags indicate national team as defined under FIFA eligibility rules; some limited exceptions apply. Players may hold more than one non-FIFA nationality.

No.	Pos.	Nation	Player
—	GK	RUS	Daniil Golikov (at Rostov until 30 June 2027)
—	DF	BRA	Diego Costa (at PAOK until 30 June 2027)
—	DF	RUS	Kirill Kistenyov (at Akhmat Grozny until 31 December 2026)
—	DF	RUS	Vitali Stezhko (at Ural Yekaterinburg until 30 June 2027)
—	MF	RUS	Mikhail Umnikov (at Rotor Volgograd until 30 June 2027)
—	MF	BRA	Gustavo Furtado (at Volos until 30 June 2027)

No.	Pos.	Nation	Player
—	FW	NGR	Moses Cobnan (at Levadiakos until 30 June 2027)
—	FW	RUS	Aleksandr Koksharov (at Fakel Voronezh until 30 June 2027)
—	FW	RUS	Yevgeny Kovalevsky (at Volgar Astrakhan until 30 June 2027)
—	FW	RUS	Kazbek Mukailov (at Krylia Sovetov Samara until 30 June 2027)
—	FW	RUS	Aleksandr Yegurnev (at Zenit-2 St. Petersburg until 31 December 2026)

== Coaching staff ==
Position	Name
Manager	(Russia) Murad Musayev
Assistant Manager	(Russia) Artur Olenin
Assistant Manager	(Russia) Vitaliy Korneev
Technical coach	(Russia) Artyom Popravkin
Goalkeeping coach	(Ukraine) Mikhail Savchenko
Conditioning coach	(Russia) Aleksey Malakhov

== WFC Krasnodar, FC Krasnodar-2 and FC Krasnodar-3 ==
A professional farm club called FC Krasnodar-2 was founded in 2013 and participated in the Russian Professional Football League (third tier). It was promoted to the second-tier Russian Football National League for the 2018–19 season, and formerly amateur FC Krasnodar-3 was licensed for the PFL.

== Youth academy ==
FC Krasnodar owns a network of youth football schools spread in four Russian regions – Krasnodar Krai, Adygea, Stavropol Krai and Kabardino-Balkaria. The main school is situated in the eastern part of Krasnodar. The Academy infrastructure includes 10 football fields, a 3000-seat stadium, a medical rehabilitation center, a swimming pool, a sauna, and a gym. There is also a dining room, an assembly hall, offices and hotel rooms for students' parents. The club owner Sergey Galitsky has stated that his goal is to compose the majority of the FC Krasnodar squad from locally trained players.

== Notable players ==
Had international caps for their respective countries. Players whose name is listed in bold represented their countries while playing for Krasnodar.

Russia

- (Russia) Denis Adamov
- (Russia) **Stanislav Agkatsev**
- (Russia) **Ilzat Akhmetov**
- (Russia) **Ari**
- (Russia) **Sergei Borodin**
- (Russia) Aleksei Bugayev
- (Russia) Vladimir Bystrov
- (Russia) **Aleksandr Chernikov**
- (Russia) Maksim Demenko
- (Russia) Daniil Fomin
- (Russia) **Yury Gazinsky**
- (Russia) Vladislav Ignatyev
- (Russia) **Aleksei Ionov**
- (Russia) Marat Izmailov
- (Russia) Ruslan Kambolov
- (Russia) Lyubomir Kantonistov
- (Russia) Nikolay Komlichenko
- (Russia) **Stanislav Kritsyuk**
- (Russia) **Nikita Krivtsov**
- (Russia) Fyodor Kudryashov
- (Russia) Yevgeni Latyshonok
- (Russia) **Pavel Mamayev**
- (Russia) Magomed Ozdoyev
- (Russia) **Valentin Paltsev**
- (Russia) **Sergei Petrov**
- (Russia) **Matvei Safonov**
- (Russia) Oleg Shatov
- (Russia) **Roman Shirokov**
- (Russia) **Roman Shishkin**
- (Russia) **Igor Smolnikov**
- (Russia) **Fyodor Smolov**
- (Russia) Yegor Sorokin
- (Russia) **Dmitry Stotsky**
- (Russia) **Dmitri Torbinski**
- (Russia) Daniil Utkin
- (Russia) **Ilya Vakhaniya**
- (Russia) **Sergei Volkov**
- (Russia) **Dmitry Vorobyov**
- (Russia) Roman Vorobyov
- (Russia) Renat Yanbayev
- (Russia) Aleksandr Yerokhin

Europe

- (Armenia) **Georgy Arutyunyan**
- (Armenia) Arsen Beglaryan
- (Armenia) **Yura Movsisyan**
- (Armenia) **Marcos Pizzelli**
- (Armenia) **Eduard Spertsyan**
- (Belarus) **Syarhey Kislyak**
- (Belarus) **Alyaksandr Kulchy**
- (Belarus) **Alyaksandr Martynovich**
- (Bosnia and Herzegovina) Ricardo Baiano
- (Bosnia and Herzegovina) **Ognjen Vranješ**
- (France) Rémy Cabella
- (Georgia (country)) **Aleksandre Amisulashvili**
- (Georgia (country)) **Otar Martsvaladze**
- (Georgia (country)) **Tornike Okriashvili**
- (Georgia (country)) **Nukri Revishvili**
- (Hungary) **Vladimir Koman**
- (Iceland) **Jón Guðni Fjóluson**
- (Iceland) **Ragnar Sigurðsson**
- (Kazakhstan) Almir Mukhutdinov
- (Moldova) Valeriu Ciupercă
- (Moldova) **Igor Picușceac**
- (Montenegro) **Nikola Drinčić**
- (Netherlands) Tonny Vilhena
- (Norway) Erik Botheim
- (Norway) **Stefan Strandberg**
- (Poland) **Artur Jędrzejczyk**
- (Poland) **Grzegorz Krychowiak**
- (Portugal) Manuel Fernandes
- (Romania) **Andrei Ivan**
- (Serbia) Dušan Anđelković
- (Serbia) Mihailo Ristić
- (Serbia) **Uroš Spajić**
- (Sweden) **Marcus Berg**
- (Sweden) **Viktor Claesson**
- (Sweden) **Andreas Granqvist**
- (Sweden) **Kristoffer Olsson**
- (Ukraine) Denys Dedechko
- (Ukraine) Andriy Dykan

Africa

- (Angola) **João Batxi**
- (Burkina Faso) **Charles Kaboré**
- (Cameroon) Ambroise Oyongo
- (Cameroon) Adolphe Teikeu
- (Cape Verde) **Kevin Pina**
- (Nigeria) **Olakunle Olusegun**
- (Senegal) **Moussa Konaté**

South America

- (Colombia) **Kevin Castaño**
- (Colombia) **Jhon Córdoba**
- (Ecuador) **Cristian Ramírez**
- (Paraguay) **Júnior Alonso**
- (Peru) **Christian Cueva**
- (Uruguay) Giovanni González
- (Uruguay) **Lucas Olaza**

Asia

- (Tajikistan) **Alidzhoni Ayni**
- (Uzbekistan) **Odil Ahmedov**

== Managers ==
As of match played 21 May 2022

Name	Nat.	From	To	P	W	D	L	GS	GA	%W	Honours	Notes
Vladimir Volchek	Russia	1 January 2008	18 August 2008									
Nurbiy Khakunov	Russia	2009	31 December 2009									
Sergei Tashuyev	Russia	1 January 2010	10 December 2010	42	20	10	12	65	47	47.62		
Slavoljub Muslin	Serbia	1 January 2011	9 August 2013	83	31	20	32	114	109	37.35		
Oleg Kononov	Belarus	11 August 2013	13 September 2016	130	71	31	28	234	125	54.62		
Igor Shalimov (caretaker)	Russia	13 September 2016	6 October 2016	6	5	1	0	10	4	83.33		
Igor Shalimov	Russia	6 October 2016	1 April 2018	10	4	4	2	13	10	40.00		
Murad Musayev	Russia	3 April 2018	3 April 2021	126	57	29	40	199	148	45.24		
Viktor Goncharenko	Belarus	3 April 2021	5 January 2022	26	11	6	9	39	31	42.31		
Daniel Farke	Germany	13 January 2022	2 March 2022	0	0	0	0	0	0	—		
Aleksey Antonyuk (caretaker)	Russia	2 March 2022	5 April 2022	4	2	1	1	5	4	50.00		
Aleksandr Storozhuk	Russia	5 April 2022	Present	8	4	2	2	8	8	50.00		

- Notes:

P – Total of played matches W – Won matches D – Drawn matches L – Lost matches GS – Goal scored GA – Goals against
%W – Percentage of matches won

Nationality is indicated by the corresponding FIFA country code(s).
