= 2015–16 FC Ural Sverdlovsk Oblast season =

Ural
2015–16 season
- Chairman: Grigori Ivanov
- Manager: Viktor Goncharenko (until 1 September 2015); Vadim Skripchenko (until 3 September 2015)
- Stadium: SKB-Bank Arena
- Russian Premier League: 8th
- Russian Cup: Round of 16 vs CSKA Moscow
- Top goalscorer: League: Spartak Gogniyev (8); All: Spartak Gogniyev (9)
Home colours	Away colours

The 2015–16 Ural season was the club's 3rd successive season that the club played in the Russian Premier League, the highest tier of association football in Russia, during which they finished the season in 8th. Ural also participated in the Russian Cup, where they were knocked out at the Round of 16 stage by CSKA Moscow.

== Squad ==
As of 8 April 2016

Note: Flags indicate national team as defined under FIFA eligibility rules; some limited exceptions apply. Players may hold more than one non-FIFA nationality.

No.	Pos.	Nation	Player
2	DF	RUS	Vladimir Khozin
3	FW	ZAM	Chisamba Lungu
4	DF	BLR	Alyaksandr Martynovich (on loan from Krasnodar)
7	DF	RUS	Aleksandr Dantsev
8	MF	UKR	Kostyantyn Yaroshenko
9	FW	RUS	Spartak Gogniyev
10	FW	ARM	Edgar Manucharyan
11	MF	RUS	Aleksandr Stavpets
12	DF	RUS	Aleksandr Novikov
15	MF	UKR	Denys Kulakov
18	FW	RUS	Nikita Burmistrov (on loan from Krasnodar)
21	MF	CHI	Gerson Acevedo
28	GK	RUS	Nikolai Zabolotny
29	DF	ARG	Pablo Fontanello
30	GK	BLR	Yuri Zhevnov

No.	Pos.	Nation	Player
33	DF	RUS	Mikhail Merkulov
34	FW	RUS	Denis Dorozhkin
35	GK	RUS	Dmitri Arapov
41	MF	RUS	Aleksandr Sapeta
54	MF	RUS	Aleksandr Ryazantsev
57	MF	RUS	Artyom Fidler
62	MF	RUS	Rezo Gavtadze
71	FW	AZE	Elbeyi Guliyev
75	MF	RUS	Sergei Serchenkov
77	MF	UKR	Dmytro Bilonoh
88	MF	RUS	Dmitri Korobov
90	MF	RUS	Aleksandr Scherbakov
92	MF	RUS	Roman Yemelyanov
97	MF	RUS	Eduard Valiakhmetov
—	DF	SRB	Dominik Dinga

=== Out on loan ===
Note: Flags indicate national team as defined under FIFA eligibility rules; some limited exceptions apply. Players may hold more than one non-FIFA nationality.

No. / Pos. / Nation / Player; — / DF / RUS / Denis Fomin (on loan at Tekstilshchik)	No. / Pos. / Nation / Player; — / FW / RUS / Georgi Nurov (on loan at Tom)

=== Youth team ===
As per Russian Football Premier League. Note: Flags indicate national team as defined under FIFA eligibility rules; some limited exceptions apply. Players may hold more than one non-FIFA nationality.

No.	Pos.	Nation	Player
16	GK	RUS	Aleksandr Shubin
17	DF	RUS	Artemi Dorozhinsky
19	FW	RUS	Valeriy Kuznetsov
20	DF	RUS	Roman Mironov
22	DF	RUS	Kirill Kochnev
31	MF	RUS	Vladislav Blinov
37	MF	RUS	Evgeniy Shumikhin
38	FW	RUS	Aleksei Gontsa
40	DF	RUS	Maksim Gorin
45	MF	RUS	Ilya Korelin
47	DF	RUS	Artyom Vakurin
48	DF	RUS	Denis Drozhalkin
51	GK	RUS	Yevgeni Zharikov
52	DF	RUS	Roman Shalin
55	DF	RUS	Pavel Vlasenko
58	FW	RUS	Bogdan Mishukov

No.	Pos.	Nation	Player
59	MF	RUS	Sergey Podoksyonov
61	DF	RUS	Pavel Parshin
64	MF	RUS	Vladislav Zolotukhin
69	MF	RUS	Andrey Sheptiy
70	MF	RUS	Dmitri Davletshin
73	FW	RUS	Konstantin Reshetnikov
74	DF	RUS	Danil Chernov
76	MF	RUS	Mikhail Filippov
79	FW	RUS	Artyom Yusupov
80	DF	RUS	Yegor Zlygostev
84	DF	RUS	Evgeniy Ivanov
87	MF	RUS	Rustam Nisafutdinov
91	FW	RUS	Nikita Durandin
95	FW	RUS	Aleksandr Babushkin
96	GK	RUS	Andrei Timofeyev
99	GK	RUS	Aleksei Mamin

== Transfers ==
=== Summer ===
In: Note: Flags indicate national team as defined under FIFA eligibility rules; some limited exceptions apply. Players may hold more than one non-FIFA nationality.

No.	Pos.	Nation	Player
4	DF	BLR	Alyaksandr Martynovich (on loan from (Russia) Krasnodar)
5	DF	RUS	Ivan Knyazev (from (Russia) Torpedo Moscow)
15	MF	UKR	Denys Kulakov (from (Ukraine) Metalist Kharkiv)
18	FW	RUS	Nikita Burmistrov (on loan from (Russia) Krasnodar)
19	FW	RUS	Valeri Kuznetsov (from (Russia) Amkar Perm)
20	DF	RUS	Roman Mironov
25	MF	RUS	Igor Lambarschi (end of loan to (Russia) Tyumen)
27	DF	RUS	Mikhail Merkulov (from (Russia) MITOS Novocherkassk)
30	GK	BLR	Yuri Zhevnov (from (Russia) Torpedo Moscow)
32	MF	RUS	Andrei Gorbanets (end of loan to (Russia) Tom Tomsk)
53	MF	RUS	Sergei Podoksyonov
77	MF	UKR	Dmytro Bilonoh (from (Ukraine) Shakhtar-3 Donetsk)
58	FW	RUS	Bogdan Mishukov
98	FW	SWE	Carlos Strandberg (on loan from (Russia) CSKA Moscow)
99	GK	RUS	Aleksei Mamin

Out: Note: Flags indicate national team as defined under FIFA eligibility rules; some limited exceptions apply. Players may hold more than one non-FIFA nationality.

No.	Pos.	Nation	Player
8	MF	RUS	Ivan Chudin (to (Russia) Tyumen)
27	DF	RUS	Mikhail Merkulov (on loan to (Russia) Baikal Irkutsk)
28	GK	RUS	Nikolai Zabolotny
30	MF	RUS	Nikita Tikhonov
33	GK	RUS	Igor Kot (to (Russia) Arsenal Tula)
38	MF	RUS	Nikita Mamonov
39	DF	RUS	Ignat Sabirzyanov (to (Russia) Nosta Novotroitsk)
43	MF	RUS	Pavel Repin
44	GK	RUS	Ivan Klyuyev
45	FW	RUS	Aleksandr Sobolev
50	DF	RUS	Nikolay Markov (end of loan from (Russia) FC Krasnodar)
55	MF	RUS	Anatoli Sedov
63	DF	RUS	Aleksandr Belozyorov
69	DF	RUS	Aleksei Nelyubin
71	FW	AZE	Elbeyi Guliyev (on loan to (Kazakhstan) Zhetysu)
81	FW	RUS	Semyon Voronov
82	MF	RUS	Vladimir Lisov
88	DF	RUS	Aleksei Gerasimov (on loan to (Kazakhstan) Zhetysu)
93	MF	RUS	Semyon Pomogayev
94	MF	RUS	Aleksandr Kashkarov
90	FW	RUS	Fyodor Smolov (end of loan from (Russia) Dynamo Moscow)
—	DF	RUS	Adessoye Oyewole (to (Russia) Gazovik Orenburg, previously on loan)
—	DF	RUS	Denis Tumasyan (to (Russia) Ufa, previously on loan)
—	MF	RUS	Andrei Bochkov (contract expired, previously on loan at (Russia) Tosno)
—	MF	RUS	Ivan Melnik (released, previously on loan to (Russia) Khimik Dzerzhinsk)
—	FW	RUS	Arsen Goshokov (to (Russia) KAMAZ Naberezhnye Chelny, previously on loan to (Russia) Spartak Nalchik)
—	FW	RUS	Georgi Nurov (on loan to (Russia) Tom Tomsk, previously on loan at (Russia) Baltika Kaliningrad)

=== Winter ===
In: Note: Flags indicate national team as defined under FIFA eligibility rules; some limited exceptions apply. Players may hold more than one non-FIFA nationality.

No.	Pos.	Nation	Player
22	DF	RUS	Kirill Kochnev
28	GK	RUS	Nikolai Zabolotny (not registered with the league previously)
31	MF	RUS	Vladislav Blinov
33	DF	RUS	Mikhail Merkulov (end of loan to (Russia) Baikal Irkutsk)
40	DF	RUS	Maksim Gorin
38	FW	RUS	Aleksei Gontsa
54	MF	RUS	Aleksandr Ryazantsev (on loan from (Russia) Zenit St. Petersburg)
55	DF	RUS	Pavel Vlasenko
71	FW	AZE	Elbeyi Guliyev (end of loan to (Kazakhstan) Zhetysu)
73	FW	RUS	Konstantin Reshetnikov
88	MF	RUS	Dmitri Korobov (from (Russia) Fakel Voronezh)
—	DF	SRB	Dominik Dinga (from (Serbia) Vojvodina)

Out: Note: Flags indicate national team as defined under FIFA eligibility rules; some limited exceptions apply. Players may hold more than one non-FIFA nationality.

No.	Pos.	Nation	Player
5	DF	RUS	Ivan Knyazev (to (Latvia) Riga)
14	MF	RUS	Vyacheslav Podberyozkin (to (Russia) Krasnodar)
24	DF	RUS	Denis Fomin (on loan to (Russia) Tekstilshchik Ivanovo)
25	MF	RUS	Igor Lambarschi (to (Russia) Volga-Olimpiyets Nizhny Novgorod)
32	MF	RUS	Andrei Gorbanets (to (Russia) Arsenal Tula)
89	MF	RUS	Aleksandr Yerokhin (to (Russia) Rostov)
98	FW	SWE	Carlos Strandberg (end of loan from (Russia) CSKA Moscow)
—	DF	RUS	Aleksei Gerasimov (to (Russia) Volga-Olimpiyets Nizhny Novgorod, previously on loan to (Kazakhstan) Zhetysu)

== Competitions ==
=== Russian Premier League ===
==== Results by round ====
Round	1	2	3	4	5	6	7	8	9	10	11	12	13	14	15	16	17	18	19	20	21	22	23	24	25	26	27	28	29	30
Ground																														
Result																														
Position																														

Updated to match(es) played on 2 June 2016. Source: Russian Premier League
A = Away; H = Home; W = Win; D = Draw; L = Loss

==== Matches ====
20 July 2015 1	Kuban Krasnodar	0 – 2	Ural	Krasnodar
22:00 YET (UTC+5)	Arshavin (yellow card) 57'; Ignatyev (yellow card) 61'	Summary	Dorozhkin (yellow card) 45'; Manucharyan 73'; Acevedo 90+3' (pen.)	Stadium: Kuban Stadium; Attendance: 11,817; Referee: Kirill Levnikov

26 July 2015 2	Ural	1 – 4	Zenit St. Petersburg	Yekaterinburg
19:30 YET (UTC+5)	Erokhin (yellow card) 33', (goal) 67'; Fontanello (yellow card) 50'; Yemelyanov (yellow card) 90'	Summary	Dzyuba 20'; Yusupov (yellow card) 40'; Hulk 50' (pen.), 70'; Danny 90+1'	Stadium: SKB-Bank Arena; Attendance: 9,900; Referee: Aleksey Yeskov

2 August 2015 3	Mordovia Saransk	1 – 1	Ural	Saransk
19:00 YET (UTC+5)	Lutsenko 90+1' (yellow card) 90+2'	Summary	Manucharyan 41'	Stadium: Start Stadium; Attendance: 5,578; Referee: Mikhail Vilkov

8 August 2015 4	Ural	1 – 3	Lokomotiv Moscow	Yekaterinburg
19:00 YET (UTC+5)	Yerokhin 73' (yellow card) 90'	Summary	Samedov 28'; Niasse 40'; Maicon (yellow card) 83' (goal) 90+1'	Stadium: SKB-Bank Arena; Attendance: 9,100; Referee: Sergey Kulikov

16 August 2015 5	Dynamo Moscow	1 – 0	Ural	Khimki
19:30 YET (UTC+5)	Morozov 60'; Gabulov (yellow card) 86'	Summary	Yemelyanov (yellow card) 24'; Erokhin (yellow card) 45+2'	Stadium: Arena Khimki; Attendance: 5,241; Referee: Sergey Ivanov

22 August 2015 6	Anzhi Makhachkala	1 – 1	Ural	Kaspiysk
22:30 YET (UTC+5)	Leonardo 68' (pen.)	Summary	Podberyozkin (yellow card) 9'; Yerokhin 45'; Yemelyanov (yellow card) 63'; Sapeta (red card) 67'	Stadium: Anzhi Arena; Attendance: 12,000; Referee: Aleksei Matyunin

28 August 2015 7	Ural	3 – 3	Terek Grozny	Yekaterinburg
19:00 YET (UTC+5)	Manucharyan 8'; Fontanello 16'; Yerokhin 88'	Summary	Rybus 22'; Sadayev 39'; Aissati 66'; Utsiyev (yellow card) 71'; Mbengue (yellow card) 74'	Stadium: SKB-Bank Arena; Attendance: 4,700; Referee: Vitaly Meshkov

14 September 2015 8	Ufa	0 – 1	Ural	Ufa
18:00 YEKT (UTC+5)	Zaseyev (yellow card) 70'	Summary	Acevedo 11'; Sapeta (yellow card) 42'	Stadium: Neftyanik Stadium; Attendance: 4,674; Referee: Sergey Kostevich

21 September 2015 9	Ural	3 – 1	Krasnodar	Yekaterinburg
18:30 YET (UTC+5)	Podberyozkin 36'; Acevedo 69'; Fontanello 74'	Summary	Ahmedov 22'; Kaboré (yellow card) 45'; Gazinsky (yellow card) 73'	Stadium: SKB-Bank Arena; Attendance: 4,623; Referee: Igor Fedotov

27 September 2015 10	Rubin Kazan	1 – 2	Ural	Kazan
22:00 YET (UTC+5)	Nabiullin 24'; Kanunnikov (yellow card) 77'; Kverkvelia 79' (o.g.)	Report	Podberyozkin 3'; Kulakov (yellow card) 33'; Sapeta (yellow card) 45'; Martynovich (yellow card) 52'; Stavpets (yellow card) 83'; Yerokhin (yellow card) 85'	Stadium: Central Stadium; Attendance: 16,807; Referee: Aleksandr Egorov

2 October 2015 11	Ural	1 – 1	Krylia Sovetov	Yekaterinburg
19:00 YET (UTC+5)	Lungu 26'; Kulakov (yellow card) 68'	Summary	Tsallagov 44' (yellow card) 69'; Pomerko (yellow card) 90+2'	Stadium: SKB-Bank Arena; Attendance: 6,500; Referee: Kirill Levnikov

17 October 2015 12	CSKA Moscow	3 – 2	Ural	Khimki
16:00 YET (UTC+5)	Panchenko 2'; Doumbia 38'; Tošić (yellow card) 40'; Wernbloom 56'	Summary	Acevedo 22'; Erokhin (yellow card) 28'; Dantsev (yellow card) 31'; Gogniyev 60'; Kulakov (yellow card) 86'	Stadium: Arena Khimki; Attendance: 10,000; Referee: Sergei Ivanov

24 October 2015 13	Ural	3 – 1	Amkar Perm	Yekaterinburg
14:00 YET (UTC+5)	Fontanello 6'; Sapeta 65'; Dantsev (yellow card) 79'; Manucharyan 90+3' (pen.)	Summary	Prudnikov (yellow card) 44'; Salugin 61'	Stadium: SKB-Bank Arena; Attendance: 3,698; Referee: Alexey Nikolaev

1 November 2015 14	Spartak Moscow	0 – 1	Ural	Moscow
20:30 YET (UTC+5)	Tasci (yellow card) 34'; Granat (yellow card) 40'; Shirokov (yellow card) 61'; Zé Luís (yellow card) 85'	Report	Acevedo (yellow card) 42' (yellow-red card) 82', (goal) 80'; Khozin (yellow card) 72'	Stadium: Otkrytie Arena; Attendance: 16,228; Referee: Vladislav Bezborodov

7 November 2015 15	Ural	1 – 2	Rostov	Yekaterinburg
16:00 YET (UTC+5)	Manucharyan 6'; Fidler (yellow card) 61'	Summary	Poloz 14'; Rotenberg (yellow card) 48'; Bukharov (yellow card) 75'; Khozin 84' (o.g.); Kanga (yellow card) 86'	Stadium: SKB-Bank Arena; Attendance: 6,558; Referee: Aleksei Matyunin

21 November 2015 16	Zenit St. Petersburg	3 – 0	Ural	Saint Petersburg
18:30 YET (UTC+5)	Garay 12'; Shatov (yellow card) 55'; Dzyuba 76'; Yusupov (yellow card) 81'; García 89'	Report	Martynovich (yellow card) 49'	Stadium: Petrovsky Stadium; Attendance: 14,880; Referee: Sergey Karasev

27 November 2015 17	Ural	3 – 1	Mordovia Saransk	Yekaterinburg
19:00 YET (UTC+5)	Sapeta 37', 41'; Khozin (yellow card) 57'; Fidler (yellow card) 76'; Gogniyev 83'	Summary	Phibel 23'; Le Tallec (yellow card) 38'; Djaló (yellow card) 80'	Stadium: SKB-Bank Arena; Attendance: 2,450; Referee: Vladislav Bezborodov

4 December 2015 18	Lokomotiv Moscow	2 – 2	Ural	Moscow
21:00 YET (UTC+5)	Al.Miranchuk 17'; Yanbayev (yellow card) 54'; Škuletić (yellow card) 75'; Niasse 80'	Report	Sapeta 2'; Manucharyan 39'	Stadium: Lokomotiv Stadium; Attendance: 5,630; Referee: Sergey Ivanov

7 March 2016 19	Ural	1 – 1	Dynamo Moscow	Yekaterinburg
16:30 YET (UTC+5)	Stavpets (yellow card) 45'; Acevedo 63' (yellow card) 74'; Dantsev (yellow card) 68'	Report	Ionov 59'; Yeshchenko (yellow card) 79'	Stadium: Central Stadium; Attendance: 3,946; Referee: Vladislav Bezborodov

12 March 2016 20	Ural	4 – 2	Anzhi Makhachkala	Yekaterinburg
16:30 YET (UTC+5)	Gogniyev 10', 84', 90+1'; Sapeta 19'	Summary	Berisha 29'; Ebecilio (yellow card) 39'; Maksimov (yellow card) 61' (goal) 70'; Zhirov (yellow card) 82'	Stadium: SKB-Bank Arena; Attendance: 4,200; Referee: Igor Fedotov

19 March 2016 21	Terek Grozny	1 – 1	Ural	Grozny
19:00 YET (UTC+5)	Ivanov 33'; Rodolfo (yellow card) 90'; Adílson (yellow card) 90'	Summary	Dorozhkin 19'; Kulakov (yellow card) 40'; Yaroshenko (yellow card) 73'; Novikov (yellow card) 75'; Fontanello (yellow card) 90'	Stadium: Akhmat-Arena; Attendance: 17,532; Referee: Sergey Ivanov

2 April 2016 22	Ural	1 – 0	Ufa	Yekaterinburg
14:00 YEKT (UTC+5)	Gogniyev 24'; Yemelyanov (yellow card) 78'	Summary	Zubarev (yellow card) 47'; Igboun (yellow card) 60'; Handžić (yellow card) 89'	Stadium: SKB-Bank Arena; Attendance: 5,200; Referee: Sergey Karasev

10 April 2016 23	Krasnodar	6 – 0	Ural	Krasnodar
19:00 YET (UTC+5)	Smolov 18', 45+1', 56', 61'; Manucharyan 55' (o.g.); Wánderson 77'	Summary		Stadium: Kuban Stadium; Attendance: 8,850; Referee: Igor Fedotov

18 April 2016 24	Ural	0 – 1	Rubin Kazan	Yekaterinburg
19:00 YET (UTC+5)		Report	Bergström 75'; Tkachuk (yellow card) 90+2'	Stadium: SKB-Bank Arena; Attendance: 4,540; Referee: Aleksey Yeskov

23 April 2016 25	Krylia Sovetov	1 – 1	Ural	Samara
16:30 YET (UTC+5)	Rodić 78' (yellow card) 79'	Summary	Sapeta 12'; Yemelyanov (yellow card) 37'	Stadium: Metallurg Stadium; Attendance: 5,164; Referee: Aleksandr Egorov

28 April 2016 26	Ural	0 – 3	CSKA Moscow	Yekaterinburg
19:30 YET (UTC+5)	Fidler (yellow card) 31'; Dantsev (yellow card) 53'	Summary	Olanare 19'; Musa 60'; Dzagoev 76'	Stadium: SKB-Bank Arena; Attendance: 6,450; Referee: Sergey Lapochkin

8 May 2016 27	Amkar Perm	1 – 1	Ural	Perm
16:30 YET (UTC+5)	Gol 4'; Ogude (yellow card) 89' (yellow-red card) 90+3'; Butko (yellow card) 90+3'	Summary	Gogniyev 38'	Stadium: Zvezda Stadium; Attendance: 7,350; Referee: Aleksei Matyunin

12 May 2016 28	Ural	0 – 1	Spartak Moscow	Yekaterinburg
19:00 YET (UTC+5)	Merkulov (yellow card) 9'	Summary	Bryzgalov (yellow card) 32'; Promes 40'; Glushakov (yellow card) 70'; Rômulo (yellow card) 75'; Pesyakov (yellow card) 90+1'	Stadium: SKB-Bank Arena; Attendance: 6,495; Referee: Sergey Ivanov

16 May 2016 29	Rostov	1 – 0	Ural	Rostov-on-Don
21:30 YET (UTC+5)	Azmoun (yellow card) 24' (goal) 74'; Navas (yellow card) 39'; Yerokhin (yellow card) 61'	Report	Dantsev (yellow card) 20'; Fidler (yellow card) 31' (yellow-red card) 81'; Kulakov (yellow card) 80'; Lungu (yellow card) 81'	Stadium: Olimp-2; Attendance: 15,557; Referee: Sergey Karasev

21 May 2016 30	Ural	2 – 0	Kuban Krasnodar	Yekaterinburg
15:30 YET (UTC+5)	Gogniyev 31'; Sapeta 64'	Summary	Yakuba (yellow card) 38'	Stadium: SKB-Bank Arena; Attendance: 4,930; Referee: Igor Fedotov

==== League table ====
Pos	Team	Pld	W	D	L	GF	GA	GD	Pts
6	Lokomotiv Moscow	30	14	8	8	43	33	+10	50
7	Terek Grozny	30	11	11	8	35	30	+5	44
8	Ural Sverdlovsk Oblast	30	10	9	11	39	46	−7	39
9	Krylia Sovetov Samara	30	9	8	13	19	31	−12	35
10	Rubin Kazan	30	9	6	15	33	39	−6	33

Source: Russian Premier League, Soccerway
Rules for classification: 1) Points; 2) Matches won; 3) Head-to-head points; 4) Head-to-head matches won; 5) Head-to-head goal difference; 6) Head-to-head goals scored; 7) Head-to-head away goals; 8) Goal difference; 9) Goals scored; 10) Away goals scored.

=== Russian Cup ===
24 September 2015 Round of 32	Yenisey Krasnoyarsk	1 – 2	Ural	Krasnoyarsk
15:00 MSK (UTC+3)	Lescano 16' (pen.); Fatullayev (yellow card) 73'; Shelia (yellow card) 89'	Summary	Yaroshenko (yellow card) 45'; Stavpets 48'; Khozin (yellow card) 53'; Gogniyev 89'	Stadium: Central Stadium; Attendance: 2,500; Referee: Anton Anopa

28 October 2015 Round of 16	CSKA Moscow	2 – 1	Ural	Khimki
19:30 MSK (UTC+3)	Panchenko 47'; Tošić 86'	Summary	Acevedo (yellow card) 67'; Podberyozkin 79'	Stadium: Arena Khimki; Attendance: 3,000; Referee: Kirill Levnikov

== Squad statistics ==
As of Match played 21 May 2016

=== Appearances and goals ===
No.	Pos	Nat	Player	Total		Premier League		Russian Cup	
No.	Pos	Nat	Player	Apps	Goals	Apps	Goals	Apps	Goals
2	DF	(Russia) RUS	Vladimir Khozin	15	0	9+5	0	1	0
3	FW	(Zambia) ZAM	Chisamba Lungu	18	1	15+3	1	0	0
4	DF	(Belarus) BLR	Alyaksandr Martynovich	25	0	24	0	1	0
7	DF	(Russia) RUS	Aleksandr Dantsev	25	0	22+1	0	2	0
8	MF	(Ukraine) UKR	Kostyantyn Yaroshenko	11	0	3+6	0	1+1	0
9	FW	(Russia) RUS	Spartak Gogniyev	18	9	13+4	8	1	1
10	FW	(Armenia) ARM	Edgar Manucharyan	23	6	13+9	6	0+1	0
11	MF	(Russia) RUS	Aleksandr Stavpets	19	0	5+14	0	0	0
12	DF	(Russia) RUS	Aleksandr Novikov	8	0	6+1	0	1	0
15	MF	(Ukraine) UKR	Denys Kulakov	27	0	26	0	1	0
18	FW	(Russia) RUS	Nikita Burmistrov	14	0	6+6	0	2	0
21	MF	(Chile) CHI	Gerson Acevedo	23	6	20+2	6	1	0
25	MF	(Russia) RUS	Aleksandr Stavpets	1	1	0	0	0+1	1
28	GK	(Russia) RUS	Nikolai Zabolotny	10	0	10	0	0	0
29	DF	(Argentina) ARG	Pablo Fontanello	29	3	27	3	2	0
30	GK	(Belarus) BLR	Yuri Zhevnov	11	0	11	0	0	0
34	FW	(Russia) RUS	Denis Dorozhkin	10	1	3+6	1	0+1	0
35	GK	(Russia) RUS	Dmitri Arapov	11	0	9	0	2	0
41	MF	(Russia) RUS	Aleksandr Sapeta	31	7	27+2	7	1+1	0
54	MF	(Russia) RUS	Aleksandr Ryazantsev	11	0	6+5	0	0	0
57	MF	(Russia) RUS	Artyom Fidler	22	0	19+2	0	1	0
62	MF	(Russia) RUS	Rezo Gavtadze	1	0	0+1	0	0	0
71	FW	(Azerbaijan) AZE	Elbeyi Guliyev	1	0	0+1	0	0	0
75	MF	(Russia) RUS	Sergei Serchenkov	4	0	1+3	0	0	0
77	MF	(Ukraine) UKR	Dmytro Bilonoh	3	0	0+2	0	1	0
88	MF	(Russia) RUS	Dmitri Korobov	11	0	9+2	0	0	0
90	MF	(Russia) RUS	Aleksandr Scherbakov	4	0	1+3	0	0	0
92	MF	(Russia) RUS	Roman Yemelyanov	25	0	21+3	0	1	0
Players away from the club on loan:
Players who appeared for Ural Sverdlovsk Oblast no longer at the club:
14	MF	(Russia) RUS	Vyacheslav Podberyozkin	14	3	10+3	2	1	1
89	MF	(Russia) RUS	Aleksandr Yerokhin	14	0	12	0	2	0
98	FW	(Sweden) SWE	Carlos Strandberg	3	0	0+2	0	0+1	0

=== Goal scorers ===
Place	Position	Nation	Number	Name	Russian Premier League	Russian Cup	Total
1	FW	(Russia)	9	Spartak Gogniyev	8	1	9
2	MF	(Russia)	41	Aleksandr Sapeta	7	0	7
3	MF	(Chile)	21	Gerson Acevedo	6	0	6
3	FW	(Armenia)	10	Edgar Manucharyan	6	0	6
5	MF	(Russia)	89	Aleksandr Yerokhin	4	0	4
6	DF	(Argentina)	29	Pablo Fontanello	3	0	3
6	MF	(Russia)	14	Vyacheslav Podberyozkin	2	1	3
8	FW	(Zambia)	3	Chisamba Lungu	1	0	1
8	FW	(Russia)	34	Denis Dorozhkin	1	0	1
8	MF	(Russia)	25	Aleksandr Stavpets	0	1	1
8				Own goal	1	0	1
				TOTALS	39	3	42

=== Disciplinary record ===
Number	Nation	Position	Name	Russian Premier League		Russian Cup		Total	
Number	Nation	Position	Name	Yellow card	Red card	Yellow card	Red card	Yellow card	Red card
2	(Russia)	DF	Vladimir Khozin	2	0	1	0	3	0
3	(Zambia)	FW	Chisamba Lungu	1	0	0	0	1	0
4	(Belarus)	DF	Alyaksandr Martynovich	2	0	0	0	2	0
7	(Russia)	DF	Aleksandr Dantsev	5	0	0	0	5	0
8	(Ukraine)	MF	Kostyantyn Yaroshenko	1	0	1	0	2	0
11	(Russia)	MF	Aleksandr Stavpets	2	0	0	0	2	0
12	(Russia)	MF	Aleksandr Novikov	1	0	0	0	1	0
14	(Russia)	MF	Vyacheslav Podberyozkin	1	0	0	0	1	0
15	(Ukraine)	MF	Denys Kulakov	5	0	0	0	5	0
21	(Chile)	MF	Gerson Acevedo	3	1	1	0	4	1
29	(Argentina)	DF	Pablo Fontanello	2	0	0	0	2	0
34	(Russia)	FW	Denis Dorozhkin	1	0	0	0	1	0
41	(Russia)	MF	Aleksandr Sapeta	3	1	0	0	3	1
57	(Russia)	MF	Artyom Fidler	5	1	0	0	5	1
89	(Russia)	MF	Aleksandr Yerokhin	5	0	0	0	5	0
92	(Russia)	MF	Roman Yemelyanov	5	0	0	0	5	0
			TOTALS	44	1	3	0	47	1
