= 2016–17 FC Ural Sverdlovsk Oblast season =

Ural
2016–17 season
- Chairman: Grigori Ivanov
- Manager: Aleksandr Tarkhanov
- Stadium: SKB-Bank Arena
- Russian Premier League: 11th
- Russian Cup: Runners-up vs Lokomotiv Moscow
- Top goalscorer: League: Two Players (4); All: Vladimir Ilyin (6)
| Home colours | Away colours | Third colours |

The 2016–17 Ural season was the club's 4th successive season that the club played in the Russian Premier League, the highest tier of association football in Russia.

== Squad ==
As of 1 March 2017

Note: Flags indicate national team as defined under FIFA eligibility rules; some limited exceptions apply. Players may hold more than one non-FIFA nationality.

| No. | Pos. | Nation | Player |
|---|---|---|---|
| 1 | GK | RUS | Dmitri Arapov |
| 2 | DF | RUS | Vladimir Khozin |
| 3 | DF | GEO | Jemal Tabidze |
| 4 | DF | SLO | Gregor Balažic |
| 5 | DF | SRB | Dominik Dinga |
| 6 | MF | ROU | Eric Bicfalvi |
| 7 | DF | RUS | Aleksandr Dantsev |
| 8 | MF | RUS | Aleksandr Pavlenko |
| 9 | FW | RUS | Roman Pavlyuchenko |
| 10 | MF | ZAM | Chisamba Lungu |
| 11 | FW | RUS | Aleksandr Stavpets |
| 12 | DF | RUS | Aleksandr Novikov |
| 13 | DF | SRB | Radovan Pankov |
| 14 | FW | CIV | Jean-Jacques Bougouhi |
| 15 | DF | UKR | Denys Kulakov |
| 16 | GK | RUS | Aleksandr Shubin |
| 17 | MF | BUL | Nikolay Dimitrov |

| No. | Pos. | Nation | Player |
|---|---|---|---|
| 18 | FW | RUS | Vladimir Ilyin |
| 27 | DF | RUS | Mikhail Merkulov |
| 28 | GK | RUS | Nikolai Zabolotny |
| 32 | MF | RUS | Nikita Glushkov |
| 39 | FW | GEO | Giorgi Chanturia |
| 53 | MF | RUS | Sergei Podoksyonov |
| 57 | MF | RUS | Artyom Fidler (captain) |
| 62 | MF | RUS | Rezo Gavtadze |
| 77 | MF | RUS | Dmitri Korobov |
| 80 | MF | RUS | Aleksandr Lomakin |
| 85 | MF | RUS | Sergei Serchenkov |
| 90 | MF | RUS | Aleksandr Scherbakov |
| 92 | MF | RUS | Roman Yemelyanov |
| 96 | GK | RUS | Andrei Timofeyev |
| 99 | FW | ARM | Edgar Manucharyan |

=== Youth team ===
As per Russian Football Premier League. Note: Flags indicate national team as defined under FIFA eligibility rules; some limited exceptions apply. Players may hold more than one non-FIFA nationality.

| No. | Pos. | Nation | Player |
|---|---|---|---|
| 20 | GK | RUS | Yevgeni Zharikov |
| 21 | DF | RUS | Dmitri Borovkov |
| 22 | DF | RUS | Kirill Kochnev |
| 30 | MF | RUS | Maksim Yashkin |
| 31 | MF | RUS | Pavel Kirillov |
| 33 | MF | RUS | Vartan Karkaryan |
| 34 | MF | RUS | Yan Chizhkov |
| 35 | FW | RUS | Yevgeni Tatarinov |
| 36 | DF | RUS | Aleksei Fakhrutdinov |
| 37 | DF | RUS | Kirill Karabanov |
| 38 | FW | RUS | Vladislav Blinov |
| 40 | DF | RUS | Maksim Gorin |
| 43 | MF | RUS | Aleksandr Golubtsov |
| 45 | MF | RUS | Ilya Korelin |
| 46 | DF | RUS | Vyacheslav Berdnikov |
| 48 | DF | RUS | Denis Drozhalkin |
| 50 | MF | RUS | Grigori Senatorov |

| No. | Pos. | Nation | Player |
|---|---|---|---|
| 51 | DF | RUS | Roman Shalin |
| 54 | MF | RUS | Nikita Muromsky |
| 55 | DF | RUS | Pavel Vlasenko |
| 58 | FW | RUS | Bogdan Mishukov |
| 60 | GK | RUS | Vladislav Poletayev |
| 65 | MF | RUS | Dmitri Khlyoskin |
| 69 | MF | RUS | Andrey Sheptiy |
| 71 | GK | RUS | Aleksei Mamin |
| 72 | DF | RUS | Osman Suleymanov |
| 73 | FW | RUS | Konstantin Reshetnikov |
| 74 | DF | RUS | Danil Chernov |
| 81 | MF | RUS | Aleksei Gontsa |
| 82 | DF | RUS | Volodya Israelyan |
| 87 | MF | RUS | Rustam Nisafutdinov |
| 88 | MF | RUS | Aleksandr Bunakov |
| 93 | FW | RUS | Lev Popov |
| 97 | MF | RUS | Eduard Valiakhmetov |

== Transfers ==
=== Summer ===
In: Note: Flags indicate national team as defined under FIFA eligibility rules; some limited exceptions apply. Players may hold more than one non-FIFA nationality.

| No. | Pos. | Nation | Player |
|---|---|---|---|
| 8 | MF | RUS | Aleksandr Pavlenko (from (Russia) Shinnik Yaroslavl) |
| 9 | FW | RUS | Roman Pavlyuchenko (from (Russia) Kuban Krasnodar) |
| 13 | DF | SRB | Radovan Pankov (from (Serbia) Vojvodina) |
| 14 | FW | CIV | Jean-Jacques Bougouhi (from (Russia) Armavir) |
| 21 | DF | RUS | Dmitri Borovkov (from (Russia) Kvant Obninsk) |
| 25 | MF | KAZ | Georgy Zhukov (from (Belgium) Standard Liège) |
| 33 | MF | RUS | Vartan Karkaryan |
| 39 | FW | GEO | Giorgi Chanturia (from (Germany) MSV Duisburg) |
| 43 | MF | RUS | Aleksandr Golubtsov |
| 46 | DF | RUS | Vyacheslav Berdnikov |
| 60 | GK | RUS | Vladislav Poletayev |
| 65 | MF | RUS | Dmitri Khlyoskin |
| 72 | DF | RUS | Osman Suleymanov |
| 82 | DF | RUS | Volodya Israelyan |
| 86 | FW | CIV | Mohamed Konaté (from (Moldova) Saxan) |
| 88 | MF | RUS | Aleksandr Bunakov |
| 93 | FW | RUS | Lev Popov |

Out: Note: Flags indicate national team as defined under FIFA eligibility rules; some limited exceptions apply. Players may hold more than one non-FIFA nationality.

| No. | Pos. | Nation | Player |
|---|---|---|---|
| 4 | DF | BLR | Alyaksandr Martynovich (end of loan from (Russia) Krasnodar) |
| 8 | MF | UKR | Kostyantyn Yaroshenko (to (Ukraine) Karpaty Lviv) |
| 9 | FW | RUS | Spartak Gogniyev (to (Russia) Kuban Krasnodar) |
| 17 | DF | RUS | Artemi Dorozhinsky |
| 10 | FW | ARM | Edgar Manucharyan (to (Thailand) Ratchaburi Mitr Phol) |
| 18 | FW | RUS | Nikita Burmistrov (end of loan from (Russia) Krasnodar) |
| 20 | DF | RUS | Roman Mironov |
| 21 | MF | CHI | Gerson Acevedo (to (Kazakhstan) Kairat) |
| 30 | GK | BLR | Yuri Zhevnov |
| 34 | FW | RUS | Denis Dorozhkin (to (Russia) Tambov) |
| 37 | MF | RUS | Yevgeni Shumikhin |
| 41 | MF | RUS | Aleksandr Sapeta (to (Russia) Dynamo Moscow) |
| 47 | DF | RUS | Artyom Vakurin |
| 54 | MF | RUS | Aleksandr Ryazantsev (end of loan from (Russia) Zenit St. Petersburg) |
| 61 | DF | RUS | Pavel Parshin |
| 64 | MF | RUS | Vladislav Zolotukhin (to (Russia) Rotor Volgograd) |
| 70 | MF | RUS | Dmitri Davletshin |
| 71 | FW | AZE | Elbeyi Guliyev |
| 76 | MF | RUS | Mikhail Filippov |
| 77 | MF | UKR | Dmytro Bilonoh (on loan to (Ukraine) Zirka Kropyvnytskyi) |
| 80 | DF | RUS | Yegor Zlygostev |
| 83 | DF | RUS | Aleksei Gerasimov (on loan to (Belarus) Belshina Bobruisk, previously on loan to (Russia) Volga-Olimpiyets Nizhny Novgorod) |
| 84 | DF | RUS | Yevgeni Ivanov |
| 91 | FW | RUS | Nikita Durandin |
| 95 | FW | RUS | Aleksandr Babushkin |
| — | DF | RUS | Denis Fomin (on loan to (Russia) Tekstilshchik Ivanovo, previously on loan to (Russia) Tambov) |
| — | MF | RUS | Ivan Chudin (to (Russia) Tyumen, previously on loan) |

=== Winter ===
In: Note: Flags indicate national team as defined under FIFA eligibility rules; some limited exceptions apply. Players may hold more than one non-FIFA nationality.

| No. | Pos. | Nation | Player |
|---|---|---|---|
| 3 | DF | GEO | Jemal Tabidze (on loan from (Belgium) Gent II) |
| 4 | DF | SLO | Gregor Balažic (from (Serbia) Partizan) |
| 6 | MF | ROU | Eric Bicfalvi (from (Russia) Tom Tomsk) |
| 17 | MF | BUL | Nikolay Dimitrov (from (Bulgaria) Slavia Sofia) |
| 18 | FW | RUS | Vladimir Ilyin (from (Russia) Kuban Krasnodar) |
| 30 | MF | RUS | Maksim Yashkin |
| 31 | MF | RUS | Pavel Kirillov |
| 32 | MF | RUS | Nikita Glushkov (from (Russia) Sibir Novosibirsk) |
| 34 | MF | RUS | Yan Chizhkov |
| 35 | FW | RUS | Yevgeni Tatarinov |
| 36 | DF | RUS | Aleksei Fakhrutdinov |
| 37 | DF | RUS | Kirill Karabanov |
| 50 | MF | RUS | Grigori Senatorov |
| 54 | MF | RUS | Nikita Muromsky |
| 80 | MF | RUS | Aleksandr Lomakin (from (Russia) Yenisey Krasnoyarsk) |
| 99 | FW | ARM | Edgar Manucharyan (from (Thailand) Ratchaburi Mitr Phol) |
| — | DF | RUS | Aleksei Gerasimov (end of loan to (Belarus) Belshina Bobruisk) |
| — | DF | RUS | Ivan Knyazev (end of loan to (Latvia) Riga) |

Out: Note: Flags indicate national team as defined under FIFA eligibility rules; some limited exceptions apply. Players may hold more than one non-FIFA nationality.

| No. | Pos. | Nation | Player |
|---|---|---|---|
| 19 | FW | RUS | Valeri Kuznetsov (to (Russia) Tyumen) |
| 25 | MF | KAZ | Georgy Zhukov (to (Kazakhstan) Kairat) |
| 29 | DF | ARG | Pablo Fontanello (to (Kazakhstan) Ordabasy) |
| 86 | FW | CIV | Mohamed Konaté |
| 94 | FW | RUS | Georgi Nurov (to (Belgium) Patro Eisden) |

== Competitions ==
=== Russian Premier League ===
==== Results by round ====
| Round | 1 | 2 | 3 | 4 | 5 | 6 | 7 | 8 | 9 | 10 | 11 | 12 | 13 | 14 | 15 | 16 | 17 | 18 | 19 | 20 | 21 | 22 | 23 | 24 | 25 | 26 | 27 | 28 | 29 | 30 |
|---|---|---|---|---|---|---|---|---|---|---|---|---|---|---|---|---|---|---|---|---|---|---|---|---|---|---|---|---|---|---|
| Ground | | | | | | | | | | | | | | | | | | | | | | | | | | | | | | |
| Result | | | | | | | | | | | | | | | | | | | | | | | | | | | | | | |
| Position | | | | | | | | | | | | | | | | | | | | | | | | | | | | | | |

Updated to match(es) played on 2 June 2016. Source: Russian Premier League
A = Away; H = Home; W = Win; D = Draw; L = Loss

==== Matches ====
| 31 July 2016 1 | Ural Yekaterinburg | 2 – 0 | Ufa | Yekaterinburg |
| 17:30 YEKT (UTC+5) | Yemelyanov 5'; Dantsev (yellow card) 38'; Pavlyuchenko 43' | Summary | Vaněk (yellow card) 40'; Stotsky (yellow card) 44' | Stadium: SKB-Bank Arena; Attendance: 7,850; Referee: Sergey Ivanov |

| 7 August 2016 2 | Rostov | 0 – 0 | Ural Yekaterinburg | Rostov-on-Don |
| 23:30 YEKT (UTC+5) | Azmoun (red card) 22'; Gațcan (yellow card) 25'; Bukharov (yellow card) 45+2' | Summary | Fidler (yellow card) 25'; Pavlyuchenko (yellow card) 25'; Yemelyanov (yellow card) 56'; Fontanello (yellow card) 65' | Stadium: Olimp-2; Attendance: 8,494; Referee: Igor Fedotov |

| 13 August 2016 3 | Ural Yekaterinburg | 0 – 1 | CSKA Moscow | Yekaterinburg |
| 17:30 YEKT (UTC+5) | Lungu (yellow card) 19' | Summary | Milanov 90+4' | Stadium: SKB-Bank Arena; Attendance: 8,800; Referee: Kirill Levnikov |

| 21 August 2016 4 | Amkar Perm | 1 – 0 | Ural Yekaterinburg | Perm |
| 17:30 YEKT (UTC+5) | Bodul 63' | Summary | | Stadium: Zvezda Stadium; Attendance: 7,900; Referee: Alexey Nikolaev |

| 28 August 2016 5 | Ural Yekaterinburg | 1 – 1 | Arsenal Tula | Yekaterinburg |
| 19:00 YEKT (UTC+5) | Lungu 87' | Summary | Vlasov 48'; Denisov (yellow card) 57'; Gorbanets (yellow card) 85'; Filtsov (yellow card) 90+5' | Stadium: SKB-Bank Arena; Attendance: 6,556; Referee: Roman Galimov |

| 12 September 2016 6 | Rubin Kazan | 3 – 1 | Ural Yekaterinburg | Kazan |
| 21:30 YEKT (UTC+5) | Novikov 29' (o.g.); Nabiullin (yellow card) 37'; Tkachuk 70'; Lestienne 76' | Summary | Yemelyanov (yellow card) 18'; Pavlyuchenko (yellow card) 77' (goal) 87' | Stadium: Central Stadium; Attendance: 5,399; Referee: Kirill Levnikov |

| 17 September 2016 7 | Ural Yekaterinburg | 0 – 1 | Anzhi Makhachkala | Yekaterinburg |
| 18:30 YEKT (UTC+5) | | Summary | Obertan 25'; Parshivlyuk (yellow card) 87'; Iličević (yellow card) 90+1' | Stadium: SKB-Bank Arena; Attendance: 4,800; Referee: Sergey Lapochkin |

| 25 September 2016 8 | Orenburg | 0 – 1 | Ural Yekaterinburg | Orenburg |
| 14:00 YEKT (UTC+5) | Bamba (yellow card) 45+1'; Batov (yellow card) 90' | Summary | Fidler (yellow card) 45+1'; Pavlyuchenko 60' | Stadium: Gazovik Stadium; Attendance: 5,000; Referee: Mikhail Vilkov |

| 1 October 2016 9 | Tom Tomsk | 1 – 1 | Ural Yekaterinburg | Tomsk |
| 14:00 YEKT (UTC+5) | Pugin 23'; Vranješ (yellow card) 55'; Droppa (yellow card) 77' | Summary | Fontanello 45'; Chanturia (yellow card) 51'; Yemelyanov (yellow card) 90' | Stadium: Trud Stadium; Attendance: 2,950; Referee: Vitaly Meshkov |

| 16 October 2016 10 | Ural Yekaterinburg | 0 – 2 | Zenit St.Petersburg | Yekaterinburg |
| 16:00 YEKT (UTC+5) | Pavlyuchenko (yellow card) 54' | Summary | Shatov 22'; Neto (yellow card) 69'; Yusupov 89' | Stadium: SKB-Bank Arena; Attendance: 8,500; Referee: Igor Fedotov |

| 22 October 2016 11 | Ural Yekaterinburg | 0 – 1 | Spartak Moscow | Yekaterinburg |
| 19:00 YEKT (UTC+5) | Kulakov (yellow card) 85'; Pavlyuchenko (yellow card) 87' | Summary | Melgarejo 48'; Kutepov (yellow card) 72' | Stadium: SKB-Bank Arena; Attendance: 8,600; Referee: Alexander Yegorov |

| 30 October 2016 12 | Ural Yekaterinburg | 1 – 4 | Terek Grozny | Yekaterinburg |
| 14:00 YEKT (UTC+5) | Chanturia 11' (pen.) | Summary | Balaj 43', 56'; Ivanov (yellow card) 55'; Dinga 59' (o.g.); Mbengue 90+1' | Stadium: SKB-Bank Arena; Attendance: 3,050; Referee: Aleksey Eskov |

| 5 November 2016 13 | Krylia Sovetov | 2 – 2 | Ural Yekaterinburg | Samara |
| 18:00 YEKT (UTC+5) | Rodić (yellow card) 37'; Kornilenko 45+2', 65'; Bashkirov (yellow card) 74' | Summary | Dantsev (yellow card) 2'; Kulakov (yellow card) 9'; Korobov 22'; Pavlyuchenko (yellow card) 70'; Chanturia 73'; Fidler (yellow card) 90' | Stadium: Metallurg Stadium; Attendance: 3,447; Referee: Vladislav Bezborodov |

| 20 November 2016 14 | Krasnodar | 3 – 0 | Ural Yekaterinburg | Krasnodar |
| 16:30 YEKT (UTC+5) | Gazinsky 66'; Smolov 71'; Joãozinho 74' | Summary | Dantsev (yellow card) 19'; Podoksyonov (yellow card) 64' | Stadium: Krasnodar Stadium; Attendance: 17,304; Referee: Mikhail Vilkov |

| 26 November 2016 15 | Lokomotiv Moscow | 1 – 1 | Ural Yekaterinburg | Moscow |
| 19:00 YEKT (UTC+5) | Ćorluka (yellow card) 43'; Denisov (yellow card) 50'; Pejčinović 85' | Summary | Stavpets (yellow card) 8'; Pavlenko (yellow card) 42'; Fidler 90+2' | Stadium: Lokomotiv Stadium; Attendance: 6,114; Referee: Vladimir Seldyakov |

| 30 November 2016 16 | Ural Yekaterinburg | 1 – 0 | Rostov | Yekaterinburg |
| 19:00 YEKT (UTC+5) | Lungu 38' (yellow card) 38' | Summary | Prepeliță (yellow card) 29'; Gueye (yellow card) 55' | Stadium: SKB-Bank Arena; Attendance: 2,340; Referee: Aleksey Eskov |

| 3 December 2016 17 | CSKA Moscow | 4 – 0 | Ural Yekaterinburg | Moscow |
| 16:00 YEKT (UTC+5) | Traoré 25', 35'; Natkho 38' (pen.); Chalov 40' | Summary | Novikov (yellow card) 37'; Fontanello (yellow card) 67' | Stadium: Arena CSKA; Attendance: 7,000; Referee: Aleksey Sukhoy |

| 5 March 2017 18 | Ural Yekaterinburg | 1 – 0 | Amkar Perm | Yekaterinburg |
| 13:30 YEKT (UTC+5) | Bicfalvi 32'; Ilyin (yellow card) 36'; Zabolotny (yellow card) 90+2' | Summary | Condé (yellow card) 27'; Zaytsev (yellow card) 36' | Stadium: SKB-Bank Arena; Attendance: 4,570; Referee: Mikhail Vilkov |

| 10 March 2017 19 | Arsenal Tula | 2 – 0 | Ural Yekaterinburg | Tula |
| 19:00 MSK (UTC+3) | Doumbia (yellow card) 3'; Rasic 19' (pen.), 62' (yellow card) 42'; Burmistrov (yellow card) 76' | Summary | Fidler (yellow card) 52'; Balažic (yellow card) 61' (yellow-red card) 65' | Stadium: Arsenal Stadium; Attendance: 10,200; Referee: Sergey Lapochkin |

| 18 March 2017 20 | Ural Yekaterinburg | 1 – 0 | Rubin Kazan | Yekaterinburg |
| 16:00 YEKT (UTC+5) | Ilyin 11'; Bicfalvi (yellow card) 69'; Korobov (yellow card) 83' | Summary | Jonathas (yellow card) 80' | Stadium: SKB-Bank Arena; Attendance: 4,813; Referee: Vitaly Meshkov |

| 31 March 2017 21 | Anzhi Makhachkala | 2 – 3 | Ural Yekaterinburg | Kaspiysk |
| 21:30 YEKT (UTC+5) | Prudnikov 49'; Khubulov 53'; Phibel (yellow card) 83' | Summary | Ilyin 22'; Yemelyanov (yellow card) 34'; Dantsev (yellow card) 45+1'; Manucharyan (yellow card) 53' (goal) 88'; Gasanov 57' (o.g.); Bicfalvi (yellow card) 61' | Stadium: Anzhi Arena; Attendance: 3,950; Referee: Sergey Ivanov |

| 10 April 2017 22 | Ural Yekaterinburg | 2 – 0 | Orenburg | Yekaterinburg |
| 19:30 YEKT (UTC+5) | Novikov (yellow card) 21'; Ilyin 26'; Fidler (yellow card) 82'; Lungu 90' | Summary | Poluyakhtov (yellow card) 25'; Malykh (yellow card) 40'; Georgiev (yellow card) 67'; Oyewole (yellow card) 87' | Stadium: SKB-Bank Arena; Attendance: 3,917; Referee: Evgeny Turbin |

| 16 April 2017 23 | Ural Yekaterinburg | 1 – 0 | Tom Tomsk | Yekaterinburg |
| 17:00 YEKT (UTC+5) | Dantsev (yellow card) 34'; Bicfalvi 40' | Summary | Sasin (yellow card) 87'; Makurin (yellow card) 89' | Stadium: SKB-Bank Arena; Attendance: 3,017; Referee: Aleksei Matyunin |

| 22 April 2017 24 | Zenit St.Petersburg | 2 – 0 | Ural Yekaterinburg | Saint Petersburg |
| 16:00 YEKT (UTC+5) | Ivanović 86'; Dzyuba (yellow card) 86'; Criscito (yellow card) 89'; Mollo 90+3' | Summary | Bicfalvi (yellow card) 23' (yellow-red card) 60'; Yemelyanov (yellow card) 40' (yellow-red card) 86'; Pavlyuchenko (yellow card) 61' (red card) 61' | Stadium: Krestovsky Stadium; Attendance: 2,004; Referee: Aleksey Eskov |

| 25 April 2017 25 | Spartak Moscow | 1 – 0 | Ural Yekaterinburg | Moscow |
| 21:30 YEKT (UTC+5) | Fernando 23'; Popov (yellow card) 51' | Summary | Balažic (yellow card) 73' | Stadium: Otkrytiye Arena; Attendance: 30,823; Referee: Vladimir Seldyakov |

| 29 April 2017 26 | Terek Grozny | 5 – 2 | Ural Yekaterinburg | Grozny |
| 21:00 YEKT (UTC+5) | Mbengue 33', 63'; Sadayev 67'; Lebedenko 83'; Mohammadi 90+2' | Summary | Pavlyuchenko 21'; Pankov (yellow card) 36'; Scherbakov (yellow card) 56'; Manucharyan 82' | Stadium: Akhmat-Arena; Attendance: 12,168; Referee: Artem Chistyakov |

| 8 May 2017 27 | Ural Yekaterinburg | 1 – 3 | Krylia Sovetov | Yekaterinburg |
| 16:30 YEKT (UTC+5) | Ilyin 2' | Summary | Tkachyov (yellow card) 27'; Kornilenko (yellow card) 37'; Bruno 54', 75'; Bozhin (yellow card) 64'; Pasquato 89' | Stadium: SKB-Bank Arena; Attendance: 4,100; Referee: Evgeny Turbin |

| 13 May 2017 28 | Ural Yekaterinburg | 1 – 1 | Krasnodar | Yekaterinburg |
| 14:00 YEKT (UTC+5) | Naldo 42' (o.g.) | Report | Pereyra (yellow card) 50'; Naldo (yellow card) 64'; Claesson 90+2'; Torbinski (yellow card) 90+4' | Stadium: SKB-Bank Arena; Attendance: 3,300; Referee: Alexey Nikolaev |

| 17 May 2017 29 | Ural Yekaterinburg | 1 – 2 | Lokomotiv Moscow | Yekaterinburg |
| 19:30 YEKT (UTC+5) | Lungu (yellow card) 56'; Kvirkvelia 78' (o.g.); Ilyin (yellow card) 83' | Report | Pejčinović 33'; Fernandes 44' (pen.); An.Miranchuk (yellow card) 53' (yellow-red card) 61'; Al.Miranchuk (yellow card) 64'; Tarasov (yellow card) 90+4' | Stadium: SKB-Bank Arena; Attendance: 5,570; Referee: Vladislav Bezborodov |

| 21 May 2017 30 | Ufa | 1 – 0 | Ural Yekaterinburg | Ufa |
| 17:00 YEKT (UTC+5) | Fatai 38' | Report | | Stadium: Neftyanik Stadium; Attendance: 5,200; Referee: Vladimir Seldyakov |

==== League table ====
| Pos | Team | Pld | W | D | L | GF | GA | GD | Pts | Qualification or relegation |
|---|---|---|---|---|---|---|---|---|---|---|
| 9 | Rubin Kazan | 30 | 10 | 8 | 12 | 30 | 34 | −4 | 38 | |
| 10 | Amkar Perm | 30 | 8 | 11 | 11 | 25 | 29 | −4 | 35 | |
| 11 | Ural Yekaterinburg | 30 | 8 | 6 | 16 | 24 | 44 | −20 | 30 | |
| 12 | Anzhi Makhachkala | 30 | 7 | 9 | 14 | 24 | 38 | −14 | 30 (Note: Anzhi Makhachkala ahead of Orenburg on head-to-head points; Orenburg–Anzhi Makhachkala 0–0, Anzhi Makhachkala–Orenburg 1–0.) | |
| 13 | Orenburg (R) | 30 | 7 | 9 | 14 | 25 | 36 | −11 | 30 | Qualification for the Relegation play-offs |

Source: Russian Premier League, Soccerway
Rules for classification: 1) Points; 2) Matches won; 3) Head-to-head points; 4) Head-to-head matches won; 5) Head-to-head goal difference; 6) Head-to-head goals scored; 7) Head-to-head away goals; 8) Goal difference; 9) Goals scored; 10) Away goals scored.
(R) Relegated

=== Russian Cup ===
| 21 September 2016 Round of 32 | Chelyabinsk | 0 – 3 | Ural Yekaterinburg | Chelyabinsk |
| 16:00 YEKT (UTC+5) | Vitali Korkin (yellow card) 81' | Summary | Chanturia 15', 50'; Konaté 35' | Stadium: Central Stadium; Attendance: 4,500; Referee: Yuri Aponasenko |

| 26 October 2016 Round of 16 | Amkar Perm | 1 – 1 (a.e.t.) (2 – 4 p) | Ural Yekaterinburg | Perm |
| 19:00 YEKT (UTC+5) | Gigolayev 74'; Gol (yellow card) 77'; Condé (yellow card) 81'; Dzhikiya (yellow card) 86'; Zanev (yellow card) 90'; Jovičić (yellow card) 90+3' | Summary | Fontanello 38'; Dantsev (yellow card) 77' | Stadium: Zvezda Stadium; Attendance: 5,100; Referee: Roman Galimov |
| | Penalties |
| | Zanev (penalty scored); Gigolayev (penalty missed); Jovičić (penalty scored); Prokofyev (penalty missed) | | (penalty scored) Chanturia; (penalty scored) Fontanello; (penalty scored) Podoksyonov; (penalty scored) Lungu |

| 28 February 2017 Quarterfinal | Ural Yekaterinburg | 3 – 3 (a.e.t.) (4 – 3 p) | Krasnodar | Krasnodar |
| 21:30 YEKT (UTC+5) | Ilyin 34'; Bicfalvi 53', 65'; Kulakov (yellow card) 61'; Dantsev (yellow card) 74' (yellow-red card) 92'; Novikov (yellow card) 116' | Summary | Smolov 1'; Claesson 14', 32'; Naldo (yellow card) 43'; Laborde (yellow card) 76'; Granqvist (yellow card) 90'; Gazinsky (yellow card) 100' | Stadium: Krasnodar Stadium; Attendance: 10,201; Referee: Kirill Levnikov |
| | Penalties |
| | Bicfalvi (penalty scored); Manucharyan (penalty scored); Yemelyanov (penalty scored); Fidler (penalty scored) | | Ramírez (penalty missed); Laborde (penalty scored); Granqvist (penalty scored); Smolov (penalty missed); Claesson (penalty scored) |

| 6 April 2017 Semifinal | Ural Yekaterinburg | 2 – 1 | Rubin Kazan | Yekaterinburg |
| 19:00 YEKT (UTC+5) | Ilyin 13'; Novikov 58'; Kulakov (yellow card) 81' | Summary | Jonathas 31'; Kambolov (yellow card) 87' | Stadium: SKB-Bank Arena; Attendance: 8,350; Referee: Aleksey Eskov |

==== Final ====
| 2 May 2017 Final | Ural Yekaterinburg | 0 – 2 | Lokomotiv Moscow | Sochi |
| 18:45 MSK (UTC+3) | Lungu (yellow card) 49'; Ilyin (yellow card) 69'; Fidler (red card) 90+7'; Manucharyan (red card) 90+7' | RPFL Report | I.Denisov 76'; Al.Miranchuk 90+1'; Farfán (red card) 90+7'; Ari (red card) 90+7' | Stadium: Fisht Olympic Stadium; Attendance: 24,500; Referee: Aleksei Nikolaev |

== Squad statistics ==
As of Match played 21 May 2017

=== Appearances and goals ===
| No. | Pos | Nat | Player | Total | | Premier League | | Russian Cup | |
| No. | Pos | Nat | Player | Apps | Goals | Apps | Goals | Apps | Goals |
|---|---|---|---|---|---|---|---|---|---|
| 1 | GK | (Russia) RUS | Dmitri Arapov | 8 | 0 | 7 | 0 | 1 | 0 |
| 2 | DF | (Russia) RUS | Vladimir Khozin | 1 | 0 | 0+1 | 0 | 0 | 0 |
| 3 | DF | (Georgia (country)) GEO | Jemal Tabidze | 4 | 0 | 3 | 0 | 1 | 0 |
| 4 | DF | (Slovenia) SLO | Gregor Balažic | 14 | 0 | 11 | 0 | 3 | 0 |
| 5 | DF | (Serbia) SRB | Dominik Dinga | 22 | 0 | 18+2 | 0 | 2 | 0 |
| 6 | MF | (Romania) ROU | Eric Bicfalvi | 12 | 4 | 9 | 2 | 3 | 2 |
| 7 | DF | (Russia) RUS | Aleksandr Dantsev | 31 | 0 | 26+1 | 0 | 4 | 0 |
| 8 | MF | (Russia) RUS | Aleksandr Pavlenko | 21 | 0 | 12+7 | 0 | 2 | 0 |
| 9 | FW | (Russia) RUS | Roman Pavlyuchenko | 23 | 4 | 16+5 | 4 | 2 | 0 |
| 10 | MF | (Zambia) ZAM | Chisamba Lungu | 33 | 3 | 27+2 | 3 | 4 | 0 |
| 11 | DF | (Russia) RUS | Aleksandr Stavpets | 15 | 0 | 4+10 | 0 | 1 | 0 |
| 12 | DF | (Russia) RUS | Aleksandr Novikov | 22 | 1 | 15+2 | 0 | 4+1 | 1 |
| 13 | DF | (Serbia) SRB | Radovan Pankov | 6 | 0 | 5 | 0 | 1 | 0 |
| 14 | FW | (Ivory Coast) CIV | Jean-Jacques Bougouhi | 3 | 0 | 0+2 | 0 | 0+1 | 0 |
| 15 | MF | (Ukraine) UKR | Denys Kulakov | 32 | 0 | 30 | 0 | 2 | 0 |
| 17 | MF | (Bulgaria) BUL | Nikolay Dimitrov | 15 | 0 | 12 | 0 | 3 | 0 |
| 18 | FW | (Russia) RUS | Vladimir Ilyin | 15 | 6 | 12 | 4 | 3 | 2 |
| 27 | DF | (Russia) RUS | Mikhail Merkulov | 14 | 0 | 6+5 | 0 | 1+2 | 0 |
| 28 | GK | (Russia) RUS | Nikolai Zabolotny | 26 | 0 | 22 | 0 | 4 | 0 |
| 32 | MF | (Russia) RUS | Nikita Glushkov | 3 | 0 | 1+1 | 0 | 0+1 | 0 |
| 39 | MF | (Georgia (country)) GEO | Giorgi Chanturia | 14 | 4 | 8+4 | 2 | 2 | 2 |
| 53 | MF | (Russia) RUS | Sergei Podoksyonov | 11 | 0 | 3+6 | 0 | 1+1 | 0 |
| 57 | MF | (Russia) RUS | Artyom Fidler | 27 | 1 | 23+1 | 1 | 2+1 | 0 |
| 77 | MF | (Russia) RUS | Dmitri Korobov | 19 | 1 | 10+7 | 1 | 1+1 | 0 |
| 79 | FW | (Russia) RUS | Artyom Yusupov | 1 | 0 | 0+1 | 0 | 0 | 0 |
| 80 | MF | (Russia) RUS | Aleksandr Lomakin | 2 | 0 | 1+1 | 0 | 0 | 0 |
| 85 | MF | (Russia) RUS | Sergei Serchenkov | 6 | 0 | 2+4 | 0 | 0 | 0 |
| 90 | MF | (Russia) RUS | Aleksandr Scherbakov | 3 | 0 | 1+1 | 0 | 0+1 | 0 |
| 92 | MF | (Russia) RUS | Roman Yemelyanov | 28 | 1 | 23 | 1 | 5 | 0 |
| 96 | GK | (Russia) RUS | Andrei Timofeyev | 1 | 0 | 1 | 0 | 0 | 0 |
| 99 | FW | (Armenia) ARM | Edgar Manucharyan | 15 | 2 | 5+7 | 2 | 0+3 | 0 |
Players away from the club on loan:
Players who appeared for Ural Yekaterinburg no longer at the club:
| 25 | MF | (Kazakhstan) KAZ | Georgy Zhukov | 6 | 0 | 1+3 | 0 | 0+2 | 0 |
| 29 | DF | (Argentina) ARG | Pablo Fontanello | 18 | 2 | 16 | 1 | 2 | 1 |
| 86 | FW | (Ivory Coast) CIV | Mohamed Konaté | 5 | 1 | 0+4 | 0 | 1 | 1 |

=== Goal scorers ===
| Place | Position | Nation | Number | Name | Premier League | Russian Cup | Total |
|---|---|---|---|---|---|---|---|
| 1 | FW | (Russia) | 18 | Vladimir Ilyin | 4 | 2 | 6 |
| 2 | FW | (Russia) | 9 | Roman Pavlyuchenko | 4 | 0 | 4 |
| 2 | MF | (Georgia (country)) | 39 | Giorgi Chanturia | 2 | 2 | 4 |
| 2 | MF | (Romania) | 6 | Eric Bicfalvi | 2 | 2 | 4 |
| 5 | MF | (Zambia) | 10 | Chisamba Lungu | 3 | 0 | 3 |
| 5 | | | | Own goal | 3 | 0 | 3 |
| 7 | FW | (Armenia) | 99 | Edgar Manucharyan | 2 | 0 | 2 |
| 7 | DF | (Argentina) | 29 | Pablo Fontanello | 1 | 1 | 2 |
| 9 | MF | (Russia) | 92 | Roman Yemelyanov | 1 | 0 | 1 |
| 9 | MF | (Russia) | 77 | Dmitri Korobov | 1 | 0 | 1 |
| 9 | MF | (Russia) | 57 | Artyom Fidler | 1 | 0 | 1 |
| 9 | FW | (Ivory Coast) | 86 | Mohamed Konaté | 0 | 1 | 1 |
| 9 | MF | (Russia) | 12 | Aleksandr Novikov | 0 | 1 | 1 |
| | | | | TOTALS | 24 | 9 | 33 |

=== Disciplinary record ===
| Number | Nation | Position | Name | Premier League | | Russian Cup | | Total | |
| Number | Nation | Position | Name | Yellow card | Red card | Yellow card | Red card | Yellow card | Red card |
| 4 | (Slovenia) | DF | Gregor Balažic | 3 | 1 | 0 | 0 | 3 | 1 |
| 6 | (Romania) | MF | Eric Bicfalvi | 4 | 1 | 0 | 0 | 4 | 1 |
| 7 | (Russia) | DF | Aleksandr Dantsev | 5 | 0 | 3 | 1 | 8 | 1 |
| 8 | (Russia) | MF | Aleksandr Pavlenko | 1 | 0 | 0 | 0 | 1 | 0 |
| 9 | (Russia) | FW | Roman Pavlyuchenko | 6 | 1 | 0 | 0 | 6 | 1 |
| 10 | (Zambia) | MF | Chisamba Lungu | 3 | 0 | 1 | 0 | 4 | 0 |
| 12 | (Russia) | MF | Aleksandr Novikov | 2 | 0 | 1 | 0 | 3 | 0 |
| 13 | (Serbia) | DF | Radovan Pankov | 1 | 0 | 0 | 0 | 1 | 0 |
| 15 | (Ukraine) | MF | Denys Kulakov | 2 | 0 | 2 | 0 | 4 | 0 |
| 18 | (Russia) | FW | Vladimir Ilyin | 2 | 0 | 1 | 0 | 3 | 0 |
| 25 | (Russia) | MF | Aleksandr Stavpets | 1 | 0 | 0 | 0 | 1 | 0 |
| 28 | (Russia) | GK | Nikolai Zabolotny | 1 | 0 | 0 | 0 | 1 | 0 |
| 29 | (Argentina) | DF | Pablo Fontanello | 2 | 0 | 0 | 0 | 2 | 0 |
| 39 | (Georgia (country)) | MF | Giorgi Chanturia | 1 | 0 | 0 | 0 | 1 | 0 |
| 53 | (Russia) | MF | Sergei Podoksyonov | 1 | 0 | 0 | 0 | 1 | 0 |
| 57 | (Russia) | MF | Artyom Fidler | 5 | 0 | 0 | 1 | 5 | 1 |
| 77 | (Russia) | MF | Dmitri Korobov | 1 | 0 | 0 | 0 | 1 | 0 |
| 90 | (Russia) | MF | Aleksandr Scherbakov | 1 | 0 | 0 | 0 | 1 | 0 |
| 92 | (Russia) | MF | Roman Yemelyanov | 6 | 1 | 0 | 0 | 6 | 1 |
| 99 | (Armenia) | FW | Edgar Manucharyan | 1 | 0 | 0 | 1 | 1 | 1 |
| | | | TOTALS | 48 | 4 | 8 | 3 | 56 | 7 |
