= 2013–14 FC Ural Sverdlovsk Oblast season =

Ural
2013–14 season
- Chairman: Grigori Ivanov
- Manager: Pavel Gusev until 1 August 2013; Oleg Vasilenko; 1 August – 27 November 2013; Alexander Tarkhanov from 27 November 2013
- Stadium: Central Stadium
- Premier League: 11th
- Russian Cup: Fifth round vs Tosno
- Top goalscorer: League: Spartak Gogniyev (9); All: Spartak Gogniyev (9)
Home colours	Away colours

The 2013–14 Ural season was the club's 1st season at the Russian Premier League, the highest tier of association football in Russia, since their relegation from the league in 1996. Ural finished the season in 11th place, whilst they were knocked out of the Russian Cup in the fifth round by Tosno.

Ural started the season under the management of Pavel Gusev, but he resigned on 1 August 2013, and replaced by Oleg Vasilenko. Vasilenko's contract was terminated by mutual consent on 27 November 2013, with Alexander Tarkhanov being appointed as the club's manager.

== Squad ==
Note: Flags indicate national team as defined under FIFA eligibility rules; some limited exceptions apply. Players may hold more than one non-FIFA nationality.

No.	Pos.	Nation	Player
2	DF	RUS	Vladimir Khozin
3	DF	ZAM	Chisamba Lungu
6	DF	ISL	Sölvi Ottesen
7	DF	RUS	Aleksandr Dantsev
9	FW	RUS	Spartak Gogniyev
11	MF	RUS	Aleksandr Shchanitsyn
12	DF	RUS	Aleksandr Novikov
13	DF	RUS	Denis Tumasyan
15	MF	RUS	Andrei Bochkov
16	FW	RUS	Arsen Goshokov
17	MF	RUS	Andrei Gorbanets
20	MF	BLR	Andrey Chukhley
21	MF	CHI	Gerson Acevedo

No.	Pos.	Nation	Player
25	FW	RUS	Aleksandr Stavpets
28	GK	RUS	Nikolay Zabolotnyi
33	GK	RUS	Igor Kot
34	FW	RUS	Denis Dorozhkin
41	MF	RUS	Aleksandr Sapeta (on loan from Dynamo Moscow)
57	MF	RUS	Artyom Fidler
63	DF	RUS	Aleksandr Belozyorov
65	DF	RUS	Alan Bagayev
77	MF	RUS	Kantemir Berkhamov
78	MF	HUN	Vladimir Koman (on loan from Krasnodar)
87	FW	ARM	Edgar Manucharyan
89	MF	RUS	Aleksandr Yerokhin (on loan from SKA-Energia)
99	MF	GEO	David Targamadze (on loan from Shakhtar)

== Transfers ==
=== Summer ===
In: Note: Flags indicate national team as defined under FIFA eligibility rules; some limited exceptions apply. Players may hold more than one non-FIFA nationality.

No.	Pos.	Nation	Player
1	GK	RUS	Aleksei Solosin (from (Russia) SKA-Energiya Khabarovsk)
6	DF	ISL	Sölvi Ottesen (from (Denmark) Copenhagen)
10	FW	RUS	Serder Serderov (loan from (Russia) Anzhi Makhachkala)
17	MF	RUS	Andrei Gorbanets (from (Russia) Tom Tomsk)
18	FW	ISR	Toto Tamuz (from (Israel) Hapoel Tel Aviv)
22	GK	RUS	Yevgeny Pomazan (loan from (Russia) Anzhi Makhachkala)
24	MF	RUS	Yuri Kirillov (from (Russia) Dynamo Moscow)
41	MF	RUS	Aleksandr Sapeta (on loan from (Russia) Dynamo Moscow)
63	DF	RUS	Aleksandr Belozyorov (from (Russia) Volga Nizhny Novgorod)
69	FW	ARM	Artur Sarkisov (from (Russia) Lokomotiv Moscow)
78	MF	HUN	Vladimir Koman (on loan from (Russia) FC Krasnodar)
89	MF	RUS	Aleksandr Yerokhin (on loan from (Russia) SKA-Energiya Khabarovsk)
—	GK	RUS	Grigori Lyubimov (end of loan to (Russia) Oktan Perm)
—	DF	RUS	Vyacheslav Bluzhin (end of loan to (Russia) Oktan Perm)
—	MF	GEO	Lasha Gvalia (from (Georgia (country)) Dila Gori)

Out: Note: Flags indicate national team as defined under FIFA eligibility rules; some limited exceptions apply. Players may hold more than one non-FIFA nationality.

No.	Pos.	Nation	Player
1	GK	RUS	Aleksandr Kotlyarov (to (Russia) Luch-Energiya Vladivostok)
3	MF	RUS	Ivan Melnik (on loan to (Russia) Dynamo St. Petersburg)
6	DF	RUS	Ivan Drannikov (to (Russia) Neftekhimik Nizhnekamsk)
10	FW	RUS	Serder Serderov (loan return to (Russia) Anzhi Makhachkala)
18	MF	SRB	Branimir Petrović (to (Belgium) Kortrijk)
22	FW	RUS	Anton Kobyalko (to (Russia) Gazovik Orenburg)
22	GK	RUS	Yevgeny Pomazan (loan return to (Russia) Anzhi Makhachkala)
24	MF	BLR	Artsyom Salavey (released)
25	DF	RUS	Aleksei Revyakin (to (Russia) Fakel Voronezh)
28	MF	RUS	Maksim Astafyev (end of loan from (Russia) Sibir Novosibirsk)
36	MF	RUS	Konstantin Skrylnikov (to (Russia) Fakel Voronezh)
37	FW	RUS	Dmitri Ryzhov (to (Russia) Yenisey Krasnoyarsk)
58	DF	RUS	Adessoye Oyewole (on loan to (Russia) Gazovik Orenburg)
61	FW	RUS	Mikhail Biryukov (to (Russia) SKVO Rostov-on-Don)
81	GK	RUS	Dmitri Yashin (to (Russia) Shinnik Yaroslavl)
88	FW	RUS	Aleksandr Marenich (to (Russia) Spartak-2 Moscow)
90	FW	RUS	Yevgeny Savin (to (Russia) Arsenal Tula)
—	MF	RUS	Maksim Volkov (to (Russia) Fakel Voronezh, previously on loan to (Russia) Baltika Kaliningrad)

=== Winter ===
In: Note: Flags indicate national team as defined under FIFA eligibility rules; some limited exceptions apply. Players may hold more than one non-FIFA nationality.

No.	Pos.	Nation	Player
2	DF	RUS	Vladimir Khozin (from (Russia) Alania Vladikavkaz)
25	FW	RUS	Aleksandr Stavpets (from (Russia) Rotor Volgograd)
28	GK	RUS	Nikolai Zabolotny (from (Russia) Spartak Moscow)
34	FW	RUS	Denis Dorozhkin (from (Russia) Luch-Energiya Vladivostok)
57	MF	RUS	Artyom Fidler (from (Russia) Kuban Krasnodar)
63	DF	RUS	Alan Bagayev (from (Russia) Alania-d Vladikavkaz)
99	MF	GEO	David Targamadze (loan from (Ukraine) Shakhtar Donetsk)

Out: Note: Flags indicate national team as defined under FIFA eligibility rules; some limited exceptions apply. Players may hold more than one non-FIFA nationality.

No.	Pos.	Nation	Player
1	GK	RUS	Aleksei Solosin (to (Russia) Khimki)
5	DF	SRB	Milan Vještica (to (Russia) Dynamo Saint Petersburg)
8	MF	RUS	Anatoli Gerk (to (Russia) Tambov)
18	FW	ISR	Toto Tamuz (to (Romania) Petrolul Ploiești)
23	MF	RUS	Yuri Kirillov
69	FW	ARM	Artur Sarkisov (to (Russia) Volga Nizhny Novgorod)
70	MF	RUS	Nikolai Safronidi (to (Russia) Ufa)

== Competitions ==
=== Russian Premier League ===
==== Results by round ====
Round	1	2	3	4	5	6	7	8	9	10	11	12	13	14	15	16	17	18	19	20	21	22	23	24	25	26	27	28	29	30
Ground	H	H	H	A	H	A	H	H	A	H	A	H	A	H	A	H	H	A	A	A	H	A	H	A	A	A	H	A	H	A
Result	D	L	L	W	D	L	L	L	D	L	D	L	D	L	W	L	D	L	L	W	W	L	W	W	L	W	D	L	W	W
Position	9	14	15	12	12	13	13	13	13	14	14	15	14	15	13	14	14	14	15	15	13	15	12	12	12	13	11	12	12	11

Updated to match(es) played on 18 June 2014. Source: Russian Premier League
A = Away; H = Home; W = Win; D = Draw; L = Loss

==== Matches ====
17 July 2013 1	Ural	2–2	CSKA Moscow	Yekaterinburg
19:30 YET (UTC+6)	Gogniyev 48', 78'	Summary	Musa 24'; Vágner Love 86'	Stadium: Central Stadium; Attendance: 25,200; Referee: Igor Nizovtsev

21 July 2013 2	Ural	0–2	Spartak Moscow	Yekaterinburg
18:00 YET (UTC+6)		Summary	McGeady 51'; Emenike 90'	Stadium: Central Stadium; Attendance: 26,000; Referee: Sergey Lapochkin

27 July 2013 3	Ural	1–2	Volga	Yekaterinburg
18:30 YET (UTC+6)	Gogniyev 19' (pen.)	Summary	Polczak 58'; Karyaka 80' (pen.)	Stadium: Central Stadium; Attendance: 13,500; Referee: Vyacheslav Kharlamov

3 August 2013 4	Tom Tomsk	1–2	Ural	Tomsk
19:20 YET (UTC+6)	Portnyagin 19' (pen.)	Summary	Tumasyan 2'; Sarkisov 25'	Stadium: Trud Stadium; Attendance: 4,200; Referee: Timur Arslanbekov

17 August 2013 5	Ural	0–0	Amkar Perm	Central Stadium
15:30 YET (UTC+6)		Summary		Stadium: Yekaterinburg; Attendance: 21,323; Referee: Sergey Kostevich

25 August 2013 6	Kuban Krasnodar	3–2	Ural	Krasnodar
22:00 YET (UTC+6)	Khubulov 8'; Cissé 27' (pen.), 43'	Summary	Yerokhin 13'; Acevedo 35' (pen.)	Stadium: Kuban Stadium; Attendance: 12,437; Referee: Maxim Layushkin

1 September 2013 7	Ural	0–3	Rubin Kazan'	Yekaterinburg
15:30 YET (UTC+6)		Summary	Rondón 17', 55', 75'	Stadium: Central Stadium; Attendance: 17,000; Referee: Vladimir Kazmenko

16 September 2013 8	Ural	1–4	Dynamo Moscow	Yekaterinburg
19:00 YET (UTC+6)	Acevedo (red card) 42'; Gogniyev 87'	Summary	Kokorin 7'; Voronin 18', 35', 45' (pen.)	Stadium: Central Stadium; Attendance: 13,200; Referee: Vitali Meshkov

21 September 2013 9	Krylia Sovetov	1–1	Ural	Samara, Russia
18:00 YET (UTC+6)	Amisulashvili 19'	Summary	Gogniyev 11'	Stadium: Metallurg Stadium; Attendance: 10,236; Referee: Sergey Kuznetsov

25 September 2013 10	Ural	0–3	Lokomotiv Moscow	Yekaterinburg
20:15 YET (UTC+6)	Vještica (red card) 12'	Report	5' N'Doye; 26' Tarasov; 90+1' Diarra	Stadium: Central Stadium; Attendance: 11,240; Referee: Mikhail Vilkov

30 September 2013 11	Rostov	1–1	Ural	Rostov-on-Don
22:30 YET (UTC+6)	Dzyuba 25'	Summary	Belozyorov 62'	Stadium: Olimp – 2 Attendance: 8,500; Referee: Aleksei Matyunin

5 October 2013 12	Ural	0–2	Krasnodar	Yekaterinburg
15:30 YET (UTC+6)		Summary	Joãozinho 50'; Pereyra 63'	Stadium: Central Stadium; Attendance: 8,000; Referee: Maxim Layushkin

19 October 2013 13	Terek Grozny	1–1	Ural	Grozny
16:30 YET (UTC+6)	Maurício 25'	Summary	Acevedo 67' (pen.)	Stadium: Terek Stadium; Attendance: 14,720; Referee: Vladislav Bezborodov

26 October 2013 14	Ural	1–2	Zenit St. Petersburg	Yekaterinburg
20:00 YET (UTC+6)	Gogniyev 42'	Summary	Shirokov 54', 79'	Stadium: Central Stadium; Attendance: 23,150; Referee: Igor Nizovtsev

3 November 2013 15	Anzhi Makhachkala	0–1	Ural	Kaspiysk
22:15 YET (UTC+6)		Summary	Acevedo 90+3'	Stadium: Anzhi-Arena; Attendance: 8,000; Referee: Vasiliy Kazartsev

8 November 2013 16	Ural	1–4	Rostov	Yekaterinburg
19:00 YET (UTC+6)	Acevedo (red card) 38'; Gogniyev 88'	Summary	Dzyuba 5', 47'; Logashov 11'; Kanga 62'	Stadium: Central Stadium; Attendance: 6,090; Referee: Sergey Kuznetsov

24 November 2013 17	Ural	1–1	Krylia Sovetov	Yekaterinburg
18:00 YET (UTC+6)	Tumasyan 39'; Yerokhin (red card) 48'	Summary	Caballero 90'	Stadium: Central Stadium; Attendance: 5,100; Referee: Mikhail Vilkov

30 November 2013 18	Dynamo Moscow	3–0	Ural	Moscow
16:00 YET (UTC+6)	Granat 28'; Kurányi 58'; Kokorin 70'	Summary		Stadium: Arena Khimki; Attendance: 3,900; Referee: Vitali Meshkov

6 December 2013 19	Zenit St. Petersburg	2–1	Ural	Saint Petersburg
22:00 YET (UTC+6)	Hulk 12'; Lombaerts 75'	Summary	Gogniyev 55'	Stadium: Petrovsky Stadium; Attendance: 16,775; Referee: Timur Arslanbekov

8 March 2013 20	Krasnodar	0–1	Ural	Yekaterinburg
18:30 YET (UTC+6)		Summary	Acevedo 19'	Stadium: Central Stadium; Attendance: 8,300; Referee: Sergey Lapochkin

14 March 2014 21	Ural	2–1	Terek Grozny	Central Stadium
19:00 YET (UTC+6)	Manucharyan 88', 90+3'	Summary	Kudryashov (red card) 11'; Maurício 90+1'	Stadium: Yekaterinburg; Attendance: 2,680; Referee: Aleksey Eskov

22 March 2014 22	Lokomotiv Moscow	3–0	Ural	Moscow
18:30 YET (UTC+6)	Belozyorov (og) 13'; N'Doye 14'; Tkachyov 76'	Report		Stadium: Lokomotiv Stadium; Attendance: 9,508; Referee: Aleksandr Yegorov

29 March 2014 23	Ural	0–2	Anzhi Makhachkala	Yekaterinburg
15:30 YET (UTC+6)	Gogniyev 10'; Yerokhin 40'	Summary	Epureanu 85'	Stadium: Central Stadium; Attendance: 2,830; Referee: Alexy Nikolaev

4 April 2014 24	Spartak Moscow	0–1	Ural	Moscow
22:30 YET (UTC+6)		Summary	Khozin 20'	Stadium: Lokomotiv Stadium; Attendance: 9,850; Referee: Vitali Meshkov

12 April 2014 25	CSKA Moscow	1–0	Ural	Moscow
16:30 YET (UTC+6)	Musa 17'	Summary		Stadium: Arena Khimki; Attendance: 7,000; Referee: Vladislav Bezborodov

18 April 2014 26	Amkar Perm	0–2	Ural	Perm
19:00 YET (UTC+6)		Summary	Manucharyan 67'; Khozin 83'	Stadium: Zvezda Stadium; Attendance: 8,300; Referee: Sergey Ivanov

26 April 2014 27	Ural	0–0	Tom Tomsk	Yekaterinburg
17:00 YET (UTC+6)		Summary		Stadium: Central Stadium; Attendance: 8,100; Referee: Vitali Meshkov

4 May 2014 28	Rubin Kazan'	1–0	Ural	Kazan
18:30 YET (UTC+6)	Navas 39'	Summary		Stadium: Central Stadium; Attendance: 3,957; Referee: Igor Fedotov

10 May 2014 29	Ural	2–1	Kuban Krasnodar	Yekaterinburg
15:00 YET (UTC+6)	Acevedo 27' (pen.); Dorozhkin 84'	Summary	Ignatyev 18'	Stadium: Central Stadium; Attendance: 14,420; Referee: Aleksey Eskov

15 May 2014 30	Volga	1–2	Ural	Nizhny Novgorod
20:30 YET (UTC+6)	Sarkisov 81'	Summary	Koman 45+1' (pen.); Sapeta 74'	Stadium: Lokomotiv Stadium; Attendance: 1,950; Referee: Sergey Karasev

==== League table ====
Pos	Team	Pld	W	D	L	GF	GA	GD	Pts	Qualification or relegation
9	Rubin Kazan	30	9	11	10	36	30	+6	38 (Note: Rubin Kazan ahead of Amkar Perm on head-to-head points; Rubin Kazan–Amkar Perm 3–0, Amkar Perm–Rubin Kazan 0–0.)	
10	Amkar Perm	30	9	11	10	36	37	−1	38	
11	Ural Sverdlovsk Oblast	30	9	7	14	28	46	−18	34	
12	Terek Grozny	30	8	9	13	27	33	−6	33	
13	Tom Tomsk (R)	30	8	7	15	23	39	−16	31	Qualification for the Relegation play-offs

Source: Russian Premier League
Rules for classification: 1) points; 2) number of wins; 3) head-to-head points; 4) number of head-to-head wins; 5) head-to-head goal difference; 6) number of head-to-head goals scored; 7) number of head-to-head away goals scored; 8) goal difference; 9) number of goals scored; 10) number of away goals scored; 11) position in the 2012–13 season (only used until all the regularly scheduled games have been played); 11) extra play-off game or tournament between the teams in question.
(R) Relegated

=== Russian Cup ===
30 October 2013 Fifth round	Tosno	0–0 (a.e.t.) (5–3 p)	Ural	Tosno
16:30 YET (UTC+6)		Summary		Stadium: Kirovets Stadium; Attendance: 3,600; Referee: Vitaly Rushakov
	Penalties
	Anton Proshin (penalty scored); Zemlyanskiy (penalty scored); Chernukhin (penalty scored); Petukhov (penalty scored); Savin (penalty scored)		Tumasyan (penalty scored); Acevedo (penalty missed); Safronidi (penalty scored); Koman (penalty scored)

== Squad statistics ==
=== Appearances and goals ===
No.	Pos	Nat	Player	Total		Premier League		Russian Cup	
No.	Pos	Nat	Player	Apps	Goals	Apps	Goals	Apps	Goals
2	DF	(Russia) RUS	Vladimir Khozin	11	2	11	2	0	0
3	MF	(Zambia) ZAM	Chisamba Lungu	23	0	18+4	0	1	0
6	DF	(Iceland) ISL	Sölvi Ottesen	18	0	18	0	0	0
7	DF	(Russia) RUS	Aleksandr Dantsev	23	0	21+1	0	1	0
9	FW	(Russia) RUS	Spartak Gogniyev	26	9	25+1	9	0	0
11	MF	(Russia) RUS	Aleksandr Shchanitsyn	17	0	9+7	0	1	0
12	DF	(Russia) RUS	Aleksandr Novikov	15	0	13+2	0	0	0
13	DF	(Russia) RUS	Denis Tumasyan	15	2	12+2	2	1	0
15	MF	(Russia) RUS	Andrei Bochkov	13	0	11+2	0	0	0
17	MF	(Russia) RUS	Andrei Gorbanets	15	0	13+1	0	1	0
20	MF	(Belarus) BLR	Andrey Chukhley	8	0	8	0	0	0
21	MF	(Chile) CHI	Gerson Acevedo	21	5	19+1	5	1	0
24	MF	(Russia) RUS	Yuri Kirillov	6	0	3+2	0	1	0
25	FW	(Russia) RUS	Aleksandr Stavpets	7	0	0+7	0	0	0
27	FW	(Russia) RUS	Aleksandr Sobolev	2	0	0+1	0	0+1	0
28	GK	(Russia) RUS	Nikolai Zabolotny	11	0	11	0	0	0
33	GK	(Russia) RUS	Igor Kot	7	0	6+1	0	0	0
34	FW	(Russia) RUS	Denis Dorozhkin	6	1	1+5	1	0	0
41	MF	(Russia) RUS	Aleksandr Sapeta	6	1	4+2	1	0	0
57	MF	(Russia) RUS	Artyom Fidler	9	0	9	0	0	0
63	DF	(Russia) RUS	Aleksandr Belozyorov	19	1	18+1	1	0	0
77	MF	(Russia) RUS	Kantemir Berkhamov	12	0	10+2	0	0	0
78	MF	(Hungary) HUN	Vladimir Koman	18	1	11+6	1	0+1	0
87	FW	(Armenia) ARM	Edgar Manucharyan	23	3	13+10	3	0	0
89	MF	(Russia) RUS	Aleksandr Yerokhin	26	2	22+3	2	1	0
Players away from the club on loan:
58	MF	(Russia) RUS	Adessoye Oyewole	1	0	0+1	0	0	0
Players who appeared for Ural no longer at the club:
1	GK	(Russia) RUS	Aleksei Solosin	10	0	7+2	0	1	0
5	DF	(Serbia) SRB	Milan Vještica	14	0	12+1	0	1	0
10	FW	(Russia) RUS	Serder Serderov	4	0	2+2	0	0	0
18	FW	(Israel) ISR	Toto Tamuz	7	0	2+5	0	0	0
22	GK	(Russia) RUS	Yevgeny Pomazan	6	0	6	0	0	0
69	FW	(Armenia) ARM	Artur Sarkisov	13	1	8+5	1	0	0
70	MF	(Russia) RUS	Nikolai Safronidi	12	0	7+4	0	1	0

=== Top scorers ===
Place	Position	Nation	Number	Name	Russian Premier League	Russian Cup	Total
1	FW	(Russia)	9	Spartak Gogniyev	9	0	9
2	MF	(Chile)	21	Gerson Acevedo	5	0	5
3	FW	(Armenia)	87	Edgar Manucharyan	3	0	3
4	DF	(Russia)	13	Denis Tumasyan	2	0	2
4	MF	(Russia)	89	Aleksandr Yerokhin	2	0	2
4	DF	(Russia)	2	Vladimir Khozin	2	0	2
7	FW	(Armenia)	69	Artur Sarkisov	1	0	1
7	DF	(Russia)	63	Aleksandr Belozyorov	1	0	1
7	FW	(Russia)	34	Denis Dorozhkin	1	0	1
7	MF	(Hungary)	78	Vladimir Koman	1	0	1
7	MF	(Russia)	41	Aleksandr Sapeta	1	0	1
				TOTALS	28	0	28

=== Disciplinary record ===
Number	Nation	Position	Name	Russian Premier League		Russian Cup		Total	
Number	Nation	Position	Name	Yellow card	Red card	Yellow card	Red card	Yellow card	Red card
1	(Russia)	GK	Aleksei Solosin	2	0	0	0	2	0
2	(Russia)	DF	Vladimir Khozin	1	0	0	0	1	0
3	(Zambia)	FW	Chisamba Lungu	2	0	0	0	2	0
5	(Serbia)	DF	Milan Vještica	2	1	1	0	3	1
6	(Iceland)	DF	Sölvi Ottesen	7	0	0	0	7	0
7	(Russia)	DF	Aleksandr Dantsev	3	0	0	0	3	0
9	(Russia)	FW	Spartak Gogniyev	3	0	0	0	3	0
11	(Russia)	MF	Aleksandr Shchanitsyn	1	0	0	0	1	0
12	(Russia)	DF	Aleksandr Novikov	1	0	0	0	1	0
13	(Russia)	DF	Denis Tumasyan	4	0	0	0	4	0
17	(Russia)	MF	Andrei Gorbanets	3	0	0	0	3	0
21	(Chile)	MF	Gerson Acevedo	5	2	0	0	5	2
41	(Russia)	MF	Aleksandr Sapeta	1	0	0	0	1	0
57	(Russia)	MF	Artyom Fidler	2	0	0	0	2	0
63	(Russia)	DF	Aleksandr Belozyorov	5	1	0	0	5	1
69	(Armenia)	FW	Artur Sarkisov	1	0	0	0	1	0
70	(Russia)	MF	Nikolai Safronidi	2	0	1	0	3	0
77	(Russia)	MF	Kantemir Berkhamov	2	0	0	0	2	0
78	(Hungary)	MF	Vladimir Koman	1	0	1	0	2	0
87	(Armenia)	FW	Edgar Manucharyan	2	0	0	0	2	0
89	(Russia)	MF	Aleksandr Yerokhin	3	1	0	0	3	1
			TOTALS	53	5	3	0	56	5
