= Vladimir Ilyin (footballer, born 1992) =

Russian footballer

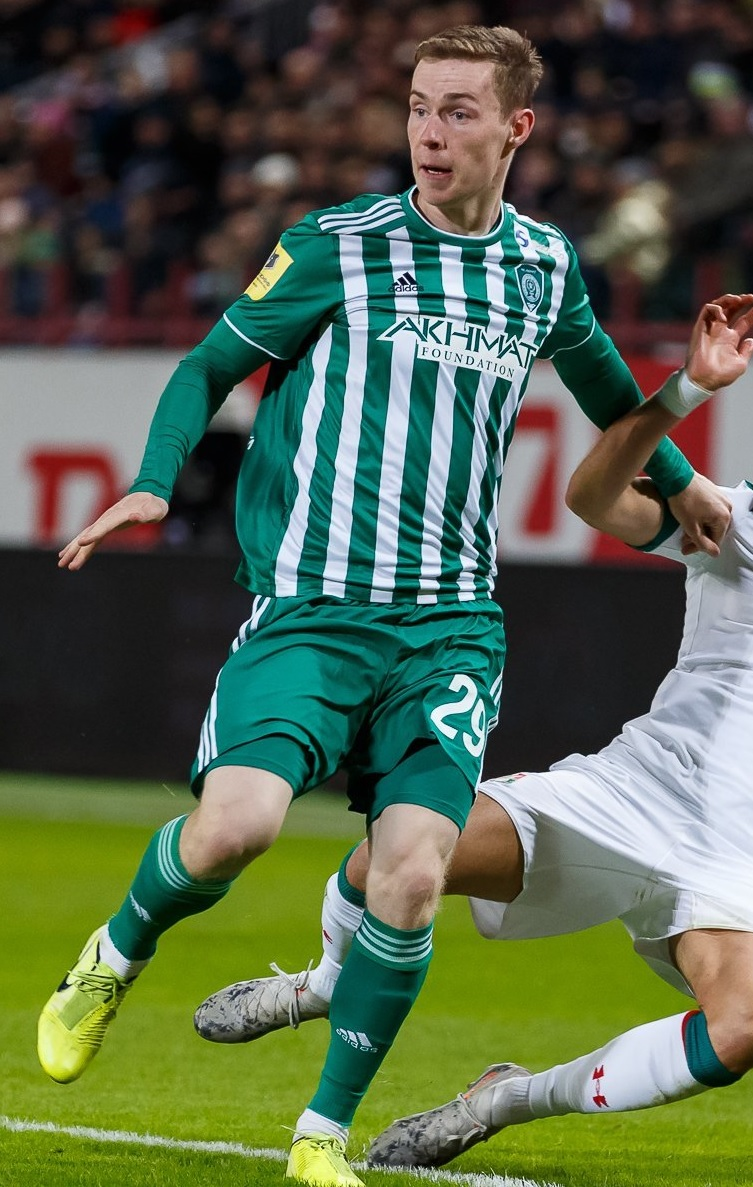
- Ilyin with Akhmat Grozny in 2020

Personal information
- Full name: Vladimir Dmitriyevich Ilyin
- Date of birth: 20 May 1992 (age 34)
- Place of birth: St. Petersburg, Russia
- Height: 1.88 m (6 ft 2 in)
- Position: Centre forward

Youth career
- –2006: Zenit St. Petersburg
- 2006–2008: Izhorets Kolpino
- 2010–2011: Admiralteyets St. Petersburg

Senior career*
Years	Team	Apps	(Gls)
2011	Rus St. Petersburg (amateur)		
2012–2013	Piter St. Petersburg	22	(4)
2013	Dynamo St. Petersburg	15	(1)
2014–2016	Tosno	34	(14)
2014	→ Kaluga (loan)	5	(4)
2014–2015	→ Khimik Dzerzhinsk (loan)	25	(1)
2016	Kuban Krasnodar	24	(2)
2017–2019	Ural Yekaterinburg	75	(13)
2020–2021	Akhmat Grozny	36	(11)
2021–2022	Krasnodar	22	(4)
2022–2024	Akhmat Grozny	47	(6)
2024–2025	Fakel Voronezh	25	(3)
2025–2026	Sochi	11	(2)
- * Club domestic league appearances and goals as of 3 May 2026

Vladimir Dmitriyevich Ilyin (Russian: Владимир Дмитриевич Ильин; born 20 May 1992) is a Russian professional footballer who plays as a centre forward.

== Club career ==
Ilyin made his debut in the Russian Second Division for Piter St. Petersburg on 23 July 2012 in a game against Dnepr Smolensk.

On 7 January 2020, he signed a 3.5-year contract with Akhmat Grozny.

On 11 June 2021, Ilyin moved to Krasnodar on a 3-year contract. On 22 June 2022, his contract with Krasnodar was terminated by mutual consent. On the next day Ilyin returned to Akhmat Grozny on a two-year contract.

On 29 May 2024, Ilyin left Akhmat as his contract expired.

On 21 June 2024, Ilyin signed with Fakel Voronezh.

On 27 September 2025, he joined Sochi for the 2025–26 season.

== Career statistics ==
=== Club ===
As of match played 3 May 2026

Appearances and goals by club, season and competition
Club	Season	League			Cup		Other		Total	
Club	Season	Division	Apps	Goals	Apps	Goals	Apps	Goals	Apps	Goals
Piter St. Petersburg	2012–13	Russian Second League	22	4	2	1	—		24	5
Dynamo St. Petersburg	2013–14	Russian First League	15	1	1	0	—		16	1
Kaluga (loan)	2013–14	Russian Second League	5	4	—		—		5	4
Tosno	2014–15	Russian First League	2	0	—		—		2	0
Tosno	2015–16	Russian First League	32	14	2	0	—		34	14
Tosno	Total		34	14	2	0	—		36	14
Khimik Dzerzhinsk (loan)	2014–15	Russian First League	25	1	2	0	—		27	1
Kuban Krasnodar	2016–17	Russian First League	24	2	0	0	—		24	2
Ural Yekaterinburg	2016–17	Russian Premier League	12	4	3	2	—		15	6
Ural Yekaterinburg	2017–18	Russian Premier League	25	4	0	0	4 (Note: Appearances in the FNL Cup)	0	29	4
Ural Yekaterinburg	2018–19	Russian Premier League	20	1	6	1	1	0	27	2
Ural Yekaterinburg	2019–20	Russian Premier League	18	4	2	0	—		20	4
Ural Yekaterinburg	Total		75	13	11	3	5	0	91	16
Akhmat Grozny	2019–20	Russian Premier League	8	2	1	0	—		9	2
Akhmat Grozny	2020–21	Russian Premier League	28	9	3	0	—		31	9
Akhmat Grozny	Total		36	11	4	0	—		40	11
Krasnodar	2021–22	Russian Premier League	22	4	2	0	—		24	4
Akhmat Grozny	2022–23	Russian Premier League	27	4	7	2	—		34	6
Akhmat Grozny	2023–24	Russian Premier League	20	2	8	3	—		28	5
Akhmat Grozny	Total		47	6	15	5	0	0	62	11
Fakel Voronezh	2024–25	Russian Premier League	25	3	3	1	—		28	4
Sochi	2025–26	Russian Premier League	11	2	1	0	—		12	2
Career total			341	65	43	10	5	0	389	75
