= Edgar Manucharyan =

Armenian footballer

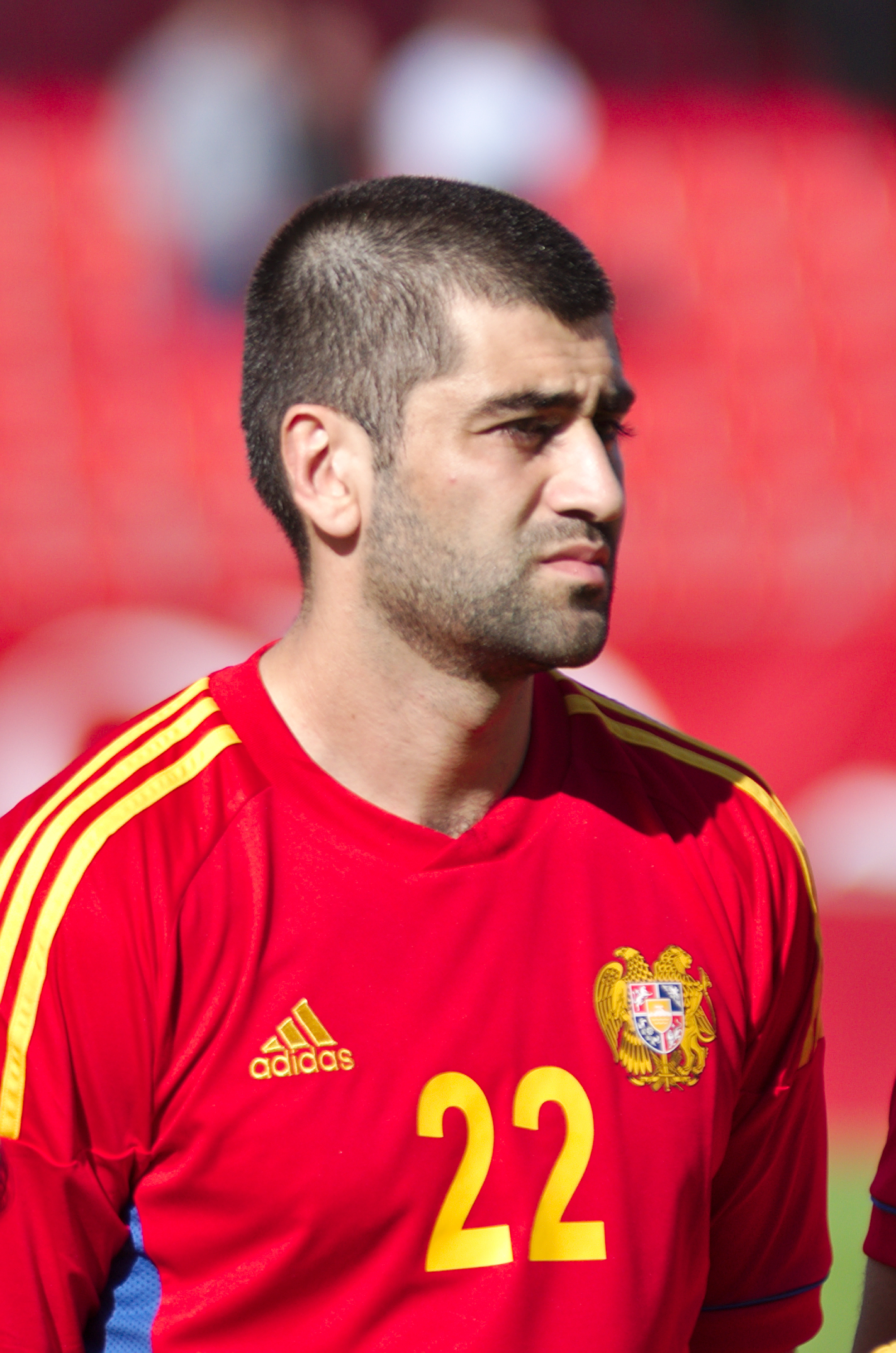
- Manucharyan with Armenia in 2014

Personal information
- Date of birth: 19 January 1987 (age 39)
- Place of birth: Yerevan, Armenian SSR, Soviet Union
- Height: 1.77 m (5 ft 10 in)
- Positions: Forward; winger

Senior career*
| Years | Team | Apps | (Gls) |
| 2002–2005 | Pyunik | 53 | (40) |
| 2005–2010 | Ajax | 9 | (0) |
| 2009–2010 | → Haarlem (loan) | 17 | (6) |
| 2010 | → AGOVV Apeldoorn (loan) | 12 | (8) |
| 2010–2011 | Pyunik | 28 | (13) |
| 2011–2012 | → Ural Yekaterinburg (loan) | 12 | (6) |
| 2012–2017 | Ural Yekaterinburg | 98 | (25) |
| 2017 | Ratchaburi | 0 | (0) |
| 2018 | Ural Yekaterinburg | 6 | (0) |
| 2018–2019 | Alashkert | 21 | (3) |
| 2019 | Pyunik | 3 | (0) |
| 2020 | Alashkert | 5 | (0) |
| Total | | 264 | (101) |

International career^{‡}
| 2002–2004 | Armenia U17 | 9 | (8) |
| 2003–2004 | Armenia U19 | 18 | (15) |
| 2002–2008 | Armenia U21 | 7 | (1) |
| 2004–2017 | Armenia | 54 | (9) |
- * Club domestic league appearances and goals ‡ National team caps and goals as of 5 October 2017

Edgar Manucharyan (Armenian: Էդգար Մանուչարյան; born 19 January 1987) is an Armenian former professional footballer who played as a forward.

== Club career ==
=== Ajax ===
In early December 2004, Manucharyan joined Ajax Amsterdam. On 14 December, he took part in a friendly game against the Spanish club Barcelona playing 14 minutes before suffering a foot injury. As was later revealed in a medical examination, Manucharyan had broken the metatarsal bones in his right leg. The same day the Football Federation of Armenia named Manucharyan best player of Armenia in 2004 in a survey conducted among journalists. After the injury, Ajax did not immediately sign a contract with Manucharyan but in July 2005, he joined on a three-year contract with Ajax paying Pyunik a $100,000 fee.

Manucharyan scored his first goal for Ajax in an 18–0 pre-season win over a Dutch amateur side. Manucharyan made his Ajax and his Eredivisie debut on 18 September 2005 in a 4–2 defeat to AZ Alkmaar coming off the bench in the 84th minute in place of striker Ryan Babel In the 2005–06 season, he played a total of four matches in the championship and won the KNVB Cup. He also participated in the Amsterdam Tournament of 2006 coming on as a substitute against Inter Milan and featuring in the starting line-up against Manchester United. After the match, both Olympique Lyonnais and S.L. Benfica showed interest in the player. However, on 16 March 2007 his running contract until 2008 was extended until 30 June 2011.

In the 2006–07 season, Manucharyan rarely got into the first team squad and was frequently injured. He mostly played for the youth team, Jong Ajax. On 2 November 2006, Manucharyan scored his first official goal for Ajax in a 3–0 win over Austrian club FK Austria Wien during the 2006–07 UEFA Cup season. Having come on as a substitute in the 57th minute, he scored 8 minutes later. On 22 July 2006, Manucharyan took part in a friendly match against English club Arsenal F.C., which was held at the new Emirates Stadium. The match was the farewell game for Dennis Bergkamp, former player of Ajax and Arsenal. Manucharyan made an assist to Klaas-Jan Huntelaar, who scored the first ever goal at the new Emirates Stadium. In early March 2007, he extended his contract until 2011, and in May he won his second KNVB Cup.

In the 2007–08 season, Manucharyan did not feature in a single game for the first team under new coach Adrie Koster, despite being in excellent form, and constantly played for the youth team, while being affected by minor injuries. In May 2008, Manucharyan expressed his desire to leave the team. In June 2008, Manucharyan and five other Ajax players were declared surplus to requirements.

=== Haarlem and Apeldoorn ===
On 6 August 2009, Manucharyan went on loan to Dutch first division club Haarlem. The lease term was calculated for one year. The next day, on 7 August, he made his debut for the team in the first division match against SC Veendam. Replacing defender Franck Karremana, Manucharyan came off the bench in the 58th minute while Haarlem eventually lost 1–6 at home. Manucharyan scored his first goal for the club on 26 September 2009 against FC Den Bosch. For the next six months spent in the Eredivisie championship, he played 17 matches and scored 6 goals for Haarlem. On 25 January 2010, Haarlem declared bankruptcy. The club was unable to find an investor who would be willing to take on the debts of the club. As one of six Ajax players who joined Haarlem on loan, Manucharyan briefly returned to Ajax. A few days later, on 3 February, Edgar went on loan to AGOVV Apeldoorn, coached by former Ajax player John van den Brom. Manucharyan's first game for the club was marked by a goal, contributing to his team's 0–1 win in the away league match against FC Volendam. A week later, on 19 February, he scored a hat-trick in a game against SBV Excelsior.

=== Return to Pyunik ===
In July 2010, at the end of the 2009–10 season, Manucharyan and Ajax agreed over the termination of his contract valid until the summer of 2011. After becoming a free agent, he joined his former club Pyunik Yerevan signing a six-month contract. He made his debut in the second leg of the 2010–11 Champions League second qualifying round tie with Partizan Belgrade. Pyunik lost the match 1–0 at home, sealing a 4–1 aggregate win for Partizan. Domestically, Manucharyan contributed five goals in the 2010 Armenian Premier League as Pyunik won the national league with just a point advantage over Banants. After the end of his contract, Manucharyan became a free agent and with Ukrainian club FC Karpaty Lviv showing interest in signing him. He was due to fly to the city, but the signing did not happen and Manucharyan instead left for Pyunik's training camp in Sochi before signing a three-year contract with the club.

In mid-August 2011, he was loaned to Ural Sverdlovsk Oblast on a one-year lease. Manucharyan played just five games scoring three goals and providing one assist.

=== Ural Sverdlovsk Oblast ===
On 17 July 2012, Manucharyan signed a two-year contract with Ural Sverdlovsk Oblast. On 1 April 2013, he scored his first two goals in his seventh match for the club, a 2–0 defeat of Tom Tomsk.

He left Ural after his contract expired at the end of the 2017–18 season.

=== Alashkert ===
On 25 July 2018, Manucharyan signed for Alashkert, being released by Alashkert at the end of the 2018–19 season on 5 June 2019.

=== Pyunik ===
On 6 June 2019, FC Pyunik announced the return of Manucharyan. Manucharyan left Pyunik on 24 December 2019 after playing just four games and scoring once.

=== Alashkert ===
On 4 March 2020, FC Alashkert announced the return of Manucharyan. On 2 August 2020, Manucharyan announced his retirement from football.

== Career statistics ==
=== Club ===
Appearances and goals by club, season and competition
| Club | Season | League | | | National cup | | Continental | | Other | | Total | |
| Club | Season | Division | Apps | Goals | Apps | Goals | Apps | Goals | Apps | Goals | Apps | Goals |
|---|---|---|---|---|---|---|---|---|---|---|---|---|
| Pyunik | 2002 | Armenian Premier League | 10 | 2 | | | 0 | 0 | — | | 10 | 2 |
| Pyunik | 2003 | Armenian Premier League | 17 | 12 | | | 4 | 0 | — | | 21 | 12 |
| Pyunik | 2004 | Armenian Premier League | 22 | 21 | | | 4 | 2 | — | | 26 | 23 |
| Pyunik | 2005 | Armenian Premier League | 4 | 5 | | | 0 | 0 | — | | 4 | 5 |
| Pyunik | Total | | 53 | 40 | | | 8 | 2 | - | - | 61 | 42 |
| Ajax | 2005–06 | Eredivisie | 4 | 0 | 0 | 0 | 1 | 0 | — | | 5 | 0 |
| Ajax | 2006–07 | Eredivisie | 5 | 0 | 1 | 0 | 2 | 1 | — | | 8 | 1 |
| Ajax | 2007–08 | Eredivisie | 0 | 0 | 0 | 0 | 0 | 0 | — | | 0 | 0 |
| Ajax | 2008–09 | Eredivisie | 0 | 0 | 0 | 0 | 0 | 0 | — | | 0 | 0 |
| Ajax | 2009–10 | Eredivisie | 0 | 0 | 0 | 0 | 0 | 0 | — | | 0 | 0 |
| Ajax | Total | | 9 | 0 | 1 | 0 | 3 | 1 | - | - | 13 | 1 |
| Haarlem (loan) | 2009–10 | Eerste Divisie | 17 | 6 | 1 | 0 | — | | — | | 18 | 6 |
| AGOVV (loan) | 2009–10 | Eerste Divisie | 10 | 7 | 0 | 0 | — | | 2 | 1 | 12 | 8 |
| Pyunik | 2010 | Armenian Premier League | 12 | 5 | 0 | 0 | 1 | 0 | — | | 13 | 5 |
| Pyunik | 2011 | Armenian Premier League | 16 | 8 | 2 | 0 | 1 | 0 | — | | 19 | 8 |
| Pyunik | 2012–13 | Armenian Premier League | 0 | 0 | 0 | 0 | 0 | 0 | — | | 0 | 0 |
| Pyunik | Total | | 28 | 13 | 2 | 0 | 2 | 0 | - | - | 32 | 13 |
| Ural Yekaterinburg (loan) | 2011–12 | Russian Premier League | 12 | 6 | 0 | 0 | — | | — | | 6 | 0 |
| Ural Yekaterinburg | 2012–13 | Russian Premier League | 11 | 6 | 0 | 0 | — | | — | | 6 | 0 |
| Ural Yekaterinburg | 2013–14 | Russian Premier League | 23 | 3 | 0 | 0 | — | | — | | 23 | 3 |
| Ural Yekaterinburg | 2014–15 | Russian Premier League | 18 | 2 | 1 | 1 | — | | 0 | 0 | 18 | 2 |
| Ural Yekaterinburg | 2015–16 | Russian Premier League | 22 | 6 | 1 | 0 | — | | — | | 23 | 6 |
| Ural Yekaterinburg | 2016–17 | Russian Premier League | 12 | 2 | 3 | 0 | — | | — | | 15 | 2 |
| Ural Yekaterinburg | 2017–18 | Russian Premier League | 6 | 0 | 0 | 0 | — | | — | | 6 | 0 |
| Ural Yekaterinburg | Total | | 92 | 19 | 5 | 1 | - | - | 0 | 0 | 07 | 20 |
| Alashkert | 2018–19 | Armenian Premier League | 21 | 3 | 2 | 0 | 3 | 0 | 0 | 0 | 26 | 3 |
| Pyunik | 2019–20 | Armenian Premier League | 3 | 0 | 0 | 0 | 1 | 1 | — | | 4 | 1 |
| Alashkert | 2019–20 | Armenian Premier League | 5 | 0 | 0 | 0 | 0 | 0 | 0 | 0 | 5 | 0 |
| Career total | | | 250 | 94 | 11 | 1 | 17 | 4 | 2 | 1 | 280 | 100 |

=== International ===
As of match played 5 October 2017

Appearances and goals by national team and year
| National team | Year | Apps | Goals |
|---|---|---|---|
| Armenia | 2004 | 6 | 0 |
| Armenia | 2005 | 3 | 1 |
| Armenia | 2006 | 2 | 0 |
| Armenia | 2007 | 3 | 0 |
| Armenia | 2008 | 3 | 1 |
| Armenia | 2009 | 3 | 0 |
| Armenia | 2010 | 7 | 3 |
| Armenia | 2011 | 8 | 1 |
| Armenia | 2012 | 2 | 1 |
| Armenia | 2013 | 3 | 1 |
| Armenia | 2014 | 6 | 0 |
| Armenia | 2015 | 1 | 0 |
| Armenia | 2016 | 3 | 1 |
| Armenia | 2017 | 4 | 0 |
| Total | | 54 | 9 |

As of goal scored on 28 May 2016
Scores and results list Armenia's goal tally first, score column indicates score after each Armenian goal.

List of international goals scored by Edgar Manucharyan
| No. | Date | Venue | Opponent | Score | Result | Competition | Ref. |
|---|---|---|---|---|---|---|---|
| 1 | 4 June 2005 | Republican Stadium, Yerevan, Armenia | North Macedonia | 1–2 | 1–2 | 2006 FIFA World Cup qualification | |
| 2 | 26 March 2008 | Sportpark De Loswal, Pernis, Netherlands | Kazakhstan | 1–0 | 1–0 | Friendly | |
| 3 | 25 May 2010 | Republican Stadium, Yerevan, Armenia | Uzbekistan | 2–0 | 3–0 | Friendly | |
| 4 | 25 May 2010 | Republican Stadium, Yerevan, Armenia | Uzbekistan | 3–0 | 3–0 | Friendly | |
| 5 | 7 September 2010 | Philip II Arena, Skopje, Macedonia | North Macedonia | 2–1 | 2–2 | UEFA Euro 2012 qualifying | |
| 6 | 9 February 2011 | Tsirion Stadium, Limassol, Cyprus | Georgia | 1–2 | 1–2 | Friendly | |
| 7 | 14 November 2012 | Republican Stadium, Yerevan, Armenia | Lithuania | 1–0 | 4–2 | Friendly | |
| 8 | 5 February 2013 | Stade Josy Barthel, Luxembourg City, Luxembourg | Luxembourg | 1–1 | 1–1 | Friendly | |
| 9 | 28 May 2016 | StubHub Center, Los Angeles, United States | Guatemala | 2–1 | 7–1 | Friendly | |

== Honours ==
Alashkert

- Armenian Cup: 2018–19
