= Chisamba Lungu =

Zambian footballer (born 1991)

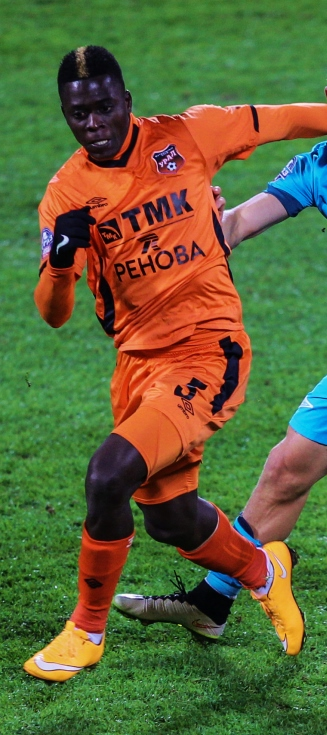
- Lungu with Ural in 2015

Personal information
- Date of birth: 31 January 1991 (age 35)
- Place of birth: Kafue, Zambia
- Height: 1.78 m (5 ft 10 in)
- Position: Midfielder

Team information
- Current team: Nkwazi

Youth career
- 2000–2007: Kafue Celtic
- 2007–2008: Zanaco
- 2009–2009: Kafue Celtic

Senior career*
Years	Team	Apps	(Gls)
2009–2010	Baia Zugdidi	29	(1)
2010–2017	Ural Yekaterinburg	141	(7)
2017–2018	Alanyaspor	10	(1)
2018	Buildcon		
2018–2020	Nkana		
2020–2022	Zanaco		
2022–	Nkwazi		

International career^{‡}
- Zambia U17
2008	Zambia U20	5	(0)
2011–	Zambia U23	3	(0)
2010–	Zambia	45	(1)
- * Club domestic league appearances and goals as of 11 March 2018 ‡ National team caps and goals as of 12 October 2017

Chisamba Lungu (born 31 January 1991) is a former Zambian professional footballer who played as a midfielder for Nkwazi. He was Al so a Zambian international. He primarily played as an attacking midfielder and a winger.He is currently an assistant coach at Russian Club Vista’s academy.

== Career ==
Lungu was born in Kafue, Zambia.

In August 2017, Lungu joined Alanyaspor on a three-year contract. He made his league debut for the club on 25 August 2017 in a 1–1 home draw with Kardemir Karabükspor. He was brought on in the 15th minute for an injured Isaac Sackey.

On 27 February 2018, Lungu returned to Zambia, signing with Buildcon.

In November 2018, Lungu signed for fellow Zambia Super League club Nkana.

Lungu joined Nkwazi in November 2022.

== Career statistics ==
=== Club ===
As of match played 19 January 2018

Appearances and goals by club, season and competition
Club	Season	League			National Cup		Other		Total	
Club	Season	Division	Apps	Goals	Apps	Goals	Apps	Goals	Apps	Goals
Baia Zugdidi	2009–10	Georgian Premier League	29	1	2	0	-		31	1
Ural Yekaterinburg	2010	Football National League	8	0	0	0	-		8	0
Ural Yekaterinburg	2011–12	Football National League	18	0	1	0	-		19	0
Ural Yekaterinburg	2012–13	Football National League	17	2	1	1	-		18	3
Ural Yekaterinburg	2013–14	Russian Premier League	22	0	1	0	-		23	0
Ural Yekaterinburg	2014–15	Russian Premier League	24	1	1	0	2	0	27	1
Ural Yekaterinburg	2015–16	Russian Premier League	18	1	0	0	-		18	1
Ural Yekaterinburg	2016–17	Russian Premier League	29	3	4	0	-		33	3
Ural Yekaterinburg	2017–18	Russian Premier League	5	0	0	0	-		5	0
Ural Yekaterinburg	Total		141	7	8	1	2	0	151	8
Alanyaspor	2017–18	Süper Lig	10	1	3	0	-		13	1
Career total			180	9	13	1	2	0	195	10

=== International ===
Zambia
Year	Apps	Goals
2010	1	0
2011	1	0
2012	13	0
2013	9	0
2014	7	0
2015	7	0
2016	4	1
2017	3	0
Total	45	1

Statistics accurate as of match played 7 October 2017

=== International goals ===
As of match played 8 November 2016

Scores and results list Zambia's goal tally first, score column indicates score after each Lungu goal.

List of international goals scored by Chisamba Lungu
#	Date	Venue	Opponent	Score	Result	Competition	Ref
1.	8 November 2016	Mandela National Stadium, Bweyogerere, Uganda	Uganda	1–0	1–0	Friendly	

== Honours ==
Ural

- Russian National Football League: 2012–13

Zambia

- Africa Cup of Nations: 2012
