= Aleksandr Lomakin =

Russian footballer (born 1995)

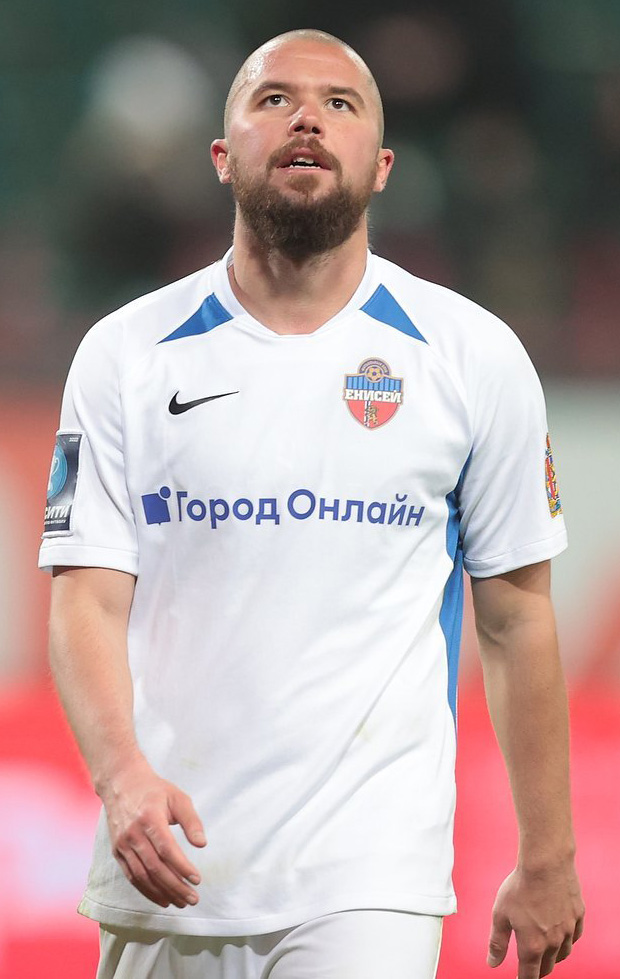
- Lomakin with Yenisey in 2022

Personal information
- Full name: Aleksandr Vladimirovich Lomakin
- Date of birth: 14 February 1995 (age 31)
- Place of birth: Moscow, Russia
- Height: 1.72 m (5 ft 7 1/2 in)
- Position: Midfielder

Team information
- Current team: FC Yenisey Krasnoyarsk
- Number: 90

Youth career
- SDYuSShOR-63 Smena Moscow
- FC Lokomotiv Moscow

Senior career*
Years	Team	Apps	(Gls)
2014–2016	FC Yenisey Krasnoyarsk	34	(5)
2015	→ União de Leiria (loan)	8	(1)
2017–2020	FC Ural Yekaterinburg	2	(0)
2017–2018	→ FC Yenisey Krasnoyarsk (loan)	13	(4)
2018–2019	→ FC Fakel Voronezh (loan)	29	(0)
2019–2020	→ FC Yenisey Krasnoyarsk (loan)	20	(1)
2020–2025	FC Yenisey Krasnoyarsk	158	(41)
2025	FC Orenburg	1	(0)
2025–2026	FC Torpedo Moscow	8	(1)
2026	→ FC Dynamo Brest (loan)	9	(0)
2026–	FC Yenisey Krasnoyarsk	0	(0)

International career
2010	Russia U-15	2	(0)
2010–2011	Russia U-16	14	(9)
2011–2012	Russia U-17	12	(6)
- * Club domestic league appearances and goals as of 27 June 2026

Aleksandr Vladimirovich Lomakin (Russian: Александр Владимирович Ломакин; born 14 February 1995) is a Russian football player who plays for FC Yenisey Krasnoyarsk.

== Club career ==
He made his debut in the Russian Football National League for FC Yenisey Krasnoyarsk on 20 September 2014 in a game against FC Gazovik Orenburg. He made his Russian Premier League debut for FC Ural Yekaterinburg on 25 April 2017 in a game against FC Spartak Moscow. On 19 June 2019, he joined FC Yenisey Krasnoyarsk for the third time on loan until the end of the 2019–20 season. On 4 July 2020 he moved to Yenisey on a permanent basis, signing a 2-year contract.

On 11 September 2025, Lomakin signed a two-season contract with FC Torpedo Moscow.

== Personal life ==
On 3 December 2018, his younger brother Aleksei Lomakin, a member of the Under-21 squad for FC Lokomotiv Moscow, was found dead in Moscow at the age of 18.
