= Andrei Timofeyev =

Russian footballer

Personal information
- Full name: Andrei Olegovich Timofeyev
- Date of birth: 8 February 1996 (age 30)
- Place of birth: Ivdel, Russia
- Height: 1.86 m (6 ft 1 in)
- Position: Goalkeeper

Senior career*
Years	Team	Apps	(Gls)
2013–2018	FC Ural Yekaterinburg	1	(0)
2017	→ FC Ural-2 Yekaterinburg	2	(0)
2018	→ FC Syzran-2003 (loan)	0	(0)
2018–2019	FC Biolog-Novokubansk	23	(0)
2019–2021	FC Kafa Feodosia		
2021–2022	FC Tuapse	28	(0)
- * Club domestic league appearances and goals

Andrei Olegovich Timofeyev (Russian: Андрей Олегович Тимофеев; born 8 February 1996) is a Russian former football player who played as a goalkeeper.

== Club career ==
He made his debut in the Russian Premier League for FC Ural Yekaterinburg on 29 April 2017 in a game against FC Terek Grozny.
