= Aleksandr Sobolev (footballer, born 1995) =

Russian footballer

Personal information
- Full name: Aleksandr Sergeyevich Sobolev
- Date of birth: 30 March 1995 (age 31)
- Place of birth: Yekaterinburg, Russia
- Height: 1.83 m (6 ft 0 in)
- Position: Forward

Senior career*
Years	Team	Apps	(Gls)
2013–2015	Ural Sverdlovsk Oblast	1	(0)
2014	→ FC Kaluga (loan)	4	(0)
2016–2017	Ural-2 Yekaterinburg		
- * Club domestic league appearances and goals

Aleksandr Sergeyevich Sobolev (Russian: Александр Сергеевич Соболев; born 30 March 1995) is a Russian former professional footballer who played as a forward.

== Club career ==
Sobolev made his debut in the Russian Premier League on 8 November 2013 for FC Ural Sverdlovsk Oblast in a game against FC Rostov.
