= Dmitri Korobov (footballer) =

Russian footballer

Dmitry Korobov
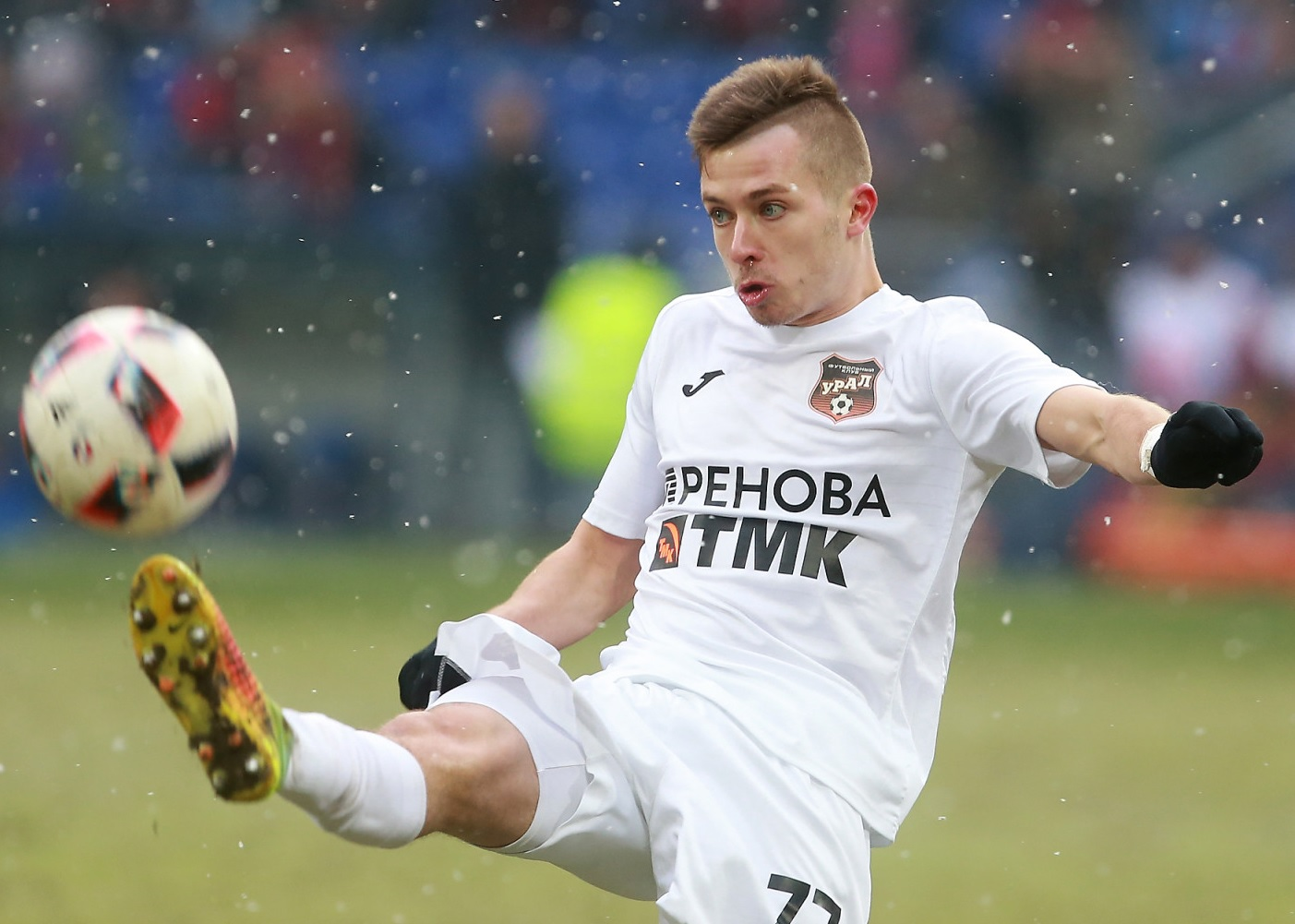
- Korobov with Ural in 2016

Personal information
- Full name: Dmitry Aleksandrovich Korobov
- Date of birth: 10 June 1994 (age 32)
- Place of birth: Vladikavkaz, Russia
- Height: 1.70 m (5 ft 7 in)
- Position: Midfielder

Senior career*
Years	Team	Apps	(Gls)
2012–2013	FC Akademiya Tolyatti	17	(0)
2013–2014	FC Sibir-2 Novosibirsk	24	(6)
2014–2016	FC Fakel Voronezh	43	(3)
2016–2018	FC Ural Yekaterinburg	28	(1)
2017–2018	→ FC Avangard Kursk (loan)	25	(4)
2018–2019	FC Avangard Kursk	36	(2)
2020–2021	FC Fakel Voronezh	17	(0)
2021–2022	FC SKA Rostov-on-Don	40	(8)
2023	FC Chernomorets Novorossiysk	28	(3)
2024	FC Volga Ulyanovsk	10	(1)

International career^{‡}
2012	Russia U-18	2	(0)
2016	Russia U-21	1	(0)
- * Club domestic league appearances and goals as of 16 November 2024 ‡ National team caps and goals as of 1 September 2016

Dmitry Aleksandrovich Korobov (Russian: Дмитрий Александрович Коробов; born 10 June 1994) is a Russian football midfielder. Born in Vladikavkaz. Sports rank: candidate master of sports. First coach - Shalva Genievich Kerashvili. In 2011, recruited under the banner of the youth national team of Russia. In the year 2000. at the age of six Dima included in the Book of records of Russia. Dima juggled the ball using only the feet and to a greater extent head live for 6 hours in the building of the Ostankino. Member of the European phase of the tournament Nike Premier Cup 2009 Genk Belgium.

== Career ==
=== Club ===
Started playing football in 2000 in the school Vladikavkazkoy "Youth". In 2005 the team "Yunost" (Vladikavkaz) took second place at the Largest Junior tournament "Leather ball" was named best midfielder and became the top scorer in the tournament. In 2006, he continued his football education at the Academy of football of a name of Yury Konoplyov. Became the Champion of Russia among boys born in 1994.In 2012 was declared on the championship Togliatti "Academy". He made his debut in the Russian Second Division for FC Akademiya Tolyatti on 30 May 2012 in a game against FC Nosta Novotroitsk. At this time, the player was to watch FC Siberia, and in the summer he was invited to the show. In December, Dmitry signed a contract with "Novosibirsk" for 1 year, but played for the team Sibiraj-2. After a great season in the second team, Dmitry Korobov took the first team of Novosibirsk, but he refused. Went to Volgograd, even the contract had to sign, but in the end, "Rotor" left FNL. After that, there was an option to "Torch". And 7 July 2014 signed a contract with the Voronezh club for 2 years.

He made his official debut for the first team of "blue-whites" on 12 July 2014, in the PFL game against FC Metallurg Vyksa (2–0), in which he played all 90 minutes, scored a goal and an assist.

He made his Russian Premier League debut for FC Ural Yekaterinburg on 7 March 2016 in a game against FC Dynamo Moscow.

He played in the 2017–18 Russian Cup final for FC Avangard Kursk on 9 May 2018 in the Volgograd Arena against 2-1 winners FC Tosno.
