= Sergei Podoksyonov =

Russian footballer

Personal information
- Full name: Sergei Yuryevich Podoksyonov
- Date of birth: 29 July 1997 (age 29)
- Place of birth: Irbit, Russia
- Height: 1.66 m (5 ft 5 in)
- Position: Midfielder

Senior career*
Years	Team	Apps	(Gls)
2015–2018	FC Ural Yekaterinburg	9	(0)
2017	→ FC Zenit Penza (loan)	10	(0)
2018	→ FC Ural-2 Yekaterinburg	12	(1)
2019–2024	FC Irtysh Omsk	113	(6)
- * Club domestic league appearances and goals as of 8 June 2024

Sergei Yuryevich Podoksyonov (Russian: Сергей Юрьевич Подоксёнов; born 29 July 1997) is a Russian football player.

== Club career ==
He made his debut for FC Ural Yekaterinburg on 21 September 2016 in a Russian Cup game against FC Chelyabinsk.

He made his Russian Premier League debut for FC Ural Yekaterinburg on 25 September 2016 against FC Orenburg.
