= Ivan Melnik =

Russian footballer (born 1991)

Personal information
- Full name: Ivan Yevgenyevich Melnik
- Date of birth: 29 July 1991 (age 35)
- Place of birth: Tselinograd Oblast, Kazakh SSR
- Height: 1.93 m (6 ft 4 in)
- Position: Midfielder

Youth career
- FC Ural Yekaterinburg

Senior career*
Years	Team	Apps	(Gls)
2011–2015	FC Ural Yekaterinburg	5	(0)
2013–2014	→ Dynamo St. Petersburg (loan)	26	(1)
2014	→ FC Khimik Dzerzhinsk (loan)	1	(0)
- * Club domestic league appearances and goals

Ivan Yevgenyevich Melnik (Russian: Иван Евгеньевич Мельник; born 29 July 1991) is a former Russian football forward.

== Club career ==
He made his debut in the Russian Football National League for FC Ural Yekaterinburg on 9 July 2012 in a game against FC Petrotrest St. Petersburg. Overall, he played all 3 seasons of his pro career in the FNL.
