= Artyom Fidler =

Russian professional footballer

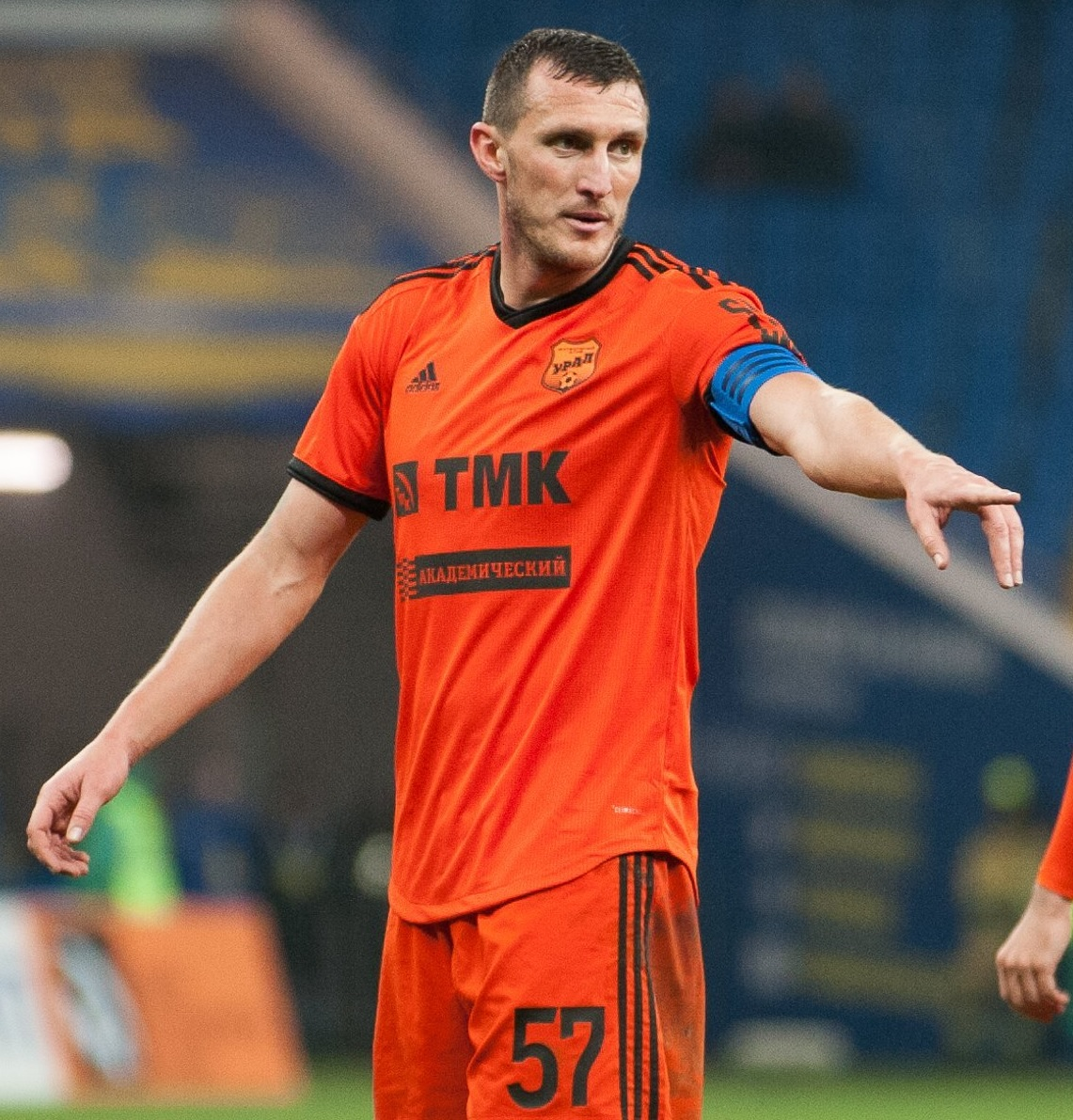
- Fidler with Ural in 2019

Personal information
- Full name: Artyom Igorevich Fidler
- Date of birth: 14 July 1983 (age 43)
- Place of birth: Sverdlovsk, Russian SFSR
- Height: 1.78 m (5 ft 10 in)
- Position: Midfielder

Team information
- Current team: FC Ural Sverdlovsk Oblast (administrator)

Senior career*
Years	Team	Apps	(Gls)
2001	FC Yuzhny Yekaterinburg		
2003	FC Atlant Yekaterinburg		
2004	FC Metallurg Zlatoust		
2005–2010	FC Ural Sverdlovsk Oblast	171	(15)
2011–2013	FC Kuban Krasnodar	49	(2)
2014–2020	FC Ural Sverdlovsk Oblast	115	(1)

Managerial career
- 2020–: FC Ural Sverdlovsk Oblast (administrator)
- * Club domestic league appearances and goals

Artyom Igorevich Fidler (Russian: Артём Игоревич Фидлер; born 14 July 1983) is a Russian professional football official and a former player who played as a defensive midfielder. He works as an administrator for FC Ural Sverdlovsk Oblast.

== Club career ==
He made his professional debut in the Russian First Division in 2005 for FC Ural Yekaterinburg.

== Career statistics ==
=== Club ===
As of 13 May 2018

Club	Season	League			Cup		Continental		Other		Total	
Club	Season	Division	Apps	Goals	Apps	Goals	Apps	Goals	Apps	Goals	Apps	Goals
FC Ural Yekaterinburg	2005	FNL	15	0	1	0	–		–		16	0
FC Ural Yekaterinburg	2006	FNL	26	0	2	1	–		–		28	1
FC Ural Yekaterinburg	2007	FNL	35	6	4	0	–		–		39	6
FC Ural Yekaterinburg	2008	FNL	32	5	1	1	–		–		33	6
FC Ural Yekaterinburg	2009	FNL	33	1	3	0	–		–		36	1
FC Ural Yekaterinburg	2010	FNL	30	3	0	0	–		–		30	3
FC Kuban Krasnodar	2011–12	Russian Premier League	26	0	0	0	–		–		26	0
FC Kuban Krasnodar	2012–13	Russian Premier League	15	2	2	0	–		–		17	2
FC Kuban Krasnodar	2013–14	Russian Premier League	8	0	1	0	5	0	–		14	0
FC Kuban Krasnodar	Total		49	2	3	0	5	0	0	0	57	2
FC Ural Yekaterinburg	2013–14	Russian Premier League	9	0	–		–		–		9	0
FC Ural Yekaterinburg	2014–15	Russian Premier League	19	0	1	0	–		1 (Note: One appearance in relegation play-offs)	0	21	0
FC Ural Yekaterinburg	2015–16	Russian Premier League	21	0	1	0	–		–		22	0
FC Ural Yekaterinburg	2016–17	Russian Premier League	24	1	3	0	–		–		27	1
FC Ural Yekaterinburg	2017–18	Russian Premier League	22	0	0	0	–		–		22	0
FC Ural Yekaterinburg	Total (2 spells)		266	16	16	2	0	0	1	0	283	18
Career total			315	18	19	2	5	0	1	0	340	20
