= Aleksandr Novikov (footballer, born 1984) =

Russian footballer

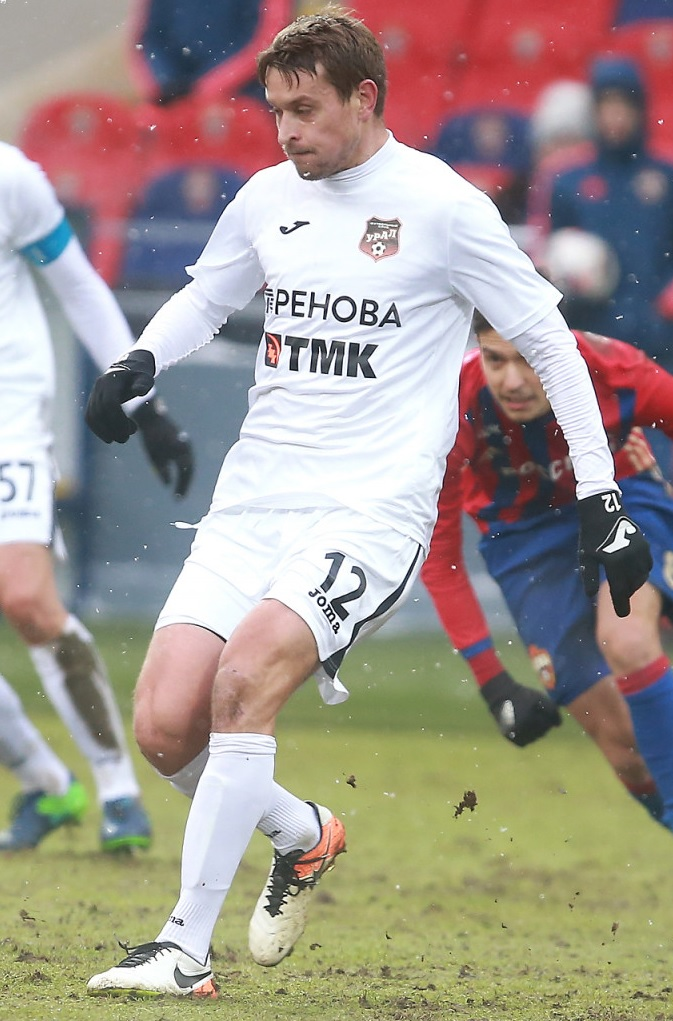
- Novikov with FC Ural in 2016

Personal information
- Full name: Aleksandr Aleksandrovich Novikov
- Date of birth: 12 October 1984 (age 42)
- Place of birth: Omsk, Russian SFSR
- Height: 1.86 m (6 ft 1 in)
- Positions: Defender; midfielder

Youth career
- Dynamo Omsk

Senior career*
Years	Team	Apps	(Gls)
2003	Chkalovets-1936	21	(1)
2004–2008	Irtysh-1946	132	(17)
2009–2017	Ural Sverdlovsk Oblast	147	(4)
2009	→ Yenisey Krasnoyarsk (loan)	8	(0)
2017–2018	Yenisey Krasnoyarsk	22	(2)
- * Club domestic league appearances and goals

Aleksandr Aleksandrovich Novikov (Russian: Александр Александрович Новиков; born 12 October 1984) is a former Russian professional football player. He played as a centre back.
