= Aleksandr Dantsev =

Russian footballer

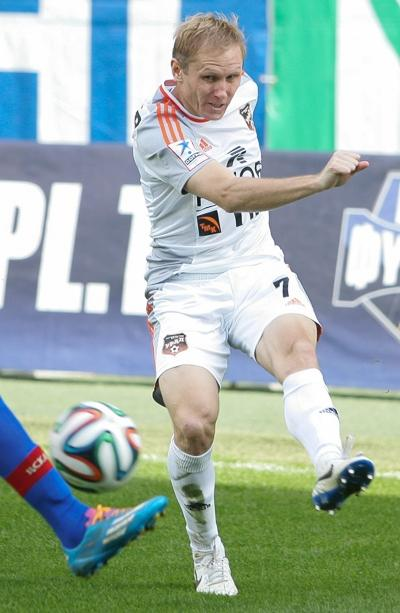
- Dantsev with FC Ural in 2014

Personal information
- Full name: Aleksandr Alekseyevich Dantsev
- Date of birth: 14 October 1984 (age 42)
- Place of birth: Kamensk-Shakhtinsky, Russian SFSR
- Height: 1.78 m (5 ft 10 in)
- Position: Defender

Team information
- Current team: Dynamo Barnaul (manager)

Youth career
- FC Nika Krasny Sulin
- FC Progress Kamensk-Shakhtinsky
- RO UOR Rostov

Senior career*
| Years | Team | Apps | (Gls) |
| 2000–2007 | FC Rostov | 92 | (5) |
| 2000 | → Rostselmash-2 | 4 | (0) |
| 2008 | Khimki | 5 | (0) |
| 2008–2010 | Luch-Energiya | 84 | (1) |
| 2011–2019 | Ural Yekaterinburg | 178 | (1) |

International career
| 2004–2006 | Russia U-21 | 10 | (0) |

Managerial career
- 2019–2021: Ural Yekaterinburg (U19 assistant)
- 2021–2023: Ural Yekaterinburg (U19)
- 2023: Zenit Penza
- 2023–2025: Ural-2 Yekaterinburg
- 2025–2026: Znamya Truda
- 2026–: Dynamo Barnaul
- * Club domestic league appearances and goals

Aleksandr Alekseyevich Dantsev (Russian: Александр Алексеевич Данцев; born 14 October 1984) is a Russian football coach and a former player who played as a left-back. He is the manager of Dynamo Barnaul.

== Career statistics ==
=== Club ===
As of 13 May 2018

| Club | Season | League | | | Cup | | Continental | | Other | | Total | |
| Club | Season | Division | Apps | Goals | Apps | Goals | Apps | Goals | Apps | Goals | Apps | Goals |
|---|---|---|---|---|---|---|---|---|---|---|---|---|
| Rostselmash-2 | 2000 | PFL | 4 | 0 | – | | – | | – | | 4 | 0 |
| Rostov | 2000 | Russian Premier League | 0 | 0 | 0 | 0 | 0 | 0 | – | | 0 | 0 |
| Rostov | 2001 | Russian Premier League | 0 | 0 | 0 | 0 | – | | – | | 0 | 0 |
| Rostov | 2002 | Russian Premier League | 0 | 0 | 0 | 0 | – | | – | | 0 | 0 |
| Rostov | 2003 | Russian Premier League | 1 | 0 | 3 | 0 | – | | 1 (Note: One appearance in the Russian Premier League Cup) | 0 | 5 | 0 |
| Rostov | 2004 | Russian Premier League | 18 | 1 | 2 | 0 | – | | – | | 20 | 1 |
| Rostov | 2005 | Russian Premier League | 21 | 0 | 3 | 0 | – | | – | | 24 | 0 |
| Rostov | 2006 | Russian Premier League | 29 | 3 | 2 | 0 | – | | – | | 31 | 3 |
| Rostov | 2007 | Russian Premier League | 23 | 1 | 4 | 2 | – | | – | | 27 | 3 |
| Rostov | Total | | 92 | 5 | 14 | 2 | 0 | 0 | 1 | 0 | 107 | 7 |
| Khimki | 2008 | Russian Premier League | 5 | 0 | – | | – | | – | | 5 | 0 |
| Luch-Energiya | 2008 | Russian Premier League | 14 | 0 | 0 | 0 | – | | – | | 14 | 0 |
| Luch-Energiya | 2009 | FNL | 34 | 1 | 2 | 0 | – | | – | | 36 | 1 |
| Luch-Energiya | 2010 | FNL | 36 | 0 | 3 | 0 | – | | – | | 39 | 0 |
| Luch-Energiya | Total | | 84 | 1 | 5 | 0 | 0 | 0 | 0 | 0 | 89 | 1 |
| Ural Yekaterinburg | 2011–12 | FNL | 41 | 1 | 0 | 0 | – | | – | | 41 | 1 |
| Ural Yekaterinburg | 2012–13 | FNL | 25 | 0 | 2 | 0 | – | | – | | 27 | 0 |
| Ural Yekaterinburg | 2013–14 | Russian Premier League | 22 | 0 | 1 | 0 | – | | – | | 23 | 0 |
| Ural Yekaterinburg | 2014–15 | Russian Premier League | 26 | 0 | 0 | 0 | – | | 2 (Note: Two appearances in relegation play-offs) | 0 | 28 | 0 |
| Ural Yekaterinburg | 2015–16 | Russian Premier League | 23 | 0 | 2 | 0 | – | | – | | 25 | 0 |
| Ural Yekaterinburg | 2016–17 | Russian Premier League | 27 | 0 | 4 | 0 | – | | – | | 31 | 0 |
| Ural Yekaterinburg | 2017–18 | Russian Premier League | 11 | 0 | 1 | 0 | – | | – | | 12 | 0 |
| Ural Yekaterinburg | Total | | 175 | 1 | 10 | 0 | 0 | 0 | 2 | 0 | 187 | 1 |
| Career total | | | 360 | 7 | 29 | 2 | 0 | 0 | 3 | 0 | 392 | 9 |
