= 2021–22 FC Ural Yekaterinburg season =

FC Ural Yekaterinburg
2021–22 season
- Owner: Sverdlovsk Oblast
- General director: Grigori Ivanov
- Head coach: Yuri Matveyev
- Stadium: Ekaterinburg Arena
- Premier League: 12th
- Russian Cup: Round of 32
- Top goalscorer: League: Eric Bicfalvi (10); All: Eric Bicfalvi (10)
- Highest home attendance: 26,402 vs Spartak Moscow (7 May 2022)
- Lowest home attendance: 460 vs Dynamo Moscow (21 August 2021)
- Average home league attendance: 5,140 (15 May 2022)
Home colours	Away colours	Third colours
- All statistics correct as of start of October 2021.

The 2021–22 season was the 64th season in the existence of FC Ural Yekaterinburg and the club's 19th consecutive season in the top flight of Russian football. In addition to the domestic league, FC Ural Yekaterinburg are participated in this season's editions of the Russian Cup.

== Players ==
Note: Flags indicate national team as defined under FIFA eligibility rules; some limited exceptions apply. Players may hold more than one non-FIFA nationality.

No.	Pos.	Nation	Player
1	GK	RUS	Ilya Pomazun (on loan from CSKA Moscow)
3	DF	RUS	Leo Goglichidze (on loan from Krasnodar)
5	MF	RUS	Andrei Yegorychev
6	MF	POL	Rafał Augustyniak
7	MF	RUS	Aleksandr Yushin
8	MF	RUS	Roman Yemelyanov
9	FW	RUS	Mikhail Ageyev
10	MF	ROU	Eric Bicfalvi
11	MF	RUS	Ramazan Gadzhimuradov
13	GK	RUS	Dmitry Landakov
14	MF	RUS	Yuri Zheleznov
16	MF	RUS	Dmitry Makovsky

No.	Pos.	Nation	Player
19	MF	CRO	Danijel Miškić
21	MF	RUS	Vyacheslav Podberyozkin
24	DF	RUS	Kirill Kolesnichenko
25	DF	RUS	Ivan Kuzmichyov
27	MF	RUS	Oleg Shatov
29	DF	RUS	Artyom Mamin
30	MF	RUS	Aleksey Yevseyev
59	GK	RUS	Vladimir Panov
66	DF	SRB	Dominik Dinga
93	DF	RUS	Aleksey Gerasimov
95	DF	RUS	Chingiz Magomadov

=== Other players under contract ===
Note: Flags indicate national team as defined under FIFA eligibility rules; some limited exceptions apply. Players may hold more than one non-FIFA nationality.

No.	Pos.	Nation	Player
—	DF	UKR	Denys Kulakov (contract suspended)

=== Out on loan ===
Note: Flags indicate national team as defined under FIFA eligibility rules; some limited exceptions apply. Players may hold more than one non-FIFA nationality.

No.	Pos.	Nation	Player
—	GK	RUS	Oleg Baklov (at KAMAZ Naberezhnye Chelny)
—	GK	RUS	Aleksei Mamin (at KAMAZ Naberezhnye Chelny)
—	GK	RUS	Vladislav Poletayev (at Tom Tomsk)
—	DF	RUS	Nikita Chistyakov (at Akron Tolyatti)
—	DF	RUS	Islamzhan Nasyrov (at Tyumen)
—	MF	RUS	Yuri Bavin (at Rotor Volgograd)

No.	Pos.	Nation	Player
—	MF	RUS	Aleksandr Galimov (at SKA-Khabarovsk)
—	MF	RUS	Artyom Shabolin (at Orenburg)
—	FW	RUS	David Karayev (at SKA-Khabarovsk)
—	FW	RUS	Artyom Maksimenko (at Baltika Kaliningrad)
—	FW	RUS	Andrei Panyukov (at Kyzylzhar)
—	FW	RUS	Artyom Yusupov (at Volgar Astrakhan)

== Transfers ==
=== Summer ===
In: Note: Flags indicate national team as defined under FIFA eligibility rules; some limited exceptions apply. Players may hold more than one non-FIFA nationality.

No.	Pos.	Nation	Player
1	GK	RUS	Ilya Pomazun (on loan from CSKA Moscow)
9	FW	RUS	Mikhail Ageyev (from Lokomotiv Moscow)
13	GK	RUS	Dmitry Landakov (from Ural-2 Yekaterinburg)
14	MF	RUS	Yuri Zheleznov (from Saturn Ramenskoye)
24	MF	RUS	Kirill Kolesnichenko (from (Kazakhstan) Kairat)
29	DF	RUS	Artyom Mamin (end of loan to Tom Tomsk, previously on loan to Chayka Peschanokopskoye, previously on loan to Orenburg)
34	MF	GEO	Luka Gagnidze (on loan from Dynamo Moscow)
41	MF	RUS	Nikita Zuykov
42	DF	RUS	Yegor Mosin (from UOR #5 Yegoryevsk)
43	MF	RUS	Yury Permyakov
45	DF	RUS	Matvei Anikin
46	MF	RUS	Vladislav Bulatov
47	MF	RUS	Dmitri Osipov
48	MF	RUS	Artyom Komarov (from Zenit St. Petersburg academy)
52	MF	RUS	Maksim Podluzhny
61	DF	RUS	Aleksey Lopatin (from Chertanovo Education Center)
63	DF	RUS	Mikhail Nenashev (from UOR #5 Yegoryevsk)
68	GK	RUS	Mikhail Gaydash (from Lokomotiv Moscow academy)
69	GK	RUS	Stepan Permyakov
76	DF	RUS	Dmitri Mamchich
80	MF	RUS	Ivan Galanin (from Lokomotiv Moscow)
82	MF	RUS	Denis Melyokhin
84	MF	RUS	Semyon Romashov
85	DF	RUS	Viktor Kozyrev (from Smolensk)
88	DF	RUS	Artyom Shmykov (from Irtysh Omsk)
—	DF	RUS	Leo Goglichidze (on loan from Krasnodar)

Out: Note: Flags indicate national team as defined under FIFA eligibility rules; some limited exceptions apply. Players may hold more than one non-FIFA nationality.

No.	Pos.	Nation	Player
4	DF	NOR	Stefan Strandberg (to (Italy) Salernitana)
8	MF	RUS	Roman Yemelyanov (not registered with the league)
9	FW	RUS	Pavel Pogrebnyak
13	DF	RUS	Ihor Kalinin (to Rostov, previously from Dynamo Moscow, previously on loan)
26	MF	RUS	Anton Chebykin (to Ural-2 Yekaterinburg)
28	MF	RUS	Yuri Bavin (on loan to Rotor Volgograd, previously on loan to Tambov)
28	GK	RUS	Ivan Konovalov (end of loan from Rubin Kazan)
37	GK	RUS	Dmitri Lebedev
38	DF	RUS	Danila Zaysunov
39	DF	RUS	Aleksandr Pukhayev (to Khimki)
41	DF	RUS	Nikita Kuznetsov
42	MF	RUS	Konstantin Sysoyev
43	MF	RUS	Aleksandr Golubtsov (to Amkar Perm)
47	MF	RUS	Aleksei Bulka
48	DF	RUS	Roman Silman
49	DF	RUS	Kirill Gurov
50	DF	RUS	Ilya Nasonkin
52	FW	RUS	Igor Voronin
58	MF	NED	Othman El Kabir
61	MF	RUS	Aleksandr Chernyshyov
63	MF	RUS	Artyom Suyetin
66	DF	RUS	Kirill Dervenyov
67	MF	RUS	Pavel Makarov (to Ural-2 Yekaterinburg)
68	FW	RUS	Ilya Grinyuk
70	MF	RUS	Anatoli Anisimov (to Veles Moscow)
71	FW	RUS	Daniil Arsentyev (to Ural-2 Yekaterinburg)
75	DF	RUS	Nikita Chistyakov (on loan to Akron Tolyatti)
76	GK	RUS	Ilya Ignatyev (to Torpedo Miass)
77	GK	RUS	Oleg Baklov (on loan to KAMAZ Naberezhnye Chelny)
82	FW	RUS	Danil Vorobyov
84	DF	RUS	Arsen Agakhanov (to Torpedo Miass)
86	GK	RUS	Maksim Moskovets
95	DF	RUS	Chingiz Magomadov (on loan to KAMAZ Naberezhnye Chelny)
98	DF	RUS	Islamzhan Nasyrov (on loan to Tyumen)
—	GK	RUS	Vladislav Poletayev (on loan to Orenburg, previously on loan to Irtysh Omsk)
—	MF	RUS	Aleksandr Galimov (on loan to SKA-Khabarovsk, previously on loan to Yenisey Krasnoyarsk)
—	MF	RUS	Artyom Shabolin (on loan to Orenburg, previously on loan to Yenisey Krasnoyarsk)
—	FW	RUS	David Karayev (on loan to SKA-Khabarovsk, previously on loan to (Kazakhstan) Caspiy)

=== Winter ===
In: Note: Flags indicate national team as defined under FIFA eligibility rules; some limited exceptions apply. Players may hold more than one non-FIFA nationality.

No.	Pos.	Nation	Player
7	MF	RUS	Aleksandr Yushin (from Neftekhimik Nizhnekamsk)
8	DF	RUS	Roman Yemelyanov (return from injury)
27	MF	RUS	Oleg Shatov (from Rubin Kazan)
38	GK	RUS	Nikita Zyryanov (from Konoplyov football academy)
52	DF	RUS	Artyom Ilyin
58	DF	RUS	Aleksey Polev
61	MF	RUS	Vladislav Barabash
66	DF	SRB	Dominik Dinga (end of loan to (Belarus) Dinamo Minsk)
78	MF	RUS	Kirill Boyarskikh (from Rostov academy)
82	MF	RUS	Andrey Reznik
86	GK	RUS	Ivan Kuznetsov
89	MF	RUS	Pavel Mikhaylov
92	DF	RUS	Damir Maksimov
95	MF	RUS	Chingiz Magomadov (end of loan to KAMAZ Naberezhnye Chelny)
96	FW	RUS	Muslim Gamidov
97	FW	RUS	Ilya Ishkov

Out: Note: Flags indicate national team as defined under FIFA eligibility rules; some limited exceptions apply. Players may hold more than one non-FIFA nationality.

No.	Pos.	Nation	Player
4	DF	RUS	Vladimir Rykov (to Rodina Moscow)
15	DF	UKR	Denys Kulakov (contract suspended)
17	FW	KOS	Ylldren Ibrahimaj (to (Norway) Lillestrøm)
17	MF	GEO	Luka Tsulukidze (contract suspended, previously from (Georgia (country)) Saburtalo Tbilisi)
18	MF	SRB	Branko Jovičić (to (Austria) LASK)
20	FW	RUS	Andrei Panyukov (on loan to (Kazakhstan) Kyzylzhar)
31	GK	UKR	Yaroslav Hodzyur
34	MF	GEO	Luka Gagnidze (end of loan from Dynamo Moscow)
45	DF	RUS	Matvey Anikin
52	MF	RUS	Maksim Podluzhny
55	FW	RUS	Artyom Maksimenko (on loan to Baltika Kaliningrad)
58	DF	RUS	Ilya Tkachenko
82	MF	RUS	Denis Melyokhin
89	MF	RUS	Kirill Gerasimov
95	DF	RUS	Arsen Adamov (to Zenit St. Petersburg)
—	GK	RUS	Vladislav Poletayev (on loan to Tom Tomsk, previously on loan to Orenburg)

== Pre-season and friendlies ==
Win Draw Loss Fixtures

== Competitions ==
=== Overview ===
Competition	First match	Last match	Starting round	Final position	Record							
Competition	First match	Last match	Starting round	Final position	Pld	W	D	L	GF	GA	GD	Win %
Premier League	25 July 2021	May 2022	Matchday 1		28	6	9	13	22	34	−12	21.43
Russian Cup	23 September 2021	27 October 2021	Group stage	Group stage	2	1	0	1	2	1	+1	50.00
Total					30	7	9	14	24	35	−11	23.33

Last updated: 7 May 2022
Source: Soccerway

=== Premier League ===
==== League table ====
Pos	Team	Pld	W	D	L	GF	GA	GD	Pts	Qualification or relegation
10	Spartak Moscow	30	10	8	12	37	41	−4	38 (Note: Head-to-head points: Rostov 4, Spartak Moscow 1.)	
11	Nizhny Novgorod	30	8	9	13	26	39	−13	33 (Note: Head-to-head points: Nizhny Novgorod 4, Ural Yekaterinburg 1.)	
12	Ural Yekaterinburg	30	8	9	13	27	35	−8	33	
13	Khimki (O)	30	7	11	12	34	47	−13	32	Qualification for the relegation play-offs
14	Ufa (R)	30	6	12	12	29	40	−11	30	Qualification for the relegation play-offs

Source: Premier Liga
Rules for classification: 1) Points; 2) Head-to-head points; 3) Head-to-head matches won; 4) Head-to-head goal difference; 5) Head-to-head goals scored; 6) Matches won; 7) Goal difference; 8) Goals scored; 9) 2020–21 position (not applicable to final standings); 10) Play-off.
(O) Play-off winners; (R) Relegated

==== Results summary ====
Overall								Home						Away					
Pld	W	D	L	GF	GA	GD	Pts	W	D	L	GF	GA	GD	W	D	L	GF	GA	GD
30	8	9	13	27	35	−8	33	3	6	6	11	14	−3	5	3	7	16	21	−5

Last updated: 21 May 2022.
Source: FBref

==== Results by round ====
Round	1	2	3	4	5	6	7	8	9	10	11	12	13	14	15	16	17	18	19	20	21	22	23	24	25	26	27	28	29	30
Ground	H	H	A	A	H	H	A	H	H	A	Н	A	А	H	A	Н	А	A	A	A	H	H	A	H	A	H	A	H	H	A
Result	L	D	L	L	L	D	L	D	W	W	L	L	D	D	D	D	W	W	L	L	D	L	D	L	L	W	W	L	W	W
Position	16	12	15	16	16	16	16	16	16	12	14	16	16	16	16	16	14	11	12	14	14	13	13	14	15	14	14	14	12	12

Updated to match(es) played on 21 May 2022. Source: Premier Liga
A = Away; H = Home; W = Win; D = Draw; L = Loss

==== Results ====
25 July 2021 1	Ural Yekaterinburg	0 – 3	Krasnodar	Yekaterinburg
17:30 YEKT (UTC+5)	Bicfalvi (penalty missed) 45+' (yellow card) 60'; Gerasimov (yellow card) 77'	Report	Spertsyan (yellow card) 53'; Vilhena 62', 85'; Chernikov (yellow card) 89'; Córdoba 90+' (pen.)	Stadium: Central Stadium; Attendance: 471; Referee: Vasily Kazartsev

1 August 2021 2	Ural Yekaterinburg	1 – 1	Nizhny Novgorod	Yekaterinburg
19:30 YEKT (UTC+5)	Panyukov 32'	Report	Suleymanov 55'	Stadium: Central Stadium; Attendance: 482; Referee: Aleksey Amelin

9 August 2021 3	Sochi	2 – 0	Ural Yekaterinburg	Sochi
21:00 YEKT (UTC+5)	Popov 8'; Burmistrov (yellow card) 59'; Noboa 71' (pen.)	Report	Miškić (yellow card) 63'; Gerasimov (yellow card) 70'	Stadium: Fisht Olympic Stadium; Attendance: 467; Referee: Kirill Levnikov

14 August 2021 4	Spartak Moscow	1 – 0	Ural Yekaterinburg	Moscow
18:30 YEKT (UTC+5)	Rasskazov (yellow card) 23'; Zobnin 27'; Gigot (yellow card) 42'	Report	Gerasimov (yellow card) 33'; Hodzyur (yellow card) 45'; Yegorychev (yellow card) 76'	Stadium: Otkritie Arena; Attendance: 2,945; Referee: Evgeni Kukulyak

21 August 2021 5	Ural Yekaterinburg	0 – 1	Dynamo Moscow	Yekaterinburg
20:00 YEKT (UTC+5)	Bicfalvi (yellow card) 31' (yellow-red card) 32'; Jovičić (yellow card) 90+4'	Report	Laxalt (yellow card) 11'; Tyukavin 17'; Skopintsev (yellow card) 80'	Stadium: Central Stadium; Attendance: 460; Referee: Ivan Sidekov

27 August 2021 6	Ural Yekaterinburg	1 – 1	Rostov	Yekaterinburg
18:30 YEKT (UTC+5)	Ibrahimaj (yellow card) 14'; Rykov (yellow card) 53'; Maksimenko 82'	Report	Poloz 76'	Stadium: Central Stadium; Attendance: 496; Referee: Artyom Lyubimov

12 September 2021 7	Rubin Kazan	4 – 0	Ural Yekaterinburg	Kazan
20:30 YEKT (UTC+5)	Dreyer 2', 80', 90+'; Mamin 13' (o.g.); Hwang (yellow card) 19'; Hakšabanović (yellow card) 52'; Abildgaard (yellow card) 55'; Onugkha (yellow card) 87'	Report	Gadzhimuradov (yellow card) 36'	Stadium: Central Stadium; Attendance: 6,077; Referee: Vladimir Moskalyov

20 September 2021 8	Ural Yekaterinburg	0 – 0	Lokomotiv Moscow	Yekaterinburg
18:30 YEKT (UTC+5)	Bicfalvi (yellow card) 33'; Adamov (yellow card) 43'; Miškić (yellow card) 90+'	Report	Kamano (yellow card) 90+'; Jedvaj (yellow card) 90+'	Stadium: Central Stadium; Attendance: 834; Referee: Aleksey Sukhoi

27 September 2021 9	Ural Yekaterinburg	2 – 0	Arsenal Tula	Yekaterinburg
19:00 YEKT (UTC+5)	Bicfalvi 5'; Yegorychev 32'; Gerasimov (yellow card) 45+'; Kuzmichyov (yellow card) 65'; Kolesnichenko (yellow card) 90+'; Pomazun (yellow card) 90+'	Report	Markov (yellow card) 19+'; Björnström (yellow card) 75'; Belyayev (yellow card) 90+'	Stadium: Central Stadium; Attendance: 751; Referee: Alexey Matyunin

3 October 2021 10	Ufa	0 – 1	Ural Yekaterinburg	Ufa
16:00 YEKT (UTC+5)	Ivanov (yellow card) 8'; Nikitin (yellow card) 90+2'	Report	Bicfalvi 34' (yellow card) 38'; Miškić (yellow card) 68'	Stadium: BetBoom Arena; Attendance: 679; Referee: Vitali Meshkov

17 October 2021 11	Ural Yekaterinburg	0 – 1	CSKA Moscow	Yekaterinburg
16:00 YEKT (UTC+5)	Goglichidze (yellow card) 62'	Report	Ejuke 52'	Stadium: Central Stadium; Attendance: 487; Referee: Artyom Lyubimov

24 October 2012 12	Akhmat Grozny	1 – 0	Ural Yekaterinburg	Grozny
18:30 YEKT (UTC+5)	Sebai 71'; Timofeyev (yellow card) 76'	Report	Gerasimov (yellow card) 29'	Stadium: Akhmat-Arena; Attendance: 6,389; Referee: Sergei Karasev

31 October 2021 13	Khimki	0 – 0	Ural Yekaterinburg	Khimki
19:00 YEKT (UTC+5)	Karpov (yellow card) 84'; Dagerstål (yellow card) 87'; Bozhenov (yellow card) 90+3'	Report	Mamin (yellow card) 58'; Jovičić (yellow card) 74'	Stadium: Arena Khimki; Referee: Pavel Kukuyan

7 November 2021 14	Ural Yekaterinburg	0–0	Zenit St.Petersburg	Yekaterinburg
16:00 YEKT (UTC+5)	Yegorychev (yellow card) 20'	Report	Rakitskyi (yellow card) 34'; Claudinho (red card) 51'; Chistyakov (yellow card) 87'	Stadium: Ekaterinburg Arena; Attendance: 492; Referee: Igor Panin

20 November 2021 15	Krylia Sovetov	1 – 1	Ural Yekaterinburg	Samara
16:00 YEKT (UTC+5)	Ar.Mamin 59' (o.g.); Bijl (yellow card) 65'; Prutsev (yellow card) 72'; Ivanisenya (yellow card) 90+'	Report	Augustyniak (yellow card) 7'; Kolesnichenko (yellow card) 47'; Gagnidze (yellow card) 70'; Adamov (yellow card) 86'; Zheleznov 90'	Stadium: Solidarnost Arena; Attendance: 3,441; Referee: Kirill Levnikov

27 November 2021 16	Ural Yekaterinburg	1 – 1	Sochi	Yekaterinburg
16:00 YEKT (UTC+5)	Bicfalvi (yellow card) 27'; Augustyniak 34'	Report	Terekhov (yellow card) 43'; Cassierra (yellow card) 47'; Barać (yellow card) 62' (yellow-red card) 74'; Noboa 68'	Stadium: Central Stadium; Attendance: 1,390; Referee: Artyom Lyubimov

4 December 2021 17	Lokomotiv Moscow	0 – 1	Ural Yekaterinburg	Moscow
21:00 YEKT (UTC+5)	Barinov (yellow card) 0'; Rybus (yellow card) 31'; Jedvaj (red card) 47'; Nenakhov (yellow card) 61'	Report	Gerasimov (yellow card) 7'; Augustyniak 42' (pen.); Yevseyev (yellow card) 69'; Kuzmichyov (yellow card) 76'; Gagnidze (yellow card) 87'	Stadium: RZD Arena; Attendance: 3,336; Referee: Kirill Levnikov

11 December 2021 18	Rostov	1 – 4	Ural Yekaterinburg	Rostov-on-Don
21:00 YEKT (UTC+5)	Bayramyan (yellow card) 9'; Poloz 19' (pen.); Osipenko (yellow card) 37'; Langovich (yellow card) 74'; Folmer (yellow card) 81'	Report	Gadzhimuradov 3', 39' (yellow card) 81'; Adamov 6'; Bicfalvi 43'; Yegorychev (yellow card) 56'	Stadium: Rostov Arena; Attendance: 5,255; Referee: Pavel Kukuyan

26 February 2022 19	Nizhny Novgorod	1 – 0	Ural Yekaterinburg	Nizhny Novgorod
16:00 YEKT (UTC+5)	Aleksandrov (yellow card) 66'; Kalinsky 78' (pen.)	Report	Kolesnichenko (yellow card) 38' (yellow-red card) 55'; Yegorychev (yellow card) 45+1'; Goglichidze (red card) 77'; Kuzmichyov (yellow card) 79'; Mamin (yellow card) 90'; Pomazun (yellow card) 90+3'; Zheleznov (yellow card) 90+4'	Stadium: Nizhny Novgorod Stadium; Attendance: 3,115; Referee: Vasiliy Kazartsev

7 March 2022 20	Krasnodar	2 – 1	Ural Yekaterinburg	Krasnodar
16:00 YEKT (UTC+5)	Spertsyan 59' (pen.); Ilyin 65'; Sorokin (yellow card) 86'	Report	Gerasimov (yellow card) 75'; Bicfalvi 79'	Stadium: Krasnodar Stadium; Attendance: 6,230; Referee: Evgeny Turbin

13 March 2022 21	Ural Yekaterinburg	0 – 0	Akhmat Grozny	Yekaterinburg
14:00 YEKT (UTC+5)	Miškić (yellow card) 44'	Report		Stadium: Central Stadium; Attendance: 3,572; Referee: Sergei Karasev

19 March 2022 22	Ural Yekaterinburg	0 – 1	Khimki	Yekaterinburg
18:30 YEKT (UTC+5)	Gerasimov (yellow card) 46'	Report	Kamyshev (yellow card) 60'; Mirzov (yellow card) 81'; Kuzmichyov 86' (o.g.)	Stadium: Central Stadium; Attendance: 5,273; Referee: Vladimir Moskalyov

3 April 2022 23	CSKA Moscow	2 – 2	Ural Yekaterinburg	Moscow
18:30 YEKT (UTC+5)	Diveyev 3'; Gbamin (yellow card) 66'; Yazıcı 90+'	Report	Kuzmichyov (yellow card) 3'; Bijol 7' (o.g.); Yegorychev (yellow card) 36'; Bicfalvi 55'	Stadium: VEB Arena; Attendance: 9,588; Referee: Igor Panin

10 April 2022 24	Ural Yekaterinburg	0 – 1	Krylia Sovetov	Yekaterinburg
14:00 YEKT (UTC+5)	Gerasimov (yellow card) 3' (yellow-red card) 84'; Magomadov (yellow card) 28'; Shatov (yellow card) 39'; Augustyniak (yellow card) 57'; Miškić (yellow card) 65'	Report	Bijl (yellow card) 23'; Zinkovsky 53'; Sarveli (yellow card) 76'	Stadium: Central Stadium; Attendance: 11,527; Referee: Kirill Levnikov

16 April 2022 25	Zenit St.Petersburg	3 – 1	Ural Yekaterinburg	Saint Petersburg
18:30 YEKT (UTC+5)	Claudinho (penalty missed) 12' 12'; Krugovoy (yellow card) 27'; Alberto 37'; Kuzyayev (yellow card) 51'; Malcom (yellow card) 53'; Chistyakov (yellow card) 72'; Dzyuba 73'	Report	Kuzmichyov (yellow card) 11'; Magomadov (yellow card) 17'; Yegorychev (yellow card) 45'; Bicfalvi (yellow card) 66'; Zheleznov 83'	Stadium: Krestovsky Stadium; Attendance: 36,787; Referee: Vitali Meshkov

23 April 2022 26	Ural Yekaterinburg	2 – 1	Ufa	Yekaterinburg
16:00 YEKT (UTC+5)	Miškić (yellow card) 13' (goal) 53'; Bicfalvi 25'; Podberyozkin (yellow card) 56'; Yemelyanov (yellow card) 82'; Ageyev (yellow card) 90+'	Report	Jokić (yellow card) 68'; Agalarov 80'	Stadium: Central Stadium; Attendance: 10,172; Referee: Sergey Ivanov

30 April 2022 27	Dynamo Moscow	2 – 3	Ural Yekaterinburg	Moscow
16:00 YEKT (UTC+5)	Zakharyan 7'; N'Jie 80'; Skopintsev (yellow card) 80'	Report	Bicfalvi 10', 67'; Miškić 31'; Augustyniak (yellow card) 76'; Goglichidze (yellow card) 90+'	Stadium: VTB Arena; Attendance: 15,381; Referee: Pavel Kukuyan

7 May 2022 28	Ural Yekaterinburg	1 – 3	Spartak Moscow	Yekaterinburg
16:00 YEKT (UTC+5)	Goglichidze 55'	Report	Nicholson 11', 26'; Moses 30'	Stadium: Central Stadium; Attendance: 26,402; Referee: Vladimir Moskalyov

15 May 2022 29	Ural Yekaterinburg	3 – 0	Rubin Kazan	Yekaterinburg
16:00 YEKT (UTC+5)	Bicfalvi 22', 71'; Shatov 56'	Report	Kuchayev (yellow card) 24'; Kuznetsov (yellow card) 65'; Samoshnikov (yellow card) 76'	Stadium: Central Stadium; Attendance: 14,287; Referee: Sergei Karasev

21 May 2022 30	Arsenal Tula	1 – 2	Ural Yekaterinburg	Tula
19:00 YEKT (UTC+5)	Markov (red card) 30'; Kaynov 42'	Report	Augustyniak 31' (pen.); Miškić 33'	Stadium: Arsenal Stadium; Attendance: 3,578; Referee: Pavel Kukuyan

=== Russian Cup ===
==== Round of 32 ====
Pos	Team	Pld	W	D	L	GF	GA	GD	Pts	Qualification
1	KAMAZ (Q)	2	2	0	0	2	0	+2	6	Advance to Play-off
2	Ural	2	1	0	1	2	1	+1	3	
3	Torpedo Vladimir	2	0	0	2	0	3	−3	0	

Rules for classification: 1) Points; 2) Wins; 3) Goal differential; 4) Goals scored; 5) Head-to-head result; 6) Disciplinary points.
(Q) Qualified for the phase indicated

23 September 2021 2	Torpedo Vladimir	0–2	Ural Yekaterinburg	Vladimir
20:00 YEKT (UTC+5)	D.Kalabukhov (yellow card) 23'; V.Pobedimov (yellow card) 53'; Andreyev (yellow card) 54'	Report	Yegorychev 1'; Panyukov 16'; Podberyozkin (yellow card) 50'; Maksimenko (yellow card) 61'	Stadium: Torpedo Stadium; Referee: Yaroslav Khromey

27 October 2021 3	KAMAZ	1–0	Ural Yekaterinburg	Naberezhnye Chelny
20:00 YEKT (UTC+5)	Gagloyev (yellow card) 44'; Ayukin (yellow card) 54'; Osmanov (yellow card) 80'; Musayev 90'	Report	Mamin (yellow card) 56'	Stadium: KAMAZ Stadium; Referee: Aleksandr Mashlyakevich

== Squad statistics ==
As of match played 21 May 2022

=== Appearances and goals ===
No.	Pos	Nat	Player	Total		Premier League		Russian Cup	
No.	Pos	Nat	Player	Apps	Goals	Apps	Goals	Apps	Goals
1	GK	(Russia) RUS	Ilya Pomazun	27	0	26	0	1	0
3	DF	(Russia) RUS	Leo Goglichidze	23	1	20+1	1	2	0
5	MF	(Russia) RUS	Andrei Yegorychev	31	2	29	1	1+1	1
6	MF	(Poland) POL	Rafał Augustyniak	27	3	25+1	3	0+1	0
7	MF	(Russia) RUS	Aleksandr Yushin	6	0	1+5	0	0	0
8	MF	(Russia) RUS	Roman Yemelyanov	2	0	0+2	0	0	0
9	FW	(Russia) RUS	Mikhail Ageyev	13	0	1+10	0	1+1	0
10	MF	(Romania) ROU	Eric Bicfalvi	29	10	28	10	0+1	0
11	MF	(Russia) RUS	Ramazan Gadzhimuradov	26	2	16+8	2	1+1	0
13	GK	(Russia) RUS	Dmitry Landakov	1	0	1	0	0	0
14	MF	(Russia) RUS	Yuri Zheleznov	23	2	7+14	2	1+1	0
16	MF	(Russia) RUS	Dmitry Makovsky	1	0	0+1	0	0	0
19	MF	(Croatia) CRO	Danijel Miškić	21	3	17+4	3	0	0
21	MF	(Russia) RUS	Vyacheslav Podberyozkin	23	0	8+13	0	2	0
24	MF	(Russia) RUS	Kirill Kolesnichenko	19	0	15+3	0	0+1	0
25	DF	(Russia) RUS	Ivan Kuzmichyov	24	0	23	0	1	0
27	MF	(Russia) RUS	Oleg Shatov	11	1	9+2	1	0	0
29	DF	(Russia) RUS	Artyom Mamin	14	0	13	0	1	0
30	MF	(Russia) RUS	Aleksey Yevseyev	10	0	0+10	0	0	0
93	DF	(Russia) RUS	Aleksey Gerasimov	24	0	22+1	0	1	0
95	DF	(Russia) RUS	Chingiz Magomadov	7	0	6+1	0	0	0
Players who suspended their contracts:
15	DF	(Ukraine) UKR	Denys Kulakov	19	0	18	0	0+1	0
Players away from the club on loan:
20	FW	(Russia) RUS	Andrei Panyukov	7	2	5+1	1	1	1
55	FW	(Russia) RUS	Artyom Maksimenko	9	1	0+8	1	0+1	0
98	DF	(Russia) RUS	Islamzhan Nasyrov	1	0	0+1	0	0	0
Players who appeared for Ural Yekaterinburg but left during the season:
4	DF	(Russia) RUS	Vladimir Rykov	5	0	4	0	1	0
17	FW	(Kosovo) KOS	Ylldren Ibrahimaj	4	0	2+1	0	1	0
18	MF	(Serbia) SRB	Branko Jovičić	13	0	10+1	0	2	0
31	GK	(Ukraine) UKR	Yaroslav Hodzyur	4	0	3	0	1	0
34	MF	(Georgia (country)) GEO	Luka Gagnidze	13	0	4+7	0	2	0
95	DF	(Russia) RUS	Arsen Adamov	19	1	17	1	2	0

=== Goal scorers ===
Place	Position	Nation	Number	Name	Premier League	Russian Cup	Total
1	MF	(Romania)	10	Eric Bicfalvi	10	0	10
2	MF	(Poland)	6	Rafał Augustyniak	3	0	3
2	MF	(Croatia)	19	Danijel Miškić	3	0	3
4	MF	(Russia)	11	Ramazan Gadzhimuradov	2	0	2
4	MF	(Russia)	14	Yuri Zheleznov	2	0	2
4	FW	(Russia)	20	Andrei Panyukov	1	1	2
4	MF	(Russia)	5	Andrei Yegorychev	1	1	2
8	FW	(Russia)	55	Artyom Maksimenko	1	0	1
8	DF	(Russia)	95	Arsen Adamov	1	0	1
8	DF	(Russia)	3	Leo Goglichidze	1	0	1
8	MF	(Russia)	27	Oleg Shatov	1	0	1
8				Own goal	1	0	1
Total					27	2	29

=== Clean sheets ===
Place	Position	Nation	Number	Name	Premier League	Russian Cup	Total
1	GK	(Russia)	1	Ilya Pomazun	8	1	9
Total					8	1	9

=== Disciplinary record ===
Number	Nation	Position	Name	Premier League		Russian Cup		Total	
Number	Nation	Position	Name	Yellow card	Red card	Yellow card	Red card	Yellow card	Red card
1	(Russia)	GK	Ilya Pomazun	2	0	0	0	2	0
3	(Russia)	DF	Leo Goglichidze	2	1	0	0	2	1
5	(Russia)	MF	Andrei Yegorychev	6	0	0	0	6	0
6	(Poland)	MF	Rafał Augustyniak	3	0	0	0	3	0
8	(Russia)	MF	Roman Yemelyanov	1	0	0	0	1	0
9	(Russia)	FW	Mikhail Ageyev	1	0	0	0	1	0
10	(Romania)	MF	Eric Bicfalvi	7	1	0	0	7	1
11	(Russia)	MF	Ramazan Gadzhimuradov	2	0	0	0	2	0
14	(Russia)	MF	Yuri Zheleznov	1	0	0	0	1	0
19	(Croatia)	MF	Danijel Miškić	6	0	0	0	6	0
21	(Russia)	MF	Vyacheslav Podberyozkin	1	0	1	0	2	0
24	(Russia)	MF	Kirill Kolesnichenko	4	1	0	0	4	1
25	(Russia)	MF	Ivan Kuzmichyov	5	0	0	0	5	0
27	(Russia)	MF	Oleg Shatov	1	0	0	0	1	0
29	(Russia)	DF	Artyom Mamin	2	0	1	0	3	0
30	(Russia)	MF	Aleksey Yevseyev	1	0	0	0	1	0
93	(Russia)	DF	Aleksey Gerasimov	10	1	0	0	10	1
95	(Russia)	DF	Chingiz Magomadov	2	0	0	0	2	0
Players away on loan:
55	(Russia)	FW	Artyom Maksimenko	0	0	1	0	1	0
Players who left Ural Yekaterinburg during the season:
4	(Russia)	DF	Vladimir Rykov	1	0	0	0	1	0
17	(Kosovo)	FW	Ylldren Ibrahimaj	1	0	0	0	1	0
18	(Serbia)	MF	Branko Jovičić	2	0	0	0	2	0
31	(Ukraine)	GK	Yaroslav Hodzyur	1	0	0	0	1	0
34	(Georgia (country))	MF	Luka Gagnidze	2	0	0	0	2	0
95	(Russia)	DF	Arsen Adamov	2	0	0	0	2	0
Total				66	4	3	0	69	4
