= 2020–21 FC Ural Yekaterinburg season =

FC Ural Yekaterinburg
2020–21 season
- Chairman: Grigori Ivanov
- Manager: Yuri Matveyev
- Stadium: Central Stadium
- Premier League: 12th
- Russian Cup: Round of 16 vs Ufa
- Top goalscorer: League: Eric Bicfalvi (7); All: Eric Bicfalvi (10)
- Highest home attendance: 15,102 vs CSKA Moscow (3 October 2020)
- Lowest home attendance: 2,058 vs Sochi (29 November 2020)
- Average home league attendance: 7,486 (2 May 2021)
Home colours	Away colours	Third colours

The 2020–21 FC Ural Yekaterinburg season was Ural's club's eighth successive season in the Russian Premier League, the highest tier of association football in Russia. Ural Yekaterinburg finished the season in 12th position, and where knocked out of the Russian Cup at the Round of 16 stage by Ufa.

== Season events ==
On 28 July, Ural extended their loan deal with Ihor Kalinin for another season, and extended their contract with Yuri Bavin.

On 5 August, Ilya Pomazun joined Ural on loan for the season from CSKA Moscow.

On 1 September, Stefan Strandberg returned to Ural after leaving Trapani. The following day, Ural announced the signing of Branko Jovičić from Red Star Belgrade.

On 16 October, Ural re-signed Pavel Pogrebnyak.

== Squad ==
Note: Flags indicate national team as defined under FIFA eligibility rules; some limited exceptions apply. Players may hold more than one non-FIFA nationality.

No.	Pos.	Nation	Player
4	DF	NOR	Stefan Strandberg
5	MF	RUS	Andrei Yegorychev
6	MF	POL	Rafał Augustyniak
8	MF	RUS	Roman Yemelyanov
9	FW	RUS	Pavel Pogrebnyak
10	MF	ROU	Eric Bicfalvi
13	DF	RUS	Ihor Kalinin (on loan from Dynamo Moscow)
15	DF	UKR	Denys Kulakov
17	FW	KOS	Ylldren Ibrahimaj
18	MF	SRB	Branko Jovičić
19	MF	CRO	Danijel Miškić
20	FW	RUS	Andrei Panyukov
21	MF	RUS	Vyacheslav Podberyozkin
22	DF	RUS	Arsen Adamov

No.	Pos.	Nation	Player
25	DF	RUS	Ivan Kuzmichyov
28	GK	RUS	Ivan Konovalov (on loan from Rubin Kazan)
30	MF	RUS	Alexey Yevseyev
31	GK	RUS	Yaroslav Hodzyur
40	DF	RUS	Ramazan Gadzhimuradov
44	DF	RUS	Vladimir Rykov
55	FW	RUS	Artyom Maksimenko
58	MF	NED	Othman El Kabir
77	GK	RUS	Oleg Baklov
93	DF	RUS	Aleksei Gerasimov
95	MF	RUS	Chingiz Magomadov
98	DF	RUS	Islamzhan Nasyrov
99	FW	RUS	Yevgeni Tatarinov

=== Out on loan ===
Note: Flags indicate national team as defined under FIFA eligibility rules; some limited exceptions apply. Players may hold more than one non-FIFA nationality.

No.	Pos.	Nation	Player
14	MF	RUS	Yuri Bavin (at Tambov)
69	MF	RUS	Artyom Shabolin (at Yenisey Krasnoyarsk)
—	GK	RUS	Aleksei Mamin (at KAMAZ Naberezhnye Chelny)
—	GK	RUS	Vladislav Poletayev (at Irtysh Omsk)

No.	Pos.	Nation	Player
—	DF	RUS	Artyom Mamin (at Orenburg)
—	DF	SRB	Dominik Dinga (at Dinamo Minsk)
—	FW	RUS	Artyom Yusupov (at Volgar Astrakhan)

== Transfers ==
=== In ===
Date	Position	Nationality	Name	From	Fee	Ref.
13 August 2020	MF	(Croatia)	Danijel Miškić	Orenburg	Undisclosed	
14 August 2020	DF	(Russia)	Vladimir Rykov	Dynamo Moscow	Free	
18 August 2020	MF	(Russia)	Vyacheslav Podberyozkin	Rubin Kazan	Undisclosed	
25 August 2020	MF	(Russia)	Alexey Yevseyev	Rotor Volgograd	Undisclosed	
1 September 2020	DF	(Norway)	Stefan Strandberg	Trapani	Undisclosed	
2 September 2020	MF	(Serbia)	Branko Jovičić	Red Star Belgrade	Undisclosed	
16 October 2020	FW	(Russia)	Pavel Pogrebnyak	Ural Yekaterinburg	Free	
15 January 2021	DF	(Russia)	Arsen Adamov	Akhmat Grozny	Undisclosed	
15 January 2021	MF	(Russia)	Ramazan Gadzhimuradov	SKA-Khabarovsk	Undisclosed	
15 January 2021	FW	(Russia)	Artyom Maksimenko	Veles Moscow	Undisclosed	
16 January 2021	FW	(Kosovo)	Ylldren Ibrahimaj	Viking	Free	

=== Loans in ===
Date from	Position	Nationality	Name	From	Date to	Ref.
21 February 2020	DF	(Russia)	Ihor Kalinin	Ural Yekaterinburg	End of season	
5 August 2020	GK	(Russia)	Ilya Pomazun	CSKA Moscow	25 February 2021	
25 February 2021	GK	(Russia)	Ivan Konovalov	Rubin Kazan	End of season	

=== Out ===
Date	Position	Nationality	Name	To	Fee	Ref.
21 February 2021	MF	(Russia)	Dmitry Yefremov	Krylia Sovetov	Undisclosed	
28 February 2021	FW	(Russia)	David Karayev	Caspiy	Undisclosed	

=== Loans out ===
Date from	Position	Nationality	Name	To	Date to	Ref.
Summer 2020	GK	(Russia)	Aleksei Mamin	KAMAZ Naberezhnye Chelny	End of season	
14 August 2020	DF	(Russia)	Artyom Mamin	Orenburg	End of season	
14 August 2020	DF	(Russia)	Islamzhan Nasyrov	Orenburg	21 January 2021	
20 August 2020	FW	(Russia)	Artyom Yusupov	Orenburg	21 January 2021	
12 October 2020	GK	(Russia)	Vladislav Poletayev	Irtysh Omsk	End of season	
27 January 2021	FW	(Russia)	Artyom Yusupov	Volgar Astrakhan	End of season	
19 February 2021	MF	(Russia)	Artyom Shabolin	Yenisey Krasnoyarsk	End of season	
25 February 2021	MF	(Russia)	Yuri Bavin	Tambov	End of season	

=== Released ===
Date	Position	Nationality	Name	Joined	Date	Ref
3 August 2020	MF	(Cameroon)	Petrus Boumal	BB Erzurumspor		
22 September 2020	DF	(Armenia)	Varazdat Haroyan	Tambov	6 October 2020	
23 September 2020	MF	(Switzerland)	Marco Aratore	Aarau	28 September 2020	
18 January 2021	DF	(Belarus)	Nikolay Zolotov	Kolos Kovalivka	5 February 2021	
18 January 2021	DF	(Russia)	Shamsiddin Shanbiyev	Isloch Minsk Raion	15 February 2021	

== Friendlies ==
24 January 2021	Ural Yekaterinburg (Russia)	2 – 1	(United Arab Emirates) Liwa	Sharjah, United Arab Emirates
YEKT (UTC+5)	Trialist 49'; Gadzhimuradov 60'	Report	Goal

27 January 2021	Ural Yekaterinburg	2 – 3	Zenit St.Petersburg	Dubai, United Arab Emirates
11:00 MSK (UTC+3)	Malcom 43'; Azmoun 49'; Wendel 57'	Report	Yegorychev 37', 46'	Stadium: Nad Al Sheba Stadium; Referee: Ivan Mladenovic (Serbia)

30 January 2021	Ural Yekaterinburg (Russia)	2 – 0	Ararat-Armenia	Sharjah, United Arab Emirates
17:00 YEKT (UTC+5)	Bicfalvi 40'; Magomadov 49'	Report

== Competitions ==
=== Overview ===
Competition	First match	Last match	Starting round	Final position	Record							
Competition	First match	Last match	Starting round	Final position	Pld	W	D	L	GF	GA	GD	Win %
Premier League	10 August 2020	May 2021	Matchday 1		30	7	13	10	26	36	−10	23.33
Russian Cup	16 September 2020		Round of 32	Round of 16	3	2	0	1	6	4	+2	66.67
Total					33	9	13	11	32	40	−8	27.27

Last updated: 16 May 2021
Source: Competitions

=== Premier League ===
==== Results summary ====
Overall								Home						Away					
Pld	W	D	L	GF	GA	GD	Pts	W	D	L	GF	GA	GD	W	D	L	GF	GA	GD
30	7	13	10	24	34	−10	34	6	6	3	14	11	+3	1	7	7	10	23	−13

Last updated: 16 May 2021.
Source: See Results

==== Results by round ====
Round	1	2	3	4	5	6	7	8	9	10	11	12	13	14	15	16	17	18	19	20	21	22	23	24	25	26	27	28	29	30
Ground	H	A	H	H	A	A	H	A	H	H	A	H	A	H	A	H	A	A	A	A	H	H	A	H	A	H	H	A	H	A
Result	L	D	D	W	L	D	W	D	L	L	L	D	W	D	D	W	L	D	D	D	D	W	L	W	D	L	D	L	W	L
Position	13	13	12	11	12	11	10	11	11	11	13	13	11	11	11	11	11	12	12	12	12	12	12	12	12	12	12	12	12	12

Updated to match(es) played on 16 May 2021. Source: Premier Liga
A = Away; H = Home; W = Win; D = Draw; L = Loss

==== Results ====
10 August 2020 1	Ural Yekaterinburg	0 – 2	Dynamo Moscow	Yekaterinburg
19:00 YEKT (UTC+5)	Yegorychev (yellow card) 22'; Haroyan (yellow card) 77'; Aratore (yellow card) 90+4'	Report	N'Jie 38'; Parshivlyuk (yellow card) 48'; Igboun 59'; Philipp (yellow card) 72'; Slepov (yellow card) 90+1'	Stadium: Central Stadium; Attendance: 3,420; Referee: Vitaly Meshkov

15 August 2020 2	Rubin Kazan	1 – 1	Ural Yekaterinburg	Kazan
17:30 YEKT (UTC+5)	Merkulov (yellow card) 21' (yellow-red card) 31'; Ignatyev 35' (pen.)	Report	Bicfalvi 12' (pen.); Yemelyanov (yellow card) 33' (yellow-red card) 63'; Aratore (yellow card) 45'; Kulakov (yellow card) 48'; Rykov (yellow card) 51'; Hodzyur (yellow card) 88'; Miškić (yellow card) 90'	Stadium: Ak Bars Arena; Attendance: 4,088; Referee: Alexey Sukhoi

19 August 2020 3	Ural Yekaterinburg	1 – 1	Lokomotiv Moscow	Yekaterinburg
20:00 YEKT (UTC+5)	Podberyozkin (yellow card) 29'; Panyukov (yellow card) 30'; Bicfalvi (yellow card) 49'; Yegorychev 74'; Pomazun (yellow card) 90+2'	Report	Barinov (yellow card) 29'; Rybus (yellow card) 81'; Smolov 87'	Stadium: Central Stadium; Attendance: 5,072; Referee: Aleksei Matyunin

22 August 2020 4	Ural Yekaterinburg	1 – 0	Krasnodar	Yekaterinburg
16:00 YEKT (UTC+5)	Podberyozkin 3'; Yefremov (yellow card) 86'; Pomazun (yellow card) 90+'	Report	Kaio (yellow card) 23' (yellow-red card) 54'; Utkin (yellow card) 57'; Olsson (yellow card) 57'; Claesson (yellow card) 61'; Gazinsky (yellow card) 69'	Stadium: Central Stadium; Attendance: 5,816; Referee: Evgeny Turbin

26 August 2020 5	Rostov	1 – 0	Ural Yekaterinburg	Rostov-on-Don
22:30 YEKT (UTC+5)	Hashimoto 59'	Report	Kulakov (yellow card) 52'; Rykov (yellow card) 90+2'	Stadium: Rostov Arena; Attendance: 11,353; Referee: Sergey Lapochkin

30 August 2020 6	Sochi	0 – 0	Ural Yekaterinburg	Sochi
22:00 YEKT (UTC+5)	Terekhov (yellow card) 50'	Report	Yevseyev (yellow card) 79'	Stadium: Fisht Olympic Stadium; Attendance: 3,942; Referee: Mikhail Vilkov

12 September 2020 7	Ural Yekaterinburg	3 – 1	Khimki	Yekaterinburg
20:30 YEKT (UTC+5)	Bicfalvi 15' (pen.), 67' (yellow card) 62'; Strandberg 23'	Report	Dyadyun (yellow card) 12'; Koryan 52'; Kuat (yellow card) 61'; Murnin (yellow card) 71'	Stadium: Central Stadium; Attendance: 6,037; Referee: Vladimir Moskalyov

19 September 2020 8	Ural Yekaterinburg	1 – 1	Zenit St.Petersburg	Yekaterinburg
18:30 YEKT (UTC+5)	Miškić (yellow card) 19'; Zolotov (yellow card) 40'; Panyukov 69'	Report	Dzyuba 4'; Ozdoyev (yellow card) 44'	Stadium: Central Stadium; Attendance: 13,488; Referee: Sergei Karasev

27 September 2020 9	Akhmat Grozny	2 – 0	Ural Yekaterinburg	Grozny
18:30 YEKT (UTC+5)	Melkadze 2'; Kharin (yellow card) 31'; Ilyin (penalty missed) 39'; Berisha (yellow card) 42' (goal) 57' (pen.); Nenakhov (yellow card) 46'; Sadulayev (yellow card) 78'; Karmayev (yellow card) 86'; Shvets (yellow card) 90'	Report	Strandberg (yellow card) 24' (yellow-red card) 38'; Rykov (yellow card) 64'	Stadium: Akhmat-Arena; Attendance: 4,961; Referee: Pavel Kukuyan

3 October 2020 10	Ural Yekaterinburg	0 – 2	CSKA Moscow	Yekaterinburg
19:30 YEKT (UTC+5)	Yemelyanov (yellow card) 40'; Kalinin (yellow card) 81'	Report	Magnússon (red card) 49'; Zaynutdinov 52'; Maradishvili 56' (yellow card) 79'; Oblyakov (yellow card) 72'; Tiknizyan (yellow card) 80'	Stadium: Central Stadium; Attendance: 15,102; Referee: Stanislav Vasiliev

18 October 2020 11	Arsenal Tula	1 – 0	Ural Yekaterinburg	Tula
16:00 YEKT (UTC+5)	Lomovitsky (yellow card) 28' (goal) 36'; Panchenko (yellow card) 39'; Bauer (yellow card) 81'	Report	Strandberg (yellow card) 14'; Miškić (yellow card) 56'; Kalinin (yellow card) 67'; Yemelyanov (yellow card) 90'	Stadium: Arsenal Stadium; Attendance: 4,230; Referee: Sergey Lapochkin

25 October 2020 12	Ural Yekaterinburg	0 – 0	Tambov	Yekaterinburg
14:00 YEKT (UTC+5)	Pogrebnyak (yellow card) 15'; Podberyozkin (yellow card) 27'; Jovičić (yellow card) 40'; Zolotov (yellow card) 76'; Rykov (yellow card) 81'; Miškić (yellow card) 90+'	Report	Kapliyenko (yellow card) 45+'; Ciupercă (yellow card) 54'; Ryzhikov (yellow card) 90+'; Onugkha (yellow card) 90+'	Stadium: Central Stadium; Attendance: 3,427; Referee: Evgeny Kukulyak

1 November 2020 13	Ufa	1 – 2	Ural Yekaterinburg	Ufa
14:00 YEKT (UTC+5)	Andrić (yellow card) 28' (goal) 62'; Carp (yellow card) 37'; Golubev (yellow card) 55'; Nikitin (yellow card) 79'	Report	Bicfalvi 27', 39' (pen.); Augustyniak (yellow card) 35'; Bavin (yellow card) 73'; Podberyozkin (yellow card) 90+'	Stadium: Neftyanik Stadium; Attendance: 2,569; Referee: Vladimir Moskalev

7 November 2020 14	Ural Yekaterinburg	2 – 2	Spartak Moscow	Yekaterinburg
16:00 YEKT (UTC+5)	Pogrebnyak 11'; El Kabir (yellow card) 44'; Rykov (yellow card) 45'; Zolotov (yellow card) 53'; Augustyniak 60'	Report	Sobolev 6', 45+' (pen.); Moses (yellow card) 34'; Ayrton (yellow card) 86'; Gigot (yellow card) 89'	Stadium: Central Stadium; Attendance: 9,669; Referee: Pavel Kukuyan

22 November 2020 15	Rotor Volgograd	1 – 1	Ural Yekaterinburg	Volgograd
18:30 YEKT (UTC+5)	Stepanov (yellow card) 32'; Kozhemyakin (yellow card) 37'; Davitashvili (yellow card) 62'; Zhigulyov (yellow card) 78'	Report	Bicfalvi (yellow card) 28'; Kalinin (yellow card) 44'; Jovičić (yellow card) 55'; Augustyniak (yellow card) 90+'	Stadium: Volgograd Arena; Attendance: 4,050; Referee: Vladimir Moskalyov

29 November 2020 16	Ural Yekaterinburg	1 – 0	Sochi	Yekaterinburg
14:00 YEKT (UTC+5)	Kalinin (yellow card) 1'; Rykov (yellow card) 7'; Yevseyev 86'; Pomazun (yellow card) 90+'	Report	Terekhov (yellow card) 20' (yellow-red card) 45+'; Burmistrov (yellow card) 22'; Zabolotny (yellow card) 90+'	Stadium: Central Stadium; Attendance: 2,058; Referee: Stanislav Vasiliev

5 December 2020 17	Zenit St.Petersburg	5 – 1	Ural Yekaterinburg	Saint Petersburg
21:00 YEKT (UTC+5)	Azmoun 17', 22', 76' (pen.); Dzyuba 30' (pen.); Douglas 45'	Report	Augustyniak (yellow card) 32'; Magomadov (yellow card) 75'; Shabolin 82'	Stadium: Krestovsky Stadium; Attendance: 1,184; Referee: Igor Panin

13 December 2020 18	CSKA Moscow	2 – 2	Ural Yekaterinburg	Moscow
19:00 YEKT (UTC+5)	Zaynutdinov (yellow card) 5'; Shkurin 12' (red card) 90+'; Vlašić 61' (pen.); Fernandes (yellow card) 76'; Dzagoev (yellow card) 78'; Bistrović (yellow card) 88'; Oblyakov (yellow card) 90+'	Report	Yegorychev (yellow card) 16' (goal) 31'; Kalinin (yellow card) 22' (goal) 90'; Pogrebnyak (yellow card) 47' (yellow-red card) 47'	Stadium: VEB Arena; Attendance: 4,315; Referee: Alexey Sukhoi

18 December 2020 19	Tambov	1 – 1	Ural Yekaterinburg	Saransk
20:00 YEKT (UTC+5)	Ciupercă (yellow card) 9'; Kostyukov (yellow card) 15'; Onugkha 45'; Kabakhidze (yellow card) 46'; Haroyan (yellow card) 59'	Report	El Kabir 29' (penalty missed) 61'; Yegorychev (yellow card) 45+'; Gerasimov (yellow card) 47'	Stadium: Mordovia Arena; Referee: Sergey Ivanov
Note: Match played at the Mordovia Arena in Saransk instead of Tambov's regular Spartak Stadium.

28 February 2021 20	Krasnodar	2 – 2	Ural Yekaterinburg	Krasnodar
21:00 YEKT (UTC+5)	Suleymanov 12'; Smolnikov (yellow card) 26' (yellow-red card) 35'; Cabella 85'	Report	Jovičić (yellow card) 4'; Rykov (yellow card) 48'; Augustyniak 52', 59'	Stadium: Krasnodar Stadium; Attendance: 7,034; Referee: Sergei Karasev

7 March 2021 21	Ural Yekaterinburg	0 – 0	Ufa	Yekaterinburg
16:00 YEKT (UTC+5)	Rykov (yellow card) 57'; Gadzhimuradov (yellow card) 73'; Kulakov (yellow card) 90+'	Report	Bizoza (red card) 14'; Sukhov (yellow card) 61'; Mrzljak (yellow card) 83'	Stadium: Central Stadium; Attendance: 4,575; Referee: Sergey Lapochkin

13 March 2021 22	Ural Yekaterinburg	1 – 0	Rotor Volgograd	Yekaterinburg
14:00 YEKT (UTC+5)	Bicfalvi 84'	Report		Stadium: Central Stadium; Attendance: 3,717; Referee: Mikhail Vilkov

18 March 2021 23	Spartak Moscow	5 – 1	Ural Yekaterinburg	Moscow
19:00 YEKT (UTC+5)	Larsson 12', 47' (yellow card) 84'; Promes 26'; Sobolev 45+' (pen.), 90+' (pen.); Gigot (yellow card) 74'; Kutepov (yellow card) 76'; Ayrton (yellow card) 86'	Report	Bicfalvi 55' (pen.); Gerasimov (yellow card) 56'; Konovalov (yellow card) 84'; Strandberg (yellow card) 90+'	Stadium: Otkritie Arena; Attendance: 10,170; Referee: Vladimir Moskalyov

4 April 2021 24	Ural Yekaterinburg	2 – 0	Arsenal Tula	Yekaterinburg
16:00 YEKT (UTC+5)	Kalinin (yellow card) 2'; Pogrebnyak 13' (yellow card) 55'; Gadzhimuradov 85' (yellow card) 90+'	Report	Panteleyev (penalty missed) 3' (yellow card) 40'; Lutsenko (yellow card) 17'; Khagush (yellow card) 34'; Konovalov (yellow card) 82'; Lomovitsky (yellow card) 90+'	Stadium: Central Stadium; Attendance: 7,526; Referee: Sergey Ivanov

11 April 2021 25	Dynamo Moscow	2 – 2	Ural Yekaterinburg	Moscow
16:30 YEKT (UTC+5)	Grulyov (yellow card) 32'; Szymański (yellow card) 44' (yellow-red card) 56'; Ordets 48' (yellow card) 84'; Zakharyan (yellow card) 65' (goal) 71'; Varela (yellow card) 84'; Neustädter (yellow card) 90'	Report	Jovičić (yellow card) 28'; Pogrebnyak 43', 75'; Yegorychev (yellow card) 82'; Augustyniak (yellow card) 87'	Stadium: VTB Arena; Attendance: 10,058; Referee: Igor Panin

18 April 2021 26	Ural Yekaterinburg	0 – 1	Rubin Kazan	Yekaterinburg
14:00 YEKT (UTC+5)	Yegorychev (yellow card) 25'; Gadzhimuradov (yellow card) 53'; Panyukov (penalty missed) 83'	Report	Zuyev (yellow card) 21'; Makarov (yellow card) 34' (yellow-red card) 83'; Jevtić 45'; Bakayev (yellow card) 56'; Abildgaard (yellow card) 64'; Samoshnikov (yellow card) 68'; Dyupin (yellow card) 90+'	Stadium: Central Stadium; Attendance: 10,739; Referee: Artyom Lyubimov

24 April 2021 27	Ural Yekaterinburg	1 – 1	Akhmat Grozny	Yekaterinburg
16:00 YEKT (UTC+5)	Yegorychev (yellow card) 39'; Augustyniak 58'	Report	Sadulayev 11'; Timofeyev (yellow card) 22'; Berisha (yellow card) 25'; Shvets (yellow card) 77'	Stadium: Central Stadium; Attendance: 8,697; Referee: Ivan Sidenkov

2 May 2021 28	Khimki	1 – 0	Ural Yekaterinburg	Khimki
16:00 YEKT (UTC+5)	Konaté 10'; Troshechkin (red card) 15'; Danilkin (yellow card) 31'	Report	Bicfalvi (yellow card) 78'; Yevseyev (yellow card) 82'; Ibrahimaj (yellow card) 85'	Stadium: Arena Khimki; Attendance: 1,505; Referee: Vladimir Moskalyov

10 May 2021 29	Ural Yekaterinburg	1 – 0	Rostov	Yekaterinburg
18:30 YEKT (UTC+5)	Gadzhimuradov 37'; Pogrebnyak (yellow card) 69'	Report	Hadžikadunić (yellow card) 40'; Aleesami (yellow card) 84'; Hashimoto (yellow card) 90+'	Stadium: Central Stadium; Attendance: 12,948; Referee: Pavel Shadykhanov

16 May 2021 30	Lokomotiv Moscow	1 – 0	Ural Yekaterinburg	Moscow
16:00 YEKT (UTC+5)	Guilherme (yellow card) 4'; Zhemaletdinov (yellow card) 45'; Rybchinsky 89'	Report	Adamov (yellow card) 4'; Augustyniak (yellow card) 16' (yellow-red card) 27'; Jovičić (yellow card) 36'; Hodzyur (yellow card) 69'; Miškić (yellow card) 72' (yellow-red card) 75'; Kalinin (yellow card) 76'	Stadium: RZD Arena; Attendance: 11,774; Referee: Vladislav Bezborodov

==== League table ====
Pos	Team	Pld	W	D	L	GF	GA	GD	Pts
10	Krasnodar	30	12	5	13	52	45	+7	41
11	Akhmat Grozny	30	11	7	12	36	38	−2	40
12	Ural Yekaterinburg	30	7	13	10	26	36	−10	34
13	Ufa	30	6	7	17	26	46	−20	25
14	Arsenal Tula	30	6	5	19	28	51	−23	23

Source: Premier Liga
Rules for classification: 1) Points; 2) Head-to-head points; 3) Head-to-head matches won; 4) Head-to-head goal difference; 5) Head-to-head goals scored; 6) Matches won; 7) Goal difference; 8) Goals scored; 9) Play-off.

=== Russian Cup ===
==== Round of 32 ====
Pos	Team	Pld	W	D	L	GF	GA	GD	Pts	Qualification
1	Ural (Q)	2	2	0	0	6	1	+5	6	Advance to Play-off
2	Veles Moscow (E)	2	1	0	1	5	5	0	3	
3	Volga Ulyanovsk (E)	2	0	0	2	2	7	−5	0	

(E) Eliminated; (Q) Qualified for the phase indicated

16 September 2020 1	Volga Ulyanovsk	0 – 3	Ural Yekaterinburg	Ulyanovsk
19:00 YEKT (UTC+5)	Klopkov (yellow card) 16'	Report	Panyukov 15', 44' (pen.); Jovičić (yellow card) 38'; Magomadov (yellow card) 53'; Karayev 90'	Stadium: Trud Stadium; Referee: Rafael Shafeev

21 October 2020 2	Veles Moscow	1 – 3	Ural Yekaterinburg	Domodedovo
14:00 YEKT (UTC+5)	Osipov (yellow card) 44'; Maksimenko 54'; Botaka-Ioboma (yellow card) 75'	Report	Rykov (yellow card) 12'; Yemelyanov (yellow card) 57'; Kalinin (yellow card) 74'; Bicfalvi 86' (pen.), 89', 90+'	Stadium: Avangard Stadium; Referee: Yunus Koshko

==== Round of 16 ====
3 March 2021 Round of 16	Ufa	3 – 0	Ural Yekaterinburg	Ufa
14:00 YEKT (UTC+5)	Bizoza (yellow card) 40'; Pliyev (yellow card) 43'; Zhamaletdinov 51', 67'; Andric 58' (pen.); Sukhov (yellow card) 64'; Mrzljak (yellow card) 66'; Miletić (yellow card) 89'; Jokić (yellow card) 90+5'	Report		Stadium: Neftyanik Stadium; Attendance: 1,672; Referee: Pavel Shadykhanov
Note: Match originally scheduled for 22 February, but postponed on 21 February due to server weather.

== Squad statistics ==
As of match played 16 May 2021

=== Appearances and goals ===
No.	Pos	Nat	Player	Total		Premier League		Russian Cup	
No.	Pos	Nat	Player	Apps	Goals	Apps	Goals	Apps	Goals
4	DF	(Norway) NOR	Stefan Strandberg	18	1	17	1	1	0
5	MF	(Russia) RUS	Andrei Yegorychev	29	2	26	2	2+1	0
6	MF	(Poland) POL	Rafał Augustyniak	28	4	22+3	4	1+2	0
7	FW	(Russia) RUS	David Karayev	8	1	1+5	0	1+1	1
8	MF	(Russia) RUS	Roman Yemelyanov	13	0	4+7	0	2	0
9	FW	(Russia) RUS	Pavel Pogrebnyak	19	4	16+2	4	0+1	0
10	MF	(Romania) ROU	Eric Bicfalvi	24	10	22	7	2	3
13	DF	(Ukraine) UKR	Ihor Kalinin	24	1	22	1	2	0
14	MF	(Russia) RUS	Yuri Bavin	7	0	3+4	0	0	0
15	DF	(Ukraine) UKR	Denys Kulakov	29	0	25+1	0	2+1	0
17	FW	(Kosovo) KOS	Ylldren Ibrahimaj	7	0	3+3	0	1	0
18	MF	(Serbia) SRB	Branko Jovičić	22	0	19	0	2+1	0
19	MF	(Croatia) CRO	Danijel Miškić	29	0	21+5	0	3	0
20	FW	(Russia) RUS	Andrei Panyukov	18	3	8+8	1	2	2
21	MF	(Russia) RUS	Vyacheslav Podberyozkin	19	1	12+7	1	0	0
22	DF	(Russia) RUS	Arsen Adamov	9	0	7+1	0	0+1	0
25	DF	(Russia) RUS	Ivan Kuzmichyov	1	0	0+1	0	0	0
28	GK	(Russia) RUS	Ivan Konovalov	2	0	1	0	1	0
30	MF	(Russia) RUS	Alexey Yevseyev	21	1	2+16	1	0+3	0
31	GK	(Russia) RUS	Yaroslav Hodzyur	14	0	12	0	2	0
34	MF	(Russia) RUS	Daniil Gerasimov	1	0	1	0	0	0
40	MF	(Russia) RUS	Ramazan Gadzhimuradov	12	2	6+5	2	1	0
44	DF	(Russia) RUS	Vladimir Rykov	21	0	19+1	0	1	0
55	FW	(Russia) RUS	Artyom Maksimenko	4	0	1+2	0	0+1	0
58	MF	(Netherlands) NED	Othman El Kabir	15	1	13+1	1	0+1	0
69	MF	(Russia) RUS	Artyom Shabolin	11	1	0+9	1	2	0
93	DF	(Russia) RUS	Aleksei Gerasimov	20	0	15+3	0	2	0
95	DF	(Russia) RUS	Chingiz Magomadov	3	0	0+2	0	1	0
99	FW	(Russia) RUS	Yevgeni Tatarinov	3	0	0+3	0	0	0
Players away from the club on loan:
Players who appeared for Ural Yekaterinburg but left during the season:
1	GK	(Russia) RUS	Ilya Pomazun	17	0	17	0	0	0
3	DF	(Armenia) ARM	Varazdat Haroyan	1	0	1	0	0	0
9	MF	(Switzerland) SUI	Marco Aratore	2	0	2	0	0	0
11	MF	(Russia) RUS	Dmitry Yefremov	11	0	5+5	0	1	0
35	DF	(Belarus) BLR	Nikolay Zolotov	10	0	7+1	0	1+1	0

=== Goal scorers ===
Place	Position	Nation	Number	Name	Premier League	Russian Cup	Total
1	MF	(Romania)	10	Eric Bicfalvi	7	3	10
2	FW	(Russia)	9	Pavel Pogrebnyak	4	0	4
2	MF	(Poland)	6	Rafał Augustyniak	4	0	4
4	FW	(Russia)	20	Andrei Panyukov	1	2	3
5	MF	(Russia)	5	Andrei Yegorychev	2	0	2
5	MF	(Russia)	40	Ramazan Gadzhimuradov	2	0	2
7	MF	(Russia)	21	Vyacheslav Podberyozkin	1	0	1
7	DF	(Norway)	4	Stefan Strandberg	1	0	1
7	MF	(Russia)	30	Alexey Yevseyev	1	0	1
7	MF	(Russia)	69	Artyom Shabolin	1	0	1
7	DF	(Russia)	13	Ihor Kalinin	1	0	1
7	MF	(Netherlands)	58	Othman El Kabir	1	0	1
7	FW	(Russia)	7	David Karayev	0	1	1
Total					26	6	32

=== Clean sheets ===
Place	Position	Nation	Number	Name	Premier League	Russian Cup	Total
1	GK	(Russia)	1	Ilya Pomazun	5	0	5
1	GK	(Russia)	31	Yaroslav Hodzyur	4	1	5
Total					9	1	10

=== Disciplinary record ===
Number	Nation	Position	Name	Premier League		Russian Cup		Total	
Number	Nation	Position	Name	Booked	Sent off (straight red)	Booked	Sent off (straight red)	Booked	Sent off (straight red)
1	(Russia)	GK	Ilya Pomazun	3	0	0	0	3	0
4	(Norway)	DF	Stefan Strandberg	4	1	0	0	4	1
5	(Russia)	MF	Andrei Yegorychev	7	0	0	0	7	0
6	(Poland)	MF	Rafał Augustyniak	6	1	0	0	6	1
8	(Russia)	MF	Roman Yemelyanov	4	1	1	0	5	1
9	(Russia)	FW	Pavel Pogrebnyak	5	1	0	0	5	1
10	(Romania)	MF	Eric Bicfalvi	4	0	0	0	4	0
13	(Ukraine)	DF	Ihor Kalinin	7	0	1	0	8	0
14	(Russia)	MF	Yuri Bavin	1	0	0	0	1	0
15	(Ukraine)	DF	Denys Kulakov	3	0	0	0	3	0
17	(Kosovo)	FW	Ylldren Ibrahimaj	1	0	0	0	1	0
18	(Serbia)	MF	Branko Jovičić	5	0	1	0	6	0
19	(Croatia)	MF	Danijel Miškić	6	1	0	0	6	1
20	(Russia)	FW	Andrei Panyukov	1	0	0	0	1	0
21	(Russia)	MF	Vyacheslav Podberyozkin	3	0	0	0	3	0
22	(Russia)	DF	Arsen Adamov	1	0	0	0	1	0
28	(Russia)	GK	Ivan Konovalov	1	0	0	0	1	0
30	(Russia)	MF	Alexey Yevseyev	2	0	0	0	2	0
31	(Russia)	GK	Yaroslav Hodzyur	2	0	0	0	2	0
40	(Russia)	MF	Ramazan Gadzhimuradov	3	0	0	0	3	0
44	(Russia)	DF	Vladimir Rykov	8	0	1	0	9	0
58	(Netherlands)	MF	Othman El Kabir	1	0	0	0	1	0
93	(Russia)	DF	Aleksei Gerasimov	2	0	0	0	2	0
95	(Russia)	DF	Chingiz Magomadov	1	0	1	0	2	0
Players away on loan:
Players who left Ural Yekaterinburg during the season:
3	(Armenia)	DF	Varazdat Haroyan	1	0	0	0	1	0
9	(Switzerland)	MF	Marco Aratore	2	0	0	0	2	0
11	(Russia)	MF	Dmitry Yefremov	1	0	0	0	1	0
35	(Belarus)	DF	Nikolay Zolotov	3	0	0	0	3	0
Total				88	5	5	0	93	2
