= Ivan Kuzmichyov =

Russian footballer

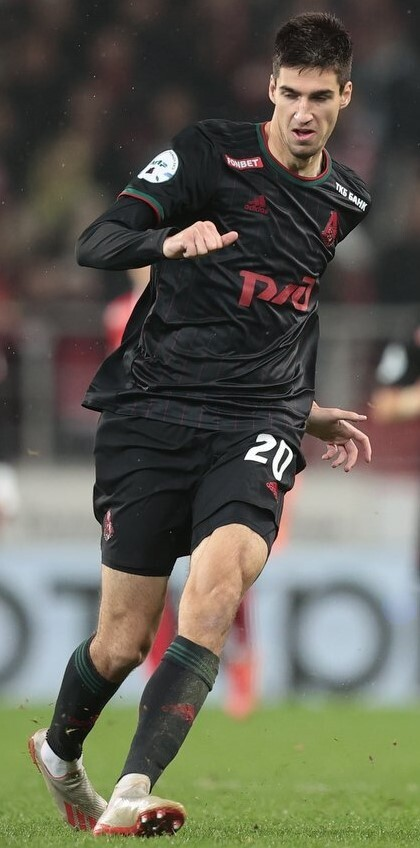
- Kuzmichyov with Lokomotiv Moscow in 2022

Personal information
- Full name: Ivan Aleksandrovich Kuzmichyov
- Date of birth: 20 October 2000 (age 26)
- Place of birth: Tolyatti, Russia
- Height: 1.99 m (6 ft 6 in)
- Position: Centre-back

Team information
- Current team: Okzhetpes
- Number: 63

Youth career
- 2011: Konoplyov football academy
- 2011–2016: Lada-Tolyatti
- 2017–2019: Konoplyov football academy

Senior career*
Years	Team	Apps	(Gls)
2019	Lada-Tolyatti	16	(2)
2020–2022	Ural Yekaterinburg	31	(0)
2020–2021	→ Ural-2 Yekaterinburg	16	(0)
2022–2026	Lokomotiv Moscow	16	(0)
2024	→ Torpedo Moscow (loan)	7	(0)
2025	→ Rodina Moscow (loan)	13	(0)
2026–	Okzhetpes	28	(2)

International career^{‡}
2021	Russia U-21	2	(0)
- * Club domestic league appearances and goals as of 1 November 2026 ‡ National team caps and goals as of 16 November 2021

Ivan Aleksandrovich Kuzmichyov (Russian: Иван Александрович Кузьмичёв; born 20 October 2000) is a Russian football player who plays as a centre-back for Kazakhstan Premier League club Okzhetpes.

== Club career ==
He made his debut in the Russian Premier League for Ural Yekaterinburg on 16 May 2021 in a game against Lokomotiv Moscow. He substituted Andrei Yegorychev in the 81st minute.

On 7 September 2022, Kuzmichyov signed a four-year contract with Lokomotiv Moscow.

On 21 February 2024, Kuzmichyov joined Torpedo Moscow on loan with an option to buy. On 20 February 2025, he moved on a new loan to Rodina Moscow until 15 December 2025, with an option to buy. On 12 February 2026, Kuzmichyov's contract with Lokomotiv was mutually terminated.

On 16 February 2026, Kuzmichyov signed with Okzhetpes in Kazakhstan.

== Career statistics ==
As of 27 November 2022

Club	Season	League			Cup		Continental		Total	
Club	Season	Division	Apps	Goals	Apps	Goals	Apps	Goals	Apps	Goals
Lada-Tolyatti	2019–20	PFL	16	2	1	0	–		17	2
Ural-2 Yekaterinburg	2020–21	FNL 2	13	0	–		–		13	0
Ural-2 Yekaterinburg	2021–22	FNL 2	3	0	–		–		3	0
Ural-2 Yekaterinburg	Total		16	0	0	0	0	0	16	0
Ural Yekaterinburg	2020–21	RPL	1	0	0	0	–		1	0
Ural Yekaterinburg	2021–22	RPL	23	0	1	0	–		24	0
Ural Yekaterinburg	2022–23	RPL	7	0	0	0	–		7	0
Ural Yekaterinburg	Total		31	0	1	0	0	0	32	0
Lokomotiv Moscow	2022–23	RPL	5	0	3	0	–		8	0
Career total			68	2	5	0	0	0	73	2
