= Yuri Zheleznov =

Russian footballer (born 2002)

Personal information
- Full name: Yuri Igorevich Zheleznov
- Date of birth: 15 November 2002 (age 23)
- Place of birth: Saransk, Russia
- Height: 1.73 m (5 ft 8 in)
- Position: Midfielder

Team information
- Current team: Akron Tolyatti
- Number: 14

Youth career
- –2014: Mordovia Saransk
- 2014–2015: Chertanovo Education Center
- 2015–2017: Spartak Moscow
- 2017–2019: Rubin Kazan
- 2019–2020: Zenit Saint Petersburg

Senior career*
Years	Team	Apps	(Gls)
2020–2021	Saturn Ramenskoye	23	(5)
2021–2026	Ural Yekaterinburg	90	(9)
2021–2023	Ural-2 Yekaterinburg	2	(0)
2023–2024	→ Krasnodar-2 (loan)	25	(6)
2026–	Akron Tolyatti	3	(0)

International career^{‡}
2019	Russia U18	3	(0)
2022	Russia U21	2	(0)
- * Club domestic league appearances and goals as of 15 August 2026 ‡ National team caps and goals as of 24 September 2022

Yuri Igorevich Zheleznov (Russian: Юрий Игоревич Железнов; born 15 November 2002) is a Russian professional footballer who plays as a left midfielder for Russian Premier League club Akron Tolyatti.

== Club career ==
He made his debut in the Russian Premier League for Ural Yekaterinburg on 25 July 2021 in a game against Krasnodar. He substituted Ylldren Ibrahimaj in the 66th minute. He scored his first league goal for Ural on 20 November 2021, a late equalizer in an away 1–1 draw against Krylia Sovetov Samara.

On 14 September 2023, Zheleznov was loaned by Krasnodar-2.

On 16 July 2026, Zheleznov signed a four-year contract with Akron Tolyatti.

== Career statistics ==
As of match played 15 August 2026

Appearances and goals by club, season and competition
Club	Season	League			Cup		Other		Total	
Club	Season	Division	Apps	Goals	Apps	Goals	Apps	Goals	Apps	Goals
Saturn Ramenskoye	2020–21	Russian Second League	23	5	1	0	—		24	5
Ural Yekaterinburg	2021–22	Russian Premier League	21	2	2	0	—		23	2
Ural Yekaterinburg	2022–23	Russian Premier League	14	0	6	0	—		20	0
Ural Yekaterinburg	2023–24	Russian Premier League	2	0	1	0	—		3	0
Ural Yekaterinburg	2024–25	Russian First League	24	3	5	0	—		29	3
Ural Yekaterinburg	2025–26	Russian First League	29	4	2	0	2 (Note: Appearances in promotion play-offs)	0	33	4
Ural Yekaterinburg	Total		90	9	16	0	2	0	108	9
Ural-2 Yekaterinburg	2021–22	Russian Second League	1	0	—		—		1	0
Ural-2 Yekaterinburg	2022–23	Russian Second League	1	0	—		—		1	0
Ural-2 Yekaterinburg	Total		2	0	0	0	0	0	2	0
Krasnodar-2 (loan)	2023–24	Russian Second League A	25	6	—		—		25	6
Akron Tolyatti	2026–27	Russian Premier League	3	0	1	0	—		4	0
Career total			143	20	18	0	2	0	163	20
