= Dmitry Makovsky =

Russian footballer

Personal information
- Full name: Dmitry Sergeyevich Makovsky
- Date of birth: 18 March 2000 (age 26)
- Height: 1.91 m (6 ft 3 in)
- Position: Midfielder

Youth career
- –2021: FC Ural Yekaterinburg

Senior career*
Years	Team	Apps	(Gls)
2019–2023	FC Ural-2 Yekaterinburg	45	(2)
2021	FC Ural Yekaterinburg	1	(0)
- * Club domestic league appearances and goals as of 4 June 2023

Dmitry Sergeyevich Makovsky (Russian: Дмитрий Сергеевич Маковский; born 18 March 2000) is a Russian football player.

== Club career ==
He made his debut in the Russian Premier League for FC Ural Yekaterinburg on 11 December 2021 in a game against FC Rostov.

== Career statistics ==
As of 21 May 2022

Club	Season	League			Cup		Continental		Other		Total	
Club	Season	Division	Apps	Goals	Apps	Goals	Apps	Goals	Apps	Goals	Apps	Goals
Ural Yekaterinburg	2019–20	RPL	0	0	0	0	–		1 (Note: Appearance in the FNL Cup)	0	1	0
Ural Yekaterinburg	2021–22	RPL	1	0	0	0	–		–		1	0
Ural Yekaterinburg	Total		1	0	0	0	0	0	1	0	2	0
Ural-2 Yekaterinburg	2020–21	FNL 2	10	0	–		–		–		10	0
Ural-2 Yekaterinburg	2021–22	FNL 2	19	2	–		–		–		19	2
Ural-2 Yekaterinburg	Total		29	2	0	0	0	0	0	0	29	2
Career total			30	2	0	0	0	0	1	0	31	2
