= Chingiz Magomadov =

Russian footballer (born 1998)

Personal information
- Full name: Chingiz Turpal-Eliyevich Magomadov
- Date of birth: 1 August 1998 (age 28)
- Place of birth: Kurchaloy, Russia
- Height: 1.78 m (5 ft 10 in)
- Position: Right-back

Team information
- Current team: FC Mashuk-KMV Pyatigorsk
- Number: 95

Senior career*
Years	Team	Apps	(Gls)
2015–2018	FC Akhmat Grozny	0	(0)
2016	→ FC Terek-2 Grozny	2	(0)
2017	→ PFC Spartak Nalchik (loan)	16	(1)
2019–2023	FC Ural Yekaterinburg	10	(0)
2019–2021	→ FC Ural-2 Yekaterinburg	31	(7)
2021	→ FC KAMAZ Naberezhnye Chelny (loan)	19	(0)
2022–2023	→ FC Volga Ulyanovsk (loan)	32	(2)
2023	FC Volga Ulyanovsk	9	(1)
2024–2025	FC Veles Moscow	46	(0)
2025–	FC Mashuk-KMV Pyatigorsk	52	(1)
- * Club domestic league appearances and goals as of 15 November 2026

Chingiz Turpal-Eliyevich Magomadov (Russian: Чингиз Турпал-Элиевич Магомадов; born 1 August 1998) is a Russian football player who plays as a right-back for FC Mashuk-KMV Pyatigorsk.

== Club career ==
He made his debut in the Russian Professional Football League for FC Terek-2 Grozny on 24 May 2016 in a game against PFC Spartak Nalchik.

In late January 2019 he signed with FC Ural Yekaterinburg. He made his debut for the main squad of Ural on 25 September 2019 in a Russian Cup game against FC Chernomorets Novorossiysk. He made his Russian Premier League debut for Ural on 22 July 2020 in a game against FC Lokomotiv Moscow, as a starter.

On 2 July 2021, he was loaned to FC KAMAZ Naberezhnye Chelny. On 10 January 2022, KAMAZ announced that Magomadov returned to Ural.

On 11 July 2022, Magomadov was loaned to FC Volga Ulyanovsk.

On 26 June 2023, Magomadov returned to FC Volga Ulyanovsk on a one-year deal.

== Career statistics ==
As of 21 May 2022

Club	Season	League			Cup		Continental		Other		Total	
Club	Season	Division	Apps	Goals	Apps	Goals	Apps	Goals	Apps	Goals	Apps	Goals
Terek-2 Grozny	2015–16	PFL	2	0	–		–		–		2	0
Akhmat Grozny	2016–17	RPL	0	0	0	0	–		–		0	0
Spartak Nalchik (loan)	2017–18	PFL	16	1	4	0	–		–		20	1
Ural Yekaterinburg	2018–19	RPL	0	0	0	0	–		3 (Note: Appearances in the FNL Cup)	1	3	1
Ural Yekaterinburg	2019–20	RPL	1	0	2	0	–		4	1	7	1
Ural Yekaterinburg	2020–21	RPL	2	0	1	0	–		–		3	0
Ural Yekaterinburg	2021–22	RPL	7	0	–		–		–		7	0
Ural Yekaterinburg	Total		10	0	3	0	0	0	7	2	20	2
Ural-2 Yekaterinburg	2018–19	PFL	9	2	–		–		–		9	2
Ural-2 Yekaterinburg	2019–20	PFL	15	5	–		–		–		15	5
Ural-2 Yekaterinburg	2020–21	PFL	7	0	–		–		–		7	0
Ural-2 Yekaterinburg	Total		31	7	0	0	0	0	0	0	31	7
KAMAZ (loan)	2021–22	FNL	19	0	3	0	–		–		22	0
Career total			78	8	10	0	0	0	7	2	95	10
