= Mikhail Ageyev (footballer) =

Russian footballer

Personal information
- Full name: Mikhail Andreyevich Ageyev
- Date of birth: 22 April 2000 (age 26)
- Place of birth: Volzhsky, Russia
- Height: 1.83 m (6 ft 0 in)
- Position: Forward

Team information
- Current team: FC Dynamo Kirov
- Number: 13

Youth career
- –2018: FC Dynamo Moscow
- 2019: FC Lokomotiv Moscow

Senior career*
Years	Team	Apps	(Gls)
2019–2021	FC Kazanka Moscow	34	(11)
2020–2021	FC Lokomotiv Moscow	1	(0)
2021–2023	FC Ural Yekaterinburg	11	(0)
2021–2023	FC Ural-2 Yekaterinburg	16	(4)
2022–2023	→ FC Volgar Astrakhan (loan)	13	(1)
2023–2024	FC Rotor Volgograd	31	(1)
2025	FC Metallurg Lipetsk	12	(3)
2025–2026	FC Kuban Krasnodar	29	(6)
2026–	FC Dynamo Kirov	17	(1)

International career^{‡}
2015–2016	Russia U-16	10	(3)
2016	Russia U-17	6	(2)
2018	Russia U-18	1	(0)
2019	Russia U-19	1	(0)
- * Club domestic league appearances and goals as of 15 November 2026 ‡ National team caps and goals as of 30 May 2021

Mikhail Andreyevich Ageyev (Russian: Михаил Андреевич Агеев; born 22 April 2000) is a Russian football player who plays as a centre-forward for FC Dynamo Kirov.

== Club career ==
He was first called up to the senior squad of FC Lokomotiv Moscow in June 2020. He made his Russian Premier League debut for Lokomotiv on 11 August 2020 in a game against FC Rubin Kazan, he substituted Fyodor Smolov in added time.

On 15 June 2021, he signed with FC Ural Yekaterinburg.

On 14 June 2022, Ageyev joined FC Volgar Astrakhan on loan.

== Honours ==
=== Club ===
Lokomotiv Moscow

- Russian Cup: 2020–21

== Career statistics ==
As of 21 May 2022

Club	Season	League			Cup		Continental		Total	
Club	Season	Division	Apps	Goals	Apps	Goals	Apps	Goals	Apps	Goals
Kazanka Moscow	2018–19	PFL	7	4	–		–		7	4
Kazanka Moscow	2019–20	PFL	16	1	–		–		16	1
Kazanka Moscow	2020–21	PFL	11	6	–		–		11	6
Kazanka Moscow	Total		34	11	0	0	0	0	34	11
Lokomotiv Moscow	2019–20	RPL	0	0	0	0	0	0	0	0
Lokomotiv Moscow	2020–21	RPL	1	0	1	0	0	0	2	0
Lokomotiv Moscow	Total		1	0	1	0	0	0	2	0
Ural Yekaterinburg	2021–22	RPL	11	0	2	0	–		13	0
Ural-2 Yekaterinburg	2021–22	FNL2	2	1	–		–		2	1
Career total			48	12	3	0	0	0	51	12
