= Artyom Mamin =

Russian footballer (born 1997)

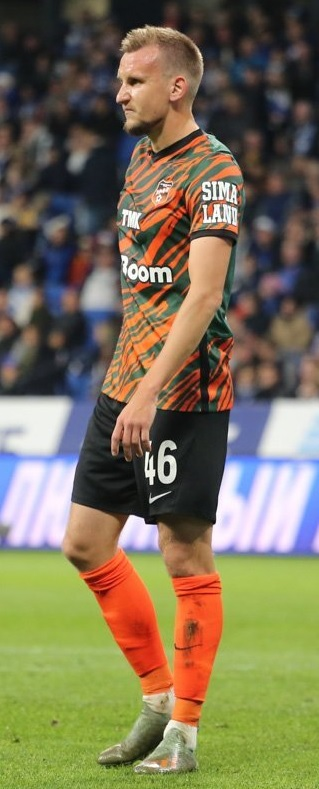
- Mamin with Ural in 2022

Personal information
- Full name: Artyom Vitalyevich Mamin
- Date of birth: 25 July 1997 (age 29)
- Place of birth: Yekaterinburg, Russia
- Height: 1.87 m (6 ft 2 in)
- Position: Centre-back

Team information
- Current team: Ural Yekaterinburg
- Number: 46

Youth career
- –2019: Spartak Moscow

Senior career*
Years	Team	Apps	(Gls)
2016–2019	Spartak-2 Moscow	59	(1)
2018–2019	Spartak Moscow	1	(0)
2019–	Ural Yekaterinburg	59	(1)
2019–2020	→ Ural-2 Yekaterinburg	5	(0)
2020–2021	→ Orenburg (loan)	19	(0)
2021	→ Chayka (loan)	0	(0)
2021	→ Tom Tomsk (loan)	7	(0)

International career^{‡}
2012	Russia U15	3	(0)
2013	Russia U16	2	(1)
2013–2014	Russia U17	11	(0)
2014–2015	Russia U18	9	(2)
2015–2016	Russia U19	3	(0)
- * Club domestic league appearances and goals as of 16 May 2026 ‡ National team caps and goals as of 29 March 2016

Artyom Vitalyevich Mamin (Russian: Артём Витальевич Мамин; born 25 July 1997) is a Russian football player who plays as a centre-back for Ural Yekaterinburg.

== Club career ==
He made his debut in the Russian Football National League for Spartak-2 Moscow on 1 April 2017 in a game against Zenit-2 St. Petersburg.

He made his Russian Premier League debut for Spartak Moscow on 5 May 2018 in a game against Rostov.

On 7 August 2019, he returned to his native city, signing a long-term contract with Ural Yekaterinburg. He made his debut for the main squad of Ural Yekaterinburg on 25 September 2019 in a Russian Cup game against Chernomorets Novorossiysk.

On 22 June 2021, he joined Chayka Peschanokopskoye on a season-long loan. Before the season started, Chayka was punished for match fixing and relegated, and on 8 July 2021, he moved on loan to Tom Tomsk instead. On 3 September 2021, he was recalled from loan and returned to Ural.

On 7 June 2023, Mamin extended his contract with Ural.

== Personal life ==
His younger brother Aleksei Mamin is also a football player.

== Career statistics ==
As of 1 June 2024

Club	Season	League			Cup		Continental		Other		Total	
Club	Season	Division	Apps	Goals	Apps	Goals	Apps	Goals	Apps	Goals	Apps	Goals
Spartak-2 Moscow	2015–16	Russian First League	0	0	–		–		2 (Note: Appearances in the FNL Cup)	0	2	0
Spartak-2 Moscow	2016–17	Russian First League	1	0	–		–		2	0	3	0
Spartak-2 Moscow	2017–18	Russian First League	35	1	–		–		2	0	37	1
Spartak-2 Moscow	2018–19	Russian First League	23	0	–		–		5	0	28	0
Spartak-2 Moscow	Total		59	1	0	0	0	0	11	0	70	1
Spartak Moscow	2017–18	Russian Premier League	1	0	0	0	0	0	–		1	0
Spartak Moscow	2018–19	Russian Premier League	0	0	1	0	0	0	–		1	0
Spartak Moscow	Total		1	0	1	0	0	0	0	0	1	0
Ural-2 Yekaterinburg	2019–20	Russian Second League	5	0	–		–		–		5	0
Ural Yekaterinburg	2019–20	Russian Premier League	1	0	1	0	–		1	0	3	0
Ural Yekaterinburg	2020–21	Russian Premier League	0	0	–		–		–		0	0
Ural Yekaterinburg	2021–22	Russian Premier League	13	0	1	0	–		–		14	0
Ural Yekaterinburg	2022–23	Russian Premier League	9	0	5	0	–		–		14	0
Ural Yekaterinburg	2023–24	Russian Premier League	13	0	6	0	–		0	0	19	0
Ural Yekaterinburg	Total		36	0	13	0	0	0	1	0	50	0
Orenburg (loan)	2020–21	Russian First League	19	0	0	0	–		–		19	0
Tom Tomsk (loan)	2021–22	Russian First League	7	0	1	0	–		–		8	0
Career total			127	1	15	0	0	0	12	0	154	1
