= Dmitry Landakov =

Russian footballer

Personal information
- Full name: Dmitry Andreyevich Landakov
- Date of birth: 21 May 1999 (age 27)
- Place of birth: Moscow, Russia
- Height: 1.98 m (6 ft 6 in)
- Position: Goalkeeper

Youth career
- –2014: Chertanovo
- 2014–2018: Lokomotiv Moscow
- 2018–2020: Orenburg

Senior career*
Years	Team	Apps	(Gls)
2020–2023	Ural-2 Yekaterinburg	43	(0)
2021–2023	Ural Yekaterinburg	1	(0)
2024	Spartak Tambov	3	(0)
- * Club domestic league appearances and goals as of 25 August 2024

Dmitry Andreyevich Landakov (Russian: Дмитрий Андреевич Ландаков; born 21 May 1999) is a Russian football player.

== Club career ==
He made his debut in the Russian Premier League for Ural Yekaterinburg on 21 August 2021 in a game against Dynamo Moscow.

== Career statistics ==
As of 27 November 2022

Club	Season	League			Cup		Continental		Total	
Club	Season	Division	Apps	Goals	Apps	Goals	Apps	Goals	Apps	Goals
Ural-2 Yekaterinburg	2020–21	Second League	14	0	–		–		14	0
Ural-2 Yekaterinburg	2021–22	Second League	9	0	–		–		9	0
Ural-2 Yekaterinburg	2022–23	Second League	10	0	–		–		10	0
Ural-2 Yekaterinburg	Total		33	0	0	0	0	0	33	0
Ural Yekaterinburg	2021–22	Premier League	1	0	0	0	–		1	0
Ural Yekaterinburg	2022–23	Premier League	0	0	0	0	–		0	0
Ural Yekaterinburg	Total		1	0	0	0	0	0	1	0
Career total			34	0	0	0	0	0	34	0
