= Artyom Shmykov =

Russian footballer (born 2002)

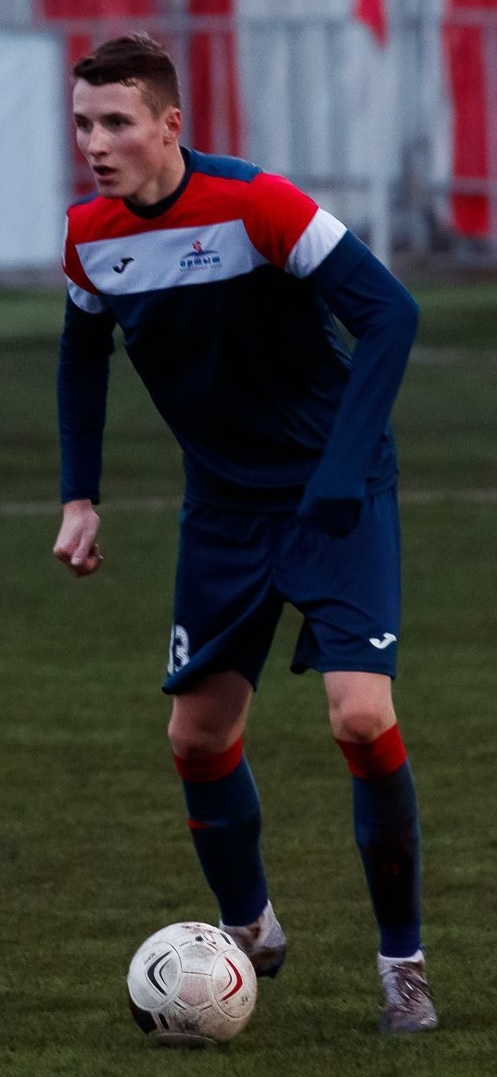
- Shmykov with Irtysh Omsk in 2020

Personal information
- Full name: Artyom Mikhailovich Shmykov
- Date of birth: 8 January 2002 (age 24)
- Place of birth: Dzerzhinsk, Russia
- Height: 1.86 m (6 ft 1 in)
- Position: Centre-back

Youth career
- FC Khimik Dzerzhinsk

Senior career*
Years	Team	Apps	(Gls)
2018–2020	FC Nizhny Novgorod	4	(0)
2020–2021	FC Irtysh Omsk	17	(0)
2021–2024	FC Ural-2 Yekaterinburg	6	(0)
2021–2023	FC Ural Yekaterinburg	0	(0)
2022–2023	→ FC Kuban Krasnodar (loan)	0	(0)
2023	→ FC Irtysh Omsk (loan)	0	(0)
2024	FC Spartak Kostroma	7	(0)
2024–2025	FC Volna Nizhny Novgorod Oblast	13	(0)
- * Club domestic league appearances and goals as of 29 June 2025

Artyom Mikhailovich Shmykov (Russian: Артём Михайлович Шмыков; born 8 January 2002) is a Russian football player who plays as a centre-back.

== Club career ==
He made his debut in the Russian Football National League for FC Nizhny Novgorod on 30 August 2020 in a game against FC Tekstilshchik Ivanovo.

On 22 June 2021, he signed a long-term contract with Russian Premier League club FC Ural Yekaterinburg and assigned to the second squad in the third-tier FNL 2.

== Career statistics ==
As of 4 June 2022

Club	Season	League			Cup		Continental		Total	
Club	Season	Division	Apps	Goals	Apps	Goals	Apps	Goals	Apps	Goals
Nizhny Novgorod	2018–19	FNL	0	0	–		–		0	0
Nizhny Novgorod	2019–20	FNL	0	0	0	0	–		0	0
Nizhny Novgorod	2020–21	FNL	4	0	0	0	–		4	0
Nizhny Novgorod	Total		4	0	0	0	0	0	4	0
Irtysh Omsk	2020–21	FNL	17	0	–		–		17	0
Ural-2 Yekaterinburg	2021–22	FNL 2	6	0	–		–		6	0
Career total			27	0	0	0	0	0	27	0
