= Nikita Khrisanfov =

Russian footballer

Personal information
- Full name: Nikita Sergeyevich Khrisanfov
- Date of birth: 24 March 2004 (age 22)
- Place of birth: Kirov, Russia
- Height: 1.81 m (5 ft 11 in)
- Position: Midfielder

Team information
- Current team: Ural Yekaterinburg/Ural-2 Yekaterinburg
- Number: 40

Youth career
- –2020: DYuSSh-5 Kirov
- 2020–2021: Konoplyov football academy
- 2022: Krylia Sovetov Samara
- 2023: Ural Yekaterinburg

Senior career*
Years	Team	Apps	(Gls)
2024–2025	Ural Yekaterinburg	0	(0)
2023–2025	→ Ural-2 Yekaterinburg	44	(7)
2025	Slutsk	15	(1)
2026–	Ural-2 Yekaterinburg	27	(7)
2026–	Ural Yekaterinburg	0	(0)
- * Club domestic league appearances and goals as of 1 November 2026

Nikita Sergeyevich Khrisanfov (Russian: Никита Сергеевич Хрисанфов; born 24 March 2004) is a Russian footballer who plays as a midfielder for Ural Yekaterinburg and Ural-2 Yekaterinburg.

== Career ==
He made his debut in the Russian Second League for Ural-2 Yekaterinburg on 16 July 2023, in a game against Rubin-2 Kazan.

He made his debut in the Belarusian Premier League for Slutsk on 3 August 2025 in a game against Maxline Vitebsk.
