= Aleksandr Yushin =

Russian footballer

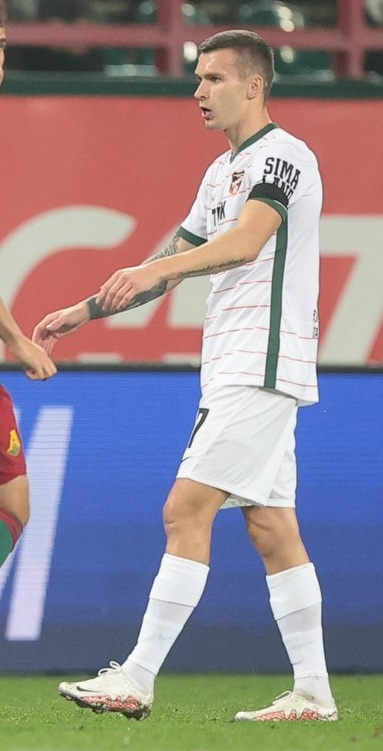
- Yushin with Ural Yekaterinburg in 2022

Personal information
- Full name: Aleksandr Yuryevich Yushin
- Date of birth: 4 April 1995 (age 31)
- Place of birth: Moscow, Russia
- Height: 1.81 m (5 ft 11 in)
- Position: Forward

Team information
- Current team: Torpedo Moscow
- Number: 7

Youth career
- 2001–2007: Spartak Moscow
- 2008: Krylia Sovetov Moscow
- 2009–2012: SDYuShOR Spartak-2 Moscow
- 2012–2013: Spartak Moscow

Senior career*
Years	Team	Apps	(Gls)
2014	Aventa-2000 Moscow (amateur)		
2015	Teteks	0	(0)
2015	Ulisses	6	(1)
2016	Belshina Bobruisk	21	(1)
2017	Metallurg Moscow (amateur)		
2017	FShM Moscow (amateur)		
2018	Kaluga	9	(3)
2018	Khimik Novomoskovsk	13	(2)
2019	Belshina Bobruisk	27	(26)
2020–2021	Neftekhimik Nizhnekamsk	58	(24)
2022–2023	Ural Yekaterinburg	45	(5)
2024	Rodina Moscow	31	(9)
2025–	Torpedo Moscow	40	(10)
- * Club domestic league appearances and goals as of 16 May 2026

Aleksandr Yuryevich Yushin (Russian: Александр Юрьевич Юшин; born 4 April 1995) is a Russian professional footballer who plays as a centre-forward or winger for Torpedo Moscow.

== Club career ==
He made his Armenian Premier League debut for Ulisses on 30 August 2015 in a game against Mika.

He made his Belarusian Premier League debut for Belshina Bobruisk on 2 April 2016 in a game against Krumkachy Minsk.

He made his debut in the Russian Professional Football League for Kaluga on 24 April 2018 in a game against Torpedo Moscow.

He made his debut in the Russian Football National League for Neftekhimik Nizhnekamsk on 15 March 2020 in a game against Khimki.

On 12 January 2022, he signed a 2.5-year contract with Russian Premier League club Ural Yekaterinburg. Yushin made his RPL debut for Ural on 7 March 2022 against FC Krasnodar.

On 2 February 2024, Yushin moved to Rodina Moscow in the Russian First League.

On 10 January 2025, Yushin signed with Torpedo Moscow.

== International career ==
Yushin was first called up to the Russia national football team for a training camp in September 2023. He made his debut on 12 September 2023 in an unofficial friendly against Qatar.

== Career statistics ==
=== Club ===
As of 24 May 2025

Appearances and goals by club, season and competition
Club	Season	League			National Cup		Europe		Other		Total	
Club	Season	Division	Apps	Goals	Apps	Goals	Apps	Goals	Apps	Goals	Apps	Goals
Ulisses	2015–16	Armenian Premier League	6	1	1	0	–		–		7	1
Belshina Bobruisk	2016	Belarusian Premier League	21	1	1	1	–		0	0	22	2
Kaluga	2017–18	Russian Second League	9	3	–		–		–		9	3
Khimik Novomoskovsk	2018–19	Russian Second League	13	2	–		–		–		13	2
Belshina Bobruisk	2019	Belarusian First League	27	26	2	0	–		–		29	26
Neftekhimik Nizhnekamsk	2019–20	Russian First League	1	0	–		–		–		1	0
Neftekhimik Nizhnekamsk	2020–21	Russian First League	32	6	1	0	–		–		33	6
Neftekhimik Nizhnekamsk	2021–22	Russian First League	25	18	1	0	–		–		26	18
Neftekhimik Nizhnekamsk	Total		58	24	2	0	0	0	–		60	24
Ural Yekaterinburg	2021–22	Russian Premier League	6	0	–		–		–		6	0
Ural Yekaterinburg	2022–23	Russian Premier League	26	5	11	2	–		–		37	7
Ural Yekaterinburg	2023–24	Russian Premier League	13	0	6	1	–		–		19	1
Ural Yekaterinburg	Total		45	5	17	3	0	0	0	0	62	8
Rodina Moscow	2023–24	Russian First League	12	1	1	1	–		–		13	2
Rodina Moscow	2024–25	Russian First League	19	8	0	0	–		–		19	8
Rodina Moscow	Total		31	9	1	1	0	0	0	0	32	10
Torpedo Moscow	2024–25	Russian First League	11	3	0	0	–		–		11	3
Career total			221	74	24	5	0	0	0	0	245	79
