= Aleksandr Galimov (footballer) =

Russian footballer

Personal information
- Full name: Aleksandr Mikhailovich Galimov
- Date of birth: 9 February 2000 (age 26)
- Place of birth: Yekaterinburg, Russia
- Height: 1.75 m (5 ft 9 in)
- Position: Midfielder

Team information
- Current team: Luki-Energiya
- Number: 27

Senior career*
Years	Team	Apps	(Gls)
2017–2022	Ural Yekaterinburg	0	(0)
2018–2019	→ Ural-2 Yekaterinburg	7	(0)
2019	→ Pyunik (loan)	4	(0)
2020–2021	→ Yenisey Krasnoyarsk (loan)	15	(3)
2021–2022	→ SKA-Khabarovsk (loan)	15	(0)
2021–2022	→ SKA-Khabarovsk-2 (loan)	5	(0)
2022	→ Ural-2 Yekaterinburg	14	(0)
2023	Shinnik Yaroslavl	5	(0)
2023	Dynamo Kirov	14	(1)
2024	Astrakhan	21	(0)
2025	Uralets-TS Nizhny Tagil	22	(5)
2026–	Luki-Energiya	18	(1)
- * Club domestic league appearances and goals as of 1 November 2026

Aleksandr Mikhailovich Galimov (Russian: Александр Михайлович Галимов; born 9 February 2000) is a Russian football player who plays for Luki-Energiya.

== Club career ==
He made his debut in the Russian Professional Football League for FC Ural-2 Yekaterinburg on 10 October 2018 in a game against FC Syzran-2003.

On 5 July 2019, Galimov joined FC Pyunik on loan.
