= Leo Goglichidze =

Russian footballer (born 1997)

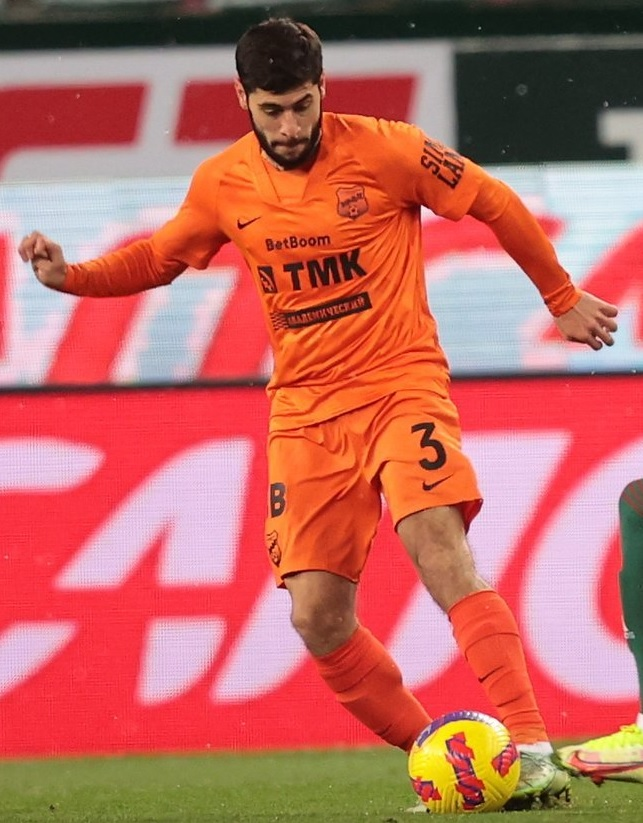
- Goglichidze with Ural Yekaterinburg in 2021

Personal information
- Full name: Leo Zurabovich Goglichidze
- Date of birth: 29 April 1997 (age 29)
- Place of birth: Rostov-on-Don, Russia
- Height: 1.79 m (5 ft 10 in)
- Position: Left back

Team information
- Current team: Rodina Moscow
- Number: 3

Youth career
- 2013–2017: Kransnodar

Senior career*
Years	Team	Apps	(Gls)
2014–2017	Krasnodar-2	67	(4)
2016–2020	Krasnodar	0	(0)
2018–2019	→ Nizhny Novgorod (loan)	30	(0)
2019	→ Krasnodar-2	2	(0)
2019	→ Krasnodar-3	4	(0)
2019–2020	→ Chayka Peschanokopskoye (loan)	14	(1)
2020–2021	Chayka Peschanokopskoye	23	(2)
2021–2022	Krasnodar	0	(0)
2021	→ Nizhny Novgorod (loan)	10	(0)
2021–2022	→ Ural Yekaterinburg (loan)	21	(1)
2022–2025	Ural Yekaterinburg	47	(1)
2023–2024	→ Orenburg (loan)	19	(0)
2025	Akhmat Grozny	4	(0)
2025–	Rodina Moscow	24	(0)

International career^{‡}
2016–2018	Russia U21	4	(0)
- * Club domestic league appearances and goals as of 22 November 2026 ‡ National team caps and goals as of 7 September 2018

Leo Zurabovich Goglichidze (Russian: Лео Зурабович Гогличидзе; Georgian: ლეო გოგლიჩიძე; born 29 April 1997) is a Russian football player of Georgian origin who plays as a left back for Rodina Moscow.

== Club career ==
He made his debut in the Russian Professional Football League for Krasnodar-2 on 6 November 2014 in a game against Sochi.

He made his debut for the main squad of Krasnodar in the Russian Cup game against Spartak Nalchik on 21 September 2016.

He made his Russian Football National League debut for Olimpiyets Nizhny Novgorod on 11 April 2018 in a game against Yenisey Krasnoyarsk.

On 30 August 2019, he joined Chayka Peschanokopskoye on loan. In the summer of 2020, he moved to Chayka on a permanent basis.

On 13 January 2021, FC Krasnodar bought back his rights from Chayka and then sent him on loan to Nizhny Novgorod until the end of the 2020–21 season, with Nizhny Novgorod holding an option to make the transfer permanent at the end of the loan term. On 19 June 2021, he returned to Nizhny Novgorod on another loan. He made his Russian Premier League debut for Nizhny Novgorod on 26 July 2021 in a game against Sochi.

On 2 September 2021, Krasnodar recalled him from loan and he joined Ural Yekaterinburg on loan instead.

On 28 May 2022, Goglichidze moved to Ural on a permanent basis and signed a long-term contract with the club.

On 22 June 2023, Goglichidze joined Orenburg on loan with an option to buy.

On 19 February 2025, Goglichidze signed with Akhmat Grozny until the end of the 2024–25 season, with an option to extend for two more seasons. He left Akhmat on 17 June 2025.

== Career statistics ==
As of match played 22 November 2026

Appearances and goals by club, season and competition
Club	Season	League			Cup		Continental		Other		Total	
Club	Season	Division	Apps	Goals	Apps	Goals	Apps	Goals	Apps	Goals	Apps	Goals
Krasnodar-2	2014–15	Russian Second League	13	0	—		—		—		13	0
Krasnodar-2	2015–16	Russian Second League	21	1	—		—		4 (Note: Appearances in the FNL Cup)	0	25	1
Krasnodar-2	2016–17	Russian Second League	19	2	—		—		5	0	24	2
Krasnodar-2	2017–18	Russian Second League	13	1	—		—		—		13	1
Krasnodar-2	2019–20	Russian First League	3	0	—		—		—		3	0
Krasnodar-2	Total		69	4	0	0	0	0	9	0	78	4
Krasnodar	2016–17	Russian Premier League	0	0	1	0	0	0	—		1	0
Nizhny Novgorod (loan)	2017–18	Russian First League	5	0	—		—		—		5	0
Nizhny Novgorod (loan)	2018–19	Russian First League	25	0	3	0	—		2 (Note: Appearances in the promotion play-offs)	0	30	0
Krasnodar-3	2019–20	Russian Second League	4	0	—		—		—		4	0
Chayka Peschanokopskoye (loan)	2019–20	Russian First League	14	1	1	0	—		—		15	1
Chayka Peschanokopskoye	2020–21	Russian First League	23	2	1	0	—		—		24	2
Chayka Peschanokopskoye	Total		37	3	2	0	0	0	0	0	39	3
Nizhny Novgorod (loan)	2020–21	Russian First League	8	0	—		—		—		8	0
Nizhny Novgorod (loan)	2021–22	Russian Premier League	2	0	—		—		—		2	0
Nizhny Novgorod (loan)	Total (2 spells)		40	0	3	0	0	0	2	0	45	0
Ural Yekaterinburg	2021–22	Russian Premier League	21	1	2	0	—		—		23	1
Ural Yekaterinburg	2022–23	Russian Premier League	26	0	11	0	—		—		37	0
Ural Yekaterinburg	2024–25	Russian First League	21	1	1	0	—		—		22	1
Ural Yekaterinburg	Total		68	2	14	0	0	0	0	0	82	2
Orenburg (loan)	2023–24	Russian Premier League	19	0	4	0	—		—		23	0
Akhmat Grozny	2024–25	Russian Premier League	4	0	2	0	—		1 (Note: Appearance in the relegation play-offs)	0	7	0
Rodina Moscow	2025–26	Russian First League	15	0	2	0	—		—		17	0
Rodina Moscow	2026–27	Russian Premier League	9	0	3	0	—		—		12	0
Rodina Moscow	Total		24	0	5	0	0	0	0	0	29	0
Career total			265	9	31	0	0	0	12	0	308	9
