= Andrei Yegorychev =

Russian footballer

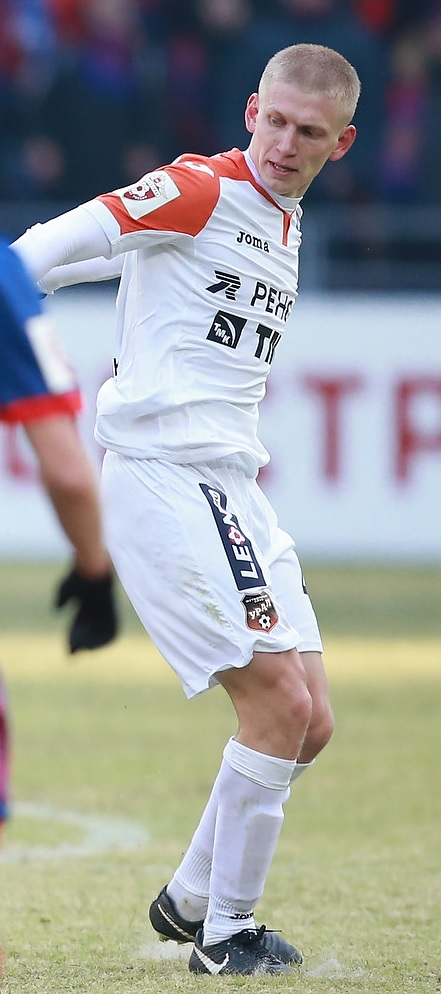
- Yegorychev with Ural Yekaterinburg in 2018

Personal information
- Full name: Andrei Sergeyevich Yegorychev
- Date of birth: 14 February 1993 (age 33)
- Place of birth: Voronezh, Russia
- Height: 1.83 m (6 ft 0 in)
- Position: Right midfielder

Team information
- Current team: Rodina Moscow
- Number: 5

Youth career
- DYuSShOR-15 Voronezh

Senior career*
Years	Team	Apps	(Gls)
2010	FC Stalmost Voronezh		
2014	Vybor-Kurbatovo Voronezh	8	(1)
2015	MITOS Novocherkassk	0	(0)
2016	Atom Novovoronezh (amateur)		
2017	Nosta Novotroitsk	16	(6)
2017–2025	Ural Yekaterinburg	186	(14)
2025–	Rodina Moscow	38	(1)
- * Club domestic league appearances and goals as of 22 November 2026

Andrei Sergeyevich Yegorychev (Russian: Андрей Сергеевич Егорычев; born 14 February 1993) is a Russian football player who plays for Rodina Moscow. His primary position is right midfielder and he also plays as right back.

== Career ==
He made his professional debut in the Russian Professional Football League for Vybor-Kurbatovo Voronezh on 25 July 2014 in a game against Arsenal-2 Tula.

He made his Russian Premier League debut for Ural Yekaterinburg on 3 March 2018 in a game against PFC CSKA Moscow.

Yegorychev reached the final of the 2018–19 Russian Cup with Ural Yekaterinburg.

On 4 June 2023, Yegorychev extended his contract with Ural for two more seasons.

== Career statistics ==
As of match played 22 November 2026

Appearances and goals by club, season and competition
Club	Season	League			Cup		Other		Total	
Club	Season	Division	Apps	Goals	Apps	Goals	Apps	Goals	Apps	Goals
Vybor-Kurbatovo	2014–15	Russian Second League	8	1	1	0	–		9	1
Atom Novovoronezh	2016	Russian Amateur Football League	–		2	0	–		2	0
Atom Novovoronezh	2017	Russian Amateur Football League	–							
Atom Novovoronezh	Total		0	0	2	0	0	0	2	0
Nosta Novotroitsk	2017–18	Russian Second League	16	6	1	0	–		17	6
Ural Yekaterinburg	2017–18	Russian Premier League	5	0	–		4 (Note: Appearances in the FNL Cup)	1	9	1
Ural Yekaterinburg	2018–19	Russian Premier League	20	1	5	0	–		25	1
Ural Yekaterinburg	2019–20	Russian Premier League	26	0	3	0	1	1	30	1
Ural Yekaterinburg	2020–21	Russian Premier League	26	2	3	0	–		29	2
Ural Yekaterinburg	2021–22	Russian Premier League	29	1	2	1	–		31	2
Ural Yekaterinburg	2022–23	Russian Premier League	21	2	11	1	–		32	3
Ural Yekaterinburg	2023–24	Russian Premier League	25	5	7	1	2 (Note: Appearances in relegation play-offs)	0	34	6
Ural Yekaterinburg	2024–25	Russian First League	34	3	2	0	2 (Note: Appearances in promotion play-offs)	0	38	3
Ural Yekaterinburg	Total		186	14	33	3	9	2	228	19
Ural-2 Yekaterinburg	2017–18	Russian Second League	1	0	–		–		1	0
Ural-2 Yekaterinburg	2018–19	Russian Second League	2	0	–		–		2	0
Ural-2 Yekaterinburg	Total		3	0	0	0	0	0	3	0
Rodina Moscow	2025–26	Russian First League	27	1	1	0	–		28	1
Rodina Moscow	2026–27	Russian Premier League	11	0	4	1	–		15	1
Rodina Moscow	Total		38	1	5	1	0	0	43	2
Career total			251	22	42	4	9	2	302	28
