= Vladislav Poletayev =

Russian footballer

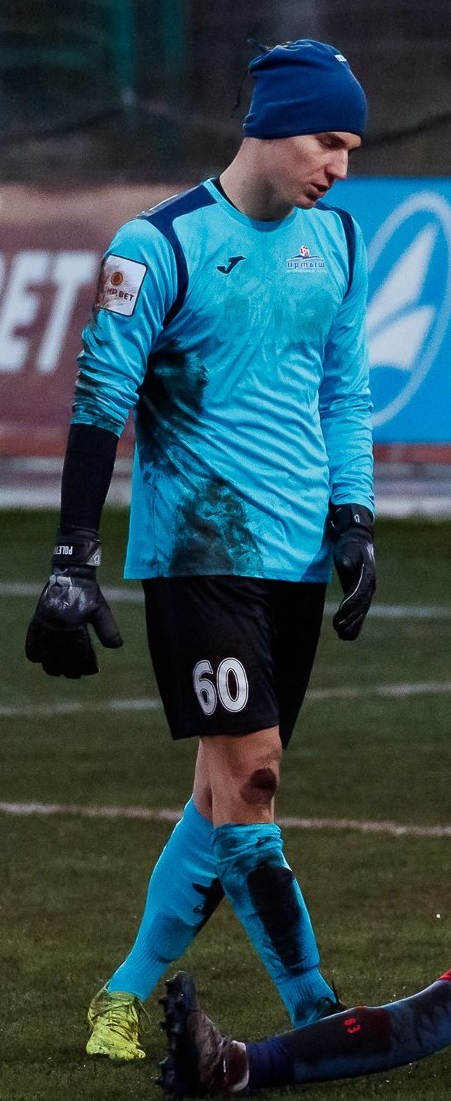
- Poletayev with Irtysh Omsk in 2020

Personal information
- Full name: Vladislav Pavlovich Poletayev
- Date of birth: 5 January 2000 (age 26)
- Place of birth: Kormilovka, Russia
- Height: 1.88 m (6 ft 2 in)
- Position: Goalkeeper

Team information
- Current team: FC Irtysh Omsk
- Number: 60

Senior career*
Years	Team	Apps	(Gls)
2016–2023	FC Ural Yekaterinburg	1	(0)
2018–2020	→ FC Ural-2 Yekaterinburg	9	(0)
2020–2021	→ FC Irtysh Omsk (loan)	27	(0)
2021	→ FC Orenburg (loan)	0	(0)
2021	→ FC Orenburg-2 (loan)	4	(0)
2022	→ FC Tom Tomsk (loan)	9	(0)
2022	→ FC Volga Ulyanovsk (loan)	1	(0)
2022–2023	→ FC Forte Taganrog (loan)	16	(0)
2023–	FC Irtysh Omsk	36	(0)

International career^{‡}
2019	Russia U20	3	(0)
- * Club domestic league appearances and goals as of 17 October 2026 ‡ National team caps and goals as of 8 August 2019

Vladislav Pavlovich Poletayev (Russian: Владислав Павлович Полетаев; born 5 January 2000) is a Russian football goalkeeper who plays for FC Irtysh Omsk.

== Club career ==
He made his debut in the Russian Premier League for FC Ural Yekaterinburg on 12 July 2020 in a game against FC Krasnodar, as a starter.

On 28 December 2021, he moved on loan to FC Tom Tomsk. On 20 June 2022, Poletayev was loaned to FC Volga Ulyanovsk.

On 26 June 2023, Poletayev returned to FC Irtysh Omsk and signed a two-year contract.
