= Central Stadium (Yekaterinburg) =

Football stadium in Yekaterinburg, Russia

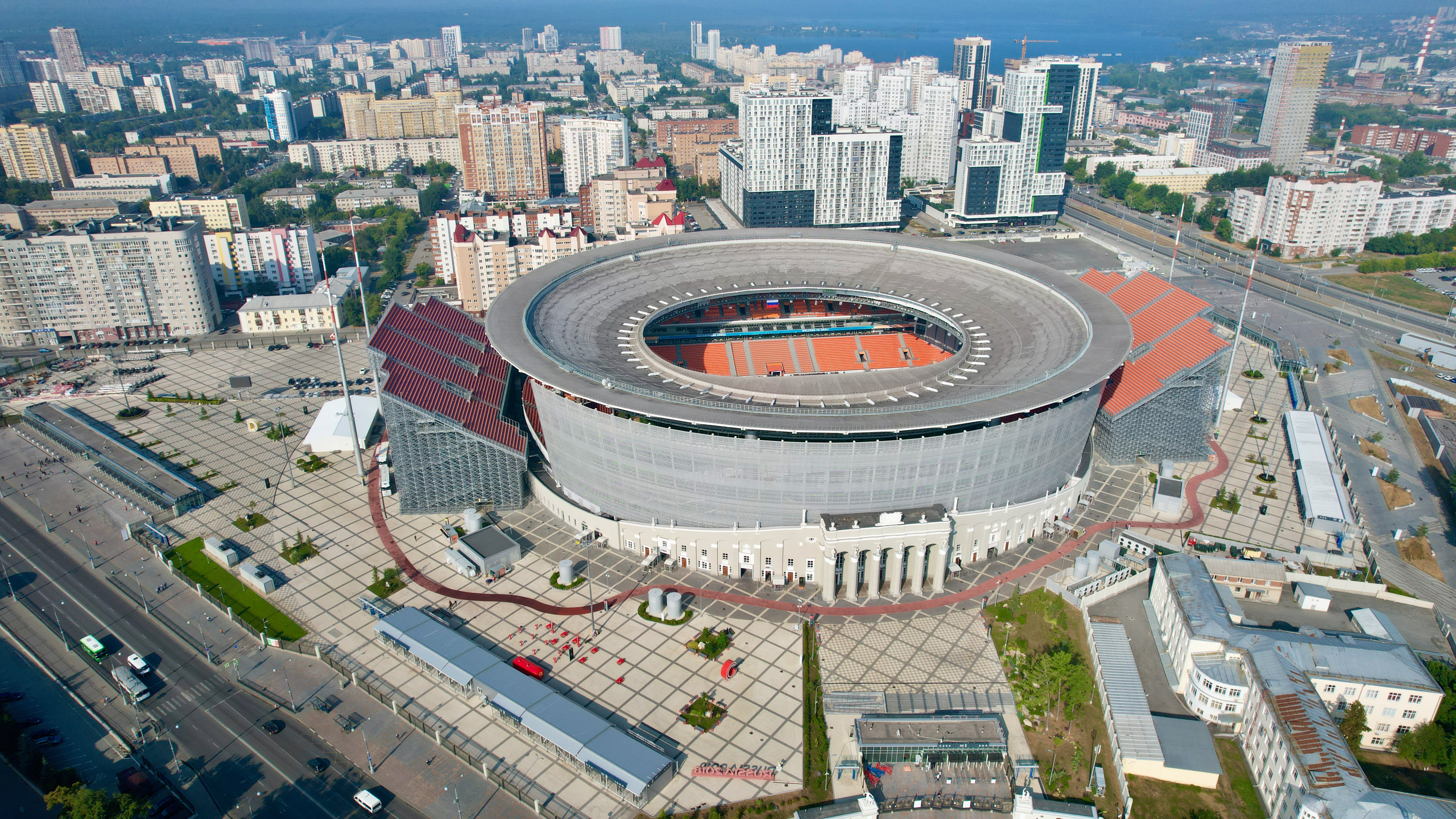
- UEFA
- Interactive map of Central Stadium
- Full name: Yekaterinburg Arena
- Location: Ulitsa Repina 5, Yekaterinburg, Russia
- Coordinates: 56°49′57″N 60°34′25″E
- Operator: FC Ural Yekaterinburg
- Capacity: 35,061
- Surface: Grass
- Field size: 105 by 68 m (344 by 223 ft)

Construction
- Built: 1957
- Renovated: 2006–2011; 2014–2017

Tenant
- FC Ural Yekaterinburg (1957–present)

Yekaterinburg Arena is a football stadium in the city of Yekaterinburg in Russia. It is the home ground of the Russian First League club FC Ural Yekaterinburg, the country's oldest football club. The capacity of the stadium is just over 35,000, though it could be reduced to 25,000 in the future. It was one of 12 venues in 11 host cities for the 2018 FIFA World Cup in Russia.

== History ==
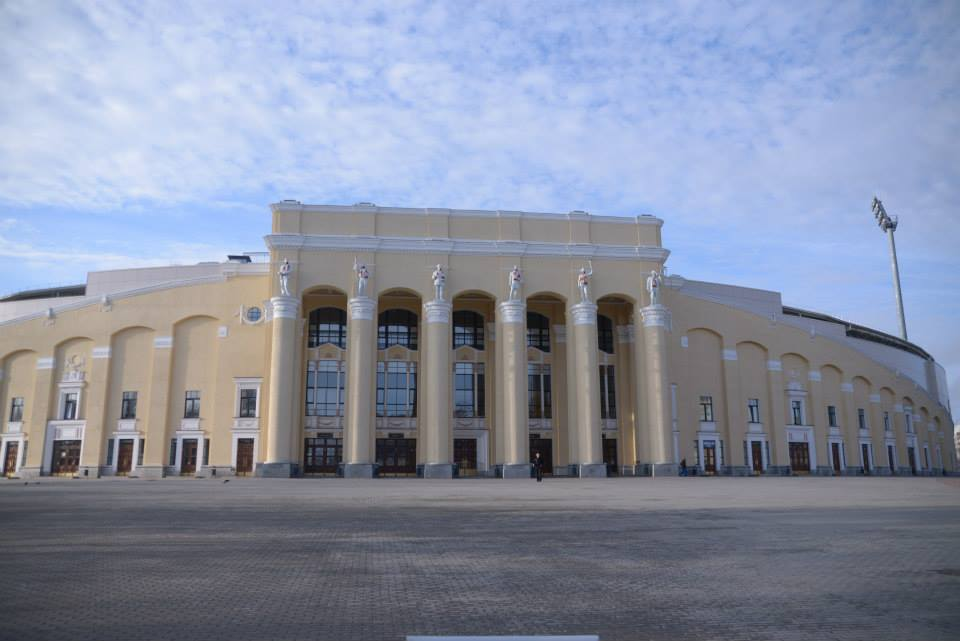
Stadium before the 2017 reconstruction

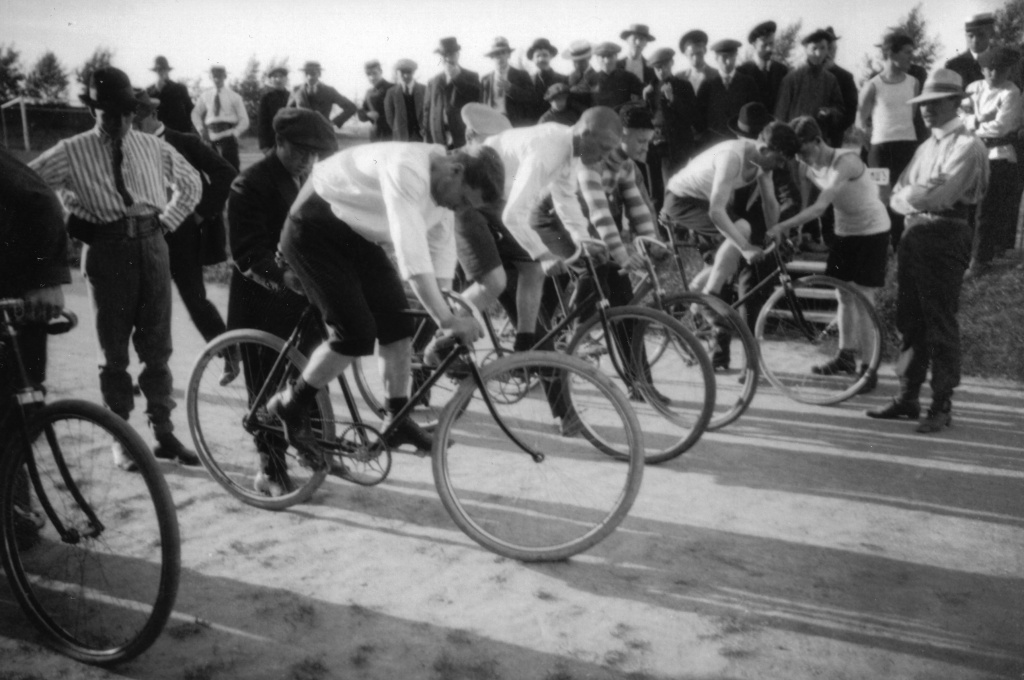
Velodrome in the outskirts of Yekaterinburg, 1913

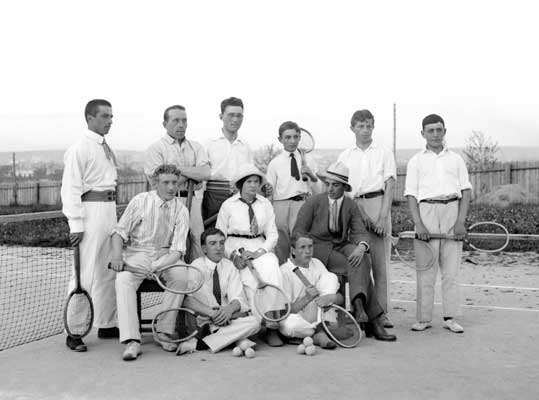
Tennis courts for the velodrome, 1913

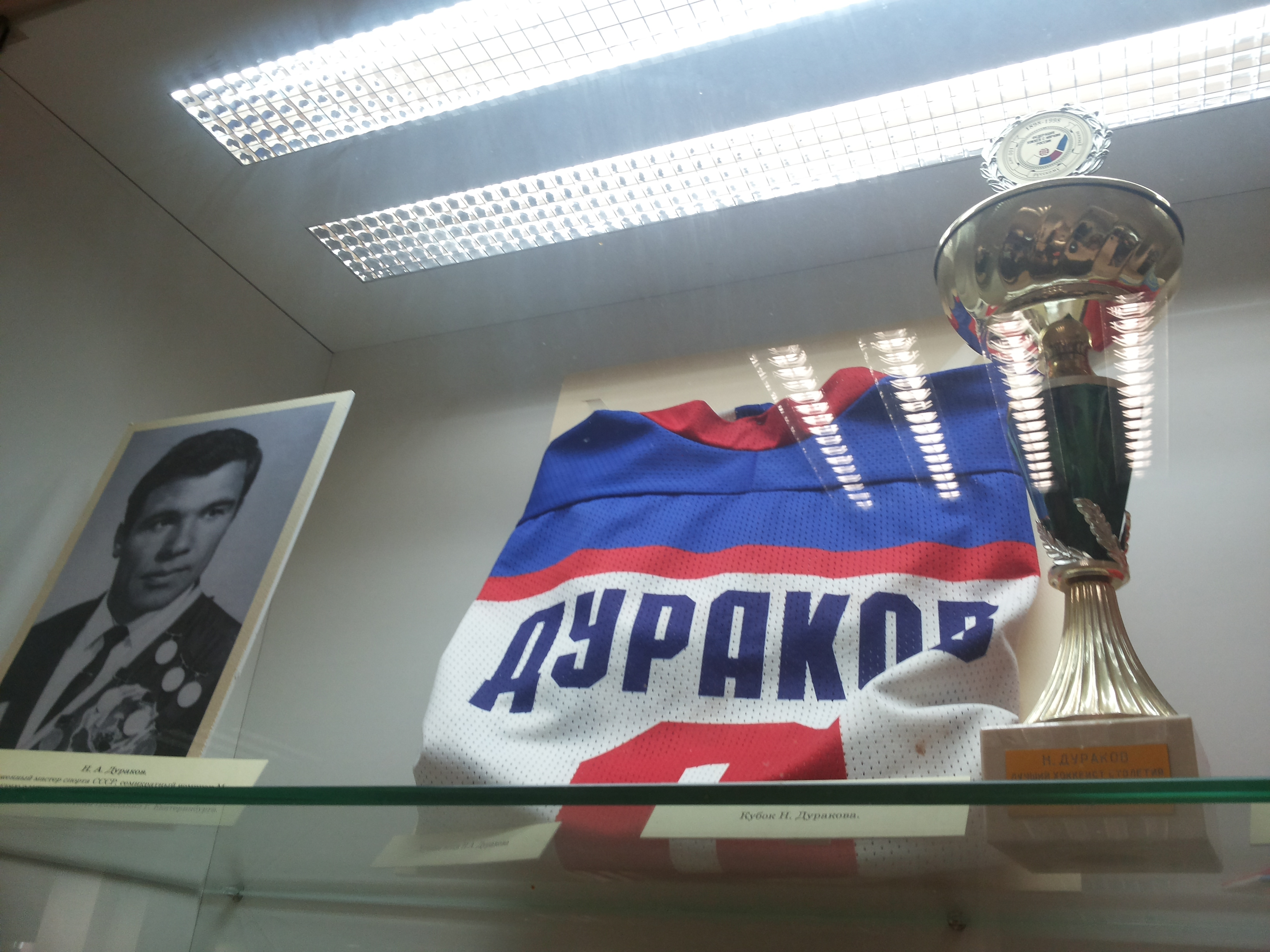
Honouring Nikolay Durakov

Central Stadium was built in 1957. Earlier on this territory of the city also were sports facilities: from 1900 - the Velodrome sponsored by merchant Kamaletdin Agafurov, from 1928 - Regional Stadium, and from 1936 - the stadium "Metallurg of the East". Following the demolition and reconstruction of the stadium in the 1950s due to fire safety regulations, the new stadium called "Central" was opened in 1957. The stadium was listed in the Top Ten list of sports facilities in the Soviet Union. The Stadium has hosted thousands of sports and entertainment events. In the first years after its opening, the stadium became one of the world's most important arenas of speed skating. In 1959, it held the World Allround Speed Skating Championships for Women, as well as the 1958, 1962, 1964, and 1966 championships of the USSR (with multiple world records made), and in the 1964-73 period many matches between the strongest national speed skating teams of the world (Soviet Union, Norway, Sweden and Finland). Approximately during the time when SKA-Sverdlovsk was one of the best club teams in the world. The stadium hosted the 1962, 1966, 1974 and 1978 Spartakiad of the Peoples of the USSR (contemporaneously these competitions were USSR championships) and other Russian and international competitions.

In 2004, the Stadium became a public company - JSC "Central Stadium" (in 2010 the shareholders - Sverdlovsk Oblast Ministry of assets - 25% plus 1 share, Administration of City Ekaterinburg - 25% plus 1 share, and of JSC "Sinara Group" - 50% minus 2 shares).

In May 2012, Central Stadium hosted the final match of the Russian Cup. The football match between Dynamo Moscow and FC Rubin Kazan was attended by 26,700 spectators. In May 2013, Central Stadium participated in the international action “Night of Museums”.

== Reconstruction ==
The capacity of the arena after the reconstruction was planned to be 35,000 spectators.

The kernel of the stadium will bring together a football field with natural turf size 105 by 68 metres (344 ft × 223 ft) and an athletic complex, consisting of eight racetracks, areas for long jump, triple jump and shot put. Grand Sports Arena (BSA) will conform to international standards of FIFA and UEFA, the Russian Athletics Federation, as well as international agencies, cultural events and concerts.

== Renovation for FIFA World Cup ==
As the stadium was chosen as one of the venues of the 2018 FIFA World Cup, temporary stands extending outside the original perimeter of the stadium were erected to comply with FIFA's minimum capacity requirement of 35,000 spectators at the time. The temporary seating also protects the historical façade of the monument of Stalinist neoclassicism. Following its removal, the seating was reduced to 35,000 seats.

In the stadium, it is planned to build a fitness center (2,500–3,000 square metres (27,000–32,000 sq ft)) and Valeological center (1,500 square metres (16,000 sq ft)), which will be an organized system of fast-food outlets to serve the audience.

In November 2010, the construction of reinforced concrete structures of two additional grandstands - the south and north - was finalized. Roofing work is finalized and closed the thermal path to the east and west stands. Work on the landscaping included lawns decorated, organized and paved parking for special mobile TV stations and specialized in the sports complex and complete reconstruction of the stadium's outer fence, which has retained its historic appearance. Preparatory work for the installation of spectator seating was also conducted. Stable funding to finish the stadium was provided in the summer of 2011. In October 2015 began another full reconstruction of the stadium.

For the World Cup, the stadium had a capacity of 35,696 spectators, 12,000 of which are temporary seating. After the World Cup, these 12,000 seats were set to be removed, reducing the capacity to around 23,000, but as of January 2021, the temporary stands have not been demolished. The temporary stands attracted international attention because of its "dangerous" appearance, extending out from the outer facade. Following its reconstruction, the first match was played on April 1, 2018, between home football club Ural and Rubin FC from Kazan.

The Central Stadium was set to host the opening and closing ceremonies of the 2023 Summer World University Games, but the games were cancelled due to the Russian invasion of Ukraine.

== 2018 FIFA World Cup ==
Date	Time	Team #1	Result	Team #2	Round	Attendance
15 June 2018	17:00 YEKT (UTC+5)	Egypt	0–1	Uruguay	Group A	27,015
21 June 2018	20:00 YEKT (UTC+5)	France	1–0	Peru	Group C	32,789
24 June 2018	20:00 YEKT (UTC+5)	Japan	2–2	Senegal	Group H	32,572
27 June 2018	19:00 YEKT (UTC+5)	Mexico	0–3	Sweden	Group F	33,061

== Security ==
Security of fans, athletes and staff is ensured by a ticket/pass entry system and a set of counter-terrorism measures. The arena is equipped with CROC systems and systems for engineering system and structural health monitoring (SMIS and SMIK). They provide a 24-hour dispatch service with real-time data about the facility.

== Gallery ==
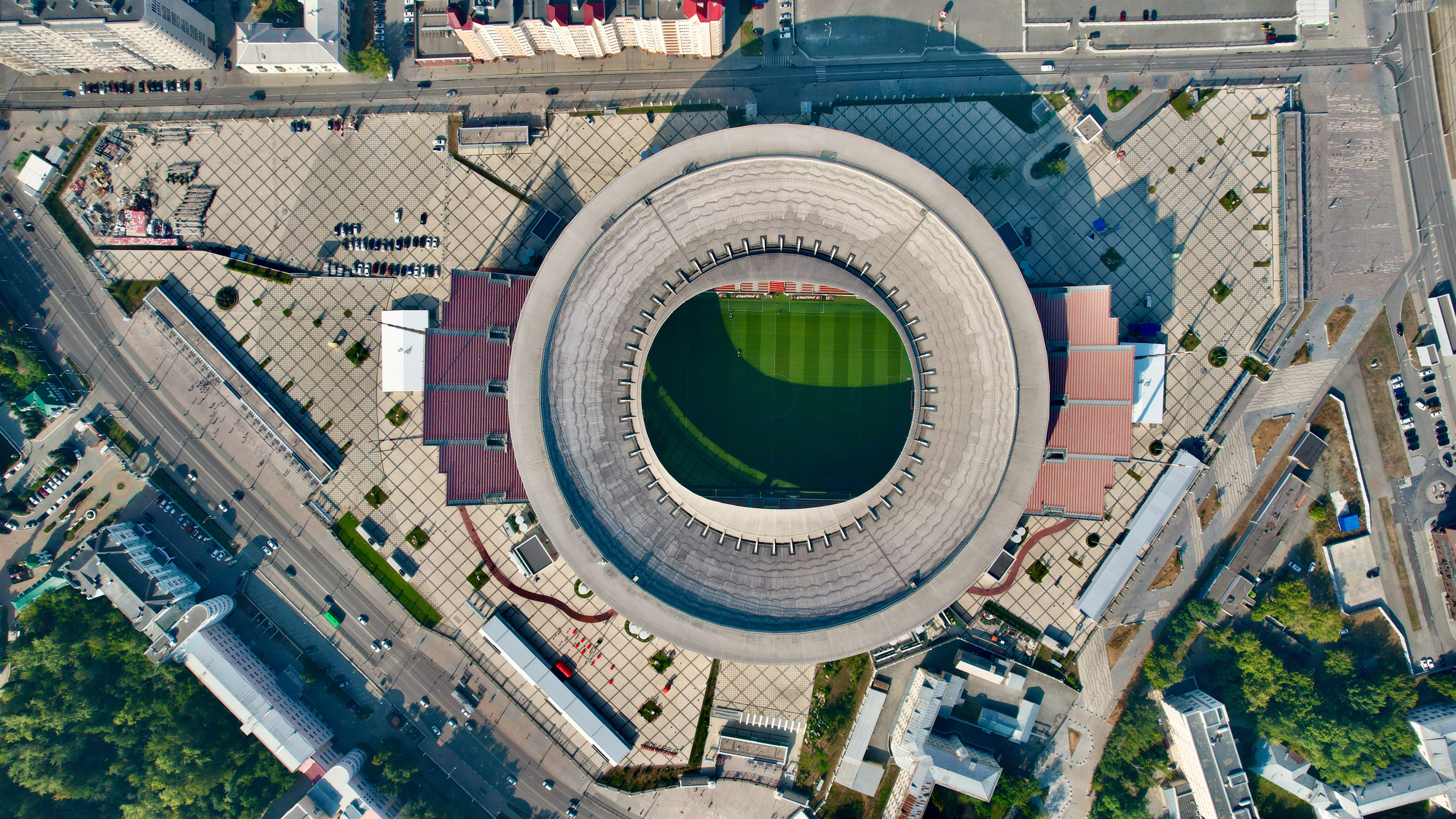
Overhead view

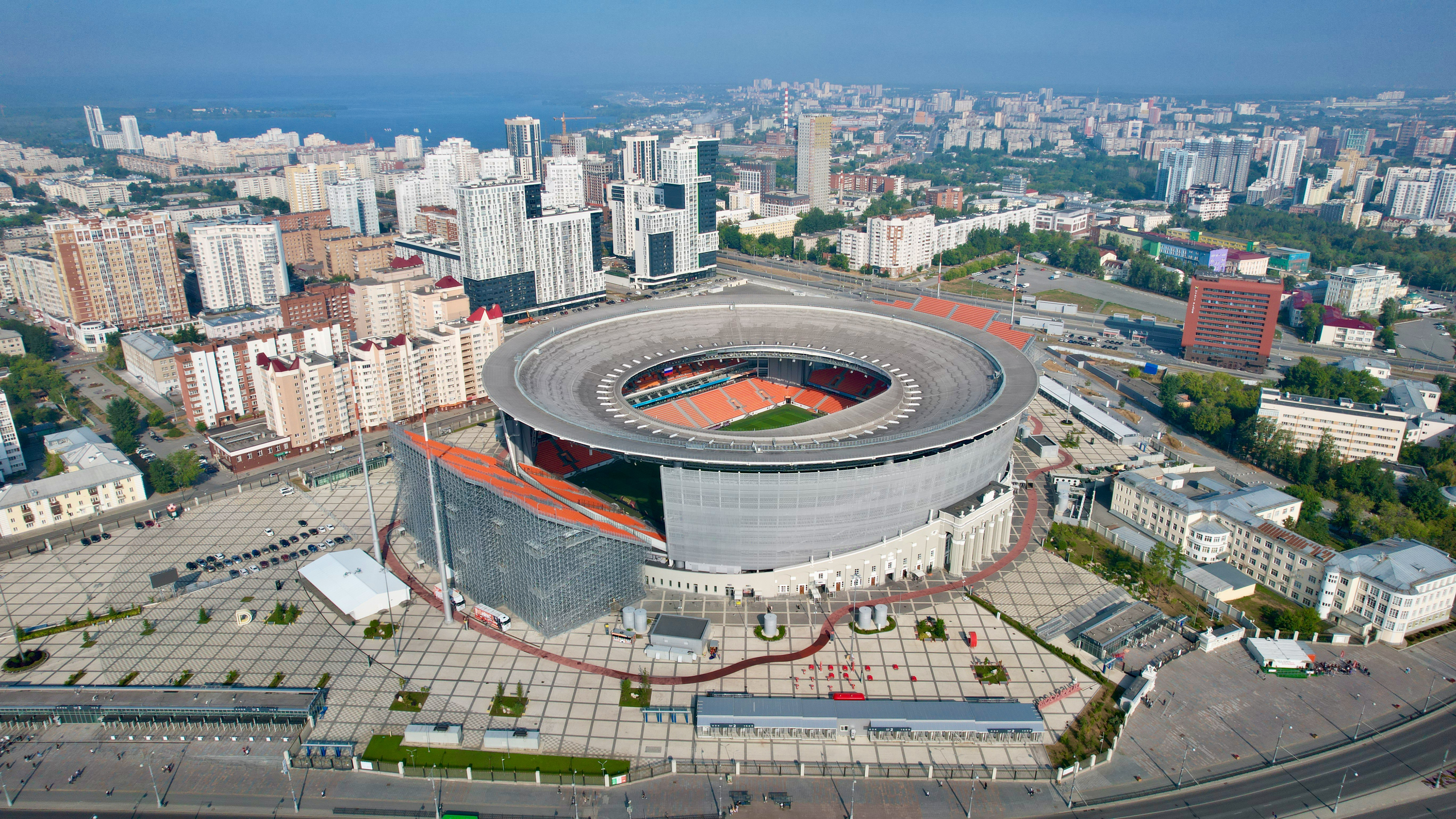

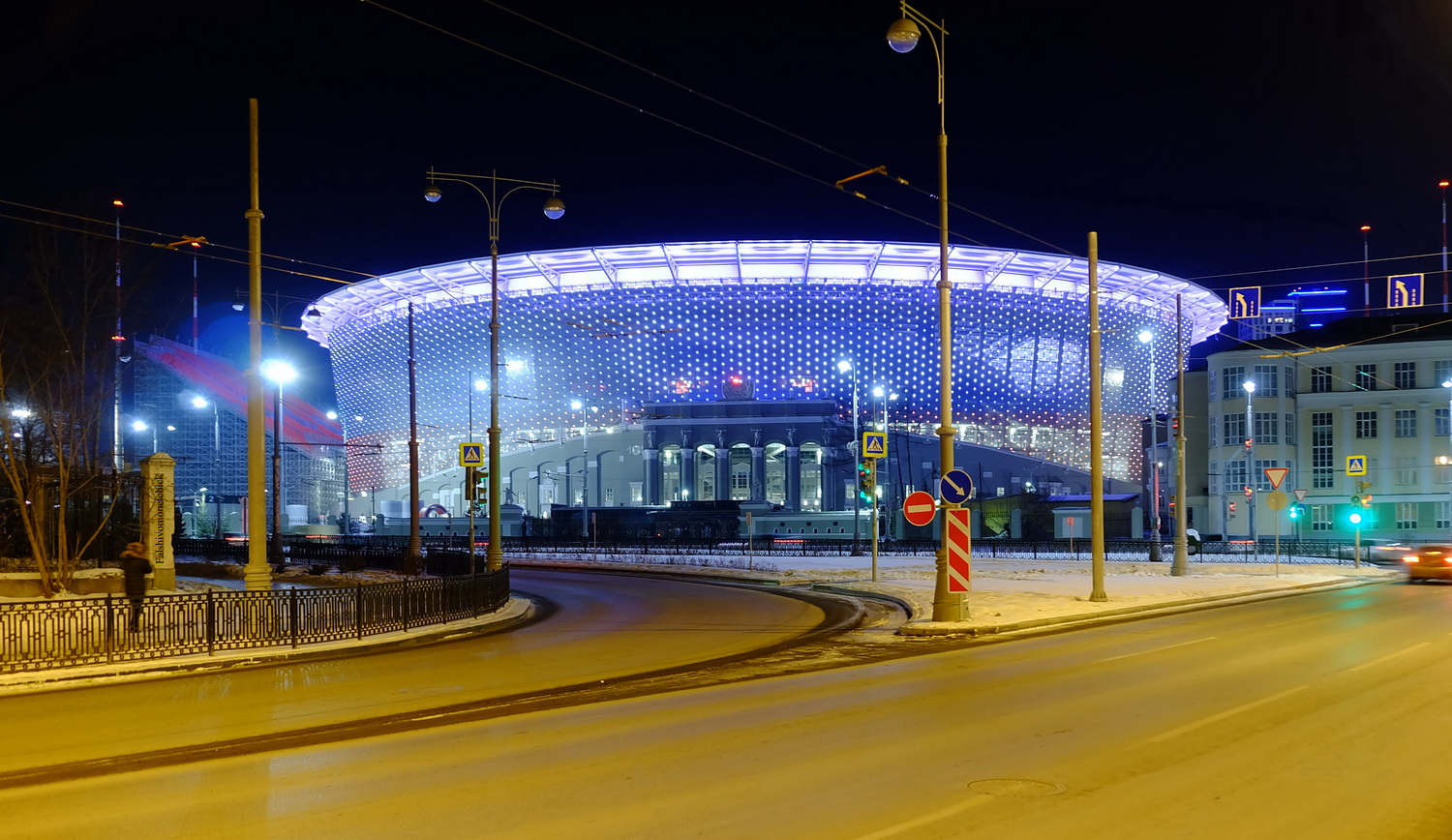
Night view (February 2018)

== See also ==
- List of football stadiums in Russia
- UMMC Arena
