= FC Ural-2 Yekaterinburg =

Russian football club

Ural-2 Yekaterinburg
- Full name: FC Ural-2 Yekaterinburg
- Founded: 1994; 32 years ago
- Ground: Bazhovia Base, Sysert
- Capacity: 500
- Chairman: Grigori Ivanov
- Manager: Yuri Matveyev
- League: Russian Second League, Division B, Group 4
- 2026: 11th
- Website: fc-ural.ru/ural-2/ofitsialnaya-stranitsa-kluba-ural-2

FC Ural-2 Yekaterinburg (Russian: ФК «Урал-2» (Екатеринбург)) is a Russian football team based in Yekaterinburg. It is the farm club for FC Ural Yekaterinburg. For 2017–18 season, it received the license for the third-tier Russian Professional Football League. Ural's second team previously played on the professional level as FC Uralmash-d Yekaterinburg in the Russian Third League from 1994 to 1996.

== Current squad ==
As of 14 September 2026, according to the official Second League website.

Note: Flags indicate national team as defined under FIFA eligibility rules; some limited exceptions apply. Players may hold more than one non-FIFA nationality.

No.	Pos.	Nation	Player
18	MF	RUS	Nikita Morozov
28	MF	RUS	Ilya Skoropupov
30	DF	RUS	Klimenty Sidorov
33	FW	RUS	Denis Gazhalov
35	DF	BLR	Dmitry Prishchepa
37	MF	RUS	Vitaly Bondarev
38	DF	RUS	Oleg Karagodin
39	MF	RUS	Artyom Galkin
40	MF	RUS	Nikita Khrisanfov
43	DF	RUS	Roman Shoronov
45	DF	RUS	Yury Mozzhukhin
47	MF	RUS	Artur Chelnov
48	FW	RUS	Ivan Metin
50	DF	RUS	Nikita Kazantsev
52	DF	RUS	Ilya Shakhmatov
55	MF	RUS	Danil Basyrov
56	MF	RUS	Timofey Kudymov
58	MF	RUS	Vladimir Santalov
61	MF	RUS	Ivan Alfyorov

No.	Pos.	Nation	Player
62	FW	RUS	Pavel Satuchin
67	GK	RUS	Yury Maleyev
69	DF	RUS	Artyom Fotin
70	FW	KAZ	Elaman Ospangali
73	DF	RUS	Nikita Lyzlov
74	MF	RUS	Dmitry Kiselyov
76	FW	RUS	Vitaly Nem
77	GK	RUS	Maksim Aleksandrov
79	GK	RUS	Raid Bikmukhametov
82	FW	RUS	Stanislav Bondarenko
84	MF	RUS	Leonid Belov
86	GK	RUS	Ivan Kuznetsov
87	MF	RUS	Artyom Akhmedyanov
88	FW	RUS	Artyom Krylovsky
90	MF	RUS	Tigran Arabachyan
91	DF	RUS	Artyom Baranov
92	DF	RUS	Ivan Ryzhkov
95	MF	RUS	Arman Manukyan
98	FW	RUS	Danil Zheludkov
