= 2017–18 FC Ural Yekaterinburg season =

Ural Yekaterinburg
2017–18 season
- Chairman: Grigori Ivanov
- Manager: Aleksandr Tarkhanov
- Stadium: SKB-Bank Arena
- Russian Premier League: 12th
- Russian Cup: Round of 32 vs Shinnik Yaroslavl
- Top goalscorer: League: Eric Bicfalvi (8); All: Eric Bicfalvi (8)
Home colours	Away colours	Third colours

The 2017–18 Ural season was the club's fifth successive season that the club played in the Russian Premier League, the highest tier of association football in Russia. Ural finished the season in twelfth place and were knocked out of the Russian Cup at the Round of 32 stage by Shinnik Yaroslavl.

== Squad ==
As of 22 February 2018

Note: Flags indicate national team as defined under FIFA eligibility rules; some limited exceptions apply. Players may hold more than one non-FIFA nationality.

No.	Pos.	Nation	Player
2	DF	RUS	Vladimir Khozin
3	DF	ARM	Varazdat Haroyan
4	DF	SLO	Gregor Balažic
5	DF	SRB	Dominik Dinga
6	MF	ROU	Eric Bicfalvi
7	DF	RUS	Aleksandr Dantsev
9	MF	GEO	Giorgi Chanturia
13	MF	CMR	Petrus Boumal
14	MF	RUS	Yuri Bavin
15	DF	UKR	Denys Kulakov
16	MF	RUS	Rezo Gavtadze
17	MF	BUL	Nikolay Dimitrov
18	FW	RUS	Vladimir Ilyin
21	MF	UKR	Dmytro Khomchenovskyi
27	DF	RUS	Mikhail Merkulov

No.	Pos.	Nation	Player
28	DF	RUS	Nikita Chernov (on loan from CSKA Moscow)
31	GK	UKR	Yaroslav Hodzyur
32	MF	RUS	Nikita Glushkov
44	MF	RUS	Andrei Yegorychev
57	MF	RUS	Artyom Fidler (captain)
58	MF	NED	Othman El Kabir
63	DF	RUS	Aleksei Gerasimov
66	DF	RUS	Mingiyan Beveyev
77	GK	RUS	Oleg Baklov
78	MF	RUS	Semyon Pomogayev
88	FW	RUS	Igor Portnyagin (on loan from Lokomotiv Moscow)
92	MF	RUS	Roman Yemelyanov
94	MF	RUS	Alexey Yevseyev
99	FW	ARM	Edgar Manucharyan

=== Out on loan ===
Note: Flags indicate national team as defined under FIFA eligibility rules; some limited exceptions apply. Players may hold more than one non-FIFA nationality.

No.	Pos.	Nation	Player
—	GK	RUS	Dmitri Arapov (on loan to Volgar Astrakhan)
—	GK	RUS	Andrei Timofeyev (on loan to Syzran-2003)
—	DF	RUS	Denis Fomin (on loan to Tekstilshchik Ivanovo)
—	DF	SRB	Radovan Pankov (on loan to AEK Larnaca)
—	MF	RUS	Dmitri Korobov (on loan to Avangard Kursk)

No.	Pos.	Nation	Player
—	MF	RUS	Aleksandr Lomakin (on loan to Yenisey Krasnoyarsk)
—	MF	RUS	Aleksandr Scherbakov (on loan to Alashkert)
—	MF	RUS	Sergei Serchenkov (on loan to Alashkert)
—	MF	RUS	Aleksandr Stavpets (on loan to Tyumen)
—	FW	RUS	Artyom Yusupov (on loan to Tyumen)

=== Youth team ===
As per Russian Football Premier League. Note: Flags indicate national team as defined under FIFA eligibility rules; some limited exceptions apply. Players may hold more than one non-FIFA nationality.

No.	Pos.	Nation	Player
22	DF	RUS	Kirill Kochnev
24	GK	RUS	Yevgeni Zharikov
29	FW	RUS	Elbeyi Guliyev
30	MF	RUS	Pavel Karpov
33	MF	RUS	Pavel Kirillov
34	MF	RUS	Yan Chizhkov
35	FW	RUS	Yevgeni Tatarinov
36	DF	RUS	Aleksei Fakhrutdinov
39	MF	RUS	Savva Knyazev
40	DF	RUS	Maksim Gorin
41	FW	RUS	Vladislav Pavlyuchenko
42	FW	RUS	Nikita Belous
43	MF	RUS	Aleksandr Golubtsov
46	MF	RUS	Vyacheslav Berdnikov
47	FW	RUS	Konstantin Reshetnikov
53	DF	RUS	Pavel Nedivomy
54	MF	RUS	Nikita Muromsky
55	GK	RUS	Aleksandr Medvedev
60	GK	RUS	Vladislav Poletayev
61	MF	RUS	Dmitry Makovsky
62	MF	RUS	Aleksandr Bunakov

No.	Pos.	Nation	Player
64	MF	RUS	Pavel Kobzev
65	MF	RUS	Aleksandr Galimov
69	MF	RUS	Andrey Sheptiy
71	GK	RUS	Aleksei Mamin
72	MF	RUS	Lev Tolkachyov
73	MF	RUS	Ilya Korelin
74	MF	RUS	Denis Novikov
76	DF	RUS	Yegor Badyin
81	MF	RUS	Ilya Nekrasov
83	DF	RUS	Gleb Geykin
84	DF	RUS	Nikita Beskrovny
85	MF	RUS	Danil Davletshin
86	MF	RUS	Maksim Prokopyev
87	MF	RUS	Eduard Valiakhmetov
91	GK	RUS	Aleksandr Shubin
93	DF	RUS	Denis Drozhalkin
95	MF	RUS	Andrei Tushkov
96	FW	RUS	Nikolai Sidorkin

== Transfers ==
=== Summer ===
In: Note: Flags indicate national team as defined under FIFA eligibility rules; some limited exceptions apply. Players may hold more than one non-FIFA nationality.

No.	Pos.	Nation	Player
3	DF	ARM	Varazdat Haroyan (from (Iran) Padideh)
13	MF	CMR	Petrus Boumal (from (Bulgaria) CSKA Sofia)
14	MF	RUS	Yuri Bavin (from (Russia) Zenit Saint Petersburg)
20	MF	RUS	Maksim Grigoryev (from (Russia) Rostov)
28	DF	RUS	Nikita Chernov (on loan from (Russia) CSKA Moscow)
31	GK	UKR	Yaroslav Hodzyur (from (Russia) Akhmat Grozny)
39	MF	RUS	Savva Knyazev
41	FW	RUS	Vladislav Pavlyuchenko (from (Russia) Progress Timashyovsk)
42	FW	RUS	Nikita Belous (from (Russia) Urozhay Yelan)
58	DF	RUS	Adessoye Oyewole (from (Russia) Orenburg)
58	MF	UKR	Dmytro Bilonoh (end of loan to (Ukraine) Zirka Kropyvnytskyi)
61	MF	RUS	Dmitry Makovsky
64	MF	RUS	Pavel Kobzev (from (Russia) Urozhay Yelan)
65	MF	RUS	Aleksandr Galimov
67	MF	RUS	Nikita Arsenyev (from (Russia) Orenburg)
74	DF	RUS	Aleksandr Kashkarov
78	MF	RUS	Semyon Pomogayev (from (Russia) Baltika Kaliningrad)
81	DF	RUS	Ilya Nekrasov
88	FW	RUS	Igor Portnyagin (on loan from (Russia) Lokomotiv Moscow)
94	MF	RUS	Alexey Yevseyev (from (Russia) Zenit Saint Petersburg)
95	MF	RUS	Andrei Tushkov

Out: Note: Flags indicate national team as defined under FIFA eligibility rules; some limited exceptions apply. Players may hold more than one non-FIFA nationality.

No.	Pos.	Nation	Player
3	DF	GEO	Jemal Tabidze (end of loan from (Belgium) Gent)
9	FW	RUS	Roman Pavlyuchenko (to (Russia) Ararat Moscow)
10	MF	ZAM	Chisamba Lungu (to (Turkey) Alanyaspor)
12	MF	RUS	Aleksandr Novikov (to (Russia) Yenisey Krasnoyarsk)
13	DF	SRB	Radovan Pankov (on loan to (Cyprus) AEK Larnaca)
14	FW	CIV	Jean-Jacques Bougouhi (to (Finland) HJK)
25	MF	RUS	Aleksandr Stavpets (on loan to (Russia) Tyumen)
28	GK	RUS	Nikolai Zabolotny
33	MF	RUS	Vartan Karkaryan
41	DF	RUS	Aleksei Gerasimov (on loan to (Russia) Tom Tomsk)
51	DF	RUS	Roman Shalin
58	FW	RUS	Bogdan Mishukov (to (Portugal) Leixões)
65	MF	RUS	Dmitri Khlyoskin
74	DF	RUS	Danil Chernov (to (Russia) Titan Klin)
77	MF	RUS	Dmitri Korobov (on loan to (Russia) Avangard Kursk)
79	FW	RUS	Artyom Yusupov (on loan to (Russia) Tyumen)
80	MF	RUS	Aleksandr Lomakin (on loan to (Russia) Yenisey Krasnoyarsk)
82	MF	RUS	Sergei Podoksyonov (on loan to (Russia) Zenit Penza)
85	MF	RUS	Sergei Serchenkov (on loan to (Russia) Orenburg)
87	MF	RUS	Rustam Nisafutdinov (to (Russia) Ural-2 Yekaterinburg)
93	FW	RUS	Lev Popov
—	DF	RUS	Ivan Chudin (to (Russia) Tyumen, previously on loan)

=== Winter ===
In: Note: Flags indicate national team as defined under FIFA eligibility rules; some limited exceptions apply. Players may hold more than one non-FIFA nationality.

No.	Pos.	Nation	Player
21	MF	UKR	Dmytro Khomchenovskyi (from (Poland) Jagiellonia Białystok)
30	MF	RUS	Pavel Karpov
44	MF	RUS	Andrei Yegorychev (from (Russia) Nosta Novotroitsk)
53	DF	RUS	Pavel Nedivomy
55	GK	RUS	Aleksandr Medvedev
58	MF	NED	Othman El Kabir (from (Sweden) Djurgården)
63	MF	RUS	Aleksei Gerasimov (end of loan to (Russia) Tom Tomsk)
66	MF	RUS	Mingiyan Beveyev (from (Russia) Nosta Novotroitsk)
72	MF	RUS	Lev Tolkachyov
74	MF	RUS	Denis Novikov
76	DF	RUS	Yegor Badyin
83	DF	RUS	Gleb Geykin
84	DF	RUS	Nikita Beskrovny
85	MF	RUS	Danil Davletshin
86	MF	RUS	Maksim Prokopyev
96	FW	RUS	Nikolai Sidorkin

Out: Note: Flags indicate national team as defined under FIFA eligibility rules; some limited exceptions apply. Players may hold more than one non-FIFA nationality.

No.	Pos.	Nation	Player
1	GK	RUS	Dmitri Arapov (on loan to (Russia) Volgar Astrakhan)
8	MF	RUS	Aleksandr Pavlenko (to (Russia) Tom Tomsk)
21	DF	RUS	Dmitri Borovkov (to (Russia) Kvant Obninsk)
30	MF	RUS	Maksim Yashkin
37	DF	RUS	Kirill Karabanov
38	FW	RUS	Vladislav Blinov
51	MF	RUS	Volodya Israelyan
55	DF	RUS	Pavel Vlasenko
58	MF	UKR	Dmytro Bilonoh (to (Ukraine) Zirka Kropyvnytskyi)
74	DF	RUS	Aleksandr Kashkarov
82	MF	RUS	Sergei Podoksyonov (released, previously on loan to (Russia) Zenit Penza)
90	MF	RUS	Aleksandr Scherbakov (on loan to (Armenia) Alashkert)
96	GK	RUS	Andrei Timofeyev (on loan to (Russia) Syzran-2003)
—	MF	RUS	Sergei Serchenkov (on loan to (Armenia) Alashkert, previously on loan to (Russia) Orenburg)

== Competitions ==
=== Russian Premier League ===
==== Results by round ====
Round	1	2	3	4	5	6	7	8	9	10	11	12	13	14	15	16	17	18	19	20	21	22	23	24	25	26	27	28	29	30
Ground	H	A	H	A	H	A	H	A	H	A	H	A	H	H	A	H	A	H	A	H	A	H	A	H	A	H	A	A	H	A
Result	D	W	D	D	D	D	D	L	D	W	W	L	W	W	D	D	L	L	L	D	L	L	W	D	D	W	W	D	L	L
Position	7	5	7	9	10	10	9	10	10	9	7	8	6	4	5	6	7	8	8	9	10	11	8	8	9	9	8	8	8	12

Updated to match(es) played on 13 May 2018. Source: See Results
A = Away; H = Home; W = Win; D = Draw; L = Loss

==== Results ====
15 July 2017 1	Ural Yekaterinburg	1 – 1	Rostov	Yekaterinburg
17:00 YEKT (UTC+5)	Dimitrov 41' (pen.)	Report	Ustinov (yellow card) 50'; Gațcan 60'; Yusupov (yellow card) 73'	Stadium: SKB-Bank Arena; Attendance: 6,846; Referee: Sergey Lapochkin

23 July 2017 2	Dynamo Moscow	0 – 1	Ural Yekaterinburg	Moscow
19:30 YEKT (UTC+5)		Report	Merkulov (yellow card) 57'; Chanturia 89'; Bavin (yellow card) 90+2'	Stadium: Arena Khimki; Attendance: 6,853; Referee: Vladimir Moskalyov

29 July 2017 3	Ural Yekaterinburg	1 – 1	Ufa	Yekaterinburg
17:00 YEKT (UTC+5)	Haroyan (yellow card) 47'; Yemelyanov (yellow card) 79'; Tabidze 88' (o.g.)	Report	Tumasyan (yellow card) 7'; Sly 17'	Stadium: SKB-Bank Arena; Attendance: 6,280; Referee: Sergei Karasev

6 August 2017 4	Krasnodar	1 – 1	Ural Yekaterinburg	Krasnodar
22:00 YEKT (UTC+5)	Granqvist 90+4' (pen.)	Report	Fidler (yellow card) 12'; Haroyan 15'	Stadium: Krasnodar Stadium; Attendance: 18,676; Referee: Aleksei Nikolaev

9 August 2017 5	Ural Yekaterinburg	1 – 1	Zenit St.Petersburg	Yekaterinburg
19:30 YEKT (UTC+5)	Bicfalvi 35'; Ilyin (yellow card) 77'	Report	Kokorin 60'; Neto (yellow card) 77'	Stadium: SKB-Bank Arena; Attendance: 8,965; Referee: Roman Galimov

14 August 2017 6	Arsenal Tula	2 – 2	Ural Yekaterinburg	Tula
21:30 YEKT (UTC+5)	Sunzu 5'; Maksimov 10'; Čaušić (yellow card) 18'; Shevchenko (yellow card) 90+2'	Report	Yemelyanov (yellow card) 37'; Bicfalvi 42' (yellow card) 79'; Yevseyev 69'; Bavin (yellow card) 77'	Stadium: Arsenal Stadium; Attendance: 10,050; Referee: Aleksey Sukhoy

19 August 2017 7	Ural Yekaterinburg	0 – 0	CSKA Moscow	Yekaterinburg
17:00 YEKT (UTC+5)	Yevseyev (yellow card) 89'	Report	Dzagoev (yellow card) 44'; Nababkin (yellow card) 64'	Stadium: SKB-Bank Arena; Attendance: 8,964; Referee: Sergey Lapochkin

26 August 2017 8	Lokomotiv Moscow	2 – 1	Ural Yekaterinburg	Moscow
20:00 YEKT (UTC+5)	Farfán 21'; Al.Miranchuk 56'	Report	Guilherme 32' (o.g.)	Stadium: RZD Arena; Attendance: 11,477; Referee: Vladimir Moskalyov

12 September 2017 9	Ural Yekaterinburg	1 – 1	SKA-Khabarovsk	Yekaterinburg
19:30 YEKT (UTC+5)	Haroyan (yellow card) 40'; Chanturia 54' (pen.)	Report	Gabulov (yellow card) 40'; Kazankov (yellow card) 44'; Dedechko (yellow card) 63'; Fedotov 75'	Stadium: SKB-Bank Arena; Attendance: 2,602; Referee: Kirill Levnikov

17 September 2017 10	Rubin Kazan	0 – 1	Ural Yekaterinburg	Kazan
18:30 YEKT (UTC+5)	Granat (yellow card) 63'	Report	Chanturia (yellow card) 32'; Bavin (yellow card) 62'; Bicfalvi 87'	Stadium: Kazan Arena; Attendance: 8,325; Referee: Sergei Karasev

24 September 2017 11	Ural Yekaterinburg	3 – 1	Tosno	Yekaterinburg
16:00 YEKT (UTC+5)	Chanturia 5' (pen.); Yevseyev 9'; Bicfalvi 55' (pen.); Boumal (yellow card) 90+3'; Manucharyan (yellow card) 90+3'	Report	Paliyenko (yellow card) 23'; Mirzov (yellow card) 30' (yellow-red card) 90+3'; Zabolotny (yellow card) 56'; Dugalić (yellow card) 76'; Poletanović (yellow card) 82'; Trujić 85'; Melkadze (yellow card) 90+2'	Stadium: SKB-Bank Arena; Attendance: 2,591; Referee: Evgeny Turbin

30 September 2017 12	Spartak Moscow	2 – 0	Ural Yekaterinburg	Moscow
21:00 YEKT (UTC+5)	Samedov 36'; Rocha 51'	Report	Boumal (yellow card) 22'; Balažic (yellow card) 31' (yellow-red card) 74'; Haroyan (yellow card) 67'	Stadium: Otkrytiye Arena; Attendance: 21,089; Referee: Vladislav Bezborodov

14 October 2017 13	Ural Yekaterinburg	2 – 1	Anzhi Makhachkala	Yekaterinburg
18:30 YEKT (UTC+5)	Haroyan (yellow card) 49'; Bicfalvi 56'; Kulakov (yellow card) 69'; Glushkov (yellow card) 82'; Ilyin 87'; Hodzyur (yellow card) 90+2'	Report	Yakovlev (yellow card) 57'; Khubulov (yellow card) 67'; Tetrashvili (yellow card) 69'; Bryzgalov 89'	Stadium: SKB-Bank Arena; Attendance: 3,609; Referee: Roman Galimov

22 October 2017 14	Ural Yekaterinburg	2 – 0	Akhmat Grozny	Yekaterinburg
16:00 YEKT (UTC+5)	Boumal (yellow card) 26'; Dimitrov 33'; Balažic (yellow card) 53'; Ilyin (yellow card) 58'; Yevseyev 79'	Report	Shvets (yellow card) 5'; Semyonov (yellow card) 55'; Berisha (yellow card) 86'	Stadium: SKB-Bank Arena; Attendance: 2,386; Referee: Alexey Nikolaev

29 October 2017 15	Amkar Perm	1 – 1	Ural Yekaterinburg	Perm
13:30 YEKT (UTC+5)	Sivakow 22' (pen.); Ogude (yellow card) 77'	Report	Ilyin (yellow card) 23'; Yevseyev 48'	Stadium: Zvezda Stadium; Attendance: 4,870; Referee: Igor Fedotov

3 November 2017 16	Ural Yekaterinburg	2 – 2	Dynamo Moscow	Yekaterinburg
19:30 YEKT (UTC+5)	Balažic 17', 90+1'; Boumal (yellow card) 32'; Bavin (yellow card) 40'; Kulakov (yellow card) 64'; Fidler (yellow card) 68'	Report	Holmén (yellow card) 41'; Šunjić 49'; Terekhov 74'	Stadium: SKB-Bank Arena; Attendance: 3,815; Referee: Sergey Ivanov

19 November 2017 17	Ufa	2 – 0	Ural Yekaterinburg	Ufa
13:30 YEKT (UTC+5)	Stotsky 28'; Sysuyev (yellow card) 30'; Krotov 58'; Zhivoglyadov 73'; Nikitin (yellow card) 86'	Report	Balažic (yellow card) 27'; Bicfalvi (penalty missed) 87'	Stadium: Neftyanik Stadium; Attendance: 6,309; Referee: Pavel Kukuyan

26 November 2017 18	Ural Yekaterinburg	0 – 1	Krasnodar	Yekaterinburg
13:30 YEKT (UTC+5)	Merkulov (yellow card) 71'	Report	Smolov 34'	Stadium: SKB-Bank Arena; Referee: Vladimir Moskalyov

2 December 2017 19	Zenit St.Petersburg	2 – 1	Ural Yekaterinburg	Saint Petersburg
16:00 YEKT (UTC+5)	Portnyagin 31' (o.g.); Criscito (yellow card) 45+1'; Yerokhin (yellow card) 53'; Kokorin 76' (yellow card) 76'	Report	Mammana 6' (o.g.); Bavin (yellow card) 68'; Yemelyanov (yellow card) 69'; Ilyin (yellow card) 75'; Merkulov (yellow card) 80'	Stadium: Krestovsky Stadium; Attendance: 43,921; Referee: Sergey Karasev

8 December 2017 20	Ural Yekaterinburg	1 – 1	Arsenal Tula	Yekaterinburg
19:30 YEKT (UTC+5)	Portnyagin 30'; Haroyan (yellow card) 87'	Report	Sunzu (yellow card) 57'; Đorđević 73'	Stadium: SKB-Bank Arena; Attendance: 1,345; Referee: Vitaly Meshkov

3 March 2018 21	CSKA Moscow	1 – 0	Ural Yekaterinburg	Moscow
14:00 YEKT (UTC+5)	Dzagoev 59'	Report	Ilyin (yellow card) 49'	Stadium: VEB Arena; Attendance: 8,500; Referee: Artem Chistyakov

12 March 2018 22	Ural Yekaterinburg	0 – 2	Lokomotiv Moscow	Yekaterinburg
19:00 YEKT (UTC+5)	Yemelyanov (yellow card) 57'; Balažic (yellow card) 58'; Boumal (yellow card) 65'; Chanturia (yellow card) 75'	Report	An.Miranchuk 11'; Fernandes 15' (pen.); Lysov (yellow card) 42'; Kvirkvelia (yellow card) 61'	Stadium: SKB-Bank Arena; Attendance: 5,500; Referee: Vladimir Moskalyov

17 March 2018 23	SKA-Khabarovsk	0 – 3	Ural Yekaterinburg	Khabarovsk
13:00 YEKT (UTC+5)	Balyaikin (yellow card) 21'	Report	Fidler (yellow card) 12'; Ilyin 26', 89'; Bicfalvi (yellow card) 50'; El Kabir 72'	Stadium: Lenin Stadium; Attendance: 3,821; Referee: Igor Fedotov

1 April 2018 24	Ural Yekaterinburg	1 – 1	Rubin Kazan	Yekaterinburg
16:00 YEKT (UTC+5)	Bicfalvi (yellow card) 65' (yellow-red card) 88' (goal) 73'; Dimitrov (penalty missed) 73'; Yevseyev (yellow card) 76'; Kulakov (yellow card) 85'	Report	Popov 34'; Navas (yellow card) 64'; Kudryashov (yellow card) 68'	Stadium: SKB-Bank Arena; Attendance: 18,218; Referee: Sergey Ivanov

8 April 2018 25	Tosno	2 – 2	Ural Yekaterinburg	Saint Petersburg
16:00 YEKT (UTC+5)	Pogrebnyak 6', 59' (pen.) (yellow card) 36'; Zhigulyov (yellow card) 72'	Report	Boumal (yellow card) 36'; Ilyin 40'; Balažic (yellow card) 68'; Yegorychev (yellow card) 72'; El Kabir 87'	Stadium: Petrovsky Stadium; Attendance: 3,552; Referee: Artem Chistyakov

15 April 2018 26	Ural Yekaterinburg	2 – 1	Spartak Moscow	Yekaterinburg
16:00 YEKT (UTC+5)	Bicfalvi 37'; Portnyagin (yellow card) 86'; El Kabir 88'	Report	Zé Luís (yellow card) 19'; Kutepov (yellow card) 74'; Promes 90+1'	Stadium: Central Stadium; Attendance: 26,868; Referee: Vladislav Bezborodov

21 April 2018 27	Anzhi Makhachkala	0 – 1	Ural Yekaterinburg	Kaspiysk
21:00 YEKT (UTC+5)	Samardžić (yellow card) 11'; Markelov (yellow card) 57'; Kalmykov (yellow card) 90'	Report	Haroyan (yellow card) 28'; El Kabir (yellow card) 37'; Yemelyanov (yellow card) 40'; Bicfalvi 84'	Stadium: Anzhi Arena; Attendance: 9,500; Referee: Kirill Levnikov

30 April 2018 28	Akhmat Grozny	0 – 0	Ural Yekaterinburg	Grozny
18:30 YEKT (UTC+5)		Report	Boumal (yellow card) 32'; Merkulov (yellow card) 39' (yellow-red card) 88'	Stadium: Akhmat-Arena; Attendance: 12,235; Referee: Aleksey Eskov

6 May 2018 29	Ural Yekaterinburg	0 – 2	Amkar Perm	Yekaterinburg
16:00 YEKT (UTC+5)	Dantsev (yellow card) 7'; Bicfalvi (yellow card) 15' (penalty missed) 78'; Boumal (yellow card) 54'	Report	Zanev 44' (yellow card) 57'; Gol (yellow card) 62'; Olanare (yellow card) 80'; Miljković (yellow card) 85'; Forbes 90+4'	Stadium: SKB-Bank Arena; Attendance: 20,800; Referee: Vitaly Meshkov

13 May 2018 30	Rostov	1 – 0	Ural Yekaterinburg	Rostov-on-Don
16:00 YEKT (UTC+5)	Ionov 57'	Report	Fidler (yellow card) 41'; Haroyan (yellow card) 88'	Stadium: Rostov Arena; Attendance: 37,483; Referee: Mikhail Vilkov

==== League table ====
Pos	Team	Pld	W	D	L	GF	GA	GD	Pts	Qualification or relegation
10	Rubin Kazan	30	9	11	10	32	25	+7	38	
11	Rostov	30	9	10	11	27	28	−1	37 (Note: Head-to-head: Rostov 1–0 Ural, Ural 1–1 Rostov)	
12	Ural Yekaterinburg	30	8	13	9	31	32	−1	37	
13	Amkar Perm (D)	30	9	8	13	20	30	−10	35	Dissolved after the season (Note: On 13 June 2018, FC Amkar Perm announced that the Russian Football Union recalled their 2018–19 season license, making them ineligible for the Russian Premier League or Russian Football National League. On 18 June 2018, club president Gennadi Shilov announced that the club will not register for the third-tier Russian Professional Football League and will be dissolved. As a consequence, Anzhi Makhachkala was not relegated.)
14	Anzhi Makhachkala	30	6	6	18	31	55	−24	24 (Note: Head-to-head: Anzhi 2–0 Tosno, Tosno 2–2 Anzhi)	Qualification for the Relegation play-offs

Updated to match(es) played on 13 May 2018. Source: Russian Premier League, Soccerway
Rules for classification: 1) Points; 2) Head-to-head points; 3) Head-to-head matches won; 4) Head-to-head goal difference; 5) Head-to-head goals scored; 6) Head-to-head away goals; 7) Matches won; 8) Goal difference; 9) Goals scored; 10) Away goals scored.
(D) Dissolved after the season

=== Russian Cup ===
20 September 2017 Round of 32	Shinnik Yaroslavl	3 – 0	Ural Yekaterinburg	Karavaevo
17:00 YEKT (UTC+5)	Fatikhov 8' (yellow card) 26'; Zemskov (yellow card) 33'; Bezlikhotnov 44'; Kramarenko 56'	Report	Chernov (yellow card) 54'; Kulakov (yellow card) 55'; Boumal (yellow card) 68'	Stadium: Stadion Urozhay; Attendance: 1,500; Referee: Igor Panin

== Squad statistics ==
As of Match played 13 May 2018

=== Appearances and goals ===
No.	Pos	Nat	Player	Total		Premier League		Russian Cup	
No.	Pos	Nat	Player	Apps	Goals	Apps	Goals	Apps	Goals
3	DF	(Armenia) ARM	Varazdat Haroyan	20	1	19+1	1	0	0
4	DF	(Slovenia) SLO	Gregor Balažic	20	2	19+1	2	0	0
5	DF	(Serbia) SRB	Dominik Dinga	5	0	3+1	0	1	0
6	MF	(Romania) ROU	Eric Bicfalvi	26	8	26	8	0	0
7	DF	(Russia) RUS	Aleksandr Dantsev	12	0	8+3	0	1	0
9	FW	(Georgia (country)) GEO	Giorgi Chanturia	18	3	9+9	3	0	0
11	FW	(Russia) RUS	Aleksandr Stavpets	1	0	1	0	0	0
13	MF	(Cameroon) CMR	Petrus Boumal	20	0	18+1	0	0+1	0
14	MF	(Russia) RUS	Yuri Bavin	18	0	13+4	0	1	0
15	DF	(Ukraine) UKR	Denys Kulakov	31	0	30	0	1	0
17	MF	(Bulgaria) BUL	Nikolay Dimitrov	25	2	25	2	0	0
18	FW	(Russia) RUS	Vladimir Ilyin	25	4	20+5	4	0	0
20	MF	(Russia) RUS	Maksim Grigoryev	7	0	6+1	0	0	0
27	DF	(Russia) RUS	Mikhail Merkulov	26	0	22+3	0	0+1	0
28	DF	(Russia) RUS	Nikita Chernov	14	0	12+1	0	1	0
31	GK	(Ukraine) UKR	Yaroslav Hodzyur	30	0	30	0	0	0
32	MF	(Russia) RUS	Nikita Glushkov	9	0	2+6	0	1	0
35	FW	(Russia) RUS	Yevgeni Tatarinov	1	0	0	0	1	0
44	MF	(Russia) RUS	Andrei Yegorychev	5	0	2+3	0	0	0
57	MF	(Russia) RUS	Artyom Fidler	22	0	14+8	0	0	0
58	MF	(Netherlands) NED	Othman El Kabir	10	3	10	3	0	0
79	FW	(Russia) RUS	Artyom Yusupov	1	0	0+1	0	0	0
88	FW	(Russia) RUS	Igor Portnyagin	12	1	3+9	1	0	0
92	MF	(Russia) RUS	Roman Yemelyanov	26	0	22+3	0	1	0
94	MF	(Russia) RUS	Alexey Yevseyev	21	4	12+8	4	1	0
99	FW	(Armenia) ARM	Edgar Manucharyan	6	0	1+5	0	0	0
Players away from the club on loan:
1	GK	(Russia) RUS	Dmitri Arapov	1	0	0	0	1	0
90	MF	(Russia) RUS	Aleksandr Scherbakov	1	0	0	0	1	0
Players who appeared for Ural Yekaterinburg no longer at the club:
8	MF	(Russia) RUS	Aleksandr Pavlenko	1	0	0	0	1	0
10	MF	(Zambia) ZAM	Chisamba Lungu	5	0	3+2	0	0	0

=== Goal scorers ===
Place	Position	Nation	Number	Name	Premier League	Russian Cup	Total
1	MF	(Romania)	6	Eric Bicfalvi	8	0	8
2	MF	(Russia)	94	Alexey Yevseyev	4	0	4
2	FW	(Russia)	18	Vladimir Ilyin	4	0	4
4	FW	(Georgia (country))	9	Giorgi Chanturia	3	0	3
4	MF	(Netherlands)	58	Othman El Kabir	3	0	3
4				Own goal	3	0	3
7	MF	(Bulgaria)	17	Nikolay Dimitrov	2	0	2
7	DF	(Slovenia)	4	Gregor Balažic	2	0	2
9	DF	(Armenia)	3	Varazdat Haroyan	1	0	1
9	FW	(Russia)	88	Igor Portnyagin	1	0	1
				TOTALS	31	0	31

=== Disciplinary record ===
Number	Nation	Position	Name	Premier League		Russian Cup		Total	
Number	Nation	Position	Name	Yellow card	Red card	Yellow card	Red card	Yellow card	Red card
3	(Armenia)	DF	Varazdat Haroyan	7	0	0	0	7	0
4	(Slovenia)	DF	Gregor Balažic	6	1	0	0	6	1
6	(Romania)	MF	Eric Bicfalvi	5	1	0	0	5	1
7	(Russia)	DF	Aleksandr Dantsev	1	0	0	0	1	0
9	(Georgia (country))	FW	Giorgi Chanturia	2	0	0	0	2	0
13	(Cameroon)	MF	Petrus Boumal	8	0	1	0	9	0
14	(Russia)	MF	Yuri Bavin	5	0	0	0	5	0
15	(Ukraine)	DF	Denys Kulakov	3	0	1	0	4	0
18	(Russia)	FW	Vladimir Ilyin	5	0	0	0	5	0
27	(Russia)	DF	Mikhail Merkulov	5	1	0	0	5	1
28	(Russia)	DF	Nikita Chernov	0	0	1	0	1	0
31	(Ukraine)	GK	Yaroslav Hodzyur	1	0	0	0	1	0
32	(Russia)	MF	Nikita Glushkov	1	0	0	0	1	0
44	(Russia)	MF	Andrei Yegorychev	1	0	0	0	1	0
57	(Russia)	MF	Artyom Fidler	4	0	0	0	4	0
58	(Netherlands)	MF	Othman El Kabir	1	0	0	0	1	0
88	(Russia)	FW	Igor Portnyagin	1	0	0	0	1	0
92	(Russia)	MF	Roman Yemelyanov	5	0	0	0	5	0
94	(Russia)	MF	Alexey Yevseyev	2	0	0	0	2	0
99	(Armenia)	FW	Edgar Manucharyan	1	0	0	0	1	0
			TOTALS	64	3	3	0	67	3
