= 2019–20 FC Ural Yekaterinburg season =

Ural Yekaterinburg
2019–20 season
- Chairman: Grigori Ivanov
- Manager: Dmytro Parfenov
- Stadium: Central Stadium
- Premier League: 11th
- Russian Cup: Semifinal vs Khimki
- Top goalscorer: League: Eric Bicfalvi (8); All: Eric Bicfalvi (8)
Home colours	Away colours

The 2019–20 Ural season was the club's seventh successive season that the club played in the Russian Premier League, the highest tier of association football in Russia.

== Season review ==
On 17 March, the Russian Premier League postponed all league fixtures until April 10 due to the COVID-19 pandemic.

On 1 April, the Russian Football Union extended the suspension of football until 31 May.

On 15 May, the Russian Football Union announced that the Russian Premier League season would resume on 21 June.

On 1 July, the Russian Premier League announced that that afternoon's game between Orenburg and Ural Yekaterinburg had been called off due to an outbreak of COVID-19 within the Orenburg squad.

== Squad ==
As of 18 February 2020

Note: Flags indicate national team as defined under FIFA eligibility rules; some limited exceptions apply. Players may hold more than one non-FIFA nationality.

No.	Pos.	Nation	Player
2	DF	RUS	Shamsiddin Shanbiyev
3	DF	ARM	Varazdat Haroyan
4	DF	RUS	Artyom Mamin
5	DF	POL	Maciej Wilusz
6	MF	POL	Rafał Augustyniak
8	MF	RUS	Roman Yemelyanov
10	MF	ROU	Eric Bicfalvi
11	MF	RUS	Dmitry Yefremov
13	MF	CMR	Petrus Boumal
14	MF	RUS	Yuri Bavin
15	DF	UKR	Denys Kulakov
17	MF	BUL	Nikolay Dimitrov
18	MF	POL	Michał Kucharczyk
19	DF	BLR	Dzyanis Palyakow
20	FW	RUS	Andrei Panyukov
21	DF	RUS	Islamzhan Nasyrov
25	DF	RUS	Ivan Kuzmichyov

No.	Pos.	Nation	Player
27	DF	RUS	Mikhail Merkulov
31	GK	RUS	Yaroslav Hodzyur
35	DF	BLR	Nikolay Zolotov
44	MF	RUS	Andrei Yegorychev
57	MF	RUS	Artyom Fidler (captain)
58	MF	NED	Othman El Kabir
60	GK	RUS	Vladislav Poletayev
65	MF	RUS	Aleksandr Galimov
69	MF	RUS	Artyom Shabolin
77	GK	RUS	Oleg Baklov
79	FW	RUS	Artyom Yusupov
88	FW	RUS	Pavel Pogrebnyak
90	MF	RUS	Aleksandr Shcherbakov
93	DF	RUS	Aleksei Gerasimov
95	DF	RUS	Ihor Kalinin (on loan from Dynamo Moscow)
99	FW	RUS	Yevgeni Tatarinov

=== Out on loan ===
Note: Flags indicate national team as defined under FIFA eligibility rules; some limited exceptions apply. Players may hold more than one non-FIFA nationality.

No.	Pos.	Nation	Player
50	DF	RUS	Nikita Chistyakov (at Chayka Peschanokopskoye)
—	DF	SRB	Dominik Dinga (at Partizan)

No.	Pos.	Nation	Player
—	MF	RUS	Aleksandr Lomakin (at Yenisey Krasnoyarsk)
—	MF	SUI	Marco Aratore (at Lugano)

== Transfers ==
=== In ===
Date	Position	Nationality	Name	From	Fee	Ref.
Summer 2019	GK	(Russia)	Sergei Dudin		Free	
Summer 2019	GK	(Russia)	Ilya Ignatyev		Free	
Summer 2019	MF	(Russia)	Anatoli Anisimov	CSKA Moscow	Free	
Summer 2019	MF	(Russia)	Aleksandr Nekrasov	Zenit St.Petersburg	Undisclosed	
Summer 2019	MF	(Russia)	Maksim Kryukov		Free	
21 June 2019	DF	(Russia)	Nikita Chistyakov	Anzhi Makhachkala	Undisclosed	
21 June 2019	MF	(Poland)	Rafał Augustyniak	Miedź Legnica	Undisclosed	
27 June 2019	FW	(Russia)	Andrei Panyukov	Zenit St.Petersburg	Undisclosed	
27 June 2019	MF	(Russia)	Artyom Shabolin	Nosta Novotroitsk	Undisclosed	
22 July 2019	MF	(Poland)	Michał Kucharczyk	Legia Warsaw	Undisclosed	
24 July 2019	DF	(Russia)	Islamzhan Nasyrov	Nosta Novotroitsk	Undisclosed	
7 August 2019	DF	(Russia)	Artyom Mamin	Spartak Moscow	Undisclosed	
23 December 2019	DF	(Belarus)	Nikolay Zolotov	Vitebsk	Undisclosed	
16 January 2020	DF	(Poland)	Maciej Wilusz	Rostov	Free	
18 February 2020	MF	(Russia)	Dmitry Yefremov	CSKA Moscow	Free	
15 June 2020	FW	(Russia)	David Karayev	KAMAZ Naberezhnye Chelny	Undisclosed	

=== Loans in ===
Date from	Position	Nationality	Name	From	Date to	Ref.
21 February 2020	DF	(Russia)	Ihor Kalinin	Dynamo Moscow	End of Season	

=== Out ===
Date	Position	Nationality	Name	To	Fee	Ref.
Summer 2019	DF	(Russia)	Sergei Bryzgalov	Fakel Voronezh	Undisclosed	
3 July 2019	DF	(Russia)	Vladimir Khozin	Nizhny Novgorod	Undisclosed	
Winter 2020	DF	(Russia)	Mingiyan Beveyev	KAMAZ Naberezhnye Chelny	Undisclosed	
7 January 2020	FW	(Russia)	Vladimir Ilyin	Akhmat Grozny	Undisclosed	
9 June 2020	DF	(Russia)	Mikhail Merkulov	Rubin Kazan	Undisclosed	
4 July 2020	MF	(Russia)	Aleksandr Lomakin	Yenisey Krasnoyarsk	Undisclosed	
17 July 2020	MF	(Russia)	Nikita Glushkov	Yenisey Krasnoyarsk	Undisclosed	
21 July 2020	MF	(Russia)	Aleksandr Galimov	Yenisey Krasnoyarsk	Undisclosed	

=== Loans out ===
Date from	Position	Nationality	Name	To	Date to	Ref.
14 June 2019	DF	(Serbia)	Dominik Dinga	Partizan	End of Season	
19 June 2019	MF	(Russia)	Aleksandr Lomakin	Yenisey Krasnoyarsk	End of Season	
10 July 2019	MF	(Switzerland)	Marco Aratore	Lugano	End of Season	
11 July 2019	FW	(Russia)	Yevgeni Tatarinov	Torpedo Moscow	11 January 2020	
4 February 2020	DF	(Russia)	Nikita Chistyakov	Chayka Peschanokopskoye	End of Season	

=== Released ===
Date	Position	Nationality	Name	Joined	Date
Summer 2019	DF	(Russia)	Yegor Badyin		
7 June 2019	DF	(Slovenia)	Gregor Balažic	Enosis Neon Paralimni	
7 June 2019	DF	(Russia)	Aleksandr Dantsev	Retired	
7 June 2019	MF	(Russia)	Anatoli Katrich	Luch Vladivostok	
10 June 2020	FW	(Bulgaria)	Nikolay Dimitrov	Retired	
24 July 2020	DF	(Poland)	Maciej Wilusz	Raków Częstochowa	4 August 2020
24 July 2020	MF	(Poland)	Michał Kucharczyk	Pogoń Szczecin	6 August 2020
24 July 2020	FW	(Russia)	Pavel Pogrebnyak	Ural Yekaterinburg	16 October 2020
25 July 2020	GK	(Russia)	Davyd Alekseyev		
25 July 2020	GK	(Russia)	Sergei Dudin		
25 July 2020	GK	(Russia)	Ilya Ignatyev		
25 July 2020	GK	(Russia)	Vladimir Kutyryov		
25 July 2020	GK	(Russia)	Aleksandr Medvedev		
25 July 2020	DF	(Belarus)	Dzyanis Palyakow		
25 July 2020	DF	(Russia)	Arsen Agakhanov		
25 July 2020	DF	(Russia)	Gleb Geykin		
25 July 2020	DF	(Russia)	Kirill Gurov		
25 July 2020	DF	(Russia)	Andrei Khityayev		
25 July 2020	DF	(Russia)	Ivan Lyubukhin		
25 July 2020	DF	(Russia)	Mikhail Merkulov	Rubin Kazan	
25 July 2020	DF	(Russia)	Pavel Nevidomy		
25 July 2020	DF	(Russia)	Shamsiddin Shanbiyev		
25 July 2020	MF	(Russia)	Aleksei Bulka		
25 July 2020	MF	(Russia)	Ilya Bykovsky		
25 July 2020	MF	(Russia)	Yan Chizhkov		
25 July 2020	MF	(Russia)	Artyom Fidler	Retired	
25 July 2020	MF	(Russia)	Ilya Korelin		
25 July 2020	MF	(Russia)	Vasili Koryukov		
25 July 2020	MF	(Russia)	Maksim Kryukov	Khimik-Arsenal	
25 July 2020	MF	(Russia)	Konstantin Malitskiy		
25 July 2020	MF	(Russia)	Aleksandr Nekrasov		
25 July 2020	MF	(Russia)	Ilya Nekrasov		
25 July 2020	MF	(Russia)	Maksim Prokopyev		
25 July 2020	MF	(Russia)	Konstantin Sysoyev		
25 July 2020	MF	(Russia)	Lev Tolkachyov		
25 July 2020	MF	(Russia)	Aleksandr Volchkov	Krylia Sovetov-2 Samara	
25 July 2020	MF	(Russia)	Maks Zhestaryov		
25 July 2020	FW	(Russia)	Igor Voronin		
25 July 2020	FW	(Russia)	Danil Vorobyov		

== Friendlies ==
19 January 2020	Raków Częstochowa (Poland)	1 – 3	(Russia) Ural Yekaterinburg	Paphos, Cyprus
19:00 YEKT (UTC+5)	Jach 53'	Report	Kucharczyk 7'; Zhamaletdinov 51'; Shabolin 58'

26 January 2020	Tsarsko Selo Sofia (Bulgaria)	1 – 0	(Russia) Ural Yekaterinburg	Paphos, Cyprus
19:00 YEKT (UTC+5)	Anderson 61'	Report

2 February 2020	Ararat-Armenia	1 – 1	(Russia) Ural Yekaterinburg	Paphos, Cyprus
20:00 YEKT (UTC+5)	Otubanjo 26'	Report	Bicfalvi 36' (pen.)

4 February 2020	Čukarički (Serbia)	1 – 1	(Russia) Ural Yekaterinburg	Paphos, Cyprus
20:00 YEKT (UTC+5)		Report

12 February 2020	Ural Yekaterinburg (Russia)	2 – 4	(Sweden) Brage	Larnaca, Cyprus
15:00 YEKT (UTC+5)	D.Novikov 48'; Tatarinov 60' (pen.)	Report	N.Williams 8'; Kouakou 36' (pen.), 77'; N.Kashaev 79'

12 February 2020	Ural Yekaterinburg	1 – 0	Tekstilshchik Ivanovo	Paphos, Cyprus
20:00 YEKT (UTC+5)	Panyukov 85'	Report		Stadium: Peyia Stadium

19 February 2020	Ural Yekaterinburg (Russia)	1 – 1	(Latvia) Riga	Paphos, Cyprus
20:00 YEKT (UTC+5)	Panyukov 89'	Report	Goal	Stadium: Peyia Stadium

== Competitions ==
=== Premier League ===
==== Results by round ====
Round	1	2	3	4	5	6	7	8	9	10	11	12	13	14	15	16	17	18	19	20	21	22	23	24	25	26	27	28	29	30
Ground	H	H	A	H	A	H	H	H	A	A	H	H	A	A	H	A	H	A	A	A	A	A	H	H	A	A	H	A	H	H
Result	W	W	L	D	L	L	W	L	W	D	L	L	W	D	L	D	D	D	W	D	L	L	L	W	W	D	W	L	L	L
Position	2	1	5	6	9	9	8	8	8	6	7	9	7	6	9	9	8	10	9	7	9	10	12	10	9	9	8	8	11	11

Updated to match(es) played on 22 July 2020. Source: See Results
A = Away; H = Home; W = Win; D = Draw; L = Loss

==== Results ====
13 July 2019 1	Ural Yekaterinburg	3 – 2	Ufa	Yekaterinburg
18:30 YEKT (UTC+5)	Bicfalvi 14', 49'; Bavin 81'	Report	Sysuyev (yellow card) 58'; Kozlov 76'; Fomin 86' (pen.)	Stadium: Central Stadium; Attendance: 14,614; Referee: Sergei Karasev

21 July 2019 2	Ural Yekaterinburg	3 – 0	Akhmat Grozny	Yekaterinburg
16:00 YEKT (UTC+5)	Boumal (yellow card) 19'; Ilyin 45+2'; El Kabir 58'; Bavin 78'	Report	Szymański (yellow card) 56'	Stadium: Central Stadium; Attendance: 15,611; Referee: Aleksey Sukhoy

26 July 2019 3	Dynamo Moscow	2 – 0	Ural Yekaterinburg	Moscow
22:00 YEKT (UTC+5)	Yusupov 16'; Panchenko 31'; Kaboré (yellow card) 39'; Rykov (yellow card) 59'	Report	Haroyan (yellow card) 56'	Stadium: VTB Arena; Attendance: 12,349; Referee: Pavel Kukuyan

3 August 2019 4	Ural Yekaterinburg	2 – 2	Rostov	Yekaterinburg
16:00 YEKT (UTC+5)	Panyukov 14'; Haroyan (yellow card) 20'; Yemelyanov (yellow card) 52'; Ilyin 81'; Bavin (yellow card) 88'	Report	Normann (yellow card) 44'; Shomurodov (yellow card) 60' (goal) 67'; Sigurðarson 85'	Stadium: Central Stadium; Attendance: 18,199; Referee: Stanislav Vasilyev

11 August 2019 5	Lokomotiv Moscow	4 – 0	Ural Yekaterinburg	Moscow
18:30 YEKT (UTC+5)	Smolov 17' (yellow card) 19'; Zhemaletdinov 28'; Krychowiak 76'; Al.Miranchuk 78'	Report	Fidler (yellow card) 16'; Yemelyanov (yellow card) 35'; Palyakow (yellow card) 50'	Stadium: RZD Arena; Attendance: 14,181; Referee: Nikolay Voloshin

17 August 2019 6	Ural Yekaterinburg	1 – 3	Krylia Sovetov	Yekaterinburg
16:00 YEKT (UTC+5)	Yemelyanov (yellow card) 30' (yellow-red card) 67'; Panyukov (yellow card) 81' (goal) 90+3'; Kulakov (yellow card) 88'	Report	Gînsari (yellow card) 16' (goal) 28'; Kombarov (yellow card) 45+2'; Kabutov (yellow card) 69'; Sobolev 79'; Radonjić 84'	Stadium: Central Stadium; Attendance: 22,304; Referee: Sergey Ivanov

26 August 2019 7	Ural Yekaterinburg	3 – 1	Sochi	Yekaterinburg
20:00 YEKT (UTC+5)	Bicfalvi 16' (pen.); Haroyan (yellow card) 45+2'; Panyukov 73'; Dimitrov (yellow card) 79' (goal) 84'	Report	Nabiullin (yellow card) 37'; A.Zabolotny 43'	Stadium: Central Stadium; Attendance: 10,171; Referee: Sergei Karasev

1 September 2019 8	Ural Yekaterinburg	2 – 4	Krasnodar	Yekaterinburg
16:00 YEKT (UTC+5)	Bavin 21'; El Kabir 68'; Boumal (yellow card) 82'	Report	Skopintsev 19'; Ari 38'; Olsson (yellow card) 59'; Utkin 80'; Wanderson 82'; Petrov (yellow card) 90+3'	Stadium: Central Stadium; Attendance: 18,388; Referee: Aleksey Sukhoy

14 September 2019 9	Spartak Moscow	1 – 2	Ural Yekaterinburg	Moscow
16:30 YEKT (UTC+5)	Gigot 12' (yellow card) 84'; Til (yellow card) 64'; Rasskazov (yellow card) 90+1'	Report	El Kabir (yellow card) 42' (goal) 60'; Ilyin 48'; Augustyniak (yellow card) 55'; Haroyan (yellow card) 69'	Stadium: Otkritie Arena; Attendance: 24,198; Referee: Sergey Ivanov

22 September 2019 10	Arsenal Tula	1 – 1	Ural Yekaterinburg	Tula
18:30 YEKT (UTC+5)	Gorbatenko (yellow card) 3'; Bauer 25'	Report	Augustyniak 48'; El Kabir (penalty missed) 76'; Ilyin (yellow card) 90+3'	Stadium: Arsenal Stadium; Attendance: 7,256; Referee: Vitali Meshkov

29 September 2019 11	Ural Yekaterinburg	0 – 3	CSKA Moscow	Yekaterinburg
13:30 YEKT (UTC+5)	Yemelyanov (yellow card) 75'	Report	Magnússon 17'; Sigurðsson (yellow card) 52' (goal) 57'; Bijol 65'; Chalov (penalty missed) 76'	Stadium: Central Stadium; Attendance: 20,130; Referee: Pavel Kukuyan

6 October 2019 12	Ural Yekaterinburg	1 – 3	Zenit St.Petersburg	Yekaterinburg
13:30 YEKT (UTC+5)	Shatov 58' (o.g.)	Report	Ivanović 3'; Ozdoyev 27'; Azmoun 63'	Stadium: Central Stadium; Attendance: 22,432; Referee: Nikolay Voloshin

19 October 2019 13	Tambov	1 – 2	Ural Yekaterinburg	Saransk
16:00 YEKT (UTC+5)	Obukhov 61' (pen.)	Report	Haroyan (yellow card) 13' (goal) 76'; Bicfalvi (yellow card) 70'; Ilyin 73'; Boumal (yellow card) 90+1'	Stadium: Mordovia Arena; Attendance: 1,883; Referee: Igor Panin
Note: Match played at the Mordovia Arena in Saransk instead of Tambov's regular Spartak Stadium.

25 October 2019 14	Rubin Kazan	0 – 0	Ural Yekaterinburg	Kazan
21:30 YEKT (UTC+5)	Pliyev (yellow card) 53'; Sorokin (yellow card) 78'; Kvaratskhelia (yellow card) 90+3'	Report	Kulakov (yellow card) 27'; Ilyin (yellow card) 65'; Fidler (yellow card) 77'; Palyakow (yellow card) 90+1'	Stadium: Central Stadium; Attendance: 5,086; Referee: Vitaly Meshkov

4 November 2019 15	Ural Yekaterinburg	1 – 2	Orenburg	Yekaterinburg
16:00 YEKT (UTC+5)	Haroyan (yellow card) 57'; Bicfalvi 64'; El Kabir (yellow card) 83'	Report	Fameyeh 4'; Ayupov (yellow card) 7'; Alves 45+1'; Terekhov (yellow card) 72'	Stadium: Central Stadium; Attendance: 6,797; Referee: Stanislav Vasilyev

8 November 2019 16	Akhmat Grozny	0 – 0	Ural Yekaterinburg	Grozny
21:30 YEKT (UTC+5)	Gigolayev (yellow card) 47'; Shvets (yellow card) 61'	Report		Stadium: Akhmat-Arena; Attendance: 12,474; Referee: Sergey Ivanov

24 November 2019 17	Ural Yekaterinburg	0 – 0	Spartak Moscow	Yekaterinburg
16:00 YEKT (UTC+5)	Ilyin (yellow card) 59'	Report	Umyarov (yellow card) 58'	Stadium: Central Stadium; Attendance: 14,637; Referee: Nikolay Voloshin

30 November 2019 18	Rostov	0 – 0	Ural Yekaterinburg	Rostov-on-Don
16:30 YEKT (UTC+5)	Kozlov (yellow card) 41'; Logashov (yellow card) 62'	Report	Fidler (yellow card) 67'; Palyakow (yellow card) 70'; Yegorychev (yellow card) 84'; Ilyin (yellow card) 90+2'	Stadium: Rostov Arena; Attendance: 11,309; Referee: Aleksey Sukhoy

8 December 2019 19	Krylia Sovetov	2 – 3	Ural Yekaterinburg	Samara
16:00 YEKT (UTC+5)	Chernov 21'; Mijailović (yellow card) 63'; Radonjić 64'; Anyukov (yellow card) 79'; Sobolev (yellow card) 87'	Report	Fidler (yellow card) 26'; Pogrebnyak 43', 50'; Haroyan (yellow card) 53'; El Kabir 83'; Merkulov (yellow card) 90+3'	Stadium: Samara Arena; Attendance: 5,196; Referee: Igor Panin

29 February 2020 20	CSKA Moscow	1 – 1	Ural Yekaterinburg	Moscow
16:00 YEKT (UTC+5)	Fernandes 90+1'	Report	Palyakow (yellow card) 14'; Bicfalvi (yellow card) 53' (goal) 72'	Stadium: VEB Arena; Attendance: 14,008; Referee: Pavel Kukuyan

8 March 2020 21	Sochi	2 – 0	Ural Yekaterinburg	Sochi
18:30 YEKT (UTC+5)	Mostovoy 35'; Zaika 63'; Tsallagov (yellow card) 90'	Report	Boumal (yellow card) 70'; Bicfalvi (yellow card) 87'	Stadium: Fisht Olympic Stadium; Attendance: 5,051; Referee: Mikhail Vilkov

14 March 2020 22	Zenit St.Petersburg	7 – 1	Ural Yekaterinburg	Saint Petersburg
18:30 YEKT (UTC+5)	Azmoun 8', 15', 61'; Dzyuba 12', 72' (pen.); Malcom 27'; Driussi 69'	Report	Kalinin (yellow card) 62'; Panyukov 65' (pen.)	Stadium: Krestovsky Stadium; Attendance: 33,677; Referee: Vladimir Moskalev

20 June 2020 23	Ural Yekaterinburg	1 – 2	Rubin Kazan	Yekaterinburg
16:00 YEKT (UTC+5)	Pablo 7' (o.g.); El Kabir (yellow card) 37'; Bavin (yellow card) 78'; Yemelyanov (yellow card) 85'	Report	Kvaratskhelia 39'; Mogilevets (yellow card) 48'; Bakayev 56'; Podberyozkin (red card) 71'; Dyupin (yellow card) 89'	Stadium: Central Stadium; Referee: Vasili Kazartsev
Note: Match originally scheduled for 21 March, but postponed on 17 March due to the COVID-19 pandemic.

28 June 2020 24	Ural Yekaterinburg	2 – 1	Tambov	Yekaterinburg
18:30 YEKT (UTC+5)	Boumal (yellow card) 15'; Bicfalvi 20' (pen.), 70' (yellow card) 82' (yellow-red card) 82'; Zolotov (yellow card) 38'; Bavin (yellow card) 50'; Yegorychev (yellow card) 51'; Augustyniak (yellow card) 63'	Report	Kostyukov 68'; Melkadze (yellow card) 79'; Ciupercă (yellow card) 90+2'; Mamtov (yellow card) 90+3'; Filin (yellow card) 90+4'	Stadium: Central Stadium; Referee: Aleksei Matyunin
Note: Match originally scheduled for 5 April, but postponed on 17 March due to the COVID-19 pandemic.

1 July 2020 25	Orenburg	0 – 3	Ural Yekaterinburg	Orenburg
17:00 YEKT (UTC+5)				Stadium: Gazovik Stadium
Note: Match originally scheduled for 11 April, but postponed on 1 April due to the COVID-19 pandemic. Match postponed again on 1 July due to an outbreak of COVID-19 in the Orenburg squad, and was awarded as a 3-0 victory to Ural.

5 July 2020 26	Ufa	1 – 1	Ural Yekaterinburg	Ufa
18:30 YEKT (UTC+5)	Urunov (yellow card) 33'; Nedelcearu (yellow card) 39' (yellow-red card) 65'; Terentyev (yellow card) 49' (goal) 90+3'; Jokić (yellow card) 65'; Putsko (yellow card) 80'	Report	Kalinin (yellow card) 60'; El Kabir 66'; Boumal (yellow card) 71'	Stadium: Neftyanik Stadium; Referee: Sergey Lapochkin
Note: Match originally scheduled for 18 April, but postponed on 1 April due to the COVID-19 pandemic.

9 July 2020 27	Ural Yekaterinburg	2 – 1	Dynamo Moscow	Yekaterinburg
19:00 YEKT (UTC+5)	El Kabir 22'; Boumal (yellow card) 51'; Kulakov (yellow card) 89'; Pogrebnyak 90+2' (yellow card) 90+4'	Report	Igboun (yellow card) 29'; Yemelyanov 31' (o.g.); Sosnin (yellow card) 42'; Neustädter (yellow card) 83'	Stadium: Central Stadium; Referee: Vladimir Moskalev
Note: Match originally scheduled for 26 April, but postponed on 1 April due to the COVID-19 pandemic.

12 July 2020 28	Krasnodar	3 – 0	Ural Yekaterinburg	Krasnodar
22:30 YEKT (UTC+5)	Berg 13'; Kaio (yellow card) 40'; Fernandes 57'; Sorokin (yellow card) 77'; Cabella 82' (pen.)	Report	Kalinin (yellow card) 12'; Zolotov (yellow card) 81'	Stadium: Krasnodar Stadium; Referee: Kirill Levnikov
Note: Match originally scheduled for 1 May, but postponed on 1 April due to the COVID-19 pandemic.

15 July 2020 29	Ural Yekaterinburg	1 – 3	Arsenal Tula	Yekaterinburg
18:00 YEKT (UTC+5)	Kulakov (yellow card) 32'; Bicfalvi 38'; Zolotov (yellow card) 73'; Pogrebnyak (yellow card) 86'	Report	Khlusevich 13' (yellow card) 45+4'; Khagush (yellow card) 53'; K.Kangwa (yellow card) 56'; Panteleyev 74'; Čaušić (yellow card) 86'; Lomovitsky (yellow card) 88'; Banda (yellow card) 90+1'; Tkachyov 90+4' (yellow card) 90+5'	Stadium: Central Stadium; Referee: Nikolay Voloshin
Note: Match originally scheduled for 6 May, but postponed on 1 April due to the COVID-19 pandemic.

22 July 2020 30	Ural Yekaterinburg	0 – 1	Lokomotiv Moscow	Yekaterinburg
21:00 YEKT (UTC+5)	Magomadov (yellow card) 14'; Boumal (yellow card) 19'; Augustyniak (yellow card) 31'; El Kabir (yellow card) 32'; Yemelyanov (yellow card) 47'	Report	An.Miranchuk 45+1' (yellow card) 78' (yellow-red card) 90+1'; Rybchinsky (yellow card) 51'; Zhivoglyadov (yellow card) 86'; Farfán (yellow card) 90'	Stadium: Central Stadium; Referee: Stanislav Vasilyev
Note: Match originally scheduled for 17 May, but postponed on 1 April due to the COVID-19 pandemic.

==== League table ====
Pos	Team	Pld	W	D	L	GF	GA	GD	Pts
9	Ufa	30	8	14	8	22	24	−2	38 (Note: Head-to-head points: Arsenal Tula 4, Ufa 1)
10	Rubin Kazan	30	8	11	11	18	28	−10	35 (Note: Head-to-head points: Rubin Kazan 4, Ural 1)
11	Ural	30	9	8	13	36	53	−17	35
12	Sochi	30	8	9	13	40	39	+1	33
13	Akhmat Grozny	30	7	10	13	27	46	−19	31 (Note: Head-to-head points: Akhmat Grozny 8, Tambov 4, Krylia Sovetov Samara 4. Head-to-head goal difference: Akhmat Grozny +3, Tambov 0, Krylia Sovetov Samara –3)

Source: Russian Premier Liga, Soccerway
Rules for classification: 1) Points; 2) Head-to-head points; 3) Head-to-head matches won; 4) Head-to-head goal difference; 5) Head-to-head goals scored; 6) Matches won; 7) Goal difference; 8) Goals scored; 9) Play-off.

=== Russian Cup ===
25 September 2019 Round of 32	Chernomorets Novorossiysk	0 – 2	Ural Yekaterinburg	Novorossiysk
21:00 YEKT (UTC+5)	Dzhamalutdinov (yellow card) 55'; Chabanov (yellow card) 89'	Report	Pogrebnyak 52', 90+2' (yellow card) 59'; Fidler (yellow card) 90'	Stadium: Central Stadium; Attendance: 6,000; Referee: Artyom Lyubimov

30 October 2019 Round of 16	Ural Yekaterinburg	2 – 2 (a.e.t.) (5 – 4 p)	Arsenal Tula	Yekaterinburg
19:00 YEKT (UTC+5)	Dimitrov 24'; El Kabir (yellow card) 30' (goal) 37' (pen.); Pogrebnyak (yellow card) 38'; Boumal (red card) 53'; Kulakov (yellow card) 120'	Report	Kostadinov 14'; Tkachyov 34'; Khagush (yellow card) 37'; Lomovitsky (yellow card) 65'; Bauer (yellow card) 97'; Lesovoy (yellow card) 109'	Stadium: Central Stadium; Attendance: 6,814; Referee: Anatoliy Zhabchenko
	Penalties
	Kulakov (penalty scored); Nasyrov (penalty missed); Augustyniak (penalty scored); Merkulov (penalty scored); Bavin (penalty scored); Haroyan (penalty scored)		(penalty scored) Bauer; (penalty scored) Álvarez; (penalty scored) Čaušić; (penalty missed) Tkachyov; (penalty scored) Lesovoy; (penalty missed) Kangwa

24 June 2020 Quarterfinal	Shinnik Yaroslavl	0 – 2	Ural Yekaterinburg	Yaroslavl
19:00 YEKT (UTC+5)	Oleynikov (yellow card) 37' (yellow-red card) 77'; Nizamutdinov (yellow card) 39'	Report	Bavin 16' (yellow card) 35'; Augustyniak 80'	Stadium: Shinnik Stadium; Attendance: 0 Referee: Igor Panin
Note: Match originally scheduled for 4 March 2020, but postponed due to the pitch at the Shinnik Stadium in Yaroslavl being unplayable. Match then rescheduled for 18 March 2020, but postponed on 17 March due to the COVID-19 pandemic.

19 July 2020 Semifinal	Ural Yekaterinburg	1 – 3	Khimki	Yekaterinburg
15:00 YEKT (UTC+5)	Kalinin (yellow card) 10'; Yemelyanov (yellow card) 56'; Panyukov 73'	Report	Gapon 11'; Troshechkin 36'; Polyarus 37'; Dyadyun (yellow card) 60'; Tikhiy (yellow card) 66'; Koryan (yellow card) 75'; Martusevich (yellow card) 80'; Danilkin (yellow card) 86'	Stadium: Central Stadium; Referee: Sergey Lapochkin

== Squad statistics ==
As of match played 19 July 2020

=== Appearances and goals ===
No.	Pos	Nat	Player	Total		Premier League		Russian Cup	
No.	Pos	Nat	Player	Apps	Goals	Apps	Goals	Apps	Goals
3	DF	(Armenia) ARM	Varazdat Haroyan	20	1	17+1	1	2	0
4	DF	(Russia) RUS	Artyom Mamin	1	0	1	0	0	0
5	DF	(Poland) POL	Maciej Wilusz	9	0	8	0	1	0
6	MF	(Poland) POL	Rafał Augustyniak	32	2	24+5	1	3	1
8	MF	(Russia) RUS	Roman Yemelyanov	16	0	14	0	2	0
10	MF	(Romania) ROU	Eric Bicfalvi	27	8	24+2	8	1	0
11	MF	(Russia) RUS	Dmitry Yefremov	10	0	2+6	0	0+2	0
13	MF	(Cameroon) CMR	Petrus Boumal	17	0	14+2	0	1	0
14	MF	(Russia) RUS	Yuri Bavin	24	4	8+13	3	2+1	1
15	DF	(Ukraine) UKR	Denys Kulakov	31	0	28	0	3	0
17	MF	(Bulgaria) BUL	Nikolay Dimitrov	19	2	15+3	1	1	1
18	MF	(Poland) POL	Michał Kucharczyk	19	0	11+5	0	2+1	0
19	DF	(Belarus) BLR	Dzyanis Palyakow	19	0	15+2	0	2	0
20	FW	(Russia) RUS	Andrei Panyukov	27	5	15+9	4	2+1	1
21	DF	(Russia) RUS	Islamzhan Nasyrov	9	0	1+6	0	1+1	0
27	DF	(Russia) RUS	Mikhail Merkulov	20	0	18	0	2	0
31	GK	(Russia) RUS	Yaroslav Hodzyur	28	0	25	0	3	0
35	DF	(Belarus) BLR	Nikolay Zolotov	8	0	4+3	0	1	0
44	MF	(Russia) RUS	Andrei Yegorychev	29	0	17+9	0	3	0
57	MF	(Russia) RUS	Artyom Fidler	9	0	6+1	0	1+1	0
58	MF	(Netherlands) NED	Othman El Kabir	24	7	20+2	6	2	1
60	GK	(Russia) RUS	Vladislav Poletayev	1	0	1	0	0	0
69	MF	(Russia) RUS	Artyom Shabolin	2	0	0+1	0	1	0
77	GK	(Russia) RUS	Oleg Baklov	4	0	3	0	1	0
78	MF	(Russia) RUS	Artyom Mamin	1	0	0	0	1	0
79	FW	(Russia) RUS	Artyom Yusupov	5	0	0+3	0	0+2	0
80	MF	(Russia) RUS	Chingiz Magomadov	3	0	1	0	0+2	0
88	FW	(Russia) RUS	Pavel Pogrebnyak	19	5	6+10	3	3	2
93	DF	(Russia) RUS	Aleksei Gerasimov	5	0	4	0	1	0
95	DF	(Russia) RUS	Ihor Kalinin	8	0	6	0	1+1	0
Players away from the club on loan:
Players who appeared for Ural Yekaterinburg but left during the season:
11	FW	(Russia) RUS	Vladimir Ilyin	20	4	11+7	4	1+1	0

=== Goal scorers ===
Place	Position	Nation	Number	Name	Premier League	Russian Cup	Total
1	MF	(Romania)	10	Eric Bicfalvi	8	0	8
2	MF	(Netherlands)	58	Othman El Kabir	6	1	7
3	FW	(Russia)	88	Pavel Pogrebnyak	3	2	5
3	FW	(Russia)	20	Andrei Panyukov	4	1	5
5	FW	(Russia)	11	Vladimir Ilyin	4	0	4
5	MF	(Russia)	14	Yuri Bavin	3	1	4
7	MF	(Bulgaria)	17	Nikolay Dimitrov	1	1	2
7	MF	(Poland)	6	Rafał Augustyniak	1	1	2
7				Own goal	2	0	2
10	DF	(Armenia)	3	Varazdat Haroyan	1	0	1
Total					33	7	40

=== Clean sheets ===
Place	Position	Nation	Number	Name	Premier League	Russian Cup	Total
1	GK	(Russia)	31	Yaroslav Hodzyur	5	1	6
2	GK	(Russia)	77	Oleg Baklov	0	1	1
Total					5	2	7

=== Disciplinary record ===
Number	Nation	Position	Name	Premier League		Russian Cup		Total	
Number	Nation	Position	Name	Yellow card	Red card	Yellow card	Red card	Yellow card	Red card
3	(Armenia)	DF	Varazdat Haroyan	7	0	0	0	7	0
6	(Poland)	MF	Rafał Augustyniak	3	0	0	0	3	0
8	(Russia)	MF	Roman Yemelyanov	7	1	1	0	8	1
10	(Romania)	MF	Eric Bicfalvi	5	1	0	0	5	1
13	(Cameroon)	MF	Petrus Boumal	8	0	0	1	8	1
14	(Russia)	MF	Yuri Bavin	3	0	1	0	4	0
15	(Ukraine)	DF	Denys Kulakov	4	0	1	0	5	0
17	(Bulgaria)	MF	Nikolay Dimitrov	1	0	0	0	1	0
19	(Belarus)	DF	Dzyanis Palyakow	4	0	0	0	4	0
20	(Russia)	FW	Andrei Panyukov	1	0	0	0	1	0
27	(Russia)	DF	Mikhail Merkulov	1	0	0	0	1	0
35	(Belarus)	DF	Nikolay Zolotov	3	0	0	0	3	0
44	(Russia)	MF	Andrei Yegorychev	2	0	0	0	2	0
57	(Russia)	MF	Artyom Fidler	4	0	0	0	4	0
58	(Netherlands)	MF	Othman El Kabir	4	0	1	0	5	0
80	(Russia)	MF	Chingiz Magomadov	1	0	0	0	1	0
88	(Russia)	FW	Pavel Pogrebnyak	2	0	1	0	3	0
95	(Russia)	DF	Ihor Kalinin	3	0	1	0	4	0
Players away on loan:
Players who left Ural Yekaterinburg during the season:
11	(Russia)	FW	Vladimir Ilyin	4	0	0	0	4	0
Total				67	2	6	1	73	3
