= 2012–13 FC Volyn Lutsk season =

Volyn Lutsk
2012-13 season
- Chairman: (Ukraine) Vasyl Stolyar
- Manager: (Ukraine) Anatoliy Demyanenko
- Stadium: "Avanhard" Stadium
- Premier League: 9th
- Ukrainian Cup: Round of 16
- Top goalscorer: League: Ramon Lopes (3); All: Ramon Lopes (3)
- Highest home attendance: 10,000 vs Shakhtar; 6 August 2012
- Lowest home attendance: 4,150 vs Vorskla; 22 July 2012
- Average home league attendance: 6,030; 14 September 2012

The Volyn 2012–13 season was Volyn's 12th Ukrainian Premier League season, and their first season under manager Anatoliy Demyanenko. During the season Volyn Lutsk competed in the Ukrainian Premier League and Ukrainian Cup.

== Squad ==
The squad is given according to the club's official website, updated as of 9 August 2012.

Note: Flags indicate national team as defined under FIFA eligibility rules; some limited exceptions apply. Players may hold more than one non-FIFA nationality.

No.	Pos.	Nation	Player
1	GK	UKR	Maksym Startsev
2	FW	NGR	Abayomi Owonikoko
3	DF	UKR	Serhiy Siminin (captain)
4	DF	BUL	Valentin Iliev
5	DF	BUL	Petar Zanev
6	DF	MKD	Vanče Šikov
8	MF	UKR	Ihor Skoba
9	MF	UKR	Oleh Herasymyuk
10	MF	ROU	Eric Bicfalvi
11	FW	MKD	Dušan Savić
13	MF	UKR	Vadym Panas
14	DF	SVK	Ján Maslo
15	DF	UKR	Oleh Shandruk

No.	Pos.	Nation	Player
17	FW	UKR	Yevhen Pavlov
18	MF	UKR	Vitaliy Pryndeta
19	FW	UKR	Oleksiy Babyr
21	MF	UKR	Volodymyr Arzhanov (on loan from Arsenal Kyiv)
24	DF	ROU	Silviu Izvoranu
31	FW	SUI	Danijel Subotić
35	MF	SRB	Saša Stević
36	DF	UKR	Roman Hodovanyi
38	DF	UKR	Oleksandr Nasonov
42	GK	UKR	Vitaliy Nedilko
78	GK	UKR	Serhiy Litovchenko
89	MF	BRA	Ramon Lopes
90	MF	UKR	Serhiy Pylypchuk

=== Out on loan ===
Note: Flags indicate national team as defined under FIFA eligibility rules; some limited exceptions apply. Players may hold more than one non-FIFA nationality.

No.	Pos.	Nation	Player
—	FW	UKR	Oleksandr Pyschur (on loan to Obolon Kyiv)

== Competitions ==
=== 2012-13 Ukrainian Premier League ===
==== Results summary ====
Overall								Home						Away					
Pld	W	D	L	GF	GA	GD	Pts	W	D	L	GF	GA	GD	W	D	L	GF	GA	GD
30	7	8	15	26	45	−19	29	4	5	6	14	21	−7	3	3	9	12	24	−12

Last updated: 26 May 2013.
Source: Soccerway

==== Results by round ====
Round	1	2	3	4	5	6	7	8	9	10	11	12	13	14	15	16	17	18	19	20	21	22	23	24	25	26	27	28	29	30
Ground	H	H	A	H	A	H	A	H	A	H	A	H	A	H	A	A	A	H	A	H	A	H	A	H	A	H	A	H	A	H
Result	D	W	W	L	L	D	L	W	D	L	W	D	D	W	L	L	W	L	L	L	L	D	L	L	L	D	L	L	D	W
Position	8	7	5	6	9	9	11	9	8	10	9	9	9	9	13	13	13	13	13	13	13	13	13	13	13	13	13	13	13	13

Source: Soccerway
A = Away; H = Home; W = Win; D = Draw; L = Loss

==== Results ====
13 July 2012 Match 1	Volyn	1 – 1	Karpaty	Lutsk
19:00	Ramon 69'	Summary	Lucas 63'	Stadium: Avanhard Stadium; Attendance: 7,600; Referee: Dmytro Kutakov

22 July 2012 Match 2	Volyn	1 – 0	Vorskla	Lutsk
18:42	Subotić 34'	Summary		Stadium: Avanhard Stadium; Attendance: 4,150; Referee: Dmytro Zhukov

28 July 2012 Match 3	Chornomorets	0 – 2	Volyn	Odesa
21:00		Summary	Izvoranu 15'; Bicfalvi 76'	Stadium: Chornomorets Stadium; Attendance: 19,255; Referee: Oleksandr Ivanov

6 August 2012 Match 4	Volyn	0 – 4	Shakhtar	Lutsk
19:00		Summary	Dević 4'; Mkhitaryan 32', 51'; Teixeira 42'	Stadium: Avanhard Stadium; Attendance: 10,000; Referee: Yevhen Aranovskiy

12 August 2012 Match 5	Dynamo	4 – 1	Volyn	Kyiv
19:00	Kranjčar 22', 49'; Ideye Brown 29', 90+1'	Summary	Ramon 34'	Stadium: NSC Olimpiyskiy; Attendance: 23,122; Referee: Yuri Mozharovskyi

19 August 2012 Match 6	Volyn	2 – 2	Zorya	Lutsk
19:30	Pylypchuk 32'; Ramon 55'; Šikov (yellow card) 12' (yellow-red card) 82'	Summary	Ignjatijević (yellow card) 45+2' (yellow-red card) 75'; Idahor 82'; Hrytsay 90'	Stadium: Avanhard Stadium; Attendance: 4,200; Referee: Anatoliy Zhabchenko

26 August 2012 Match 7	Dnipro	2 – 1	Volyn	Dnipropetrovsk
17:30	Kalinić 23'; Aliyev 47'	Summary	Subotić 20'	Stadium: Dnipro Arena; Attendance: 14,436; Referee: Serhiy Dankovskyi

2 September 2012 Match 8	Volyn	2 – 1	Metalist	Lutsk
17:30	Bicfalvi 20'; Subotić 37'	Summary	Willian 18'	Stadium: Avanhard Stadium; Attendance: 4,200; Referee: Yaroslav Kozyk

15 September 2012 Match 9	Illichivets	0 – 0	Volyn	Mariupol
17:00		Summary		Stadium: Illichivets Stadium; Attendance: 9,500; Referee: Oleksandr Derdo

29 September 2012 Match 10	Volyn	0 – 1	Tavriya	Lutsk
17:30		Summary	Nazarenko 5'	Stadium: Avanhard Stadium; Attendance: 4,600; Referee: Serhiy Lysenchuk

6 October 2012 Match 11	Metalurh Zaporizhya	0 – 3	Volyn	Zaporizhya
18:30		Summary	Pylypchuk 34'; Bicfalvi 35'; Arzhanov 50'	Stadium: Slavutych-Arena; Attendance: 3,000; Referee: Yevhen Aranovskiy

20 October 2012 Match 12	Volyn	1 - 1	Metalurh Donetsk	Lutsk
17:30	Shandruk (yellow card) 3'; Siminin (yellow card) 51'; Savić 90+2' (yellow card) 90+3'	Summary	Morozyuk (yellow card) 53'; Mkrtchyan (yellow card) 68'; Júnior Moraes 80' (pen.)	Stadium: Avanhard Stadium; Attendance: 4,200; Referee: (Ukraine) Yury Vaks

26 October 2012 Match 13	Arsenal Kyiv	1 - 1	Volyn Lutsk	Valeriy Lobanovskyi Dynamo Stadium
19:00	Adiyiah 81'	Summary	Seun 86'	Attendance: 1,150; Referee: (Ukraine) Yury Grisjo

==== League table ====
Pos	Team	Pld	W	D	L	GF	GA	GD	Pts
11	Tavriya Simferopol	30	10	5	15	27	46	−19	32 (Note: Tavria Simferopol were deducted 3 points for non compliance with contractual agreements with player agents (regarding Makhach Gadzhiyev).)
12	Vorskla Poltava	30	8	7	15	31	36	−5	31
13	Volyn Lutsk	30	7	8	15	26	45	−19	29
14	Karpaty Lviv	30	7	6	17	37	52	−15	27
15	Hoverla Uzhhorod	30	5	7	18	29	57	−28	22

Source: uafootball.net.ua
Rules for classification: 1st points; 2nd goal difference; 3rd goals scored; 4th head-to-head points; 5th head-to-head goal difference; 6th head-to-head goals scored; 7th fair play; 8th draw (Regulation, p.52-53).

=== 2012-13 Ukrainian Cup results ===
23 September 2012 Round of 32	Slavutych Cherkasy	1 – 3 aet	Volyn	Cherkasy
17:15	Hud 87'	Summary	Owonikoko 90+4'; Nasonov 95'; Pavlov 97'	Stadium: Tsentralnyi Stadion; Attendance: 9,500; Referee: Dmytro Zhukov (Donetsk)

31 October 2012 Round of 16	Shakhtar Sverdlovsk	0 – 2	Volyn	Sverdlovsk
11:00		Summary	Subotić 4' (pen.); Stević 62'	Stadium: N.I. Horiushkin Memorial Stadium; Attendance: 3,100; Referee: yurii foschii

== Squad statistics ==
=== Goal scorers ===
As of 7 October 2012

Place	Position	Nation	Number	Name	Premier League	Ukrainian Cup	Total
1	MF	(Brazil)	89	Ramon Lopes	3	0	3
1	FW	(Switzerland)	31	Danijel Subotić	3	0	3
1	MF	(Romania)	10	Eric Bicfalvi	3	0	3
4	MF	(Ukraine)	90	Serhiy Pylypchuk	2	0	2
5	MF	(Ukraine)	21	Volodymyr Arzhanov	1	0	1
5	DF	(Romania)	24	Silviu Izvoranu	1	0	1
5	DF	(Ukraine)	38	Oleksandr Nasonov	0	1	1
5	FW	(Nigeria)	2	Abayomi Owonikoko Seun	0	1	1
5	FW	(Ukraine)	17	Yevhen Pavlov	0	1	1
				TOTALS	13	3	16

=== Appearances and goals ===
As of 7 October 2012

No.	Pos	Nat	Player	Total		Premier League		Ukrainian Cup	
No.	Pos	Nat	Player	Apps	Goals	Apps	Goals	Apps	Goals
1	GK	(Ukraine) UKR	Maksym Startsev	4	0	4	0	0	0
2	FW	(Nigeria) NGR	Abayomi Owonikoko Seun	3	1	0+2	0	0+1	1
3	DF	(Ukraine) UKR	Serhiy Siminin	10	0	10	0	0	0
4	DF	(Bulgaria) BUL	Valentin Iliev	9	0	9	0	0	0
5	DF	(Bulgaria) BUL	Petar Zanev	10	0	9	0	1	0
6	DF	(North Macedonia) MKD	Vanče Šikov	9	0	9	0	0	0
8	MF	(Ukraine) UKR	Ihor Skoba	6	0	4+1	0	1	0
9	MF	(Ukraine) UKR	Oleh Herasymyuk	5	0	1+3	0	1	0
10	MF	(Romania) ROU	Eric Bicfalvi	10	3	10	3	0	0
11	FW	(North Macedonia) MKD	Dušan Savić	2	0	0+1	0	1	0
14	DF	(Slovakia) SVK	Ján Maslo	1	0	1	0	0	0
15	DF	(Ukraine) UKR	Oleh Shandruk	5	0	3+1	0	1	0
17	FW	(Ukraine) UKR	Yevhen Pavlov	4	1	0+3	0	0+1	1
19	FW	(Ukraine) UKR	Oleksiy Babyr	5	0	1+3	0	1	0
21	MF	(Ukraine) UKR	Volodymyr Arzhanov	6	1	5	1	1	0
24	DF	(Romania) ROU	Silviu Izvoranu	10	1	8+1	1	1	0
31	FW	(Switzerland) SUI	Danijel Subotić	9	3	9	3	0	0
35	MF	(Serbia) SRB	Saša Stević	5	0	2+3	0	0	0
36	DF	(Ukraine) UKR	Roman Hodovanyi	1	0	0	0	0+1	0
38	DF	(Ukraine) UKR	Oleksandr Nasonov	7	1	4+2	0	1	1
78	GK	(Ukraine) UKR	Serhiy Litovchenko	8	0	6+1	0	1	0
89	MF	(Brazil) BRA	Ramon Lopes	7	3	7	3	0	0
90	MF	(Ukraine) UKR	Serhiy Pylypchuk	10	2	7+2	2	1	0
Players who appeared for Volyn who left the club during the season:
7	FW	(Brazil) BRA	Schumacher	5	0	2+3	0	0	0

=== Disciplinary record ===
Number	Nation	Position	Name	Premier League		Ukrainian Cup		Total	
Number	Nation	Position	Name	Yellow card	Red card	Yellow card	Red card	Yellow card	Red card
3	(Ukraine)	DF	Serhiy Siminin	2	0	0	0	2	0
4	(Bulgaria)	DF	Valentin Iliev	3	0	0	0	3	0
5	(Bulgaria)	DF	Petar Zanev	4	0	0	0	4	0
6	(North Macedonia)	DF	Vanče Šikov	0	1	0	0	0	1
8	(Ukraine)	MF	Ihor Skoba	2	0	0	0	2	0
10	(Romania)	MF	Eric Bicfalvi	1	0	0	0	1	0
11	(North Macedonia)	FW	Dušan Savić	0	0	1	0	1	0
15	(Ukraine)	DF	Oleh Shandruk	1	0	0	0	1	0
21	(Ukraine)	MF	Volodymyr Arzhanov	3	0	1	0	4	0
24	(Romania)	DF	Silviu Izvoranu	3	0	0	0	3	0
31	(Switzerland)	FW	Danijel Subotić	3	0	0	0	3	0
35	(Serbia)	MF	Saša Stević	1	0	0	0	1	0
38	(Ukraine)	DF	Oleksandr Nasonov	0	0	1	0	1	0
89	(Brazil)	MF	Ramon Lopes	2	0	0	0	2	0
90	(Ukraine)	MF	Serhiy Pylypchuk	1	0	1	0	2	0
			TOTALS	26	1	4	0	30	1
