= Skoba =

Skoba may refer to:

- Skoba Island in the Wilhelm Archipelago of the Antarctic Peninsula
- Ihor Skoba (born 1982), Ukrainian footballer
