= Aleksey Yevseyev =

Russian footballer (born 1994)

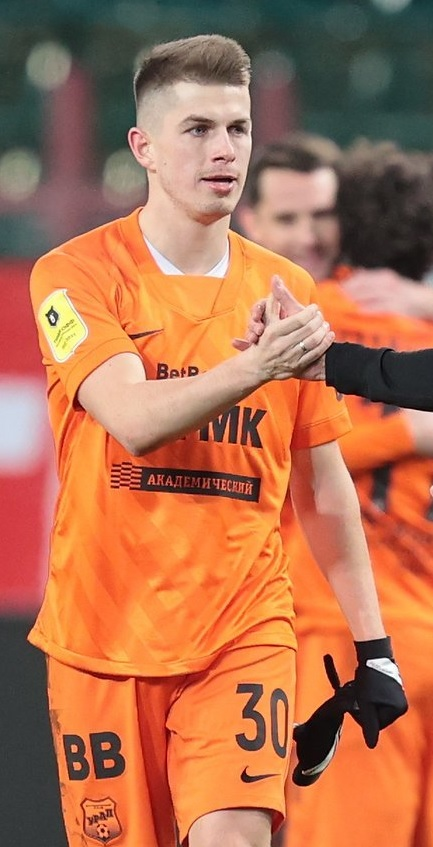
- Yevseyev with Ural Yekaterinburg in 2021

Personal information
- Full name: Aleksey Vitalyevich Yevseyev
- Date of birth: 30 March 1994 (age 32)
- Place of birth: Saint Petersburg, Russia
- Height: 1.84 m (6 ft 0 in)
- Position: Midfielder

Team information
- Current team: FC Murom
- Number: 94

Youth career
- –2007: DFK Zenit-84 Saint Petersburg
- 2007–2015: FC Zenit Saint Petersburg

Senior career*
Years	Team	Apps	(Gls)
2012–2017	FC Zenit Saint Petersburg	7	(0)
2013–2017	→ FC Zenit-2 Saint Petersburg	87	(37)
2017–2018	FC Ural Yekaterinburg	25	(4)
2019	FC Khimki	5	(0)
2019–2020	FC Rotor Volgograd	16	(1)
2020	→ FC Fakel Voronezh (loan)	2	(0)
2020–2023	FC Ural Yekaterinburg	29	(1)
2020–2022	FC Ural-2 Yekaterinburg	5	(0)
2022–2023	→ FC Ufa (loan)	21	(5)
2023–2024	FC Tekstilshchik Ivanovo	44	(11)
2025–2026	FC Dynamo Saint Petersburg	15	(3)
2026–	FC Murom	9	(2)

International career
2012–2013	Russia U-19	11	(3)
2015–2016	Russia U-21	17	(7)
- * Club domestic league appearances and goals as of 1 November 2026

Aleksey Vitalyevich Yevseyev (Russian: Алексей Витальевич Евсеев; born 30 March 1994) is a Russian footballer who plays as an attacking midfielder or central midfielder for FC Murom.

== Club career ==
He made his debut in the Russian Premier League on 22 July 2012 for FC Zenit Saint Petersburg in a game against FC Amkar Perm.

On 25 December 2018, he left FC Ural Yekaterinburg by mutual consent. On 22 February 2019, he signed with FC Khimki.

On 25 August 2020, he returned to Ural. On 14 February 2022, Yevseyev extended his contract with Ural until the end of the 2022–23 season. On 8 September 2022, Yevseyev was loaned to FC Ufa. Yevseyev left Ural in June 2023.

== Career statistics ==
=== Club ===
As of 27 November 2022

Club	Season	League			Cup		Continental		Other		Total	
Club	Season	Division	Apps	Goals	Apps	Goals	Apps	Goals	Apps	Goals	Apps	Goals
Zenit St. Petersburg	2012–13	Premier League	1	0	1	0	0	0	–		2	0
Zenit St. Petersburg	2014–15	Premier League	1	0	0	0	0	0	–		1	0
Zenit St. Petersburg	2015–16	Premier League	5	0	1	0	1 (Note: Appearance in the UEFA Champions League)	0	–		7	0
Zenit St. Petersburg	2016–17	Premier League	0	0	0	0	0	0	–		0	0
Zenit St. Petersburg	Total		7	0	2	0	1	0	0	0	10	0
Zenit-2 St. Petersburg	2013–14	Second League	21	9	–		–		–		21	9
Zenit-2 St. Petersburg	2014–15	Second League	24	17	–		–		–		24	17
Zenit-2 St. Petersburg	2015–16	First League	14	3	–		–		–		14	3
Zenit-2 St. Petersburg	2016–17	First League	28	8	–		–		4 (Note: Appearances in the FNL Cup)	0	32	8
Zenit-2 St. Petersburg	Total		87	37	0	0	0	0	4	0	91	37
Ural Yekaterinburg	2017–18	Premier League	20	4	1	0	–		3	3	24	7
Ural Yekaterinburg	2018–19	Premier League	5	0	1	1	–		–		6	1
Khimki	2018–19	First League	5	0	–		–		–		5	0
Rotor Volgograd	2019–20	First League	16	1	1	0	–		–		17	1
Fakel Voronezh	2019–20	First League	2	0	–		–		2	2	4	2
Ural Yekaterinburg	2020–21	Premier League	18	1	2	0	–		–		20	1
Ural Yekaterinburg	2021–22	Premier League	10	0	0	0	–		–		10	0
Ural Yekaterinburg	2022–23	Premier League	1	0	0	0	–		–		1	0
Ural Yekaterinburg	Total		54	5	4	1	0	0	3	3	61	9
Ural-2 Yekaterinburg	2020–21	Second League	2	0	–		–		–		2	0
Ural-2 Yekaterinburg	2021–22	Second League	2	0	–		–		–		2	0
Ural-2 Yekaterinburg	2022–23	Second League	1	0	–		–		–		1	0
Ural-2 Yekaterinburg	Total		5	0	0	0	0	0	0	0	5	0
Ufa (loan)	2022–23	First League	9	2	2	0	–		–		11	2
Career total			185	45	9	1	1	0	9	5	204	51

== Honours ==
=== Individual ===
- CIS Cup top goalscorer: 2015
