= Yevgeni Tatarinov =

Russian footballer (born 1999)

Personal information
- Full name: Yevgeni Vladimirovich Tatarinov
- Date of birth: 6 February 1999 (age 27)
- Place of birth: Verkhnyaya Salda, Russia
- Height: 1.80 m (5 ft 11 in)
- Position: Forward

Team information
- Current team: Tyumen
- Number: 10

Youth career
- 2017–2020: Ural Yekaterinburg

Senior career*
Years	Team	Apps	(Gls)
2017–2024	Ural Yekaterinburg	13	(0)
2019–2024	Ural-2 Yekaterinburg	54	(21)
2019	→ Torpedo Moscow (loan)	12	(0)
2023–2024	→ Tyumen (loan)	30	(3)
2024	Volgar Astrakhan	14	(1)
2025	Sibir Novosibirsk	17	(5)
2025–2026	Tekstilshchik Ivanovo	29	(1)
2026–	Tyumen	8	(7)
- * Club domestic league appearances and goals as of 17 October 2026

Yevgeni Vladimirovich Tatarinov (Russian: Евгений Владимирович Татаринов; born 6 February 1999) is a Russian football player who plays as a forward for Tyumen.

== Club career ==
He debuted for the main squad of Ural Yekaterinburg on 20 September 2017 in a Russian Cup game against Luch-Energiya Vladivostok.

He made his debut in the Russian Professional Football League for Ural-2 Yekaterinburg on 4 April 2019 in a game against Zenit-Izhevsk.

On 11 July 2019 he joined Torpedo Moscow on loan for the 2019–20 season. He made his Russian Football National League debut for Torpedo on 13 July 2019 in a game against Baltika Kaliningrad. His loan was terminated early on 11 January 2020.

He made his Russian Premier League debut for Ural on 5 December 2020 in a game against Zenit St. Petersburg, he substituted Pavel Pogrebnyak in the 76th minute.

He scored five goals in nine appearances as a centre forward for Ural 2 in the third tier of Russian football during the 2020–21 season.

On 15 June 2023, Tatarinov joined Tyumen on loan for the 2023–24 season.

== Career statistics ==
As of 27 November 2022

Club	Season	League			Cup		Continental		Other		Total	
Club	Season	Division	Apps	Goals	Apps	Goals	Apps	Goals	Apps	Goals	Apps	Goals
Ural Yekaterinburg	2017–18	Premier League	0	0	1	0	–		–		1	0
Ural Yekaterinburg	2019–20	Premier League	0	0	0	0	–		4 (Note: Appearances in the FNL Cup)	0	4	0
Ural Yekaterinburg	2020–21	Premier League	3	0	0	0	–		–		3	0
Ural Yekaterinburg	2022–23	Premier League	4	0	1	0	–		–		5	0
Ural Yekaterinburg	Total		7	0	2	0	0	0	4	0	13	0
Ural-2 Yekaterinburg	2018–19	Second League	9	3	–		–		–		9	3
Ural-2 Yekaterinburg	2020–21	Second League	9	5	–		–		–		9	5
Ural-2 Yekaterinburg	2021–22	Second League	22	7	–		–		–		22	7
Ural-2 Yekaterinburg	2022–23	Second League	12	5	–		–		–		12	5
Ural-2 Yekaterinburg	Total		52	20	0	0	0	0	0	0	52	20
Torpedo Moscow (loan)	2019–20	First League	12	0	1	0	–		–		13	0
Career total			71	20	3	0	0	0	4	0	78	20
