= Eric Bicfalvi =

Romanian footballer (born 1988)

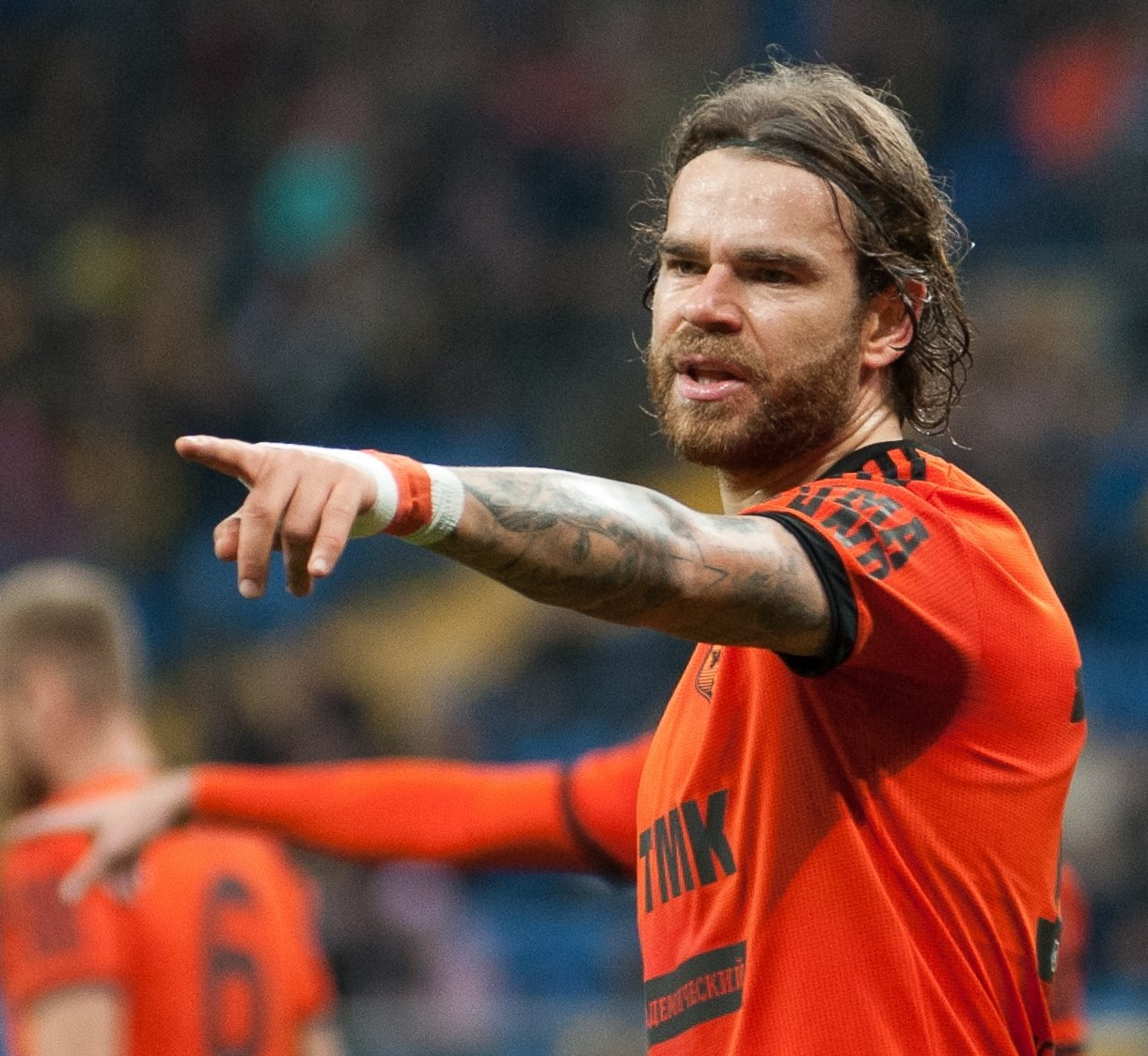
- Bicfalvi with Ural Yekaterinburg in 2019

Personal information
- Full name: Eric Cosmin Bicfalvi
- Date of birth: 5 February 1988 (age 38)
- Place of birth: Carei, Romania
- Height: 1.87 m (6 ft 2 in)
- Positions: Attacking midfielder; forward

Youth career
- Școala Sportivă Carei
- –2005: Kaizer Carei

Senior career*
Years	Team	Apps	(Gls)
2005–2006	Fink Fenster Petrești	23	(9)
2006–2007	Jiul Petroșani	16	(0)
2007–2012	Steaua București	63	(3)
2008	→ Gloria Buzău (loan)	25	(1)
2012–2015	Volyn Lutsk	73	(26)
2015–2016	Liaoning Whowin	12	(0)
2016	Dinamo București	7	(1)
2016	Tom Tomsk	15	(3)
2017–2025	Ural Yekaterinburg	196	(49)
2025	Oțelul Galați	13	(0)
Total		447	(92)

International career
2006–2007	Romania U19	3	(1)
2007–2010	Romania U21	23	(3)
2014–2021	Romania	9	(1)
- * Club domestic league appearances and goals as of 5 August 2025

Eric Cosmin Bicfalvi (Romanian pronunciation: ['erik kosˈmin ˈbikfalvi]; born 5 February 1988) is a Romanian former professional footballer who played as an attacking midfielder or a forward.

Bicfalvi began his senior career with Fink Fenster Petrești in the Romanian third tier, and went on to amass over 100 appearances in the Liga I for Jiul Petroșani, FC Steaua București and Gloria Buzău combined. He moved abroad for the first time by joining Ukrainian team Volyn Lutsk in 2012, where he was top scorer of the national league in the 2014–15 season. After brief spells in China and back to Romania, Bicfalvi has played in Russia since 2016.

Bicfalvi has been a full Romania international since November 2014, making his debut in a 2–0 friendly win over Denmark. He previously represented the nation at under-19 and under-21 levels.

== Club career ==
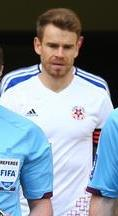
Bicfalvi with Volyn Lutsk in 2015

In 2005, Bicfalvi began his senior career in the Romanian third division with Fink Fenster Petrești, where he spent one year. During this period, he made 23 appearances and scored nine goals for the club. The following season he moved to Liga I side Jiul Petroșani. After the team was relegated, he was signed by FC Steaua București on a five-year deal.

In 2012, as his contract expired he subsequently joined Ukrainian club Volyn Lutsk. Bicfalvi ended the 2014–15 Ukrainian Premier League season as joint-top scorer with 17 goals, which earned him a transfer to Liaoning Whowin in the Chinese Super League on 7 July 2015.

He did not adapt to life in China and after a brief spell with Dinamo București, the cross-town rival of his former club Steaua, he put pen on a contract with Tom Tomsk, newly promoted to the Russian Premier League.

On 23 January 2017, he signed a two-and-a-half-year contract with another Russian first division side, Ural Yekaterinburg. Bicfalvi was chosen as Russian Premier League player of the month for May 2022 after scoring 4 goals in 4 games during the month.

Bicfalvi left Ural Yekaterinburg after eight years at the club on 15 January 2025.

After nine years in Russia, Bicfalvi returned in Liga I signing a contract with Oțelul Galați until June 2026.

== International career ==
Bicfalvi is a former Romania youth international, representing the nation at under-19 and under-21 levels.

In August 2013, after not being called up by the Romania senior team on any occasion, his agent announced that Bicfalvi would like to play for Hungary in the near future.

However, Romania senior manager Anghel Iordănescu named him as a possible call-up for the next UEFA Euro 2016 qualifier against Northern Ireland in November 2014. On 18 November that year, Bicfalvi made his full debut in a friendly with Denmark.

== Personal life ==
Bicfalvi's paternal grandfather, Alexander Bicfalvi/Sándor Bikfalvi was also a footballer and played for Victoria Carei. He was ethnic Swedish according to Gazeta Sporturilor and Hungarian according to Nemzeti Sport, while Eric's mother, Elisabeta/Erzsébet, is of Hungarian heritage.

== Career statistics ==
=== Club ===
As of match played 4 August 2025

Appearances and goals by club, season and competition
Club	Season	League			National cup (Note: Includes Cupa României, Ukrainian Cup, Russian Cup)		Continental		Other		Total	
Club	Season	Division	Apps	Goals	Apps	Goals	Apps	Goals	Apps	Goals	Apps	Goals
Jiul Petroșani	2006–07	Liga I	16	0	0	0	—		—		16	0
Steaua București	2007–08	Liga I	9	1	2	0	4 (Note: Appearances in UEFA Champions League)	0	—		15	1
Steaua București	2008–09	Liga I	6	1	0	0	—		—		6	1
Steaua București	2009–10	Liga I	7	0	2	0	6 (Note: Appearances in UEFA Europa League)	0	—		15	0
Steaua București	2010–11	Liga I	20	0	3	0	6	0	—		29	0
Steaua București	2011–12	Liga I	21	1	1	0	6	0	1 (Note: Appearance in Supercupa României)	0	29	1
Steaua București	Total		63	3	8	0	22	0	1	0	94	3
Gloria Buzău (loan)	2007–08	Liga I	14	1	1	0	—		—		15	1
Gloria Buzău (loan)	2008–09	Liga I	11	0	0	0	—		—		11	0
Gloria Buzău (loan)	Total		25	1	1	0	0	0	0	0	26	1
Steaua II București	2009–10	Liga II	3	1	—		—		—		3	1
Volyn Lutsk	2012–13	Ukrainian Premier League	24	5	1	0	—		—		25	5
Volyn Lutsk	2013–14	Ukrainian Premier League	23	4	1	0	—		—		24	4
Volyn Lutsk	2014–15	Ukrainian Premier League	26	17	3	2	—		—		29	19
Volyn Lutsk	Total		73	26	5	2	0	0	0	0	78	28
Liaoning Whowin	2015	Chinese Super League	12	0	0	0	—		—		12	0
Dinamo București	2015–16	Liga I	7	1	2	1	—		1 (Note: Appearance in Cupa Ligii)	0	10	2
Tom Tomsk	2016–17	Russian Premier League	15	3	0	0	—		—		15	3
Ural Yekaterinburg	2016–17	Russian Premier League	9	2	3	2	—		—		12	4
Ural Yekaterinburg	2017–18	Russian Premier League	26	8	0	0	—		—		26	8
Ural Yekaterinburg	2018–19	Russian Premier League	26	6	5	2	—		1 (Note: Appearance in FNL Cup)	0	32	8
Ural Yekaterinburg	2019–20	Russian Premier League	26	8	1	0	—		1	0	28	8
Ural Yekaterinburg	2020–21	Russian Premier League	22	7	2	3	—		—		24	10
Ural Yekaterinburg	2021–22	Russian Premier League	28	10	1	0	—		—		29	10
Ural Yekaterinburg	2022–23	Russian Premier League	26	4	11	4	—		—		37	8
Ural Yekaterinburg	2023–24	Russian Premier League	22	3	4	1	—		1 (Note: Appearance in relegation play-offs)	0	27	4
Ural Yekaterinburg	2024–25	Russian First League	11	1	3	0	—		—		14	1
Ural Yekaterinburg	Total		196	49	30	12	0	0	3	0	229	61
Oțelul Galați	2025–25	Liga I	9	0	—		—		—		9	0
Oțelul Galați	2025–26	Liga I	4	0	—		—		—		4	0
Oțelul Galați	Total		13	0	—		—		—		13	0
Career total			423	84	46	15	22	0	5	0	496	99

=== International ===
As of match played 25 March 2021

Appearances and goals by national team and year
National team	Year	Apps	Goals
Romania
Romania	2014	1	0
Romania	2016	2	0
Romania	2017	3	0
Romania	2020	2	1
Romania	2021	1	0
Total		9	1

Scores and results list Romania's goal tally first, score column indicates score after each Bicfalvi goal.

List of international goals scored by Eric Bicfalvi
No.	Date	Venue	Cap	Opponent	Score	Result	Competition
1	18 November 2020	Windsor Park, Belfast, Northern Ireland	8	Northern Ireland	1–1	1–1	2020–21 UEFA Nations League B

== Honours ==
Steaua București

- Cupa României: 2010–11

Dinamo București

- Cupa României runner-up: 2015–16

Ural Yekaterinburg

- Russian Cup runner-up: 2016–17, 2018–19
- FNL Cup: 2018

Individual

- Ukrainian Premier League top scorer: 2014–15 (17 goals)
