= Nikita Chistyakov =

Russian football player

Personal information
- Full name: Nikita Andreyevich Chistyakov
- Date of birth: 8 August 2000 (age 26)
- Place of birth: Makhachkala, Russia
- Height: 1.81 m (5 ft 11 in)
- Position: Left-back

Team information
- Current team: FC Shinnik Yaroslavl
- Number: 23

Youth career
- FC Anzhi Makhachkala

Senior career*
Years	Team	Apps	(Gls)
2017–2019	FC Anzhi Makhachkala	3	(0)
2018	→ FC Anzhi-2 Makhachkala	3	(0)
2019–2023	FC Ural Yekaterinburg	0	(0)
2019	→ FC Ural-2 Yekaterinburg	10	(0)
2020	→ FC Chayka Peschanokopskoye (loan)	2	(0)
2020–2021	→ FC Ural-2 Yekaterinburg	23	(1)
2021–2022	→ FC Akron Tolyatti (loan)	22	(1)
2022–2023	→ FC Tyumen (loan)	11	(0)
2023	→ FC Novosibirsk (loan)	9	(0)
2023–2024	FC Forte Taganrog	28	(1)
2024–2026	FC Tekstilshchik Ivanovo	45	(3)
2026	FC Chernomorets Novorossiysk	13	(0)
2026–	FC Shinnik Yaroslavl	0	(0)

International career^{‡}
2018	Russia U-18	4	(0)
2018–2019	Russia U-19	4	(0)
2019	Russia U-20	4	(0)
- * Club domestic league appearances and goals as of 16 May 2026 ‡ National team caps and goals as of 8 August 2019

Nikita Andreyevich Chistyakov (Russian: Никита Андреевич Чистяков; born 8 August 2000) is a Russian football player who plays for FC Shinnik Yaroslavl.

== Club career ==
He made his debut in the Russian Professional Football League for FC Anzhi-2 Makhachkala on 11 May 2018 in a game against FC Krasnodar-2.

He made his Russian Premier League debut for FC Anzhi Makhachkala on 10 May 2019 in a game against FC Arsenal Tula, as a starter.

On 21 June 2019, he signed with FC Ural Yekaterinburg. On 4 February 2020, he was loaned to FC Chayka Peschanokopskoye.

On 19 June 2021, he joined FC Akron Tolyatti on loan for the 2021–22 season. For the 2022–23 season, Chistyakov moved on loan to FC Tyumen. On 25 January 2023, he moved on a new loan to FC Novosibirsk.

On 28 June 2023, Chistyakov moved to FC Forte Taganrog.
