= Serhiy Pylypchuk =

Ukrainian footballer

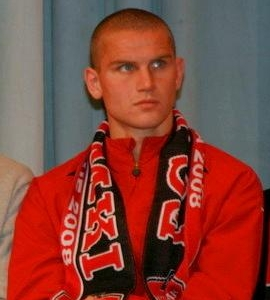
- Pylypchuk in 2008

Personal information
- Full name: Serhiy Valeriyovych Pylypchuk
- Date of birth: 26 November 1984 (age 41)
- Place of birth: Zmiiv, Kharkiv Oblast, Ukrainian SSR
- Height: 1.87 m (6 ft 1 1/2 in)
- Position: Midfielder

Youth career
- Metalist Kharkiv

Senior career*
| Years | Team | Apps | (Gls) |
| 2001–2004 | Metalist Kharkiv | 21 | (1) |
| 2001–2004 | → Metalist-2 Kharkiv | 42 | (7) |
| 2005–2007 | Spartak Nalchik | 77 | (11) |
| 2008–2010 | Khimki | 30 | (4) |
| 2009 | → Spartak Nalchik (loan) | 5 | (0) |
| 2010 | Volga Nizhny Novgorod | 4 | (0) |
| 2010 | → Shinnik Yaroslavl (loan) | 17 | (2) |
| 2011 | Spartak Nalchik | 22 | (0) |
| 2012–2013 | Volyn Lutsk | 29 | (3) |
| 2013–2017 | Korona Kielce | 95 | (8) |
| 2014–2017 | Korona Kielce II | 11 | (4) |
| 2017–2018 | Wigry Suwałki | 24 | (3) |
| 2018 | Chojniczanka Chojnice | 9 | (0) |
| 2019 | Vovchansk (amateurs) | 7 | (2) |
| 2022–2025 | Piaskowianka Piaski | 41 | (12) |

International career
| 2004–2006 | Ukraine U21 | 5 | (0) |

Managerial career
- 2022–2024: Piaskowianka Piaski (player-manager)
Medal record
Men's football
Representing Ukraine
UEFA European Under-21 Championship
| Runner-up | 2006 Portugal |
- * Club domestic league appearances and goals

Serhiy Valeriyovych Pylypchuk (Ukrainian: Сергій Валерійович Пилипчук, Russian: Сергeй Валерьeвич Пилипчук; born 26 November 1984) is a Ukrainian football manager and former player. He was most recently the assistant coach of Polish side Korona Kielce II.

== Honours ==
Ukraine U21

- UEFA European Under-21 Championship runner-up: 2006
