= Roman Hodovanyi =

Ukrainian footballer (1990–2023)

Personal information
- Full name: Roman Petrovych Hodovanyi
- Date of birth: 4 October 1990
- Place of birth: Ternopil, Ukrainian SSR, USSR
- Date of death: 29 November 2023 (aged 33)
- Place of death: Ukraine
- Height: 1.87 m (6 ft 2 in)
- Position: Defender

Youth career
- 2003–2005: Youth Sports School Ternopil
- 2006: Nyva Kopychentsi
- 2007: Pedlitsey Ternopil
- 2007–2008: Ternopil

Senior career*
Years	Team	Apps	(Gls)
2009	Nyva Ternopil	20	(0)
2009	Ternopil		
2010–2015	Volyn Lutsk	18	(0)
2016–2017	Slavia Mozyr	8	(1)
2018–2021	Melnytsia		
- * Club domestic league appearances and goals

Roman Petrovych Hodovanyi (Ukrainian: Роман Петрович Годований; 4 October 1990 – 29 November 2023) was a Ukrainian professional footballer who played as a defender.

== Football career ==
Hodovanyi attended the different Sportive youth schools in Ternopil. He made his debut for FC Volyn Lutsk, played as substitute in the game against FC Naftovyk-Ukrnafta Okhtyrka on 29 March 2010 in Ukrainian First League.

== Military career and death ==
With the beginning of the full-scale Russian invasion of Ukraine in 2022, Hodovanyi joined the Ukrainian Army with the 33rd Mechanized Brigade. He died on 29 November 2023 during a combat mission. He was survived by his wife and two children.

== See also ==
- List of Ukrainian sports figures killed during the Russo-Ukrainian war
