= Semyon Pomogayev =

Russian footballer

Personal information
- Full name: Semyon Vyacheslavovich Pomogayev
- Date of birth: 1 November 1993 (age 32)
- Place of birth: Yekaterinburg, Russia
- Height: 1.86 m (6 ft 1 in)
- Position: Midfielder

Senior career*
Years	Team	Apps	(Gls)
2012	FC Tyumen	6	(0)
2013–2015	FC Ural Sverdlovsk Oblast	3	(0)
2014	→ FC Dynamo Saint Petersburg (loan)	10	(1)
2016	FC Baltika Kaliningrad	9	(2)
2017–2018	FC Ural-2 Yekaterinburg	9	(0)
Total		37	(3)
- * Club domestic league appearances and goals

Semyon Vyacheslavovich Pomogayev (Russian: Семён Вячеславович Помогаев; born 1 November 1993) is a Russian former footballer who played as a central midfielder.

== Club career ==
Pomogayev made his debut in the Russian Second Division for FC Tyumen on 16 September 2012, in a game against FC Lada-Togliatti Togliatti.

He made his Russian Football National League debut for FC Ural Yekaterinburg on 1 April 2013, in a game against FC Tom Tomsk.

== Career statistics ==
=== Club ===
As of 8 December 2017

Club	Season	League			Cup		Continental		Total	
Club	Season	Division	Apps	Goals	Apps	Goals	Apps	Goals	Apps	Goals
FC Tyumen	2012–13	PFL	6	0	0	0	–		6	0
FC Ural Yekaterinburg	2012–13	FNL	3	0	–		–		3	0
FC Ural Yekaterinburg	2013–14	Russian Premier League	0	0	0	0	–		0	0
FC Dynamo St. Petersburg	2013–14	FNL	10	1	–		–		10	1
FC Ural Yekaterinburg	2014–15	Russian Premier League	0	0	0	0	–		0	0
FC Baltika Kaliningrad	2016–17	FNL	9	2	1	0	–		10	2
FC Ural Yekaterinburg	2017–18	Russian Premier League	0	0	0	0	–		0	0
FC Ural Yekaterinburg	Total (3 spells)		3	0	0	0	0	0	3	0
FC Ural-2 Yekaterinburg	2017–18	PFL	9	0	–		–		9	0
Career total			37	3	1	0	0	0	38	3
