= Dmitri Arapov =

Russian professional football goalkeeper

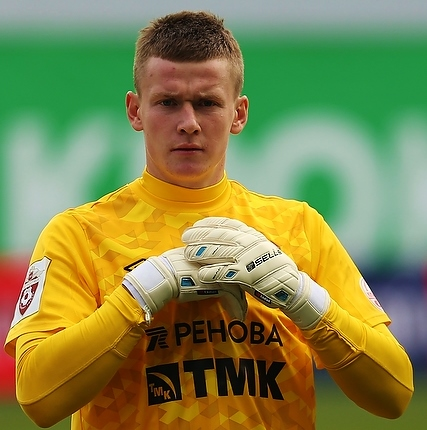
- Arapov with Ural in 2015

Personal information
- Full name: Dmitri Andreyevich Arapov
- Date of birth: 9 June 1993 (age 33)
- Place of birth: Kushva, Russia
- Height: 1.85 m (6 ft 1 in)
- Position: Goalkeeper

Senior career*
Years	Team	Apps	(Gls)
2012–2019	Ural Yekaterinburg	18	(0)
2017	→ Ural-2 Yekaterinburg	3	(0)
2018	→ Volgar Astrakhan (loan)	8	(0)
2018–2019	→ Chayka Peschanokopskoye (loan)	21	(0)
2019–2020	Chayka Peschanokopskoye	16	(0)
2020–2022	Tom Tomsk	42	(0)
2022–2024	Irtysh Omsk	37	(0)
2024	Ural Yekaterinburg	3	(0)
- * Club domestic league appearances and goals as of 27 November 2024

Dmitri Andreyevich Arapov (Russian: Дми́трий Андре́евич Ара́пов; born 9 June 1993) is a Russian professional football goalkeeper.

== Club career ==
He made his professional debut on 23 May 2015 for Ural Yekaterinburg in a Russian Premier League game against Torpedo Moscow when the first-choice Ural goalkeeper Nikolai Zabolotny was sent off for a professional foul. He started in Ural's next league game on 30 May 2015 against Terek Grozny as Zabolotny received an automatic one-game suspension for the sending off.

== Career statistics ==
=== Club ===
As of 13 May 2018

Club	Season	League			Cup		Continental		Other		Total	
Club	Season	Division	Apps	Goals	Apps	Goals	Apps	Goals	Apps	Goals	Apps	Goals
Ural Yekaterinburg	2011–12	FNL	0	0	0	0	–		–		0	0
Ural Yekaterinburg	2012–13	FNL	0	0	0	0	–		–		0	0
Ural Yekaterinburg	2013–14	Russian Premier League	0	0	0	0	–		–		0	0
Ural Yekaterinburg	2014–15	Russian Premier League	2	0	0	0	–		2 (Note: Two appearances in relegation play-offs)	0	4	0
Ural Yekaterinburg	2015–16	Russian Premier League	9	0	2	0	–		–		11	0
Ural Yekaterinburg	2016–17	Russian Premier League	7	0	1	0	–		–		8	0
Ural Yekaterinburg	2017–18	Russian Premier League	0	0	1	0	–		–		1	0
Ural Yekaterinburg	Total		18	0	4	0	0	0	2	0	24	0
Ural-2 Yekaterinburg	2017–18	PFL	3	0	–		–		–		3	0
Volgar Astrakhan	2017–18	FNL	8	0	–		–		–		8	0
Career total			29	0	4	0	0	0	2	0	35	0
