= Rezo Gavtadze =

Georgian-born Russian footballer

Personal information
- Full name: Rezo Davidovich Gavtadze
- Date of birth: 11 July 1995 (age 31)
- Place of birth: Zestaponi, Georgia
- Height: 1.77 m (5 ft 10 in)
- Position: Midfielder

Youth career
- 2013–2017: Ural Yekaterinburg

Senior career*
| Years | Team | Apps | (Gls) |
| 2016 | Ural Yekaterinburg | 1 | (0) |
| 2017–2018 | Ural-2 Yekaterinburg | 8 | (1) |
| 2019 | FC Spaeri Tbilisi | | |
| 2020–2021 | Chikhura Sachkhere | 8 | (0) |
| 2021 | TSK Simferopol | | |
- * Club domestic league appearances and goals

Rezo Davidovich Gavtadze (Russian: Резо Давидович Гавтадзе; born 11 July 1995) is a Georgian former professional football player who played as a left midfielder. He also holds Russian citizenship.

== Club career ==
He made his professional debut on 19 March 2016 for FC Ural Sverdlovsk Oblast in a Russian Premier League game against FC Terek Grozny.
