= Aleksei Mamin =

Russian footballer (born 1999)

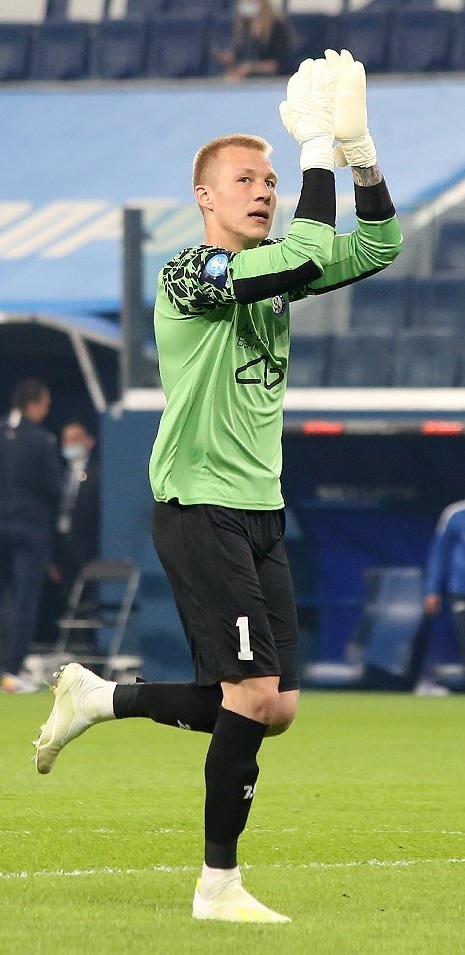
- Mamin with KAMAZ in 2022

Personal information
- Full name: Aleksei Vitalyevich Mamin
- Date of birth: 22 March 1999 (age 27)
- Place of birth: Yekaterinburg, Russia
- Height: 1.87 m (6 ft 2 in)
- Position: Goalkeeper

Team information
- Current team: Volgar Astrakhan (on loan from Ural Yekaterinburg)
- Number: 71

Youth career
- –2018: Ural Yekaterinburg

Senior career*
Years	Team	Apps	(Gls)
2018–	Ural Yekaterinburg	23	(0)
2018–2019	→ Ural-2 Yekaterinburg	14	(0)
2020–2023	→ KAMAZ (loan)	76	(0)
2026	→ Ural-2 Yekaterinburg	3	(0)
2026–	→ Volgar Astrakhan (loan)	5	(0)
- * Club domestic league appearances and goals as of 15 November 2026

Aleksei Vitalyevich Mamin (Russian: Алексей Витальевич Мамин; born 22 March 1999) is a Russian football player who plays for Volgar Astrakhan on loan from Ural Yekaterinburg.

== Club career ==
Mamin was raised in Ural Yekaterinburg youth system and was first called up to the senior squad in December 2019.

On 17 June 2020, he joined KAMAZ Naberezhnye Chelny on loan for the 2020–21 season. He started 23 games for KAMAZ and helped the club achieve promotion to the second-tier Russian Football National League. On 2 July 2021, he returned to KAMAZ on another loan.

Mamin made his debut in the Russian Football National League for KAMAZ on 23 July 2021 in a game against Olimp-Dolgoprudny.

On 8 July 2022, Mamin returned to KAMAZ for a third loan.

Mamin made his Russian Premier League debut for Ural on 25 May 2024 against CSKA Moscow.

== Personal life ==
His older brother Artyom Mamin is also a football player.

== Career statistics ==
As of 1 June 2024

Club	Season	League			Cup		Continental		Other		Total	
Club	Season	Division	Apps	Goals	Apps	Goals	Apps	Goals	Apps	Goals	Apps	Goals
Ural-2 Yekaterinburg	2018–19	Russian Second League	4	0	–		–		–		4	0
Ural-2 Yekaterinburg	2019–20	Russian Second League	10	0	–		–		–		10	0
Ural-2 Yekaterinburg	Total		14	0	0	0	0	0	0	0	14	0
Ural Yekaterinburg	2018–19	Russian Premier League	0	0	0	0	–		1 (Note: Appearances in the FNL Cup)	0	1	0
Ural Yekaterinburg	2019–20	Russian Premier League	0	0	0	0	–		1	0	1	0
Ural Yekaterinburg	2023–24	Russian Premier League	1	0	5	0	–		1 (Note: Appearances in the relegation play-offs)	0	7	0
Ural Yekaterinburg	Total		1	0	5	0	0	0	3	0	9	0
KAMAZ (loan)	2020–21	Russian Second League	23	0	0	0	–		–		23	0
KAMAZ (loan)	2021–22	Russian First League	21	0	2	0	–		–		23	0
KAMAZ (loan)	2022–23	Russian First League	32	0	0	0	–		–		32	0
KAMAZ (loan)	Total		76	0	2	0	0	0	3	0	78	0
Career total			91	0	7	0	0	0	3	0	101	0
