= Islamzhan Nasyrov =

Russian footballer

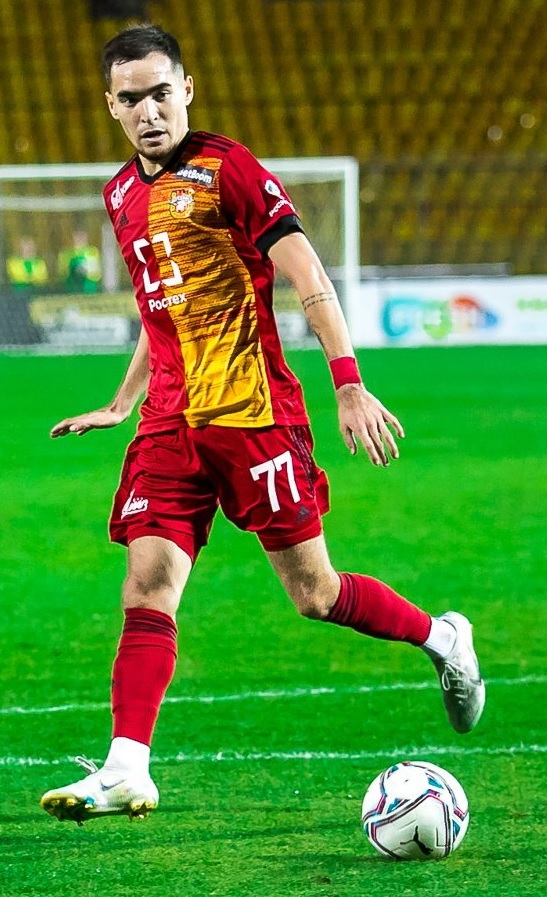
- Nasyrov with Arsenal Tula in 2022

Personal information
- Full name: Islamzhan Kasymzhanovich Nasyrov
- Date of birth: 8 April 1998 (age 28)
- Place of birth: Luzhki, Orenburg Oblast, Russia
- Height: 1.79 m (5 ft 10 in)
- Position: Left-back

Team information
- Current team: Ryazan
- Number: 77

Youth career
- 2012–2015: Nosta Novotroitsk

Senior career*
Years	Team	Apps	(Gls)
2015–2019	Nosta Novotroitsk	70	(2)
2019–2022	Ural Yekaterinburg	8	(0)
2019	→ Ural-2 Yekaterinburg	5	(2)
2020	→ Orenburg (loan)	11	(0)
2021	→ Ural-2 Yekaterinburg	10	(3)
2021–2022	→ Tyumen (loan)	19	(2)
2022–2023	Arsenal Tula	28	(0)
2023–2024	Rodina Moscow	8	(0)
2024	→ Tyumen (loan)	13	(1)
2024	Torpedo Moscow	1	(0)
2025	Volgar Astrakhan	8	(0)
2025–2026	Murom	7	(0)
2026	Amkar Perm	11	(0)
2026–	Ryazan	9	(0)
- * Club domestic league appearances and goals as of 31 October 2026

Islamzhan Kasymzhanovich Nasyrov (Russian: Исламжан Касымжанович Насыров; Kazakh: Исламжан Қасымжанұлы Насыров; born 8 April 1998) is a Russian Kazakh football player who plays as a left-back or a left midfielder for Ryazan.

== Club career ==
He made his debut in the Russian Professional Football League for Nosta Novotroitsk on 27 September 2015 in a game against Neftekhimik Nizhnekamsk.

On 24 July 2019, he signed with Russian Premier League club Ural Yekaterinburg. He made his RPL debut for Ural on 17 August 2019 in a game against Krylia Sovetov Samara, as a starter.

On 3 September 2021, he joined Tyumen on loan.
