= Artyom Shabolin =

Russian footballer (born 2000)

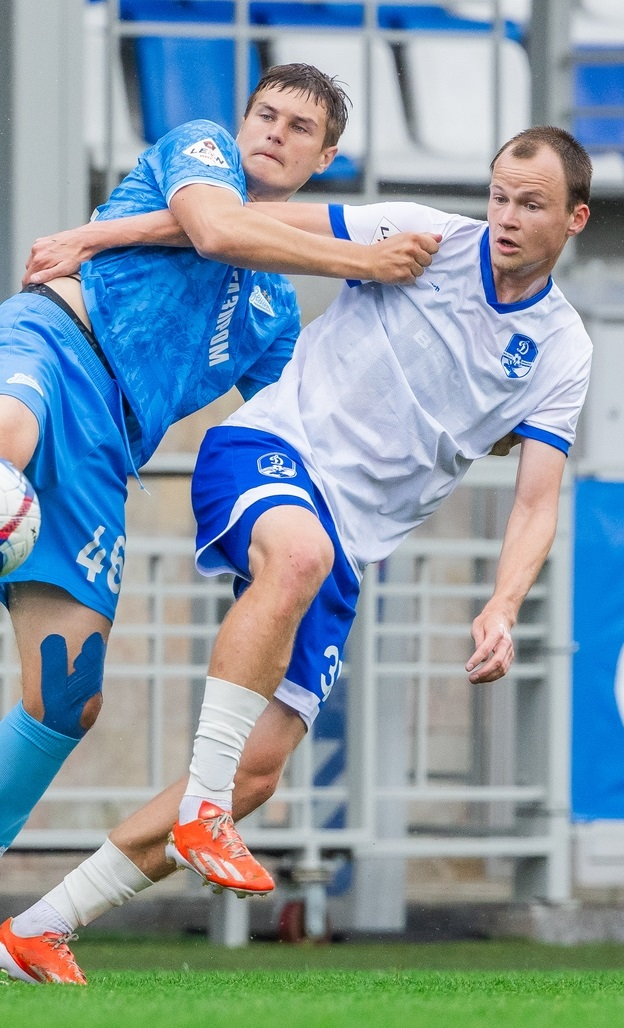
- Shabolin with Dynamo Vologda in 2025

Personal information
- Full name: Artyom Alekseyevich Shabolin
- Date of birth: 19 July 2000 (age 26)
- Place of birth: Barnaul, Russia
- Height: 1.86 m (6 ft 1 in)
- Position: Attacking midfielder

Youth career
- –2012: SDYuShOR A. Smertina Barnaul
- 2012: Konoplyov football academy
- 2013–2014: Dynamo Moscow
- 2015–2017: SDYuShOR A. Smertina Barnaul
- 2018: Dynamo Barnaul
- 2018: SDYuShOR A. Smertina Barnaul

Senior career*
Years	Team	Apps	(Gls)
2018–2019	Nosta Novotroitsk	16	(3)
2019–2022	Ural Yekaterinburg	10	(1)
2019–2020	→ Ural-2 Yekaterinburg	14	(4)
2021	→ Yenisey Krasnoyarsk (loan)	4	(0)
2021–2022	→ Orenburg (loan)	19	(1)
2022	→ Ural-2 Yekaterinburg	15	(2)
2023	Novosibirsk	10	(0)
2023	Dynamo Barnaul	8	(1)
2024	Leon Saturn Ramenskoye	29	(6)
2025–2026	Dynamo Vologda	41	(9)
- * Club domestic league appearances and goals as of 9 August 2026

Artyom Alekseyevich Shabolin (Russian: Артём Алексеевич Шаболин; born 19 July 2000) is a Russian football player.

== Club career ==
He made his debut in the Russian Professional Football League for Nosta Novotroitsk on 16 September 2018 in a game against Syzran-2003.

On 27 June 2019, he signed a long-term contract with Russian Premier League club Ural Yekaterinburg. He made his debut for the main squad of Ural Yekaterinburg on 25 September 2019 in a Russian Cup game against Chernomorets Novorossiysk. He made his Russian Premier League debut on 14 March 2020 in a game against Zenit Saint Petersburg, substituting Nikolay Dimitrov in the 67th minute.
