= Saša Stević =

Bosnian Serb footballer

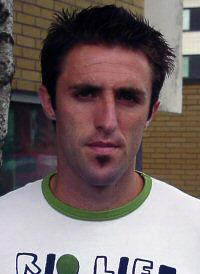
- Stevic in 2010

Personal information
- Date of birth: 31 May 1981 (age 45)
- Place of birth: Banja Luka, SFR Yugoslavia
- Height: 1.90 m (6 ft 3 in)
- Position: Central midfielder

Senior career*
Years	Team	Apps	(Gls)
1997–2001	Rudar Prijedor	71	(7)
2001–2005	Borac Čačak	86	(6)
2005–2006	FF Jaro	26	(3)
2007	IFK Mariehamn	14	(0)
2008–2009	Banat Zrenjanin	28	(4)
2010	Ceahlăul Piatra Neamţ	15	(0)
2010–2013	Volyn Lutsk	40	(2)
2014–2016	Zemun		
- * Club domestic league appearances and goals

Saša Stević (Serbian Cyrillic: Саша Стевић; born 31 May 1981) is a former professional Bosnian Serb footballer.

== Club career ==
Born in Banja Luka, SR Bosnia and Herzegovina. In 1997, Saša began his football career playing for Rudar Prijedor as a 16-year-old. He made his debut against FK Glasinac Sokolac. Stević played for Rudar Prijedor until 2001 when he moved to Serbian club FK Borac Čačak where he played from 2001 until 2005. Then, he moved to Finland to play in Veikkausliiga club FF Jaro where he played the seasons 2005 and 2006. In 2007, he moved to another Finish club IFK Mariehamn.

In summer 2008 he returned to the Serbian SuperLiga by joining FK Banat Zrenjanin. Played there season and half. And on winter transfers window 2010 he moved to Romania by joining Liga I side Ceahlăul Piatra Neamţ where he played the rest of the season. In summer 2010 he moved to Ukraine and joined FC Volyn Lutsk.

He played much of his career in a central midfield role, but he has also been used as a central defender.
