= Abayomi Owonikoko Seun =

Nigerian-Georgian footballer

Personal information
- Full name: Abayomi Owonikoko Seun
- Date of birth: September 13, 1992 (age 34)
- Place of birth: Lagos, Nigeria
- Height: 1.85 m (6 ft 1 in)
- Position: Striker

Team information
- Current team: Mirandela

Senior career*
Years	Team	Apps	(Gls)
2009–2014	Gagra	60	(21)
2012	→ Zestaponi (loan)	10	(1)
2012–2013	→ Volyn Lutsk (loan)	15	(1)
2014	Valletta	3	(1)
2014–	Mirandela	20	(0)
- * Club domestic league appearances and goals as of 11 July 2015

Abayomi Owonikoko Seun (born September 13, 1992) is a Nigerian-Georgian footballer under contract from 2014 for Mirandela.
