= Yuri Bavin =

Russian footballer (born 1994)

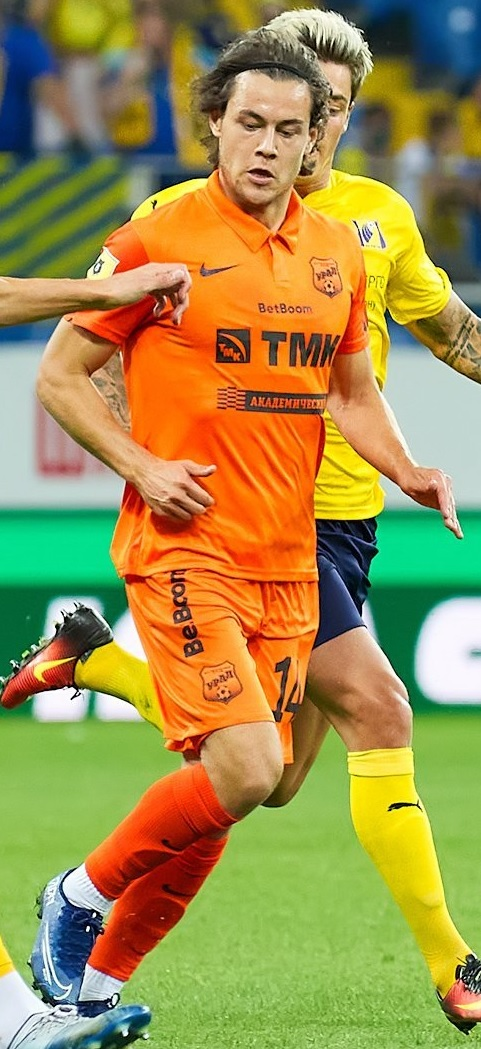
- Bavin with Ural in 2020

Personal information
- Full name: Yuri Sergeyevich Bavin
- Date of birth: 5 February 1994 (age 32)
- Place of birth: Slautnoye, Russia
- Height: 1.74 m (5 ft 9 in)
- Position: Midfielder

Youth career
- 2011–2014: PFC CSKA Moscow

Senior career*
Years	Team	Apps	(Gls)
2013–2014	PFC CSKA Moscow	0	(0)
2014–2016	União de Leiria	27	(3)
2016–2017	FC Zenit St. Petersburg	1	(0)
2016–2017	→ FC Zenit-2 St. Petersburg	45	(1)
2017–2023	FC Ural Yekaterinburg	55	(4)
2021	→ FC Tambov (loan)	10	(0)
2021	→ FC Ural-2 Yekaterinburg	3	(0)
2021–2022	→ FC Rotor Volgograd (loan)	3	(0)
2022–2023	→ FC SKA-Khabarovsk (loan)	28	(0)
2023–2024	FC SKA-Khabarovsk	30	(1)
2025	FC Yenisey Krasnoyarsk	8	(0)
2026	FC Irtysh Omsk	17	(0)

International career
2011–2012	Russia U-18	7	(1)
2012–2013	Russia U-19	10	(2)
- * Club domestic league appearances and goals as of 13 June 2026

Yuri Sergeyevich Bavin (Russian: Юрий Сергеевич Бавин; born 5 February 1994) is a Russian football player who plays as a defensive midfielder.

== Club career ==
He made his debut for the main squad of PFC CSKA Moscow in a Russian Cup game against FC Khimik Dzerzhinsk on 30 October 2013.

He made his debut in the Russian Football National League for FC Zenit-2 St. Petersburg on 12 March 2016 in a game against FC Volgar Astrakhan.

He made his Russian Premier League debut for FC Zenit St. Petersburg on 21 May 2016 in a game against FC Dynamo Moscow.

On 25 February 2021 he moved to Russian club FC Tambov, on a loan deal until the end of the season.

On 12 August 2021, he moved to FC Rotor Volgograd on loan for the 2021–22 season. On 24 August 2022, Bavin was loaned to FC SKA-Khabarovsk. Bavin's contract with Ural expired in June 2023 and was not extended.

== Career statistics ==
=== Club ===
As of 13 May 2018

Club	Season	League			Cup		Continental		Total	
Club	Season	Division	Apps	Goals	Apps	Goals	Apps	Goals	Apps	Goals
CSKA Moscow	2011–12	Russian Premier League	0	0	0	0	0	0	0	0
CSKA Moscow	2012–13	Russian Premier League	0	0	0	0	0	0	0	0
CSKA Moscow	2013–14	Russian Premier League	0	0	1	0	0	0	1	0
CSKA Moscow	Total		0	0	1	0	0	0	1	0
União de Leiria	2014–15	Campeonato de Portugal	19	3	–		–		19	3
União de Leiria	2015–16	Campeonato de Portugal	8	0	–		–		8	0
União de Leiria	Total		27	3	0	0	0	0	27	3
Zenit-2 St. Petersburg	2015–16	FNL	11	0	–		–		11	0
Zenit-2 St. Petersburg	2016–17	FNL	34	1	–		–		34	1
Zenit-2 St. Petersburg	Total		45	1	0	0	0	0	45	1
Zenit St. Petersburg	2015–16	Russian Premier League	1	0	0	0	0	0	1	0
Zenit St. Petersburg	2016–17	Russian Premier League	0	0	0	0	0	0	0	0
Zenit St. Petersburg	Total		1	0	0	0	0	0	1	0
Ural Yekaterinburg	2017–18	Russian Premier League	17	0	1	0	–		18	0
Career total			90	4	2	0	0	0	92	4
