= Ihor Skoba =

Ukrainian footballer (born 1982)

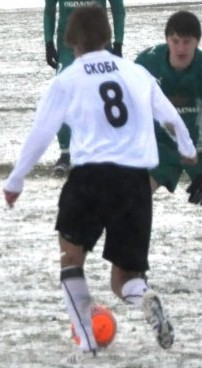

Personal information
- Full name: Ihor Olehovych Skoba
- Date of birth: 21 May 1982 (age 44)
- Place of birth: Dzhankoy, Ukrainian SSR
- Height: 1.88 m (6 ft 2 in)
- Position: Midfielder

Youth career
- 1998: Dynamo Kyiv

Senior career*
Years	Team	Apps	(Gls)
1998–2003	Dynamo Kyiv	2	(0)
1998–2002	→ Dynamo-3 Kyiv	71	(8)
1998–2002	→ Dynamo-2 Kyiv	48	(11)
2002	→ Zakarpattia Uzhhorod (loan)	11	(1)
2002	→ Zakarpattia-2 Uzhhorod (loan)	1	(0)
2003	→ Obolon Kyiv (loan)	11	(1)
2003–2006	Arsenal Kyiv	29	(0)
2004	→ CSKA Kyiv	2	(1)
2004	→ Arsenal-2 Kyiv	1	(0)
2006–2007	Illichivets Mariupol	29	(0)
2007	→ Illichivets-2 Mariupol	3	(0)
2008–2010	Zorya Luhansk	41	(5)
2010	Volyn Lutsk	9	(2)
2011	Sevastopol	17	(2)
2011–2014	Volyn Lutsk	41	(1)
2014–2015	Stomil Olsztyn	12	(3)
2015–2016	Arsenal Kyiv	14	(5)

International career
2003	Ukraine U21	1	(0)
- * Club domestic league appearances and goals

Ihor Skoba (Ukrainian: Ігор Олегович Скоба; born 21 May 1982) is a Ukrainian former professional footballer who plays as a midfielder.
