= Artyom Yusupov =

Russian footballer

Personal information
- Full name: Artyom Aleksandrovich Yusupov
- Date of birth: 29 April 1997 (age 29)
- Place of birth: Yekaterinburg, Russia
- Height: 1.90 m (6 ft 3 in)
- Positions: Midfielder; forward

Senior career*
Years	Team	Apps	(Gls)
2014–2022	FC Ural Yekaterinburg	8	(0)
2017–2018	→ FC Ural-2 Yekaterinburg	9	(3)
2017–2018	→ FC Tyumen (loan)	29	(6)
2019	→ FC Zenit-2 Saint Petersburg (loan)	5	(1)
2019–2020	→ FC Ural-2 Yekaterinburg	13	(6)
2020	→ FC Orenburg (loan)	10	(2)
2021–2022	→ FC Volgar Astrakhan (loan)	45	(4)
2022–2024	FC Irtysh Omsk	47	(8)
2024	FC Uralets-TS Nizhny Tagil	11	(2)
- * Club domestic league appearances and goals as of 19 October 2024

Artyom Aleksandrovich Yusupov (Russian: Артём Александрович Юсупов; born 29 April 1997) is a Russian football player.

== Club career ==
He made his debut in the Russian Premier League for FC Ural Yekaterinburg on 29 April 2017 in a game against FC Terek Grozny.

On 27 January 2021, he joined FC Volgar Astrakhan on loan until the end of the 2020–21 season. On 10 June 2021, he returned to Volgar on a new loan for the 2021–22 season.

== Career statistics ==
As of 13 May 2018

Club	Season	League			Cup		Continental		Total	
Club	Season	Division	Apps	Goals	Apps	Goals	Apps	Goals	Apps	Goals
Ural Yekaterinburg	2013–14	Russian Premier League	0	0	0	0	–		0	0
Ural Yekaterinburg	2014–15	Russian Premier League	0	0	0	0	–		0	0
Ural Yekaterinburg	2015–16	Russian Premier League	0	0	0	0	–		0	0
Ural Yekaterinburg	2016–17	Russian Premier League	1	0	0	0	–		1	0
Ural Yekaterinburg	2017–18	Russian Premier League	1	0	0	0	–		1	0
Ural Yekaterinburg	Total		2	0	0	0	0	0	2	0
Ural-2 Yekaterinburg	2017–18	PFL	3	0	–		–		3	0
Tyumen	2017–18	FNL	29	6	2	0	–		31	6
Career total			34	6	2	0	0	0	36	6
