= Nikita Glushkov (footballer, born 1994) =

Russian footballer

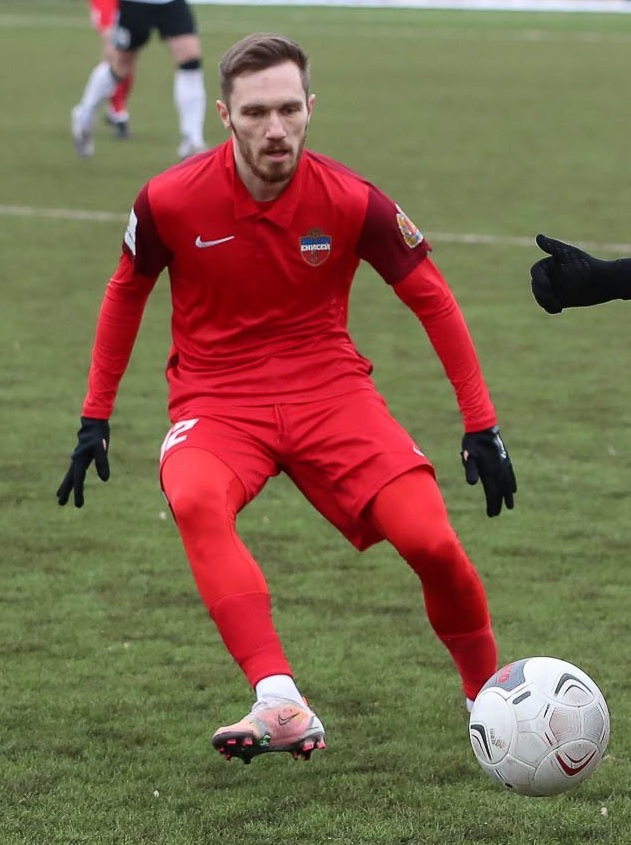
- Glushkov with Yenisey in 2021

Personal information
- Full name: Nikita Andreyevich Glushkov
- Date of birth: 23 June 1994 (age 32)
- Place of birth: Kirov, Russia
- Height: 1.72 m (5 ft 8 in)
- Position: Midfielder

Team information
- Current team: Arsenal Tula
- Number: 19

Youth career
- –2008: Dynamo Kirov
- 2008–2011: Nika Moscow
- 2011–2012: Sokol Moscow
- 2012–2013: Dynamo Moscow

Senior career*
Years	Team	Apps	(Gls)
2013–2014	Slavoj Trebišov	18	(0)
2014	Sokol Moscow		
2015	Khimki-M (amateur)		
2016	Sibir Novosibirsk	23	(1)
2017–2020	Ural Yekaterinburg	10	(0)
2017–2018	Ural-2 Yekaterinburg	11	(5)
2018–2020	→ Baltika Kaliningrad (loan)	33	(2)
2020–2024	Yenisey Krasnoyarsk	98	(18)
2024	Akron Tolyatti	13	(5)
2024–2025	Baltika Kaliningrad	10	(0)
2025	→ Maxline Vitebsk (loan)	13	(5)
2025–2026	Maxline Vitebsk	25	(6)
2026–	Arsenal Tula	0	(0)
- * Club domestic league appearances and goals as of 4 July 2026

Nikita Andreyevich Glushkov (Russian: Ники́та Андре́евич Глушко́в; born 23 June 1994) is a Russian professional football player who plays as a left winger for Arsenal Tula.

== Club career ==
He made his debut in the Russian Football National League for Sibir Novosibirsk on 11 July 2016 in a game against Spartak Moscow 2.

On 28 December 2016, he signed a contract with the Russian Premier League side Ural Yekaterinburg. He made his Russian Premier League debut for Ural on 29 April 2017 in a game against Terek Grozny.

On 29 December 2018, he joined Baltika Kaliningrad on loan until the end of the 2018–19 season. On 18 June 2019, he rejoined Baltika on a season-long loan.

== Career statistics ==
As of 25 May 2024

Club	Season	League			Cup		Continental		Other		Total	
Club	Season	Division	Apps	Goals	Apps	Goals	Apps	Goals	Apps	Goals	Apps	Goals
Slavoj Trebišov	2014–15	2. Liga	18	0	–		–		–		18	0
Sibir Novosibirsk	2016–17	Russian First League	23	1	2	0	–		–		25	1
Ural Yekaterinburg	2016–17	Russian Premier League	2	0	1	0	–		5 (Note: Appearances in the FNL Cup)	0	8	0
Ural Yekaterinburg	2017–18	Russian Premier League	8	0	1	0	–		3	0	12	0
Ural Yekaterinburg	2018–19	Russian Premier League	0	0	0	0	–		–		0	0
Ural Yekaterinburg	Total		10	0	2	0	0	0	8	0	20	0
Ural-2 Yekaterinburg	2017–18	Russian Second League	4	0	–		–		–		4	0
Ural-2 Yekaterinburg	2018–19	Russian Second League	7	5	–		–		–		7	5
Ural-2 Yekaterinburg	Total		11	5	0	0	0	0	0	0	11	5
Baltika Kaliningrad (loan)	2018–19	Russian First League	11	0	–		–		–		11	0
Baltika Kaliningrad (loan)	2019–20	Russian First League	22	2	3	0	–		–		25	2
Baltika Kaliningrad (loan)	Total		33	2	3	0	0	0	0	0	36	2
Yenisey Krasnoyarsk	2020–21	Russian First League	37	3	3	0	–		–		40	3
Yenisey Krasnoyarsk	2021–22	Russian First League	13	4	3	1	–		–		16	5
Yenisey Krasnoyarsk	2022–23	Russian First League	29	9	0	0	–		2 (Note: Appearances in the promotion play-offs)	0	31	9
Yenisey Krasnoyarsk	2023–24	Russian First League	19	2	0	0	–		–		19	2
Yenisey Krasnoyarsk	Total		98	18	6	1	0	0	2	0	106	19
Akron Tolyatti	2023–24	Russian First League	13	5	–		–		2	0	15	5
Baltika Kaliningrad	2024–25	Russian Premier League	0	0	0	0	—		—		0	0
Career total			206	31	13	1	0	0	12	0	231	32
