= 2014–15 FC Ural Sverdlovsk Oblast season =

Ural
2014–15 season
- Chairman: Grigori Ivanov
- Manager: Alexander Tarkhanov
- Stadium: Central Stadium, Yekaterinburg(1st half) Geolog Stadium, Tyumen (2nd half); Ural Stadium (reserve)
- Russian Premier League: 13th
- Relegation play-offs: Winners vs Tom Tomsk
- Russian Cup: Round of 32 vs Krylia Sovetov
- Top goalscorer: League: Fyodor Smolov (8); All: Fyodor Smolov (8)
- Highest home attendance: 19,500 vs Zenit St. Petersburg (13 August 2014)
- Lowest home attendance: 1,500 vs Ufa (8 May 2015)
- Average home league attendance: 7,357; 19 May 2015
Home colours	Away colours

The 2014–15 Ural season was the 2nd successive season that the club played in the Russian Premier League, the highest tier of association football in Russia, and 7th in total. Ural also took part in the Russian Cup.

== Squad ==
As of 3 February 2015, according to the official RFPL website.

Note: Flags indicate national team as defined under FIFA eligibility rules; some limited exceptions apply. Players may hold more than one non-FIFA nationality.

No.	Pos.	Nation	Player
2	DF	RUS	Vladimir Khozin
3	FW	ZAM	Chisamba Lungu
5	MF	RUS	Roman Yemelyanov
7	DF	RUS	Aleksandr Dantsev
8	MF	RUS	Ivan Chudin
9	FW	RUS	Spartak Gogniyev
10	FW	ARM	Edgar Manucharyan
12	DF	RUS	Aleksandr Novikov
14	MF	RUS	Vyacheslav Podberyozkin
16	FW	RUS	Arsen Goshokov
17	MF	RUS	Andrei Gorbanets
21	MF	CHI	Gerson Acevedo
24	DF	RUS	Denis Fomin
25	FW	RUS	Aleksandr Stavpets
26	MF	RUS	Aleksandr Shcherbakov
28	GK	RUS	Nikolay Zabolotnyi

No.	Pos.	Nation	Player
29	DF	ARG	Pablo Fontanello
33	GK	RUS	Igor Kot
34	FW	RUS	Denis Dorozhkin
36	MF	RUS	Ilya Korelin
41	MF	RUS	Aleksandr Sapeta
48	DF	RUS	Denis Drozhalkin
50	DF	UZB	Nikolai Markov (on loan from Krasnodar)
51	GK	RUS	Yevgeni Zharikov
57	MF	RUS	Artyom Fidler
63	DF	RUS	Aleksandr Belozyorov
64	MF	RUS	Vladislav Zolotukhin
65	DF	RUS	Alan Bagayev
88	DF	RUS	Aleksei Gerasimov
89	MF	RUS	Aleksandr Yerokhin
90	FW	RUS	Fyodor Smolov (loan from Dynamo Moscow)
99	MF	UKR	Kostyantyn Yaroshenko

=== Out on loan ===
Note: Flags indicate national team as defined under FIFA eligibility rules; some limited exceptions apply. Players may hold more than one non-FIFA nationality.

No.	Pos.	Nation	Player
18	FW	RUS	Georgi Nurov (at Baltika Kaliningrad)
19	FW	RUS	Arsen Goshokov (at Spartak Nalchik)

No.	Pos.	Nation	Player
20	MF	RUS	Igor Lambarschi (at Tyumen)

== Transfers ==
=== Summer ===
In: Note: Flags indicate national team as defined under FIFA eligibility rules; some limited exceptions apply. Players may hold more than one non-FIFA nationality.

No.	Pos.	Nation	Player
4	DF	AUT	Markus Berger (from (Norway) Start)
5	MF	RUS	Roman Yemelyanov (loan from (Ukraine) Shakhtar Donetsk, previously on loan to (Russia) Rostov)
8	MF	RUS	Ivan Chudin (end of loan to (Russia) Volga Ulyanovsk)
14	MF	RUS	Vyacheslav Podberyozkin (from (Russia) Lokomotiv Moscow)
15	MF	RUS	Arsen Oganesyan (from (Russia) Kaluga)
18	FW	RUS	Georgi Nurov (from (Russia) Rubin Kazan)
20	MF	RUS	Igor Lambarschi (from (Russia) Krasnodar)
22	GK	RUS	Aleksandr Shubin
29	DF	ARG	Pablo Fontanello (from (Norway) Stabæk)
38	MF	RUS	Nikita Mamonov
41	MF	RUS	Aleksandr Sapeta (from (Russia) Dynamo Moscow, previously on loan)
43	MF	RUS	Pavel Repin
55	MF	RUS	Anatoli Sedov
69	DF	RUS	Aleksei Nelyubin
80	MF	RUS	Yegor Zlygostev
81	FW	RUS	Semyon Voronov
82	MF	RUS	Vladimir Lisov
84	DF	RUS	Yevgeni Ivanov
89	MF	RUS	Aleksandr Yerokhin (from (Russia) SKA-Energiya Khabarovsk, previously on loan)
95	FW	RUS	Aleksandr Babushkin
99	MF	UKR	Kostyantyn Yaroshenko (from (Ukraine) Sevastopol)
—	DF	RUS	Adessoye Oyewole (end of loan to (Russia) Gazovik Orenburg)
—	MF	RUS	Ivan Melnik (end of loan to (Russia) Dynamo St. Petersburg)
—	MF	RUS	Semyon Pomogayev (end of loan to (Russia) Dynamo St. Petersburg)
—	FW	RUS	Fyodor Smolov (loan from (Russia) Dynamo Moscow)

Out: Note: Flags indicate national team as defined under FIFA eligibility rules; some limited exceptions apply. Players may hold more than one non-FIFA nationality.

No.	Pos.	Nation	Player
13	MF	RUS	Denis Tumasyan (on loan to (Russia) Ufa)
15	MF	RUS	Andrei Bochkov (on loan to (Russia) Tosno)
20	MF	BLR	Andrey Chukhley (to (Russia) Tyumen)
27	FW	RUS	Aleksandr Sobolev (on loan to (Russia) Kaluga)
30	MF	GEO	Lasha Gvalia (to (Georgia (country)) Zestafoni)
77	MF	RUS	Kantemir Berkhamov (to (Russia) Tosno)
78	MF	HUN	Vladimir Koman (end of loan from (Russia) Krasnodar)
99	MF	RUS	Maksim Sergeyev (to (Russia) Nosta Novotroitsk)

=== Winter ===
In: Note: Flags indicate national team as defined under FIFA eligibility rules; some limited exceptions apply. Players may hold more than one non-FIFA nationality.

No.	Pos.	Nation	Player
24	DF	RUS	Denis Fomin (from (Russia) Tekstilschik Ivanovo)
26	MF	RUS	Aleksandr Shcherbakov
36	MF	RUS	Ilya Korelin
48	DF	RUS	Denis Drozhalkin
51	GK	RUS	Yevgeni Zharikov
50	DF	UZB	Nikolai Markov (on loan from (Russia) Krasnodar)
64	MF	RUS	Vladislav Zolotukhin
88	DF	RUS	Aleksei Gerasimov (end of loan to (Russia) SKA-Energiya Khabarovsk)
92	MF	RUS	Roman Yemelyanov (from (Ukraine) Shakhtar Donetsk, previously on loan)

Out: Note: Flags indicate national team as defined under FIFA eligibility rules; some limited exceptions apply. Players may hold more than one non-FIFA nationality.

No.	Pos.	Nation	Player
4	DF	AUT	Markus Berger (to (Portugal) Gil Vicente)
6	DF	ISL	Sölvi Ottesen (to (China) Jiangsu Guoxin-Sainty)
11	MF	RUS	Aleksandr Shchanitsyn (to (Russia) Tekstilshchik Ivanovo)
15	MF	RUS	Arsen Oganesyan (to (Russia) Sokol Saratov)
18	FW	RUS	Georgi Nurov (on loan to (Russia) Baltika Kaliningrad)
19	FW	RUS	Arsen Goshokov (on loan to (Russia) Spartak Nalchik)
20	MF	RUS	Igor Lambarschi (on loan to (Russia) Tyumen)

== Competitions ==
=== Russian Premier League ===
==== Results by round ====
Round	1	2	3	4	5	6	7	8	9	10	11	12	13	14	15	16	17	18	19	20	21	22	23	24	25	26	27	28	29	30
Ground	H	H	H	H	A	H	A	A	H	H	H	A	H	H	A	A	A	A	A	H	A	A	H	A	A	A	H	H	A	A
Result	L	D	L	L	L	L	L	W	L	W	W	L	L	L	W	L	L	L	D	W	L	W	W	L	L	L	D	W	L	W
Position	10	11	14	13	14	15	15	15	15	13	13	13	13	13	12	12	13	13	13	12	13	11	11	12	13	14	14	13	14	13

Updated to match(es) played on 27 May 2015. Source: Russian Premier League
A = Away; H = Home; W = Win; D = Draw; L = Loss

==== Matches ====
2 August 2014 1	Ural	2–3	Mordovia Saransk	Yekaterinburg
18:30 YEKT (UTC+6)	Manucharyan 6' (pen.); Yaroshenko 86'	Summary	Donald 12'; Vlasov 45+2'; Lutsenko 73'	Stadium: Central Stadium; Attendance: 14,000; Referee: Kirill Levnikov

10 August 2014 2	Ural	1–1	Krasnodar	Yekaterinburg
18:30 YEKT (UTC+6)	Lungu 59'	Summary	Joãozinho 19' (pen.)	Stadium: Central Stadium; Attendance: 8,200; Referee: Vladislav Bezborodov

13 August 2014 3	Ural	1–2	Zenit St. Petersburg	Yekaterinburg
19:30 YEKT (UTC+6)	Acevedo 36'	Summary	Danny 5'; Rondón 74'	Stadium: Central Stadium; Attendance: 19,500; Referee: Mikhail Vilkov

16 August 2014 4	Ural	0–2	Torpedo Moscow	Yekaterinburg
19:00 YEKT (UTC+6)		Summary	Pugin 73'; Ottesen 90' (o.g.)	Stadium: Central Stadium; Attendance: 8,300; Referee: Vitaly Rushakov

24 August 2014 5	Dynamo Moscow	2–0	Ural	Ramenskoe
15:30 YEKT (UTC+6)	Ionov 20', 41'	Summary	Fontanello (yellow card) 34' (yellow-red card) 70'	Stadium: Saturn Stadium; Attendance: 6,111; Referee: Kirill Levnikov

29 August 2014 6	Ural	0–1	Terek Grozny	Yekaterinburg
20:00 YEKT (UTC+6)		Summary	Ivanov 68'	Stadium: Central Stadium; Attendance: 7,840; Referee: Igor Fedotov

15 September 2014 7	Amkar Perm	2–1	Ural	Perm
19:00 YEKT (UTC+6)	Dzakhov 5'; Peev 32'	Summary	Smolov 12'	Stadium: Zvezda Stadium; Attendance: 8,300; Referee: Sergey Lapochkin

20 September 2014 8	Ufa	0–1	Ural	Ufa
14:00 YET (UTC+6)		Summary	Yerokhin 42'	Stadium: Dynamo Stadium; Attendance: 4,400; Referee: Vladimir Moskalyov

27 September 2014 9	Ural	3–4	CSKA Moscow	Yekaterinburg
15:30 YET (UTC+6)	Manucharyan 10'; Smolov 55'; Yerokhin 83'	Summary	Dzagoev 29'; Eremenko 45+2'; Doumbia 69', 89'	Stadium: Central Stadium; Attendance: 12,200; Referee: Aleksandr Egorov

19 October 2014 10	Ural	2–0	Spartak Moscow	Yekaterinburg
15:30 YET (UTC+6)	Yerokhin 36'; Fontanello 65'	Summary		Stadium: Central Stadium; Attendance: 9,600; Referee: Vitali Meshkov

24 October 2014 11	Ural	1–0	Arsenal Tula	Yekaterinburg
19:00 YET (UTC+6)	Yerokhin 38'	Summary	Zotov (yellow card) 6'	Stadium: Ural Stadium (indoor game); Attendance: 2,100; Referee: Aleksei Eskov

31 October 2014 12	Rostov	1–0	Ural	Rostov-on-Don
21:00 YET (UTC+5)	Poloz 3'			Stadium: Olimp-2; Attendance: 5,100; Referee: Sergey Lapochkin

7 November 2014 13	Ural	0–1	Kuban Krasnodar	Yekaterinburg
18:00 YET (UTC+5)		Summary	Danilo 31' (pen.)	Stadium: Central Stadium; Attendance: 3,100; Referee: Sergey Kulikov

22 November 2014 14	Ural	1–3	Rubin Kazan	Yekaterinburg
14:00 YET (UTC+5)	Fidler (yellow card) 13'; Gogniyev 77'	Summary	Karadeniz 13'; Ozdoyev (yellow card) 47' (goal) 64'; Portnyagin 62'; Carlos Eduardo (yellow card) 89'; Ryzhikov (yellow card) 90+1'	Stadium: Central Stadium; Attendance: 4,200; Referee: Alexey Nikolaev

29 November 2014 15	Arsenal Tula	1–2	Ural	Tula
14:30 YET (UTC+5)	Lyakh (yellow card) 30'; Osipov (yellow card) 34'; Kašćelan (yellow card) 45+1'; Maslov 73'; Kutyin (yellow card) 90+3'	Summary	Yemelyanov (yellow card) 39'; Khozin 45'; Smolov 45+2'; Fontanello (yellow card) 48'; Manucharyan (yellow card) 65'	Stadium: Arsenal Stadium; Attendance: 7,500; Referee: Sergey Karasev

3 December 2014 16	Lokomotiv Moscow	1–0	Ural	Moscow
21:00 YET (UTC+5)	Boussoufa (yellow card) 53'; N'Doye 90'	Summary	Yemelyanov (yellow card) 18'; Stavpets (yellow card) 35'; Fidler (yellow card) 39'	Stadium: Lokomotiv Stadium; Attendance: 3,120; Referee: Kirill Levnikov

8 December 2014 17	Spartak Moscow	2–0	Ural	Moscow
22:00 YET (UTC+5)	Davydov (yellow card) 58'; Jurado 63'; Rômulo 85'	Summary	Smolov (yellow card) 53'; Podberyozkin (yellow card) 80'	Stadium: Otkrytie Arena; Attendance: 12,214; Referee: Vladimir Moskalyov

7 March 2015 18	Zenit St.Petersburg	3–0	Ural	Saint Petersburg
21:00 YET (UTC+5)	Rondón 45', 70', 78'	Summary	Podberyozkin (yellow card) 6'; Khozin (yellow card) 36'; Smolov (yellow card) 85'	Stadium: Petrovsky Stadium; Attendance: 17,606; Referee: Sergey Karasev

13 March 2015 19	Krasnodar	1–1	Ural	Krasnodar
21:00 YET (UTC+5)	Mamayev 45+1'	Summary	Fidler (yellow card) 49'; Smolov 50'	Stadium: Kuban Stadium; Attendance: 5,800; Referee: Aleksandr Egorov

21 March 2015 20	Ural	1–0	Amkar Perm	Yekaterinburg
14:00 YET (UTC+5)	Emelyanov (yellow card) 27'; Smolov (yellow card) 67'; Acevedo 78', (yellow card) 79'	Summary	Jakubko (yellow card) 12'; Zanev (yellow card) 29'; Ogude (yellow card) 34'	Stadium: Ural Stadium (indoor game); Attendance: 2,980; Referee: Aleksei Matyunin

5 April 2015 21	Ural	0–1	Rostov	Yekaterinburg
17:45 YET (UTC+5)	Acevedo (yellow card) 58'; Yemelyanov (yellow card) 72'; Smolov (yellow card) 73'	Summary	Novoseltsev (yellow card) 23'; Dzyuba 77'	Stadium: Ural Stadium; Attendance: 2,840; Referee: Mikhail Vilkov

8 April 2015 22	Kuban Krasnodar	0–2	Ural	Krasnodar
21:00 YET (UTC+5)		Summary	Smolov 44', 90'; Stavpets (yellow card) 88'	Stadium: Kuban Stadium; Attendance: 6,041; Referee: Vitaly Rushakov

13 April 2015 23	Ural	2 –0	Lokomotiv Moscow	Tyumen
17:00 YET (UTC+5)	Mykhalyk 6' (o.g.); Smolov 60'; Sapeta (yellow card) 81'; Belozyorov (yellow card) 88'	Summary	Mykhalyk (yellow card) 47'; Maicon (yellow card) 81'	Stadium: Geolog Stadium; Attendance: 6,000; Referee: Vladimir Moskalyov

18 April 2014 24	Rubin Kazan	2–1	Ural	Kazan
21:00 YET (UTC+5)	Ozdoev (yellow card) 25' (goal) 53'; Dyadyun 45+2'	Summary	Khozin (yellow card) 27'; Yerokhin 90+2'	Stadium: Central Stadium; Attendance: 3,147; Referee: Aleksey Eskov

24 April 2015 25	Mordovia Saransk	2–1	Ural	Saransk
21:00 YET (UTC+5)	Dudiev 50'; Shitov (yellow card) 59'; Rln.Mukhametshin 80'	Summary	Khozin (yellow card) 18'; Yerokhin 45'; Emelyanov (yellow card) 52'; Belozerov (yellow card) 58'; Markov (yellow card) 75'	Stadium: Start Stadium; Attendance: 4,388; Referee: Sergey Kostevich

4 May 2015 26	CSKA Moscow	3–1	Ural	Khimki
20:00 YET (UTC+5)	Natcho 17' (pen.); Wernbloom (yellow card) 61'; Milanov 62'; Dzagoev 63'	Summary	Novikov (yellow card) 7'; Acevedo (yellow card) 57'; Markov (yellow card) 77'; Fontanello (yellow card) 84'; Sapeta 86'	Stadium: Arena Khimki; Attendance: 5,000; Referee: Vitaly Meshkov

8 May 2015 27	Ural	1–1	Ufa	Tyumen
18:30 YET (UTC+5)	Emelyanov (yellow card) 45'; Khozin 46'; Novikov (yellow card) 79'	Summary	Golubov (yellow card) 27'; Paurević (yellow card) 30'; Alikin 32', (yellow card) 77'; Yurchenko (yellow card) 86'; Verkhotsov (yellow card) 90+3'	Stadium: Geolog Stadium; Attendance: 1,500

18 May 2015 28	Ural	2–1	Dynamo Moscow	Tyumen
19:00 YET (UTC+5)	Khozin (yellow card) 7'; Acevedo 42'; Emelyanov (yellow card) 80'; Smolov 86'	Summary	Zobnin 34'; Douglas (yellow card) 47'; Dzsudzsák (yellow card) 79'; Kuranyi (yellow card) 86'; Ionov (yellow card) 89'	Stadium: Geolog Stadium; Attendance: 8,000; Referee: Mikhail Vilkov

23 May 2015 29	Torpedo Moscow	3–1	Ural	Moscow
17:30 YET (UTC+5)	Katsalapov (yellow card) 8'; Vieira 30' (pen.), 63' (pen.); Stevanovic 57'	Summary	Fontanello 2' (yellow card) 20'; Zabolotnyi (red card) 26'; Smolov (yellow card) 66'	Stadium: Eduard Streltsov Stadium; Attendance: 0 Referee: Vladimir Moskalyov

30 May 2015 30	Terek Grozny	1–3	Ural	Grozny
15:30 YET (UTC+5)	Ivanov (yellow card) 18'; Yemelyanov 38' (o.g.); Rodolfo (yellow card) 48'; Lebedenko (yellow card) 61'; Utsiev (red card) 83'; Mbengue (yellow card) 89'	Summary	Gogniyev 40'; Khozin 45+1'; Sapeta (yellow card) 72'; Serchenkov (yellow card) 83' (goal) 88'	Stadium: Akhmat Arena; Attendance: 11,274; Referee: Vyacheslav Bezborodov

==== League table ====
Pos	Team	Pld	W	D	L	GF	GA	GD	Pts	Qualification or relegation
11	Amkar Perm	30	8	8	14	25	42	−17	32	
12	Ufa	30	7	10	13	26	39	−13	31	
13	Ural Sverdlovsk Oblast (O)	30	9	3	18	31	44	−13	30	Qualification for the Relegation play-offs
14	Rostov (O)	30	7	8	15	27	51	−24	29	Qualification for the Relegation play-offs
15	Torpedo Moscow (R)	30	6	11	13	28	45	−17	29	Relegation to Professional Football League

Source: Russian Premier League
Rules for classification: 1) points; 2) number of matches won; 3) head-to-head points; 4) head-to-head wins; 5) head-to-head goal difference; 6) head-to-head goals; 7) number of head-to-head away goals; 8) goal difference; 9) number of goals scored; 10) number of away goals scored
(O) Play-off winners; (R) Relegated

==== Relegation play-offs ====
3 June 2015 1st leg	Tom Tomsk	0–1	Ural	Tomsk
18:00 YET (UTC+5)	Nemov (yellow card) 18'; Bendz (yellow card) 75'	Summary	Markov (yellow card) 28'; Stavpets 83'	Stadium: Trud Stadium; Attendance: 5,519; Referee: Sergei Ivanov

7 June 2015 2nd leg	Ural	0–0 (1–0 agg.)	Tom Tomsk	Tyumen
17:00 YET (UTC+5)	Acevedo (yellow card) 33'; Stavpets (yellow card) 90+5'	Summary	Golyshev (yellow card) 33'; Bashkirov (yellow card) 62'	Stadium: Geolog Stadium; Referee: Vladislav Bezborodov

=== Russian Cup ===
24 September 2014 Round of 32	Krylia Sovetov	3–1	Ural	Samara
19:00 MSK (UTC+4)	Tkachuk 18', 59'; Jahović 41'; Chochiyev (yellow card) 66'	Summary	Fidler (yellow card) 26'; Khozin (yellow card) 65'; Acevedo (yellow card) 80'; Manucharyan 90+2'	Stadium: Metallurg Stadium; Attendance: 5,670; Referee: Roman Galimov

== Squad statistics ==
As of match played 7 June 2015

=== Appearances and goals ===
No.	Pos	Nat	Player	Total		Premier League		Play-off		Russian Cup	
No.	Pos	Nat	Player	Apps	Goals	Apps	Goals	Apps	Goals	Apps	Goals
2	DF	(Russia) RUS	Vladimir Khozin	31	3	29	3	1	0	1	0
3	FW	(Zambia) ZAM	Chisamba Lungu	27	1	19+5	1	2	0	1	0
7	DF	(Russia) RUS	Aleksandr Dantsev	27	0	20+5	0	1+1	0	0	0
8	MF	(Russia) RUS	Ivan Chudin	2	0	0	0	0+1	0	0+1	0
9	FW	(Russia) RUS	Spartak Gogniyev	17	2	3+11	2	2	0	0+1	0
10	FW	(Armenia) ARM	Edgar Manucharyan	19	3	16+2	2	0	0	1	1
12	DF	(Russia) RUS	Aleksandr Novikov	14	0	11+1	0	2	0	0	0
14	MF	(Russia) RUS	Vyacheslav Podberyozkin	20	0	15+5	0	0	0	0	0
21	MF	(Chile) CHI	Gerson Acevedo	27	3	15+9	3	2	0	1	0
24	DF	(Russia) RUS	Denis Fomin	4	0	0+2	0	1+1	0	0	0
25	FW	(Russia) RUS	Aleksandr Stavpets	19	1	8+9	0	0+2	1	0	0
28	GK	(Russia) RUS	Nikolay Zabolotnyi	30	0	29	0	0	0	1	0
29	DF	(Argentina) ARG	Pablo Fontanello	28	2	24+1	2	2	0	1	0
34	FW	(Russia) RUS	Denis Dorozhkin	11	0	0+10	0	0+1	0	0	0
35	GK	(Russia) RUS	Dmitri Arapov	4	0	1+1	0	2	0	0	0
41	MF	(Russia) RUS	Aleksandr Sapeta	19	1	13+5	1	1	0	0	0
50	DF	(Uzbekistan) UZB	Nikolay Markov	13	0	11	0	2	0	0	0
57	MF	(Russia) RUS	Artyom Fidler	20	0	17+1	0	1	0	1	0
63	DF	(Russia) RUS	Aleksandr Belozyorov	6	0	5+1	0	0	0	0	0
75	MF	(Russia) RUS	Sergei Serchenkov	2	1	0+2	1	0	0	0	0
89	MF	(Russia) RUS	Aleksandr Yerokhin	26	6	25	6	0	0	1	0
90	FW	(Russia) RUS	Fyodor Smolov	23	8	21+1	8	0	0	1	0
92	MF	(Russia) RUS	Roman Yemelyanov	17	0	13+1	0	2	0	0+1	0
99	MF	(Ukraine) UKR	Kostyantyn Yaroshenko	20	1	15+4	1	1	0	0	0
Players away from the club on loan:
18	FW	(Russia) RUS	Georgi Nurov	2	0	0+2	0	0	0	0	0
Players who appeared for Ural no longer at the club:
4	DF	(Austria) AUT	Markus Berger	4	0	3	0	0	0	1	0
6	DF	(Iceland) ISL	Sölvi Ottesen	15	0	15	0	0	0	0	0
11	MF	(Russia) RUS	Aleksandr Shchanitsyn	3	0	1+1	0	0	0	1	0
15	MF	(Russia) RUS	Arsen Oganesyan	5	0	1+4	0	0	0	0	0

=== Goal scorers ===
Place	Position	Nation	Number	Name	Russian Premier League	Russian Relegation Play-off	Russian Cup	Total
1	FW	(Russia)	90	Fyodor Smolov	8	0	0	8
2	MF	(Russia)	21	Aleksandr Yerokhin	6	0	0	6
3	MF	(Chile)	21	Gerson Acevedo	3	0	0	3
3	DF	(Russia)	2	Vladimir Khozin	3	0	0	3
3	FW	(Armenia)	10	Edgar Manucharyan	2	0	1	3
6	DF	(Argentina)	29	Pablo Fontanello	2	0	0	2
6	FW	(Russia)	9	Spartak Gogniyev	2	0	0	2
7	MF	(Ukraine)	99	Kostyantyn Yaroshenko	1	0	0	1
7	FW	(Zambia)	3	Chisamba Lungu	1	0	0	1
7	MF	(Russia)	41	Aleksandr Sapeta	1	0	0	1
7	MF	(Russia)	75	Sergei Serchenkov	1	0	0	1
7	FW	(Russia)	25	Aleksandr Stavpets	0	1	0	1
7				Own goal	1	0	0	1
				TOTALS	31	1	1	33

=== Disciplinary record ===
Number	Nation	Position	Name	Russian Premier League		Russian Relegation Play-off		Russian Cup		Total	
Number	Nation	Position	Name	Yellow card	Red card	Yellow card	Red card	Yellow card	Red card	Yellow card	Red card
2	(Russia)	DF	Vladimir Khozin	5	0	0	0	1	0	6	0
3	(Zambia)	FW	Chisamba Lungu	2	0	0	0	0	0	2	0
4	(Austria)	DF	Markus Berger	1	0	0	0	0	0	1	0
5	(Russia)	MF	Roman Yemelyanov	2	0	0	0	0	0	2	0
6	(Iceland)	DF	Sölvi Ottesen	1	0	0	0	0	0	1	0
7	(Russia)	DF	Aleksandr Dantsev	3	0	0	0	0	0	3	0
10	(Armenia)	FW	Edgar Manucharyan	1	0	0	0	0	0	1	0
12	(Russia)	DF	Aleksandr Novikov	2	0	0	0	0	0	2	0
14	(Russia)	MF	Vyacheslav Podberyozkin	2	0	0	0	0	0	2	0
15	(Russia)	MF	Arsen Oganesyan	1	0	0	0	0	0	1	0
21	(Chile)	MF	Gerson Acevedo	5	0	1	0	1	0	7	0
25	(Russia)	FW	Aleksandr Stavpets	2	0	1	0	0	0	3	0
28	(Russia)	GK	Nikolay Zabolotnyi	0	1	0	0	0	0	0	1
29	(Argentina)	DF	Pablo Fontanello	5	1	0	0	0	0	5	1
41	(Russia)	MF	Aleksandr Sapeta	4	0	0	0	0	0	4	0
50	(Uzbekistan)	DF	Nikolay Markov	2	0	1	0	0	0	3	0
57	(Russia)	MF	Artyom Fidler	6	0	0	0	1	0	7	0
63	(Russia)	DF	Aleksandr Belozyorov	2	0	0	0	0	0	2	0
75	(Russia)	MF	Sergey Serchenkov	1	0	0	0	0	0	1	0
89	(Russia)	MF	Aleksandr Yerokhin	5	0	0	0	0	0	5	0
90	(Russia)	FW	Fyodor Smolov	4	0	0	0	0	0	4	0
92	(Russia)	MF	Roman Yemelyanov	5	0	0	0	0	0	5	0
			TOTALS	61	2	3	0	3	0	67	2

== Notes ==
- YEKT time changed from UTC+6 to UTC+5 permanently on 26 October 2014.
