= 2012–13 FC Rostov season =

Rostov
2012–13 season
- Chairman: Oleg Lopatin
- Manager: Miodrag Božović
- Stadium: Olimp - 2, Rostov
- Russian Premier League: 13th
- Russian Cup: Semi-final vs CSKA Moscow
- Top goalscorer: League: Jan Holenda (6); All: Jan Holenda & Dmitri Kirichenko (6)
- Highest home attendance: 15,000 vs Zenit St. Petersburg; 12 May 2013
- Lowest home attendance: 3,500 vs Terek Grozny; 22 April 2013
- Average home league attendance: 10,109; 12 December 2012
Home colours	Away colours

The 2012–13 Rostov season was the fourth straight season that the club played in the Russian Premier League, the highest tier of football in Russia after they won their relegation playoff tie against Shinnik Yaroslavl. They have also played in the 2012–13 Russian Cup.

== Squad ==
As of 10 March 2014

Note: Flags indicate national team as defined under FIFA eligibility rules; some limited exceptions apply. Players may hold more than one non-FIFA nationality.

No.	Pos.	Nation	Player
1	GK	CRO	Stipe Pletikosa (captain)
2	MF	BLR	Timofei Kalachev
3	DF	SVK	Kornel Saláta
4	DF	NGR	Isaac Okoronkwo
5	DF	RUS	Vitali Dyakov
8	MF	RUS	Dmitri Malyaka
10	FW	RUS	Dmitri Kirichenko
11	FW	CZE	Jan Holenda
14	FW	RUS	Dmitry Poloz
16	DF	EST	Dmitri Kruglov
17	MF	RUS	Aleksandr Sheshukov
18	DF	RUS	Vladimir Kisenkov
22	DF	RUS	Andrei Ivanov
23	MF	RUS	Igor Kireyev

No.	Pos.	Nation	Player
24	FW	FRA	Florent Sinama Pongolle
25	GK	RUS	Nikolai Zabolotny
27	MF	GAB	Guélor Kanga
30	DF	RUS	Maksim Belyayev (on loan from Lokomotiv Moscow)
33	DF	RUS	Inal Getigezhev
34	DF	RUS	Timofei Margasov
55	DF	RSA	Siyanda Xulu
70	FW	AZE	Magomed Kurbanov
77	FW	SRB	Danko Lazovic (on loan from Zenit)
81	MF	ROU	Răzvan Cociș
84	MF	MDA	Alexandru Gațcan
87	FW	USA	Yevgeni Starikov
88	FW	LTU	Edgaras Česnauskis
99	FW	SRB	Nemanja Nikolić

The following players are listed on the official club's website as reserves and are registered with the Premier League. They are eligible to play for the main squad.

=== Reserve squad ===
Note: Flags indicate national team as defined under FIFA eligibility rules; some limited exceptions apply. Players may hold more than one non-FIFA nationality.

No.	Pos.	Nation	Player
6	MF	RUS	Nikita Vasilyev
7	MF	RUS	Khoren Bayramyan
29	DF	RUS	Andrei Vasilyev
38	FW	RUS	Tamerlan Bidzhiyev
39	DF	RUS	Andrei Demchenko
40	FW	RUS	Sayputtin Davydov
41	GK	RUS	Artyom Orsayev
42	MF	RUS	Artyom Kulishev
43	GK	RUS	Konstantin Bosikov
44	MF	RUS	Nikita Gigolayev
45	FW	RUS	Anton Lazutkin
46	MF	RUS	Artyom Linchenko
48	FW	RUS	Daniil Ostapenko

No.	Pos.	Nation	Player
49	FW	RUS	Gennadi Kozlov
51	DF	RUS	Vladimir Shamara
52	DF	RUS	Aleksandr Tundenkov
53	DF	RUS	Anton Smirnov
54	MF	RUS	Sergei Mikhailov
56	MF	RUS	Vitali Ivanov
57	MF	RUS	Veniamin Mednikov
58	MF	RUS	Dmitri Kartashov
59	MF	RUS	Artyom Eskov
60	FW	RUS	Aleksandr Stepanov
62	GK	RUS	Vladislav Suslov
66	DF	RUS	Igor Gubanov
68	DF	RUS	Andrei Zotov

== Transfers ==
=== Summer ===
In: Note: Flags indicate national team as defined under FIFA eligibility rules; some limited exceptions apply. Players may hold more than one non-FIFA nationality.

No.	Pos.	Nation	Player
8	MF	RUS	Dmitri Malyaka (from (Russia) Tom Tomsk)
9	FW	RUS	Roman Adamov (from (Russia) Rubin Kazan, previously on loan)
11	FW	CZE	Jan Holenda (from (Russia) Anzhi Makhachkala)
15	DF	CMR	Benoît Angbwa (from (Russia) Anzhi Makhachkala)
17	MF	RUS	Aleksandr Sheshukov (from (Russia) Spartak Moscow)
18	DF	RUS	Vladimir Kisenkov (on loan from (Russia) Dynamo Moscow)
20	MF	RUS	Sergey Belousov (from (Russia) Torpedo Moscow)
21	MF	ENG	David Bentley (on loan from (England) Tottenham Hotspur)
22	DF	RUS	Andrei Ivanov (on loan from (Russia) Lokomotiv Moscow, previously on loan to (Russia) Tom Tomsk)
23	MF	RUS	Igor Kireyev (from (Russia) Spartak Moscow)
24	FW	FRA	Florent Sinama Pongolle (from (Portugal) Sporting, previously on loan to (France) Saint-Étienne)
25	GK	RUS	Nikolai Zabolotny (on loan from (Russia) Spartak Moscow)
33	DF	RUS	Inal Getigezhev (from (Russia) Volga Nizhny Novgorod)
43	GK	RUS	Konstantin Bosikov
55	DF	RSA	Siyanda Xulu (from (South Africa) Mamelodi Sundowns)
87	FW	USA	Eugene Starikov (on loan from (Russia) Zenit Saint Petersburg)

Out: Note: Flags indicate national team as defined under FIFA eligibility rules; some limited exceptions apply. Players may hold more than one non-FIFA nationality.

No.	Pos.	Nation	Player
6	MF	ARG	Oscar Ahumada (to (Argentina) All Boys)
7	MF	BRA	Élson
12	GK	RUS	Ilya Madilov
15	DF	SRB	Ivan Živanović
16	DF	EST	Dmitri Kruglov (to (Estonia) Levadia Tallinn)
18	FW	CZE	Michal Papadopulos (to (Poland) Zagłębie Lubin)
19	FW	ARG	Héctor Bracamonte (to (Argentina) Rosario Central)
22	GK	SRB	Dejan Radić (Rostov Scout)
24	DF	RUS	Denis Kolodin (end of loan from (Russia) Dynamo Moscow)
28	MF	RUS	Igor Smolnikov (loan return to (Russia) Lokomotiv Moscow)
72	DF	RUS	Valentin Filatov (to (Russia) Khimki)
92	MF	RUS	Roman Yemelyanov (to (Ukraine) Illichivets Mariupol on loan from (Ukraine) Shakhtar Donetsk)
97	GK	RUS	Sergei Pesyakov (end of loan from (Russia) Spartak Moscow)

=== Winter ===
In: Note: Flags indicate national team as defined under FIFA eligibility rules; some limited exceptions apply. Players may hold more than one non-FIFA nationality.

No.	Pos.	Nation	Player
27	MF	GAB	Guélor Kanga (from (Gabon) CF Mounana)
30	DF	RUS	Maksim Belyayev (on loan from (Russia) Lokomotiv Moscow)
34	DF	RUS	Timofei Margasov (from (Russia) Yenisey Krasnoyarsk)
63	MF	RUS	Maksim Lepskiy (from (Russia) Sokol Saratov)
77	FW	SRB	Danko Lazović (on loan from (Russia) Zenit Saint Petersburg)

Out: Note: Flags indicate national team as defined under FIFA eligibility rules; some limited exceptions apply. Players may hold more than one non-FIFA nationality.

No.	Pos.	Nation	Player
15	DF	CMR	Benoît Angbwa (to (Russia) Krylia Sovetov)
19	MF	BIH	Dragan Blatnjak (to (Croatia) NK Osijek)
20	MF	RUS	Sergey Belousov (on loan to (Russia) Shinnik Yaroslavl)
21	MF	ENG	David Bentley (end of loan from (England) Tottenham Hotspur)

== Competitions ==
=== Russian Premier League ===
==== Results ====
21 July 2012 1	CSKA Moscow	1–0	Rostov	Moscow
13:30 MSK (UTC+4)	Doumbia 55'	Summary		Stadium: Luzhniki Stadium; Attendance: 12,000; Referee: Aleksandr Egorov

28 July 2012 2	Rostov	2–2	Anzhi Makhachkala	Rostov, Rostov Oblast
20:00 MSK (UTC+4)	Kirichenko 75' (pen.); Holenda 88'	Summary	Jucilei (yellow card) 18' (yellow-red card) 30'; Tagirbekov 49', 90+5'	Stadium: Olimp - 2 Attendance: 13,200; Referee: Aleksey Eskov

3 August 2012 3	Mordovia Saransk	3–0	Rostov	Saransk
19:00 MSK (UTC+4)	Osipov 10'; Dyakov 51'; Mukhametshin 90+3'	Summary		Stadium: Start Stadium; Attendance: 8,500; Referee: Evgeny Turbin

12 August 2012 4	Rostov	1–2	Krylia Sovetov	Rostov, Rostov Oblast
21:00 MSK (UTC+4)	Saláta 54'	Summary	Caballero 19'; Verkhovtsov 60'	Stadium: Olimp - 2 Attendance: 6,800; Referee: Vitali Meshkov

18 August 2012 5	Krasnodar	0–0	Rostov	Krasnodar, Krasnodar Krai
20:00 MSK (UTC+4)		Summary		Stadium: Kuban Stadium; Attendance: 6,200; Referee: Timur Arslanbekov

25 August 2012 6	Rostov	3–1	Alania Vladikavkaz	Rostov, Rostov Oblast
20:45 MSK (UTC+4)	Holenda 42', 44', 65'; Česnauskis (yellow card) 37' (yellow-red card) 49'	Summary	Neco 1'	Stadium: Olimp - 2 Attendance: 6,200; Referee: Sergey Kuznetsov

1 September 2012 7	Volga Nizhny Novgorod	1–1	Rostov	Nizhny Novgorod, Nizhny Novgorod Oblast
16:30 MSK (UTC+4)	Buivolov (red card) 29'; Sapogov 87'	Summary	Blatnjak 9'	Stadium: Lokomotiv Stadium; Attendance: 2,000; Referee: Vasiliy Kazartsev

15 September 2012 8	Rostov	1–0	Dynamo Moscow	Rostov, Rostov Oblast
20:00 MSK (UTC+4)	Holenda 62'	Summary		Stadium: Olimp - 2 Attendance: 14,000; Referee: Vladislav Bezborodov

23 September 2012 9	Spartak Moscow	3–1	Rostov	Moscow
15:00 MSK (UTC+4)	Emenike 27', 71'; Ari 64'	Summary	Pongolle 88'	Stadium: Luzhniki Stadium; Attendance: 12,558; Referee: Sergey Lapochkin

30 September 2012 10	Rostov	0–4	Rubin Kazan	Rostov-on-Don, Rostov Oblast
18:30 MSK (UTC+4)	Saláta (red card) 52'	Summary	Rondón 18', 31'; Bocchetti 81'; Dyadyun 90+4'	Stadium: Olimp – 2 Attendance: 11,740; Referee: Eduard Malyi

5 October 2012 11	Terek Grozny	2–1	Rostov	Grozny, Chechnya
19:00 MSK (UTC+4)	Komorowski 52'; Aílton 83'	Summary	Kalachev 85'	Stadium: Sultan Bilimkhanov Stadium; Attendance: 24,700; Referee: Alexey Nikolaev

21 October 2012 12	Rostov	0–0	Lokomotiv Moscow	Rostov-on-Don, Rostov Oblast
20:00 MSK (UTC+4)		Summary		Stadium: Olimp – 2 Attendance: 13,000; Referee: Sergey Kuznetsov

26 October 2012 13	Kuban Krasnodar	1–0	Rostov	Krasnodar, Krasnodar Krai
20:30 MSK (UTC+4)	Popov 78'	Summary		Stadium: Kuban Stadium; Attendance: 14,890; Referee: Igor Nizovtsev

2 November 2012 14	Zenit St. Petersburg	2–1	Rostov	Saint Petersburg
19:00 MSK (UTC+4)	Bystrov 51'; Shirokov 90+3'	Summary	Holenda 79'	Stadium: Petrovsky Stadium; Attendance: 18,600; Referee: Maxim Layushkin

9 November 2012 15	Rostov	3–0	Amkar Perm	Rostov, Rostov Oblast
19:00 MSK (UTC+4)	Cociș 27'; Saláta 69'; Kirichenko 74' (pen.)	Summary		Stadium: Olimp - 2 Attendance: 6,000; Referee: Vladislav Bezborodov

18 November 2012 16	Anzhi Makhachkala	0–0	Rostov	Makhachkala, Dagestan
18:30 MSK (UTC+4)		Summary		Stadium: Dynamo Stadium; Attendance: 14,000; Referee: Timur Arslanbekov

23 November 2012 17	Rostov	2–0	Mordovia Saransk	Rostov, Rostov Oblast
19:00 MSK (UTC+4)	Dyakov 45' (pen.); Kirichenko 81'	Summary	Kontsedalov (red card) 75'	Stadium: Olimp - 2 Attendance: 5,500; Referee: Sergey Karasev

1 December 2012 18	Krylia Sovetov	0–2	Rostov	Samara, Samara Oblast
16:00 MSK (UTC+4)	Tsallagov (red card) 63'	Summary	Blatnjak 6'; Česnauskis 74'	Stadium: Metallurg Stadium; Attendance: 7,600; Referee: Mikhail Vilkov

7 December 2012 19	Rostov	2–3	Krasnodar	Rostov, Rostov Oblast
16:30 MSK (UTC+4)	Poloz 26'; Kirichenko 56'	Summary	Wánderson 24', 50'; Shipitsin 38'	Stadium: Olimp - 2 Attendance: 5,700; Referee: Sergey Kuznetsov

9 March 2013 20	Alania Vladikavkaz	0–0	Rostov	Vladikavkaz
18:30 MSK (UTC+4)		Summary		Stadium: Republican Spartak Stadium; Attendance: 15,200; Referee: Sergey Lapochkin

15 March 2013 21	Rostov	1–2	Volga Nizhny Novgorod	Rostov, Rostov Oblast
19:00 MSK (UTC+4)	Kirichenko 80'	Summary	Sarkisov 31', 63'	Stadium: Olimp - 2 Attendance: 10,000; Referee: Vladislav Bezborodov

30 March 2013 22	Dynamo Moscow	1–0	Rostov	Moscow
18:30 MSK (UTC+4)	Kurányi 27'	Summary		Stadium: Arena Khimki; Attendance: 6,067; Referee: Aleksey Eskov

6 April 2013 23	Rostov	1–0	Spartak Moscow	Rostov, Rostov Oblast
16:30 MSK (UTC+4)	Lazović 50' (pen.)	Summary		Stadium: Olimp - 2 Attendance: 15,830; Referee: Sergey Lapochkin

14 April 2013 24	Rubin Kazan	1–1	Rostov	Kazan, Tatarstan
19:00 MSK (UTC+4)	Karadeniz 78'	Summary	Poloz 64'	Stadium: Tsentralnyi Stadion; Attendance: 8,200; Referee: Aleksei Matyunin

22 April 2013 25	Rostov	0–3	Terek Grozny	Rostov-on-Don, Rostov Oblast
19:00 MSK (UTC+4)		Summary	Aílton 10'; Holenda 14' (o.g.); Adílson 49'	Stadium: Olimp – 2 Attendance: 3,500; Referee: Aleksandr Egorov

27 April 2013 26	Lokomotiv Moscow	3–1	Rostov	Moscow
18:30 MSK (UTC+4)	N'Doye 20'; Caicedo 83'; Torbinski 89'	Summary	Kalachev 29'	Stadium: Lokomotiv Stadium; Attendance: 9,137; Referee: Maxim Layushkin

4 May 2013 27	Rostov	0–2	Kuban Krasnodar	Rostov-on-Don, Rostov Oblast
15:45 MSK (UTC+4)		Summary	Popov 48', 56'	Stadium: Olimp – 2 Attendance: 7,200; Referee: Sergey Lapochkin

12 May 2013 28	Rostov	1–1	Zenit St. Petersburg	Rostov-on-Don, Rostov Oblast
18:30 MSK (UTC+4)	Dyakov 80' (pen.); Kalachev (yellow card) 90' (yellow-red card) 90+5'	Summary	Witsel 6'	Stadium: Olimp – 2 Attendance: 15,000; Referee: Aleksey Eskov

17 May 2013 29	Amkar Perm	3–2	Rostov	Perm, Perm Krai
17:00 MSK (UTC+4)	Kolomeytsev 17'; Jakubko 23'; Georgiev 55' (pen.)	Summary	Starikov 64', 90+3'	Stadium: Zvezda Stadium; Attendance: 16,100; Referee: Alexey Nikolaev

26 May 2013 30	Rostov	3–0	CSKA Moscow	Rostov, Rostov Oblast
13:30 MSK (UTC+4)	Poloz 18'; Kanga 44'; Kalachev 56'	Summary		Stadium: Olimp - 2 Attendance: 14,500; Referee: Sergey Lapochkin

==== Table ====
Pos	Team	Pld	W	D	L	GF	GA	GD	Pts	Qualification or relegation
11	Amkar Perm	30	7	8	15	34	51	−17	29 (Note: Amkar Perm ahead of Volga Nizhny Novgorod and Rostov on head-to-head points; Amkar Perm: 7 pts, Volga Nizhny Novgorod: 5 pts, Rostov: 4 pts.)	
12	Volga Nizhny Novgorod	30	7	8	15	28	46	−18	29	
13	Rostov (O)	30	7	8	15	30	41	−11	29	Qualification for the Relegation play-offs
14	Krylia Sovetov Samara (O)	30	7	7	16	31	52	−21	28	Qualification for the Relegation play-offs
15	Mordovia Saransk (R)	30	5	5	20	30	57	−27	20	Relegation to Football National League

Source: Russian Premier League
Rules for classification: 1) points; 2) number of wins; 3) head-to-head points; 4) number of head-to-head wins; 5) head-to-head goal difference; 6) number of head-to-head goals scored; 7) number of head-to-head away goals scored; 8) goal difference; 9) number of goals scored; 10) number of away goals scored; 11) position in the 2011–12 season (only used until all the regularly scheduled games have been played); 11) extra play-off game or tournament between the teams in question.
(O) Play-off winners; (R) Relegated

=== Relegation play-offs ===
29 May 2013 1st leg	Rostov	2–0	SKA-Energiya Khabarovsk	Rostov, Rostov Oblast
20:30 MSK (UTC+4)	Guélor 43'; Cociș 90'	Summary		Stadium: Olimp - 2 Attendance: 8,500; Referee: Sergey Karasev

3 June 2013 2nd leg	SKA-Energiya Khabarovsk	0–1 (0–3 agg.)	Rostov	Khabarovsk
12:00 MSK (UTC+4)		Summary	Lazovic 66'; Kisenkov (red card) 90'	Stadium: Lenin Stadium; Attendance: 12,200; Referee: Maxim Layushkin

=== Russian Cup ===
26 September 2012 Round of 32	Astrakhan	1 – 3	Rostov	Astrakhan
16:00 MSK (UTC+4)	Sergei Sinyayev 42' (pen.)	Summary	Cociș 22'; Kirichenko 63' (pen.); Česnauskis 73'	Stadium: Astrakhan Stadium; Attendance: 2,750; Referee: Vladimir Rogulev

30 October 2012 Round of 16	Rostov	0–0 (a.e.t.) (3−2 p)	Spartak Moscow	Rostov-on-Don
20:00 MSK (UTC+4)		Summary		Stadium: Olimp – 2 Attendance: 10,100; Referee: Vasiliy Kazartsev
	Penalties
	Kirichenko (penalty scored); Saláta (penalty missed); Blatnjak (penalty missed); Dyakov (penalty scored); Kalachev (penalty scored)		Jurado (penalty missed); K. Kombarov (penalty missed); Ananidze (penalty scored); Insaurralde (penalty missed); Ari (penalty scored)

18 April 2013 Quarter-finals	Rostov	0–0 (a.e.t.) (4−3 p)	Terek Grozny	Rostov-on-Don
18:00 MSK (UTC+4)		Summary	Utsiyev (yellow card) 39' (yellow-red card) 117'	Stadium: Olimp - 2 Attendance: 9,200; Referee: Alexei Eskov
	Penalties
	Kirichenko (penalty scored); Poloz (penalty scored); Sheshukov (penalty scored); Dyakov (penalty scored)		Aílton (penalty scored); Rybus (penalty scored); Lebedenko (penalty missed); Komorowski (penalty scored); Ivanov (penalty missed)

7 May 2013 Semi-final	Rostov	0–2 (a.e.t.)	CSKA Moscow	Rostov-on-Don
18:00 MSK (UTC+4)	Lazovic (red card) 81'	Summary	Ignashevich (red card) 81'; Doumbia 105'; Musa 120+1'	Stadium: Olimp – 2 Attendance: 14,500; Referee: Vladislav Bezborodov

== Squad statistics ==
As of match played 3 June 2013

=== Appearances and goals ===
No.	Pos	Nat	Player	Total		Premier League		Relegation Play-off		Russian Cup	
No.	Pos	Nat	Player	Apps	Goals	Apps	Goals	Apps	Goals	Apps	Goals
1	GK	(Croatia) CRO	Stipe Pletikosa	35	0	30	0	2	0	3	0
2	MF	(Belarus) BLR	Timofei Kalachev	25	3	20+1	3	1	0	2+1	0
3	DF	(Slovakia) SVK	Kornel Saláta	20	2	18	2	0	0	2	0
4	DF	(Nigeria) NGR	Isaac Okoronkwo	7	0	4+1	0	2	0	0	0
5	DF	(Russia) RUS	Vitali Dyakov	29	2	24+1	2	1	0	3	0
8	MF	(Russia) RUS	Dmitri Malyaka	3	0	0+2	0	0	0	1	0
10	FW	(Russia) RUS	Dmitri Kirichenko	27	6	2+20	5	0+1	0	1+3	1
11	FW	(Czech Republic) CZE	Jan Holenda	32	6	14+14	6	0+2	0	1+1	0
14	FW	(Russia) RUS	Dmitry Poloz	22	3	8+9	3	2	0	1+2	0
17	MF	(Russia) RUS	Aleksandr Sheshukov	32	0	27	0	2	0	2+1	0
18	DF	(Russia) RUS	Vladimir Kisenkov	16	0	12+1	0	1	0	1+1	0
22	DF	(Russia) RUS	Andrei Ivanov	4	0	1+2	0	0	0	1	0
24	FW	(France) FRA	Florent Sinama Pongolle	11	1	10	1	0	0	1	0
25	GK	(Russia) RUS	Nikolai Zabolotny	2	0	0+1	0	0	0	1	0
27	MF	(Gabon) GAB	Guélor Kanga	13	2	8+2	1	1	1	2	0
30	DF	(Russia) RUS	Maksim Belyayev	7	0	5	0	0	0	2	0
33	MF	(Russia) RUS	Inal Getigezhev	32	0	28	0	2	0	2	0
34	DF	(Russia) RUS	Timofei Margasov	11	0	7	0	1+1	0	2	0
55	DF	(South Africa) RSA	Siyanda Xulu	13	0	9+2	0	1	0	1	0
63	MF	(Russia) RUS	Maksim Lepskiy	2	0	0+2	0	0	0	0	0
70	FW	(Russia) RUS	Magomed Kurbanov	1	0	0+1	0	0	0	0	0
77	FW	(Serbia) SRB	Danko Lazovic	13	2	8+1	1	2	1	2	0
81	MF	(Romania) ROU	Răzvan Cociș	19	3	13+2	1	1+1	1	2	1
84	MF	(Moldova) MDA	Alexandru Gațcan	31	0	26	0	2	0	3	0
87	FW	(United States) USA	Yevgeni Starikov	9	2	3+5	2	0+1	0	0	0
88	MF	(Lithuania) LTU	Edgaras Česnauskis	31	2	20+6	1	1	0	3+1	1
Players left Rostov during the season:
9	FW	(Russia) RUS	Roman Adamov	6	0	5+1	0	0	0	0	0
15	DF	(Cameroon) CMR	Benoît Angbwa	16	0	14	0	0	0	2	0
19	MF	(Bosnia and Herzegovina) BIH	Dragan Blatnjak	17	2	7+8	2	0	0	1+1	0
20	MF	(Russia) RUS	Sergey Belousov	4	0	0+3	0	0	0	1	0
21	MF	(England) ENG	David Bentley	8	0	7	0	0	0	1	0

=== Goal scorers ===
Place	Position	Nation	Number	Name	Premier League	Relegation play-off	Russian Cup	Total
1	FW	(Czech Republic)	11	Jan Holenda	6	0	0	6
1	FW	(Russia)	10	Dmitri Kirichenko	5	0	1	6
2	FW	(Russia)	14	Dmitry Poloz	3	0	0	3
2	MF	(Belarus)	2	Timofei Kalachev	3	0	0	3
2	MF	(Romania)	81	Răzvan Cociș	1	1	1	3
6	DF	(Slovakia)	3	Kornel Saláta	2	0	0	2
6	MF	(Bosnia and Herzegovina)	19	Dragan Blatnjak	2	0	0	2
6	DF	(Russia)	5	Vitali Dyakov	2	0	0	2
6	FW	(United States)	87	Yevgeni Starikov	2	0	0	2
6	MF	(Gabon)	27	Guélor Kanga	1	1	0	2
6	FW	(Serbia)	77	Danko Lazovic	1	1	0	2
6	MF	(Lithuania)	88	Edgaras Česnauskis	1	0	1	2
12	FW	(France)	24	Florent Sinama Pongolle	1	0	0	1
				TOTALS	30	3	3	36

=== Clean sheets ===
Place	Position	Nation	Number	Name	Premier League	Relegation play-off	Russian Cup	Total
1	GK	(Croatia)	1	Stipe Pletikosa	10	2	2	14
TOTALS					10	2	2	14

=== Disciplinary record ===
Number	Nation	Position	Name	Premier League		Relegation Play-off		Russian Cup		Total	
Number	Nation	Position	Name	Yellow card	Red card	Yellow card	Red card	Yellow card	Red card	Yellow card	Red card
1	(Croatia)	GK	Stipe Pletikosa	3	0	0	0	0	0	3	0
2	(Belarus)	MF	Timofei Kalachev	10	1	0	0	2	0	12	1
3	(Slovakia)	DF	Kornel Saláta	5	1	0	0	0	0	5	1
4	(Nigeria)	DF	Isaac Okoronkwo	1	0	0	0	0	0	1	0
5	(Russia)	DF	Vitali Dyakov	2	0	1	0	1	0	4	0
8	(Russia)	MF	Dmitri Malyaka	1	0	0	0	0	0	1	0
10	(Russia)	FW	Dmitri Kirichenko	4	0	0	0	0	0	4	0
11	(Czech Republic)	FW	Jan Holenda	2	0	0	0	1	0	3	0
14	(Russia)	FW	Dmitry Poloz	1	0	0	0	0	0	1	0
17	(Russia)	MF	Aleksandr Sheshukov	6	0	0	0	0	0	6	0
18	(Russia)	DF	Vladimir Kisenkov	8	0	0	1	1	0	9	1
22	(Russia)	DF	Andrei Ivanov	2	0	0	0	0	0	2	0
24	(France)	FW	Florent Sinama Pongolle	0	0	0	0	1	0	1	0
27	(Gabon)	MF	Guélor Kanga	3	0	1	0	1	0	5	0
33	(Russia)	DF	Inal Getigezhev	3	0	0	0	0	0	3	0
55	(South Africa)	DF	Siyanda Xulu	1	0	0	0	0	0	1	0
63	(Russia)	MF	Maksim Lepskiy	1	0	0	0	0	0	1	0
77	(Serbia)	FW	Danko Lazovic	2	0	0	0	0	1	2	1
81	(Romania)	MF	Răzvan Cociș	2	0	0	0	0	0	2	0
84	(Moldova)	MF	Alexandru Gațcan	10	0	0	0	0	0	10	0
88	(Lithuania)	MF	Edgaras Česnauskis	6	1	0	1	0	0	7	1
Players away on loan:
Players who left Rostov during the season:
9	(Russia)	FW	Roman Adamov	1	0	0	0	0	0	1	0
15	(Cameroon)	DF	Benoît Angbwa	1	0	0	0	0	0	1	0
19	(Bosnia and Herzegovina)	MF	Dragan Blatnjak	2	0	0	0	0	0	2	0
21	(England)	MF	David Bentley	1	0	0	0	0	0	1	0
			TOTALS	78	3	2	1	8	1	88	5
