= Glavnaya Stsena =

- Russian: Главная Сцена
- Presented by: Grigoryi Leps (1); Garik Mahtirosyan (1); Nargis Zakirova (2); Marina Kravets (2); Ernest Mackevičius (2)
- Judges: Walter Afanasieff (1); Zhana Rozhdestvenskaya (1); Yuri Antonov (1); Sergey Chigrakov (1); Valery Leontiev (2); Diana Arbenina (2); Nikolai Noskov (2); Elena Vaenga (2)
- Country of origin: Russia
- Original language: Russian
- No. of seasons: 2

Production
- Production location: Moscow

Original release
- Network: Russia-1
- Release: 30 January 2015 – 2 January 2016

Related
- Faktor A (Russia); Golos (Russia); Sekret Uspekha (Russia); The X Factor United Kingdom (UK); The X-Factor Ukraine (Ukraine)

Glavnaya Stsena (Russian: Главная сцена 'Main Stage'), is the third Russian version of the international vocal talent show X Factor. All participants pass through the public auditions. The top prize is a personal tour across Russia.

Main judge Arthur Gasparyan also announced that contestants would have a chance of taking part in the Eurovision selection process, to represent Russia.

== Format ==
The project has 4 judges for giving their thoughts on the performance, and 5 judges to take care of a participants chosen, however if necessary, they may also give their thoughts on a participant (Walter Afanasieff is in both sides). When contestants pass the auditions, they go to the judge-producer stage, where famous music personalities in Russia take over. Judges include famous figures notably Walter Afanasieff. Once a week the team gives a concert, with one participants who judges think is the weakest leave the project. Every producer takes to the final three chosen participants, from where the best reach the super final.

In initial stages, judges vote "yes" or "no" with three "no"s resulting in the participant leaving the project. But a producer may say his own word if he wishes to use the privilege saving a participant from being eliminated. The remaining eligible contestants pass to the next stage. If opinion is split half-half, then the decision goes to the judges-producers.

In later stages, each judge-producer chooses the participants in five musical genres

- Walter Afanasieff & Elena Kiper — vocal style soul.
- Victor Drobish & Stas Piekha — pop-rock and rock.
- Igor Matvienko & Antony Belyaev — funk, ethnic & jazz-fusion.
- Konstantin Meladze & Evgeny Orlov — neo-classic.
- Maxim Fadeev & Oleg Nekrasov — Indigo.

For the preparation of the participants for the performances, producers may have a chance to invite the vocal masters, dance masters, stylists and other specialists for help.

== Summary ==
=== Stages ===
- 1 stage: Auditions
- 2 stage: Public Auditions (auditions in studio, and this is the decision whether the participant will perform on the Main Scene)
- 3 stage: Producer Auditions (judge choice)
- 4 stage: Concert Performance (the work of producer with his team)
- 5 stage: Super-Final (Voting of the public)

=== Hosts ===
Season	**1st Host**		**2nd Host**	
1	Grigory Leps	Popular Russian singer	Garik Martirosyan	Popular humourist and singer
2	Nargis Zakirova	Finalist of The Voice Russia, and popular Russian singer	Ernest Matskyavichus	The host of Vesti

=== Producers and Contestants ===
— The winning producer. The Super-Final participants' names are in bold.

Season	Walter Afanasieff	Victor Drobish	Igor Matvienko	Konstantin Meladze	Maxim Fadeev
1	**Ksenia Dezhneva**; Julia Boyiko; Jukebox Trio	**Alexander Ivanov**; Ksenia Pavroz group KERSY	**«My Michelle»** Duet Oleg&Tais; Boysband	**Sardor Milano**; George Melikeshvili; Nikolai Timohin	**Arsen Mukendi**; Irina Oifer; Igor Pidjakov

== Project's history ==
It is not the first time Russian television tries to adopt the British version of The X Factor. In 2005—2007, Russia had its own version called Sekret Uspekha which had 2 seasons, however it was not as popular or highly rated as compared to Fabrika Zvyozd, which resulted in the project being canceled after 2 seasons in 2007.

In 2011-2013, a new Russian version of X Factor was launched named Faktor A. It was named in reference to the star judge on the show the famous Russian singer Alla Pugacheva). All versions of X Factor in Russia were broadcast on Russia-1.

Glavnaya Stsena is the third Russian adaptation of The X Factor. However, unlike the previous adaptations, FremantleMedia's involvement in the production was low due to sanctions against Russia during the Russo-Ukrainian War.

In each episode of the show, the Glavnaya Stsena participants perform, with the judges deciding who would stay. In the first season, 10,000 candidates initial presented themselves, with 75 singers, groups and bands picked for the television show. The main prize for the winner is a pan-Russia tour.

== Season 1 ==
The casting began in Moscow in December, 2014. Ten thousand participants applied for audition, but only 150 people passed to the public auditions. The best 75 participants performed for the public in the main Moscow's Kremlin main stage, attended by the Russian public and a number of famous artists including the participants of The Voice Russia and famous producers.

The first television broadcast was on 30 January 2015 on the station Russia-1. The judges were Walter Afanasieff, Zhana Rozhdestvenskaya, Yuri Antonov and Sergey Chigrakov.

The judgers-producers of the project were: Walter Afanasieff, Victor Drobish, Igor Matvienko, Konstantin Meladze and Maxim Fadeev.

The Super-Final was on 17 April 2015 in the same Moscow's Kremlin Main Stage. Based on public votes, the winner was Sardor Milano from Uzbekistan.

== Season 2 ==
In its second season, the project has undergone serious changes, becoming a music academy that seeks talent for the national stage and accepts only performers who sing in the Russian language.

A total of 96 contestants were admitted to the qualifying rounds.

Casting for season 2 began in July 2015. The judges were Valery Leontiev, Elena Vaenga, Diana Arbenina, Nikolai Noskov and Vladimir Presnyakov. The new hosts are Nargiz Zakirova (first four episodes), Marina Kravets and Ernest Mackevičius. The first episode was on 13 September 2015.

== See also ==
- Sekret Uspekha
- Faktor A
- The Voice Russia
