= Nurov =

Nurov (Russian: Нуров) is a Russian masculine surname originating from the Turkic word nur meaning ray; its feminine counterpart is Nurova. The surname may refer to

- Georgi Nurov (born 1992), Russian football forward
- Magomedgadzhi Nurov (born 1993), Macedonian freestyle wrestler
