= Alexey Vorobyov =

Russian singer and actor (born 1988)

Alexey Vorobyov Алексей Воробьёв
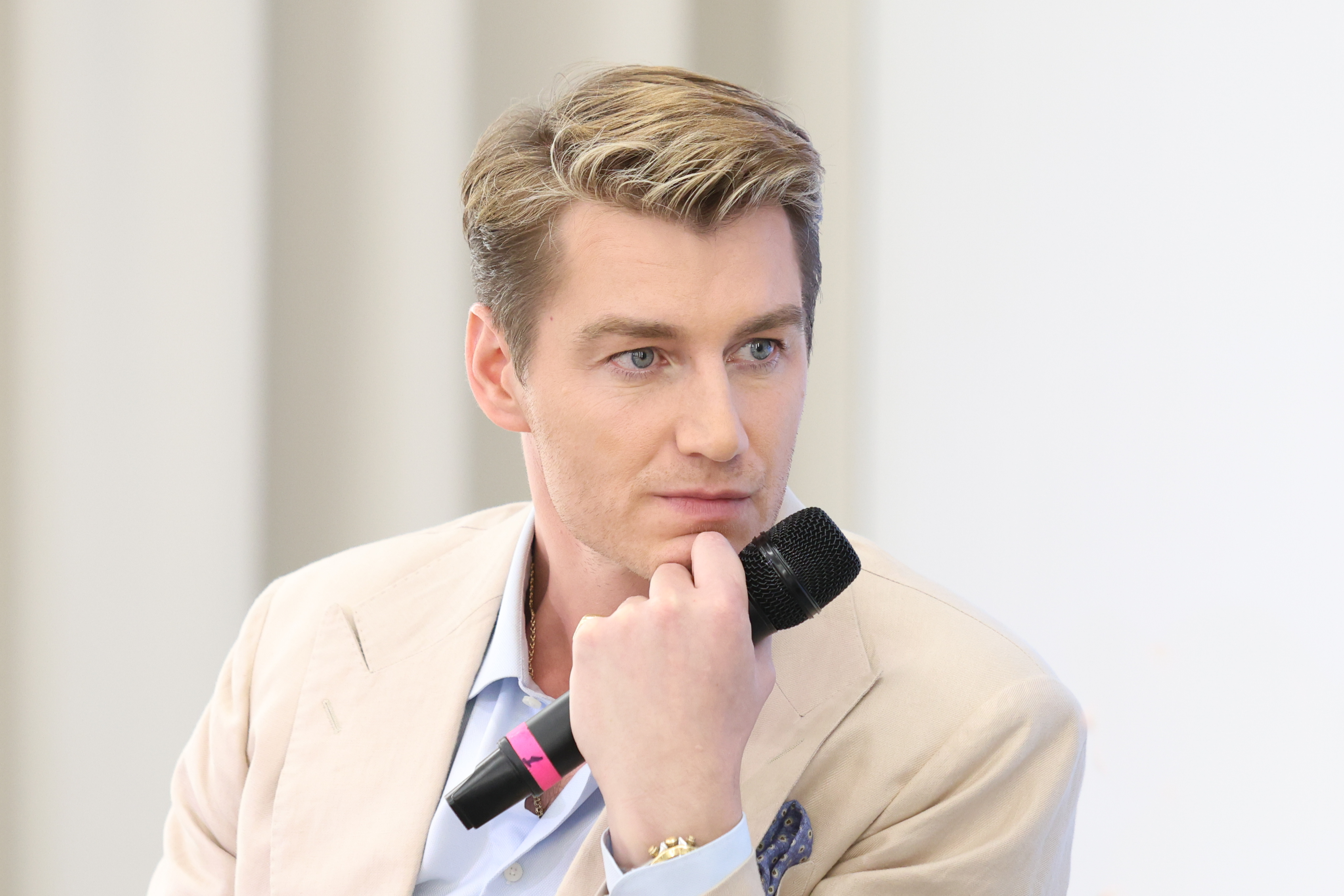
- Vorobyov in 2025

Background information
- Born: Alexey Vladimirovich Vorobyov; 19 January 1988 (age 38); Tula, Russian SFSR, Soviet Union
- Genre: Pop music
- Occupations: Singer, actor
- Instruments: Vocals, accordion
- Label: Universal Music Russia
- Spouse: Aida Garifullina (2025)
- Website: alexsparrow.com

Alexey Vladimirovich Vorobyov (Russian: Алексей Владимирович Воробьёв; 19 January 1988) is a Russian singer and actor who performs both in Russian and English. For international purposes Vorobyov is also credited as Alex Sparrow, a translation of his Russian name.

He is best known for appearing on the Russian version of The X Factor at the age of 17 in 2005. In 2006 Vorobyov was contracted by Universal Music Russia, and in December 2007 was appointed as a goodwill ambassador for Y-PEER, a youth-based initiative of the United Nations Population Fund. Vorobyov represented Russia in the Eurovision Song Contest 2011 in Germany. He was one of the domestic presenters for Intervision 2025.

== Early life ==
Alex was born on 19 January 1988 in Tula (Russian: Тула), RSFSR, Soviet Union. His father, Vladimir Viktorovich Vorobyov, is Head of Security, and his mother is a housewife. Alex played football as a child and played for the local youth team in Tula. At first, he wanted to pursue a career in sports but later chose to pursue music as his profession.

== Music career ==
Alex studied the accordion at the College of Music. While there, he participated in many competitions. When Alex graduated he decided to return to the musical school, however this time he opted to study in the vocal department. For a short period of time, he was the lead singer of the Tula folklore ensemble "Delight."

In 2005, Alex won the gold medal for his solo performance at the Delphic Games IV. In the same year Alex went to Moscow where he was ranked No. 3 in a TV competition. He later moved to Moscow and entered more competitions. In 2006, he signed a contract with Universal Music Russia. In July of that year Alex was one of the performers at the "Big Eight" which was held in St Petersburg. He was one of the executors of "Youth Eight" and was also given the opportunity to sing during the closing ceremony. In 2007, Alex won an MTV award for upcoming artists.

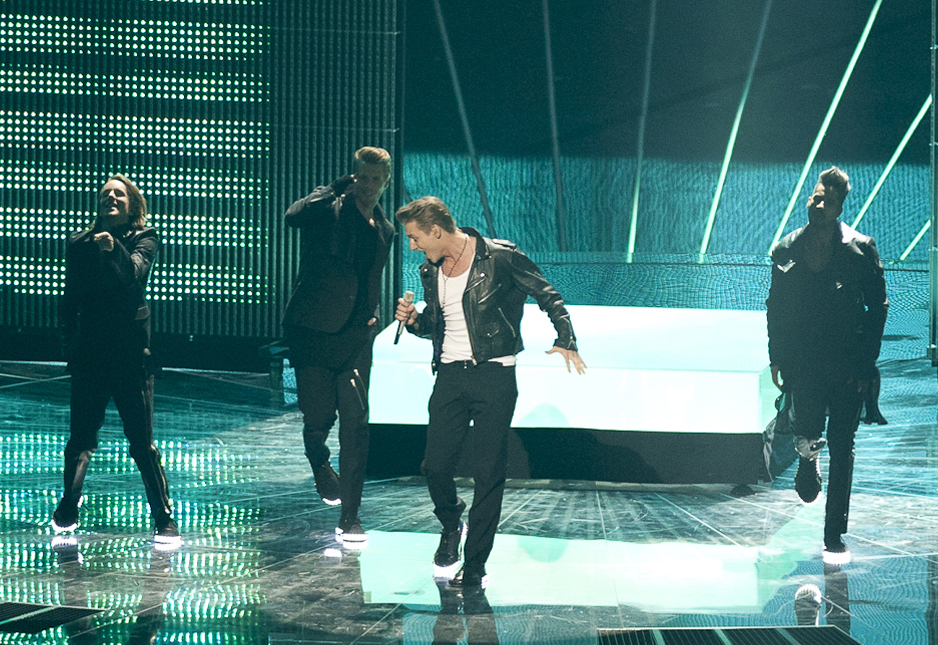
Vorobyov from performing "Get You" at Eurovision Song Contest 2011 in Düsseldorf

In 2008 and 2009 he competed in the Russian national selections for the Eurovision Song Contest with the songs "New Russian Kalinka" and "Angelom byt", but lost to Dima Bilan and Anastasia Prikhodko respectively. On 5 March 2011, he was eventually selected to represent the Russian Federation in the Eurovision Song Contest 2011, with the song "Get You," written by highly successful Moroccan producer Nadir Khayat (RedOne). He finished 16th overall in the contest.

After recovering from a serious car accident he suffered in early 2013, Vorobyov returned with music he has written, composed and arranged himself. Called Friend project, it is a collaboration with his friend, Russian actor Sergei Romanovich. The latter had already appeared in Laskoviy Mai, a film about the career of the famous Soviet band of the same name.

== Acting career ==
His acting career took off in 2006 when he starred in "Alice's Dream." Alex later enrolled in acting school. Spring 2008 saw Alex graduate from the theater school. He later became a student of the Moscow Art Theater School. Once his employment in acting was well established, Alex left the school. In 2010, Alex took part in a reality series called "Cruel Intentions," he made it to the finals finishing in second place. Later that year, he enlisted as a candidate on the TV show "Ice and Fire" in which he paired up with the Olympic ice-dancer Tatiana Navka (Russian: Татьяна Навка). Despite an arm injury, Alex continued his participation in the show.

On 26 September 2019, it was announced that Alex Sparrow was cast as Yuri "Bobby" Telatovich in the Netflix comedy series, Space Force.

== Personal life ==
In 2011 Alex Sparrow dated Russian pop star Victoria Dayneko.

On 22 January 2013 Alex Sparrow was seriously injured in a car crash in Los Angeles, United States, after his Porsche hit another car. Alex was taken to a hospital with a brain trauma and several other injuries, which ended up in half of his face going numb, and put him in intensive care. He recovered and slowly returned to recording and acting.

In April 2025, Aleksey Vorobyev married Aida Garifullina.

== Discography ==
=== Singles ===
- 2006 — Leto (Summer)
- 2007 — Alisa
- 2007 — Devchonka (Girl)
- 2007 — Seychas ili Nikogda (Now or never)
- 2007 — Russkie Zabili (Russian's forgot)
- 2008 — Desire
- 2008 — New Russian Kalinka
- 2008 — Toska
- 2008 — Ti i Ya (You and I)
- 2008 — Zabud Menya (Forget me)
- 2009 — Accordeon
- 2009 — Reality
- 2010 — Shout It Out
- 2011 — Get You
- 2015 — Sumasshedshaya (She's crazy but she's mine)
- 2016 — Samaja Krasiwaja (The beauty)

== Filmography ==
- Backwater District (2009) Main Protagonist
- The Phobos (2010)
- The Three Musketeers (2013)
- Sin City: A Dame to Kill For (2014)
- The Vatican Tapes (2015)
- Unreal (2017) Special Guest/Recurring Role
- Space Force (2020) Recurring Role
- NCIS (2022) Special Guest
- The Undiamond Arm (2024) Gennady Petrovich Kozodoev
- Ballerina (2025) Assassin

Awards and achievements
Preceded by Peter Nalitch with "Lost and Forgotten"	Russia in the Eurovision Song Contest; 2011	Succeeded by Buranovskiye Babushki with "Party for Everybody"
