= Aleksandr Sapeta =

Russian footballer

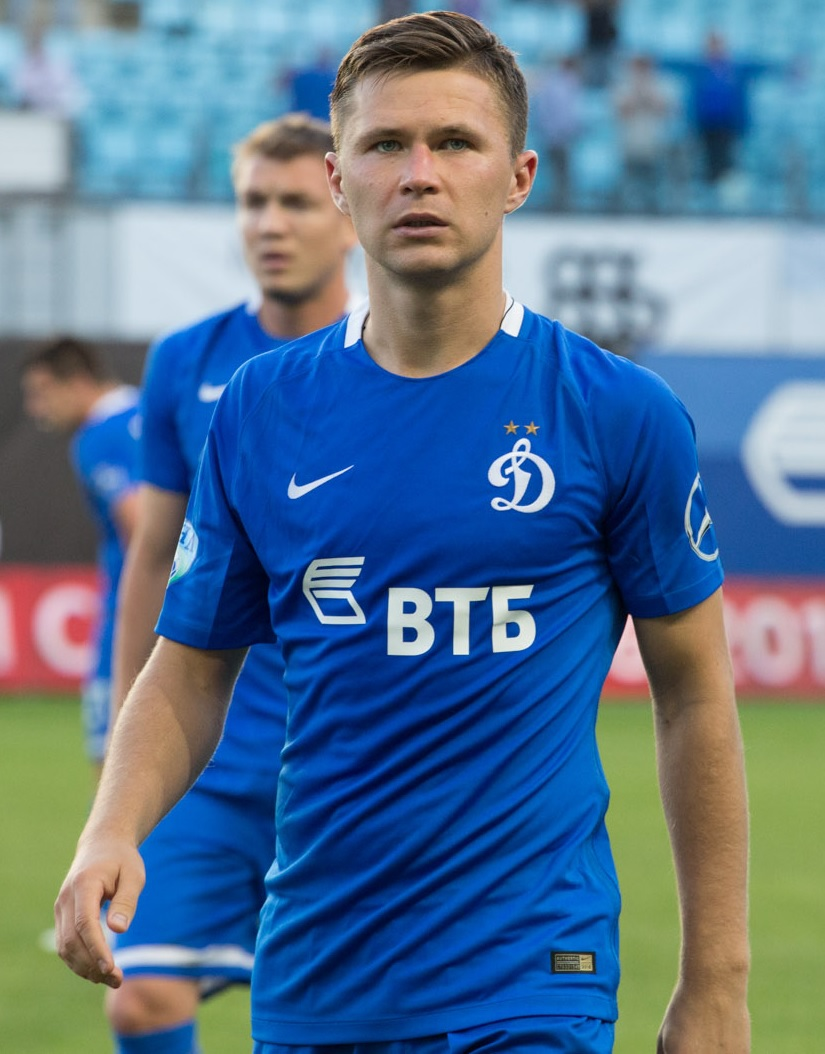
- Sapeta with Dynamo Moscow in 2016

Personal information
- Full name: Aleksandr Sergeyevich Sapeta
- Date of birth: 28 June 1989 (age 37)
- Place of birth: Engels, Saratov, Soviet Union
- Height: 1.79 m (5 ft 10 in)
- Position: Midfielder

Youth career
- 2003–2005: Rotor Volgograd
- 2005–2007: Saturn Ramenskoye

Senior career*
Years	Team	Apps	(Gls)
2007–2010	Saturn Ramenskoye	40	(3)
2011–2014	Dynamo Moscow	52	(2)
2013–2014	→ Ural (loan)	6	(1)
2014–2016	Ural	47	(8)
2016–2017	Dynamo Moscow	45	(3)
2018	Rostov	5	(0)
2018–2022	Nizhny Novgorod	87	(11)
2022	→ Kuban Krasnodar (loan)	11	(1)
2022–2023	Volga Ulyanovsk	9	(0)
2024	Dynamo St. Petersburg	15	(0)
2024	Pari NN-2 Nizhny Novgorod	7	(0)

International career
2005–2006	Russia U17	5	(0)
	Russia U20	8	(2)
2010	Russia U21	4	(1)
2011–2012	Russia-2	5	(1)
- * Club domestic league appearances and goals

Aleksandr Sergeyevich Sapeta (Russian: Александр Серге́евич Сапета; born 28 June 1989) is a Russian former footballer who played as central midfielder.

== Club career ==
He has been playing in the Saturn system throughout his youth years. He made his debut for the main Saturn team on 26 October 2008 when he was a starter in the Premier League match against FC Moscow.

In winter 2011 Sapeta was signed by FC Dynamo Moscow.

On 9 August 2012, he came off the bench to score a brace in a 5–0 win against Dundee United in the second leg of their third qualifying round tie in the 2012–13 UEFA Europa League.

On 22 February 2018, he signed a 2-year contract with FC Rostov. He was released from his Rostov contract by mutual consent on 21 August 2018.

On 27 January 2022, he joined FC Kuban Krasnodar on loan.

On 1 March 2024 he signed with FC Dynamo Saint Petersburg from the Russian Second League.

== International career ==
Sapeta was one of the members of the Russian U-17 squad that won the 2006 UEFA U-17 Championship.

== Career statistics ==
As of 12 December 2021

Club	Season	League			Cup		Continental		Other		Total	
Club	Season	Division	Apps	Goals	Apps	Goals	Apps	Goals	Apps	Goals	Apps	Goals
Saturn Ramenskoye	2007	RPL	0	0	1	0	–		–		1	0
Saturn Ramenskoye	2008	RPL	2	0	0	0	1 (Note: Appearance in the UEFA Intertoto Cup)	0	–		3	0
Saturn Ramenskoye	2009	RPL	14	0	1	0	–		–		15	0
Saturn Ramenskoye	2010	RPL	24	3	1	0	–		–		25	3
Saturn Ramenskoye	Total		40	3	3	0	1	0	0	0	44	3
Dynamo Moscow	2011–12	RPL	32	2	4	1	–		–		36	3
Dynamo Moscow	2012–13	RPL	20	0	2	0	4 (Note: Appearances in the UEFA Europa League)	2	–		26	2
Ural Yekaterinburg	2013–14	RPL	6	1	0	0	–		–		6	1
Ural Yekaterinburg	2014–15	RPL	18	1	0	0	–		1 (Note: Appearance in the relegation play-offs)	0	19	1
Ural Yekaterinburg	2015–16	RPL	29	7	2	0	–		–		31	7
Ural Yekaterinburg	Total		53	9	2	0	0	0	1	0	56	9
Dynamo Moscow	2016–17	FNL	33	3	3	0	–		–		36	3
Dynamo Moscow	2017–18	RPL	12	0	1	0	–		–		13	0
Dynamo Moscow	Total (2 spells)		97	5	10	1	4	2	0	0	111	8
Rostov	2017–18	RPL	5	0	–		–		–		5	0
Nizhny Novgorod	2018–19	FNL	24	3	2	0	–		2 (Note: Appearances in the promotion play-offs)	0	28	3
Nizhny Novgorod	2019–20	FNL	21	0	3	0	–		–		24	0
Nizhny Novgorod	2020–21	FNL	34	8	2	0	–		–		36	8
Nizhny Novgorod	2021–22	RPL	8	0	1	0	–		–		9	0
Nizhny Novgorod	Total		87	11	8	0	0	0	2	0	97	11
Career total			282	28	23	1	5	2	3	0	313	31
