= Nikolai Zabolotny =

Russian footballer

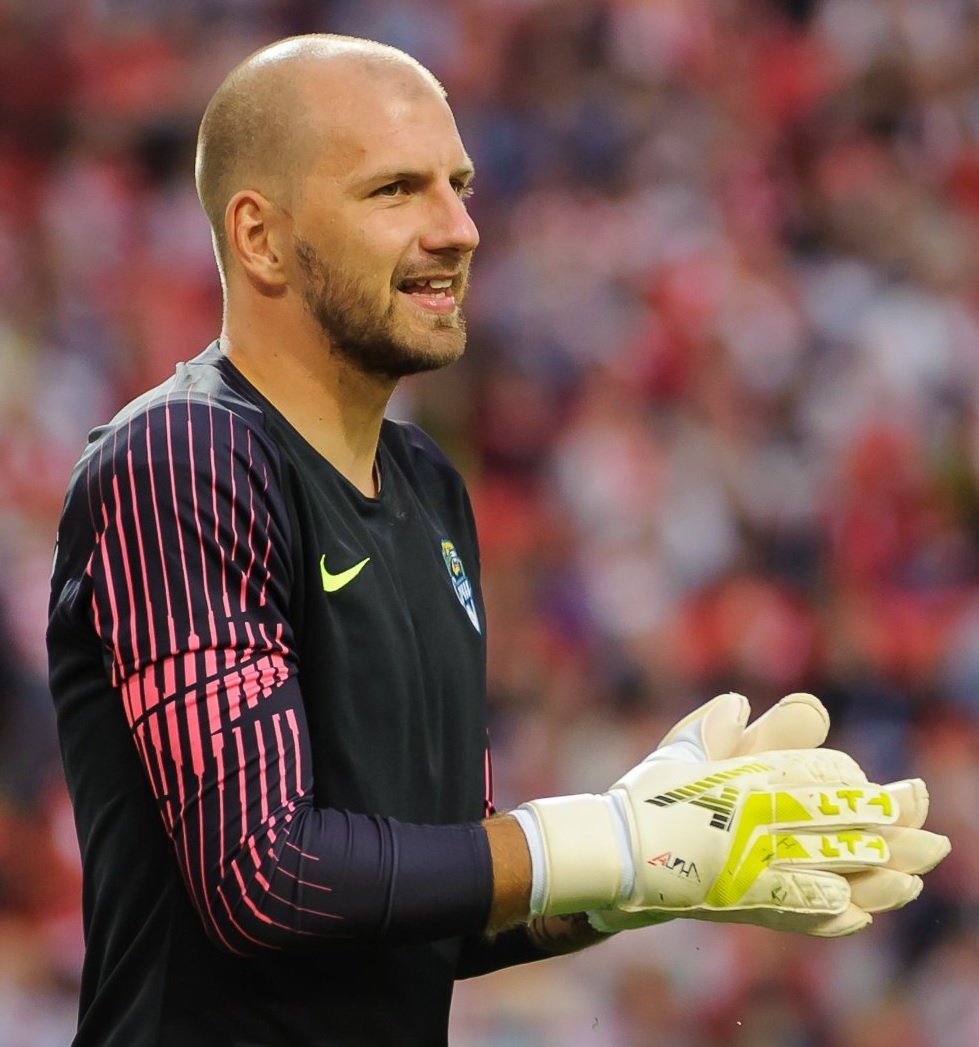
- Zabolotny with PFC Sochi in 2019

Personal information
- Full name: Nikolai Archilovich Zabolotny
- Date of birth: 16 April 1990 (age 36)
- Place of birth: Leningrad, Russian SFSR
- Height: 1.84 m (6 ft 0 in)
- Position: Goalkeeper

Youth career
- 2007–2009: Zenit St. Petersburg
- 2010–2011: Spartak Moscow

Senior career*
Years	Team	Apps	(Gls)
2008–2009	Zenit St. Petersburg	0	(0)
2010–2013	Spartak Moscow	6	(0)
2012–2013	→ Rostov (loan)	1	(0)
2013	→ Spartak-2 Moscow	9	(0)
2014–2017	Ural Yekaterinburg	72	(0)
2018	Rotor Volgograd	13	(0)
2018–2025	Sochi	81	(0)

International career^{‡}
2008	Russia U18	7	(0)
2009	Russia U19	4	(0)
2010–2013	Russia U21	24	(0)
- * Club domestic league appearances and goals as of 11 December 2025 ‡ National team caps and goals as of 22 March 2013

Nikolai Archilovich Zabolotny (Russian: Никола́й Арчи́лович Заболо́тный; born 16 April 1990) is a Russian former professional footballer who played as a goalkeeper.

== Club career ==
During his time with Zenit St. Petersburg, Zabolotny received several call-ups to the senior squad in 2008 and 2009, but remained on the bench in all of those games.

He made his debut for the main Spartak Moscow squad on 2 April 2011 in a Russian Premier League game against Kuban Krasnodar.

On 8 September 2017, his contract with Ural Yekaterinburg was dissolved by mutual consent.

On 30 May 2023, Zabolotny extended his contract with Sochi. On 5 September 2025, he left Sochi by mutual consent.

== Career statistics ==
=== Club ===
As of 24 May 2025

Club	Season	League			Cup		Continental		Other		Total	
Club	Season	Division	Apps	Goals	Apps	Goals	Apps	Goals	Apps	Goals	Apps	Goals
Zenit Saint Petersburg	2008	Russian Premier League	0	0	0	0	0	0	–		0	0
Zenit Saint Petersburg	2009	Russian Premier League	0	0	0	0	0	0	–		0	0
Zenit Saint Petersburg	Total		0	0	0	0	0	0	0	0	0	0
Spartak Moscow	2010	Russian Premier League	0	0	0	0	0	0	–		0	0
Spartak Moscow	2011–12	Russian Premier League	6	0	1	0	0	0	–		7	0
Spartak Moscow	2012–13	Russian Premier League	0	0	–		–		–		0	0
Spartak Moscow	Total		6	0	1	0	0	0	0	0	7	0
Rostov (loan)	2012–13	Russian Premier League	1	0	1	0	–		–		2	0
Spartak-2 Moscow	2013–14	Russian Second League	9	0	–		–		–		9	0
Ural Yekaterinburg	2013–14	Russian Premier League	11	0	–		–		–		11	0
Ural Yekaterinburg	2014–15	Russian Premier League	29	0	1	0	–		–		30	0
Ural Yekaterinburg	2015–16	Russian Premier League	10	0	0	0	–		–		10	0
Ural Yekaterinburg	2016–17	Russian Premier League	22	0	4	0	–		–		26	0
Ural Yekaterinburg	Total		72	0	5	0	0	0	0	0	77	0
Rotor Volgograd	2017–18	Russian First League	13	0	0	0	–		5 (Note: Appearances in FNL Cup)	0	18	0
Sochi	2018–19	Russian First League	35	0	0	0	–		–		35	0
Sochi	2019–20	Russian Premier League	5	0	0	0	–		–		5	0
Sochi	2020–21	Russian Premier League	9	0	2	0	–		–		11	0
Sochi	2021–22	Russian Premier League	7	0	0	0	3 (Note: Appearances in UEFA Conference League)	0	–		10	0
Sochi	2022–23	Russian Premier League	5	0	1	0	–		–		6	0
Sochi	2023–24	Russian Premier League	19	0	2	0	–		–		21	0
Sochi	2024–25	Russian First League	1	0	4	0	–		–		5	0
Sochi	Total		81	0	9	0	3	0	0	0	93	0
Career total			182	0	16	0	3	0	5	0	206	0
