= Arsen Goshokov =

Russian footballer

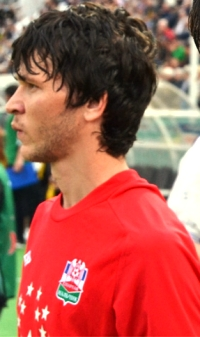

Personal information
- Full name: Arsen Aslanovich Goshokov
- Date of birth: 5 June 1991 (age 35)
- Place of birth: Baksan, Soviet Union
- Height: 1.80 m (5 ft 11 in)
- Position: Forward

Youth career
- 2006: PFC Spartak Nalchik

Senior career*
Years	Team	Apps	(Gls)
2007–2013	PFC Spartak Nalchik	97	(11)
2014–2015	FC Ural Sverdlovsk Oblast	0	(0)
2015	→ PFC Spartak Nalchik (loan)	14	(1)
2015–2016	FC KAMAZ Naberezhnye Chelny	26	(1)

International career
2008–2011	Russia U-19	3	(2)
2011	Russia U-21	3	(1)
- * Club domestic league appearances and goals

Arsen Aslanovich Goshokov (Russian: Арсен Асланович Гошоков; born 5 June 1991) is a Russian former footballer.

== Career statistics ==
Statistics accurate as of matches played on 22 August 2014

Club	Division	Season	League		Russian Cup		Total	
Club	Division	Season	Apps	Goals	Apps	Goals	Apps	Goals
PFC Spartak Nalchik	RPL	2008	8	0	0	0	8	0
PFC Spartak Nalchik	RPL	2009	3	1	1	0	4	1
PFC Spartak Nalchik	RPL	2010	17	2	1	0	18	2
PFC Spartak Nalchik	RPL	2011-12	32	4	0	0	32	4
PFC Spartak Nalchik	NFL	2012-13	16	1	0	0	16	1
PFC Spartak Nalchik	NFL	2013-14	20	2	0	0	20	2
PFC Spartak Nalchik	Total		96	10	2	0	98	10
FC Ural Sverdlovsk Oblast	RPL	2013-14	0	0	0	0	0	0
FC Ural Sverdlovsk Oblast	RPL	2014-15	0	0	0	0	0	0
FC Ural Sverdlovsk Oblast	Total		0	0	0	0	0	0
Career total			96	10	2	0	98	10
