= Maksim Lepskiy (footballer, born 1992) =

Russian footballer

Personal information
- Full name: Maksim Nikolayevich Lepskiy
- Date of birth: 8 April 1992 (age 34)
- Place of birth: Yalta, Ukraine
- Height: 1.87 m (6 ft 1 1/2 in)
- Position: Midfielder

Youth career
- –2006: Dynamo Moscow
- 2006–2007: CSKA Moscow
- 2007–2008: Khimki
- 2008–2010: Moscow

Senior career*
| Years | Team | Apps | (Gls) |
| 2010–2011 | Rubin-2 Kazan | 44 | (5) |
| 2012 | Sokol Saratov | 24 | (0) |
| 2013–2014 | Rostov | 2 | (0) |
| 2014–2015 | Khimki | 6 | (0) |
| 2015–2016 | Zenit Penza | 30 | (2) |
| 2017 | Naftan Novopolotsk | 12 | (0) |
- * Club domestic league appearances and goals as of 4 August 2018

Maksim Nikolayevich Lepskiy (Russian: Максим Николаевич Лепский; born 8 April 1992) is a retired Russian professional football player who last played for Naftan Novopolotsk.
