= Roman Emelyanov =

Russian radio and television personality

Roman Alexandrovich Emelyanov (Russian: Роман Александрович Емельянов), better known as simply Roman Emelyanov (Russian: Роман Емельянов) (born 3 June 1975 in Moscow, Soviet Union) is a Russian radio and television personality.

In 1995–1996, Emelyanov (also pronounced Yemelyanov in Russian) worked as an "AvtoRadio" musical program narrator and in 1998–1999 was a musical program narrator and creative director on "Radio 7". From 1999 until 2004, he became the show narrator and public relations manager at "ElDoradio" in Sankt Petersburg. In 2004 he moved to "Retro-FM" as a special programs producer and from 2007 to 2015, he was the Program Director of "Russkoe Radio" and "Hit FM".

In 2011, he became one of the judges of the musical talent competition Faktor A, the Russian version of The X Factor on Russia 1 television.

In 2016, Emelyanov became the president and chief executive officer of the European Media Group (EMG), the oldest and leading commercial radio broadcasting company in Russia. EMG - which is a subsidiary of Ural Mining and Metallurgical Company (UGMK) - owns most of the radio stations he worked for in the past, including "Radio 7", "Retro-FM" and "ElDoradio".

He co-founded the radio station "Novoe Radio" in 2015 with Vladimir Yakunin, Alexander Pirkov, and Stanislav Arkhipov. "Novoe Radio" joined the EMG network of stations after a few months of gaining listenership.

== Career ==
- 1995-1996 — host at AvtoRadio
- 1997-1999 — creative producer and host at Radio 7
- 1999-2004 — PR manager and host of the morning show “Good Morning” at ElDoradio (Saint Petersburg)
- 2004-2007 — producer of special projects and host of the morning show "Cup of Coffee" at Retro FM
- 2007-2015 — program director at Russkoye Radio and Hit FM
- 2015-present — co-founder and general producer at Novoe Radio
- 2016-present — president and chief executive officer at European Media Group

== Filmography ==
Year	Title	Network	Role	Notes
2007	RetroMania	REN TV	Host	—N/a
2007	Legendy Retro FM (Legends of Retro FM)	Channel One	Host	with Tatyana Vedeneyeva
2008-2010	Slava bogu, ty prishol (Thank God You're Here)	STS	Participant	Seasons 2-4
2011-2013	Faktor A (The A Factor)	Russia-1	Jury	with Alla Pugacheva, Lolita Milyavskaya, Boris Krasnov and Igor Nikolayev
2012	Rassmeshi komika (Make the Comedian Laugh)	Russia-1	Host	—N/a
2014	11th International Humor Festival	Russia-1	Host	with Nikolay Baskov
2014	Nash vykhod (Our Way Out)	Russia-1	Jury	with Stas Namin, Oleg Gazmanov and Yulia Nachalova; Also a co-producer
2014	Bolshoy vopros (The Big Question)	STS	Participant	—N/a
2015	Russia Day Festival in Yalta	Russia-1	Host	with Maxim Galkin, Yana Churikova and Pelageya
2019-present	Novaya Zvezda (The New Star)	Zvezda	Jury	with Maksim Dunayevsky, Yuri Nikolaev, Yulia Savicheva and Zara
