= Igor Kot =

Russian footballer

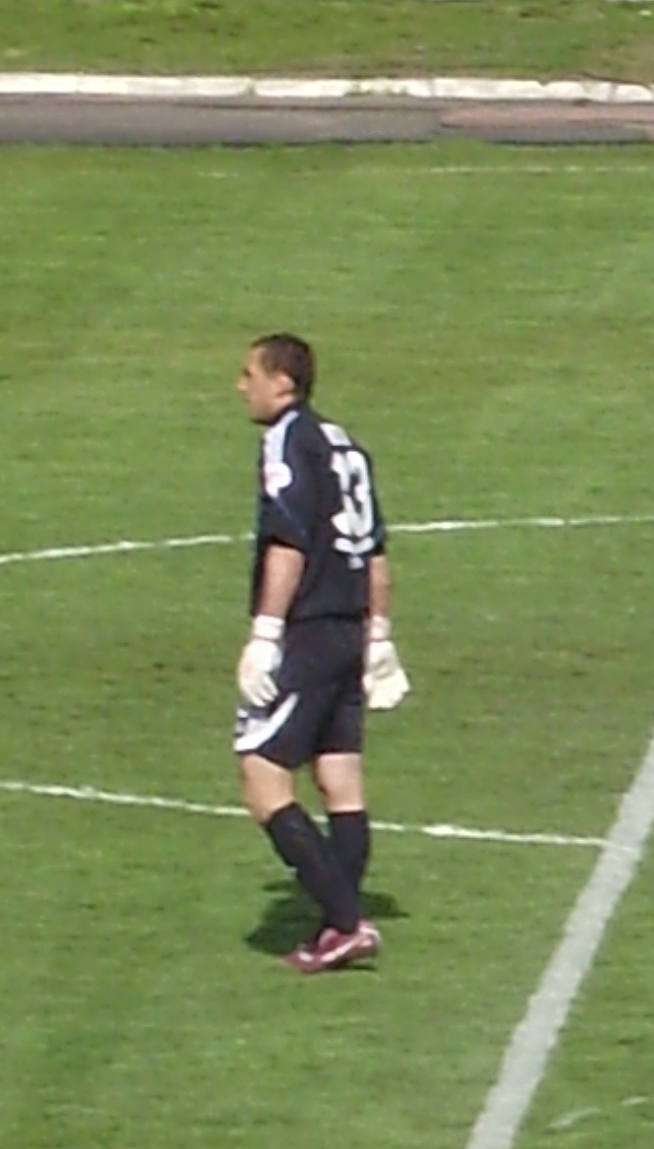

Personal information
- Full name: Igor Aleksandrovich Kot
- Date of birth: 3 June 1980 (age 46)
- Place of birth: Krasnodar, Soviet Union
- Height: 1.86 m (6 ft 1 in)
- Position: Goalkeeper

Youth career
- FC Dynamo Krasnodar

Senior career*
Years	Team	Apps	(Gls)
1999	FC Dynamo Krasnodar		
2000	FC Kuban Krasnodar	0	(0)
2001–2002	FC Krasnodar-2000 Krasnodar	62	(0)
2003	FC Sodovik Sterlitamak	21	(0)
2004–2008	FC Kuban Krasnodar	16	(0)
2009	FC Chernomorets Novorossiysk	19	(0)
2010	FC Gazovik Orenburg	15	(0)
2011–2015	FC Ural Sverdlovsk Oblast	70	(0)
2015–2016	FC Arsenal Tula	7	(0)
2016	FC Mordovia Saransk	2	(0)
2017	FC Sochi	7	(0)
- * Club domestic league appearances and goals

Igor Aleksandrovich Kot (Russian: Игорь Александрович Кот; born 3 June 1980) is a Russian former professional footballer.

== Club career ==
He made his debut in the Russian Premier League in 2004 for FC Kuban Krasnodar.
