= Sekret Uspekha =

Russian television series

- Russian: Секрет успеха
- Created by: Simon Cowell
- Presented by: Aleksey Chumakov (Season 1); Elena Vorobey (Season 1); Tutta Larsen (Season 2)
- Starring: Vladimir Sapovsky (Season 1, 2005); Nikolay Timokhin (Season 2, 2007) (winners)
- Judges: Valery Meladze (Season 1); Katerina Von Gechmen-Valdek (Season 1); Aleksandr Revzin (Season 1); Valery Garkalin (Season 2); Valeriya (Season 2); Tigran Keosayan (Season 2)
- Country of origin: Russia
- Original language: Russian
- No. of seasons: 2

Production
- Production location: Moscow

Original release
- Network: RTR
- Release: 2005 (Season 1) – 2007 (Season 2)

Related
- The X Factor; Faktor A

Sekret Uspekha (Russian: Секрет успеха 'Secret of Success') was a Russian popular music talent show, broadcast on Saturdays on RTR. It was similar in format to Narodniy Artist, and was the Russian version of the British show The X Factor, created by Simon Cowell. The show is primarily concerned with identifying singing talent, though personality, stage presence and dance routines are also an important element of many performances.

There were two seasons. The first was in 2005 and title was won by Vladimir Sapovskiy. A second and final series was broadcast in 2007, and title won by Nikolay Timokhin.

The show was cancelled after two season because of insufficient number of viewers, but after the immense success of the X Factor series internationally, a new Russian series was launched, named Faktor A (in Russian Фактор А) after the name of Alla Pugacheva rather than Faktor X.

== Series format ==
There were four stages to the competition:

- Stage 1: Auditions
- Stage 2: Bootcamp
- Stage 3: Visits to judges' homes
- Stage 4: Live shows (finals)

The competition is split into three categories: vocal groups (including duos), solo singers aged 16–24, and solo singers aged 25 and over. There is, however, only one final winner.

In the initial weeks of the show, public auditions are held at various locations across Russia. Each act enters the audition room (often after waiting for hours), and delivers a stand-up unaccompanied performance of their chosen song to the three judges. If at least two of the four judges say "yes" then the act goes through to the next stage.

These auditions attract large numbers of hopefuls. Only a small selection of auditions are broadcast – usually the best, the worst and the most bizarre. Much like Pop Idol, many acts face harsh criticism from the judges.

After all auditions are complete, each of the three judges is allocated a category to mentor (supposedly at random). The contestants who survived stage one are then further refined through a series of performances at "boot camp" and at the judges' homes, until a small number eventually progress to the live finals.

In the live shows, each act performs a new song or songs each week in front of an auditorium audience as well as the judges. The songs chosen are usually pop standards or contemporary hits. Members of the public vote on the acts by telephone or text message, and this, in combination with the judges' opinions, determines which act is dismissed. The contestants are whittled away week by week until the winner eventually emerges.

== Judges' categories and their contestants ==
In each season, each judge is allocated a category to mentor and chooses three acts to progress to the live shows. This table shows, for each season, which category each judge was allocated and which acts he or she put through to the live shows.

Key:

– Winning judge/category. Winners are in bold, eliminated contestants in small font.

Season	Valery Meladze	Katerina Von Gechmen-Valdek	Aleksandr Revzin
One	**Groups**; Queens; 8 Marta; Nota Fraid	**16-24s** Yevgeniya Otradnaya; Alexey Vorobyov; Mariya Novikova	**Over 25s** **Vladimir Sapovsky**; Vladimir Dybsky; Aleksey Kuznetsov
Season	Valery Garkalin	Valeriya	Tigran Keosayan
Two	**Over 25s** Vitaly Gasaev; Yelena Gorskaya; Oskana Mukhina; Olga Chekadanova	**16-24s** **Nikolay Timokhin**; Ilya Vasilyev; Yekaterina Antonenko; Dmitry Karpinchik	**Groups**; Bridge; O'Da; Just Listen; Peekaboo

== Season 1 (2005) ==
The first season was broadcast in late 2005. The judges were Valeriy Meladze, Katerina Von Gechmen-Valdek and Aleksandr Revzin, and the show was hosted by Aleksey Chumakov and Yelena Vorobey. The winner of the first season in 2005 was Vladimir Sapovsky, with Yevgeniya Otradnaya as runner-up.

=== Contestants ===
Key:

– Winner
– Runner-up

Category (mentor)	Acts		
16–24s (Von Gechmen-Valdek)	Alexey Vorobyov (17)	Yevgeniya Otradnaya (19)	Mariya Novikova (21)
Over 25s (Revzin)	Aleksey Kuznetsov (25)	Vladimir Dybsky (36)	Vladimir Sapovsky (39)
Groups (Meladze)	8 Marta	Nota Fraid	Queens

=== Results Table ===
	Week 1	Week 2	Week 3	Week 4	Week 5	Week 6	Final
Vladimir Sapovsky	Safe	Safe	Safe	Safe	Safe	Safe	**Winner** (Final)
Yevgeniya Otradnaya	Safe	Safe	Safe	Safe	Safe	Safe	Runner-Up (Final)
Alexey Vorobyov	Safe	Safe	Safe	Safe	Safe	Safe	Bottom
Queens	Safe	Safe	Bottom two	Safe	Safe	Bottom	Eliminated (Week 6)
Mariya Novikova	Safe	Safe	Safe	Bottom two	Bottom	Eliminated (Week 5)	
8 Marta	Safe	Safe	Safe	Bottom two	Eliminated (Week 4)		
Vladimir Dybsky	Bottom two	Bottom two	Bottom two	Eliminated (Week 3)			
Nota Fraid	Safe	Bottom two	Eliminated (Week 2)				
Aleksey Kuznetsov	Bottom two	Eliminated (Week 1)					

== Season 2 (2007) ==
The second and final season was broadcast in 2007 and won by Nikolay Timokhin, with Ilya Vasilyev as runner-up. Three new judges took sat: Valeriya, Tigran Keosayan and Valery Garkalin.

=== Contestants ===
Key:

– Winner
– Runner-up

Category (mentor)	Acts			
16–24s (Valeriya )	Dmitry Karpinchik (21)	Il'ya Vasil'yev (23)	Yekaterina Antonenko (18)	Nikolay Timokhin (18)
Over 25s (Garkalin)	Yelena Gorskaya (28)	Oskana Mukhina (27)	Ol'ga Chekadanova (42)	Vitaly Gasaev (36)
Groups (Keosayan)	Bridge	Just Listen	O'Da	Peekaboo

=== Results Table ===
	Week 1	Week 2	Week 3	Week 4	Week 5	Week 6	Week 7	Week 8	Week 9	Final
Nikolay Timokhin	Safe	Safe	Safe	Safe	Safe	Safe	Safe	Safe	Safe	**Winner** (Final)
Ilya Vasilyev	Safe	Safe	Safe	Safe	Safe	Safe	Safe	Safe	Safe	Runner-Up (Final)
Vitaly Gasaev	Safe	Safe	Safe	Safe	Safe	Safe	Safe	Safe	Safe	Bottom
Bridge	Safe	Safe	Safe	Safe	Bottom two	Safe	Safe	Safe	Bottom	Eliminated (Week 9)
Yelena Gorskaya	Safe	Safe	Safe	Safe	Safe	Safe	Safe	Bottom	Eliminated (Week 8)	
O'Da	Safe	Safe	Safe	Bottom two	Safe	Bottom two	Bottom	Eliminated (Week 7)		
Just Listen	Safe	Safe	Safe	Safe	Safe	Bottom two	Eliminated (Week 6)			
Oksana Mukhina	Bottom two	Safe	Bottom two	Safe	Bottom two	Eliminated (Week 5)				
Yekaterina Antonenko	Safe	Safe	Safe	Bottom two	Eliminated (Week 4)					
Peekaboo	Safe	Bottom two	Bottom two	Eliminated (Week 3)						
Olga Chekadanova	Safe	Bottom two	Eliminated (Week 2)							
Dmitry Karpinchik	Bottom two	Eliminated (Week 1)								

== See also ==
- Faktor A
