= Roman Yemelyanov =

Russian footballer

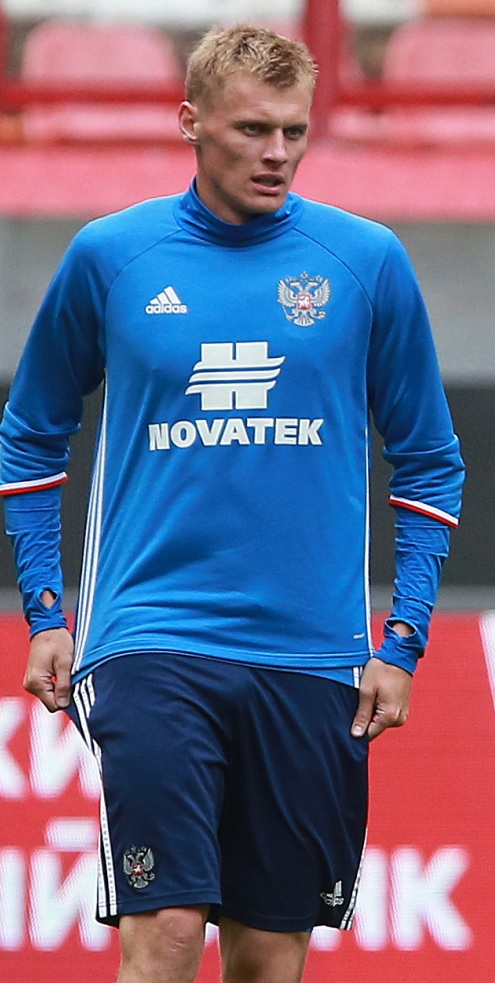
- Yemelyanov with Russia in 2016

Personal information
- Full name: Roman Pavlovich Yemelyanov
- Date of birth: 8 May 1992 (age 34)
- Place of birth: Pavlovo, Russia
- Height: 1.89 m (6 ft 2 in)
- Position: Defensive midfielder

Youth career
- Spartak Pavlovo
- Konoplyov football academy

Senior career*
Years	Team	Apps	(Gls)
2008–2009	Tolyatti	23	(1)
2010–2015	Shakhtar Donetsk	1	(0)
2010–2011	→ Zorya Luhansk (loan)	14	(0)
2011–2012	→ Rostov (loan)	14	(0)
2012–2013	→ Illichivets Mariupol (loan)	35	(0)
2013–2014	→ Rostov (loan)	7	(0)
2014–2015	→ Ural Yekaterinburg (loan)	3	(0)
2015–2024	Ural Yekaterinburg	124	(1)
2022–2024	→ Shinnik Yaroslavl (loan)	33	(0)
2024–2026	SKA-Khabarovsk	31	(1)

International career^{‡}
2010	Russia U-18	10	(2)
2011	Russia U-19	13	(1)
2011–2013	Russia U-21	11	(0)
- * Club domestic league appearances and goals as of 16 May 2026 ‡ National team caps and goals as of 19 November 2013

Roman Pavlovich Yemelyanov (Russian: Роман Павлович Емельянов; born 8 May 1992) is a Russian professional football player who plays as a defensive midfielder.

== Career ==
=== Konoplyov football academy ===
Yemelyanov started football education in Konoplyov football academy. At the age of 16 Yemelyanov started to play for Tolyatti.

=== Shakhtar Donetsk ===
On 24 January 2010, he signed a 3-year contract with Ukrainian side Shakhtar Donetsk. In August of the same year, he was loaned to FC Zorya Luhansk.

=== Shinnik Yaroslavl ===
On 8 September 2022, Yemelyanov was loaned to Shinnik Yaroslavl. On 16 June 2023, the loan was extended for the 2023–24 season.

=== International ===
He was called up to the senior Russia squad in August 2016 for matches against Turkey and Ghana.

== Career statistics ==
=== Club ===
As of 27 November 2022

Club	Season	League			Cup		Continental		Other		Total	
Club	Season	Division	Apps	Goals	Apps	Goals	Apps	Goals	Apps	Goals	Apps	Goals
Tolyatti	2008	PFL	3	0	–		–		–		3	0
Tolyatti	2009	PFL	20	1	–		–		–		20	1
Tolyatti	Total		23	1	0	0	0	0	0	0	23	1
Zorya Luhansk	2010–11	UPL	14	0	3	0	–		–		17	0
Shakhtar Donetsk	2011–12	UPL	1	0	–		–		–		1	0
Rostov	2011–12	RPL	14	0	3	0	–		2 (Note: Appearances in the relegation play-offs)	0	19	0
Illichivets	2012–13	UPL	20	0	1	0	–		–		21	0
Illichivets	2013–14	UPL	15	0	0	0	–		–		15	0
Illichivets	Total		35	0	1	0	0	0	0	0	36	0
Rostov	2013–14	RPL	7	0	0	0	–		–		7	0
Rostov	Total		21	0	3	0	0	0	2	0	26	0
Ural Yekaterinburg	2014–15	RPL	14	0	1	0	–		2	0	17	0
Ural Yekaterinburg	2015–16	RPL	24	0	1	0	–		–		25	0
Ural Yekaterinburg	2016–17	RPL	23	1	5	0	–		2 (Note: Appearances in the FNL Cup)	0	30	1
Ural Yekaterinburg	2017–18	RPL	25	0	1	0	–		3	0	29	0
Ural Yekaterinburg	2018–19	RPL	12	0	3	0	–		–		15	0
Ural Yekaterinburg	2019–20	RPL	14	0	2	0	–		1	0	17	0
Ural Yekaterinburg	2020–21	RPL	11	0	2	0	–		–		13	0
Ural Yekaterinburg	2021–22	RPL	2	0	0	0	–		–		2	0
Ural Yekaterinburg	2022–23	RPL	2	0	0	0	–		–		2	0
Ural Yekaterinburg	Total		127	1	15	0	0	0	8	0	150	1
Shinnik Yaroslavl	2022–23	First League	10	0	1	0	–		–		11	0
Career total			231	2	23	0	0	0	10	0	264	2
