= Faktor A =

Russian television series

- Logo
- Russian: Фактор А
- Created by: Simon Cowell
- Presented by: Philipp Kirkorov; Volodymyr Zelenskyy (2011); Alexey Chumakov (2012)
- Judges: Alla Pugacheva; Lolita Milyavskaya; Roman Emelyanov; Boris Krasnov (2011); Igor Nikolayev (2012)
- Country of origin: Russia
- Original language: Russian
- No. of seasons: 3 (debut season in 2011)
- No. of episodes: 22

Production
- Running time: ~78 minutes

Original release
- Network: Rossiya 1 Muz-TV (2011)
- Release: 1 April 2011 – 21 April 2013

Faktor A (Russian: Фактор А) is the second Russian version of The X Factor television talent show franchise. Having broadcast on Rossiya 1 from 2011 to 2013, the show is named Faktor A (rather than Faktor X), with the letter "A" chosen in honor of Alla Pugacheva, head of the jury. Faktor A debuted in 2011 as a new season 1.

== Sekret Uspekha (2005, 2007) ==
Faktor A is considered a continuation of an earlier Russian show Sekret Uspekha, which was broadcast on Russia's RTR television station in contrast to Faktor A, courtesy of Russia-1.

There were two seasons of Sekret Uspekha. The first was in 2005 and the title was won by Vladimir Sapovsky. A second season was broadcast in 2007, and the title won by Nikolay Timokhin. The show was cancelled after two seasons because of the insufficient number of viewers.

Although similar in format, the new show Faktor A was considered a whole new series with season 1 starting in April 2011.

== Series overview ==
- Contestant in team Roman Emelyanov (Groups)
- Contestant in team Lolita (ages 16–24)
- Head of jury Alla Pugacheva
- Contestant in team Boris Krasnov (25 and older)
- Contestant in team Igor Nikolaev (ages 16–24)

Season	First aired	Last aired	Winner	Runner-up	Third Place	Winning mentor	Hosts		Chairs (order)			
Season	First aired	Last aired	Winner	Runner-up	Third Place	Winning mentor	Hosts		1	2	3	4
1	April 1, 2011	June 11, 2011	Sergei Savin	Erkin Holmatov	Artyom Kacharyan	Boris Krasnov	Philipp Kirkorov	Volodymyr Zelenskyy	Roman Emelyanov	Lolita Milyavskaya	Alla Pugacheva	Boris Krasnov
2	March 10, 2012	May 27, 2012	Alexey Sulima	Ekaterina Leshcheva	Alexandr Balykov	Igor Nikolaev	Philipp Kirkorov	Alexey Chumakov	Roman Emelyanov	Lolita Milyavskaya	Alla Pugacheva	Igor Nikolaev
3	February 9, 2013	April 21, 2013	Mali	Yuliya Samoylova	Yaroslav Dronov	Igor Nikolaev	Philipp Kirkorov	—N/a	Roman Emelyanov	Lolita Milyavskaya	Alla Pugacheva	Igor Nikolaev

== Season 1 (2011) ==
The new Faktor A show's main purpose was to find new singing talent. Contestants were chosen through public auditions. The show was hosted by Philipp Kirkorov and Volodymyr Zelenskyy. The jury was made up of Lolita Milyavskaya, Boris Krasnov and Roman Emelyanov. Alla Pugacheva served as chairman of the jury. Milyavskya was the mentor for contestants aged 16 to 24, Krasnov for contestants over the age of 25, and Emelyanov for duos groups.

The auditions were held on 23 and 24 March 2011 in Moscow's Malaya Luzhniki Sports Arena. Then each judge selected their best three performers after trials from 25–27 March 2011.

=== Categories ===
The competition was split into three categories:

- Singers aged 16 to 24
- Singers over 25
- Groups (including duos).

Each judge was assigned a particular category and was entrusted to mentor the competitors in that specific category.

=== Contestants ===
– Winner
– Runner-up

Category (mentor)	Acts		
16–25s (Lolita Milyavskaya)	Victoria Cherentsova	Erkin Holmatov	Artyom Kacharian
Over 25s (Boris Krasnov)	Philip Kruzhkov	Sergei Savin	Vladislav Tumanov
Groups (Roman Emelyanov)	Mark Twain	DaKi	Sixth Sense

=== Shows ===
- Show 1 (1 April 2011) - first stage of auditions
- Show 2 (8 April 2011) - second stage of auditions and deciding the 9 finalist
- Show 3 (15 April 2011) - first live show (Theme: "Soviet Popular Songs")
- Show 4 (22 April 2011) - second live show (Theme: "Songs from the movies"). Vladislav Tumanov originating from Ekaterinburg was eliminated finishing 9th
- Show 5 (19 April 2011) - third live show (Theme: "World Hits"). Philip Krishkov originating from Moscow was eliminated finishing 8th
- Show 6 (6 May 2011) - fourth live show (Theme: "Songs of Love"). Group Шестое чувство ("The Sixth Sense") from Moscow eliminated finishing 7th.
- Show 7 (13 May 2011) - fifth live show (Theme: "Songs about cities and countries). The duo ДаКи ("DaKi") from Kaluga were eliminated finishing 6th.
- Show 8 (20 May 2011) - sixth live show (Theme: "Modern Hits"). Through public vote, "Mark Twain" and Victoria Cherentsova were voted bottom two by the public. But Alla Pugacheva decided to keep both in competition.
- Show 9 (27 May 2011) - seventh live show (Themes: Favorite songs" and "Author's songs"). After the decision of the previous week to save both bottom 2 from elimination, it was agreed that two contestants would be eliminated at the end of show 9 from a bottom three announced. The bottom three were: Group Mark Twain, and contestants Sergei Savin and Victoria Cherentsova. Then it was announced that Mark Twain had received the fewest votes and was eliminated first 5th. Eventually Victoria Cherentsova was eliminated finishing 4th. Sergei Savin moves to Final 3.
- Show 10 (3 June 2011) - eighth live show (Themes: "Candidate's most successful song during all stages of competition" and "Duet with famous Russian pop singers". As a result of public vote, Erkin Holmatov was considered "safe". In the danger zone were the other two Top 3 finalist Sergei Savin and Artyom Kacharyan. As a result of a jury vote, Artyom Kacharyan was eliminated finishing 3rd overall in the competition.
- Show 11 (10 June 2011) - the final show. After all the participants opened the show with a collective song, the two finalists Erkin Holmatov and Sergei Savin sang a duet, as well as two solo songs each. The winner of the project was determined by public voting and by voting by judges Boris Krasnov, Lolita and Roman Emelyanov (1 vote each) and Alla Pugacheva (2 votes) and the audience (2 votes). As a result, on the final results show on June 11, 2011, Sergei Savin (in Russian Сергей Савин) was announced winner of the inaugural season, and Erkin Holmatov (in Russian Эркин Холматов) as runner-up.

=== Final classification ===
1. Sergei Savin - Winner
2. Erkin Holmatov - Runner-Up
3. Artyom Kacharyan
4. Victoria Cherentsova
5. Group Марк Твен ("Mark Twain")
6. Duo ДаКи ("DaKi")
7. Шестое чувство ("Sixth Sense")
8. Philip Kruzhkov
9. Vladislav Tumanov

=== Prizes ===
Sergei Savin, who won the inaugural season, received a record deal for a solo album, a shooting of a music video and appearing on rotation on Russian radio station Avtoradio ("Авторадио"). The runner-up Erkin Holmatov received a cash prize of 30,000 Euros, the special prize "Golden Star of Alla" from main judge Alla Pugacheva, a 5-year scholarship to a music school in Gnessin.

== See also ==
- The Voice (Russia)
