= Arsen Oganesyan =

Russian footballer

Personal information
- Full name: Arsen Grigoryevich Oganesyan
- Date of birth: 17 June 1990 (age 36)
- Place of birth: Kaluga, Russian SFSR
- Height: 1.82 m (6 ft 0 in)
- Positions: Forward; midfielder

Senior career*
Years	Team	Apps	(Gls)
2008–2009	FC MiK Kaluga (amateur)		
2010	FC Khimki	6	(0)
2010	→ FC Kaluga (loan)	10	(0)
2011–2014	FC Kaluga	87	(13)
2014	FC Ural Sverdlovsk Oblast	5	(0)
2015	FC Sokol Saratov	5	(1)
2015–2018	FC Kaluga	58	(4)
- * Club domestic league appearances and goals

Arsen Grigoryevich Oganesyan (Russian: Арсен Григорьевич Оганесян; born 17 June 1990) is a Russian former professional football player of Armenian descent.

== Club career ==
He made his professional debut in the Russian First Division in 2010 for FC Khimki.

== Career statistics ==
Statistics accurate as of matches played on 22 August 2014

Club	Division	Season	League		Russian Cup		Total	
Club	Division	Season	Apps	Goals	Apps	Goals	Apps	Goals
FC Khimki	D1	2010	6	0	1	0	7	0
FC Kaluga (loan)	D2	2010	10	0	0	0	10	0
FC Kaluga	D2	2011–12	33	2	2	0	35	2
FC Kaluga	D2	2012–13	29	8	4	2	33	10
FC Kaluga	D2	2013–14	25	3	1	0	26	3
FC Ural Sverdlovsk Oblast	PL	2014–15	4	0	0	0	4	0
Career total			107	13	8	2	115	15
