= Vladimir Kisenkov =

Russian footballer

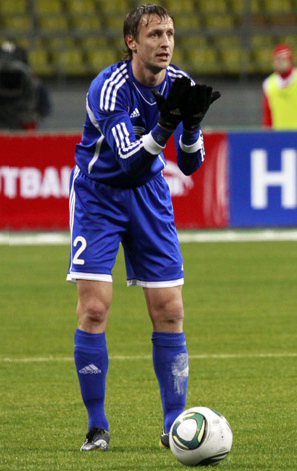

Personal information
- Full name: Vladimir Sergeyevich Kisenkov
- Date of birth: 8 October 1981 (age 45)
- Place of birth: Kaluga, Russian SFSR
- Height: 1.82 m (5 ft 11 1/2 in)
- Position: Defender

Youth career
- –1999: FC Lokomotiv Kaluga

Senior career*
Years	Team	Apps	(Gls)
2000–2003	FC Lokomotiv Kaluga	133	(3)
2004–2006	FC Vityaz Podolsk	49	(9)
2007–2010	PFC Spartak Nalchik	68	(8)
2010–2013	FC Dynamo Moscow	1	(0)
2012–2013	→ FC Rostov (loan)	14	(0)
2013–2014	FC Tom Tomsk	7	(0)
2016–2017	FC Kaluga	30	(1)
- * Club domestic league appearances and goals

Vladimir Sergeyevich Kisenkov (Russian: Владимир Серге́евич Кисенков; born 8 October 1981) is a former Russian footballer.

== Club career ==
He is famous for his strong long range shots.

Shortly after transferring to FC Dynamo Moscow in the summer of 2010, he was injured during training session in a collision with Kevin Kurányi and had to miss the rest of the 2010 season before he could play a single official game for his new club.
