= Gerson Acevedo =

Chilean footballer (born 1988)

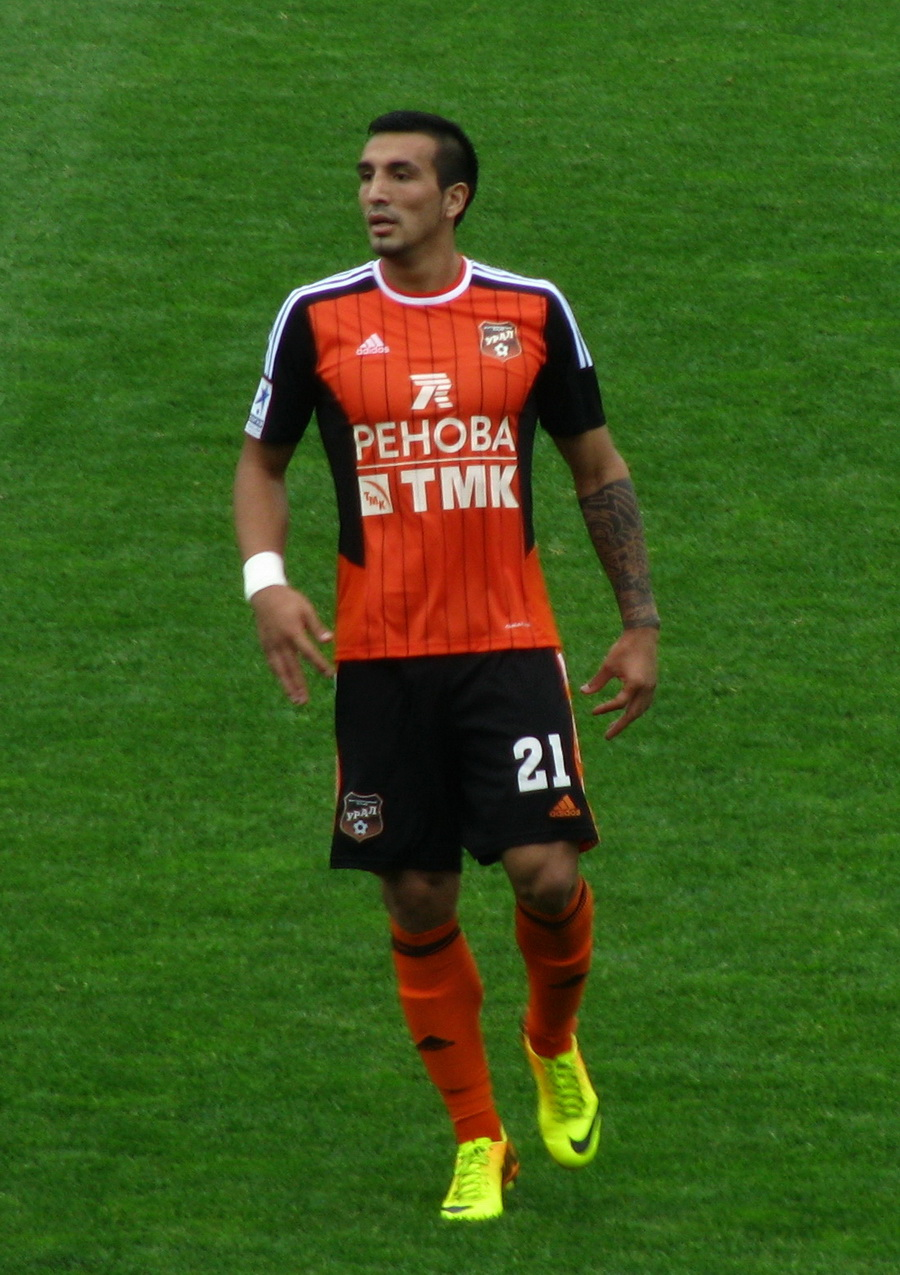
- Acevedo with FC Ural in 2013

Personal information
- Full name: Gerson Elías Acevedo Rojas
- Date of birth: April 5, 1988 (age 38)
- Place of birth: Santiago, Chile
- Height: 1.82 m (5 ft 11 1/2 in)
- Position: Midfielder

Youth career
- Colo-Colo

Senior career*
Years	Team	Apps	(Gls)
2006–2008	Colo-Colo	6	(0)
2007	→ Unión Española (loan)	14	(0)
2008	→ Deportes Puerto Montt (loan)	0	(0)
2008	→ Deportes Antofagasta (loan)	10	(0)
2009	Deportes Puerto Montt	0	(0)
2010	Ural	32	(2)
2011–2012	Mordovia Saransk	43	(3)
2012–2016	Ural	87	(19)
2016–2017	Kairat	11	(2)
2017	Deportes Iquique	1	(0)
2018	Sūduva	25	(10)
2019	Alashkert	2	(0)
2020–2021	Deportes Recoleta	9	(3)
2024	Real San Joaquín	1	(0)

International career
2004–2005	Chile U17		
2007–2008	Chile U20	6	(1)
2011	Chile	1	(0)
- * Club domestic league appearances and goals as of 11 March 2023

Gerson Elías Acevedo Rojas (born April 5, 1988) is a Chilean footballer who plays as a midfielder.

== Career ==
=== Club ===
Acevedo made his professional debut in 2006 for Colo-Colo. Whilst playing for Mordovia, Acevedo won the 2011-12 Football Championship of the National League. On 12 June 2016, Acevedo signed a two-year contract with Kazakhstan Premier League side FC Kairat.

On 10 August 2017, Acevedo left Deportes Iquique.

On 3 March 2019, Acevedo signed for Alashkert.

On 11 March 2020, Deportes Recoleta announced the signing of Acevedo.

After retiring for three years between 2021 and 2023, he signed with Real San Joaquín in the Segunda División Profesional de Chile for the 2024 season.

=== International ===
Acevedo has represented Chile internationally at the national U-17 team and national U-20 team levels.

== Career statistics ==
=== Club ===
As of match played 19 November 2016

Appearances and goals by club, season and competition
Club	Season	League			National Cup		Continental		Other		Total	
Club	Season	Division	Apps	Goals	Apps	Goals	Apps	Goals	Apps	Goals	Apps	Goals
Ural Sverdlovsk	2010	Russian First Division	32	2	1	0	–		–		33	2
Mordovia Saransk	2011–12	Russian National League	43	3	2	0	–		–		45	3
Ural Sverdlovsk	2012–13	Russian National League	20	5	1	0	-		-		0	0
Ural Sverdlovsk	2013–14	Russian Premier League	20	5	1	0	-		-		21	5
Ural Sverdlovsk	2014–15	Russian Premier League	23	3	1	0	-		2	0	26	3
Ural Sverdlovsk	2015–16	Russian Premier League	22	6	1	0	-		-		23	6
Ural Sverdlovsk	Total		85	19	4	0	-	-	2	0	91	19
Kairat	2016	Kazakhstan Premier League	11	2	2	1	3	0	–		16	3
Career total			171	26	9	1	3	0	2	0	185	27

== Honours ==
=== Club ===
Colo-Colo

- Primera División de Chile (2): 2007 Apertura, 2007 Clausura
