= Denis Fomin =

Russian football defender (born 1996)

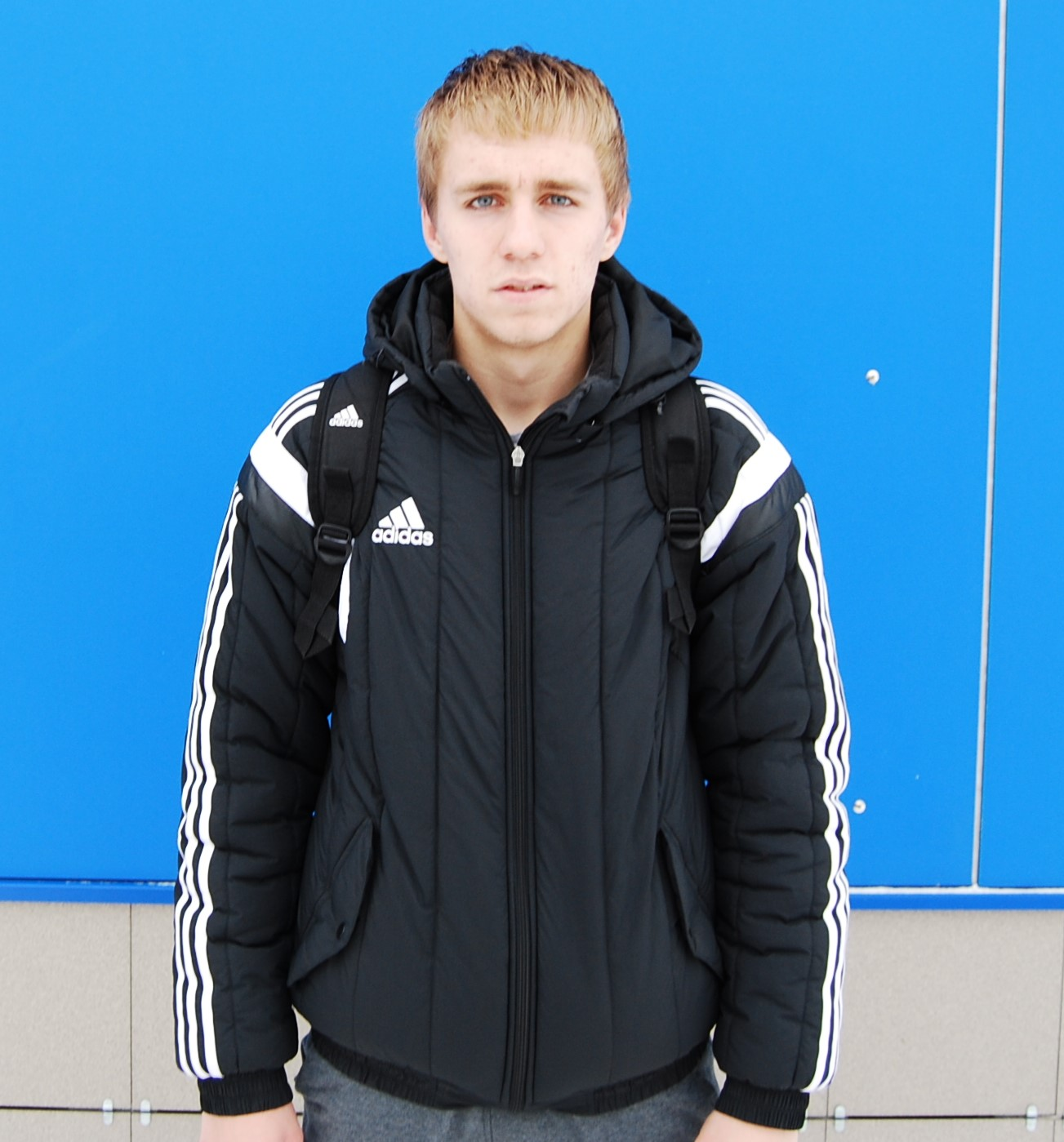

Personal information
- Full name: Denis Aleksandrovich Fomin
- Date of birth: 3 May 1996 (age 30)
- Place of birth: Lisakovsk, Kazakhstan
- Height: 1.85 m (6 ft 1 in)
- Position: Defender

Team information
- Current team: FC SKA-Khabarovsk
- Number: 17

Senior career*
Years	Team	Apps	(Gls)
2013–2014	FC Tekstilshchik Ivanovo	54	(0)
2015–2018	FC Ural Yekaterinburg	4	(0)
2016	→ FC Tekstilshchik Ivanovo (loan)	10	(1)
2016	→ FC Tambov (loan)	0	(0)
2016–2018	→ FC Tekstilshchik Ivanovo (loan)	39	(4)
2018–2021	FC Tekstilshchik Ivanovo	77	(6)
2021–2023	FC SKA-Khabarovsk	67	(4)
2023–2025	FC Chernomorets Novorossiysk	50	(2)
2025–2026	Rotor Volgograd	18	(0)
2026–	FC SKA-Khabarovsk	0	(0)

International career
2015	Russia U21	3	(0)
- * Club domestic league appearances and goals as of 16 May 2026

Denis Aleksandrovich Fomin (Russian: Дени́с Алекса́ндрович Фоми́н; born 3 May 1996) is a Russian football defender who plays for FC SKA-Khabarovsk.

== Club career ==
He made his debut in the Russian Second Division for FC Tekstilshchik Ivanovo on 20 April 2013 in a game against FC Znamya Truda Orekhovo-Zuyevo.

He made his Russian Premier League debut on 7 March 2015 for FC Ural Yekaterinburg in a game against FC Zenit Saint Petersburg.
