= Georgi Nurov =

Russian footballer

Personal information
- Full name: Georgi Valeryevich Nurov
- Date of birth: 8 June 1992 (age 34)
- Place of birth: Moscow, Russian SFSR
- Height: 1.79 m (5 ft 10 in)
- Position: Forward

Senior career*
Years	Team	Apps	(Gls)
2008–2011	FC Lokomotiv Moscow	1	(0)
2012–2014	FC Rubin Kazan	6	(0)
2012–2013	→ FC Neftekhimik Nizhnekamsk (loan)	49	(7)
2014–2016	FC Ural Sverdlovsk Oblast	2	(0)
2015	→ FC Baltika Kaliningrad (loan)	6	(0)
2015	→ FC Tom Tomsk (loan)	11	(1)
2017	Patro Eisden	2	(0)
2017–2018	FC Veles Moscow	16	(4)
2018–2019	FC Urozhay Krasnodar	14	(1)

International career
2010–2013	Russia U-19	3	(2)
2013	Russia U-21	3	(1)
- * Club domestic league appearances and goals

Georgi Valeryevich Nurov (Russian: Георгий Валерьевич Нуров; born 8 June 1992) is a Russian former football forward.

== Club career ==
He made his debut in the Russian Premier League for FC Lokomotiv Moscow on 6 November 2011 in a game against PFC CSKA Moscow.

In February 2017, he joined a third-tier Belgian club Patro Eisden.
