= Economic consequences of the Russo-Ukrainian war (2022–present) =

Financial crisis beginning after the invasion of Ukraine and subsequent sanctions

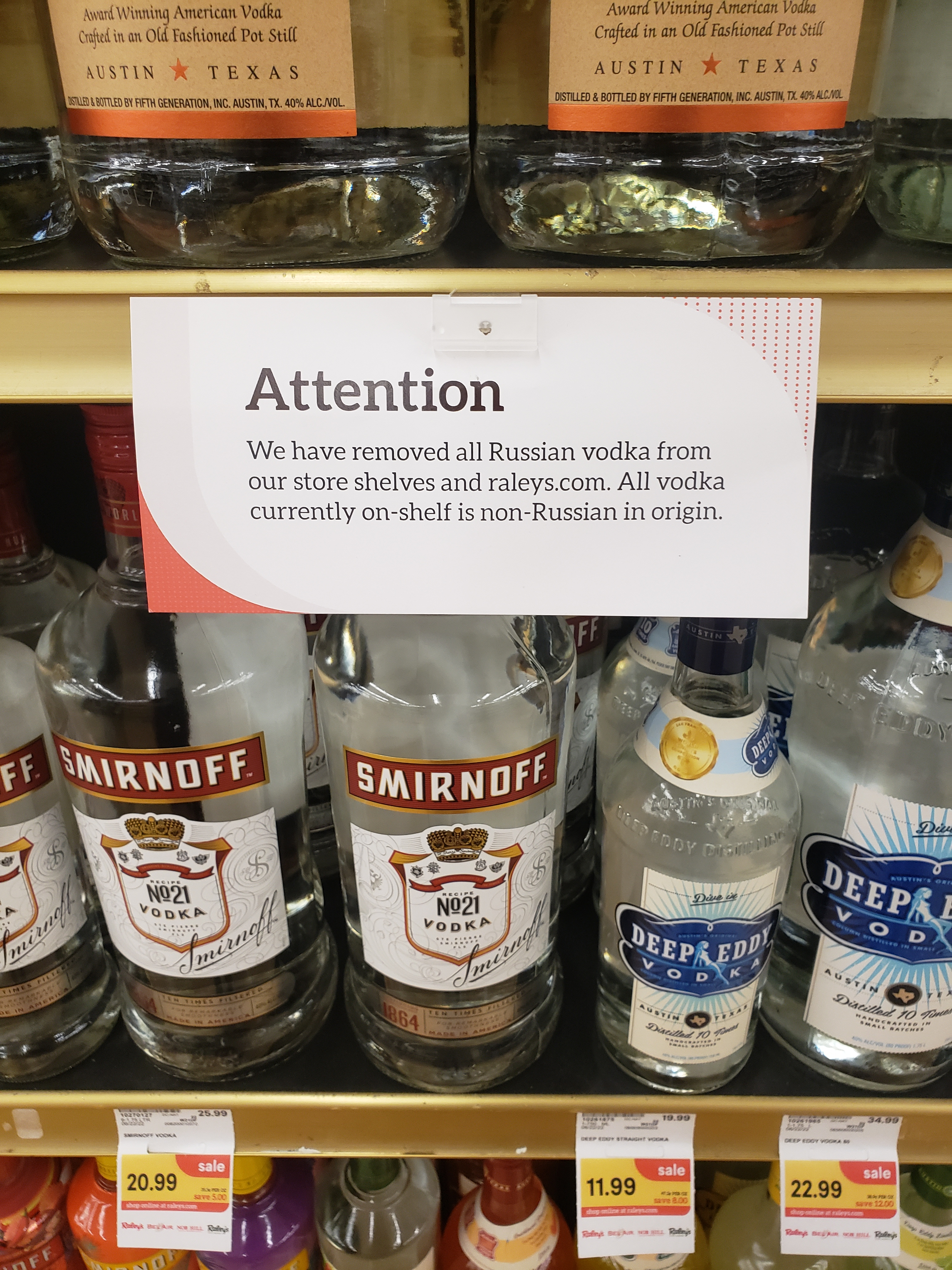
A grocery store in California, June 2022. Many retailers around the world removed Russian-made products from their inventories due to the invasion, either voluntarily or as a result of sanctions.

The economic consequences of the Russo-Ukrainian war (2022–present) began in late February 2022, in the days after Russia recognized two breakaway Ukrainian republics and launched an invasion of Ukraine. The subsequent economic sanctions have targeted large parts of the Russian economy, Russian oligarchs, and members of the Russian government. Russia responded in kind. A wave of protests and strikes occurred across Europe against the rising cost of living.

The war in Ukraine has also resulted in significant loss of human capital, destruction of agricultural trading infrastructure, huge damage to production capacity, including through the loss of electricity, and a reduction in private consumption of more than a third relative to pre-war levels.

== Background ==
Beginning in 2014, Russia has been facing sanctions over its annexation of Crimea which have stunted the nation's economic growth. In 2020, the COVID-19 recession and the oil price war with Saudi Arabia also affected the Russian economy. Additional sanctions occurred in the lead-up to the invasion in 2021. The Russian stock market declined by twenty percent during the military buildup.

== History of economic consequences ==
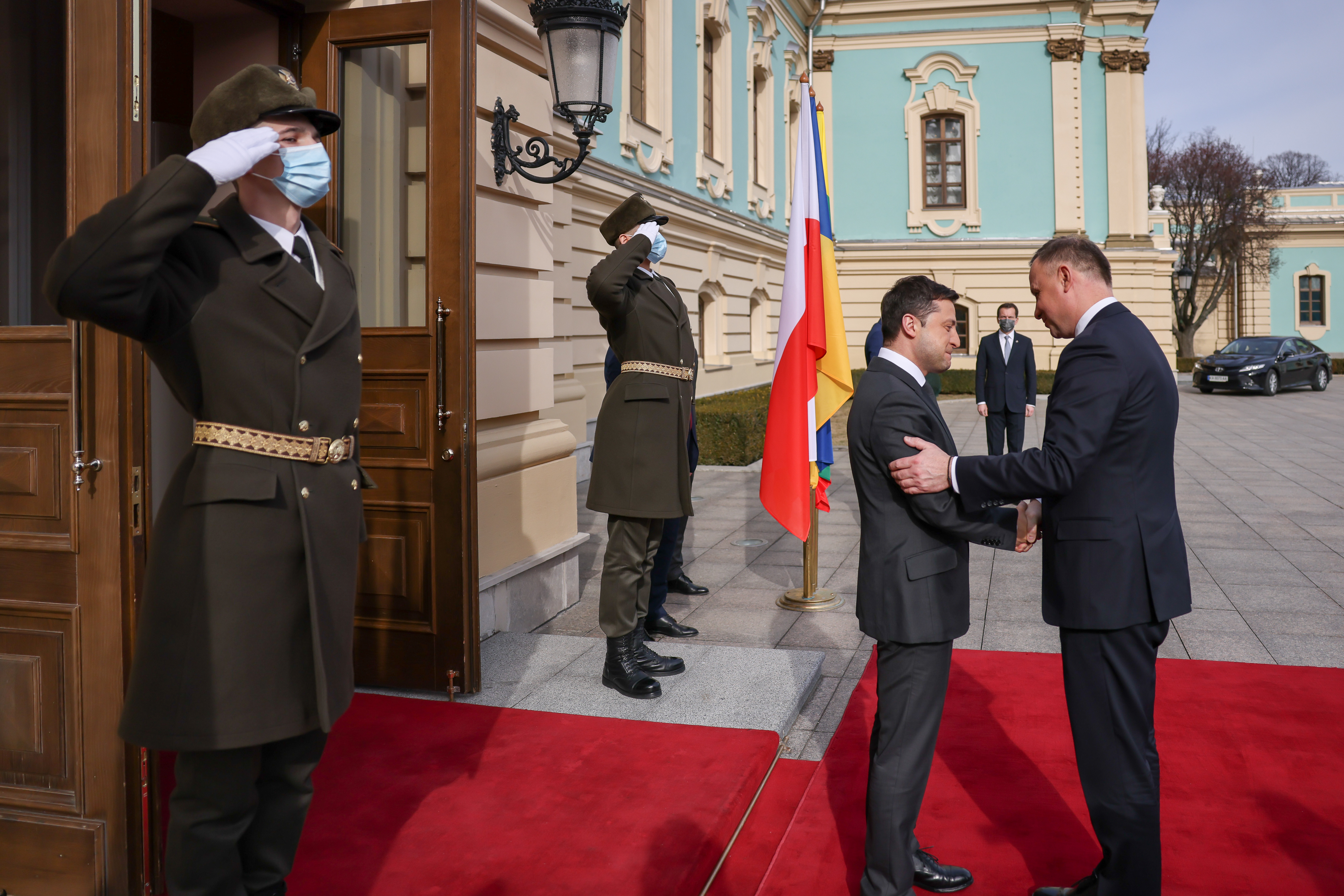
President of Poland Andrzej Duda during his visit in Kyiv twelve hours before the invasion (23 February 2022)

Kristalina Georgieva, the managing director of the International Monetary Fund (IMF), warned that the conflict posed a substantial economic risk for the region and internationally. She added that the IMF could help other countries affected by the conflict, complementary to a $2.2 billion loan package being prepared to assist Ukraine. David Malpass, the president of the World Bank Group, said that the conflict would have far-reaching economic and social effects, and reported that the bank was preparing options for significant economic and fiscal support to Ukrainians and the region.

Despite unprecedented international sanctions against Russia, payments for energy and raw materials were largely spared from these measures, as were food supplies because of the potential consequences on world food prices. Russia and Ukraine are major producers of wheat that is exported through the Bosporus to Mediterranean and North African countries. The expulsion of some Russian banks from SWIFT is expected to affect the country's exports. Since Russia is the largest trading and economic partner for post-Soviet states in Central Asia and a major destination for millions of CIS's migrant workers, Central Asia has been particularly hard hit by sanctions against Russia.

Sanctions also included asset freezes on the Russian Central Bank, which holds $630 billion in foreign-exchange reserves, to prevent it from offsetting the ramifications of sanctions. On 5 May, President of the European Council Charles Michel said: "I am absolutely convinced that this is extremely important not only to freeze assets but also to make possible to confiscate it, to make it available for the rebuilding of Ukraine".

=== Russia ===
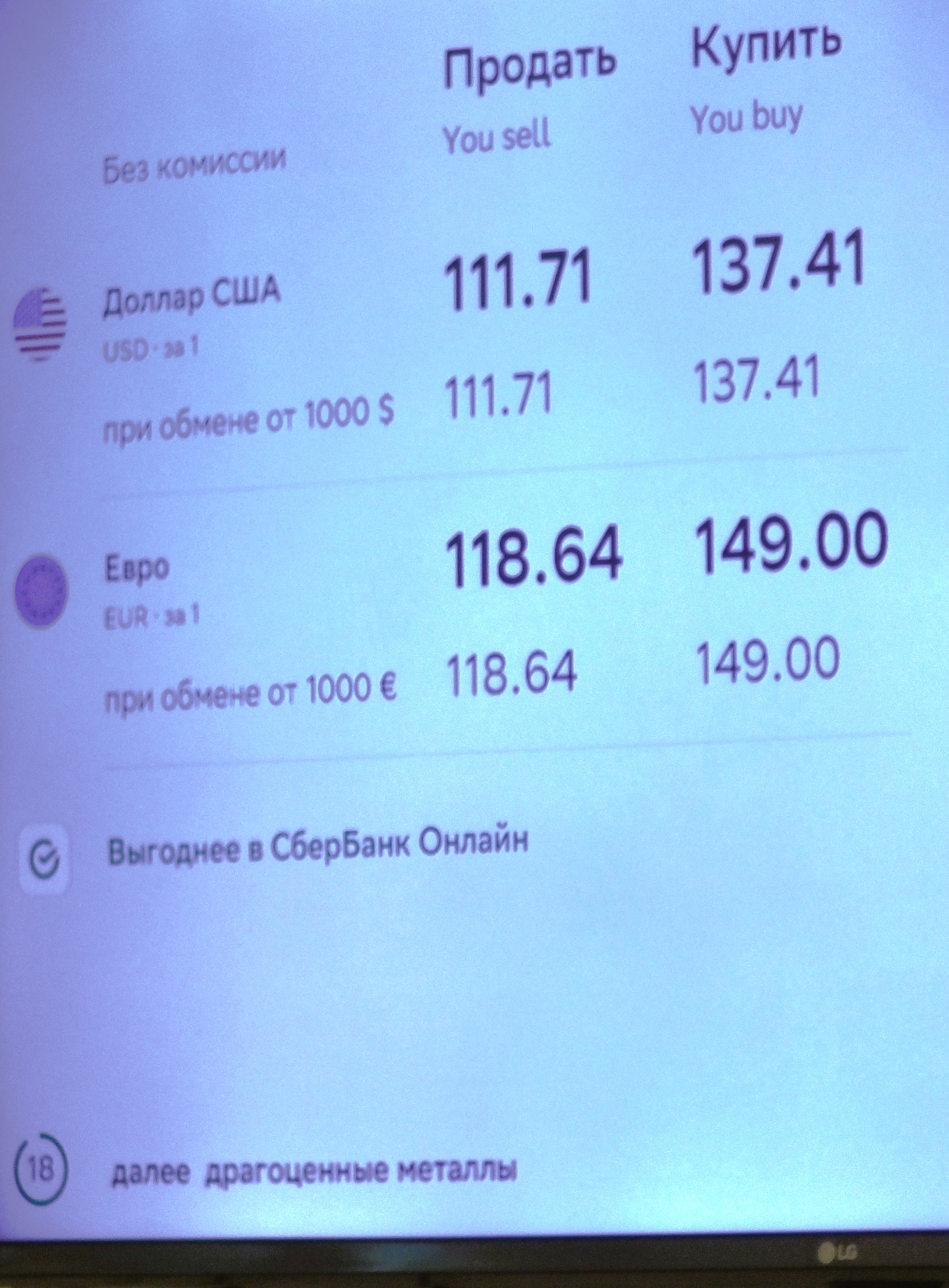
US dollar and euro exchange rates on 4 March at a Sberbank branch in Moscow

Economic sanctions affected Russia from the first day of the invasion, with the stock market falling by up to 39% (RTS Index). The Russian ruble fell to record lows, as Russians rushed to exchange currency. Stock exchanges in Moscow and St. Petersburg were suspended until at least 18 March, making it the longest closure in Russia's history. On 26 February, S&P Global Ratings downgraded the Russian government's credit rating to "junk", causing funds that require investment-grade bonds to dump Russian debt, making further borrowing very difficult for Russia.

The Central Bank of Russia announced interventions, its first since the 2014 annexation of Crimea, to stabilise the market. On 28 February, it raised interest rates to 20% and banned foreigners from selling local securities. According to a former deputy chairman of the Russian central bank, the sanctions put the Russian National Wealth Fund at risk of disappearing. With the value of the Russian ruble and the share prices for Russian equities falling on major exchanges, the Moscow Exchange was closed for a day, which was afterwards extended to over a week. As of 28 February, the price of Russia's credit default swaps signalled about a 56% chance of default. Fitch Ratings feared that Russia would imminently default on its debts.

Countries that have banned Russian aircraft from their airspace. Flight bans placed on Russian aircraft and Russia's retaliatory measures have changed global airline routes.

On 27 February, BP, one of the world's seven largest oil and gas companies and the single largest foreign investor in Russia, announced it was divesting from Rosneft. The Rosneft interest comprised about half of BP's oil and gas reserves and a third of its production. The divestment was projected to cost the company up to $25 billion, and analysts noted that it was unlikely that BP would be able to recover anywhere near the value of Rosneft. The same day, the Government Pension Fund of Norway, the world's largest sovereign wealth fund, announced that it would divest itself from its Russian assets. The fund owned about 25 billion Norwegian krone ($2.83 billion) in Russian company shares and government bonds.

On 28 February, Shell also announced that it would be pulling its investments in Russia. On 1 March, the Italian energy company Eni announced that it would cancel its investments into the Blue Stream pipeline. The same day, the world's largest shipping companies, Maersk and Mediterranean Shipping Company, suspended all container shipments to Russia, excluding foodstuffs, medical, and humanitarian supplies.

Russia is reportedly experiencing brain drain due to mass emigration of more than 300,000 mainly younger Russians, many of whom are tech industry professionals, to countries like Armenia, Georgia, and Turkey. More than 50,000 Russian information technology specialists have left Russia. In response to sanctions in the entertainment industry, Russia is considering the legalisation of software piracy.

Cyberattacks by unidentified global hackers have also been a problem for Russia. For example, a hacking of the Russian Federal Air Transport Agency, Rosaviatsia, in late March 2022 resulted in massive disruption and the agency switching back to the use of paper document flow and postal mail. Due to budget limitations, Rosaviatsia did not have the necessary backups of the hacked data.

On 11 April, Russian Railways defaulted on 268 million dollars of bonds after failing to make payments on a Swiss franc bond.

In late July 2022, the IMF upgraded Russia's GDP estimate by 2.5%, but some economists see a long-term problem for the Russian economy, and explain its resilience only by a short-term increase of energy prices. Russia was able to leverage its economic power by cutting gas supplies to Europe, and play up its agricultural might as the largest wheat exporter globally. By August 2022, Russia was selling almost as much oil as before its invasion of Ukraine. Sales to the Middle East and Asia helped make up for declining exports to Europe, and due to the higher price, Moscow revenues were $20 billion monthly compared to $14.6 billion a year before (2021).

Despite international sanctions during the Russo-Ukrainian War, Russian energy sales have increased in value, and its exports have expanded with new financing options and payment methods for international buyers. At the same time, the Russian budget had a record deficit of 1.45 trillion rubles by August, mostly due to collapse of tax income from fossil fuel exports from 70 billion down to 33.7 billion rubles per month, with total reduction of monthly budget incomes by 10%. In September, the Russian Ministry of Finance notified all public sectors of a reduction in spending by 10%.

Some estimates suggest that reconstruction of the war-torn annexed territories would cost Russia between $100 and $200 billion. The reconstruction of Mariupol alone will likely cost more than $14 billion. A state budget published on 29 September by the Kremlin revealed that 3.3 billion roubles (about US$59 million) had been set aside to rebuild the regions.

In November 2022 it was reported that Russia had officially entered a recession as the Federal State Statistics Service had reported a national GDP loss for the second consecutive quarter.

According to most estimates, every day of the war in Ukraine costs Russia $500 million to $1 billion.

Russia faced a record shortage of factory workers in July 2023, with more than 43% of industrial enterprises facing a shortage, up from 35% in April.

Some Western journalists expressed an opinion that international sanctions did not harm Russian economy and even quite the opposite, they allowed Russian groups to acquire assets of Western companies withdrawing from Russia. This has been clarified by Forbes economists who explained that over 1000 companies withdrawn from Russia and while they were forced to sell their assets at 50% discount, these losses make 1-2% of their global revenues. Russian government itself declared it "prefers the companies remains in Russia" as such a large withdrawal massively harmed investor confidence and drastically reduced performance of the markets from which the Western companies have withdrawn. As result, the value of the assets acquired by Russian government has collapsed instantly. Valuation of Russian state-owned companies has collapsed even more, with Gazprom losing 75% of its value. The tax income Russian government receives from foreign companies also decreased by 75%. Numerous sectors of Russian economy collapsed by as much as 90%, energy export revenues dropped by 50%.

According to economist Sergey Guriev, Russian economy after 2022 has practically split into two parallel ones: the military economy, that runs on orders placed by the government with the military industries and payments to soldiers, which has observed growth; and the civilian sector that heavily suffers from high inflation, price increases, underemployment and high credit rates. High growth in the military economy results in the macroeconomic indicators biased towards the defense orders, so the collapse of civilian production by 10% was not reflected in the GDP.

A 2024 analyst for the Carnegie Endowment for International Peace found that the consequences has been different among classes. While the Russian middle class has been shocked, blue-collar workers have had salary rises beyond inflation. There increases have been reflected in a rise of tax income from regions traditionally net receivers such as the republic of Chuvashia. Russians have directed these funds to higher savings, incited by high interest rates, and to consumption such as gambling and down payments for subsidized mortgages. The study cites the salary of weavers, 18,000–25,000 rubles in December 2021 (about $250–350) and 120,000 rubles ($1,300) in 2024. A courier can earn as much as a member of the Russian Academy of Sciences. These classes thus, more influenced by propaganda, have a good opinion of the Russian regime.

A report published in April 2025 by the Stockholm Institute of Transition Economics (SITE), part of the Stockholm School of Economics, noted that official Russian statistics are unreliable and opaque, and "serves to bolster the domestic narrative of economic resilience and questions the effectiveness of sanctions while masking underlying fragilities". The report, which was presented to the finance ministers of the EU at a meeting of the Economic and Financial Affairs Council on 13 May 2025, also argued that Russian fiscal stimulus has kept the economy afloat so far, but that it is on an unsustainable trajectory. "Even under optimistic growth scenarios, Russia's economic scale remains insufficient to match its Western adversaries' capacity in a sustained geopolitical rivalry", the report concluded.

=== Ukraine ===
The National Bank of Ukraine suspended currency markets, announcing that it would fix the official exchange rate. The central bank also limited cash withdrawals to ₴100,000 per day and prohibited withdrawal in foreign currencies by members of the general public. The PFTS Ukraine Stock Exchange stated on 24 February that trading was suspended due to the emergency events. On 10 April 2022, Bloomberg News service reported that the Ukrainian economic growth for 2022 is likely to suffer a sharp decline estimated at a 45% decrease in annual performance as a result of the Russian invasion. On 21 July 2022, the National Bank of Ukraine devalued the hryvnia by 25%.

Following the onset of the Russian-Ukrainian War in 2022, Ukraine's GDP declined by nearly 30%. Despite economic growth in 2023 and 2024, the economy remains smaller than it was before the war. In 2023, GDP increased by 5.3%, and in 2024 by 3.6%. The International Monetary Fund forecasts that Ukraine's GDP growth will slow to between 2% and 3% in 2025, citing challenges such as labor shortages, damage to energy infrastructure, and the ongoing war.

In April 2026, the National Bank of Ukraine forecast that real GDP growth in 2026 would be 1.3% and inflation 9.4%; it kept its bank rate at 15%. Due to heavy economic dependance on external donors, such as the United States, the IMF, and the European Union, Ukrainian economist and banker Kyrylo Shevchenko coined the term donornomics to describe the economic model of the country during the Russo-Ukrainian War. The Kyiv Post stated that the Western economies were financing Ukraine through the war by about $100 billion a year. In July 2026, Ukraine and Russia started attacking each other's ports and shipping using those ports in the Sea of Azov and Black Sea, which had been largely protected by the Black Sea Grain Initiative agreement, leading to the closure of the Ukrainian deep-water ports near Odesa on 23 July majorly impacting exports. In August 2026, President Zelenskyy asked allies for an additional €23 billion of funding for a military spending shortfall.

=== Belarus ===
The value of Belarusian dollar denominated bonds due in 2027 fell to a record low of 6.5 cents from 88 cents prior to the invasion.

=== Armenia ===
The consequences of the conflict had both positive and negative effects on the economy of Armenia. One of the negative effects of the war was that due to the influx of Russian migrants, the prices of the apartments in the center of Yerevan increased sharply on average 109,000 AMD per square. If before the war people could rent an apartment in the center of the capital (two-rooms and furnished to be more specific) for 500 Euros, in 2022 during the war the price has risen 50%.

Another negative effect of the Russian migrants who came to Armenia was the appreciation of AMD. According to Google Finance, the exchange rate of dollar to dram was less than 400 AMD (395.2915 AMD more precise). The problems with the appreciation of the dram is that when Russians came into Armenia, they fueled the demand for dram and this, combined with the fact that the exchange rate of the USD decreased, the appreciation of the AMD made the products being exported to other countries less competitive.

The IT sphere was also affected, the fact partly also connected with the appreciation of AMD. The number of Russian IT workers in Armenia increased, creating a competition amongst local IT workers and Russians. While that led to a higher supply of labor in the IT sphere, the competition created by it caused local Armenian IT workers to leave their jobs or to work as freelancers, which means that they may work for another non-Armenian company and pay less taxes to the Armenian Government.

During the Fall of 2022 Armenia also faced an aggression by the Azerbaijani armed forces. The National Statistical Committee (NSC) issued official data that showed Armenia's GDP increased by 14.8% over the previous year during the third quarter. Economy Minister wrote "The economy has recovered quickly after the September shock". Information and communication sectors had the largest growth of 59.2% when compared to the same time in 2021; financial and insurance sectors expanded by 57.3%; and transportation and warehousing sectors rose by 41.3%. Wholesale and retail trade, auto and motorcycle repair (20%), building (19.9%), manufacturing (18%), administration and related sectors (16.2%), and lodging and catering (12.8%) also recorded high growth rates. The Armenian government forecasts their economy will grow by 7%, while inflation is projected at 4% (± 1.5%).

The World Bank's report released Sunday provides further details and numbers. In that report the World Bank revised its projection for Armenia's economic growth in 2022 from 5.3% to 1.2%, noting that "the impact of Russia's invasion of Ukraine on Armenia's economy is likely to be notably negative, but the scale remains undetermined." Sanctions and boycotts imposed by the European Union and the United States have harmed Armenia as Russia is a significant economic and investment partner for Armenia, accounting for around a third of recent exports and imports. Russian firms accounted for more than 40% of Armenia's "net foreign direct investment stock" in the previous year. Remittances from Russia contribute for 5% of Armenia's GDP, and 40% of all tourists last year came from that country.

Further, Russia has a major influence over several of Armenia's important economic sectors, or even holds monopolies in some of them particularly in the areas of energy, minerals, and food. The World Bank report states that Russia is the source of all of Armenia's imports of wheat and gas. Remittances, trade, and investment are projected to suffer significantly in Armenia as a result of the Russian financial crisis and the ensuing collapse of the ruble. The price of food and other essentials has increased for Armenians due to global inflationary forces. With Armenia still battling to recover from the twin effects of a pandemic and a severe military defeat to Azerbaijan in 2020, the predicted economic damage from the conflict in Ukraine comes at a bad time for Armenia.

=== Commodities ===
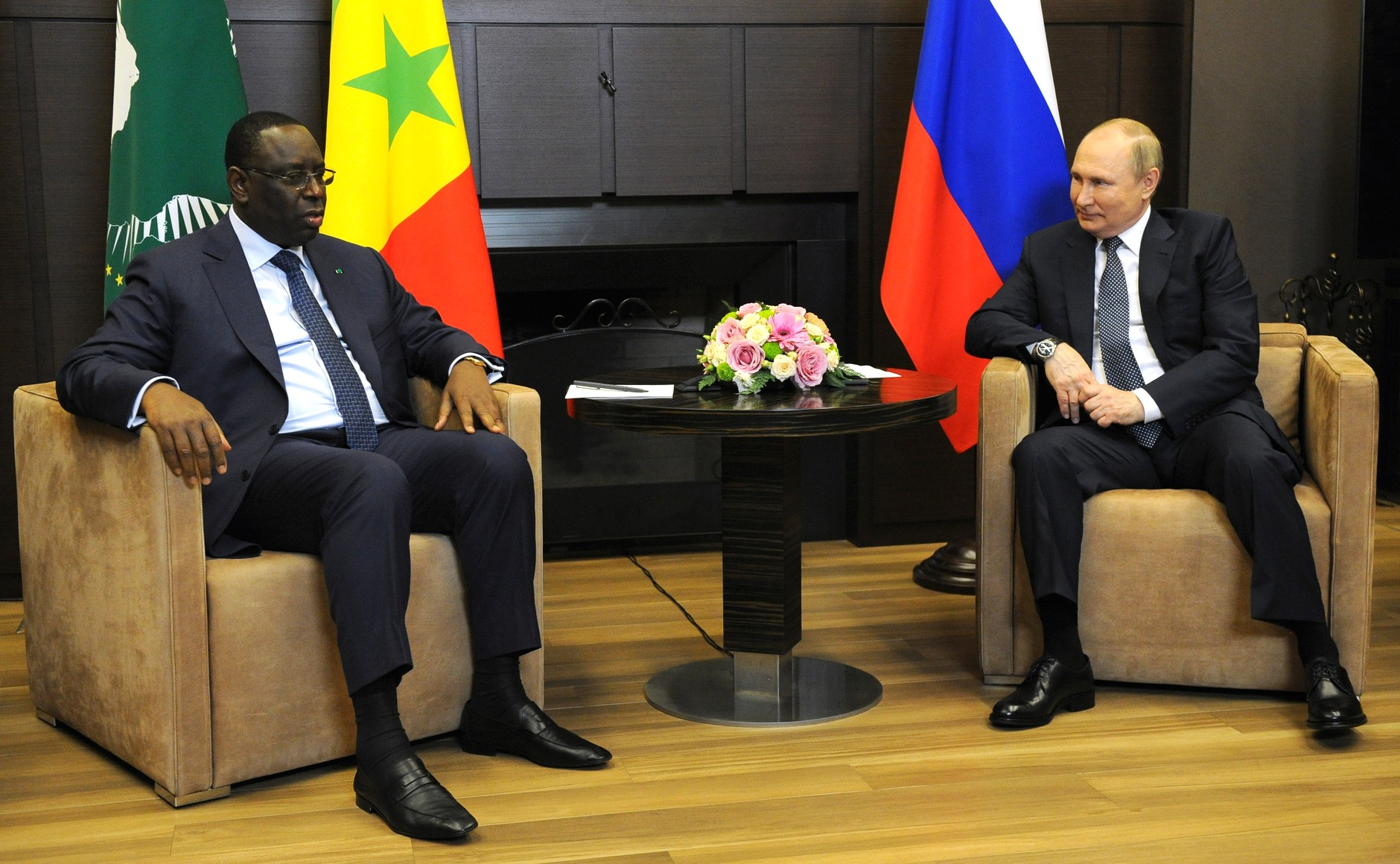
Vladimir Putin meets the President of the African Union, Macky Sall, in Sochi to discuss grain deliveries from Russia and Ukraine to Africa, 3 June 2022

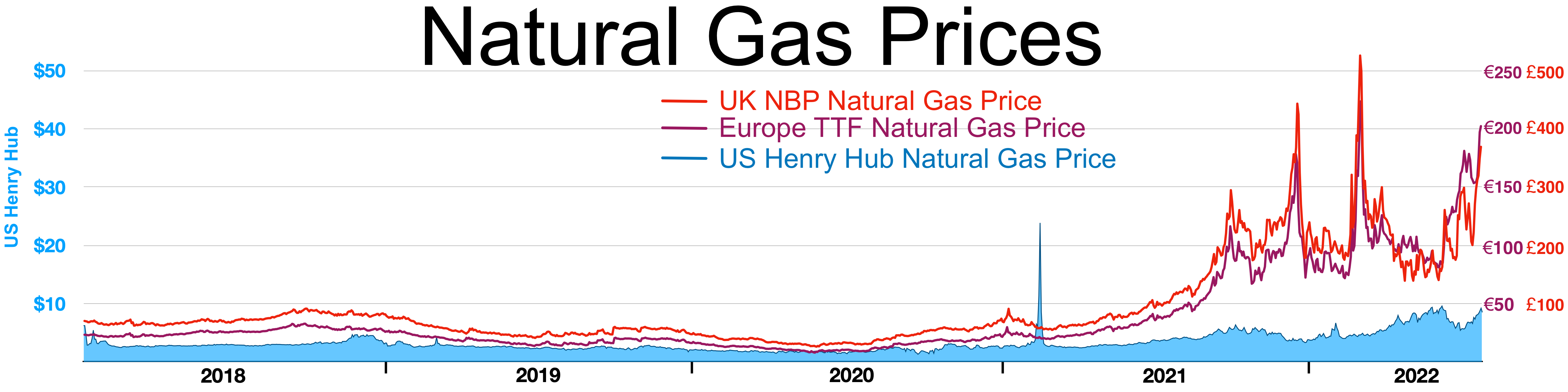
Natural gas prices in Europe and United States National Balancing Point NBP (UK) natural gas prices Europe TTF natural gas prices United States Henry Hub natural gas prices

Russia is the world's largest exporter of grains, natural gas, and fertilisers, and among the world's largest suppliers of crude oil and metals, including palladium, platinum, gold, cobalt, nickel, and aluminium. The invasion threatened the energy supply from Russia to Europe, with natural gas prices in Europe reaching an all-time high of $3,700 per thousand cubic meters on 7 March at ICE Futures, and Brent oil prices rising above $130 a barrel for the first time since 2008. This caused European countries to seek to diversify their energy supply routes. On 7 March, German chancellor Olaf Scholz and other European leaders pushed back against the call by the US and Ukraine to ban imports of Russian gas and oil because "Europe's supply of energy for heat generation, mobility, power supply and industry cannot be secured in any other way". However, the EU indicated that it would cut its gas dependency on Russia by two-thirds in 2022.

At the time of the invasion, Ukraine was the fourth-largest exporter of corn and wheat, and the world's largest exporter of sunflower oil, with Russia and Ukraine together responsible for 29% of the world's wheat exports and 75% of world sunflower oil exports, roughly 12% of globally traded calories in 2021. On 25 February, the benchmark Chicago Board of Trade March wheat futures contracts reached their highest price since 2012, with the prices of corn and soybean also spiking. The head of the World Food Programme, David Beasley, warned in March that the war in Ukraine could take the global food crisis to "levels beyond anything we've seen before". A potential disruption to global wheat supplies could exacerbate the ongoing hunger crisis in Yemen, Afghanistan and East Africa. The war, amplified by multiple extreme weather events, marked a second major global shock to food markets, disrupting trade routes, amplifying uncertainty, and reinforcing inflationary pressures set in motion by the COVID 19 pandemic. Hostilities in the Black Sea region, along with additional disruptions in the Red Sea, curtailed exports of grains and fertilizers, particularly affecting low income countries and middle-income countries reliant on global cereal markets.

The supply of neon, needed for chip manufacture and lasers, was also severely constrained by the conflict. Ukraine produces about 70% of the global neon supply, and 90% of the semiconductor-grade neon used in the United States. The two largest suppliers in Ukraine, which together account for half of global neon production, were shuttered after the conflict broke out. The supply of krypton and xenon, of which Ukraine is also a major exporter, was affected as well. On 31 March, in apparent retaliation against Western economic sanctions, Putin announced that Russia would stop supplying gas to Europe that was not paid for in rubles.

In April 2022, the World Bank said that the conflict led to cost-push inflation as it caused the world to experience the largest commodity shock in 50 years, pointing out that the price hikes caused severe damage to the economy and consumers. According to their report, energy prices would increase at least 50 percent in 2022 and an increase in food prices was the largest since 2008. The report also said the inflation would continue till the end of 2024.

On 26 April, Gazprom announced that gas supplies to Poland and Bulgaria would halt.

In April 2022, Russia supplied 45% of EU's gas imports, earning $900 million a day. In the first two months after Russia invaded Ukraine, Russia earned $66.5 billion from fossil fuel exports, and the EU accounted for 71% of that trade. The European Commission and International Energy Agency presented joint plans to reduce reliance on Russian energy, reduce Russian gas imports by two thirds within a year, and completely by 2030.

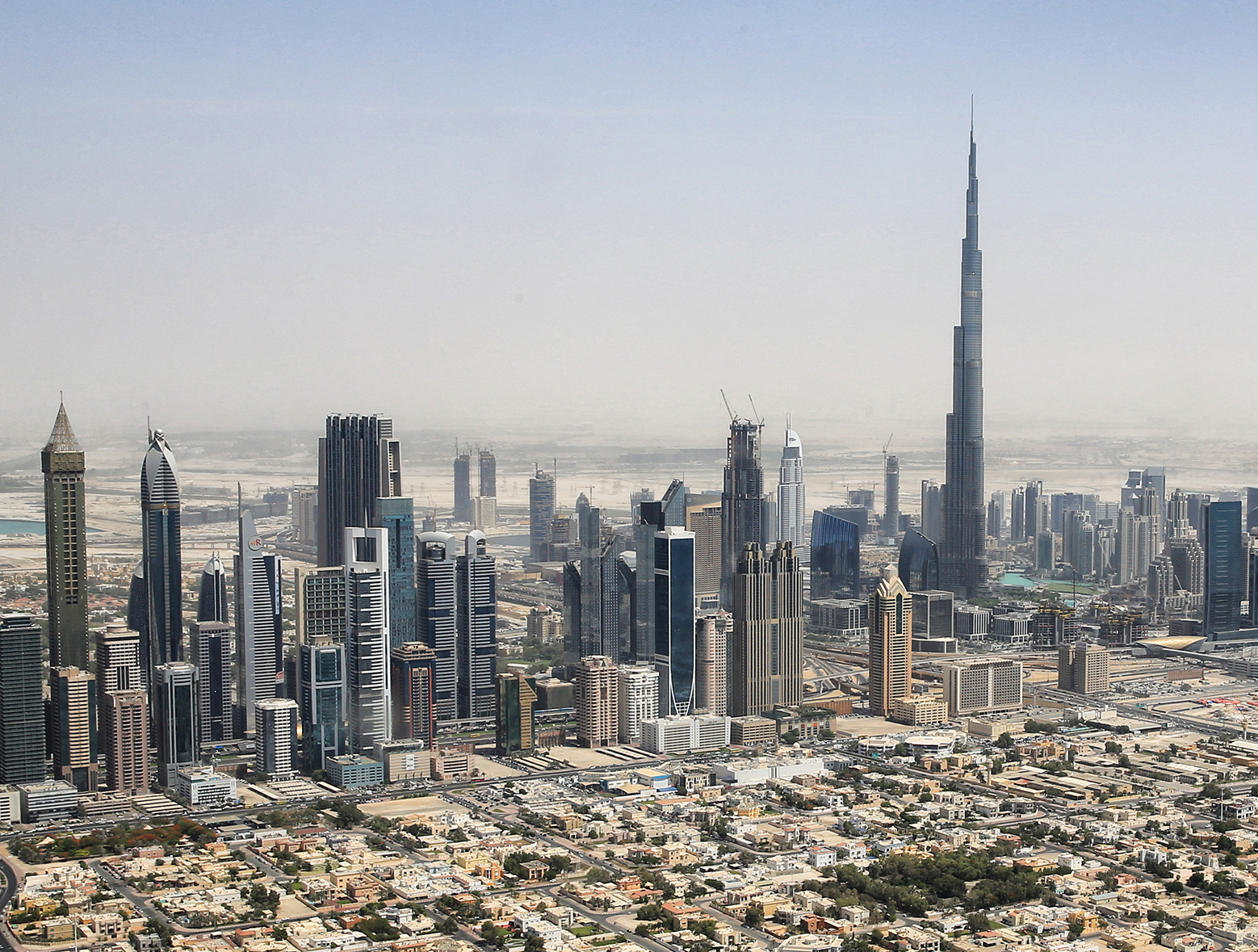
Russian commodities traders relocated from Switzerland to Dubai.

In May 2022, the European Commission proposed and approved a partial ban on oil imports from Russia, part of the economic response to the Russian invasion of Ukraine. On 18 May 2022, the European Union published plans to end its reliance on Russian oil, natural gas and coal by 2027. In June 2022, the United States government agreed to allow Italian company Eni and Spanish company Repsol to import oil from Venezuela to Europe to replace oil imports from Russia. France negotiated with the United Arab Emirates to replace some Russian oil imports.

In June 2022, the European Union, Egypt and Israel signed a natural gas agreement becoming part of a trilateral deal. The memorandum of understanding was announced by European commission president Ursula von der Leyen. However, the deal faced a few roadblocks like Green's Mounir Satouri, the European parliament's lead MEP on Egypt threw light on EU's relations with the latter in a letter written to von der Leyen, highlighting its dismal human rights record.

As part of the sanctions imposed on Russia, on 2 September 2022, the finance ministers of the G7 group agreed to cap the price of Russian oil and petroleum products in an effort intended to reduce Russia's ability to finance its war on Ukraine.

In Q1 2023 Russian exports of Gas to the EU had fallen to 5.9Bcm, roughly the same as gas exports to China, this combined with a fall in gas prices, is depriving Russia of export revenue.

== Effects on markets and economies ==
The 2022 attacks and the subsequent economic sanctions had severe effects on the Russian and Ukrainian economies, and decreased supply to some worldwide markets.

=== Cost of food and crops ===
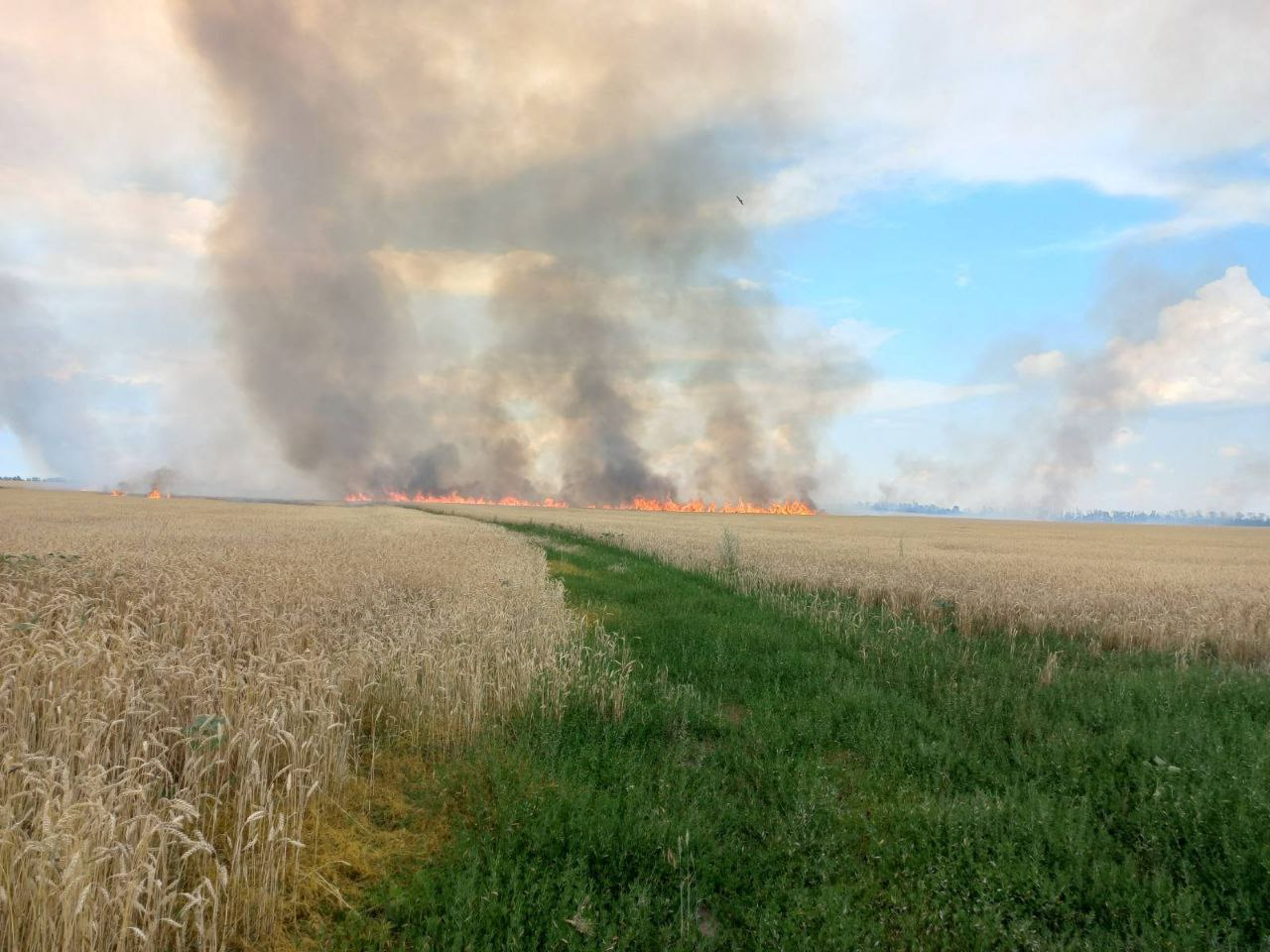
A burning wheat field near Andriivka, Kharkiv Oblast after Russian shelling on 5 July 2022

Wheat prices surged to their highest prices since 2008 in response to the 2022 attacks. Ukraine accounted for 10% of global wheat exports. At the time of the invasion, Ukraine was the fourth-largest exporter of corn and wheat, and the world's largest exporter of sunflower oil, with Russia and Ukraine together responsible for 27% of the world's wheat exports and 53% of the world's sunflowers and seeds. The head of the World Food Programme, David Beasley, warned in March that the war in Ukraine could take the global food crisis to "levels beyond anything we've seen before".

A potential disruption to global wheat supplies could exacerbate the ongoing hunger crisis in Yemen, Afghanistan and East Africa. The American Bakers Association president warned that the price of anything made with grain would begin rising as all the grain markets are interrelated. The chief agricultural economist for Wells Fargo stated that Ukraine will likely be severely limited in their ability to plant crops in spring 2022 and lose an agricultural year, while an embargo on Russian crops would create more inflation of food prices. Recovering crop production capabilities may take years even after fighting has stopped.

Surging wheat prices resulting from the conflict have strained African countries such as Egypt, which are highly dependent upon Russian and Ukrainian wheat exports, and have provoked fears of social unrest. At least 25 African countries import a third of their wheat from Russia and Ukraine, and 15 of them import more than half from those two countries. On 24 February, the Chinese government announced that it would drop all restrictions on Russian wheat as part of an agreement that had been reached earlier in February; the South China Morning Post called this a potential "lifeline" for the Russian economy.

On 4 March, the Food and Agriculture Organization (FAO) of the United Nations reported that the world Food Price Index reached an all-time high in February, posting a 24% year-over-year increase. Most of the data for the February report was compiled before the invasion, but analysts said a prolonged conflict could have a major effect on grain exports.

On 30 March, at a United Nations meeting, the United States Deputy Secretary of State Wendy Sherman stated that the 2022 Russian invasion of Ukraine, including the naval blockade of Ukraine's sea ports and armed attacks on civilian cargo ships, created a critical food shortage in Ukraine, with worldwide ramifications. In addition, potential food and fertiliser export difficulties encountered by the Russian Federation – the major exporter of potash, ammonia, urea and other soil nutrients – as a result of economic sanctions could jeopardise the food security of many countries.

Rising energy prices are also pushing agricultural costs higher, contributing to increasing food prices globally. The agriculture and food industries use energy for various purposes. Direct energy use includes electricity for automated water irrigation, fuel consumption for farm machinery and energy required at various stages of food processing, packaging, transportation and distribution. The use of pesticides and mineral fertilisers results in large quantities of indirect energy consumption, with these inputs being highly energy intensive to manufacture. While the share varies considerably between regions – depending on factors such as weather conditions and crop types – direct and non-direct energy costs can account for 40% to 50% of total variable costs of cropping in advanced economies such as the United States. Higher energy and fertiliser prices therefore inevitably translate into higher production costs, and ultimately into higher food prices.

In May 2022, the FAO estimated that "at least 20 percent of Ukraine's winter crops" "may not be harvested or planted". The food system-related environmental effects of the war may include long-term harm to Ukraine's soil.

==== Export agreements ====
The United Nations, Russia, Ukraine, and Turkey signed agreements on 22 July 2022, intended to secure exports via the Black Sea of grain from both countries and fertilizer from Russia, to ease shortages in developing countries. The next day, Russia fired missiles at the port city of Odesa, through which Ukrainian grain flows. On 7 September 2022, Putin announced his intent to revise the terms of the grain export agreement.

==== Management ====
Scientists cautioned that policy-makers should not abandon sustainable farming practices to increase grain production in response to resulting food insecurity, but change "the demand side which can [also] lead to both a more resilient and more sustainable global food system" – such as limiting the import of animal feed (e.g. as meat-production requires relatively large amounts of needed foods and of agricultural land) – and e.g. expanding wheat production in high-productivity areas. Possible major policy-based actions that could mitigate the energy and resource crises caused or exacerbated by the war could include demand-side focused measures, worded briefly as (facilitating people to) "grow more food and less fodder, drive and fly less, turn down the thermostat".

=== Energy and oil ===
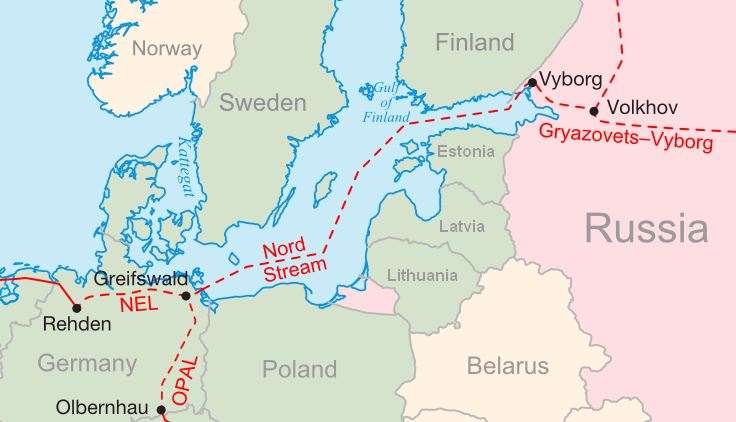
Nord Stream, a natural gas pipeline, running under the Baltic Sea, bypassing Ukraine. Germany imported 50% to 75% of its natural gas from Russia. Nord Stream 2 would have doubled the annual capacity of Nord Stream to 110 billion m^{3} (3.9 trillion cu ft) and thereby decreased the price.

Viewed in context, the price of oil has been affected internationally at the times of the COVID-19 pandemic, the 2022- Russo-Ukrainian war and the 2026 Iran war.

The retail price of gasoline in the US increased at the outbreak of war in Ukraine, but returned to pre-war levels in ensuing years.

The retail price of diesel fuel in the US increased at the outbreak of war in Ukraine, but slowly returned to pre-war levels.

In January 2022, Russia produced 11.3 million barrels per day (Mb/d) of crude oil and condensate, of which 10Mb/d was crude oil. This makes Russia the world's third largest producer of oil, surpassed only by the United States and Saudi Arabia (in the same period, they produced 17.6 Mb/d and 12 Mb/d, respectively). However, Russia is the largest exporter of oil products to global markets and the second largest exporter of crude, after Saudi Arabia. Russia exported 7.8 Mb/d in December 2021, including 5Mb/d of crude. Within the initial two weeks of the invasion, prices in global oil markets had surged by US$8 per barrel, pushing prices for Brent oil above $100 a barrel for the first time since 2014. On 27 February, BP, one of the world's seven largest oil and gas companies and the single largest foreign investor in Russia, announced it was divesting its 19.75% stake in Rosneft. The Rosneft interest comprises about half of BP's oil and gas reserves and a third of its production. The divestment may cost the company up to $25 billion and analysts noted that it was unlikely that BP would be able to recover a fraction of this cost. The same day, the Government Pension Fund of Norway, the world's largest sovereign wealth fund, announced that it would freeze investment in Russia and divest its Russian assets. Before the invasion, the fund owned about 25 billion Norwegian krone ($2.83 billion) in Russian company shares and government bonds.

On 28 February, as a result of the invasion, the Government of Canada announced a ban on Russian crude oil imports to Canada; according to the Government of Canada it was not importing crude oil from Russia at the time when the ban was announced.

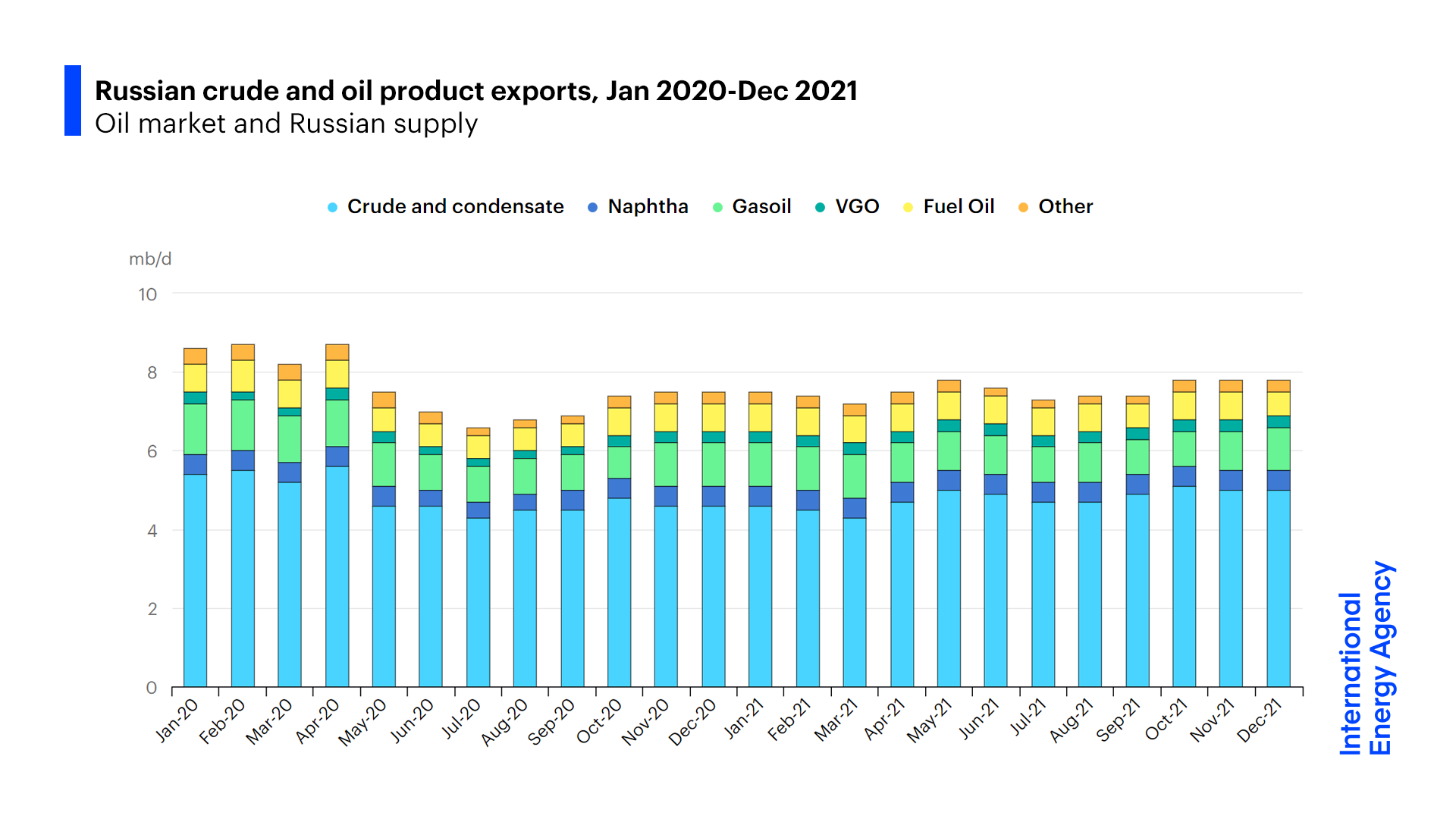
Russian oil supplies and exports in the leadup to the February 2022 invasion of Ukraine

On 2 March the stocks of Gazprom, Rosneft and Lukoil which have secondary listings in London had lost respectively 99.2%, 88.1% and 99.6% of their value year-to-date. In September 2021 Lukoil and Rosneft had a combined market capitalization of $140 billion, by 2 March their combined market cap stood at just $9.3 billion, erasing $130 billion in value. Due to low demand for Russian crude, the benchmark Russian Crude Oil Urals oil was trading at a $18 discount to Brent and still struggling to find purchasers as oil traders feared sanctions.

Prior to the sanctions, about 60 percent of Russia's oil exports went to European OECD member countries. As of November 2021, Russia accounted for 34 percent of European oil imports. It was estimated by the consultancy Energy Aspects that up to 70% of Russian Crude was "struggling to find buyers" as its normal export market of Europe sought crude instead from the Middle East. While sanctions and the toxicity of being seen to do business in Russia were major risk factors, another was the difficulty of the wartime situation in the Black Sea. This led to major shipping companies requiring war insurance for tankers picking up from Novorossiysk, Russia's primary oil export terminal. The difficulties of insurance also affected Kazakh crude which uses Novorossiysk for its Tengiz field.

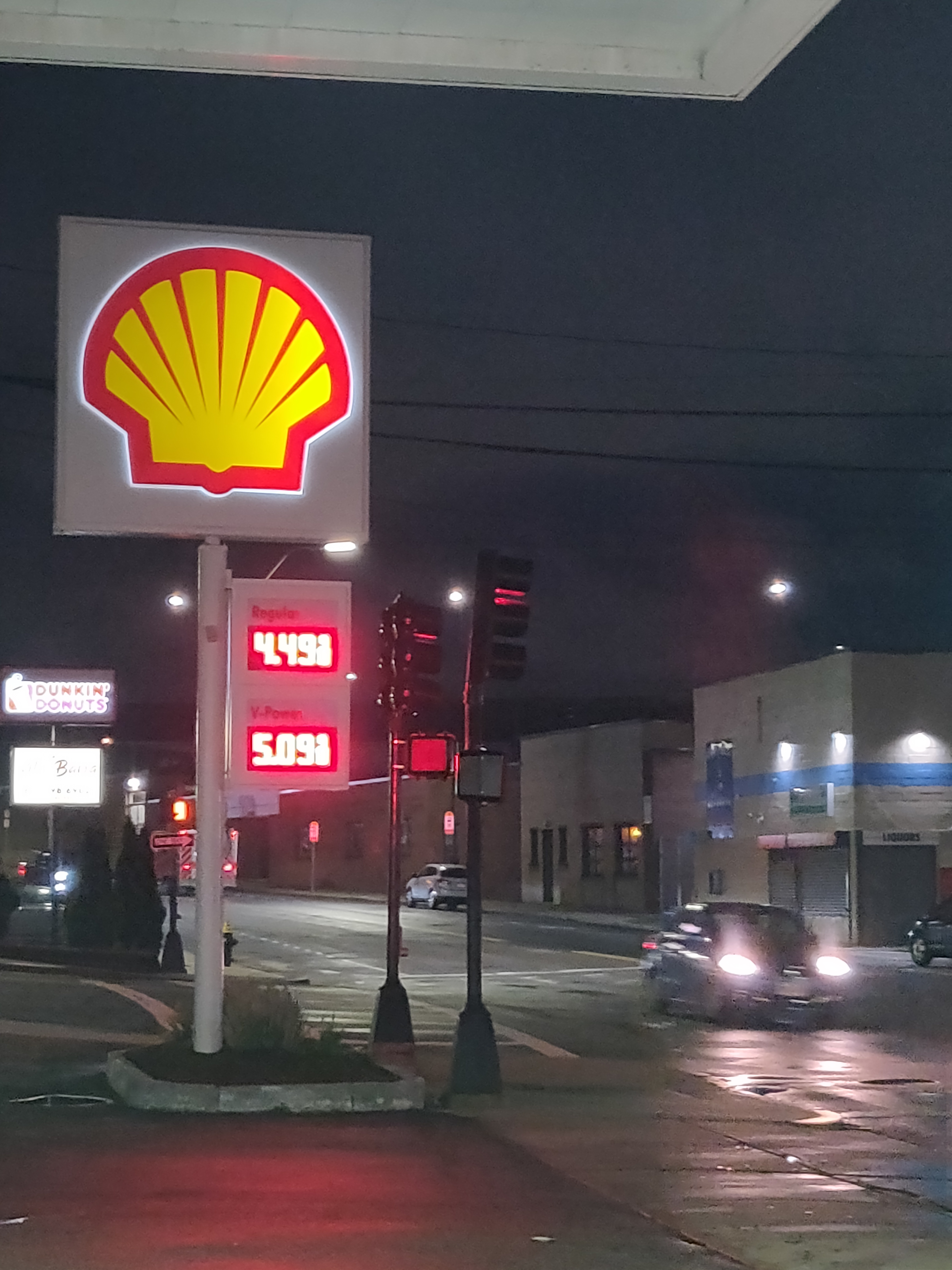
Gasoline price display in Massachusetts in May 2022, showing prices above $4/US gal ($1.06/L)

As of November 2021, Russian oil accounted for 17 percent of total imports in OECD Americas (625 kb/d). On 8 March US President Joe Biden announced a ban on oil from Russia, telling reporters, "We're banning all imports of Russian oil and gas energy. That means Russian oil will no longer be acceptable in US ports and the American people will deal another powerful blow to Putin's war machine." Germany's Minister for Economic Affairs Robert Habeck cautioned, "If we do not obtain more gas next winter and if deliveries from Russia were to be cut then we would not have enough gas to heat all our houses and keep all our industry going."

Russian fossil-fuel exports did not decline by as much as expected after European nations diminished their purchases, because China, India, and other developing nations purchased more oil and gas from Russia. In the first three months since the start of the invasion of Ukraine, Russia earned $24 billion from selling energy to China and India. About 20 percent of Russia's oil exports went to China, Russia's largest single buyer as of November 2021. That year, China purchased an average of 1.6 million barrels of Russian crude oil per day. Five percent of the total oil imports of the OECD Asia Oceania region came from Russia (440 kb/d). In June 2022 Russia became China's largest supplier of oil with Russia supplying over half of China's oil imports. Russia has also historically been a significant exporter of crude to former Soviet and Eastern bloc countries, including Ukraine, Belarus, Romania and Bulgaria.

As many Western nations imposed sanctions on Russian energy firms, Saudi Arabia's Kingdom Holding secretly invested more than $500 million in three major Russian energy companies between February and March 2022. In February, the investment firm invested in global depository receipts of Gazprom and Rosneft worth $365 million and $52 million respectively. Then, between February and March, the firm invested $109 million in Lukoil's US depository receipts. Kingdom Holding is controlled by billionaire Prince Alwaleed Bin Talal and is 16.9% owned by Saudi Arabia's sovereign wealth fund chaired by crown prince Mohammed Bin Salman.

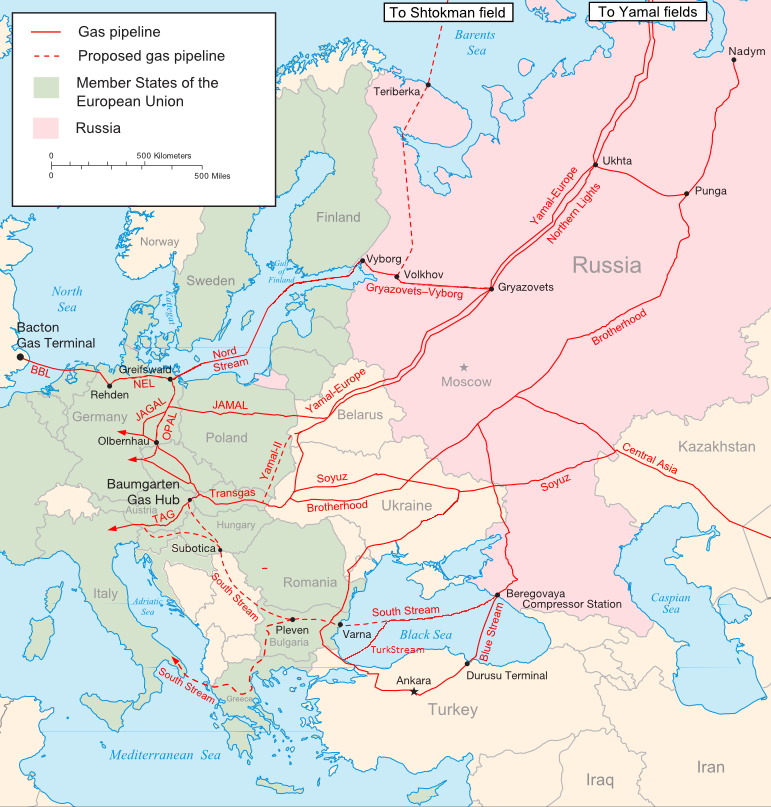
The TurkStream and Blue Stream pipelines connect Russia and Turkey under the Black Sea.

In 2022, Turkish President Recep Tayyip Erdoğan said that Turkey could not join sanctions on Russia because of import dependency. Turkey received almost half of its gas from Russia. Erdoğan and Russian President Vladimir Putin planned for Turkey to become an energy hub for all of Europe. According to Aura Săbăduș, a senior energy journalist focusing on the Black Sea region, "Turkey would accumulate gas from various producers — Russia, Iran and Azerbaijan, [liquefied natural gas] and its own Black Sea gas — and then whitewash it and relabel it as Turkish. European buyers wouldn't know the origin of the gas."

The effect of sanctions, especially the price caps on both crude oil and processed oil which came into effect in late 2022, early 2023 resulted in an immediate fall in Russia's oil revenues with Q1 of 2023 recording income of just $19.61 billion, far below the 2023 budget of $35 billion per quarter and the 2022 results which averaged $42 billion per quarter.

Oil and gas giants, including ExxonMobil and Chevron (the two largest U.S. fossil-fuel companies), gained record profits as the prices for fossil fuel surged in 2022 following the Russian invasion of Ukraine. However, by April 2023, global oil and gas prices decreased, and the decline was due to multiple factors, including declining demand in Europe and Asia, "unseasonably warm" weather in the Northern Hemisphere. The price of oil reached a peak of more than $120 per barrel in June 2022, and declined to below $80 per barrel in April 2023.

In March 2022, Bloomberg reported that China was reselling its US LNG shipments to a desperate Europe at a "hefty profit". India was buying discounted oil from Russia. Saudi Arabia also increased imports of discounted Russian oil. In September 2022, German Economy Minister Robert Habeck accused the United States and other "friendly" gas supplier nations that they were profiting from the Ukraine war with "astronomical prices". He called for more solidarity by the US to assist energy-pressed allies in Europe. French President Emmanuel Macron accused the United States, Norway and other "friendly" natural gas supplier states of extremely high prices for their supplies, saying that Europeans are "paying four times more than the price you sell to your industry. That is not exactly the meaning of friendship."

In September 2025 the International Energy Agency stated that Russia's revenues from oil product exports had in August declined to five-year lows, contributing to Russia's economic slowdown. The same month the General Staff of the Ukrainian Armed Forces claimed to be 'working "systematically" to weaken Russia's military and economic capabilities with a particular focus on fuel, weapons, and ammunition production'.

=== Electricity ===
The 2014 annexation of Crimea started the process of Ukrenergo disconnecting the national power grid from the Russian-controlled IPS/UPS grid (a legacy of the Soviet Union) and joining the European Network of Transmission System Operators for Electricity (ENTSO-E). The military buildup and invasion in 2022 put the process on an emergency timetable. Ukraine and Moldova disconnected from the Russian grid on 28 February, and connected to the synchronous grid of Continental Europe on 16 March. Similarly, Russia's invasion of Ukraine urged the Baltic states synchronization with CESA, permanently disconnecting Lithuania, Latvia, and Estonia from IPS/UPS on 8 February 2025.

Russian attacks destroyed some power generation stations and distribution substations, and advances resulted in the capture of others. The Zaporizhzhia Nuclear Power Plant (along with the Zaporizhzhia thermal power station) was captured on 4 March, and Russia claimed it was being operated by Rosatom.

About a million people lost power due to fighting around Mariupol, Kyiv, and Chernobyl.

=== International organizations and corporations ===
Kristalina Georgieva, the managing director of the International Monetary Fund (IMF) warned that the conflict poses a substantial economic risk for the region and internationally, and added that the IMF could help other countries affected by the conflict, complementary to a $2.2 billion loan package being prepared to assist Ukraine. David Malpass, the president of the World Bank Group, said that the conflict would have far-reaching economic and social effects and reported that the bank was preparing options for significant economic and fiscal support to Ukrainians and the region.

==== Corporate boycotts and removals of service ====
Many international retail and wholesale companies announced a suspension or end to their operations in Russia and in many cases also Belarus. Companies boycotting Russia and Belarus include:

- Shipping: UPS, FedEx, La Poste S.A., and DHL announced that they would halt shipments to Russia and Ukraine. Maersk, MSC and CMA CGM announced that any new container shipping to and from Russia would be suspended.
- Entertainment: Disney, Netflix, Paramount and Universal, Sony Pictures Entertainment, Warner Media/Warner Bros. TikTok restricted access to Russian users and access to Russian content.
- Food and beverage: Yum Brands (KFC, Pizza Hut) McDonald's, Starbucks, Coca-Cola, PepsiCo (except milk and other dairy offerings, baby formula and baby food), Heineken N.V. (except for its Russian brands), Carlsberg (except for its Russian brands), Nestlé, and others.
- Technology: Apple, Adobe, Cisco, Dell, Oracle, Microsoft, Panasonic, Samsung, and many more.
- Automotive: Car manufacturers Ford, General Motors, Jaguar and Volvo suspended all sales and operations in Russia. Honda suspended all exports to Russia and Toyota announced it halted production at its plant in Saint Petersburg and ceased all shipments to Russia. Mazda suspended shipments of parts to Russia. Volkswagen suspended production in and stopped exports to Russia. Nissan also halted manufacturing in Russia and vehicle exports. Stellantis, the maker of Jeep, Fiat, Citroen, Peugeot and Opel vehicles, has suspended exports of cars from Russia and imports of vehicles into the country. Hyundai announced suspension of production in Russia.

=== Stock markets, banking sector, and the effects on the ruble ===
In Russia, the first round of economic sanctions in response to Russia's 2022 invasion of Ukraine had an immediate effect. The Russian stock market crashed, falling 39%, as measured by the RTS Index, on 24 February, the first day of the invasion, recovering over 26% in the following day; however, on 28 February, a Monday, the Moscow stock exchange closed for the day because of the "developing situation". The Moscow stock exchange remained closed on Tuesday and Wednesday as well, marking the longest stock market closure since October 1998. It further remained closed until 21 March 2022, marking almost a full month of closure.

The Russian ruble fell to record lows as Russians rushed to exchange money. The Moscow and St Petersburg Stock Exchanges were suspended. The Central Bank of Russia announced its first market interventions since the 2014 annexation of Crimea to stabilize the market. It also raised interest rates to 20% and banned foreigners from selling local securities. The sanctions put Russia's sovereign wealth fund at risk of disappearing. Long lines and empty ATMs have been reported in Russian cities.

A second round of sanctions involved various Russian banks being removed from SWIFT, and direct sanctions on the Russian Central Bank. The value of the ruble fell 30% against the U.S. dollar, to as low as ₽119/$1 as of 28 February. The Russian central bank raised interest rates to 20% as a result. In an attempt to balance the sinking ruble, it temporarily shut down the Moscow Stock Exchange, mandated that all Russian companies sell 80% of foreign exchange reserves, and prohibited foreigners from liquidating assets in Russia. On 7 March, the ruble was reported to be as low as ₽142.46/$1.

Also on 28 February, Mastercard Inc. blocked multiple Russian financial institutions from its payment network. On 1 March, VISA Inc. announced that it had blocked those on the sanction list and that they were "prepared to comply with additional sanctions that may be implemented". Binance, the world's largest cryptocurrency exchange, announced that it would block Russian individuals who have been sanctioned but would not unilaterally freeze all Russian users accounts. Coinbase, a cryptocurrency exchange platform, blocked 25,000 cryptocurrency wallet addresses related to Russia, believing them to have engaged in illicit activity. However, Coinbase also said that it would "not institute a blanket ban on all Coinbase transactions involving Russian addresses".

On 2 March 2022, Russian listed securities trading on the London market fell sharply before the London Stock Exchange suspended trade of 27 Russian securities. "The FTSE Russell index business has removed Russian listings from its indices, the London Stock Exchange has suspended trading in 27 Russian listed securities" stated London Stock Exchange CEO David Schwimmer. Of the most severe losses, Sberbank was down 99.72% year-to-date to trade for around a single penny, Lukoil was down 99.2%, Polyus was down 95.58%, Gazprom was down 93.71%, and Rosneft was down 92.52%.

During the month of March, the ruble gradually recovered back to its pre-war value of ~80 Rubles per dollar, partially due to increased gas and oil demand from Western companies, as they feared a potential ban on Russian resources, as well as various economic measures designed to prop up the currency.

=== Other commodities ===
Nickel prices doubled after the invasion, due to fears that sanctions on Russia could cut off exports from Nornickel, the world's largest supplier.

=== Foreign investment ===
The Russian invasion of Ukraine continually exacerbated the consumerism market within the country, in which several foreign companies began to suspend their function in Russia. According to one study from Yale University, merely 350 foreign investment companies have successfully fled the region, including luxury and retail sectors such as Chanel and Zara. McDonalds is one of the significant companies that ceased their 850 locations and united with Starbucks, Ikea and Heineken to thwart their operation during the midst of international sanctions. Nevertheless, suspending processes from the sector believe to be a temporary move, and the company remains to disburse their workers. Thus, instituting a proliferation of concern among Russian civilians considering the restaurant was one of the first fast-food chains to operate in the former Soviet Union and drastically merge to Russian everyday activity. One interviewee expressed her concern regarding the closure of diverse sectors: "When we stood in line all those years ago, we understood the country had a real future."

Moreover, it discovered that 150 companies, including BP, Exxon, and Shell, had halted their engagement in the Russian market. Asset-light companies perhaps encounter less complicated occurrences to withdraw their operation than other sectors with a sizeable reserve of workers.

Disney continually participated in the protest against the Russian aggression on Ukraine by pausing its theatrical release; moreover, it was the first entertainment to boycott the country. Warner Bros likewise announced it would pause its releases of films in the country, including The Batman.

Adidas also suspended its contract with the Russian football league after FIFA decided to suspend Russia from international football competitions, including the men's 2022 world cup.

Luxury fashion giant LVMH, an enterprise that possesses ownership in several high-end fashion brands, including Louis Vuitton, Christian Dior, Fendi, and Givenchy, announced it would temporarily shut down its location in Russia

==== Businesses seized by Russia ====
Russia passed a law on 25 April 2023, allowing it to seize the assets of firms from "unfriendly" countries.

- In April, Russian assets of Germany's Uniper and €1.7b of assets of Fortum of Finland were taken.
- In July, the Russian businesses of Denmark's Carlsberg and France's Danone, which were both up for sale, were seized.

=== Export restrictions ===
The Biden administration announced the latest round of export restrictions on Russia and Belarus, adding 120 Russian and Belarusian entities to the list of sanctioned entities, most of which have connections to the military. These restrictions are designed to weaken Russian and Belarusian defense, aviation, naval, and other strategic sectors in response to Russia's invasion of Ukraine. Secretary of Commerce Gina Raimondo said in a statement, "these parties are being effectively cut off from the inputs necessary to sustain Putin's war".

=== Effects on GDP ===
In 2022, the year of the Russian invasion, Ukraine's GDP contracted by 29.1%. In 2022, steel production in Ukraine dropped by 71% due to Russian destruction or occupation of key steel plants; exports fell 35% in 2022 compared to the previous year.

The Russian economy ultimately shrank by 2.1% in 2022, far less than had been earlier predicted by the Russian economic ministry, World Bank, and Institute of International Finance. Sanctions imposed by the U.S., Europe, and other countries adversely affected the Russian economy, and Russia's manufacturing, wholesale, and retail trade sectors all declined in 2022. However, these losses were counterbalanced by increased Russian military spending and oil and gas exports, as well as increases in the agriculture and mining sectors. Russia also evaded some sanctions through tactics such as bartering, transacting through countries that did not sanction Russia, and using cryptocurrency.

=== Other ===
A study suggests that structural humanitarian, economic, and financial effects of the war will include a) the EU getting "more serious about defence" b) that the green transition accelerates c) unwinding of broader Eurasian economic integration d) EU accession prospects for countries in Southeast Europe may improve.

Further macroeconomic changes include major calls for novel excess profit taxes such as on energy companies or on war-caused excess profits. Proponents include UN Secretary-General António Guterres.

=== Arms manufacturing ===
The major weapon manufacturers, such as Raytheon, Lockheed Martin and BAE Systems, reported sharp rises in interim revenues and profits.

=== Agriculture ===
The term "ABCD" refers to the four companies – ADM, Bunge, Cargill and Louis Dreyfus – that dominate world agricultural commodity trading. The ABCD commodity-trading companies have seen large profits as a result of the war in Ukraine and rising food prices.

== Effects on population ==
Due to the deteriorating economic situation in Russia, coupled with civil and political unrest, people have fled the country. A journalist who fled to Georgia wrote on his Facebook page, "Do you think we are all tourists...We are refugees...We ran not from bullets, bombs and missiles, but from prison." With large sections of airspace closed to Russian aircraft, flights from Russia to Tel Aviv, Israel; Istanbul, Turkey; Yerevan, Armenia; Baku, Azerbaijan; and Tbilisi, Georgia were sold out for many days, as well as buses into Baltic states. One Latvia-based Russian tech worker, seeing high demand to leave the country, chartered a flight and filled the approximately 160 seats within 24 hours. The wave of emigration has caused many officials and analysts to warn of a possible significant long-term drag on the economy, especially if the emigration is permanent.

Those staying in Russia face surging inflation and unemployment, expensive credit, capital controls, restricted travel, and shortages of goods. Analysts have identified similarities with conditions in the decade following the collapse of the Soviet Union at the end of the Cold War. Russia's Kaliningrad exclave faces ever-increasing isolation. Several leading foreign tech companies withdrew from Russia or suspended operations while Russian authorities also doubled down on the use of their "sovereign internet" technology to block access to numerous independent media and social media platforms. Altogether, it enabled Russia to put the entire country in digital isolation, as in China, with the Golden Shield Project.

Since Russia is the largest trading and economic partner for post-Soviet states in Central Asia and a major destination for millions of CIS's migrant workers, Central Asia has been particularly hard hit by sanctions against Russia.

=== Infrastructure destruction ===
The Russian invasion led to the destruction of much of Ukraine's infrastructure and urban landscape. Before the war, Ukraine had a highly developed infrastructure, representing 17% of its GDP. Of the Ukrainian population, 100% had access to electricity, 94.9% had access to clean cooking fuel, about 47% had access to central heating, 89% had access to clean water, and 74% had access to the gas distribution network.

Starting in September 2022, Russia focused on Ukraine's energy grid, launching a series of attacks on power stations and the electricity distribution system. An Energy Damage Assessment from the United Nations Development Program and World Bank, released in April 2023, estimated that the Russian attacks from the invasion of 24 February 2022, through 31 December 2022, had inflicted more than US$10 billion in damages and cut off power to 12 million people. Russian missile and drone attacks reduced Ukraine's generating capacity by 61%. The Russian seizure of the Zaporizhzhia Nuclear Power Plant cut off almost all of the 750 kV high-voltage power grid used to deliver energy from the plant.

About one-quarter of coal and other mines owned by the Ukrainian government were occupied by the Russian military.

A report in March 2023 by the Independent International Commission of Inquiry on Ukraine found that indiscriminate Russian attacks on Ukrainian infrastructure were among many war crimes perpetrated by Russia against Ukraine.

== Opposition to sanctions ==
Russia Countries on Russia's "unfriendly countries list". Countries and territories on the list have imposed or joined sanctions against Russia.

China expressed opposition to sanctions against Russia. Nations and individuals that oppose sanctions against Russia state that sanctions do not generally result in a change in the policies of the sanctioned nation and that sanctions mostly hurt the civilian population who have little control over the issues pertaining to foreign policy. India is also buying discounted oil from Russia. Trade with India would enable Russia to bypass some of the sanctions, which has led the US to tell India there might be "consequences". Saudi Arabia also increased imports of discounted Russian oil. Not a single country in Africa or the Middle East has imposed major sanctions on Russia.

=== Russian seizure of goods by nations imposing sanctions ===
In early March 2022, former Russian president Dmitry Medvedev announced a new law which would allow Russia to nationalize assets of Western companies pulling out of the country. Concerns have been raised by analysts that potential auctions of assets of companies that have left Russia would potentially mirror the 1990s "loans for shares" program introduced by Boris Yeltsin. This could potentially create more wealth for already favored individuals, new oligarchs, or business opportunities for Russian supporters.

On 28 March 2022, Russia reportedly seized multiple Audemars Piguet Swiss watches from one of its Russian stores that had been closed after the invasion. The seized items were valued to total multiple millions of dollars as each watch can cost upwards of $921,000 a piece, and were reportedly taken by Russian FSB agents who claimed the watches had violated local customs rules when they had been imported. Additionally hundreds of leased foreign passenger jets, valued at about $10 billion have remained grounded in the country with requests for the jets to be returned denied.

CME Group halted the acceptance of Russian aluminum from 13 April 2024, following new sanctions by the US and UK in response to Russia's actions in Ukraine. However, aluminum produced in Russia before this remained eligible for delivery. Coordination between UK and US officials aimed to mitigate any market disruptions, with the ban announced after weekend trading had closed.

== See also ==
- Bibliography of Vladimir Putin
- Bibliography of Russian history (1991–present)
- International Sponsors of War
- Ukrainian refugee crisis

== Sources ==
This article incorporates text from a free content work. Licensed under CC BY 4.0 (license statement/permission). Text taken from The State of Food Security and Nutrition in the World 2025, Food and Agriculture Organization of the United Nations.
