= Payonline =

- Founded: 2009; 17 years ago
- Country of origin: Russia
- CEO: Marat Abasaliev
- Industry: E-commerce
- Services: E-commerce payment system
- Parent: Net Element
- Website: www.payonline.ru

Payonline is a Russian e-commerce payment system founded in 2009. The company is one of the three biggest internet payment service providers in Russia and a member of the Russian Association for Electronic Communications. The Payonline system provides clients (websites and mobile apps) with the ability to accept payments made via Visa and MasterCard bank cards as well as using electronic money (Qiwi, WebMoney, Yandex.Money).

In 2012, the company won Runet Prize in the "Economy, Business and Investments" category.

== History ==
Payonline was founded in Russia in 2009 as Payonline System LLC. Its CEO Marat Abasaliev was one of the founders of the company.

In 2011 Payonline joined the Russian Association for Electronic Communications (RAEC). The following year, the company received the Runet Prize award in "Economy, Business and Investment" category. In 2014, Payonline won the Microsoft Partner Awards prize in the category of Windows 8 Partner Service of the Year.

In March 2015, Payonline was acquired by the American corporation Net Element.

In 2015, the company launched Pay-Travel, a solution designed to automate payments for the travel industry.
