= Gambling in Russia =

Dedicated gambling zones are located in Altai Republic, Kaliningrad Oblast, Krasnodar Krai, and Primorsky Krai.

The gambling industry in Russia consists of three sectors: state lotteries, casinos and slot machines operations, and sports betting. Lotteries are organized by the Ministry of Sports and the Ministry of Finance of Russia and operated by certified organizations. Legal casinos and EGMs are confined to four specific gambling zones in Altai Republic, Kaliningrad, Krasnaya Polyana (near Sochi), and Artyom (near Vladivostok). Bookmakers operate both online and offline. Strict regulations led to the emergence of a significant underground gambling market in Russia.

== History ==
The history of gambling in Russia dates back to the 16th century when playing cards were introduced from European countries.The first Russian regulation of gambling was established in 1551 with the adoption of Stoglav in the Tsardom of Moscow. The Stoglav had a special chapter dedicated to gambling and declared both participating and being present at games a punishable offense. At the same time, the authorities attempted to introduce taxation: the documents issued in the early 17th century describe the ways card games, dice, and card and dice courts were tax-farmed.

=== In Soviet Union ===
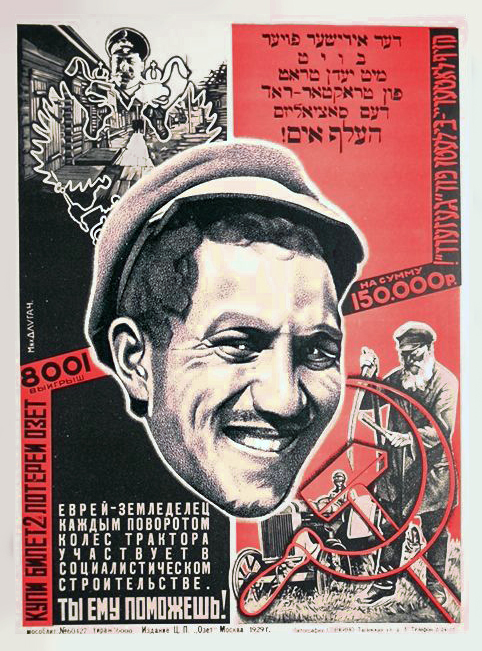
A 1929 poster in Russian and Yiddish for the OZET lottery

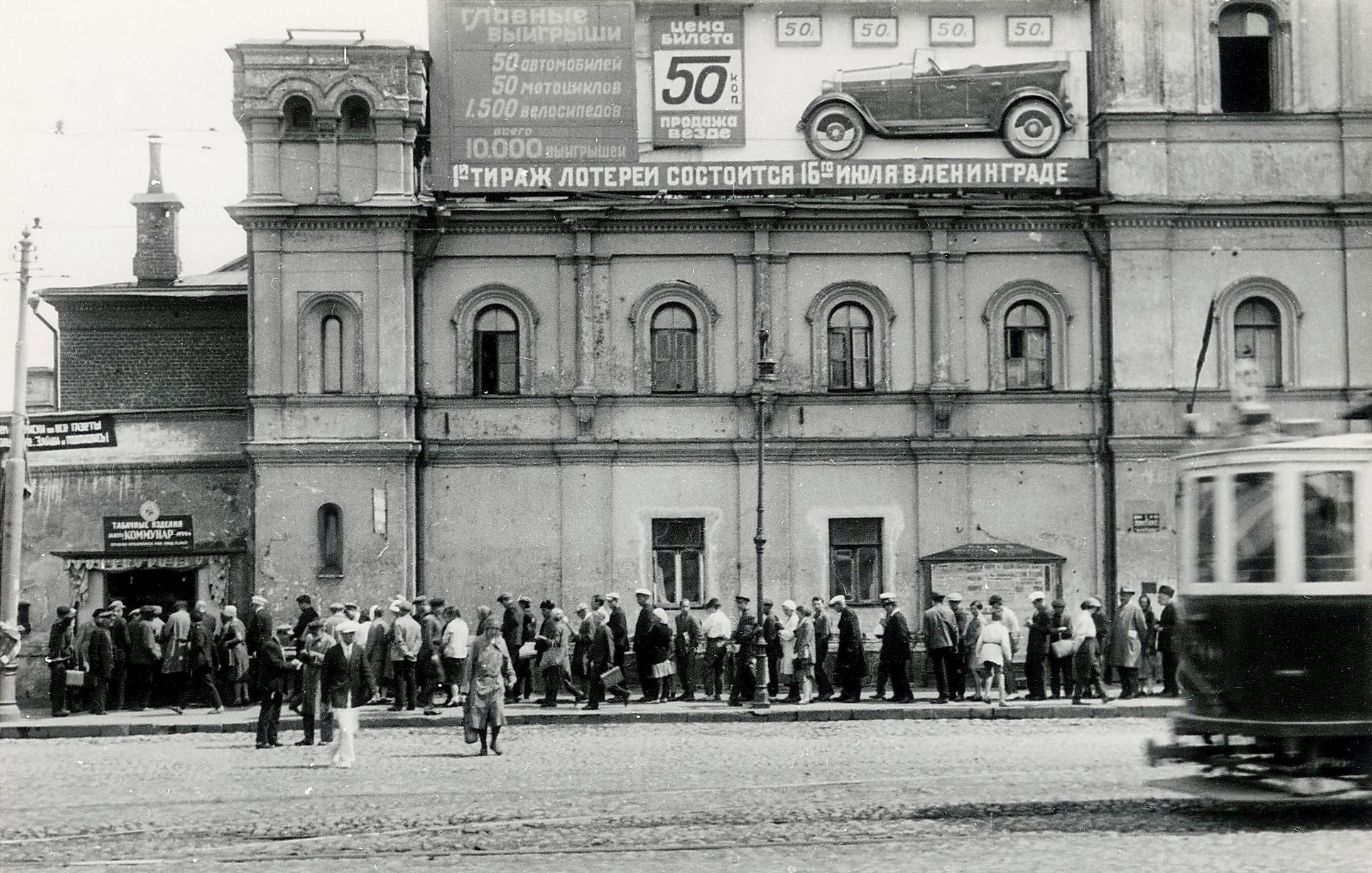
Poster advertising lottery in Moscow, 1930

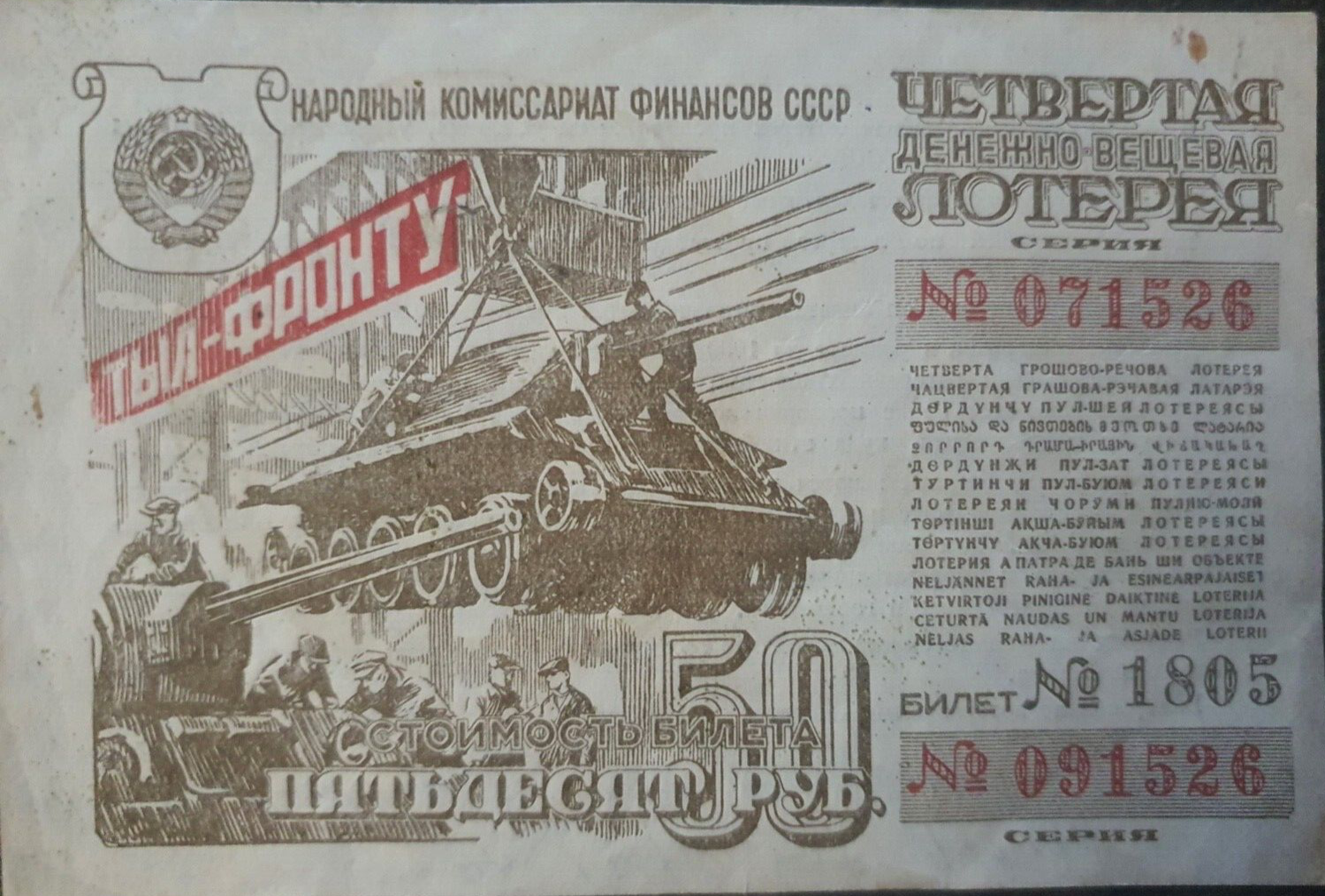
Lottery ticket from 1944

Following the Russian Revolution, the Soviet authorities initially took a prohibitive stance towards gaming. The Petrograd Military Revolutionary Committee (PMRC) issued a decree on November 24, 1917, setting a task to close all card gambling establishments and confiscate cards, funds, and premises. In 1918, lotteries were forbidden, too. However, card gambling remained immensely popular and was never fully forbidden: the authorities saw the potential of replenishing provincial and city budgets from gambling.

In 1921, the All-Russian Lottery was held to support those affected by the Russian famine of 1921–1922. The gaming houses reappeared in Soviet republics, with the state taking 95% of the gambling revenue, 65% of the returns from thirty and forty, and 65% of the entrance fee. In May 1922, the first real casino, The Splendid Palace, opened in Petrograd. It featured dominoes, roulette, macao, baccarat, chemin de fer, and boule. A variety of casinos and gaming houses opened in all major cities across the country.

The first hippodromes in the USSR were opened in the early 1920s, and the totalisator operated since 1923 at the restored Central Moscow Hippodrome.

At the end of 1927, the People's Commissar for Internal Affairs presented a report devoted to gambling and the gaming business existing at that time to the RSFSR SPC. The main idea voiced through the report was that its incompatibility of an idle, bourgeois pastime with the true spirit of the working proletariat. And, regardless of the rather modest figures in the gaming sector (for example, only 4 small gaming houses operated in Leningrad at that time), the key prohibitive provisions in the report were approved.

All this led to a ban on the opening of gambling houses in worker districts, it was followed by a ban on gambling in the entire districts, and later, on May 8, 1928, by the resolution of the USSR SPC, all Soviet Republics were instructed, the reasons not being explained, "to take measures on the immediate closure of any facilities for card games, roulette, lotto and other kinds of gambling". The closure of gaming houses and the gambling ban were pushed by the penal policy course shaped by the Soviet state, providing for overall reinforcement of criminal sanctions in the country and the modification of the state's penitentiary policy upon the whole. Later, lotteries were also restricted. On June 6, 1928, the Workers-Peasants’ Government of the RSFSR issues the resolution, "On Banning the Draw of Liquors in Lotteries". First, on January 1, 1930, the USSR SPC issues the resolution "On the Procedure of Issuing Permits for Lottery Arrangement", and then, on August 31, 1932, another USSR SPC Resolution #1336 was announced, "On the Regulation of the Lottery Business".

Gambling was outlawed in the USSR for most of its history. However, the citizens that could afford to risk money met in so-called katrans”, illegal underground casinos masked as hotel rooms, apartments, or dachas. Katrans could be found in major cities, such as Moscow and Leningrad, as well as popular resorts in Krasnodarsky Krai or Crimea. Typically, an underground casino included several rooms reserved for various games, such as roulette, bridge, poker, etc. The owners of katrans paid waiters at luxurious restaurants, hotel staff, and taxi drivers to recruit new gamblers. The KGB often kept the owners of the illegal casinos hooked to collect information about the clientele.

The first slot machines in the USSR were installed at the Soviet cruise liners that traveled abroad in the early 1970s. In March 1971, an experimental slot hall was opened in Mustamäe, Estonia. By the end of 1980s, dozens of illegal slot halls operated at the popular Soviet resorts.

In 1987, the Council of Ministers of the USSR issued a decreed that allowed each ministry to operate a foreign trade association, leading to creation of the "Intourservice" within the USSR State Committee for Foreign Tourism (Goscomintourist). A new organization was tasked to develop new kinds of additional services for foreign tourists payable in freely convertible currency. In 1988, 226 slot machines provided by Dutch, Swedish, and Spanish companies were installed in Intourist hotels in Moscow, Leningrad, Sochi, Yalta, Minsk, Tallinn, Vyborg and Pyatigorsk, including Hotel Intourist Moscow, Cosmos Hotel, and Yalta Hotel Complex. The machines required foreign currency to play, but became widely popular among the wealthy Soviet people: a single slot machine earned up to two median salaries of a qualified worker a day.

In March 1989, the Central Committee of the Communist Party of the Soviet Union and the Council of Ministers issued a decree that instructed state departments to propose measures to increase the fiscal revenue. Goskominturist proposed to open slot halls with slot machines accepting the Soviet Ruble. The same year, in August 1989, the ban on gambling was effectively lifted, and a joint Soviet-Spanish enterprise "Fortuna" was established to organize gambling halls across the country. In the second half of 1989th and the early 1990th, around 2.5 thousand slot machines were installed in Moscow, Leningrad, Minsk, Kyiv, Kishenev, Tbilisi, Tashkent, Stavropol, Kislovodsk, Novorossyisk, Odessa, Smolensk, Tambov, Saratov, Tolyatti, and other Soviet cities. The slot machines accepted 20 kopecks coins and "Fortuna" entered a special agreement with Sberbank to ensure that the coins will be available at all gambling zones.

The first casino in the USSR, Astoria Palace, opened in the Estonian SSR in the spring of 1989 at the Palace Hotel in Tallinn. The second casino was opened in Moscow on August 23, 1989, at the Savoy Hotel.

=== In modern Russia ===
The gambling industry exploded in 2002 when the State Duma, the lower house of the Parliament of Russia, transferred the right to issue gambling licenses from the local authorities to The Federal Agency for Sports and Body Culture. In just three years, the agency issued over 4,000 licenses, which allowed for the opening of multiple casinos or slot halls with no geographical restrictions.

By 2005, Moscow alone had 58 casinos (+28 compared to 2002) and 70,000 slot machines (+50,000 compared to 2002). In a single location around the Moscow Kiyevsky railway station, the number of slot halls grew from 4 in 2002 to 50 in 2005. The uncontrolled development of the gambling industry, particularly the proliferation of slot machines in residential areas, has become a widespread issue. Legislators at the federal and regional levels considered various measures to limit the gambling industry, including restricting the number of gambling establishments per city district, forcing casinos out of urban areas, or establishing a dedicated "Las Vegas" in the Far North.

The idea of outlawing casinos in all but few remote designated zones was proposed by Vladimir Putin. By the law, that came into effect in 2007, most gambling activities with the exception of sports betting were limited to dedicated gambling zones. The limitations also applied to online gambling. Gambling companies that met certain requirements were allowed to operate until June 30, 2009, without obtaining new permits or moving to designated gambling zones. According to the legislation, the legal gambling age in the country is 18.

By the end of June 2009, when the ban came into full power, there were 38 casinos and about 500 slot halls in Moscow alone. The industry employed 350,000 people and paid around USD 2 billion in taxes annually.

In 2009, gambling was banned almost everywhere in Russia. The only exceptions are four specific arranged zones, namely "Altai Palace" in the Altai Republic, "Sobranie" in Kaliningrad, "Casino Sochi" in Krasnaya Polyana near Sochi and "Shambala" and "Tigre de Cristal" in Artyom near Vladivostok. The Azov City gambling complex in Krasnodar was closed in 2015.

== Industry ==
=== Lotteries ===
The lotteries in Russia are a state monopoly. The lotteries are organized by the Ministry of Sports and the Ministry of Finance of Russia and operated by certified organizations. Two largest operators are Stoloto and the State Sports Lotteries. The lottery tickets can be print or digital. The prize fund typically amounts to 50% (sometimes 60% to 70%) of ticket sales. In 2022, the state budget got 7.5 billion rubles from lotteries.

=== Casinos and EGMs ===
In Russia, casinos and slot machines are only legal in four designated gambling zones Siberian Coin in Altai Republic, Yantarnaya in Kaliningrad Oblast, Krasnaya Polyana (near Sochi), and Primorie in Artyom in Primorsky Krai. In 2024, they reported a total of 2.1 million visitors.

=== Bookmakers ===
Sports betting became a regulated industry in 2002 and specialized rules for bookmakers were introduced in 2006 and 2007. Unlike other forms of gambling, it wasn't limited to dedicated zones. As of 2020, to operate legally, a bookmaker must have a net asset value of over a billion rubles, registered capital of over 100 million rubles, and a bank guarantee of no less than 500 million rubles. Online betting has been regulated since 2014; all online (interactive) bets should be made via the Centers for Interactive Bets (CUPIS).

As of 2024, there have been 15 licensed bookmakers in Russia. According to the 2025 RBK Market Research report, the list of largest Russian bookmakers included Fonbet, Winline, Betboom, Liga Stavok, Pari (ex-part of Parimatch), Betcity, Baltbet, Olimpbet, Melbet, and Marathon Bet. In 2024, the ten largest bookmakers have proceeded around 1.7 trillion rubles in bets combined. — a significant 43% increase compared to 1.22 trillion rubles in 2023, 879.2 billion rubles in 2022, and 632 billion rubles in 2021. The market growth was partially related to the increase of income of contractual servicemen and workers of the armaments industry during the 2022 Russian invasion of Ukraine.

=== Illegal gambling ===
Following the ban, the Russian prosecutors closed thousands of illegal gambling spots in just a few years. A 2011 investigation revealed ties between an underground gambling network in Moscow Region and high-ranking officials of the prosecutor's office. In 2020, law enforcement authorities revealed a large network of underground casinos and slot halls, located in secret rooms within betting shops, including Winline, Unionbet, and Greenbet.

The ban on gambling outside the designated zones pushed casinos online, resulting in the development of a massive illegal online gambling industry, operated by companies licensed in Curaçao and other jurisdictions. Such casinos orchestrated payments through sophisticated schemes that involved corrupt managers in large Russian banks who replaced the MCC codes for high-risk operations with those indicating legitimate transactions, as well as digital money providers, such as Yandex Money and Qiwi. According to The Bell investigation, up to 60% online money transfers in Russia in the mid-2010s could be traced to illegal gambling. In the early 2020s, the Central Bank of Russia attempted to combat such schemes through probes and license revocations with limited success.

== Legislation ==
=== Taxation ===
The gambling tax was introduced in Russia in 1998 and became a regional tax in 2004. The gambling tax in Russia is calculated per gaming equipment, and regional authorities set the rates within the limits defined by federal legislation. The tax rate is 3 to 15 thousand rubles per slot machine, 10 to 14 thousand rubles per cash desk, 50 to 250 thousand rubles per gaming table or processing center, and 2.5 to 3 million rubles for an online gambling processing center (operated by bookmakers). Organizers of gambling activities are required to submit declarations and pay tax every month. Since 2017, bookmakers have additionally provided a part of their proceeds to sports federations. By 2024, such obligatory targeted contributions amounted to 2% of the bookmakers' revenue.

In 2023, the collected gambling tax totaled 1.7 billion rubles. The targeted contributions of bookmakers to sports federations totaled 16.5 billion rubles for the first half of 2024.

The wins in all gambling activities are subject to personal income tax, which differs for tax residents, non-residents, and the winners of promotional lotteries (which are subject to the 35% tax). There is no tax for winnings less than 4,000 rubles.

== See also ==
- Russian roulette, often attributed to having started in Russia
- Problem gambling
- Fyodor Dostoyevsky, a Russian who is considered to be one of Europe's major novelists, became addicted to gambling in the 1860s. In 1866, in just two months, he wrote The Gambler, a novel elaborating on his own obsession with gambling, to pay out his gambling debt to publisher Fyodor Stellovsky.
- Nikolay Nekrasov, a renowned Russian poet, writer, critic, and publisher, was a avid gambler, who often invested his winnings into his Sovremennik magazine. The high-profile acquaintances he made while gambling in the gentlemen's club sometimes helped him in relations with state censors.
