= PayCash =

Russian financial technology company

PayCash is a Russian electronic payment platform for making anonymous Internet purchases with cash via kiosks.

The system is based on the technology proposed in the eighties by Dutch David Chaum. PayCash is developed by CJSC "Processing Technologies" and JSC «Aerospace Equipment Corporation», with the financial support from Tavrichesky Bank. PayCash owns 4 patents on technologies used in the system.

Several major projects are implemented based on the PayCash technology:

- Yandex.Money, payment system, currency is Russian ruble
- E-port (acquired by Qiwi), Russian payment service provider
- MOBI.Money, payment services
- MonetaExpress, money transfer system
- iDealer (acquired by moneyps), a network of automated kiosks for accepting payments in Russia and Ukraine
- iDram, payment system, currency is Armenian dram
- CyberCheck, payment system
- MegaFon, payment system
- MTS. payment system
- Ozon.ru, payment system
- 7-Eleven, payment system
