= Liga Stavok =

Russian gambling company

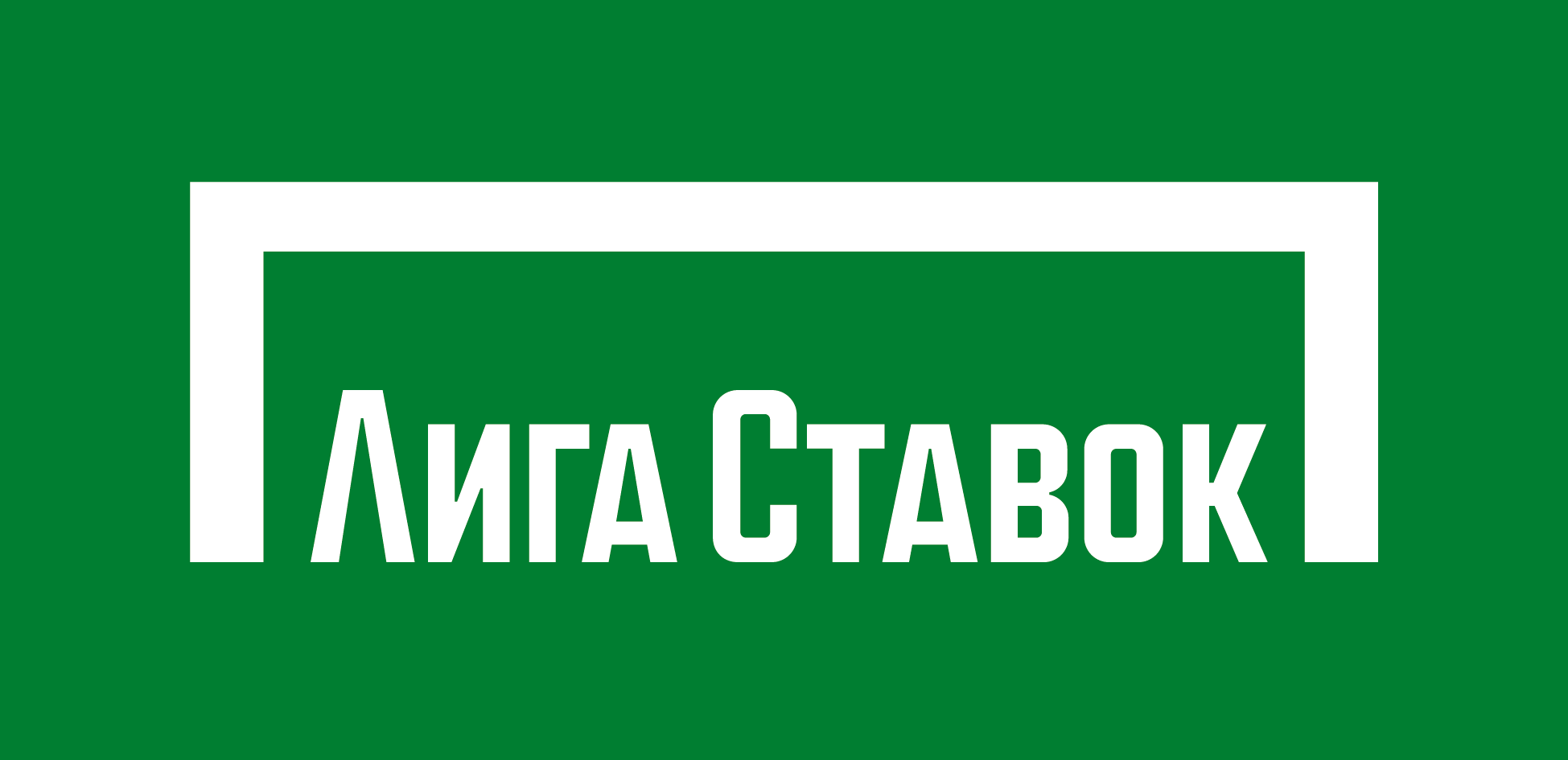
- Founded: 2008; 18 years ago
- Founder: Oleg Zhuravsky, Yuri Krasovsky
- Location: Moscow, Russia
- Region served: Russia
- Website: https://www.ligastavok.ru

The Liga Stavok (Russian: Ли́га Ста́вок) is a Russian sports betting company, established in 2008.

== History ==
The history of “Liga Stavok” is closely connected with the name of its founder Oleg Zhuravsky, a significant Russian lobbyist of bookmaker business interests. Zhuravsky was born in 1969, served in the Western Group of Forces in the GDR from 1988 to 1990, and graduated from the Ugra State University in 1991. Later, in 2010, he also earned a degree from the St. Petersburg Institute of International Trade, Economics and Law. He took a great interest in the bookmaking business in Europe during the 1990s. Since 1997, Zhuravsky held leading positions in companies of the Russian gambling industry. In the mid-2000s, he founded the National Association of Russian Bookmakers and started lobbying the interests and development of this sphere. Under his leadership, the Association has united more than half of the largest actors in the Russian market.

After Zhuravsky's death, the media emphasized his decisive role in the progress of the Russian betting industry. As a result of the activists’ efforts, Russian bookmakers were exempted from the law “On state regulations of activities on organizing and conducting gambling.”

In 2008 Zhuravsky together with his friend and business partner Yuriy Krasovsky founded "First International bookmaker company" that start its activity under the "Liga Stavok" brand.

From 2017 Yuriy Krasovsky is a President of Bookmaker Company "Liga Stavok" and First self-regulated bookmaker's organization of Russia.

=== Against match-fixing ===
Since 2010, the “Liga Stavok” began to cooperate with the Russian Premier League (RPL) to counteract football match fixing and corruption in sport. Oleg Zhuravsky was appointed adviser to the President of the Premier League on the prevention of match-fixing. His company started monitoring and controlling the pre-match betting markets on the RPL matches in order to detect collusion between participating teams. In 2013, Zhuravsky promoted the adoption of a law that increased the penalty for participation in match-fixing. Sports federations were obligated to take measures to combat match-fixing and to inform authorities about the unlawful effect of such competitions. For violation of these rules, state accreditation could be withdrawn. According to the law, bookmakers were required to accept bets only upon the presentation of identity documents, to keep records of gambling participants, as well as to inform the taxation organizations and sports federations of the payouts or payable winnings according to the results of wagers on matches which ended with the least probable outcome.

=== Interactive bets ===
Oleg Zhuravsky proposed amendments to federal law No. 244-ФЗ "On state regulation of activities for organizing and conducting gambling,” which came into effect in 2014. Legislative innovations obliged bookmakers and organizers of parimutuel betting to join self-regulatory organizations (SRO), and introduced the notions of "interactive bets" and "the Сenter for taking interactive bets" (Russian: «Центр учёта приёма интерактивных ставок», ЦУПИС) through which bookmakers could be legalized via the Internet. At the end of 2014, a number of large bookmakers, including the “Liga Stavok,” Winline, "1×Stavka" and 888.ru, united into the "First Self-Regulatory Organization" headed by Zhuravsky. Improvement of the legal framework for online bookmaking took another year, and in February 2016 the first “Center” (ЦУПИС) was launched by the “First SRO” on the platform of the non-banking credit organization “Mobil’naya karta”. The "Liga Stavok" was the first Russian bookmaker company, which was integrated with the “First Сenter for Taking Interactive Bets” and began to receive bets online. To make an interactive bet, customers had to go online to register at the “Liga Stavok” website, then on the “Center’s” website, and, finally, confirm their identity by visiting the bookmaker's club or an office of its partner.

In November 2016, the “Liga Stavok” was awarded the Runet Prize as the best online service offering sports entertainment.

=== Cooperation with sports associations ===
On April 1, 2017, the federal law "On Introducing Amendments to Certain Legislative Acts of the Russian Federation in Formation of Mechanisms for Increasing the Income of the Subjects of Children's and Youth Sports as well as the Subjects of Professional Sports" was enacted. This legalization expanded the ways in which the bookmaker business might be advertised, but at the same time affirmed that bookmakers should give part of their profits to sports associations that control matches. The target deductions of bookmakers were 5% of the positive difference between the number of accepted bets and paid wins. Of these deductions, 20% were to be spent on the development of children's and youth sports, and another 80% - for professional sports. The “Liga Stavok,” led by Oleg Zhuravsky, was one of the main public supporters of the adoption of this law and actively participated in its elaboration. When the law was implemented, agreements were signed with the following sports associations:

- Russian Biathlon Union (April 2017);
- Russian Basketball Federation (April 2017);
- VTB United League (April 2017);
- All-Russian Volleyball Federation (April 2017);
- Handball Federation of Russia (May 2017);
- Russian Chess Federation (May 2017);
- National Federation of Badminton Russia (June 2017);
- The Union of Mixed Martial Arts of Russia (June 2017);
- Russian Bandy Federation (June 2017);
- Russian Tennis Federation (June 2017);
- Russian Football Union (June 2017);
- Russian Table Tennis Federation (July 2017);
- Ice Hockey Federation of Russia (July 2017);
- Kontinental Hockey League (July 2017);
- Rugby Federation of Russia (September 2017);
- Curling Federation of Russia (October 2017);
- Boxing Federation of Russia.

== Long-term partnership ==
Since 2010, Liga Stavok has been cooperating with the Russian Premier League in the framework of the Pan-European Early Warning System, aimed at fighting match fixing. In September 2012, together with the head of the Russian Premier League (RFPL) Sergey Pryadkin, the company announced the creation of the All-Russian Football Lottery, 10% of the proceeds of which was supposed to be sent to the RFPL for the development of youth football and mass football in the Russian Federation. The projected revenue, according to the parties, should have been at least 1.6 billion rubles in five years.

In 2014, Liga Stavok became the official betting company of the Russian Premier League, with which it currently works as the general partner of the Russian Premier League.

In July 2017, according to the results of a closed tender, Liga Stavok became the general partner of the Russian Football Championship. This status provided the company with advertising time on television broadcasts of the Premier League matches (Match TV, Our Football, Match! Football 1, Match! Arena and others), as well as advertising on stadiums and billboards around the field.

In 2017, the President of Liga Stavok, Yuri Krasovsky, and the head of the Russian Premier League, Sergey Pryadkin, announced the establishment of a new sports prize, League Fair Play. The purpose of the award is to encourage Russian teams showing respect for the rules and conditions of the game, demonstrating friendly behavior towards the opponent, referees, fans and the media. UEFA recommends a methodology for assessing the behavior of teams for professional football leagues, and the analysis of matches using the Fair Play system is carried out by the match delegate.

In the same year, the Russian Hockey Federation and BC Liga Stavok agreed on a long-term partnership by signing a five-year sponsorship agreement. The signing ceremony, which took place on the eve of the First Channel Cup, was attended by FHR First Vice-President Roman Rotenberg and President of Liga Stavok Yury Krasovsky. “We are pleased that we have a new partner, we have been negotiating for a long time. This will help us develop all nine national teams, the future of our hockey depends on the volume of investments ", - commented the contract Roman Rotenberg. "Liga Stavok" is the official partner of the Russian national hockey team.

During the XXIII Olympic Winter Games in South Korean Pyeongchang, Liga Stavok acted as the general partner of the House of Sport, opened by the Olympians Support Foundation. For the fans, live broadcasts of competitions, teleconferences, exhibitions, film screenings, contests and entertainment tournaments were organized in the House of Sport, and the bookmaker presented a separate line of betting with coefficients for the events of the Olympics.

On August 31, 2018, Yuri Krasovsky and the President of the Russian Hockey Federation, Vladislav Tretyak, announced the establishment of the “Heroes of Hockey” sports award, marking the merits of the national team for the season. According to Vladislav Tretiak, the victory of the national team in the Olympic Games in 2018 united the country and gave a new impetus to the development of hockey. “Today, the matches of our teams attract the attention of tens of millions of fans. That is why we, together with Liga Stavok, established the Heroes of Hockey Award. We thank our partners for their attention to hockey, for the desire to convey to people the names of athletes who glorify our country and are heroes for the Russians.” The laureates of the award are determined annually according to the results of the official matches of the Russian national team of the past sporting season in the framework of the Euro Hockey Tour, the World Cup, the Olympic Games, the Euro Challenge, the World Cup and other tournaments.

Commenting on the cooperation with tLiga Stavok, Vladislav Tretyak stressed that it is developing very successfully: “We signed the contract at the First Channel Cup, won it, and then won the Olympics. Liga Stavok is one of our main partners, a very reliable and responsible partner, a company with high social responsibility. It is pleasant that in Liga Stavok they respect and support all our undertakings with great respect, in particular, in such an important area for us as the development of the National Hockey Players Training Program.”

Analyzing the results of the activities of BC Liga Stavok for 2018 at a press conference at the IAA "Russia Today", Yuri Krasovsky said that the company's total investment in the development of national sports amounted to about 1 billion rubles.

Today BC Liga Stavok is the general partner of the Russian Premier League. as well as the official partner of the FHR and the Russian national hockey team.

== Sponsorship ==
In 2013, “Liga Stavok” held a joint season with "Formula-1", being the first Russian partner of first Russian team of the "Formula" Marussia F1 Team. Liga Stavok logo was placed on the car Marussia MR02 and pilots’ suits during all 19 Grand Prix of the season.

Since 2014, Liga Stavok acts as prime partner of the annual festival Moscow Chess Open. and provides prize fund of the fest, which is recognizred as most massive according to number of participants in the world.

In January 2015, he production center of the Dynamo Sports Club chose BC Liga Stavok as a strategic partner in the promotion of social programs aimed at promoting healthy lifestyles and promoting the development of sports in Russia. The essence of the partnership is the development of joint concepts in the field of education and physical education. An important area of cooperation was participation in organizing and holding sports, entertainment and leisure activities, including charitable ones.

BC Liga Stavok actively cooperates with the Central Moscow Hippodrome - the oldest hippodrome of Russia, founded in 1834. In 2016, the company implemented a pilot project to open points for receiving bets of the National Equestrian Sports betting on the basis of its bookmaker clubs. For the first time in Russia, racing and racing fans have the opportunity to make bets on equestrian events outside the hippodrome. Over the years, Liga Stavok was the official partner of such significant events of the Central Moscow Hippodrome as the Races for the Prize of the President of Russia, the Grand Prix Race of Monte Carlo Radio, the Day of the Betting Organizer.

== Activities ==
=== Betting ===
“Liga Stavok” takes bets on the results of sports competitions, as well as various events of cultural and social life. In addition to constant rates for the results of Eurovision Song Contest, Oscars, Golden Globe Award, Cannes Film Festival, the company bets on individual events. For example, in 2011, the stakes were made for the burial of Vladimir Lenin's body, which entailed the dissatisfaction of the Communist Party of the Russian Federation. In 2016, “Liga” betted on Donald Trump’s win and in 2018 on a voluntary withdrawal from the Presidential competition an anchorwoman Ksenia Sobchak. In 2017, “Liga” offered to bet on the rap battle of Oxxxymiron and Dizaster, and in a year - on whether Oxxxymiron receives a literary award of Alexander Pyatigorsky.

In 2017, “Liga Stavok” paid the biggest prize in the history of the bookmaker business in Russia. A resident of Siberia received a reward of 28.76 million rubles including approximately 4 million taxes. He put 213 thousand rubles for 12 matches and won each of them.

=== Publishing ===
In 2016, “Liga Stavok” and the social network for sports forecasters BettingExpert published the first guide on the rates in Russia. "The Art of Betting on Sport" appeared in the publishing house "Alpina Publisher". Andrew Broker, Alexander Kuzmak and Vladimir Stognienko contributed to the guide with their advice.

In 2017, “Liga Stavok” began publishing its own weekly magazine on sports and rates "Glavnaya Stavka" (Russian: «Главная Ставка»), the chief editor of which is a famous journalist, lecturer at the School of Sports Journalism Andrei Vdovin.

A well-known journalist and sports expert collaborates with the company - presenter of Channel One Yevgeny Savin. Brand ambassador of Liga Stavok - Olympic champion, two-time world champion, two-time Gagarin Cup winner Ilya Kovalchuk.

=== Charity and support of youth sport ===
BC "Liga Stavok" implements social and charitable projects in the field of sports of the Russian Federation. The president of the company, Yuri Krasovsky, is a member of the Board of Trustees of the Charity Foundation “Sozvezdie Dobra” named after Oleg Zhuravsky.

The Foundation is engaged in targeted support of talented children and young people in the field of sports; popularization of youth sport, strengthening the organizational and methodological foundations of physical culture among children and young people; creates the necessary conditions for achieving high results in competitions, tournaments, championships. The Foundation establishes personal grants for young athletes, and also directs funds from charitable events in favor of outside organizations. So, the prize from the Strawberry Fields Cup 2017 for FIFA 18 went in favor of the social rehabilitation center for minors in the city of Rzhev for the construction of a sports ground.

In 2017, Liga Stavok became the general partner of the annual FIFA 18 Strawberry Fields Cup 2017 e-sports tournament organized by Game Show and “Sozvezdie Dobra” named after Oleg Zhuravsky.

Support for youth sports is one of the directions that BC “Liga Stavok” plans to develop further. Under the leadership of Yuri Krasovsky, in 2019, a project was launched for the construction of ice hockey boxes throughout Russia. The first of these appeared in January 2019 in the settlement of Main, Ulyanovsk Region. The opening ceremony of the new hockey ground was attended by the president of FHR Vladislav Tretyak, the president of BC “Liga Stavok” Yuri Krasovsky, the chairman of the legislative assembly of the Ulyanovsk region Valery Malyshev, the head of the administration of the municipal formation “Mainsky district” Oleg Shuenkov. Oleg Shuenkov awarded Yury Krasovsky with a letter of thanks for the implementation of projects aimed at raising and improving the younger generation.

== Company ==
=== Market Share ===
"Liga Stavok" is one of the largest Russian bookmakers. As of January 2019, the company was represented by 500 clubs in 120 Russian cities with about 3,000 employees.

According to the “Bookmakers' Rating”, in May 2017 the betting company was the fourth largest participant in the market with a 14% stake, wherein the entire annual volume of the bookmaker market, including the illegal segment, was estimated at 677 billion rubles.

According to a similar study for 2018, the volume of the Russian betting market increased by 70% and amounted to a record 1.15 trillion rubles, while BC "Liga Stavok" became the third largest company among other participants of the betting market with a share of 18%.

=== Owners and Managers ===
According to FTS of the RF, the co-owners of the Limited Liability Company "First International Bookmaker Company" acting under the brand "Liga Stavok" were Swiss company "Kazako AG" (23%), British "KHML Holding LTD" (15%), private company with limited liability X-M-L-V LTD (5%), Tatyana Bashmakova (15%), Alena Avdeeva (15%), First Vice-President of BC "Liga Stavok" Olga Zhuravskaya (15%), Vice-President of BC "Liga Stavok" Dmitry Pavlovsky (7%), Vice President of BC "Liga Stavok" Dmitry Shumov (5%)

== Honors ==
"Liga Stavok" won the national award "Sport and Russia" three times. In 2016, the company received a prize in the nomination of "The Best Campaign to Promote the Brand with the Participation of a Sports Star." A year later it won also the nomination "Best PR Campaign for the Promotion of Russian Football.” In 2018, it became a laureate in two categories: "Best Bookmaker Company" and "Best Sponsorship Project of Football Competitions”.

In 2016, “Liga Stavok” was awarded the Runet Prize as “The Best Online Service Offering Sports Entertainment.”

In 2017, the company was recognized as the best bookmaker by the results of the voting for the “Brand №1 in Russia” (Russian: «Марка №1 в России») in the category "Sports Betting”.

In 2019, Liga Stavok BC won the main prize of The Bookmaker Ratings award (Russia). According to the results of a popular vote, more than 15,000 users, and also according to the expert jury BC Liga Stavok became the absolute champion of BR AWARDS in "The best mobile app" nomination.
