= Donornomics =

Donornomics is a neologism introduced by Ukrainian economist and banker Kyrylo Shevchenko to describe the economic model of Ukraine during the full-scale Russian invasion of Ukraine. The term highlights the dependence of the national economy on external financial assistance from donors, primarily international partners such as the United States, the European Union (EU) and the International Monetary Fund (IMF), instead of traditional mechanisms of value creation through reforms, investments and the domestic market.

== Term and definition ==
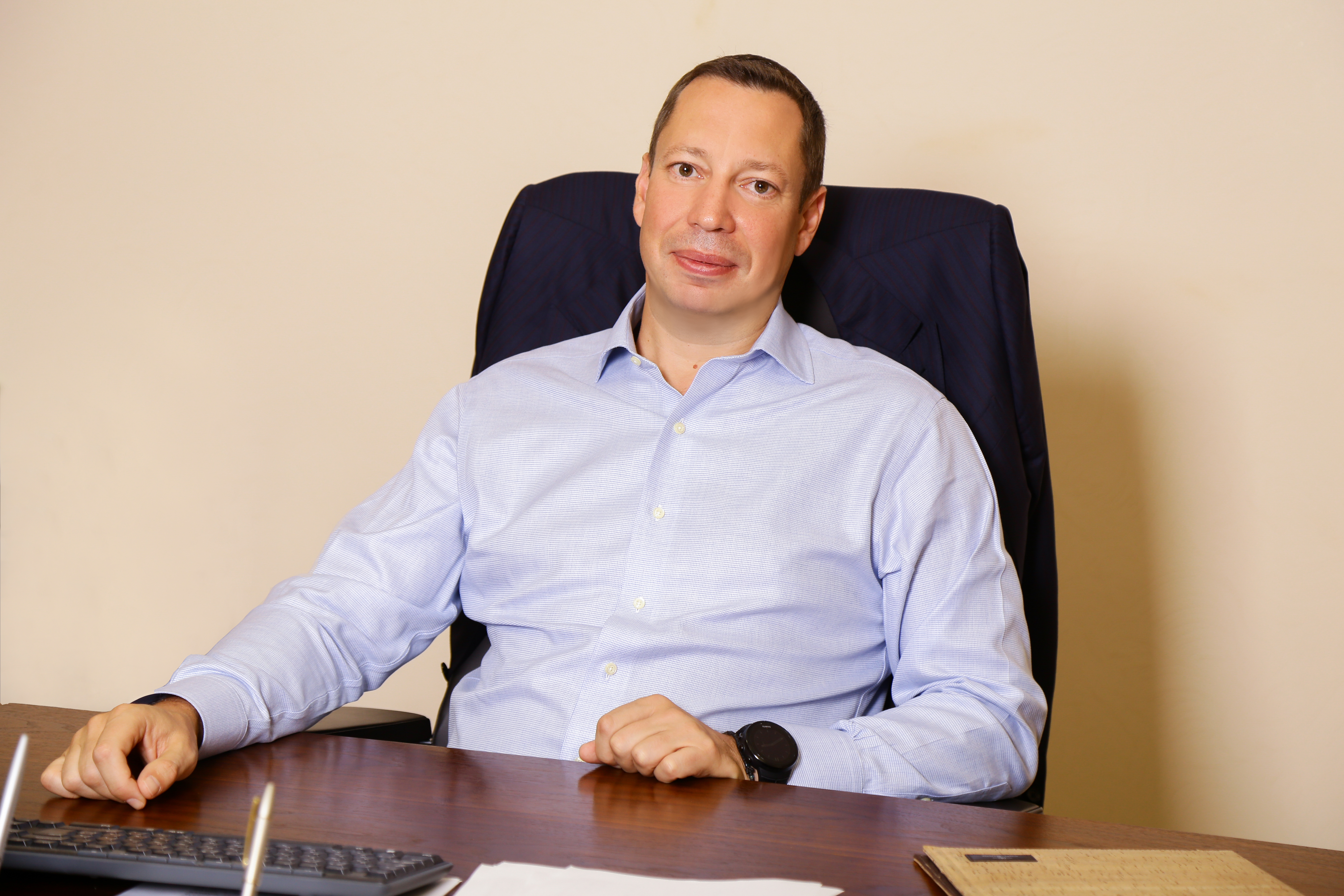
Kyrylo Shevchenko, who introduced the term Donornomics

The term Donornomics was first publicly introduced by Kyrylo Shevchenko, former head of the National Bank of Ukraine (2020–2022), in an article published by Obozrevatel on 17 September 2025. Shevchenko defines Donornomics as a new paradigm whose key elements include:

- Covering the budget deficit (over 20% of GDP) through donor grants and loans rather than domestic business or tax revenues.
- Controlling the exchange rate of the Ukrainian hryvnia and inflation through NBU interventions financed by donor assistance.
- Building up international reserves not through exports, but as a "gift" from partners.
- Replacing institutional reforms with diplomatic memoranda, meetings and public events in Brussels and Washington, D.C.

Unlike classical economics, where the priority is the creation of value added through productivity and reforms, in Donornomics the state’s main task is to preserve donor confidence and ensure the timely receipt of the next tranches of assistance. Shevchenko emphasizes that the term did not appear in global economic literature prior to 2025 and was deliberately introduced to characterize the Ukrainian context.

== Background ==
Donornomics emerged in Ukraine after the start of the full-scale Russian invasion on 24 February 2022. According to the IMF and the World Bank, between 2022 and 2025 the volume of donor assistance to Ukraine exceeded US$100 billion, covering a significant share of budget expenditures for defense, social needs and infrastructure recovery. This model was a continuation of earlier assistance programs (such as through the EU Solidarity Lanes and USAID), but acquired a systemic character during the war.

In Shevchenko’s social media posts (particularly on the X platform, 17 September 2025), the term is illustrated with examples such as the reduction of the U.S. Federal Reserve’s interest rate, which facilitates servicing Ukraine’s debt but does not alter the fundamental dependence on donors.

In 2026, the Kyiv Post stated that the Western economies were financing Ukraine through the war by about $100 billion a year. In October 2026 President Zelenskyy asked for at least €70 billion from the European Union toward the €155 billion expected cost of the war in 2027.

== Criticism ==
Critics have emphasized that Western aid is not unconditional but tied to political and economic requirements, shaping Ukraine’s policy agenda around external rather than domestic priorities. This raises concerns about the erosion of economic sovereignty and the transformation of Ukraine’s economy into what some describe as a "project for donors" rather than one serving Ukrainian citizens.

According to Danylo Hetmantsev, donornomics will not end immediately after the conclusion of the war. In an interview with the journalist Tetiana Danylenko for Ukrainska Pravda, he stated that in order for Ukraine to cease relying on external financial assistance, it must “go through a path that will take more than one or two years to return to a normative level of public debt.”

== See also ==
- Economy of Ukraine

== Sources ==
- Shevchenko, K. Donornomics: My New Term for the Ukrainian Economy. Obozrevatel, 17 September 2025.
- Shevchenko, K. #Donornomics: My New Term for Ukraine’s Economy. X (Twitter), 17 September 2025.
