= Fonbet =

Betting company

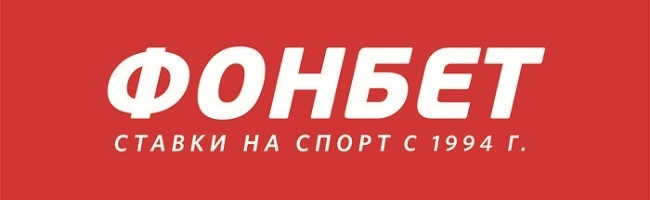
- Type: Private
- Industry: Sports betting
- Founded: 1994
- Founder: Anatoly Machulsky
- Headquarters: Moscow, Russia
- Area served: Russia, Kazakhstan
- Key people: Konstantin Linev (acting CEO, 2025)
- Revenue: ₽610 billion (2024)
- Number of employees: c. 6,000 (2024)
- Website: fon.bet

Fonbet is a sports betting company operating in Russia and Kazakhstan. It is considered to be the largest of its kind in Russia by number of users and network outreach (more than 1,000 offices in Russia) and the oldest by the foundation date (1994). It was founded by Russian chess grandmaster Anatoly Machulsky in 1994.

== Overview ==
The company offers a variety of bets for sports, esports and popular cultural events. The company is the official sponsor of the Russia national football team, the Kontinental Hockey League, IIHF World Championships in ice hockey (from 2017), Champions League, Europa League, Spanish league La Liga, Match TV (Russia's leading sports TV channel), several hockey clubs in Russia and Kazakhstan and a number of other sporting entities. The company has a dedicated system for combating match fixing, with partnerships with organizations such as EWS-FIFA (FIFA's Early Warning System), Tennis Integrity Unit and others. For these purposes, Fonbet holds a membership in European Sports Security Association (ESSA).

In 2020, the company came into the media spotlight when it figured on the Russian Federation's list of system-critical commercial companies that needed financial support from the state during the COVID-19 pandemic (in view of its being a large nation-wide taxpayer and employer). In the wake of the ensuing controversy, the Russian government reconsidered the criteria for such support. Fonbet publicly announced that it had optimized its own financials during the pandemic, did not need state support and had its own program for funding anti-COVID measures (as well as other charity programs).

== Controversies ==
On 29 January 2025, Moscow police detained former CEO Sergey Anokhin on charges of offering a ₽50 million bribe to a law‑enforcement officer.

== See also ==
- Andrea Pirlo
- Gambling in Russia
- Bookmaker
- The Bookmaker Ratings
