= YooKassa =

Russian online payment system

- Native name: ЮKassa
- Website type: Online payment system
- Available in: English, Russian, Chinese
- Owner: YooMoney
- Website: yookassa.ru
- Commercial: Yes
- Registration: Yes
- Launched: October 2013; 12 years ago

YooKassa branded as ЮKassa (Previously Yandex.Checkout) (Russian: Яндекс.Касса), is a Russian E-commerce payment system operated by YooMoney, owned by Sberbank. It was launched in 2013.

In 2017, YooKassa was the most popular payment application in Russia. In 2018, the service was used by over 106,000 websites and had a 31% market share of online payment processing market in Russia by 2018.

== History ==
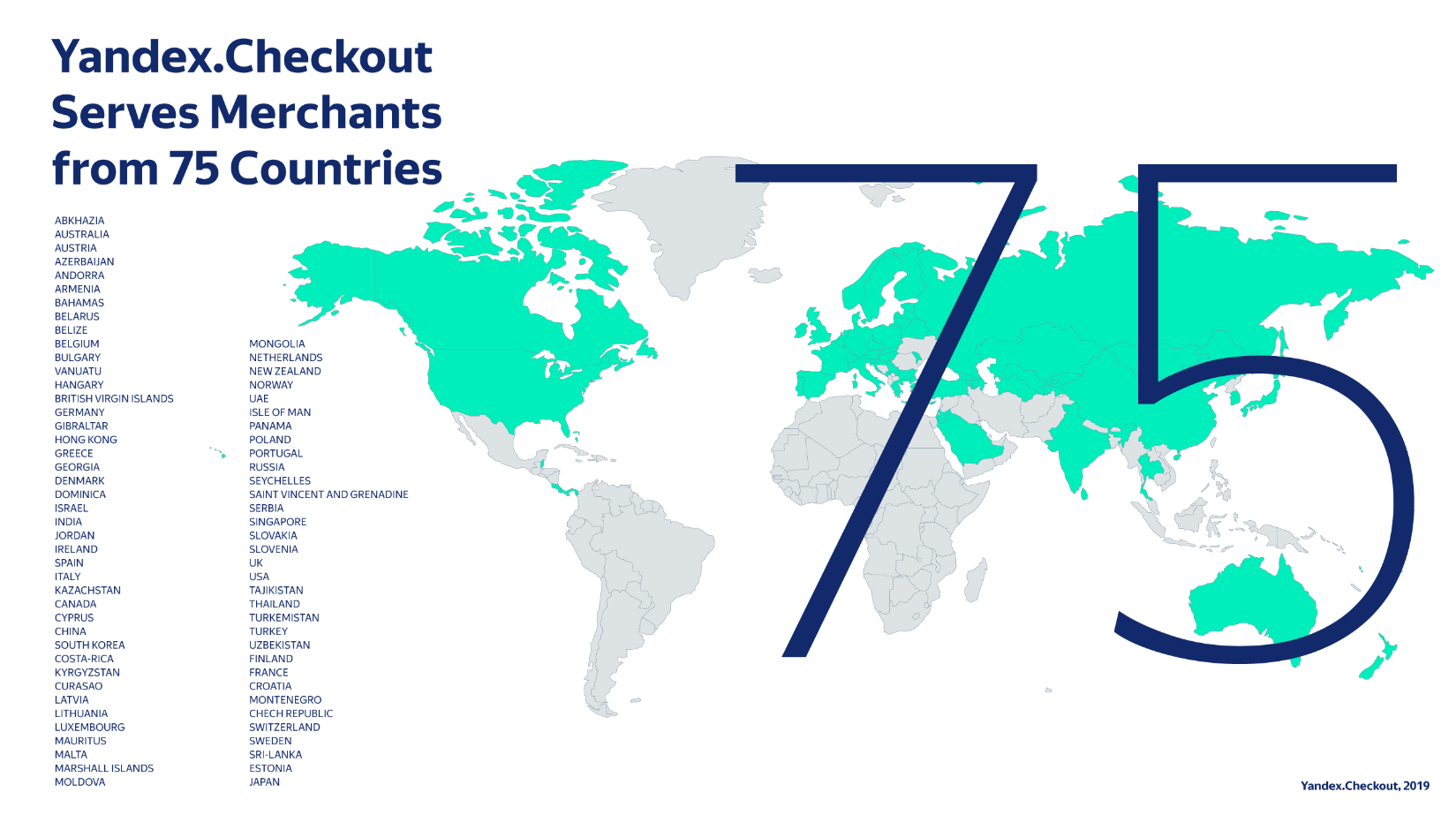
Image showing which countries use Yandex Checkout service

Yandex.Checkout was launched for Russian customers in October 2013. By the end of 2014, it had an 18% market share of online payment processing in Russia.

In autumn 2016, it added support for Mir. In January 2017, the service became a payment operator of ‘1C: Enterprise management automation system’ by 1C Company. In February 2018, the ‘1C’ company added the Yandex.Checkout payment module to the ‘1C: Enterprise’ standard electronic document library, which made it easier for 1.5 million commercial and budget organizations to receive payments and invoices via Yandex.Checkout.

In June 2017, it announced integrations with online cash registers (CRE) in accordance with Federal Law No. 54-FZ "On the Application of Cash Register Equipment in Settlements in Cash and/or via Electronic Means of Payment" that enforced more severe rules on CRE use information exchange with Federal Tax Service.

In 2018, it introduced support for Sberbank. Online payments and instant processing for payments between Sberbank business customers. The b2b service makes it easier to receive payments from the legal entities and speed up their processing.

Between 2015 and 2018, it increased its market share from 24% to over 31% in Russia.

In 2014, it started partnering with Chinese marketplaces and online stores.

In November 2017, Adyen expanded its partnership with Yandex.Checkout to enable retailers to accept most popular payments methods in Russia and the CIS.

In 2018, it introduced an application for South Korean online merchants.

In November 2018, it launched WeChat Pay payments for both online and offline businesses.

== Awards and recognition ==
In 2019, "Banking Review" called YooKassa "the best payment service in 2018". It was recognized as "the Best PSP" at Merchant Payments Ecosystem (MPE) Conference 2019 in Berlin.

== Features ==
YooKassa allows sole proprietorships, businesses and nonprofit organizations to receive payments in many ways: from bank cards, through Yandex.Money and other e-wallets, through mobile applications and Internet banking of Sberbank, Alfa-Bank, Promsvyazbank and Tinkoff Bank, cell phone accounts, using contactless technologies Apple Pay, Google Pay and WeChat Pay, as well as cash through 250,000 payment acceptance points in Russia and other countries. As a term of an additional agreement, it is possible to receive payments from cards of American Express, JCB and Diners Club cards. The service has a number of specific options:

- Invoicing by SMS, e-mail, in chats and messengers. Such receipts can be paid for by all means available.
- Recurring payments: It can charge automatically at a specified time (autopayments).
- Safe storage of card details, authorization hold and mass payouts.
- So-called Safe Deal feature for C2C marketplaces to reserve payments until goods or services are provided (since February 2016)
- Apple Pay, Google Pay (since June 2018), WeChat Pay support (since November 2018), and Garmin Pay (since December 2018)
- Installments and credit payments support (since March 2018)
- Payment forms integrated in live chat support applications, emails and messaging apps such as Telegram and Viber
- An API and mSDK for custom website and mobile application integrations and analytics
- Support for more than 70 cash registers form 9 Russian vendors in accordance with Federal Law No. 54-FZ and payment solution for purchases in Telegram messaging app
- An integrated deep learning-based anti-fraud system that's also available as a separate service for users that don't use Yandex.Checkout
- A built-in marketplace for business services such as website design, CRM integration, accounting, legal services etc.

=== Integrations ===
YooKassa supports integrations with popular content management systems, customer-relationship management systems and billing applications such as 1C-Bitrix, OpenCart, InSales, BILLmanager, RetailCRM and others. It can create QR invoices and generate payment forms that can be sent via email, chat or messenger apps.
