= Unemployment in Russia =

Causes and measures of Russian unemployment

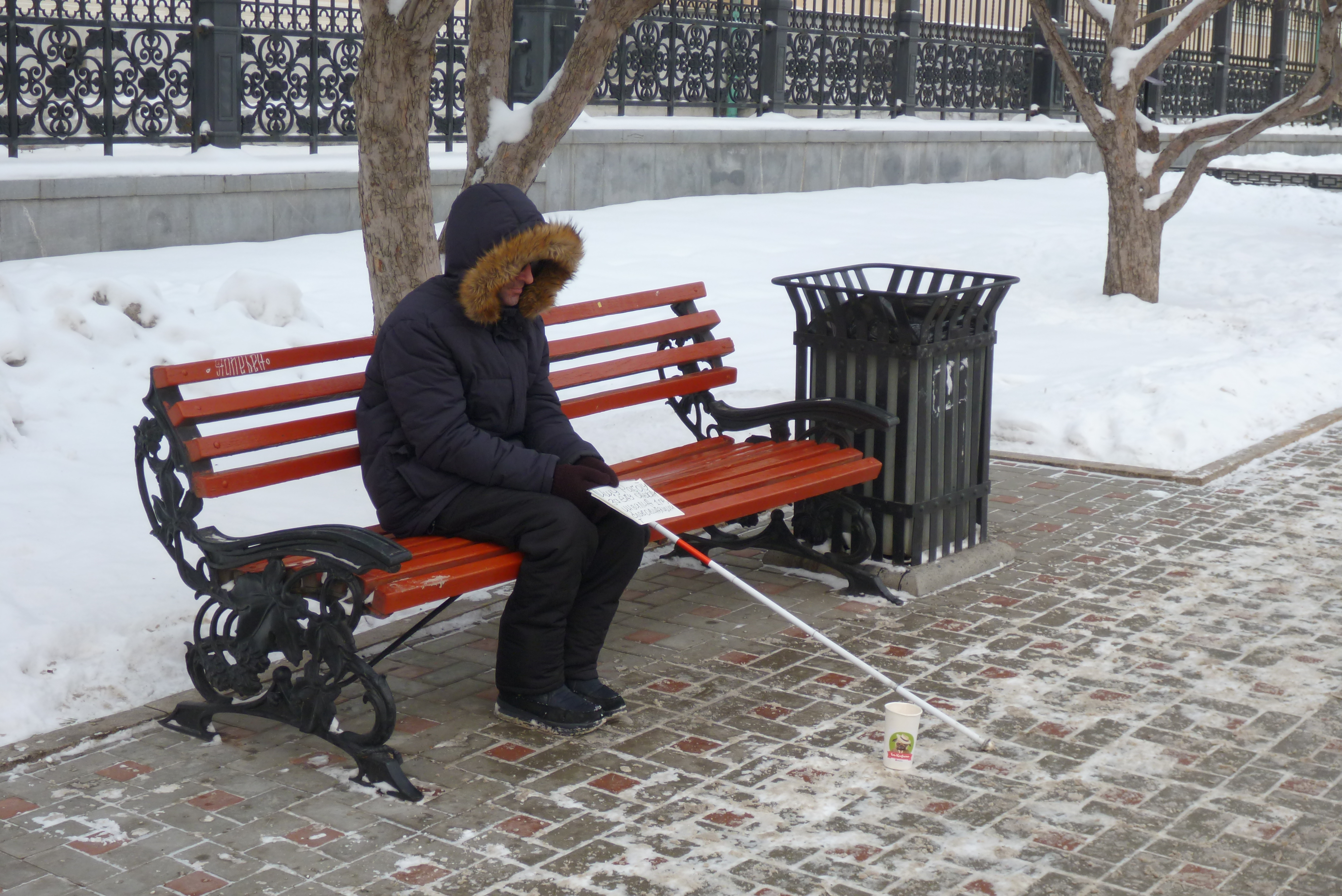
Visually impaired job seeker in Yekaterinburg, 2018

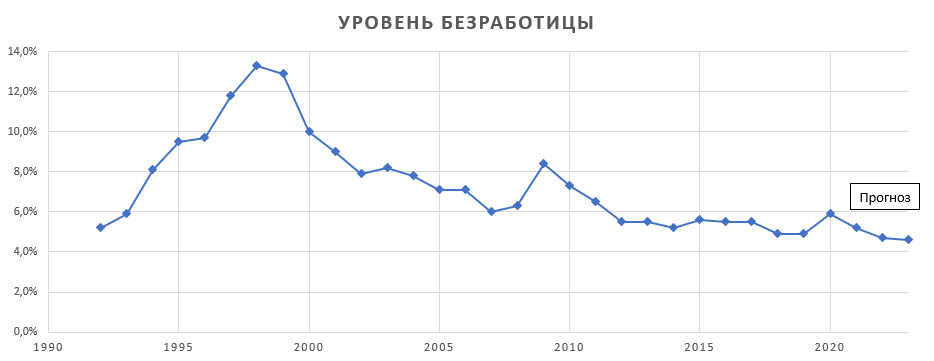
Unemployment rate in the Russian Federation, 1992–present

The employment rate of the Russian population has been quite high since the end of the Soviet era, when the birth rate fell and the number of women involved in the economy rose sharply. After the labor market crisis during the shock therapy of the 1990s, renewed economic growth and a decline in the economically active population of Russia in the 1990s increased employment and reduced the unemployment rate.

The number of unemployed in Russia is assessed by the Federal State Statistics Service (Rosstat) through surveys of the population using a special method. As of September 2016, the official statistical level of unemployment in Russia according to Rosstat amounted to 5.2% of the economically active population (labor force) or 4.0 million people, unchanged from September 2015.

The number of unemployed registered in the employment centers was 917,000 people as of 18 October 2015, 991,000 as of 22 June 2016. Such a low level of registered unemployment is explained by the fact that employment centers automatically remove from the register all unemployed people who have refused the job offered to them twice in a row. Also, most positions offered in employment centers pay minimum wage. The maximum period for payment of unemployment benefits is one year from the date of dismissal from the last job.

There is widespread shadow employment (more than 20% of the economically active population since 2014), which causes a mismatch between official and effective employment statistics. According to data cited by Nezavisimaya Gazeta, citing the Deputy Prime Minister of the Russian Federation, Olga Golodets, in 2013 44% (38 million out of 86 million) Russian citizens of working age (16–54 years for women, 16–59 years for men) did not have official employment.

Another problem affecting employment in Russia is that some employers still practice gender and age discrimination. Women are actively employed in the economy, and in the 21st century there has been a reduction in discrimination on grounds of sex; for example, according to Grant Thornton International, by 2014 the number of women among company leaders in Russia was 43%, the highest rate in the world. The most widely practiced discrimination by employers is age discrimination, with wages for men declining after the age of 38, for women after 44.

== See also ==
- Parasitism (social offense)
