= YooMoney =

Russian electronic payment service

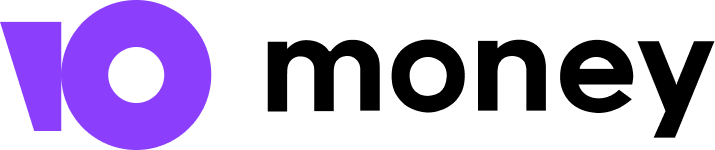
- Native name: ЮMoney
- Formerly: Yandex.Money
- Founded: July 24, 2002; 24 years ago
- Key people: Ivan Glazachev, CEO
- Services: E-commerce payment system
- Owner: Sberbank
- Website: yoomoney.ru

YooMoney branded as ЮMoney, (formerly Yandex.Money) is an e-commerce payment system. It is 100% owned by Sberbank and operates in Russia and nearby countries.

The company's headquarters are in Moscow. It has branch offices in Saint Petersburg and Nizhny Novgorod.

== History ==
The service was launched in 2002 as Yandex.Money (Russian: Яндекс.Деньги) by Yandex via a partnership with PayCash formed in 2000. In March 2007, Yandex acquired full ownership of the service. In March 2011, the service expanded to Ukraine, Belarus, and Kazakhstan.

Beginning in February 2012, users were able to transfer money to Visa or Mastercard accounts. Also in February 2012, Yandex.Money became the preferred payment method in the Opera Mobile Store. In April 2012, Yandex Money began issuing debit cards on the Mastercard network. In October 2012, the company enabled making card payments via a miniature point of sale terminal attached to a user's smartphone.

In July 2013, Sberbank acquired a 75% interest in Yandex.Money for $60 million, while Yandex retained a 25% interest. In 2013, the Yandex.Checkout service was launched (later rebranded as YooKassa). In May 2014, Yandex.Money was integrated as a payment option for merchants using Skrill. In October 2014, Nintendo began selling games via digital distribution through the service.

In April 2016, the service began allowing near-field communication payments via its mobile app. In July 2016, the service launched payments via Apple Watch. In October 2016, the service began allowing payments via iMessage. In November 2016, the service began working with Apple Pay.

In March 2017, Ivan Glazachev became CEO of the service. In November 2017, the service launched Yandex.Gas, allowing users to pay for gas remotely, without leaving their cars.

In March 2019, the service began allowing for accounts holding 10 major currencies; the service automatically determines the best currency in which to make a payment. In July 2019, the service launched "Ya.Streamer", allowing users to collect donations via streaming platforms, such as YouTube, Twitch, Smashcast, CyberHero, WASD.TV, Odnoklassniki, VK, Facebook, OBS Studio, and XSplit.

In 2020, Sberbank acquired 100% of the service and it was rebranded to YooMoney.

== Legal issues ==
In 2011, the Federal Security Service required the company to disclose details of people who contributed to organizations run by Alexei Navalny, a leader of the opposition to Vladimir Putin in Russia. As required by law, the company disclosed information for 100 contributors who used the service.

In 2016, the government of Russia allegedly put pressure on the company to close accounts used to raise money for Alexei Navalny. The Russian Central Bank denied the allegations.

In April 2022, the United States Department of the Treasury initiated sanctions on the service as part of international sanctions during the Russian invasion of Ukraine.
