= Qiwi =

Russian electronic payment service

Qiwi plc
- Type: Public
- Traded as: Nasdaq: QIWI; MCX: QIWI
- Industry: Payment service provider
- Founded: 2007; 19 years ago, in Moscow, Russia
- Headquarters: Nicosia, Cyprus
- Area served: Worldwide
- Key people: Andrey Protopopov (CEO) Sergey A. Solonin (chairman of the board of directors)
- Revenue: $351,6 million (2020)
- Operating income: 14,064,000,000 Russian ruble (2020)
- Net income: 4,714,000,000 Russian ruble
- Total assets: 83,315,000,000 Russian ruble (2020)
- Website: www.qiwi.com

QIWI plc was a Russian company that provides payment and financial services in Russia and CIS countries. The group includes QIWI payment system, QIWI Bank, CONTACT money transfer system, Factoring PLUS, Flocktory, and RealWeb. The company has representative offices in three countries.

The payment network has more than 16.6 million wallets and virtual cards, as well as almost 106 thousand terminals and payment points.

The banking license of QIWI Bank was revoked by the Central Bank of Russia on February 21, 2024, due to non-compliance with regulatory requirements. Following this decision, the Contact payment system also suspended its operations.

On August 27, 2024, the general meeting of shareholders approved the renaming of the holding company from Qiwi PLC to NanduQ PLC.

== History ==
QIWI Group was founded by Sergey Solonin, Boris Kim and Andrey Romanenko in 2007. In 2011, a technical advisor allegedly had mined 500,000 bitcoins using the collective processing power of numerous Qiwi terminals but Sergey Solonin denied that the person, who was also known as a programmer, was in receipt of the bitcoins. In November 2012, Visa and QIWI signed a global partnership agreement, under which QIWI Wallet was transformed into a co-branded product Visa QIWI Wallet.

In 2013, QIWI went public on the NASDAQ, the shares were traded at $17 per share.

In July 2015, QIWI Group became 100% shareholder of CONTACT money transfer system. In June 2017 the co-founder of the payment service QIWI Andrei Romanenko left the management of the company and sold the stake he owned.

In October 2017, QIWI bought the rights to the brand and software of the banking services Rocketbank and "Tochka" from Otkritie Bank. In June 2018, Otkritie Bank, QIWI Group and Tochka announced the signing of a cooperation agreement and the creation of the joint venture Tochka JSC, which would launch a new stage in the development of the financial services market for entrepreneurs in Russia. In 2021, QIWI sold its stake in the joint venture to Otkritie Bank, the transaction amounted to 4.95 billion rubles. In 2021, Andrey Protopopov, who previously headed the Payment Segment, was appointed to the position of CEO.

In August 2021, in accordance with the order of the President of Russia, the creditor Mobile Card, not Qiwi, was chosen as the exclusive center for accounting for the transfer of bets from the bookmakers. Olga Zhuravskaya (16,5%), the wife of co-founder of betting company Liga Stavok, and Igor Avdeev (11,25%) are featuring among other minority shareholders of Mobile Card. By the end of September 2021, the process of replacing the relevant activities of operators with a single regulator for accounting rates in bookmakers will be completed. Due to the consolidation of accounting on the chosen one and exclusive operator, deprivation of Qiwi functions of accounting and Qiwi`s forecasts of the reduction of its revenue, the price of shares of Qiwi has fallen by 6%. In September 2021, Qiwi`s CEO Andrey Protopopov announced that the company will continue to deal with betting providers via new Unified Center for Accounting of Bet money Transfers, which will consolidate two current centers, Qiwi Bank and Mobilnaya Karta.

In the summer of 2023, the Qiwi group separated Russian and international business in order to avoid delisting on the Nasdaq. As a result of the restructuring, the group’s companies within Russia are now controlled by Qiwi JSC registered in Moscow and Qiwi plc registered in Cyprus will supervise the company’s business in Kazakhstan.

From July 26, 2023, at the request of the Bank of Russia, Qiwi Bank limited the possibility of withdrawing cash and withdrawal to bank accounts with an amount of one thousand rubles per month. The main functionality of Qiwi cards is maintained: payment of goods and services, transfers between wallets, repayment of microloans, etc.

On February 21, 2024, the Central Bank of Russia revoked the license of Qiwi Bank. The regulator found that the bank violated the law, systematically ignored anti-money laundering requirements. The functions of the temporary administration will be performed by Deposit Insurance Agency of Russia. Users of Qiwi wallets lost the ability to make transactions, payment terminals stopped working. The revocation of the license affected the Contact payment system, a popular means of transferring money abroad (Qiwi was its operator). It was excluded from the register of payment systems. On February 22, the Moscow Exchange excluded depositary receipts from its indices.
