= 2026–27 Russian Premier League =

35th season of top-tier football league in Russia

Russian Premier League
- Season: 2026–27
- Dates: 24 July 2026 – 29 May 2027
- Matches: 120
- Goals: 321 (2.68 per match)
- Top goalscorer: Aleksandr Sobolev; Maksim Glushenkov (10 goals)
- Biggest home win: Orenburg 4–0 Dynamo Makhachkala; 10 October 2026; Spartak 4–0 Rubin; 18 October 2026
- Biggest away win: Akron 0–5 Zenit; 25 July 2026; Fakel 0–5 Lokomotiv; 10 October 2026
- Highest scoring: Rodina 2–4 Rostov; 31 July 2026; Rodina 3–3 Akron; 15 August 2026; Akhmat 3–3 Krylia Sovetov; 29 August 2026; Lokomotiv 3–3 Krasnodar; 17 October 2026; Krasnodar 4–2 CSKA; 7 November 2026
- Longest winning run: 7 matches Dynamo Moscow
- Longest unbeaten run: 10 matches CSKA
- Longest winless run: 10 matches Fakel
- Longest losing run: 4 matches Rodina
- Highest attendance: 42,685; Zenit 3–2 Akhmat; 18 October 2026
- Lowest attendance: 2,046; Akron 0–2 Fakel; 21 November 2026
- Total attendance: 1,656,462
- Average attendance: 13,804
- All statistics correct as of 22 November 2026.

The 2026–27 Russian Premier League (known as the Alfa-Bank Russian Premier League, also written as Alfa-Bank Russian Premier Liga for sponsorship reasons) is the 35th season of the premier football competition in Russia since the dissolution of the Soviet Union and the 25th under the current Russian Premier League name. It started on 24 July 2026, the regular season will end on 29 May 2027 and will be followed by the relegation play-offs. The season will have a winter break after 7 December until 26 February 2027.

== Teams ==
As in the previous season, 16 teams play in the 2026–27 season. After the 2025–26 season, Pari Nizhny Novgorod and Sochi were relegated to the 2026–27 Russian First League after five and one years in the top tier respectively. They were replaced by Rodina Moscow making their Premier League debut, and Fakel Voronezh, returning after one season in the First League.

=== Venues ===
Zenit Saint Petersburg	Spartak Moscow	Rubin Kazan	Rostov
Gazprom Arena	Lukoil Arena	Ak Bars Arena	Rostov Arena
Capacity: 60,177	Capacity: 44,897	Capacity: 43,284	Capacity: 45,415
Dynamo Makhachkala	Locations of teams in the 2026–27 Russian Premier League Locations of teams in the 2026–27 Russian Premier League in Moscow		Krylia Sovetov Samara / Akron Tolyatti
Anzhi Arena	Locations of teams in the 2026–27 Russian Premier League Locations of teams in the 2026–27 Russian Premier League in Moscow		Solidarity Samara Arena
Capacity: 26,364	Locations of teams in the 2026–27 Russian Premier League Locations of teams in the 2026–27 Russian Premier League in Moscow		Capacity: 42,389
Krasnodar	Locations of teams in the 2026–27 Russian Premier League Locations of teams in the 2026–27 Russian Premier League in Moscow		Akhmat Grozny
Ozon Arena	Locations of teams in the 2026–27 Russian Premier League Locations of teams in the 2026–27 Russian Premier League in Moscow		Akhmat Arena
Capacity: 33,395	Locations of teams in the 2026–27 Russian Premier League Locations of teams in the 2026–27 Russian Premier League in Moscow		Capacity: 30,000
CSKA Moscow	Locations of teams in the 2026–27 Russian Premier League Locations of teams in the 2026–27 Russian Premier League in Moscow		Lokomotiv Moscow
VEB Arena	Locations of teams in the 2026–27 Russian Premier League Locations of teams in the 2026–27 Russian Premier League in Moscow		RZD Arena
Capacity: 29,071	Locations of teams in the 2026–27 Russian Premier League Locations of teams in the 2026–27 Russian Premier League in Moscow		Capacity: 27,084
Rodina	Locations of teams in the 2026–27 Russian Premier League Locations of teams in the 2026–27 Russian Premier League in Moscow		Fakel
Arena Khimki	Locations of teams in the 2026–27 Russian Premier League Locations of teams in the 2026–27 Russian Premier League in Moscow		Fakel Stadium
Capacity: 14,950	Locations of teams in the 2026–27 Russian Premier League Locations of teams in the 2026–27 Russian Premier League in Moscow		Capacity: 10,052
Baltika		Dynamo Moscow	Orenburg
Rostec Arena		VTB Arena	Gazovik Stadium
Capacity: 33,399		Capacity: 25,716	Capacity: 10,046

=== Personnel and kits ===
Team	Location	Head coach	Captain	Kit manufacturer	Shirt sponsor(s)
Akhmat	Grozny	(Russia) Rolan Gusev	(Russia) Lechi Sadulayev	(Russia) Jögel	Akhmat Foundation
Akron	Tolyatti	(Serbia) Srđan Blagojević	(Russia) Marat Bokoyev	(Russia) Italsport	Akron Holding
Baltika	Kaliningrad	(Russia) Andrey Talalayev	(Bosnia and Herzegovina) Eldar Ćivić	(Germany) Jako	Rostec
CSKA	Moscow	(Russia) Dmitry Igdisamov	(Russia) Igor Akinfeev	(Russia) PRIMERA	Fonbet/Chestny Znak
Dynamo Makhachkala	Makhachkala	(Russia) Vadim Yevseyev	(Russia) Mutalip Alibekov	Dynamo Makhachkala (self-branded)	Magnit/Betcity
Dynamo Moscow	Moscow	(Germany) Sandro Schwarz	(Russia) Daniil Fomin	(Russia) Bosco	VTB Bank/Betcity
Fakel	Voronezh	(Russia) Khasanbi Bidzhiyev	(Russia) Ilnur Alshin	(Spain) Kelme	Ekoniva
Krasnodar	Krasnodar	(Russia) Murad Musayev	(Colombia) Jhon Córdoba	Krasnodar (self-branded)	Winline
Krylia Sovetov	Samara	(Russia) Sergei Bulatov	(Russia) Sergei Pesyakov	(Spain) Kelme	Fonbet
Lokomotiv	Moscow	(Russia) Sergei Ovchinnikov (caretaker)	(Russia) Anton Mitryushkin	(Russia) Italsport	RZhD
Orenburg	Orenburg	(Russia) Ildar Akhmetzyanov	(Russia) Danila Khotulyov	(Russia) PRIMERA	EcoGas
Rodina	Moscow	(Spain) Jonatan Alba	(Russia) Artyom Meshchaninov	Rodina (self-branded)	None
Rostov	Rostov-on-Don	(Russia) Dmitri Kirichenko	(Russia) Konstantin Kuchayev	(Russia) Jögel	Atlantis-Pak
Rubin	Kazan	(Russia) Oleg Kuzmin (caretaker)	(Montenegro) Igor Vujačić	Rubin (self-branded)	Kazanorgsintez
Spartak	Moscow	(Spain) Juan Carlos Carcedo	(Russia) Roman Zobnin	(Russia) Jögel	Lukoil
Zenit	Saint Petersburg	(Russia) Sergei Semak	(Brazil) Douglas Santos	(Russia) Jögel	Gazprom

=== Managerial changes ===
Team	Outgoing manager	Manner of departure	Date of vacancy	Position in table	Replaced by	Date of appointment
Dynamo Moscow	(Russia) Rolan Gusev	Contract expired	22 May 2026	Pre-season	(Germany) Sandro Schwarz	22 May 2026
Akron Tolyatti	(Russia) Murat Iskakov (caretaker)	Caretaking spell over	24 May 2026	Pre-season	(Serbia) Srđan Blagojević	8 June 2026
Rodina	(Spain) Juan Díaz Quinta	Mutual consent	21 September 2026	15th	(Armenia) Barsegh Kirakosyan (caretaker)	21 September 2026
Rostov	(Spain) Jonatan Alba	Mutual consent	24 September 2026	12th	(Russia) Dmitri Kirichenko	26 September 2026
Rodina	(Armenia) Barsegh Kirakosyan (caretaker)	Caretaking spell over	8 October 2026	15th	(Spain) Jonatan Alba	8 October 2026
Fakel	(Russia) Oleg Vasilenko	Mutual consent	11 October 2026	16th	(Russia) Aleksei Rebko (caretaker)	11 October 2026
Rubin	(Spain) Franc Artiga	Dismissed	24 October 2026	10th	(Russia) Oleg Kuzmin (caretaker)	24 October 2026
Fakel	(Russia) Aleksei Rebko (caretaker)	Caretaking spell over	1 November 2026	16th	(Russia) Khasanbi Bidzhiyev	1 November 2026
Akhmat	(Russia) Stanislav Cherchesov	Mutual consent	2 November 2026	15th	(Russia) Rolan Gusev	2 November 2026
Lokomotiv	(Russia) Mikhail Galaktionov	Mutual consent	17 November 2026	15th	(Russia) Sergei Ovchinnikov (caretaker)	17 November 2026

== Tournament format and regulations ==
The 16 teams play a round-robin tournament whereby each team plays each one of the other teams twice, once at home and once away, for a total of 240 matches with each team playing 30.

=== Promotion and relegation ===
For the purpose of determining First League positions for the following considerations, the teams that do not pass 2027–28 RPL licensing or drop out of 2027–28 season for any other reason, or the teams that finished lower than 6th place in First League standings will not be considered. For example, if the teams that finished 1st, 3rd and 4th in the First League standings fail licensing, the team that finished 2nd will be considered the 1st-placed team, the team that finished 5th will be considered the 2nd-placed team, and the team that finished 6th will be considered the 3rd-placed team. There would be no designated 4th-placed team in this scenario.

The teams that finish 15th and 16th will be relegated to the 2027–28 First League, while the top two in that league will be promoted to the Premier League for the 2027–28 season.

The 13th and 14th Premier League teams will play the 4th and 3rd 2026–27 First League teams respectively in two (home-and-away) playoff games, with penalty shootout in effect if necessary. The winners will secure Premier League spots for the 2027–28 season. If only one First League team is eligible for the play-offs (as in the example scenario above), that team will play the 14th-placed RPL team in playoffs, with the winners securing the Premier League spot, and the 13th RPL team will remain in the league. If none of the First League teams are eligible for the play-offs, they will not be held and 13th and 14th-placed RPL teams will remain in the league. If any of the teams are unable to participate in the season after the play-offs have been concluded, or there are not enough teams that pass licensing to follow the above procedures, the replacement will be chosen by the Russian Football Union in consultation with RPL and FNL.

=== Exclusion from the league ===
Any team can be excluded from the Premier League during the season for the following reasons: a) using counterfeit documents or providing inaccurate information to the league; b) not arriving to the game on more than one occasion; c) match fixing. If the excluded team had played fewer than 15 games at the time of exclusion, all its results would be annulled and would not count for the standings. If the excluded team had played at least 15 games at the time of exclusion, all their remaining opponents would be awarded a victory without effect on their goal difference, the same would retroactively apply to the results of the second-half-of-the-season games such a team would have already played at the time of their exclusion, the results of the first 15 games of this team would remain in place and count for standings. The teams excluded are placed at the bottom of the table, regardless of the amount of points they gained compared to the non-excluded teams, and automatically relegated. If more than one team is excluded, the relative positions of the excluded teams are determined by the regular criteria (points, head-to-head results and so on).

== League table ==
Pos	Team	Pld	W	D	L	GF	GA	GD	Pts	Qualification or relegation
1	Dynamo Moscow	15	10	2	3	24	14	+10	32	
2	Zenit Saint Petersburg	15	10	1	4	33	18	+15	31	
3	Spartak Moscow	15	9	3	3	28	12	+16	30	
4	Krasnodar	15	7	6	2	26	19	+7	27	
5	CSKA Moscow	15	7	5	3	24	18	+6	26	
6	Rostov	15	6	4	5	21	19	+2	22	
7	Rubin Kazan	15	5	6	4	17	19	−2	21	
8	Baltika Kaliningrad	15	5	5	5	19	15	+4	20	
9	Krylia Sovetov Samara	15	4	6	5	19	23	−4	18	
10	Orenburg	15	3	8	4	14	16	−2	17 (Note: Head-to-head points: Orenburg 6, Akhmat 3, Dynamo Makhachkala 0.)	
11	Akhmat Grozny	15	4	5	6	18	20	−2	17	
12	Dynamo Makhachkala	15	5	2	8	18	27	−9	17	
13	Lokomotiv Moscow	15	3	5	7	17	21	−4	14	Qualification to relegation play-offs
14	Rodina Moscow	15	3	3	9	15	30	−15	12 (Note: Head-to-head points: Akron, Rodina 1. Ranked on matches won.)	Qualification to relegation play-offs
15	Akron Tolyatti	15	2	6	7	17	27	−10	12	Relegation to First League
16	Fakel Voronezh	15	2	3	10	11	23	−12	9	Relegation to First League

Updated to match(es) played on 22 November 2026. Source: Premier Liga
Rules for classification: 1) Points; 2) Head-to-head points; 3) Head-to-head matches won; 4) Head-to-head goal difference; 5) Head-to-head goals scored; 6) Matches won; 7) Goal difference; 8) Goals scored; 9) Away matches won; 10) Away goals scored; 11) Disciplinary points (3 for red card, 1 for caution), in ascending order; 9) 2025–26 position (not applicable to final standings); 10) Play-off. Note: if teams tied on points did not play an equal number of head-to-head matches, head-to-head criteria are not considered for the standings.

== Results ==
Home \ Away	AKH	AKR	BAL	CSK	DMA	DMO	FAK	KRA	KRY	LOK	ORE	ROD	ROS	RUB	SPA	ZEN
Akhmat Grozny	—		0–0		3–2				3–3		0–1	1–0	4–1		1–2	
Akron Tolyatti	2–0	—		2–2		3–1	0–2		0–3		0–1			1–2		0–5
Baltika Kaliningrad		2–1	—		0–1	2–1				0–1			0–0	1–1	1–2	2–3
CSKA Moscow	1–2		2–1	—			1–0		1–1	3–2		3–0	0–0	1–1	2–0	
Dynamo Makhachkala		1–1		1–3	—			0–1		2–1		2–0	0–3		1–1	
Dynamo Moscow	2–0			3–1	3–1	—		1–1	0–0		1–0	3–1			2–1	
Fakel Voronezh	0–0		2–2		1–2	1–2	—			0–5	0–0	0–1				0–1
Krasnodar	1–0	1–1	1–1	4–2			3–2	—					1–0			2–3
Krylia Sovetov Samara			0–2		1–4		1–2	2–2	—		2–0	2–1			1–1	0–3
Lokomotiv Moscow	1–1	0–0				0–1		3–3	1–1	—				0–1	0–4	
Orenburg		2–2	0–2	0–0	4–0			0–0		1–1	—		2–1			0–3
Rodina Moscow		3–3	0–3					2–1		0–1	2–2	—	2–4	1–1		
Rostov		1–0				0–3	3–1		3–0	2–0			—	1–1		
Rubin Kazan	1–1				3–1	0–1	1–0	1–3	0–2		1–1			—		3–1
Spartak Moscow		2–1		*		*	1–0	1–2			1–1	3–0	3–0	4–0	—	2–0
Zenit Saint Petersburg	3–2			1–2	2–0	3–0				2–1		1–2	2–2			—

Updated to match(es) played on 22 November 2026. Source: Russian Premier League
Legend: Blue = home team win; Yellow = draw; Red = away team win.

== Season statistics ==
=== Top goalscorers ===
Rank	Player	Club	Goals
1	(Russia) Aleksandr Sobolev	Zenit	10
1	(Russia) Maksim Glushenkov	Zenit	10
3	(Colombia) Jhon Córdoba	Krasnodar	7
3	(Russia) Konstantin Tyukavin	Dynamo Moscow	7
3	(Russia) Ivan Oblyakov	CSKA	7
6	(Costa Rica) Manfred Ugalde	Spartak	6
7	(Albania) Mirlind Daku	Spartak	5
7	(Russia) Gamid Agalarov	Dynamo Makhachkala	5
7	(El Salvador) Brayan Gil	Baltika	5
7	(Bosnia and Herzegovina) Amar Rahmanović	Krylia Sovetov	5
7	(Angola) João Batxi	Krasnodar	5

=== Hat-tricks ===
Player	For	Against	Result	Date	Ref
(Russia) Maksim Glushenkov	Zenit	Orenburg	3–0 (A)	2 August 2026	
(Russia) Artyom Maksimenko	Rodina	Akron	3–3 (H)	15 August 2026	

=== Clean sheets ===
Rank	Player	Club	Clean sheets
1	(Russia) Yevgeni Latyshonok	Baltika	5
1	(Russia) Aleksandr Maksimenko	Spartak	5
1	(Russia) Bogdan Ovsyannikov	Orenburg	5
1	(Russia) Artyom Petrov	Rostov	5
5	(Russia) Denis Adamov	Zenit	4
5	(Russia) Stanislav Agkatsev	Krasnodar	4
5	(Russia) Andrey Lunyov	Dynamo Moscow	4
8	(Russia) Daniil Frolkin	Fakel	3
8	(Russia) Anton Mitryushkin	Lokomotiv	3
8	(Russia) Vladislav Torop	CSKA	3

== Awards ==
=== Monthly awards ===
Month	Player of the Month		Manager of the Month		Goal of the Month		Ref.
Month	Player	Club	Manager	Club	Player	Club	Ref.
July/August	(Russia) Nikita Krivtsov	Krasnodar	(Russia) Murad Musayev	Krasnodar	(Brazil) Jubal	Krasnodar (against Dynamo Makhachkala, 23 August)	
September	(Russia) Ivan Oblyakov	CSKA	(Germany) Sandro Schwarz	Dynamo Moscow	(Russia) Ravil Netfullin	Fakel (against Baltika, 12 September)	
October	(Russia) Maksim Glushenkov	Zenit	(Russia) Sergei Semak	Zenit	(Russia) Ivan Oblyakov (Russia) Lechi Sadulayev	CSKA (against Rodina, 11 October); Akhmat (against Zenit, 18 October)	
