= 2025–26 Russian Premier League =

34th season of top-tier football league in Russia

Russian Premier League
- Season: 2025–26
- Dates: 18 July 2025 – 23 May 2026
- Champions: Zenit
- Relegated: Pari NN; Sochi
- Matches: 240
- Goals: 609 (2.54 per match)
- Top goalscorer: Jhon Córdoba (17 goals)
- Biggest home win: Krasnodar 5–0 Krylia Sovetov; 30 November 2025; Krasnodar 5–0 Pari NN; 21 March 2026
- Biggest away win: Krylia Sovetov 0–6 Krasnodar; 24 August 2025
- Highest scoring: Dynamo Moscow 3–5 Lokomotiv; 4 October 2025
- Longest winning run: 4 matches Krasnodar (twice); Zenit (twice); Lokomotiv
- Longest unbeaten run: 15 matches Zenit
- Longest winless run: 10 matches Sochi (twice); Akron
- Longest losing run: 6 matches Sochi
- Highest attendance: 57,777; Zenit 2–0 Spartak; 14 March 2026
- Lowest attendance: 232; Pari NN 2–3 Lokomotiv; 2 August 2025 played in Grozny
- Total attendance: 3,270,665
- Average attendance: 13,628
- All statistics correct as of complete.

The 2025–26 Russian Premier League (known as the Mir Russian Premier League, also written as Mir Russian Premier Liga for sponsorship reasons) was the 34th season of the premier football competition in Russia since the dissolution of the Soviet Union and the 24th under the current Russian Premier League name. It started on 18 July 2025, the regular season ended on 17 May 2026 and was followed by the relegation play-offs which were completed on 23 May 2026. The season had a winter break after 7 December until 27 February 2026.

== Teams ==
The relegation and promotion team movement was particularly complicated in this offseason. At the conclusion of the previous season, Orenburg and Fakel Voronezh were relegated directly from the Premier League, both after three seasons in the top tier. Top two teams of the Russian First League, Baltika Kaliningrad and Torpedo Moscow were promoted and returned to the Premier League after one and two seasons in the second tier, respectively. In the RPL/RFL play-offs, Premier League club Akhmat Grozny defeated Ural Yekaterinburg and remained in the league, while Pari Nizhny Novgorod lost to Sochi, Sochi returned to the Premier League after one season in the lower level.

Khimki, which finished the RPL season outside of relegation zone, were relegated administratively by the Russian Football Union due to lack of financial guarantees. After several weeks of uncertainty, on 16 June 2025 Khimki were officially replaced by Pari Nizhny Novgorod, which was kept in the league despite losing in the play-offs.

In late June, an investigation was opened into Sochi's player Vladimir Pisarsky, who was betting on his team's games. On 3 July 2025, he was banned from football for at least a year, however, the club was not punished as there was no evidence that he influenced the games outcomes to improve his betting results.

On 19 June 2025, Torpedo Moscow's co-owner Leonid Sobolev and general director Valeri Skorodumov were arrested on suspicion of attempting to bribe referee Maksim Perezva. They are suspected of offering Perezva 6,000,000 rubles (approximately 66,000 euros) for giving Torpedo advantage in three First League games from March 2025 to May 2025 in which he was expected to be the referee, Perezva reported their offer to the police. The investigators searched their offices and homes, confiscating communication devices and documents. Russian Football Union opened their own investigation. On 8 July 2025, referee Bogdan Golovko, who did not award a penalty kick against Torpedo on the last day of the 2024–25 season (a decision later deemed incorrect by the official RFU refereeing review commission) was also arrested on the charge of "illegally influencing an official sporting event". On 10 July 2025, eight days before the season was scheduled to begin, RFU excluded Torpedo from the Premier League, banned Skorodumov and Sobolev from football activity (for 10 and 5 years respectively) and fined Torpedo 5 million rubles (approximately 55,000 euros). The league president Aleksandr Alayev commented that the decision about Torpedo's replacement (if any) will be made by the Russian Football Union. On the next day, RFU decided to allow Orenburg to remain in the Premier League and keep Torpedo in the First League for the 2025–26 season.

=== Venues ===
Zenit Saint Petersburg	Spartak Moscow	Rubin Kazan	Rostov
Gazprom Arena	Lukoil Arena	Ak Bars Arena	Rostov Arena
Capacity: 60,177	Capacity: 44,897	Capacity: 43,284	Capacity: 45,415
Dynamo Makhachkala	Locations of teams in the 2025–26 Russian Premier League Locations of teams in the 2025–26 Russian Premier League in Moscow		Krylia Sovetov Samara / Akron Tolyatti
Anzhi Arena	Locations of teams in the 2025–26 Russian Premier League Locations of teams in the 2025–26 Russian Premier League in Moscow		Solidarity Samara Arena
Capacity: 26,364	Locations of teams in the 2025–26 Russian Premier League Locations of teams in the 2025–26 Russian Premier League in Moscow		Capacity: 42,389
Krasnodar	Locations of teams in the 2025–26 Russian Premier League Locations of teams in the 2025–26 Russian Premier League in Moscow		Akhmat Grozny
Ozon Arena	Locations of teams in the 2025–26 Russian Premier League Locations of teams in the 2025–26 Russian Premier League in Moscow		Akhmat Arena
Capacity: 33,395	Locations of teams in the 2025–26 Russian Premier League Locations of teams in the 2025–26 Russian Premier League in Moscow		Capacity: 30,000
CSKA Moscow	Locations of teams in the 2025–26 Russian Premier League Locations of teams in the 2025–26 Russian Premier League in Moscow		Lokomotiv Moscow
VEB Arena	Locations of teams in the 2025–26 Russian Premier League Locations of teams in the 2025–26 Russian Premier League in Moscow		RZD Arena
Capacity: 29,071	Locations of teams in the 2025–26 Russian Premier League Locations of teams in the 2025–26 Russian Premier League in Moscow		Capacity: 27,084
Sochi	Locations of teams in the 2025–26 Russian Premier League Locations of teams in the 2025–26 Russian Premier League in Moscow		Pari Nizhny Novgorod
Fisht	Locations of teams in the 2025–26 Russian Premier League Locations of teams in the 2025–26 Russian Premier League in Moscow		Sovcombank Arena
Capacity: 45,994	Locations of teams in the 2025–26 Russian Premier League Locations of teams in the 2025–26 Russian Premier League in Moscow		Capacity: 42,532
Baltika		Dynamo Moscow	Orenburg
Rostec Arena		VTB Arena	Gazovik
Capacity: 33,399		Capacity: 25,716	Capacity: 10,046

=== Personnel and kits ===
Team	Location	Head coach	Captain	Kit manufacturer	Shirt sponsor(s)
Akhmat	Grozny	(Russia) Stanislav Cherchesov	(Russia) Rizvan Utsiyev	(Spain) Joma	Akhmat Foundation
Akron	Tolyatti	(Russia) Murat Iskakov (caretaker)	(Russia) Artem Dzyuba	(Russia) Jögel	Fonbet
Baltika	Kaliningrad	(Russia) Andrey Talalayev	(Colombia) Kevin Andrade	(Germany) Jako	Rostec
CSKA	Moscow	(Russia) Dmitry Igdisamov (caretaker)	(Russia) Igor Akinfeev	(Russia) PRIMERA	Apotheka
Dynamo Makhachkala	Makhachkala	(Russia) Vadim Yevseyev	(Russia) Mutalip Alibekov	Dynamo Makhachkala (self-branded)	Magnit/Betcity
Dynamo Moscow	Moscow	(Russia) Rolan Gusev	(Russia) Daniil Fomin	(Russia) Bosco	BetBoom
Krasnodar	Krasnodar	(Russia) Murad Musayev	(Armenia) Eduard Spertsyan	Krasnodar (self-branded)	Winline
Krylia Sovetov	Samara	(Russia) Sergei Bulatov	(Russia) Sergei Pesyakov	(Spain) Kelme	Fonbet
Lokomotiv	Moscow	(Russia) Mikhail Galaktionov	(Russia) Anton Mitryushkin	Lokomotiv (self-branded)	RZD
Orenburg	Orenburg	(Russia) Ildar Akhmetzyanov	(Morocco) Fahd Moufi	(Russia) PRIMERA	EcoGas
Pari	Nizhny Novgorod	(Russia) Vadim Garanin	(Mali) Mamadou Maiga	(Germany) Jako	Pari
Rostov	Rostov-on-Don	(Spain) Jonatan Alba	(Russia) Konstantin Kuchayev	(Germany) Puma	Fonbet/TNS Energo Rostov-on-Don
Rubin	Kazan	(Spain) Franc Artiga	(Montenegro) Igor Vujačić	Rubin (self-branded)	Kazanorgsintez
Sochi	Sochi	(Russia) Igor Osinkin	(Russia) Kirill Zaika	(Russia) Casa Sportiva	Betcity
Spartak	Moscow	(Spain) Juan Carlos Carcedo	(Russia) Roman Zobnin	(Russia) Jögel	Lukoil
Zenit	Saint Petersburg	(Russia) Sergei Semak	(Brazil) Douglas Santos	(Russia) Jögel	Gazprom

=== Managerial changes ===
Team	Outgoing manager	Manner of departure	Date of vacancy	Position in table	Replaced by	Date of appointment
Krylia Sovetov Samara	(Russia) Igor Osinkin	Mutual consent	27 May 2025	Pre-season	(Russia) Magomed Adiyev	5 June 2025
CSKA Moscow	(Serbia) Marko Nikolić	Resigned	9 June 2025	Pre-season	(Switzerland) Fabio Celestini	20 June 2025
Pari Nizhny Novgorod	(Belarus) Viktor Goncharenko	Sacked	11 June 2025	Pre-season	(Belarus) Aleksey Shpilevsky	16 June 2025
Dynamo Moscow	(Russia) Rolan Gusev (caretaker)	End of caretaking spell	13 June 2025	Pre-season	(Russia) Valery Karpin	13 June 2025
Akhmat Grozny	(Russia) Fyodor Shcherbachenko (caretaker)	End of caretaking spell	16 June 2025	Pre-season	(Russia) Aleksandr Storozhuk	16 June 2025
Akhmat Grozny	(Russia) Aleksandr Storozhuk	Mutual consent	5 August 2025	13th	(Russia) Stanislav Cherchesov	6 August 2025
Sochi	(Spain) Robert Moreno	Mutual consent	2 September 2025	16th	(Russia) Igor Osinkin	4 September 2025
Orenburg	(Bosnia and Herzegovina) Vladimir Slišković	Sacked	5 October 2025	14th	(Russia) Ildar Akhmetzyanov	10 October 2025
Spartak Moscow	(Serbia) Dejan Stanković	Mutual consent	11 November 2025	6th	(Russia) Vadim Romanov (caretaker)	11 November 2025
Dynamo Moscow	(Russia) Valery Karpin	Resigned	17 November 2025	10th	(Russia) Rolan Gusev	17 November 2025 (caretaker); 23 December 2025 (permanent)
Dynamo Makhachkala	(Russia) Khasanbi Bidzhiyev	Resigned	7 December 2025	14th	(Russia) Vadim Yevseyev	29 December 2025
Spartak Moscow	(Russia) Vadim Romanov (caretaker)	End of caretaking spell	5 January 2026	6th	(Spain) Juan Carlos Carcedo	5 January 2026
Rubin Kazan	(Tajikistan) Rashid Rakhimov	Sacked	13 January 2026	7th	(Spain) Franc Artiga	14 January 2026
Krylia Sovetov Samara	(Russia) Magomed Adiyev	Mutual consent	1 April 2026	13th	(Russia) Sergei Bulatov	1 April 2026 (caretaker); 28 April 2026 (permanent)
Pari Nizhny Novgorod	(Belarus) Aleksey Shpilevsky	Mutual consent	27 April 2026	15th	(Russia) Vadim Garanin	29 April 2026
CSKA Moscow	(Switzerland) Fabio Celestini	Mutual consent	4 May 2026	6th	(Russia) Dmitry Igdisamov (caretaker)	4 May 2026
Akron Tolyatti	(Russia) Zaur Tedeyev	Sacked	17 May 2026	13th	(Russia) Murat Iskakov (caretaker)	18 May 2026

== Tournament format and regulations ==
The 16 teams play a round-robin tournament whereby each team plays each one of the other teams twice, once at home and once away, for a total of 240 matches with each team playing 30.

The season started on 18 July. The last games before the winter break will be played on 8 December; the spring part of the season will begin on 27 February and the last games will be played on 17 May.

=== Promotion and relegation ===
For the purpose of determining First League positions for the following considerations, the teams that do not pass 2026–27 RPL licensing or drop out of 2026–27 season for any other reason, or the teams that finished lower than 6th place in First League standings will not be considered. For example, if the teams that finished 1st, 3rd and 4th in the First League standings fail licensing, the team that finished 2nd will be considered the 1st-placed team, the team that finished 5th will be considered the 2nd-placed team, and the team that finished 6th will be considered the 3rd-placed team. There would be no designated 4th-placed team in this scenario.

The teams that finish 15th and 16th will be relegated to the 2026–27 First League, while the top two in that league will be promoted to the Premier League for the 2026–27 season.

The 13th and 14th Premier League teams will play the 4th and 3rd 2025–26 First League teams respectively in two (home-and-away) playoff games, with penalty shootout in effect if necessary. The winners will secure Premier League spots for the 2026–27 season. If only one First League team is eligible for the play-offs (as in the example scenario above), that team will play the 14th-placed RPL team in playoffs, with the winners securing the Premier League spot, and the 13th RPL team will remain in the league. If none of the First League teams are eligible for the play-offs, they will not be held and 13th and 14th-placed RPL teams will remain in the league. If any of the teams are unable to participate in the season after the play-offs have been concluded, or there are not enough teams that pass licensing to follow the above procedures, the replacement will be chosen by the Russian Football Union in consultation with RPL and FNL.

=== Exclusion from the league ===
Any team can be excluded from the Premier League during the season for the following reasons: a) using counterfeit documents or providing inaccurate information to the league; b) not arriving to the game on more than one occasion; c) match fixing. Such a team is automatically relegated and is not replaced during the season, and only one additional team (that gains the least amount of points at the end of the season) is directly relegated. If the excluded team had played fewer than 15 games at the time of exclusion, all its results would be annulled and would not count for the standings. If the excluded team had played at least 15 games at the time of exclusion, all their remaining opponents would be awarded a victory without effect on their goal difference, the same would retroactively apply to the results of the second-half-of-the-season games such a team would have already played at the time of their exclusion, the results of the first 15 games of this team would remain in place and count for standings.

== Season events ==
=== Last match day ===
For the third consecutive season, the champion was determined on the last matchday. It was held on 17 May 2026, with all the games played simultaneously with common kick-off time of 18:00 Moscow Time. Zenit St. Petersburg entered the day with 65 points, and the reigning champions Krasnodar (who led for most of the season, but fell into second place after losing to Dynamo Moscow on matchday 29) entered the day with 63 points. Zenit played away at Rostov and Krasnodar hosted Orenburg, both Rostov and Orenburg were secure from relegation. The first tie-breaker if teams are tied on points is head-to-head record, Zenit has 4 head-to-head points in games against Krasnodar and Krasnodar has 1. Therefore Zenit would have won the title if they did not lose to Rostov, or if they lost to Rostov and Krasnodar did not defeat Orenburg. Krasnodar would have won the title if they defeated Orenburg and Zenit lost to Rostov. Zenit defeated Rostov 1–0 and won their 11th title.

== League table ==
Pos	Team	Pld	W	D	L	GF	GA	GD	Pts	Qualification or relegation
1	Zenit Saint Petersburg (C)	30	20	8	2	53	19	+34	68	
2	Krasnodar	30	20	6	4	60	23	+37	66	
3	Lokomotiv Moscow	30	14	11	5	54	39	+15	53	
4	Spartak Moscow	30	15	7	8	47	39	+8	52	
5	CSKA Moscow	30	15	6	9	44	33	+11	51	
6	Baltika Kaliningrad	30	11	13	6	38	21	+17	46	
7	Dynamo Moscow	30	12	9	9	51	40	+11	45	
8	Rubin Kazan	30	11	10	9	29	30	−1	43	
9	Akhmat Grozny	30	9	10	11	35	39	−4	37	
10	Rostov	30	8	9	13	25	32	−7	33	
11	Krylia Sovetov Samara	30	8	8	14	35	50	−15	32	
12	Orenburg	30	7	8	15	29	44	−15	29	
13	Akron Tolyatti (O)	30	6	9	15	35	53	−18	27	Qualification to relegation play-offs
14	Dynamo Makhachkala (O)	30	5	11	14	19	37	−18	26	Qualification to relegation play-offs
15	Pari Nizhny Novgorod (R)	30	6	5	19	26	50	−24	23	Relegation to First League
16	Sochi (R)	30	6	4	20	29	60	−31	22	Relegation to First League

Source: Premier Liga
Rules for classification: 1) Points; 2) Head-to-head points; 3) Head-to-head matches won; 4) Head-to-head goal difference; 5) Head-to-head goals scored; 6) Matches won; 7) Goal difference; 8) Goals scored; 9) Away matches won; 10) Away goals scored; 11) Disciplinary points (3 for red card, 1 for caution), in ascending order; 9) 2024–25 position (not applicable to final standings); 10) Play-off. Note: if teams tied on points did not play an equal number of head-to-head matches, head-to-head criteria are not considered for the standings.
(C) Champions; (O) Play-off winners; (R) Relegated

== Relegation play-offs ==
The draw to determine the hosts in each leg was held on 8 May 2026.

=== First leg ===
20 May 2026
17:30

Ural Yekaterinburg	0–1	Dynamo Makhachkala
	Report	Miro 5'

Yekaterinburg Arena, Yekaterinburg
Attendance: 19,474
Referee: Anton Frolov

20 May 2026
19:30

Rotor Volgograd	0–2	Akron Tolyatti
	Report	Benchimol 45+1', 51'

Volgograd Arena, Volgograd
Attendance: 34,098
Referee: Igor Kaplenkov

=== Second leg ===
23 May 2026
16:00

Dynamo Makhachkala	2–0	Ural Yekaterinburg
Agalarov 39' (pen.); Mrezigue 62'	Report

Anzhi Arena, Kaspiysk
Attendance: 11,124
Referee: Nikita Novikov

Dynamo won 3–0 on aggregate and remained in the Russian Premier League, Ural remained in the Russian First League.

23 May 2026
18:30

Akron Tolyatti	0–1	Rotor Volgograd
	Report	Shilnikov 49'

Solidarnost Samara Arena, Samara
Attendance: 9,077
Referee: Andrey Prokopov

Akron won 2–1 on aggregate and remained in the Russian Premier League, Rotor remained in the Russian First League.

== Results ==
Home \ Away	AKH	AKR	BAL	CSK	DMA	DMO	KRA	KRY	LOK	ORE	PNN	ROS	RUB	SOC	SPA	ZEN
Akhmat Grozny	—	3–0	1–1	1–0	1–1	2–1	0–1	3–1	1–1	1–0	2–0	1–0	0–2	2–4	1–2	1–0
Akron Tolyatti	1–1	—	0–2	1–2	1–1	2–3	0–1	1–1	1–1	1–2	1–2	1–3	2–2	3–2	1–1	1–1
Baltika Kaliningrad	2–0	0–1	—	1–0	2–0	1–2	1–1	2–0	1–1	3–2	2–2	0–0	0–1	4–0	1–0	0–0
CSKA Moscow	2–1	3–1	1–0	—	3–1	1–4	1–1	1–0	3–1	2–0	2–0	1–1	5–1	0–1	3–2	1–3
Dynamo Makhachkala	1–0	1–1	2–2	0–1	—	1–0	0–2	2–0	1–1	1–0	0–1	1–2	2–1	0–0	0–0	0–1
Dynamo Moscow	2–2	1–2	1–1	1–3	3–0	—	2–1	4–0	3–5	3–3	3–0	1–0	0–1	2–0	2–2	1–3
Krasnodar	2–0	2–1	2–2	3–2	2–1	1–0	—	5–0	1–2	3–0	5–0	2–1	1–0	5–1	2–1	0–2
Krylia Sovetov Samara	2–2	4–1	1–1	1–1	2–0	2–3	0–6	—	2–0	1–1	2–0	2–0	0–0	2–0	2–1	1–1
Lokomotiv Moscow	2–2	5–1	1–0	3–0	1–1	1–1	1–1	2–2	—	1–0	2–1	3–3	1–0	3–0	4–2	0–0
Orenburg	2–2	2–0	0–0	0–0	1–1	1–3	0–1	1–0	0–1	—	2–1	0–1	2–2	3–1	0–2	2–1
Pari Nizhny Novgorod	1–2	0–1	0–0	1–2	2–0	1–1	0–3	3–0	2–3	3–1	—	0–1	0–0	2–1	1–2	0–2
Rostov	1–1	0–1	1–1	1–0	1–1	0–1	0–0	1–4	1–3	0–1	1–0	—	2–0	0–1	1–1	0–1
Rubin Kazan	1–0	1–1	0–3	0–0	1–0	0–0	2–1	2–0	3–0	0–0	2–2	1–0	—	2–1	0–2	2–2
Sochi	1–1	0–4	0–2	1–3	0–0	1–1	1–2	2–1	2–4	3–1	2–1	0–1	0–1	—	2–3	0–3
Spartak Moscow	3–1	4–3	0–3	1–0	1–0	1–1	1–2	2–1	2–1	1–0	3–0	1–1	2–1	2–1	—	2–2
Zenit Saint Petersburg	2–0	2–0	1–0	1–1	4–0	2–1	1–1	2–1	2–0	5–2	2–0	2–1	1–0	2–1	2–0	—

Source: Russian Premier League
Legend: Blue = home team win; Yellow = draw; Red = away team win.

== Season statistics ==
=== Top goalscorers ===
Rank	Player	Club	Goals
1	(Colombia) Jhon Córdoba	Krasnodar	17
2	(El Salvador) Brayan Gil	Baltika	13
2	(Armenia) Eduard Spertsyan	Krasnodar	13
2	(Russia) Aleksey Batrakov	Lokomotiv	13
5	(Russia) Konstantin Tyukavin	Dynamo Moscow	10
5	(Russia) Aleksandr Sobolev	Zenit	10
5	(Russia) Dmitry Vorobyov	Lokomotiv	10
5	(Albania) Mirlind Daku	Rubin	10
9	(Russia) Ivan Sergeyev	Dynamo Moscow	9
9	(Russia) Maksim Glushenkov	Zenit	9
9	(Angola) Egas Cacintura	Akhmat	9

=== Hat-tricks ===
Player	For	Against	Result	Date	Ref
(Russia) Aleksey Batrakov	Lokomotiv	Spartak	4–2 (H)	9 August 2025	
(Russia) Maksim Glushenkov^{4}	Zenit	Orenburg	5–2 (H)	27 September 2025	
(Colombia) Jhon Córdoba^{4}	Krasnodar	Pari NN	5–0 (H)	21 March 2026	
(Russia) Kirill Kravtsov	Sochi	Orenburg	3–1 (H)	3 May 2026	

- ^{4} Player scored 4 goals

=== Clean sheets ===
Rank	Player	Club	Clean sheets
1	(Russia) Denis Adamov	Zenit	15
2	(Russia) Maksim Borisko	Baltika	14
2	(Russia) Yevgeni Staver	Rubin	14
4	(Russia) Stanislav Agkatsev	Krasnodar	13
5	(Tajikistan) Rustam Yatimov	Rostov	8
6	(Russia) Aleksandr Maksimenko	Spartak	7
6	(Russia) Anton Mitryushkin	Lokomotiv	7
8	(Russia) Sergei Pesyakov	Krylia Sovetov	6
9	(Russia) Nikita Medvedev	Pari NN	5
9	(Russia) Bogdan Ovsyannikov	Orenburg	5

== Awards ==
=== Monthly awards ===
Month	Player of the Month		Manager of the Month		Goal of the Month		Ref.
Month	Player	Club	Manager	Club	Player	Club	Ref.
July/August	(Russia) Aleksey Batrakov	Lokomotiv	(Switzerland) Fabio Celestini	CSKA	(Russia) Vladislav Saus	Baltika	
September	(Russia) Maksim Glushenkov	Zenit	(Switzerland) Fabio Celestini	CSKA	(Russia) Maksim Glushenkov	Zenit	
October	(Russia) Dmitry Vorobyov	Lokomotiv	(Russia) Murad Musayev	Krasnodar	(Russia) Dmitry Vorobyov	Lokomotiv	
November/December	(Armenia) Eduard Spertsyan	Krasnodar	(Russia) Murad Musayev	Krasnodar	(Russia) Dmitri Barinov	Lokomotiv	
March	(Argentina) Esequiel Barco	Spartak	(Russia) Rolan Gusev	Dynamo Moscow	(Russia) Ruslan Litvinov	Spartak	
April	(Russia) Konstantin Tyukavin	Dynamo Moscow	(Russia) Sergei Semak	Zenit	(Portugal) Gedson Fernandes	Spartak	

==== Annual awards ====
Annual awards
Award	Player	Club
Player of the Season	(Colombia) Jhon Córdoba	Krasnodar
Forward of the Season	(Colombia) Jhon Córdoba	Krasnodar
Midfielder of the Season	(Armenia) Eduard Spertsyan	Krasnodar
Defender of the Season	(Russia) Igor Diveev	Zenit Saint Petersburg
Goalkeeper of the Season	(Russia) Stanislav Agkatsev	Krasnodar
Goal of the Season	(Russia) Dmitri Vorobyov	Lokomotiv Moscow
Assist of the Season	(Russia) Danil Krugovoy	CSKA Moscow
Coach of the Season	(Russia) Sergei Semak	Zenit Saint Petersburg
Young Player of the Season	(Russia) Aleksei Batrakov	Lokomotiv Moscow

Team of the Year
Goalkeeper	(Russia) Stanislav Agkatsev (Krasnodar)			
Defenders	(Russia) Ilya Vakhania (Rostov)	(Russia) Igor Diveev (Zenit Saint Petersburg)	(Brazil) Nino (Zenit Saint Petersburg)	(Brazil) Moisés (CSKA Moscow)
Midfielders	(Russia) Aleksei Batrakov (Lokomotiv Moscow)		(Brazil) Wendel (Zenit Saint Petersburg)	(Armenia) Eduard Spertsyan (Krasnodar)
Forwards	(Brazil) Luís Henrique (Zenit Saint Petersburg)		(Colombia) Jhon Córdoba (Krasnodar)	(Argentina) Ezequiel Barco (Spartak Moscow)

== Attendances ==
Russian Premier League clubs listed by average home league attendance:

Pos	Club	Average attendance
1	Zenit	37,896
2	FC Krasnodar	29,398
3	Spartak Moscow	23,720
4	Baltika	17,139
5	CSKA	15,457
6	Dynamo Moscow	15,264
7	Rubin Kazan	14,182
8	FC Rostov	12,422
9	Lokomotiv Moscow	12,214
10	Krylia Sovetov	10,288
11	Nizhny Novgorod	5,767
12	Dynamo Makhachkala	5,158
13	FC Orenburg	5,075
14	PFC Sochi	4,812
15	Akron	4,702
16	Akhmat	4,414
