= Skorodumov =

Skorodumov (Russian: Скородумов), feminine: Skorodumova is a Russian surname. Boris Unbegaun writes that it originates in the tradition of the surnames of Russian Orthodox clergy. This one was given to smart students of theological schools, literally meaning "quick-witted": "skoro-" ('quick') + "-dum-" ('think')+ "-ov" (typical surname suffix). Notable people with the surname include:

- Gavriil Skorodumov (1754–1792), Russian engraver, draftsman, and painter
- Mikhail Skorodumov, (1892–1963), Russian general
- Ivan (Ioasaf) Skorodumov (1888–1955), bishop of the Russian Orthodox Church Outside of Russia
- Valeri Skorodumov
