= Maya Petrova =

Russian handball player (born 1982)

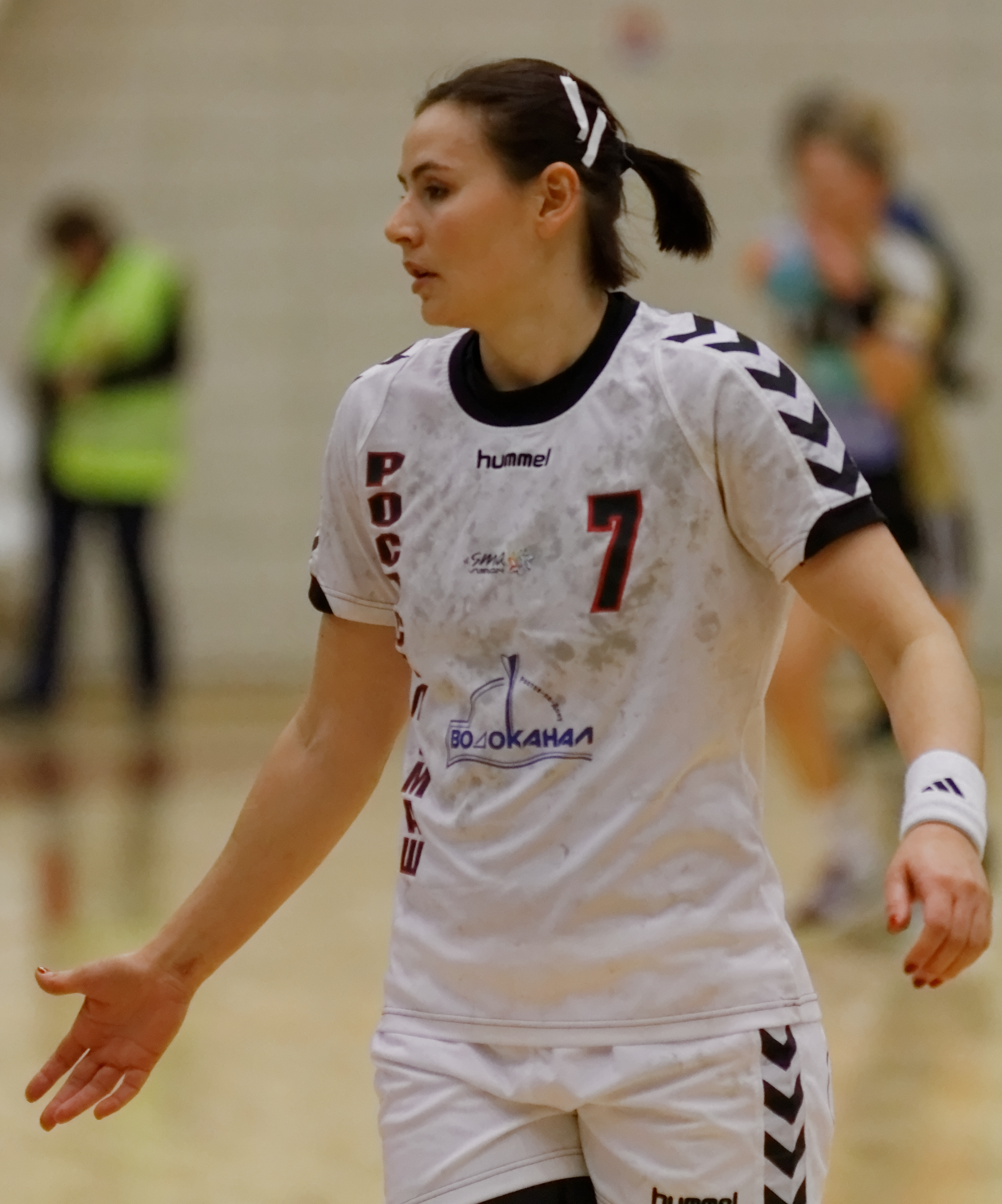

Personal information
- Full name: Maya Andreyevna Petrova
- Nationality: Russian
- Born: 26 May 1982 (age 44) Volgograd, Russian SFSR, Soviet Union
- Height: 1.77 m (5 ft 10 in)

Sport
- Sport: Handball
- Position: Pivot

Senior clubs
- Years: Team
- 1999-2003: Dinamo Volgograd
- 2003-2020: Rostov-Don
National team
Years	Team	Apps	(Gls)
2008–2019	Russia	85	(90)
–	Russia Beach		

Teams managed
- 2023: Rostov-Don (assistant)
- 2023-: Rostov-Don (youth)
Medal record
Olympic Games
Gold medal – first place	2016 Rio de Janeiro	Team
World Championship
Gold medal – first place	2009 Beijing
European Championship
Silver medal – second place	2018 France
Bronze medal – third place	2008 Macedonia
Beach handball
World Championship
Gold medal – first place	2004 El Gouna
Bronze medal – third place	2006 Rio de Janeiro
European Championship
Gold medal – first place	2004 Alania
Silver medal – second place	2006 Cuxhaven

Maya Andreyevna Petrova (Russian: Майя Андреевна Петрова; née Kaverina; born 26 May 1982) is a former Russian handball player and current coach for Rostov-Don and the Russian national team.

At the 2009 World Women's Handball Championship she reached the final and won the gold medal with the Russian team.

In addition to regular handball, Petrova also played Beach handball.

== Career ==
Petrova started playing handball at 11. At the age of 17 she joined the Russian top league team Aqva Volgograd. Here she won the 2001 Russian championship. In 2003 she joined Rostov-Don, where she played the rest of her career. During her 17 years at the club she won the Russian Cup 4 times, in 2007, 2008, 2012 and 2015, and the Russian Championship 5 times; in 2015, 2017, 2018, 2019 and 2020. She also won the 2017 EHF European League.

In May 2020 Petrova announced her retirement.

=== National team ===
At the 2009 World Championship she won gold medals with the Russian team. At the 2008 European Championship she won bronze medals.

At the 2016 Olympics in Rio she won gold medals.

At the 2018 European Championship she won silver medals with the Russian team.

== Coaching career ==
Until February 2023 she became the assistant coach at her former club Rostov-Don. From the 2022-23 season she instead became a coach on the Rostov youth team.

== Personal life ==
Her son Artyom Petrov is a professional football player.
