= Artyom Petrov (footballer) =

Russian footballer (born 2008)

Personal information
- Full name: Artyom Aleksandrovich Petrov
- Date of birth: 24 February 2008 (age 18)
- Place of birth: Moscow, Russia
- Height: 1.84 m (6 ft 0 in)
- Position: Goalkeeper

Team information
- Current team: Rostov; Rostov-2
- Number: 84

Youth career
- Rostov

Senior career*
Years	Team	Apps	(Gls)
2025–	Rostov-2	9	(0)
2026–	Rostov	10	(0)

International career^{‡}
2024–2025	Russia U17	3	(0)
- * Club domestic league appearances and goals as of 20 November 2026 ‡ National team caps and goals as of 17 February 2025

Artyom Aleksandrovich Petrov (Russian: Артём Александрович Петров; born 24 February 2008) is a Russian football player who plays as a goalkeeper for Rostov and Rostov-2.

== Career ==
Petrov was raised in the youth system of Rostov and made his senior debut for their reserve team in 2005 in the fourth-tier Russian Second League Division B.

In the summer of 2026, he signed a new contract extension with Rostov.

Petrov made his debut for Rostov's senior squad on 4 August 2026 in a Russian Cup game against Akron Tolyatti. He made his Russian Premier League debut on 29 August 2026 against Krasnodar.

== Personal life ==
His mother Maya Petrova is an Olympic champion in handball.

== Career statistics ==
As of 20 November 2026

Club	Season	League			Cup		Total	
Club	Season	Division	Apps	Goals	Apps	Goals	Apps	Goals
Rostov-2	2025	Russian Second League B	1	0	—		1	0
Rostov-2	2026	Russian Second League B	8	0	—		8	0
Rostov-2	Total		9	0	0	0	9	0
Rostov	2026–27	Russian Premier League	10	0	2	0	12	0
Career total			19	0	2	0	21	0
