= Igor Osinkin =

Russian footballer

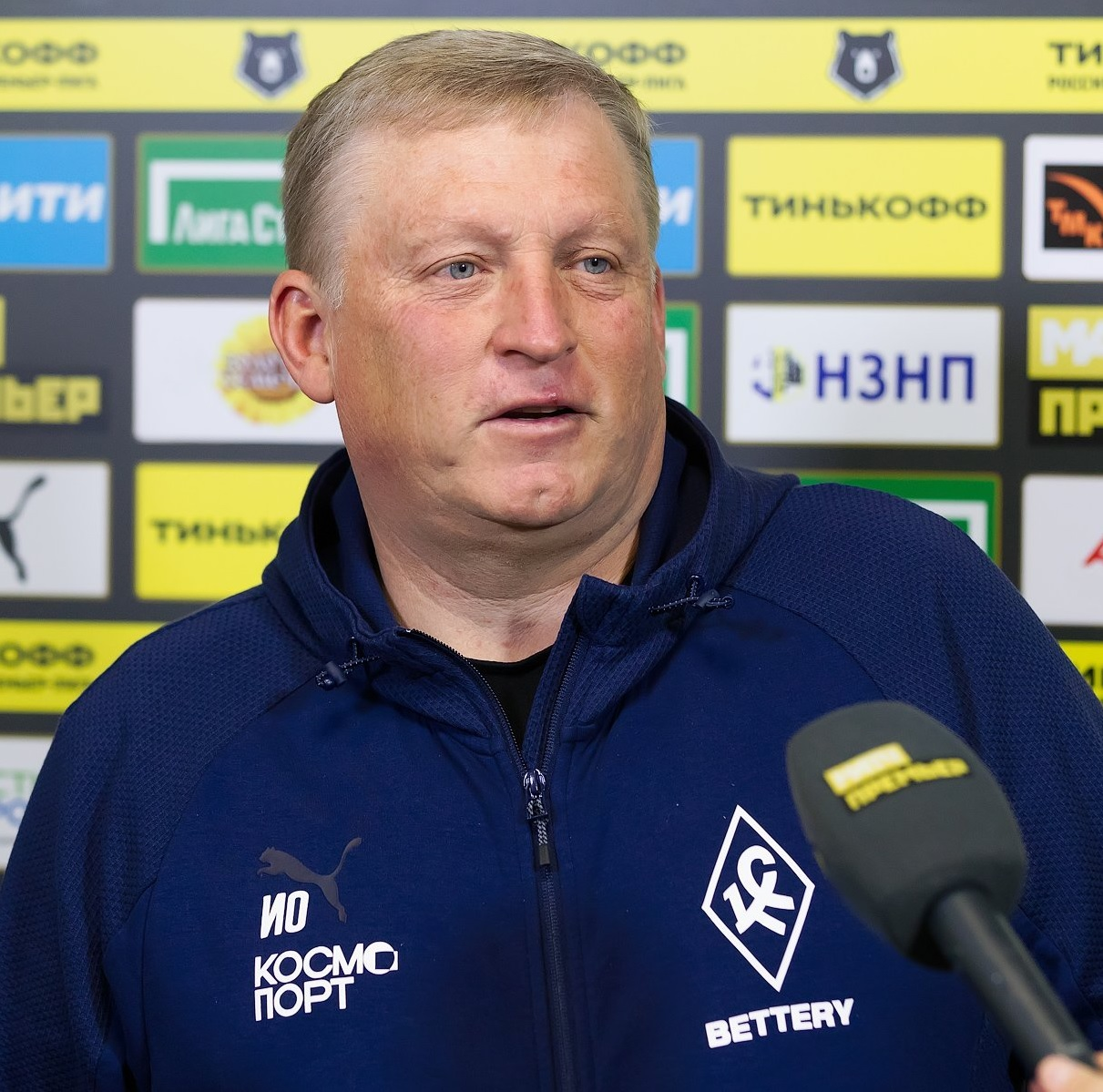
- Osinkin coaching Krylia Sovetov in 2022

Personal information
- Full name: Igor Vitalyevich Osinkin
- Date of birth: 4 June 1965 (age 61)
- Place of birth: Penza, Russian SFSR, Soviet Union
- Positions: Forward; midfielder

Team information
- Current team: Sochi (manager)

Youth career
- FC Spartak Ordzhonikidze

Senior career*
Years	Team	Apps	(Gls)
1982	FC Spartak Ordzhonikidze	0	(0)
1983	Amudarya Nukus	17	(1)
1984–1985	FC Spartak Ordzhonikidze	0	(0)
1987	FC Lokomotiv Mineralnye Vody	5	(0)
1988	FC Dynamo Makhachkala	20	(2)
1989–1990	FC Avtodor Vladikavkaz		
1991–1992	FC Iriston Vladikavkaz (amateur)		
1992	FC Stroitel Vladikavkaz		

Managerial career
- 1990–1996: Yunost Vladikavkaz (academy) (assistant)
- 1996–2005: Yunost Vladikavkaz (academy)
- 2003–2004: FC Avtodor Vladikavkaz (assistant)
- 2005–2006: Krylia Sovetov Tolyatti (academy)
- 2006–2007: FC Krylia Sovetov-SOK
- 2008–2009: FC Togliatti
- 2010–2013: FC Akademiya Tolyatti
- 2013: FC Kuban Krasnodar (caretaker)
- 2013–2016: FC Kuban Krasnodar (reserves)
- 2016: FC Kuban Krasnodar
- 2016–2020: FC Chertanovo Moscow
- 2020–2025: PFC Krylia Sovetov Samara
- 2025–: PFC Sochi
- * Club domestic league appearances and goals

Igor Vitalyevich Osinkin (Russian: Игорь Витальевич Осинькин; born 4 June 1965) is a Russian professional football coach and a former player who is the manager of Russian Premier League club Sochi.

== Coaching career ==
As a youth coach, he coached Alan Kusov and Alan Dzagoev, who grew up to play for the Russia national football team.

On 28 July 2020, he joined PFC Krylia Sovetov Samara. He led the team to promotion to the Russian Premier League and also to the final of the 2020–21 Russian Cup in his first season at the helm. On 23 June 2021, he extended his contract with Krylia Sovetov for three more seasons. Osinkin left Krylia Sovetov at the end of the 2024–25 season.

On 4 September 2025, Osinkin signed with Sochi until the end of the 2025–26 season. Sochi was relegated from the Russian Premier League at the end of the season.

=== Coaching Statistics ===
As of 27 May 2025

Team	From	To	Record				
Team	From	To	P	W	D	L	Win %
Krylia Sovetov-SOK	26 June 2006	31 December 2007	43	16	3	24	37.21
Togliatti	1 January 2008	31 December 2009	67	25	15	27	37.31
Akademiya	1 January 2010	30 June 2013	76	36	17	23	47.37
Kuban	1 July 2013	29 June 2013	3	1	2	0	33.33
Kuban	3 May 2016	13 June 2016	6	3	0	3	50.00
Chertanovo	28 June 2016	27 July 2020	141	71	35	35	50.35
Krylya Sovetov	28 July 2020	27 May 2025	194	85	35	74	43.81
Total			530	237	107	186	44.72
