= FC SKA Rostov-on-Don =

Russian association football club

SKA Rostov
- Full name: Football Club; Sports Club of the Army; Rostov-on-Don
- Nickname: Armeytsy (Military men)
- Founded: 1937; 89 years ago
- Ground: SKA SKVO Stadium, Rostov-on-Don
- Capacity: 27,300
- Owner: Vasiliy Vakulenko
- Chairman: Boris Guziev
- Manager: Andrei Karyaka
- League: Media Football League; Rostov Region Championship
- 2025: Rostov Region Championship, Group 2, 12th
- Website: www.fcskarostov.ru
Home colours	Away colours

FC SKA Rostov-on-Don (Russian: ФК СКА Ростов-на-Дону) is a Russian association football club based in Rostov-on-Don. The club's history includes becoming runners-up of the Soviet Top League in 1966 and winning the Soviet Cup in 1981.

== History ==
"SKA"

In final 1981.

\The club was founded on 27 August 1937 and was known as RODKA (1937–1953), ODO (1954–1956) and SKVO (1957–1959 and 2013–2015). The team was given its most familiar name back in March 2015.

SKVO entered the Class B of the Soviet league in 1958. Prior to that, the team only played in regional tournaments. SKVO became the champions of Class B in 1958 and were promoted to Class A. They stayed at the top level of Soviet football until 1973, winning silver medals in 1966 and finishing fourth in 1959, 1960, 1963, and 1964.

In the 1970s and 1980s SKA moved between Top and First leagues several times. After relegation 1973, they played in the First League in 1974, 1976–1978, 1982–1983, and 1986–1989, and in the Top League in 1975, 1979–1981, and 1984–1985. SKA spent two last years of the Soviet football (1990 and 1991) in the Second League.

SKA were also successful in the Soviet Cup. They won the trophy in 1981 and were the losing finalists in 1969 and 1971.

After entering the Russian Second Division, SKA have been playing there with a few exceptions: they played in the Third Division in 1994, in the Amateur Football League in 1998, and in the First Division in 2002. In 2002 SKA finished 17th in the First Division, going straight back down but recording the best result in Russian football. It finished 2nd South Zone of Second Division but returned First Division after relegations of Dynamo Makhachkala, FC Volgar-Gazprom Astrakhan and Lada Togliatti due to their licences were refused. It finished 17th in 2007 and 13th in 2008. Despite finishing outside of relegation zone in 2008, the club could not afford to play in the First Division for 2009 and volunteered to get relegated to the Second Division for 2009. After playing on that level from 2009 to 2013–14 seasons, the club failed professional licensing and began the 2014–15 season in the Russian Amateur Football League. It returned to the third-tier Russian Professional Football League for the 2015–16 season.

In October 2019, the rapper Basta (Vasily Vakulenko) became the owner of FC SKA, who paid all the club's debts and invested 10 million rubles in it. Also, Rostec Group of Companies and Alexander Nazarov participated in the revival of the club.

On 25 January 2024, Basta announced that he would move the club to the Media Football League as the club cannot afford to participate in the Russian Second League at that time.

== Awards ==
- Soviet Top League
  - Runners-up (1): 1966
- Soviet Cup
  - Winners (1): 1981
  - Runners-up (2): 1969, 1971
- Soviet First League
  - Winners (1): 1958
  - Runners-up (3): 1974, 1978, 1983

== European record ==
Cup Winners' Cup

Season	Round	Country	Club	Home	Away	Aggregate
1981–82	First Round	(Turkey)	Ankaragücü	3–0	2–0	5–0
1981–82	Second Round	(Germany)	Eintracht Frankfurt	1–0	0–2	1–2
