= Russia national football team =

Men's association football team

Russia
- Nickname(s): Сборная / Sbornaya (The National Team); Наши парни / Nashi parni (Our Boys)
- Association: Rossiyskiy Futbolnyy Soyuz (RFS); Российский Футбольный Союз
- Confederation: UEFA (Europe)
- Head coach: Valery Karpin
- Captain: Aleksandr Golovin
- Most caps: Sergei Ignashevich (127)
- Top scorer: Artem Dzyuba (31) (Note: Oleg Blokhin, who scored 42 goals for the Soviet Union, is recognised by FIFA as Russia's top scorer, as the statistics of the Soviet Union were inherited by its successor state Russia.)
- Home stadium: Various
- FIFA code: RUS
First colours	Second colours

FIFA ranking
- Current: 35 (18 November 2026)
- Highest: 3 (April 1996)
- Lowest: 70 (June 2018)

First international
- As Russian Empire: Unofficial; Russia 5–4 Bohemia (Saint Petersburg, Russia; 16 October 1910); Official; Finland 2–1 Russia (Stockholm, Sweden; 30 June 1912) As Soviet Union: Soviet Union 3–0 Turkey (Moscow, Soviet Union; 16 November 1924) As Russia: Russia 2–0 Mexico (Moscow, Russia; 16 August 1992)

Biggest win
- As Russian Empire: Russia 5–4 Bohemia (Saint Petersburg, Russia; 16 October 1910); Russia 1–0 Bohemia (Moscow, Russia; 23 October 1910) As Soviet Union: Soviet Union 11–1 India (Moscow, Soviet Union; 16 September 1955); Finland 0–10 Soviet Union (Helsinki, Finland; 15 August 1957) As Russia: Russia 11–0 Brunei (Krasnodar, Russia; 15 November 2024)

Biggest defeat
- As Russian Empire: Germany 16–0 Russian Empire (Stockholm, Sweden; 1 July 1912) As Soviet Union: England 5–0 Soviet Union (London, England; 22 October 1958) As Russia: Portugal 7–1 Russia (Lisbon, Portugal; 13 October 2004)

World Cup
- Appearances: 7 as Soviet Union (first in 1958); 4 as Russia (first in 1994)
- Best result: Fourth place (1966 - as Soviet Union); Quarter-finals (2018 - as Russia)

European Championship
- Appearances: 5 as Soviet Union (first in 1960); 1 as CIS (first in 1992); 6 as Russia (first in 1996)
- Best result: Champions (1960 - as Soviet Union); Group stage (1992 - as CIS); Semi-finals (2008 - as Russia)

Confederations Cup
- Appearances: 1 (first in 2017)
- Best result: Group stage (2017)

The Russia national football team (Russian: Сборная России по футболу, romanized: Sbornaya Rossii po futbolu) represents Russia in men's international football. It is controlled by the Russian Football Union (Russian: Российский футбольный союз, Rossiyskiy Futbolnyy Soyuz), the governing body for football in Russia. Russia's home ground is the Luzhniki Stadium in Moscow and their head coach is Valery Karpin.

As the Russian Empire before 1917, as the Russian SFSR in 1917–1924 and as the Soviet Union in 1924–1991, Russia first entered the FIFA World Cup in 1958. They have qualified for the tournament 11 times (seven of which as the Soviet Union), with their best result being their fourth-place finish in 1966. As the Soviet Union, Russia was a founding member of UEFA in 1954, winning the first edition of the European Championship in 1960 and were runners-up in 1964, 1972 and 1988. Since the dissolution of the Soviet Union, Russia's best result was in 2008, when the team finished third. In addition to Ukraine and Uzbekistan, Russia is the only post-Soviet state to qualify for the FIFA World Cup finals.

On 28 February 2022, following the Russian invasion of Ukraine and in accordance with a "recommendation" by the International Olympic Committee (IOC), FIFA and UEFA suspended the participation of Russia in their competitions. The Russian Football Union unsuccessfully appealed the FIFA and UEFA bans to the Court of Arbitration for Sport, which upheld the bans. Since then, they have played several friendlies, mostly against non-Western countries.

== History ==
=== Beginning ===
Led by manager Pavel Sadyrin, Russia were in Group 5 for the qualification campaign for the 1994 FIFA World Cup held in the United States which consisted of Greece, Iceland, Hungary and Luxembourg. The suspension of FR Yugoslavia reduced the group to five teams. Russia qualified alongside Greece with five wins, one draw and one defeat. Russia went to the US as an independent country. The Russian squad consisted of veterans like goalkeeper Stanislav Cherchesov, Aleksandr Borodyuk and players like Viktor Onopko, Oleg Salenko, Dmitri Cheryshev, Aleksandr Mostovoi, Vladimir Beschastnykh, and Valery Karpin (some of these Russian players could have chosen to play for the Ukraine national football team but the Ukrainian Association of Football had not secured recognition in time to compete in the 1994 FIFA World Cup qualification), but was without many players who represented the Commonwealth of Independent States at UEFA Euro 1992 such as Andrei Kanchelskis, Igor Shalimov and Igor Kolyvanov, who declined call-ups during this time due to divergences with Sadyrin's managing style and regarding the prizes per victory promised by the RFU.

In the final tournament, Russia was drawn into Group B with Cameroon, Sweden, and Brazil. Russia was eliminated from the tournament with three points. Sadyrin was sacked following what was a poor performance.

=== Euro 1996 ===
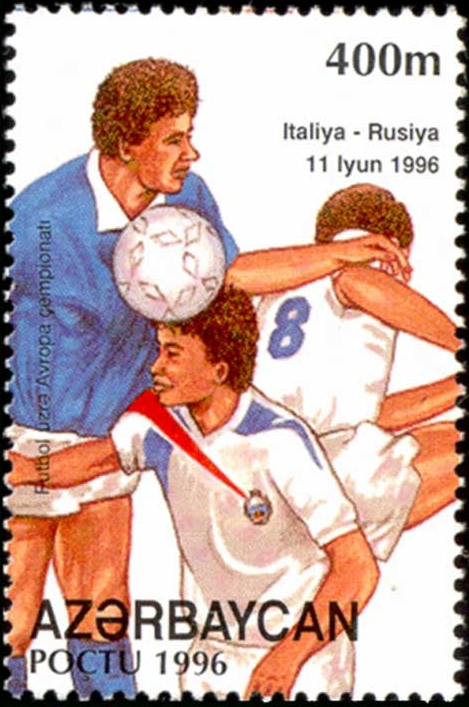
Russia's UEFA Euro 1996 match against Italy on a stamp of Azerbaijan

After Sadyrin was sacked, Oleg Romantsev was appointed coach to lead Russia to UEFA Euro 1996. During qualifying, Russia overcame Scotland, Greece, Finland, San Marino, and the Faroe Islands to finish in first place with eight wins and two draws.

In the final tournament, Russia was in Group C with Germany, the Czech Republic and Italy. They were eliminated after losing 2–1 to Italy and 3–0 to Germany. Russia's last game against the Czech Republic ended 3–3. Germany and Czech Republic went on to meet in the final.

=== 1997–1999 ===
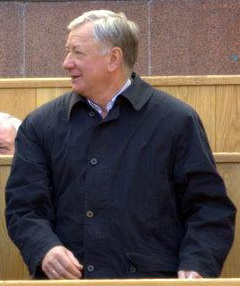
Boris Ignatyev managed Russia in their unsuccessful qualification campaign for the 1998 FIFA World Cup.

After Euro 96, Boris Ignatyev was appointed manager for the campaign to qualify for the 1998 FIFA World Cup in France. In the qualifying stage, Russia was in Group 5 with Bulgaria, Israel, Cyprus, and Luxembourg. Russia and Bulgaria were considered the two main contenders to qualify from the group with Israel considered a minor threat. Russia began the campaign with two victories against Cyprus and Luxembourg and two draws against Israel and Cyprus. They continued with victories against Luxembourg and Israel. Russia suffered their only defeat of the campaign with a 1–0 loss to Bulgaria. They ended the campaign with a 4–2 victory in the return game over Bulgaria and qualify for the play-off spot. In the play-offs, Russia was drawn with Italy. In the first leg Russia drew 1–1. In the away leg, Russia were defeated 1–0 and failed to qualify for the World Cup.

After failing to qualify for the World Cup in France, Russia played to qualify for the UEFA Euro 2000 co-hosted by Belgium and the Netherlands. Anatoliy Byshovets was appointed as Russia manager. Russia were drawn in Group 4 for the qualifying round with France, Ukraine, Iceland, Armenia, and Andorra. Russia and France were considered as favorites for the top two spots with Ukraine being an outside contender. Russia began their campaign with three straight defeats to Ukraine, France, and Iceland. Outraged by this result, the Russian Football Union immediately sacked Byshovets and reappointed Oleg Romantsev as manager. Russia went on to win their next six games including a 3–2 victory over eventual champions France at the Stade de France. In their last game against Ukraine, a win for Russia would have resulted in outright qualification as the winners of the group, having an identical head-to-head record with France (a 3–2 win and a 3–2 loss), while possessing a superior goal difference. The game finished 1–1 after an error by the goalkeeper Aleksandr Filimonov late in the game. Russia finished third in the group, failing to qualify for their second consecutive major tournament.

=== Revival ===
Oleg Romantsev remained as manager of the national team to supervise their qualification campaign to the 2002 FIFA World Cup in South Korea and Japan. In the preliminary stage, Russia was in Group 1 with Slovenia, FR Yugoslavia, and Switzerland, Faroe Islands, and Luxembourg. Russia finished in first place to qualify directly managing seven wins, two draws, and a loss.

Russia was drawn into Group H with Belgium, Tunisia, and Japan. In their first game, Russia achieved a 2–0 victory over Tunisia, but lost their next match to Japan 1–0, causing riots to erupt in Moscow. For their last game against Belgium, Russia needed a draw to take them to the second round, but lost 3–2 and was eliminated.

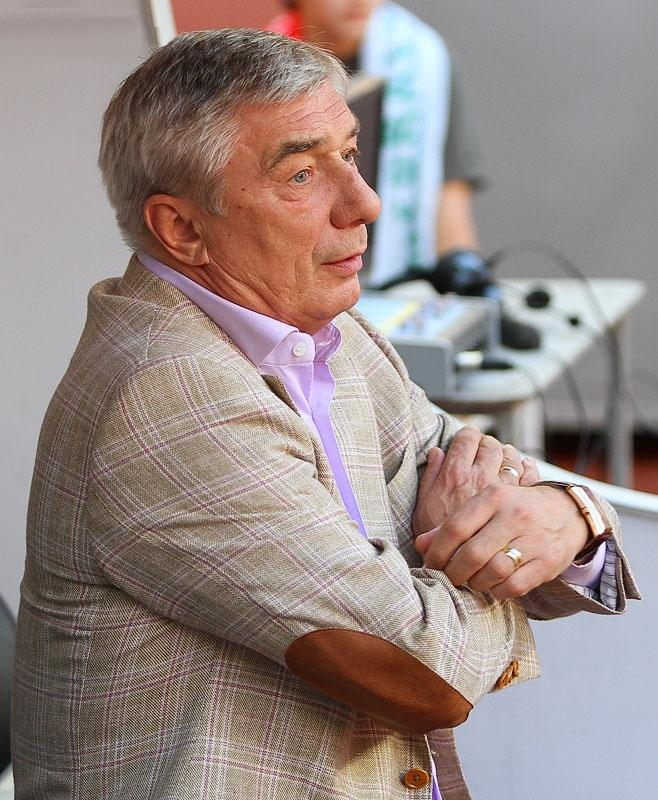
Georgi Yartsev managed Russia at Euro 2004.

Romantsev was sacked immediately following the tournament and replaced with CSKA's Valery Gazzaev. His task looked difficult as Russia's group consisted of Switzerland, Republic of Ireland, Albania, and Georgia with the Irish considered favourites and an improving Swiss side as an increasing threat. Russia began their campaign with home victories against Ireland and Albania, but lost their next two games away to Albania and Georgia. Gazzaev was sacked after a disappointing draw with Switzerland in Basel, and Georgi Yartsev was then appointed manager. He managed to qualify Russia for a play-off against Wales after home victories to Switzerland and Georgia. In the first play-off leg, Russia drew 0–0 with Wales in Moscow, but a Vadim Evseev header gave Russia a 1–0 victory in the away leg in Cardiff to qualify for Euro 2004. The victory was overshadowed when Russian midfielder Yegor Titov tested positive for drugs; amidst calls for Russia to be disqualified, Titov was given a one-year ban on 15 February 2004.

Russia were drawn in Group A with hosts Portugal, Spain, and Greece. They were not among the favourites to progress and tournament preparations were hampered by injuries to defenders Sergei Ignashevich and Viktor Onopko. Russia started their tournament against Spain but a late goal from Juan Carlos Valerón put Russia on the brink of another group stage elimination. Four days later, Russia became the first team eliminated after a 0–2 defeat to Portugal. The final game of the group resulted in a surprising 2–1 victory over eventual champions Greece with Dmitri Kirichenko scoring one of the fastest goals of the tournament.

In the 2006 World Cup qualifying tournament, Russia was drawn into Group 3 with Portugal, Slovakia, Estonia, Latvia, Luxembourg, and Liechtenstein. Russia began qualification with a 1–1 draw against Slovakia on 4 September 2004 in Moscow and then beat Luxembourg 4–0, but suffered a 7–1 defeat against Portugal in Lisbon, which remains Russia's worst defeat. Victories against Estonia and Liechtenstein seemed to put them back on track, but a 1–1 draw with Estonia on 30 March 2005 in Tallinn was a major disappointment which saw the end of Georgi Yartsev's reign. Under new manager Yury Syomin, Russia were able to rekindle their hopes with a 2–0 win against Latvia before a 1–1 draw in Riga on 17 August 2005. Russia then had victories against Liechtenstein, Luxembourg and a 0–0 draw against Portugal. In their final game, Russia needed to win against Slovakia in Bratislava. After a 0–0 draw, Slovakia advanced to the play-offs above Russia on goal difference.

=== Euro 2008 ===
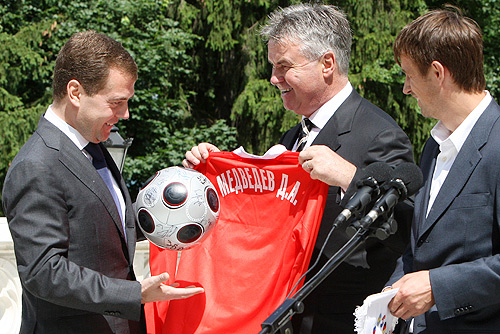
Manager Guus Hiddink and midfielder Sergei Semak meet the President of Russia, Dmitry Medvedev, after reaching the semi-finals of UEFA Euro 2008.

Having failed to qualify Russia for the 2006 World Cup, Yury Syomin stepped down several weeks later and Russia began looking for a new manager. It was clear that a foreign manager would be needed as most of the high-profile Russian coaches were not successful with the national team. On 10 April 2006, it was announced that then-Australia manager Guus Hiddink would lead Russia in the Euro 2008 qualification campaign.

For the Euro 2008 qualifying campaign, Russia were drawn into Group E with England, Croatia, Israel, Macedonia, Estonia, and Andorra. For much of the campaign, it was between Russia and England to obtain the final qualifying place behind Croatia. Russia lost 3–0 away to England, and in the return game in Moscow, fell to an early goal from Wayne Rooney. During the second half Russia came from behind to win 2–1 with Roman Pavlyuchenko scoring both goals. On 17 November 2007, Russia suffered a 2–1 defeat to Israel to put qualification hopes in jeopardy, but Russia still managed to qualify one point ahead of England by beating Andorra 1–0 while England lost 3–2 to Croatia.

In the Euro 2008 tournament, Russia were drawn into Group D with Sweden and Euro 2004 group rivals Spain and Greece. In a preparation friendly against Serbia, leading striker Pavel Pogrebnyak was injured and would miss the tournament. Russia lost their opening match 4–1 to Spain in Innsbruck but then beat Greece 1–0 with a goal by Konstantin Zyryanov. The third game saw Russia defeat Sweden 2–0 through goals by Roman Pavlyuchenko and Andrey Arshavin, resulting in Russia advancing to the quarter-finals in second place behind Spain. This was the first time ever since the fall of USSR, that saw Russia qualified from the group stage of a major tournament.

In the quarter-final against the Netherlands, Roman Pavlyuchenko scored a volley ten minutes after half-time. With four minutes left in the match, Ruud van Nistelrooy scored, to make it 1–1 and put the game into extra time. But Russia regained the lead when Andrey Arshavin raced down the left flank and sent across towards substitute Dmitri Torbinski, who tapped the ball into the net. Arshavin then beat Edwin van der Sar, ending the match 3–1, and sent Russia through to their first major semi-final since the breakup of the USSR. In the semi-finals, Russia was once again matched up against Spain, and lost 3–0.

=== 2010 FIFA World Cup qualification ===
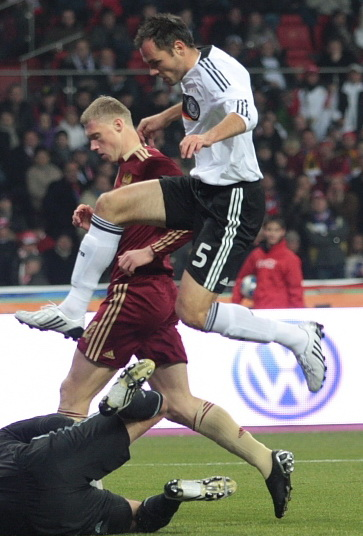
Russia lost 0–1 against Germany in 2010 FIFA World Cup qualification in October 2009

Russia was drawn to Group 4 in qualification for 2010 FIFA World Cup, competing with Germany, Finland, Wales, Azerbaijan and Liechtenstein. The team started the campaign with a 2–1 victory over Wales but on 11 October lost 2–1 to Germany. Russia's form then improved, and by winning 3–1 away to Wales on the same day as Finland drew 1–1 to Liechtenstein, guaranteed them at least a play-off spot. The match at the Luzhniki Stadium against Germany to top the group was watched by 84,500 fans. Miroslav Klose scored the only goal of the game in the 35th minute, sending the Germans to the finals in South Africa and Russia to a play-off.

On 14 November, Russia faced Slovenia in the first-leg of their two-legged play-off, where they won 2–1 with two goals from Diniyar Bilyaletdinov. In the return match, Russia lost 1–0 in Maribor, and Slovenia qualified for the finals on the away goals rule. On 13 February 2010, it was confirmed that Hiddink would leave his position as manager, with the expiration of his contract on 30 June.

=== Euro 2012 ===
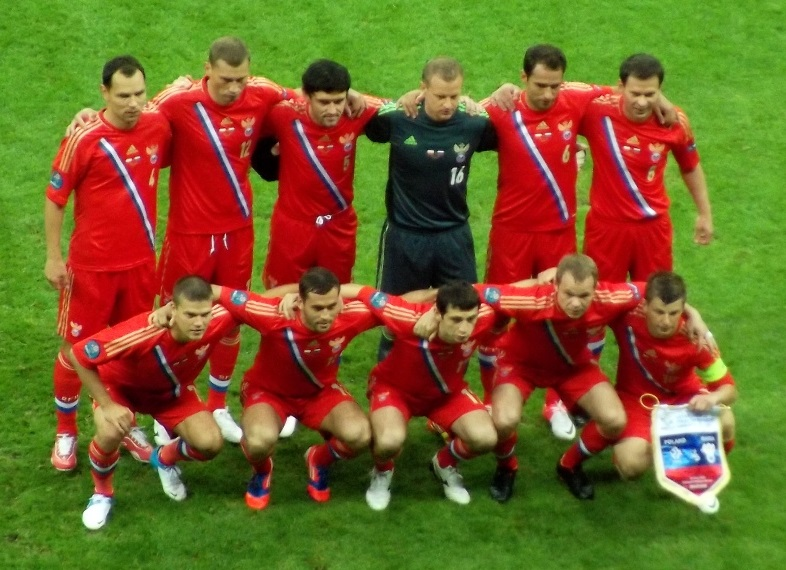
Russia against Poland in Euro 2012

Russia directly qualified for Euro 2012 by winning qualifying Group B, defeating Slovakia, the Republic of Ireland, Macedonia, Armenia and Andorra. Russia were drawn into Group A with Poland, the Czech Republic and Greece. Led by Dick Advocaat, Russia had been unbeaten for nearly 15 games and managed to record a 3–0 win against Italy one week before the Euro 2012's opening game kick-off. The Sbornaya started off the tournament with a 4–1 win over the Czech Republic and temporarily went top of the group with three points. Alan Dzagoev netted twice and Roman Shirokov and Roman Pavlyuchenko scored. In the second game against co-host Poland, Advocaat's side saw Dzagoev continue his fine form. He netted the opener, but Poland managed to equalise in the second half. Despite having drawn, the result wasn't seen as a bad one. A game against Greece finished with a 1–0 loss which eliminated the Russians from the tournament.

The group stage exit resulted in a hostile reaction from fans and media. Advocaat and most of the team, such as Andrey Arshavin, were heavily criticized for their perceived overconfidence.

=== 2014 FIFA World Cup ===
In July 2012, the Italian Fabio Capello was named as the new Russian manager, after being sacked by England in February.

Russia competed in Group F of World Cup qualification and qualified in first place after a 1–1 draw with Azerbaijan in their last game. In January 2014, Capello was rewarded with a new four-year contract to last up to the 2018 FIFA World Cup in Russia.

Russia played in Group H against South Korea, Belgium and Algeria. In their first group match, against South Korea, goalkeeper Igor Akinfeev fumbled a long-range shot from Lee Keun-ho, dropping it over the line to give the Koreans the lead. Russia then went on to equalise through substitute Aleksandr Kerzhakov, who drew equal to Vladimir Beschastnykh's record 26 goals for Russia, and the match finished 1–1. In the second match, Russia held Belgium at 0–0 at the Maracanã until substitute Divock Origi scored the only goal in the 88th minute. The final group stage match between Algeria and Russia on 26 June ended 1–1, advancing Algeria and eliminating Russia. A win for Russia would have seen them qualify, and they led the game 1–0 after six minutes through Aleksandr Kokorin. In the 60th minute of the game, a laser was shone in Akinfeev's face while he was defending from an Algerian free kick, from which Islam Slimani scored to equalise. Both Akinfeev and Russian coach Fabio Capello blamed the laser for the decisive conceded goal.

=== Euro 2016 ===
Russia were placed in Group G of UEFA Euro 2016 qualifying alongside Sweden, Austria, Montenegro, Moldova and Liechtenstein. Russia began with a 4–0 win against Liechtenstein. This was followed by a string of shaky performances by Russia, two 1–1 draws against Sweden and Moldova and two 1–0 losses against Austria. Russia were awarded a 3–0 victory against Montenegro due to crowd violence. At this stage, Russia looked to be finishing third in their group before they bounced back by winning their remaining matches against Sweden, Liechtenstein, Moldova and Montenegro to finish second in their qualifying group above Sweden and qualify for UEFA Euro 2016.

During the group stages of the tournament, UEFA imposed a suspended disqualification on Russia for crowd riots during a group match against England. Russia were knocked out of the competition in their final group match which was against Wales (a 3–0 defeat); prior to this they had only collected a single point from a 1–1 draw against England which was followed by a 2–1 loss to Slovakia.

=== 2017 FIFA Confederations Cup ===
Russia qualified for the 2017 Confederations Cup as hosts, yet once again produced a dismal performance. After defeating New Zealand 2–0, Russia disappointed its fans by losing 0–1 to Portugal and 1–2 to Mexico, thus once again crashed out from the group stage of a major FIFA tournament. Despite this dismal performance, Stanislav Cherchesov, appointed as coach of Russia after Euro 2016, was allowed to keep the job.

=== 2018 FIFA World Cup ===
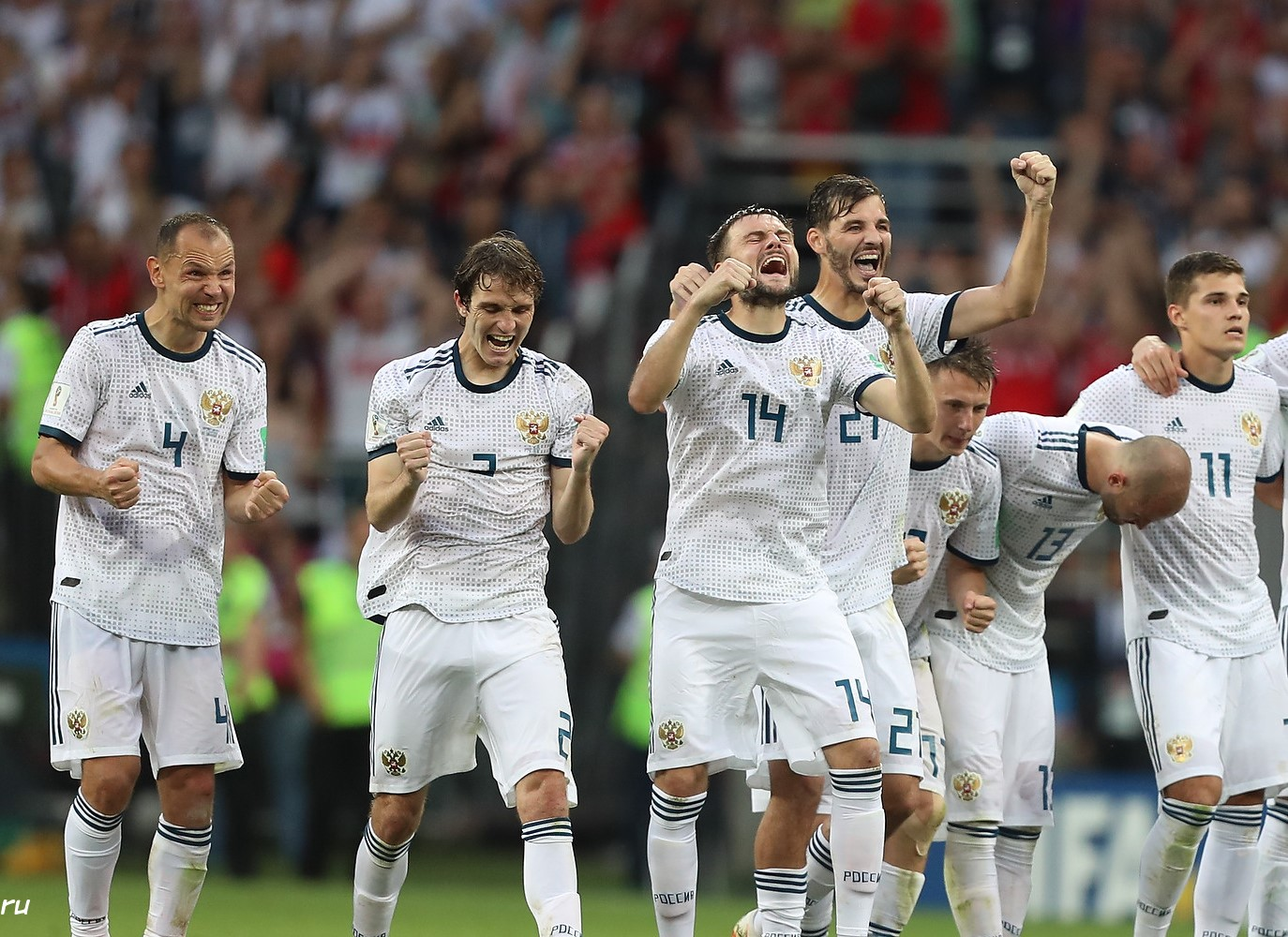
Russian team during the penalty shoot-out in the first knockout round against Spain at the 2018 FIFA World Cup

On 2 December 2010, Russia were selected to host the 2018 World Cup and automatically qualified for the tournament. During the friendly matches prior to the tournament, Russia did not have good results. The team lost more games than it won and this made their FIFA ranking fall to 70th, the lowest among all World Cup participants. Russia were drawn to play Saudi Arabia, Egypt and Uruguay in the group stage.

Despite a series of poor results in warm-up games, however, Russia began their World Cup campaign with a 5–0 demolition of Saudi Arabia, who were three places above them in the rankings, on 14 June in the opening match of the 2018 FIFA World Cup. On 19 June, Russia won their second game of the group stage, beating Egypt by a scoreline of 3–1, taking their goal difference to +7 with only two matches played. The win over Egypt all but secured Russia's advancement into the knockout stage for the first time since 1986, when they played as the Soviet Union; and also for the first time in their history as an independent state. They officially qualified for the knockout stage the next day, following Uruguay's 1–0 win over Saudi Arabia. Russia's final group game was against two-time world champions (1930 and 1950) Uruguay, losing 3–0, and finished second in the group.

Advancing from their group in second place, Russia faced Spain at the Round of 16 in Moscow. Spain were considered one of the tournament favorites with many accomplished players at club and international level, having won the 2010 edition. Russia managed to surprise Spain in one of the biggest shocks in World Cup history; beating them in a penalty shootout after the match ended 1–1 in regular time. BBC Sport and The Guardian described this as one of the biggest tournament surprises, considering how Russia were the lowest-ranked team prior to the competition, and according to some, had one of the worst teams of the competition. Against the Spaniards who were known for their tiki-taka, coach Stanislav Cherchesov used a defensive 5–3–1–1 formation to sit deep and defend with ten men, and conceded no goals from open play as Spain's only goal was from a free kick set piece while Russia tied the game thanks for a penalty awarded for a handball. Igor Akinfeev, who saved two penalties including a foot-save to deny Spain's Iago Aspas, was voted as Budweiser Man of the Match. The win against Spain sent supporters and residents of Russia into wild celebrations, as they reached the quarter-finals for the first time since the breakup of the Soviet Union. Match TV commentator Denis Kazansky said: "From the first day we had not been expecting much from our team. Then thoughts turned to winning the thing. What we have seen is a significant change in people's attitudes, and in the history of Russian football."

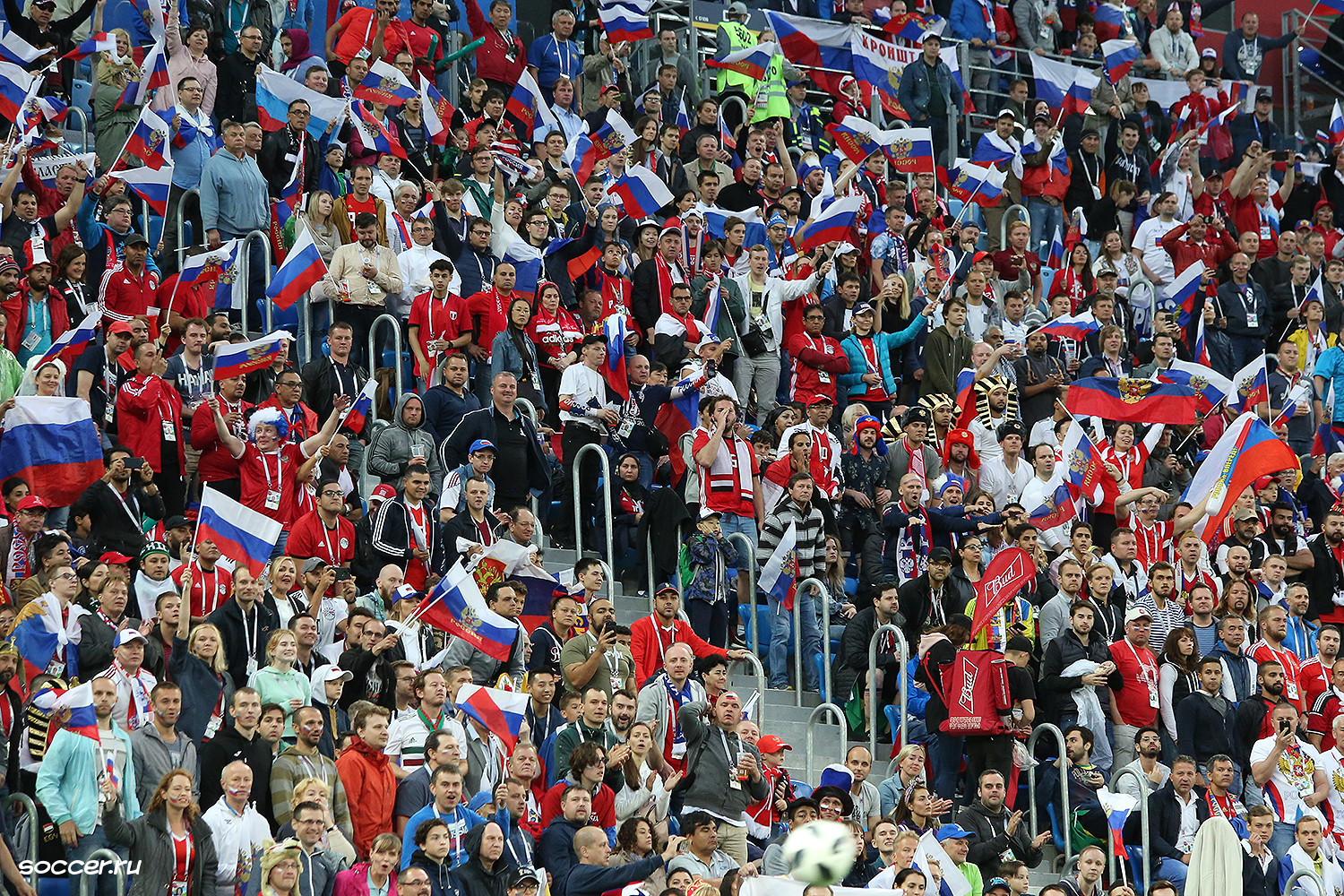
Russia football supporters at the 2018 FIFA World Cup

Russia then played Croatia in the quarter-finals held at Sochi, on 7 July. Coach Stanislav Cherchesov reverted to a four-man defense which successfully exploited Croatia offensive set-up which proved vulnerable to Russia's counter-attacking. Russia scored first (a long-range strike by Denis Cheryshev which was his fourth goal of the tournament and was later nominated for the Puskás Award) and last (a header from Mário Fernandes at the 115th minute) as the match finished 2–2 after extra time, and then were eliminated 3–4 in the penalty shootout. Nonetheless, this stands as Russia's best World Cup performance ever since the dissolution of the USSR. The team visited the FIFA Fan Fest in Moscow on Sunday, 8 July 2018, to thank their supporters and say goodbye. Following the World Cup run, Russia's position in the FIFA ranking rose from 70 to 40.

=== 2018–19 UEFA Nations League ===
Russia participated in the UEFA Nations League for the first time, where they were drawn with Turkey and Sweden. Russia had a promising start, with two wins over Turkey and a home draw to Sweden. However, Russia wasted its opportunity to promote to League A after getting a 0–2 away defeat to Sweden, thus losing their first place to the Swedes instead and was forced to stay in League B.

=== Euro 2020 ===
In qualification, the Russian side was drawn in Group I with Belgium, Kazakhstan, San Marino, Cyprus and Scotland. With the exception of its 1–3 loss to the Belgians away, Russia defeated other group opponents. The Russian team defeated San Marino 9–0 after the two 7–0 wins in 1995 and in 2015. Russia also defeated Scotland, Cyprus and Kazakhstan twice and qualified for the UEFA Euro 2020. Russia consolidated its second place in the group despite being thrashed by number-one ranked Belgium 1–4 at home.

Russia lost their first match against Belgium in a 3–0 defeat, but won their second match against Finland 1–0. However, Russia were knocked out of the competition in their final group match against Denmark where they lost 4–1. Following Russia's exit from the competition, Stanislav Cherchesov was sacked as coach.

=== 2020–21 UEFA Nations League ===
Russia competed in the League B for the season, thereby matching up with Turkey, Serbia and Hungary. Russia began comfortably, beating Serbia and Hungary to take the first place. In their last two games, they suffered two losses in Turkey and 0–5 in Serbia and finished the group in second place, remaining in League B.

=== 2022 FIFA World Cup qualification ===
Russia was drawn to Group H for the 2022 FIFA World Cup qualification, competing with Croatia, Slovakia, Slovenia, Cyprus, and Malta. After losing to Croatia, Russia finished second and advanced to the play-offs. The game against Croatia in November 2021 would turn out to be Russia's last official game before being banished from the world of football under the auspices of FIFA and UEFA following 2022 invasion of Ukraine.

=== Since 2022: suspensions and potential AFC move ===
In the wake of the Russian invasion of Ukraine, several nations, including Albania, UK Home Nations of England, Scotland, Wales, and Russia's 2022 FIFA World Cup qualifying play-off opponents Poland, Sweden and the Czech Republic, said they would refuse to play Russia. On 27 February, FIFA initially announced a ban on any international competition being played in Russia, with any "home" matches having to be played on neutral territory behind closed doors, and ordered that Russia compete under the name of the Russian Football Union (RFU) and without being allowed to display the Russian flag or play the Russian national anthem. This followed a decision taken by UEFA two days prior that stripped Saint Petersburg of hosting the 2022 UEFA Champions League final, which had been due to be held at Krestovsky Stadium, in addition to banning any UEFA-sanctioned matches from occurring in Russia.

The decision was criticized by many as inadequate, and the next day FIFA and UEFA relented and issued blanket bans on Russian participation in international football, effectively barring them from participating in the 2022 World Cup qualifying play-off. This was in accordance with a recommendation by the International Olympic Committee (IOC). The Russian Football Union unsuccessfully appealed the FIFA and UEFA bans to the Court of Arbitration for Sport, which upheld the bans. On 20 September 2022, UEFA decided to ban Russia from participating in UEFA Euro 2024.

In response to the disqualification and suspension of Russia from all international football activities, especially within Europe, President of the Russian Football Union, Alexander Dyukov, implied that Russia should begin to discuss about moving to the AFC in order to continue competing in major international tournaments. In December 2022, the RFU Executive Committee opted to vote about the matter, but their attempt to move to the AFC did not materialise; instead, the RFU opted to create a working group with the aim of bringing Russia back to European competition. Still, Dyukov attended the AFC Congress in Manama in February 2023, which increased speculation about Russia's possible move to the AFC as the country was initially invited to compete in the CAFA Nations Cup, held by Central Asian nations that were formerly part of the Russian Empire and Soviet Union (except Kazakhstan), which Russia later chose not to enter. On 5 April 2023, UEFA president, Aleksander Čeferin, decided to extend the ban, stating it was "very hard" to lift it until the war is over, ensuring Russia's isolation from European football process.

At the same time, Russia has also increasingly pivoted football games to Asia. From late 2022 to early 2023, Russia played six AFC opponents, Kyrgyzstan, Uzbekistan, Tajikistan, Iran, Iraq and Qatar. In response, critics claim that the AFC does not offer the "same amount of power like in Europe" when compared to "lucrative European competitions". Magomed Adiyev, the current head coach of Kazakhstan national football team (Kazakhstan moved from the AFC to UEFA in 2002), also claimed that Russia should not move and rather "wait until further development". However, Australia, Japan, South Korea, three major AFC members, has urged the AFC not to allow Russia in even if they decided on doing so. Still, according to Martin Lowe, the AFC has a significant number of members that are sympathetic to Russia, mainly in West and South Asia, as well as China, plus with several Central Asian countries (including Kazakhstan, which is the first UEFA nation to send a national team to play Russia since the invasion of Ukraine after Belarus), which could undermine Australia, Japan and South Korea's efforts due to their limited voices against the wider pro-Russian opinions in the AFC.

In December 2023, the Russian Football Union decided not to apply for the transfer to AFC at the time (the application has to be made six months before the end of UEFA's reporting year in June), as the FIFA ban from official international competitions remained in effect. The RFU agreed to re-consider the transfer in the future depending on FIFA or UEFA's actions.

In 2024, Russia decided to play against opponents from Asia once again, as they participated in the 2024 LPBank Cup held in Vietnam. Russia was scheduled to face Vietnam and Thailand. They defeated Vietnam 3–0, however, the match against Thailand was cancelled for safety reasons due to Typhoon Yagi. On 15 November, Russia recorded its biggest ever victory as they thrashed Brunei 11–0 at the Krasnodar Stadium, before defeating Syria 4–0 in the following friendly, adding the number of Asian opponents Russia have played to nine. On 20 November 2024, shortly after the conclusion of the 2024–25 UEFA Nations League group stages, Russia were confirmed to be banned from the entire 2026 FIFA World Cup qualification, which raised further questions over Russia's affiliation to UEFA. On 7 June 2026, the ban was extended to encompass the 2026–27 season.

== Team image ==
=== Kits and crests ===
Following the break up of the Soviet Union, the Russian Football Union replaced the red and white Adidas kits with strips supplied by Reebok in red, blue and white reflecting the readopted national flag of Russia. In 1997, Nike decided on a simpler design used at the 2002 FIFA World Cup and Euro 2004, consisting of mainly a white base with blue trim and the opposite combination for the away kit. After failing to qualify for the 2006 FIFA World Cup, Nike reintroduced red, this time as the home kit, while white being reversed as the away colour. This trend was continued by Adidas, who took over as suppliers in 2008. The 2009–10 season marked yet another change with the introduction of the maroon and gold as the primary home colours. A return to red and white was made in 2011. The edition of the kit used at Euro 2012 featured a red base with gold trim and a Russian flag positioned diagonally while the away kit was a minimalistic white with red trim. The 2014 FIFA World Cup kit made a return to the maroon and gold colour scheme, with Russian flag-coloured stripes built horizontally into the sleeves, the front includes the pattern in different shades of maroon depicting the Monument to the Conquerors of Space. The away 2014 kit was mostly white with blue trim, the top of the front below the trim shows the view of Earth from space. The sides and back of the collar were made in the colours of the Russian flag. The 2018 FIFA World Cup kit did not have much decorations in it, except for the coat of arms. Home red shirt had a very similar design to the uniform of Soviet Union Olympic football team it used at the 1988 Summer Olympics, the last major tournament as of 2018 that Russia or USSR won. The back side of the inside of the shirt had "Together to Victory" (Russian: Вместе к победе, romanized: Vmeste k pobede) slogan printed below the collar.

The Russia national team's official shirt supplier from 2008 to 2022 was Adidas. The contract was unilaterally terminated by the German giant after the Russian invasion of Ukraine.

Jögel is currently the team's official sponsor starting from 2024. Jögel's deal with the Russian national team took effect in early 2024 and lasts until 2026. The contract was later extended to 2030.

=== Kit suppliers ===
Period	Supplier
1992–1993	(Germany) Adidas
1993–1996	(United States) Reebok
1997–2008	(United States) Nike
2008–2023	(Germany) Adidas (Note: Following Western sanctions imposed on Russia in 2022 due to the invasion of Ukraine, Adidas terminated its contract with the Russian Football Union with immediate effect. Despite the termination, kits manufactured in 2020 continued to be used in international friendly matches without an official partnership or endorsement from the company until the team transitioned to Jögel in 2024.)
2024–	(Russia) Jögel

==== Kit deals ====
Kit supplier	Period	Contract announcement	Contract duration	Value
(Germany) Adidas	2008–2022	2008-09-08	2008–2018	Undisclosed
(Germany) Adidas	2008–2022	2018-05-31	2018–2022	Undisclosed

== Results and fixtures ==
The following is a list of match results in the last 12 months, as well as any future matches that have been scheduled.

Win Draw Loss Fixture

=== 2026 ===
27 March Friendly	Russia	3–1	Nicaragua	Krasnodar, Russia
19:30 UTC+3	Sadulayev 3'; Tyukavin 45+3' (pen.); Golovin 83'	Report	Acevedo 16'; Reyes (red card) 47'	Stadium: Krasnodar Stadium; Attendance: 31,625; Referee: Abdurashid Khudoyberganov (Uzbekistan)

31 March Friendly	Russia	0–0	Mali	Saint Petersburg, Russia
20:00 UTC+3		Report		Stadium: Krestovsky Stadium; Attendance: 34,837; Referee: Rustam Lutfullin (Uzbekistan)

28 May Friendly	Egypt	1–0	Russia	Cairo, Egypt
21:00 UTC+3	Ziko 65'	Report		Stadium: Misr Stadium; Attendance: 35,000; Referee: Lahlou Benbraham (Algeria)

5 June Friendly	Russia	3–0	Burkina Faso	Volgograd, Russia
20:00 UTC+3	Sadulayev 15'; Al. Miranchuk 20'; Vakhaniya 73'	Report		Stadium: Volgograd Arena; Attendance: 41,035; Referee: Nenad Minaković (Serbia)

9 June Friendly	Russia	3–0	Trinidad and Tobago	Kaliningrad, Russia
20:00 UTC+3	Beveyev 7'; Silyanov 15'; Batrakov 60'	Report		Stadium: Kaliningrad Stadium; Attendance: 27,618; Referee: Nenad Minaković (Serbia)

29 September Friendly	Russia	2–0	Iran	Kazan, Russia
19:00 UTC+3	Golovin 21', 36'	Report		Stadium: Kazan Arena; Attendance: 34,362; Referee: Ilgiz Tantashev (Uzbekistan)

3 October Friendly	Russia	6–0	Namibia	Yekaterinburg, Russia
18:00 UTC+3	Sadulayev 37'; Prutsev 54'; Tyukavin 65'; Glushenkov 85'; Petrov 87' (pen.); Ndisiro 90+3' (o.g.)	Report		Stadium: Yekaterinburg Arena; Attendance: 27,156; Referee: Abdurashid Khudoyberganov (Uzbekistan)

6 October Friendly	Russia	3–3	Nigeria	Nizhny Novgorod, Russia
19:00 UTC+3	Sadulayev 30'; Kislyak 45+2'; Al. Miranchuk 54'	Report	Iheanacho 10'; Edokpolor 78'; Adams 90+4'	Stadium: Nizhny Novgorod Stadium; Attendance: 40,126; Referee: Nikola Dabanović (Montenegro)

12 November Friendly	Uzbekistan	2–3	Russia	Tashkent, Uzbekistan
20:00 UTC+5	Melyokhin 5' (o.g.); Karimov 46'	Report	Komlichenko 70', 75'; Al. Miranchuk 79'	Stadium: Pakhtakor Central Stadium; Attendance: 9,815; Referee: Sadullo Gulmurodi (Tajikistan)

17 November Friendly	Russia	2–0	Venezuela	Krasnodar, Russia
19:00 UTC+3	Al. Miranchuk 59', 75'	Report		Stadium: Krasnodar Stadium; Attendance: 31,701; Referee: Firdavs Norsafarov (Uzbekistan)

== Coaching staff ==
Position	Name
Head coach	(Russia) Valery Karpin
Assistant coach	(Russia) Nikolai Pisarev (Russia) Yuriy Nikiforov (Russia) Viktor Onopko
Goalkeeping coach	(Turkmenistan) Vitaly Kafanov
Fitness coach	(Spain) Luis Martínez
Analyst	(Spain) Jonatan Alba

=== Manager history ===
As of 17 November 2026.

No.	Name	Start	End	Matches	Won	Drawn	Lost	Win %	Competitions
1	(Russia) Pavel Sadyrin	16 July 1992	28 July 1994	23	12	6	5	52	1994 World Cup – Group stage
2	(Russia) Oleg Romantsev	28 July 1994	11 July 1996	25	17	4	4	68	UEFA Euro 1996 – Group stage
3	(Russia) Boris Ignatyev	11 July 1996	19 June 1998	20	8	8	4	40	
4	(Russia) Anatoliy Byshovets	24 July 1998	20 December 1998	6	0	0	6	0	
5	(Russia) Oleg Romantsev	28 December 1998	8 July 2002	35	19	10	6	54	2002 World Cup – Group stage
6	(Russia) Valery Gazzaev	8 July 2002	25 August 2003	9	4	2	3	44	
7	(Russia) Georgi Yartsev	25 August 2003	5 April 2005	19	8	6	5	42	UEFA Euro 2004 – Group stage
8	(Russia) Yuri Semin	18 April 2005	31 December 2005	7	3	4	0	43	
C	(Russia) Aleksandr Borodyuk	1 January 2006	9 July 2006	2	0	1	1	0	
9	(Netherlands) Guus Hiddink	9 July 2006	30 June 2010	39	22	7	10	56	UEFA Euro 2008 – Semi-finals
10	(Netherlands) Dick Advocaat	15 July 2010	16 June 2012	23	12	7	4	52	UEFA Euro 2012 – Group stage
11	(Italy) Fabio Capello	26 July 2012	14 July 2015	33	17	11	5	52	2014 World Cup – Group stage
12	(Russia) Leonid Slutsky	7 August 2015	30 June 2016	13	6	2	5	46	UEFA Euro 2016 – Group stage
13	(Russia) Stanislav Cherchesov	11 August 2016	8 July 2021	57	24	13	20	42	2017 Confederations Cup – Group stage 2018 World Cup – Quarter-finals; UEFA Euro 2020 – Group stage
14	(Russia) Valeri Karpin	26 July 2021		40	27	10	3	67	

== Players ==
=== Current squad ===
The following players were called up for the friendly matches against Uzbekistan and Venezuela on 12 and 17 November 2026, respectively.

Information correct as of as of 17 November 2026, after the match against Venezuela.

No.	Pos.	Player	Date of birth (age)	Caps	Goals	Club
1	GK	Matvey Safonov	25 February 1999 (age 27)	21	0	(French Football Federation) Paris Saint-Germain
12	GK	Stanislav Agkatsev	9 January 2002 (age 24)	7	0	(Russian Football Union) Krasnodar
16	GK	Maksim Borisko	15 February 2000 (age 26)	0	0	(Russian Football Union) CSKA Moscow
2	DF	Ilya Vakhaniya	14 January 2001 (age 25)	17	2	(Russian Football Union) Krasnodar
3	DF	Kirill Danilov	12 August 2007 (age 19)	4	0	(Russian Football Union) CSKA Moscow
4	DF	Viktor Melyokhin	16 December 2003 (age 22)	12	0	(Russian Football Union) Rostov
5	DF	Andrei Langovich	28 May 2003 (age 23)	2	0	(Russian Football Union) Rostov
14	DF	Turpal-Ali Ibishev	18 February 2002 (age 24)	3	0	(Russian Football Union) Akhmat Grozny
20	DF	Yevgeny Morozov	14 February 2001 (age 25)	10	1	(Russian Football Union) Lokomotiv Moscow
22	DF	Mingiyan Beveyev	30 November 1995 (age 30)	14	1	(Russian Football Union) Baltika Kaliningrad
23	DF	Danil Krugovoy	28 May 1998 (age 28)	19	0	(Russian Football Union) CSKA Moscow
24	DF	Aleksandr Silyanov	17 February 2002 (age 24)	19	2	(Russian Football Union) Lokomotiv Moscow
	DF	Maksim Osipenko	16 May 1994 (age 32)	20	3	(Russian Football Union) Dynamo Moscow
6	MF	Aleksei Mironov	1 January 2000 (age 26)	2	0	(Russian Football Union) Rostov
8	MF	Aleksey Batrakov	9 June 2005 (age 21)	17	4	(Turkish Football Federation) Galatasaray
10	MF	Danil Glebov	3 November 1999 (age 27)	18	0	(Russian Football Union) Dynamo Moscow
15	MF	Matvey Kislyak	26 July 2005 (age 21)	15	2	(Russian Football Union) CSKA Moscow
19	MF	Artyom Karpukas	13 June 2002 (age 24)	6	0	(Russian Football Union) Zenit Saint Petersburg
25	MF	Danil Prutsev	25 March 2000 (age 26)	15	3	(Russian Football Union) Spartak Moscow
27	MF	Ivan Oblyakov	5 July 1998 (age 28)	24	5	(Russian Football Union) CSKA Moscow
	MF	Nail Umyarov	27 June 2000 (age 26)	8	0	(Russian Football Union) Spartak Moscow
7	FW	Nikolay Komlichenko	29 June 1995 (age 31)	12	3	(Russian Football Union) Lokomotiv Moscow
9	FW	Kirill Glebov	10 November 2005 (age 21)	8	0	(Russian Football Union) CSKA Moscow
11	FW	Aleksei Miranchuk	17 October 1995 (age 31)	58	15	(United States Soccer Federation) Atlanta United
17	FW	Lechi Sadulayev	8 January 2000 (age 26)	20	6	(Russian Football Union) Akhmat Grozny
18	FW	Konstantin Tyukavin	22 June 2002 (age 24)	14	3	(Russian Football Union) Dynamo Moscow
21	FW	Yaroslav Gladyshev	5 May 2003 (age 23)	5	4	(Russian Football Union) Dynamo Moscow

=== Recent call-ups ===
The following players have been called up to the national team in the past 12 months but are not part of the current squad.

Pos.	Player	Date of birth (age)	Caps	Goals	Club	Latest call-up
GK	Aleksandr Maksimenko	19 March 1998 (age 28)	6	0	(Russia) Spartak Moscow	v. Nigeria, 6 October 2026
GK	Anton Mitryushkin	8 February 1996 (age 30)	3	0	(Russia) Lokomotiv Moscow	v. Nigeria, 6 October 2026
GK	Denis Adamov	20 February 1998 (age 28)	1	0	(Russia) Zenit Saint Petersburg	v. Trinidad and Tobago, 9 June 2026
DF	Igor Diveyev	27 September 1999 (age 27)	21	1	(Russia) Zenit Saint Petersburg	v. Nigeria, 6 October 2026
DF	Arsen Adamov	20 October 1999 (age 27)	8	2	(Russia) Akhmat Grozny	v. Nigeria, 6 October 2026
DF	Ruslan Litvinov	18 August 2001 (age 25)	8	0	(Russia) Spartak Moscow	v. Mali, 31 March 2026
DF	Valentin Paltsev	12 July 2001 (age 25)	3	0	(Russia) Krasnodar	v. Mali, 31 March 2026
FW	Aleksandr Golovin (captain)	30 May 1996 (age 30)	53	11	(France) Monaco (Note: Monaco is a Monégasque club playing in the French football league system.)	v. Nigeria, 6 October 2026
MF	Maksim Glushenkov	28 July 1999 (age 27)	14	4	(Russia) Zenit Saint Petersburg	v. Nigeria, 6 October 2026
MF	Maksim Petrov	18 January 2001 (age 25)	5	1	(Russia) Baltika Kaliningrad	v. Nigeria, 6 October 2026
MF	Anton Miranchuk	17 October 1995 (age 31)	37	7	(Russia) Dynamo Moscow	v. Trinidad and Tobago, 9 June 2026
MF	Dmitri Barinov	11 September 1996 (age 30)	28	0	(Russia) CSKA Moscow	v. Trinidad and Tobago, 9 June 2026
MF	Nikita Krivtsov	18 August 2002 (age 24)	5	2	(Russia) Krasnodar	v. Trinidad and Tobago, 9 June 2026
MF	Amir Ibragimov	2 April 2008 (age 18)	2	0	(England) Manchester United	v. Trinidad and Tobago, 9 June 2026
MF	Daniil Fomin	2 March 1997 (age 29)	19	1	(Russia) Dynamo Moscow	v. Mali, 31 March 2026
FW	Aleksandr Sobolev	7 March 1997 (age 29)	18	6	(Russia) Zenit Saint Petersburg	v. Nigeria, 6 October 2026
FW	Dmitry Vorobyov	28 November 1997 (age 28)	4	1	(Russia) Krasnodar	v. Nigeria, 6 October 2026
FW	Ivan Sergeyev	11 May 1995 (age 31)	13	3	(Russia) Dynamo Moscow	v. Trinidad and Tobago, 9 June 2026
FW	Georgi Melkadze	4 April 1997 (age 29)	4	0	(Russia) Akhmat Grozny	v. Trinidad and Tobago, 9 June 2026
Notes: ^{INJ} = Not part of the current squad due to injury.; ^{PRE} = Preliminary squad/standby.

== Individual records ==
As of 12 November 2026.
Players in bold are still active with Russia.
This list does not include players who represented the Russian Empire (1910−1914), the Soviet Union (1924−1991) and the CIS (1992).

=== Most appearances ===
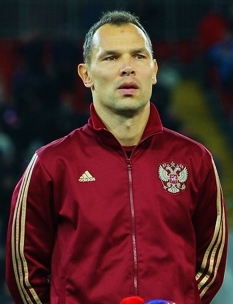
Sergei Ignashevich is the most capped player in Russian and USSR history with 127 caps.

Rank	Name	Caps	Goals	Period
1	Sergei Ignashevich	127	8	2002–2018
2	Igor Akinfeev	111	0	2004–2018
3	Viktor Onopko (Note: Viktor Onopko also made four appearances for the CIS.)	109	7	1992–2004
4	Yuri Zhirkov	105	2	2005–2021
5	Vasili Berezutski	101	5	2003–2016
6	Aleksandr Kerzhakov	90	30	2002–2016
7	Aleksandr Anyukov	76	1	2004–2013
8	Andrey Arshavin	74	17	2002–2012
9	Valery Karpin (Note: Valery Karpin also made one appearance for the CIS.)	72	17	1992–2003
10	Vladimir Beschastnykh	71	26	1992–2003

=== Top goalscorers ===
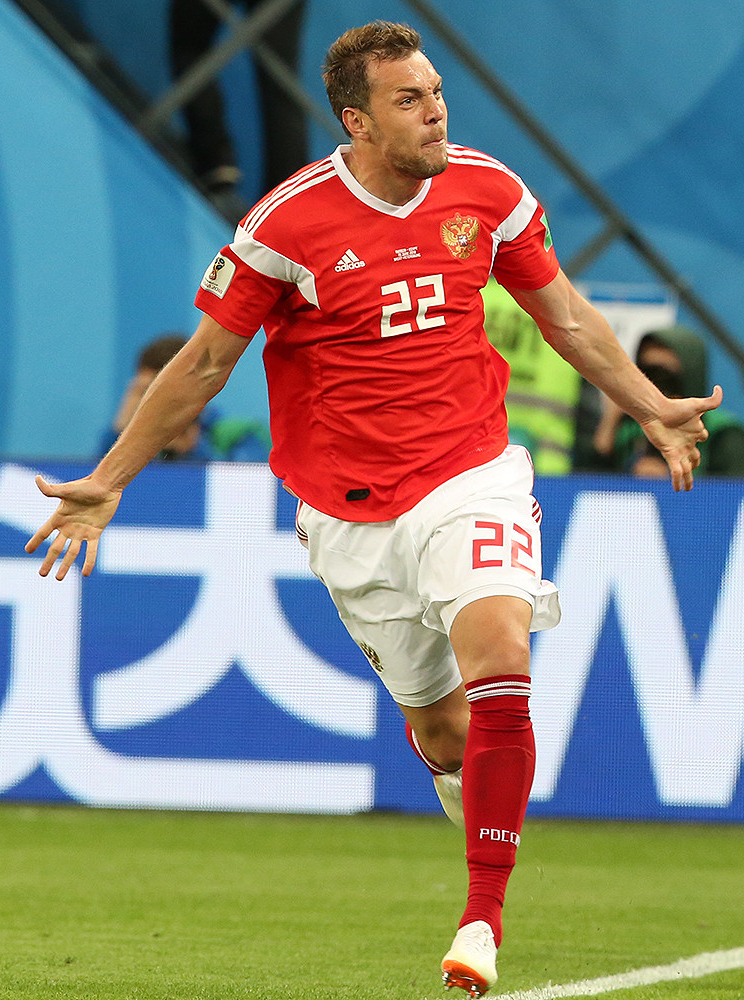
Artem Dzyuba is Russia's top scorer with 31 goals, behind Oleg Blokhin who scored 42 goals for the USSR.

Rank	Name	Goals	Caps	Average	Period
1	Artem Dzyuba	31	56	0.55	2011–2025
2	Aleksandr Kerzhakov	30	90	0.33	2002–2016
3	Vladimir Beschastnykh	26	71	0.37	1992–2003
4	Roman Pavlyuchenko	21	50	0.42	2003–2012
5	Valery Karpin	17	72	0.24	1992–2003
5	Andrey Arshavin	17	74	0.23	2002–2012
7	Fyodor Smolov	16	44	0.36	2012–2021
8	Dmitri Sychev	15	47	0.32	2002–2010
8	**Aleksei Miranchuk**	15	58	0.26	2015–present
10	Roman Shirokov	13	56	0.23	2008–2016

== Competitive record ==
=== FIFA World Cup ===
Champions Runners-up Third place

FIFA World Cup record										Qualification record						
Year	Result	Position	Pld	W	D	L	GF	GA	Squad	Pld	W	D	L	GF	GA	—
as Soviet Union										as Soviet Union						
(Uruguay) 1930	Did not enter									Declined invitation						1930
(Italy) 1934	Did not enter									Did not enter						1934
(France) 1938	Did not enter									Did not enter						1938
(Brazil) 1950	Did not enter									Did not enter						1950
(Switzerland) 1954	Did not enter									Did not enter						1954
(Sweden) 1958	Quarter-finals	6th	5	2	1	2	5	6	Squad	5	4	0	1	18	3	1958
(Chile) 1962	Quarter-finals	6th	4	2	1	1	9	7	Squad	4	4	0	0	11	3	1962
(England) 1966	Fourth place	4th	6	4	0	2	10	6	Squad	6	5	0	1	19	6	1966
(Mexico) 1970	Quarter-finals	5th	4	2	1	1	6	2	Squad	4	3	1	0	8	1	1970
(West Germany) 1974	Did not qualify									6	3	1	2	5	4	1974
(Argentina) 1978	Did not qualify									4	2	0	2	5	3	1978
(Spain) 1982	Second group stage	7th	5	2	2	1	7	4	Squad	8	6	2	0	20	2	1982
(Mexico) 1986	Round of 16	10th	4	2	1	1	12	5	Squad	8	4	2	2	13	8	1986
(Italy) 1990	Group stage	17th	3	1	0	2	4	4	Squad	8	4	3	1	11	4	1990
as Russia										as Russia						
(United States) 1994	Group stage	17th	3	1	0	2	7	6	Squad	8	5	2	1	15	4	1994
(France) 1998	Did not qualify									10	5	3	2	20	7	1998
(South Korea) (Japan) 2002	Group stage	22nd	3	1	0	2	4	4	Squad	10	7	2	1	18	5	2002
(Germany) 2006	Did not qualify									12	6	5	1	23	12	2006
(South Africa) 2010	Did not qualify									12	8	1	3	21	8	2010
(Brazil) 2014	Group stage	24th	3	0	2	1	2	3	Squad	10	7	1	2	20	5	2014
(Russia) 2018	Quarter-finals	8th	5	2	2	1	11	7	Squad	Qualified as hosts						2018
(Qatar) 2022	Disqualified from qualification play-offs by FIFA and UEFA									10	7	1	2	19	6	2022
(Canada) (Mexico) (United States) 2026	Banned									Banned						2026
(Morocco) (Portugal) (Spain) 2030	To be determined									To be determined						2030
(Saudi Arabia) 2034	To be determined									To be determined						2034
Total	Fourth place	11/23	45	19	10	16	77	54	—	125	80	24	21	246	81	—

=== UEFA European Championship ===
UEFA European Championship record										Qualifying record						
Year	Result	Position	Pld	W	D	L	GF	GA	Squad	Pld	W	D	L	GF	GA	—
as Soviet Union										as Soviet Union						
(France) 1960	Champions	1st	2	2	0	0	5	1	Squad	2	2	0	0	4	1	1960
(Spain) 1964	Runners-up	2nd	2	1	0	1	4	2	Squad	4	2	2	0	7	3	1964
(Italy) 1968	Fourth place	4th	2	0	1	1	0	2	Squad	8	6	0	2	19	8	1968
(Belgium) 1972	Runners-up	2nd	2	1	0	1	1	3	Squad	8	5	3	0	16	4	1972
(Socialist Federal Republic of Yugoslavia) 1976	Did not qualify									8	4	1	3	12	10	1976
(Italy) 1980	Did not qualify									6	1	3	2	7	8	1980
(France) 1984	Did not qualify									6	4	1	1	11	2	1984
(West Germany) 1988	Runners-up	2nd	5	3	1	1	7	4	Squad	8	5	3	0	14	3	1988
as CIS										as Soviet Union						
(Sweden) 1992	Group stage	8th	3	0	2	1	1	4	Squad	8	5	3	0	13	2	1992
as Russia										as Russia						
(England) 1996	Group stage	14th	3	0	1	2	4	8	Squad	10	8	2	0	34	5	1996
(Belgium) (Netherlands) 2000	Did not qualify									10	6	1	3	22	12	2000
(Portugal) 2004	Group stage	11th	3	1	0	2	2	4	Squad	10	5	3	2	20	12	2004
(Austria) (Switzerland) 2008	Semi-finals	3rd	5	3	0	2	7	8	Squad	12	7	3	2	18	7	2008
(Poland) (Ukraine) 2012	Group stage	9th	3	1	1	1	5	3	Squad	10	7	2	1	17	4	2012
(France) 2016	Group stage	23rd	3	0	1	2	2	6	Squad	10	6	2	2	21	5	2016
(Europe) 2020	Group stage	19th	3	1	0	2	2	7	Squad	10	8	0	2	33	8	2020
(Germany) 2024	Banned									Banned						2024
(United Kingdom) (Republic of Ireland) 2028	Banned									Banned						2028
(Italy) (Turkey) 2032	To be determined									To be determined						2032
Total	1 Title	12/18	36	13	7	16	40	52	—	128	80	29	19	262	89	—

=== UEFA Nations League ===
UEFA Nations League record
Season	Division	Group	Pld	W	D	L	GF	GA	P/R	RK
2018–19	B	2	4	2	1	1	4	3	Same position	17th
2020–21	B	3	6	2	2	2	9	12	Same position	24th
2022–23	B	2	Disqualified						▼	32nd
2024–25	Banned									
2026–27	Banned									
Total			10	4	3	3	13	15	17th	

=== FIFA Confederations Cup ===
FIFA Confederations Cup record
Year	Result	Position	Pld	W	D	L	GF	GA	Squad
(Saudi Arabia) 1992	Did not qualify								
(Saudi Arabia) 1995	Did not qualify								
(Saudi Arabia) 1997	Did not qualify								
(Mexico) 1999	Did not qualify								
(South Korea) (Japan) 2001	Did not qualify								
(France) 2003	Did not qualify								
(Germany) 2005	Did not qualify								
(South Africa) 2009	Did not qualify								
(Brazil) 2013	Did not qualify								
(Russia) 2017	Group stage	5th	3	1	0	2	3	3	Squad
Total	Group stage	1/10	3	1	0	2	3	3	—

== Head-to-head record ==
Include the records of the Russian Empire, the Soviet Union and the CIS before 1992.

As of 17 November 2026 after the match against Venezuela.

Positive Record Neutral Record Negative Record

Opponents	Pld	W	D	L	GF	GA	GD	Confederation
Albania	2	1	0	1	5	4	+1	UEFA
Algeria	4	1	3	0	6	5	+1	CAF
Andorra	6	6	0	0	21	2	+19	UEFA
Argentina	14	3	6	5	14	16	−2	CONMEBOL
Armenia	5	4	1	0	10	1	+9	UEFA
Austria	19	8	4	7	22	16	+6	UEFA
Australia	7	4	3	0	12	4	+8	AFC
Azerbaijan	5	3	2	0	9	2	+7	UEFA
Belarus	6	4	2	0	16	5	+11	UEFA
Belgium	13	4	2	7	17	24	−7	UEFA
Bolivia	2	2	0	0	5	1	+4	CONMEBOL
Brazil	15	3	3	9	13	28	−15	CONMEBOL
Brunei	1	1	0	0	11	0	+11	AFC
Burkina Faso	1	1	0	0	3	0	+3	CAF
Bulgaria	20	12	6	2	35	17	+18	UEFA
Cameroon	4	3	1	0	11	1	+10	CAF
Canada	2	2	0	0	4	1	+3	CONCACAF
Chile	8	4	2	2	11	7	+4	CONMEBOL
China	2	2	0	0	4	2	+2	AFC
Colombia	3	1	2	0	7	5	+2	CONMEBOL
Costa Rica	2	1	0	1	5	5	0	CONCACAF
Croatia	6	0	4	2	3	6	−3	UEFA
Cuba	2	2	0	0	16	0	+16	CONCACAF
Cyprus	11	10	1	0	36	3	+33	UEFA
Czech Republic (Note: Includes matches against Czechoslovakia.)	18	9	5	4	37	24	+13	UEFA
Denmark	13	10	1	2	37	14	+23	UEFA
East Germany	15	6	4	5	21	16	+5	UEFA
Egypt	2	1	0	1	3	2	+1	CAF
El Salvador	5	5	0	0	10	1	+9	CONCACAF
England	15	4	5	6	18	26	−8	UEFA
Estonia	5	3	1	1	10	3	+7	UEFA
Faroe Islands	4	4	0	0	12	2	+10	UEFA
Finland	19	13	5	1	56	13	+43	UEFA
France	21	8	7	6	36	30	+6	UEFA
Georgia	3	1	1	1	4	3	+1	UEFA
Germany (Note: Includes matches against West Germany.)	20	3	2	15	15	51	−36	UEFA
Ghana	1	1	0	0	1	0	+1	CAF
Greece	22	13	5	4	39	14	+25	UEFA
Grenada	1	1	0	0	5	0	+5	CONCACAF
Guatemala	1	1	0	0	3	0	+3	CONCACAF
Hungary	28	15	8	5	49	36	+13	UEFA
Iceland	12	7	4	1	20	6	+14	UEFA
India	2	2	0	0	16	1	+15	AFC
Indonesia	3	2	1	0	5	0	+5	AFC
Iran	7	4	2	1	9	4	+5	AFC
Iraq	1	1	0	0	2	0	+2	AFC
Israel	14	7	3	4	28	18	+10	UEFA
Italy	17	6	6	5	17	15	+2	UEFA
Ivory Coast	2	0	1	1	1	3	−2	CAF
Japan	4	3	0	1	11	3	+8	AFC
Jordan	1	0	1	0	0	0	0	AFC
Kazakhstan	4	3	1	0	11	0	+11	UEFA
Kenya	1	0	1	0	2	2	0	CAF
Kuwait	3	3	0	0	5	1	+4	AFC
Kyrgyzstan	1	1	0	0	2	1	+1	AFC
Latvia	4	3	1	0	7	2	+5	UEFA
Liechtenstein	6	6	0	0	19	1	+18	UEFA
Lithuania	4	3	1	0	11	4	+7	UEFA
Luxembourg	11	11	0	0	38	4	+34	UEFA
Mali	1	0	1	0	0	0	0	CAF
Malta	3	3	0	0	7	1	+6	UEFA
Mexico	14	5	7	2	17	6	+11	CONCACAF
Moldova	4	2	2	0	4	2	+2	UEFA
Montenegro	2	2	0	0	5	0	+5	UEFA
Morocco	5	4	1	0	10	3	+7	CAF
Myanmar	1	1	0	0	1	0	+1	AFC
Namibia	1	1	0	0	6	0	+6	CAF
Netherlands	11	4	3	4	11	14	−3	UEFA
New Zealand	2	2	0	0	5	0	+5	OFC
Nigeria	5	3	2	0	9	4	+5	CAF
Nicaragua	1	1	0	0	3	1	+2	CONCACAF
North Korea	2	2	0	0	6	0	+6	AFC
North Macedonia	4	4	0	0	7	0	+7	UEFA
Northern Ireland	6	3	2	1	6	2	+4	UEFA
Norway	13	7	4	2	24	11	+13	UEFA
Peru	4	2	2	0	5	1	+4	CONMEBOL
Poland	19	9	6	4	34	18	+16	UEFA
Portugal	11	3	1	7	9	15	−6	UEFA
Qatar	5	2	2	1	12	7	+5	AFC
Republic of Ireland	15	7	4	4	18	15	+3	UEFA
Romania	12	6	2	4	18	15	+3	UEFA
San Marino	4	4	0	0	25	0	+25	UEFA
Saudi Arabia	2	1	0	1	7	4	+3	AFC
Scotland	9	5	3	1	13	7	+6	UEFA
Serbia (Note: Includes matches against Yugoslavia and Serbia and Montenegro.)	33	19	10	4	57	31	+24	UEFA
Singapore	2	2	0	0	4	0	+4	AFC
Slovakia	23	10	7	2	31	21	+10	UEFA
Slovenia	7	4	1	2	11	8	+3	UEFA
South Korea	3	2	1	0	7	4	+3	AFC
Spain	14	3	5	6	15	19	−4	UEFA
Sudan	1	1	0	0	2	1	+1	CAF
Sweden	29	9	10	10	47	37	+10	UEFA
Switzerland	12	8	4	0	29	11	+18	UEFA
Syria	2	2	0	0	6	0	+6	AFC
Tajikistan	1	0	1	0	0	0	0	AFC
Trinidad and Tobago	2	2	0	0	5	0	+5	CONCACAF
Tunisia	2	2	0	0	5	0	+5	CAF
Turkey	24	18	3	3	43	12	+31	UEFA
Ukraine	2	0	1	1	3	4	−1	UEFA
United Arab Emirates	1	1	0	0	1	0	+1	AFC
United Team of Germany	1	1	0	0	2	1	+1	UEFA
United States	10	5	4	1	15	8	+7	CONCACAF
Uruguay	9	6	1	2	15	8	+7	CONMEBOL
Uzbekistan	2	1	1	0	3	2	+1	AFC
Venezuela	2	2	0	0	6	0	+6	CONMEBOL
Vietnam	2	1	0	1	3	1	+2	AFC
Wales	10	5	3	2	12	8	+4	UEFA
Zambia	3	3	0	0	12	1	+11	CAF
Total	733	387	193	160	1,294	664	+630	

== Home venues record ==
Venue	City	First match	Last match	Played	Won	Drawn	Lost	GF	GA	Average attendance
Lokomotiv	Moscow	16 August 1992	6 June 2014	28	16	8	4	56	20	20,592
Luzhniki	Moscow	14 October 1992	10 October 2019	33	20	8	5	55	21	41,881
Dynamo (Note: Includes matches played at the Central Dynamo Stadium, which was demolished in 2011. The VTB Arena was constructed in its place and opened in 2019.)	Moscow	29 May 1996	14 October 2020	18	11	7	0	36	11	15,556
Petrovsky	Saint Petersburg	20 August 1997	26 May 2014	9	8	0	1	19	3	18,119
Arsenal	Tula	19 May 1999	19 May 1999	1	0	1	0	1	1	13,000
Tsentralny	Volgograd	16 October 2002	5 June 2026	2	2	0	0	7	1	29,856
Kuban	Krasnodar	17 November 2004	14 November 2015	4	3	1	0	9	2	26,800
Tsentralny Profsoyuz	Voronezh	17 November 2010	17 November 2010	1	0	0	1	0	2	34,000
Tsentralny	Kazan	6 September 2013	6 September 2013	1	1	0	0	4	1	22,000
Arena Khimki	Khimki	3 September 2014	7 June 2015	4	3	1	0	12	2	6,109
Otkrytie Arena	Moscow	12 October 2014	21 June 2017	6	3	1	2	7	3	38,204
Olimp-2	Rostov-on-Don	17 November 2015	17 November 2015	1	0	0	1	1	3	15,000
Krasnodar Stadium	Krasnodar	9 October 2016	24 March 2017	5	0	2	3	6	7	30,100
Akhmat-Arena	Grozny	15 November 2016	15 November 2016	1	1	0	0	1	0	30,000
Fisht Olympic Stadium	Sochi	28 March 2017	15 November 2025	4	1	2	1	5	7	47,569
VEB Arena	Moscow	9 June 2017	8 October 2020	3	1	2	0	6	4	21,742
Krestovsky Stadium	Saint Petersburg	17 June 2017	16 November 2019	4	2	1	1	9	7	52,843
Ak Bars Arena	Kazan	24 June 2017	29 September 2026	3	1	1	1	4	3	37,428
Cosmos Arena	Samara	25 June 2018	25 June 2018	1	0	0	1	0	3	41,970
Rostov Arena	Rostov-on-Don	10 September 2018	10 September 2018	1	1	0	0	5	1	42,200
Kaliningrad Stadium	Kaliningrad	11 October 2018	9 September 2019	2	1	1	0	0	0	31,698
Rostec Arena	Kaliningrad	9 June 2026	9 June 2026	1	1	0	0	3	0	35,016
Yekaterinburg Arena	Yekaterinburg	3 October 2026	3 October 2026	1	1	0	0	6	0	27,156
Nizhny Novgorod Stadium	Nizhny Novgorod	6 October 2026	6 October 2026	1	0	1	0	3	3	40,126

== Honours ==
=== Global ===
- Olympic Games
  - (gold) Gold Medal (2): 1956^{1}, 1988^{1}
  - (bronze) Bronze Medal (3): 1972^{1}, 1976^{1}, 1980^{1}

=== Continental ===
- UEFA European Championship
  - (gold) Champions (1): 1960^{1}
  - (silver) Runners-up (3): 1964^{1}, 1972^{1}, 1988^{1}
  - (bronze) Bronze Medal (1): 2008

=== Friendly ===
- Nehru Cup
  - Champions (1): 1985
- Malta International Football Tournament
  - Champions (1): 1996
- Lunar New Year Cup
  - Champions (1): 1997
- Cyprus International Football Tournament
  - Champions (1): 2003

=== Awards ===
- Gazzetta Sports World Team of the Year: 1979

=== Summary ===
Competition	1st place, gold medalist(s)	2nd place, silver medalist(s)	3rd place, bronze medalist(s)	Total
Olympic Games	2	0	3	5
UEFA European Championship	1	3	1	5
Total	3	3	4	10

Notes

1. Honours won as Soviet Union.

== See also ==
- Russian Empire national football team
- Soviet Union national football team
- CIS national football team
- Russia national football B team
- Russia national under-21 football team
- Russia national under-20 football team
- Russia national under-19 football team
- Russia national under-17 football team
- Russia women's national football team
