= Murat Iskakov =

Russian footballer and manager (born 1972)

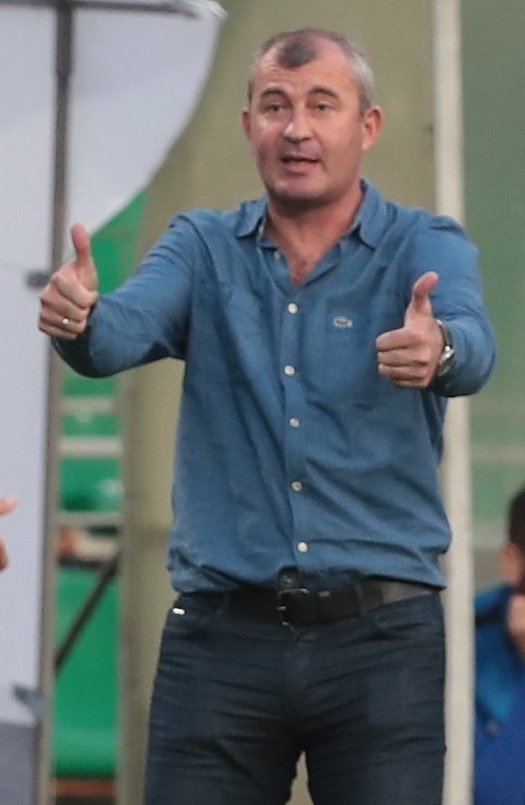
- Iskakov coaching Avangard Kursk in 2019

Personal information
- Full name: Murat Salimovich Iskakov
- Date of birth: 28 June 1972 (age 54)
- Height: 1.91 m (6 ft 3 in)
- Position: Defender

Team information
- Current team: PFC CSKA Moscow (assistant coach)

Senior career*
| Years | Team | Apps | (Gls) |
| 1993 | FC Avtozapchast Baksan | 16 | (0) |
| 1994–1996 | FC Torpedo Armavir | 90 | (0) |
| 1997 | FC Avtozapchast Baksan | 38 | (1) |
| 1998–2002 | PFC Spartak Nalchik | 135 | (2) |
| 2003 | FC Yelimay Semey | 19 | (1) |
| 2004 | FC Kaisar | 18 | (0) |
| 2005 | FC Semey | 22 | (3) |
| 2006 | FC Ekibastuzets | 27 | (0) |
| 2007 | FC Zhetysu | 15 | (0) |

Managerial career
- 2010: PFC Spartak Nalchik (assistant)
- 2011: FC Lokomotiv Moscow (assistant)
- 2011–2012: FC Anzhi Makhachkala (assistant)
- 2012–2013: FC Kuban Krasnodar (assistant)
- 2014–2015: Kazakhstan (assistant)
- 2016–2018: FC Tambov (assistant)
- 2018: FC Tambov
- 2018–2019: FC Tambov (assistant)
- 2019: FC Avangard Kursk
- 2020–2022: PFC Sochi (assistant)
- 2022–2024: PFC CSKA Moscow (assistant)
- 2024–2026: FC Akron Tolyatti (assistant)
- 2026: FC Akron Tolyatti (caretaker)
- 2026–: PFC CSKA Moscow (assistant)
- * Club domestic league appearances and goals

Murat Salimovich Iskakov (Russian: Мурат Салимович Искаков; born 28 June 1972) is a Russian football manager and a former player who is an assistant coach with PFC CSKA Moscow.

== Coaching career ==
On 21 August 2019, Iskakov was dismissed as manager of FC Avangard Kursk.

On 18 May 2026, Iskakov was chosen as caretaker manager of FC Akron Tolyatti for the 2025–26 Russian Premier League relegation play-offs. Akron defeated Rotor Volgograd 2–1 on aggregate in the play-offs and remained in the Premier League.
