= Valeri Skorodumov =

Russian football player

Personal information
- Full name: Valeri Vladimirovich Skorodumov
- Date of birth: 20 May 1992 (age 34)
- Place of birth: Moscow, Russia
- Height: 1.87 m (6 ft 2 in)
- Position: Midfielder

Youth career
- 1997–2004: FC Torpedo Moscow
- 2004–2010: FC Krylya Sovetov Moscow
- 2011–2012: FC Shinnik Yaroslavl

Senior career*
Years	Team	Apps	(Gls)
2012–2013	FC Olimpic Mytishchi (amateur)	38	(18)
2014	FC Biolog-Novokubansk	11	(0)
2014–2015	FC Yakutiya Yakutsk	10	(0)
2015–2016	FC Torpedo Moscow	21	(0)
2016–2019	FC Olimpic Mytishchi (amateur)		
Total		42	(0)

Managerial career
- 2019–2021: FC Torpedo Moscow (administrator)
- 2021–2024: FC Torpedo Moscow (team supervisor)
- 2024–2025: FC Torpedo Moscow (general director)
- * Club domestic league appearances and goals

Valeri Valerievich Skorodumov (Russian: Валерий Владимирович Скородумов; born 20 May 1992) is a Russian football official and a former player.

== Club career ==
He made his debut in the Russian Professional Football League for FC Biolog-Novokubansk on 10 April 2014 in a game against FC Gazprom transgaz Stavropol Ryzdvyany.

On 19 June 2025, FC Torpedo Moscow co-owner Leonid Sobolev and Skorodumov were arrested on suspicion of attempting to bribe referee Maksim Perezva. They are suspected of offering Perezva 6,000,000 rubles (approximately 66,000 euros) for giving Torpedo advantage in three games from March 2025 to May 2025 in which he was expected to be the referee, Perezva reported their offer to the police. The investigators searched their offices and homes, confiscating communication devices and documents. Formal charges were expected to be filed on 21 June 2025.

On 10 July 2025, Russian Football Union excluded Torpedo from the Premier League and banned Skorodumov from football activity for 10 years.
