= Jonatan Alba =

Spanish football coach (born 1984)

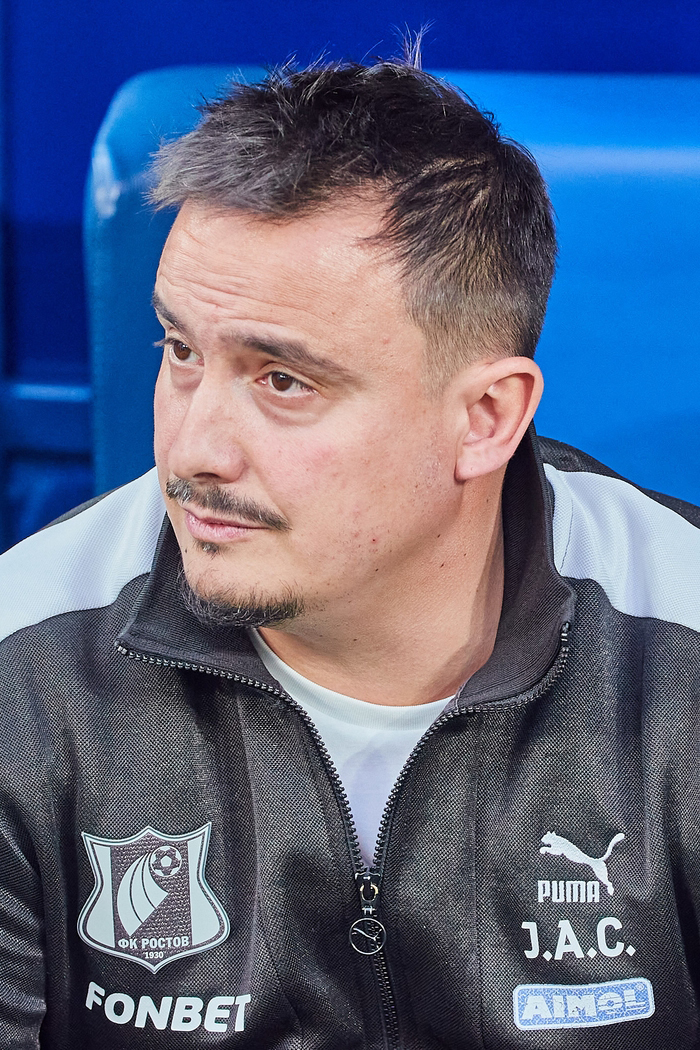
- Alba in 2025

Personal information
- Full name: Jonatan Alba Cabello
- Date of birth: 16 November 1981 (age 44)
- Place of birth: Madrid, Spain

Team information
- Current team: Rodina Moscow (manager)/ Russia (chief analyst)

Managerial career
- Years: Team
- 2013–2014: C.D Unión de Aravaca
- 2014: Internacional de Madrid
- 2021–: Russia (chief analyst)
- 2025–2026: Rostov
- 2026–: Rodina Moscow

Jonatan Alba Cabello (born 16 November 1981) is a Spanish football coach who is the manager of Russian Premier League club Rodina Moscow and the chief analyst for Russia national team.

== Managerial career ==
Alba worked in car insurance, but and played amateur football. After his wife suffered a miscarriage, Alba decided to change his profession and follow his dream career in football. He starting working as a coach in amateur football with C.D Unión de Aravaca and Internacional de Madrid, then as an analyst in Spain and with the Romania national team under Cosmin Contra. He met Valery Karpin in 2017, and in 2018 was an analyst at Rostov wit Karpin. In 2021 joined Karpin's team with the Russia national team.

On 25 February 2025, Alba was named the manager for Rostov, after Valery Karpin resigned. Alba left Rostov by mutual consent on 23 September 2026, keeping his job with Russia's national team.

On 8 October 2026, Alba signed a contract to manage Rodina Moscow running until the summer of 2028.

== Personal life ==
Born in Madrid, Alba is a childhood fan of Atlético de Madrid. He has a wife and 2 daughters.
