= Winline =

Russian sports betting company

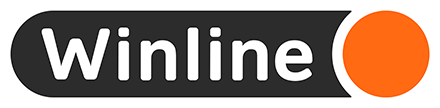
- Type: private company
- Industry: sports betting
- Incorporated: Russia
- Founded: 2009; 17 years ago in Moscow, Russia
- Website: winline.ru

Winline is a Russian sports betting company, established in 2009. As of 2022, Winline was one of the largest bookmakers in the country.

== History ==
The company was founded in 2009 in Moscow. Since 2016, Winline accepted online bets.

== Betting ==
Winline accepts bets via betting shops, website, iOS and Android apps. The users must complete the KYC procedure before betting. The company accepts pre-match bets, live bets, and bets on future events.

== Sponsorships ==
Winline is a sponsor of the Russian Premier League (up to the season 2024/25). and Euroleague (basketball). It's also a sponsor of FC Spartak Moscow, FC Krasnodar, FC Zenit Saint Petersburg, and FC Dinamo Minsk association football clubs, PBC CSKA Moscow and BC UNICS basketball clubs. Winline also sponsors several KHL teams, including Ak Bars Kazan, Traktor Chelyabinsk, Avtomobilist Yekaterinburg, HC Sibir Novosibirsk and HC Barys Astana (Kazakhstan). It's also a sponsor of the Virtus.pro cybersports team.

== Revenue ==
In 2022, Winline had reported revenue of 43.6 billion rubles and a profit of 13.1 billion rubles. By 2017, it was the 4th largest bookmaker in Russia by revenue. In 2020, the company was ranked second on the Forbes list of the fastest-growing companies in Russia.
