= Jögel =

Russian sportswear company

- Industry: Sport; Textile
- Founded: 2015; 11 years ago
- Headquarters: Moscow, Russia
- Area served: Russia
- Products: Sportswear
- Number of employees: 50+
- Website: jogel.pro

Jögel is a Russian sportswear company based in Moscow, dedicated to the production of products for association football, basketball, volleyball, futsal and other sports. They are the current sponsors of the Russia national football team.

== History ==
Old logo

Jögel was founded in 2015. In 2022, Adidas cancelled their sponsorship with the Russia national football team due to the Russian invasion of Ukraine. Jögel's deal with the Russian national team then took effect in 2024 and lasts until 2026. In November they become a partner of Mini-football association in Russia.

== Sponsorship ==
=== Association football (soccer) ===
==== National teams ====
- Russia
- Russia (women)

==== Club teams ====
- (Armenia) FC Alashkert
- (Armenia) Pyunik
- (Belarus) Dynamo Minsk
- (Russia) Akron Tolyatti
- (Russia) Amkal Moscow
- (Russia) Veles Moscow
- (Russia) Dynamo Bryansk
- (Russia) Spartak Moscow
- (Russia) Zenit Saint Petersburg
- (Russia) SKA-Khabarovsk

==== Players ====
- (Russia) Ilya Svinov
- (Russia) Aleksandr Selikhov
- (Russia) Stanislav Agkatsev
- (Russia) Igor Leshchuk
- (Russia) Mikhail Kerzhakov
