= 2024–25 Russian Premier League =

33nd season of top-tier football league in Russia

Russian Premier League
- Season: 2024–25
- Dates: 20 July 2024 – 24 May 2025
- Champions: Krasnodar (1st title)
- Relegated: Fakel Voronezh; Khimki
- Matches: 240
- Goals: 648 (2.7 per match)
- Top goalscorer: Manfred Ugalde (17 goals)
- Biggest home win: Zenit 5–0 Rostov; 3 August 2024; Krasnodar 5–0 Fakel; 30 March 2025; Spartak Moscow 5–0 Khimki; 24 May 2025
- Biggest away win: Akhmat 0–5 Lokomotiv; 4 August 2024; Akron 0–5 Zenit; 18 October 2024
- Highest scoring: Akron 2–5 Krasnodar; 21 September 2024; Khimki 3–4 Dynamo Moscow; 27 October 2024; Spartak 5–2 Lokomotiv; 23 November 2024; Pari NN 5–2 Krylia Sovetov; 12 May 2025
- Longest winning run: 11 matches Krasnodar
- Longest unbeaten run: 16 matches Krasnodar
- Longest winless run: 19 matches Orenburg
- Longest losing run: 8 matches Orenburg
- Highest attendance: 57,101; Zenit 4–1 Krasnodar; 13 April 2025
- Lowest attendance: 1,029; Khimki 0–0 Orenburg; 22 September 2024 (The game between Fakel and Akhmat was held behind closed doors on 5 April 2025 as punishment for misbehavior of Fakel fans)
- Total attendance: 2,905,075
- Average attendance: 12,155

The 2024–25 Russian Premier League (known as the Mir Russian Premier League, also written as Mir Russian Premier Liga for sponsorship reasons) was the 33rd season of the premier football competition in Russia since the dissolution of the Soviet Union and the 23rd under the current Russian Premier League name. FC Krasnodar won the league title, also marking the club’s first trophy in their history.

== Teams ==
As in the previous season, 16 teams play in the 2024–25 season. After the 2023–24 season, Ural Yekaterinburg, Baltika Kaliningrad and Sochi were relegated to the 2024–25 Russian First League after eleven, one and five years respectively. They were replaced by Khimki return to top tier after one year absence, Dynamo Makhachkala and Akron Tolyatti play in top tier for the first time in history this season.

=== Venues ===
| Zenit Saint Petersburg | Spartak Moscow | Rubin Kazan | Rostov |
|---|---|---|---|
| Krestovsky Stadium | Lukoil Arena | Ak Bars Arena | Rostov Arena |
| Capacity: 60,228 | Capacity: 44,929 | Capacity: 42,398 | Capacity: 43,472 |
| Dynamo Makhachkala | Locations of teams in the 2024–25 Russian Premier League Locations of teams in the 2024–25 Russian Premier League in Moscow | | Krylia Sovetov Samara / Akron Tolyatti |
| Anzhi Arena | Locations of teams in the 2024–25 Russian Premier League Locations of teams in the 2024–25 Russian Premier League in Moscow | | Solidarnost Arena |
| Capacity: 24,859 | Locations of teams in the 2024–25 Russian Premier League Locations of teams in the 2024–25 Russian Premier League in Moscow | | Capacity: 42,347 |
| Krasnodar | Locations of teams in the 2024–25 Russian Premier League Locations of teams in the 2024–25 Russian Premier League in Moscow | | Akhmat Grozny |
| Krasnodar Stadium | Locations of teams in the 2024–25 Russian Premier League Locations of teams in the 2024–25 Russian Premier League in Moscow | | Akhmat-Arena |
| Capacity: 35,179 | Locations of teams in the 2024–25 Russian Premier League Locations of teams in the 2024–25 Russian Premier League in Moscow | | Capacity: 30,597 |
| CSKA Moscow | Locations of teams in the 2024–25 Russian Premier League Locations of teams in the 2024–25 Russian Premier League in Moscow | | Lokomotiv Moscow |
| VEB Arena | Locations of teams in the 2024–25 Russian Premier League Locations of teams in the 2024–25 Russian Premier League in Moscow | | RZD Arena |
| Capacity: 30,114 | Locations of teams in the 2024–25 Russian Premier League Locations of teams in the 2024–25 Russian Premier League in Moscow | | Capacity: 27,032 |
| Khimki | Locations of teams in the 2024–25 Russian Premier League Locations of teams in the 2024–25 Russian Premier League in Moscow | | Pari Nizhny Novgorod |
| Arena Khimki | Locations of teams in the 2024–25 Russian Premier League Locations of teams in the 2024–25 Russian Premier League in Moscow | | Nizhny Novgorod Stadium |
| Capacity: 18,636 | Locations of teams in the 2024–25 Russian Premier League Locations of teams in the 2024–25 Russian Premier League in Moscow | | Capacity: 44,242 |
| Fakel Voronezh | | Dynamo Moscow | Orenburg |
| Fakel Stadium | | VTB Arena | Gazovik Stadium |
| Capacity: 10,052 | | Capacity: 25,716 | Capacity: 10,046 |

=== Personnel and kits ===
| Team | Location | Head coach | Captain | Kit manufacturer | Shirt sponsor(s) | |
| Team | Location | Head coach | Captain | Kit manufacturer | Main | Other |
|---|---|---|---|---|---|---|
| Akhmat | Grozny | (Russia) Fyodor Shcherbachenko (caretaker) | (Russia) Rizvan Utsiyev | (Spain) Joma | Akhmat Foundation | List: Front: Pari; Back: None; Sleeves: None; Shorts: Pari |
| Akron | Tolyatti | (Russia) Zaur Tedeyev | (Russia) Konstantin Savichev | (Russia) Jögel | Fonbet | List: Front: Novostal-M, Lada; Back: Electroshield Samara; Sleeves: None; Shorts: Zavod Invertor |
| CSKA | Moscow | (Serbia) Marko Nikolić | (Russia) Igor Akinfeev | CSKA (self-branded) | Apotheka | List: Front: Fonbet, Promsvyazbank; Back: VEB.RF, Aeroflot, Rosseti; Sleeves: Fonbet; Shorts: VEB.RF, Rosseti |
| Dynamo Makhachkala | Makhachkala | (Russia) Khasanbi Bidzhiyev | (Russia) Mutalip Alibekov | (Spain) Joma | Magnit | List: Front: BETCITY, Chistoe Serdtse, Immidstroy; Back: BETCITY, Cen Geo; Sleeves: Water Mever; Shorts: BETCITY |
| Dynamo Moscow | Moscow | (Russia) Rolan Gusev (caretaker) | (Paraguay) Fabián Balbuena | (Germany) Puma | BetBoom | List: Front: VTB Bank, Wildberries, Changan; Back: Rossiya Airlines, Dixy; Sleeves: None; Shorts: BetBoom, VTB Bank |
| Fakel | Voronezh | (Russia) Igor Shalimov | (Russia) Irakli Kvekveskiri | (Russia) Demix | EkoNiva | List: Front: MelBet, TNS Energo Voronezh; Back: Mezhregiontruboprovodstroy; Sleeves: TechnoResource International; Shorts: MelBet |
| Khimki | Khimki | (Russia) Magomed Adiyev | (Russia) Anton Zabolotny | (Germany) Puma | None | List: Front: None; Back: Khotkovsky Avtomost; Sleeves: Khimki; Shorts: Vorgol |
| Krasnodar | Krasnodar | (Russia) Murad Musayev | (Armenia) Eduard Spertsyan | Krasnodar (self-branded) | Winline | List: Front: None; Back: GK TOCHNO; Sleeves: Constell Group; Shorts: None |
| Krylia Sovetov | Samara | Vacant | (Russia) Aleksandr Soldatenkov | (Germany) Puma | Fonbet | List: Front: None; Back: Solidarnost Bank, Samara Oblast, Apotheka; Sleeves: Wildberries, Fonbet; Shorts: Fonbet |
| Lokomotiv | Moscow | (Russia) Mikhail Galaktionov | (Russia) Dmitri Barinov | Lokomotiv (self-branded) | Russian Railways | List: Front: BetBoom, SWM (A & T); Back: BetBoom, Russian Railways, Sapsan; Sleeves: SWM (H); Shorts: Federal Freight |
| Orenburg | Orenburg | (Bosnia and Herzegovina) Vladimir Slišković | (Russia) Andrei Malykh | (Germany) Adidas | EcoGas | List: Front: Leon Bet; Back: Leon Bet, Gazprom Dobycha Orenburg; Sleeves: Orenburg Oblast; Shorts: Gazprom Dobycha Orenburg |
| Pari | Nizhny Novgorod | (Belarus) Viktor Goncharenko | (Russia) Kirill Gotsuk | (Germany) Jako | Pari | List: Front: Nizhny Novgorod Oblast, GloraX; Back: GloraX; Sleeves: Nizhegorodets Motors; Shorts: Pari |
| Rostov | Rostov-on-Don | (Spain) Jonatan Alba | (Russia) Nikolay Komlichenko | (Germany) Puma | TNS Energo Rostov-on-Don | List: Front: Samolet Group, Fonbet; Back: Novoshakhtinsk Zavod Neft Produktov, Rostselmash; Sleeves: Fonbet; Shorts: Fonbet, Novoshakhtinsk Zavod Neft Produktov |
| Rubin | Kazan | (Tajikistan) Rashid Rakhimov | (Montenegro) Igor Vujačić | Rubin (self-branded) | Kazanorgsintez | List: Front: Nizhnekamskneftekhim, Fonbet, Ingosstrakh; Back: Kazanorgsintez; Sleeves: Kazanorgsintez; Shorts: Fonbet, Kazanorgsintez |
| Spartak | Moscow | (Serbia) Dejan Stanković | (Russia) Roman Zobnin | (Russia) Jögel | Lukoil | List: Front: Winline, Chery, Ecto 100, BQ Russia; Back: Wildberries, Winline, Plastikovyye okna Melke; Sleeves: Alfa-Bank; Shorts: Lukoil Genesis, Lukoil Licard, Komus, Plastikovyye okna Melke |
| Zenit | Saint Petersburg | (Russia) Sergei Semak | (Brazil) Douglas Santos | (Spain) Kelme | Gazprom | List: Front: Winline, MegaFon; Back: Rossiya Airlines, G-Drive; Sleeves: Wildberries, Gazprombank, Winline; Shorts: G-Energy |

=== Managerial changes ===
| Team | Outgoing manager | Manner of departure | Date of vacancy | Position in table | Replaced by | Date of appointment |
|---|---|---|---|---|---|---|
| Spartak Moscow | (Bosnia and Herzegovina) Vladimir Slišković (caretaker) | End of caretaking spell | 16 May 2024 | Pre-season | (Serbia) Dejan Stanković | 16 May 2024 |
| CSKA Moscow | (Russia) Vladimir Fedotov | Sacked | 3 June 2024 | Pre-season | (Serbia) Marko Nikolić | 6 June 2024 |
| Khimki | (Russia) Andrey Talalayev | Sacked | 20 June 2024 | Pre-season | (Spain) Franc Artiga | 28 June 2024 |
| Fakel Voronezh | (Tajikistan) Igor Cherevchenko | Mutual consent | 12 August 2024 | 16th | (Russia) Dmitri Pyatibratov | 13 August 2024 |
| Akhmat Grozny | (Russia) Magomed Adiyev | Mutual consent | 1 September 2024 | 15th | (Russia) Sergei Tashuyev | 3 September 2024 |
| Orenburg | (Spain) David Deogracia | Sacked | 3 October 2024 | 14th | (Russia) Ilshat Aitkulov (caretaker) | 3 October 2024 |
| Pari | (Serbia) Saša Ilić | Mutual consent | 5 October 2024 | 11th | (Belarus) Viktor Goncharenko | 9 October 2024 |
| Orenburg | (Russia) Ilshat Aitkulov (caretaker) | End of caretaking spell | 7 October 2024 | 15th | (Bosnia and Herzegovina) Vladimir Slišković | 7 October 2024 |
| Rostov | (Russia) Valery Karpin | Resigned | 25 February 2025 | 7th | (Spain) Jonatan Alba | 25 February 2025 |
| Fakel Voronezh | (Russia) Dmitri Pyatibratov | Resigned | 30 March 2025 | 15th | (Russia) Igor Shalimov | 2 April 2025 |
| Khimki | (Spain) Franc Artiga | Mutual consent | 15 April 2025 | 12th | (Russia) Magomed Adiyev | 16 April 2025 |
| Dynamo Moscow | (Czech Republic) Marcel Lička | Resigned | 1 May 2025 | 5th | (Russia) Rolan Gusev (caretaker) | 1 May 2025 |
| Krylia Sovetov Samara | (Russia) Igor Osinkin | Mutual consent | 27 May 2025 | Post-season | | |
| Akhmat Grozny | (Russia) Sergei Tashuyev | Resigned | 28 May 2025 | Relegation play-offs | (Russia) Fyodor Shcherbachenko (caretaker) | 28 May 2025 |

== Tournament format and regulations ==
The 16 teams play a round-robin tournament whereby each team plays each one of the other teams twice, once at home and once away, for a total of 240 matches with each team playing 30.

The season started on 21 July. The last games before the winter break were played on 10 December; the spring part of the season began on 1 March and the last games will be played on 25 May.

=== Promotion and relegation ===
For the purpose of determining First League positions for the following considerations, the teams that do not pass 2025–26 RPL licensing or drop out of 2025–26 season for any other reason, or the second teams of RPL clubs, or the teams that finished lower than 6th place in First League standings will not be considered. For example, if the teams that finished 1st, 3rd and 4th in the First League standings failed licensing, the team that finished 2nd would be considered the 1st-placed team, the team that finished 5th will be considered the 2nd-placed team, and the team that finished 6th will be considered the 3rd-placed team. There would be no designated 4th-placed team in this scenario.

The teams that finish 15th and 16th will be relegated to the 2025–26 First League, while the top two in that league will be promoted to the Premier League for the 2025–26 season.

The 13th and 14th Premier League teams will play the 4th and 3rd 2024–25 First League teams respectively in two (home-and-away) playoff games, with penalty shootout in effect if necessary. The winners will secure Premier League spots for the 2025–26 season. If both of the teams that finish RPL in 13th and 14th place fail licensing for the 2025–26 season or drop out for any other reason, play-offs will not be held, and the 3rd and 4th First League teams will be promoted automatically. If one of the teams that place 13th and 14th in the Premier League fails licensing for 2025–26 season or drops out for other reasons, 3rd First League team will be promoted automatically and the 13th or 14th-placed team that passes licensing will play 4th First League team in playoffs, with the winners securing the Premier League spot. If only one First League team is eligible for the play-offs (as in the example scenario above), that team will play the 14th-placed RPL team in playoffs, with the winners securing the Premier League spot, and the 13th RPL team will remain in the league. If none of the First League teams are eligible for the play-offs, they will not be held and 13th and 14th-placed RPL teams will remain in the league. If any of the teams are unable to participate in the season after the play-offs have been concluded, or there are not enough teams that pass licensing to follow the above procedures, the replacement will be chosen by the Russian Football Union in consultation with RPL and FNL.

On 24 May 2025, Russian Football Union announced that Khimki (12th in the RPL), Chernomorets Novorossiysk (3rd in the First League) and SKA-Khabarovsk (6th in the First League) were not issued a Premier League license for next season. Therefore 4th-placed First League team (Ural Yekaterinburg) played Akhmat and 5th-placed First League team (Sochi) played Pari NN in the RPL play-offs.

As Khimki finished the season outside of relegation zone, they would be replaced following the play-offs, according to the RPL regulations, priority for replacement was the highest-placed 2024–25 RPL team which did not otherwise qualify for 2025–26 RPL. Therefore, if both Akhmat and Pari won in the play-offs, Orenburg would have remained in the league to replace Khimki. If Pari won and Akhmat lost, Akhmat would have remained in the league to replace Khimki. Pari lost their matchup, and they were widely expected to remain in the league to replace Khimki. On 3 June 2025, the league recommended that Pari is kept in the league, as per the vote by most of the league clubs, with the final decision to be made by the Russian Football Union. On 4 June 2025, majority of the First League clubs also voted for keeping Pari in the Premier League. On 16 June 2025, Russian Football Union confirmed that Pari will remain in the league.

=== Exclusion from the league ===
Any team can be excluded from the Premier League during the season for the following reasons: a) using counterfeit documents or providing inaccurate information to the league; b) not arriving to the game on more than one occasion; c) match fixing. Such a team is automatically relegated and is not replaced during the season, and only one additional team (that gains the least amount of points at the end of the season) is directly relegated. If the excluded team had played fewer than 15 games at the time of exclusion, all its results would be annulled and would not count for the standings. If the excluded team had played at least 15 games at the time of exclusion, all their remaining opponents would be awarded a victory without effect on their goal difference.

== Season events ==
=== Last match day ===
For the second consecutive season, the champion was determined on the last matchday on 24 May 2025, with all the games played simultaneously with common kick-off time of 16:30 Moscow Time. Krasnodar entered the day with 64 points, and the defending champions Zenit St. Petersburg with 63. Krasnodar hosted Dynamo Moscow and Zenit hosted Akhmat Grozny. Krasnodar defeated Dynamo on the last day of the previous season, preventing Dynamo from winning the title. Head-to-head results are the first tiebreaker in case the teams are tied on points. Zenit had head-to-head advantage over Krasnodar after beating them with the score of 4–1 at home and losing 0–2 away. Krasnodar would win the title if they defeated Dynamo, or if they tied against Dynamo and Zenit did not beat Akhmat, or if Krasnodar and Zenit both lost their respective games. Zenit would win the title in all other scenarios. Krasnodar defeated Dynamo with the score of 3–0 and won the title.

== League table ==
| Pos | Team | Pld | W | D | L | GF | GA | GD | Pts | Qualification or relegation |
|---|---|---|---|---|---|---|---|---|---|---|
| 1 | Krasnodar (C) | 30 | 20 | 7 | 3 | 59 | 23 | +36 | 67 | |
| 2 | Zenit Saint Petersburg | 30 | 20 | 6 | 4 | 58 | 18 | +40 | 66 | |
| 3 | CSKA Moscow | 30 | 17 | 8 | 5 | 47 | 21 | +26 | 59 | |
| 4 | Spartak Moscow | 30 | 17 | 6 | 7 | 56 | 25 | +31 | 57 | |
| 5 | Dynamo Moscow | 30 | 16 | 8 | 6 | 61 | 35 | +26 | 56 | |
| 6 | Lokomotiv Moscow | 30 | 15 | 8 | 7 | 51 | 41 | +10 | 53 | |
| 7 | Rubin Kazan | 30 | 13 | 6 | 11 | 42 | 45 | −3 | 45 | |
| 8 | Rostov | 30 | 10 | 9 | 11 | 41 | 43 | −2 | 39 | |
| 9 | Akron Tolyatti | 30 | 10 | 5 | 15 | 39 | 55 | −16 | 35 | |
| 10 | Krylia Sovetov Samara | 30 | 8 | 7 | 15 | 36 | 51 | −15 | 31 | |
| 11 | Dynamo Makhachkala | 30 | 6 | 11 | 13 | 27 | 35 | −8 | 29 (Note: Dynamo Makhachkala 4–1 Khimki, Khimki 1–1 Dynamo Makhachkala) | |
| 12 | Khimki (D, R) | 30 | 6 | 11 | 13 | 35 | 56 | −21 | 29 | Administratively relegated, then dissolved. (Note: Khimki were not issued the 2025–26 RPL license and were administratively relegated. They were replaced by Pari Nizhny Novgorod. Khimki were then dissolved.) |
| 13 | Pari Nizhny Novgorod (X) | 30 | 7 | 6 | 17 | 27 | 54 | −27 | 27 | Qualification to relegation play-offs |
| 14 | Akhmat Grozny (O) | 30 | 4 | 13 | 13 | 27 | 48 | −21 | 25 | Qualification to relegation play-offs |
| 15 | Orenburg (Note: Orenburg was originally relegated, then returned to Russian Premier League on 11 July 2025 to replace Torpedo Moscow which was originally promoted and then removed from the league for attempted match-fixing in the previous season.) | 30 | 4 | 7 | 19 | 28 | 56 | −28 | 19 | |
| 16 | Fakel Voronezh (R) | 30 | 2 | 12 | 16 | 14 | 42 | −28 | 18 | Relegation to First League |

Source: Premier Liga
Rules for classification: 1) Points; 2) Head-to-head points; 3) Head-to-head matches won; 4) Head-to-head goal difference; 5) Head-to-head goals scored; 6) Matches won; 7) Goal difference; 8) Goals scored; 9) 2023–24 position (not applicable to final standings); 10) Play-off. Note: if teams tied on points did not play an equal number of head-to-head games, head-to-head results are not considered for the standings.
(C) Champions; (D) Disqualified; (O) Play-off winners; (R) Relegated; (X) Lost in the play-offs, reprieved from relegation after Khimki was administratively relegated.

== Relegation play-offs ==
The draw to determine the hosts in each leg was held on 14 May 2025. Third-placed First League club Chernomorets Novorossiysk was not issued the RPL license and was replaced in the play-offs by fifth-placed Sochi. As Khimki, which finished 12th in the RPL, was also not issued a license, it would be replaced by the highest-placed RPL team that did not otherwise qualify for the 2025–26 RPL.

=== First leg ===
28 May 2025
19:30

| Sochi | 1–2 | Pari Nizhny Novgorod |
|---|---|---|
| Pasevich 14'; Pisarsky (red card) 35'; Nacho (yellow card) 42'; Aberdin (yellow card) 57' | Report | Ektov (yellow card) 42'; Troshechkin 45+4'; Aleksandrov 88' (yellow card) 90' |

Fisht Olympic Stadium, Sochi
Attendance: 4,508
Referee: Sergei Karasev

28 May 2025
17:00 (19:00 YEKT)

| Ural Yekaterinburg | 2–1 | Akhmat Grozny |
|---|---|---|
| Yegorychev (yellow card) 15'; Sungatulin (yellow card) 25'; Sekulić 50' (pen.), 59'; Begić (yellow card) 65' | Report | Todorović (yellow card) 16'; Melkadze 21' |

Yekaterinburg Arena, Yekaterinburg
Attendance: 19,679
Referee: Kirill Levnikov

=== Second leg ===
31 May 2025
17:00

| Pari Nizhny Novgorod | 1–3 | Sochi |
|---|---|---|
| Tsarukyan (yellow card) 49'; Castillo (yellow card) 80'; Boselli 84' (pen.) | Report | Zaika 21' (yellow card) 47'; Aberdin (yellow card) 29'; Kramarič 45+4' (pen.), 45+6' |

Nizhny Novgorod Stadium, Nizhny Novgorod
Attendance: 13,680
Referee: Artyom Chistyakov

Sochi won 4–3 on aggregate and was promoted to the Russian Premier League, Pari Nizhny Novgorod remained in the league as replacement for FC Khimki.

31 May 2025
19:30

| Akhmat Grozny | 2–0 | Ural Yekaterinburg |
|---|---|---|
| Adamov (yellow card) 38'; Sadulayev (yellow card) 41'; Melkadze 51' (pen.) (yellow card) 56'; Zorin 90+2' | Report | Begić (yellow card) 49'; Ayupov (yellow card) 56'; Malkevich (yellow card) 73'; Zheleznov (yellow card) 83' |

Akhmat-Arena, Grozny
Attendance: 4,600
Referee: Sergey Ivanov

Akhmat won 3–2 on aggregate and remained in the Russian Premier League, Ural remained in the Russian First League.

== Results ==
| Home \ Away | AKH | AKR | CSK | DMA | DMO | FAK | KHI | KRA | KRY | LOK | ORE | PNN | ROS | RUB | SPA | ZEN |
|---|---|---|---|---|---|---|---|---|---|---|---|---|---|---|---|---|
| Akhmat Grozny | — | 0–0 | 1–1 | 1–1 | 1–1 | 2–3 | 3–3 | 1–1 | 1–1 | 0–5 | 1–0 | 0–2 | 2–1 | 2–1 | 0–0 | 1–2 |
| Akron Tolyatti | 3–2 | — | 1–2 | 1–0 | 0–2 | 1–0 | 3–0 | 2–5 | 2–0 | 1–4 | 1–0 | 2–2 | 2–3 | 1–2 | 2–3 | 0–5 |
| CSKA Moscow | 3–0 | 4–0 | — | 2–0 | 3–1 | 0–0 | 1–0 | 1–0 | 1–1 | 0–1 | 5–1 | 2–0 | 1–2 | 2–2 | 0–2 | 0–1 |
| Dynamo Makhachkala | 1–0 | 1–1 | 0–1 | — | 0–1 | 0–0 | 4–1 | 2–3 | 4–0 | 1–1 | 2–1 | 0–1 | 1–1 | 2–3 | 1–1 | 0–1 |
| Dynamo Moscow | 4–2 | 2–1 | 1–2 | 4–0 | — | 3–1 | 4–1 | 0–1 | 1–0 | 3–1 | 5–1 | 3–1 | 1–1 | 3–1 | 2–0 | 1–1 |
| Fakel Voronezh | 0–0 | 0–2 | 0–1 | 1–1 | 1–1 | — | 1–1 | 0–0 | 1–1 | 0–1 | 1–0 | 0–0 | 0–2 | 0–0 | 0–0 | 0–2 |
| Khimki | 1–1 | 2–2 | 0–2 | 1–1 | 3–4 | 1–0 | — | 2–2 | 1–3 | 2–0 | 0–0 | 2–0 | 1–1 | 3–2 | 1–3 | 1–1 |
| Krasnodar | 3–1 | 1–0 | 2–1 | 0–0 | 3–0 | 5–0 | 4–0 | — | 1–1 | 0–0 | 4–0 | 2–1 | 2–0 | 2–1 | 0–3 | 2–0 |
| Krylia Sovetov Samara | 2–1 | 0–2 | 1–2 | 0–1 | 1–3 | 2–0 | 0–0 | 1–2 | — | 5–1 | 2–0 | 3–1 | 1–3 | 1–1 | 0–2 | 0–4 |
| Lokomotiv Moscow | 1–1 | 3–2 | 2–2 | 2–0 | 2–1 | 2–1 | 1–3 | 0–3 | 1–0 | — | 1–1 | 3–0 | 3–2 | 1–0 | 3–1 | 1–1 |
| Orenburg | 0–0 | 2–2 | 0–2 | 2–1 | 2–2 | 1–0 | 1–1 | 1–2 | 2–2 | 2–4 | — | 1–2 | 1–2 | 1–2 | 2–0 | 0–1 |
| Pari Nizhny Novgorod | 1–0 | 2–1 | 0–3 | 0–0 | 1–1 | 1–1 | 1–0 | 0–3 | 5–2 | 1–3 | 1–2 | — | 1–1 | 2–4 | 0–2 | 0–3 |
| Rostov | 2–3 | 0–2 | 0–0 | 0–0 | 1–1 | 4–1 | 3–1 | 0–1 | 3–1 | 1–1 | 3–2 | 4–0 | — | 1–1 | 0–3 | 0–1 |
| Rubin Kazan | 2–0 | 3–0 | 1–1 | 2–0 | 0–4 | 2–1 | 2–3 | 1–1 | 0–2 | 1–0 | 4–2 | 1–0 | 1–0 | — | 2–1 | 0–4 |
| Spartak Moscow | 0–0 | 4–0 | 1–2 | 1–2 | 2–2 | 3–0 | 5–0 | 0–3 | 3–0 | 5–2 | 2–0 | 3–0 | 3–0 | 1–0 | — | 2–1 |
| Zenit Saint Petersburg | 3–0 | 1–2 | 0–0 | 2–1 | 1–0 | 3–1 | 1–0 | 4–1 | 2–3 | 1–1 | 1–0 | 2–1 | 5–0 | 4–0 | 0–0 | — |

Source: Russian Premier League
Legend: Blue = home team win; Yellow = draw; Red = away team win.
For upcoming matches, an "a" indicates there is an article about the rivalry between the two participants.

== Season statistics ==
=== Top goalscorers ===
| Rank | Player | Club | Goals |
|---|---|---|---|
| 1 | (Costa Rica) Manfred Ugalde | Spartak Moscow | 17 |
| 2 | (Albania) Mirlind Daku | Rubin Kazan | 15 |
| 3 | (Russia) Aleksey Batrakov | Lokomotiv Moscow | 14 |
| 4 | (Colombia) Jhon Córdoba | Krasnodar | 12 |
| 4 | (Russia) Dmitry Vorobyov | Lokomotiv Moscow | 12 |
| 4 | (Argentina) Esequiel Barco | Spartak Moscow | 12 |
| 7 | (Armenia) Eduard Spertsyan | Krasnodar | 11 |
| 8 | (Argentina) Luciano Gondou | Zenit St. Petersburg | 10 |
| 8 | (Russia) Yaroslav Gladyshev | Dynamo Moscow | 10 |
| 8 | (Uruguay) Juan Manuel Boselli | Pari Nizhny Novgorod | 10 |

=== Hat-tricks ===
| Player | For | Against | Result | Date | Ref |
|---|---|---|---|---|---|
| (Russia) Maksim Glushenkov | Zenit St. Petersburg | Rostov | 5–0 (H) | 3 August 2024 | |
| (Costa Rica) Manfred Ugalde^{4} | Spartak Moscow | Lokomotiv Moscow | 5–2 (H) | 23 November 2024 | |
| (Uruguay) Juan Manuel Boselli^{4} | Pari Nizhny Novgorod | Krylia Sovetov Samara | 5–2 (H) | 12 May 2025 | |

- ^{4} Player scored 4 goals

=== Clean sheets ===
| Rank | Player | Club | Clean sheets |
|---|---|---|---|
| 1 | (Russia) Yevgeni Latyshonok | Zenit St. Petersburg | 16 |
| 2 | (Russia) Stanislav Agkatsev | Krasnodar | 15 |
| 2 | (Russia) Aleksandr Maksimenko | Spartak Moscow | 15 |
| 4 | (Russia) Igor Akinfeev | CSKA Moscow | 12 |
| 5 | (Russia) Yevgeni Staver | Rubin Kazan | 7 |
| 5 | (Russia) Aleksandr Vasyutin | Akron Tolyatti | 7 |
| 7 | (Russia) Nikita Medvedev | Pari Nizhny Novgorod | 6 |
| 7 | (Russia) David Volk | Dynamo Makhachkala | 6 |
| 9 | (Russia) Vitali Gudiyev | Fakel Voronezh | 5 |
| 9 | (Russia) Nikita Kokarev | Khimki | 5 |
| 9 | (Russia) Ilya Lantratov | Lokomotiv Moscow | 5 |
| 9 | (Russia) Andrey Lunyov | Dynamo Moscow | 5 |
| 9 | (Russia) Giorgi Sheliya | Akhmat Grozny | 5 |

Notes

- Sergei Pesyakov and Ivan Lomayev each played a half in Krylia Sovetov's 2–0 win over Rubin Kazan on 13 September 2024.
- Aleksandr Vasyutin was substituted by Sergey Volkov in the second half of Akron's 2–0 win over Rostov on 28 September 2024.
- Aleksandr Vasyutin was substituted by Sergey Volkov in the second half of Akron's 2–0 win over Krylia Sovetov on 9 March 2025.
- Rustam Yatimov was substituted by Daniil Odoyevsky in the second half of Rostov's 2–0 win over Fakel on 20 April 2025.
- Ilya Pomazun was substituted by Aleksandr Dovbnya in the second half of Spartak's 2–0 win over Krylia Sovetov on 18 May 2025.

== Awards ==
=== Monthly awards ===
| Month | Player of the Month | | Manager of the Month | | Goal of the Month | | Ref. |
| Month | Player | Club | Manager | Club | Player | Club | Ref. |
|---|---|---|---|---|---|---|---|
| July/August | (Russia) Maksim Glushenkov | Zenit | (Russia) Sergei Semak | Zenit | (Russia) Maksim Glushenkov | Zenit | |
| September | (Russia) Aleksey Batrakov | Lokomotiv | (Russia) Murad Musayev | Krasnodar | (Russia) Konstantin Tyukavin | Dynamo Moscow | |
| October | (Colombia) Jhon Córdoba | Krasnodar | (Russia) Murad Musayev | Krasnodar | (Colombia) Jhon Córdoba | Krasnodar | |
| November/December | (Costa Rica) Manfred Ugalde | Spartak | (Serbia) Dejan Stanković | Spartak | (Kazakhstan) Maksim Samorodov | Akhmat | |
| March | (Russia) Igor Akinfeev | CSKA | (Serbia) Marko Nikolić | CSKA | (Russia) Ivan Sergeyev | Krylia Sovetov | |
| April | (Russia) Yaroslav Gladyshev | Dynamo Moscow | (Serbia) Marko Nikolić | CSKA | (Portugal) Rodrigo Escoval | Akron Tolyatti | |

==== Annual awards ====
Annual awards
| Award | Player | Club |
|---|---|---|
| Player of the Season | (Colombia) Jhon Córdoba | Krasnodar |
| Goalkeeper of the Season | (Russia) Stanislav Agkatsev | Krasnodar |
| Defender of the Season | (Brazil) Moisés | CSKA Moscow |
| Midfielder of the Season | (Armenia) Eduard Spertsyan | Krasnodar |
| Forward of the Season | (Colombia) Jhon Córdoba | Krasnodar |
| Coach of the Season | (Russia) Murad Musaev | Krasnodar |
| Young Player of the Season | (Russia) Aleksei Batrakov | Lokomotiv Moscow |

Team of the Year
| Goalkeeper | (Russia) Igor Akinfeev (CSKA Moscow) | | | |
| Defenders | (Brazil) Gustavo Mantuan (Zenit Saint Petersburg) | (Russia) Igor Diveev (CSKA Moscow) | (Russia) Maksim Osipenko (Rostov) | (Brazil) Moisés (CSKA Moscow) |
| Midfielders | (Russia) Yaroslav Gladyshev (Dynamo Moscow) | | (Colombia) Wilmar Barrios (Zenit Saint Petersburg) | (Russia) Aleksei Batrakov (Lokomotiv Moscow) |
| Forwards | (Brazil) Marquinhos (Spartak Moscow) | | (Armenia) Eduard Spertsyan (Krasnodar) | (Colombia) Jhon Córdoba (Krasnodar) |

== Attendances ==
FC Zenit drew the highest average home attendance in the 2024-25 edition of the Russian Premier League.

| # | Football club | Home games | Average attendance |
|---|---|---|---|
| 1 | FC Zenit | 15 | 35,691 |
| 2 | FC Krasnodar | 15 | 27,561 |
| 3 | FC Spartak Moscow | 15 | 19,979 |
| 4 | FC Rostov | 15 | 14,381 |
| 5 | FC Dynamo Moscow | 15 | 13,179 |
| 6 | PFC CSKA Moscow | 15 | 12,238 |
| 7 | FC Lokomotiv Moscow | 15 | 10,466 |
| 8 | Krylia Sovetov | 15 | 10,353 |
| 9 | Rubin Kazan | 15 | 9,530 |
| 10 | FC Nizhny Novgorod | 15 | 9,218 |
| 11 | Fakel Voronezh | 15 | 7,984 |
| 12 | Dynamo Makhachkala | 15 | 7,029 |
| 13 | Akron Tolyatti | 15 | 4,655 |
| 14 | FC Orenburg | 15 | 4,520 |
| 15 | Akhmat Grozny | 15 | 4,449 |
| 16 | FC Khimki | 15 | 2,432 |
