= Economy of Kazan =

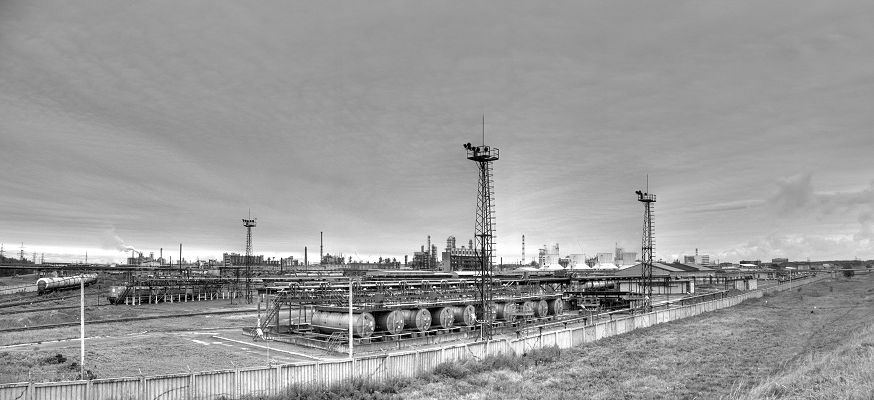
Kazanorgsintez chemical plant

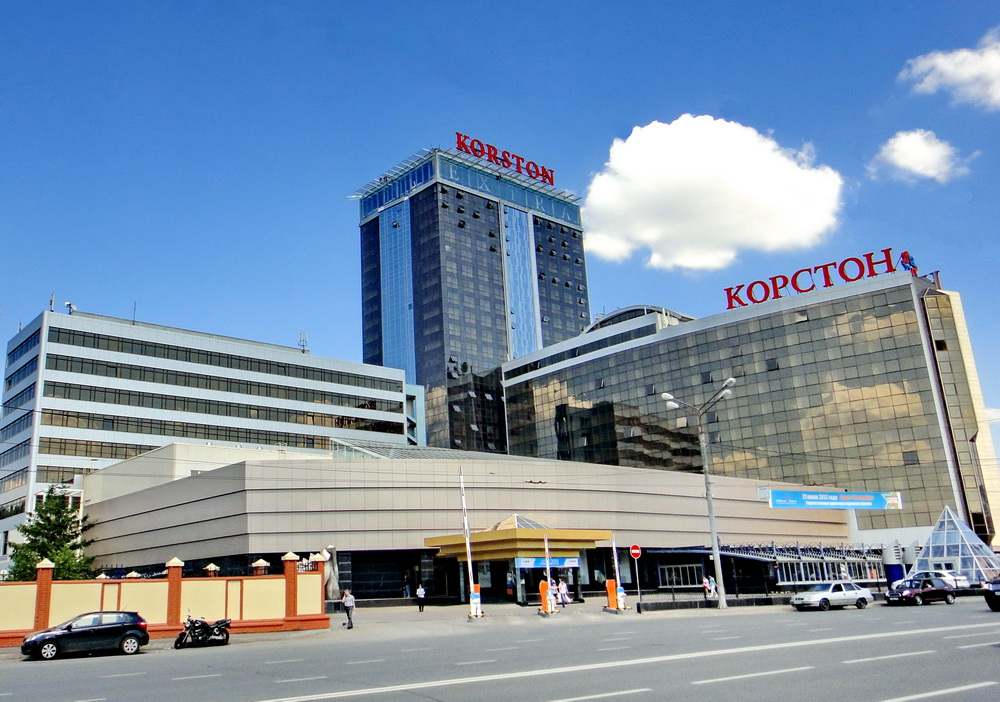
Korston-Kazan with local World Trade Center

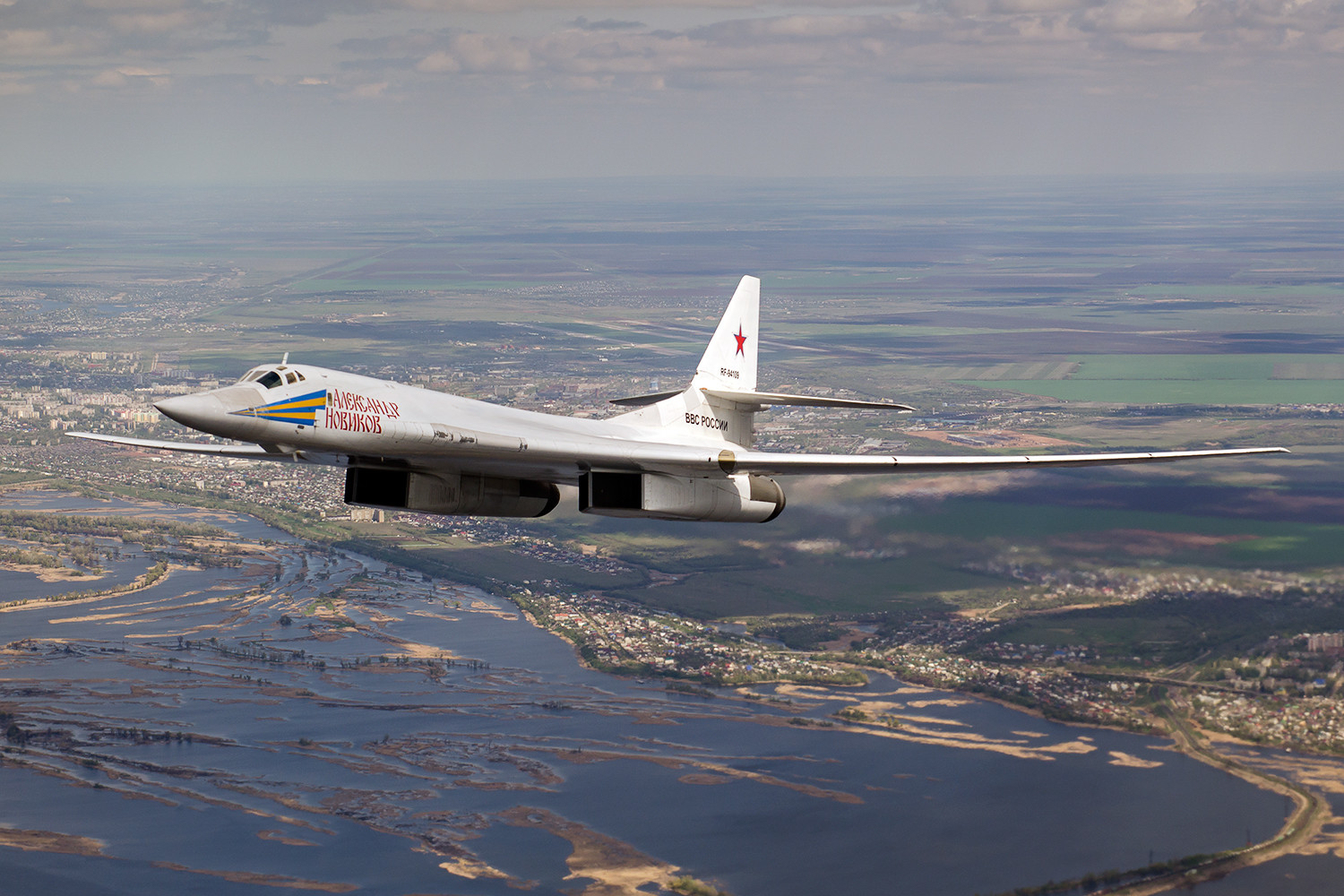
Tupolev Tu-160 strategic bomber built by Kazan Aircraft Production Association

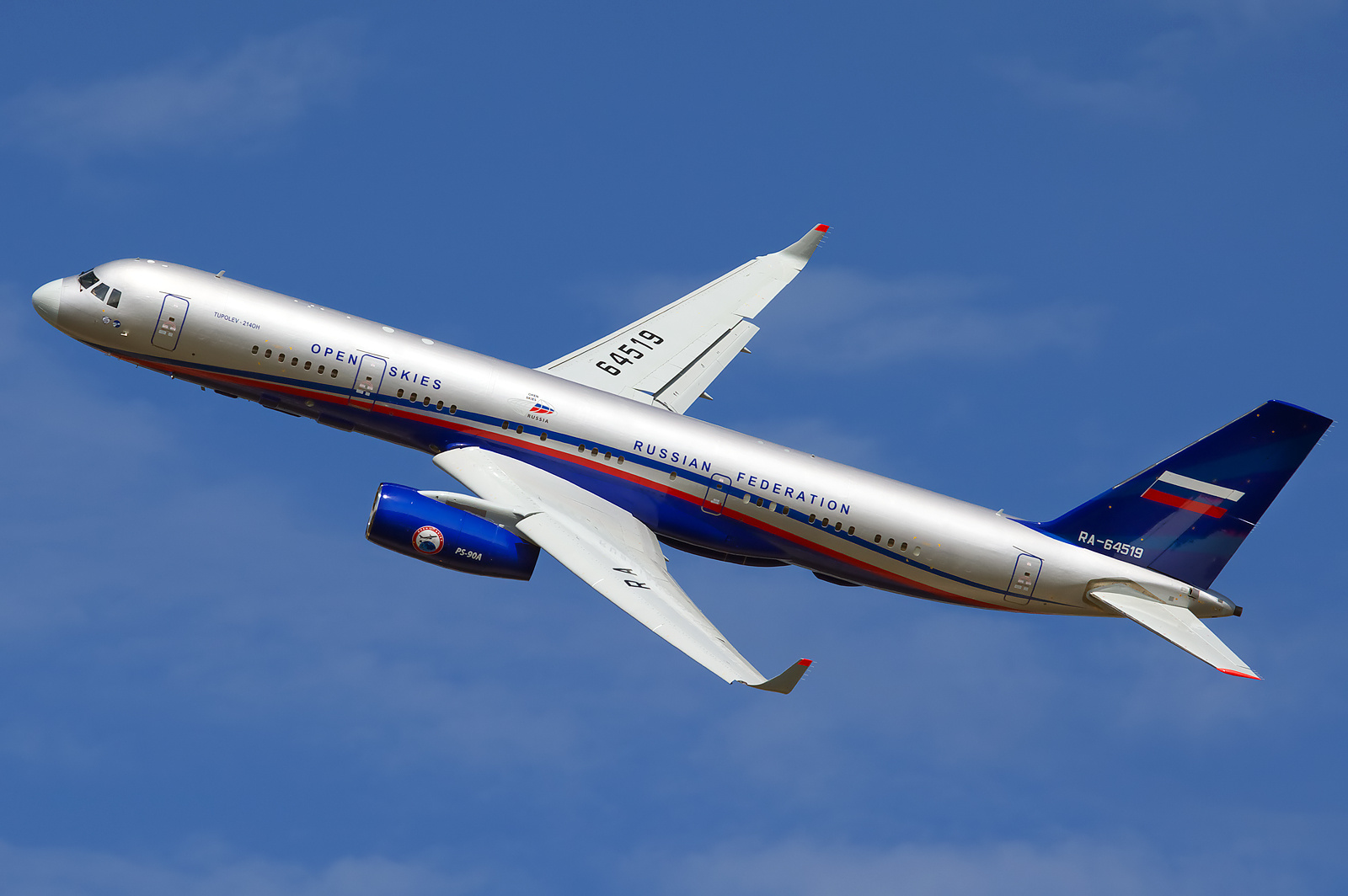
Tupolev Tu-204 airliner built by Kazan Aircraft Production Association

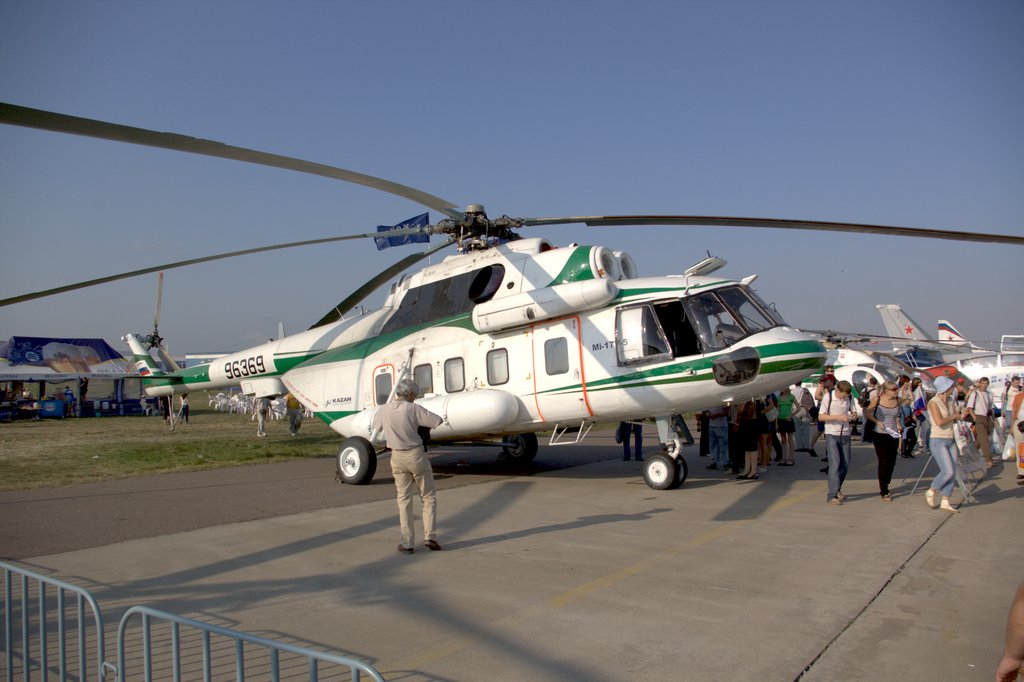
Mil Mi-17 middle helicopter built by Kazan Helicopters

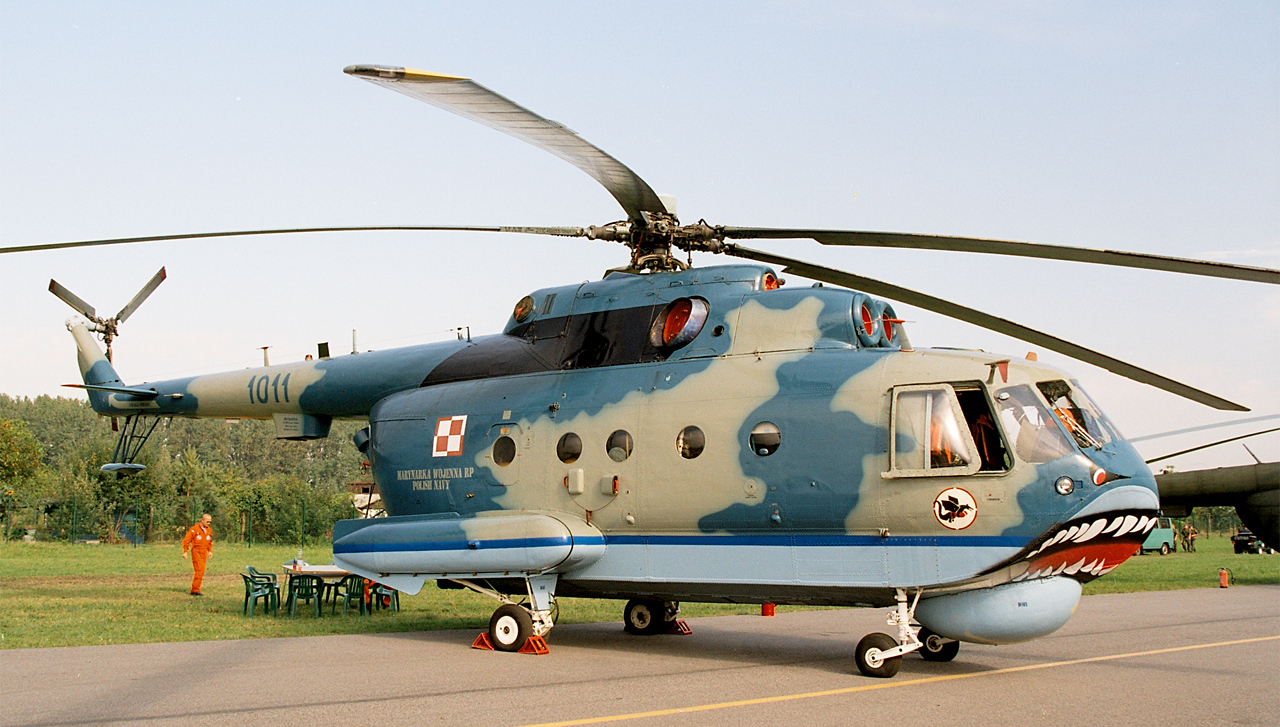
Mil Mi-14 amphibious helicopter built by Kazan Helicopters

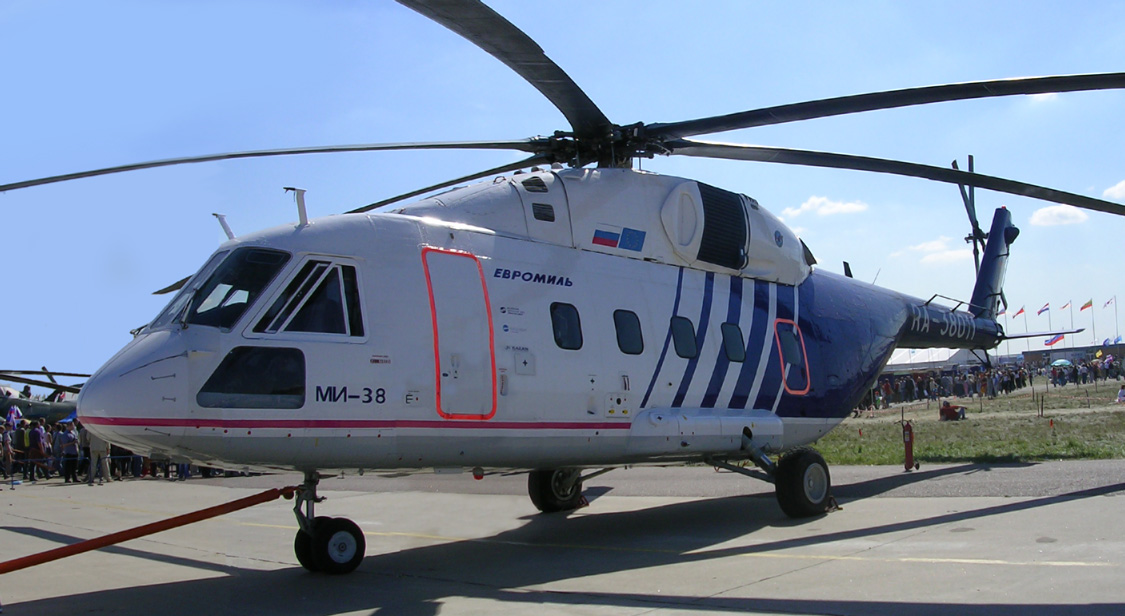
Mil Mi-38 intermediate helicopter built by Kazan Helicopters

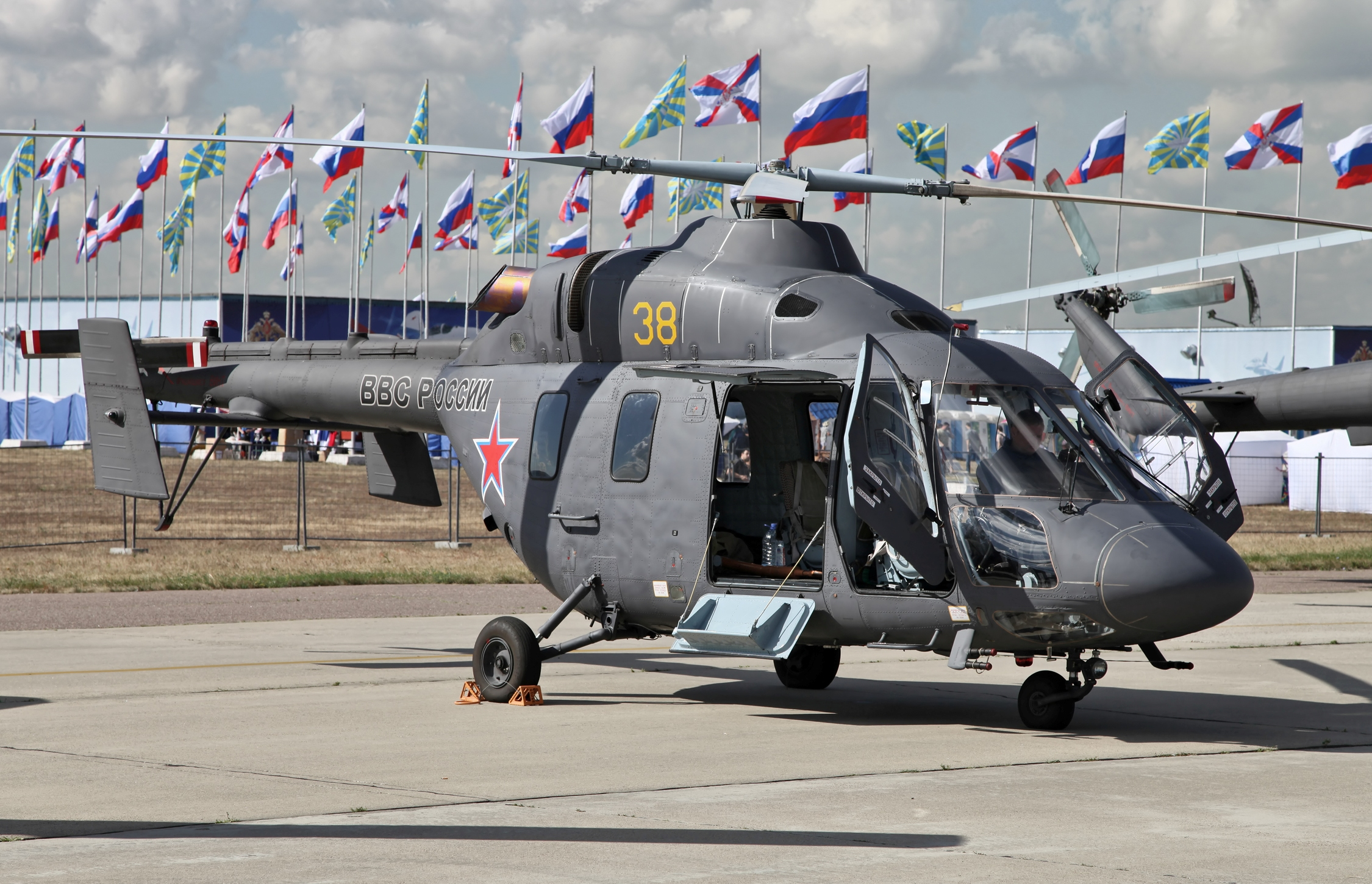
Kazan Ansat light helicopter built by Kazan Helicopters

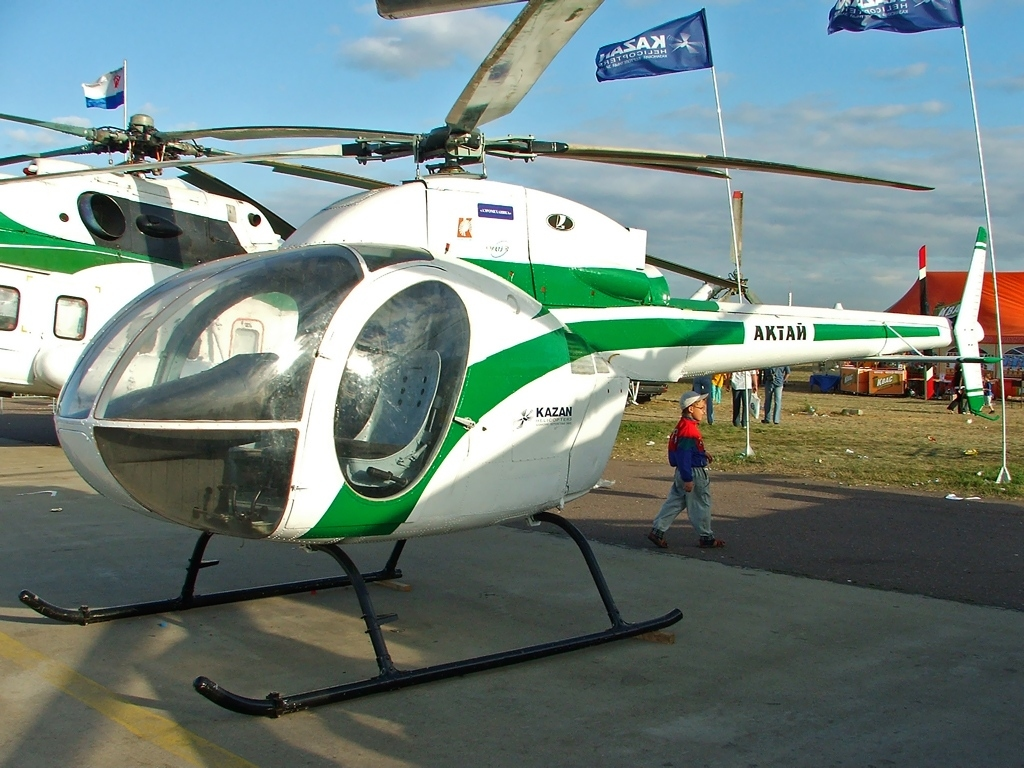
Kazan Aktai ultralight helicopter built by Kazan Helicopters

Kazan is one of the largest industrial and financial centres of Russia, and a leading city of the Volga economic region in construction and accumulated investment. Total banking capital of Kazan banks is third in Russia. The main industries of the city are: mechanical engineering, chemical, petrochemical, light and food industries. An innovative economy is represented by the largest IT-park in Russia which is one of the largest of its kind amongst Eastern Europe science parks. Kazan ranks 174th (highest in Russia) in Mercer’s Worldwide Quality of Living Survey.

== Macroeconomics ==
Main indicators of 2008
| Indicator | Value | Gross to 2007 |
|---|---|---|
| Total output volume, rub | 123,6 bln. | 107,4 % |
| Employed, inh. | 565 000 | |
| GRP, rub | 271,3 bln | 105 % |
| Average income, rub | 17 300 | 134 % |
| Retailing turnover, rub | 211 bln | 120,5 % |
| Investions, rub | 102 bln | |
| Expenditure, rub | 18,361 bln | |
| Revenue, rub | 17,76 bln | |
| Deficit, rub | 0,601 bln | |

== Plant facilities ==
Several Top-500 Russian companies are headquartered within city boundaries:

- TAIF (192,10 bln rub. annual receipt)
- Tatenergo (47,13 bln rub.)1
- Kazanorgsintez (21,19 bln rub.)
- Transtechservice (14,87 bln rub)
- Vamin (9,7 bln rub.)

There are 151 large- and middle-scale enterprises in Kazan city, 98 of them are JSCs. Main industries are: machinery construction, chemicals and petrochemicals, light and food industries. Factory shipments in 2008 year total 94,8 bln rub.

Main enterprises of the city:

- Kazanorgsintez

"Kazanorgsintez" JSC produces 38% of Russian polyethylene. It also produces a large variety of petrochemical and chemical products.

- Kazan Aircraft Production Association

KAPO currently produces the Tu-214 passenger plane and the Tu-160 strategic bomber. There are also plans to start producing Tu-334 regional airliners and Tu-330 freighters.

- Kazan Helicopters

Produces "Mi" helicopters.

- Kazan State Powder Mill

Founded in 1788.

- Kazan optical mechanics plant
- Kazan motors building production association
- "NEFIS-cosmetics" JSC (Kazan chemical complex)

Produces a large variety of cleaning agents

- Kazan brewery

Is a proper of EFES group.

- Kazan medical apparatus plant
- Kazan rubber plant ("KVART" JSC)
- Kazan heat devices plant
- Kazan artificial leather plant

== Banks ==
Largest banks of Kazan city are:

- Ak Bars Bank — net wealth for 01.10.08 — 190 bln rub.
- Tatfondbank — 40 bln rub.
- "Kazansky" bank — 10 bln rub.
- "Spurt" bank — 9,4 bln rub.
- Energobank — 9,0 bln rub.
- Intechbank — 5,6 bln rub.
- "Ipoteka-invest" — 3,6 bln rub.
- "Zarechye"
- Tatecobank
- Tatinvestbank
- Akibank
- BTA-Kazan
- Alfabank

== Tourism ==
A unique combination of historic city and modern megalopolis attracts tourists to Kazan. More than 1,000,000 tourists visited Kazan in 2010. Kazan Kremlin attracts more than 200,000 tourists per year. There are more than 83 hotels (5700 accommodations) in the city, including:

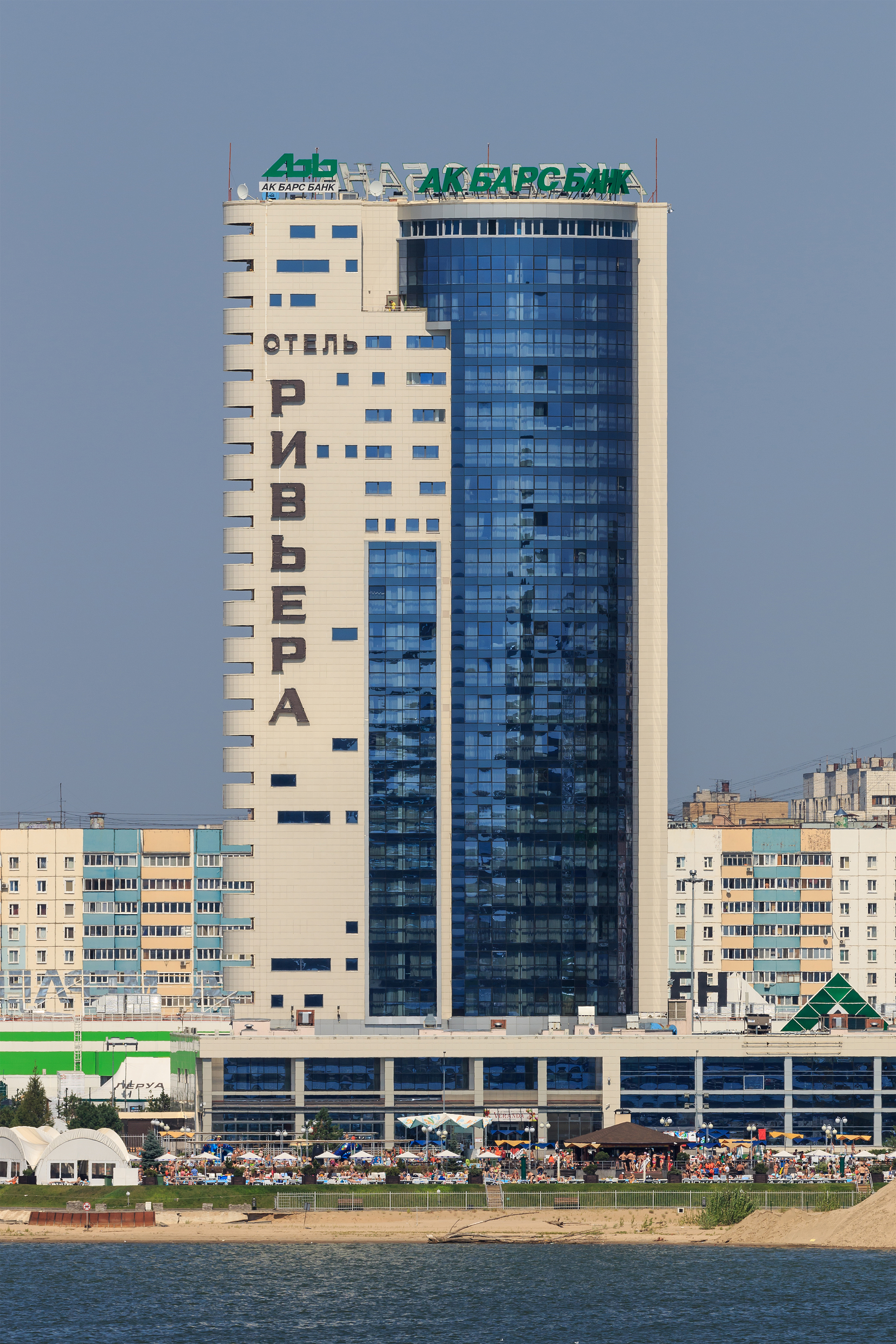
Riviera resort hotel

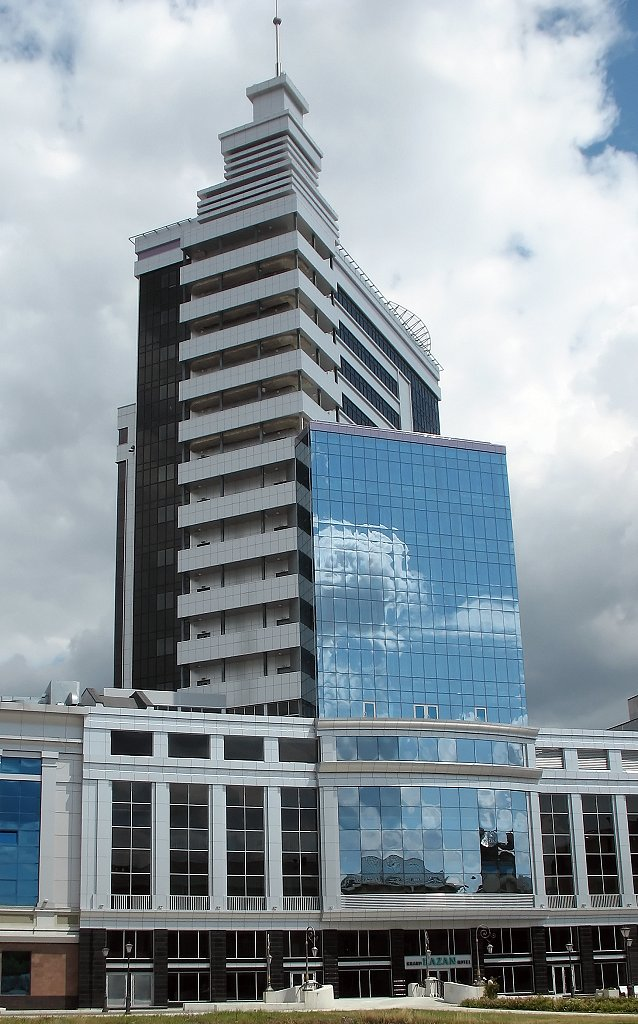
Grand hotel

| Stars | Hotel name |
|---|---|
| * * * * * | Mirage |
| * * * * | Courtyard-Marriott Kazan |
| * * * * | Bon Ami |
| * * * * | Grand Hotel |
| * * * * | Giuseppe |
| * * * * | Corston Hotel |
| * * * * | Riviera resort |
| * * * * | Suleiman Palace |
| * * * * | Shalyapin Palace |
| * * * * | Park Inn |
| * * * | Ryan Johnson |
| * * * | Amax-Safar |
| * * * | Bulgar |

| Stars | Hotel name |
|---|---|
| * * * | Ibis |
| * * * | Volga |
| * * * | Gulfstream |
| * * * | Derbyshky |
| * * * | Dusliq |
| * * * | Kolvy |
| * * * | Novinka |
| * * * | Teatral'naya mansion |
| * * * | Premium |
| * * * | Prestige House |
| * * * | Polyot |
| * * * | Regina (network) |
| * * * | Hayall |
| * * * | Tatar Inn |

== Construction ==
Apartment house construction (thousands m²)
| Year | Value |
|---|---|
| 2000 | 541.8 |
| 2003 | 611.3 |
| 2004 | 874.7 |
| 2005 | 632.0 |
| 2006 | 729.6 |
| 2007 | 742.3 |
| 2008 | 902 |
| 2009 | 723 |
| 2010 | 770 |
