= Rustem Sulteev =

Russian businessman and billionaire (born 1954)

- Born: 1954 (age 71–72); Kazan, Tatarstan, Russia
- Education: Kazan Institute of Civil Engineering
- Occupation: Businessman
- Known for: Co-owner of Russian TAIF Group
- Children: 2

Rustem Sulteev (born 1954) is a Russian businessman and billionaire. He is the co-owner of the TAIF Group, a Russian holding group with a focus in oil, gas and petrochemicals. According to Forbes, Sulteev's net worth is estimated at $1.08 billion. As of 2019, he was ranked as the 95th richest businessman in Russia.

== Early life and education ==
Sulteev was born in Kazan and attended the Kazan Institute of Civil Engineering. He graduated in 1976 with a bachelor's degree.

== Career ==
Sulteev began his career as a construction foreman. In 1983, he made the transition into civil engineering. His first major project involved the construction and maintenance of a factory for the Department of Bread and Baking Industry. The following year, he served as Deputy General Director for the construction of the second Bakery Plant in Kazan.

In 1985, Sulteev became the Deputy Head of the Directorate for Centrogaz. Between 1992 and 1995, he served as Deputy General Director of the Kazan Foreign Trade Research and Production Association.

Sulteev was named First Deputy General Director of TAIF Group in 1995. Together with his partners from the TAIF Group, Albert Shigaboutdinov and Radik Shaimiev he also own the Kazan bank Avers.

== Personal life ==
Sulteev is married and has two children. He lives with his wife in Kazan. Sulteev's son, Timur Sultyev, is the deputy general director of commerce for Russian chemical company Kazanorgsintez and is also a member of the TAIF board of directors.
