= Oleg Fomenko =

Russian footballer

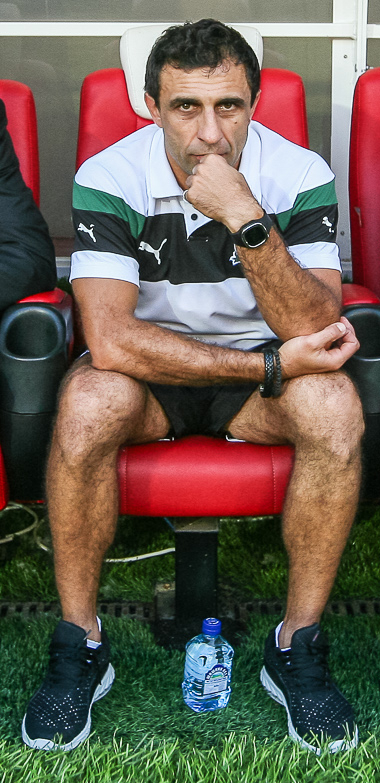
- Fomenko working with FC Krasnodar in 2016

Personal information
- Full name: Oleg Petrovich Fomenko
- Date of birth: 3 August 1972 (age 54)
- Place of birth: Grozny, Russian SFSR
- Height: 1.74 m (5 ft 9 in)
- Position: Midfielder

Team information
- Current team: PFC CSKA Moscow (assistant manager)

Senior career*
Years	Team	Apps	(Gls)
1991	FC Vaynakh Shali	36	(0)
1992	FC Start Yeysk	6	(0)
1992	FC Erzu Grozny	11	(1)
1992–1994	FC Druzhba Budyonnovsk	61	(4)
1994–1995	FC Angusht Nazran	7	(1)
1995	FC SKA Rostov-on-Don	22	(0)
1996–1997	FC Avtozapchast Baksan	58	(6)
1997–2002	FC Amkar Perm	170	(7)
2003	FC Ural Yekaterinburg	8	(0)
2003	PFC Spartak Nalchik	18	(0)
2004–2005	FC Neftekhimik Nizhnekamsk		(1)
2006	FC Angusht Nazran	74	(1)
2007	FC Spartak-MZhK Ryazan	41	(0)
2007–2009	FC Rubin Novolokinskaya	15	

Managerial career
- 2010–2018: FC Krasnodar (assistant)
- 2019: FC Krasnodar-2
- 2018-2020: FC Krasnodar (joint with Murad Musayev)
- 2020–2022: PFC Sochi (assistant)
- 2022–: PFC CSKA Moscow (assistant)
- * Club domestic league appearances and goals

Oleg Petrovich Fomenko (Russian: Олег Петрович Фоменко; born 3 August 1972) is a Russian football coach and a former player. He is an assistant coach with PFC CSKA Moscow.

== Playing career ==
He played 8 seasons in the second-tier Russian Football National League debut for 6 different teams.

== Coaching career ==
After the caretaking spell for FC Krasnodar manager Murad Musayev expired on 4 May 2018, Fomenko was officially registered with the Russian Premier League as the manager (head coach) of Krasnodar, with Musayev re-registered as his assistant, as Fomenko possessed the necessary UEFA Pro Licence at the time and Musayev did not. Despite the formal role adjustment, Musayev continued to manage the team and Fomenko to act as his assistant. Before the 2019–20 season, Fomenko was reassigned to coaching FC Krasnodar-2. He left Krasnodar by mutual consent on 30 October 2019.
