= Sibur-RT =

Russian investment and oil company

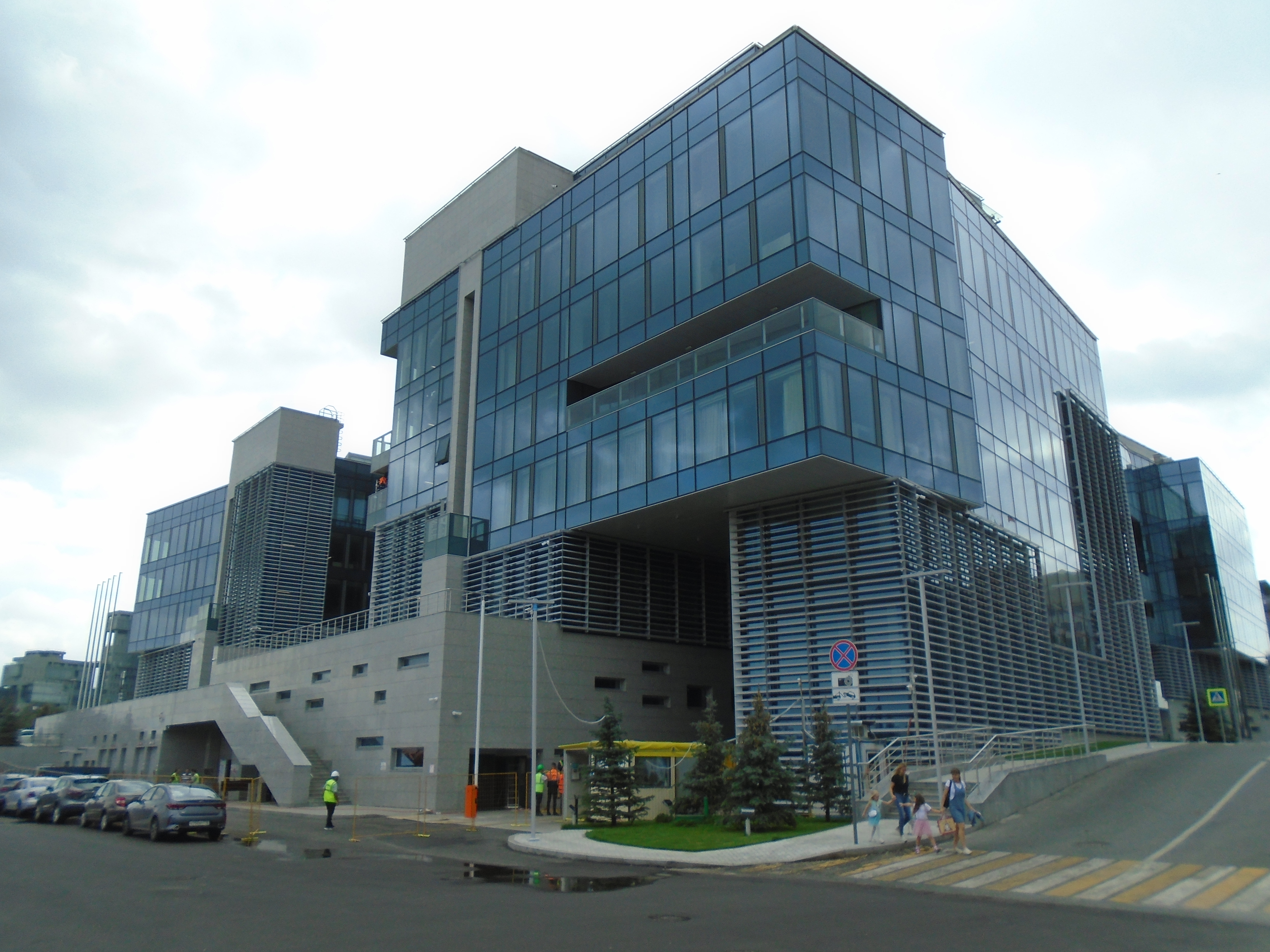
- TAIF's headquarters in Kazan, 2021
- Type: Private joint-stock company
- Industry: Crude oil, chemical industry, investments, construction, public services
- Predecessor: TAIF (Tatar-American Investment and Finance company)
- Founded: 1995 in Kazan, Russia
- Founder: Government of Tatarstan
- Headquarters: Kazan, Russia
- Area served: Russia
- Key people: Airat Safin (CEO, 2023–present)
- Products: Petrochemicals
- Parent: Sibur
- Website: taif.ru

Sibur-RT JSC, formerly TAIF JSC (Tatar-American Investment and Finance company), is a Russian investment holding and oil company headquartered in Kazan. As of 2008, it accounted for up to 98% of gas, chemical, and petrochemical processing in the Tatarstan region.

By 2015, it had incorporated a number of subsidiaries, including TAIF-Invest, TAIF-ST, TAIF Service, Avers Bank, Avers Insurance Company, the television companies TVT and Novy Vek, Karsar, and TAIF-Telecom. In 2019, the company was listed among the largest privately owned corporations in Russia.

In April 2021, it agreed to merge with the Sibur petrochemicals holding. In April 2022, the company changed its name to Sibur-RT JSC.

== History ==
=== Expansion ===
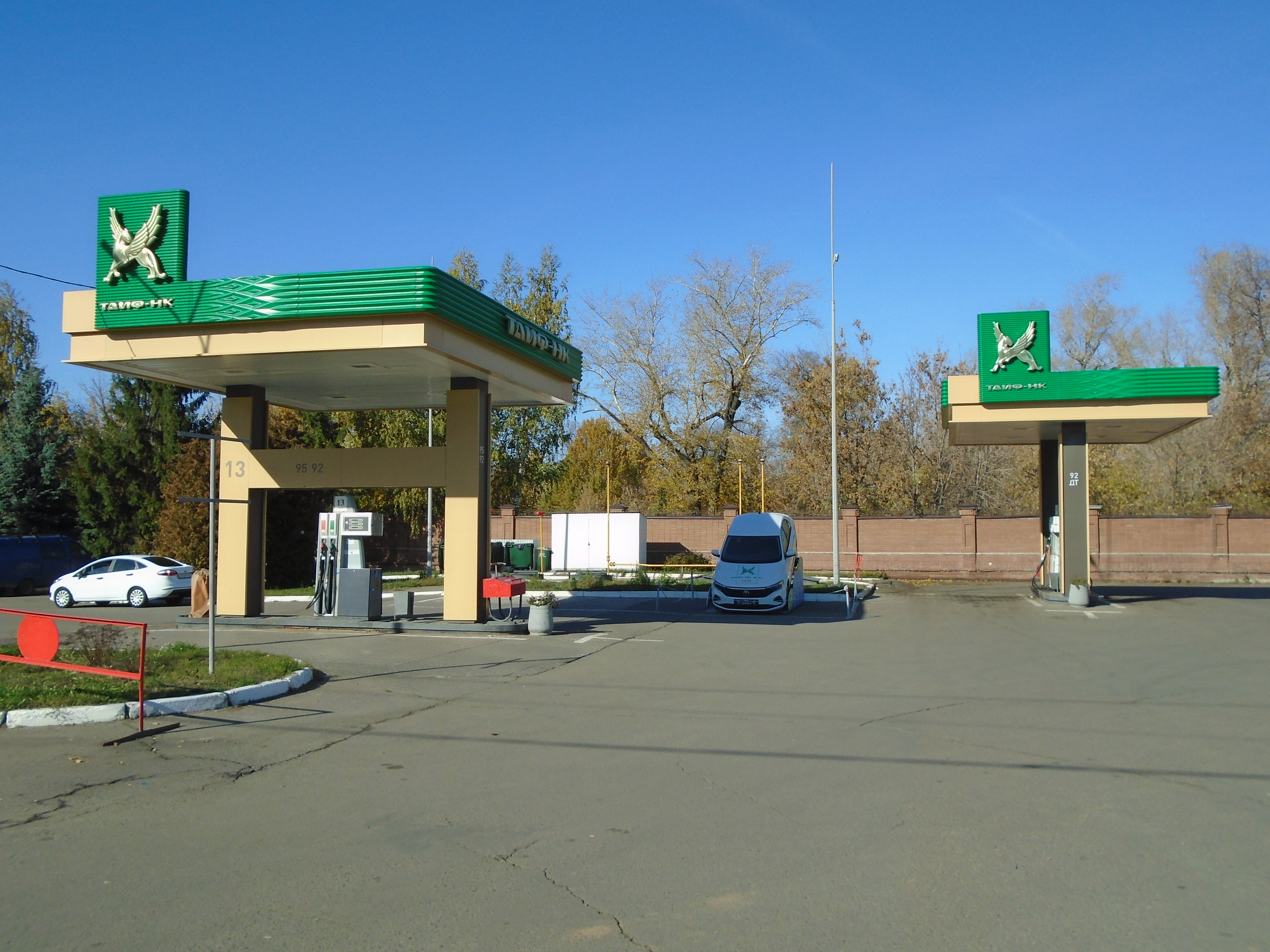
One of TAIF's petrol stations in Kazan, 2021

The Tatar-American Investment and Finance company (TAIF) was created on the basis of the Kazan Foreign Trade Association, established in 1990 by the government of the Tatar Autonomous Soviet Socialist Republic. Whereas the Trade Association had been assembled to cope with supply shortages in the region, TAIF's main task was to prepare the privatization plans of the republic's largest enterprises. The government of Tatarstan acquired a controlling interest in the new company and provided it with stakes in several leading republican enterprises, including Tatneft (4%), Kazanorgsintez (3%), Nizhnekamskshina, and Nizhnekamskneftekhim (9%). An American company, NKS Trading, became another shareholder of TAIF when it invested ten million dollars and bought 36% of the shares.

Before the end of the century, most of TAIF's principal subsidiaries had been established. In June 1996, the company founded its first subsidiary, Meta-TAIF, to participate in the republican programme of liquidating dilapidated housing. A year later, the newly created TAIF-Invest received a brokerage licence; LLC Karsar was acquired to act as an intermediary in import, export, and customs activities; and CJSC TAIF-NK was organised in Neftekamsk to build an oil-processing plant. With the emergence of TAIF-Telecom in 1998 and the TVT radio and television company in 1999, the company expanded into media holdings. In the same year, TAIF also opened a transportation company, TAIF-Magistral, and two construction enterprises, TAIF-Art and TAIF-ST.

Over the following years, the company acquired or established around 30 subsidiaries, mostly in investment, construction, services, and the petrochemical industry. By the end of 2005, TAIF had bought the shares of Tatneft and Nizhnekamskneftekhim (54.2% in total) in the Nizhnekamsk oil refinery, thereby acquiring full control of it. Following its purchase of the controlling stakes in Kazanorgsintez and Nizhnekamskneftekhim in 2006, TAIF became the provider of 96% of services in the chemical, petrochemical, oil, and gas-processing industries in Tatarstan. In the same year, its subsidiary TAIF-Finance placed a four-year bond issue worth 4 billion rubles on the Moscow Interbank Currency Exchange, with a first coupon of 8.42% per annum. TAIF has not conducted an IPO.

According to Forbes, TAIF's investments in modernising its subsidiaries' production capacities had increased revenue by 2009; Kazanorgsintez's revenue, for instance, was reported to have doubled since its acquisition by TAIF in 2006.

According to Forbes's rankings, in 2012 TAIF was one of the largest non-public companies in Russia.

In 2015, the company extended its activities in the oil and gas industry by acquiring a controlling interest in Tatnefteproduct.

TAIF's CEO, Albert Shigabutdinov, announced a further launch of TAIF's IPO in an interview with the newspaper Vedomosti and stated that, by 2019, the company's EBITDA had almost doubled compared with the previous year (TAIF estimated it at 166 billion rubles). He also stated that the production of various polymers was TAIF's main source of income and that the holding had increased its chemical output almost eightfold between 1995 and 2019. According to Shigabutdinov, in 2019 investments constituted up to 22% of the company's revenue, construction about 0.5%, and the service sector (petrol stations, entertainment centres, customs, and warehouses) up to 4%. Some analysts, however, linked the growth in TAIF's EBITDA to Shigabutdinov's announced resignation and considered investment in TAIF to carry risk.

=== Merger with Sibur ===
In 2018–2019, the TAIF holding was reorganised and split into TAIF Management Company and TAIF JSC. The former united the subsidiaries active in telecommunications, construction, and services; the latter controlled the oil, gas, and chemical companies, including Kazanorgsintez, Nizhnekamskneftekhim, and TGC-16. In April 2021, TAIF Management Company signed an agreement to merge TAIF JSC with Sibur, one of the largest petrochemical companies in Russia. Under the terms finalised in September 2021, TAIF's shareholders would receive a 15% stake in the new combined company in exchange for 50% plus one share of TAIF JSC, with an option over the remaining stake to be exercised early, so that the combined entity would consolidate 100% of TAIF Group's petrochemical and energy companies. At the same time, the TAIF-NK refinery, TAIF's Karsar petrol-station network, and a number of other assets would remain the property of TAIF Management Company. The deal was finalised in October 2021. In April 2022, Sibur renamed TAIF JSC "Sibur-RT JSC".

As of 2022, TAIF Management Company controlled a number of subsidiaries, including the oil-refining company TAIF-NK.

== Owners ==
Before the 2010s, details about TAIF's shareholders were not publicly disclosed. According to Albert Shigabutdinov, the company's debt exceeded 500 million dollars after the 1998 Russian financial crisis, and the company was privatised around the same period. Shigabutdinov also reported that, in 2002, TAIF was controlled by the Shaimiev, Shigabutdinov, and Sulteev families. In 2005, Mintimer Shaimiev, the first president of Tatarstan, stated in an interview that his son Radik Shaimiev owned some shares of TAIF as one of the company's founders.

The full list of TAIF's owners became known only in 2014, when it was published in the materials of the Moscow Arbitration Court. According to those materials, Radik Shaimiev owned 11.46% of the company's shares; Airat Shaimiev, Mintimer Shaimiev's second son, 11.45%; Rustem Sulteev and his wife Lidia Sulteeva collectively held 19.9%, and Albert Shigabutdinov and his son Timur held the same proportion. Smaller holdings included those of Guzelia Safina, TAIF's Deputy General Director (4.5%), the National Settlement Depository (4.84%), Avers Bank (2.42%), and several Austrian entities (each about 1%).

== See also ==
- Energy in Russia
- Energy policy of Russia
- Energy policy of the Soviet Union
- Petroleum industry in Russia
