= Murad Musayev =

Russian football coach of Avar origin (born 1983)

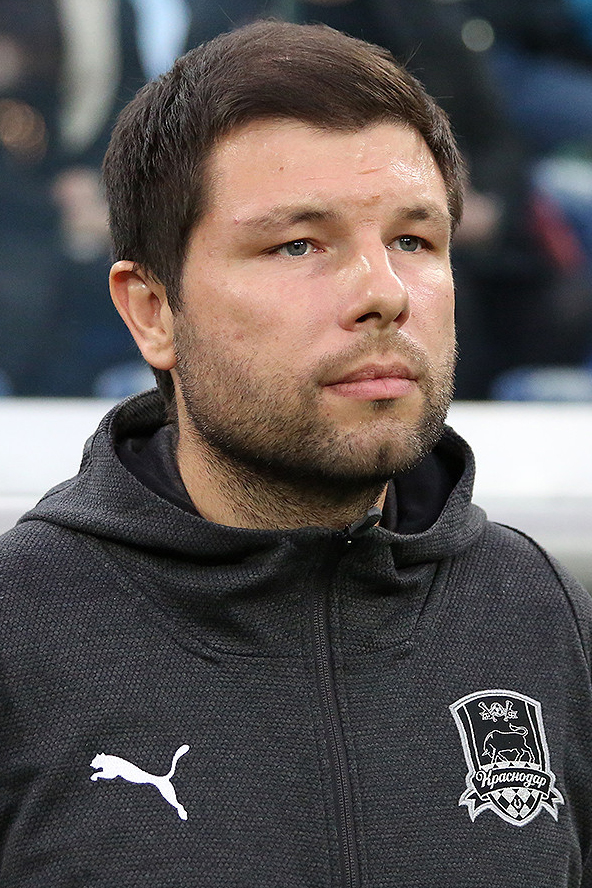
- Musayev coaching Krasnodar in 2018

Personal information
- Full name: Murad Olegovich Musayev
- Date of birth: 10 November 1983 (age 43)
- Place of birth: Krasnodar, Russian SFSR, Soviet Union

Team information
- Current team: Krasnodar (head coach)

Managerial career
- Years: Team
- 2005–2011: Krasnodar-2000
- 2018–2021: Krasnodar
- 2021–2024: Sabah
- 2024–: Krasnodar

Murad Olegovich Musayev (Russian: Мурад Олегович Мусаев; born 10 November 1983) is a Russian football coach and current head coach of Krasnodar.

== Club career ==
He led the Under-19 team of FC Krasnodar to the 2017–18 UEFA Youth League knockout phase, where they were eliminated by Real Madrid only in a shootout in front of the sold-out Krasnodar Stadium.

On 3 April 2018, following the firing of Igor Shalimov, he was appointed the caretaker manager of FC Krasnodar. After his caretaking spell was over in early May, he could not be registered as manager with the Russian Premier League due to lack of UEFA Pro Licence (Musayev only held UEFA B Licence at the time), so Oleg Fomenko was formally registered with the league as head coach and Musayev as his senior assistant coach, but Musayev de facto continued to manage the team. He received his UEFA A Licence later in 2018, but that still didn't make him eligible to be registered as the head coach. Before the 2019–20 season, Fomenko moved to FC Krasnodar-2 and Sergey Matveyev was hired by FC Krasnodar as head coach. Musayev passed his UEFA Pro Licence exam in the summer of 2020 and was officially registered with the league as Krasnodar's manager on 20 June 2020. He led Krasnodar to their first qualification to the group stage of the UEFA Champions League in the 2020–21 season. He resigned from Krasnodar on 3 April 2021 following a string of bad results after 2020–21 season was resumed after a winter break, including a biggest ever club defeat (1–6 to FC Spartak Moscow away) and a biggest ever home loss (0–5 to FC Akhmat Grozny).

On 30 October 2021, he signed a two-year contract with Azerbaijan Premier League club Sabah. On 1 February 2024, Sabah announced that Musayev had left his role as head coach after his resignation had been accepted.

On 14 March 2024, Krasnodar announced the return of Musayev as head coach of the club, on a contract until the end of the season. On 29 May 2024, his contract with Krasnodar was extended to June 2026.

Krasnodar began the 2024–25 Russian Premier League season with 14 unbeaten games, including a club-record streak of 11 wins, taking the top spot in the standings. On 24 May 2025, Krasnodar won the RPL title for the first time in club's history.

== Personal life ==
On his father's side, he is of Uzbek and Russian descent, the grandson of an Uzbek from Bukhara, and on his mother's side, he is Russian.

== Manager statistics ==
As of 22 November 2026

Managerial record by team and tenure
Team	From	To	Record					Ref
Team	From	To	P	W	D	L	Win %	Ref
Krasnodar	3 April 2018	3 April 2021	126	57	29	40	45.2	
Sabah	30 October 2021	1 February 2024	87	48	16	23	55.2	
Krasnodar	14 March 2024	Present	113	65	27	21	57.5	
Total			326	170	72	84	52.1	—

== Honours ==
Krasnodar

- Russian Premier League: 2024–25

Individual

- Russian Premier League coach of the month: September 2024, October 2024, October 2025, November/December 2025, July/August 2026.
