= Russian Premier League =

Russian national top division professional association football league

- Organising body: Russian Football Union (RFU)
- Founded: 1992 (as Top League); 2001 (as Premier League)
- Country: Russia
- Confederation: UEFA
- Number of clubs: 16
- Level on pyramid: 1
- Relegation to: First League
- Domestic cup(s): Russian Cup; Russian Super Cup
- Current champions: Zenit Saint Petersburg (11th title) (2025–26)
- Most championships: Zenit Saint Petersburg (11 titles)
- Most appearances: Igor Akinfeev (615)
- Top scorer: Artem Dzyuba (178)
- Broadcasters: List of broadcasters
- Website: premierliga.ru
- Current: 2026–27 Russian Premier League

The Russian Premier League (RPL; Russian: Российская премьер-лига, Rossiyskaya premyer-liga; РПЛ), also written as Russian Premier Liga, is a professional association football league in Russia and the highest level of the Russian football league system. It was established at the end of 2001 as the Russian Football Premier League (RFPL; Russian: Российская футбольная премьер-лига; РФПЛ) and was rebranded in 2018. From 1992 through 2001, the top level of the Russian league system was the Russian Football Championship (Russian: Чемпионат России по футболу, Chempionat Rossii po Futbolu).

There are 16 teams in the competition. As of the 2021/22 season, the league had two Champions League qualifying spots for the league winners and league runners-up, and two spots in the UEFA Conference League were allocated to the third- and fourth-placed teams. However, those have all been suspended, along with the national team's participation in international competitions. The last two teams are relegated to the Russian First League at the end of the season, while the 13th and 14th placed teams compete against the National League's 4th and 3rd teams respectively in a two-legged playoff.

The Russian Premier League succeeded the Top Division including history and records. The Top Division was run by the Professional Football League of Russia. Since July 2026, the league is called Alfa-Bank Russian Premier League (Russian: Альфа Банк Российская премьер-лига), also written as Mir Russian Premier Liga (after the bank ), for sponsorship reasons.

Since the introduction of the Russian Premier League in 2002, Zenit Saint Petersburg (11 times), Spartak Moscow (10 times), CSKA Moscow (6 times), Lokomotiv Moscow (3 times), Rubin Kazan (2 times) and Krasnodar (1 time) have won the title. Zenit are the reigning champions, winning the competition in 2025–26.

== History ==
After the dissolution of the Soviet Union, starting in 1992, each former Soviet republic organized an independent national championship. In Russia, the six Russian teams who had played in the Soviet Top League in 1991 (CSKA Moscow, Spartak Moscow, Torpedo Moscow, Dynamo Moscow, Spartak Vladikavkaz, and Lokomotiv Moscow) were supplemented with 14 teams from lower divisions to form a 20-team Russian Top Division. The Top Division was divided into two groups to reduce the total number of matches. The number of teams in the Top Division was reduced to 18 in 1993 and 16 in 1994. Since then, the Russian Top Division (and the Premier League since 2002) has consisted of 16 teams, except for a short-lived experiment with having two more teams in 1996 and 1997.

Spartak Moscow won nine of the first ten titles. Spartak-Alania Vladikavkaz was the only team which managed to break Spartak's dominance, winning the top division title in 1995. Lokomotiv Moscow have won the title three times, and CSKA Moscow six times. In 2007, Zenit St. Petersburg won the title for the first time in their history in Russian professional football; they had also won a Soviet title in 1984. 2008 brought the rise of Rubin Kazan, a club entirely new to the Russian top flight, as it had never competed in the Soviet Top League.

In preparation for the 2018–19 season, it was decided to hold a rebranding in which a new logo was presented.

In 2022, all Russian club and national teams were banned from European competition indefinitely. Spartak Moscow, who were competing in the UEFA Europa League and were the only Russian club team remaining in European competition at the time, were disqualified from their tie against RB Leipzig, who advanced on a walkover.

== Competition ==
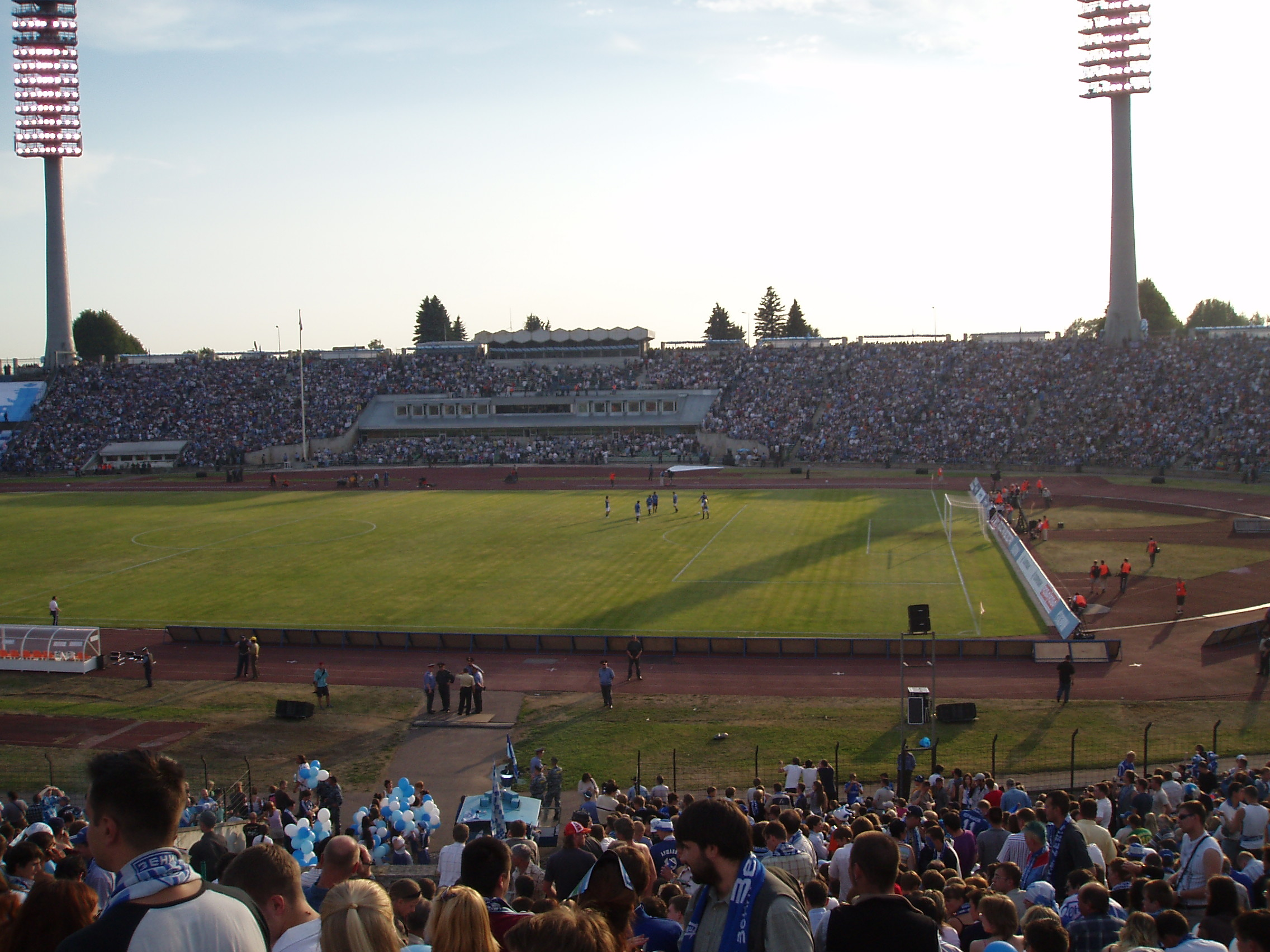
Russian Premier League match between Zenit and Dynamo (the last Zenit match at the Kirov Stadium, stadium had been already partially demolished.)

Teams in the Russian Premier League play each other twice, once at home and once away, for a total of 30 matches. Three points are awarded for a win, one for a draw, and none for a loss. If teams are level on points, the tie-breakers are the number of wins, then the goal difference, followed by several other factors. If the teams are tied for the first position, the tie-breakers are the number of wins, then head-to-head results. If the teams tied for the first place cannot be separated by these tie-breakers, a championship play-off is ordered.

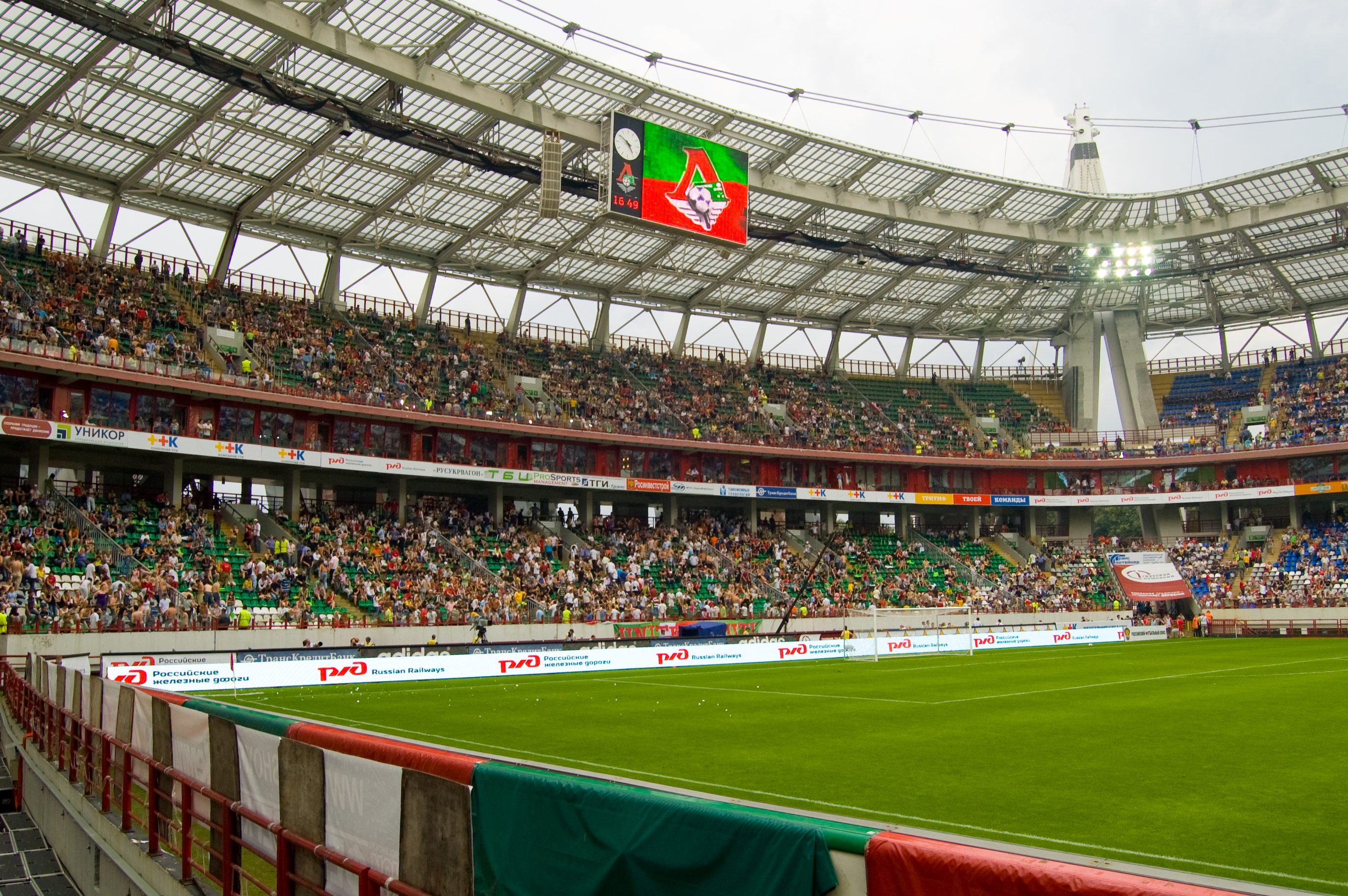
Russian Premier League match between Lokomotiv and Spartak at the RZD Arena

As of 2020–21 season, the champions qualify for the UEFA Champions League group stage. The runners-up qualifies for the Champions League third qualifying round. The third and fourth-place teams qualify for the UEFA Europa Conference League. If the winner of Russian Cup ends in first or second on the championship in same season, then the third-place team qualifies to UEFA Europa League group stage, while fourth and fifth-place teams qualify for the UEFA Europa Conference League instead. The bottom two teams are relegated to the First League. Starting on the 2020–21 season the teams ranked in 13th and 14th-place play a two legs relegation play-off against 4th and 3rd-place team from National League. The two winners of this play-off secures the right to play in Premier League in following season.

Unlike most other European football leagues, the league traditionally used to run in summer, from March to November, to avoid playing games in the cold and snowy weather in winter. This was altered ahead of the 2012–13 season, with the league planning to run the season from autumn to spring. The transitional season of the competition began in early 2011 and continued until summer of 2012. After the 16 Premier League teams played each other twice over the course of the 2011 calendar year, they were split into two groups of eight, and the teams played other teams in their groups two more times for a total of 44 games (30 in 2011 and 14 in 2012). Those two groups were contested in spring 2012, with the top eight clubs playing for the title and European places. The other sides vied to avoid relegation: the bottom two went down while the next two played off against the sides third and fourth in the National Football League, with the two losers being relegated (or denied promotion). Under the current autumn-spring calendar, the league takes a three-month winter break from mid-December until mid-March. Merging the calendar with other UEFA leagues however, has increased numbers of games in winter. This has resulted in the Russian Far East and Siberian teams being forced to play more home games in hostile weather conditions which affected the Premier League when SKA Khabarovsk took part.

== Youth championship ==
The Youth championship (Russian: Молодежное первенство), also known as Youth teams championship (Russian: Первенство молодёжных команд), Reserve team tournament (Russian: Турнир дублирующих составов) or Reserves tournament (Russian: Турнир дублёров), full name Youth football championship of Russia among teams of clubs of the Premier League (Russian: Молодёжное Первенство России по футболу среди команд клубов Премьер-Лиги), is a league that runs in parallel to the Russian Premier League and includes the youth or reserve teams of the Russian Premier League teams. The number of players a team can have on the pitch at a time that are over 21 years of age or without a Russian citizenship is limited. 16 teams participate in the league. Matches are commonly played a day before the match of the senior teams of the respective teams. All of the Russian Premier League teams are obliged to have a youth team that would participate in the Youth championship. The teams that are promoted from the National Football League and do not have a youth team must create one. The teams in the league are not relegated based on their final league position, but on the league position of their respective clubs' senior teams.

However, some Premier League clubs have three teams. Apart from the senior team and the team that plays in the Youth championship a team might have another senior team that plays in a lower division of Russian football and serves as the farm team for the main team. An example is Krasnodar-2, playing in the Russian First League.

Reserves tournament champions (2001–2007)

- 2001: Rotor Volgograd
- 2002: Dynamo Moscow
- 2003: Dynamo Moscow
- 2004: Terek Grozny
- 2005: CSKA Moscow
- 2006: Spartak Moscow
- 2007: Spartak Moscow

Youth championship winners (since 2008)

- 2008: Spartak Moscow
- 2009: Zenit Saint Petersburg
- 2010: Spartak Moscow
- 2011: Lokomotiv Moscow
- 2012: Dynamo Moscow
- 2012–13: Spartak Moscow
- 2013–14: Dynamo Moscow
- 2014–15: Dynamo Moscow
- 2015–16: Lokomotiv Moscow
- 2016–17: Spartak Moscow
- 2017–18: Krasnodar
- 2018–19: CSKA Moscow
- 2019–20: Dynamo Moscow
- 2020–21: CSKA Moscow
- 2021–22: CSKA Moscow
- 2022–23: Krasnodar
- 2023: Lokomotiv Moscow
- 2024: CSKA Moscow
- 2025: Zenit Saint Petersburg

== UEFA club rankings ==
In 2022 Russia have been suspended from UEFA and from participating in UEFA competitions and therefore the UEFA coefficient ranking of the Russian Premier League is an automatic 0.

== Current clubs ==
Locations of teams in 2025–26 Russian Premier League

The following teams are competing in the 2025–26 season:

Team	Home city	Stadium	Capacity	Head coach
Akron Tolyatti	Zhigulyovsk	Solidarity Samara Arena	42,389	(Russia) Zaur Tedeyev
Akhmat Grozny	Grozny	Akhmat Arena	30,000	(Russia) Stanislav Cherchesov
Baltika Kaliningrad	Kaliningrad	Rostec Arena	33,399	(Russia) Andrey Talalayev
CSKA Moscow	Moscow	VEB Arena	29,071	(Switzerland) Fabio Celestini
Dynamo Makhachkala	Makhachkala	Anzhi Arena	26,364	(Russia) Vadim Yevseyev
Dynamo Moscow	Moscow	VTB Arena	25,716	(Russia) Rolan Gusev
Krasnodar	Krasnodar	Ozon Arena	33,395	(Russia) Murad Musayev
Krylia Sovetov	Samara	Solidarity Samara Arena	42,389	(Russia) Magomed Adiyev
Lokomotiv Moscow	Moscow	RZD Arena	27,084	(Russia) Mikhail Galaktionov
FC Nizhny Novgorod	Nizhny Novgorod	Sovcombank Arena	42,532	(Belarus) Aleksey Shpilevsky
Orenburg	Orenburg	Gazovik	10,046	(Russia) Ildar Akhmetzyanov
Rostov	Rostov-on-Don	Rostov Arena	45,415	(Spain) Jonatan Alba
Rubin Kazan	Kazan	Ak Bars Arena	43,284	(Spain) Franc Artiga
Sochi	Sochi	Fisht	45,994	(Russia) Igor Osinkin
Spartak Moscow	Moscow	Lukoil Arena	44,897	(Spain) Juan Carlos Carcedo
Zenit Saint Petersburg	Saint Petersburg	Gazprom Arena	60,177	(Russia) Sergei Semak

== Champions ==
Season	Champions	Runners-up	Third place	Top scorer
1992	Spartak Moscow	Spartak Vladikavkaz	Dynamo Moscow	(Russia) Yuri Matveyev (Uralmash Yekaterinburg, 20 goals)
1993	Spartak Moscow (2)	Rotor Volgograd	Dynamo Moscow (2)	(Russia) Victor Panchenko (KamAZ Naberezhnye Chelny, 21 goals)
1994	Spartak Moscow (3)	Dynamo Moscow	Lokomotiv Moscow	(Russia) Igor Simutenkov (Dinamo Moscow, 21 goals)
1995	Spartak-Alania Vladikavkaz	Lokomotiv Moscow	Spartak Moscow	(Russia) Oleg Veretennikov (Rotor Volgograd, 25 goals)
1996	Spartak Moscow (4)	Alania Vladikavkaz (2)	Rotor Volgograd	(Russia) Aleksandr Maslov (Rostselmash, 23 goals)
1997	Spartak Moscow (5)	Rotor Volgograd (2)	Dynamo Moscow (3)	(Russia) Oleg Veretennikov (Rotor Volgograd, 22 goals)
1998	Spartak Moscow (6)	CSKA Moscow	Lokomotiv Moscow (2)	(Russia) Oleg Veretennikov (Rotor Volgograd, 22 goals)
1999	Spartak Moscow (7)	Lokomotiv Moscow (2)	CSKA Moscow	(Georgia (country)) Georgi Demetradze (Alania Vladikavkaz, 21 goals)
2000	Spartak Moscow (8)	Lokomotiv Moscow (3)	Torpedo Moscow	(Russia) Dmitri Loskov (Lokomotiv Moscow, 18 goals)
2001	Spartak Moscow (9)	Lokomotiv Moscow (4)	Zenit Saint Petersburg	(Russia) Dmitri Vyazmikin (Torpedo Moscow, 18 goals)
2002	Lokomotiv Moscow	CSKA Moscow (2)	Spartak Moscow (2)	(Russia) Rolan Gusev (CSKA Moscow, 15 goals) (Russia) Dmitri Kirichenko (CSKA Moscow, 15 goals)
2003	CSKA Moscow	Zenit Saint Petersburg	Rubin Kazan	(Russia) Dmitri Loskov (Lokomotiv Moscow, 14 goals)
2004	Lokomotiv Moscow (2)	CSKA Moscow (3)	Krylia Sovetov Samara	(Russia) Aleksandr Kerzhakov (Zenit St. Petersburg, 18 goals)
2005	CSKA Moscow (2)	Spartak Moscow	Lokomotiv Moscow (3)	(Russia) Dmitri Kirichenko (Moscow, 14 goals)
2006	CSKA Moscow (3)	Spartak Moscow (2)	Lokomotiv Moscow (4)	(Russia) Roman Pavlyuchenko (Spartak Moscow, 18 goals)
2007	Zenit Saint Petersburg	Spartak Moscow (3)	CSKA Moscow (2)	(Russia) Roman Pavlyuchenko (Spartak Moscow, 14 goals) (Russia) Roman Adamov (Moscow, 14 goals)
2008	Rubin Kazan	CSKA Moscow (4)	Dynamo Moscow (4)	(Brazil) Vágner Love (CSKA Moscow, 20 goals)
2009	Rubin Kazan (2)	Spartak Moscow (4)	Zenit Saint Petersburg (2)	(Brazil) Welliton (Spartak Moscow, 21 goals)
2010	Zenit Saint Petersburg (2)	CSKA Moscow (5)	Rubin Kazan (2)	(Brazil) Welliton (Spartak Moscow, 19 goals)
2011–12	Zenit Saint Petersburg (3)	Spartak Moscow (5)	CSKA Moscow (3)	(Ivory Coast) Seydou Doumbia (CSKA Moscow, 28 goals)
2012–13	CSKA Moscow (4)	Zenit Saint Petersburg (2)	Anzhi Makhachkala	(Armenia) Yura Movsisyan (Krasnodar/Spartak Moscow, 13 goals) (Brazil) Wánderson (Krasnodar, 13 goals)
2013–14	CSKA Moscow (5)	Zenit Saint Petersburg (3)	Lokomotiv Moscow (5)	(Ivory Coast) Seydou Doumbia (CSKA Moscow, 18 goals)
2014–15	Zenit Saint Petersburg (4)	CSKA Moscow (6)	Krasnodar	(Brazil) Hulk (Zenit Saint Petersburg, 15 goals)
2015–16	CSKA Moscow (6)	Rostov	Zenit Saint Petersburg (3)	(Russia) Fyodor Smolov (Krasnodar, 20 goals)
2016–17	Spartak Moscow (10)	CSKA Moscow (7)	Zenit Saint Petersburg (4)	(Russia) Fyodor Smolov (Krasnodar, 18 goals)
2017–18	Lokomotiv Moscow (3)	CSKA Moscow (8)	Spartak Moscow (3)	(Netherlands) Quincy Promes (Spartak Moscow, 15 goals)
2018–19	Zenit Saint Petersburg (5)	Lokomotiv Moscow (5)	Krasnodar (2)	(Russia) Fyodor Chalov (CSKA Moscow, 15 goals)
2019–20	Zenit Saint Petersburg (6)	Lokomotiv Moscow (6)	Krasnodar (3)	(Iran) Sardar Azmoun (Zenit Saint Petersburg, 17 goals) (Russia) Artem Dzyuba (Zenit Saint Petersburg, 17 goals)
2020–21	Zenit Saint Petersburg (7)	Spartak Moscow (6)	Lokomotiv Moscow (6)	(Russia) Artem Dzyuba (Zenit Saint Petersburg, 20 goals)
2021–22	Zenit Saint Petersburg (8)	Sochi	Dynamo Moscow (5)	(Russia) Gamid Agalarov (Ufa, 19 goals)
2022–23	Zenit Saint Petersburg (9)	CSKA Moscow (9)	Spartak Moscow (4)	(Brazil) Malcom (Zenit Saint Petersburg, 23 goals)
2023–24	Zenit Saint Petersburg (10)	Krasnodar (1)	Dynamo Moscow (6)	(Colombia) Mateo Cassierra (Zenit Saint Petersburg, 21 goals)
2024–25	Krasnodar (1)	Zenit Saint Petersburg (4)	CSKA Moscow (4)	(Costa Rica) Manfred Ugalde (Spartak Moscow, 17 goals)
2025-26	Zenit Saint Petersburg (11)	Krasnodar (2)	Lokomotiv Moscow (7)	(Colombia) Jhon Córdoba (Krasnodar, 17 goals)

=== Performance by club ===
Club	Winners	Runners-up	Third place	Seasons won
Zenit Saint Petersburg	11	4	4	2007, 2010, 2011–12, 2014–15, 2018–19, 2019–20, 2020–21, 2021–22, 2022–23, 2023–24, 2025–26
Spartak Moscow	10	6	4	1992, 1993, 1994, 1996, 1997, 1998, 1999, 2000, 2001, 2016–17
CSKA Moscow	6	9	4	2003, 2005, 2006, 2012–13, 2013–14, 2015–16
Lokomotiv Moscow	3	6	7	2002, 2004, 2017–18
Rubin Kazan	2	0	2	2008, 2009
Krasnodar	1	2	3	2024–25
Alania Vladikavkaz	1	2	0	1995
Rotor Volgograd	0	2	1	
Dynamo Moscow	0	1	6	
Rostov	0	1	0	
Sochi	0	1	0	
Torpedo Moscow	0	0	1	
Krylia Sovetov Samara	0	0	1	
Anzhi Makhachkala	0	0	1	
Total	34	34	34	

== Russian all-time champions ==
Club	Titles	Seasons Won	Runners up
Spartak Moscow	22	1936(a), 1938, 1939, 1952, 1953, 1956, 1958, 1962, 1969, 1979, 1987, 1989, 1992, 1993, 1994, 1996, 1997, 1998, 1999, 2000, 2001, 2016–17	18
CSKA Moscow	13	1946, 1947, 1948, 1950, 1951, 1970, 1991, 2003, 2005, 2006, 2012–13, 2013–14, 2015–16	13
Zenit Saint Petersburg	12	1984, 2007, 2010, 2011–12, 2014–15, 2018–19, 2019–20, 2020–21, 2021–22, 2022–23, 2023–24, 2025–26	4
Dynamo Moscow	11	1936(s), 1937, 1940, 1945, 1949, 1954, 1955, 1957, 1959, 1963, 1976(s)	12
Lokomotiv Moscow	3	2002, 2004, 2017–18	7
Torpedo Moscow	3	1960, 1965, 1976(a)	3
Rubin Kazan	2	2008, 2009	0
Alania Vladikavkaz	1	1995	2
Krasnodar	1	2024–25	1

== Most seasons by club (1992–2026) ==
A total of 52 teams have competed in at least one season at the top division. Spartak Moscow, CSKA Moscow and Lokomotiv Moscow are the only teams to have played in the top division in every season since the league's inception at 1992. The teams in bold participate in the 2025–26 Premier League.

Seasons	Clubs
34	**Spartak Moscow**, **CSKA Moscow**, **Lokomotiv Moscow**
33	**Dynamo Moscow**
32	**Rostov**
31	**Zenit Saint Petersburg**, **Krylia Sovetov Samara**
22	**Rubin Kazan**
19	**Akhmat Grozny**
17	Torpedo Moscow
16	Alania Vladikavkaz, Ural Yekaterinburg
15	**Krasnodar**
14	Rotor Volgograd, Amkar Perm
12	Saturn Ramenskoye
11	Anzhi Makhachkala
10	Shinnik Yaroslavl
9	Moscow, Tom Tomsk, Kuban Krasnodar
8	Lokomotiv Nizhny Novgorod, Chernomorets Novorossiysk, Ufa
7	Zhemchuzhina-Sochi, Arsenal Tula, Fakel Voronezh, Khimki, **Orenburg**
6	Spartak Nalchik, **Sochi**
5	Tekstilshchik Kamyshin, KAMAZ Naberezhnye Chelny, Uralan Elista, Tyumen, **Baltika Kaliningrad**, **Nizhny Novgorod**
4	Luch Vladivostok
3	Dynamo Stavropol, Volga Nizhny Novgorod, Mordovia Saransk
2	Okean Nakhodka, Asmaral Moscow, Sokol Saratov, Lada-Tolyatti, Tambov, **Akron Tolyatti**, **Dynamo Makhachkala**
1	Sibir Novosibirsk, Tosno, SKA-Khabarovsk, Yenisey Krasnoyarsk

== All-time table ==
As of the end of the 2021–22 season. Teams in bold compete in 2024–25 Premier League.

Rank	Club^{1}	Seasons	Spells	Most recent season	Played^{2}	Won	Drawn	Lost	Goals	Points^{3}	Gold	Silver	Bronze	Notes
1	**Spartak Moscow**	30	1		893	470	204	189	1551-917	1670	10	5	4	
2	**CSKA Moscow**	30	1		893	449	202	212	1288-816	1607	6	8	3	
3	**Lokomotiv Moscow**	30	1		893	424	240	199	1262-810	1572	3	6	6	
4	**Zenit Saint Petersburg**	27	2		802	395	210	167	1448-783	1247	7	3	4	
5	**Dynamo Moscow**	29	2		862	339	240	253	1152-956	1297	-	1	4	
6	**Krylya Sovetov Samara**	27	4		806	249	218	339	851–1057	965	-	-	1	
7	**Rostov**	28	3		832	242	230	330	865–1067	993	-	1	-	
8	**Rubin Kazan**	19	1		554	215	153	156	654–525	836	2	-	2	
9	Torpedo Moscow	16	2	2014–15	492	188	142	162	625–598	706	-	-	1	
10	Alania Vladikavkaz	16	3	2012–13	489	179	109	201	630–663	646	1	2	-	Disbanded 2020
11	Rotor Volgograd	14	2	2020-21	432	156	116	160	577–558	584	-	2	1	
12	Amkar Perm	14	1	2017–18	434	114	131	159	368–478	508	-	-	-	
13	Saturn Moscow Oblast	12	1	2010	360	120	121	119	396–378	481	-	-	-	
14	**Akhmat Grozny**	12	2		344	102	77	135	322–404	422 ^{4}	-	-	-	
15	Ural Sverdlovsk Oblast	11	2	2023-24	308	93	58	127	337–421	374	-	-	-	
16	**Krasnodar**	8	1		224	88	54	52	295–213	372	-	-	1	
17	Anzhi Makhachkala	11	3		314	86	83	115	299–353	365	-	-	1	Disbanded 2022
18	Moscow	9	1	2009	270	92	83	95	295–311	359	-	-	-	Disbanded 2010
19	Shinnik Yaroslavl	10	4	2008	304	85	86	133	294–403	341	-	-	-	
21	Tom Tomsk	9	2	2016–17	284	75	77	132	259–395	302	-	-	-	Dissolved 2022
22	Chernomorets Novorossiysk	8	2	2003	248	74	65	109	274–357	287	-	-	-	
24	Zhemchuzhina Sochi	7	1	1999	222	61	57	104	263–390	240	-	-	-	Disbanded 2003 and 2013, reestablished 2007
25	Spartak Nalchik	6	1	2011–12	194	54	57	83	207–239	219	-	-	-	
26	Energia-Tekstilshchik Kamyshin	5	1	1996	158	53	43	62	172–177	202	-	-	-	
27	KAMAZ Naberezhnye Chelny	5	1	1997	162	51	32	79	198–253	179 ^{5}	-	-	-	
28	Uralan Elista	5	2	2003	150	36	39	75	138–225	147	-	-	-	Disbanded 2005, reestablished 2014
29	Ufa	4	1		90	25	26	39	73–108	144	-	-	-	
30	Luch-Energia Vladivostok	4	2	2008	124	34	32	58	116–187	134	-	-	-	
31	Baltika Kaliningrad	3	1	2023-24	98	30	37	31	114–111	127	-	-	-	
32	**Fakel Voronezh**	4	3		124	31	29	64	101–175	122	-	-	-	
33	Dynamo Stavropol	3	1	1994	94	27	23	44	94–125	104	-	-	-	Disbanded 2014, re-established 2015
34	Tyumen	5	3	1998	154	25	26	103	116–326	101	-	-	-	
35	Arsenal Tula	3	2		60	14	11	35	38–86	95	-	-	-	
36	Volga Nizhny Novgorod	3	1	2013–14	104	25	16	63	87–171	91	-	-	-	Disbanded 2016
37	Mordovia Saransk	3	2	2015–16	90	20	22	48	82–150	82	-	-	-	
38	Okean Nakhodka	2	1	1993	64	22	14	28	65–83	80	-	-	-	Disbanded 2015, reestablished 2018
39	**Khimki**	3	1		90	17	23	50	86–151	74	-	-	-	
40	Asmaral Moscow	2	1	1993	60	19	11	30	74–102	68	-	-	-	Disbanded 1999
41	Sokol Saratov	2	1	2002	60	17	13	30	55–87	64	-	-	-	
42	Lada Togliatti	2	2	1996	64	10	16	38	42–105	46	-	-	-	
43	**Orenburg**	2	2		30	7	9	14	25–36	30	-	-	-	
44	Tosno	1	1	2017–18	30	6	6	18	23–54	24	-	-	-	Disbanded 2018
46	SKA-Khabarovsk	1	1	2017–18	30	2	7	21	16–55	13	-	-	-	
47	Yenisey Krasnoyarsk	1	1	2018-19	30	4	8	18	24-55	20	-	-	-	

Competing in RPL
Competing in RFL (2nd tier)
Competing in PFLA (3rd tier)
Competing in PFLB (4th tier)
Competing in amateur leagues (below 4th tier)
Defunct (see notes)

Notes

1. For clubs that have been renamed, their name at the time of their most recent season in the Russian League is given. The current members are listed **in bold**.
2. Includes championship play-offs, does not include relegation play-offs.
3. For the purposes of this table, each win is worth 3 points. The three-point system was adopted in 1995.
4. Terek were deducted 6 points in 2005.
5. KAMAZ-Chally were deducted 6 points in 1997.

== Player records ==
=== Most appearances ===
As of 17 May 2026

Rank	Player	Apps
1	(Russia) Igor Akinfeev	615
2	(Russia) Sergei Ignashevich	489
3	(Russia) Artem Dzyuba	470
4	(Russia) Sergei Semak	456
5	(Russia) Dmitri Loskov	453
6	(Russia) Igor Semshov	433
7	(Russia) Oleg Ivanov	412
8	(Russia) Vasili Berezutski	402
9	(Russia) Ruslan Adzhindzhal	397
10	(Russia) Igor Lebedenko	394

=== Most goals ===
As of 3 May 2026

Rank	Player	Goals	Apps	Avg/Game
1	(Russia) Artem Dzyuba	178	470	0.38
2	(Russia) Oleg Veretennikov	143	274	0.52
3	(Russia) Aleksandr Kerzhakov	139	340	0.41
4	(Russia) Dmitri Kirichenko	129	377	0.34
5	(Russia) Dmitri Loskov	120	453	0.26
6	(Russia) Fedor Smolov	109	339	0.33
7	(Russia) Roman Pavlyuchenko	104	309	0.34
8	(Russia) Sergei Semak	102	456	0.22
9	(Russia) Andrey Tikhonov	98	346	0.28
10	(Russia) Igor Semshov	98	433	0.23

=== Champions (players) ===
9-time

- (Russia) Dmitri Ananko (1992–94), (1996–01)

== Media coverage ==
=== 2020–21 and 2021–22 ===
==== Russia and CIS ====
Channel	Summary	Ref
Match TV	60 matches per season live	
Match Premier	All 240 matches live	

==== Worldwide ====
All 240 matches are aired live globally on YouTube with a required subscription. There will be two membership levels for the viewers outside Russia, CIS, and China. The first level includes two matches with English commentary each matchday and will cost a monthly fee of $2.99. The second level, for $4.99 a month, gives subscribers access to all eight matches in Russian and two matches with English commentary as well. In 2018–19 season, YouTube broadcast four live matches per week for free (in matchweek 30, aired all last eight matches). From 2020 to 2021, YouTube also broadcast the FTA coverage of Super Cup before airing the league.

Country/Region	Broadcaster
Southeast Europe: Bosnia and Herzegovina; Croatia; Montenegro; North Macedonia; Serbia; Slovenia	Arena Sport
Belarus	Belarus 5
Brazil	Grupo Bandeirantes; Xsports; Gol Brasil
CIS: Kazakhstan; Kyrgyzstan	Qsport
Hong Kong	i-cable
Latin America	Gol TV

== See also ==
- Football in Russia
- Russian Cup
- Soviet Top League
- List of attendance figures at domestic professional sports leagues
- List of foreign Russian Premier League players
