= Franc Artiga =

Spanish football coach

Personal information
- Full name: Franc Artiga Cebrián
- Date of birth: 30 July 1976 (age 50)
- Place of birth: Cambrils, Spain

Managerial career
- Years: Team
- 2003: Reus (youth)
- 2003–2005: Amposta (assistant)
- 2005–2007: Gimnàstic (youth)
- 2009–2010: Amposta
- 2010–2021: Barcelona (youth)
- 2021–2022: United Arab Emirates U20
- 2023: Rodina-2 Moscow
- 2023–2024: Rodina Moscow
- 2024–2025: Khimki
- 2025–2026: Petro Luanda
- 2026: Rubin Kazan

Francesc "Franc" Artiga Cebrián (born 30 July 1976) is a Spanish football manager.

== Career ==
Artiga worked at La Masia, the youth academy of Barcelona for more than ten years, and managed the clubs's under-19 squad in the 2019–20 UEFA Youth League. Barcelona finished last in their Youth League group. In the same season, the team was declared national champions after the 2019–20 División de Honor Juvenil de Fútbol was abandoned due to the COVID-19 pandemic in Spain.

On 28 June 2024, Artiga was hired by Khimki, after the club returned to Russian Premier League. He left the club by mutual consent on 15 April 2025.

On 23 June 2025, Artiga was appointed manager of Girabola side Petro Luanda.

On 14 January 2026, Artiga returned to Russian Premier League and signed a one-and-a-half-season contract with Rubin Kazan. He was dismissed by Rubin on 24 October 2026.
