= Komus (company) =

Russian chain store and manufacturing company

- Company type: Private
- Industry: Retailing and wholesale
- Founded: 1990
- Headquarters: Moscow, Russia
- Key people: Sergey Bobrikov, General Director
- Products: Office supplies, plastic package, medical consumables, printing services
- Revenue: ▲$591 million USD (2006)
- Number of employees: 4200 (2007)
- Website: www.komus.ru

Komus (Russian: Ко́мус) is a Russian chain store and manufacturing company. It supplies goods for office and school, office furniture and equipment, paper and paperboard, plastic package, medical consumables and provides printing services. Its headquarters are in Moscow.

== History ==
Komus was established in 1990 as a students' cooperative. The company's name represents an abbreviation from Russian коммерческие услуги (translit. kommercheskie uslugi) meaning commercial services.

== Ownership ==
The main owner of the company is its General Director Sergey Bobrikov (96%).

== Slogan ==
The company's slogan is Komus Only! Confidence Since Childhood!

== Business activity ==
The company has a network of stores in Russia supplying products for office and school use - over 70 stores in 17 regions of Russia.
