= Nizhnekamskneftekhim =

Petrochemnical plant in Nizhnekamsk, Russia

- Type: Public
- Traded as: MCX: NKNC
- Industry: Petrochemicals
- Founded: 31 July 1967
- Headquarters: Nizhnekamsk
- Products: Plastic; Synthetic rubber Petrochemicals; Petrochemical feedstocks
- Revenue: $2.87 billion (2017)
- Operating income: $461 million (2016)
- Net income: $363 million (2016)
- Total assets: $1.97 billion (2016)
- Total equity: $1.63 billion (2016)
- Number of employees: ~ 20,000
- Website: https://www.sibur.ru/nknh/en/

Nizhnekamskneftekhim (Russian: Нижнекамскнефтехим, IPA: [nʲɪʐnʲɪkəmsknʲɪftʲɪˈxʲim]), abbreviated NKNK, is a large petrochemical company and largest specialized company in Europe headquartered in the city of Nizhnekamsk, Russia.

It is the largest producer of synthetic rubber and plastics in Russia. The company was established in 1967, and employs over 17,000 people.

In 2022 the company's revenue amounted to 257 billion rubles. On 12 June 2026, the NKNK synthetic rubber plant was attacked by Ukrainian drones with a "large fire" breaking out.

== Owners and management ==
Since 2023 the company's CEO has been Marat Inilovich Falyakhov.
