= Kazanorgsintez =

Russian chemical company

- Company type: Public joint stock company
- Traded as: MCX: KZOS
- Industry: Chemical industry
- Founded: 1950s
- Headquarters: Kazan
- Products: Chemical products
- Revenue: $1.24 billion (2017)
- Operating income: $324 million (2017)
- Net income: $258 million (2017)
- Total assets: $1.13 billion (2017)
- Total equity: $94 million (2017)
- Number of employees: about 8,300 (in 2009)
- Website: www.kazanorgsintez.ru/en

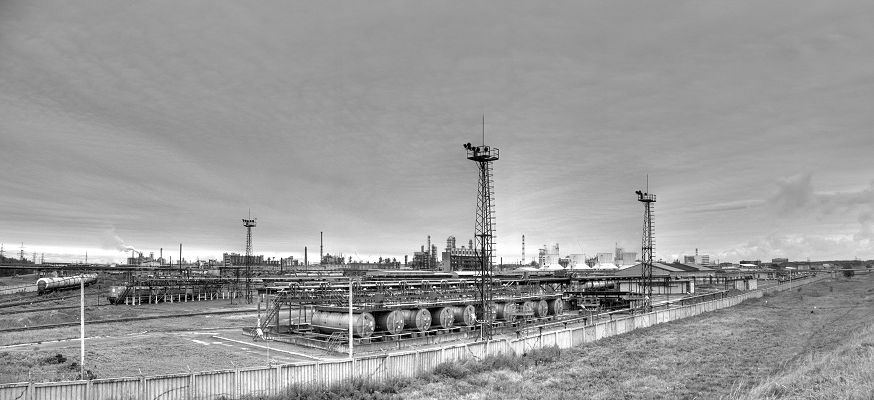
a view of Kazanorgsintez in 2007

PJSC Kazanorgsintez (Russian: ПАО «Казаньоргси́нтез») is one of Russia's largest chemical companies and the country's largest polyethylene producer. It is based in Kazan, Tatarstan.

The company produces a range of organic chemistry products including ethylene, polyethylene, ethylene oxide, phenol, acetone, and polyethylene pipes. Kazanorgsintez also offers glycols, ethanolamines, cooling liquids, and textile agents and products for primary preparation of oil–corrosion and paraffin deposits inhibitors, proxanols-proxamines, and demulsifiers. About 25% of the company's production was exported to other countries.

== History ==
The company was founded in the 1950s under the government of the Soviet Union as Kazan Chemical Plant. Production began in 1959.

As of 2009 Kazanorgsintez had approximately 8,300 employees and its stock was listed in the Russian trading system.

Investment company Svyazinvestneftekhim was a shareholder in Kazanorgsintez as of 2016. In 2016, Svyazinvestneftekhim transferred a 16.09 percent stake in Kazanorgsintez to AK BARS Bank to increase its capitalization.

On 14 January 2025, during the Russo-Ukrainian War, Ukraine launched a drone attack on the Kazan Orgsintez chemical plant in Tatarstan, about 1,000 km (620 mi) from the border with Ukraine, causing a series of explosions and fires in three liquified natural gas (LNG) storage tanks. Russian sources acknowledged the attack.

== Ownership and management ==
Safin Airat Foatovich was CEO in June 2024.

Share ownership:

- 64% - "Sibur"
- 19.87% - the Government of the Republic of Tatarstan through its Svyazinvestneftekhim company
- The rest of the shares are in free circulation on the Moscow Exchange
