= 2023–24 Russian Premier League =

32nd season of top-tier football league in Russia

Russian Premier League
- Season: 2023–24
- Dates: 21 July 2023 – 25 May 2024
- Champions: Zenit
- Relegated: Baltika; Sochi; Ural Yekaterinburg
- Matches: 240
- Goals: 637 (2.65 per match)
- Top goalscorer: Mateo Cassierra (21 goals)
- Biggest home win: Sochi 6–1 Pari NN; 12 May 2024
- Biggest away win: Akhmat 1–7 Baltika; 13 April 2024
- Highest scoring: Akhmat 1–7 Baltika; 13 April 2024; Pari NN 2–6 CSKA; 20 May 2024
- Longest winning run: 6 matches Dynamo
- Longest unbeaten run: 12 matches Krasnodar
- Longest winless run: 10 matches Pari NN; Sochi; Ural
- Longest losing run: 6 matches Pari NN; Sochi
- Highest attendance: 57,858; Zenit 0–0 Spartak; 2 March 2024
- Lowest attendance: 1,968; Sochi 1–1 Orenburg; 10 December 2023
- Total attendance: 2,678,879
- Average attendance: 11,162

The 2023–24 Russian Premier League (known as the Mir Russian Premier League, also written as Mir Russian Premier Liga for sponsorship reasons) was the 32nd season of the premier football competition in Russia since the dissolution of the Soviet Union and the 22nd under the current Russian Premier League name.

== Teams ==
As in the previous season, 16 teams played in the 2023–24 season. After the 2022–23 season, Khimki and Torpedo Moscow were both relegated to the 2023–24 Russian First League. They were replaced by Rubin Kazan and Baltika Kaliningrad.

=== Venues ===
Zenit Saint Petersburg	Ural Yekaterinburg	Rubin Kazan	Rostov
Krestovsky Stadium	Central Stadium	Ak Bars Arena	Rostov Arena
Capacity: 67,800	Capacity: 35,696	Capacity: 45,093	Capacity: 45,000
Spartak Moscow	Locations of teams in the 2023–24 Russian Premier League Locations of teams in the 2023–24 Russian Premier League in Moscow		Krylia Sovetov Samara
Lukoil Arena	Locations of teams in the 2023–24 Russian Premier League Locations of teams in the 2023–24 Russian Premier League in Moscow		Solidarnost Arena
Capacity: 44,307	Locations of teams in the 2023–24 Russian Premier League Locations of teams in the 2023–24 Russian Premier League in Moscow		Capacity: 44,918
Krasnodar	Locations of teams in the 2023–24 Russian Premier League Locations of teams in the 2023–24 Russian Premier League in Moscow		Akhmat Grozny
Krasnodar Stadium	Locations of teams in the 2023–24 Russian Premier League Locations of teams in the 2023–24 Russian Premier League in Moscow		Akhmat-Arena
Capacity: 34,291	Locations of teams in the 2023–24 Russian Premier League Locations of teams in the 2023–24 Russian Premier League in Moscow		Capacity: 30,597
CSKA Moscow	Locations of teams in the 2023–24 Russian Premier League Locations of teams in the 2023–24 Russian Premier League in Moscow		Lokomotiv Moscow
VEB Arena	Locations of teams in the 2023–24 Russian Premier League Locations of teams in the 2023–24 Russian Premier League in Moscow		RZD Arena
Capacity: 30,457	Locations of teams in the 2023–24 Russian Premier League Locations of teams in the 2023–24 Russian Premier League in Moscow		Capacity: 27,320
Sochi	Locations of teams in the 2023–24 Russian Premier League Locations of teams in the 2023–24 Russian Premier League in Moscow		Pari Nizhny Novgorod
Fisht Olympic Stadium	Locations of teams in the 2023–24 Russian Premier League Locations of teams in the 2023–24 Russian Premier League in Moscow		Nizhny Novgorod Stadium
Capacity: 47,659	Locations of teams in the 2023–24 Russian Premier League Locations of teams in the 2023–24 Russian Premier League in Moscow		Capacity: 44,899
Fakel Voronezh	Dynamo Moscow	Orenburg	Baltika Kaliningrad
Tsentralnyi Profsoyuz Stadion	VTB Arena	Gazovik Stadium	Kaliningrad Stadium
Capacity: 31,793	Capacity: 26,319	Capacity: 10,046	Capacity: 35,016

=== Personnel and kits ===
Team	Location	Head coach	Captain	Kit manufacturer	Shirt sponsor
Akhmat	Grozny	(Russia) Magomed Adiyev	(Russia) Rizvan Utsiyev	(Spain) Joma	TBA
Baltika	Kaliningrad	(Russia) Sergei Ignashevich	(Russia) Yan Kazayev		Melbet; Rostec
CSKA	Moscow	(Russia) Vladimir Fedotov	(Russia) Igor Akinfeev		Wildberries
Dynamo	Moscow	(Czech Republic) Marcel Lička	(Paraguay) Fabián Balbuena	(Germany) Puma	BetBoom
Fakel Voronezh	Voronezh	(Tajikistan) Igor Cherevchenko	(Russia) Irakli Kvekveskiri	(Spain) Kelme	EkoNiva
Krasnodar	Krasnodar	(Russia) Murad Musayev	(Russia) Matvei Safonov		Winline
Krylia Sovetov	Samara	(Russia) Igor Osinkin	(Russia) Aleksandr Soldatenkov	(Germany) Puma	Fonbet
Lokomotiv	Moscow	(Russia) Mikhail Galaktionov	(Russia) Dmitri Barinov		RZD
Orenburg	Orenburg	(Spain) David Deogracia	(Russia) Andrei Malykh	(Germany) Adidas	TBA
Pari Nizhny Novgorod	Nizhny Novgorod	(Serbia) Saša Ilić	(Russia) Kirill Gotsuk	(Germany) Jako	PARI
Rostov	Rostov-on-Don	(Russia) Valery Karpin	(Russia) Danil Glebov	(Germany) Puma	Fonbet; TNS energo; Samolet
Rubin	Kazan	(Tajikistan) Rashid Rakhimov	(Belarus) Alyaksandr Martynovich	(Germany) Jako	Kazan Orgsintez
Sochi	Sochi	(Spain) Robert Moreno	(Slovenia) Vanja Drkušić	(Germany) Puma	Liga Stavok
Spartak	Moscow	Vacant	(Russia) Georgi Dzhikiya		Lukoil
Ural	Yekaterinburg	(Russia) Yevgeni Averyanov (caretaker)	(Ukraine) Denys Kulakov	(Spain) Kelme	BetBoom; TMK
Zenit	Saint Petersburg	(Russia) Sergei Semak	(Brazil) Douglas Santos	(Spain) Joma	Gazprom

=== Managerial changes ===
Team	Outgoing manager	Manner of departure	Date of vacancy	Position in table	Replaced by	Date of appointment
Dynamo Moscow	(Russia) Pavel Alpatov (caretaker)	Moved to Dynamo-2 Moscow	22 June 2023	Pre-season	(Czech Republic) Marcel Lička	22 June 2023
Orenburg	(Czech Republic) Marcel Lička	Signed by Dynamo Moscow	22 June 2023	Pre-season	(Czech Republic) Jiří Jarošík	22 June 2023
Akhmat Grozny	(Russia) Sergei Tashuyev	Mutual consent	15 August 2023	12th	(Russia) Isa Baytiyev (caretaker)	15 August 2023
Akhmat Grozny	(Russia) Isa Baytiyev (caretaker)	End of caretaker spell	18 August 2023	12th	(Belarus) Miroslav Romaschenko	18 August 2023
Orenburg	(Czech Republic) Jiří Jarošík	Mutual consent	22 August 2023	16th	(Spain) David Deogracia	22 August 2023
Fakel Voronezh	(Russia) Vadim Yevseyev	Sacked	5 September 2023	15th	(Russia) Sergei Tashuyev	8 September 2023
Sochi	(Russia) Dmitri Khokhlov	Mutual consent	17 September 2023	13th	(Russia) Aleksandr Tochilin	17 September 2023
Sochi	(Russia) Aleksandr Tochilin	Sacked	3 December 2023	16th	(Russia) Denis Klyuyev (caretaker)	3 December 2023
Sochi	(Russia) Denis Klyuyev (caretaker)	End of caretaker spell	15 December 2023	16th	(Spain) Robert Moreno	15 December 2023
Krasnodar	(Serbia) Vladimir Ivić	Sacked	13 March 2024	2nd	(Russia) Murad Musayev	14 March 2024
Akhmat Grozny	(Belarus) Miroslav Romaschenko	Resigned	4 April 2024	12th	(Russia) Magomed Adiyev	5 April 2024
Spartak Moscow	(Spain) Guille Abascal	Sacked	14 April 2024	6th	(Bosnia and Herzegovina) Vladimir Slišković (caretaker)	14 April 2024
Fakel Voronezh	(Russia) Sergei Tashuyev	Resigned	26 April 2024	11th	(Tajikistan) Igor Cherevchenko	26 April 2024
Pari Nizhny Novgorod	(Russia) Sergei Yuran	Resigned	28 April 2024	11th	(Russia) Anton Khazov (caretaker)	28 April 2024
Pari Nizhny Novgorod	(Russia) Anton Khazov (caretaker)	Caretaking spell over	4 May 2024	11th	(Serbia) Saša Ilić	4 May 2024
Ural Yekaterinburg	(Belarus) Viktor Goncharenko	Sacked	30 May 2024	Relegation play-offs	(Russia) Yevgeni Averyanov (caretaker)	30 May 2024

== Tournament format and regulations ==
The 16 teams play a round-robin tournament whereby each team plays each one of the other teams twice, once at home and once away, for a total of 240 matches with each team playing 30.

The season started on 21 July. The last games before the winter break were played on 10 December; the spring part of the season began on 1 March and the last games will be played on 25 May.

=== Promotion and relegation ===
For the purpose of determining First League positions for the following season, the teams that do not pass 2024–25 RPL licensing or drop out of 2024–25 season for any other reason, or the second teams of RPL clubs, or the teams that finished lower than 6th place in First League standings will not be considered. For example, if the teams that finished 1st, 3rd and 4th in the First League standings failed licensing, the team that finished 2nd would be considered the 1st-placed team, the team that finished 5th will be considered the 2nd-placed team, and the team that finished 6th will be considered the 3rd-placed team. There would be no designated 4th-placed team in this scenario.

The teams that finish 15th and 16th will be relegated to the 2024–25 First League, while the top two in that league will be promoted to the Premier League for the 2024–25 season.

The 13th and 14th Premier League teams will play the 4th and 3rd 2023–24 First League teams respectively in two (home-and-away) playoff games, with penalty shootout in effect if necessary. The winners will secure Premier League spots for the 2024–25 season. If both of the teams that finish RPL in 13th and 14th place fail licensing for the 2024–25 season or drop out for any other reason, play-offs will not be held, and the 3rd and 4th First League teams will be promoted automatically. If one of the teams that place 13th and 14th in the Premier League fails licensing for 2024–25 season or drops out for other reasons, 3rd First League team will be promoted automatically and the 13th or 14th-placed team that passes licensing will play 4th First League team in playoffs, with the winners securing the Premier League spot. If only one First League team is eligible for the play-offs (as in the example scenario above), that team will play the 14th-placed RPL team in playoffs, with the winners securing the Premier League spot, and the 13th RPL team will remain in the league. If none of the First League teams are eligible for the play-offs, they will not be held and 13th and 14th-placed RPL teams will remain in the league. If any of the teams are unable to participate in the season after the play-offs have been concluded, or there are not enough teams that pass licensing to follow the above procedures, the replacement will be chosen by the Russian Football Union in consultation with RPL and FNL.

Russian Football Union announced their initial 2024–25 licensing decision on 17 May 2024, with two games left to play in the Premier League and the First League. All the 2023–24 Premier League teams, and four out of the top 5 First League teams (Khimki, Dynamo Makhachkala, Akron Tolyatti and Rodina Moscow) were issued the license. 4th-placed First League club Arsenal Tula was denied the license. Shinnik Yaroslavl, which could finish in the Top 5 First League position, did not apply for the license. The final decision would be released on 23 May 2024, Arsenal could file an appeal for the denial before then.

On 20 May 2024, Dynamo Makhachkala and Khimki secured the top two spots in the First League and the direct promotion.

On 22 May 2024, Russian Football Union held a draw which determined that the first leg of the relegation play-offs will be hosted by the RPL teams. The games will be played on 29 May 2024 and 1 June 2024. In case Baltika Kaliningrad qualified for the play-offs, the games in Baltika's match-up would be played on 6 June 2024 and 9 June 2024, as Baltika qualified for the 2023–24 Russian Cup superfinal, to be played on 2 June 2024.

On 23 May 2024, RFU announced that Arsenal's appeal was successful and they will be issued a conditional RPL license and participate in the play-offs.

=== Exclusion from the league ===
Any team can be excluded from the Premier League during the season for the following reasons: a) using counterfeit documents or providing inaccurate information to the league; b) not arriving to the game on more than one occasion; c) match fixing. Such a team is automatically relegated and is not replaced during the season, and only one additional team (that gains the fewest points at the end of the season) is directly relegated. If the excluded team had played fewer than 15 games at the time of exclusion, all its results would be annulled and would not count for the standings. If the excluded team had played at least 15 games at the time of exclusion, all their remaining opponents would be awarded a victory without effect on their goal difference.

== Season events ==
=== Issues related to the Russian invasion of Ukraine ===
On 22 May 2023, FIFA extended their ruling that allowed foreign players in Russia to unilaterally suspend their contracts with their clubs and sign with a club outside of Russia until 30 June 2024. However, this option was only available to the players whose contract was already suspended under these regulations at the end of the 2022–23 season. The players who joined a Russian club after these regulations were originally introduced in March 2022, or players who played in Russia in the 2022–23 season (including those who originally suspended their contract in the 2021–22 season and then returned), were not able to use this condition in the 2023–24 season.

Players who suspended their contracts

- (Sweden) Pontus Almqvist - Rostov
- (Nigeria) Chidera Ejuke - CSKA Moscow
- (Bosnia and Herzegovina) Armin Gigović - Rostov
- (Bosnia and Herzegovina) Dennis Hadžikadunić - Rostov
- (Czech Republic) Alex Král - Spartak Moscow
- (Ukraine) Ivan Ordets - Dynamo Moscow
- (Iceland) Arnór Sigurðsson - CSKA Moscow
- (The Gambia) Ali Sowe - Rostov

=== Last match day ===
For the first time since the 2015–16 season, the champion was determined on the last match day on 25 May 2024, with all the games played simultaneously with common kick-off time of 16:30 Moscow Time. It was also the first time since the 2013–14 season when three teams still had the chance to become champions on the last match day. Dynamo Moscow entered the day with 56 points, Zenit St. Petersburg (which won the title in 5 preceding seasons) had 54 and Krasnodar 53. Krasnodar hosted Dynamo and Zenit played Rostov at home. Head-to-head results are the first tiebreaker in case the teams are tied on points, Dynamo had head-to-head advantage over Zenit and Krasnodar would have had advantage over Dynamo in case Krasnodar beat them. Therefore, Dynamo would have won the title if they beat Krasnodar or draw, Zenit would have won the title if they beat Rostov and Krasnodar beat Dynamo, and Krasnodar would have won it if they beat Dynamo and Zenit did not beat Rostov.

A goal by Krasnodar's Jhon Córdoba in the 32nd minute was called off for offside after a VAR review and both games were scoreless at half-time (if those results stood, Dynamo would have won the title). Córdoba put Krasnodar ahead in the 52nd minute, as Rostov's Ronaldo scored in the 54th minute to put Zenit down 0–1 (Krasnodar would have won the title with those results). Zenit's Gustavo Mantuan equalized in the 65th minute from a penalty kick awarded for handball after another VAR review (those results still would have favoured Krasnodar). Zenit's goal by Mateo Cassierra in the 72nd minute was called off for offside. Two shots by Dynamo's Luis Chávez and Roberto Fernández in the 80th and 82nd minute respectively hit Krasnodar's goalpost. Zenit's late substitute Artur put Zenit ahead 2–1 in the 85th minute with a long kick after a mistake by Rostov's goalkeeper Sergei Pesyakov, establishing the final score and earning Zenit their sixth consecutive title, as Krasnodar game ended with the 1–0 score.

== League table ==
Pos	Team	Pld	W	D	L	GF	GA	GD	Pts	Qualification or relegation
1	Zenit Saint Petersburg (C)	30	17	6	7	52	27	+25	57	
2	Krasnodar	30	16	8	6	45	29	+16	56 (Note: Krasnodar is ahead of Dynamo on head-to-head points: Krasnodar 6, Dynamo 0)	
3	Dynamo Moscow	30	16	8	6	53	39	+14	56	
4	Lokomotiv Moscow	30	14	11	5	52	38	+14	53	
5	Spartak Moscow	30	14	8	8	41	32	+9	50	
6	CSKA Moscow	30	12	12	6	56	40	+16	48	
7	Rostov	30	12	7	11	43	46	−3	43	
8	Rubin Kazan	30	11	9	10	31	38	−7	42	
9	Krylia Sovetov Samara	30	11	8	11	46	44	+2	41	
10	Akhmat Grozny	30	10	5	15	33	45	−12	35	
11	Fakel Voronezh	30	7	11	12	22	31	−9	32	
12	Orenburg	30	7	10	13	34	41	−7	31	
13	Pari Nizhny Novgorod (O)	30	8	6	16	29	51	−22	30 (Note: Pari NN is ahead of Ural on head-to-head points: Pari NN 4, Ural 1.)	Qualification to relegation play-offs
14	Ural Yekaterinburg (R)	30	7	9	14	30	46	−16	30	Qualification to relegation play-offs
15	Baltika Kaliningrad (R)	30	7	5	18	33	42	−9	26	Relegation to First League
16	Sochi (R)	30	5	9	16	37	48	−11	24	Relegation to First League

Source: Premier Liga
Rules for classification: 1) Points; 2) Head-to-head points; 3) Head-to-head matches won; 4) Head-to-head goal difference; 5) Head-to-head goals scored; 6) Matches won; 7) Goal difference; 8) Goals scored; 9) 2022–23 position (not applicable to final standings); 10) Play-off. Note: if teams tied on points played an equal number of head-to-head games, head-to-head results are considered in aggregate, in a separate 'table'. If teams tied on points played a different number of head-to-head games, head-to-head criteria are considered in one-on-one pairs for each team against each other, then the teams are ordered by the number of one-on-one matchups they have advantage in.
(C) Champions; (O) Play-off winners; (R) Relegated

== Relegation play-offs ==
The draw to determine the hosts in each leg was held on 22 May 2024. The kick-off times were set on 26 May 2024. The referees were assigned on 28 May 2024.

=== First leg ===
29 May 2024
17:00 (19:00 YEKT)

Ural Yekaterinburg	0–2	Akron Tolyatti
Goncharenko (yellow card) 44'; Begić (yellow card) 67'	Report	Savichev (yellow card) 51'; Anđelković 67'; Danilin 72'

Yekaterinburg Arena, Yekaterinburg
Attendance: 13,511
Referee: Vasily Kazartsev

29 May 2024
19:15

Pari Nizhny Novgorod	1–2	Arsenal Tula
Botaka 8' (o.g.); Kalinsky (yellow card) 17'; Gotsuk (yellow card) 20'; Kakkoyev (yellow card) 80'	Report	Kaynov 2'; Botaka (yellow card) 27' (goal) 33'; Shevchenko (yellow card) 48'; Storozhuk (yellow card) 58'

Nizhny Novgorod Stadium, Nizhny Novgorod
Attendance: 14,339
Referee: Kirill Levnikov

=== Second leg ===
1 June 2024
15:00 (16:00 SAMT)

Akron Tolyatti	1–2	Ural Yekaterinburg
Ponce 47'; Bart (yellow card) 56'; Makarov (yellow card) 60'; Kilin (yellow card) 67'; Anđelković (yellow card) 70'; Paliyenko (yellow card) 87'; Volkov (yellow card) 90+5'; Pesegov (yellow card) 90+9'	Report	Begić 74', 79'

Kristall Stadium, Zhigulevsk
Attendance: 2,827
Referee: Vladislav Bezborodov

Akron Tolyatti won 3–2 on aggregate and was promoted to the Russian Premier League, Ural Yekaterinburg was relegated to the First League.

1 June 2024
18:00

Arsenal Tula	0–2	Pari Nizhny Novgorod
Popov (yellow card) 48'	Report	Bozhenov 18'; Botaka 58' (o.g.); Shnaptsev (yellow card) 85'; Ilić (yellow card) 86'

Arsenal Stadium, Tula
Attendance: 4,997
Referee: Pavel Kukuyan

Pari Nizhny Novgorod won 3–2 on aggregate and retained their Russian Premier League spot, Arsenal Tula remained in the First League.

== Results ==
Home \ Away	AKH	BAL	CSK	DYN	FAK	KRA	KRY	LOK	ORE	PNN	ROS	RUB	SOC	SPA	URA	ZEN
Akhmat Grozny	—	1–7	2–3	1–1	1–2	1–1	1–2	0–2	4–0	5–1	0–0	0–1	1–0	2–1	1–0	1–5
Baltika Kaliningrad	1–0	—	3–1	2–3	2–1	2–2	2–1	1–3	1–0	2–0	2–2	0–1	0–0	0–2	0–1	0–2
CSKA Moscow	1–2	1–0	—	2–3	4–1	1–0	2–2	4–1	1–1	3–2	2–0	2–2	3–1	0–0	2–0	1–1
Dynamo Moscow	2–0	2–0	2–1	—	0–0	1–3	4–1	2–1	2–0	1–1	1–4	1–0	3–2	1–2	2–1	1–0
Fakel Voronezh	2–0	0–0	1–1	1–1	—	0–0	0–1	1–4	0–0	2–0	0–1	0–1	2–0	2–0	0–0	1–1
Krasnodar	0–1	3–2	1–0	1–0	2–0	—	2–1	1–1	2–1	1–0	3–2	1–1	2–0	2–0	2–0	1–2
Krylia Sovetov Samara	0–2	2–1	0–2	3–3	3–0	0–0	—	3–3	1–1	1–1	5–1	2–0	2–1	4–0	3–1	1–1
Lokomotiv Moscow	2–1	3–2	3–3	0–0	2–0	1–1	1–1	—	0–2	1–0	1–0	2–2	2–2	1–1	2–0	3–1
Orenburg	1–1	1–0	1–1	1–2	1–2	0–2	2–1	0–2	—	3–1	1–1	3–0	3–0	0–0	0–2	3–1
Pari Nizhny Novgorod	2–0	0–0	2–6	1–4	1–1	3–4	2–0	2–3	3–1	—	1–0	2–1	1–0	0–0	1–0	0–2
Rostov	3–0	2–1	3–3	1–2	2–1	2–1	2–0	1–0	2–1	1–0	—	3–0	2–2	1–5	2–2	1–1
Rubin Kazan	2–1	1–0	0–0	2–2	1–0	0–2	2–1	1–1	1–1	0–1	3–1	—	1–1	1–4	1–1	0–3
Sochi	1–2	2–0	2–2	3–3	0–0	2–3	0–2	0–1	1–1	6–1	4–0	0–2	—	1–0	2–2	0–2
Spartak Moscow	0–0	2–1	2–2	1–0	0–2	1–0	3–0	3–2	3–2	2–0	2–1	3–1	1–0	—	0–0	1–3
Ural Yekaterinburg	0–1	2–1	2–1	2–1	0–0	3–1	1–2	2–2	3–3	0–0	0–1	0–1	1–4	3–2	—	1–4
Zenit Saint Petersburg	2–1	1–0	0–1	2–3	2–0	1–1	3–1	1–2	1–0	1–0	2–1	0–2	3–0	0–0	4–0	—

Updated to match(es) played on 25 May 2024. Source: Russian Premier League
Legend: Blue = home team win; Yellow = draw; Red = away team win.
For upcoming matches, an "a" indicates there is an article about the rivalry between the two participants.

== Season statistics ==
=== Top goalscorers ===
Rank	Player	Club	Goals
1	(Colombia) Mateo Cassierra	Zenit St. Petersburg	21
2	(Russia) Konstantin Tyukavin	Dynamo Moscow	15
2	(Colombia) Jhon Córdoba	Krasnodar	15
4	(Russia) Fyodor Chalov	CSKA Moscow	12
5	(Burkina Faso) Mohamed Konaté	Akhmat Grozny	11
5	(Armenia) Eduard Spertsyan	Krasnodar	11
7	(Albania) Mirlind Daku	Rubin Kazan	10
8	(Russia) Anton Zabolotny	CSKA Moscow	9
8	(Argentina) Benjamín Garré	Krylia Sovetov Samara	9
8	(Russia) Yevgeni Markov	Fakel Voronezh	9

=== Hat-tricks ===
Player	For	Against	Result	Date	Ref
(Russia) Fyodor Chalov	CSKA Moscow	Akhmat Grozny	3–2 (A)	30 July 2023	
(Brazil) Alex Fernandes	Baltika Kaliningrad	Akhmat Grozny	7–1 (A)	13 April 2024	
(Colombia) Mateo Cassierra^{5}	Zenit St. Petersburg	Akhmat Grozny	5–1 (A)	19 May 2024	

- ^{5} Player scored 5 goals

=== Clean sheets ===
Rank	Player	Club	Clean sheets
1	(Russia) Matvei Safonov	Krasnodar	11
2	(Russia) Aleksandr Belenov	Fakel Voronezh	10
2	(Russia) Aleksandr Maksimenko	Spartak Moscow	10
4	(Russia) Yury Dyupin	Rubin Kazan	9
4	(Russia) Artur Nigmatullin	Pari Nizhny Novgorod	9
6	(Russia) Mikhail Kerzhakov	Zenit St. Petersburg	8
6	(Russia) Ilya Lantratov	Lokomotiv Moscow	8
6	(Russia) Giorgi Sheliya	Akhmat Grozny	8
9	(Russia) Igor Akinfeev	CSKA Moscow	7
10	(Russia) Sergei Pesyakov	Rostov	6
10	(Russia) Ilya Pomazun	Ural Yekaterinburg	6
10	(Russia) Nikolai Sysuyev	Orenburg	6

Notes

- Aleksandr Selikhov and Aleksandr Maksimenko each played a half in Spartak's 1–0 win over Dynamo Moscow on 23 September 2023.
- Giorgi Sheliya and Mikhail Oparin each played a half in Akhmat's 0–0 draw with Rostov on 9 December 2023.

== Awards ==
=== Monthly awards ===
Month	Player of the Month		Manager of the Month		Goal of the Month		Ref.
Month	Player	Club	Manager	Club	Player	Club	Ref.
July/August	(Argentina) Benjamín Garré	Krylia Sovetov Samara	(Serbia) Vladimir Ivić	Krasnodar	(Russia) Dmitri Skopintsev	Dynamo Moscow	
September	(Argentina) Braian Mansilla	Orenburg	(Serbia) Vladimir Ivić	Krasnodar	(Georgia (country)) Nikoloz Kutateladze	Pari Nizhny Novgorod	
October	(Armenia) Eduard Spertsyan	Krasnodar	(Russia) Sergei Tashuyev	Fakel Voronezh	(Russia) Ilya Ishkov	Ural Yekaterinburg	
November/December	(Russia) Konstantin Tyukavin	Dynamo Moscow	(Tajikistan) Rashid Rakhimov	Rubin Kazan	(Chile) Víctor Dávila	CSKA Moscow	
March	(Iran) Mohammad Mohebi	Rostov	(Russia) Valery Karpin	Rostov	(Argentina) Matías Pérez	Orenburg	
April	(Russia) Konstantin Tyukavin	Dynamo Moscow	(Bosnia and Herzegovina) Vladimir Slišković	Spartak Moscow	(Armenia) Eduard Spertsyan	Krasnodar	

=== Annual awards ===
==== Winline-Heroes of the RPL Awards ====
Awarded by the league.

Award	Winner	Club
Player of the Season	(Russia) Konstantin Tyukavin	Dynamo Moscow
Discovery of the Season	(Uzbekistan) Abbosbek Fayzullaev	CSKA Moscow
Goalkeeper of the Season	(Russia) Matvei Safonov	Krasnodar
Defender of the Season	(Brazil) Douglas Santos	Zenit St. Petersburg
Midfielder of the Season	(Armenia) Eduard Spertsyan	Krasnodar
Forward of the Season	(Russia) Konstantin Tyukavin	Dynamo Moscow
Manager of the Season	(Czech Republic) Marcel Lička	Dynamo Moscow
Goal of the Season	(Russia) Konstantin Tyukavin	Dynamo Moscow
Assist of the Season	(Russia) Fyodor Chalov	CSKA Moscow
Young Player of the Season	(Russia) Nikita Saltykov	Krylia Sovetov Samara
Top Scorer of the Season	(Colombia) Mateo Cassierra (21 goals)	Zenit St. Petersburg
Most Assists	(Russia) Maksim Glushenkov (16 assists)	Lokomotiv Moscow

Team of the Year
Goalkeeper	(Russia) Matvey Safonov (Krasnodar)			
Defenders	(Russia) Sergey Volkov (Krasnodar)	(Brazil) Willyan Rocha (CSKA Moscow)	(Paraguay) Júnior Alonso (Krasnodar)	(Brazil) Douglas Santos (Zenit Saint Petersburg)
Midfielders	(Russia) Maksim Glushenkov (Lokomotiv Moscow)		(Colombia) Wilmar Barrios (Zenit Saint Petersburg)	(Brazil) Wendel (Zenit Saint Petersburg)
Forwards	(Iran) Mohammad Mohebi (Rostov)		(Colombia) Mateo Cassierra (Zenit Saint Petersburg)	(Russia) Konstantin Tyukavin (Dynamo Moscow)

== Attendances ==
FC Zenit drew the highest average home attendance in the 2023-24 edition of the Russian Premier League.

#	Football club	Home games	Average attendance
1	FC Zenit	15	28,156
2	FC Krasnodar	15	23,617
3	FC Spartak Moscow	15	15,752
4	FC Rostov	15	12,769
5	Fakel Voronezh	15	11,772
6	Baltika Kaliningrad	15	11,241
7	FC Dynamo Moscow	15	11,131
8	PFC CSKA Moscow	15	9,570
9	FC Ural	15	9,078
10	Krylia Sovetov	15	8,813
11	FC Lokomotiv Moscow	15	8,323
12	FC Nizhny Novgorod	15	7,977
13	Rubin Kazan	15	6,957
14	FC Sochi	15	5,260
15	Akhmat Grozny	15	4,858
16	FC Orenburg	15	4,054
