= 2022–23 Russian Premier League =

31st season of top-tier football league in Russia

Russian Premier League
- Season: 2022–23
- Dates: 15 July 2022 – 3 June 2023
- Champions: Zenit
- Relegated: Khimki; Torpedo
- Matches: 240
- Goals: 730 (3.04 per match)
- Top goalscorer: Malcom (23 goals)
- Biggest home win: Zenit 8–0 Orenburg; 11 September 2022
- Biggest away win: Khimki 0–6 Krasnodar; 2 April 2023
- Highest scoring: Zenit 8–0 Orenburg; 11 September 2022
- Longest winning run: 7 matches Zenit
- Longest unbeaten run: 15 matches Zenit
- Longest winless run: 11 matches Khimki
- Longest losing run: 8 matches Torpedo
- Highest attendance: 51,174; Zenit 2–1 CSKA; 13 August 2022
- Lowest attendance: 207; Torpedo 0–1 Ural; 11 March 2023
- Total attendance: 2,262,312
- Average attendance: 9,426
- All statistics correct as of 3 June 2023.

The 2022–23 Russian Premier League (known as the Mir Russian Premier League, also written as Mir Russian Premier Liga for sponsorship reasons) was the 31st season of the premier football competition in Russia since the dissolution of the Soviet Union and the 21st under the current Russian Premier League name.

== Teams ==
As in the previous season, 16 teams played in the 2022–23 season. After the 2021–22 season, Arsenal Tula, Rubin Kazan and Ufa were all relegated to the 2022–23 Russian Football National League. They were replaced by Torpedo Moscow, Fakel Voronezh and Orenburg. FC Nizhny Novgorod was renamed to FC Pari Nizhny Novgorod for sponsorship reason.

=== Venues ===
Zenit Saint Petersburg	Ural Yekaterinburg	Khimki	Rostov
Krestovsky Stadium	Central Stadium	Arena Khimki	Rostov Arena
Capacity: 67,800	Capacity: 35,696	Capacity: 18,636	Capacity: 45,000
Spartak Moscow	Locations of teams in the 2022–23 Russian Premier League Locations of teams in the 2022–23 Russian Premier League in Moscow		Krylia Sovetov Samara
Otkritie Arena	Locations of teams in the 2022–23 Russian Premier League Locations of teams in the 2022–23 Russian Premier League in Moscow		Solidarnost Arena
Capacity: 44,307	Locations of teams in the 2022–23 Russian Premier League Locations of teams in the 2022–23 Russian Premier League in Moscow		Capacity: 44,918
Krasnodar	Locations of teams in the 2022–23 Russian Premier League Locations of teams in the 2022–23 Russian Premier League in Moscow		Akhmat Grozny
Krasnodar Stadium	Locations of teams in the 2022–23 Russian Premier League Locations of teams in the 2022–23 Russian Premier League in Moscow		Akhmat-Arena
Capacity: 34,291	Locations of teams in the 2022–23 Russian Premier League Locations of teams in the 2022–23 Russian Premier League in Moscow		Capacity: 30,597
CSKA Moscow	Locations of teams in the 2022–23 Russian Premier League Locations of teams in the 2022–23 Russian Premier League in Moscow		Lokomotiv Moscow
VEB Arena	Locations of teams in the 2022–23 Russian Premier League Locations of teams in the 2022–23 Russian Premier League in Moscow		RZD Arena
Capacity: 30,457	Locations of teams in the 2022–23 Russian Premier League Locations of teams in the 2022–23 Russian Premier League in Moscow		Capacity: 27,320
Sochi	Locations of teams in the 2022–23 Russian Premier League Locations of teams in the 2022–23 Russian Premier League in Moscow		Pari Nizhny Novgorod
Fisht Olympic Stadium	Locations of teams in the 2022–23 Russian Premier League Locations of teams in the 2022–23 Russian Premier League in Moscow		Nizhny Novgorod Stadium
Capacity: 47,659	Locations of teams in the 2022–23 Russian Premier League Locations of teams in the 2022–23 Russian Premier League in Moscow		Capacity: 44,899
Fakel Voronezh	Dynamo Moscow	Orenburg	Torpedo Moscow
Tsentralnyi Profsoyuz Stadion	VTB Arena	Gazovik Stadium	Luzhniki Stadium (set to change)
Capacity: 31,793	Capacity: 26,319	Capacity: 10,046	Capacity: 81,000

=== Personnel and kits ===
Team	Location	Head coach	Captain	Kit manufacturer	Shirt sponsor
Akhmat	Grozny	(Russia) Sergei Tashuyev	(Russia) Rizvan Utsiyev	(Spain) Joma	Akhmat Foundation
CSKA	Moscow	(Russia) Vladimir Fedotov	(Russia) Igor Akinfeev	(Spain) Joma	X-Holding Wildberries Fonbet
Dynamo	Moscow	(Russia) Pavel Alpatov (caretaker)	(Russia) Daniil Fomin	(Germany) Puma	BetBoom
Fakel Voronezh	Voronezh	(Russia) Vadim Evseev	(Russia) Ruslan Magal	(Germany) Puma	Olimpbet
Khimki	Khimki	(Russia) Andrei Talalaev	(Russia) Butta Magomedov	(Germany) Puma	Fonbet Samolet
Krasnodar	Krasnodar	(Serbia) Vladimir Ivić	(Russia) Matvei Safonov	(Germany) Puma	Winline
Krylia Sovetov	Samara	(Russia) Igor Osinkin	(Russia) Aleksandr Soldatenkov	(Germany) Puma	Fonbet
Lokomotiv	Moscow	(Russia) Mikhail Galaktionov	(Russia) Dmitri Barinov	(Germany) Adidas	RZhD
Orenburg	Orenburg	(Czech Republic) Marcel Lička	(Russia) Andrei Malykh	(Germany) Adidas	
Pari Nizhny Novgorod	Nizhny Novgorod	(Russia) Sergei Yuran	(Russia) Kirill Gotsuk	(Germany) Jako	Pari
Rostov	Rostov-on-Don	(Russia) Valery Karpin	(Russia) Danil Glebov	(Germany) Puma	TNS Energo BetBoom
Sochi	Sochi	(Russia) Dmitri Khokhlov (caretaker)	(Russia) Soslan Dzhanayev	(Germany) Puma	
Spartak	Moscow	(Spain) Guille Abascal	(Russia) Georgi Dzhikiya	(United States) Nike	Lukoil
Torpedo Moscow	Moscow	(Spain) Pep Clotet	(Russia) Aleksandr Ryazantsev	(Germany) Puma	Pari
Ural	Yekaterinburg	(Belarus) Viktor Goncharenko	(Romania) Eric Bicfalvi	(United States) Nike	TMK BetBoom
Zenit	Saint Petersburg	(Russia) Sergei Semak	(Brazil) Douglas Santos	(Spain) Joma	Gazprom

=== Managerial changes ===
Team	Outgoing manager	Manner of departure	Date of vacancy	Position in table	Replaced by	Date of appointment	Position in table
CSKA Moscow	(Russia) Aleksei Berezutski	Mutual consent	15 June 2022	Off-season	(Russia) Vladimir Fedotov	15 June 2022	Off-season
Dynamo Moscow	(Germany) Sandro Schwarz	Resigned	29 May 2022	Off-season	(Serbia) Slaviša Jokanović	17 June 2022	Off-season
Pari Nizhny Novgorod	(Russia) Aleksandr Kerzhakov	Mutual consent	16 June 2022	Off-season	(Russia) Mikhail Galaktionov	16 June 2022	Off-season
Sochi	(Russia) Vladimir Fedotov	Signed by CSKA Moscow	15 June 2022	Off-season	(Russia) Vadim Garanin	20 June 2022	Off-season
Spartak Moscow	(Italy) Paolo Vanoli	Resigned	9 June 2022	Off-season	(Spain) Guille Abascal	10 June 2022	Off-season
Lokomotiv Moscow	(Russia) Zaur Khapov	Moved to coaching staff	30 June 2022	Off-season	(Germany) Josef Zinnbauer	30 June 2022	Off-season
Ural Yekaterinburg	(Russia) Igor Shalimov	Sacked	8 August 2022	16th	(Russia) Yevgeni Averyanov (caretaker)	8 August 2022	16th
Khimki	(Russia) Sergei Yuran	Mutual consent	10 August 2022	7th	(Russia) Nikolai Pisarev	10 August 2022	7th
Ural Yekaterinburg	(Russia) Yevgeni Averyanov (caretaker)	Caretaking spell over	15 August 2022	16th	(Belarus) Viktor Goncharenko	15 August 2022	16th
Torpedo Moscow	(Russia) Aleksandr Borodyuk	Mutual consent	18 August 2022	15th	(Russia) Nikolai Kovardayev	18 August 2022	16th
Khimki	(Russia) Nikolai Pisarev	Sacked	2 September 2022	11th	(Russia) Spartak Gogniyev	2 September 2022	11th
Fakel Voronezh	(Russia) Oleg Vasilenko	Mutual consent	6 September 2022	14th	(Russia) Dmitri Pyatibratov	6 September 2022 (caretaker); 18 September 2022 (permanent)	14th 14th
Akhmat Grozny	(Russia) Andrei Talalaev	Sacked	11 September 2022	9th	(Latvia) Yury Nagaytsev (caretaker)	11 September 2022	9th
Akhmat Grozny	(Latvia) Yury Nagaytsev (caretaker)	Caretaking spell over	22 September 2022	8th	(Russia) Sergei Tashuyev	22 September 2022	8th
Lokomotiv Moscow	(Germany) Josef Zinnbauer	Sacked	8 October 2022	14th	(Uzbekistan) Andrei Fyodorov (caretaker)	13 October 2022	14th
Torpedo Moscow	(Russia) Nikolai Kovardayev	Return to FC Torpedo-2	13 October 2022	16th	(Russia) Andrei Talalaev	13 October 2022	16th
Pari NN	(Russia) Mikhail Galaktionov	Resigned	11 November 2022	11th	(Russia) Anton Khazov (caretaker)	11 November 2022	11th
Lokomotiv Moscow	(Uzbekistan) Andrei Fyodorov (caretaker)	Caretaking spell over	13 November 2022	14th	(Russia) Mikhail Galaktionov	13 November 2022	14th
Sochi	(Russia) Vadim Garanin	Sacked	25 December 2022	9th	(Turkmenistan) Kurban Berdyev	25 December 2022	9th
Pari NN	(Russia) Anton Khazov (caretaker)	Caretaking spell over	31 December 2022	12th	(Russia) Artyom Gorlov	31 December 2022	12th
Krasnodar	(Russia) Aleksandr Storozhuk	Moved to Krasnodar-2	4 January 2023	8th	(Serbia) Vladimir Ivić	4 January 2023	8th
Torpedo Moscow	(Russia) Andrei Talalaev	Mutual consent	22 March 2023	16th	(Spain) Pep Clotet	28 March 2023	16th
Khimki	(Russia) Spartak Gogniyev	Mutual consent	3 April 2023	15th	(Russia) Rinat Bilyaletdinov (caretaker)	3 April 2023	15th
Pari Nizhny Novgorod	(Russia) Artyom Gorlov	Mutual consent	4 April 2023	13th	(Russia) Sergei Yuran	4 April 2023	13th
Sochi	(Turkmenistan) Kurban Berdyev	Sacked	10 April 2023	9th	(Russia) Dmitri Khokhlov (caretaker)	10 April 2023	9th
Khimki	(Russia) Rinat Bilyaletdinov (caretaker)	Caretaking spell over	11 April 2023	15th	(Russia) Andrei Talalaev	11 April 2023	15th
Fakel Voronezh	(Russia) Dmitri Pyatibratov	Mutual consent	30 April 2023	14th	(Russia) Vadim Evseev	1 May 2023	14th
Dynamo Moscow	(Serbia) Slaviša Jokanović	Sacked	14 May 2023	7th	(Russia) Pavel Alpatov (caretaker)	15 May 2023	7th

== Tournament format and regulations ==
The 16 teams play a round-robin tournament whereby each team plays each one of the other teams twice, once at home and once away. Thus, a total of 240 matches played, with 30 matches played by each team.

The season started 15 July, with the first half of the season ending on 13 November, allowing for the 2022 FIFA World Cup. The second half of the season began the weekend of 4–5 March with the final round of matches scheduled for 3 June 2023.

=== Promotion and relegation ===
For the purpose of determining First League positions for the following, the teams that will not pass 2023–24 RPL licensing or drop out of 2023–24 season for any other reason, or the second teams of RPL clubs (such as FC Krasnodar-2), or the teams that finished lower than 6th place in First League standings will not be considered. For example, if the teams that finished 1st, 3rd and 4th in the First League standings fail licensing, the team that finished 2nd will be considered 1st-placed team, the team that finished 5th will be considered 2nd-placed team and the team that finished 6th will be considered 3rd-placed team. There will be no designated 4th-placed team in this scenario.

The teams that finish 15th and 16th will be relegated to the 2023–24 First League, while the top 2 in that league will be promoted to the Premier League for the 2023–24 season.

The 13th and 14th Premier League teams will play the 4th and 3rd 2022–23 First League teams respectively in two (home-and-away) playoff games, with penalty shootout in effect, if necessary (away goals rule for these games has been abolished beginning from this season), the winners will secure Premier League spots for the 2023–24 season. If both of the teams that finish RPL in 13th and 14th place fail licensing for the 2023–24 season or drop out for any other reason, play-offs will not be held, and 3rd and 4th First League teams will be promoted automatically. If one of the teams that place 13th and 14th in the Premier League fails licensing for 2023–24 season or drops out for other reasons, 3rd First League team will be promoted automatically and the 13th or 14th-placed team that passes licensing will play 4th First League team in playoffs, with the winners securing the Premier League spot. If only one First League team is eligible for the play-offs (as in the example scenario above), that team will play the 14th-placed RPL team in playoffs, with the winners securing the Premier League spot, and the 13th RPL team will remain in the league. If none of the First League teams are eligible for the play-offs, they will not be held and 13th and 14th-placed RPL teams will remain in the league. If any of the teams are unable to participate in the season after the play-offs have been concluded, or there are not enough teams that pass licensing to follow the above procedures, the replacement will be chosen by the Russian Football Union in consultation with RPL and FNL.

Russian Football Union announced their initial licensing decision for the 2023–24 season on 23 May 2023. Rubin Kazan and Baltika Kaliningrad, which secured the top two First League spots at that time, were licensed for the RPL and will receive a direct promotion. Out of the teams that could potentially finish in a Top 6 First League spot at that time (with two games remaining in the season), 3rd-placed Alania, Volgar, Arsenal Tula and SKA-Khabarovsk were all denied the RPL license, those clubs could appeal that decision. Some other teams who could finish in the Top 6, like Dynamo Makhachkala, which was 6th in the standings at the time, did not apply for the RPL license at all. Yenisey Krasnoyarsk and Rodina Moscow were the only teams out of the potential Top-6 finishers to receive the license. On 27 May 2023, Yenisey secured 4th-place finish and participation in the promotion play-offs. Rodina secured 5th First League spot and participated in the play-offs in the 4th-placed team spot. Alania's appeal was denied on 29 May 2023 (the appeal by Volgar was successful, but that was moot as Rodina secured a higher table position than Volgar by that time).

=== Exclusion from the league ===
Any team can be excluded from the Premier League during the season for the following reasons: a) using counterfeit documents or providing inaccurate information to the league; b) not arriving to the game on more than one occasion; c) match fixing. Such a team is automatically relegated and is not replaced during the season, and only one additional team (that gains the fewest points at the end of the season) is directly relegated. If the excluded team plays fewer than 15 games at the time of exclusion, all its results would be annulled and will not count for the standings. If the excluded team plays at least 15 games at the time of exclusion, all their remaining opponents are awarded a victory, without effect on their goal difference.

== Season events ==
=== Issues related to the Russian invasion of Ukraine ===
On 21 June 2022, FIFA extended their ruling that would allow foreign players in Russia to unilaterally suspend their contracts with their clubs, and sign with a club outside of Russia until 30 June 2023.

Players who suspended their contracts

- (Belarus) Ilya Shkurin - CSKA Moscow
- (Nigeria) Chidera Ejuke - CSKA Moscow
- (Iceland) Arnór Sigurðsson - CSKA Moscow
- (Paraguay) Fabián Balbuena - Dynamo Moscow
- (Ukraine) Ivan Ordets - Dynamo Moscow
- (Sweden) Filip Dagerstål - Khimki
- (Sweden) Pontus Almqvist - Rostov
- (Czech Republic) Alex Král - Spartak Moscow

=== Fan ID introduction and related issues ===
A new mandatory government-issued electronic identification document officially called "fan card" (Russian: Карта болельщика) and colloquially referred to as "Fan ID" was introduced before the season. Similar ID cards were used during the 2018 FIFA World Cup and Russia-hosted UEFA Euro 2020 games. The ID is a QR code issued after an application online and a visit to a government office to confirm identity. The ID was mandatory from the beginning of the season to attend games at the home stadiums of PFC Sochi, FC Rostov, FC Ural Yekaterinburg, PFC Krylia Sovetov Samara and FC Pari Nizhny Novgorod, and was expanded for all the remaining stadiums in December 2022. It would not be issued to fans who were banned from attending games by court due to committing violations at previous games such as launching firecrackers or fighting other fans.

In June 2022, Communist Party of the Russian Federation introduced a draft of a new law to reverse the introduction of Fan ID.

Ultras for most Premier League clubs (with the exception of FC Akhmat Grozny) boycotted the games in protest against Fan ID, considering it a privacy and rights violation. Ultras for FC Zenit Saint Petersburg boycotted the games where Fan ID was mandatory, but attended the games where it was not yet introduced.

Attendance was significantly lowered at the stadiums that introduced Fan ID. The August game between FC Ural Yekaterinburg and FC Spartak Moscow was attended by 8,931 people, while the attendance for the 2021–22 season game in May between the same teams was 26,402. A Russian Cup game between FC Rostov and FC Dynamo Moscow was attended by 28,931 people (Fan ID is not mandatory at Cup games except the final), and the previous Rostov league game against PFC CSKA Moscow only had 8,616 attendees. Overall, the average attendance at the games where Fan ID was mandatory was about half of overall average attendance. According to league's president Aleksandr Alayev, 315,000 people were issued Fan ID by late November. By late February, as the season was about to resume after the winter break, 450,000 people were issued Fan ID. In mid-March, the application procedure was adjusted so that it can be fully completed online, and a personal visit to the government office is no longer necessary (the identity is confirmed by scanning your biometric passport by a NFC-supporting smartphone). By early May, 850,000 people were issued Fan ID.

=== Pari NN–Torpedo game ===
In the game played on 19 March 2023 between FC Pari Nizhny Novgorod and FC Torpedo Moscow that ended in a 1–1 draw, Pari NN started Yaroslav Mikhaylov. Mikhaylov started the season with FC Zenit Saint Petersburg before moving on loan to Pari NN, and received a caution in two Russian Second League games for the reserve team FC Zenit-2 Saint Petersburg. He then received caution two more times in RPL games for Pari NN. According to RPL regulations, receiving four cautions leads to an automatic one-game disqualification, and cautions received in the current season in Russian First League or Russian Second League games count for the total, with the exception of the cautions received in games for the current club's reserve team (which Pari NN did not have at the time). The league allowed Mikhaylov to be fielded as their computer system that automatically tracks disqualifications only accounts for the cautions received in RPL games, and the clubs are responsible for tracking the lower-leagues cautions themselves. Torpedo announced that they will lodge a protest and will demand the game to be awarded to them. Russian Football Union awarded the game to Torpedo with the score of 3–0 on 22 March 2023.

== League table ==
Pos	Team	Pld	W	D	L	GF	GA	GD	Pts	Qualification or relegation
1	Zenit Saint Petersburg (C)	30	21	7	2	74	20	+54	70	
2	CSKA Moscow	30	17	7	6	56	27	+29	58	
3	Spartak Moscow	30	15	9	6	60	38	+22	54	
4	Rostov	30	15	8	7	48	44	+4	53	
5	Akhmat Grozny	30	15	5	10	51	39	+12	50	
6	Krasnodar	30	13	9	8	62	46	+16	48	
7	Orenburg	30	14	4	12	58	55	+3	46	
8	Lokomotiv Moscow	30	13	6	11	54	46	+8	45 (Note: Lokomotiv and Dynamo tied on head-to-head criteria. Overall goal difference: Lokomotiv +8, Dynamo +4.)	
9	Dynamo Moscow	30	13	6	11	49	45	+4	45	
10	Sochi	30	11	5	14	37	54	−17	38	
11	Ural Yekaterinburg	30	10	6	14	33	45	−12	36	
12	Krylia Sovetov Samara	30	8	8	14	32	45	−13	32	
13	Pari Nizhny Novgorod (O)	30	8	6	16	33	50	−17	30 (Note: Head-to-head points: Pari NN 3, Fakel 3. Head-to-head goal difference: Pari NN +1, Fakel -1.)	Qualification for the relegation play-offs
14	Fakel Voronezh (O)	30	6	12	12	36	48	−12	30	Qualification for the relegation play-offs
15	Khimki (R)	30	4	6	20	25	67	−42	18	Relegation to First League
16	Torpedo Moscow (R)	30	3	4	23	22	61	−39	13	Relegation to First League

Source: Premier Liga
Rules for classification: 1) Points; 2) Head-to-head points; 3) Head-to-head matches won; 4) Head-to-head goal difference; 5) Head-to-head goals scored; 6) Matches won; 7) Goal difference; 8) Goals scored; 9) 2021–22 position (not applicable to final standings); 10) Play-off.
(C) Champions; (O) Play-off winners; (R) Relegated

== Relegation play-offs ==
The draw to determine the hosts in each leg was held on 25 May 2023. The kick-off times were announced on 3 June 2023. The referees were assigned on 5 June 2023.

=== First leg ===
7 June 2023
15:00 UTC+3 (19:00 UTC+7)

Yenisey Krasnoyarsk (Note: Alania Vladikavkaz, Yenisey Krasnoyarsk and Rodina Moscow secured the 3rd, 4th and 5th position in the First League, respectively. However, Alania was denied the 2023–24 RPL license by the Russian Football Union and their appeal was denied on 29 May 2023. Yenisey was seeded as the 3rd-place team, and Rodina was seeded as the 4th-place team. For more detail, see the relevant section of this article)	0–1	Fakel Voronezh
Lanin (red card) 59'	Report	Markov 77'

Futbol-Arena Yenisey, Krasnoyarsk
Referee: Sergei Karasev

7 June 2023
18:00 UTC+3

Rodina Moscow	0–3	Pari Nizhny Novgorod
	Report	Sevikyan 11'; Yakovlev 57'; Sharipov 90+2'

Spartakovets Stadium, Moscow
Referee: Kirill Levnikov

=== Second leg ===
10 June 2023
14:30 UTC+3

Pari Nizhny Novgorod	0–2	Rodina Moscow
	Report	Timoshenko 8'; Kalmykov 24'

Nizhny Novgorod Stadium, Nizhny Novgorod
Referee: Vitali Meshkov

Pari Nizhny Novgorod won 3–2 on aggregate and retained their Russian Premier League spot, Rodina remained in the First League.

10 June 2023
17:30 UTC+3

Fakel Voronezh	2–0	Yenisey Krasnoyarsk
Akbashev 10' (pen.), 70'	Report

Tsentralnyi Profsoyuz Stadion, Voronezh
Referee: Sergey Ivanov

Fakel Voronezh won 3–0 on aggregate and retained their Russian Premier League spot, Yenisey remained in the First League.

== Results ==
Home \ Away	AKH	CSK	DYN	FAK	KHI	KRA	KRY	LOK	ORE	PNN	ROS	SOC	SPA	TOR	URA	ZEN
Akhmat Grozny	—	1–3	2–1	2–1	3–0	2–2	1–2	0–1	3–1	1–3	1–2	1–0	1–1	1–0	2–0	0–0
CSKA Moscow	4–2	—	1–1	4–1	3–0	4–1	4–0	1–1	2–1	0–1	4–1	3–0	2–2	3–0	2–0	1–0
Dynamo Moscow	0–3	2–1	—	0–2	6–1	0–0	1–0	2–4	3–2	3–1	1–1	0–2	1–0	4–0	2–1	0–2
Fakel Voronezh	1–1	0–2	3–3	—	1–1	3–3	2–1	2–0	1–3	1–0	1–1	3–0	1–4	2–2	0–0	1–1
Khimki	1–3	1–2	0–1	0–0	—	0–6	0–0	0–3	2–0	3–0	0–1	0–2	1–1	4–2	0–3	1–1
Krasnodar	2–3	0–0	3–1	2–2	3–1	—	2–1	3–0	2–0	3–1	3–0	2–1	1–4	2–2	1–1	0–1
Krylia Sovetov Samara	0–1	0–1	0–2	1–1	0–0	0–0	—	1–1	1–1	2–1	1–3	2–0	1–0	1–1	3–0	1–5
Lokomotiv Moscow	1–2	0–1	1–3	1–0	5–1	3–2	1–1	—	5–1	1–1	2–2	3–0	1–2	3–1	2–4	1–2
Orenburg	2–1	2–2	3–0	4–1	3–1	5–1	2–4	1–4	—	1–0	2–2	4–1	2–0	1–0	3–0	2–2
Pari Nizhny Novgorod	3–2	2–2	2–2	3–1	2–0	0–2	2–1	0–4	0–2	—	3–4	4–0	1–2	0–3	0–0	0–3
Rostov	3–2	0–0	2–1	0–2	1–0	3–2	2–1	1–3	2–1	2–1	—	2–2	4–2	2–1	1–2	0–0
Sochi	2–1	2–0	2–1	1–1	4–1	0–2	1–2	4–0	0–4	2–1	1–0	—	1–1	3–1	2–2	1–1
Spartak Moscow	0–0	2–1	3–3	3–2	5–0	4–3	5–2	1–0	4–1	0–0	1–1	3–0	—	1–0	2–2	1–2
Torpedo Moscow	1–5	1–0	0–3	2–0	1–3	1–4	0–2	0–1	1–3	0–0	0–1	1–3	1–2	—	0–1	0–2
Ural Yekaterinburg	1–2	1–2	0–1	2–0	2–1	1–3	2–1	2–2	2–1	0–1	1–3	1–0	0–2	2–0	—	0–4
Zenit Saint Petersburg	1–2	2–1	3–1	1–0	3–2	2–2	3–0	5–0	8–0	3–0	3–1	7–0	3–2	2–0	2–0	—

Updated to match(es) played on 3 June 2023. Source: Russian Premier League
Legend: Blue = home team win; Yellow = draw; Red = away team win.
For upcoming matches, an "a" indicates there is an article about the rivalry between the two participants.

== Season statistics ==
=== Top goalscorers ===
Rank	Player	Club	Goals
1	(Brazil) Malcom	Zenit St. Petersburg	23
2	(Netherlands) Quincy Promes	Spartak Moscow	20
3	(Russia) Fyodor Chalov	CSKA Moscow	19
4	(Colombia) Jhon Córdoba	Krasnodar	14
4	(Russia) Vladimir Pisarski (Sychevoy)	Orenburg; Krylia Sovetov Samara	14
6	(Russia) Aleksandr Sobolev	Spartak Moscow	13
7	(Burkina Faso) Mohamed Konaté	Akhmat Grozny	11
7	(Ecuador) Christian Noboa	Sochi	11
9	(Russia) Ivan Sergeyev	Zenit St. Petersburg	10
9	(Russia) Maksim Glushenkov	Krylia Sovetov Samara; Lokomotiv Moscow	10
9	(Russia) Nikolay Komlichenko	Rostov	10
9	(Russia) Timur Suleymanov	Pari Nizhny Novgorod	10
9	(Armenia) Eduard Spertsyan	Krasnodar	10
9	(Russia) Fyodor Smolov	Dynamo Moscow	10

=== Hat-tricks ===
Player	For	Against	Result	Date	Ref
(Russia) Vladimir Pisarsky	Orenburg	Ural Yekaterinburg	3–0 (H)	23 July 2022	
(Russia) Ivan Ignatyev	Lokomotiv	Orenburg	5–1 (H)	28 August 2022	
(Brazil) Wendel	Zenit	Orenburg	8–0 (H)	11 September 2022	
(Russia) Vladimir Pisarsky	Orenburg	Krasnodar	5–1 (H)	13 November 2022	
(Russia) Artem Dzyuba	Lokomotiv	Rostov	3–1 (A)	4 March 2023	
(Brazil) Malcom^{4}	Zenit	Krylia Sovetov	5–1 (A)	29 April 2023	

- ^{4} Player scored 4 goals

=== Clean sheets ===
Rank	Player	Club	Clean sheets
1	(Russia) Mikhail Kerzhakov	Zenit Saint Petersburg	12
2	(Russia) Igor Akinfeev	CSKA Moscow	10
3	(Russia) Giorgi Sheliya	Akhmat Grozny	8
4	(Russia) Ilya Lantratov	Khimki; Lokomotiv Moscow	7
4	(Russia) Matvei Safonov	Krasnodar	7
4	(Russia) Aleksandr Selikhov	Spartak Moscow	7
4	(Russia) Ilya Svinov	Fakel Voronezh	7
8	(Russia) Ilya Pomazun	Ural Yekaterinburg	6
8	(Russia) Anton Shunin	Dynamo Moscow	6
10	(Russia) Artur Nigmatullin	Pari Nizhny Novgorod	5
10	(Russia) Sergei Pesyakov	Rostov	5

Notes

Daniil Odoyevsky and Mikhail Kerzhakov both played in Zenit's 0–0 draw against Akhmat Grozny on 6 August 2022. Soslan Dzhanayev was sent off in the 25th minute of Sochi's 2–0 victory over Dynamo Moscow on 1 April 2023, with Denis Adamov playing the rest of the game. Yegor Baburin played in a 1–1 draw against Pari NN that was awarded to Torpedo on technicality after the fact with the score of 3–0, that game does not count for his clean sheets total. Ivan Lomayev and Yevgeny Frolov both played in Krylia Sovetov's 3–0 victory over Ural Yekaterinburg on 21 May 2023.

== Awards ==
=== Monthly awards ===
Month	Player of the Month		Manager of the Month		Goal of the Month		Ref.
Month	Player	Club	Manager	Club	Player	Club	Ref.
July	(Russia) Daniil Utkin	Rostov	(Russia) Vladimir Fedotov	CSKA Moscow	(Russia) Konstantin Maradishvili	Lokomotiv Moscow	
August	(Netherlands) Quincy Promes	Spartak Moscow	(Russia) Sergei Semak	Zenit St. Petersburg	(Russia) Artur Yusupov	Sochi	
September	(Russia) Aleksandr Sobolev	Spartak Moscow	(Russia) Valery Karpin	Rostov	(Russia) Denis Makarov	Dynamo Moscow	
October	(Russia) Vladimir Pisarsky	Orenburg	(Belarus) Viktor Goncharenko	Ural Yekaterinburg	(Russia) Anton Zinkovsky	Spartak Moscow	
November	(Russia) Danil Glebov	Rostov	(Russia) Valery Karpin	Rostov	(Russia) Danil Glebov	Rostov	
March	(Russia) Artem Dzyuba	Lokomotiv Moscow	(Russia) Mikhail Galaktionov	Lokomotiv Moscow	(Russia) Ruslan Litvinov	Spartak Moscow	
April	(Russia) Ivan Oblyakov	CSKA Moscow	(Russia) Vladimir Fedotov	CSKA Moscow	(Russia) Artem Dzyuba	Lokomotiv Moscow	

=== Annual awards ===
==== Winline-Heroes of the RPL Awards ====
Awarded by the league.

Award	Winner	Club
Player of the Season	(Brazil) Malcom	Zenit St. Petersburg
Manager of the Season	(Russia) Vladimir Fedotov	CSKA Moscow
Goalkeeper of the Season	(Russia) Igor Akinfeev	CSKA Moscow
Defender of the Season	(Brazil) Douglas Santos	Zenit St. Petersburg
Midfielder of the Season	(Armenia) Eduard Spertsyan	Krasnodar
Forward of the Season	(Brazil) Malcom	Zenit St. Petersburg
Goal of the Season	(Georgia (country)) Konstantin Maradishvili	Lokomotiv Moscow
Assist of the Season	(Russia) Igor Akinfeev	CSKA Moscow
Fans' Choices	(Netherlands) Quincy Promes	Spartak Moscow

Team of the Season
Goalkeeper	(Russia) Igor Akinfeev (CSKA Moscow)				
Defence	(Brazil) Moisés (CSKA Moscow)	(Russia) Maksim Osipenko (Rostov)	(Russia) Georgi Dzhikiya (Spartak Moscow)		(Brazil) Douglas Santos (Zenit St. Petersburg)
Midfield	(Brazil) Malcom (Zenit St. Petersburg)	(Brazil) Wendel (Zenit St. Petersburg)	(Armenia) Eduard Spertsyan (Krasnodar)	(Russia) Ruslan Litvinov (Spartak Moscow)	(Netherlands) Quincy Promes (Spartak Moscow)
Attack	(Russia) Fyodor Chalov (CSKA Moscow)				

SG

== Attendances ==
#	Football club	Home games	Average attendance
1	FC Zenit	15	31,236
2	FC Krasnodar	15	19,158
3	Fakel Voronezh	15	13,921
4	FC Dynamo Moscow	15	13,744
5	FC Spartak Moscow	15	10,912
6	PFC CSKA Moscow	15	9,116
7	FC Lokomotiv Moscow	15	7,693
8	FC Nizhny Novgorod	15	7,278
9	FC Rostov	15	7,219
10	FC Akhmat Grozny	15	6,633
11	Krylia Sovetov	15	6,229
12	FC Orenburg	15	4,878
13	FC Ural	15	4,851
14	FC Sochi	15	3,353
15	FC Torpedo Moscow	15	3,234
16	FC Khimki	15	1,932
