= Khovansky =

Khovansky (masculine), Khovanskaya (feminine), or Khovanskoye (neuter) may refer to:

- Khovansky (surname)
- Khovansky (inhabited locality) (Khovanskoye), name of several rural localities in Russia

== See also ==
- Khovanshchina, an opera by Modest Mussorgsky
- Khovanshchina (film), a 1960 film of the opera
