= Khovansky (surname) =

Khovansky, Khovanski or Khovanskiy (Russian: Хованский) is a Russian masculine surname, its feminine counterpart is Khovanskaya or Khovanskaia. It may refer to:

- Aleksey Khovansky (fencer) (born 1987), Russian foil fencer
- Aleksey Khovansky (publisher) (1814–1899), Russian philologist and publisher
- Askold Khovanskii (born 1947), Russian and Canadian mathematician
- Euphrosinia Andreyevna Khovanskaya
- Ivan Khovansky (disambiguation), several people
- Galina Khovanskaya
- Sergey Khovanskiy (born 1977), Russian sprint canoer
- Vyacheslav Khovanskiy (born 1968), Russian association football player
- Yury Khovansky (born 1990), Russian video blogger
