= Ivan Khovansky =

Ivan Khovansky may refer to:

- Ivan Andreyevich Khovansky (?–1621), Russian boyar and voyevoda
- Ivan Andreyevich Khovansky (Tararui) (?–1682), Russian boyar
- Ivan Ivanovich Khovansky (?– 1701), Russian boyar
- Ivan Nikitich Khovansky (?–1675), Russian boyar and voyevoda
