= Vyacheslav Khovanskiy =

Russian footballer

Personal information
- Full name: Vyacheslav Aleksandrovich Khovanskiy
- Date of birth: 3 December 1968 (age 57)
- Place of birth: Kamensk-Uralsky, Russian SFSR
- Height: 1.82 m (5 ft 11 1/2 in)
- Position: Forward

Youth career
- FC Trubnik Kamensk-Uralsky

Senior career*
Years	Team	Apps	(Gls)
1985–1989	FC Salyut Kamensk-Uralsky (amateur)		
1991–1992	FC Trubnik Kamensk-Uralsky (amateur)		
1992–1993	FC Uralmash Yekaterinburg	18	(4)
1993	FC Trubnik Kamensk-Uralsky (amateur)		
1994–1997	FC Trubnik Kamensk-Uralsky	103	(39)
1998–1999	FC Zenit Chelyabinsk	30	(1)
2001–2003	FC Sinara Kamensk-Uralsky		
2005	FC Trud Kataysk		
- * Club domestic league appearances and goals

Vyacheslav Aleksandrovich Khovanskiy (Russian: Вячеслав Александрович Хованский; born 3 December 1968) is a former Russian football player.
