= David Deogracia =

Spanish football coach

Personal information
- Full name: David Deogracia Márquez
- Date of birth: 21 February 1973 (age 53)
- Place of birth: Las Palmas, Spain

Managerial career
- Years: Team
- Huracán (youth)
- Las Palmas (youth)
- 2002–2003: Universidad LP B
- Vecindario B
- 2006–2007: Las Palmas (youth)
- 2007–2008: Huracán
- 2008–2009: Las Palmas B (assistant)
- 2009–2010: Unión Viera
- 2012–2014: Teror
- 2014: Surin City
- 2015–2017: Moghreb Tétouan (youth)
- 2017–2021: Dynamo Brest (youth)
- 2022: Shakhtyor Soligorsk (youth)
- 2023: Orenburg (youth)
- 2023–2024: Orenburg

David Deogracia Márquez (born 21 February 1973) is a Spanish football coach.

== Club career ==
Born in Las Palmas, Canary Islands, Deogracia began his managerial career in charge of AD Huracán's Juvenil team. He subsequently worked in the Cadete squad of UD Las Palmas before leading Universidad de Las Palmas CF's reserves to a first-ever promotion to Tercera División in 2003.

Deogracia subsequently worked at UD Vecindario's reserves and back in the youth sides of the UD before returning to Huracán and leading the club back to the fourth tier. He was later an assistant of Juani at UD Las Palmas Atlético before being in charge of CF Unión Viera, where he was sacked after not lining up a player ordered by the club's sporting director.

Deogracia was in charge of UD Teror Balompié for two seasons before departing the club on 10 March 2014, joining Thai side Buriram United FC and being named manager of Surin City FC, the club's reserve team. On 21 July 2015, he joined compatriot Sergio Lobera at MA Tétouan, being manager of their under-21 team.

In 2017, Deogracia switched teams and countries again after joining the under-17 team of FC Dynamo Brest. He was later in charge of the under-21 squad of FC Shakhtyor Soligorsk.

On 15 March 2023, Deogracia was hired to head the academy of the Russian Premier League club FC Orenburg. After Orenburg's weak start to the 2023–24 Russian Premier League season, their manager Jiří Jarošík left the club by mutual consent and Deogracia was appointed manager.

On 3 June 2024, Deogracia's contract was extended as Orenburg avoided relegation. He was dismissed by Orenburg on 3 October 2024, following a 14-game winless run.
