= Ivan Ivanovich Khovansky =

Russian noble (died 1701)

Ivan Ivanovich Khovansky (Russian: Иван Иванович Хованский; died March 15, 1701) was a Russian boyar (noble) and the son of Ivan Nikitich Khovansky, an opponent of Peter the Great's reforms.

== Life ==
The name of Ivan Ivanovich Khovansky was first mentioned among the royal court stolniks in 1664. In 1676, he was appointed room stolnik (Russian: комнатный стольник) of Tsar Feodor III of Russia. In 1682, Ivan Khovansky was granted the title of a boyar (which he would be stripped of later, but then regain). In 1700, Ivan Khovansky became involved in the case of a preacher and copyist named Grigory Talitsky, who would identify Peter the Great with the Antichrist (The Legend about Peter I the Anvichrist). Before the case was over, Ivan Ivanovich Khovansky died under guard on March 15, 1701.

== Sources ==
- "Хованский, Иван Никитич" . Brockhaus and Efron Encyclopedic Dictionary (in Russian). 1906.
- Чулков, Н. (1901). "Хованский, Иван Иванович Большой". Русский биографический словарь. Т. 21: Фабер — Цявловский,. p. 379.
