= Novgorod uprising of 1650 =

Food riot in Novgorod, Russia

The Novgorod uprising of 1650 (Russian: Новгородское восстание 1650 года) was an uprising in Novgorod, caused by the Russian government's bulk purchasing of grain (traded to Sweden) and the resulting increases in the price of bread.

== Background ==
As part of the 1617 Peace of Stolbovo, Sweden gained territory in Muscovy from the Russians. In 1649 Russia agreed to compensate Sweden for Russian fugitives who had illegally settled in this territory. Fedor Emel’ianov, a Pskov merchant was tasked by the Russian government in gathering rye, which was part of the compensation. Poor harvests had already led to an increase in the price of rye, and Emel’ianov's bulk purchasing rose prices even higher. With Rye reaching fifty-two rubbles per chetvert at the time. Grain would be collected from different cities and towns throughout Russia. Novgorod was one of the largest commercial cities located in the north-west of Russia.

== Uprising ==
Evert Krabbe, a Danish envoy suspected of being a Swedish agent, arrived in Novgorod on March 15th, 1650 to collect grain for the payment to Sweden. His arrival brought frustrations to a head as the people of Novgorod, including musketeers from the garrison, began the uprising. The revolting craftsmen, some of the Streltsy, and urban poor deposed voyevoda Fyodor Khilkov, confined the governors to their homes, and looted the homes of wealthy merchants. The insurgents elected a number of city elders and put a metropolitan clerk named Ivan Zheglov in charge of municipal government.

On March 17, Metropolitan Nikon of Novgorod anathemized the new municipal authority from a church ambon, for which he would be beaten up by the crowd on March 19th. Tsar Alexei Mikhailovich dispatched a noble named Solovtsov to settle the conflict, but the latter was arrested on the spot and kept under guard for several days.

While the uprising was taking place, rumors were being spread by the Streltsy and Cossacks guards at the border. These rumors were fueled by the belief that the Swedish would take food and money, supplying it to other Germanic lands. There were allegations that rioters in Novgorod had formed an alliance with the rioters is Pskov.

The insurgents attempted to establish contact with rebellious Pskov, but to no avail. Eventually, the internal struggle for power between the urban poor and well-off citizens, Ivan Zheglov's hesitation and inconsistency, and Metropolitan Nikon's firm stance led to the insurgents' defeat. Ultimately, Moscow sent Prince Ivan Nikitich Khovanskii to quell the uprising in Novgorod and other cities that were also rioting. The government troops under the command of Khovanskii approached Novgorod in early April. After having spent a few days at the city walls, Khovanskii entered the city on April 13th meeting no resistance, with Novgorod surrendering on April 13th, 1650.

== Aftermath ==
In the aftermath of the uprising there was significant property damage and some reported murders. Moscow was unhappy with the people of Novgorod for believing the rumors spread by the Cossacks and Streltsy.

Surety bonds were issued for the majority of the Novgorodian rebels. The leaders of the uprising were arrested, five of whom would soon be executed. Over a hundred people were flogged and exiled to the Russian North, Astrakhan, and Terek. The instigators of the Pskov uprising were brought to Novgorod for trial by Moscow, ending with some being hung or exiled.

== See also ==
- List of food riots
