= Vladimir Slišković =

Bosnian football manager

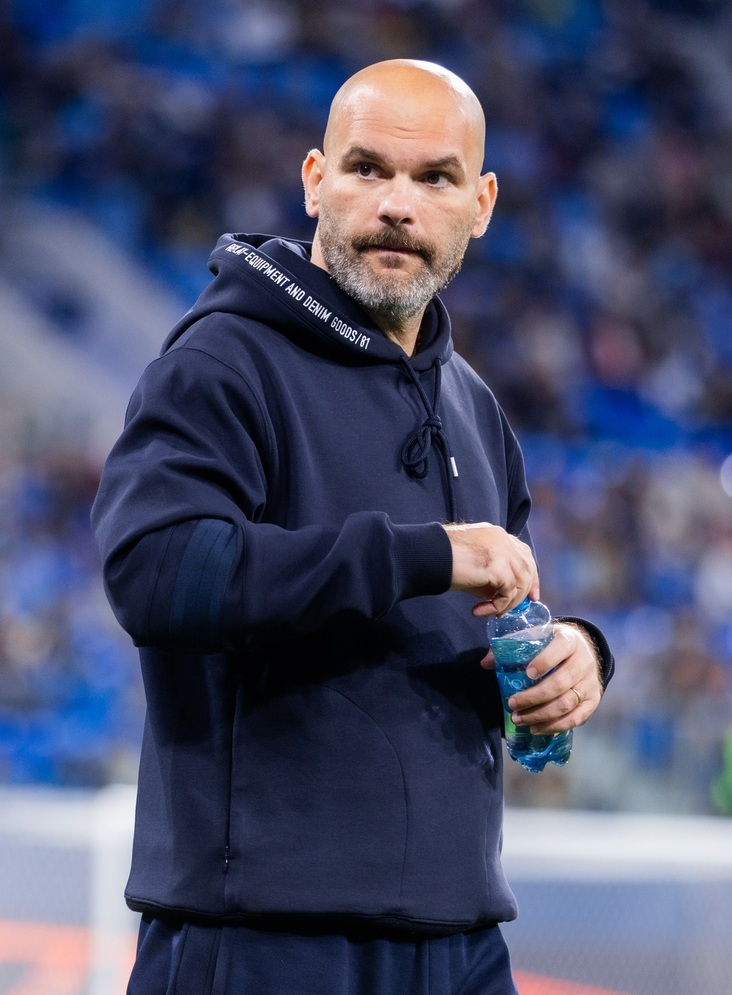
- Slišković coaching Orenburg in 2025

Personal information
- Date of birth: 20 February 1983 (age 43)
- Place of birth: Mostar, SR Bosnia-Herzegovina, SFR Yugoslavia
- Position: Attacking midfielder

Senior career*
Years	Team	Apps	(Gls)
2000–2003	Zrinjski Mostar		
2003–2004	Željezničar Sarajevo		
2006–2007	Zrinjski Mostar		

Managerial career
- 2007–2011: Zrinjski Mostar (youth)
- 2011: Al Ansar (assistant)
- 2012: Qingdao Jonoon (assistant)
- 2013–2016: Zrinjski Mostar (youth)
- 2013–2017: Bosnia U-16 (assistant)
- 2017: Hunan Billows
- 2017–2020: Bosnia U-16 (assistant)
- 2022–2024: Spartak Moscow (assistant)
- 2024: Spartak Moscow (caretaker)
- 2024–2025: Orenburg
- 2026–: Zhenis
- * Club domestic league appearances and goals

Vladimir Slišković (born 20 February 1983) is a Bosnian football manager and a former player.

== Coaching career ==
On 14 April 2024, Slišković was appointed caretaker manager by Spartak Moscow after the dismissal of Guille Abascal. He was selected as coach of the month for April 2024 by the Russian Premier League after coaching Spartak to two victories and a draw in his first three games in charge. On 16 May 2024, Spartak announced that Dejan Stanković will become the manager for the 2024–25 season, with Slišković staying on as an assistant. However, on 29 May 2024, Slišković resigned from Spartak position.

On 7 October 2024, he was hired by Orenburg, in the relegation zone of the Russian Premier League at the time. Orenburg was relegated to Russian First League at the end of the season. It was later administratively returned to the Premier League. Slišković was dismissed by Orenburg on 5 October 2025, following the Orenburg series of 4 losses and 6 winless games.

== Personal life ==
Vladimir is a son of Blaž Slišković, Bosnian football manager and player. He worked as an assistant to Blaž early in his coaching career.

== Honours ==
=== Coaching ===
Individual

- Russian Premier League coach of the month: April 2024.
