= Vladimir Fedotov (footballer, born 1966) =

Russian footballer

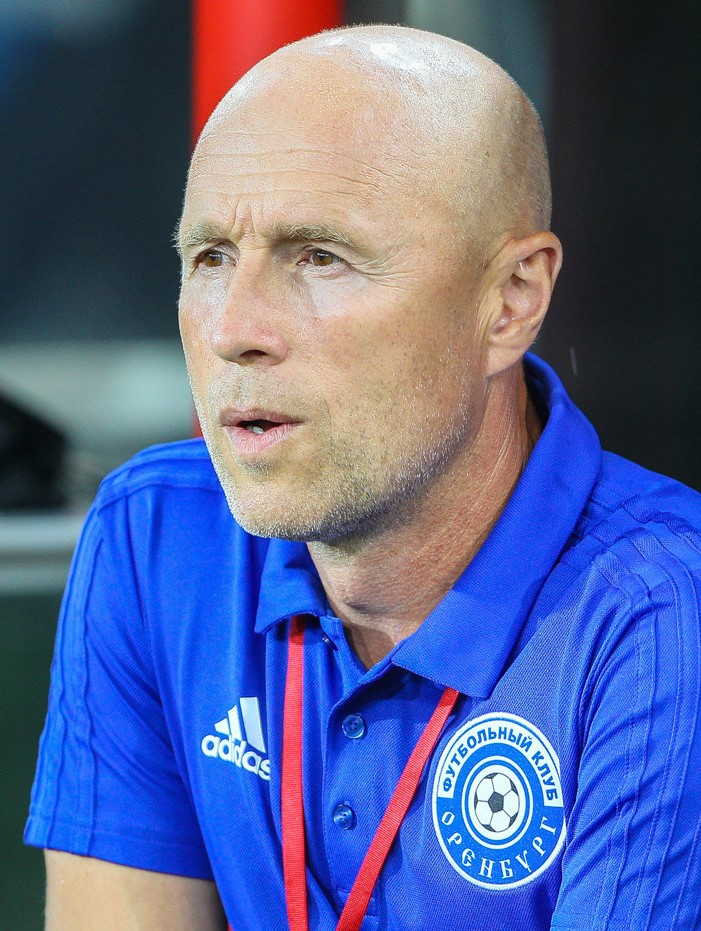
- Fedotov coaching Orenburg in 2018

Personal information
- Full name: Vladimir Valentinovich Fedotov
- Date of birth: 12 August 1966 (age 60)
- Place of birth: Mikhaylovsk, Russian SFSR
- Height: 1.77 m (5 ft 9 1/2 in)
- Positions: Defender; midfielder

Youth career
- 1981–1983: Uralmash Sverdlovsk

Senior career*
Years	Team	Apps	(Gls)
1983	Uralmash Sverdlovsk	2	(0)
1984–1985	Druzhba Yoshkar-Ola	53	(8)
1988	MTsOP-Metallurg Verkhnyaya Pyshma		
1989–1996	Uralmash Yekaterinburg	264	(10)
1997–1998	Arsenal Tula	35	(4)
1999	Gazovik-Gazprom Izhevsk	40	(3)
2000–2002	Sokol Saratov	63	(1)
2002–2003	Ural Sverdlovsk Oblast	21	(0)

Managerial career
- 2004–2009: Ural Yekaterinburg (assistant)
- 2009–2010: Ural Yekaterinburg
- 2011–2013: Metallurg-Kuzbass Novokuznetsk
- 2015: Sinara Kamensk-Uralsky
- 2015–2017: Orenburg (assistant)
- 2017–2019: Orenburg
- 2019–2022: Sochi
- 2022–2024: CSKA Moscow
- * Club domestic league appearances and goals

Vladimir Valentinovich Fedotov (Russian: Владимир Валентинович Федотов; born 12 August 1966) is a Russian professional football coach and a former player.

== Club career ==
He made his professional debut in the Soviet Second League in 1983 for Uralmash Sverdlovsk. Fedotov played in 125 Russian Top League matches before he scored his first goal (for Uralmash in May 1996).

He played 6 games in the UEFA Intertoto Cup 1996 for Uralmash Yekaterinburg.

== Coaching career ==
On 8 December 2019, he was appointed manager of Russian Premier League club Sochi. In the 2020–21 Russian Premier League, he led Sochi to 5th place, qualifying for European competition (UEFA Conference League) for the first time in club's history. In the 2021–22 season, he led Sochi to the 2nd place in the league and was chosen as coach of the month by the league for May 2022.

On 15 June 2022, Fedotov signed a long-term contract to coach CSKA Moscow. In his first season with CSKA, he led the club to the 2nd place in the 2022–23 Russian Premier League and the trophy in the 2022–23 Russian Cup. Fedotov was dismissed by CSKA on 3 June 2024 after CSKA finished 6th in the league.

== Managerial statistics ==
As of 25 May 2024

Managerial record by team and tenure
Team	From	To	Record				
Team	From	To	P	W	D	L	Win %
Ural	14 June 2009	11 May 2010	28	9	14	5	32.14
Metallurg-Kuzbass	1 January 2011	30 June 2013	73	36	12	25	49.32
Orenburg	17 August 2017	8 December 2019	86	44	17	25	51.16
Sochi	1 January 2020	14 June 2022	81	42	17	22	51.85
CSKA Moscow	15 June 2022	3 June 2024	86	44	25	17	51.16
Total			354	175	85	94	49.44

== Honours ==
CSKA Moscow

- Russian Premier League coach of the month: May 2022, July 2022, April 2023.
- Russian Premier League coach of the season: 2022–23.
- Russian Cup: 2022–23
