= Yevgeni Averyanov =

Russian footballer and manager

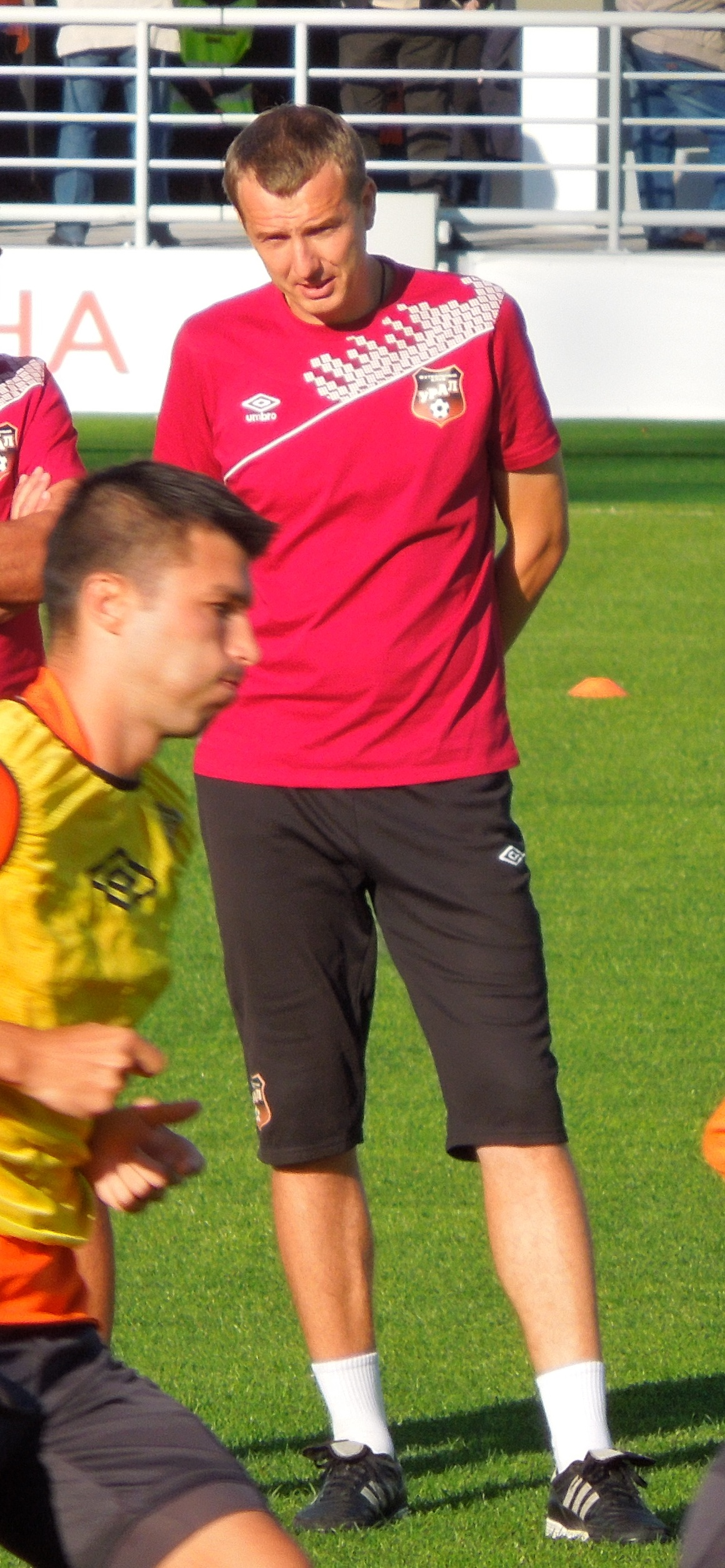
- Averyanov in 2015

Personal information
- Full name: Yevgeni Gennadyevich Averyanov
- Date of birth: 31 March 1979 (age 47)
- Place of birth: Kamensk-Uralsky, Russian SFSR
- Height: 1.90 m (6 ft 3 in)
- Position: Defender

Team information
- Current team: Ural Yekaterinburg (assistant coach)

Senior career*
Years	Team	Apps	(Gls)
1996–1997	Trubnik Kamensk-Uralsky	34	(3)
1998–2008	Ural Yekaterinburg	290	(27)

Managerial career
- 2011–2019: Ural Yekaterinburg (assistant)
- 2019–2020: Ural-2 Yekaterinburg (assistant)
- 2020–2024: Ural Yekaterinburg (assistant)
- 2022: Ural Yekaterinburg (caretaker)
- 2024: Ural Yekaterinburg
- 2026: Ural-2 Yekaterinburg
- 2026–: Ural Yekaterinburg (assistant)
- * Club domestic league appearances and goals

Yevgeni Gennadyevich Averyanov (Russian: Евгений Геннадьевич Аверьянов; born 31 March 1979) is a Russian football manager and a former player who is an assistant coach with Ural Yekaterinburg.

== Playing career ==
He made his professional debut in the 1996 Russian Third League for Trubnik Kamensk-Uralsky.

He then played for 11 seasons (more than 300 games in all competitions) for Ural Yekaterinburg. Even though the club spent 12 seasons in the Russian Premier League, Averyanov mostly represented it in the third-tier PFL. He retired relatively early due to injury.

== Coaching career ==
On 8 August 2022, Averyanov was appointed caretaker manager of Ural Yekaterinburg.
