= Dmitri Pyatibratov =

Russian footballer and coach (born 1976)

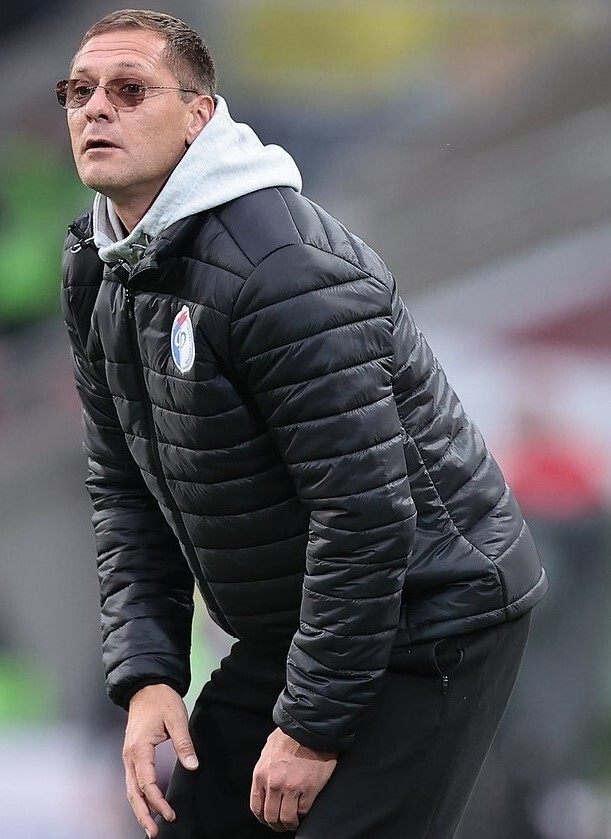
- Pyatibratov in 2022

Personal information
- Full name: Dmitri Anatolyevich Pyatibratov
- Date of birth: 24 May 1976 (age 50)
- Place of birth: Belaya Kalitva, Russia
- Height: 1.85 m (6 ft 1 in)
- Position: Defender

Team information
- Current team: FC Tekstilshchik Ivanovo (manager)

Senior career*
Years	Team	Apps	(Gls)
1993	FC Rostselmash-d Rostov-on-Don	24	(0)
1994–1995	FC Metallurg Krasny Sulin	52	(1)
1996	FC Rostselmash-d Rostov-on-Don	7	(0)
1997	FC Metallurg Krasny Sulin	23	(2)
1999–2000	FC Shakhtyor Shakhty	48	(15)
2001	FC Avtodor Vladikavkaz	15	(1)
2001–2002	FC Alania Vladikavkaz	11	(1)
2002	FC Volgar-Gazprom Astrakhan	9	(1)
2003–2006	FC Amkar Perm	73	(4)
2006	FC Zvezda Irkutsk	30	(2)
2007	FC Mordovia Saransk	22	(4)
2008	FC Irtysh Pavlodar	2	(0)
2008	FC Ryazan	7	(1)
2009	FC Zhemchuzhina Sochi	22	(1)

Managerial career
- 2010–2011: FC Zhemchuzhina-Sochi (assistant)
- 2013–2014: FC Sochi
- 2014: FC Sochi (assistant)
- 2019–2020: FC Mordovia Saransk (assistant)
- 2020–2022: FC Fakel Voronezh (assistant)
- 2022–2023: FC Fakel Voronezh
- 2023–2024: FC Chayka Peschanokopskoye
- 2024–2025: FC Fakel Voronezh
- 2026–: FC Tekstilshchik Ivanovo
- * Club domestic league appearances and goals

Dmitri Anatolyevich Pyatibratov (Russian: Дмитрий Анатольевич Пятибратов; born 24 May 1976) is a Russian professional football coach and a former player who is the manager of FC Tekstilshchik Ivanovo.

== Club career ==
He made his debut in the Russian Premier League in 2001 for FC Alania Vladikavkaz.

== Coaching career ==
On 6 September 2022, Pyatibratov was appointed caretaker manager of FC Fakel Voronezh in the Russian Premier League. On 18 September 2022, he was confirmed as Fakel's manager on a permanent basis. He left Fakel by mutual consent on 30 April 2023.

On 8 June 2024, FC Chayka Peschanokopskoye under Pyatibratov's management secured promotion to the second-tier Russian First League for the 2024–25 season.

On 13 August 2024, Pyatibratov returned to FC Fakel Voronezh. He resigned from Fakel on 30 March 2025, with the club in relegation spot.
