= Khovansky (inhabited locality) =

Name of several Russian rural localities

Khovansky (Russian: Хованский; masculine), Khovanskaya (Хованская; feminine), or Khovanskoye (Хованское; neuter) is the name of several rural localities in Russia:

- Khovansky (rural locality), a khutor in Buyerak-Popovsky Selsoviet of Serafimovichsky District of Volgograd Oblast
- Khovanskoye, Moscow Oblast, a village under the administrative jurisdiction of the suburban settlement of Snegiri, Istrinsky District, Moscow Oblast
- Khovanskoye, Tula Oblast, a village in Plastovsky Rural Okrug of Aleksinsky District of Tula Oblast
- Khovanskoye Cemetery, a large cemetery in Sosenskoye rural settlement of Novomoskovsky Administrative Okrug of Moscow
