= Viktor Goncharenko =

Belarusian football manager (born 1977)

Viktar Hancharenka Віктар Ганчарэнка
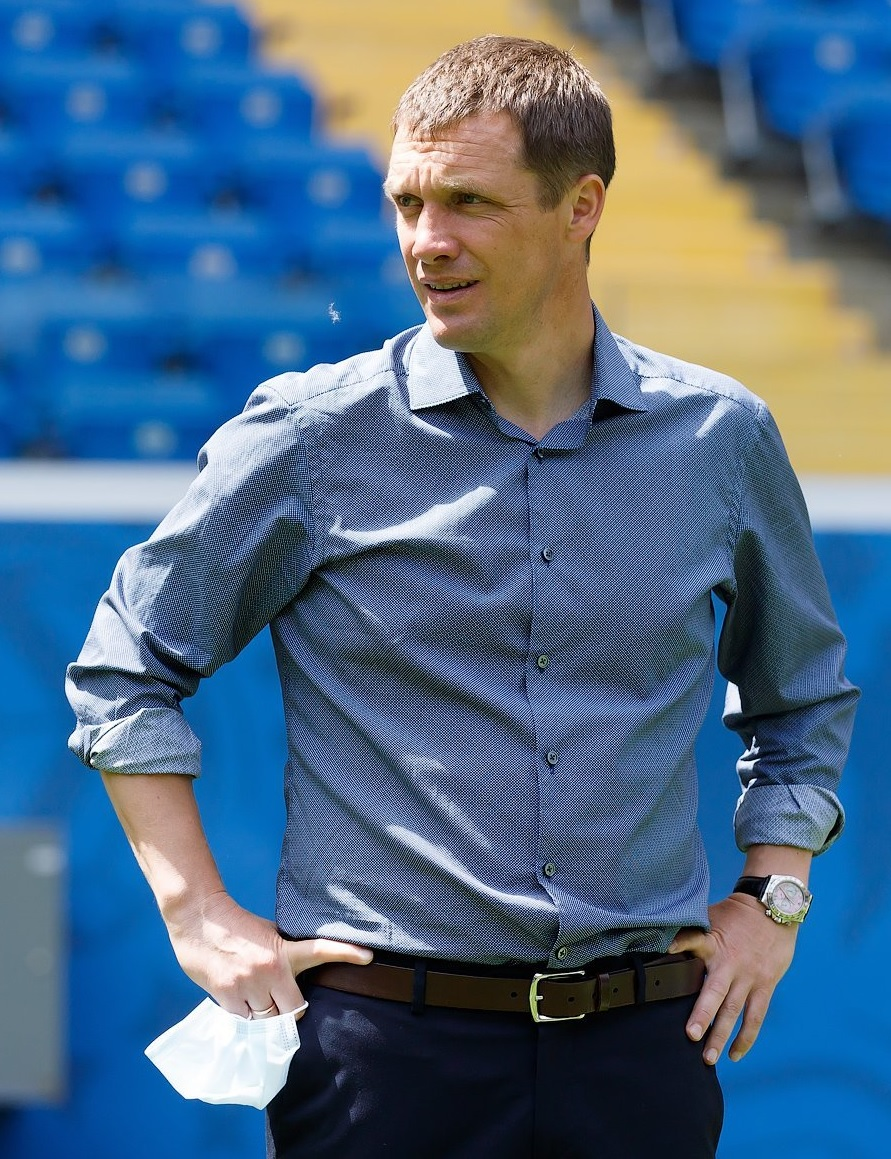
- Goncharenko managing Krasnodar in 2021

Personal information
- Full name: Viktar Mihailavich Hancharenka
- Date of birth: 10 June 1977 (age 49)
- Place of birth: Khoiniki, Byelorussian SSR, Soviet Union
- Height: 1.67 m (5 ft 6 in)
- Position: Defender

Senior career*
Years	Team	Apps	(Gls)
1994–1995	Strelichevo Khoiniki	5	(1)
1995–1997	RUOR Minsk	49	(3)
1998–2002	BATE Borisov	82	(1)
2000	→ RShVSM-Olympia Minsk	2	(0)

International career
1998–1999	Belarus U21	9	(1)

Managerial career
- 2004–2006: BATE Borisov (reserves)
- 2007: BATE Borisov (assistant)
- 2007–2013: BATE Borisov
- 2013–2014: Kuban Krasnodar
- 2015: Ural Sverdlovsk Oblast
- 2015–2016: CSKA Moscow (assistant)
- 2016: Ufa
- 2016–2021: CSKA Moscow
- 2021–2022: Krasnodar
- 2022–2024: Ural Yekaterinburg
- 2024–2025: Pari Nizhny Novgorod
- 2026–: Belarus
- * Club domestic league appearances and goals

Viktar Mihailavich Hancharenka (Belarusian: Віктар Міхайлавіч Ганчарэнка, tr. Viktar Michajłavič Hančarenka; Russian: Виктор Михайлович Гончаренко, Viktor Mikhailovich Goncharenko; born 10 June 1977), is a Belarusian football manager. He is the current manager of the Belarus national football team.

== Early life and career ==
=== Formative years and education ===
Viktar Mihailavich Hancharenka was born in 1977 to a middle-class family in Khoiniki, Belarus. He is the son of Mikhail Hancharenka, a Belarusian engineer who died in 1993 in the wake of the infamous Chernobyl disaster and who was a big football fan. His mother was the manager of a small shop in Belarus. Viktor joined a football school at the young age of 9 years old where his parents encouraged him to do his best to be as successful as possible.

Football was a major part of his life and his father was very impressed with his knowledge of the sport. In 1995, after his father's death, Viktor became a student at the Republic College of Olympic Reserve in Minsk, Belarus. In the RUOR, Viktor got most of his footballing knowledge. He also met other famous Belarusian footballers Alexander Hleb, Vitali Kutuzov and Yuri Zhevnov.

In 1998, Viktor joined BATE Borisov.

== Playing career ==
Hancharenka's playing career began in 1995, when he made his debut as a defender aged 18. While playing for BATE Borisov Viktar became a champion of Belarusian Premier League in 1999, 2002, silver prize winner in 1998, 2000 and bronze prize winner in 2001. At the age of 25 Hancharenka was forced to retire through injury.

== Coaching career ==
Before he became head manager of BATE, Hancharenka was assistant manager at FC BATE under coaches Yuri Puntus and Igor Kriushenko. In 2007 Viktar become a head coach of BATE and won the national championship (2008, 2009, 2010). Under Hancharenka's leadership, BATE in 2008 became the first club from Belarus to qualify for the lucrative group stages of the UEFA Champions League and in 2009–2010 of the UEFA Europa League.

In 2011 Hancharenka and his BATE defeated AZ 4–1 in the group stage of the UEFA Europa League and this allowed the team to advance to the 1/16 stages of the UEFA Europa League Cup.

In August 2011 Hancharenka led his club into the group stage of the Champions League again.

=== Kuban Krasnodar ===
On 12 October 2013, Hancharenka was appointed as manager of Russian Premier League side Kuban Krasnodar. Leaving the club by mutual consent on 13 November 2014.

=== Ural ===
Hancharenka was appointed as manager of Ural Sverdlovsk Oblast on 14 June 2015. After only 6 games in charge, on 25 August 2015, it was reported that Hancharenka had left Ural, and that he wouldn't take charge of the clubs week 7 fixture on 28 August 2015 against Terek Grozny. Subsequently, Hancharenka's contract being terminated by mutual consent on 1 September 2015.

=== Ufa ===
On 6 June 2016, Hancharenka was appointed as manager of FC Ufa. On 12 December 2016, he left Ufa by mutual consent.

=== CSKA Moscow ===
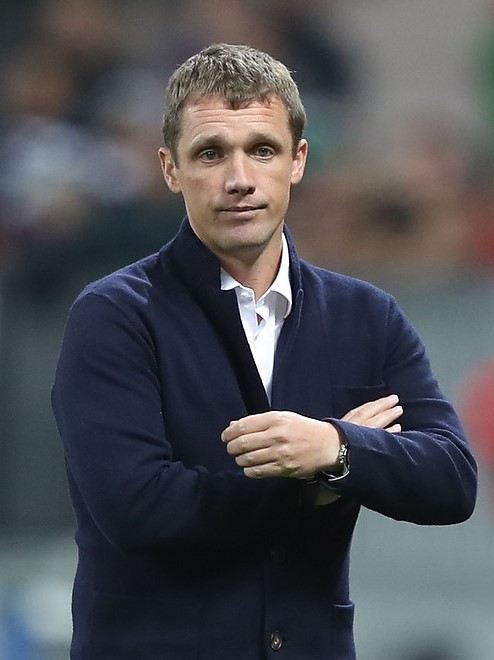
Goncharenko managing CSKA Moscow in 2018

On 12 December 2016, Hancharenka was announced as the new manager of CSKA Moscow, on a two-year contract. Under his management, CSKA won the 2018 Russian Super Cup. In the 2018–19 UEFA Champions League group stage, CSKA defeated the title holders Real Madrid twice, including a 3–0 victory away at Santiago Bernabéu, but remained last in the group as they only gained 1 point in 4 remaining group games.

On 20 May 2020, Goncharenko extended his contract with CSKA until the summer of 2021. On 22 March 2021, Goncharenko left his role as head coach of CSKA Moscow by mutual consent.

=== Krasnodar ===
On 6 April 2021, he signed a contract with FC Krasnodar until the end of the 2022–23 season. On 5 January 2022, Krasnodar announced that Goncharenko had been sacked as head coach of the club.

=== Return to Ural ===
On 15 August 2022, Goncharenko returned to FC Ural Yekaterinburg. He was dismissed on 30 May 2024 after Ural lost the first leg of the relegation play-offs.

=== Pari NN ===
On 9 October 2024, Goncharenko was hired by Russian Premier League club FC Pari Nizhny Novgorod. Goncharenko was dismissed by Pari Nizhny Novgorod on 11 June 2025.

=== Belarus ===
Goncharenko became the new head coach of Belarus on 6 January 2026.

== Managerial statistics ==
As of match played 15 November 2026

Team	From	To	Record				
Team	From	To	G	W	D	L	Win %
BATE Borisov	13 November 2007	12 October 2013	278	163	65	50	58.63
Kuban Krasnodar	12 October 2013	13 November 2014	38	16	12	10	42.11
Ural Sverdlovsk Oblast	14 June 2015	1 September 2015	6	1	2	3	16.67
Ufa	6 June 2016	12 December 2016	19	9	4	6	47.37
CSKA Moscow	12 December 2016	22 March 2021	183	92	40	51	50.27
FC Krasnodar	6 April 2021	5 January 2022	26	11	6	9	42.31
Ural	15 August 2022	30 May 2024	78	29	17	32	37.18
Pari Nizhny Novgorod	9 October 2024	12 June 2025	22	6	4	12	27.27
Belarus	6 January 2026	Present	10	6	2	2	60.00
Total			660	333	152	175	50.45

== Honours ==
=== As a player ===
BATE Borisov

- Belarusian Premier League: 1999, 2002

=== As a coach ===
BATE Borisov

- Belarusian Premier League: 2008, 2009, 2010, 2011, 2012
- Belarusian Cup: 2009–10
- Belarusian Super Cup: 2010, 2011, 2013

CSKA Moscow

- Russian Super Cup: 2018

=== Individual ===
- Belarusian Premier League Manager of the Year: 2008, 2009, 2010, 2012, 2014, 2016, 2017
- IFFHS The 17th place in World's Best Club Coach of the Year list: 2008
- Russian Premier League Manager of the Month: October 2022
