= Pavel Alpatov =

Russian football coach and former player

Personal information
- Full name: Pavel Alekseyevich Alpatov
- Date of birth: 29 May 1990 (age 36)
- Place of birth: Domodedovo, Russian SFSR
- Height: 1.77 m (5 ft 10 in)
- Position: Midfielder

Team information
- Current team: Dynamo Moscow (assistant coach)

Youth career
- 1997–2001: Torpedo Lyubertsy
- 2002–2003: FShM-Torpedo Moscow
- 2004–2007: Dynamo Moscow

Senior career*
Years	Team	Apps	(Gls)
2008	Dynamo Moscow	0	(0)
2009	Yu.-M.-Spartak-2 Moscow		
2010	Khimki-2 (amateur)		
2010–2012	Lyubertsy (amateur)		

Managerial career
- 2015–2019: Dynamo Moscow (academy)
- 2020: Dynamo-2 Moscow (assistant)
- 2020–2023: Dynamo Moscow (assistant)
- 2023: Dynamo Moscow (caretaker)
- 2023–2026: Dynamo-2 Moscow
- 2026–: Dynamo Moscow (assistant)
- * Club domestic league appearances and goals

Pavel Alekseyevich Alpatov (Russian: Павел Алексеевич Алпатов; born 29 May 1990) is a Russian football coach and a former player. He is an assistant manager of Dynamo Moscow.

== Career ==
Alpatov finished his youth career with Dynamo Moscow academy and played for Dynamo's reserve team in the 2008 season, where he was the teammate of future national team players Anton Shunin, Fyodor Smolov and Aleksandr Kokorin. He did not play on the professional level and retired as a player at the age of 22.

Alpatov started his coaching career back at Dynamo's academy. In early 2020 he was appointed assistant coach at Dynamo-2 Moscow, and in October 2020 he was promoted to the first squad as an assistant coach to Sandro Schwarz. He also assisted Dynamo's next manager Slaviša Jokanović.

On 15 May 2023, following the firing of Jokanović, Alpatov was appointed caretaker manager for Dynamo, becoming the coach for his former teammates Shunin and Smolov.

On 22 June 2023, Alpatov was appointed manager of Dynamo-2 Moscow. In the 2024 season, he led Dynamo-2 to promotion from the fourth-tier Russian Second League Division B to the third-tier Russian Second League Division A.

He returned to the assistant manager position with the main Dynamo squad upon the return of Sandro Schwarz.
