= Anton Khazov =

Russian footballer (born 1979)

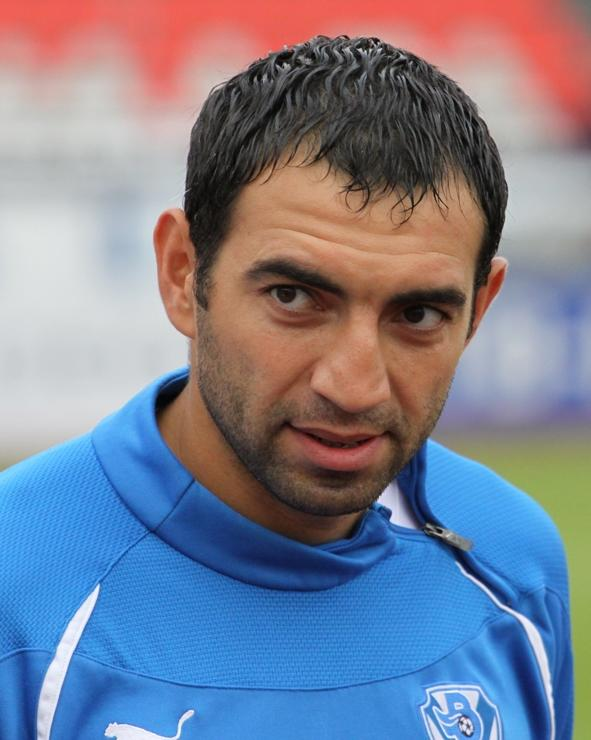
- Khazov with Volga in 2011

Personal information
- Full name: Anton Gennadyevich Khazov
- Date of birth: 28 April 1979 (age 47)
- Place of birth: Kaliningrad, Soviet Union
- Height: 1.85 m (6 ft 1 in)
- Position: Forward

Team information
- Current team: FC KAMAZ Naberezhnye Chelny (manager)

Senior career*
Years	Team	Apps	(Gls)
1998–2000	FC Torpedo-Viktoriya Nizhny Novgorod	69	(37)
2001–2003	FC Dynamo Moscow	57	(15)
2003–2008	FC Shinnik Yaroslavl	110	(18)
2009–2011	FC Volga Nizhny Novgorod	77	(19)
2012–2013	FC Tom Tomsk	31	(4)
2013–2015	FC Gazovik Orenburg	35	(7)
2015–2016	FC Zenit Penza	17	(4)
2016–2017	FC Olimpiyets Nizhny Novgorod	17	(2)

International career
2001	Russia U-21	1	(0)

Managerial career
- 2017–2021: FC Nizhny Novgorod (youth development)
- 2021: FC Nizhny Novgorod (caretaker)
- 2021–2025: FC Pari Nizhny Novgorod (assistant)
- 2022: FC Pari Nizhny Novgorod (caretaker)
- 2024: FC Pari Nizhny Novgorod (caretaker)
- 2025–: FC KAMAZ Naberezhnye Chelny
- * Club domestic league appearances and goals

Anton Gennadyevich Khazov (Russian: Антон Геннадьевич Хазов; born 28 April 1979) is a Russian football coach and a former player. He is the manager of FC KAMAZ Naberezhnye Chelny.

== Club career ==
He made his Russian Premier League debut for FC Dynamo Moscow on 5 May 2001 in a game against FC Chernomorets Novorossiysk.

== Honours ==
- Russian Second Division Zone Povolzhye top scorer: 2000 (26 goals).
