= Mikhail Galaktionov =

Russian football manager (born 1984)

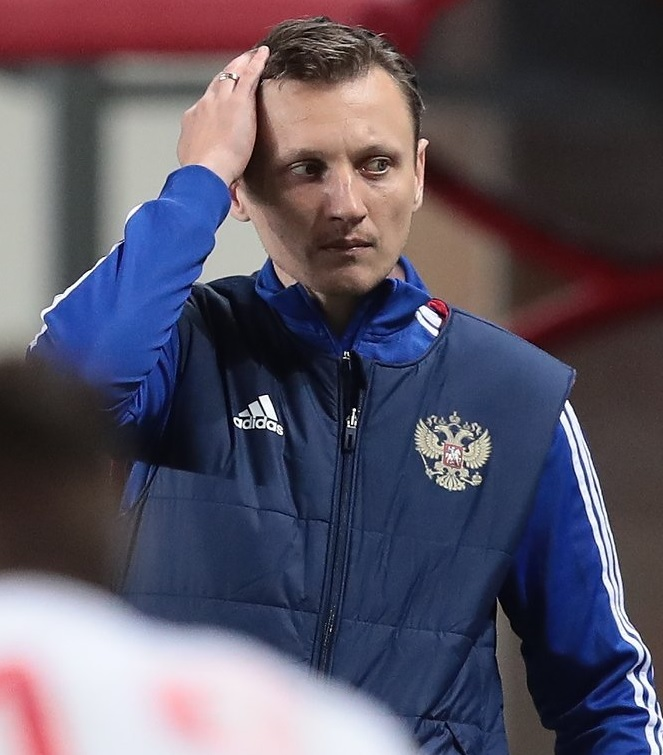
- Galaktinov coaching Russia U-21 in 2020

Personal information
- Full name: Mikhail Mikhaylovich Galaktionov
- Date of birth: 21 May 1984 (age 42)
- Place of birth: Moscow, Russian SFSR

Managerial career
- Years: Team
- MFK Dina Moscow (assistant)
- 2011–2014: Russia U-16
- 2014–2015: Russia U-17
- 2015–2016: Russia U-18
- 2016: Russia U-19
- 2017: Russia U-18
- 2017: Akhmat Grozny (assistant)
- 2017: Akhmat Grozny (caretaker)
- 2017–2018: Akhmat Grozny
- 2018: Russia U-20
- 2018–2023: Russia U-21
- 2022: Pari NN
- 2022–2026: Lokomotiv Moscow

Mikhail Mikhaylovich Galaktionov (Russian: Михаил Михайлович Галактионов; born 21 May 1984) is a Russian football manager.

== Managing career ==
He reached the semifinal of the 2015 UEFA European Under-17 Championship as the manager of the Russia U-17 squad.

He was appointed a caretaker manager of FC Akhmat Grozny in the Russian Premier League after their previous manager Oleg Kononov resigned on 30 October 2017.

On 14 December 2017 he was appointed Akhmat's permanent manager and signed a 3.5-year contract with the club.

He resigned from Akhmat on 7 April 2018 following a series of 2 draws and 4 losses in 6 games as the team dropped to 11th in the table.

On 7 December 2018, he was appointed head coach of the Russia national under-21 football team. Under his management, the team qualified for 2021 UEFA Under-21 Euro, marking the second time Russia qualified in the last 12 attempts.

On 16 June 2022, Galaktionov signed a two-year contract with Russian Premier League club FC Pari Nizhny Novgorod. As Russia was banned from international competitions at the time due to the Russian invasion of Ukraine, including the Under-21 national team, Russian Football Union permitted Galaktionov to hold both positions simultaneously. On 11 November 2022, Galaktionov resigned from his Pari NN position.

On 13 November 2022, Galaktionov signed a contract with FC Lokomotiv Moscow until the end of the 2023–24 season, with an option to extend. His first games with Lokomotiv were successful and he won Russian Premier League Coach of the Month award for March 2023. Lokomotiv only lost once (to the champions Zenit St. Petersburg) for the rest of the 2022–23 season under Galaktionov's management, and went from 14th place to 8th.

In June 2023, the national team for players born in 2004 and younger was converted to the Russia U-21 squad, taking their manager with them, replacing Galaktionov's squad.

On 17 November 2026, Galaktionov left Lokomotiv by mutual consent, following a series of disappointing results, with the team in relegation zone.

== Managerial statistics ==
As of 6 November 2026

Managerial record by team and tenure
| Team | From | To | Record | | | | | Ref. |
| Team | From | To | P | W | D | L | Win % | Ref. |
|---|---|---|---|---|---|---|---|---|
| Russia U17 | 1 July 2014 | 31 December 2015 | 29 | 15 | 8 | 6 | 51.72 | |
| Russia U18 | 1 July 2015 | 30 June 2016 | 17 | 11 | 4 | 2 | 64.71 | |
| Russia U19 | 1 July 2016 | 31 December 2016 | 6 | 4 | 2 | 0 | 66.67 | |
| Russia U18 | 1 January 2017 | 31 May 2017 | 11 | 8 | 1 | 2 | 72.73 | |
| Akhmat Grozny (caretaker) | 31 October 2017 | 13 December 2017 | 5 | 2 | 2 | 1 | 40.00 | |
| Akhmat Grozny | 14 December 2017 | 8 April 2018 | 4 | 0 | 1 | 3 | 0.00 | |
| Russia U20 | 22 May 2018 | 7 December 2018 | 9 | 3 | 2 | 4 | 33.33 | |
| Russia U21 | 7 December 2018 | 31 December 2022 | 29 | 19 | 4 | 6 | 65.52 | |
| Nizhny Novgorod | 16 June 2022 | 11 November 2022 | 21 | 8 | 4 | 9 | 38.10 | |
| Lokomotiv Moscow | 13 November 2022 | 17 November 2026 | 158 | 74 | 45 | 39 | 46.84 | |
| Total | | | 289 | 144 | 73 | 72 | 49.83 | |
