= Main Moscow derby =

- Other names: Derby of the East
- Location: Moscow
- Teams: Spartak; CSKA
- First meeting: 1 June 1922; OLLS 4–2 MKS
- Latest meeting: 22 November 2025; Spartak 1-0 CSKA; Russian Premier League
- Next meeting: TBD

Statistics
- Total meetings: 201
- Most wins: Spartak (86)
- Top scorer: Vágner Love (9 goals)
- All-time series: Spartak: 86; Drawn: 40; CSKA: 75
- Largest victory: 27 June 1993; Spartak 6–0 CSKA; Russian Top League
- Largest goal scoring: 16 March 1990; Spartak 5–4 CSKA; Soviet Top League

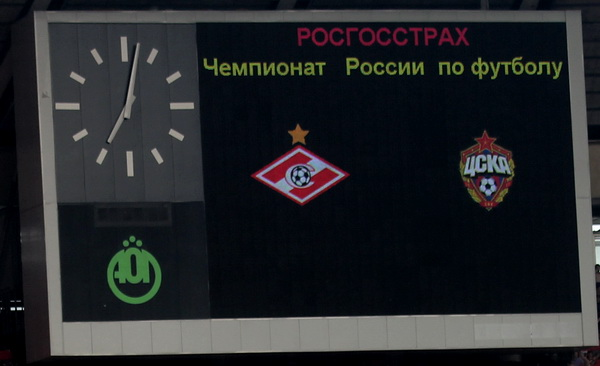
Scoreboard from a Spartak vs. CSKA game in 2010.

The Main Moscow derby (Russian: Главное московское дерби) is the name of the association football local derby between two Moscow based teams – Spartak and CSKA. Both Spartak and CSKA fans (they often call each other "Svinie" (pigs) and "Koni" (horses) respectively) have recognized each other as rivals.

== History ==
The first derby between Spartak and CSKA (at that time known as MKS and OLLS respectively) took place on 1 June 1922. The OLLS won 4–2. As of 22 November 2025, Spartak has won 86 times, CSKA 75, and 40 matches ended in a draw.

== Records ==
- The biggest win of Spartak in the Moscow Championship — 8–0.
- The biggest win of CSKA in the Moscow Championship — 1–6.
- The biggest win of Spartak in the Soviet Top League — 0–5.
- The biggest win of CSKA in the Soviet Top League — 5–1.
- The biggest win of Spartak in the Russian Premier League — 0–6.
- The biggest win of CSKA in the Russian Premier League — 1–5, 0–4.
- The biggest win of Spartak in the Soviet Cup — 4–0.
- The biggest win of CSKA in the Soviet Cup — 0–3.
- The biggest win of Spartak in the Russian Cup — no.
- The biggest win of CSKA in the Russian Cup — 3–0.
- Highest scoring match — 9 goals in a 4–5 Spartak triumph.
- Highest attendance — 105,000, on 8 June 1959, on 25 July 1960 and on 4 October 1962.
- On 26 July 2009, there were 70,000 fans in the match; it is the record attendance in the Russian Championship until now.
- Lowest attendance — 4000, on 24 October 1993.
- 64 times the Derby took place in the Luzhniki Stadium.
- The highest goal-scorer in the history of the Derby is Vágner Love, with 9 goals. Sergei Salnikov is second with 7.

== See also ==
- Moscow Basketball derby
- List of association football rivalries
- Spartak Moscow–Dynamo Kyiv derby
- Russia's oldest derby - Spartak Moscow vs. Dynamo Moscow
