= Ivan Nikitich Khovansky =

Russian noble (died 1675)

Prince Ivan Nikitich Khovansky (Russian: Иван Никитич Хованский; died 1675) was a Russian boyar (noble) and voyevoda, nephew of Ivan Andreyevich Khovansky and cousin of Tararui.

== Life ==
Ivan Nikitich Khovansky was first mentioned in historical documents as a stolnik in 1625. It is also known that he commanded a Tula regiment between March 20, 1628 and October 1, 1629. In 1634, Ivan Nikitich was appointed regiment voyevoda in Borovsk and a year later relocated to Tula to guard the city from the Crimean Tatars and Nogais, where he would remain until 1637. Upon Alexei Mikhailovich's accession to the throne in 1645, Ivan Nikitich was sent to Mozhaisk and Vyazma to get their pledge of allegiance to the new tsar. That same year, however, he would be exiled to Siberia for his refusal to "kiss the cross" (that is, to pledge his allegiance to the tsar). This pledge of allegiance explicitly stated that "one should not want to serve foreign sovereigns, kings, or princes other than his own Russian tsar". For reasons still unclear, Khovansky kept company with Prince Valdemar of Denmark (a bastard son of Christian IV of Denmark), who was resisting the conversion to Orthodox Christianity before marrying Irina, the elder daughter of the previous tsar, Mikhail Fyodorovich. Ivan Nikitich Khovansky tried to make Prince Valdemar stay in Moscow and to assure the tsar that the prince would convert. In 1648, the government had to deal with the Salt Riot, which probably influenced the tsar’s decision to send for Khovansky and summon him back to Moscow. Curiously, upon his return to the capital, Ivan Khovansky was granted the title of a boyar, by-passing the rank of okolnichy.

In 1650, there was an uprising in Novgorod and Pskov. Ivan Nikitich Khovansky was ordered to suppress them. Without entering Novgorod, Khovansky and his army stopped at Khutyn Monastery and tried to reason with the insurgents through negotiations. A few days later, the Novgorodians laid down their arms, and Khovansky slowly proceeded with arrests. The tsar was unhappy with such deliberation, but Metropolitan Nikon of Novgorod intervened on the part of Khovansky saying it was him who had advised Ivan Nikitich to conduct an unhasty search for the ringleaders in order to avoid armed confrontation. After having dealt with Novgorod, Ivan Khovansky led his army to Pskov. He had too little troops under his command to take the whole city, but he managed to rebuff the sallies organized by the Pskovians. With the help of a Zemsky Sobor delegation, the city would soon submit to the authorities without resorting to violence. For his achievements, Ivan Nikitich Khovansky was rewarded with a gilded velvet fur coat, a goblet, and salary raise. On March 20 of 1652, he was sent to Solovetsky Monastery together with Metropolitan Nikon with a mission to bring the relics of Metropolitan Philip II to Moscow. In 1654, the Russo-Polish War began, and Ivan Nikitich Khovansky joined the tsar in the siege of Smolensk. After Alexei Mikhailovich’s departure to Moscow in March 1655, Khovansky remained in Smolensk as a voyevoda. In 1660, he defeated the Polish army at the village of Malchami.
