= Guille Abascal =

Spanish footballer and manager

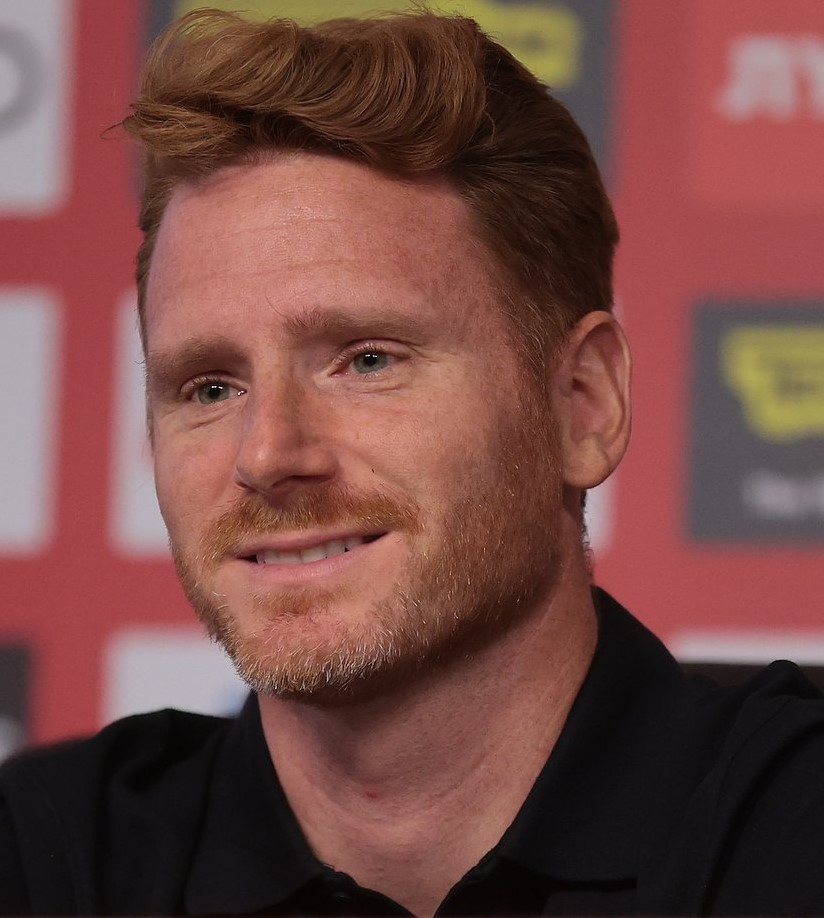
- Abascal as manager of Spartak Moscow in 2022

Personal information
- Full name: Guillermo Abascal Pérez
- Date of birth: 13 April 1989 (age 37)
- Place of birth: Seville, Spain
- Position: Forward

Youth career
- Heliópolis
- 2001–2004: Barcelona
- 2004–2008: Sevilla

Senior career*
Years	Team	Apps	(Gls)
2009–2010	Abre	2	(0)
2010–2011	Aboño	0	(0)

Managerial career
- 2016–2017: Sevilla (youth)
- 2017–2018: Chiasso
- 2018: Lugano
- 2019–2020: Ascoli (youth)
- 2020: Ascoli (caretaker)
- 2020: Ascoli
- 2021: Volos
- 2022: Basel
- 2022–2024: Spartak Moscow
- 2024: Granada
- 2025–2026: Atlético San Luis
- * Club domestic league appearances and goals

Guillermo "Guille" Abascal Pérez (born 13 April 1989) is a Spanish professional football manager and former player who last managed Mexican club Atlético San Luis.

Having ended his professional career at 19 after being on the books of Barcelona and Sevilla, he began managing aged 28 with Chiasso in the Swiss Challenge League, and leading Lugano and Basel in the Swiss Super League. He also managed Ascoli in Serie B, Volos in the Super League Greece and Spartak Moscow in the Russian Premier League.

== Club career ==
=== Early career ===
Born in Seville, Andalusia, Abascal joined FC Barcelona's La Masia in 2001, from hometown amateurs AD Heliópolis CF. He left the club in 2004, and finished his formation with Sevilla FC.

Abascal retired from professional football at the age of 18, and started studying at the Pablo de Olavide University in his hometown, while still representing amateurs UDE Abre and CD Aboño. He also spent a year at the University of Algarve, and returned to Sevilla in 2013 as a youth fitness coach. His first managerial experience came in 2016, when he took over Sevilla's Infantil B squad.

=== Chiasso ===
On 12 June 2017, Abascal moved abroad, being appointed manager of Swiss Challenge League side FC Chiasso. He made his professional debut ten days later in a 2–2 draw at Servette FC on the opening day of the season.

Abascal was sacked on 4 April 2018, after suffering six defeats in his last eight matches.

=== Lugano ===
On 10 April 2018, Abascal was named at the helm of Ticino neighbours FC Lugano in the Swiss Super League until the end of the season; he drew 1–1 at home to FC Thun in his first top-flight game. From being placed ninth and threatened with relegation, he led the club to eighth position, three points shy of the European qualification places.

=== Ascoli ===
In July 2019, Abascal was hired as manager for the Primavera (under-19) squad of Italian club Ascoli Calcio 1898 FC. The following 27 January, Paolo Zanetti was dismissed as the head coach of the senior squad, and Abascal was appointed as caretaker manager.

Abascal won 3–0 in Serie B in his only game away to U.S. Livorno 1915 on 1 February 2020. The next day, Roberto Stellone was hired and Abascal returned to his previous role; he came back to the first team on 16 April, after Stellone was dismissed.

Following two defeats in two games in charge by the time the league season was resumed after the COVID-19 forced break, Abascal was dismissed on 22 June 2020.

=== Volos ===
In June 2021, Abascal was appointed at Super League Greece club Volos FC. He won four of his first five games, but was dismissed in December after six consecutive defeats.

=== Basel ===
Abascal came back to Switzerland's top flight at FC Basel on 21 February 2022, following the termination of Patrick Rahmen's contract. Despite coming second to FC Zürich in his interim spell, he was replaced by club icon Alexander Frei in May.

=== Spartak Moscow ===
On 10 June 2022, Abascal signed with Russian Premier League club FC Spartak Moscow. He beat eight other candidates to the two-year contract. The current Russian Cup holders were due to play in the UEFA Europa League but were barred due to the FIFA and UEFA response to the Russian invasion of Ukraine.

Abascal's debut occurred on 9 July 2022, in a 4–0 Super Cup loss to FC Zenit Saint Petersburg. His first Russian Premier League game was a 1–1 away draw against FC Akhmat Grozny on 16 July. Abascal won his first match next week, on 23 July, in a 1–4 victory over FC Krasnodar. Spartak won their next three games and took the league lead after five games played on 14 August 2022. By the season's winter break in November, Spartak was second in the league table. By the end of the season, however, they finished third.

Under his leadership, Spartak began the 2023–24 season by winning five matches out of five, making it the most successful season start in the club's history. Abascal was dismissed by Spartak on 14 April 2024.

=== Granada ===
On 19 June 2024, Abascal was appointed manager of Granada CF in his home country's Segunda División, after agreeing to a one-year contract. He was sacked on 20 September, after one win in six matches.

== Managerial statistics ==
As of match played 21 March 2026

Managerial record by team and tenure
Team	Nat	From	To	Record							
Team	Nat	From	To	P	W	D	L	GF	GA	GD	Win %
Chiasso	(Switzerland)	July 2017	April 2018	28	8	6	14	29	45	−16	28.57
Lugano	(Switzerland)	April 2018	October 2018	19	7	6	6	29	28	+1	36.84
Ascoli	(Italy)	January 2020	February 2020	1	1	0	0	3	0	+3	100.00
Ascoli	(Italy)	April 2020	June 2020	2	0	0	2	1	4	−3	0.00
Volos	(Greece)	July 2021	November 2021	11	4	1	6	19	23	−4	36.36
Basel	(Switzerland)	February 2022	June 2022	16	5	7	4	24	20	+4	31.25
Spartak Moscow	(Russia)	June 2022	14 April 2024	71	35	15	21	127	96	+31	49.30
Granada CF	(Spain)	19 June 2024	20 September 2024	6	1	3	2	6	8	−2	16.67
Atlético San Luis	(Mexico)	13 May 2025	23 March 2026	32	9	4	19	47	55	−8	28.13
Total				186	70	42	74	285	279	+6	37.63

== Personal life ==
On April 11, 2023, Abascal married Alejandra de Agora, the wedding took place in Moscow. In May, the couple had a son, Guillermo Nicolai.
