= FC Trubnik Kamensk-Uralsky =

- Full name: Football Club Trubnik Kamensk-Uralsky
- Founded: 1946
- Dissolved: 1999
- League: Russian Second Division, Zone Ural
- 1998: 18th

FC Trubnik Kamensk-Uralsky (Russian: «Трубник» (Каменск‑Уральский)) was a Russian football team from Kamensk-Uralsky. It played professionally in 1946, 1948–1949, 1960, 1963–1965 and 1994 to 1998. Their best result was 12th place in the Zone 2 of the second-highest Soviet First League in 1948 and 1949.

== Team name history ==
- 1946–1947 FC Tsvetmet Kamensk-Uralsky
- 1948 FC Tsvetnyye Metally Kamensk-Uralsky
- 1949 FC Tsvetmet Kamensk-Uralsky
- 1960 FC Metallurg Kamensk-Uralsky
- 1963–1965 FC Salyut Kamensk-Uralsky
- 1992–1998 FC Trubnik Kamensk-Uralsky
