= 2016–17 FC Rostov season =

FC Rostov
2016–17 season
- Chairman: Viktor Goncharov
- Manager: Kurban Berdyev (until 6 August 2016); Dmitri Kirichenko (caretaker) (6 August – 9 September 2016); Ivan Daniliants (from 9 September 2016)
- Stadium: Olimp – 2
- Russian Premier League: 6th
- Russian Cup: Round of 32 (vs. Dynamo Moscow)
- Champions League: Group stage
- Europa League: Round of 16 (vs. Manchester United)
- Top goalscorer: League: Sardar Azmoun; Dmitry Poloz (7 each); All: Dmitry Poloz (14)
| Home colours | Away colours | Third colours |

The 2016–17 FC Rostov season was the club's eighth successive season in the Russian Premier League, the highest tier of football in Russia. Rostov also take part in the Russian Cup, entering at the round of 32 stage and the Champions League for the first time, entering at the third qualifying round.

== Season events ==
On 6 August 2016, Kurban Berdyev resigned as manager, with Dmitri Kirichenko being appointed as the club's caretaker-manager. On 9 September 2016, Ivan Daniliants was appointed as the club's new head-coach. On 9 September 2016, Kurban Berdyev was appointed as the FC Rostov vicepresident.

== Squad ==
As of 24 February 2017

Note: Flags indicate national team as defined under FIFA eligibility rules; some limited exceptions apply. Players may hold more than one non-FIFA nationality.

| No. | Pos. | Nation | Player |
|---|---|---|---|
| 1 | GK | RUS | Ivan Komissarov |
| 2 | MF | BLR | Timofei Kalachev |
| 4 | DF | RUS | Vladimir Granat |
| 5 | DF | RUS | Denis Terentyev |
| 7 | FW | RUS | Dmitry Poloz |
| 8 | MF | RUS | Igor Kireyev |
| 11 | FW | RUS | Aleksandr Bukharov |
| 16 | MF | ECU | Christian Noboa |
| 18 | MF | RUS | Pavel Mogilevets |
| 19 | MF | RUS | Khoren Bayramyan |
| 20 | FW | IRI | Sardar Azmoun |
| 21 | DF | RUS | Andrei Sorokin |
| 22 | DF | MNE | Marko Simić |

| No. | Pos. | Nation | Player |
|---|---|---|---|
| 23 | DF | SLO | Miha Mevlja |
| 28 | MF | ROU | Andrei Prepeliță |
| 30 | DF | RUS | Fyodor Kudryashov |
| 33 | FW | UKR | Marko Dević |
| 35 | GK | RUS | Soslan Dzhanayev |
| 44 | DF | ESP | César Navas |
| 69 | DF | RUS | Nikita Kovalyov |
| 71 | MF | RUS | Dmitri Veber |
| 77 | GK | RUS | Nikita Medvedev |
| 84 | MF | MDA | Alexandru Gațcan (Captain) |
| 89 | MF | RUS | Aleksandr Yerokhin |
| 97 | GK | RUS | Yevgeni Goshev |
| — | DF | ANG | Nandinho |

=== Out on loan ===
Note: Flags indicate national team as defined under FIFA eligibility rules; some limited exceptions apply. Players may hold more than one non-FIFA nationality.

| No. | Pos. | Nation | Player |
|---|---|---|---|
| 6 | MF | IRI | Saeid Ezatolahi (at Anzhi Makhachkala) |
| 9 | MF | RUS | Maksim Grigoryev (at Orenburg) |
| 10 | MF | MLI | Moussa Doumbia (at Arsenal Tula) |
| 14 | MF | RUS | Valeri Yaroshenko (at Baltika Kaliningrad) |

| No. | Pos. | Nation | Player |
|---|---|---|---|
| 17 | DF | RUS | Dmitri Skopintsev (at Baltika Kaliningrad) |
| — | MF | RUS | Aleksandr Troshechkin (at Fakel Voronezh) |
| — | FW | GEO | Nika Kacharava (at Ethnikos Achna) |

== Transfers ==
=== Summer ===
In: Note: Flags indicate national team as defined under FIFA eligibility rules; some limited exceptions apply. Players may hold more than one non-FIFA nationality.

| No. | Pos. | Nation | Player |
|---|---|---|---|
| 1 | GK | RUS | Ivan Komissarov (from (Russia) Olimpiyets Nizhny Novgorod) |
| 3 | DF | SEN | Papa Gueye (from (Ukraine) Dnipro Dnipropetrovsk) |
| 4 | DF | RUS | Vladimir Granat (from (Russia) Spartak Moscow) |
| 9 | MF | RUS | Maksim Grigoryev (from (Russia) Lokomotiv Moscow) |
| 14 | MF | RUS | Valeri Yaroshenko (from (Russia) Zenit St. Petersburg) |
| 17 | DF | RUS | Dmitri Skopintsev (from (Germany) RB Leipzig) |
| 20 | FW | IRI | Sardar Azmoun (from (Russia) Rubin Kazan, previously on loan) |
| 23 | DF | SLO | Miha Mevlja (from (Romania) Dinamo București) |
| 28 | MF | ROU | Andrei Prepeliță (from (Bulgaria) Ludogorets Razgrad) |
| 57 | MF | RUS | Danil Sviridov (from own academy) |
| 62 | DF | RUS | Artyom Yesaulenko |
| 74 | MF | RUS | Norik Mkrtchyan (from own academy) |
| 79 | GK | RUS | Danila Yermakov (from (Russia) Krylia Sovetov Samara) |
| 81 | MF | RUS | Andrei Napolov (from own academy) |
| 83 | MF | RUS | Roman Petrov (from own academy) |
| 94 | MF | RUS | Igor Cherkasov (from own academy) |

Out: Note: Flags indicate national team as defined under FIFA eligibility rules; some limited exceptions apply. Players may hold more than one non-FIFA nationality.

| No. | Pos. | Nation | Player |
|---|---|---|---|
| 1 | GK | KAZ | Stas Pokatilov (on loan to (Kazakhstan) Kairat) |
| 9 | MF | GAB | Guélor Kanga (to (Serbia) Red Star Belgrade) |
| 12 | GK | RUS | Nikita Chagrov (to (Russia) Chayka Peschanokopskoye) |
| 15 | DF | ANG | Bastos (to (Italy) Lazio) |
| 18 | MF | RUS | Pavel Mogilevets (end of loan from (Russia) Zenit St. Petersburg) |
| 21 | FW | RUS | Said-Ali Akhmayev (to (Russia) Chernomorets Novorossiysk) |
| 23 | MF | RUS | Aleksandr Troshechkin (on loan to (Russia) Fakel Voronezh) |
| 25 | DF | RUS | Ivan Novoseltsev (to (Russia) Zenit St.Petersburg) |
| 28 | DF | FIN | Boris Rotenberg (end of loan from (Russia) Dynamo Moscow) |
| 32 | FW | GEO | Nika Kacharava (on loan to (Cyprus) Ethnikos Achna) |
| 34 | DF | RUS | Timofei Margasov (to (Russia) Krylia Sovetov) |
| 46 | FW | RUS | Danila Lyuft (to (Russia) Dynamo Stavropol) |
| 48 | MF | RUS | Artyom Maksimenko (to (Russia) Spartak Dzhankoy) |
| 51 | GK | RUS | Ivan Zozin |
| 58 | MF | RUS | Maksim Kondrashyov |
| 59 | DF | RUS | Ivan Reutenko |
| 62 | GK | RUS | Vladislav Suslov (to (Russia) Arsenal-2 Tula) |
| 63 | DF | RUS | Aleksandr Logunov (to (Russia) Avangard Kursk) |
| 66 | MF | RUS | Daniil Ostapenko (to (Russia) Zenit Penza) |
| 68 | MF | RUS | Vasili Lipin |
| 73 | DF | RUS | Aleksei Grechkin (to (Russia) Armavir) |
| 74 | MF | RUS | Yevgeni Stukanov (to (Russia) Rotor Volgograd) |
| 86 | FW | KOR | Yoo Byung-soo |
| 94 | GK | RUS | Roman Pshukov |
| 96 | DF | RUS | Nikita Bocharov |
| 99 | FW | MNE | Nemanja Nikolić (to (Kazakhstan) Aktobe) |
| — | DF | RUS | Ruslan Abazov (to (Russia) Tosno, previously on loan to (Russia) Tyumen) |
| — | DF | RUS | Temur Mustafin (to (Russia) Zenit St. Petersburg, previously on loan to (Russia) Avangard Kursk) |
| — | MF | RUS | Artyom Kulishev (to (Russia) Dynamo St. Petersburg, previously on loan) |

=== Winter ===
In: Note: Flags indicate national team as defined under FIFA eligibility rules; some limited exceptions apply. Players may hold more than one non-FIFA nationality.

| No. | Pos. | Nation | Player |
|---|---|---|---|
| 17 | MF | IRI | Reza Shekari (from (Iran) Zob Ahan Esfahan) |
| 18 | MF | RUS | Pavel Mogilevets (from (Russia) Zenit St. Petersburg) |
| 21 | DF | RUS | Andrei Sorokin (from (Russia) Sakhalin Yuzhno-Sakhalinsk) |
| 22 | DF | MNE | Marko Simić (from (Israel) Hapoel Tel Aviv) |
| 33 | FW | UKR | Marko Dević (from (Russia) Rubin Kazan) |
| — | DF | ANG | Nandinho |

Out: Note: Flags indicate national team as defined under FIFA eligibility rules; some limited exceptions apply. Players may hold more than one non-FIFA nationality.

| No. | Pos. | Nation | Player |
|---|---|---|---|
| 3 | DF | SEN | Papa Gueye (to (Kazakhstan) Aktobe) |
| 6 | MF | IRI | Saeid Ezatolahi (on loan to (Russia) Anzhi Makhachkala) |
| 9 | MF | RUS | Maksim Grigoryev (on loan to (Russia) Orenburg) |
| 10 | MF | MLI | Moussa Doumbia (on loan to (Russia) Arsenal Tula) |
| 14 | MF | RUS | Valeri Yaroshenko (on loan to (Russia) Baltika Kaliningrad) |
| 17 | DF | RUS | Dmitri Skopintsev (on loan to (Russia) Baltika Kaliningrad) |
| 31 | MF | RUS | Ruslan Shapovalov |
| 57 | MF | RUS | Danil Sviridov |
| — | GK | KAZ | Stas Pokatilov (to (Kazakhstan) Kairat, previously on loan) |

== Friendlies ==
| 13 January 2017 | Rostov (Russia) | 4–0 | (Saudi Arabia) Al-Hilal | Abu Dhabi, United Arab Emirates |
| MSK (UTC+3) | Bukharov 6'; Kireyev 49'; Kudryashov 52'; Azmoun 66' | Report |

| 19 January 2017 | Rostov (Russia) | 3–1 | (China) Henan Jianye | Abu Dhabi, United Arab Emirates |
| MSK (UTC+3) | Bukharov 6'; Skopintsev 23'; Yerokhin 49' | Report |

== Competitions ==
=== Russian Premier League ===
==== Results by round ====
| Round | 1 | 2 | 3 | 4 | 5 | 6 | 7 | 8 | 9 | 10 | 11 | 12 | 13 | 14 | 15 | 16 | 17 | 18 | 19 | 20 | 21 | 22 | 23 | 24 | 25 | 26 | 27 | 28 | 29 | 30 |
|---|---|---|---|---|---|---|---|---|---|---|---|---|---|---|---|---|---|---|---|---|---|---|---|---|---|---|---|---|---|---|
| Ground | H | H | A | H | A | H | A | H | H | A | A | A | H | A | H | A | H | A | H | A | H | A | A | H | H | H | A | H | A | A |
| Result | W | D | L | W | L | W | L | W | W | L | D | L | W | D | W | L | D | W | D | D | D | D | D | W | W | W | L | W | W | L |
| Position | 4 | 4 | 7 | 5 | 7 | 6 | 8 | 5 | 4 | 5 | 6 | 7 | 7 | 6 | 6 | 6 | 7 | 7 | 8 | 7 | 7 | 8 | 9 | 5 | 5 | 5 | 6 | 6 | 4 | 6 |

Updated to match(es) played on 21 May 2017. Source: See results
A = Away; H = Home; W = Win; D = Draw; L = Loss

==== Matches ====
| 30 July 2016 1 | Rostov | 1–0 | Orenburg | Rostov-on-Don |
| 21:30 MSK (UTC+3) | Novoseltsev 83'; Kalachou (yellow card) 88' | Summary | Afonin (yellow card) 59'; Shogenov (yellow card) 67'; Poluyakhtov (yellow card) 82' (yellow-red card) 85' | Stadium: Olimp-2; Attendance: 6,000; Referee: Alexey Nikolaev |

| 7 August 2016 2 | Rostov | 0–0 | Ural | Rostov-on-Don |
| 21:30 MSK (UTC+3) | Azmoun (red card) 22'; Gațcan (yellow card) 25'; Bukharov (yellow card) 45+2' | Summary | Fidler (yellow card) 25'; Pavlyuchenko (yellow card) 25'; Yemelyanov (yellow card) 56'; Fontanello (yellow card) 65' | Stadium: Olimp-2; Attendance: 8,494; Referee: Igor Fedotov |

| 12 August 2016 3 | Zenit St.Petersburg | 3–2 | Rostov | Saint Petersburg |
| 19:30 MSK (UTC+3) | Smolnikov (yellow card) 29'; García (yellow card) 33'; Witsel (yellow card) 45+2'; Giuliano 50' (pen.); Kokorin (yellow card) 68'; Ezatolahi 72' (o.g.); Đorđević 85' (yellow card) 86' | Summary | Poloz 8', 14'; Kalachou (yellow card) 18'; Gațcan (yellow card) 30' (yellow-red card) 44'; Navas (yellow card) 49' | Stadium: Petrovsky Stadium; Attendance: 17,967; Referee: Vladimir Moskalyov |

| 20 August 2016 4 | Rostov | 3–0 | Tom Tomsk | Rostov-on-Don |
| 21:30 MSK (UTC+3) | Novoseltsev 17'; Ezatolahi 45'; Kudryashov (yellow card) 49'; Yerokhin 52'; Bayramyan (yellow card) 90+2' | Summary | Ciupercă (yellow card) 45+1'; Ten (yellow card) 66'; Jablonský (yellow card) 90' | Stadium: Olimp-2; Attendance: 7,971; Referee: Aleksandr Egorov |

| 28 August 2016 5 | Terek Grozny | 2–1 | Rostov | Grozny |
| 19:15 MSK (UTC+3) | Semyonov (yellow card) 30'; Balaj 33'; Ángel 35'; Utsiev (yellow card) 54' | Summary | Utsiev 31' (o.g.); Bukharov (yellow card) 41'; Ezatolahi (yellow card) 51'; Gațcan (yellow card) 53' (yellow-red card) 70'; Kalachou (yellow card) 63' | Stadium: Akhmat-Arena; Attendance: 14,372; Referee: Aleksei Matyunin |

| 9 September 2016 6 | Rostov | 2–1 | Krylya Sovetov | Rostov-on-Don |
| 20:00 MSK (UTC+3) | Terentyev (yellow card) 28'; Bukharov 33' (yellow card) 86'; Prepeliță 59'; Gueye (yellow card) 61' | Summary | Yerokhin 54' (o.g.); Kornilenko (yellow card) 87'; Taranov (yellow card) 90+2'; Yatchenko (yellow card) 90+4' | Stadium: Olimp-2; Attendance: 14,800; Referee: Sergey Karasev |

| 18 September 2016 7 | Krasnodar | 2–1 | Rostov | Krasnodar |
| 20:00 MSK (UTC+3) | Naldo 87'; Smolov 90+4' (pen.) | Summary | Navas 10'; Noboa (yellow card) 36'; Poloz (yellow card) 77' | Stadium: Kuban Stadium; Attendance: 6,425; Referee: Aleksey Eskov |

| 24 September 2016 8 | Rostov | 1–0 | Lokomotiv Moscow | Rostov-on-Don |
| 21:30 MSK (UTC+3) | Poloz 41'; Yerokhin (yellow card) 42' (yellow-red card) 83' | Summary | Denisov (yellow card) 53' | Stadium: Olimp-2; Attendance: 12,777; Referee: Kirill Levnikov |

| 2 October 2016 9 | Rostov | 2–0 | CSKA Moscow | Rostov-on-Don |
| 21:30 MSK (UTC+3) | Mevlja (yellow card) 39'; Gațcan 66'; Noboa 90+3' | Summary | Tošić (yellow card) 41'; Ignashevich (yellow card) 52' | Stadium: Olimp-2; Attendance: 14,150; Referee: Aleksandr Egorov |

| 15 October 2016 10 | Spartak Moscow | 1–0 | Rostov | Moscow |
| 19:30 MSK (UTC+3) | Fernando (yellow card) 30'; Glushakov 53'; Kombarov (yellow card) 66' | Summary | Navas (yellow card) 30' (yellow-red card) 74'; Kudryashov (red card) 45+1'; Granat (yellow card) 86'; Yerokhin (yellow card) 90' | Stadium: Otkrytiye Arena; Attendance: 32,221; Referee: Vladislav Bezborodov |

| 22 October 2016 11 | Ufa | 0–0 | Rostov | Ufa |
| 14:30 MSK (UTC+3) | Fatai (yellow card) 41'; Stotsky (yellow card) 45+2'; Vaněk (yellow card) 46' | Summary | Gueye (yellow card) 72' | Stadium: Neftyanik Stadium; Attendance: 7,200; Referee: Evgeny Turbin |

| 29 October 2016 12 | Amkar Perm | 1–0 | Rostov | Perm |
| 15:30 MSK (UTC+3) | Kostyukov 44'; Condé (yellow card) 56'; Balanovich (yellow card) 62' | Summary | Ezatolahi (yellow card) 40'; Bayramyan (yellow card) 53'; Kireyev (yellow card) 75' | Stadium: Zvezda Stadium; Attendance: 5,150; Referee: Aleksei Matyunin |

| 6 November 2016 13 | Rostov | 4–1 | Arsenal Tula | Rostov-on-Don |
| 17:00 MSK (UTC+3) | Yerokhin 26', 90'; Azmoun 36'; Gațcan (yellow card) 70'; Poloz 85' | Summary | Burmistrov 8'; Belyayev (yellow card) 90+3' | Stadium: Olimp-2; Attendance: 8,400; Referee: Kirill Levnikov |

| 18 November 2016 14 | Rubin Kazan | 0–0 | Rostov | Kazan |
| 19:30 MSK (UTC+3) | Zhemaletdinov (yellow card) 79' | Summary | Gațcan (yellow card) 30'; Navas (yellow card) 58' | Stadium: Kazan Arena; Attendance: 18,971; Referee: Alexey Nikolaev |

| 27 November 2016 15 | Rostov | 2–0 | Anzhi Makhachkala | Rostov-on-Don |
| 16:30 MSK (UTC+3) | Azmoun 41'; Kalachev (yellow card) 45+1'; Gațcan 79' (red card) 80' | Summary | Obertan (yellow card) 37'; Xandão (yellow card) 64' | Stadium: Olimp-2; Attendance: 9,194; Referee: Igor Fedotov |

| 30 November 2016 16 | Ural | 1–0 | Rostov | Yekaterinburg |
| 17:00 MSK (UTC+3) | Lungu 38' (yellow card) 38' | Summary | Prepeliță (yellow card) 29'; Gueye (yellow card) 55' | Stadium: SKB-Bank Arena |

| 3 December 2016 17 | Rostov | 0–0 | Zenit St.Petersburg | Rostov-on-Don |
| 19:00 MSK (UTC+3) | Kalachev (yellow card) 49'; Azmoun (yellow card) 88' | Summary | Yusupov (yellow card) 43'; Criscito (yellow card) 45+1'; Neto (yellow card) 60' | Stadium: Olimp-2; Attendance: 9,110; Referee: Vitaly Meshkov |

| 3 March 2017 18 | Tom Tomsk | 0–6 | Rostov | Rostov-on-Don |
| 19:00 MSK (UTC+3) | Gvineysky (yellow card) 39' | Summary | Bukharov 19', 45+1'; Kudryashov (yellow card) 42'; Dević 69'; Yerokhin 78'; Azmoun 80', 90+1' | Stadium: Olimp-2; Attendance: 8,283; Referee: Aleksey Sukhoy |

| 12 March 2017 19 | Rostov | 0–0 | Terek Grozny | Rostov-on-Don |
| 19:00 MSK (UTC+3) | Navas (yellow card) 16'; Kireyev (yellow card) 28'; Gațcan (yellow card) 64' | Summary | Kuzyayev (yellow card) 70' | Stadium: Olimp-2; Attendance: 9,734; Referee: Aleksey Eskov |

| 19 March 2017 20 | Krylia Sovetov | 0–0 | Rostov | Samara |
| 14:00 MSK (UTC+3) | Zinkov (yellow card) 56' | Summary | Noboa (yellow card) 8'; Yerokhin (yellow card) 21'; Kalachev (yellow card) 41'; Navas (yellow card) 60' | Stadium: Metallurg Stadium; Attendance: 6,572; Referee: Aleksandr Egorov |

| 3 April 2017 21 | Rostov | 0–0 | Krasnodar | Rostov-on-Don |
| 19:30 MSK (UTC+3) | | Summary | Kaboré (yellow card) 39'; Martynovich (yellow card) 63'; Pereyra (yellow card) 78'; Smolov (yellow card) 90+3' | Stadium: Olimp-2; Attendance: 12,542; Referee: Evgeny Turbin |

| 9 April 2017 22 | Lokomotiv Moscow | 0–0 | Rostov | Moscow |
| 19:00 MSK (UTC+3) | Tarasov (yellow card) 41' | Summary | Azmoun (yellow card) 29'; Bukharov (yellow card) 84' | Stadium: Lokomotiv Stadium; Attendance: 9,619; Referee: Vladislav Bezborodov |

| 15 April 2017 23 | CSKA Moscow | 0–0 | Rostov | Moscow |
| 14:30 MSK (UTC+3) | Fernandes (yellow card) 62' | Summary | Kalachev (yellow card) 79'; Gațcan (yellow card) 84' | Stadium: VEB Arena; Attendance: 15,000; Referee: Kirill Levnikov |

| 22 April 2017 24 | Rostov | 3–0 | Spartak Moscow | Rostov-on-Don |
| 16:30 MSK (UTC+3) | Bukharov 23', 50'; Bayramyan (yellow card) 43'; Gațcan 45+3'; Azmoun (yellow card) 80' | Summary | Glushakov (red card) 75' | Stadium: Olimp-2; Attendance: 11,800; Referee: Mikhail Vilkov |

| 25 April 2017 25 | Rostov | 1–0 | Ufa | Rostov-on-Don |
| 19:30 MSK (UTC+3) | Poloz 23' | Summary | Bezdenezhnykh (yellow card) 21'; Carp (yellow card) 28'; Nikitin (yellow card) 53' | Stadium: Olimp-2; Attendance: 7,834; Referee: Alexey Nikolaev |

| 30 April 2017 26 | Rostov | 1–0 | Amkar Perm | Rostov-on-Don |
| 19:30 MSK (UTC+3) | Bukharov 57' | Summary | Miljković (yellow card) 33'; Jovičić (red card) 54'; Idowu (yellow card) 58' | Stadium: Olimp-2; Attendance: 9,873; Referee: Sergey Lapochkin |

| 6 May 2017 27 | Arsenal Tula | 1–0 | Rostov | Tula |
| 16:30 MSK (UTC+3) | Rasic (yellow card) 16'; Burmistrov 37'; Doumbia (yellow card) 70'; Gabulov (yellow card) 90+1' | Summary | Bayramyan (yellow card) 20' | Stadium: Arsenal Stadium; Attendance: 10,100; Referee: Alexey Nikolaev |

| 14 May 2017 28 | Rostov | 4–2 | Rubin Kazan | Rostov-on-Don |
| 19:00 MSK (UTC+3) | Azmoun 7', 51'; Poloz 19'; Kudryashov (yellow card) 22'; Noboa 73' | Report | M'Vila 75'; Kanunnikov 87'; Akhmetov (yellow card) 90' | Stadium: Olimp-2; Attendance: 11,091; Referee: Vladislav Bezborodov |

| 17 May 2017 29 | Anzhi Makhachkala | 1–2 | Rostov | Kaspiysk |
| 19:30 MSK (UTC+3) | Tetrashvili (yellow card) 31'; Prudnikov 78'; Budkivskyi (yellow card) 90+1' | Report | Bayramyan (yellow card) 58'; Azmoun 61'; Poloz 64'; Terentyev (yellow card) 90+2' | Stadium: Anzhi Arena; Attendance: 4,500; Referee: Alexey Nikolaev |

| 21 May 2017 30 | Orenburg | 2–0 | Rostov | Orenburg |
| 15:00 MSK (UTC+3) | Lobjanidze (yellow card) 21'; Koronov (yellow card) 22'; Vorobyov 52' (yellow card) 79'; Georgiev (yellow card) 72'; Breyev 75' (yellow card) 78'; Parnyakov (yellow card) 77'; Andreyev (yellow card) 90+2'; Ďuriš (red card) 90+2' | Report | Yerokhin (yellow card) 9'; Kalachev (yellow card) 49'; Terentyev (yellow card) 53'; Azmoun (yellow card) 86'; Gațcan (yellow card) 88'; Kudryashov (yellow card) 90+2'; Noboa (red card) 90+2' | Stadium: Gazovik Stadium; Attendance: 6,952; Referee: Dmitry Safyan |

==== League table ====
| Pos | Team | Pld | W | D | L | GF | GA | GD | Pts | Qualification or relegation |
|---|---|---|---|---|---|---|---|---|---|---|
| 4 | Krasnodar | 30 | 12 | 13 | 5 | 40 | 22 | +18 | 49 | Qualification for the Europa League third qualifying round |
| 5 | Terek Grozny | 30 | 14 | 6 | 10 | 38 | 35 | +3 | 48 | |
| 6 | Rostov | 30 | 13 | 9 | 8 | 36 | 18 | +18 | 48 | |
| 7 | Ufa | 30 | 12 | 7 | 11 | 22 | 25 | −3 | 43 | |
| 8 | Lokomotiv Moscow | 30 | 10 | 12 | 8 | 39 | 27 | +12 | 42 | Qualification for the Europa League group stage (Note: Lokomotiv Moscow qualified for the Europa League group stage by winning the 2016–17 Russian Cup.) |

Source: Russian Premier League, Soccerway
Rules for classification: 1) Points; 2) Matches won; 3) Head-to-head points; 4) Head-to-head matches won; 5) Head-to-head goal difference; 6) Head-to-head goals scored; 7) Head-to-head away goals; 8) Goal difference; 9) Goals scored; 10) Away goals scored.

=== Russian Cup ===
| 21 September 2016 Round of 32 | Dynamo Moscow | 4–0 | Rostov | Khimki |
| 14:00 MSK (UTC+3) | Rykov 5'; Gueye 19' (o.g.); Markelov 45'; Temnikov 90+2' | Summary | Khodunov (yellow card) 5'; Ezatolahi (yellow card) 58' | Stadium: Arena Khimki; Attendance: 5,000; Referee: Vladimir Seldyakov |

=== UEFA Champions League ===
==== Qualifying rounds ====
| 26 July 2016 Third qualifying round 1st leg | Rostov (Russia) | 2–2 | (Belgium) Anderlecht | Rostov-on-Don, Russia |
| 21:30 MSK (UTC+3) | Ezatolahi 16'; Poloz 60' (pen.); Kalachou (yellow card) 68' | Report | Hanni 3'; Chipciu (yellow card) 19'; Tielemans 52'; Sylla (yellow card) 65'; Acheampong (yellow card) 80' | Stadium: Olimp-2; Attendance: 14,770; Referee: Luca Banti (Italy) |

| 3 August 2016 Third qualifying round 2nd leg | Anderlecht (Belgium) | 0–2 (2–4 agg.) | (Russia) Rostov | Anderlecht, Belgium |
| 21:45 MSK (UTC+3) | Sylla (yellow card) 45+2' | Report | Noboa 28'; Kudryashov (yellow card) 45+2'; Azmoun 47'; Gațcan (yellow card) 54'; Navas (yellow card) 58'; Ezatolahi (yellow card) 77'; Terentyev (yellow card) 89' | Stadium: Constant Vanden Stock Stadium; Attendance: 19,464; Referee: Matej Jug (Slovenia) |

| 16 August 2016 Play-off round 1st leg | Ajax (Netherlands) | 1–1 | (Russia) Rostov | Amsterdam, Netherlands |
| 21:45 MSK (UTC+3) | Klaassen 38' (pen.) (yellow card) 65'; Veltman (yellow card) 88' | Report | Yerokhin (yellow card) 8'; Noboa 13' (yellow card) 90'; Navas (yellow card) 37'; Kudryashov (yellow card) 52'; Ezatolahi (yellow card) 74'; Gațcan (yellow card) 89' | Stadium: Amsterdam Arena; Attendance: 51,463; Referee: Willie Collum (Scotland) |

| 24 August 2016 Play-off round 2nd leg | Rostov (Russia) | 4–1 (5–2 agg.) | (Netherlands) Ajax | Rostov-on-Don, Russia |
| 21:45 MSK (UTC+3) | Azmoun 34' (yellow card) 39'; Poloz (yellow card) 41' (goal) 66'; Yerokhin 52'; Navas (yellow card) 53'; Noboa 60'; Kudryashov (red card) 83' | Report | Klaassen 84' (pen.); Viergever (yellow card) 87' | Stadium: Olimp-2; Attendance: 15,320; Referee: Milorad Mažić (Serbia) |

==== Group stage ====
| Pos | Team | Pld | W | D | L | GF | GA | GD | Pts | Qualification |
|---|---|---|---|---|---|---|---|---|---|---|
| 1 | (Spain) Atlético Madrid | 6 | 5 | 0 | 1 | 7 | 2 | +5 | 15 | Advance to knockout phase |
| 2 | (Germany) Bayern Munich | 6 | 4 | 0 | 2 | 14 | 6 | +8 | 12 | Advance to knockout phase |
| 3 | (Russia) Rostov | 6 | 1 | 2 | 3 | 6 | 12 | −6 | 5 | Transfer to Europa League |
| 4 | (Netherlands) PSV Eindhoven | 6 | 0 | 2 | 4 | 4 | 11 | −7 | 2 | |

Source: UEFA
Rules for classification: Group stage tiebreakers

| 13 September 2016 1 | Bayern Munich (Germany) | 5–0 | (Russia) Rostov | Munich, Germany |
| 21:45 MSK (UTC+3) | Lewandowski 28' (pen.); Müller 45+2'; Kimmich 53', 60'; Bernat 90' | Report | | Stadium: Allianz Arena; Attendance: 70,000; Referee: Anthony Taylor (England) |

| 28 September 2016 2 | Rostov (Russia) | 2–2 | (Netherlands) PSV Eindhoven | Rostov-on-Don, Russia |
| 21:45 MSK (UTC+3) | Poloz 8', 37'; Terentyev (yellow card) 39'; Navas (yellow card) 57' | Report | Pröpper 14'; L. de Jong 45+2'; Guardado (yellow card) 53'; Hendrix (yellow card) 57' | Stadium: Olimp-2; Attendance: 12,646; Referee: Clément Turpin (France) |

| 19 October 2016 3 | Rostov (Russia) | 0–1 | (Spain) Atlético Madrid | Rostov-on-Don, Russia |
| 21:45 MSK (UTC+3) | Mevlja (yellow card) 28' | Report | Filipe Luís (yellow card) 4'; Carrasco 62'; Juanfran (yellow card) 70' | Stadium: Olimp-2; Attendance: 15,400; Referee: Daniele Orsato (Italy) |

| 1 November 2016 4 | Atlético Madrid (Spain) | 2–1 | (Russia) Rostov | Madrid, Spain |
| 21:45 MSK (UTC+3) | Griezmann 28', 90+3'; Godín (yellow card) 44'; Koke (yellow card) 46'; Luís (yellow card) 83' | Report | Azmoun 30' (yellow card) 58'; Kalachev (yellow card) 46'; Gațcan (yellow card) 68'; Dzhanayev (yellow card) 82' | Stadium: Vicente Calderón; Attendance: 40,392; Referee: Craig Thomson (Scotland) |

| 23 November 2016 5 | Rostov (Russia) | 3–2 | (Germany) Bayern Munich | Rostov-on-Don, Russia |
| 20:00 MSK (UTC+3) | Granat (yellow card) 30'; Azmoun 44'; Poloz 50' (pen.); Gațcan (yellow card) 57'; Noboa 67' | Report | Douglas Costa 35'; Boateng (yellow card) 48'; Bernat 52' | Stadium: Olimp-2; Attendance: 15,211; Referee: Artur Soares Dias (Portugal) |

| 6 December 2016 6 | PSV Eindhoven (Netherlands) | 0–0 | (Russia) Rostov | Eindhoven, Netherlands |
| 21:45 MSK (UTC+3) | Bergwijn (yellow card) 64'; Moreno (yellow card) 87' | Report | Granat (yellow card) 40' | Stadium: Philips Stadion; Attendance: 33,400; Referee: Deniz Aytekin (Germany) |

=== UEFA Europa League ===
==== Knockout stage ====
| 16 February 2017 Round of 32 1st Leg | Rostov (Russia) | 4–0 | (Czech Republic) Sparta Prague | Rostov-on-Don, Russia |
| 21:00 MSK (UTC+3) | Mevlja 15'; Poloz 38'; Noboa 40'; Azmoun 68' | Report | Konaté (yellow card) 20' (yellow-red card) 32'; Dočkal (yellow card) 35' | Stadium: Olimp-2; Attendance: 6,160; Referee: Bas Nijhuis (Netherlands) |

| 23 February 2017 Round of 32 2nd Leg | Sparta Prague (Czech Republic) | 1–1 (1–5 agg.) | (Russia) Rostov | Prague, Czech Republic |
| 23:05 MSK (UTC+3) | Nhamoinesu (yellow card) 36' (yellow-red card) 66'; Šural (yellow card) 71'; Karavayev 84' | Report | Poloz 13'; Bukharov (yellow card) 24'; Kalachev (yellow card) 51'; Yerokhin (yellow card) 77' | Stadium: Generali Arena; Attendance: 13,413; Referee: Hüseyin Göçek (Turkey) |

| 9 March 2017 Round of 16 1st Leg | Rostov (Russia) | 1–1 | (England) Manchester United | Rostov-on-Don, Russia |
| 21:00 MSK (UTC+3) | Gațcan (yellow card) 25'; Bukharov (yellow card) 44' (goal) 53'; Noboa (yellow card) 59'; Kalachev (yellow card) 73' | Report | Mkhitaryan (yellow card) 21' (goal) 35'; Herrera (yellow card) 78' | Stadium: Olimp-2; Attendance: 14,223; Referee: Felix Zwayer (Germany) |

| 16 March 2017 Round of 16 2nd Leg | Manchester United (England) | 1–0 (2–1 agg.) | (Russia) Rostov | Manchester, England |
| 23:05 MSK (UTC+3) | Mata 70' | Report | Bukharov (yellow card) 87' | Stadium: Old Trafford; Attendance: 64,361; Referee: Gediminas Mažeika (Lithuania) |

== Squad statistics ==
As of match played 21 May 2017

=== Appearances and goals ===
| No. | Pos | Nat | Player | Total | | Premier League | | Russian Cup | | Champions League | | Europa League | |
| No. | Pos | Nat | Player | Apps | Goals | Apps | Goals | Apps | Goals | Apps | Goals | Apps | Goals |
|---|---|---|---|---|---|---|---|---|---|---|---|---|---|
| 2 | MF | (Belarus) BLR | Timofei Kalachev | 37 | 0 | 22+3 | 0 | 0 | 0 | 9 | 0 | 3 | 0 |
| 4 | DF | (Russia) RUS | Vladimir Granat | 21 | 0 | 11+1 | 0 | 0 | 0 | 6 | 0 | 3 | 0 |
| 5 | DF | (Russia) RUS | Denis Terentyev | 36 | 0 | 17+7 | 0 | 0 | 0 | 5+4 | 0 | 1+2 | 0 |
| 7 | FW | (Russia) RUS | Dmitry Poloz | 40 | 14 | 22+4 | 7 | 0 | 0 | 9+1 | 5 | 4 | 2 |
| 8 | MF | (Russia) RUS | Igor Kireyev | 15 | 0 | 8+3 | 0 | 1 | 0 | 1+1 | 0 | 0+1 | 0 |
| 11 | FW | (Russia) RUS | Aleksandr Bukharov | 27 | 7 | 11+7 | 6 | 0 | 0 | 3+2 | 0 | 3+1 | 1 |
| 16 | MF | (Ecuador) ECU | Christian Noboa | 40 | 7 | 26 | 2 | 0 | 0 | 10 | 4 | 4 | 1 |
| 18 | MF | (Russia) RUS | Pavel Mogilevets | 7 | 0 | 0+7 | 0 | 0 | 0 | 0 | 0 | 0 | 0 |
| 19 | MF | (Russia) RUS | Khoren Bayramyan | 23 | 0 | 14+6 | 0 | 1 | 0 | 0+1 | 0 | 1 | 0 |
| 20 | FW | (Iran) IRI | Sardar Azmoun | 41 | 12 | 20+7 | 7 | 0 | 0 | 8+2 | 4 | 1+3 | 1 |
| 22 | DF | (Montenegro) MNE | Marko Simić | 7 | 0 | 5+2 | 0 | 0 | 0 | 0 | 0 | 0 | 0 |
| 23 | DF | (Slovenia) SLO | Miha Mevlja | 31 | 1 | 21 | 0 | 0 | 0 | 6 | 0 | 4 | 1 |
| 28 | MF | (Romania) ROU | Andrei Prepeliță | 25 | 1 | 8+9 | 1 | 1 | 0 | 0+4 | 0 | 1+2 | 0 |
| 30 | DF | (Russia) RUS | Fyodor Kudryashov | 36 | 0 | 24 | 0 | 0 | 0 | 8 | 0 | 4 | 0 |
| 33 | FW | (Ukraine) UKR | Marko Dević | 8 | 1 | 1+5 | 1 | 0 | 0 | 0 | 0 | 0+2 | 0 |
| 35 | GK | (Russia) RUS | Soslan Dzhanayev | 23 | 0 | 13 | 0 | 0 | 0 | 10 | 0 | 0 | 0 |
| 40 | DF | (Russia) RUS | Dmitri Khristis | 1 | 0 | 0 | 0 | 1 | 0 | 0 | 0 | 0 | 0 |
| 44 | DF | (Spain) ESP | César Navas | 38 | 1 | 24 | 1 | 0 | 0 | 10 | 0 | 4 | 0 |
| 69 | DF | (Russia) RUS | Nikita Kovalyov | 1 | 0 | 0+1 | 0 | 0 | 0 | 0 | 0 | 0 | 0 |
| 70 | MF | (Russia) RUS | Andrei Sidenko | 1 | 0 | 0 | 0 | 1 | 0 | 0 | 0 | 0 | 0 |
| 71 | MF | (Russia) RUS | Dmitri Veber | 2 | 0 | 0+1 | 0 | 1 | 0 | 0 | 0 | 0 | 0 |
| 77 | GK | (Russia) RUS | Nikita Medvedev | 22 | 0 | 17 | 0 | 1 | 0 | 0 | 0 | 4 | 0 |
| 84 | MF | (Moldova) MDA | Alexandru Gațcan | 37 | 3 | 24 | 3 | 0 | 0 | 10 | 0 | 3 | 0 |
| 89 | MF | (Russia) RUS | Aleksandr Yerokhin | 38 | 5 | 21+4 | 4 | 0 | 0 | 8+1 | 1 | 4 | 0 |
| 90 | MF | (Russia) RUS | Filipp Kondryukov | 1 | 0 | 0 | 0 | 1 | 0 | 0 | 0 | 0 | 0 |
| 99 | MF | (Russia) RUS | Roman Khodunov | 1 | 0 | 0 | 0 | 1 | 0 | 0 | 0 | 0 | 0 |
Players away from the club on loan:
| 6 | MF | (Iran) IRI | Saeid Ezatolahi | 17 | 1 | 5+5 | 0 | 1 | 0 | 1+5 | 1 | 0 | 0 |
| 9 | MF | (Russia) RUS | Maksim Grigoryev | 7 | 0 | 3+3 | 0 | 0 | 0 | 0+1 | 0 | 0 | 0 |
| 10 | MF | (Mali) MLI | Moussa Doumbia | 11 | 0 | 2+4 | 0 | 0 | 0 | 0+5 | 0 | 0 | 0 |
| 14 | MF | (Russia) RUS | Valeri Yaroshenko | 1 | 0 | 0+1 | 0 | 0 | 0 | 0 | 0 | 0 | 0 |
| 17 | DF | (Russia) RUS | Dmitri Skopintsev | 2 | 0 | 0+1 | 0 | 1 | 0 | 0 | 0 | 0 | 0 |
Players who left Rostov during the season:
| 3 | DF | (Senegal) SEN | Papa Gueye | 5 | 0 | 4 | 0 | 1 | 0 | 0 | 0 | 0 | 0 |
| 15 | DF | (Angola) ANG | Bastos | 5 | 0 | 2+1 | 0 | 0 | 0 | 2 | 0 | 0 | 0 |
| 25 | DF | (Russia) RUS | Ivan Novoseltsev | 9 | 1 | 5 | 1 | 0 | 0 | 4 | 0 | 0 | 0 |
| 31 | MF | (Russia) RUS | Ruslan Shapovalov | 1 | 0 | 0 | 0 | 1 | 0 | 0 | 0 | 0 | 0 |

=== Goal scorers ===
| Place | Position | Nation | Number | Name | Russian Premier League | Russian Cup | UEFA Champions League | UEFA Europa League | Total |
|---|---|---|---|---|---|---|---|---|---|
| 1 | FW | (Russia) | 7 | Dmitry Poloz | 7 | 0 | 5 | 2 | 14 |
| 2 | FW | (Iran) | 20 | Sardar Azmoun | 7 | 0 | 4 | 1 | 12 |
| 3 | FW | (Russia) | 11 | Aleksandr Bukharov | 6 | 0 | 0 | 1 | 7 |
| 3 | MF | (Ecuador) | 16 | Christian Noboa | 2 | 0 | 4 | 1 | 7 |
| 5 | FW | (Russia) | 89 | Aleksandr Yerokhin | 4 | 0 | 1 | 0 | 5 |
| 6 | MF | (Moldova) | 84 | Alexandru Gațcan | 3 | 0 | 0 | 0 | 3 |
| 7 | DF | (Russia) | 25 | Ivan Novoseltsev | 2 | 0 | 0 | 0 | 2 |
| 7 | MF | (Iran) | 6 | Saeid Ezatolahi | 1 | 0 | 1 | 0 | 2 |
| 9 | MF | (Romania) | 28 | Andrei Prepeliță | 1 | 0 | 0 | 0 | 1 |
| 9 | DF | (Spain) | 44 | César Navas | 1 | 0 | 0 | 0 | 1 |
| 9 | FW | (Ukraine) | 33 | Marko Dević | 1 | 0 | 0 | 0 | 1 |
| 9 | DF | (Slovenia) | 23 | Miha Mevlja | 0 | 0 | 0 | 1 | 1 |
| 9 | | | | Own goal | 1 | 0 | 0 | 0 | 1 |
| | | | | TOTALS | 36 | 0 | 15 | 6 | 57 |

=== Disciplinary record ===
| Number | Nation | Position | Name | Russian Premier League | | Russian Cup | | UEFA Champions League | | UEFA Europa League | | Total | |
| Number | Nation | Position | Name | Yellow card | Red card | Yellow card | Red card | Yellow card | Red card | Yellow card | Red card | Yellow card | Red card |
| 2 | (Belarus) | MF | Timofei Kalachev | 8 | 0 | 0 | 0 | 2 | 0 | 2 | 0 | 12 | 0 |
| 3 | (Senegal) | DF | Papa Gueye | 3 | 0 | 0 | 0 | 0 | 0 | 0 | 0 | 3 | 0 |
| 4 | (Russia) | DF | Vladimir Granat | 1 | 0 | 0 | 0 | 2 | 0 | 0 | 0 | 3 | 0 |
| 5 | (Russia) | DF | Denis Terentyev | 3 | 0 | 0 | 0 | 2 | 0 | 0 | 0 | 5 | 0 |
| 6 | (Iran) | MF | Saeid Ezatolahi | 2 | 0 | 1 | 0 | 2 | 0 | 0 | 0 | 5 | 0 |
| 7 | (Russia) | FW | Dmitry Poloz | 1 | 0 | 0 | 0 | 1 | 0 | 0 | 0 | 2 | 0 |
| 8 | (Russia) | MF | Igor Kireyev | 2 | 0 | 0 | 0 | 0 | 0 | 0 | 0 | 2 | 0 |
| 11 | (Russia) | FW | Aleksandr Bukharov | 4 | 0 | 0 | 0 | 0 | 0 | 3 | 0 | 7 | 0 |
| 16 | (Ecuador) | MF | Christian Noboa | 2 | 1 | 0 | 0 | 1 | 0 | 1 | 0 | 4 | 1 |
| 19 | (Russia) | MF | Khoren Bayramyan | 4 | 0 | 0 | 0 | 0 | 0 | 0 | 0 | 4 | 0 |
| 20 | (Iran) | FW | Sardar Azmoun | 4 | 1 | 0 | 0 | 2 | 0 | 0 | 0 | 6 | 1 |
| 23 | (Slovenia) | DF | Miha Mevlja | 1 | 0 | 0 | 0 | 1 | 0 | 0 | 0 | 2 | 0 |
| 28 | (Romania) | MF | Andrei Prepeliță | 1 | 0 | 0 | 0 | 0 | 0 | 0 | 0 | 1 | 0 |
| 30 | (Russia) | DF | Fyodor Kudryashov | 3 | 1 | 0 | 0 | 2 | 1 | 0 | 0 | 5 | 2 |
| 35 | (Russia) | GK | Soslan Dzhanayev | 0 | 0 | 0 | 0 | 1 | 0 | 0 | 0 | 1 | 0 |
| 44 | (Spain) | DF | César Navas | 6 | 1 | 0 | 0 | 4 | 0 | 0 | 0 | 10 | 1 |
| 84 | (Moldova) | MF | Alexandru Gațcan | 10 | 3 | 0 | 0 | 4 | 0 | 1 | 0 | 15 | 3 |
| 89 | (Russia) | MF | Aleksandr Yerokhin | 5 | 1 | 0 | 0 | 1 | 0 | 1 | 0 | 7 | 1 |
| 99 | (Russia) | MF | Roman Khodunov | 0 | 0 | 1 | 0 | 0 | 0 | 0 | 0 | 1 | 0 |
| | | | TOTALS | 60 | 8 | 2 | 0 | 25 | 1 | 8 | 0 | 95 | 9 |
