= 2017–18 FC Rostov season =

FC Rostov
2017–18 season
- Chairman: Viktor Goncharov
- Manager: Leonid Kuchuk (9 June-6 December); Dmitri Kirichenko (caretaker) (6-19 December); Valeri Karpin (from 19 December)
- Stadium: Olimp – 2
- Russian Premier League: 11th
- Russian Cup: Round of 16 vs Amkar Perm
- Top goalscorer: League: Aleksei Ionov (5); All: Aleksei Ionov (5)
Home colours	Away colours	Third colours

The 2017–18 FC Rostov season was the club's ninth successive season in the Russian Premier League, the highest tier of football in Russia. Rostov finished the season in 11th place, 2 places and 2 points above the Relegation Playoffs, and reached the Round of 16 in the Russian Cup, where they were eliminated by Amkar Perm.

== Season events ==
On 9 June, Rostov announced Leonid Kuchuk as their new manager on a one-year contract with the option of an additional year. On 6 December, Kuchuk resigned as manager, with Dmitri Kirichenko taking in over in a caretaker capacity the same day. Valeri Karpin was announced as the club's new permanent manager, on a two-and-a-half-year contract on 19 December.

== Squad ==
As of 22 February 2018

Note: Flags indicate national team as defined under FIFA eligibility rules; some limited exceptions apply. Players may hold more than one non-FIFA nationality.

No.	Pos.	Nation	Player
2	MF	BLR	Timofei Kalachev
3	DF	POL	Maciej Wilusz
4	DF	RUS	Sergei Parshivlyuk
5	DF	SLO	Matija Boben
6	DF	ISL	Ragnar Sigurðsson
7	MF	RUS	Artur Yusupov (loan from Zenit)
8	MF	RUS	Ayaz Guliyev (loan from Spartak)
9	FW	ISL	Björn Bergmann Sigurðarson
10	MF	RUS	Aleksandr Zuyev (loan from Spartak)
12	MF	RUS	Aleksei Ionov
14	FW	UZB	Eldor Shomurodov
15	DF	ISL	Sverrir Ingi Ingason
16	DF	RUS	Yevgeni Makeyev

No.	Pos.	Nation	Player
17	MF	MLI	Moussa Doumbia
19	MF	RUS	Khoren Bayramyan
20	MF	SLO	Žan Majer
21	MF	RUS	Aleksandr Sapeta
22	FW	RUS	Vladimir Dyadyun
23	MF	MDA	Valeriu Ciupercă
30	GK	RUS	Sergei Pesyakov
31	GK	RUS	Ilya Abayev
33	DF	RUS	Konstantin Pliyev
77	MF	RUS	Dmitri Skopintsev
84	MF	MDA	Alexandru Gațcan (Captain)
97	GK	RUS	Yevgeni Goshev

=== Out on loan ===
Note: Flags indicate national team as defined under FIFA eligibility rules; some limited exceptions apply. Players may hold more than one non-FIFA nationality.

No.	Pos.	Nation	Player
9	FW	GEO	Nika Kacharava (at Korona Kielce)
22	MF	RUS	Reziuan Mirzov (at Tosno)

No.	Pos.	Nation	Player
23	MF	RUS	Aleksandr Troshechkin (at Tosno)
66	MF	IRI	Saeid Ezatolahi (at Amkar)

== Transfers ==
=== Summer ===
In: Note: Flags indicate national team as defined under FIFA eligibility rules; some limited exceptions apply. Players may hold more than one non-FIFA nationality.

No.	Pos.	Nation	Player
3	DF	POL	Maciej Wilusz (from (Poland) Lech Poznań)
4	DF	RUS	Sergei Parshivlyuk (from (Russia) Anzhi Makhachkala)
5	DF	SLO	Matija Boben (from (Slovenia) Gorica)
7	MF	RUS	Artur Yusupov (on loan from (Russia) Zenit St. Petersburg)
9	MF	RUS	Valeri Yaroshenko (end of loan to (Russia) Baltika Kaliningrad)
10	MF	RUS	Aleksandr Zuyev (on loan from (Russia) Spartak Moscow)
12	MF	RUS	Aleksei Ionov (from (Russia) Dynamo Moscow)
14	FW	UZB	Eldor Shomurodov (from (Uzbekistan) Bunyodkor)
15	DF	ISL	Sverrir Ingi Ingason (from (Spain) Granada)
16	DF	RUS	Yevgeni Makeyev (from (Russia) Spartak Moscow)
17	MF	MLI	Moussa Doumbia (end of loan to (Russia) Arsenal Tula)
20	MF	SLO	Žan Majer (from (Slovenia) Domžale)
22	FW	RUS	Vladimir Dyadyun (from (Russia) Rubin Kazan)
30	GK	RUS	Sergei Pesyakov (from (Russia) Spartak Moscow)
31	GK	RUS	Ilya Abayev (from (Russia) Lokomotiv Moscow)
41	MF	RUS	Vyacheslav Larchenkov
44	MF	ECU	Josimar Quintero (on loan from (England) Chelsea)
73	FW	RUS	Yevgeni Livadnov
81	DF	RUS	Mikhail Osinov
90	MF	RUS	Ivan Danilov
91	DF	RUS	Vitali Ustinov (on loan from (Russia) Rubin Kazan)
92	MF	RUS	Igor Volkov
99	MF	RUS	Andrei Potapov (from (Russia) Arsenal Tula)

Out: Note: Flags indicate national team as defined under FIFA eligibility rules; some limited exceptions apply. Players may hold more than one non-FIFA nationality.

No.	Pos.	Nation	Player
1	GK	RUS	Ivan Komissarov (to (Russia) Armavir)
4	DF	RUS	Vladimir Granat (to (Russia) Rubin Kazan)
5	DF	RUS	Denis Terentyev (to (Russia) Zenit St. Petersburg)
6	MF	IRI	Saeid Ezatolahi (on loan to (Russia) Amkar Perm, previously on loan to (Russia) Anzhi Makhachkala)
8	FW	RUS	Dmitry Poloz (to (Russia) Zenit St. Petersburg)
9	MF	RUS	Maksim Grigoryev (to (Russia) Ural Yekaterinburg)
16	MF	ECU	Christian Noboa (to (Russia) Zenit St. Petersburg)
20	FW	IRI	Sardar Azmoun (to (Russia) Rubin Kazan)
21	DF	RUS	Andrei Sorokin (to (Russia) Sakhalin Yuzhno-Sakhalinsk)
22	DF	MNE	Marko Simić (to (Uzbekistan) Pakhtakor Tashkent)
23	DF	SLO	Miha Mevlja (to (Russia) Zenit St. Petersburg)
28	MF	ROU	Andrei Prepeliță
30	DF	RUS	Fyodor Kudryashov (to (Russia) Rubin Kazan)
32	MF	RUS	Aleksei Stokolyasov
33	FW	UKR	Marko Dević (to (Liechtenstein) Vaduz)
35	GK	RUS	Soslan Dzhanayev (to (Russia) Rubin Kazan)
40	DF	RUS	Dmitri Khristis
43	MF	RUS	Ismail Gasanov
44	DF	ESP	César Navas (to (Russia) Rubin Kazan)
45	DF	RUS	Anton Lazutkin
56	MF	RUS	Artyom Sobol
69	DF	RUS	Nikita Kovalyov
70	MF	RUS	Andrei Sidenko
73	MF	RUS	Ilya Zakharov
77	GK	RUS	Nikita Medvedev (to (Russia) Lokomotiv Moscow)
89	MF	RUS	Aleksandr Yerokhin (to (Russia) Zenit St. Petersburg)
90	MF	RUS	Filipp Kondryukov
99	MF	RUS	Roman Khodunov (to (Russia) Akademiya Futbola Rostov-on-Don)
—	MF	RUS	Reziuan Mirzov (on loan to (Russia) Tosno, from (Russia) Akhmat Grozny)
—	MF	RUS	Aleksandr Troshechkin (on loan to (Russia) Tosno, previously on loan to (Russia) Fakel Voronezh)
—	FW	GEO	Nika Kacharava (on loan to (Poland) Korona Kielce, previously on loan to (Cyprus) Ethnikos Achna)

=== Winter ===
In: Note: Flags indicate national team as defined under FIFA eligibility rules; some limited exceptions apply. Players may hold more than one non-FIFA nationality.

No.	Pos.	Nation	Player
6	DF	ISL	Ragnar Sigurðsson (from (England) Fulham)
8	MF	RUS	Ayaz Guliyev (on loan from (Russia) Spartak Moscow)
9	FW	ISL	Björn Bergmann Sigurðarson (from (Norway) Molde)
21	MF	RUS	Aleksandr Sapeta (from (Russia) Dynamo Moscow)
23	MF	MDA	Valeriu Ciupercă (from (Russia) Baltika Kaliningrad)
33	DF	RUS	Konstantin Pliyev (from (Russia) Volgar Astrakhan)
63	DF	RUS	Aleksandr Zakharov
76	MF	RUS	Elvin Talibov
77	MF	RUS	Dmitri Skopintsev (end of loan to (Russia) Baltika Kaliningrad)
78	DF	RUS	Roman Petrov
82	MF	RUS	Nikita Kryukov

Out: Note: Flags indicate national team as defined under FIFA eligibility rules; some limited exceptions apply. Players may hold more than one non-FIFA nationality.

No.	Pos.	Nation	Player
8	MF	RUS	Igor Kireyev (to (Russia) Avangard Kursk)
9	MF	RUS	Valeri Yaroshenko
11	FW	RUS	Aleksandr Bukharov
18	MF	RUS	Pavel Mogilevets (to (Russia) Rubin Kazan)
44	MF	ECU	Josimar Quintero (end of loan from (England) Chelsea)
62	GK	RUS	Artyom Yesaulenko (to (Russia) Chayka Peschanokopskoye)
91	DF	RUS	Vitali Ustinov (end of loan from (Russia) Rubin Kazan)
94	DF	RUS	Igor Cherkasov

=== Trialist ===
Date From	Date To	Position	Nationality	Name	Last Club
15 June 2017		GK	(Russia)	Oleg Baklov	Syzran-2003
16 June 2017		DF	(Ivory Coast)	Cédric Gogoua	Riga
18 June 2017		DF	(Russia)	Sergei Obivalin	Atlantas
18 June 2017		DF	(Russia)	Andrius Rukas	Arsenal Tula
6 July 2017		DF	(Russia)	Vitali Ustinov	Rubin Kazan
2 July 2017		FW	(Ghana)	Ernest Antwi	União de Leiria
2 July 2017		FW	(Russia)	Vladimir Dyadyun	Rubin Kazan

== Friendlies ==
16 June 2017	Triglav Kranj (Slovenia)	1 – 0	(Russia) Rostov	Austria
18:00 MSK (UTC+3)	80'	Report

22 June 2017	Videoton (Hungary)	1 – 0	(Russia) Rostov	Austria
17:00 MSK (UTC+3)	Goal	Report

2 July 2017	Kukësi (Albania)	1 – 0	(Russia) Rostov	Austria
12:30 MSK (UTC+3)		Report

2 July 2017	Mladá Boleslav (Czech Republic)	v	(Russia) Rostov	Austria
18:00 MSK (UTC+3)

8 July 2017	v	(Russia) Rostov	Austria
11:30 MSK (UTC+3)

8 July 2017	Brøndby (Denmark)	v	(Russia) Rostov	Austria
18:30 MSK (UTC+3)

== Competitions ==
=== Russian Premier League ===
==== Results by round ====
Round	1	2	3	4	5	6	7	8	9	10	11	12	13	14	15	16	17	18	19	20	21	22	23	24	25	26	27	28	29	30
Ground	A	H	A	A	H	A	H	A	H	A	H	A	H	A	H	A	H	H	A	H	A	H	A	H	A	H	A	H	A	H
Result	D	L	W	W	W	W	D	D	D	L	L	L	L	D	D	L	D	W	L	W	L	D	D	L	L	W	D	W	L	W
Position	8	12	8	6	4	2	3	3	5	5	6	7	11	11	11	11	11	10	10	10	9	10	10	12	13	12	12	12	12	11

Updated to match(es) played on 13 May 2018. Source: See Results
A = Away; H = Home; W = Win; D = Draw; L = Loss

==== Results ====
15 July 2017 1	Ural Yekaterinburg	1 – 1	Rostov	Yekaterinburg
15:00 MSK (UTC+3)	Dimitrov 41' (pen.)	Report	Ustinov (yellow card) 50'; Gațcan 60'; Yusupov (yellow card) 73'	Stadium: SKB-Bank Arena; Attendance: 6,846; Referee: Sergey Lapochkin

23 July 2017 2	Rostov	0 – 1	Akhmat Grozny	Rostov-on-Don
20:00 MSK (UTC+3)	Doumbia (yellow card) 90+5'	Report	Sampaio (yellow card) 27'; Jabá (yellow card) 40'; Sadayev 54'; Rodolfo (yellow card) 61'; Berisha (yellow card) 90+1'	Stadium: Olimp-2; Attendance: 10,305; Referee: Roman Galimov

30 July 2017 3	Amkar Perm	0 – 1	Rostov	Perm
15:00 MSK (UTC+3)	Gol (yellow card) 90+2'	Report	Zuyev 66'; Yusupov (yellow card) 81'	Stadium: Zvezda Stadium; Attendance: 4,900; Referee: Aleksei Nikolaev

4 August 2017 4	Anzhi Makhachkala	0 – 1	Rostov	Kaspiysk
20:00 MSK (UTC+3)	Yakovlev (yellow card) 32'; Markelov (yellow card) 42'; Musalov (yellow card) 62'	Report	Dyadyun 19'; Ustinov (yellow card) 34'; Gațcan (yellow card) 46'; Pesyakov (yellow card) 88'; Mogilevets (yellow card) 90+2'	Stadium: Anzhi Arena; Attendance: 5,690; Referee: Igor Fedotov

9 August 2017 5	Rostov	1 – 0	Dynamo Moscow	Rostov-on-Don
20:00 MSK (UTC+3)	Gațcan (yellow card) 15'; Kalachev 19' (pen.); Bayramyan (yellow card) 21'; Ingason (yellow card) 26'; Parshivlyuk (yellow card) 56'	Report	Sow (yellow card) 11'; Terekhov (yellow card) 17'; Katrich (yellow card) 21'	Stadium: Olimp-2; Attendance: 10,215; Referee: Sergey Lapochkin

12 August 2017 6	Ufa	1 – 4	Rostov	Ufa
15:00 MSK (UTC+3)	Stotsky (yellow card) 47'; Bezdenezhnykh (yellow card) 51'; Vaněk 55'	Report	Gațcan 57'; Kalachev 64' (pen.), 66'; Mevlja 77'	Stadium: Neftyanik Stadium; Attendance: 5,626; Referee: Aleksei Matyunin

20 August 2017 7	Rostov	0 – 0	Krasnodar	Rostov-on-Don
20:00 MSK (UTC+3)	Dyadyun (yellow card) 42'	Report	Martynovich (yellow card) 35'	Stadium: Olimp-2; Attendance: 12,328; Referee: Mikhail Vilkov

27 August 2017 8	Zenit St.Petersburg	0 – 0	Rostov	Saint Petersburg
20:00 MSK (UTC+3)	Poloz (yellow card) 78'	Report		Stadium: Krestovsky Stadium; Attendance: 50,404; Referee: Vladimir Seldyakov

9 September 2017 9	Rostov	2 – 2	Arsenal Tula	Rostov-on-Don
16:30 MSK (UTC+3)	Yusupov 7'; Kalachev 85' (pen.)	Report	Đorđević 32', 70'; Maksimov (yellow card) 52'; Belyayev (yellow card) 84'; Čaušić (yellow card) 86'	Stadium: Olimp-2; Attendance: 10,856; Referee: Aleksei Nikolaev

16 September 2017 10	CSKA Moscow	2 – 0	Rostov	Moscow
16:30 MSK (UTC+3)	Berezutski 30'; Golovin (yellow card) 56'; Vitinho 68'	Report	Yusupov (yellow card) 39'; Gațcan (yellow card) 57'	Stadium: VEB Arena; Attendance: 15,144; Referee: Vladimir Moskalyov

24 September 2017 11	Rostov	0 – 1	Lokomotiv Moscow	Rostov-on-Don
16:30 MSK (UTC+3)	Yusupov (yellow card) 35'	Report	Tarasov (yellow card) 53'; An.Miranchuk (yellow card) 72'; Eder 90+3'	Stadium: Olimp-2; Attendance: 12,198; Referee: Roman Galimov

30 September 2017 12	SKA-Khabarovsk	2 – 1	Rostov	Khabarovsk
11:30 MSK (UTC+3)	Marković 17'; Ediyev (yellow card) 35'; Dedechko 71'; Kazankov (yellow card) 73'	Report	Wilusz (yellow card) 21'; Ustinov 45'; Makeyev (yellow card) 51'; Gațcan (yellow card) 58'; Bukharov (yellow card) 90'	Stadium: Lenin Stadium; Attendance: 6,535; Referee: Igor Fedotov

15 October 2017 13	Rostov	0 – 1	Rubin Kazan	Rostov-on-Don
16:30 MSK (UTC+3)	Dyadyun (yellow card) 57'; Ionov (yellow card) 88'	Report	Granat (yellow card) 44'; Nabiullin (yellow card) 59'; M'Vila 67'; Sigurðsson (yellow card) 70'	Stadium: Olimp-2; Attendance: 8,683; Referee: Aleksei Eskov

21 October 2017 14	Tosno	1 – 1	Rostov	Saint Petersburg
14:00 MSK (UTC+3)	Markov 17'; Chernov (yellow card) 21'; Rocha (yellow card) 33'; Dugalić (yellow card) 72'	Report	Pesyakov (yellow card) 33'; Ingason 56' (pen.)	Stadium: Petrovsky Stadium; Attendance: 4,820; Referee: Vladimir Moskalyov

28 October 2017 15	Rostov	2 – 2	Spartak Moscow	Rostov-on-Don
19:00 MSK (UTC+3)	Ionov 20'; Bukharov (yellow card) 76'; Wilusz 87'	Report	Fernando 31'; Glushakov 34'; Tasci (yellow card) 65'	Stadium: Olimp-2; Attendance: 9,820; Referee: Roman Galimov

4 November 2017 16	Akhmat Grozny	1 – 0	Rostov	Grozny
19:00 MSK (UTC+3)	Ismael (yellow card) 41'; Mbengue 50'; Utsiyev (yellow card) 59'; Roshi (yellow card) 85'	Report	Gațcan (yellow card) 90+2'; Ustinov (yellow card) 90+3'	Stadium: Akhmat-Arena; Attendance: 12,487; Referee: Vladimir Seldyakov

19 November 2017 17	Rostov	0 – 0	Amkar Perm	Rostov-on-Don
16:30 MSK (UTC+3)	Gațcan (yellow card) 33'; Ingason (penalty missed) 79'	Report	Zaytsev (yellow card) 27'; Belorukov (yellow card) 65'; Idowu (yellow card) 79'; Sivakow (penalty missed) 90+2'	Stadium: Olimp-2; Attendance: 5,135; Referee: Evgeny Turbin

26 November 2017 18	Rostov	2 – 0	Anzhi Makhachkala	Rostov-on-Don
16:30 MSK (UTC+3)	Majer (yellow card) 30'; Bukharov 44' (pen.), 58'; Gațcan (yellow card) 81'; Ingason (yellow card) 90+1'	Report	Lescano (yellow card) 90+1'	Stadium: Olimp-2; Attendance: 4,252; Referee: Mikhail Vilkov

2 December 2017 19	Dynamo Moscow	2 – 0	Rostov	Khimki
14:00 MSK (UTC+3)	Temnikov (yellow card) 12'; Bećiraj 42'; Tashayev 45'; Rykov (yellow card) 58'	Report	Kalachev (yellow card) 25'; Makeyev (yellow card) 71'	Stadium: Arena Khimki; Attendance: 3,250; Referee: Vitali Meshkov

10 December 2017 20	Rostov	1 – 0	Ufa	Rostov-on-Don
19:00 MSK (UTC+3)	Ingason 22'; Pesyakov (yellow card) 90+3'	Report	Salatić (yellow card) 73'; Sly (yellow card) 90+1'	Stadium: Olimp-2; Attendance: 7,834; Referee: Vladimir Moskalyov

3 March 2018 21	Krasnodar	3 – 1	Rostov	Krasnodar
19:00 MSK (UTC+3)	Smolov 28', 60' (pen.); Mamayev 89'	Report	Ionov 45' (pen.); Zuyev (yellow card) 90+1'	Stadium: Krasnodar Stadium; Attendance: 31,388; Referee: Sergei Karasev

11 March 2018 22	Rostov	0 – 0	Zenit St.Petersburg	Rostov-on-Don
14:00 MSK (UTC+3)	Sapeta (yellow card) 36'; Gațcan (yellow card) 67'	Report	Driussi (yellow card) 8'; Ivanović (yellow card) 43'; Ozdoyev (yellow card) 88'	Stadium: Olimp-2; Attendance: 12,873; Referee: Aleksei Eskov

17 March 2018 23	Arsenal Tula	2 – 2	Rostov	Tula
14:00 MSK (UTC+3)	Dzyuba 14', 59'; Aleksandrov (yellow card) 16'; Gorbatenko (yellow card) 56'; Álvarez (yellow card) 87'	Report	Ionov 8', 31'; Sapeta (yellow card) 31'; Zuyev (yellow card) 72'	Stadium: Arsenal Stadium; Attendance: 7,760; Referee: Sergey Lapochkin

1 April 2018 24	Rostov	1 – 2	CSKA Moscow	Rostov-on-Don
19:00 MSK (UTC+3)	Ingason (yellow card) 9' (goal) 61'; Kalachev (yellow card) 32'; Sapeta (yellow card) 76'	Report	Nababkin (yellow card) 32'; Shchennikov 44'; Wernbloom 75'	Stadium: Olimp-2; Attendance: 13,773; Referee: Roman Galimov

8 April 2018 25	Lokomotiv Moscow	1 – 0	Rostov	Moscow
16:30 MSK (UTC+3)	Farfán (yellow card) 28' (goal) 47'; Rybus (yellow card) 40'; Eder (yellow card) 90+4'	Report	Kalachev (yellow card) 64'; Ionov (yellow card) 84'; Ingason (yellow card) 90+2'; Gațcan (yellow card) 90+4'; Skopintsev (yellow card) 90+4'	Stadium: RZD Arena; Attendance: 12,478; Referee: Evgeny Turbin

15 April 2018 26	Rostov	2 – 0	SKA-Khabarovsk	Rostov-on-Don
19:00 MSK (UTC+3)	Sigurðarson 40'; Kalachev (yellow card) 85'; Bayramyan 89'	Report	Kazankov (yellow card) 70'; Ediyev (yellow card) 88'	Stadium: Rostov Arena; Attendance: 12,736; Referee: Vladimir Moskalyov

21 April 2018 27	Rubin Kazan	1 – 1	Rostov	Kazan
16:30 MSK (UTC+3)	Noboa 40'	Report	Parshivlyuk 67'	Stadium: Kazan Arena; Attendance: 5,820; Referee: Vladislav Bezborodov

29 April 2018 28	Rostov	2 – 0	Tosno	Rostov-on-Don
19:00 MSK (UTC+3)	Guliyev (yellow card) 55'; Wilusz (yellow card) 63'; Shomurodov 67', 72'	Report	Makarov (yellow card) 2' (yellow-red card) 26'; Galiulin (yellow card) 35'; Dugalić (yellow card) 68'	Stadium: Rostov Arena; Attendance: 22,456; Referee: Aleksei Matyunin

5 May 2018 29	Spartak Moscow	2 – 0	Rostov	Moscow
19:00 MSK (UTC+3)	Yeshchenko (yellow card) 73'; Melgarejo 79' (yellow card) 80'; Promes 84'	Report	Bayramyan (yellow card) 26' (yellow-red card) 90+3'; Abayev (yellow card) 38'; Skopintsev (yellow card) 57'	Stadium: Otkritie Arena; Attendance: 35,802; Referee: Sergey Lapochkin

13 May 2018 30	Rostov	1 – 0	Ural Yekaterinburg	Rostov-on-Don
14:00 MSK (UTC+3)	Ionov 57'	Report	Fidler (yellow card) 41'; Haroyan (yellow card) 88'	Stadium: Rostov Arena; Attendance: 37,483; Referee: Mikhail Vilkov

==== League table ====
Pos	Team	Pld	W	D	L	GF	GA	GD	Pts	Qualification or relegation
9	Akhmat Grozny	30	10	9	11	30	34	−4	39	
10	Rubin Kazan	30	9	11	10	32	25	+7	38	
11	Rostov	30	9	10	11	27	28	−1	37 (Note: Head-to-head: Rostov 1–0 Ural, Ural 1–1 Rostov)	
12	Ural Yekaterinburg	30	8	13	9	31	32	−1	37	
13	Amkar Perm (D)	30	9	8	13	20	30	−10	35	Dissolved after the season (Note: On 13 June 2018, FC Amkar Perm announced that the Russian Football Union recalled their 2018–19 season license, making them ineligible for the Russian Premier League or Russian Football National League. On 18 June 2018, club president Gennadi Shilov announced that the club will not register for the third-tier Russian Professional Football League and will be dissolved. As a consequence, Anzhi Makhachkala was not relegated.)

Updated to match(es) played on 13 May 2018. Source: Russian Premier League, Soccerway
Rules for classification: 1) Points; 2) Head-to-head points; 3) Head-to-head matches won; 4) Head-to-head goal difference; 5) Head-to-head goals scored; 6) Head-to-head away goals; 7) Matches won; 8) Goal difference; 9) Goals scored; 10) Away goals scored.
(D) Dissolved after the season

=== Russian Cup ===
20 September 2017 Round of 32	Volgar Astrakhan	0 – 2	Rostov	Astrakhan
18:00 MSK (UTC+3)	Verkashanskiy (yellow card) 76'	Report	Zuyev 22'; Bukharov 48'; Majer (yellow card) 64'; Gațcan (yellow card) 79'	Stadium: Central Stadium; Attendance: 6,000; Referee: Aleksey Sukhoy

25 October 2017 Round of 16	Rostov	1 – 1 (a.e.t.) (9 – 10 p)	Amkar Perm	Rostov-on-Don
18:30 MSK (UTC+3)	Parshivlyuk 39'	Report	Idowu 16'; Condé (yellow card) 109'	Stadium: Olimp-2; Attendance: 4,827; Referee: Aleksey Sukhoy
	Penalties
	Shomurodov (penalty scored); Bukharov (penalty scored); Doumbia (penalty missed); Ingason (penalty scored); Gațcan (penalty missed); Majer (penalty scored); Parshivlyuk (penalty scored); Makeyev (penalty scored); Wilusz (penalty scored); Ustinov (penalty scored); Pesyakov (penalty scored); Shomurodov (penalty missed)		Bodul (penalty missed); Balanovich (penalty scored); Melnikov (penalty scored); Prokofyev (penalty missed); Sivakow (penalty scored); Ogude (penalty scored); Belorukov (penalty scored); Condé (penalty scored); Zaytsev (penalty scored); Miljković (penalty scored); Nigmatullin (penalty scored); Bodul (penalty scored)

== Squad statistics ==
As of match played 13 May 2018

=== Appearances and goals ===
No.	Pos	Nat	Player	Total		Premier League		Russian Cup	
No.	Pos	Nat	Player	Apps	Goals	Apps	Goals	Apps	Goals
2	MF	(Belarus) BLR	Timofei Kalachev	25	4	20+5	4	0	0
3	DF	(Poland) POL	Maciej Wilusz	27	1	26	1	1	0
4	DF	(Russia) RUS	Sergei Parshivlyuk	31	2	28+1	1	2	1
5	DF	(Slovenia) SLO	Matija Boben	8	0	6+1	0	1	0
6	DF	(Iceland) ISL	Ragnar Sigurðsson	9	0	9	0	0	0
7	MF	(Russia) RUS	Artur Yusupov	16	1	13+3	1	0	0
8	MF	(Russia) RUS	Ayaz Guliyev	6	0	3+3	0	0	0
9	FW	(Iceland) ISL	Björn Bergmann Sigurðarson	6	1	6	1	0	0
10	MF	(Russia) RUS	Aleksandr Zuyev	27	2	7+18	1	2	1
11	FW	(Russia) RUS	Aleksandr Bukharov	15	3	9+4	2	2	1
12	MF	(Russia) RUS	Aleksei Ionov	22	5	17+4	5	1	0
14	FW	(Uzbekistan) UZB	Eldor Shomurodov	20	2	7+11	2	0+2	0
15	DF	(Iceland) ISL	Sverrir Ingi Ingason	30	3	28	3	2	0
16	DF	(Russia) RUS	Yevgeni Makeyev	18	0	13+3	0	1+1	0
17	MF	(Mali) MLI	Moussa Doumbia	20	0	7+11	0	1+1	0
18	MF	(Russia) RUS	Pavel Mogilevets	14	0	10+2	0	1+1	0
19	MF	(Russia) RUS	Khoren Bayramyan	17	1	11+5	1	1	0
20	MF	(Slovenia) SLO	Žan Majer	15	0	9+4	0	2	0
21	MF	(Russia) RUS	Aleksandr Sapeta	5	0	5	0	0	0
22	FW	(Russia) RUS	Vladimir Dyadyun	16	1	10+6	1	0	0
23	MF	(Moldova) MDA	Valeriu Ciupercă	1	0	1	0	0	0
30	GK	(Russia) RUS	Sergei Pesyakov	20	0	18	0	2	0
31	GK	(Russia) RUS	Ilya Abayev	13	0	12+1	0	0	0
33	MF	(Russia) RUS	Konstantin Pliyev	1	0	0+1	0	0	0
77	MF	(Russia) RUS	Dmitri Skopintsev	10	0	7+3	0	0	0
84	MF	(Moldova) MDA	Alexandru Gațcan	28	2	25+1	2	2	0
91	DF	(Russia) RUS	Vitali Ustinov	15	1	14	1	1	0
Players away from the club on loan:
Players who left Rostov during the season:
8	MF	(Russia) RUS	Igor Kireyev	3	0	1+2	0	0	0
23	DF	(Slovenia) SLO	Miha Mevlja	8	1	8	1	0	0
44	MF	(Ecuador) ECU	Josimar Quintero	1	0	0	0	0+1	0

=== Goal scorers ===
Place	Position	Nation	Number	Name	Russian Premier League	Russian Cup	Total
1	MF	(Russia)	12	Aleksei Ionov	5	0	5
2	MF	(Belarus)	2	Timofei Kalachev	4	0	4
3	DF	(Iceland)	15	Sverrir Ingi Ingason	3	0	3
3	FW	(Russia)	11	Aleksandr Bukharov	2	1	3
5	MF	(Moldova)	84	Alexandru Gațcan	2	0	2
5	FW	(Uzbekistan)	14	Eldor Shomurodov	2	0	2
5	MF	(Russia)	10	Aleksandr Zuyev	1	1	2
5	DF	(Russia)	4	Sergei Parshivlyuk	1	1	2
9	FW	(Russia)	22	Vladimir Dyadyun	1	0	1
9	DF	(Slovenia)	23	Miha Mevlja	1	0	1
9	MF	(Russia)	7	Artur Yusupov	1	0	1
9	DF	(Russia)	91	Vitali Ustinov	1	0	1
9	DF	(Poland)	3	Maciej Wilusz	1	0	1
9	FW	(Iceland)	9	Björn Bergmann Sigurðarson	1	0	1
9	MF	(Russia)	19	Khoren Bayramyan	1	0	1
				TOTALS	27	2	29

=== Disciplinary record ===
Number	Nation	Position	Name	Russian Premier League		Russian Cup		Total	
Number	Nation	Position	Name	Yellow card	Red card	Yellow card	Red card	Yellow card	Red card
2	(Belarus)	MF	Timofei Kalachev	4	0	0	0	4	0
3	(Poland)	DF	Maciej Wilusz	2	0	0	0	2	0
4	(Russia)	DF	Sergei Parshivlyuk	1	0	0	0	1	0
7	(Russia)	MF	Artur Yusupov	4	0	0	0	4	0
8	(Russia)	MF	Ayaz Guliyev	1	0	0	0	1	0
10	(Russia)	MF	Aleksandr Zuyev	2	0	0	0	2	0
11	(Russia)	FW	Aleksandr Bukharov	2	0	0	0	2	0
12	(Russia)	MF	Aleksei Ionov	2	0	0	0	2	0
15	(Iceland)	DF	Sverrir Ingi Ingason	4	0	0	0	4	0
16	(Russia)	DF	Yevgeni Makeyev	2	0	0	0	2	0
17	(Mali)	MF	Moussa Doumbia	1	0	0	0	1	0
18	(Russia)	MF	Pavel Mogilevets	1	0	0	0	1	0
19	(Russia)	MF	Khoren Bayramyan	3	1	0	0	3	1
20	(Slovenia)	MF	Žan Majer	1	0	2	0	3	0
21	(Russia)	MF	Aleksandr Sapeta	3	0	0	0	3	0
22	(Russia)	FW	Vladimir Dyadyun	2	0	0	0	2	0
30	(Russia)	GK	Sergei Pesyakov	3	0	0	0	3	0
31	(Russia)	GK	Ilya Abayev	1	0	0	0	1	0
77	(Russia)	MF	Dmitri Skopintsev	2	0	0	0	2	0
84	(Moldova)	MF	Alexandru Gațcan	9	0	1	0	10	0
91	(Russia)	DF	Vitali Ustinov	3	0	0	0	3	0
			TOTALS	53	1	3	0	56	1
