= Saeid Ezatolahi =

Iranian footballer (born 1996)

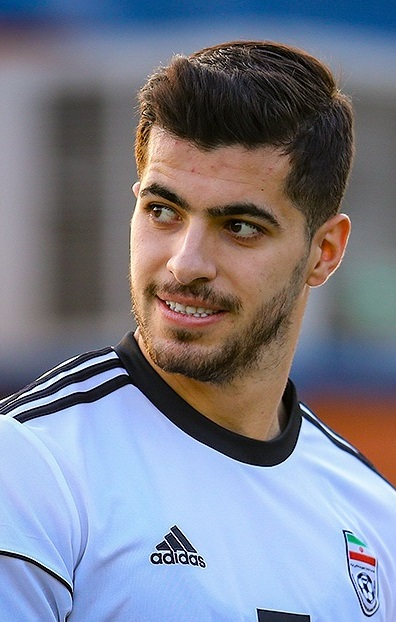
- Ezatolahi with Iran in 2018

Personal information
- Full name: Saeid Ezatolahi Afagh
- Date of birth: 1 October 1996 (age 30)
- Place of birth: Bandar-e Anzali, Iran
- Height: 1.90 m (6 ft 3 in)
- Position: Defensive midfielder

Team information
- Current team: Shabab Al Ahli
- Number: 6

Youth career
- 2008–2010: Shahrdari Bandar Anzali
- 2010–2014: Malavan
- 2014–2015: Atlético Madrid

Senior career*
| Years | Team | Apps | (Gls) |
| 2012–2014 | Malavan | 19 | (0) |
| 2014–2015 | Atlético Madrid C | 5 | (0) |
| 2015–2020 | Rostov | 18 | (2) |
| 2017 | → Anzhi Makhachkala (loan) | 11 | (0) |
| 2017–2018 | → Amkar Perm (loan) | 16 | (1) |
| 2018–2019 | → Reading (loan) | 4 | (0) |
| 2019–2020 | → Eupen (loan) | 4 | (0) |
| 2020–2024 | Vejle | 73 | (8) |
| 2022 | → Al-Gharafa (loan) | 4 | (0) |
| 2024– | Shabab Al Ahli | 54 | (13) |

International career^{‡}
| 2011–2013 | Iran U17 | 33 | (10) |
| 2014 | Iran U20 | 4 | (1) |
| 2015– | Iran | 90 | (2) |
Medal record
Representing Iran
CAFA Nations Cup
| Winner | 2023 Kyrgyzstan – Uzbekistan | Team |
- * Club domestic league appearances and goals as of 16 May 2026 ‡ National team caps and goals as of 17 November 2026

Saeid Ezatolahi Afagh (Persian: سعید عزت‌اللهی آفاق; born 1 October 1996) is an Iranian professional footballer who plays as a defensive midfielder for club Shabab Al Ahli in UAE Pro League and the Iran national team.

Ezatolahi came up through Malavan's youth academy and impressed from an early age, making his first team debut in 2012 and being the Iran Pro League's youngest ever player at the age of 16. Ezatolahi has earned several accolades, including the Iranian federation's young player of the year award. In 2014, he was named one of the most talented football players according to Wonderkids.

Ezatolahi became the youngest goalscorer in the history of the Iran national football team at the age of 19 years and 42 days after scoring in a 3–1 victory against Turkmenistan on 12 November 2015. This record was broken by 17-year-old Allahyar Sayyadmanesh on 6 June 2019.

== Club career ==
=== Early years ===
Ezatolahi's father, Nader, and uncle Ghader Ezatolahi played for Malavan in the Takht Jamshid Cup. Saeid started his career with Shahrdari Bandar Anzali in 2008 as a youth player.

=== Malavan ===
He moved to the Malavan youth academy in the summer of 2010 and was promoted to the first team in July 2012.

==== 2012–13 ====
Ezatolahi made his debut against Rah Ahan on 26 October 2012 as a substitute just 25 days after his 16th birthday, making him the youngest ever player in the history of the Iran Pro League. At the end of the season, Tehran giants Esteghlal reportedly made an offer for him. He was also awarded the prize for young player of the year.

==== 2013–14 ====
He made his season debut as a regular starter against Saba Qom. After giving an impressive performance at the 2013 FIFA U-17 World Cup in October 2013, European clubs like Besiktas, Lugano and Lausanne Sport were reported to follow the youngster closely. In December 2013, Ezatolahi seemed to be on his way to Brazilian Serie A club Atlético Paranaense, which was rapidly denied by his management. In the first week of December 2013, Rubin Kazan showed concrete interest in Ezatolahi by sending an invitation letter.

==== 2014–15 ====
Ezatolahi was enrolled for Malavan's 2014–15 squad, but he did not play any matches due to finalizing his contract with Atlético.

=== Atlético Madrid ===
==== 2014–15 ====
On 27 August 2014, Ezatolahi signed a one-year contract with Spanish side Atlético Madrid, with an option to extend for four-years following the end of the 2014–15 season. He competed in the 2014–15 División de Honor Juvenil de Fútbol for Atlético Madrid. He started in a 4–2 league debut win over Alcorcón on 29 November 2014. He was also added to Atlético's 2014–15 UEFA Youth League squad. He scored his first goal in a 3–1 victory against UDC Sur. On 14 February 2015, he scored in a 4–1 win over CF Rayo Majadahonda. Ezatolahi made his UEFA Youth League debut on 10 March 2015 in the quarter-finals, playing the full 90 minutes against Chelsea.

In April 2015, Ezatolahi practiced with the senior Atlético Madrid team with manager Diego Simeone. On 12 April 2015, Ezatolahi made his debut for Atlético Madrid C in the Tercera Division, playing 30 minutes in a 1–0 loss to Parla. On 3 May 2015, Ezatolahi assisted a goal in Atlético Madrid C's 1–1 draw against Alcorcón B. Ezatolahi's good performances with Atlético Madrid C drew interest from La Liga club Getafe CF.

=== Rostov ===
==== 2015–16 ====
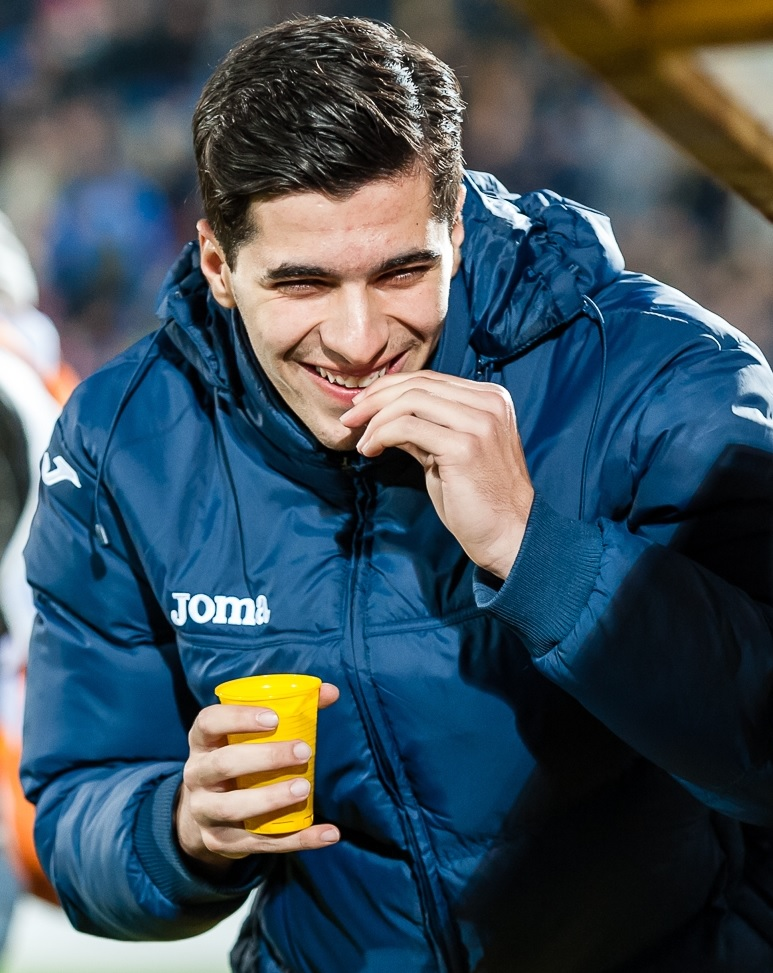
Ezatolahi before a Rostov match.

At the end of the 2014–15 season, Ezatolahi chose not to sign with Atlético Madrid B, and on 21 July 2015, Ezatolahi joined international teammate Sardar Azmoun at Russian Premier League club Rostov with a four-year contract. Due to Visa issues, he could not play for Rostov until 2016, and in January 2016, Ezatolahi's Visa issues were resolved. He made his debut for the club on 2 February 2016 playing in a 3–0 friendly win against Chinese side Jiangsu Sainty. Ezatolahi scored his first goal for Rostov on 27 February 2016 in a 2–0 friendly win against Norwegian side Stabæk.

Ezatolahi made his first team debut for Rostov on 12 May 2016 in a 3–1 victory against FC Dynamo Moscow.

==== 2016–17 ====
On 26 July 2016, Ezatolahi made his first start for Rostov in an official game in the first leg of the 2016–17 UEFA Champions League third qualifying round against R.S.C. Anderlecht and scored a goal in the 16th minute, equalizing the score to 1–1. In the second half of the game, another shot by him from outside of the box was denied by the crossbar, and the game ended with a score of 2–2. He is the first scorer of the club in a European match (not counting the UEFA Intertoto Cup) and also the youngest ever Iranian player to score at the Champions League. He scored his first Russian Premier League goal for Rostov on 20 August 2016 in a 3–0 victory over FC Tom Tomsk.

His contract with FC Rostov expired in 2016. His agent Mehdi Hagitali said his new team would be a team where he would consistently play. FC Rostov removed him from their Russian Premier League roster on 31 December 2016.

==== Anzhi Makhachkala (loan) ====
In February 2017, Ezatolahi was loaned to Russian Premier League side Anzhi Makhachkala for six months. Ezatolahi made his first appearance for the club on 8 February 2017, coming on as a second-half substitute in a friendly against Dukla Prague. On 24 February 2017, he officially signed a new contract with FC Rostov and finalized the loan deal with Anzhi. In his first league game for Anzhi against FC Rubin Kazan on 6 March 2017, he was sent-off in the 77th minute after receiving two yellow cards, with his team conceding a goal in an 0–1 loss shortly after. During his loan, he started in only three league games out of 13 that Anzhi played in that span, making additional seven appearances as a substitute, with Anzhi achieving its objective of avoiding relegation from the Russian Premier League.

==== Amkar Perm (loan) ====
Upon returning from the Anzhi loan, he didn't make any appearances for FC Rostov in the first eight games of the season, and on 31 August 2017, he joined FC Amkar Perm on loan until the end of the 2017–18 season. He made his first appearance for Amkar on 21 September 2017 in a Russian Cup match.

The loan contract is reportedly worth €1.3 million.

==== Reading (loan) ====
On 31 August 2018, Reading announced the signing of Ezatolahi on a season-long loan deal from Rostov. He had a couple of man of the match performances in his first few games before an unfortunate season-ending injury.

==== Eupen (loan) ====
On 28 August 2019, he moved on loan to the Belgian club Eupen.

In June 2020, he returned to Rostov and became a free agent when his contract expired later that month.

=== Vejle ===
On 20 August 2020, Ezatolahi signed a three-year deal with newly promoted Danish Superliga club Vejle Boldklub.

On 19 January 2022, he was sent on a six-month loan to Qatar Stars League club Al-Gharafa.

== International career ==
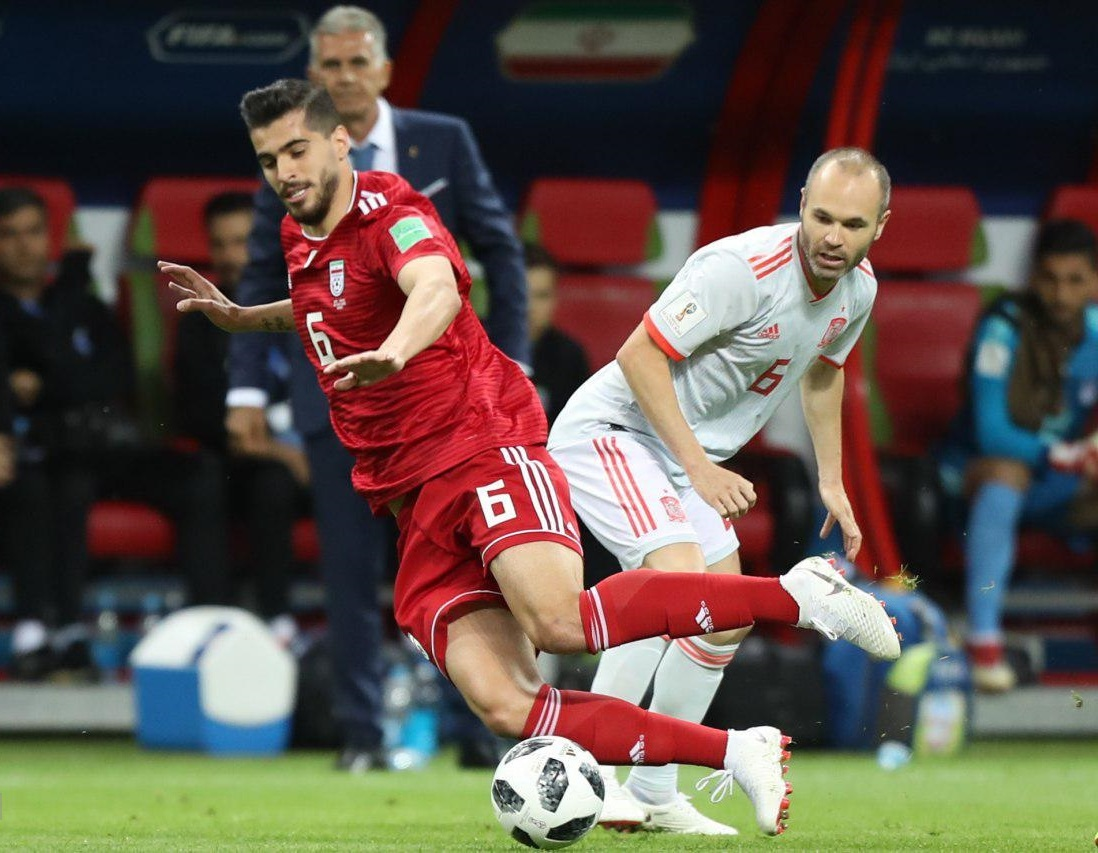
Ezatolahi playing for Iran against Andrés Iniesta's Spain in 2018 FIFA World Cup

=== Youth ===
Saeid Ezatolahi participated with the Iran U17 national team in all group matches as well as the round of 16 in the 2013 FIFA U-17 World Cup.

He was invited to the Iran U20 by Ali Doustimehr. He scored his first goal against the United Arab Emirates. Ezatolahi played two matches for Iran during the 2014 AFC U-19 Championship.

As the 2016 AFC U-23 Championship was not held during the FIFA International Match Calendar, Ezatolahi was not released by Rostov.

=== Senior ===
He was invited to the Iran senior national team camp by Carlos Queiroz on 16 May 2015. Ezatolahi was included in the final list for the friendly match against Uzbekistan and the 2018 FIFA World Cup qualifier against Turkmenistan. He debuted as a starter against Uzbekistan on 11 June 2015 in a 1–0 win. He scored his first senior national team goal during his fourth cap on 12 November 2015 in a 3–1 World Cup qualifying win over Turkmenistan. He became the youngest goal scorer for the Iranian national team at the age of 19 years and 42 days. In May 2018, he was named in Iran's preliminary squad for the 2018 FIFA World Cup in Russia. He missed Iran's first group match against Morocco because of a red card in qualification but played other two matches against Spain and Portugal. He was ruled out of Iran's squad for 2019 AFC Asian Cup because of injury.

On 1 June 2026, he was named in the 26-man squad for the 2026 FIFA World Cup.

== Personal life ==
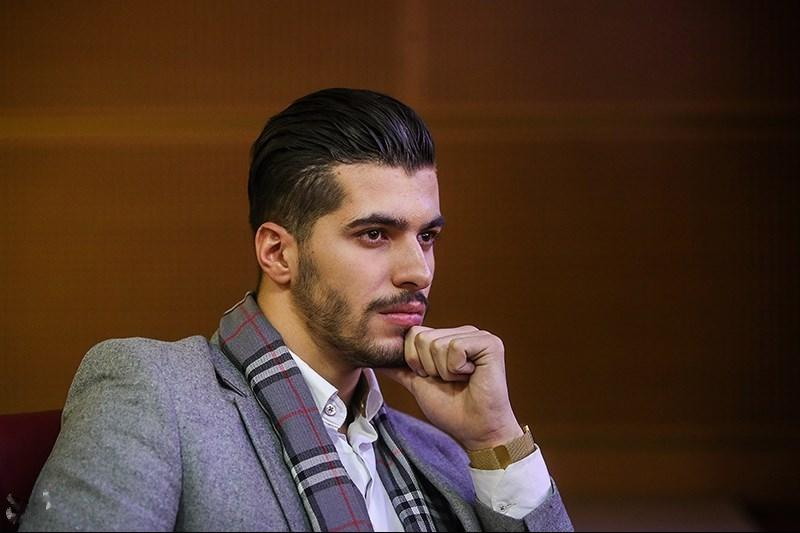
Ezatollahi at Ferari film press conference during 2017 Fajr Film Festival

Ezatollahi is the son of Nader Ezatolahi, an Iranian football coach in Malavan Academy who is also his agent.

In 2019, Ezatollah published a rap song supporting the Iranian team at 2019 AFC Asian Cup since he got injured playing for Reading before the cup and could not be with the team.

== Career statistics ==
=== Club ===
As of match played 16 May 2026

Appearances and goals by club, season and competition
| Club | Season | League | | | Cup | | League Cup | | Continental | | Other | | Total | |
| Club | Season | Division | Apps | Goals | Apps | Goals | Apps | Goals | Apps | Goals | Apps | Goals | Apps | Goals |
|---|---|---|---|---|---|---|---|---|---|---|---|---|---|---|
| Malavan | 2012–13 | Persian Gulf Pro League | 10 | 0 | 1 | 0 | — | | — | | — | | 11 | 0 |
| Malavan | 2013–14 | Persian Gulf Pro League | 9 | 0 | 1 | 0 | — | | — | | — | | 10 | 0 |
| Malavan | Total | | 19 | 0 | 2 | 0 | — | | — | | — | | 21 | 0 |
| Atlético Madrid C | 2014–15 | Tercera División | 5 | 0 | 0 | 0 | — | | — | | 1 | 0 | 6 | 0 |
| Rostov | 2015–16 | Russian Premier League | 1 | 0 | 0 | 0 | — | | — | | — | | 1 | 0 |
| Rostov | 2016–17 | Russian Premier League | 10 | 1 | 1 | 0 | — | | 6 | 1 | — | | 17 | 2 |
| Rostov | 2017–18 | Russian Premier League | 0 | 0 | 0 | 0 | — | | — | | — | | 0 | 0 |
| Rostov | Total | | 11 | 1 | 1 | 0 | — | | 6 | 1 | — | | 18 | 2 |
| Anzhi (loan) | 2016–17 | Russian Premier League | 10 | 0 | 1 | 0 | — | | — | | — | | 11 | 0 |
| Amkar Perm (loan) | 2017–18 | Russian Premier League | 15 | 1 | 1 | 0 | — | | — | | 0 | 0 | 16 | 1 |
| Reading (loan) | 2018–19 | EFL Championship | 4 | 0 | 0 | 0 | 0 | 0 | — | | — | | 4 | 0 |
| Eupen (loan) | 2019–20 | Belgian First Division A | 4 | 0 | 2 | 0 | — | | — | | — | | 6 | 0 |
| Vejle | 2020–21 | Danish Superliga | 29 | 4 | 3 | 0 | — | | — | | — | | 32 | 4 |
| Vejle | 2021–22 | Danish Superliga | 13 | 1 | 4 | 1 | — | | — | | — | | 17 | 2 |
| Vejle | 2022–23 | Danish First Division | 20 | 2 | 4 | 0 | — | | — | | — | | 24 | 2 |
| Vejle | 2023–24 | Danish Superliga | 11 | 1 | 0 | 0 | — | | — | | — | | 11 | 1 |
| Vejle | Total | | 73 | 8 | 11 | 1 | — | | — | | — | | 84 | 9 |
| Al-Gharafa (loan) | 2021–22 | Qatar Stars League | 4 | 0 | 3 | 0 | — | | 6 | 0 | — | | 13 | 0 |
| Shabab Al Ahli | 2023–24 | UAE Pro League | 12 | 2 | 2 | 0 | — | | — | | — | | 14 | 2 |
| Shabab Al Ahli | 2024–25 | UAE Pro League | 20 | 6 | 3 | 0 | 3 | 0 | 9 | 1 | 1 | 0 | 36 | 7 |
| Shabab Al Ahli | 2025–26 | UAE Pro League | 22 | 5 | 3 | 1 | 0 | 0 | 10 | 3 | 1 | 0 | 36 | 9 |
| Shabab Al Ahli | Total | | 54 | 13 | 8 | 1 | 3 | 0 | 19 | 4 | 2 | 0 | 86 | 18 |
| Career total | | | 199 | 23 | 29 | 2 | 3 | 0 | 31 | 5 | 3 | 0 | 265 | 30 |

=== International ===
As of match played 17 November 2026

Appearances and goals by national team and year
| National team | Year | Apps | Goals |
|---|---|---|---|
| Iran | 2015 | 4 | 1 |
| Iran | 2016 | 10 | 0 |
| Iran | 2017 | 9 | 0 |
| Iran | 2018 | 5 | 0 |
| Iran | 2019 | 2 | 0 |
| Iran | 2020 | 1 | 0 |
| Iran | 2021 | 10 | 0 |
| Iran | 2022 | 9 | 0 |
| Iran | 2023 | 8 | 0 |
| Iran | 2024 | 16 | 0 |
| Iran | 2025 | 7 | 0 |
| Iran | 2026 | 9 | 1 |
| Total | | 90 | 2 |

Scores and results list Iran's goal tally. First, the score column indicates the score after each Ezatolahi goal.

List of international goals scored by Saeid Ezatolahi
| No. | Date | Venue | Opponent | Score | Result | Competition |
|---|---|---|---|---|---|---|
| 1 | 12 November 2015 | Azadi Stadium, Tehran, Iran | Turkmenistan | 2–1 | 3–1 | 2018 FIFA World Cup qualification |
| 2 | 4 June 2026 | Mardan Sports Complex, Antalya, Turkiye | Mali | 1–0 | 2–0 | Friendly |

== Honours ==
Vejle

- Danish 1st Division: 2022–23

Shabab Al Ahli

- UAE Pro League: 2024–25
- UAE Super Cup: 2024
- Qatar–UAE Challenge Shield: 2025

Individual

- Iranian Young Player of the Year: 2012–13
- AFC Asian Cup Team of the Tournament: 2023
