= Pavel Mogilevets =

Russian footballer (born 1993)

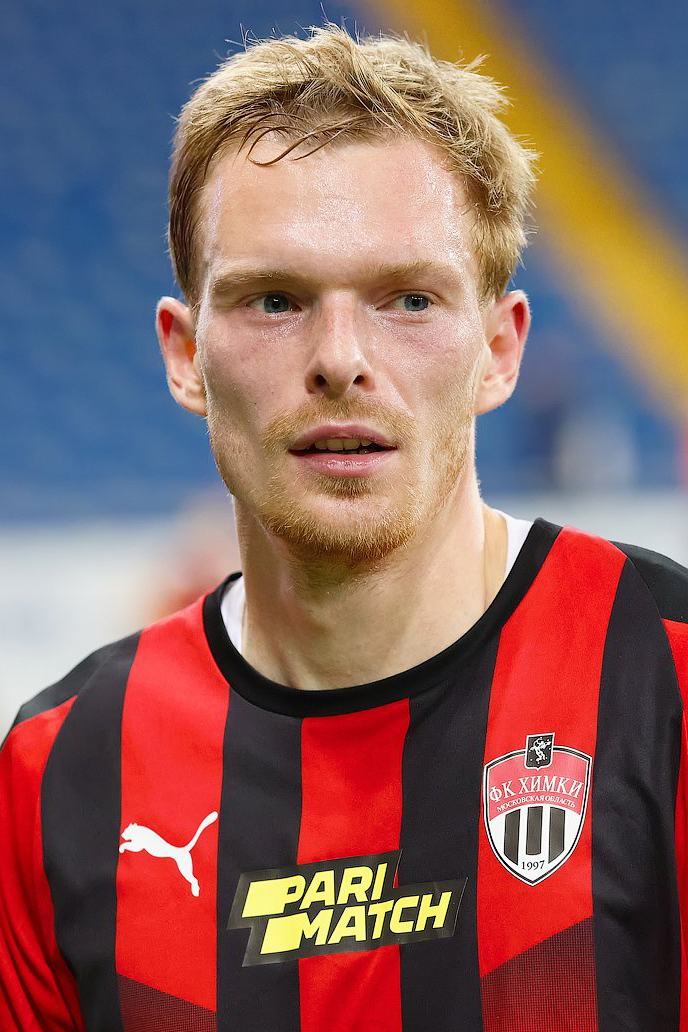
- Mogilevets with Khimki in 2020

Personal information
- Full name: Pavel Sergeyevich Mogilevets
- Date of birth: 25 January 1993 (age 33)
- Place of birth: Kingisepp, Russia
- Height: 1.83 m (6 ft 0 in)
- Position: Midfielder

Youth career
- DYuSSh Smena-Zenit

Senior career*
Years	Team	Apps	(Gls)
2012–2016	Zenit St.Petersburg	12	(0)
2013–2015	→ Zenit-2 St.Petersburg (loan)	16	(2)
2014	→ Rubin Kazan (loan)	16	(2)
2015–2016	→ Rostov (loan)	26	(1)
2017	Rostov	19	(0)
2018–2020	Rubin Kazan	56	(0)
2020–2021	Khimki	13	(1)
2021	Nizhny Novgorod	6	(0)
2022	Bunyodkor	7	(0)
2023	Urartu	8	(0)

International career^{‡}
2013–2014	Russia U21	10	(1)
2014–2018	Russia	4	(0)
- * Club domestic league appearances and goals as of 9 December 2023 ‡ National team caps and goals as of 7 September 2018

Pavel Sergeyevich Mogilevets (Russian: Павел Сергеевич Могилевец; born 25 January 1993) is a Russian former professional footballer who plays as central midfielder.

== Club career ==
He made his debut in the Russian Premier League on 19 May 2013 for FC Zenit St. Petersburg in a game against FC Volga Nizhny Novgorod.

On 16 October 2020, his contract with FC Rubin Kazan was terminated by mutual consent. On the same day, he signed with FC Khimki.

On 18 July 2021 he signed a two-year contract with Russian Premier League newcomer FC Nizhny Novgorod.

On 8 July 2023, Urartu announced the signing of Mogilevets. He left Urartu by mutual consent on 4 November 2023.

== International ==
He made his debut for the Russia national football team on 26 May 2014 in a friendly game against Slovakia. On 6 June 2014, he replaced injured Roman Shirokov in the Russian squad for the 2014 FIFA World Cup.

== Career statistics ==
=== Club ===
As of 12 December 2021

Club	Season	League			Cup		Continental		Total	
Club	Season	Division	Apps	Goals	Apps	Goals	Apps	Goals	Apps	Goals
Zenit St. Petersburg	2012–13	RPL	2	0	0	0	0	0	2	0
Zenit St. Petersburg	2013–14	RPL	0	0	0	0	2 (Note: Appearances in the UEFA Champions League)	0	2	0
Zenit St. Petersburg	2014–15	RPL	9	0	2	0	3 (Note: One appearance in the UEFA Champions League, two appearances in the UEFA Europa League)	0	14	0
Zenit St. Petersburg	2016–17	RPL	1	0	1	0	0	0	2	0
Zenit St. Petersburg	Total		12	0	3	0	5	0	20	0
Zenit-2 St. Petersburg	2013–14	PFL	13	2	–		–		13	2
Zenit-2 St. Petersburg	2014–15	PFL	3	0	–		–		3	0
Zenit-2 St. Petersburg	Total		16	2	0	0	0	0	16	2
Rubin Kazan (loan)	2013–14	RPL	11	2	–		0	0	11	2
Rubin Kazan (loan)	2014–15	RPL	5	0	–		–		5	0
Rostov (loan)	2015–16	RPL	26	1	0	0	–		26	1
Rostov	2016–17	RPL	7	0	–		0	0	7	0
Rostov	2017–18	RPL	12	0	2	0	–		14	0
Rostov	Total (2 spells)		45	1	2	0	0	0	47	1
Rubin Kazan	2017–18	RPL	8	0	–		–		8	0
Rubin Kazan	2018–19	RPL	27	0	4	0	–		31	0
Rubin Kazan	2019–20	RPL	20	0	1	0	–		21	0
Rubin Kazan	2020–21	RPL	1	0	0	0	–		1	0
Rubin Kazan	Total (2 spells)		72	2	5	0	0	0	77	2
Khimki	2020–21	RPL	13	1	2	0	–		15	1
Nizhny Novgorod	2021–22	RPL	6	0	2	0	–		8	0
Career total			164	6	14	0	5	0	183	6

== Honours ==
Zenit Saint Petersburg

- Russian Football Premier League: 2014–15
