= Khoren Bayramyan =

Armenian-Russian footballer (born 1992)

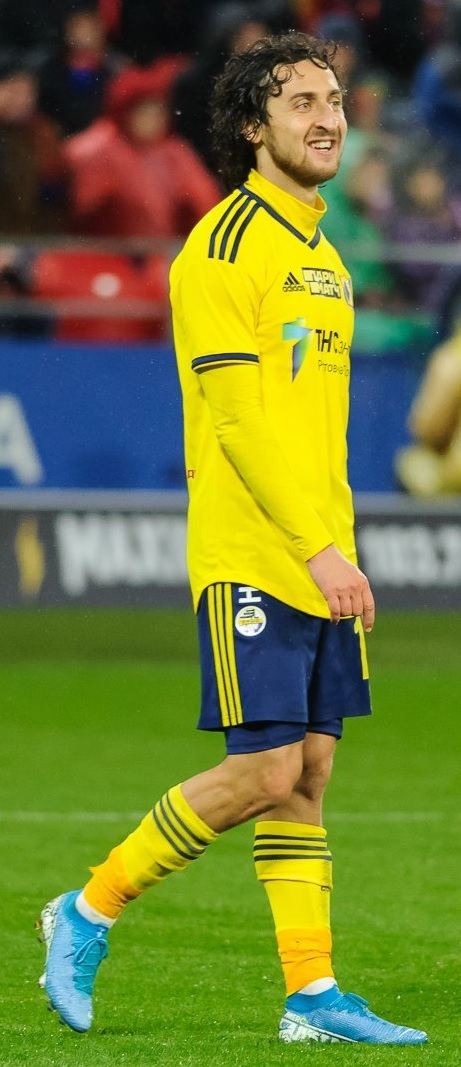
- Bayramyan with Rostov in 2019

Personal information
- Full name: Khoren Robertovich Bayramyan
- Date of birth: 7 January 1992 (age 34)
- Place of birth: Koti, Armenia
- Height: 1.70 m (5 ft 7 in)
- Position: Midfielder

Team information
- Current team: Ural Yekaterinburg
- Number: 19

Youth career
- 2009–2011: Rostov

Senior career*
Years	Team	Apps	(Gls)
2011–2026	Rostov	216	(10)
2013–2014	→ Rotor Volgograd (loan)	16	(3)
2014–2015	→ Volgar Astrakhan (loan)	32	(2)
2018–2019	→ Rubin Kazan (loan)	25	(2)
2026–	Ural Yekaterinburg	0	(0)

International career^{‡}
2010	Russia U-18	6	(1)
2011	Russia U-19	3	(1)
2012	Russia U-21	7	(1)
2020–	Armenia	22	(2)
- * Club domestic league appearances and goals as of 17 May 2026 ‡ National team caps and goals as of 25 March 2023

Khoren Robertovich Bayramyan (Armenian: Խորեն Ռոբերտի Բայրամյան; Russian: Хорен Робертович Байрамян; born 7 January 1992) is an Armenian professional footballer who plays for Russian club Ural Yekaterinburg and the Armenia national team. He mostly plays in the left midfielder position, but also can play as a right midfielder or winger on either side.

== Club career ==
Bayramyan made his Russian Premier League debut for FC Rostov on 18 June 2011 in a game against Rubin Kazan.

On 23 June 2018, Bayramyan joined Rubin Kazan on loan for the 2018–19 season. He had previously played on loan at Rotor Volgograd and Volgar Astrakhan.

On 15 June 2023, Bayramyan extended his contract with Rostov to June 2025.

On 19 June 2026, Bayramyan moved to Ural Yekaterinburg in the Russian First League.

== International career ==
Bayramyan represented Russia on junior levels. However, prior to the start of the 2020–21 Russian Premier League season, it was announced that footballer playing for other Eurasian Economic Union countries would no longer be considered foreign players in Russia. He could therefore represent Armenia without any restrictions. On 18 July 2020, the Football Federation of Armenia confirmed that Bayramyan had agreed to represent Armenia. He made his debut on 5 September 2020 in a UEFA Nations League 1–2 loss against North Macedonia.

== Personal life ==
Bayramyan's younger brother Levon is also a professional footballer.

== Career statistics ==
=== Club ===
As of match played 17 May 2026.

Appearances and goals by club, season and competition
Club	Season	League			National Cup		Europe		Other		Total	
Club	Season	Division	Apps	Goals	Apps	Goals	Apps	Goals	Apps	Goals	Apps	Goals
Rostov	2010	Russian Premier League	0	0	0	0	—		—		0	0
Rostov	2011–12	Russian Premier League	16	0	3	0	—		1 (Note: Appearance(s) in Russian Premier League relegation play-offs)	0	20	0
Rostov	2012–13	Russian Premier League	0	0	0	0	—		0	0	0	0
Rostov	2013–14	Russian Premier League	0	0	0	0	—		—		0	0
Rostov	2014–15	Russian Premier League	0	0	0	0	0	0	0	0	0	0
Rostov	2015–16	Russian Premier League	7	0	0	0	—		—		7	0
Rostov	2016–17	Russian Premier League	20	0	1	0	2 (Note: One appearance in UEFA Champions League, one appearance in UEFA Europa League)	0	—		23	0
Rostov	2017–18	Russian Premier League	16	1	1	0	—		—		17	1
Rostov	2018–19	Russian Premier League	0	0	0	0	—		—		0	0
Rostov	2019–20	Russian Premier League	26	4	2	0	—		—		28	4
Rostov	2020–21	Russian Premier League	23	3	1	0	1 (Note: Appearance(s) in UEFA Europa League)	0	—		25	3
Rostov	2021–22	Russian Premier League	25	1	0	0	—		—		25	1
Rostov	2022–23	Russian Premier League	23	1	8	1	—		—		31	2
Rostov	2023–24	Russian Premier League	27	0	7	0	—		—		34	0
Rostov	2024–25	Russian Premier League	25	0	11	0	—		—		36	0
Rostov	2025–26	Russian Premier League	8	0	7	1	—		—		15	1
Rostov	Total		216	10	41	2	3	0	1	0	261	12
Rotor Volgograd (loan)	2013–14	Russian First League	16	3	1	0	—		—		17	3
Volgar Astrakhan (loan)	2014–15	Russian First League	32	2	2	0	—		—		34	2
Rubin Kazan (loan)	2018–19	Russian Premier League	24	2	8	1	—		—		32	3
Career total			288	17	52	3	3	0	1	0	344	20

=== International ===
As of match played 25 March 2023

Appearances and goals by national team and year
National team	Year	Apps	Goals
Armenia
Armenia	2020	3	1
Armenia	2021	10	1
Armenia	2022	8	0
Armenia	2023	1	0
Total		22	2

==== International goals ====
Scores and results list Armenia's goal tally first.

No.	Date	Venue	Opponent	Score	Result	Competition
1.	11 October 2020	Tychy City Stadium, Tychy, Poland	Georgia	1–0	2–2	2020–21 UEFA Nations League C
2.	28 March 2021	Vazgen Sargsyan Republican Stadium, Yerevan, Armenia	Iceland	2–0	2–0	2022 FIFA World Cup qualification
