= Andrei Prepeliță =

Romanian footballer

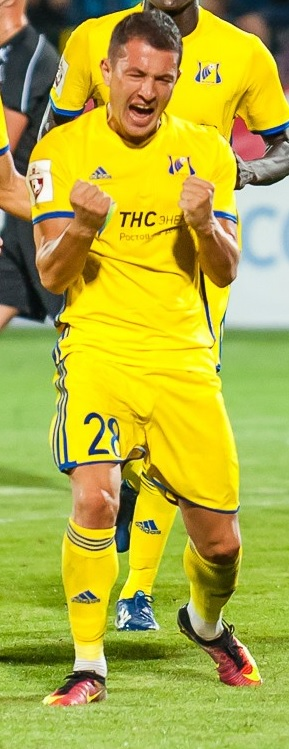
- Prepeliță celebrating a goal for Rostov in 2016

Personal information
- Date of birth: 8 December 1985 (age 40)
- Place of birth: Slatina, Romania
- Height: 1.78 m (5 ft 10 in)
- Position: Midfielder

Youth career
- 1991–2000: CȘS Slobozia
- 2000–2002: Argeș Pitești

Senior career*
Years	Team	Apps	(Gls)
2002–2007	Argeș Pitești	112	(11)
2007–2011	Universitatea Craiova	120	(7)
2011–2015	Steaua București	82	(9)
2015–2016	Ludogorets Razgrad	25	(1)
2016–2017	Rostov	17	(1)
2018–2019	Concordia Chiajna	32	(3)
2019–2021	Argeș Pitești	27	(2)
Total		415	(34)

International career
2003–2004	Romania U19	6	(0)
2003–2006	Romania U21	18	(2)
2014–2017	Romania	14	(0)

Managerial career
- 2020–2022: Argeș Pitești
- 2023–2024: Gloria Buzău
- 2025: Petrocub Hîncești
- 2025–2026: Unirea Slobozia
- * Club domestic league appearances and goals

Andrei Prepeliță (born 8 December 1985) is a Romanian professional football manager and former player, who played mainly as a defensive midfielder.

== Club career ==
=== Argeș Pitești and Universitatea Craiova ===
Prepeliță was born on 8 December 1985 in Slatina, Romania and began playing organized football under the guidance of his father Constantin at CSȘ Slobozia. He completed his junior years at Argeș Pitești, being brought there by Viorel Moiceanu. He made his debut for the first team on 7 May 2003 under coach Ion Moldovan in a Liga I match which ended with a 1–0 loss to Gloria Bistrița. On 1 May 2004, he scored his first league goal in a 4–1 home win over Național București. After five seasons, Prepeliță was transferred by Argeș together with teammate Ciprian Tănasă to Universitatea Craiova for €1.5 million. He played regularly for "U" Craiova during his four-season spell.

=== Steaua București ===
On 2 August 2011, Prepeliță signed a four-year contract with Steaua București. During his first three seasons, Prepeliță won two titles and the 2013 Supercupa României under coach Laurențiu Reghecampf. In his last season under the guidance of coach Constantin Gâlcă he helped the club win The Treble, consisting of the championship title, the Cupa României and the Cupa Ligii.

Prepeliță also had some European performances with The Military Men as they reached the Europa League group phase three times, passing it twice. The first was in the 2011–12 season when the club was eliminated in the round of 32 by Twente. The second time was in the 2012–13 edition when they reached the round of 16, being defeated by Chelsea after getting past Ajax Amsterdam in the previous phase. The team also reached the 2013–14 Champions League group stage, where Prepeliță played in a draw against Schalke 04 and a loss to Chelsea.

=== Ludogorets Razgrad ===
On 1 July 2015, Prepeliță signed a two-year contract with Ludogorets Razgrad in Bulgaria, where he played alongside fellow Romanians Cosmin Moți and Claudiu Keșerü. On 11 May 2016, they each scored once in a 4–1 win over Pirin Blagoevgrad. Ludogorets won the Bulgarian league title at the end of the season.

=== Rostov ===
Prepeliță joined Russian Premier League club Rostov on 31 August 2016. He made his Russian Premier League debut on 9 September, as coach Ivan Daniliants used him as a starter in a 2–1 home win over Krylia Sovetov in which he scored the victory goal with a header. The team played in the Champions League group stage, finishing in third place. Subsequently, they qualified to the Europa League, where they were eliminated in the round of 16 by Manchester United. He left Rostov in August 2017.

=== Concordia Chiajna and Argeș Pitești ===
Prepeliță returned to Romania in February 2018, signing a contract with Concordia Chiajna, where he reunited with the coach who gave him his senior debut, Ion Moldovan. On 6 September 2019, Prepeliță rejoined Argeș Pitești, which was playing in Liga II, helping them gain promotion to the first league. There, he played in the first part of the 2020–21 season, after which he retired. Prepeliță accumulated a total of 327 Liga I matches with 29 goals and 40 appearances with one goal in European competitions.

== International career ==
Prepeliță played 14 games for Romania, making his debut on 7 September 2014 when coach Victor Pițurcă sent him in the 84th minute to replace Ovidiu Hoban in a 1–0 away victory against Greece in the Euro 2016 qualifiers. Prepeliță played a total of five games during those successful qualifiers. He was selected by coach Anghel Iordănescu to be part of Romania's squad for the final tournament. There, he made his last appearance for the national team in a 1–1 draw against Switzerland as his side failed to progress from their group.

== Managerial career ==
In December 2020, Prepeliță was presented as the manager of Argeș Pitești. In the 2021–22 season, he managed to reach the play-off, a first-ever performance for the club, finishing in sixth place. On 26 October 2022, his contract was terminated.

In June 2023, Prepeliță was named the head coach of Liga II side Gloria Buzău. He helped them gain promotion at the end of his first season. However, the following season started badly for Gloria, who were in last place after the first eight rounds, thus Prepeliță was dismissed. He then worked between April and May 2025 for Moldovan team Petrocub Hîncești with whom he finished the season in fourth place. Prepeliță returned to coach in the Romanian first league in June 2025 when he signed with Unirea Slobozia. In February 2026, following a 1–0 loss to Petrolul Ploiești, he was sacked and replaced by Claudiu Niculescu.

== Personal life ==
His father, Constantin, was also a footballer who appeared in 200 Divizia A games and scored 32 goals for Olt Scornicești. Prepeliță was coached by his father while he was a junior player at CSȘ Slobozia.

== Playing statistics ==
=== Club ===
Appearances and goals by club, season and competition
Club	Season	League			National cup (Note: Includes Cupa României, Bulgarian Cup, Russian Cup)		League cup (Note: Includes Cupa Ligii)		Europe		Other		Total	
Club	Season	Division	Apps	Goals	Apps	Goals	Apps	Goals	Apps	Goals	Apps	Goals	Apps	Goals
Argeș Pitești	2002–03	Divizia A	4	0	0	0	—		—		—		4	0
Argeș Pitești	2003–04	Divizia A	25	3	2	0	—		—		—		27	3
Argeș Pitești	2004–05	Divizia A	26	2	3	0	—		—		—		29	2
Argeș Pitești	2005–06	Divizia A	28	2	1	0	—		—		—		29	2
Argeș Pitești	2006–07	Liga I	29	4	2	0	—		—		—		31	4
Argeș Pitești	Total		112	11	8	0	0	0	0	0	0	0	120	11
Universitatea Craiova	2007–08	Liga I	30	1	0	0	—		—		—		30	1
Universitatea Craiova	2008–09	Liga I	33	2	2	0	—		—		—		35	2
Universitatea Craiova	2009–10	Liga I	29	3	1	0	—		—		—		30	3
Universitatea Craiova	2010–11	Liga I	28	1	2	1	—		—		—		30	2
Universitatea Craiova	Total		120	7	5	1	0	0	0	0	0	0	125	8
Steaua București	2011–12	Liga I	11	0	1	1	—		7 (Note: Appearances in UEFA Europa League)	0	—		19	1
Steaua București	2012–13	Liga I	18	1	2	0	—		8	0	—		28	1
Steaua București	2013–14	Liga I	26	3	5	0	—		4 (Note: Appearances in UEFA Champions League)	0	1 (Note: Appearances in Supercupa României)	0	36	3
Steaua București	2014–15	Liga I	27	5	3	0	3	0	11 (Note: Six appearances and one goal in UEFA Champions League, five appearances in UEFA Europa League)	1	1	0	45	6
Steaua București	Total		82	9	11	1	3	0	30	1	2	0	128	11
Ludogorets Razgrad	2015–16	A Group	25	1	1	0	—		2	0	1 (Note: Appearances in Bulgarian Supercup)	0	29	1
Ludogorets Razgrad	2016–17	A Group	0	0	—		—		1	0	—		1	0
Ludogorets Razgrad	Total		25	1	1	0	0	0	3	0	1	0	30	11
Rostov	2016–17	Russian Premier League	17	1	1	0	—		7 (Note: Four appearances in UEFA Champions League, three appearances in UEFA Europa League)	0	—		25	1
Rostov	2017–18	Russian Premier League	0	0	—		—		—		—		0	0
Rostov	Total		17	1	1	0	0	0	7	0	0	0	25	1
Concordia Chiajna	2017–18	Liga I	13	2	—		—		—		—		13	2
Concordia Chiajna	2018–19	Liga I	19	1	1	0	—		—		—		20	1
Concordia Chiajna	Total		32	3	1	0	0	0	0	0	0	0	33	3
Argeș Pitești	2019–20	Liga II	17	2	0	0	—		—		—		17	2
Argeș Pitești	2020–21	Liga I	10	0	1	0	—		—		—		11	0
Argeș Pitești	Total		27	2	1	0	0	0	0	0	0	0	28	2
Career total			415	34	28	2	3	0	40	1	3	0	489	37

=== International ===
National team	Year	Apps	Goals
Romania
Romania	2014	2	0
Romania	2015	5	0
Romania	2016	7	0
Total		14	0

== Managerial statistics ==
As of 31 January 2026

Team	From	To	Record							
Team	From	To	G	W	D	L	GF	GA	GD	Win %
Argeș Pitești	8 December 2020	26 October 2022	88	32	21	35	78	101	−23	36.36
Gloria Buzău	20 June 2023	4 September 2024	43	18	13	12	58	49	+9	41.86
Petrocub Hîncești	25 April 2025	23 May 2025	4	2	0	2	9	6	+3	50.00
Unirea Slobozia	4 June 2025	4 February 2026	26	6	4	16	25	40	−15	23.08
Total			161	58	38	65	170	196	−26	36.02

== Honours ==
=== Player ===
Steaua București

- Liga I: 2012–13, 2013–14, 2014–15
- Cupa României: 2014–15
- Supercupa României: 2013
- Cupa Ligii: 2014–15

Ludogorets Razgrad

- Bulgarian A Group: 2015–16
- Bulgarian Supercup runner-up: 2015

=== Coach ===
Individual

- Gazeta Sporturilor Romania Coach of the Month: November 2021
