= Ivan Daniliants =

Moldovan football coach (born 1953)

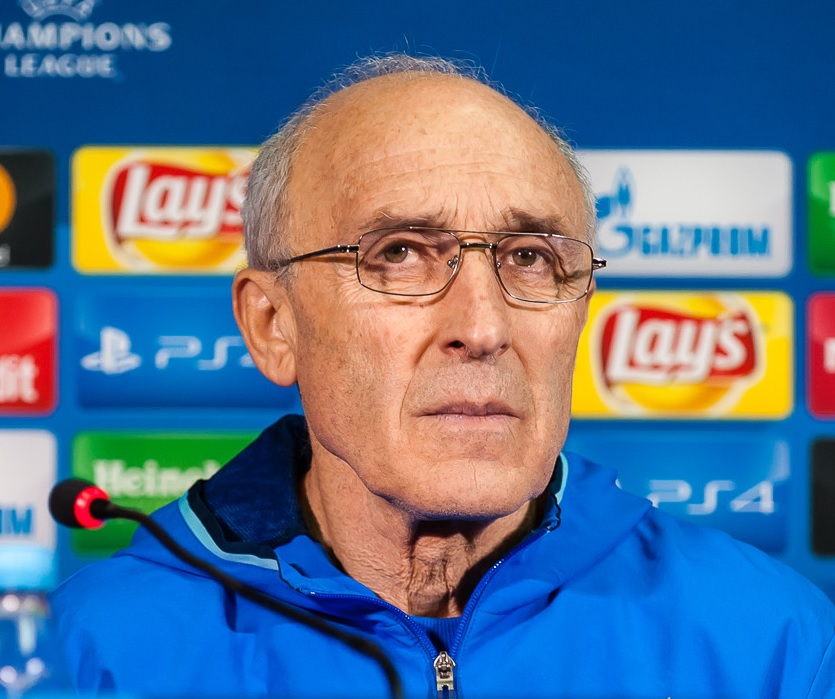
- Daniliants with Rostov in 2016

Personal information
- Full name: Ivan Albertovich Daniliants
- Date of birth: 20 February 1953 (age 73)
- Place of birth: Ashkhabad, Turkmen SSR, USSR (now Ashgabat, Turkmenistan)
- Height: 1.85 m (6 ft 1 in)

Senior career*
Years	Team	Apps	(Gls)
1971–1976	Stroitel	104+	
1977–1981	Zimbru Chișinău	133	(2)

Managerial career
- 1984–1986: Zaria Bălți
- 1986: Zimbru Chișinău (assistant)
- 1987–1990: Tiligul-Tiras Tiraspol
- 1991: Austria Klagenfurt
- 1991–1994: Austria Klagenfurt (junior)
- 1998–1999: Moldova
- 1999: Kärnten (sport director)
- 2000: Sheriff Tiraspol
- 2001–2006: Klagenfurt (sport director)
- 2009–2013: Rubin Kazan (functionary)
- 2015–2016: Rostov (assistant)
- 2016–2017: Rostov
- 2017–2019: Rubin Kazan (assistant)
- 2020–2021: Moldova (sport director)
- 2022: Kairat (assistant)
- 2022–: Tractor (assistant)
- * Club domestic league appearances and goals

Ivan Daniliants or Danilianț (Russian: Иван Альбертович Данильянц; born 20 February 1953) is a Moldovan and Austrian professional association football coach and a former Soviet defender.

== Playing career ==
In 1971, Daniliants began his career at FC Stroitel Ashgabat, which later changed its name to FC Kolhozçy. In 1977, Daniliants moved to FC Zimbru Chișinău, where he played more than 100 matches. He retired as a football player in 1981.

== Coaching career ==
In 1981–1983, Daniliants graduated from the Russian State University of Physical Education, Sport, Youth and Tourism in Moscow. He became a UEFA A-licensed coach in 1993 and received a state diploma for training children and youths in 2001.

He coached a junior football club in Klagenfurt from 1991 to 1994 and was a coach of the Austrian Carinthia (U-16 and U-18) from 1994 to 1997.

Daniliants was head coach of the Moldova national football team from June 1998 to September 1999.

He returned to Austria in 1999 and became the SK Austria Kärnten's sports director.

Daniliants was appointed coach of Sheriff Tiraspol in 2000, but soon returned to Austria where he served as SAK Klagenfurt's sporting director again from 2001 to 2006.

In 2004, he obtained the UEFA Pro License.

From 2006 to 2009, Daniliants was the director of the training and licensing program for UEFA coaches in the Moldovan Football Federation.

Since 2010, he has been the head of the youth development program of FC Rubin Kazan. Daniliants left the club after the dismissal of head coach Kurban Berdyev in 2013.

In January 2015, Daniliants joined Kurban Berdyev's coaching staff at FC Rostov. On 9 September 2016, Daniliants was appointed as the club's Head Coach.

In January 2022 it was announced that he was appointed to the management club of the FC Kairat Almaty.

== Personal life ==
He was born in Ashgabat, Turkmenistan, of Armenian descent and has lived in the city of Klagenfurt, Austria and is an Austrian citizen. In 1974, he graduated from the Turkmen State University, Faculty of Physical Education.
