= Nikita Kovalyov =

Russian footballer (born 1996)

Personal information
- Full name: Nikita Aleksandrovich Kovalev
- Date of birth: 11 March 1996 (age 30)
- Place of birth: Rostov-on-Don, Russia
- Height: 1.82 m (6 ft 0 in)
- Position: Defender

Youth career
- 2014–2017: FC Rostov

Senior career*
Years	Team	Apps	(Gls)
2015–2016	FC Rostov	1	(0)
2017	FC Druzhba Maykop	8	(0)
2018	FC Dynamo Bryansk	6	(0)
- * Club domestic league appearances and goals

Nikita Aleksandrovich Kovalev (Russian: Никита Александрович Ковалёв; born 31 March 1996) is a Russian former football player.

Kovalyov made his debut in the Russian Premier League for FC Rostov on 20 August 2016 in a game against FC Tom Tomsk.
