= Valeri Yaroshenko =

Russian footballer

Personal information
- Full name: Valeri Aleksandrovich Yaroshenko
- Date of birth: 8 May 1997 (age 29)
- Place of birth: Saint Petersburg, Russia
- Height: 1.79 m (5 ft 10 1/2 in)
- Position: Midfielder

Youth career
- FC Zenit St. Petersburg

Senior career*
Years	Team	Apps	(Gls)
2013–2016	FC Zenit-2 St. Petersburg	13	(1)
2016–2017	FC Rostov	1	(0)
2017	→ FC Baltika Kaliningrad (loan)	4	(0)
2019	FC Ararat Moscow	1	(0)

International career
2012	Russia U-16	1	(0)
2014	Russia U-17	5	(0)
- * Club domestic league appearances and goals

Valeri Aleksandrovich Yaroshenko (Russian: Валерий Александрович Ярошенко; born 8 May 1997) is a Russian former football player.

== Club career ==
He made his professional debut in the Russian Professional Football League for FC Zenit-2 St. Petersburg on 19 April 2014 in a game against FC Znamya Truda Orekhovo-Zuyevo.

He made his Russian Premier League debut for FC Rostov on 29 October 2016 in a game against FC Amkar Perm.
