= Olimp-2 =

Football stadium in Rostov-on-Don, Russia

- «Олимп-2»
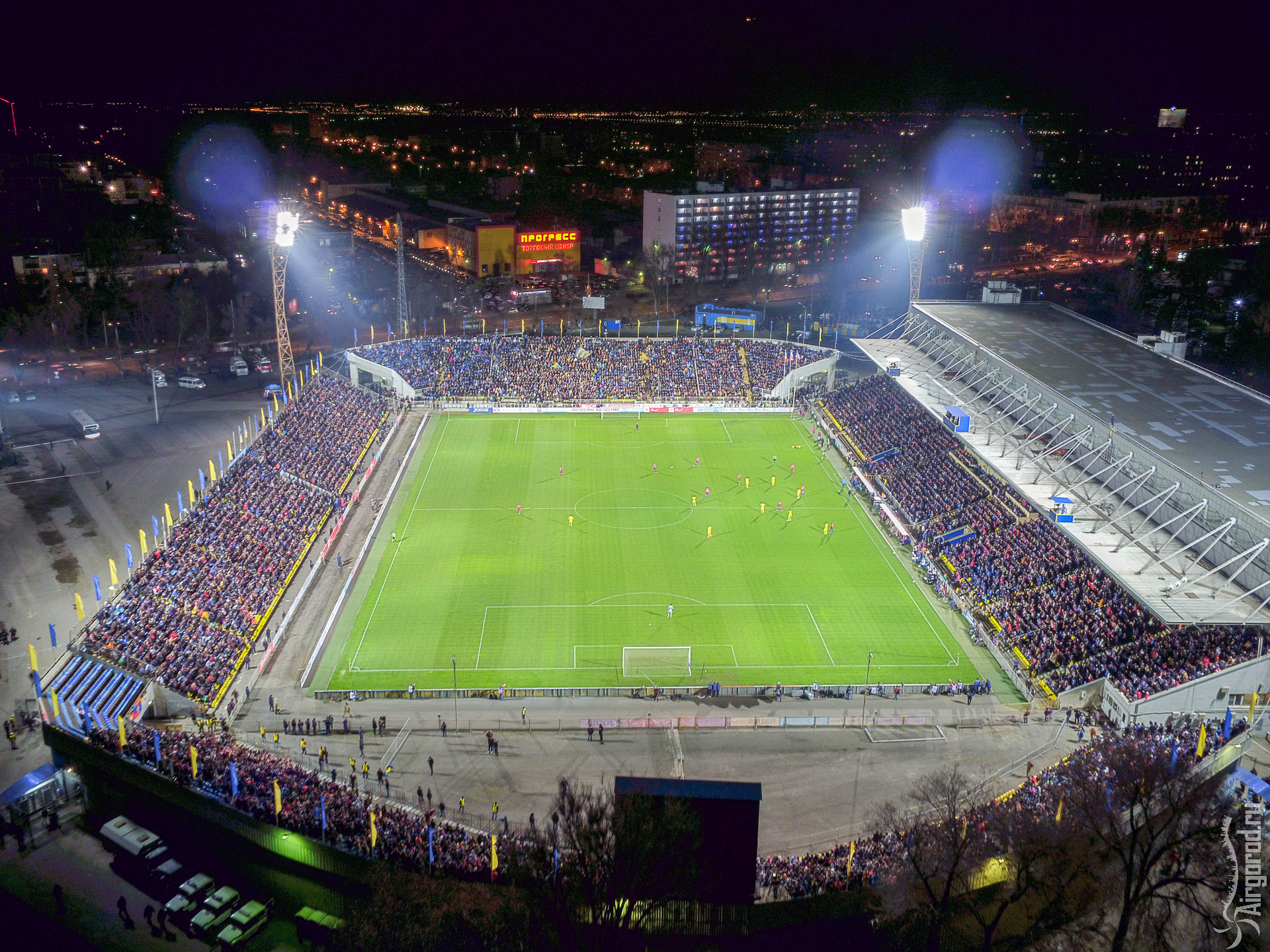
- Olimp-2 stadium
- Interactive map of Olimp-2
- Former names: Rostselmash Plant Stadium; Rostselmash
- Location: Rostov-on-Don, Russia
- Coordinates: 47°14′34.84″N 39°45′39.79″E
- Capacity: 15,840
- Type: Stadium
- Event: sporting events
- Surface: Grass

Construction
- Opened: 1930

Tenants
- FC Rostov (1930–2018); SKA Rostov-on-Don (1958–1970)

Olimp-2 (Russian: «Олимп-2», Olympus-2) is a football stadium in Rostov-on-Don, Russia. From 1930 to 2018 it was the home ground of FC Rostov, and in 1958–1970 it was also the home ground of SKA Rostov-on-Don. The stadium opened in 1930 and was known as Rostselmash Plant Stadium until 1996 when it was known as Rostselmash. Between 2002 and 2005 it was known as Olimp – 21 vek (Olympus – 21st century). Since 2021 it is known as the Viktor Ponedelnik's "Olimp" (Олимп имени Виктора Понедельника).

The capacity of the stadium peaked at 32,000 in the 1950s, when the second tier of stand was built. Its current capacity, after the latest reconstruction was completed in 2009, stands at 15,840.

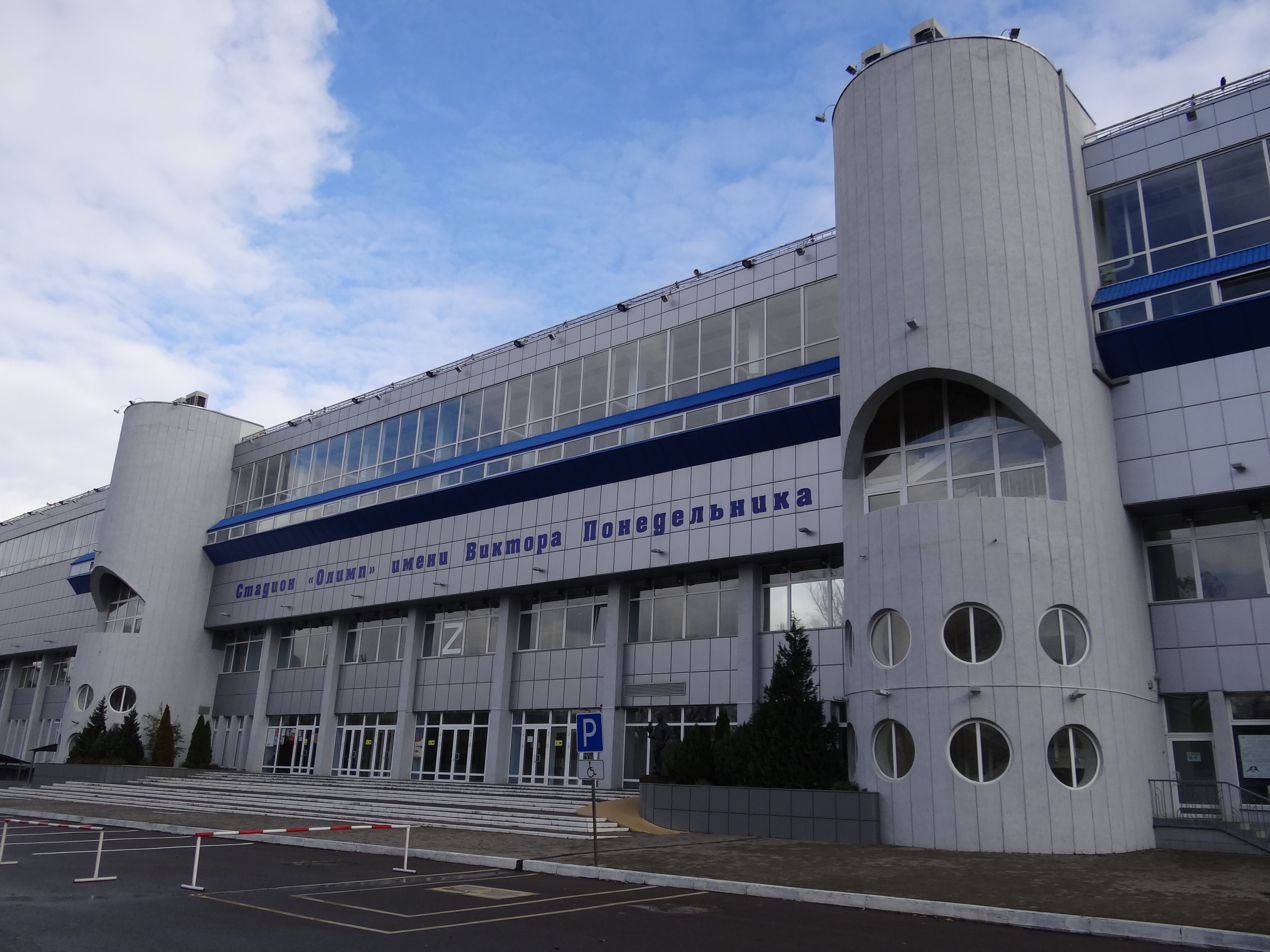
West stand of Olimp-2 stadium.
