= Roman Khodunov =

Russian footballer

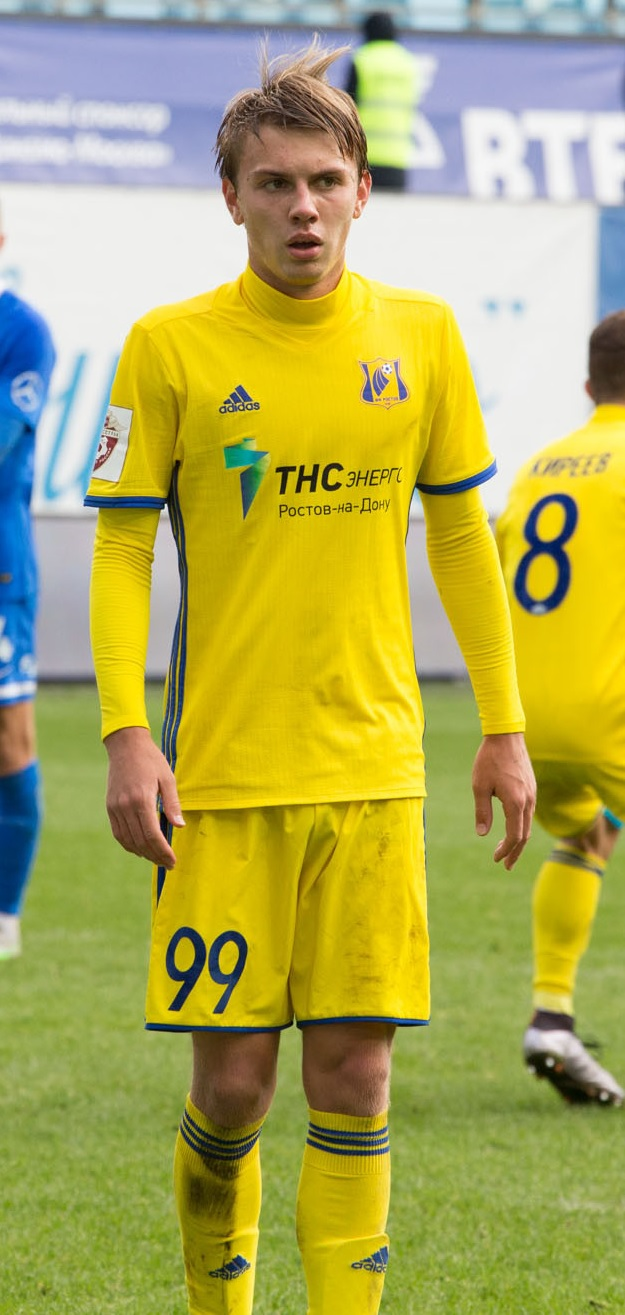
- Khodunov with Rostov in 2016

Personal information
- Full name: Roman Aleksandrovich Khodunov
- Date of birth: 28 March 1997 (age 29)
- Height: 1.83 m (6 ft 0 in)
- Positions: Defender; forward; midfielder

Youth career
- 2016–2017: FC Rostov

Senior career*
Years	Team	Apps	(Gls)
2012–2015	Donenergo Aksay		
2015	SKA Rostov-on-Don	14	(1)
2016–2017	FC Rostov	0	(0)
2017–2018	Akademiya Futbola Rostov-on-Don	31	(5)
2018–2019	FC Krasnodar-3	11	(4)
2019–2020	FC Biolog-Novokubansk	23	(1)
2021	FC Aluston-YBK		
- * Club domestic league appearances and goals

Roman Aleksandrovich Khodunov (Russian: Роман Александрович Ходунов; born 28 March 1997) is a Russian former football player.

== Club career ==
He made his debut in the Russian Professional Football League for FC SKA Rostov-on-Don on 19 July 2015 in a game against FC Astrakhan.

He made his debut for the FC Rostov main squad on 21 September 2016 in a Russian Cup game against FC Dynamo Moscow.
