= Filipp Kondryukov =

Russian footballer

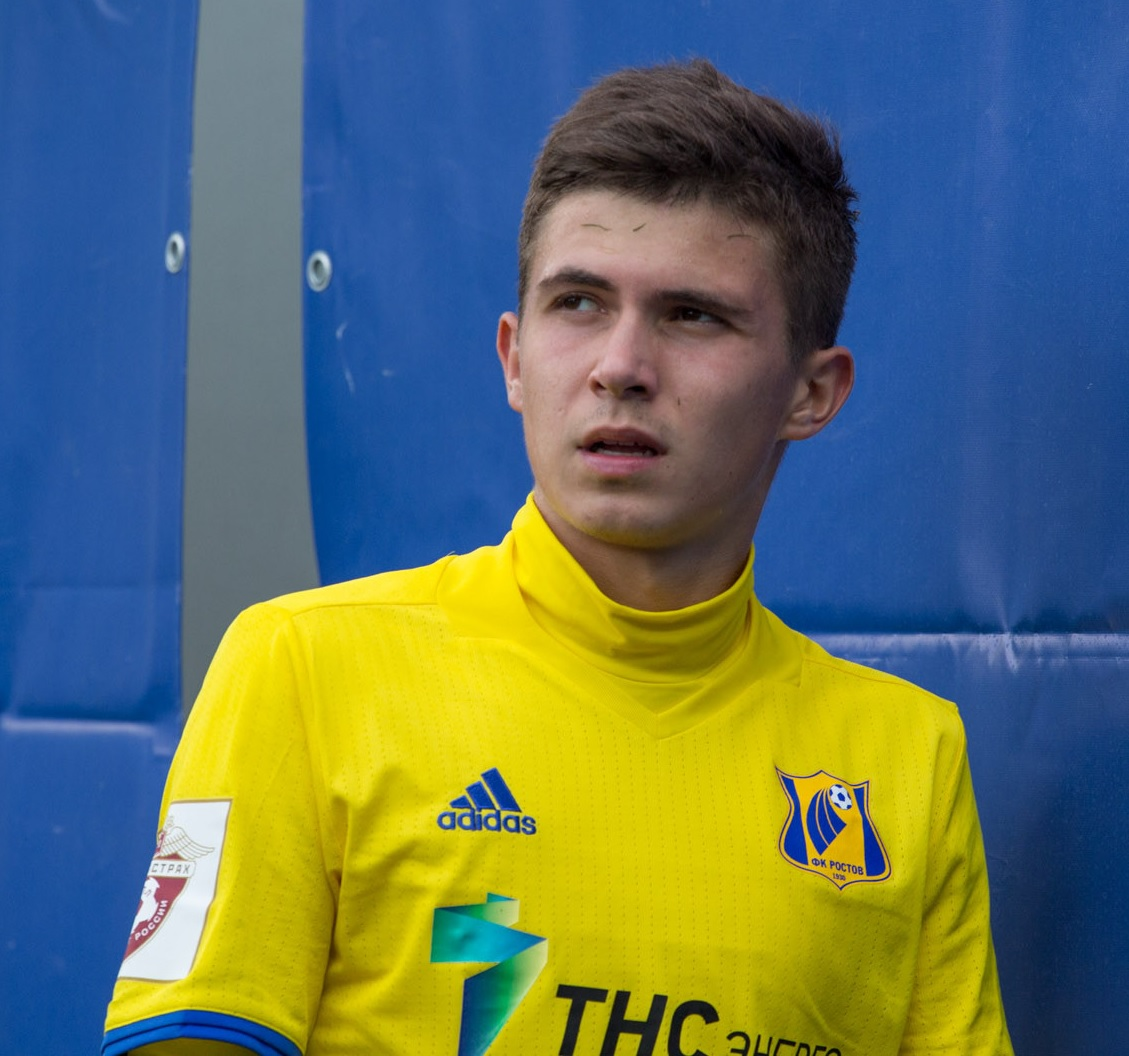
- Kondryukov with Rostov in 2016

Personal information
- Full name: Filipp Olegovich Kondryukov
- Date of birth: 24 February 1997 (age 29)
- Place of birth: Rostov-on-Don, Russia
- Height: 1.75 m (5 ft 9 in)
- Positions: Midfielder; forward

Youth career
- –2017: FC Rostov

Senior career*
Years	Team	Apps	(Gls)
2015–2016	FC Rostov	0	(0)
2017–2018	FC Dynamo Stavropol	12	(1)
2019–2021	FC SKA Rostov-on-Don	31	(10)
- * Club domestic league appearances and goals

Filipp Olegovich Kondryukov (Russian: Филипп Олегович Кондрюков; born 24 February 1997) is a Russian former football player.

== Club career ==
He played his first game for the main squad of FC Rostov on 24 September 2015 in a Russian Cup game against FC Tosno.
