= Andrei Sorokin =

Russian footballer

Personal information
- Full name: Andrei Alekseyevich Sorokin
- Date of birth: 28 March 1996 (age 30)
- Place of birth: Moscow, Russia
- Height: 1.81 m (5 ft 11 in)
- Position: Defender

Youth career
- Lokomotiv Moscow
- 2013–2015: CSKA Moscow

Senior career*
| Years | Team | Apps | (Gls) |
| 2013–2015 | CSKA Moscow | 0 | (0) |
| 2015–2016 | Sakhalin Yuzhno-Sakhalinsk | 21 | (0) |
| 2017 | Rostov | 0 | (0) |
| 2017–2018 | Sakhalin Yuzhno-Sakhalinsk | 19 | (0) |
| 2018–2020 | Gorodeya | 44 | (4) |
| 2021 | Dynamo Stavropol | 29 | (0) |
| 2022–2024 | Sakhalin Yuzhno-Sakhalinsk | 75 | (11) |

International career
| 2011 | Russia U15 | 1 | (0) |
| 2011–2012 | Russia U16 | 8 | (2) |
- * Club domestic league appearances and goals as of 3 November 2024

Andrei Alekseyevich Sorokin (Russian: Андрей Алексеевич Сорокин; born 28 March 1996) is a Russian football player.

== Club career ==
He made his debut in the Russian Professional Football League for FC Sakhalin Yuzhno-Sakhalinsk on 22 July 2015 in a game against FC Smena Komsomolsk-na-Amure.
