= 2015–16 FC Rostov season =

FC Rostov
2015–16 season
- Chairman: Viktor Goncharov
- Manager: Kurban Berdyev
- Stadium: Olimp – 2
- Russian Premier League: 2nd
- Russian Cup: Round of 32 vs Tosno
- Top goalscorer: League: Sardar Azmoun (9); All: Sardar Azmoun (9)
Home colours	Away colours

The 2015–16 FC Rostov season was the club's seventh successive season in the Russian Premier League, the highest tier of football in Russia. Rostov will also take part in the Russian Cup, entering at the Round of 32 stage.

== Squad ==
As of 26 February 2016

Note: Flags indicate national team as defined under FIFA eligibility rules; some limited exceptions apply. Players may hold more than one non-FIFA nationality.

No.	Pos.	Nation	Player
1	GK	KAZ	Stas Pokatilov
2	MF	BLR	Tsimafei Kalachou
4	DF	RUS	Denis Terentyev
5	DF	CRC	Felicio Brown Forbes
6	MF	IRI	Saeid Ezatolahi
7	FW	RUS	Dmitry Poloz
8	MF	MLI	Moussa Doumbia
9	MF	GAB	Guélor Kanga
11	FW	RUS	Aleksandr Bukharov
15	DF	ANG	Bastos
16	MF	ECU	Christian Noboa
17	MF	RUS	Igor Kireyev
18	MF	RUS	Pavel Mogilevets (on loan from Zenit)
19	MF	RUS	Khoren Bayramyan
20	FW	IRI	Sardar Azmoun (on loan from Rubin Kazan)

No.	Pos.	Nation	Player
21	MF	RUS	Said-Ali Akhmaev
23	MF	RUS	Aleksandr Troshechkin
25	DF	RUS	Ivan Novoseltsev
28	DF	FIN	Boris Rotenberg (loan from Dynamo Moscow)
30	DF	RUS	Fyodor Kudryashov
32	FW	GEO	Nika Kacharava
34	DF	RUS	Timofei Margasov
35	GK	RUS	Soslan Dzhanayev
44	DF	ESP	César Navas
77	GK	RUS	Nikita Medvedev
84	MF	MDA	Alexandru Gațcan
86	FW	KOR	Yoo Byung-Soo
89	MF	RUS	Aleksandr Yerokhin
97	GK	RUS	Yevgeni Goshev

=== Out on loan ===
Note: Flags indicate national team as defined under FIFA eligibility rules; some limited exceptions apply. Players may hold more than one non-FIFA nationality.

No.	Pos.	Nation	Player
11	MF	RUS	Artyom Kulishev (at Dynamo St. Petersburg)
14	DF	RUS	Temur Mustafin (at Avangard Kursk)

No.	Pos.	Nation	Player
57	DF	RUS	Ruslan Abazov (at Tyumen)

=== Reserve squad ===
Note: Flags indicate national team as defined under FIFA eligibility rules; some limited exceptions apply. Players may hold more than one non-FIFA nationality.

No.	Pos.	Nation	Player
12	GK	RUS	Nikita Chagrov
31	MF	RUS	Ruslan Shapovalov
37	MF	RUS	Sergei Zabrodin
40	DF	RUS	Dmitri Khristis
41	MF	RUS	Nikolai Stankevich
45	DF	RUS	Anton Lazutkin
46	FW	RUS	Danila Lyuft
48	MF	RUS	Artyom Maksimenko
51	GK	RUS	Ivan Zozin
45	DF	RUS	Artyom Sobol
58	MF	RUS	Maksim Kondrashyov
59	DF	RUS	Ivan Reutenko
60	MF	RUS	Aleksei Neskoromny
62	GK	RUS	Vladislav Suslov
63	DF	RUS	Aleksandr Logunov
66	DF	RUS	Daniil Ostapenko
68	MF	RUS	Vasiliy Lipin

No.	Pos.	Nation	Player
69	MF	RUS	Nikita Kovalyov
70	MF	RUS	Andrei Sidenko
71	MF	RUS	Dmitri Veber
73	DF	RUS	Aleksei Grechkin
74	MF	RUS	Yevgeni Stukanov
78	FW	RUS	Dmitri Solovyov
80	MF	RUS	Dzhambulat Dulayev
81	MF	RUS	Roman Khodunov
83	MF	RUS	Ilya Zakharov
87	MF	RUS	Maksim Sukhomlinov
88	MF	RUS	Denis Mashkin
90	MF	RUS	Filipp Kondryukov
91	FW	RUS	Danila Khakhalev
94	GK	RUS	Roman Pshukov
96	DF	RUS	Nikita Bocharov
98	DF	RUS	Sergei Kiryakov
99	FW	SRB	Nemanja Nikolić

== Transfers ==
=== Summer ===
In: Note: Flags indicate national team as defined under FIFA eligibility rules; some limited exceptions apply. Players may hold more than one non-FIFA nationality.

No.	Pos.	Nation	Player
4	DF	RUS	Denis Terentyev (from (Russia) Zenit Saint Petersburg, previously on loan at (Russia) Tom Tomsk)
5	DF	CRC	Felicio Brown Forbes (from (Russia) Ufa)
16	MF	ECU	Christian Noboa (from (Greece) P.A.O.K.)
17	MF	RUS	Igor Kireyev (end of loan to (Russia) Amkar Perm)
18	MF	RUS	Pavel Mogilevets (on loan from (Russia) Zenit Saint Petersburg)
19	MF	RUS	Khoren Bayramyan (end of loan to (Russia) Volgar Astrakhan)
20	FW	IRI	Sardar Azmoun (loan extended from (Russia) Rubin Kazan)
21	MF	RUS	Said-Ali Akhmayev (from (Russia) Spartak Moscow, previously on loan)
28	DF	FIN	Boris Rotenberg (on loan from (Russia) Dynamo Moscow)
34	DF	RUS	Timofei Margasov (end of loan to (Russia) Sibir Novosibirsk)
37	MF	RUS	Sergei Zabrodin (from (Russia) Rostov-M-2 Rostov-on-Don)
44	DF	ESP	César Navas (from (Russia) Rubin Kazan)
46	FW	RUS	Danila Lyuft
48	MF	RUS	Artyom Maksimenko (from (Russia) Dynamo Moscow academy)
51	GK	RUS	Ivan Zozin
58	MF	RUS	Maksim Kondrashyov (from (Russia) Rostov-M-2 Rostov-on-Don)
59	DF	RUS	Ivan Reutenko (from (Russia) Rostov-M-2 Rostov-on-Don)
68	MF	RUS	Vasili Lipin (from (Russia) Rostov-M-2 Rostov-on-Don)
74	MF	RUS	Yevgeni Stukanov
78	FW	RUS	Dmitri Solovyov (from (Russia) Rostov-M-2 Rostov-on-Don)
87	MF	RUS	Maksim Sukhomlinov (from (Russia) Rostov-M-2 Rostov-on-Don)
94	GK	RUS	Roman Pshukov (from (Russia) Rostov-M-2 Rostov-on-Don)
96	DF	RUS	Nikita Bocharov
98	DF	RUS	Sergei Kiryakov
—	MF	RUS	Ivan Baklanov (end of loan to (Russia) Arsenal-2 Tula)

Out: Note: Flags indicate national team as defined under FIFA eligibility rules; some limited exceptions apply. Players may hold more than one non-FIFA nationality.

No.	Pos.	Nation	Player
1	GK	CRO	Stipe Pletikosa (released)
3	DF	RUS	Vladimir Granat (end of loan from (Russia) Dynamo Moscow)
4	MF	RUS	Dmitri Torbinski (to (Russia) FC Krasnodar)
5	DF	RUS	Vitali Dyakov (to (Russia) Dynamo Moscow)
7	MF	RUS	Maksim Grigoryev (end of loan from (Russia) Lokomotiv Moscow)
15	DF	BLR	Maksim Bardachow (end of loan from (Russia) Tom Tomsk)
16	MF	MDA	Mihai Plătică (to (Russia) Shinnik Yaroslavl)
17	FW	TKM	Wahyt Orazsähedow (to (Turkmenistan) MGSK Aşgabat)
19	DF	CRO	Hrvoje Milić (to (Croatia) Hajduk Split)
22	FW	RUS	Artyom Dzyuba (end of loan from (Russia) Spartak Moscow)
39	DF	RUS	Andrei Demchenko (to (Russia) Solyaris Moscow)
54	DF	RUS	Konstantin Kulabukhov (to (Russia) Dynamo Barnaul)
55	DF	RSA	Siyanda Xulu (to (South Africa) Kaizer Chiefs)
59	DF	RUS	Mikhail Martynov (to (Russia) Volga Tver)
61	FW	RUS	Gennadi Kozlov (to (Russia) Zenit-Izhevsk)
70	FW	RUS	Aleksandr Stepanov (to (Russia) Torpedo Moscow)
88	MF	LTU	Edgaras Česnauskis (released)
96	MF	RUS	Aleksandr Yuryev (to (Russia) Vityaz Podolsk)
—	DF	RUS	Ruslan Abazov (on loan to (Russia) Fakel Voronezh, then on loan to (Russia) Tyumen, previously on loan at (Russia) Tyumen)
—	DF	RUS	Temur Mustafin (to (Russia) Avangard Kursk, previously on loan)
—	DF	RUS	Andrei Vasilyev (to (Russia) Zenit-2 St. Petersburg, previously on loan to (Russia) Arsenal Tula)
—	MF	RUS	Sergey Belousov (to (Russia) Metallurg Lipetsk, previously on loan to (Russia) Sokol Saratov)
—	MF	RUS	Nika Chkhapeliya (to (Russia) Baltika Kaliningrad, previously on loan at (Russia) Zenit Penza)
—	MF	RUS	Azim Fatullayev (to (Russia) Yenisey Krasnoyarsk, previously on loan at (Russia) FC Tosno)
—	MF	RUS	Artyom Kulishev (to (Russia) Dynamo Saint Petersburg, previously on loan to (Russia) Vityaz Podolsk)

=== Winter ===
In: Note: Flags indicate national team as defined under FIFA eligibility rules; some limited exceptions apply. Players may hold more than one non-FIFA nationality.

No.	Pos.	Nation	Player
1	GK	KAZ	Stas Pokatilov (from (Kazakhstan) Aktobe)
6	MF	IRI	Saeid Ezatolahi (from (Spain) Atlético Madrid)
30	DF	RUS	Fyodor Kudryashov (from (Russia) Terek Grozny)
32	FW	GEO	Nika Kacharava (from (Georgia (country)) Tskhinvali)
49	MF	RUS	Dmitri Tananeyev (from own academy)
56	MF	RUS	Artyom Sobol (from (Russia) SKA Rostov-on-Don)
60	MF	RUS	Aleksei Neskoromny
63	DF	RUS	Aleksandr Logunov (from (Russia) Lokomotiv Moscow)
71	MF	RUS	Dmitri Veber (from (Russia) SKA Rostov-on-Don)
77	GK	RUS	Nikita Medvedev (from (Russia) Zenit-Izhevsk Izhevsk)
80	MF	RUS	Dzhambulat Dulayev (free agent)
81	MF	RUS	Roman Khodunov (from (Russia) SKA Rostov-on-Don)
83	MF	RUS	Ilya Zakharov (from (Russia) SKA Rostov-on-Don)
89	MF	RUS	Aleksandr Yerokhin (from (Russia) Ural Sverdlovsk Oblast)

Out: Note: Flags indicate national team as defined under FIFA eligibility rules; some limited exceptions apply. Players may hold more than one non-FIFA nationality.

No.	Pos.	Nation	Player
—	MF	RUS	Nika Chkhapeliya (to (Russia) Tosno, previously on loan to (Russia) Baltika Kaliningrad)

== Friendlies ==
5 July 2015	Rostov (Russia)	4 – 0	(Bosnia and Herzegovina) Mladost Velika Obarska	Stara Pazova, Serbia
MSK (UTC+4)	Gațcan 12'; Poloz 27', 51'; Bukharov 66'; Novoseltsev (yellow card)	Summary

9 July 2015	Rostov (Russia)	2 – 1	(Serbia) Rad	Stara Pazova, Serbia
MSK (UTC+4)	Doumbia 4'; Kalachou 34'	Summary	Veselinović 26'

12 July 2015	Rostov (Russia)	4 – 0	(Serbia) Radnički Niš	Stara Pazova, Serbia
MSK (UTC+4)	Doumbia 10'; Kanga 37'; Poloz 52'; Kalachou 60'	Summary

== Competitions ==
=== Russian Premier League ===
==== Results by round ====
Round	1	2	3	4	5	6	7	8	9	10	11	12	13	14	15	16	17	18	19	20	21	22	23	24	25	26	27	28	29	30
Ground	H	A	H	A	H	A	H	A	H	H	A	H	A	H	A	H	A	H	A	H	A	H	A	A	H	A	H	A	H	A
Result	D	W	D	W	D	L	W	L	W	W	L	W	W	W	W	D	L	W	W	W	D	W	D	W	W	L	W	W	W	W
Position	9	4	5	5	5	5	5	6	5	4	5	4	4	2	2	2	2	2	2	1	2	1	2	1	1	2	2	2	2	2

Updated to match(es) played on 21 May 2016. Source: Russian Premier League
A = Away; H = Home; W = Win; D = Draw; L = Loss

==== Matches ====
18 July 2015 1	Rostov	1 – 1	Terek Grozny	Rostov-on-Don
21:00 MSK (UTC+3)	Kalachou (yellow card) 33'; Doumbia 38'	Summary	Lebedenko (yellow card) 31' (goal) 70'; Rodolfo (yellow card) 33'; Píriz (yellow card) 40'; Kuzyayev (yellow card) 63'; Rybus (yellow card) 74'; Maurício (yellow card) 86'	Stadium: Olimp-2; Attendance: 10,534; Referee: Sergey Karasev

25 July 2015 2	Ufa	1 – 2	Rostov	Ufa
16:00 MSK (UTC+3)	Handžić (yellow card) 51'; Zinchenko 78'	Summary	Yoo 46'; Doumbia (yellow card) 63'; Bastos 87'	Stadium: Neftyanik Stadium; Attendance: 3,375; Referee: Sergey Kulikov

2 August 2015 3	Rostov	0 – 0	Krasnodar	Rostov-on-Don
20:00 MSK (UTC+3)	Kalachou (yellow card) 23'; Navas (yellow card) 74'	Summary	Ahmedov (yellow card) 25'; Kaleshin (yellow card) 70'	Stadium: Olimp-2; Attendance: 12,997; Referee: Vladislav Bezborodov

10 August 2015 4	Rubin Kazan	0 – 3	Rostov	Kazan
18:00 MSK (UTC+3)	Kambolov (yellow card) 59'; Ozdoyev (yellow card) 82'; Georgiev (yellow card) 90+4'	Summary	Bukharov 4', 73' (yellow card) 35'; Kanga 39'	Stadium: Kazan Arena; Attendance: Alexey Nikolaev

16 August 2015 5	Rostov	1 – 1	Krylia Sovetov	Rostov-on-Don
20:00 MSK (UTC+3)	Poloz 13' (pen.)	Summary	Taranov (yellow card) 12'; Gabulov 53'	Stadium: Olimp-2; Attendance: 13,057; Referee: Mikhail Vilkov

22 August 2015 6	CSKA Moscow	2 – 1	Rostov	Khimki
18:00 MSK (UTC+3)	Musa 66'; Dzagoev 88'	Summary	Azmoun 10'; Mogilevets (yellow card) 38'; Bukharov (yellow card) 52'; Kanga (yellow card) 90+4'; Kalachou (yellow card) 90+4'	Stadium: Arena Khimki; Attendance: 7,000; Referee: Kirill Levnikov

28 August 2015 7	Rostov	1 – 0	Amkar Perm	Rostov-on-Don
20:00 MSK (UTC+3)	Margasov (yellow card) 46'; Kalachou (yellow card) 59'; Novoseltsev (yellow card) 60'; Azmoun (yellow card) 60'; Noboa 65'	Summary	Peev (yellow card) 52'; Ogude (red card) 58'; Belorukov (yellow card) 60'; Zanev (yellow card) 65'; Salugin (yellow card) 84'; Cherenchikov (yellow card) 87'; Komolov (yellow card) 90+3'	Stadium: Olimp-2; Attendance: 12,987; Referee: Aleksei Matyunin

13 September 2015 8	Spartak Moscow	1 – 0	Rostov	Moscow
13:30 MSK (UTC+3)	Promes 27'; Kombarov (yellow card) 87'; Popov (yellow card) 89'	Summary	Yoo (yellow card) 59'; Bastos (yellow card) 70'	Stadium: Otkrytiye Arena; Attendance: 22,228; Referee: Vladislav Bezborodov

18 September 2015 9	Rostov	1 – 0	Anzhi Makhachkala	Rostov-on-Don
19:00 MSK (UTC+3)	Margasov (yellow card) 1'; Mogilevets 7'; Navas (yellow card) 75'; Bayramyan (yellow card) 75'; Kalachou (yellow card) 83'; Rotenberg (yellow card) 90'	Summary		Stadium: Olimp-2; Attendance: 13,257; Referee: Vitaly Meshkov

28 September 2015 10	Rostov	2 – 1	Kuban Krasnodar	Rostov-on-Don
19:00 MSK (UTC+3)	Poloz 22' (pen.), 51'; Terentyev (yellow card) 54'; Noboa (yellow card) 71'; Azmoun (yellow card) 80'; Navas (yellow card) 81'	Summary	Rabiu (yellow card) 20'; Tkachyov 34'; Manolev (yellow card) 77'; Armaș (yellow card) 80'; Bugayev (yellow card) 81'	Stadium: Olimp-2; Attendance: 14,057; Referee: Sergey Kulikov

3 October 2015 11	Zenit St.Petersburg	3 – 0	Rostov	Saint Petersburg
17:00 MSK (UTC+3)	Smolnikov 26'; Dzyuba 34'; Danny 89'	Summary	Azmoun (yellow card) 80'	Stadium: Petrovsky Stadium; Attendance: 16,703; Referee: Aleksandr Egorov

19 October 2015 12	Rostov	3 – 2	Mordovia Saransk	Rostov-on-Don
19:00 MSK (UTC+3)	Nakhushev 17' (o.g.); Navas (yellow card) 22'; Azmoun 83'; Bukharov 85'; Kalachou (yellow card) 90'	Summary	Phibel (yellow card) 16'; Stevanović (yellow card) 18'; Rykov 23'; Nakhushev (yellow card) 55'; Mukhametshin 58'	Stadium: Olimp-2; Attendance: 10,035; Referee: Alexey Nikolaev

26 October 2015 13	Lokomotiv Moscow	0 – 2	Rostov	Moscow
19:30 MSK (UTC+3)	Samedov (yellow card) 90+3'	Summary	Bukharov (yellow card) 31'; Rotenberg (yellow card) 55'; Poloz 57'; Mogilevets (yellow card) 76'; Doumbia 85'	Stadium: Lokomotiv Stadium; Attendance: 6,380; Referee: Mikhail Vilkov

2 November 2015 14	Rostov	1 – 0	Dynamo Moscow	Rostov-on-Don
19:30 MSK (UTC+3)	Kalachou (yellow card) 34' (yellow-red card) 61'; Bastos 55'; Bayramyan (yellow card) 82'; Dzhanayev (yellow card) 86'	Summary	Dyakov (yellow card) 6'; Ionov (yellow card) 90+1'	Stadium: Olimp-2; Attendance: 13,313; Referee: Igor Nizovtsev

7 November 2015 15	Ural	1 – 2	Rostov	Yekaterinburg
14:00 MSK (UTC+3)	Manucharyan 6'; Fidler (yellow card) 61'	Summary	Poloz 14'; Rotenberg (yellow card) 48'; Bukharov (yellow card) 75'; Khozin 84' (o.g.); Kanga (yellow card) 86'	Stadium: SKB-Bank Arena; Attendance: 6,558; Referee: Aleksei Matyunin

23 November 2015 16	Rostov	1 – 1	Ufa	Rostov-on-Don
19:00 MSK (UTC+3)	Poloz 29' (pen.); Rotenberg (yellow card) 40'; Novoseltsev (yellow card) 80'; Navas (yellow card) 87'	Summary	Marcinho 55'; Zinchenko (yellow card) 88'	Stadium: Olimp-2; Attendance: 11,857; Referee: Aleksandr Egorov

30 November 2015 17	Krasnodar	2 – 1	Rostov	Krasnodar
19:00 MSK (UTC+3)	Kaboré (yellow card) 66'; Mamayev 86' (pen.); Wánderson 90+3'	Summary	Terentyev (yellow card) 79' (yellow-red card) 83'; Gațcan (yellow card) 84'; Azmoun 88'	Stadium: Kuban Stadium; Attendance: 4,875; Referee: Sergey Karasev

4 December 2015 18	Rostov	1 – 0	Rubin Kazan	Rostov-on-Don
19:00 MSK (UTC+3)	Rotenberg (yellow card) 34'; Ryzhikov 37' (o.g.); Kalachou (yellow card) 42'; Dzhanayev (yellow card) 42'; Noboa (yellow card) 85'	Summary	Kambolov (yellow card) 30'; Kislyak (yellow card) 36'; Georgiev (red card) 42'	Stadium: Olimp-2; Attendance: 10,457; Referee: Aexey Nikolaev

5 March 2016 19	Krylia Sovetov	0 – 1	Rostov	Samara
14:30 MSK (UTC+3)	Burlak (yellow card) 86'	Summary	Gațcan 29' (yellow card) 44'; Kudryashov (yellow card) 90+2'	Stadium: Metallurg Stadium; Attendance: 3,305; Referee: Vitaly Meshkov

12 March 2016 20	Rostov	2 – 0	CSKA Moscow	Rostov-on-Don
19:30 MSK (UTC+3)	Navas (yellow card) 20'; Azmoun (yellow card) 27'; Poloz 45'; Kanga (yellow card) 64'; Gațcan (yellow card) 86'; Noboa (yellow card) 87'; Doumbia 90+4'	Summary	Shchennikov (yellow card) 34'; Tošić (yellow card) 38'; Wernbloom (yellow card) 40'; Dzagoev (yellow card) 45'; Musa (yellow card) 90+1'	Stadium: Olimp-2; Attendance: 15,800; Referee: Vladislav Bezborodov

18 March 2016 21	Amkar Perm	0 – 0	Rostov	Perm
17:00 MSK (UTC+3)	Peev (yellow card) 54'; Komolov (yellow card) 90+1'	Summary	Poloz (yellow card) 54'; Kanga (yellow card) 76'	Stadium: Zvezda Stadium; Attendance: 9,370; Referee: Igor Fedotov

2 April 2016 22	Rostov	2 – 0	Spartak Moscow	Rostov-on-Don
19:30 MSK (UTC+3)	Bastos 2'; Noboa 20'; Mogilevets (yellow card) 53'; Bukharov (yellow card) 79'	Summary	Kombarov (yellow card) 33' (yellow-red card) 80'; Zotov (yellow card) 59'	Stadium: Olimp-2; Attendance: 15,8000; Referee: Sergey Lapochkin

8 April 2016 23	Anzhi Makhachkala	0 – 0	Rostov	Kaspiysk
19:00 MSK (UTC+3)	Boli (yellow card) 90+1'	Summary	Kudryashov (yellow card) 67'	Stadium: Anzhi Arena; Attendance: 6,200; Referee: Alexey Nikolaev

17 April 2016 24	Kuban Krasnodar	0 – 1	Rostov	Krasnodar
19:30 MSK (UTC+3)	Rabiu (yellow card) 19'; Kontsedalov (yellow card) 65'	Summary	Poloz (yellow card) 45'; Gațcan 81'; Mogilevets (yellow card) 90+1'; Kudryashov (yellow card) 90+1'	Stadium: Kuban Stadium; Attendance: 12,755; Referee: Aleksei Matyunin

24 April 2016 25	Rostov	3 – 0	Zenit St.Petersburg	Rostov-on-Don
19:30 MSK (UTC+3)	Kanga (yellow card) 41' (goal) 44'; Azmoun 59'; Yerokhin 76'	Summary	Witsel (yellow card) 70'; Kokorin (yellow card) 88'	Stadium: Olimp-2; Attendance: 15,800; Referee: Sergey Karasev

1 May 2016 26	Mordovia Saransk	2 – 1	Rostov	Saransk
14:30 MSK (UTC+3)	Stevanović (yellow card) 38' (goal) 86' (pen.); Samodin 56'; Revishvili (yellow card) 74'; Dudiyev (yellow card) 78'	Summary	Azmoun 67'; Kalachou (yellow card) 71'; Navas (yellow card) 84'	Stadium: Start Stadium; Attendance: 4,113; Referee: Vladimir Moskalyov

6 May 2016 27	Rostov	2 – 1	Lokomotiv Moscow	Rostov-on-Don
19:30 MSK (UTC+3)	Azmoun 8'; Bastos (yellow card) 21'; Noboa 45+1'; Gațcan (yellow card) 54'; Doumbia (yellow card) 90'	Summary	Logashov (yellow card) 24'; Škuletić 52'	Stadium: Olimp-2; Attendance: 14,500; Referee: Kirill Levnikov

12 May 2016 28	Dynamo Moscow	1 – 3	Rostov	Khimki
19:30 MSK (UTC+3)	Bećiraj 17'	Summary	Rotenberg (yellow card) 37'; Azmoun 40', 50'; Kudryashov 64'; Kalachou (yellow card) 69'	Stadium: Arena Khimki; Attendance: 5,192; Referee: Aleksandr Egorov

16 May 2016 29	Rostov	1 – 0	Ural	Rostov-on-Don
19:30 MSK (UTC+3)	Azmoun (yellow card) 24' (goal) 74'; Navas (yellow card) 39'; Yerokhin (yellow card) 61'	Report	Dantsev (yellow card) 20'; Fidler (yellow card) 31' (yellow-red card) 81'; Kulakov (yellow card) 80'; Lungu (yellow card) 81'	Stadium: Olimp-2; Attendance: 15,557; Referee: Sergey Karasev

21 May 2016 30	Terek Grozny	0 – 2	Rostov	Grozny
13:30 MSK (UTC+3)		Summary	Noboa 30'; Yerokhin 50'; Gațcan (yellow card) 88'; Novoseltsev (yellow card) 90'	Stadium: Akhmat-Arena; Attendance: 16,700; Referee: Aleksei Nikolaev

==== League table ====
Pos	Team	Pld	W	D	L	GF	GA	GD	Pts	Qualification or relegation
1	CSKA Moscow (C)	30	20	5	5	51	25	+26	65	Qualification for the Champions League group stage
2	Rostov	30	19	6	5	41	20	+21	63	Qualification for the Champions League third qualifying round
3	Zenit Saint Petersburg	30	17	8	5	61	32	+29	59	Qualification for the Europa League group stage (Note: Zenit Saint Petersburg qualified for the Europa League group stage by winning the 2015–16 Russian Cup.)
4	Krasnodar	30	16	8	6	54	25	+29	56	Qualification for the Europa League third qualifying round
5	Spartak Moscow	30	15	5	10	48	39	+9	50	Qualification for the Europa League third qualifying round

Source: Russian Premier League, Soccerway
Rules for classification: 1) Points; 2) Matches won; 3) Head-to-head points; 4) Head-to-head matches won; 5) Head-to-head goal difference; 6) Head-to-head goals scored; 7) Head-to-head away goals; 8) Goal difference; 9) Goals scored; 10) Away goals scored.
(C) Champions

=== Russian Cup ===
22 September 2015 Round of 32	Tosno	1 – 0 (a.e.t.)	Rostov	Saint Petersburg
19:00 MSK (UTC+3)	Chirkin (yellow card) 93'; Mikhalyov 99'	Summary	Khristis (yellow card) 38'; Lazutkin (yellow card) 63'; Nikolić (yellow card) 92'; Shapovalov (yellow card) 103'; Khakhalev (yellow card) 120'	Stadium: Malaya Sportivnaya Arena; Attendance: 750; Referee: Denis Shpilev

== Squad statistics ==
As of Match played 21 May 2016

=== Appearances and goals ===
No.	Pos	Nat	Player	Total		Premier League		Russian Cup	
No.	Pos	Nat	Player	Apps	Goals	Apps	Goals	Apps	Goals
2	MF	(Belarus) BLR	Tsimafei Kalachou	22	0	18+4	0	0	0
4	DF	(Russia) RUS	Denis Terentyev	14	0	6+8	0	0	0
6	MF	(Iran) IRI	Saeid Ezatolahi	1	0	0+1	0	0	0
7	FW	(Russia) RUS	Dmitry Poloz	30	7	27+3	7	0	0
8	MF	(Mali) MLI	Moussa Doumbia	12	3	3+9	3	0	0
9	MF	(Gabon) GAB	Guélor Kanga	17	2	14+3	2	0	0
11	FW	(Russia) RUS	Aleksandr Bukharov	25	3	13+12	3	0	0
15	DF	(Angola) ANG	Bastos	26	3	26	3	0	0
16	MF	(Ecuador) ECU	Christian Noboa	24	4	24	4	0	0
17	MF	(Russia) RUS	Igor Kireyev	1	0	0+1	0	0	0
18	MF	(Russia) RUS	Pavel Mogilevets	26	1	19+7	1	0	0
19	MF	(Russia) RUS	Khoren Bayramyan	7	0	2+5	0	0	0
20	FW	(Iran) IRI	Sardar Azmoun	24	9	15+9	9	0	0
23	MF	(Russia) RUS	Aleksandr Troshechkin	2	0	0+1	0	1	0
25	DF	(Russia) RUS	Ivan Novoseltsev	28	0	28	0	0	0
28	DF	(Finland) FIN	Boris Rotenberg	15	0	13+2	0	0	0
30	DF	(Russia) RUS	Fyodor Kudryashov	11	1	10+1	1	0	0
31	MF	(Russia) RUS	Ruslan Shapovalov	1	0	0	0	1	0
34	DF	(Russia) RUS	Timofei Margasov	25	0	23+2	0	0	0
35	GK	(Russia) RUS	Soslan Dzhanayev	30	0	30	0	0	0
37	MF	(Russia) RUS	Sergei Zabrodin	1	0	0	0	0+1	0
40	DF	(Russia) RUS	Dmitri Khristis	1	0	0	0	1	0
44	DF	(Spain) ESP	César Navas	28	0	28	0	0	0
45	DF	(Russia) RUS	Anton Lazutkin	1	0	0	0	1	0
66	MF	(Russia) RUS	Daniil Ostapenko	1	0	0	0	1	0
70	MF	(Russia) RUS	Andrei Sidenko	1	0	0	0	1	0
73	DF	(Russia) RUS	Aleksei Grechkin	1	0	0	0	1	0
74	MF	(Russia) RUS	Yevgeni Stukanov	1	0	0	0	1	0
84	MF	(Moldova) MDA	Alexandru Gațcan	23	2	23	2	0	0
86	FW	(South Korea) KOR	Yoo Byung-soo	7	1	3+4	1	0	0
88	MF	(Russia) RUS	Denis Mashkin	1	0	0	0	0+1	0
89	MF	(Russia) RUS	Aleksandr Yerokhin	11	2	5+6	2	0	0
90	MF	(Russia) RUS	Filipp Kondryukov	1	0	0	0	1	0
91	FW	(Russia) RUS	Danila Khakhalev	1	0	0	0	0+1	0
97	GK	(Russia) RUS	Yevgeni Goshev	1	0	0	0	1	0
99	FW	(Serbia) SRB	Nemanja Nikolić	1	0	0	0	1	0
Players away from the club on loan:
Players who appeared for Rostov no longer at the club:

=== Goal scorers ===
Place	Position	Nation	Number	Name	Russian Premier League	Russian Cup	Total
1	FW	(Iran)	20	Sardar Azmoun	9	0	9
2	FW	(Russia)	7	Dmitry Poloz	7	0	7
3	MF	(Ecuador)	16	Christian Noboa	4	0	4
4	FW	(Russia)	11	Aleksandr Bukharov	3	0	3
4	MF	(Mali)	8	Moussa Doumbia	3	0	3
4	DF	(Angola)	15	Bastos	3	0	3
4				Own goal	3	0	3
8	MF	(Moldova)	84	Alexandru Gațcan	2	0	2
8	MF	(Gabon)	9	Guélor Kanga	2	0	2
8	MF	(Russia)	89	Aleksandr Yerokhin	2	0	2
11	FW	(South Korea)	86	Yoo Byung-soo	1	0	1
11	MF	(Russia)	18	Pavel Mogilevets	1	0	1
11	DF	(Russia)	30	Fyodor Kudryashov	1	0	1
				TOTALS	41	0	41

=== Disciplinary record ===
Number	Nation	Position	Name	Russian Premier League		Russian Cup		Total	
Number	Nation	Position	Name	Yellow card	Red card	Yellow card	Red card	Yellow card	Red card
2	(Belarus)	MF	Tsimafei Kalachou	11	1	0	0	11	1
4	(Russia)	MF	Denis Terentyev	3	1	0	0	3	1
7	(Russia)	FW	Dmitry Poloz	2	0	0	0	2	0
8	(Mali)	MF	Moussa Doumbia	2	0	0	0	2	0
9	(Gabon)	MF	Guélor Kanga	5	0	0	0	5	0
11	(Russia)	FW	Aleksandr Bukharov	5	0	0	0	5	0
15	(Angola)	DF	Bastos	2	0	0	0	2	0
16	(Ecuador)	MF	Christian Noboa	3	0	0	0	3	0
18	(Russia)	MF	Pavel Mogilevets	4	0	0	0	4	0
19	(Russia)	MF	Khoren Bayramyan	2	0	0	0	2	0
20	(Iran)	FW	Sardar Azmoun	5	0	0	0	5	0
25	(Russia)	MF	Ivan Novoseltsev	3	0	0	0	3	0
28	(Finland)	DF	Boris Rotenberg	6	0	0	0	6	0
30	(Russia)	DF	Fyodor Kudryashov	3	0	0	0	3	0
31	(Russia)	MF	Ruslan Shapovalov	0	0	1	0	1	0
34	(Russia)	DF	Timofei Margasov	2	0	0	0	2	0
35	(Russia)	GK	Soslan Dzhanayev	2	0	0	0	2	0
40	(Russia)	DF	Dmitri Khristis	0	0	1	0	1	0
44	(Spain)	DF	César Navas	8	0	0	0	8	0
45	(Russia)	DF	Anton Lazutkin	0	0	1	0	1	0
84	(Moldova)	MF	Alexandru Gațcan	5	0	0	0	5	0
86	(South Korea)	FW	Yoo Byung-soo	1	0	0	0	1	0
89	(Russia)	MF	Aleksandr Yerokhin	1	0	0	0	1	0
90	(Russia)	FW	Danila Khakhalev	0	0	1	0	1	0
99	(Serbia)	FW	Nemanja Nikolić	0	0	1	0	1	0
			TOTALS	75	2	5	0	80	2
