= 2013–14 FC Rostov season =

Rostov
2013–14 season
- Chairman: Oleg Lopatin
- Manager: Miodrag Božović
- Stadium: Olimp – 2
- Russian Premier League: 7th
- Russian Cup: Winners
- Top goalscorer: League: Artem Dzyuba (17); All: Artem Dzyuba (19)
- Highest home attendance: 15,150 vs Spartak Moscow; 8 December 2013
- Lowest home attendance: 8,500 vs Ural; 30 September 2013; Rubin Kazan; 15 July 2013
- Average home league attendance: 11,682
| Home colours | Away colours |

The 2013–14 FC Rostov season was the fifth successive season that the club will play in the Russian Premier League, the highest tier of football in Russia, after narrowly avoiding relegation in 2012–13 after a relegation play-off victory over . They will also take part in the 2013–14 Russian Cup.

== Squad ==
As of 19 February 2014. According to the Official Russian Premier League website Archived 2014-05-06 at the Wayback Machine Note: Flags indicate national team as defined under FIFA eligibility rules; some limited exceptions apply. Players may hold more than one non-FIFA nationality.

| No. | Pos. | Nation | Player |
|---|---|---|---|
| 1 | GK | CRO | Stipe Pletikosa (captain) |
| 2 | MF | BLR | Timofei Kalachev |
| 5 | DF | RUS | Vitali Dyakov |
| 7 | MF | RUS | Georgy Gabulov |
| 8 | MF | UKR | Ihor Khudobyak (on loan from FC Karpaty Lviv) |
| 9 | MF | GAB | Guélor Kanga |
| 10 | FW | RUS | Artem Dzyuba (on loan from Spartak Moscow) |
| 11 | FW | KOR | Yoo Byung-Soo |
| 12 | GK | RUS | Artyom Orsayev |
| 13 | FW | RUS | Maksim Lepskiy |
| 14 | FW | RUS | Dmitry Poloz |
| 15 | DF | ANG | Bastos |
| 16 | GK | BLR | Anton Amelchenko |

| No. | Pos. | Nation | Player |
|---|---|---|---|
| 18 | MF | RUS | Azim Fatullayev |
| 19 | DF | CRO | Hrvoje Milic |
| 24 | FW | FRA | Florent Sinama Pongolle |
| 25 | DF | RUS | Arseniy Logashov (on loan from Lokomotiv Moscow) |
| 27 | DF | CIV | Igor Lolo |
| 33 | MF | RUS | Roman Yemelyanov (on loan from Shakhtar Donetsk) |
| 34 | DF | RUS | Timofei Margasov |
| 42 | MF | RUS | Artyom Kulishev |
| 49 | MF | GEO | Jano Ananidze (on loan from Spartak Moscow) |
| 55 | DF | RSA | Siyanda Xulu |
| 84 | MF | MDA | Alexandru Gațcan |
| 88 | FW | LTU | Edgaras Česnauskis |
| 99 | FW | SRB | Nemanja Nikolić |

=== Out on loan ===
Note: Flags indicate national team as defined under FIFA eligibility rules; some limited exceptions apply. Players may hold more than one non-FIFA nationality.

| No. | Pos. | Nation | Player |
|---|---|---|---|
| 3 | DF | SVK | Kornel Saláta (at Tom Tomsk) |
| 6 | MF | RUS | Nikita Vasilyev (at Torpedo Moscow) |
| 17 | MF | RUS | Aleksandr Vasilyev (at Sibir Novosibirsk) |
| 20 | MF | RUS | Sergey Belousov (at Shinnik Yaroslavl) |

| No. | Pos. | Nation | Player |
|---|---|---|---|
| 21 | MF | RUS | Khoren Bayramyan (at Rotor Volgograd) |
| 22 | MF | RUS | Igor Kireyev (at Spartak Nalchik) |
| 69 | FW | CZE | Jan Holenda (at Tom Tomsk) |
| 77 | DF | RUS | Kamil Agalarov (at Anzhi Makhachkala) |

The following players are listed on the official club's website as reserves and are registered with the Premier League. They are eligible to play for the main squad.

=== Reserve squad ===
Note: Flags indicate national team as defined under FIFA eligibility rules; some limited exceptions apply. Players may hold more than one non-FIFA nationality.

| No. | Pos. | Nation | Player |
|---|---|---|---|
| 29 | DF | RUS | Andrei Vasilyev |
| 30 | FW | RUS | Aleksandr Stepanov |
| 31 | GK | RUS | Vladislav Suslov |
| 32 | MF | RUS | Artyom Linchenko |
| 35 | FW | RUS | Daniil Ostapenko |
| 38 | FW | RUS | Tamerlan Bidzhiyev |
| 39 | DF | RUS | Andrei Demchenko |
| 40 | FW | RUS | Sayputtin Davydov |
| 43 | GK | RUS | Konstantin Bosikov |
| 44 | DF | RUS | Anton Smirnov |
| 45 | DF | RUS | Anton Lazutkin |
| 46 | DF | RUS | Nikita Kovalyov |
| 47 | MF | RUS | Andrei Sidenko |
| 48 | MF | RUS | Dmitri Mutyev |
| 50 | FW | RUS | Gennadi Kozlov |
| 51 | DF | RUS | Vladimir Shamara |

| No. | Pos. | Nation | Player |
|---|---|---|---|
| 52 | DF | RUS | Aleksandr Tundenkov |
| 54 | DF | RUS | Konstantin Kulabukhov |
| 56 | MF | RUS | Vladislav Kamilov |
| 57 | MF | RUS | Ruslan Shapovalov |
| 58 | MF | RUS | Dmitri Kartashov |
| 59 | MF | RUS | Artyom Yeskov |
| 62 | GK | RUS | Nikita Chagrov |
| 64 | FW | RUS | Andrei Fandeyev |
| 66 | DF | RUS | Igor Gubanov |
| 68 | DF | RUS | Andrei Zotov |
| 71 | MF | RUS | Maksim Miroshnichenko |
| 79 | MF | RUS | Nikita Mitin |
| — | MF | RUS | Nikita Gigolayev |
| — | MF | RUS | Sergei Mikhailov |
| — | MF | RUS | Vitali Ivanov |
| — | MF | RUS | Veniamin Mednikov |

== Transfers ==
=== Summer ===
In: Note: Flags indicate national team as defined under FIFA eligibility rules; some limited exceptions apply. Players may hold more than one non-FIFA nationality.

| No. | Pos. | Nation | Player |
|---|---|---|---|
| 4 | DF | CIV | Igor Lolo (from (Russia) Kuban Krasnodar) |
| 8 | MF | UKR | Ihor Khudobyak (on loan from (Ukraine) Karpaty Lviv) |
| 10 | FW | RUS | Artyom Dzyuba (on loan from (Russia) Spartak Moscow) |
| 11 | FW | KOR | Yoo Byung-Soo (from (Saudi Arabia) Al-Hilal) |
| 15 | DF | ANG | Bastos (from (Angola) Petro de Luanda) |
| 16 | GK | BLR | Anton Amelchenko (from (Russia) Lokomotiv Moscow) |
| 17 | MF | RUS | Aleksandr Vasilyev (from (Russia) CSKA Moscow) |
| 19 | DF | CRO | Hrvoje Milić (from (Croatia) Istra 1961) |
| 22 | MF | RUS | Azim Fatullayev (from (Russia) Yenisey Krasnoyarsk) |
| 25 | DF | RUS | Arseniy Logashov (on loan from (Russia) Lokomotiv Moscow) |
| 49 | MF | GEO | Jano Ananidze (on loan from (Russia) Spartak Moscow) |
| 77 | DF | RUS | Kamil Agalarov (from (Russia) Anzhi Makhachkala) |

Out: Note: Flags indicate national team as defined under FIFA eligibility rules; some limited exceptions apply. Players may hold more than one non-FIFA nationality.

| No. | Pos. | Nation | Player |
|---|---|---|---|
| 3 | DF | SVK | Kornel Saláta (loan to (Russia) Tom Tomsk) |
| 4 | DF | NGR | Isaac Okoronkwo (end of contract) |
| 6 | MF | RUS | Nikita Vasilyev (on loan to (Russia) Torpedo Moscow) |
| 8 | MF | RUS | Dmitri Malyaka (to (Russia) Angusht Nazran) |
| 10 | FW | RUS | Dmitri Kirichenko (to (Russia) Mordovia Saransk) |
| 18 | DF | RUS | Vladimir Kisenkov (end of loan from (Russia) Dynamo Moscow) |
| 20 | MF | RUS | Sergey Belousov (on loan to (Russia) Shinnik Yaroslavl) |
| 21 | MF | RUS | Khoren Bayramyan (on loan to (Russia) Rotor Volgograd) |
| 22 | DF | RUS | Andrei Ivanov (end of loan from (Russia) Lokomotiv Moscow) |
| 25 | GK | RUS | Nikolai Zabolotny (end of loan from (Russia) Spartak Moscow) |
| 30 | DF | RUS | Maksim Belyayev (end of loan from (Russia) Lokomotiv Moscow) |
| 33 | DF | RUS | Inal Getigezhev (to (Russia) Rubin Kazan) |
| 69 | FW | CZE | Jan Holenda (loan to (Russia) Tom Tomsk) |
| 70 | FW | RUS | Magomed Kurbanov (to (Russia) FC Taganrog) |
| 77 | FW | SRB | Danko Lazović (end of loan from (Russia) Zenit Saint Petersburg) |
| 77 | DF | RUS | Kamil Agalarov (loan to (Russia) Anzhi Makhachkala) |
| 81 | MF | ROU | Răzvan Cociș (to (Ukraine) Hoverla Uzhhorod) |
| 87 | FW | USA | Eugene Starikov (end of loan from (Russia) Zenit Saint Petersburg) |

=== Winter ===
In: Note: Flags indicate national team as defined under FIFA eligibility rules; some limited exceptions apply. Players may hold more than one non-FIFA nationality.

| No. | Pos. | Nation | Player |
|---|---|---|---|
| 7 | MF | RUS | Georgy Gabulov (from (Russia) Alania Vladikavkaz) |
| 33 | MF | RUS | Roman Yemelyanov (loan from (Ukraine) Shakhtar Donetsk) |

Out: Note: Flags indicate national team as defined under FIFA eligibility rules; some limited exceptions apply. Players may hold more than one non-FIFA nationality.

| No. | Pos. | Nation | Player |
|---|---|---|---|
| 7 | MF | RUS | Aleksandr Sheshukov (to (Russia) Lokomotiv Moscow) |
| 17 | FW | RUS | Aleksandr Vasilyev (loan to (Russia) Sibir Novosibirsk) |
| 22 | MF | RUS | Igor Kireyev (loan to (Russia) Spartak Nalchik) |

== Competitions ==
=== Friendlies ===
| 27 June 2013 | Rostov (Russia) | 1–2 | (Ukraine) Arsenal Kyiv | Bakovci, Slovenia |
| 20:00 MSK (UTC+4) | | [ Summary] | | Stadium: ŠRC Bakovci |

| 30 June 2013 | Rostov (Russia) | 2–1 | (Croatia) Zadar | Bakovci, Slovenia |
| MSK (UTC+4) | | [ Summary] | | Stadium: ŠRC Bakovci |

| 3 July 2013 | Rostov (Russia) | 3–0 | (Romania) Brașov | Bad Radkersburg, Austria |
| MSK (UTC+4) | | [ Summary] | | Stadium: Thermen-Arena |

| 22 January 2014 | Bunyodkor (Uzbekistan) | 1–1 | (Russia) Rostov |
| 16:00 MSK (UTC+4) | | Summary |

=== Russian Premier League ===
==== Results by round ====
| Round | 1 | 2 | 3 | 4 | 5 | 6 | 7 | 8 | 9 | 10 | 11 | 12 | 13 | 14 | 15 | 16 | 17 | 18 | 19 | 20 | 21 | 22 | 23 | 24 | 25 | 26 | 27 | 28 | 29 | 30 |
|---|---|---|---|---|---|---|---|---|---|---|---|---|---|---|---|---|---|---|---|---|---|---|---|---|---|---|---|---|---|---|
| Ground | H | H | H | A | H | A | A | A | H | A | H | A | H | A | H | A | A | H | H | H | A | H | A | H | A | A | H | H | H | A |
| Result | W | D | W | W | W | L | D | L | L | L | D | D | L | L | D | W | W | D | L | D | W | D | W | W | L | L | D | L | W | L |
| Position | 4 | 8 | 2 | 2 | 1 | 2 | 4 | 5 | 6 | 7 | 8 | 8 | 8 | 9 | 10 | 9 | 8 | 8 | 9 | 9 | 8 | 8 | 8 | 8 | 8 | 8 | 8 | 9 | 7 | 7 |

Updated to match(es) played on 16 May 2014. Source: Russian Premier League
A = Away; H = Home; W = Win; D = Draw; L = Loss

==== Matches ====
| 15 July 2013 1 | Rostov | 2–1 | Terek Grozny | Rostov-on-Don |
| 20:00 MSK (UTC+4) | Dzyuba 89' (pen.), 90+2' | Summary | Aílton 71' (pen.) | Stadium: Olimp – 2 Attendance: 9,500; Referee: Maxim Layushkin |

| 21 July 2013 2 | Rostov | 2–2 | Krasnodar | Rostov-on-Don |
| 20:00 MSK (UTC+4) | Kalachev 17'; Dzyuba 49' | Summary | Abreu 15'; Wánderson 88' | Stadium: Olimp – 2 Attendance: 10,500; Referee: Evgeny Turbin |

| 27 July 2013 3 | Rostov | 3–0 | Tom Tomsk | Rostov-on-Don |
| 20:00 MSK (UTC+4) | Dzyuba 3', 65', 84' (pen.) | Summary | | Stadium: Olimp – 2 Attendance: 9,700; Referee: Sergey Lapochkin |

| 2 August 2013 4 | Anzhi Makhachkala | 0–1 | Rostov | Kaspiysk |
| 20:00 MSK (UTC+4) | | Summary | Kanga 53' | Stadium: Anzhi-Arena; Attendance: 21,000; Referee: Igor Fedotov |

| 19 August 2013 5 | Rostov | 4–0 | Volga Nizhny Novgorod | Rostov-on-Don |
| 20:00 MSK (UTC+4) | Ananidze 50'; Kalachev 68'; Dzyuba 75'; Yoo 88' | Summary | Kolodin (yellow card) 55' (yellow-red card) 81' | Stadium: Olimp – 2 Attendance: 13,600; Referee: Sergey Karasev |

| 26 August 2013 6 | Lokomotiv Moscow | 5–0 | Rostov | Moscow |
| 20:00 MSK (UTC+4) | Caicedo 55'; Samedov 53' (pen.); Maicon 57'; Tarasov 62'; Pavlyuchenko 83' | Summary | Agalarov (red card) 52'; Lolo (yellow card) 45+2' (yellow-red card) 59' | Stadium: Lokomotiv Stadium; Attendance: 10,460; Referee: Igor Nizovtsev |

| 1 September 2013 7 | Dynamo Moscow | 1–1 | Rostov | Moscow |
| 20:15 MSK (UTC+4) | Kokorin 47' | Summary | Milic 7' | Stadium: Arena Khimki; Attendance: 5,175; Referee: Alexey Nikolaev |

| 14 September 2013 8 | CSKA Moscow | 1–0 | Rostov | Moscow |
| MSK (UTC+4) | Bazelyuk 70' | Summary | | Stadium: Arena Khimki; Attendance: 9,900; Referee: Vladislav Bezborodov |

| 22 September 2013 9 | Rostov | 0–4 | Zenit St. Petersburg | Rostov-on-Don |
| 20:30 MSK (UTC+4) | | Summary | Danny 50'; Arshavin 67'; Hulk 77'; Fayzulin 85' | Stadium: Olimp – 2 Attendance: 15,000; Referee: Timur Arslanbekov |

| 26 September 2013 10 | Amkar Perm | 1–0 | Rostov | Perm |
| 17:00 MSK (UTC+4) | Dyakov 13' (o.g.) | Summary | | Stadium: Zvezda Stadium; Attendance: 10,750; Referee: Mikhail Belov |

| 30 September 2013 11 | Rostov | 1–1 | Ural | Rostov-on-Don |
| 20:30 MSK (UTC+4) | Dzyuba 25'; Kalachev (yellow card) 55'; Lolo (yellow card) 61'; Sheshukov (yellow card) 70'; Dyakov (yellow card) 90+1' | Summary | Belozyorov 62'; Ottesen (yellow card) 65'; Manucharyan (yellow card) 88'; Gorbanets (yellow card) 90+1' | Stadium: Olimp – 2 Attendance: 8,500; Referee: Aleksei Matyunin |

| 6 October 2013 12 | Kuban Krasnodar | 2–2 | Rostov | Krasnodar |
| 20:15 MSK (UTC+4) | Baldé 48'; Cissé 72' | Summary | Dzyuba 19', 51' | Stadium: Kuban Stadium; Attendance: 8,321; Referee: Mikhail Vilkov |

| 20 October 2013 13 | Rostov | 1–2 | Krylia Sovetov | Rostov-on-Don |
| 15:45 MSK (UTC+4) | Gațcan 23' | Summary | Caballero 78'; Yeliseyev 90+2' | Stadium: Olimp – 2 Attendance: 10,800; Referee: Sergey Karasev |

| 26 October 2013 14 | Spartak Moscow | 2–0 | Rostov | Moscow |
| 19:30 MSK (UTC+4) | Movsisyan 15' (pen.); Costa 76' | Summary | | Stadium: Lokomotiv Stadium; Attendance: 15,000; Referee: Vitali Meshkov |

| 3 November 2013 15 | Rostov | 0–0 | Rubin Kazan | Rostov-on-Don |
| 15:45 MSK (UTC+4) | | Summary | | Stadium: Olimp – 2 Attendance: 8,500; Referee: Timur Arslanbekov |

| 8 November 2013 16 | Ural | 1–4 | Rostov | Yekaterinburg |
| 17:00 MSK (UTC+4) | Acevedo (red card) 38'; Gogniyev 88' | Summary | Dzyuba 5', 47'; Logashov 11'; Kanga 62' | Stadium: Central Stadium; Attendance: 6,090; Referee: Sergey Kuznetsov |

| 22 November 2013 17 | Zenit St. Petersburg | 0–2 | Rostov | Saint Petersburg |
| 19:00 MSK (UTC+4) | | Summary | Dyakov 18'; Kalachev 39' | Stadium: Petrovsky Stadium; Attendance: 17,457; Referee: Alexey Nikolaev |

| 2 December 2013 18 | Rostoz | 0–0 | CSKA Moscow | Rostov-on-Don |
| 17:00 MSK (UTC+4) | | Summary | | Stadium: Olimp – 2 Attendance: 14,200; Referee: Mikhail Vilkov |

| 8 December 2013 19 | Rostov | 0–1 | Spartak Moscow | Rostov-on-Don |
| 13:30 MSK (UTC+4) | | Summary | Waris 88' | Stadium: Olimp – 2 Attendance: 15,150; Referee: Sergey Lapochkin |

| 10 March 2014 20 | Rostov | 0–0 | Kuban Krasnodar | Rostov-on-Don |
| 19:00 MSK (UTC+4) | | Summary | | Stadium: Olimp – 2 Attendance: 13,100; Referee: Sergey Karasev |

| 15 March 2014 21 | Krylia Sovetov | 0–2 | Rostov | Samara |
| 13:30 MSK (UTC+4) | | Summary | Kanga 35'; Dyakov 70' | Stadium: Metallurg Stadium; Attendance: 11,570; Referee: Igor Fedotov |

| 21 March 2014 22 | Rostov | 2–2 | Amkar Perm | Rostov-on-Don |
| 19:00 MSK (UTC+4) | Kalachev 18'; Dzyuba 88'; Dyakov 90' | Summary | Wawrzyniak 4'; Ogude 28'; Kolomeytsev 49'; Wawrzyniak (yellow card) 57' (yellow-red card) 72' | Stadium: Olimp – 2 Attendance: 9,000; Referee: Aleksey Eskov |

| 30 March 2014 23 | Rubin Kazan | 1–2 | Rostov | Kazan |
| 18:00 MSK (UTC+4) | Azmoun 3'; Ryzhikov (red card) | Summary | Kalachev 32'; Ananidze 44' | Stadium: Kazan Arena; Attendance: 3,271; Referee: Sergey Lapochkin |

| 6 April 2014 24 | Krasnodar | 0–2 | Rostov | Krasnodar |
| 18:30 MSK (UTC+4) | | Summary | Ananidze 45+1'; Dzyuba 90+4' (pen.) | Stadium: Kuban Stadium; Attendance: 10,600; Referee: Alexey Nikolaev |

| 12 April 2014 25 | Terek Grozny | 3–0 | Rostov | Grozny |
| 17:00 MSK (UTC+4) | Maurício 25' (pen.); Aílton 41', 78' (pen.); Utsiev (yellow card) 37' (yellow-red card) 42' | Summary | Kanga (red card) 34' | Stadium: Akhmat-Arena; Referee: Sergey Karasev |

| 21 April 2014 26 | Volga Nizhny Novgorod | 2–1 | Rostov | Nizhny Novgorod |
| 19:00 MSK (UTC+4) | Polczak 1'; Sarkisov 64' | Summary | Dzyuba 90' | Stadium: Lokomotiv Stadium; Attendance: 3,500; Referee: Vasiliy Kazartsev |

| 27 April 2014 27 | Rostov | 1–1 | Anzhi Makhachkala | Rostov-on-Don |
| 16:00 MSK (UTC+4) | Dzyuba 22' (pen.); Gațcan (yellow card) 28' (yellow-red card) 61'; Pongolle (red card) 89' | Summary | Bilyaletdinov 80' | Stadium: Olimp – 2 Attendance: 12,000; Referee: Sergey Lapochkin |

| 2 May 2014 28 | Rostov | 2–3 | Dynamo Moscow | Rostov-on-Don |
| 19:00 MSK (UTC+4) | Dzyuba 75'; Yoo 85' | Summary | Ionov 1', 17'; Kokorin 68' | Stadium: Olimp – 2 Attendance: 9,150; Referee: Igor Nizovtsev |

| 11 May 2014 29 | Rostov | 2–0 | Lokomotiv Moscow | Rostov-on-Don |
| 20:15 MSK (UTC+4) | Dyakov 18'; Kalachev 68' | Summary | | Stadium: Olimp – 2 Attendance: 12,200; Referee: Mikhail Vilkov |

| 15 May 2014 30 | Tom Tomsk | 3–2 | Rostov | Tomsk |
| 18:30 MSK (UTC+4) | Nyakhaychyk 7'; Panchenko 52', 55' | Summary | Poloz 83'; Kanga (red card) 84'; Pongolle 89' | Stadium: Trud Stadium; Attendance: 4,500; Referee: Timur Arslanbekov |

==== League table ====
| Pos | Team | Pld | W | D | L | GF | GA | GD | Pts | Qualification or relegation |
|---|---|---|---|---|---|---|---|---|---|---|
| 5 | Krasnodar | 30 | 15 | 5 | 10 | 46 | 39 | +7 | 50 (Note: Krasnodar ahead of Spartak Moscow on head-to-head points; Krasnodar–Spartak Moscow 4–0, Spartak Moscow–Krasnodar 3–2.) | Qualification for the Europa League second qualifying round |
| 6 | Spartak Moscow | 30 | 15 | 5 | 10 | 46 | 36 | +10 | 50 | |
| 7 | Rostov | 30 | 10 | 9 | 11 | 40 | 40 | 0 | 39 | Qualification for the Europa League play-off round (Note: Rostov won the 2013–14 Russian Cup, therefore qualifying for the play-off round of the 2014–15 UEFA Europa League. However, it did not pass the Russian Football Union European licensing and thus its spot was given to Spartak. However, that RFU decision was then overturned by the CAS and Rostov was returned to the Europa League.) |
| 8 | Kuban Krasnodar | 30 | 10 | 8 | 12 | 40 | 42 | −2 | 38 | |
| 9 | Rubin Kazan | 30 | 9 | 11 | 10 | 36 | 30 | +6 | 38 (Note: Rubin Kazan ahead of Amkar Perm on head-to-head points; Rubin Kazan–Amkar Perm 3–0, Amkar Perm–Rubin Kazan 0–0.) | |

Source: Russian Premier League
Rules for classification: 1) points; 2) number of wins; 3) head-to-head points; 4) number of head-to-head wins; 5) head-to-head goal difference; 6) number of head-to-head goals scored; 7) number of head-to-head away goals scored; 8) goal difference; 9) number of goals scored; 10) number of away goals scored; 11) position in the 2012–13 season (only used until all the regularly scheduled games have been played); 11) extra play-off game or tournament between the teams in question.

=== Russian Cup ===
| 30 October 2013 Round of 32 | Angusht Nazran | 0–1 | Rostov | Nazran |
| 15:00 MSK (UTC+4) | Guguyev (yellow card) 66' (yellow-red card) 88' | Summary | Vasilyev 5' | Stadium: Rashid Aushev Central Stadium; Attendance: 2,600; Referee: Aleksei Matyunin |

| 2 March 2014 Round of 16 | Rostov | 3–0 awarded | Alania Vladikavkaz | Rostov-on-Don |
| MSK (UTC+4) | | Summary | | Stadium: Olimp – 2 |

| 26 March 2014 Quarterfinals | Rostov | 3–0 | Rotor Volgograd | Rostov-on-Don |
| 20:00 MSK (UTC+4) | Gațcan 9'; Ananidze 60'; Dzyuba 75' | Summary | | Stadium: Olimp – 2 Attendance: 13,200; Referee: Timur Arslanbekov |

| 17 April 2014 Semifinals | Rostov | 3–1 | Luch-Energiya | Rostov-on-Don |
| 19:30 MSK (UTC+4) | Gațcan 13'; Ananidze 27'; Dzyuba 90+5' (pen.) | Summary | Romanenko 39'; Ponomarenko (yellow card) 17' (yellow-red card) 90+4' | Stadium: Olimp – 2 Attendance: 14,500; Referee: Aleksandr Egorov |

| 8 May 2014 Final | Krasnodar | 0–0 (5–6 p) | Rostov | Kaspiysk |
| 18:30 MSK (UTC+4) | Pereyra (red card) 71' | Summary | Bastos (red card) 100' | Stadium: Anzhi-Arena; Attendance: 19,500; Referee: Sergei Karasev |
| | Penalties |
| | Granqvist (penalty scored); Abreu (penalty scored); Laborde (penalty scored); Joãozinho (penalty scored); Ari (penalty scored); Sigurðsson (penalty missed); Gazinskiy (penalty missed) | | (penalty scored) Milić; (penalty scored) Poloz; (penalty scored) Dyakov; (penalty scored) Sinama Pongolle; (penalty scored) Dzyuba; (penalty missed) Gațcan; (penalty scored) Lolo |

== Squad statistics ==
As of Match played 15 May 2014

=== Appearances and goals ===
| No. | Pos | Nat | Player | Total | | Premier League | | Russian Cup | |
| No. | Pos | Nat | Player | Apps | Goals | Apps | Goals | Apps | Goals |
|---|---|---|---|---|---|---|---|---|---|
| 1 | GK | (Croatia) CRO | Stipe Pletikosa | 30 | 0 | 27+0 | 0 | 3+0 | 0 |
| 2 | MF | (Belarus) BLR | Timofei Kalachev | 29 | 6 | 26+0 | 6 | 3+0 | 0 |
| 5 | DF | (Russia) RUS | Vitali Dyakov | 32 | 4 | 29+0 | 4 | 3+0 | 0 |
| 7 | MF | (Russia) RUS | Georgy Gabulov | 10 | 0 | 3+5 | 0 | 0+2 | 0 |
| 8 | MF | (Ukraine) UKR | Ihor Khudobyak | 13 | 0 | 4+8 | 0 | 1+0 | 0 |
| 9 | MF | (Gabon) GAB | Guélor Kanga | 27 | 3 | 23+1 | 3 | 2+1 | 0 |
| 10 | FW | (Russia) RUS | Artem Dzyuba | 31 | 19 | 28+0 | 17 | 3+0 | 2 |
| 11 | FW | (South Korea) KOR | Yoo Byung-Soo | 19 | 2 | 2+15 | 2 | 1+1 | 0 |
| 14 | FW | (Russia) RUS | Dmitry Poloz | 30 | 1 | 11+16 | 1 | 1+2 | 0 |
| 15 | DF | (Angola) ANG | Bastos | 21 | 0 | 17+0 | 0 | 4+0 | 0 |
| 16 | GK | (Belarus) BLR | Anton Amelchenko | 4 | 0 | 3+0 | 0 | 1+0 | 0 |
| 18 | MF | (Russia) RUS | Azim Fatullayev | 18 | 0 | 9+5 | 0 | 4+0 | 0 |
| 19 | DF | (Croatia) CRO | Hrvoje Milic | 29 | 1 | 21+4 | 1 | 4+0 | 0 |
| 24 | FW | (France) FRA | Florent Sinama Pongolle | 11 | 1 | 2+6 | 1 | 1+2 | 0 |
| 25 | DF | (Russia) RUS | Arseniy Logashov | 26 | 1 | 23+0 | 1 | 3+0 | 0 |
| 27 | DF | (Ivory Coast) CIV | Igor Lolo | 17 | 0 | 11+3 | 0 | 1+2 | 0 |
| 33 | MF | (Russia) RUS | Roman Yemelyanov | 7 | 0 | 4+3 | 0 | 0+0 | 0 |
| 34 | DF | (Russia) RUS | Timofei Margasov | 8 | 0 | 4+3 | 0 | 1+0 | 0 |
| 42 | MF | (Russia) RUS | Artyom Kulishev | 3 | 0 | 0+2 | 0 | 0+1 | 0 |
| 49 | MF | (Georgia (country)) GEO | Jano Ananidze | 25 | 5 | 20+2 | 3 | 3+0 | 2 |
| 55 | DF | (South Africa) RSA | Siyanda Xulu | 16 | 0 | 12+3 | 0 | 1+0 | 0 |
| 84 | MF | (Moldova) MDA | Alexandru Gațcan | 28 | 3 | 25+0 | 1 | 3+0 | 2 |
| 99 | FW | (Montenegro) MNE | Nemanja Nikolić | 2 | 0 | 0+2 | 0 | 0+0 | 0 |
Players away from the club on loan:
| 3 | DF | (Slovakia) SVK | Kornel Saláta | 2 | 0 | 2+0 | 0 | 0+0 | 0 |
| 17 | MF | (Russia) RUS | Aleksandr Vasilyev | 1 | 1 | 0+0 | 0 | 1+0 | 1 |
| 77 | DF | (Russia) RUS | Kamil Agalarov | 5 | 0 | 5+0 | 0 | 0+0 | 0 |
Players who appeared for Rostov no longer at the club:
| 7 | MF | (Russia) RUS | Aleksandr Sheshukov | 20 | 0 | 19+0 | 0 | 0+1 | 0 |

=== Top scorers ===
| Place | Position | Nation | Number | Name | Russian Premier League | Russian Cup | Total |
|---|---|---|---|---|---|---|---|
| 1 | FW | (Russia) | 10 | Artem Dzyuba | 17 | 2 | 19 |
| 2 | MF | (Belarus) | 2 | Timofei Kalachev | 6 | 0 | 6 |
| 2 | MF | (Georgia (country)) | 49 | Jano Ananidze | 3 | 2 | 5 |
| 4 | DF | (Russia) | 5 | Vitali Dyakov | 4 | 0 | 4 |
| 5 | MF | (Gabon) | 9 | Guélor Kanga | 3 | 0 | 3 |
| 5 | MF | (Moldova) | 84 | Alexandru Gațcan | 1 | 2 | 3 |
| 7 | FW | (South Korea) | 11 | Yoo Byung-Soo | 2 | 0 | 2 |
| 8 | DF | (Croatia) | 18 | Hrvoje Milic | 1 | 0 | 1 |
| 8 | DF | (Russia) | 25 | Arseniy Logashov | 1 | 0 | 1 |
| 8 | FW | (Russia) | 14 | Dmitry Poloz | 1 | 0 | 1 |
| 8 | FW | (France) | 24 | Florent Sinama Pongolle | 1 | 0 | 1 |
| 8 | MF | (Russia) | 17 | Aleksandr Vasilyev | 0 | 1 | 1 |
| | | | | Awarded Goals | 0 | 3 | 3 |
| | | | | TOTALS | 40 | 10 | 50 |

=== Disciplinary record ===
| Number | Nation | Position | Name | Russian Premier League | | Russian Cup | | Total | |
| Number | Nation | Position | Name | Yellow card | Red card | Yellow card | Red card | Yellow card | Red card |
| 1 | (Croatia) | GK | Stipe Pletikosa | 3 | 0 | 0 | 0 | 3 | 0 |
| 2 | (Belarus) | MF | Timofei Kalachev | 9 | 0 | 1 | 0 | 10 | 0 |
| 3 | (Slovakia) | DF | Kornel Saláta | 2 | 0 | 0 | 0 | 2 | 0 |
| 5 | (Russia) | DF | Vitali Dyakov | 4 | 0 | 0 | 0 | 4 | 0 |
| 7 | (Russia) | MF | Aleksandr Sheshukov | 2 | 0 | 0 | 0 | 2 | 0 |
| 7 | (Russia) | MF | Georgy Gabulov | 1 | 0 | 0 | 0 | 1 | 0 |
| 8 | (Ukraine) | MF | Ihor Khudobyak | 0 | 0 | 1 | 0 | 1 | 0 |
| 9 | (Gabon) | MF | Guélor Kanga | 8 | 2 | 0 | 0 | 8 | 2 |
| 10 | (Russia) | FW | Artyom Dzyuba | 2 | 0 | 0 | 0 | 2 | 0 |
| 11 | (South Korea) | FW | Yoo Byung-Soo | 1 | 0 | 0 | 0 | 1 | 0 |
| 14 | (Russia) | FW | Dmitry Poloz | 1 | 0 | 0 | 0 | 1 | 0 |
| 15 | (Angola) | DF | Bastos | 3 | 0 | 3 | 1 | 6 | 1 |
| 19 | (Croatia) | DF | Hrvoje Milic | 2 | 0 | 0 | 0 | 2 | 0 |
| 24 | (France) | FW | Florent Sinama Pongolle | 2 | 1 | 1 | 0 | 3 | 1 |
| 25 | (Russia) | DF | Arseniy Logashov | 2 | 0 | 1 | 0 | 3 | 0 |
| 27 | (Ivory Coast) | DF | Igor Lolo | 6 | 1 | 0 | 0 | 6 | 1 |
| 33 | (Russia) | MF | Roman Yemelyanov | 1 | 0 | 0 | 0 | 1 | 0 |
| 34 | (Russia) | MF | Timofei Margasov | 1 | 0 | 0 | 0 | 1 | 0 |
| 49 | (Georgia (country)) | MF | Jano Ananidze | 1 | 0 | 1 | 0 | 2 | 0 |
| 55 | (South Africa) | DF | Siyanda Xulu | 2 | 0 | 0 | 0 | 2 | 0 |
| 77 | (Russia) | DF | Kamil Agalarov | 1 | 1 | 0 | 0 | 1 | 1 |
| 84 | (Moldova) | MF | Alexandru Gațcan | 9 | 1 | 0 | 0 | 9 | 1 |
| | | | TOTALS | 64 | 6 | 8 | 1 | 72 | 7 |
