= Kalachyov =

Kalachyov or Kalachow or Kalachev (Belarusian: Калачоў, Russian: Калачёв) is a surname of Slavic-language origin. It may refer to:

- Dzmitry Kalachow (born 1978), a Belarusian footballer
- Ilya Kalachyov (born 2000), a Russian footballer
- Timofey Kalachyov (born 1981), a Belarusian footballer
