= Sidenko =

Sidenko is a surname. Notable people with the surname include:

- Andrei Sidenko (born 1995), Russian footballer
- Konstantin Sidenko (born 1953), Russian admiral
