= Bastos (footballer, born 1991) =

Angolan footballer

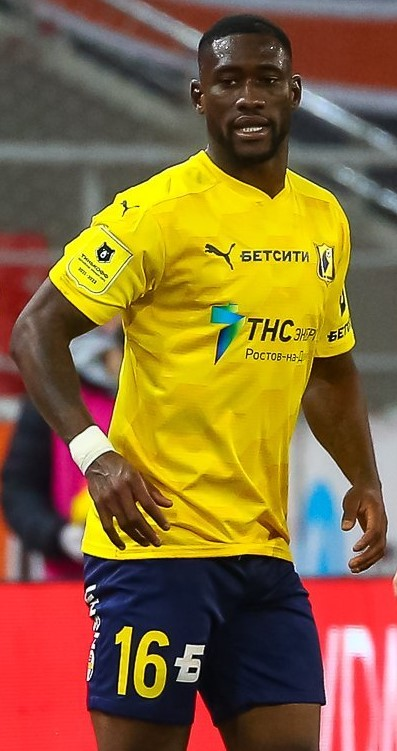
- Bastos with Rostov in 2021

Personal information
- Full name: Bartolomeu Jacinto Quissanga
- Date of birth: 27 March 1991 (age 35)
- Place of birth: Luanda, Angola
- Height: 1.84 m (6 ft 0 in)
- Position: Centre-back

Team information
- Current team: Fortaleza
- Number: 34

Senior career*
| Years | Team | Apps | (Gls) |
| 2010–2013 | Petro Atlético | 105 | (6) |
| 2013–2016 | Rostov | 73 | (4) |
| 2016–2020 | Lazio | 68 | (6) |
| 2020–2022 | Al-Ain | 22 | (2) |
| 2021–2022 | → Rostov (loan) | 14 | (1) |
| 2022–2023 | Al-Ahli | 24 | (3) |
| 2023–2026 | Botafogo | 42 | (3) |
| 2026– | Fortaleza | 0 | (0) |

International career^{‡}
| 2011– | Angola | 58 | (2) |
- * Club domestic league appearances and goals ‡ National team caps and goals as of 15 October 2024

Bartolomeu Jacinto Quissanga (born 27 March 1991), known as Bastos, is an Angolan professional footballer who plays as a centre-back for Campeonato Brasileiro Série B club Fortaleza and the Angola national team. In 2024, he became the first African player to win the Copa Libertadores.

== Club career ==
Bastos began his career in his native country Angola. Between 2011 and 2013 he played with Petro Atlético de Luanda in 105 games where he scored 6 goals and also won the Taça de Angola twice.

=== Rostov ===
On 11 July 2013, Bastos signed a three-year contract with Russian Premier League side FC Rostov. He played a key role in winning the first Russian Cup for his club Rostov in the final against FC Krasnodar.

=== Lazio ===
On 17 August 2016, Lazio announced the signing of Bastos for €5 million. He scored his first goal for the club on 17 September 2017, a 3–2 away win over Genoa.

=== Al-Ain ===
On 22 October 2020, after playing in two of Lazio's opening matches of the 2020–21 Serie A season, Bastos joined Saudi club Al-Ain on a permanent basis.

==== Rostov loan ====
On 5 August 2021, Bastos returned to Rostov on loan for the 2021–22 season.

On 24 February 2022, the Russian invasion of Ukraine began, with the airports based in the provinces that were close to Ukraine were ordered closed until 2 March, including Platov International Airport in Rostov-on-Don. On 7 March 2022, FIFA announced that foreign players in Russia would be able to unilaterally suspend their contracts with their clubs until 30 June 2022 and sign with a club outside of Russia until 30 June 2022. Bastos made use of the rule alongside fellow Rostov teammates Dennis Hadžikadunić, Armin Gigović, Pontus Almqvist and Magnus Nordengen Knudsen, all of whom left on special leave for various European clubs. Bastos had reached an agreement with Bundesliga club Arminia Bielefeld. However, on 17 March 2022, the German Football Association (DFB) announced that the transfer window in Germany would not be re-opened and players from the Russian and Ukrainian leagues would not be allowed to be registered in official national competitions to "maintain the sporting integrity of the competitions", despite FIFA giving permission to do so.

Despite his transfer being blocked by the DFB, Bastos suspension was upheld and he would not make another appearance for Rostov during the 2021–22 season.

=== Al-Ahli ===
On 8 September 2022, Bastos joined Saudi Arabian club Al-Ahli on a free transfer.

=== Botafogo ===
In August 2023, Botafogo announced the signing of the defender with a contract until the end of 2024. In November 2024, he won the Copa Libertadores with Botafogo. Bastos became the first African player to win the Copa Libertadores.

The following season, however, he struggled with a left knee injury. The Angolan first felt it on the field against Nova Iguaçu in February, still in the Campeonato Carioca.

After the injury, he traveled with the Botafogo squad to the Club World Cup in the United States. Lacking in fitness, Bastos was left on the bench, and before the team's participation in the competition ended, he felt the pain and returned to Brazil for treatment.

In early July, Botafogo confirmed the need for surgery on his left knee and gave him a three-month recovery period. With the club's approval, Bastos underwent surgery in Italy with Dr. Tiago Carminati.

== International career ==
Bastos debuted for his country in a 0–0 draw against Liberia on 10 August 2011. He represented Angola at the 2013 Africa Cup of Nations.

== Personal life ==
In November 2016, Bastos' younger brother Nandinho signed for Rostov.

== Career statistics ==
=== Club ===
As of match played 7 February 2025

Appearances and goals by club, season and competition
| Club | Season | League | | | State league (Note: Includes Campeonato Carioca) | | National cup (Note: Includes Russian Cup, Coppa Italia, King's Cup, Copa do Brasil) | | Continental | | Other | | Total | |
| Club | Season | Division | Apps | Goals | Apps | Goals | Apps | Goals | Apps | Goals | Apps | Goals | Apps | Goals |
|---|---|---|---|---|---|---|---|---|---|---|---|---|---|---|
| Rostov | 2013–14 | Russian Premier League | 17 | 0 | — | | 4 | 0 | — | | — | | 21 | 0 |
| Rostov | 2014–15 | Russian Premier League | 27 | 1 | — | | 0 | 0 | 2 (Note: Appearances in UEFA Europa League) | 0 | 2 (Note: Appearances in Russian Premier League relegation play-offs) | 0 | 31 | 1 |
| Rostov | 2015–16 | Russian Premier League | 26 | 3 | — | | 0 | 0 | — | | 1 (Note: Appearance in Russian Super Cup) | 0 | 27 | 3 |
| Rostov | 2016–17 | Russian Premier League | 3 | 0 | — | | 0 | 0 | 2 (Note: Appearances in UEFA Champions League) | 0 | — | | 5 | 0 |
| Rostov | Total | | 73 | 4 | — | | 4 | 0 | 4 | 0 | 3 | 0 | 84 | 4 |
| Lazio | 2016–17 | Serie A | 11 | 0 | — | | 3 | 0 | — | | — | | 14 | 0 |
| Lazio | 2017–18 | Serie A | 21 | 4 | — | | 1 | 0 | 6 | 1 | 0 | 0 | 28 | 5 |
| Lazio | 2018–19 | Serie A | 18 | 1 | — | | 5 | 0 | 5 | 0 | — | | 28 | 1 |
| Lazio | 2019–20 | Serie A | 16 | 1 | — | | 1 | 1 | 5 | 1 | 0 | 0 | 22 | 3 |
| Lazio | 2020–21 | Serie A | 2 | 0 | — | | 0 | 0 | 0 | 0 | — | | 2 | 0 |
| Lazio | Total | | 68 | 6 | — | | 10 | 1 | 16 | 2 | 0 | 0 | 94 | 9 |
| Al-Ain | 2020–21 | Saudi Pro League | 22 | 2 | — | | 2 | 0 | — | | — | | 24 | 2 |
| Rostov (loan) | 2021–22 | Russian Premier League | 14 | 1 | — | | 1 | 0 | — | | — | | 15 | 1 |
| Al-Ahli | 2022–23 | Saudi First Division | 24 | 3 | — | | 0 | 0 | — | | — | | 24 | 3 |
| Botafogo | 2023 | Série A | 4 | 0 | — | | — | | — | | — | | 4 | 0 |
| Botafogo | 2024 | Série A | 32 | 3 | 10 | 1 | 3 | 0 | 10 (Note: Appearances in Copa Libertadores) | 0 | — | | 55 | 4 |
| Botafogo | 2025 | Série A | 0 | 0 | 7 | 0 | 0 | 0 | 0 | 0 | 0 | 0 | 7 | 0 |
| Botafogo | Total | | 36 | 3 | 17 | 1 | 3 | 0 | 10 | 0 | 0 | 0 | 66 | 4 |
| Career total | | | 342 | 25 | 17 | 1 | 20 | 1 | 30 | 2 | 3 | 0 | 412 | 29 |

=== International ===
As of match played 17 November 2024

Angola
| Year | Apps | Goals |
| 2011 | 3 | 0 |
| 2012 | 11 | 0 |
| 2013 | 8 | 0 |
| 2014 | 7 | 2 |
| 2015 | 4 | 0 |
| 2016 | 2 | 0 |
| 2017 | 2 | 0 |
| 2018 | 6 | 0 |
| 2019 | 8 | 0 |
| 2020 | 0 | 0 |
| 2021 | 3 | 0 |
| 2024 | 4 | 0 |
| Total | 58 | 2 |

Scores and results list Angola's goal tally first.

| Goal | Date | Venue | Opponent | Score | Result | Competition |
|---|---|---|---|---|---|---|
| 1. | 28 May 2014 | Estádio Algarve, Algarve, Portugal | Morocco | 1–0 | 2–0 | Friendly |
| 2. | 15 October 2014 | Estádio 11 de Novembro, Luanda, Angola | Lesotho | 1–0 | 4–0 | 2015 Africa Cup of Nations qualification |

== Honours ==
Rostov

- Russian Cup: 2013–14

Lazio

- Coppa Italia: 2018–19
- Supercoppa Italiana: 2019

Al-Ahli

- Saudi First Division: 2022–23

Botafogo

- Série A: 2024
- Copa Libertadores: 2024
- Taça Rio: 2024

Angola

- Four Nations Tournament bronze medal: 2018

Individual

- Campeonato Brasileiro Série A Team of the Year: 2024
- Bola de Prata: 2024
