= Valeriu Catînsus =

Moldovan footballer

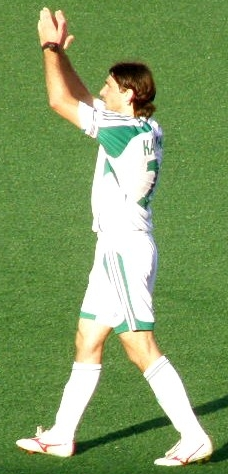
- Catînsus with Tom Tomsk in 2008

Personal information
- Date of birth: 27 April 1978 (age 48)
- Place of birth: Chişinău, Moldavian SSR
- Height: 1.82 m (6 ft 0 in)
- Position: Defender

Senior career*
Years	Team	Apps	(Gls)
1993–1997	Agro Chişinău	82	(10)
1998–2002	Zimbru Chişinău	121	(10)
2002–2004	Chornomorets Odesa	39	(1)
2004	Arsenal Tula	35	(1)
2005–2009	Tom Tomsk	123	(2)
2010–2015	Shinnik Yaroslavl	150	(0)

International career
1999–2009	Moldova	55	(0)
- * Club domestic league appearances and goals

Valeriu Catînsus (born 27 April 1978) is a former Moldovan football player.

== International career ==
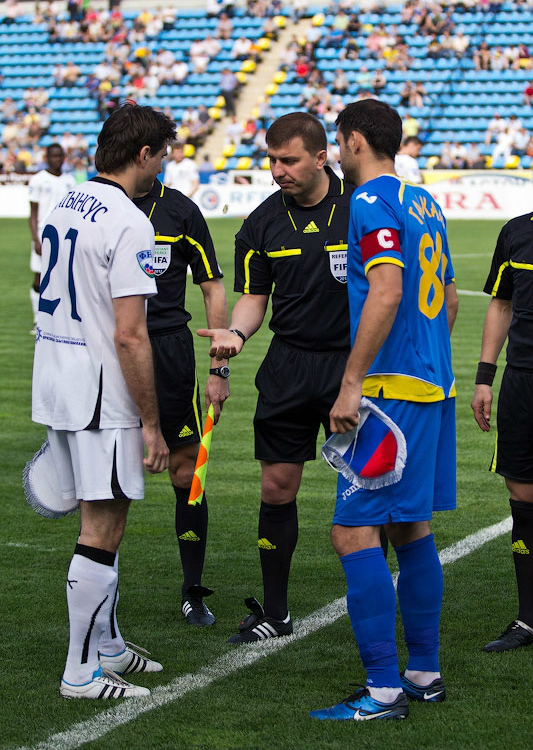
Catînsus vs Gațcan in a match FC Shinnik and FC Rostov in Russian championship on 18 May 2012

Catînsus has made 50 appearances for the Moldova national football team. He played 8 games in 2002 FIFA World Cup qualification (UEFA), 8 games in UEFA Euro 2004 qualifying, 10 games in 2006 FIFA World Cup qualification (UEFA) and 3 games in UEFA Euro 2008 qualifying. He played his last game against Latvia on 14 October 2009.
