= Alexandru Gațcan =

Moldovan footballer

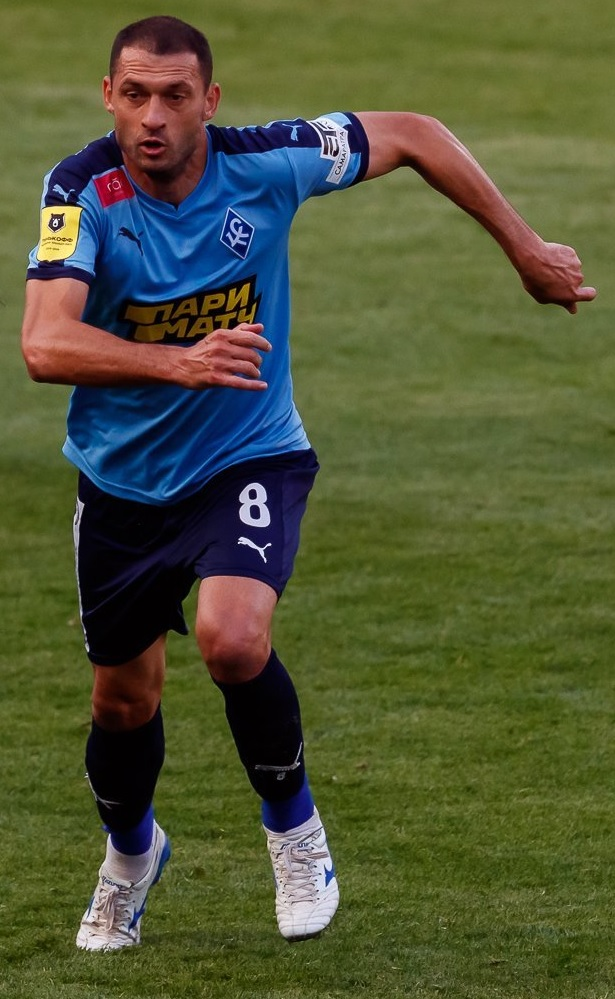
- Gațcan with Krylia Sovetov in 2020

Personal information
- Date of birth: 27 March 1984 (age 42)
- Place of birth: Chișinău, Moldavian SSR, Soviet Union
- Height: 1.85 m (6 ft 1 in)
- Position: Midfielder

Senior career*
| Years | Team | Apps | (Gls) |
| 2003–2004 | Unisport-Auto Chișinău | 23 | (3) |
| 2004 | Spartak Moscow | 0 | (0) |
| 2005 | Spartak Chelyabinsk | 36 | (2) |
| 2006–2008 | Rubin Kazan | 40 | (2) |
| 2008–2019 | Rostov | 275 | (21) |
| 2019–2021 | Krylia Sovetov Samara | 49 | (1) |
| Total | | 423 | (29) |

International career
| | Moldova U21 | 11 | (0) |
| 2005–2018 | Moldova | 63 | (5) |
- * Club domestic league appearances and goals

Alexandru Gațcan (born 27 March 1984) is a Moldovan former international footballer who played as a central midfielder.

== Career ==
=== Club ===
On 17 June 2019, Gațcan extended his contract with Rostov until the summer of 2020. On 17 July 2019, Rostov announced that Gațcan would leave the club after their match against Spartak Moscow on 20 July, ending his 11-year stint at the club.

On 23 July 2019, he joined Russian Premier League club Krylia Sovetov Samara.

=== International ===
Gațcan played 2 games in 2006 FIFA World Cup qualification (UEFA) and 7 games in UEFA Euro 2008 qualifying. Gațcan has appeared in 46 matches for the Moldova national football team, scoring three goals.

== Personal life ==
In 2007, Gațcan became a naturalized citizen of Russia.

== Career statistics ==
=== Club ===
As of 13 May 2018

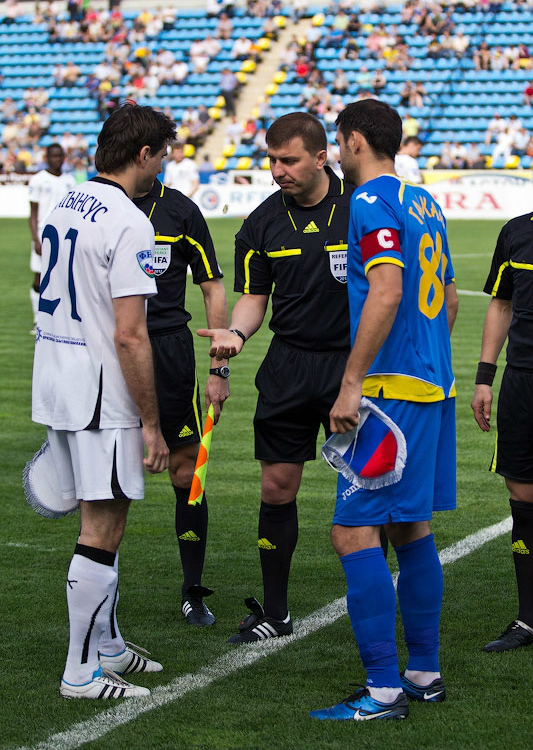
Valeriu Catînsus and Alexandru Gațcan in a match FC Shinnik and FC Rostov in Russian championship on 18 May 2012

| Club | Season | League | | | National Cup | | Continental | | Other | | Total | |
| Club | Season | Division | Apps | Goals | Apps | Goals | Apps | Goals | Apps | Goals | Apps | Goals |
|---|---|---|---|---|---|---|---|---|---|---|---|---|
| FC Spartak Moscow | 2004 | Russian Premier League | 0 | 0 | 0 | 0 | 0 | 0 | – | | 0 | 0 |
| FC Spartak Nizhny Novgorod | 2005 | FNL | 36 | 2 | 0 | 0 | – | | – | | 36 | 2 |
| FC Rubin Kazan | 2006 | Russian Premier League | 21 | 1 | 4 | 1 | 2 | 0 | – | | 27 | 2 |
| FC Rubin Kazan | 2007 | Russian Premier League | 19 | 1 | 3 | 1 | 2 | 0 | – | | 24 | 2 |
| FC Rubin Kazan | 2008 | Russian Premier League | 0 | 0 | 0 | 0 | – | | – | | 0 | 0 |
| FC Rubin Kazan | Total | | 40 | 2 | 7 | 2 | 4 | 0 | 0 | 0 | 51 | 4 |
| FC Rostov | 2008 | FNL | 14 | 3 | 0 | 0 | – | | – | | 14 | 3 |
| FC Rostov | 2009 | Russian Premier League | 26 | 4 | 0 | 0 | – | | – | | 26 | 4 |
| FC Rostov | 2010 | Russian Premier League | 24 | 0 | 0 | 0 | – | | – | | 24 | 0 |
| FC Rostov | 2011–12 | Russian Premier League | 35 | 4 | 5 | 0 | – | | 2 (Note: Two appearances in relegation play-offs) | 0 | 42 | 4 |
| FC Rostov | 2012–13 | Russian Premier League | 27 | 0 | 3 | 0 | – | | 2 (Note: Two appearances in relegation play-offs) | 0 | 32 | 0 |
| FC Rostov | 2013–14 | Russian Premier League | 25 | 1 | 3 | 2 | – | | – | | 28 | 3 |
| FC Rostov | 2014–15 | Russian Premier League | 26 | 1 | 0 | 0 | 2 | 0 | 3 (Note: Two appearances in relegation play-offs, one appearance in the Russian Super Cup) | 0 | 31 | 1 |
| FC Rostov | 2015–16 | Russian Premier League | 23 | 2 | 0 | 0 | – | | – | | 23 | 2 |
| FC Rostov | 2016–17 | Russian Premier League | 24 | 3 | 0 | 0 | 13 | 0 | – | | 37 | 3 |
| FC Rostov | 2017–18 | Russian Premier League | 26 | 2 | 2 | 0 | – | | – | | 28 | 2 |
| FC Rostov | 2018–19 | Russian Premier League | 24 | 1 | 5 | 1 | – | | – | | 29 | 2 |
| FC Rostov | 2019–20 | Russian Premier League | 1 | 0 | 0 | 0 | – | | – | | 1 | 0 |
| FC Rostov | Total | | 275 | 21 | 18 | 3 | 15 | 0 | 7 | 0 | 315 | 24 |
| Career total | | | 351 | 25 | 25 | 5 | 19 | 0 | 7 | 0 | 402 | 30 |

=== International ===
Moldova national team
| Year | Apps | Goals |
|---|---|---|
| 2005 | 3 | 1 |
| 2006 | 3 | 0 |
| 2007 | 7 | 0 |
| 2008 | 3 | 0 |
| 2009 | 4 | 0 |
| 2010 | 0 | 0 |
| 2011 | 2 | 0 |
| 2012 | 6 | 0 |
| 2013 | 7 | 0 |
| 2014 | 8 | 1 |
| 2015 | 4 | 1 |
| 2016 | 6 | 1 |
| 2017 | 3 | 1 |
| 2018 | 7 | 0 |
| Total | 63 | 5 |

Statistics accurate as of match played 18 November 2018

=== International goals ===
Scores and results list Moldova's goal tally first.

| No | Date | Venue | Opponent | Score | Result | Competition |
|---|---|---|---|---|---|---|
| 1. | 12 October 2005 | Stadio Via del Mare, Lecce, Italy | Italy | 1–1 | 1–2 | 2006 FIFA World Cup qualification |
| 2. | 24 May 2014 | Estadio Municipal de Chapín, Jerez de la Frontera, Spain | Saudi Arabia | 4–0 | 4–0 | Friendly |
| 3. | 18 February 2015 | Mardan Sports Complex, Aksu, Turkey | Kazakhstan | 1–1 | 1–1 | Friendly |
| 4. | 12 November 2016 | Boris Paichadze Dinamo Arena, Tbilisi, Georgia | Georgia | 1–1 | 1–1 | 2018 FIFA World Cup qualification |
| 5. | 19 March 2017 | San Marino Stadium, Serravalle, San Marino | San Marino | 2–0 | 2–0 | Friendly |

== Honours ==
FC Rostov

- Russian Cup: 2013–14

Individual

- Moldovan Footballer of the Year: 2013, 2015, 2016, 2017
