= Timofei Margasov =

Russian footballer

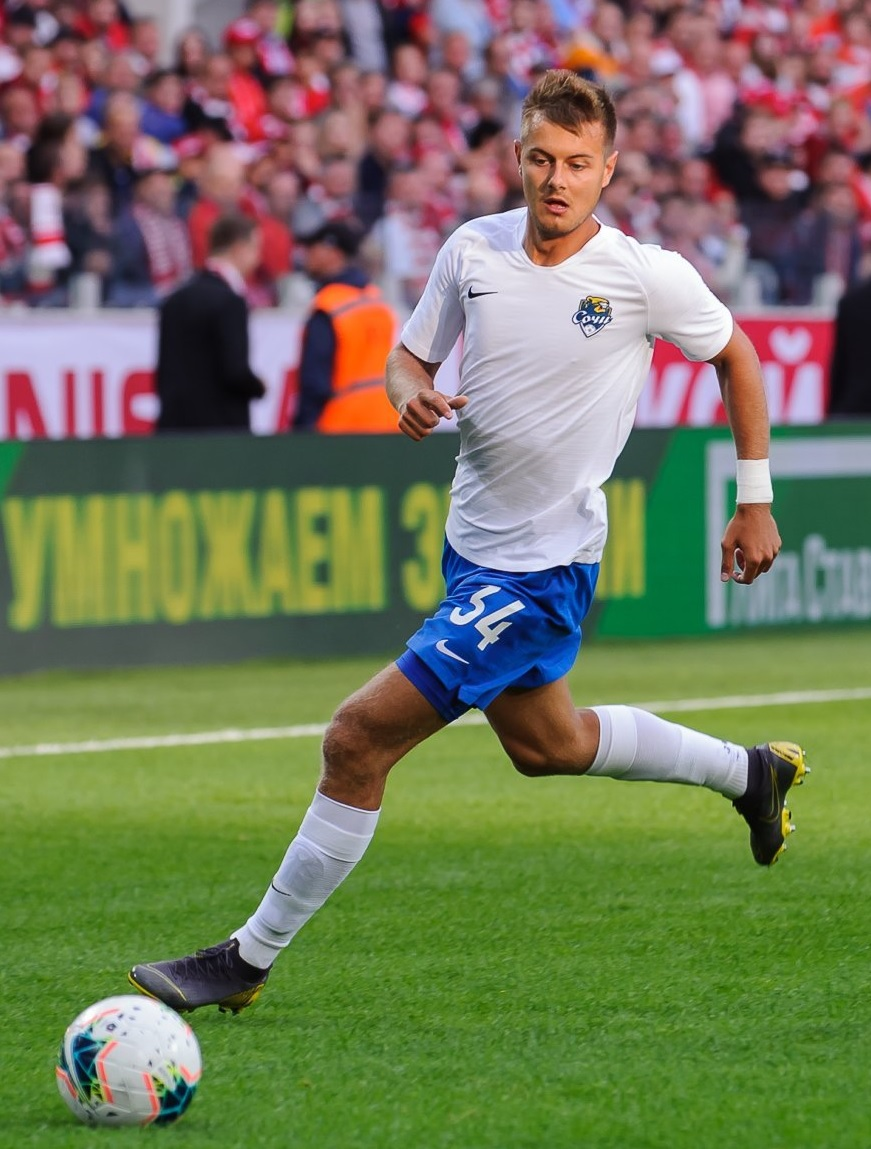
- Margasov with Sochi in 2019

Personal information
- Full name: Timofei Vyacheslavovich Margasov
- Date of birth: 12 June 1992 (age 34)
- Place of birth: Tolyatti, Russia
- Height: 1.81 m (5 ft 11 in)
- Positions: Right midfielder; right-back

Youth career
- 2000–2011: Konoplyov football academy

Senior career*
Years	Team	Apps	(Gls)
2011–2012	Akademiya Tolyatti	38	(0)
2012	Yenisey Krasnoyarsk	11	(0)
2013–2016	Rostov	39	(0)
2014–2015	→ Sibir Novosibirsk (loan)	26	(1)
2016	Krylia Sovetov Samara	5	(0)
2017–2019	Lokomotiv Moscow	2	(0)
2018	→ Tosno (loan)	9	(0)
2019–2020	→ Sochi (loan)	29	(0)
2020–2024	Sochi	97	(2)
2024–2026	Ural Yekaterinburg	39	(2)

International career
2014	Russia U-21	2	(0)
- * Club domestic league appearances and goals as of 16 May 2026

Timofei Vyacheslavovich Margasov (Russian: Тимофей Вячеславович Маргасов; born 12 June 1992) is a Russian professional footballer who plays as a right midfielder. He played for most of his career as a right-back.

== Club career ==
Margasov made his debut in the Russian Second Division for Akademiya Tolyatti on 24 April 2011 in a game against Oktan Perm.

He played as Tosno won the 2017–18 Russian Cup final against Avangard Kursk on 9 May 2018 in the Volgograd Arena.

On 22 February 2019, Margasov joined Sochi on loan until the end of the 2018–19 season.

On 4 August 2020 Margasov moved to Sochi on a permanent basis. On 30 May 2023, Margasov extended his contract with Sochi.

== Honours ==
=== Club ===
Rostov

- Russian Cup: 2013–14

Tosno

- Russian Cup: 2017–18

== Career statistics ==
As of 23 May 2026

Club	Season	League			Cup		Continental		Other		Total	
Club	Season	Division	Apps	Goals	Apps	Goals	Apps	Goals	Apps	Goals	Apps	Goals
Akademiya Tolyatti	2011–12	Russian Second League	38	0	1	0	–		–		39	0
Yenisey Krasnoyarsk	2012–13	Russian First League	11	0	2	0	–		–		13	0
Rostov	2012–13	Russian Premier League	7	0	2	0	–		2 (Note: Appearances in relegation play-offs)	0	11	0
Rostov	2013–14	Russian Premier League	7	0	1	0	–		–		8	0
Rostov	2015–16	Russian Premier League	25	0	0	0	–		–		25	0
Rostov	Total		39	0	3	0	0	0	2	0	44	0
Sibir Novosibirsk (loan)	2014–15	Russian First League	26	1	2	0	–		2 (Note: Appearances in the FNL Cup)	0	30	1
Krylia Sovetov Samara	2016–17	Russian Premier League	5	0	2	0	–		–		7	0
Lokomotiv Moscow	2016–17	Russian Premier League	2	0	1	0	–		–		3	0
Lokomotiv Moscow	2017–18	Russian Premier League	0	0	0	0	0	0	–		0	0
Lokomotiv Moscow	2018–19	Russian Premier League	0	0	0	0	0	0	–		0	0
Lokomotiv Moscow	Total		2	0	1	0	0	0	0	0	3	0
Tosno (loan)	2017–18	Russian Premier League	9	0	3	0	–		–		12	0
Sochi (loan)	2018–19	Russian First League	14	0	–		–		–		14	0
Sochi (loan)	2019–20	Russian Premier League	15	0	0	0	–		–		15	0
Sochi (loan)	Total		29	0	0	0	0	0	0	0	29	0
Sochi	2020–21	Russian Premier League	23	0	4	0	–		–		27	0
Sochi	2021–22	Russian Premier League	28	2	1	0	4 (Note: Appearances in the UEFA Conference League)	0	–		33	2
Sochi	2022–23	Russian Premier League	26	0	6	0	–		–		32	0
Sochi	2023–24	Russian Premier League	20	0	5	1	–		–		25	1
Sochi	Total		97	2	16	1	4	0	0	0	117	3
Ural Yekaterinburg	2024–25	Russian First League	22	1	3	0	–		0	0	25	1
Ural Yekaterinburg	2025–26	Russian First League	17	1	0	0	–		2 (Note: Appearances in promotion play-offs)	0	19	1
Ural Yekaterinburg	Total		39	2	3	0	0	0	2	0	44	2
Career total			295	5	33	1	4	0	6	0	338	6
