= Florent Sinama Pongolle =

French footballer (born 1984)

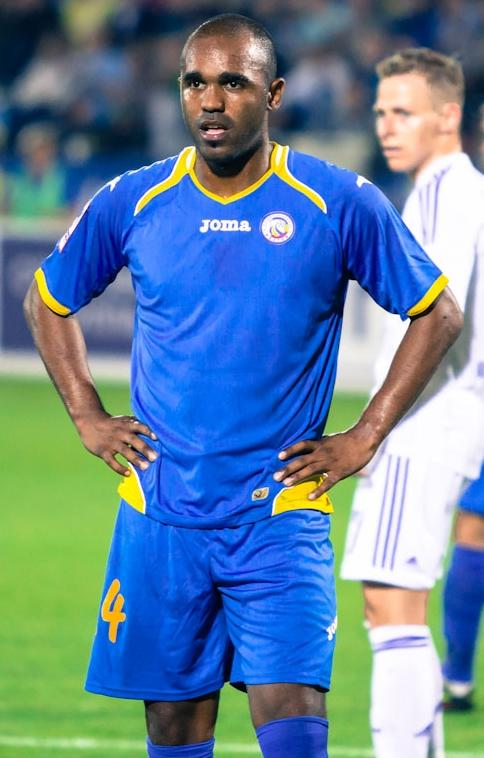
- Sinama Pongolle playing for Rostov in 2012

Personal information
- Full name: Florent Stéphane Sinama Pongolle
- Date of birth: 20 October 1984 (age 42)
- Place of birth: Saint-Pierre, Réunion, France
- Height: 1.76 m (5 ft 9 in)
- Position: Forward

Youth career
- Saint-Pierroise
- 1995–2001: Le Havre

Senior career*
| Years | Team | Apps | (Gls) |
| 2001–2006 | Liverpool | 38 | (4) |
| 2001–2003 | → Le Havre (loan) | 42 | (7) |
| 2006 | → Blackburn Rovers (loan) | 10 | (1) |
| 2006–2008 | Recreativo | 68 | (22) |
| 2008–2010 | Atlético Madrid | 40 | (5) |
| 2010–2012 | Sporting CP | 5 | (1) |
| 2010–2011 | → Zaragoza (loan) | 24 | (4) |
| 2011–2012 | → Saint-Étienne (loan) | 23 | (4) |
| 2012–2014 | Rostov | 18 | (2) |
| 2014 | Chicago Fire | 7 | (1) |
| 2015 | Lausanne-Sport | 0 | (0) |
| 2015–2016 | Dundee United | 4 | (0) |
| 2016–2018 | Chainat Hornbill | 62 | (33) |
| 2019 | Saint-Pierroise | 10 | (1) |
| Total | | 351 | (85) |

International career
| 2001 | France U17 | 6 | (9) |
| 2002–2006 | France U21 | 37 | (11) |
| 2008 | France | 1 | (0) |
Medal record
Representing France
FIFA U-17 World Cup
| Winner | 2001 Trinidad & Tobago |
- * Club domestic league appearances and goals

Florent Stéphane Sinama Pongolle (born 20 October 1984) is a French former professional footballer who played as a forward.

He was signed at only 16 by Liverpool, but could never impose himself in the first team. He also spent several seasons in Spain, with Recreativo, Atlético Madrid and Zaragoza.

Pongolle is now a pundit with Canal + in France.

== Early life ==
Sinama Pongolle was born in Saint-Pierre, Réunion.

== Club career ==
=== Liverpool ===
Sinama Pongolle began his career at hometown club Saint-Pierroise before moving to Le Havre in Metropolitan France at the age of 11. In 2001, he, along with his cousin Anthony Le Tallec, was signed by Liverpool, after some impressive performances in both the UEFA European Under-16 Championship and the FIFA Under-17 World Championship. He was named player of the tournament as France won the latter competition, and remained at Le Havre – as Le Tallec – for a further two years on loan.

After his return, Sinama Pongolle appeared sporadically for the Reds. He made his debut in a UEFA Cup tie against Olimpija Ljubljana and shortly afterwards scored his first goal in a league game against Leeds United. In Liverpool's victorious campaign in the UEFA Champions League, he came from the bench against Olympiacos and immediately scored Liverpool's equaliser to make it 1–1, in an eventual 3–1 win and qualification to the round of 16. However in a League Cup tie against Watford in January 2005 he picked up a knee injury, meaning he missed the rest of the season including Liverpool's victory in the Champions League final.

Sinama Pongolle also netted in the third round of the 2005–06 FA Cup against Luton Town, as he helped Liverpool come from 3–1 down to a final score of 5–3, with the side finally emerging victorious in the tournament, and scoring in the 2005–06 Champions League 2–1 away defeat of Real Betis, with a chip from 20 yards.

In late January 2006, Sinama Pongolle was loaned to fellow Premier League side Blackburn Rovers until the end of the season. He scored once for them, a 2–3 defeat at Tottenham Hotspur.

=== Spain ===
On 30 August 2006, Sinama Pongolle signed a one-year contract at Recreativo, with an option to sign on for a further two years. On 4 May 2007, the Andalusians confirmed he had agreed to a deal until 2011, for a fee of €4 million. He was Recre's top goalscorer in his two La Liga seasons with the team, at 12 and ten respectively.

Sinama Pongolle joined Atlético Madrid on 3 July 2008, for a fee believed to be in the region of £8 million. Initially thought of as a backup to Diego Forlán and Sergio Agüero, he benefitted from an injury to the Uruguayan, scoring four goals in his first five league appearances for the Colchoneros, with braces against former club Recreativo and Getafe; later in his debut campaign, injury and match bans to Maxi Rodríguez saw him playing several games as right winger, as the team once again finished fourth.

=== Sporting CP and Rostov ===
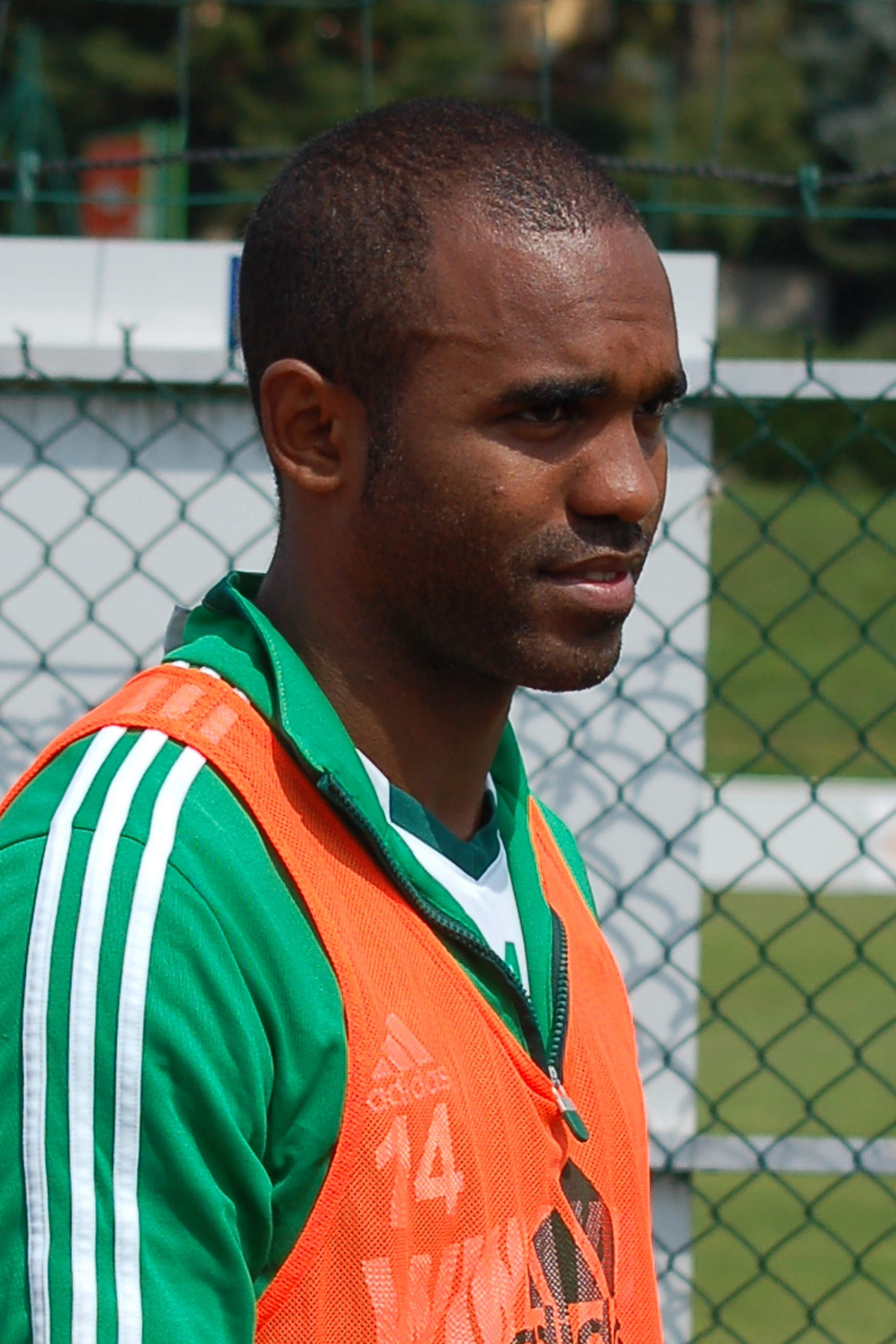
Sinama Pongolle with Saint-Étienne in 2011

In the winter transfer market opening in 2010, Sinama Pongolle was transferred to Sporting CP for €6.5 million, with the fee possibly raising to €7.5. On 26 March 2010, he scored his first goal for the Lions, but also conceded an own goal in a 3–2 loss at Marítimo.

Sinama Pongolle spent the following two seasons on loan, with Zaragoza and Saint-Étienne, the latter in his homeland. On 30 August 2012 he terminated his contract with Sporting, going on to spend two years in the Russian Premier League with Rostov where he featured rarely.

=== Later years ===
On 9 September 2014, Sinama Pongolle signed with Major League Soccer's Chicago Fire. In November of the following year, after a short spell in Switzerland with Lausanne-Sport, he joined Dundee United.

In July 2016, Sinama Pongolle joined Chainat Hornbill of the Thai League 1, scoring once in his debut but in a 2–7 away defeat against Chonburi. In early November, in spite of the team's relegation, the 32-year-old extended his contract until 2018.

Sinama Pongolle returned to the island of his birth in January 2019, rejoining Saint-Pierroise with Uruguayan strike partner Diego Silva also making the same move from Thailand. Though he retired partway through the campaign, he contributed to them becoming the first Outre-Mer club since 1989 to reach the last 32 of the Coupe de France, scoring a hat-trick in the fourth round 9–1 win over ES Étang-Salé.

== International career ==
After his under-16 and under-17 exploits, Sinama Pongolle made his France under-21 debut on 21 August 2002. He was a part of the squad that participated in the 2006 UEFA European Championship which took place in Portugal and, at the end of his four-year tenure with this category, ranked first in caps (37) and goals (11).

Sinama Pongolle played his only game with the senior side on 14 October 2008, during a 3–1 friendly win against Tunisia.

== Career statistics ==
=== Club ===
Appearances and goals by club, season and competition
| Club | Season | League | | | National Cup | | League Cup | | Continental | | Other | | Total | | Ref. |
| Club | Season | Division | Apps | Goals | Apps | Goals | Apps | Goals | Apps | Goals | Apps | Goals | Apps | Goals | Ref. |
|---|---|---|---|---|---|---|---|---|---|---|---|---|---|---|---|
| Le Havre (loan) | 2001–02 | Division 2 | 11 | 2 | 1 | 0 | 1 | 1 | – | | – | | 13 | 3 | |
| Le Havre (loan) | 2002–03 | Ligue 1 | 31 | 5 | 2 | 1 | 0 | 0 | – | | – | | 33 | 6 | |
| Le Havre (loan) | Total | | 42 | 7 | 3 | 1 | 1 | 1 | 0 | 0 | 0 | 0 | 46 | 9 | – |
| Liverpool | 2003–04 | Premier League | 15 | 2 | 3 | 0 | 2 | 0 | 3 | 0 | – | | 23 | 2 | |
| Liverpool | 2004–05 | Premier League | 16 | 2 | 1 | 0 | 5 | 1 | 4 | 1 | – | | 26 | 4 | |
| Liverpool | 2005–06 | Premier League | 7 | 0 | 1 | 2 | 1 | 0 | 3 | 1 | 3 | 0 | 15 | 3 | |
| Liverpool | 2006–07 | Premier League | 0 | 0 | 0 | 0 | 0 | 0 | 0 | 0 | 1 | 0 | 1 | 0 | |
| Liverpool | Total | | 38 | 4 | 5 | 2 | 8 | 1 | 10 | 2 | 4 | 0 | 65 | 9 | – |
| Blackburn Rovers (loan) | 2005–06 | Premier League | 10 | 1 | 0 | 0 | 0 | 0 | 0 | 0 | – | | 10 | 1 | |
| Recreativo | 2006–07 | La Liga | 34 | 12 | 1 | 0 | – | | – | | – | | 35 | 12 | |
| Recreativo | 2007–08 | La Liga | 34 | 10 | 3 | 0 | – | | – | | – | | 37 | 10 | |
| Recreativo | Total | | 68 | 22 | 4 | 0 | 0 | 0 | 0 | 0 | 0 | 0 | 72 | 22 | – |
| Atlético Madrid | 2008–09 | La Liga | 30 | 5 | 4 | 1 | – | | 9 | 0 | – | | 43 | 6 | |
| Atlético Madrid | 2009–10 | La Liga | 10 | 0 | 2 | 1 | – | | 3 | 0 | – | | 15 | 1 | |
| Atlético Madrid | Total | | 40 | 5 | 6 | 2 | 0 | 0 | 12 | 0 | 0 | 0 | 58 | 7 | – |
| Sporting CP | 2009–10 | Primeira Liga | 5 | 1 | 0 | 0 | 1 | 0 | 1 | 0 | – | | 7 | 1 | |
| Zaragoza (loan) | 2010–11 | La Liga | 24 | 4 | 0 | 0 | – | | – | | – | | 24 | 4 | |
| Saint-Étienne (loan) | 2011–12 | Ligue 1 | 23 | 4 | 1 | 0 | 1 | 0 | – | | – | | 25 | 4 | |
| Rostov | 2012–13 | Russian Premier League | 10 | 1 | 1 | 0 | – | | – | | – | | 11 | 1 | |
| Rostov | 2013–14 | Russian Premier League | 8 | 1 | 3 | 0 | – | | – | | – | | 11 | 1 | |
| Rostov | Total | | 18 | 2 | 4 | 0 | 0 | 0 | 0 | 0 | 0 | 0 | 22 | 2 | – |
| Chicago Fire | 2014 | Major League Soccer | 7 | 1 | 0 | 0 | 0 | 0 | – | | – | | 7 | 1 | |
| Dundee United | 2015–16 | Scottish Premier League | 4 | 0 | 0 | 0 | 0 | 0 | – | | – | | 4 | 0 | |
| Chainat Hornbill | 2016 | Thai League 1 | 10 | 13 | 0 | 0 | 0 | 0 | – | | – | | 10 | 13 | |
| Chainat Hornbill | 2017 | Thai League 2 | 26 | 14 | 0 | 0 | 0 | 0 | – | | – | | 26 | 14 | |
| Chainat Hornbill | 2018 | Thai League 1 | 26 | 6 | 0 | 0 | 0 | 0 | – | | – | | 26 | 6 | |
| Chainat Hornbill | Total | | 62 | 33 | 0 | 0 | 0 | 0 | 0 | 0 | 0 | 0 | 62 | 33 | – |
| Career total | | | 341 | 84 | 23 | 5 | 11 | 2 | 23 | 2 | 4 | 0 | 402 | 93 | – |

=== International ===
Appearances and goals by national team and year
| National team | Year | Apps | Goals |
|---|---|---|---|
| France | 2008 | 1 | 0 |
| Total | | 1 | 0 |

== Honours ==
Liverpool

- UEFA Champions League: 2004–05
- UEFA Super Cup: 2005
- FIFA Club World Championship runner-up: 2005
- FA Community Shield: 2006

Rostov

- Russian Cup: 2013–14

Chainat Hornbill

- Thai League 2: 2017

Saint-Pierroise

- Réunion Premier League: 2019

France U17

- FIFA U-17 World Championship: 2001

Individual

- FIFA U-17 World Championship Golden Ball: 2001
- FIFA U-17 World Championship Golden Shoe: 2001
