= Dzmitry Kalachow =

Belarusian footballer

Personal information
- Full name: Dzmitry Syarheevich Kalachow
- Date of birth: 16 June 1978 (age 48)
- Height: 1.75 m (5 ft 9 in)
- Position: Midfielder

Youth career
- 1994–1995: RUOR Minsk

Senior career*
| Years | Team | Apps | (Gls) |
| 1995 | MPKC-2 Minsk | 7 | (1) |
| 1995–2003 | Dnepr-Transmash Mogilev | 188 | (14) |
| 1995–1997 | → Dnepr-2 Mogilev | 11 | (1) |
| 2003–2004 | Dinamo Minsk | 19 | (0) |
| 2004 | Shakhtyor Soligorsk | 8 | (1) |
| 2005–2006 | Dinamo Brest | 47 | (2) |
| 2007 | Darida Minsk Raion | 10 | (0) |
| 2007–2010 | Dnepr Mogilev | 76 | (2) |
| 2010 | → Belshina Bobruisk (loan) | 6 | (0) |
| 2011 | Slutsk | 27 | (3) |
| 2012 | Dnepr-2 Mogilev | 12 | (0) |
| 2013 | Gorki | | |

International career
| 1998–1999 | Belarus U21 | 2 | (0) |
- * Club domestic league appearances and goals as of 27 December 2013

Dzmitry Kalachow (Belarusian: Дзмітрый Калачоў; Russian: Дмитрий Калачёв; born 16 June 1978) is a retired Belarusian professional footballer.

He is the older brother of the Belarusian international Timofei Kalachev.

== Honours ==
Dnepr-Transmash Mogilev

- Belarusian Premier League champion: 1998

Dinamo Minsk

- Belarusian Premier League champion: 2004

Dinamo Brest

- Belarusian Cup winner: 2006–07
