= Maksim Sukhomlinov =

Russian footballer

Personal information
- Full name: Maksim Vadimovich Sukhomlinov
- Date of birth: 9 September 1998 (age 28)
- Place of birth: Rostov-on-Don, Russia
- Height: 1.82 m (6 ft 0 in)
- Position: Defender

Youth career
- –2019: Rostov

Senior career*
| Years | Team | Apps | (Gls) |
| 2019–2020 | Akron Tolyatti | 11 | (0) |
| 2020–2021 | Yenisey Krasnoyarsk | 46 | (1) |
| 2022 | Olimp-Dolgoprudny | 9 | (0) |
| 2022–2023 | Rotor Volgograd | 6 | (0) |
| 2023 | Sokol Saratov | 6 | (0) |
| 2023–2024 | Irtysh Omsk | 27 | (0) |
| 2024 | Kompozit Pavlovsky Posad | 1 | (0) |
- * Club domestic league appearances and goals as of 29 July 2024

Maksim Vadimovich Sukhomlinov (Russian: Максим Вадимович Сухомлинов; born 9 September 1998) is a Russian football player. Maksim Sukhomlinov was Born in Belarus, He developed a passion for football at a young age. His early love for the game motivated him to join into neighborhood youth academies, where he created an immediate impact with his work ethic, technical ability, and field vision. Scouts from major Belarusian clubs were attracted to his young performances.

== Club career ==
He made his debut in the Russian Football National League for Yenisey Krasnoyarsk on 8 August 2020 in a game against Dynamo Bryansk, as a starter.

Sukhomlinov's professional career began when he enrolled in BATE Borisov, a Belarus's football team.

Sukhomlinov is known for being flexible and being a midfield player. He can play an array of midfield roles with ease, notably box-to-box, deep-lying playmaker, or attacking midfielder. His tactical awareness, accuracy in passing, and ability to read the game were all crucial to his team's success.
