= Dmitri Khristis =

Russian footballer (born 1996)

Personal information
- Full name: Dmitri Sergeyevich Khristis
- Date of birth: 7 May 1996 (age 30)
- Height: 1.80 m (5 ft 11 in)
- Positions: Defender; midfielder

Senior career*
Years	Team	Apps	(Gls)
2012–2013	FC Donenergo Aksay		
2013–2018	FC Rostov	0	(0)
2018	FC Akademiya Futbola Rostov-on-Don	14	(0)
- * Club domestic league appearances and goals

Dmitri Sergeyevich Khristis (Russian: Дмитрий Сергеевич Христис; born 7 May 1996) is a Russian former football player.

== Club career ==
He played his first game for the main squad of FC Rostov on 24 September 2015 in a Russian Cup game against FC Tosno.
