= Aleksandr Logunov (footballer) =

Russian footballer

Personal information
- Full name: Aleksandr Igorevich Logunov
- Date of birth: 22 June 1996 (age 30)
- Place of birth: Dimitrovgrad, Russia
- Height: 1.89 m (6 ft 2 in)
- Position: Defender

Youth career
- 2012: Akademiya Tolyatti
- 2013–2014: Rostov
- 2014–2015: Lokomotiv Moscow
- 2016: Rostov

Senior career*
Years	Team	Apps	(Gls)
2013	FC Dimitrovgrad		
2014–2015	Lokomotiv Moscow	0	(0)
2015	→ Baltika Kaliningrad (loan)	1	(0)
2016–2017	Avangard Kursk	23	(0)
2018	Lada Togliatti	6	(0)
2018	Luch Minsk	0	(0)
2019	Lada Dimitrovgrad	12	(0)
2020	Mashuk-KMV Pyatigorsk	3	(0)
2020–2021	Zenit-Izhevsk	19	(1)
2021	Tuapse	7	(2)
- * Club domestic league appearances and goals

Aleksandr Igorevich Logunov (Russian: Александр Игоревич Логунов; born 22 June 1996) is a Russian former football player.

== Club career ==
He made his debut in the Russian Football National League for FC Baltika Kaliningrad on 25 October 2015 in a game against FC Tom Tomsk.
