= Denis Mashkin =

Russian footballer

Personal information
- Full name: Denis Maksimovich Mashkin
- Date of birth: 16 July 1996 (age 30)
- Height: 1.83 m (6 ft 0 in)
- Position: Midfielder

Senior career*
Years	Team	Apps	(Gls)
2014–2016	FC Rostov	0	(0)
2016	FC Titan Klin (amateur)		
- * Club domestic league appearances and goals

Denis Maksimovich Mashkin (Russian: Денис Максимович Машкин; born 16 July 1996) is a former Russian football player.

== Club career ==
He played his first game for the main squad of FC Rostov on 24 September 2015 in a Russian Cup game against FC Tosno.
