= Sergei Zabrodin =

Russian footballer (born 1998)

Personal information
- Full name: Sergei Andreyevich Zabrodin
- Date of birth: 25 February 1998 (age 28)
- Place of birth: Rostov-on-Don, Russia
- Height: 1.69 m (5 ft 7 in)
- Position: Midfielder

Senior career*
Years	Team	Apps	(Gls)
2015	SKA Rostov-2		
2015–2019	FC Rostov	0	(0)
2018–2019	→ SKA Rostov (loan)	17	(0)
2019	Ararat Moscow	15	(0)
2020	Inter Cherkessk	2	(0)
2020	Kolomna	12	(0)
2021	Yessentuki	32	(0)
- * Club domestic league appearances and goals

Sergei Andreyevich Zabrodin (Russian: Сергей Андреевич Забродин; born 25 February 1998) is a Russian former football player who played as a midfielder.

== Club career ==
He played his first game for the main squad of FC Rostov on 24 September 2015 in a Russian Cup game against FC Tosno.
