= Artyom Sobol =

Russian footballer

Personal information
- Full name: Artyom Sergeyevich Sobol
- Date of birth: 4 July 1996 (age 30)
- Place of birth: Novobataysk, Russia
- Height: 1.69 m (5 ft 7 in)
- Positions: Defender; midfielder

Senior career*
Years	Team	Apps	(Gls)
2012–2015	FC Donenergo Aksay		
2015	FC SKA Rostov-on-Don	16	(0)
2016–2017	FC Rostov	0	(0)
2017–2018	FC Armavir	40	(0)
2019	FC Chayka Peschanokopskoye	1	(0)
2020	FC SKA Rostov-on-Don	1	(0)
2020–2021	FC Tver	14	(1)
2021	FC Biolog-Novokubansk	4	(0)
- * Club domestic league appearances and goals

Artyom Sergeyevich Sobol (Russian: Артём Сергеевич Соболь; born 4 July 1996) is a Russian former football player.

== Club career ==
He made his debut in the Russian Professional Football League for FC SKA Rostov-on-Don on 19 July 2015 in a game against FC Astrakhan.

He made his Russian Football National League debut for FC Armavir on 22 July 2018 in a game against FC Mordovia Saransk.
