= Dzhambulat Dulayev =

Russian footballer (born 1998)

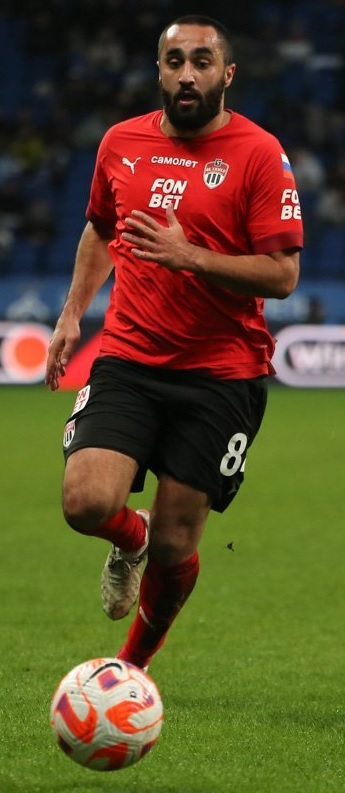
- Dulayev with Khimki in 2022

Personal information
- Full name: Dzhambulat Olegovich Dulayev
- Date of birth: 18 October 1998 (age 28)
- Height: 1.79 m (5 ft 10 in)
- Position: Forward

Youth career
- Spartak Vladikavkaz
- 2016–2018: Rostov

Senior career*
Years	Team	Apps	(Gls)
2014–2015	Alania Vladikavkaz	6	(0)
2019	Olimp-2 Khimki	4	(0)
2019–2020	Olimp Khimki	15	(1)
2020–2022	Mashuk-KMV Pyatigorsk	42	(21)
2022	Olimp-Dolgoprudny	5	(0)
2022–2023	Khimki-M	25	(11)
2022–2023	Khimki	3	(0)
- * Club domestic league appearances and goals as of 10 June 2023

Dzhambulat Olegovich Dulayev (Russian: Джамбулат Олегович Дулаев; born 18 October 1998) is a Russian footballer who plays as a forward.

== Career ==
Dulayev made his debut in the Russian Premier League for FC Khimki on 29 October 2022 in a game against Dynamo Moscow. Khimki scored their only goal in a 6–1 loss from a penalty kick awarded for a foul against Dulayev.

== Career statistics ==
As of 27 November 2022

Club	Season	League			Cup		Continental		Total	
Club	Season	Division	Apps	Goals	Apps	Goals	Apps	Goals	Apps	Goals
Alania Vladikavkaz	2014–15	Second League	6	0	1	0	–		7	0
Olimp Khimki	2019–20	Second League	15	1	1	1	–		16	2
Mashuk-KMV Pyatigorsk	2020–21	Second League	26	8	3	1	–		29	9
Mashuk-KMV Pyatigorsk	2021–22	Second League	16	13	2	1	–		18	14
Mashuk-KMV Pyatigorsk	Total		42	21	5	2	0	0	47	23
Olimp-Dolgoprudny	2021–22	First League	5	0	–		–		5	0
Khimki-M	2022–23	Second League	16	9	–		–		16	9
Khimki	2022–23	RPL	2	0	1	0	–		3	0
Career total			86	31	8	3	0	0	94	34
