= Danila Khakhalev =

Russian footballer (born 1997)

Personal information
- Full name: Danila Alekseyevich Khakhalev
- Date of birth: 23 January 1997 (age 29)
- Place of birth: Volgograd, Russia
- Height: 1.78 m (5 ft 10 in)
- Positions: Midfielder; forward

Youth career
- FC Olimpia Volgograd

Senior career*
Years	Team	Apps	(Gls)
2015–2016	FC Rostov	0	(0)
2017–2018	FC Rotor Volgograd	4	(0)
2018–2019	FC Rotor-2 Volgograd	21	(1)
2019	FC Kaluga	5	(0)
- * Club domestic league appearances and goals

Danila Alekseyevich Khakhalev (Russian: Данила Алексеевич Хахалев; born 23 January 1997) is a Russian former football player.

== Club career ==
He made his debut for the main squad of FC Rostov on 24 September 2015 in a Russian Cup game against FC Tosno.

He made his debut in the Russian Professional Football League for FC Rotor Volgograd on 21 May 2017 in a game against FC Legion-Dynamo Makhachkala.
