= Sergey Belousov =

Russian association football midfielder

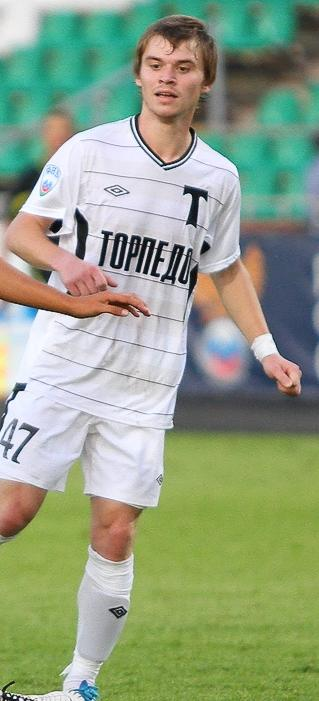

Personal information
- Full name: Sergey Aleksandrovich Belousov
- Date of birth: 4 May 1990 (age 36)
- Place of birth: Yelets, Russian SFSR
- Height: 1.72 m (5 ft 8 in)
- Position: Midfielder

Team information
- Current team: FC Yelets

Youth career
- FC Yelets

Senior career*
Years	Team	Apps	(Gls)
2007–2010	FC Saturn Ramenskoye	0	(0)
2009–2010	→ FC Zhemchuzhina-Sochi (loan)	34	(8)
2011	FC Zhemchuzhina-Sochi	11	(0)
2011–2012	FC Torpedo Moscow	27	(4)
2012–2015	FC Rostov	2	(0)
2013–2014	→ FC Shinnik Yaroslavl (loan)	38	(2)
2014–2015	→ FC Sokol Saratov (loan)	14	(0)
2015–2020	FC Metallurg Lipetsk	93	(9)
2020–	FC Yelets (amateur)		

International career^{‡}
2008	Russia U-18	9	(2)
2009	Russia U-19	7	(1)
2012	Russia-2	2	(0)
- * Club domestic league appearances and goals as of 9 November 2019 ‡ National team caps and goals as of 9 September 2012

Sergey Aleksandrovich Belousov (Russian: Сергей Александрович Белоусов; born 4 May 1990) is a Russian association football midfielder. He plays for FC Yelets.

== Career ==
Belousov made his professional debut for Saturn on 15 July 2009 in the Russian Cup game against FC Luch-Energiya Vladivostok. In the 2009 summer transfer window, he moved to Russian Second Division's Zhemchuzhina-Sochi on loan until the end of the season.

A product of FC Yelets's youth football system, Belousov has played in the Russian Premier League with FC Saturn and FC Rostov.
