= Andrei Demchenko (footballer, born 1993) =

Russian football player

Personal information
- Full name: Andrei Sergeyevich Demchenko
- Date of birth: 1 July 1993 (age 33)
- Place of birth: Rostov-on-Don, Russia
- Height: 1.80 m (5 ft 11 in)
- Position: Left back

Youth career
- –2015: Rostov

Senior career*
Years	Team	Apps	(Gls)
2014	Rostov	0	(0)
2015	Solyaris Moscow	0	(0)
2016	Chayka-2 Peschanokopskoye		
2016–2018	Afips Afipsky	61	(4)
2018–2019	Chayka Peschanokopskoye	41	(3)
2020	SKA Rostov-on-Don	15	(1)
2021	Ryazan	14	(0)
2021–2022	Sokol Saratov	30	(9)
2022	Irtysh Omsk	1	(0)
2023–2024	Salyut Belgorod	31	(1)
2024	Forte Taganrog	1	(0)
- * Club domestic league appearances and goals as of 16 November 2024

Andrei Sergeyevich Demchenko (Russian: Андрей Сергеевич Демченко; born 1 July 1993) is a Russian football player.

== Club career ==
He made his debut in the Russian Professional Football League for Afips Afipsky on 28 July 2016 in a game against Angusht Nazran.

He made his Russian Football National League debut for Chayka Peschanokopskoye on 7 July 2019 in a game against Chertanovo Moscow.
