= Ruslan Shapovalov =

Russian footballer

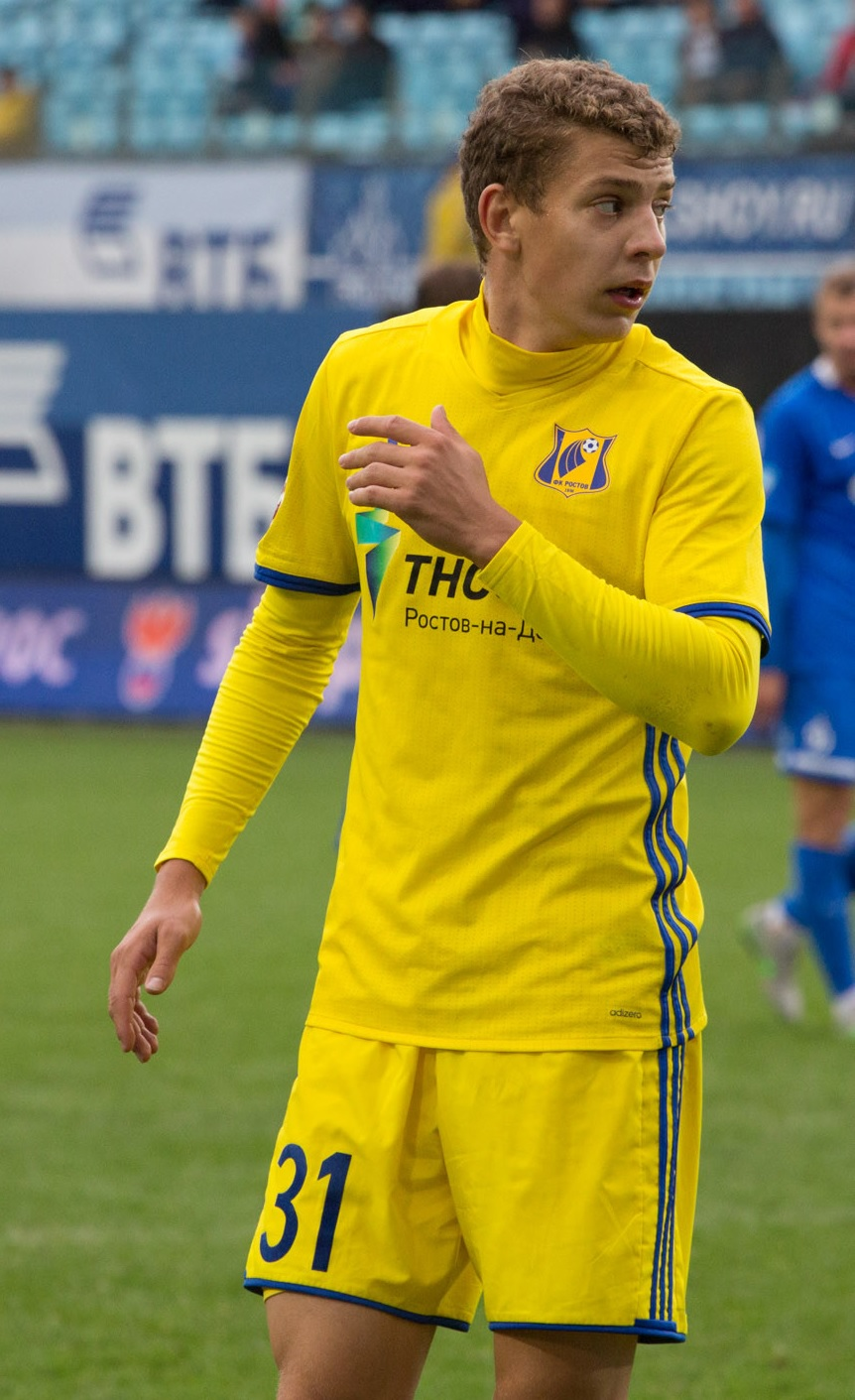
- Shapovalov with Rostov in 2016

Personal information
- Full name: Ruslan Borisovich Shapovalov
- Date of birth: 9 August 1995 (age 31)
- Height: 1.77 m (5 ft 10 in)
- Position: Midfielder

Senior career*
Years	Team	Apps	(Gls)
2012	RO UOR Rostov-on-Don		
2013–2016	FC Rostov	0	(0)
2017–2021	FC SKA Rostov-on-Don	104	(14)
2021–2022	FC Metallurg Lipetsk	27	(1)
2022–2023	FC Kuban-Holding Pavlovskaya	15	(0)
- * Club domestic league appearances and goals

Ruslan Borisovich Shapovalov (Russian: Руслан Борисович Шаповалов; born 9 August 1995) is a Russian former football player.

== Club career ==
He played his first game for the main squad of FC Rostov on 24 September 2015 in a Russian Cup game against FC Tosno.
