= Daniil Ostapenko =

Russian footballer (born 1995)

Personal information
- Full name: Daniil Sergeyevich Ostapenko
- Date of birth: 8 June 1995 (age 31)
- Place of birth: Volgograd, Russia
- Height: 1.74 m (5 ft 9 in)
- Positions: Midfielder; forward

Senior career*
Years	Team	Apps	(Gls)
2011	FC Olimpia Volgograd (amateur)		
2012–2016	FC Rostov	0	(0)
2016	FC Zenit Penza	4	(0)
2017	FC Mashuk-KMV Pyatigorsk	8	(0)
2017	FC Znamya Truda Orekhovo-Zuyevo	9	(0)
2018	FC Mashuk-KMV Pyatigorsk	13	(0)
2018	FC Inkomsport Yalta	17	(3)
2019–2020	FC Rubin Yalta	11	(3)
- * Club domestic league appearances and goals

Daniil Sergeyevich Ostapenko (Russian: Даниил Сергеевич Остапенко; born 8 June 1995) is a Russian former football player.

== Club career ==
He played his first game for the main squad of FC Rostov on 24 September 2015 in a Russian Cup game against FC Tosno.
