= Anton Lazutkin =

Russian footballer

Personal information
- Full name: Anton Nikolayevich Lazutkin
- Date of birth: 5 November 1994 (age 31)
- Place of birth: Rostov-on-Don, Russia
- Height: 1.77 m (5 ft 10 in)
- Position: Defender

Youth career
- 2006–2008: Konoplyov football academy

Senior career*
Years	Team	Apps	(Gls)
2011–2012	FC Rostov-M Rostov-on-Don		
2012–2017	FC Rostov	0	(0)
- * Club domestic league appearances and goals

Anton Nikolayevich Lazutkin (Russian: Антон Николаевич Лазуткин; born 5 November 1994) is a Russian former football player.

== Club career ==
He played his first game for the main squad of FC Rostov on 24 September 2015 in a Russian Cup game against FC Tosno.
