= Timofey Kalachyov =

Belarusian footballer

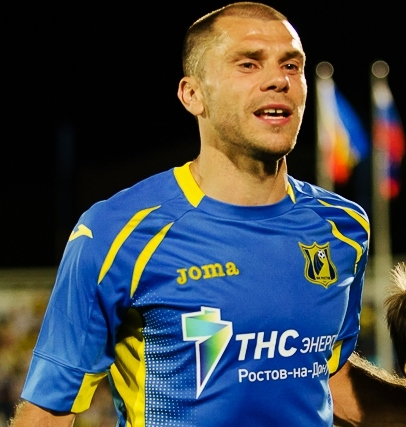
- Kalachyov with FC Rostov (2015)

Personal information
- Full name: Timofey Sergeyevich Kalachyov
- Date of birth: 1 May 1981 (age 45)
- Place of birth: Mogilev, Belarusian SSR, Soviet Union
- Height: 1.72 m (5 ft 8 in)
- Position: Midfielder

Team information
- Current team: Chayka Peschanokopskoye (assistant coach)

Youth career
- 1998–2000: Dnepr-Transmash Mogilev

Senior career*
Years	Team	Apps	(Gls)
1998–2002	Dnepr-Transmash Mogilev	74	(11)
1998	→ Dnepr-2 Mogilev	18	(1)
1999	→ Veino-Dnepr	22	(4)
2000	→ Dnepr-2 Mogilev	4	(1)
2003	Shakhtyor Soligorsk	30	(5)
2004	Shakhtar Donetsk	2	(0)
2004	→ Illichivets Mariupol (loan)	3	(0)
2004	→ Shakhtar-2 Donetsk	5	(1)
2005	Khimki	28	(3)
2006–2007	Rostov	55	(4)
2008–2009	Krylia Sovetov Samara	32	(6)
2010–2019	Rostov	204	(20)
Total		477	(56)

International career
2001–2004	Belarus U21	24	(3)
2004–2016	Belarus	76	(10)

Managerial career
- 2021–: Chayka Peschanokopskoye (assistant)
- * Club domestic league appearances and goals

Timofey Sergeyevich Kalachyov (Belarusian: Цімафей Сяргеевіч Калачоў; Russian: Тимофей Сергеевич Калачёв; born 1 May 1981) is a Belarusian professional football coach and a former player who played for the Belarus national team for nearly a dozen years. He is an assistant coach with Russian club Chayka Peschanokopskoye. He played right winger or right midfielder.

== Club career ==
Kalachyov signed a five-year contract with Ukrainian side Shakhtar Donetsk from Belarusian Shakhtyor Soligorsk in January 2004.

He signed a three-year contract with Krylia Sovetov Samara in January 2008. In 2010, Kalachyov signed with another Russian Premier League club, Rostov.

On 16 May 2019, Rostov announced that the game against Zenit Saint Petersburg on 19 May would be his farewell game as a Rostov player after 11 seasons spent at the club. He confirmed his retirement after that game.

== International career ==
Kalachyov captained the Belarus national team between March 2014 and March 2015.

== Personal life ==
Kalachyov's older brother Dzmitry Kalachow is also a professional footballer. His father was Belarusian, while his mother is of Russian descent.

== Career statistics ==
=== Club ===
Appearances and goals by club, season and competition
Club	Season	League			Cup		Continental		Other		Total	
Club	Season	Division	Apps	Goals	Apps	Goals	Apps	Goals	Apps	Goals	Apps	Goals
Dnepr-2 Mogilev	1998	Belarusian Second League	18	1	0	0	–		–		18	1
Veino-Dnepr	1999	Belarusian First League	22	4	0	0	–		–		22	4
Dnepr-2 Mogilev	2000	Amateur	4	1	0	0	–		–		4	1
Dnepr-Transmash Mahilyow	2000	Belarusian Premier League	27	7	0	0	4	1	–		31	8
Dnepr-Transmash Mahilyow	2001	Belarusian Premier League	22	1	0	0	–		–		22	1
Dnepr-Transmash Mahilyow	2002	Belarusian Premier League	25	3	0	0	–		–		25	3
Dnepr-Transmash Mahilyow	Total		74	11	0	0	4	1	0	0	78	12
Shakhtyor Soligorsk	2003	Belarusian Premier League	30	5	0	0	4	2	–		34	7
Shakhtar Donetsk	2003–04	Ukrainian Premier League	2	0	1	0	0	0	–		3	0
Shakhtar Donetsk	2004–05	Ukrainian Premier League	0	0	0	0	0	0	–		0	0
Shakhtar Donetsk	Total		2	0	1	0	0	0	0	0	3	0
Illychivets Mariupol (loan)	2003–04	Ukrainian Premier League	3	0	0	0	–		–		3	0
Shakhtar-2 Donetsk	2004–05	Ukrainian First League	5	1	–		–		–		5	1
Khinki	2005	FNL	28	3	7	0	–		–		35	3
Rostov	2006	Russian Premier League	28	2	0	0	–		–		28	2
Rostov	2007	Russian Premier League	27	2	5	0	–		–		32	2
Rostov	Total		55	4	5	0	0	0	0	0	60	4
Krylia Sovetov	2008	Russian Premier League	6	1	0	0	–		–		6	1
Krylia Sovetov	2009	Russian Premier League	26	5	0	0	2	0	–		28	5
Krylia Sovetov	Total		32	6	0	0	2	0	0	0	34	6
Rostov	2010	Russian Premier League	17	2	1	0	–		–		18	2
Rostov	2011–12	Russian Premier League	31	4	4	0	–		–		35	4
Rostov	2012–13	Russian Premier League	21	3	3	0	–		1 (Note: One appearance in relegation play-offs)	0	25	3
Rostov	2013–14	Russian Premier League	26	6	3	0	–		–		29	6
Rostov	2014–15	Russian Premier League	25	1	0	0	2	0	3 (Note: One appearance in the Russian Super Cup, two appearances in relegation play-offs)	0	30	1
Rostov	2015–16	Russian Premier League	22	0	0	0	–		–		22	0
Rostov	2016–17	Russian Premier League	25	0	0	0	12	0	–		37	0
Rostov	2017–18	Russian Premier League	25	4	0	0	–		–		25	4
Rostov	Total		192	20	11	0	14	0	4	0	221	20
Career total			465	56	24	0	24	3	4	0	517	59

=== International ===
Appearances and goals by national team and year
National team	Year	Apps	Goals
Belarus	2004	1	0
Belarus	2005	8	0
Belarus	2006	10	1
Belarus	2007	10	1
Belarus	2008	1	0
Belarus	2009	10	5
Belarus	2010	4	0
Belarus	2011	9	0
Belarus	2012	0	0
Belarus	2013	8	1
Belarus	2014	7	1
Belarus	2015	3	1
Belarus	2016	5	0
Total		76	10

Scores and results list Belarus' goal tally first, score column indicates score after each Kalachyov goal.

List of international goals scored by Timofey Kalachyov
No.	Date	Venue	Opponent	Score	Result	Competition
1	2 September 2006	Dinamo Stadium, Minsk, Belarus	Albania	1–0	2–2	UEFA Euro 2008 qualification
2	24 March 2007	Stade Josy Barthel, Luxembourg City, Luxembourg	Luxembourg	1–0	2–1	UEFA Euro 2008 qualification
3	1 April 2009	Almaty Central Stadium, Almaty, Kazakhstan	Kazakhstan	2–1	5–1	FIFA World Cup 2010 qualification
4	1 April 2009	Almaty Central Stadium, Almaty, Kazakhstan	Kazakhstan	4–1	5–1	FIFA World Cup 2010 qualification
5	6 June 2009	Neman Stadium, Grodno, Belarus	Andorra	2–0	5–1	FIFA World Cup 2010 qualification
6	10 October 2009	Regional Sport Complex Brestskiy, Brest, Belarus	Kazakhstan	2–0	4–0	FIFA World Cup 2010 qualification
7	10 October 2009	Regional Sport Complex Brestskiy, Brest, Belarus	Kazakhstan	4–0	4–0	FIFA World Cup 2010 qualification
8	10 September 2013	Central Stadium, Gomel, Belarus	France	2–1	2–4	FIFA World Cup 2014 qualification
9	12 October 2014	Borisov Arena, Barysaw, Belarus	Slovakia	1–1	1–3	UEFA Euro 2016 qualifying
10	27 March 2015	Philip II Arena, Skopje, Macedonia	Macedonia	1–1	2–1	UEFA Euro 2016 qualifying

== Honours ==
Rostov

- Russian Cup: 2013–14

Khimki

- Russian Cup runner-up: 2004–05

Individual

- Belarusian Footballer of the Year: 2013, 2016
