= Andrei Sidenko =

Russian footballer

Personal information
- Full name: Andrei Vladimirovich Sidenko
- Date of birth: 30 August 1995 (age 31)
- Place of birth: Rostov-on-Don, Russia
- Height: 1.77 m (5 ft 10 in)
- Position: Midfielder

Youth career
- 2012–2017: Rostov

Senior career*
Years	Team	Apps	(Gls)
2015–2017	Rostov	0	(0)
2018	Rubin Yalta	13	(0)
2018	Dynamo Stavropol	13	(0)
2019	Orsha	6	(0)
2019	Veles Moscow	10	(1)
2020–2021	Yevpatoriya	41	(10)
2021–2022	TSK Simferopol	15	(1)
2023	Rubin Yalta	10	(1)
- * Club domestic league appearances and goals

Andrei Vladimirovich Sidenko (Russian: Андрей Владимирович Сиденко; born 30 August 1995) is a Russian former football player.

== Club career ==
He played his first game for the main squad of FC Rostov on 24 September 2015 in a Russian Cup game against FC Tosno.
