= 2018–19 FC Rostov season =

FC Rostov
2018–19 season
- Chairman: Viktor Goncharov
- Manager: Valeri Karpin
- Stadium: Rostov Arena; Olimp – 2
- Russian Premier League: 9th
- Russian Cup: Semifinal vs Lokomotiv Moscow
- Top goalscorer: League: Aleksei Ionov (6); All: Aleksei Ionov (6)
Home colours	Away colours	Third colours

The 2018–19 FC Rostov season was the club's tenth successive season in the Russian Premier League, the highest tier of football in Russia. They finished the season 9th in the Premier League, and reached the Semifinal of the Russian Cup, where they lost to eventual winners Lokomotiv Moscow.

== Squad ==
As of match played 26 May 2019

No.	Name	Nationality	Position	Date of birth (age)	Signed from	Signed in	Contract ends	Apps.	Goals
Goalkeepers
30	Sergei Pesyakov	(Russia)	GK	16 December 1988 (aged 30)	Spartak Moscow	2017		47	0
31	Ilya Abayev	(Russia)	GK	2 August 1981 (aged 37)	Lokomotiv Moscow	2017		24	0
Defenders
3	Maciej Wilusz	(Poland)	DF	25 September 1988 (aged 30)	Lech Poznań	2017		44	1
4	Sergei Parshivlyuk	(Russia)	DF	18 March 1989 (aged 30)	Anzhi Makhachkala	2017		57	3
5	Dennis Hadžikadunić	(Sweden)	DF	9 July 1998 (aged 20)	Malmö FF	2018		12	1
6	Ragnar Sigurðsson	(Iceland)	DF	19 June 1986 (aged 32)	Fulham	2018		40	0
24	Miha Mevlja	(Slovenia)	DF	12 June 1990 (aged 28)	loan from Zenit St.Petersburg	2019	2019	48	1
25	Arseny Logashov	(Russia)	DF	18 March 1989 (aged 30)	Baltika Kaliningrad	2018		43	2
28	Yevgeni Chernov	(Russia)	DF	23 October 1992 (aged 26)	Zenit St.Petersburg	2019	2022	15	0
33	Konstantin Pliyev	(Russia)	DF	26 October 1996 (aged 22)	Volgar Astrakhan	2018		6	0
80	Ivan Novoseltsev	(Russia)	DF	25 August 1991 (aged 27)	loan from Zenit St.Petersburg	2019	2019	62	2
81	Mikhail Osinov	(Russia)	DF	29 December 2000 (aged 18)	Academy	2017		1	0
92	Artyom Shchadin	(Russia)	DF	1 November 1992 (aged 26)	Kuban Krasnodar	2018		8	0
Midfielders
2	Timofei Kalachev	(Belarus)	MF	1 May 1981 (aged 38)	Krylia Sovetov	2010		295	24
7	Roman Eremenko	(Finland)	MF	19 March 1987 (aged 32)	Spartak Moscow	2019		11	4
8	Ivelin Popov	(Bulgaria)	MF	26 October 1987 (aged 31)	Spartak Moscow	2019		15	3
10	Aleksandr Zuyev	(Russia)	MF	26 June 1996 (aged 22)	Spartak Moscow	2018		53	3
11	Aleksei Ionov	(Russia)	MF	18 February 1989 (aged 30)	Dynamo Moscow	2017		51	11
15	Danil Glebov	(Russia)	MF	3 November 1999 (aged 19)	Anzhi Makhachkala	2019		11	0
17	Mathias Normann	(Norway)	MF	28 May 1996 (aged 22)	Brighton & Hove Albion	2019		11	0
18	Aleksandr Troshechkin	(Russia)	MF	23 April 1996 (aged 23)	Anzhi Makhachkala	2014		6	0
19	Baktiyar Zaynutdinov	(Kazakhstan)	MF	2 April 1998 (aged 21)	Astana	2019		12	0
84	Alexandru Gațcan	(Moldova)	MF	27 March 1984 (aged 35)	Rubin Kazan	2018		314	24
	Dmitri Veber	(Russia)	MF	10 February 1999 (aged 20)	SKA Rostov-on-Don	2016		3	0
Forwards
9	Björn Bergmann Sigurðarson	(Iceland)	ST	26 February 1991 (aged 28)	Molde	2018		32	6
14	Eldor Shomurodov	(Uzbekistan)	ST	29 June 1995 (aged 23)	Bunyodkor	2017		52	6
Out on loan
17	Anton Salétros	(Sweden)	MF	12 April 1996 (aged 23)	AIK	2018		9	1
21	Matija Boben	(Slovenia)	DF	26 February 1994 (aged 25)	ND Gorica	2017		9	0
23	Viðar Örn Kjartansson	(Iceland)	ST	11 March 1990 (aged 29)	Maccabi Tel Aviv	2018		11	2
	Maksim Skrynnik	(Russia)	MF	21 July 1999 (aged 19)	Academy	2018		0	0
	Khoren Bayramyan	(Russia)	MF	7 January 1992 (aged 27)	Academy	2011		67	1
	Reziuan Mirzov	(Russia)	MF	22 June 1993 (aged 25)	Akhmat Grozny	2017		3	0
	Saeid Ezatolahi	(Iran)	MF	1 October 1996 (aged 22)	Atlético Madrid C	2017		18	2
	Nikita Kryukov	(Russia)	MF	5 October 1999 (aged 19)	Academy	2018		0	0
	Dmitri Solovyov	(Russia)	MF	6 January 1998 (aged 21)	Academy	2017		0	0
Left during the season
7	Artur Yusupov	(Russia)	MF	1 September 1989 (aged 29)	Zenit St.Petersburg	2018		32	2
8	Ayaz Guliyev	(Russia)	MF	27 November 1996 (aged 22)	Spartak Moscow	2017		21	1
15	Sverrir Ingi Ingason	(Iceland)	DF	5 August 1993 (aged 25)	Granada	2017		49	5
20	Žan Majer	(Slovenia)	MF	25 July 1992 (aged 26)	Domžale	2017		17	0
77	Dmitri Skopintsev	(Russia)	MF	2 March 1997 (aged 22)	Liefering	2016		29	1

=== Out on loan ===
Note: Flags indicate national team as defined under FIFA eligibility rules; some limited exceptions apply. Players may hold more than one non-FIFA nationality.

No.	Pos.	Nation	Player
—	DF	SLO	Matija Boben (at Livorno)
—	DF	RUS	Maksim Skrynnik (at SKA Rostov-on-Don)
—	MF	RUS	Khoren Bayramyan (at Rubin Kazan)
—	MF	IRI	Saeid Ezatolahi (at Reading)

No.	Pos.	Nation	Player
—	MF	RUS	Nikita Kryukov (at Zenit-Izhevsk)
—	MF	RUS	Reziuan Mirzov (at Arsenal Tula)
—	MF	SWE	Anton Salétros (at AIK)
—	FW	RUS	Dmitri Solovyov (at Veles Moscow)

== Transfers ==
=== In ===
Date	Position	Nationality	Name	From	Fee	Ref.
27 May 2018	MF	(Russia)	Aleksandr Zuyev	Spartak Moscow	Undisclosed	
6 June 2018	MF	(Russia)	Ayaz Guliyev	Spartak Moscow	Undisclosed	
6 June 2018	MF	(Sweden)	Anton Salétros	AIK	Undisclosed	
20 June 2018	DF	(Russia)	Arseny Logashov	Baltika Kaliningrad	Undisclosed	
12 July 2018	DF	(Sweden)	Dennis Hadžikadunić	Malmö	Undisclosed	
25 July 2018	MF	(Russia)	Artur Yusupov	Zenit St.Petersburg	Free	
25 July 2018	MF	(Russia)	Artyom Shchadin	Kuban Krasnodar	Free	
31 August 2018	FW	(Iceland)	Viðar Örn Kjartansson	Maccabi Tel Aviv	Undisclosed	
	DF	(Russia)	Pavel Zenzura	Akademiya Futbola Rostov-on-Don		
	MF	(Russia)	Andrei Napolov	Kuban Krasnodar		
12 January 2019	MF	(Kazakhstan)	Baktiyar Zaynutdinov	Astana	Undisclosed	
13 January 2019	MF	(Russia)	Danil Glebov	Anzhi Makhachkala	Undisclosed	
18 January 2019	MF	(Finland)	Roman Eremenko	Spartak Moscow	Free	
24 January 2019	MF	(Bulgaria)	Ivelin Popov	Spartak Moscow	Undisclosed	
28 January 2019	MF	(Norway)	Mathias Normann	Brighton & Hove Albion	Undisclosed	
10 February 2019	DF	(Russia)	Yevgeni Chernov	Zenit St.Petersburg	Undisclosed	

=== Out ===
Date	Position	Nationality	Name	To	Fee	Ref.
7 June 2018	MF	(Georgia (country))	Nika Kacharava	Anorthosis Famagusta	Undisclosed	
12 June 2018	MF	(Russia)	Igor Kireyev	Mordovia Saransk	Undisclosed	
12 July 2018	GK	(Russia)	Yevgeni Goshev	Shinnik Yaroslavl	Undisclosed	
	GK	(Russia)	Danila Yermakov	Spartak Moscow	Undisclosed	
	DF	(Russia)	Dmitri Khristis	Akademiya Futbola Rostov-on-Don	Undisclosed	
	MF	(Russia)	Andrei Potapov	Saturn Ramenskoye	Undisclosed	
9 January 2019	MF	(Russia)	Ayaz Guliyev	Spartak Moscow	Undisclosed	
1 February 2019	DF	(Iceland)	Sverrir Ingi Ingason	PAOK	Undisclosed	
19 February 2019	MF	(Russia)	Dmitri Skopintsev	Krasnodar	Undisclosed	

=== Loans in ===
Date from	Position	Nationality	Name	From	Date to	Ref.
29 January 2019	DF	(Russia)	Ivan Novoseltsev	Zenit St.Petersburg	End of Season	
21 February 2019	DF	(Slovenia)	Miha Mevlja	Zenit St.Petersburg	End of Season	

=== Loans out ===
Date from	Position	Nationality	Name	To	Date to	Ref.
23 June 2018	MF	(Russia)	Khoren Bayramyan	Rubin Kazan	End of Season	
28 June 2018	FW	(Russia)	Dmitri Solovyov	Veles Moscow	End of Season	
20 July 2018	DF	(Russia)	Konstantin Pliyev	Baltika Kaliningrad	25 December 2018	
31 August 2018	MF	(Iran)	Saeid Ezatolahi	Reading	End of Season	
31 August 2018	MF	(Russia)	Reziuan Mirzov	Arsenal Tula	End of Season	
31 August 2018	MF	(Russia)	Aleksandr Troshechkin	Avangard Kursk	Winter 2019	
	DF	(Russia)	Maksim Skrynnik	SKA Rostov-on-Don		
	MF	(Russia)	Nikita Kryukov	Zenit-Izhevsk		
28 January 2019	DF	(Slovenia)	Matija Boben	Livorno	End of Season	
6 February 2019	MF	(Sweden)	Anton Salétros	AIK	End of Season	
18 March 2019	FW	(Iceland)	Viðar Örn Kjartansson	Hammarby	End of Season	

=== Released ===
Date	Position	Nationality	Name	Joined	Date	Ref.
30 June 2018	MF	(Mali)	Moussa Doumbia	Reims	1 July 2018	
4 July 2018	MF	(Moldova)	Valeriu Ciupercă	Tambov	13 July 2018	
5 July 2018	FW	(Russia)	Vladimir Dyadyun	Baltika Kaliningrad	5 July 2018	
21 August 2018	MF	(Russia)	Aleksandr Sapeta	Nizhny Novgorod		
23 August 2018	DF	(Russia)	Yevgeni Makeyev	Sochi	31 August 2018	
	MF	(Russia)	Sergei Zabrodin			
	MF	(Russia)	Ilya Maletsky			
	MF	(Russia)	Sergei Ponedelnik			
	MF	(Russia)	Elvin Talibov			
	MF	(Russia)	Sergei Kiryakov			
11 January 2019	MF	(Russia)	Artur Yusupov	Dynamo Moscow	14 January 2019	
1 February 2019	MF	(Slovenia)	Žan Majer	Lecce	20 February 2019	
31 May 2019	MF	(Belarus)	Timofei Kalachev	Retired		

== Friendlies ==
29 Friday 2018	Rostov (Russia)	2 – 0	(Serbia) Partizan	Austria
19:00 MSK (UTC+3)	Gațcan (yellow card) 10'; Mirzov 20'; Kalachev 21'; Pliyev (yellow card) 50'	Report

2 July 2018	Rostov (Russia)	1 – 1	(Serbia) Radnički Niš	Austria
19:00 MSK (UTC+3)	Ionov 39' (pen.); Wilusz (yellow card) 81'; Mirzov (yellow card) 88'	Report	78'

5 July 2018	Rostov (Russia)	1 – 1	(Slovakia) Trenčín	Austria
19:00 MSK (UTC+3)	Panyukov 57'	Report	32'

14 July 2018	Rostov (Russia)	1 – 2	(Czech Republic) Slavia Prague	Wieselburg, Austria
19:00 MSK (UTC+3)	Shomurodov 76'	Report	Stoch 34'; Tecl 51'

19 July 2018	Rostov (Russia)	0 – 4	(Croatia) Hajduk Split	Antalya, Turkey
19:00 MSK (UTC+3)	Gațcan (yellow card) 30'	Report	Hamza 22'; Caktaš 34'; Ivanovski 60'; Gyurcsó 70'

11 January 2019	Rostov (Russia)	1 – 1	(Albania) Kukësi	Antalya, Turkey
16:30 MSK (UTC+3)	Zuyev 17'	Report	42'

14 January 2019	Rostov (Russia)	1 – 0	(Kazakhstan) Atyrau
17:00 MSK (UTC+3)	Ionov 65'	Report

21 January 2019 2019 Match Premier Cup	Rostov (Russia)	1 – 2	(Russia) Spartak Moscow	Doha, Qatar
20:00 MSK (UTC+3)	Luiz Adriano 58' (pen.); Glushakov 90'	Report	Kjartansson 40'	Stadium: Aspire Dome

25 January 2019 2019 Match Premier Cup	Rostov (Russia)	1 – 1 (3 – 4 p)	(Russia) Lokomotiv Moscow	Doha, Qatar
21:30 MSK (UTC+3)	Kjartansson 56'	Report	Barinov 49'	Stadium: Aspire Dome
	Penalties
	Sigurðsson (penalty missed); Eremenko (penalty scored); Osinov (penalty scored); Ionov (penalty scored); Hadžikadunić (penalty missed)		Eder (penalty missed); Zhemaletdinov (penalty scored); Barinov (penalty scored); Tugarev (penalty scored); Höwedes (penalty scored)

28 January 2019 2019 Match Premier Cup	Rostov (Russia)	0 – 5	(Russia) Zenit St.Petersburg	Doha, Qatar
20:00 MSK (UTC+3)		Report	Kuzyayev 41'; Dzyuba 53'; Shatov 60'; Terentyev 87', 88'	Stadium: Aspire Dome

8 February 2019	Rostov (Russia)	2 – 4	(Sweden) Östersunds	Marbella, Spain
18:30 MSK (UTC+3)	Skopintsev 1'; Pliyev (yellow card) 10'; Kjartansson 60'; Normann (yellow card) 84'	Report	44'; 63'; 69' (pen.); 90'

12 February 2019	Rostov (Russia)	1 – 1	(Norway) Vålerenga	Spain
20:00 MSK (UTC+3)	Ionov 86'	Report	63'

17 February 2019	Rostov (Russia)	1 – 1	(Norway) Lillestrøm	Spain
18:30 MSK (UTC+3)	29' (o.g.)	Report	65'

18 February 2019	Rostov (Russia)	3 – 0	(Latvia) Ventspils	Spain
18:30 MSK (UTC+3)	Popov 46', 78'; Shchadin 84'	Report

== Competitions ==
=== Russian Premier League ===
==== Results by round ====
Round	1	2	3	4	5	6	7	8	9	10	11	12	13	14	15	16	17	18	19	20	21	22	23	24	25	26	27	28	29	30
Ground	H	A	H	H	A	H	A	H	A	H	A	H	A	H	A	H	A	A	H	A	H	A	H	A	H	A	H	A	H	A
Result	W	W	L	W	W	D	D	D	W	L	L	W	D	D	L	D	L	D	D	W	W	L	W	L	L	D	D	D	W	L
Position	5	2	5	4	3	3	2	3	3	3	5	4	4	4	5	6	7	7	7	6	6	6	6	7	8	8	7	8	7	9

Updated to match(es) played on 26 May 2019. Source: See Results
A = Away; H = Home; W = Win; D = Draw; L = Loss

==== Results ====
28 July 2018 1	Rostov	1 – 0	Akhmat Grozny	Rostov-on-Don
21:30 MSK (UTC+3)	Sigurðarson 45+1'	Report	Semyonov (red card) 25'	Stadium: Rostov Arena; Attendance: 27,975; Referee: Aleksey Sukhoi

5 August 2018 2	CSKA Moscow	0 – 1	Rostov	Moscow
19:00 MSK (UTC+3)	Akhmetov (yellow card) 50'; Bijol (yellow card) 65'; Nababkin (yellow card) 90+3'	Report	Parshivlyuk 7'; Yusupov (yellow card) 52'	Stadium: VEB Arena; Referee: Evgeny Turbin

11 August 2018 3	Rostov	0 – 1	Krylia Sovetov	Rostov-on-Don
21:30 MSK (UTC+3)	Gațcan (yellow card) 49'	Report	Sobolev 45+2'	Stadium: Rostov Arena; Attendance: 30,986; Referee: Sergei Karasev

19 August 2018 4	Rostov	4 – 0	Yenisey Krasnoyarsk	Rostov-on-Don
21:30 MSK (UTC+3)	Sigurðarson 31', 35'; Wilusz (yellow card) 57'; Ionov 58'; Skopintsev (yellow card) 60'; Guliyev 83'	Report	Dugalić (yellow card) 57'	Stadium: Rostov Arena; Attendance: 21,850; Referee: Vitali Meshkov

24 August 2018 5	Arsenal Tula	0 – 1	Rostov	Tula
19:30 MSK (UTC+3)		Report	Ionov 65' (pen.); Zuyev (yellow card) 88'; Gațcan (yellow card) 90+4'	Stadium: Arsenal Stadium; Attendance: 12,289; Referee: Kirill Levnikov

31 August 2018 6	Rostov	1 – 1	Rubin Kazan	Rostov-on-Don
19:30 MSK (UTC+3)	Gațcan (yellow card) 8'; Ionov 37' (pen.); Parshivlyuk (yellow card) 50'; Yusupov (yellow card) 60'	Report	Sorokin 50'; Kambolov (yellow card) 63'; Konovalov (yellow card) 65'; Azmoun (yellow card) 78'; Shekari (yellow card) 89'	Stadium: Rostov Arena; Attendance: 40,012; Referee: Aleksei Yeskov

15 September 2018 7	Ural Yekaterinburg	1 – 1	Rostov	Yekaterinburg
17:30 MSK (UTC+3)	Haroyan 47'; Boumal (yellow card) 84'; Fidler (yellow card) 90+1'	Report	Ionov 49'; Guliyev (yellow card) 61'	Stadium: Central Stadium; Attendance: 18,337; Referee: Roman Galimov

22 September 2018 8	Rostov	0 – 0	Ufa	Rostov-on-Don
19:00 MSK (UTC+3)	Wilusz (yellow card) 29'	Report	Igboun (yellow card) 17'; Tabidze (yellow card) 71'; Carp (yellow card) 87'	Stadium: Rostov Arena; Attendance: 35,337; Referee: Vasiliy Kazartsev

30 September 2018 9	Spartak Moscow	0 – 1	Rostov	Moscow
19:00 MSK (UTC+3)		Report	Kalachev (yellow card) 13'; Parshivlyuk (yellow card) 23'; Zuyev 67'	Stadium: Otkritie Arena; Attendance: 33,328; Referee: Nikolay Voloshin

6 October 2018 10	Rostov	0 – 1	Orenburg	Rostov-on-Don
16:30 MSK (UTC+3)	Parshivlyuk (yellow card) 37'; Gațcan (yellow card) 90+1'	Report	Terekhov 11'; Andreyev (yellow card) 23'; Afonin (yellow card) 54'; Miškić (yellow card) 83'; Sutormin (yellow card) 90+2'; Oyewole (yellow card) 90+2'; Chukanov (yellow card) 90+3'	Stadium: Rostov Arena; Attendance: 25,147; Referee: Mikhail Vilkov

19 October 2018 11	Lokomotiv Moscow	2 – 1	Rostov	Moscow
20:30 MSK (UTC+3)	An.Miranchuk 26'; Barinov (yellow card) 42'; Kvirkvelia 60' (yellow card) 77'	Report	Ingason 27'; Guliyev (yellow card) 31'; Salétros (yellow card) 68'; Sigurðsson (yellow card) 87'	Stadium: RZD Arena; Attendance: 13,345; Referee: Sergey Lapochkin

27 October 2018 12	Rostov	1 – 0	Anzhi Makhachkala	Rostov-on-Don
19:00 MSK (UTC+3)	Skopintsev (yellow card) 16' (yellow-red card) 53'; Guliyev (yellow card) 25'; Sigurðarson 37'	Report	Chaykovskyi (yellow card) 56'; Chancellor (yellow card) 64'; Savichev (yellow card) 67'; Rabiu (yellow card) 89'	Stadium: Rostov Arena; Attendance: 31,267; Referee: Sergey Karasev

4 November 2018 13	Krasnodar	2 – 2	Rostov	Krasnodar
16:30 MSK (UTC+3)	Ari 16', 72'; Pereyra (yellow card) 56'; Stotsky (yellow card) 90+5'	Report	Shomurodov 7'; Ingason 81'; Parshivlyuk (yellow card) 90+5'	Stadium: Krasnodar Stadium; Attendance: 34,652; Referee: Mikhail Vilkov

10 November 2018 14	Rostov	0 – 0	Dynamo Moscow	Rostov-on-Don
19:00 MSK (UTC+3)	Ingason (yellow card) 25'	Report	Holmén (yellow card) 3'; Markov (yellow card) 45+1'; Šunjić (yellow card) 62'; Yevgenyev (yellow card) 85'	Stadium: Rostov Arena; Attendance: 27,437; Referee: Vitali Meshkov

25 November 2018 15	Zenit St.Petersburg	2 – 0	Rostov	Saint Petersburg
19:00 MSK (UTC+3)	Driussi 12'; Yerokhin 63'	Report	Guliyev (yellow card) 35' (yellow-red card) 81'; Sigurðsson (yellow card) 79'; Gațcan (yellow card) 89'	Stadium: Krestovsky Stadium; Attendance: 46,282; Referee: Mikhail Vilkov

2 December 2018 16	Rostov	0 – 0	CSKA Moscow	Rostov-on-Don
16:30 MSK (UTC+3)	Yusupov (yellow card) 49'; Zuyev (yellow card) 56'	Report	Vlašić (yellow card) 4' (penalty missed) 55'; Oblyakov (yellow card) 49' (yellow-red card) 89'; Shchennikov (yellow card) 64'	Stadium: Rostov Arena; Attendance: 32,182; Referee: Kirill Levnikov

8 December 2018 17	Krylia Sovetov	1 – 0	Rostov	Samara
12:30 MSK (UTC+3)	Bashkirov (yellow card) 2'; Anton 11' (pen.); Kornilenko (yellow card) 26' (yellow-red card) 44'; Sheydayev (yellow card) 82'; Samardžić (yellow card) 86'	Report	Hadžikadunić (yellow card) 10'; Gațcan (yellow card) 74' (yellow-red card) 85'; Sigurðsson (red card) 82'; Ingason (yellow card) 90+4'	Stadium: Samara Arena; Attendance: 7,213; Referee: Sergei Karasev

3 March 2019 18	Yenisey Krasnoyarsk	1 – 1	Rostov	Sochi
14:00 MSK (UTC+3)	Gadzhibekov (yellow card) 23'; Khubulov (yellow card) 76'; Sobolev (yellow card) 80'; Sarr 83'; Danchenko (yellow card) 90+4'	Report	Normann (yellow card) 40'; Sigurðarson 68'	Stadium: Fisht Olympic Stadium; Attendance: 5,116; Referee: Aleksei Matyunin

10 March 2019 19	Rostov	0 – 0	Arsenal Tula	Rostov-on-Don
14:00 MSK (UTC+3)	Sigurðarson (yellow card) 21'; Eremenko (yellow card) 83'; Novoseltsev (yellow card) 90+1'	Report	Bakayev (yellow card) 66'	Stadium: Rostov Arena; Attendance: 1,850; Referee: Aleksey Sukhoy

16 March 2019 20	Rubin Kazan	0 – 2	Rostov	Kazan
16:30 MSK (UTC+3)		Report	Eremenko (yellow card) 8' (goal) 83', 89'; Zaynutdinov (yellow card) 70'	Stadium: Kazan Arena; Attendance: 5,101; Referee: Sergey Lapochkin

30 March 2019 21	Rostov	2 – 1	Ural Yekaterinburg	Rostov-on-Don
18:00 MSK (UTC+3)	Ionov 10'; Parshivlyuk (yellow card) 15'; Zuyev (yellow card) 67'; Normann (yellow card) 86'; Pogrebnyak 90+3' (o.g.)	Report	El Kabir 52'; Pogrebnyak (yellow card) 79'	Stadium: Rostov Arena; Attendance: 27,487; Referee: Vasiliy Kazartsev

7 April 2019 22	Ufa	1 – 0	Rostov	Ufa
11:30 MSK (UTC+3)	Igboun 25'; Carp (yellow card) 54'; Jokić (yellow card) 90+2'	Report	Zaynutdinov (yellow card) 24'; Normann (yellow card) 71'	Stadium: Neftyanik Stadium; Attendance: 10,287; Referee: Aleksei Matyunin

14 April 2019 23	Rostov	2 – 1	Spartak Moscow	Rostov-on-Don
19:00 MSK (UTC+3)	Gațcan 13'; Parshivlyuk (yellow card) 28'; Glebov (yellow card) 45'; Logashov (yellow card) 56'; Eremenko (yellow card) 61'; Shomurodov 80'	Report	Zobnin 27'; Bocchetti (yellow card) 64'; Melkadze (yellow card) 77'	Stadium: Rostov Arena; Attendance: 41,097; Referee: Vladislav Bezborodov

20 April 2019 24	Orenburg	3 – 0	Rostov	Orenburg
14:00 MSK (UTC+3)	Normann 41' (o.g.); Galadzhan 60' (yellow card) 81'; Chirkin (yellow card) 90+1'	Report	Normann (yellow card) 39'; Novoseltsev (yellow card) 82'	Stadium: Gazovik Stadium; Attendance: 5,471; Referee: Mikhail Vilkov

24 April 2019 25	Rostov	1 – 2	Lokomotiv Moscow	Rostov-on-Don
19:00 MSK (UTC+3)	Zaynutdinov (yellow card) 25'; Ionov 39' (pen.); Gațcan (yellow card) 60'; Glebov (yellow card) 77'	Report	Farfán 5', 83' (yellow card) 7'; Al.Miranchuk (yellow card) 20'; Guilherme (yellow card) 90+1'	Stadium: Rostov Arena; Attendance: 29,173; Referee: Vitali Meshkov

27 April 2019 26	Anzhi Makhachkala	1 – 1	Rostov	Kaspiysk
16:30 MSK (UTC+3)	Zakirov 77'; Elmurzayev (yellow card) 84'	Report	Eremenko 35'; Aleksandr Zuyev (yellow card) 55'	Stadium: Anzhi Arena; Referee: Sergei Karasev

5 May 2019 27	Rostov	1 – 1	Krasnodar	Rostov-on-Don
19:00 MSK (UTC+3)	Novoseltsev (yellow card) 24'; Glebov (yellow card) 67'; Hadžikadunić (yellow card) 85'; Shomurodov 89'; Parshivlyuk (yellow card) 90+1'	Report	Claesson 25' (pen.); Gazinsky (yellow card) 72'	Stadium: Rostov Arena; Referee: Vasiliy Kazartsev

10 May 2019 28	Dynamo Moscow	0 – 0	Rostov	Khimki
14:00 MSK (UTC+3)		Report		Stadium: Arena Khimki; Attendance: 5,497; Referee: Vitali Meshkov

19 May 2019 29	Rostov	1 – 0	Zenit St.Petersburg	Rostov-on-Don
19:00 MSK (UTC+3)	Glebov (yellow card) 56'; Popov 67' (pen.)	Report	Mammana (yellow card) 66'; Rigoni (yellow card) 70'; Nabiullin (yellow card) 90+2'	Stadium: Rostov Arena; Attendance: 35,586; Referee: Pavel Kukuyan

26 May 2019 30	Akhmat Grozny	1 – 0	Rostov	Grozny
14:00 MSK (UTC+3)	Semyonov (yellow card) 20'; Mbengue 38'	Report	Sigurðsson (yellow card) 8'; Ionov (yellow card) 44'; Pliyev (yellow card) 48'; Glebov (yellow card) 52'; Kalachev (yellow card) 77'; Gațcan (yellow card) 83'	Stadium: Akhmat-Arena; Attendance: 8,630; Referee: Vasily Kazartsev

==== League table ====
Pos	Team	Pld	W	D	L	GF	GA	GD	Pts
7	Orenburg	30	12	7	11	39	34	+5	43
8	Akhmat Grozny	30	11	9	10	29	30	−1	42
9	Rostov	30	10	11	9	25	23	+2	41
10	Ural Yekaterinburg	30	10	8	12	33	45	−12	38
11	Rubin Kazan	30	7	15	8	24	30	−6	36

Updated to match(es) played on 26 May 2019. Source: Russian Premier League, Soccerway
Rules for classification: 1) Points; 2) Head-to-head points; 3) Head-to-head matches won; 4) Head-to-head goal difference; 5) Head-to-head goals scored; 6) Head-to-head away goals; 7) Matches won; 8) Goal difference; 9) Goals scored; 10) Away goals scored; 11) Play-off.

=== Russian Cup ===
26 September 2018 Round of 32	Syzran-2003	0 – 4	Rostov	Syzran
17:00 MSK (UTC+3)		Report	Shomurodov 21'; Salétros 31'; Kjartansson 64', 69'	Stadium: Kristall Stadium; Attendance: 2,070; Referee: Ivan Saraev

1 November 2018 Round of 16	Rostov	3 – 1	Zenit St.Petersburg	Rostov-on-Don
19:00 MSK (UTC+3)	Logashov 4'; Ionov (yellow card) 13'; Ingason (yellow card) 28'; Yusupov 83'; Hadžikadunić 90'; Skopintsev (yellow card) 90+3'	Report	Driussi 29' (pen.); Zabolotny (yellow card) 68'; Neto (yellow card) 83'; Ivanović (yellow card) 90+4'	Stadium: Rostov Arena; Attendance: 35,086; Referee: Roman Galimov

5 December 2018 Quarterfinal 1st leg	Krasnodar	2 – 2	Rostov	Krasnodar
19:30 MSK (UTC+3)	Ignatyev 17'; Cueva 31'	Report	Skopintsev 40'; Zuyev (yellow card) 56'; Majer (yellow card) 57'; Gațcan 89'	Stadium: Krasnodar Stadium; Attendance: 15,428; Referee: Evgeny Turbin

24 February 2019 Quarterfinal 2nd leg	Rostov	1 – 0	Krasnodar	Rostov-on-Don
19:00 MSK (UTC+3)	Zuyev (yellow card) 29'; Shomurodov (yellow card) 62'; Popov (yellow card) 83' (goal) 87'; Pesyakov (yellow card) 90+3'	Report	Gazinsky (yellow card) 39'; Spajić (yellow card) 48'; Ramírez (yellow card) 59'; Kaboré (yellow card) 64'	Stadium: Rostov Arena; Attendance: 10,171; Referee: Vladimir Moskalyov

3 April 2018 Semifinal 1st leg	Lokomotiv Moscow	2 – 2	Rostov	Moscow
19:30 MSK (UTC+3)	Kvirkvelia (yellow card) 28'; Barinov (yellow card) 54'; An.Miranchuk 67'; Ćorluka (yellow card) 83'; Novoseltsev 85' (o.g.)	Report	Eremenko 50'; Popov 84' (pen.); Logashov (yellow card) 90+6'	Stadium: RZD Arena; Referee: Kirill Levnikov

15 May 2019 Semifinal 2nd leg	Rostov	0 – 2 (2 – 4 agg.)	Lokomotiv Moscow	Rostov-on-Don
19:30 MSK (UTC+3)	Zaynutdinov (yellow card) 7'; Glebov (yellow card) 76'; Pliyev (yellow card) 79'	Report	Kvirkvelia (yellow card) 37'; Zhemaletdinov (yellow card) 44' (goal) 45+2'; Smolov 62'	Stadium: Rostov Arena; Attendance: 32,580; Referee: Sergey Lapochkin

== Squad statistics ==
As of match played 26 May 2019

=== Appearances and goals ===
No.	Pos	Nat	Player	Total		Premier League		Russian Cup	
No.	Pos	Nat	Player	Apps	Goals	Apps	Goals	Apps	Goals
2	MF	(Belarus) BLR	Timofei Kalachev	14	0	5+7	0	1+1	0
3	DF	(Poland) POL	Maciej Wilusz	17	0	16	0	1	0
4	DF	(Russia) RUS	Sergei Parshivlyuk	26	1	22+2	1	2	0
5	DF	(Sweden) SWE	Dennis Hadžikadunić	12	1	8	0	4	1
6	DF	(Iceland) ISL	Ragnar Sigurðsson	31	0	27	0	3+1	0
7	MF	(Finland) FIN	Roman Eremenko	11	4	9	3	2	1
8	MF	(Bulgaria) BUL	Ivelin Popov	15	3	8+4	1	2+1	2
9	FW	(Iceland) ISL	Björn Bergmann Sigurðarson	26	5	21+5	5	0	0
10	MF	(Russia) RUS	Aleksandr Zuyev	26	1	9+13	1	3+1	0
11	MF	(Russia) RUS	Aleksei Ionov	30	6	20+5	6	5	0
14	FW	(Uzbekistan) UZB	Eldor Shomurodov	32	4	10+16	3	2+4	1
15	MF	(Russia) RUS	Danil Glebov	11	0	6+2	0	1+2	0
17	MF	(Norway) NOR	Mathias Normann	11	0	9	0	1+1	0
19	MF	(Kazakhstan) KAZ	Baktiyar Zaynutdinov	12	0	4+6	0	2	0
24	DF	(Slovenia) SLO	Miha Mevlja	8	0	7	0	1	0
25	DF	(Russia) RUS	Arseny Logashov	17	1	10+3	0	4	1
28	DF	(Russia) RUS	Yevgeni Chernov	15	0	12	0	3	0
30	GK	(Russia) RUS	Sergei Pesyakov	25	0	19	0	6	0
31	GK	(Russia) RUS	Ilya Abayev	11	0	11	0	0	0
33	DF	(Russia) RUS	Konstantin Pliyev	5	0	2+2	0	1	0
71	MF	(Russia) RUS	Dmitri Veber	1	0	0	0	0+1	0
80	DF	(Russia) RUS	Ivan Novoseltsev	12	0	8+1	0	2+1	0
81	DF	(Russia) RUS	Mikhail Osinov	1	0	0	0	0+1	0
84	MF	(Moldova) MDA	Alexandru Gațcan	29	2	23+1	1	4+1	1
92	MF	(Russia) RUS	Artyom Shchadin	8	0	2+4	0	1+1	0
Players away from the club on loan:
17	MF	(Sweden) SWE	Anton Salétros	9	1	6	0	3	1
21	DF	(Slovenia) SLO	Matija Boben	1	0	0	0	1	0
22	MF	(Russia) RUS	Reziuan Mirzov	3	0	0+3	0	0	0
23	FW	(Iceland) ISL	Viðar Örn Kjartansson	11	2	1+7	0	3	2
Players who left Rostov during the season:
7	MF	(Russia) RUS	Artur Yusupov	16	1	10+3	0	2+1	1
8	MF	(Russia) RUS	Ayaz Guliyev	15	1	13+1	1	0+1	0
15	DF	(Iceland) ISL	Sverrir Ingi Ingason	19	2	17	2	2	0
20	MF	(Slovenia) SLO	Žan Majer	2	0	0	0	2	0
77	MF	(Russia) RUS	Dmitri Skopintsev	17	1	15	0	2	1

=== Goal scorers ===
Place	Position	Nation	Number	Name	Premier League	Russian Cup	Total
1	MF	(Russia)	11	Aleksei Ionov	6	0	6
2	FW	(Iceland)	9	Björn Bergmann Sigurðarson	5	0	5
3	MF	(Finland)	7	Roman Eremenko	3	1	4
3	FW	(Uzbekistan)	14	Eldor Shomurodov	3	1	4
5	MF	(Bulgaria)	8	Ivelin Popov	1	2	3
6	DF	(Iceland)	15	Sverrir Ingi Ingason	2	0	2
6	MF	(Moldova)	84	Alexandru Gațcan	1	1	2
6	FW	(Iceland)	23	Viðar Örn Kjartansson	0	2	2
9	DF	(Russia)	4	Sergei Parshivlyuk	1	0	1
9	MF	(Russia)	8	Ayaz Guliyev	1	0	1
9	MF	(Russia)	10	Aleksandr Zuyev	1	0	1
9	MF	(Sweden)	17	Anton Salétros	0	1	1
9	DF	(Russia)	25	Arseny Logashov	0	1	1
9	MF	(Russia)	7	Artur Yusupov	0	1	1
9	DF	(Sweden)	5	Dennis Hadžikadunić	0	1	1
9	MF	(Russia)	77	Dmitri Skopintsev	0	1	1
9				Own goal	1	0	1
				TOTALS	25	12	37

=== Disciplinary record ===
Number	Nation	Position	Name	Premier League		Russian Cup		Total	
Number	Nation	Position	Name	Yellow card	Red card	Yellow card	Red card	Yellow card	Red card
2	(Belarus)	MF	Timofei Kalachev	2	0	0	0	2	0
3	(Poland)	DF	Maciej Wilusz	2	0	0	0	2	0
4	(Russia)	DF	Sergei Parshivlyuk	7	0	0	0	7	0
5	(Sweden)	DF	Dennis Hadžikadunić	2	0	0	0	2	0
6	(Iceland)	DF	Ragnar Sigurðsson	3	1	0	0	3	1
7	(Finland)	MF	Roman Eremenko	3	0	0	0	3	0
8	(Bulgaria)	MF	Ivelin Popov	0	0	1	0	1	0
9	(Iceland)	FW	Björn Bergmann Sigurðarson	1	0	0	0	1	0
10	(Russia)	MF	Aleksandr Zuyev	4	0	2	0	6	0
11	(Russia)	MF	Aleksei Ionov	1	0	1	0	2	0
14	(Uzbekistan)	FW	Eldor Shomurodov	0	0	1	0	1	0
15	(Russia)	MF	Danil Glebov	5	0	1	0	6	0
17	(Norway)	MF	Mathias Normann	4	0	0	0	4	0
19	(Norway)	MF	Baktiyar Zaynutdinov	3	0	1	0	4	0
25	(Russia)	DF	Arseny Logashov	1	0	1	0	2	0
30	(Russia)	GK	Sergei Pesyakov	0	0	1	0	1	0
33	(Russia)	DF	Konstantin Pliyev	1	0	1	0	2	0
80	(Russia)	DF	Ivan Novoseltsev	3	0	0	0	3	0
84	(Moldova)	MF	Alexandru Gațcan	9	1	0	0	9	1
Players away on loan:
17	(Sweden)	MF	Anton Salétros	1	0	0	0	1	0
Players who left Rostov during the season:
7	(Russia)	MF	Artur Yusupov	3	0	0	0	3	0
8	(Russia)	MF	Ayaz Guliyev	5	1	0	0	5	1
15	(Iceland)	DF	Sverrir Ingi Ingason	3	0	1	0	4	0
20	(Slovenia)	MF	Žan Majer	0	0	1	0	1	0
77	(Russia)	MF	Dmitri Skopintsev	3	1	1	0	4	1
			TOTALS	66	4	13	0	79	4
