= 2018–19 FC Zenit Saint Petersburg season =

FC Zenit Saint Petersburg
2018–19 season
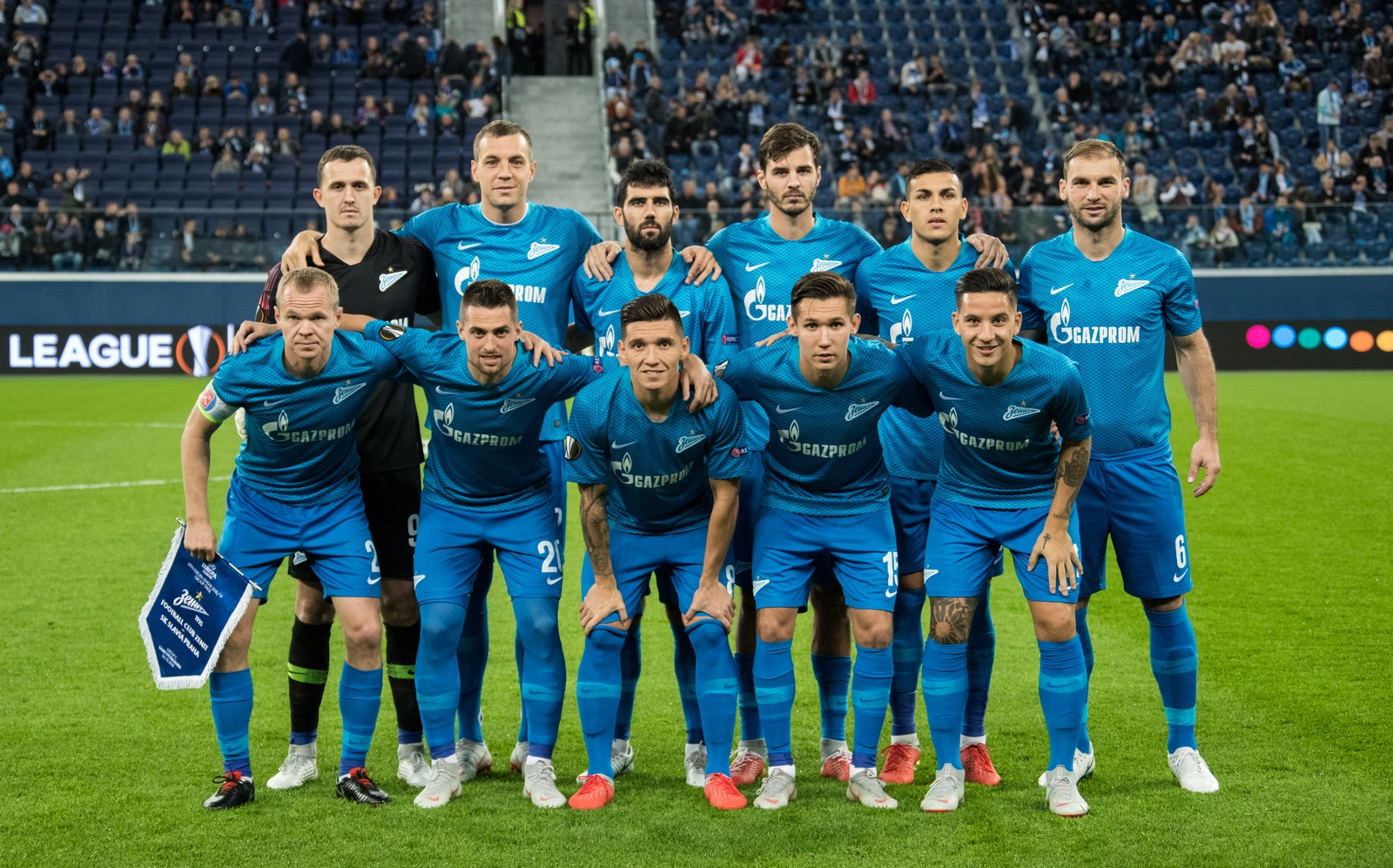
- Zenit Saint Petersburg lining up against Slavia Prague
- Chairman: Sergey Fursenko
- Manager: Sergey Semak
- Stadium: Krestovsky Stadium
- Russian Premier League: 1st
- Russian Cup: Round of 16 vs Rostov
- Europa League: Round of 16 vs Villarreal
- Top goalscorer: League: Sebastián Driussi (11); All: Two Players (13)
Home colours	Away colours

The 2018–19 Zenit Saint Petersburg season was the 94th season in the club's history and its 23rd consecutive season in the Russian Premier League. The club also participated in the Russian Cup and the UEFA Europa League. Zenit finished the season 1st, winning their 5th Russian Premier League title.

== Season events ==
Prior to the start of the season, 29 May 2018, Sergey Semak replaced Roberto Mancini as manager of Zenit.

== Squad ==
As of match played 26 May 2019

No.	Name	Nationality	Position	Date of birth (age)	Signed from	Signed in	Contract ends	Apps.	Goals
Goalkeepers
41	Mikhail Kerzhakov	(Russia)	GK	28 January 1987 (age 39)	Anzhi Makhachkala	2015		20	0
99	Andrey Lunyov	(Russia)	GK	13 November 1991 (age 35)	Ufa	2016	2021	82	0
Defenders
2	Aleksandr Anyukov	(Russia)	DF	28 September 1982 (age 44)	Krylia Sovetov	2005		417	13
3	Denis Terentyev	(Russia)	DF	13 August 1992 (age 34)	Rostov	2017		10	0
6	Branislav Ivanović	(Serbia)	DF	22 February 1984 (age 42)	Chelsea	2017	2019	89	7
13	Luís Neto	(Portugal)	DF	26 May 1988 (age 38)	Siena	2013		171	1
15	Elmir Nabiullin	(Russia)	DF	8 March 1995 (age 31)	Rubin Kazan	2018	2022	22	0
19	Igor Smolnikov	(Russia)	DF	8 August 1988 (age 38)	Krasnodar	2013		179	9
30	Emanuel Mammana	(Argentina)	DF	10 February 1996 (age 30)	Lyon	2017	2022	37	0
44	Yaroslav Rakitskyi	(Ukraine)	DF	3 August 1989 (age 37)	Shakhtar Donetsk	2019	2022	16	3
54	Nikita Kakkoyev	(Russia)	DF	22 August 1999 (age 27)	Academy	2016		1	0
80	Ilya Skrobotov	(Russia)	DF	6 July 2000 (age 26)	Academy	2017		4	1
88	Dmitri Bogayev	(Russia)	DF	24 January 1994 (age 32)	Palanga	2017	2020	7	0
	Sergei Zuykov	(Russia)	DF	19 September 1993 (age 33)	Volgar Astrakhan	2017		0	0
Midfielders
8	Matías Kranevitter	(Argentina)	MF	21 May 1993 (age 33)	Atlético Madrid	2017	2021	47	0
10	Claudio Marchisio	(Italy)	MF	19 January 1986 (age 40)	Juventus	2018	2020	15	2
14	Daler Kuzyayev	(Russia)	MF	15 January 1993 (age 33)	Terek Grozny	2017	2020	65	9
16	Christian Noboa	(Ecuador)	MF	9 April 1985 (age 41)	Rostov	2017	2020	21	1
17	Oleg Shatov	(Russia)	MF	29 July 1990 (age 36)	Anzhi Makhachkala	2013		171	27
18	Yuri Zhirkov	(Russia)	MF	20 August 1983 (age 43)	Dynamo Moscow	2016		79	2
20	Róbert Mak	(Slovakia)	MF	8 March 1991 (age 35)	PAOK	2016	2020	61	12
21	Aleksandr Yerokhin	(Russia)	MF	13 October 1989 (age 37)	Rostov	2017	2020	64	14
24	Emiliano Rigoni	(Argentina)	MF	4 February 1993 (age 33)	Independiente	2017	2021	40	9
25	Wílmar Barrios	(Colombia)	MF	16 October 1993 (age 33)	Boca Juniors	2019	2023	14	1
27	Magomed Ozdoyev	(Russia)	MF	5 November 1992 (age 34)	Rubin Kazan	2018	2022	29	1
33	Hernani	(Brazil)	MF	27 March 1994 (age 32)	Atlético Paranaense	2016	2021	36	1
38	Leon Musayev	(Russia)	MF	25 January 1999 (age 27)	Academy	2016		5	0
46	Vitali Gorulyov	(Russia)	MF	30 July 1998 (age 28)	Academy	2015		0	0
55	Kirill Kaplenko	(Russia)	MF	15 June 1999 (age 27)	Krasnodar	2017		3	0
Forwards
7	Sardar Azmoun	(Iran)	FW	1 January 1995 (age 31)	Rubin Kazan	2019	2022	16	12
9	Aleksandr Kokorin	(Russia)	FW	19 March 1991 (age 35)	Dynamo Moscow	2016		92	34
11	Sebastián Driussi	(Argentina)	FW	9 February 1996 (age 30)	River Plate	2017	2021	82	19
22	Artem Dzyuba	(Russia)	FW	22 August 1988 (age 38)	Spartak Moscow	2015		138	52
29	Anton Zabolotny	(Russia)	FW	13 June 1991 (age 35)	Tosno	2018	2021	43	4
Away on loan
1	Yuri Lodygin	(Russia)	GK	26 May 1990 (age 36)	Skoda Xanthi	2013		164	0
23	Miha Mevlja	(Slovenia)	DF	12 June 1990 (age 36)	Rostov	2017	2021	42	1
	Yegor Baburin	(Russia)	GK	9 August 1993 (age 33)	Academy	2010		7	0
	Igor Obukhov	(Russia)	GK	29 May 1996 (age 30)	Academy	2012		0	0
	Ivan Novoseltsev	(Russia)	DF	25 August 1991 (age 35)	Rostov	2016		9	0
	Ibragim Tsallagov	(Russia)	DF	12 December 1990 (age 35)	Krylia Sovetov	2017	2020	8	0
	Luka Đorđević	(Montenegro)	FW	9 July 1994 (age 32)	Mogren	2012		29	3
	Dmitry Poloz	(Russia)	FW	12 July 1991 (age 35)	Rostov	2017	2020	31	3
	Andrei Panyukov	(Russia)	FW	25 September 1994 (age 32)	Atlantas	2017	2020	2	0
Left during the season
5	Leandro Paredes	(Argentina)	MF	29 June 1994 (age 32)	Roma	2018	2022	60	10
28	Yevgeni Chernov	(Russia)	DF	23 October 1992 (age 34)	Tom Tomsk	2016	2018	13	0
	Maksim Karpov	(Russia)	DF	17 March 1995 (age 31)	Academy	2013		1	0

=== Out on loan ===
Note: Flags indicate national team as defined under FIFA eligibility rules; some limited exceptions apply. Players may hold more than one non-FIFA nationality.

No.	Pos.	Nation	Player
7	FW	RUS	Dmitry Poloz (at Rubin Kazan)
25	DF	RUS	Ivan Novoseltsev (at Rostov)
28	DF	RUS	Ibragim Tsallagov (at Rubin Kazan)
71	GK	RUS	Yegor Baburin (at Rubin Kazan)

No.	Pos.	Nation	Player
77	DF	MNE	Luka Đorđević (at Arsenal Tula)
—	GK	RUS	Igor Obukhov (at Tyumen)
—	FW	RUS	Daniil Lesovoy (at Arsenal Tula)
—	FW	RUS	Andrei Panyukov (at Ural Yekaterinburg)

== Transfers ==
=== In ===
Date	Position	Nationality	Name	From	Fee	Ref.
3 September 2018	MF	(Italy)	Claudio Marchisio	Juventus	Free	
28 January 2019	DF	(Ukraine)	Yaroslav Rakitskyi	Shakhtar Donetsk	Undisclosed	
1 February 2019	MF	(Colombia)	Wílmar Barrios	Boca Juniors	Undisclosed	
1 February 2019	FW	(Iran)	Sardar Azmoun	Rubin Kazan	Undisclosed	

=== Out ===
Date	Position	Nationality	Name	To	Fee	Ref.
5 July 2018	GK	(Russia)	Aleksandr Vasyutin	Sarpsborg 08	Undisclosed	
10 July 2018	MF	(Russia)	Vladislav Sirotov	Zagłębie Lubin	Undisclosed	
13 January 2019	DF	(Russia)	Maksim Karpov	Krylia Sovetov	Undisclosed	
29 January 2019	MF	(Argentina)	Leandro Paredes	Paris Saint-Germain	Undisclosed	

=== Loans out ===
Date from	Position	Nationality	Name	To	Date to	Ref.
13 July 2018	GK	(Russia)	Igor Obukhov	Tyumen	End of Season	
26 July 2018	FW	(Russia)	Dmitry Poloz	Rubin Kazan	End of Season	
27 July 2018	DF	(Russia)	Ivan Novoseltsev	Anzhi Makhachkala	5 January 2019	
27 July 2018	DF	(Russia)	Ibragim Tsallagov	Rubin Kazan	End of Season	
28 July 2018	FW	(Russia)	Daniil Lesovoy	Arsenal Tula	End of Season	
4 August 2018	FW	(Montenegro)	Luka Đorđević	Arsenal Tula	End of Season	
9 August 2018	FW	(Russia)	Andrei Panyukov	Ural Yekaterinburg	End of Season	
17 August 2018	FW	(Argentina)	Emiliano Rigoni	Atalanta	14 January 2019	
29 August 2018	GK	(Russia)	Yegor Baburin	Rubin Kazan	End of Season	
1 September 2018	DF	(Russia)	Maksim Karpov	Rotor Volgograd	13 January 2019	
27 January 2019	GK	(Russia)	Yuri Lodygin	Olympiacos	End of Season	
29 January 2019	DF	(Russia)	Ivan Novoseltsev	Rostov	End of Season	
21 February 2019	DF	(Slovenia)	Miha Mevlja	Rostov	End of Season	
25 February 2019	FW	(Russia)	Ivan Tarasov	HJK	End of Season	

=== Released ===
Date	Position	Nationality	Name	Joined	Date	Ref.
8 May 2018	MF	(Russia)	Viktor Fayzulin	Retired		
31 May 2018	DF	(Italy)	Domenico Criscito	Genoa	6 June 2018	
10 June 2018	MF	(Russia)	Aleksandr Ryazantsev	Khimki	14 September 2018	
18 June 2018	DF	(Russia)	Danil Krugovoy	Ufa	18 June 2018	
30 June 2018	MF	(Russia)	Aleksei Isayev	Sumgayit	1 July 2018	
25 July 2018	MF	(Russia)	Artur Yusupov	Rostov	25 July 2018	
	FW	(Russia)	Stanislav Krapukhin	Tom Tomsk	13 July 2018	
	GK	(Russia)	Amir Fattakhov			
	MF	(Russia)	Yefim Boytsov	Khimki		
	MF	(England)	Jacob Gardiner-Smith	St Albans City		
	MF	(Russia)	Konstantin Kotov	Luki-Energiya Velikiye Luki		
	MF	(Russia)	Ivan Kulyov			
	MF	(Russia)	Nikita Miroshnichenko			
	FW	(Russia)	Yegor Denisov	Arsenal Tula		
	FW	(Russia)	Artyom Dyakonov			
	FW	(Russia)	Nikita Povarov	Leningradets Leningrad Oblast		
15 January 2019	DF	(Russia)	Yevgeni Chernov	Rostov	10 February 2019	
26 May 2019	DF	(Portugal)	Luís Neto	Sporting CP	1 July 2019	

== Friendlies ==
24 June 2018	Zenit St.Petersburg (Russia)	1 – 0	(Austria) Pinzgau Saalfelden	Mittersill, Austria
19:00 MSK (UTC+3)	Shatov 5'	Report		Stadium: Waldstadion Mittersill

8 July 2018	Zenit St.Petersburg (Russia)	5 – 0	(Russia) Dynamo Moscow	Oberndorf in Tirol, Austria
19:00 MSK (UTC+3)	Zabolotny (yellow card) 28'; Hernani 39'; Đorđević 66', 84'; Mak 81'; Skrobotov 90'	Report	Sosnin (yellow card) 31'	Stadium: FC Oberndorf Training Ground

11 July 2018	Zenit St.Petersburg (Russia)	2 – 0	(Switzerland) Grasshoppers	Schwendau, Austria
18:00 MSK (UTC+3)	Đorđević 35'; Mevlja (yellow card) 58'; Driussi 73'	Report		Stadium: Linden Stadium

17 July 2018	Zenit St.Petersburg (Russia)	3 – 2	(Italy) Genoa	Neustift im Stubaital, Austria
18:00 MSK (UTC+3)	Ozdoyev 34'; Driussi 66'; Kuzyayev 89'	Report	Rômulo 21'; Lapadula 55'	Stadium: Shorthplatz Neustift

21 July 2018	Inter Milan (Italy)	3 – 3	(Russia) Zenit St.Petersburg	Neustift im Stubaital, Austria
21:15 MSK (UTC+3)	Candreva 16'; Icardi 50' (pen.); Martínez 75'	Report	Noboa 27'; Mak 64'; Hernani 73'	Stadium: Shorthplatz Neustift

9 September 2018	Zenit St.Petersburg (Russia)	1 – 0	(Kazakhstan) Kairat	Saint Petersburg, Russia
18:00 MSK (UTC+3)	Driussi 32'	Report		Stadium: Krestovsky Stadium; Attendance: 40,122

18 November 2018	Zenit St.Petersburg (Russia)	2 – 1	(Germany) Schalke 04	Saint Petersburg, Russia
15:00 MSK (UTC+3)	Kranevitter 6'; Hernani (yellow card) 25'; Ozdoyev 79'; Terentyev (yellow card) 82'	Report	Bentaleb (yellow card) 29'; Skrzybski 35'	Stadium: Krestovsky Stadium; Attendance: 41,214; Referee: Sergey Lapochkin

22 January 2019 2019 Match Premier Cup	Zenit St.Petersburg	1 – 3	Lokomotiv Moscow	Doha, Qatar
20:00 MSK (UTC+3)	Rigoni 82'	Report	Smolov 35'; An. Miranchuk 37'; Mironov 51'; Tarasov (yellow card) 62'; Eder (yellow card) 68'; Barinov (yellow card) 72'	Stadium: Aspire Dome

25 January 2019 2019 Match Premier Cup	Zenit St.Petersburg	0 – 3	Spartak Moscow	Doha, Qatar
18:30 MSK (UTC+3)	Neto (yellow card) 14'; Hernani (yellow card) 61'	Report	Melkadze 28'; Glushakov 29'; Luiz Adriano 73'; Dzhikiya (yellow card) 73'; Kutepov (yellow card) 77'; Umyarov (yellow card) 90'	Stadium: Aspire Dome

28 January 2019 2019 Match Premier Cup	Zenit St.Petersburg	5 – 0	Rostov	Doha, Qatar
20:00 MSK (UTC+3)	Kuzyayev 41'; Dzyuba 53'; Shatov 60'; Terentyev 87', 88'	Report	Glebov (yellow card) 16'; Gațcan (yellow card) 75'	Stadium: Aspire Dome

2 February 2019	Zenit St.Petersburg (Russia)	2 – 0	(Spain) Elche	Alicante, Spain
14:00 MSK (UTC+3)	Vorobyov 60'; Musayev 90'	Report		Stadium: Estadio Manuel Martínez Valero

4 February 2019	Zenit St.Petersburg (Russia)	0 – 0	(Luxembourg) F91 Dudelange	San Pedro del Pinatar, Spain
20:00 MSK (UTC+3)	Marchisio (yellow card) 84'	Report		Stadium: Pinatar Arena

8 February 2019	Zenit St.Petersburg (Russia)	2 – 1	(Norway) Sarpsborg 08	Algorfa, Spain
18:00 MSK (UTC+3)	Nabiullin 2'; Rigoni 64'	Report		Stadium: La Finca

== Competitions ==
=== Russian Premier League ===
==== Results by round ====
Round	1	2	3	4	5	6	7	8	9	10	11	12	13	14	15	16	17	18	19	20	21	22	23	24	25	26	27	28	29	30
Ground	A	H	A	H	A	H	A	H	A	H	A	A	H	A	H	A	H	A	H	A	H	A	H	A	H	H	A	H	A	H
Result	W	W	W	W	W	D	W	W	L	W	L	W	W	L	W	L	L	W	W	D	W	D	W	W	W	W	D	W	L	W
Position	1	1	1	1	1	1	1	1	1	1	1	1	1	1	1	1	1	1	1	1	1	1	1	1	1	1	1	1	1	1

Updated to match(es) played on 26 May 2019. Source: See Results
A = Away; H = Home; W = Win; D = Draw; L = Loss

==== Results ====
29 July 2018 1	Yenisey Krasnoyarsk	0–2	Zenit St.Petersburg	Tyumen
14:00 MSK (UTC+3)	Dugalić (yellow card) 23'; Yatchenko (yellow card) 67'	Report	Ivanović (yellow card) 32'; Smolnikov (yellow card) 45'; Dzyuba 81'; Kuzyayev 85'	Stadium: Geolog Stadium; Attendance: 10,724; Referee: Vladimir Moskalev
Note: Match played at the Geolog Stadium in Tyumen, due renovation work at Yenisey Krasnoyarsk's Central Stadium in Krasnoyarsk.

4 August 2018 2	Zenit St.Petersburg	1 – 0	Arsenal Tula	Saint Petersburg
16:30 MSK (UTC+3)	Paredes (yellow card) 49'; Shatov 61'; Nabiullin (yellow card) 76'	Report	Grigalava (yellow card) 90'	Stadium: Krestovsky Stadium; Attendance: 47,004; Referee: Aleksei Matyunin

12 August 2018 3	Rubin Kazan	0 – 1	Zenit St.Petersburg	Kazan
19:00 MSK (UTC+3)	Kudryashov (yellow card) 43'; Konovalov (yellow card) 73'	Report	Mevlja (yellow card) 54'; Kuzyayev (yellow card) 64' (yellow-red card) 71'; Yerokhin 78'	Stadium: Kazan Arena; Attendance: 23,840; Referee: Mikhail Vilkov

19 August 2018 4	Zenit St.Petersburg	4 – 1	Ural Yekaterinburg	Saint Petersburg
19:00 MSK (UTC+3)	Driussi 12', 16'; Dzyuba 78'; Kranevitter (yellow card) 85'; Paredes 89'	Report	Bavin 6'; Bicfalvi (yellow card) 43'; Haroyan (yellow card) 74'; Yevseyev (yellow card) 88'	Stadium: Krestovsky Stadium; Attendance: 45,545; Referee: Stanislav Vasilyev

26 August 2018 5	Ufa	0 – 2	Zenit St.Petersburg	Ufa
16:30 MSK (UTC+3)	Paurević (yellow card) 49'; Oblyakov (yellow card) 54'; Alikin (yellow card) 63'; Jokić (yellow card) 68' (red card) 68'; Krotov (yellow card) 89'	Report	Paurević 3' (o.g.); Dzyuba 11'; Yerokhin (yellow card) 69'; Paredes (yellow card) 83'	Stadium: Neftyanik Stadium; Attendance: 10,587; Referee: Nikolay Voloshin

2 September 2018 6	Zenit St.Petersburg	0 – 0	Spartak Moscow	Saint Petersburg
19:00 MSK (UTC+3)	Ivanović (yellow card) 45'	Report	Bocchetti (yellow card) 34'; Rasskazov (yellow card) 44'; Zé Luís (yellow card) 54'; Melgarejo (yellow card) 83'; Popov (yellow card) 90+3'	Stadium: Krestovsky Stadium; Attendance: 61,467; Referee: Vladimir Moskalev

16 September 2018 7	Orenburg	1 – 2	Zenit St.Petersburg	Orenburg
14:00 MSK (UTC+3)	Miškić (yellow card) 41'; Oyewole 48'	Report	Yerokhin 14', 45'; Smolnikov (yellow card) 50'; Neto (yellow card) 53'	Stadium: Gazovik Stadium; Attendance: 7,023; Referee: Vitali Meshkov

23 September 2018 8	Zenit St.Petersburg	5 – 3	Lokomotiv Moscow	Saint Petersburg
16:30 MSK (UTC+3)	Shatov 13', 64'; Kuzyayev (yellow card) 27'; Yerokhin 48'; Dzyuba 57'; Hernani (yellow card) 87'; Driussi 90' (yellow card) 90'	Report	Barinov 17' (yellow card) 29'; Ignatyev (yellow card) 34'; Idowu (yellow card) 72'; Al.Miranchuk 74'; Tarasov (yellow card) 80' (yellow-red card) 82'; Smolov 85'	Stadium: Krestovsky Stadium; Attendance: 50,193; Referee: Roman Galimov

30 September 2018 9	Anzhi Makhachkala	2 – 1	Zenit St.Petersburg	Kaspiysk
14:00 MSK (UTC+3)	Savichev (yellow card) 5'; Chaykovskyi (yellow card) 59'; Udaly (yellow card) 60'; Ponce 71' (yellow card) 72'; Belorukov (red card) 76'; Kulik 83' (pen.); Dyupin (yellow card) 90+4'	Report	Paredes (yellow card) 9'; Marchisio 47'; Smolnikov (yellow card) 82'	Stadium: Anzhi Arena; Attendance: 6,350; Referee: Aleksei Matyunin

7 October 2018 10	Zenit St.Petersburg	2 – 1	Krasnodar	Saint Petersburg
16:30 MSK (UTC+3)	Kuzyayev (yellow card) 17'; Dzyuba 50'; Mak 65'; Neto (yellow card) 78'; Ivanović (yellow card) 80'; Paredes (yellow card) 83'	Report	Martynovich (yellow card) 14'; Stotsky (yellow card) 39'; Gazinsky (yellow card) 48'; Mamayev 81' (pen.); Petrov (red card) 85'; Claesson (yellow card) 90+1'	Stadium: Krestovsky Stadium; Attendance: 52,576; Referee: Aleksei Eskov

21 October 2018 11	Dynamo Moscow	1 – 0	Zenit St.Petersburg	Khimki
14:00 MSK (UTC+3)	Holmén (yellow card) 23'; Tetteh (yellow card) 25'; Černych 75'	Report	Driussi (yellow card) 28' (yellow-red card) 37'; Kranevitter (yellow card) 69'	Stadium: Arena Khimki; Attendance: 12,734; Referee: Sergey Ivanov

29 October 2018 12	Krylia Sovetov	0 – 1	Zenit St.Petersburg	Samara
18:00 MSK (UTC+3)	Rogel (yellow card) 8' (yellow-red card) 78'; Kornilenko (yellow card) 59'; Chicherin (yellow card) 63'	Report	Paredes 22'; Mammana (yellow card) 52'; Neto (yellow card) 60'	Stadium: Samara Arena; Attendance: 27,102; Referee: Nikolay Voloshin

4 November 2018 13	Zenit St.Petersburg	1 – 0	Akhmat Grozny	Saint Petersburg
14:00 MSK (UTC+3)	Marchisio 32' (pen.); Paredes (yellow card) 69' (yellow-red card) 83'; Yerokhin (yellow card) 79'	Report	Ravanelli (yellow card) 20'	Stadium: Krestovsky Stadium; Attendance: 45,349; Referee: Sergei Karasev

11 November 2018 14	CSKA Moscow	2 – 0	Zenit St.Petersburg	Moscow
19:00 MSK (UTC+3)	Chalov 15'; Sigurðsson 26'; Akhmetov (yellow card) 31'; Becão (yellow card) 38'	Report	Neto (yellow card) 37'; Zabolotny (yellow card) 83'	Stadium: VEB Arena; Attendance: 23,836; Referee: Vladimir Moskalev

25 November 2018 15	Zenit St.Petersburg	2 – 0	Rostov	Saint Petersburg
19:00 MSK (UTC+3)	Driussi 12'; Yerokhin 63'	Report	Guliyev (yellow card) 35' (yellow-red card) 81'; Sigurðsson (yellow card) 79'; Gațcan (yellow card) 89'	Stadium: Krestovsky Stadium; Attendance: 46,282; Referee: Mikhail Vilkov

3 December 2018 16	Arsenal Tula	4 – 2	Zenit St.Petersburg	Tula
19:30 MSK (UTC+3)	Kangwa 6', 74'; Álvarez (yellow card) 21'; Mirzov 39' (yellow card) 41'; Bakayev 77'	Report	Kuzyayev 21' (yellow card) 53'; Paredes (yellow card) 41'; Hernani 57'; Dzyuba (yellow card) 71'; Anyukov (yellow card) 86'	Stadium: Arsenal Stadium; Attendance: 10,658; Referee: Aleksei Eskov

9 December 2018 17	Zenit St.Petersburg	1 – 2	Rubin Kazan	Saint Petersburg
19:00 MSK (UTC+3)	Hernani (yellow card) 18'; Shatov (yellow card) 28'; Neto (yellow card) 48'; Paredes (yellow card) 55' (goal) 59' (pen.); Marchisio (yellow card) 85'	Report	Sorokin 7', 50'; Bayramyan (yellow card) 29'; Kalinin (yellow card) 39'; Sagitov (yellow card) 61'; Uremović (yellow card) 78'; Granat (yellow card) 90+4'	Stadium: Krestovsky Stadium; Attendance: 48,657; Referee: Aleksei Matyunin

2 March 2019 18	Ural Yekaterinburg	0 – 1	Zenit St.Petersburg	Yekaterinburg
11:30 MSK (UTC+3)	Boumal (yellow card) 30'; Bicfalvi (yellow card) 70'; El Kabir (yellow card) 85'	Report	Azmoun 42'; Lunyov (yellow card) 90+3'	Stadium: Central Stadium; Attendance: 20,365; Referee: Vitali Meshkov

10 March 2019 19	Zenit St.Petersburg	2 – 1	Ufa	Saint Petersburg
16:30 MSK (UTC+3)	Azmoun 30'; Rigoni 34'	Report	Bizjak (yellow card) 15'; Carp 25'; Igboun (yellow card) 67'	Stadium: Krestovsky Stadium; Attendance: 42,464; Referee: Aleksei Eskov

17 March 2019 20	Spartak Moscow	1 – 1	Zenit St.Petersburg	Moscow
19:00 MSK (UTC+3)	Glushakov 13' (yellow card) 61'; Dzhikiya (yellow card) 34'; Zobnin (yellow card) 57'; Hanni (yellow card) 86'	Report	Barrios 27' (yellow card) 90+1'; Smolnikov (yellow card) 45'; Azmoun (yellow card) 55'	Stadium: Otkritie Arena; Attendance: 43,616; Referee: Vladimir Moskalev

31 March 2019 21	Zenit St.Petersburg	3 – 1	Orenburg	Saint Petersburg
14:00 MSK (UTC+3)	Zhirkov (yellow card) 40'; Azmoun 48', 88'; Rakitskiy (yellow card) 76' (goal) 81'	Report	Sutormin 33'; Malykh (yellow card) 75'	Stadium: Krestovsky Stadium; Attendance: 43,154; Referee: Nikolay Voloshin

7 April 2019 22	Lokomotiv Moscow	1 – 1	Zenit St.Petersburg	Moscow
19:00 MSK (UTC+3)	Eder (yellow card) 14'; Kvaratskhelia (yellow card) 39'; Ćorluka (yellow card) 53'; Driussi 61' (o.g.); Rybus (yellow card) 79'; An.Miranchuk (yellow card) 82'	Report	Rigoni (yellow card) 49'; Rakitskiy 54'; Ozdoyev (yellow card) 62'; Barrios (yellow card) 89'	Stadium: RZD Arena; Attendance: 21,158; Referee: Sergey Ivanov

14 April 2019 23	Zenit St.Petersburg	5 – 0	Anzhi Makhachkala	Saint Petersburg
16:30 MSK (UTC+3)	Azmoun 2'; Ivanović 9'; Rigoni 83'; Driussi 88', 89'	Report	Ondoua (yellow card) 79'	Stadium: Krestovsky Stadium; Attendance: 44,701; Referee: Mikhail Vilkov

20 April 2019 24	Krasnodar	2 – 3	Zenit St.Petersburg	Krasnodar
21:00 MSK (UTC+3)	Ignatyev 25'; Pereyra (yellow card) 67' (goal) 90+1'; Suleymanov (yellow card) 85'	Report	Dzyuba 19', 90+5'; Rigoni (yellow card) 35'; Smolnikov (yellow card) 45'; Rakitskiy (yellow card) 47' (goal) 69'; Barrios (yellow card) 71'; Anyukov (yellow card) 84'; Azmoun (yellow card) 90+7'	Stadium: Krasnodar Stadium; Attendance: 34,382; Referee: Sergei Karasev

24 April 2019 25	Zenit St.Petersburg	2 – 0	Dynamo Moscow	Saint Petersburg
21:00 MSK (UTC+3)	Barrios (yellow card) 52'; Dzyuba 60'; Azmoun 66'	Report	Panchenko (yellow card) 6'; Sow (yellow card) 20'	Stadium: Krestovsky Stadium; Attendance: 42,406; Referee: Sergey Ivanov

28 April 2019 26	Zenit St.Petersburg	4 – 2	Krylia Sovetov	Saint Petersburg
16:30 MSK (UTC+3)	Azmoun 9', 30'; Driussi (yellow card) 14'; Burlak 35' (o.g.); Ozdoyev (yellow card) 47'; Rigoni (yellow card) 54'; Zhirkov (yellow card) 88'; Smolnikov 90+1'	Report	Tkachuk 40', 44'; Sheydayev (yellow card) 47' (yellow-red card) 78'; Rabiu (yellow card) 49'	Stadium: Krestovsky Stadium; Attendance: 40,463; Referee: Aleksei Eskov

4 May 2019 27	Akhmat Grozny	1 – 1	Zenit St.Petersburg	Grozny
16:30 MSK (UTC+3)	Ismael 55'; Utsiyev (yellow card) 74'	Report	Driussi 87'	Stadium: Akhmat-Arena; Attendance: 12,894; Referee: Aleksei Matyunin

12 May 2019 28	Zenit St.Petersburg	3 – 1	CSKA Moscow	Saint Petersburg
19:00 MSK (UTC+3)	Rakitskiy (yellow card) 32'; Driussi 38', 86'; Zhirkov (yellow card) 50'; Rigoni 62'; Dzyuba (yellow card) 73'; Nabiullin (yellow card) 84'	Report	Bijol (yellow card) 4'; Akhmetov (yellow card) 7'; Oblyakov 30'; Vlašić (yellow card) 32'; Shchennikov (yellow card) 70'	Stadium: Krestovsky Stadium; Attendance: 61,494; Referee: Evgeny Turbin

19 May 2019 29	Rostov	1 – 0	Zenit St.Petersburg	Rostov-on-Don
19:00 MSK (UTC+3)	Glebov (yellow card) 56'; Popov 67' (pen.)	Report	Mammana (yellow card) 66'; Rigoni (yellow card) 70'; Nabiullin (yellow card) 90+2'	Stadium: Rostov Arena; Attendance: 35,586; Referee: Pavel Kukuyan

26 May 2019 30	Zenit St.Petersburg	4 – 1	Yenisey Krasnoyarsk	Saint Petersburg
14:00 MSK (UTC+3)	Azmoun 26' (pen.); Yerokhin (yellow card) 50' (goal) 60'; Driussi 57', 71'	Report	Kutyin (yellow card) 25'; Torbinski 84'	Stadium: Krestovsky Stadium; Attendance: 50,073; Referee: Aleksey Sukhoy

==== League table ====
Pos	Team	Pld	W	D	L	GF	GA	GD	Pts	Qualification or relegation
1	Zenit Saint Petersburg (C)	30	20	4	6	57	29	+28	64	Qualification for the Champions League group stage
2	Lokomotiv Moscow	30	16	8	6	45	28	+17	56 (Note: Head-to-head away goals: Lokomotiv 1, Krasnodar 0.)	Qualification for the Champions League group stage
3	Krasnodar	30	16	8	6	55	23	+32	56	Qualification for the Champions League third qualifying round
4	CSKA Moscow	30	14	9	7	46	23	+23	51	Qualification for the Europa League group stage (Note: Lokomotiv Moscow won the 2018–19 Russian Cup. As they already qualified for the Champions League, the Europa League group stage spot (originally designated for the Cup winner) goes to the fourth-placed team, third qualifying round spot goes to fifth-placed team and second qualifying round spot goes to sixth-placed team.)
5	Spartak Moscow	30	14	7	9	36	31	+5	49	Qualification for the Europa League third qualifying round

Updated to match(es) played on 26 May 2019. Source: Russian Premier League, Soccerway
Rules for classification: 1) Points; 2) Head-to-head points; 3) Head-to-head matches won; 4) Head-to-head goal difference; 5) Head-to-head goals scored; 6) Head-to-head away goals; 7) Matches won; 8) Goal difference; 9) Goals scored; 10) Away goals scored; 11) Play-off.
(C) Champions

=== Russian Cup ===
26 September 2018 Round of 32	Volgar Astrakhan	0 – 4	Zenit St.Petersburg	Astrakhan
18:00 MSK (UTC+3)	Berdnikov (yellow card) 32'	Report	Anyukov 8'; Mak 35'; Zabolotny 61'; Mammana (yellow card) 70'; Kokorin 88'	Stadium: Central Stadium; Attendance: 16,200; Referee: Aleksey Sukhoy

1 November 2018 Round of 16	Rostov	3 – 1	Zenit St.Petersburg	Rostov-on-Don
19:00 MSK (UTC+3)	Logashov 4'; Ionov (yellow card) 13'; Ingason (yellow card) 28'; Yusupov 83'; Hadžikadunić 90'; Skopintsev (yellow card) 90+3'	Report	Driussi 29' (pen.); Zabolotny (yellow card) 68'; Neto (yellow card) 83'; Ivanović (yellow card) 90+4'	Stadium: Rostov Arena; Attendance: 35,086; Referee: Roman Galimov

=== UEFA Europa League ===
==== Qualifying phase ====
9 August 2018 Third qualifying round 1st leg	Dinamo Minsk (Belarus)	4 – 0	(Russia) Zenit St.Petersburg	Minsk, Belarus
20:00 MSK (UTC+3)	Nikolić 12', 67'; Khvashchynski 32'; Begunov (yellow card) 34'; Galović 41'; Shvyatsow (yellow card) 89'	Report	Mevlja (yellow card) 45+2'; Kuzyayev (yellow card) 71'	Stadium: Dinamo Stadium; Attendance: 21,750; Referee: Anastasios Papapétrou (Greece)

16 August 2018 Third qualifying round 2nd leg	Zenit St.Petersburg (Russia)	8 – 1 (8 – 5 agg.)	(Belarus) Dinamo Minsk	Saint Petersburg, Russia
20:00 MSK (UTC+3)	Noboa (yellow card) 11', (goal) 66'; Paredes 22', (yellow card) 64' (yellow-red card) 72'; Dzyuba 75', 78', 115' (pen.); Driussi 109'; Mak 120+1' (pen.), 120+3'	Report	Begunov (yellow card) 22'; Shvyatsow (yellow card) 45+2' (yellow-red card) 120+1'; Yahaya 99'	Stadium: Petrovsky Stadium; Attendance: 220 (Behind Closed Doors); Referee: Sébastien Delferière (Belgium)
Note: Zenit St.Petersburg played their third qualifying round home match at Petrovsky Stadium, Saint Petersburg, instead of their regular stadium Krestovsky Stadium, Saint Petersburg.

23 August 2018 Playoff round 1st leg	Zenit St.Petersburg (Russia)	3 – 1	(Norway) Molde	Saint Petersburg, Russia
19:00 MSK (UTC+3)	Smolnikov (yellow card) 61'; Dzyuba 71'; Zabolotny 80'; Hernani (yellow card) 87'; Mevlja 90'	Report	Forren (yellow card) 31'; Hestad (yellow card) 38' (goal) 42'	Stadium: Krestovsky Stadium; Attendance: 40,677; Referee: Deniz Aytekin (Germany)

30 August 2018 Playoff round 2nd leg	Molde (Norway)	2 – 1 (3 – 4 agg.)	(Russia) Zenit St.Petersburg	Molde, Norway
20:00 MSK (UTC+3)	Hestad 65'; Haaland (yellow card) 75' (goal) 77'; Forren (yellow card) 89'	Report	Kuzyayev 21'	Stadium: Aker Stadion; Referee: Carlos del Cerro Grande (Spain)

==== Group stage ====
Pos	Team	Pld	W	D	L	GF	GA	GD	Pts	Qualification
1	(Russia) Zenit Saint Petersburg	6	3	2	1	6	5	+1	11	Advance to knockout phase
2	(Czech Republic) Slavia Prague	6	3	1	2	4	3	+1	10	Advance to knockout phase
3	(France) Bordeaux	6	2	1	3	6	6	0	7	
4	(Denmark) Copenhagen	6	1	2	3	3	5	−2	5	

Source: UEFA
Rules for classification: Group stage tiebreakers

20 September 2018 1	Copenhagen (Denmark)	1 – 1	(Russia) Zenit St.Petersburg	Copenhagen, Denmark
22:00 MSK (UTC+3)	Boilesen (yellow card) 37'; Sotiriou 63'; Bjelland (yellow card) 68'; Papagiannopoulos (yellow card) 90+5'	Report	Mak 44'; Dzyuba (yellow card) 90'; Marchisio (yellow card) 90+4'	Stadium: Parken Stadium; Attendance: 19,005; Referee: Georgi Kabakov (Bulgaria)

4 October 2018 2	Zenit St.Petersburg (Russia)	1 – 0	(Czech Republic) Slavia Prague	Saint Petersburg, Russia
19:55 MSK (UTC+3)	Kokorin 80'; Neto (yellow card) 90+5'	Report	Souček (yellow card) 36'; Băluță (yellow card) 60'	Stadium: Krestovsky Stadium; Attendance: 45,408; Referee: Hüseyin Göçek (Turkey)

25 October 2018 3	Zenit St.Petersburg (Russia)	2 – 1	(France) Bordeaux	Saint Petersburg, Russia
19:55 MSK (UTC+3)	Paredes (yellow card) 38'; Dzyuba 41' (penalty missed) 53'; Yerokhin (yellow card) 78'; Kuzyayev 85'; Neto (yellow card) 87'; Ivanović (yellow card) 90+2'	Report	Briand 26'; Otávio (yellow card) 90+2'	Stadium: Krestovsky Stadium; Attendance: 45,723; Referee: Felix Brych (Germany)

8 November 2018 4	Bordeaux (France)	1 – 1	(Russia) Zenit St.Petersburg	Bordeaux, France
23:00 MSK (UTC+3)	Kamano 35' (pen.) (yellow card) 65'; Jovanović (yellow card) 41'	Report	Anyukov (yellow card) 23'; Nabiullin (yellow card) 31'; Lunyov (yellow card) 35'; Neto (yellow card) 59'; Zabolotny 72'	Stadium: Nouveau Stade de Bordeaux; Attendance: 8,907; Referee: Harald Lechner (Austria)

29 November 2018 5	Zenit St.Petersburg (Russia)	1 – 0	(Denmark) Copenhagen	Saint Petersburg, Russia
20:55 MSK (UTC+3)	Mak 59'; Yerokhin (yellow card) 67'; Ozdoyev (yellow card) 89'	Report	Skov (yellow card) 63'; Zeca (yellow card) 73'	Stadium: Krestovsky Stadium; Attendance: 45,199; Referee: Slavko Vinčić (Slovenia)

13 December 2018 6	Slavia Prague (Czech Republic)	2 – 0	(Russia) Zenit St.Petersburg	Prague, Czech Republic
23:00 MSK (UTC+3)	Škoda (yellow card) 25'; Zmrhal 32'; Stoch 41' (yellow card) 86'	Report	Nabiullin (yellow card) 37'; Hernani (yellow card) 67'	Stadium: Eden Arena; Attendance: 17,748; Referee: Andrew Dallas (Scotland)

==== Knockout phase ====
12 February 2019 Round of 32 1st Leg	Fenerbahçe (Turkey)	1 – 0	(Russia) Zenit St.Petersburg	Istanbul, Turkey
20:55 MSK (UTC+3)	Isla (yellow card) 14'; Slimani 21'; Çiftpınar (yellow card) 31'	Report	Rakitskiy (yellow card) 5'; Anyukov (yellow card) 40'; Mak (penalty missed) 44' (yellow card) 68'	Stadium: Şükrü Saracoğlu Stadium; Attendance: 36,572; Referee: Ruddy Buquet (France)

21 February 2019 Round of 32 2nd Leg	Zenit St.Petersburg (Russia)	3 – 1 (3 – 2 agg.)	(Turkey) Fenerbahçe	Saint Petersburg, Russia
20:55 MSK (UTC+3)	Ozdoyev 4'; Azmoun (yellow card) 18' (goal) 37', 76'; Hernani (yellow card) 34'; Barrios (yellow card) 50'	Report	Škrtel (yellow card) 40'; Topal 43'; Potuk (yellow card) 45+1'; Arslan (yellow card) 71'; Özbayraklı (yellow card) 83'; Elmas (yellow card) 90'	Stadium: Krestovsky Stadium; Attendance: 50,448; Referee: Michael Oliver (England)

7 March 2019 Round of 16 1st Leg	Zenit St.Petersburg (Russia)	1 – 3	(Spain) Villarreal	Saint Petersburg, Russia
20:55 MSK (UTC+3)	Azmoun 35'; Barrios (yellow card) 37'; Smolnikov (yellow card) 76'	Report	Costa (yellow card) 14'; Iborra 33'; Gerard 64'; Miguelón (yellow card) 68'; Morlanes 71'	Stadium: Krestovsky Stadium; Attendance: 51,826; Referee: Gianluca Rocchi (Italy)

14 March 2019 Round of 16 2nd Leg	Villarreal (Spain)	2 – 1 (5 – 2 agg.)	(Russia) Zenit St.Petersburg	Villarreal, Spain
23:00 MSK (UTC+3)	Gerard 29'; Bacca 47'; Ruiz (yellow card) 52'; Costa (yellow card) 82'	Report	Shatov (yellow card) 56'; Ivanović 90+1'	Stadium: Estadio de la Cerámica; Attendance: 14,027; Referee: Artur Soares Dias (Portugal)

== Squad statistics ==
As of match played 26 May 2019

=== Appearances and goals ===
No.	Pos	Nat	Player	Total		Premier League		Russian Cup		Europa League	
No.	Pos	Nat	Player	Apps	Goals	Apps	Goals	Apps	Goals	Apps	Goals
2	DF	(Russia) RUS	Aleksandr Anyukov	28	1	7+9	0	2	1	10	0
3	DF	(Russia) RUS	Denis Terentyev	1	0	0+1	0	0	0	0	0
6	DF	(Serbia) SRB	Branislav Ivanović	40	2	27	1	1	0	12	1
7	FW	(Iran) IRI	Sardar Azmoun	16	12	12	9	0	0	3+1	3
8	MF	(Argentina) ARG	Matías Kranevitter	15	0	2+4	0	2	0	5+2	0
9	FW	(Russia) RUS	Aleksandr Kokorin	5	2	0+3	0	0+1	1	0+1	1
10	MF	(Italy) ITA	Claudio Marchisio	15	2	5+4	2	1	0	2+3	0
11	FW	(Argentina) ARG	Sebastián Driussi	42	13	21+6	11	1	1	12+2	1
13	DF	(Portugal) POR	Luís Neto	21	0	13	0	2	0	5+1	0
14	MF	(Russia) RUS	Daler Kuzyayev	29	4	15+2	2	0+1	0	8+3	2
15	DF	(Russia) RUS	Elmir Nabiullin	20	0	10+1	0	1+1	0	7	0
16	MF	(Ecuador) ECU	Christian Noboa	12	1	8+3	0	0	0	1	1
17	MF	(Russia) RUS	Oleg Shatov	27	3	11+8	3	1	0	3+4	0
18	MF	(Russia) RUS	Yuri Zhirkov	12	0	12	0	0	0	0	0
19	DF	(Russia) RUS	Igor Smolnikov	31	1	21+2	1	0	0	7+1	0
20	MF	(Slovakia) SVK	Róbert Mak	38	6	17+7	1	1	1	7+6	4
21	MF	(Russia) RUS	Aleksandr Yerokhin	26	6	13+3	6	1	0	7+2	0
22	FW	(Russia) RUS	Artem Dzyuba	37	13	27	8	0+1	0	9	5
24	MF	(Argentina) ARG	Emiliano Rigoni	12	3	8+3	3	0	0	1	0
25	MF	(Colombia) COL	Wílmar Barrios	14	1	10	1	0	0	4	0
27	MF	(Russia) RUS	Magomed Ozdoyev	25	1	10+6	0	2	0	3+4	1
29	FW	(Russia) RUS	Anton Zabolotny	30	3	1+15	0	2	1	3+9	2
30	DF	(Argentina) ARG	Emanuel Mammana	11	0	4+2	0	0+1	0	4	0
33	MF	(Brazil) BRA	Hernani	26	1	5+9	1	1+1	0	9+1	0
38	MF	(Russia) RUS	Leon Musayev	5	0	1+3	0	0	0	0+1	0
41	GK	(Russia) RUS	Mikhail Kerzhakov	4	0	1	0	1	0	1+1	0
44	DF	(Ukraine) UKR	Yaroslav Rakitskiy	16	3	12	3	0	0	4	0
99	GK	(Russia) RUS	Andrey Lunyov	42	0	29	0	1	0	12	0
Players away from the club on loan:
1	GK	(Russia) RUS	Yuri Lodygin	1	0	0	0	0	0	1	0
23	DF	(Slovenia) SLO	Miha Mevlja	14	1	6	0	1	0	7	1
Players who left Zenit during the season:
5	MF	(Argentina) ARG	Leandro Paredes	22	4	15	3	0	0	7	1
28	DF	(Russia) RUS	Yevgeni Chernov	6	0	5	0	1	0	0	0

=== Goal Scorers ===
Place	Position	Nation	Number	Name	Premier League	Russian Cup	Europa League	Total
2	FW	(Argentina)	11	Sebastián Driussi	11	1	1	13
2	FW	(Russia)	22	Artem Dzyuba	8	0	5	13
3	FW	(Iran)	7	Sardar Azmoun	9	0	3	12
4	MF	(Russia)	21	Aleksandr Yerokhin	6	0	0	6
4	MF	(Slovakia)	20	Róbert Mak	1	1	4	6
6	MF	(Argentina)	5	Leandro Paredes	3	0	1	4
6	MF	(Russia)	14	Daler Kuzyayev	2	0	2	4
8	MF	(Russia)	17	Oleg Shatov	3	0	0	3
8	DF	(Ukraine)	44	Yaroslav Rakitskiy	3	0	0	3
8	MF	(Argentina)	24	Emiliano Rigoni	3	0	0	3
8	FW	(Russia)	29	Anton Zabolotny	0	1	2	3
13	MF	(Italy)	10	Claudio Marchisio	2	0	0	2
13	DF	(Serbia)	6	Branislav Ivanović	1	0	1	2
13	FW	(Russia)	9	Aleksandr Kokorin	0	1	1	2
13				Own goal	2	0	0	2
17	MF	(Brazil)	33	Hernani	1	0	0	1
17	MF	(Colombia)	25	Wílmar Barrios	1	0	0	1
17	DF	(Russia)	19	Igor Smolnikov	1	0	0	1
17	DF	(Russia)	2	Aleksandr Anyukov	0	1	0	1
17	MF	(Ecuador)	16	Christian Noboa	0	0	1	1
17	DF	(Slovenia)	23	Miha Mevlja	0	0	1	1
17	MF	(Russia)	27	Magomed Ozdoyev	0	0	1	1
				TOTALS	57	5	21	83

=== Disciplinary record ===
Number	Nation	Position	Name	Premier League		Russian Cup		Europa League		Total	
Number	Nation	Position	Name	Yellow card	Red card	Yellow card	Red card	Yellow card	Red card	Yellow card	Red card
2	(Russia)	DF	Aleksandr Anyukov	2	0	0	0	2	0	4	0
6	(Serbia)	DF	Branislav Ivanović	3	0	1	0	1	0	5	0
7	(Iran)	FW	Sardar Azmoun	2	0	0	0	1	0	3	0
8	(Argentina)	MF	Matías Kranevitter	2	0	0	0	0	0	2	0
10	(Italy)	MF	Claudio Marchisio	1	0	0	0	1	0	2	0
11	(Argentina)	FW	Sebastián Driussi	4	1	0	0	0	0	4	1
13	(Portugal)	DF	Luís Neto	5	0	1	0	3	0	9	0
14	(Russia)	MF	Daler Kuzyayev	5	1	0	0	1	0	6	1
15	(Russia)	DF	Elmir Nabiullin	3	0	0	0	2	0	5	0
16	(Ecuador)	MF	Christian Noboa	0	0	0	0	1	0	1	0
17	(Russia)	MF	Oleg Shatov	1	0	0	0	1	0	2	0
18	(Russia)	MF	Yuri Zhirkov	3	0	0	0	0	0	3	0
19	(Russia)	DF	Igor Smolnikov	5	0	0	0	2	0	7	0
20	(Slovakia)	MF	Róbert Mak	0	0	0	0	1	0	1	0
21	(Russia)	MF	Aleksandr Yerokhin	3	0	0	0	2	0	5	0
22	(Russia)	FW	Artem Dzyuba	2	0	0	0	1	0	3	0
24	(Italy)	MF	Emiliano Rigoni	4	0	0	0	0	0	4	0
25	(Colombia)	MF	Wílmar Barrios	4	0	0	0	2	0	6	0
27	(Russia)	MF	Magomed Ozdoyev	2	0	0	0	1	0	3	0
29	(Russia)	FW	Anton Zabolotny	1	0	1	0	0	0	2	0
30	(Argentina)	DF	Emanuel Mammana	2	0	1	0	0	0	3	0
33	(Brazil)	MF	Hernani	2	0	0	0	3	0	5	0
44	(Ukraine)	DF	Yaroslav Rakitskiy	3	0	0	0	1	0	4	0
99	(Russia)	GK	Andrey Lunyov	1	0	0	0	1	0	2	0
Players away on loan:
23	(Slovenia)	DF	Miha Mevlja	1	0	0	0	1	0	2	0
Players who left Zenit St.Petersburg during the season:
5	(Argentina)	MF	Leandro Paredes	8	1	0	0	3	1	10	2
			TOTALS	69	3	4	0	31	1	104	4
