= Maksim Shvyatsow =

Belarusian footballer

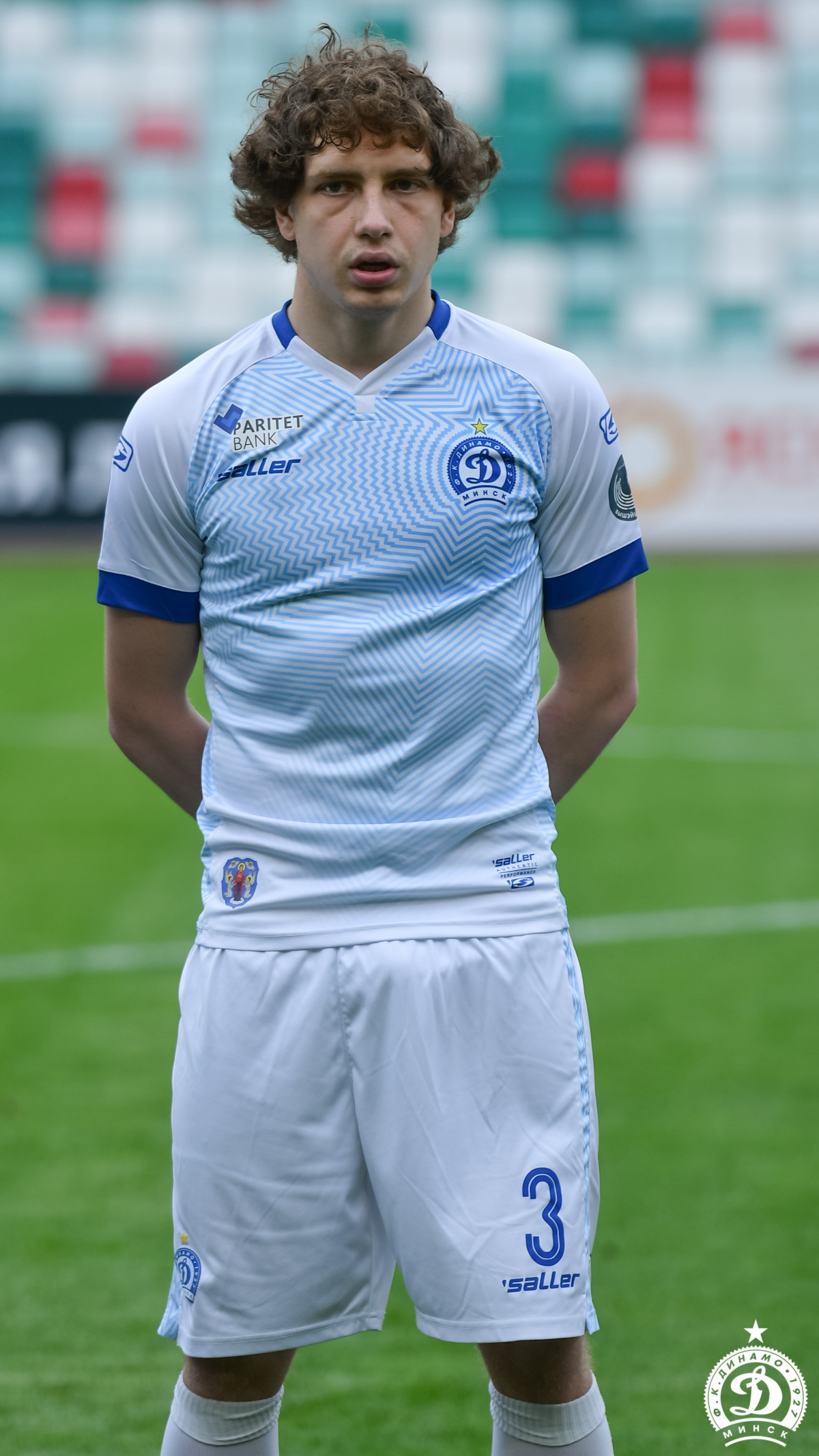
- Shvyatsow with Dinamo Minsk in 2020

Personal information
- Date of birth: 2 April 1998 (age 28)
- Place of birth: Minsk, Belarus
- Height: 1.80 m (5 ft 11 in)
- Position: Centre-back

Team information
- Current team: Dinamo Minsk
- Number: 3

Youth career
- 2013–2016: Dinamo Minsk

Senior career*
Years	Team	Apps	(Gls)
2015–2024	Dinamo Minsk	152	(1)
2024–2025	Rotor Volgograd	32	(0)
2026–	Dinamo Minsk	7	(0)

International career^{‡}
2014–2015	Belarus U17	6	(0)
2016–2017	Belarus U19	6	(0)
2017–2020	Belarus U21	13	(0)
2020–2022	Belarus	12	(0)
- * Club domestic league appearances and goals as of 4 July 2026 ‡ National team caps and goals as of 20 November 2022

Maksim Shvyatsow (Belarusian: Максім Швяцоў; Russian: Максим Швецов; born 2 April 1998) is a Belarusian professional footballer who plays as a defender for Dinamo Minsk and the Belarus national team.

He has also appeared for the national U17, U19 and U21 teams.
