= 2019 Match Premier Cup =

Friendly association football tournament played in the Qatar

Tournament details
- Host country: Qatar
- Dates: January 21–29
- Teams: 4 (from 1 confederation)
- Venue: 1 (in 1 host city)

Final positions
- Champions: Spartak Moscow (1st title)

Tournament statistics
- Matches played: 6
- Goals scored: 22 (3.67 per match)
- Top scorer(s): (Cape Verde) Zé Luís (Russia) Denis Glushakov (Russia) Denis Terentyev (2 goals each)

The 2019 Match Premier Cup was the first edition of Match Premier Cup, a friendly association football tournament played in the Qatar.

== Teams ==
Nation	Team	Location	Confederation	League
Russia	Spartak Moscow	Moscow	UEFA	Russian Premier League
Russia	Rostov	Rostov-on-Don	UEFA	Russian Premier League
Russia	Lokomotiv Moscow	Moscow	UEFA	Russian Premier League
Russia	Zenit Saint Petersburg	Saint Petersburg	UEFA	Russian Premier League

== Standings ==
Pos	Team	Pld	W	PW	PL	L	GF	GA	GD	Pts	Final result
1	(Russia) Spartak Moscow (C)	3	3	0	0	0	8	2	+6	9	Match Premier Cup winners
2	(Russia) Lokomotiv Moscow	3	1	1	0	1	4	6	−2	5	
3	(Russia) Zenit Saint Petersburg	3	1	0	0	2	7	5	+2	3	
4	(Russia) Rostov	3	0	0	1	2	2	8	−6	1	

Source: Match Premier Cup
Rules for classification: 1) Points; 2) Wins; 3) Goal differential; 4) Goals scored; 5) Head-to-head result; 6) Disciplinary points.
(C) Champion

== Matches ==
January 21, 2019
19:00

Spartak Moscow (Russia)	2–1	(Russia) Rostov
Luiz Adriano 58' (pen.); Glushakov 90'	Report	Kjartansson 40'

Aspire Dome, Doha

January 22, 2019
19:00

Zenit Saint Petersburg (Russia)	1–3	(Russia) Lokomotiv Moscow
Rigoni 82'	Report	Smolov 35'; An. Miranchuk 37'; Mironov 51'

Aspire Dome, Doha

January 25, 2019
13:00

Zenit Saint Petersburg (Russia)	0–3	(Russia) Spartak Moscow
		Melkadze 28'; Glushakov 29'; Luiz Adriano 73'

Aspire Dome, Doha

January 25, 2019
19:00

Rostov (Russia)	1–1	(Russia) Lokomotiv Moscow
Kjartansson 56'		Barinov 49'
Penalties
Sigurðsson (penalty missed); Eremenko (penalty scored); Osinov (penalty scored); Ionov (penalty scored); Hadžikadunić (penalty missed)	3–4	Eder (penalty missed); Zhemaletdinov (penalty scored); Barinov (penalty scored); Tugarev (penalty scored); Höwedes (penalty scored)

Aspire Dome, Doha

January 28, 2019
13:00

Rostov (Russia)	0–5	(Russia) Zenit Saint Petersburg
		Kuzyayev 40'; Dzyuba 53'; Shatov 60'; Terentyev 86', 88'

Aspire Dome, Doha

January 29, 2019
19:00

Spartak Moscow (Russia)	4–0	(Russia) Lokomotiv Moscow
Ayrton Lucas 1'; Lomovitsky 31'; Zé Luís 84', 86'

Aspire Dome, Doha
