= Artyom Shchadin =

Russian footballer

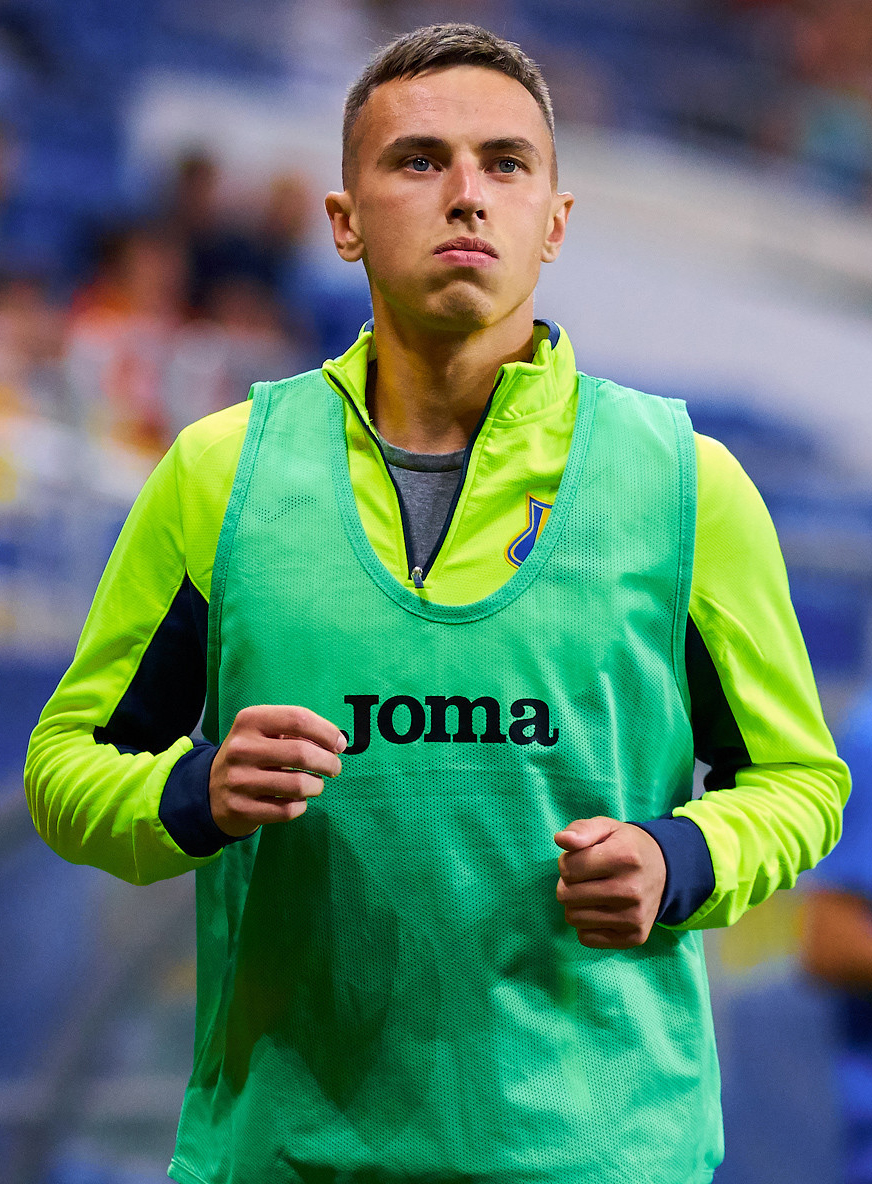
- Shchadin with Rostov in 2018

Personal information
- Full name: Artyom Olegovich Shchadin
- Date of birth: 1 November 1992 (age 34)
- Place of birth: Yaroslavl, Russia
- Height: 1.75 m (5 ft 9 in)
- Position: Midfielder

Youth career
- 1998–2010: Shinnik Yaroslavl

Senior career*
Years	Team	Apps	(Gls)
2011–2015	Shinnik Yaroslavl	71	(1)
2016	Torpedo Armavir	14	(1)
2016–2018	Kuban Krasnodar	17	(0)
2017–2018	→ Shinnik Yaroslavl (loan)	36	(1)
2018–2019	Rostov	6	(0)
2019	Torpedo-BelAZ Zhodino	9	(1)
2020	Nizhny Novgorod	2	(0)
2020–2022	Shinnik Yaroslavl	36	(1)
2024–2025	Naftan Novopolotsk	33	(0)
- * Club domestic league appearances and goals as of 10 July 2025

Artyom Olegovich Shchadin (Russian: Артём Олегович Щадин; born 1 November 1992) is a Russian professional football player.
