= Denis Terentyev =

Russian footballer

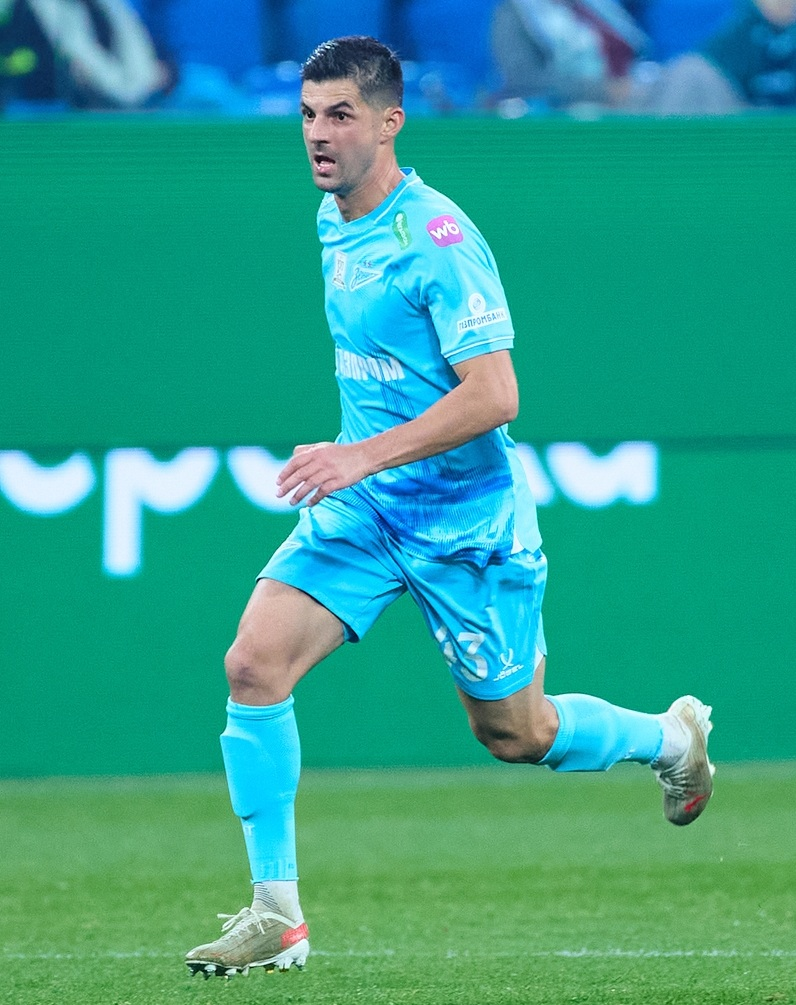
- Terentyev with Zenit in 2025

Personal information
- Full name: Denis Sergeyevich Terentyev
- Date of birth: 13 August 1992 (age 34)
- Place of birth: Saint Petersburg, Russia
- Height: 1.81 m (5 ft 11 in)
- Position: Right-back

Team information
- Current team: Zenit Saint Petersburg
- Number: 43

Youth career
- 1999–2012: Zenit Saint Petersburg
- 2013–2014: Tom Tomsk

Senior career*
| Years | Team | Apps | (Gls) |
| 2012–2015 | Zenit Saint Petersburg | 1 | (0) |
| 2012–2014 | → Tom Tomsk (loan) | 16 | (1) |
| 2014 | → Zenit-2 Saint Petersburg | 17 | (3) |
| 2015 | → Tom Tomsk (loan) | 9 | (1) |
| 2015–2017 | Rostov | 38 | (0) |
| 2017–2020 | Zenit Saint Petersburg | 8 | (0) |
| 2018–2019 | → Zenit-2 Saint Petersburg | 20 | (0) |
| 2019–2020 | → Ufa (loan) | 10 | (1) |
| 2020–2024 | Rostov | 70 | (1) |
| 2024–2025 | Baltika Kaliningrad | 17 | (0) |
| 2025– | Zenit Saint Petersburg | 0 | (0) |
| 2025– | → Zenit-2 Saint Petersburg | 30 | (0) |

International career
| 2010 | Russia U-18 | 7 | (0) |
| 2011 | Russia U-19 | 4 | (0) |
- * Club domestic league appearances and goals as of 17 October 2026

Denis Sergeyevich Terentyev (Russian: Дени́с Серге́евич Тере́нтьев; born 13 August 1992) is a Russian professional football player who plays as a right-back for Zenit Saint Petersburg.

== Club career ==
He made his Russian Premier League debut for Zenit St. Petersburg on 13 May 2012 in a game against Anzhi Makhachkala.

On 5 June 2017, he returned from Rostov to Zenit St. Petersburg, signing a 3-year contract.

On 2 September 2019, he extended his Zenit contract for another year and was loaned to Ufa for the remainder of the 2019–20 season.

On 15 October 2020 he returned to Rostov.

On 27 May 2024, Terentyev left Rostov as his contract expired.

On 16 July 2024, Terentyev signed a one-year contract with Baltika Kaliningrad, with an option to extend.

== Career statistics ==
As of match played 14 June 2026

Appearances and goals by club, season and competition
| Club | Season | League | | | Cup | | Continental | | Other | | Total | |
| Club | Season | Division | Apps | Goals | Apps | Goals | Apps | Goals | Apps | Goals | Apps | Goals |
|---|---|---|---|---|---|---|---|---|---|---|---|---|
| Zenit St. Petersburg | 2011–12 | Russian Premier League | 1 | 0 | 0 | 0 | 0 | 0 | 0 | 0 | 1 | 0 |
| Zenit St. Petersburg | Total | | 1 | 0 | 0 | 0 | 0 | 0 | 0 | 0 | 0 | 0 |
| Tom Tomsk (loan) | 2012–13 | Russian First League | 15 | 1 | 0 | 0 | – | | – | | 15 | 1 |
| Tom Tomsk (loan) | 2013–14 | Russian Premier League | 1 | 0 | 1 | 0 | – | | 1 (Note: Appearance in relegation play-offs) | 0 | 3 | 0 |
| Tom Tomsk (loan) | Total | | 16 | 1 | 1 | 0 | 0 | 0 | 1 | 0 | 18 | 1 |
| Zenit-2 St. Petersburg | 2014–15 | Russian Second League | 17 | 3 | – | | – | | – | | 17 | 3 |
| Tom Tomsk (loan) | 2014–15 | Russian First League | 9 | 1 | 0 | 0 | – | | 7 (Note: Two appearances in the promotion play-offs, five appearances, one goal in the FNL Cup) | 1 | 16 | 2 |
| Rostov | 2015–16 | Russian Premier League | 14 | 0 | 0 | 0 | – | | – | | 14 | 0 |
| Rostov | 2016–17 | Russian Premier League | 24 | 0 | 0 | 0 | 12 (Note: Nine appearances in the UEFA Champions League, three appearances in the UEFA Europa League) | 0 | – | | 36 | 0 |
| Rostov | Total | | 38 | 0 | 0 | 0 | 12 | 0 | 0 | 0 | 67 | 0 |
| Zenit St. Petersburg | 2017–18 | Russian Premier League | 4 | 0 | 1 | 0 | 3 (Note: Appearances in the UEFA Europa League) | 0 | – | | 8 | 0 |
| Zenit St. Petersburg | 2018–19 | Russian Premier League | 1 | 0 | 0 | 0 | 0 | 0 | – | | 1 | 0 |
| Zenit St. Petersburg | 2019–20 | Russian Premier League | 2 | 0 | 0 | 0 | 0 | 0 | 0 | 0 | 2 | 0 |
| Zenit St. Petersburg | 2020–21 | Russian Premier League | 1 | 0 | 0 | 0 | 0 | 0 | 0 | 0 | 1 | 0 |
| Zenit St. Petersburg | Total | | 8 | 0 | 1 | 0 | 3 | 0 | 0 | 0 | 12 | 0 |
| Zenit-2 St. Petersburg | 2018–19 | Russian First League | 20 | 0 | – | | – | | – | | 20 | 0 |
| Ufa (loan) | 2019–20 | Russian Premier League | 10 | 1 | 2 | 0 | – | | – | | 12 | 1 |
| Rostov | 2020–21 | Russian Premier League | 15 | 0 | 0 | 0 | 0 | 0 | – | | 15 | 0 |
| Rostov | 2021–22 | Russian Premier League | 25 | 1 | 1 | 0 | – | | – | | 26 | 1 |
| Rostov | 2022–23 | Russian Premier League | 16 | 0 | 5 | 0 | – | | – | | 21 | 0 |
| Rostov | 2023–24 | Russian Premier League | 14 | 0 | 9 | 1 | – | | – | | 23 | 1 |
| Rostov | Total | | 70 | 1 | 15 | 1 | 0 | 0 | 0 | 0 | 85 | 2 |
| Baltika Kaliningrad | 2024–25 | Russian First League | 17 | 0 | 3 | 0 | – | | – | | 20 | 0 |
| Zenit-2 St. Petersburg | 2025 | Russian Second League | 13 | 0 | – | | – | | – | | 13 | 0 |
| Zenit-2 St. Petersburg | 2025–26 | Russian Second League A | 8 | 0 | – | | – | | – | | 8 | 0 |
| Zenit-2 St. Petersburg | Total | | 21 | 0 | 0 | 0 | 0 | 0 | 0 | 0 | 21 | 0 |
| Zenit St. Petersburg | 2025–26 | Russian Premier League | 0 | 0 | 1 | 0 | – | | – | | 1 | 0 |
| Career total | | | 227 | 7 | 23 | 1 | 15 | 0 | 8 | 1 | 273 | 9 |

== Honours ==
Zenit Saint Petersburg

- Russian Premier League: 2011–12, 2018–19

Baltika Kaliningrad

- Russian First League: 2024–25

Zenit-2 Saint Petersburg

- Russian Second League Division B: 2025
- Russian Second League Division A Silver Group: 2026
