= Miha Mevlja =

Slovenian footballer (born 1990)

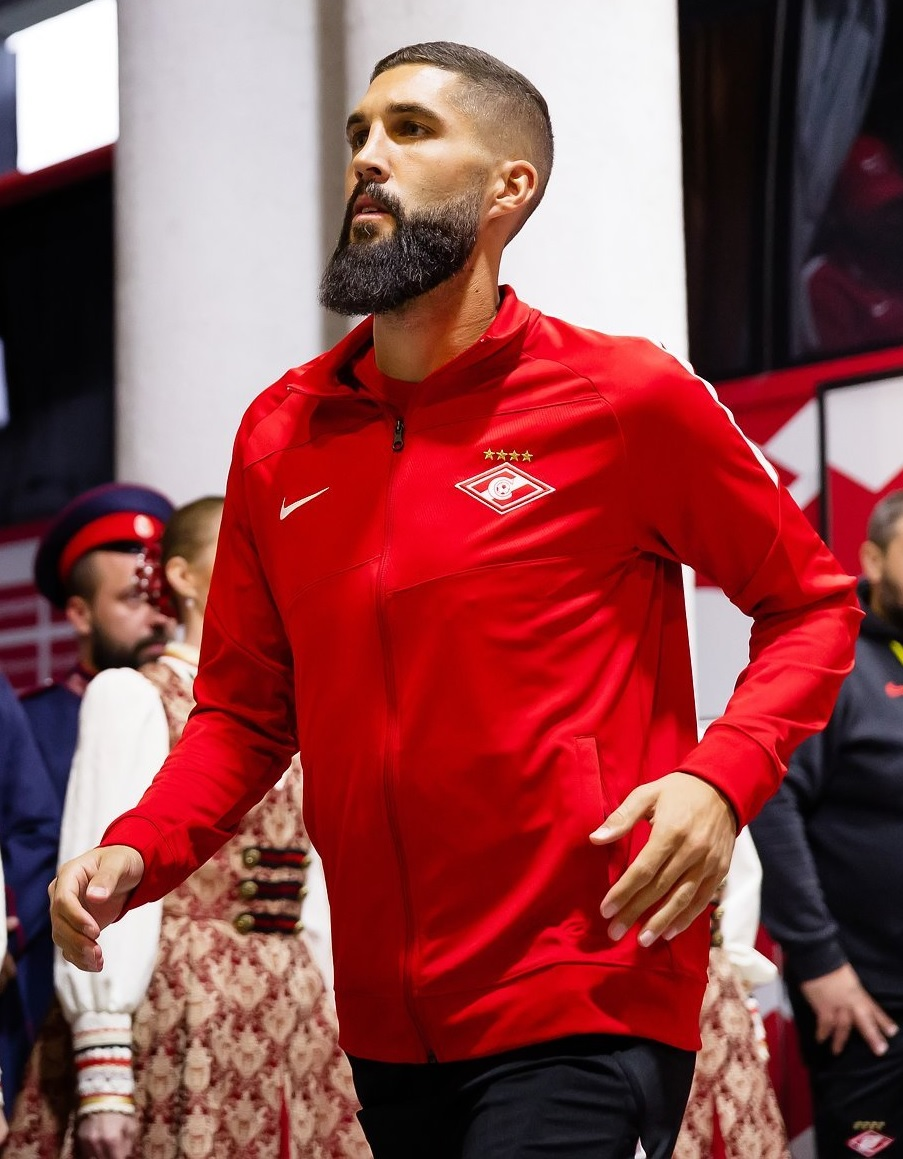
- Mevlja with Spartak Moscow in 2022

Personal information
- Date of birth: 12 June 1990 (age 36)
- Place of birth: Ljubljana, SR Slovenia, SFR Yugoslavia
- Height: 1.90 m (6 ft 3 in)
- Position: Defender

Youth career
- –2009: Gorica

Senior career*
Years	Team	Apps	(Gls)
2009–2013	Gorica	109	(5)
2010	→ Brda (loan)	2	(0)
2013–2014	Lausanne-Sport	30	(1)
2014–2015	Bnei Sakhnin	22	(0)
2015–2016	Dinamo București	41	(0)
2016–2017	Rostov	29	(1)
2017–2019	Zenit St. Petersburg	24	(0)
2019	→ Rostov (loan)	7	(1)
2019–2021	Sochi	48	(4)
2021–2022	Alanyaspor	14	(0)
2022–2023	Spartak Moscow	4	(0)

International career
2009	Slovenia U19 (Note: Official competitive UEFA matches only.)	5	(0)
2010–2012	Slovenia U21	13	(0)
2016–2022	Slovenia	50	(2)
- * Club domestic league appearances and goals

Miha Mevlja (born 12 June 1990) is a Slovenian former professional footballer who played as a centre-back.

== Club career ==
Mevlja began his career with Gorica, where he eventually spent four years with the first-team. In the summer of 2013 Mevlja joined Lausanne-Sport on a free transfer, his first club abroad, and competed in the Swiss Super League after signing a two-year contract.

On 31 August 2017, Mevlja signed a four-year contract with Zenit St. Petersburg. On 21 February 2019, he returned to Rostov on loan.

On 2 September 2019, he signed a two-year contract with PFC Sochi.

On 19 July 2021, he joined Turkish club Alanyaspor on a three-year contract.

On 8 September 2022, Mevlja returned to Russia and signed with Spartak Moscow for one season, with an option to extend for one more. On 18 January 2023, his contract with Spartak was terminated by mutual consent.

== International career ==
During his spell with Dinamo București, he received his first call-up for the Slovenia national team and made his debut on 5 June 2016 in a friendly game against Turkey.

== Personal life ==
He has a twin brother named Nejc, who also played football professionally as a centre-back.

== Career statistics ==
=== Club ===
Appearances and goals by club, season and competition
Club	Season	League			National cup		Continental		Other		Total	
Club	Season	Division	Apps	Goals	Apps	Goals	Apps	Goals	Apps	Goals	Apps	Goals
Gorica	2009–10	Slovenian PrvaLiga	14	1	2	0	—		—		16	1
Gorica	2010–11	Slovenian PrvaLiga	34	3	3	0	2 (Note: Appearance(s) in UEFA Europa League)	0	—		39	3
Gorica	2011–12	Slovenian PrvaLiga	28	1	3	0	—		—		31	1
Gorica	2012–13	Slovenian PrvaLiga	33	0	3	0	—		—		36	0
Gorica	Total		109	5	11	0	2	0	0	0	122	5
Lausanne-Sport	2013–14	Swiss Super League	30	1	4	0	—		—		34	1
Bnei Sakhnin	2014–15	Israeli Premier League	22	0	0	0	—		—		22	0
Dinamo București	2015–16	Liga I	35	0	6	0	—		4 (Note: Appearance(s) in Cupa Ligii)	0	45	0
Dinamo București	2016–17	Liga I	6	0	0	0	—		1	0	7	0
Dinamo București	Total		41	0	6	0	0	0	5	0	52	0
Rostov	2016–17	Russian Premier League	21	0	0	0	10 (Note: Six appearances in UEFA Champions League, four appearances and one goal in UEFA Europa League)	1	—		31	1
Rostov	2017–18	Russian Premier League	8	1	—		—		—		8	1
Rostov	Total		29	1	0	0	10	1	0	0	39	2
Zenit Saint Petersburg	2017–18	Russian Premier League	18	0	1	0	10	0	—		29	0
Zenit Saint Petersburg	2018–19	Russian Premier League	6	0	1	0	7	1	—		14	1
Zenit Saint Petersburg	2019–20	Russian Premier League	0	0	—		—		0	0	0	0
Zenit Saint Petersburg	Total		24	0	2	0	17	1	0	0	43	1
Rostov	2018–19	Russian Premier League	7	1	1	0	—		—		8	1
Sochi	2019–20	Russian Premier League	19	1	1	0	—		—		20	1
Sochi	2020–21	Russian Premier League	29	3	2	0	—		—		31	3
Sochi	Total		48	4	3	0	—		—		51	4
Alanyaspor	2021–22	Süper Lig	14	0	2	0	—		—		16	0
Alanyaspor	2022–23	Süper Lig	0	0	—		—		—		0	0
Alanyaspor	Total		14	0	2	0	—		—		16	0
Spartak Moscow	2022–23	Russian Premier League	4	0	3	0	—		—		7	0
Career total			328	12	32	0	29	2	5	0	394	14

=== International ===
Scores and results list Slovenia's goal tally first, score column indicates score after each Mevlja goal.

List of international goals scored by Miha Mevlja
No.	Date	Venue	Cap	Opponent	Score	Result	Competition
1	14 November 2016	Stadion Miejski, Wrocław, Poland	4	Poland	1–0	1–1	Friendly
2	11 November 2021	Anton Malatinský Stadium, Trnava, Slovakia	44	Slovakia	2–1	2–2	2022 FIFA World Cup qualification
