= Denis Glushakov =

Russian footballer (born 1987)

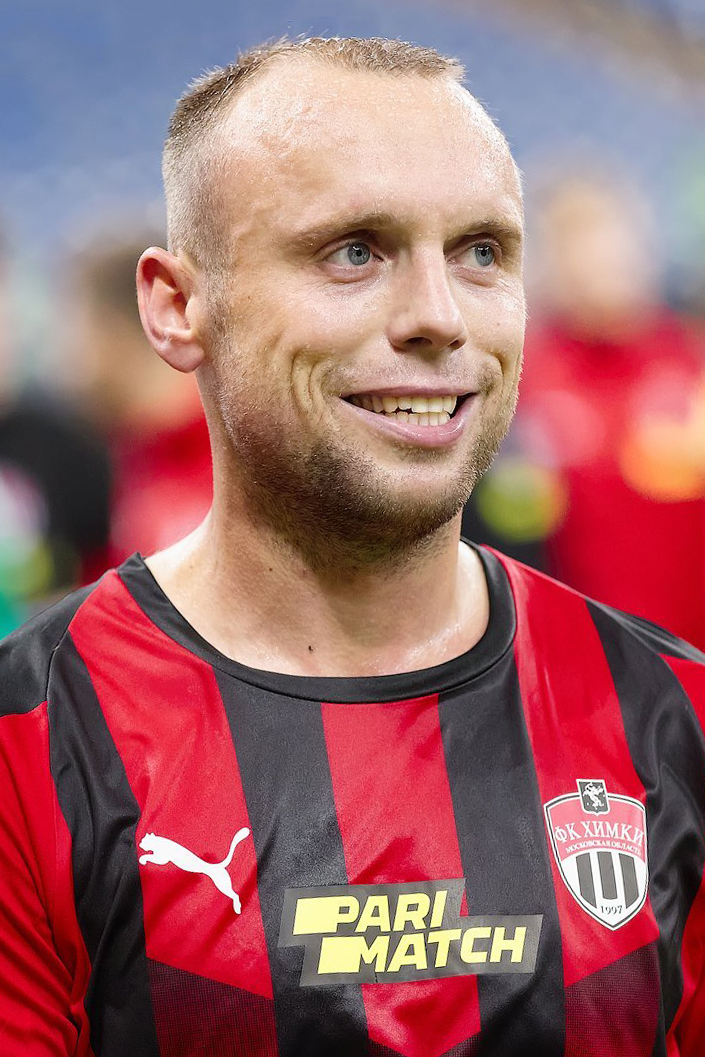
- Glushakov with Khimki in 2020

Personal information
- Full name: Denis Borisovich Glushakov
- Date of birth: 27 January 1987 (age 39)
- Place of birth: Millerovo, Russian SFSR
- Height: 1.81 m (5 ft 11 in)
- Position: Defensive midfielder

Youth career
- 1998–1999: CSKA Moscow
- 1999–2005: Nika Moscow

Senior career*
Years	Team	Apps	(Gls)
2005	Nika Moscow	13	(0)
2005–2013	Lokomotiv Moscow	142	(20)
2006	→ SKA Rostov-on-Don (loan)	16	(6)
2007	→ Zvezda Irkutsk (loan)	34	(8)
2013–2019	Spartak Moscow	147	(22)
2019–2020	Akhmat Grozny	24	(4)
2020–2023	Khimki	56	(13)
2023	Pari NN	7	(1)
2023	Spartak Kostroma	7	(0)
2024	Urartu	10	(0)
2024–2025	Khimki	5	(0)
2025	SKA Rostov		

International career
2008	Russia U21	3	(0)
2011–2018	Russia	57	(5)
- * Club domestic league appearances and goals

Denis Borisovich Glushakov (Russian: Дени́с Бори́сович Глушако́в; born 27 January 1987) is a Russian former international footballer who played as a defensive midfielder and box-to-box midfielder.

== Career ==
=== Club ===
From 2005 to 2013, Glushakov played for Lokomotiv Moscow.

He then joined Spartak Moscow, of which he ultimately became Captain. He was a key figure in its 2016-17 victory in the Russian Premier League, assisting and scoring a number of crucial goals. On 19 June 2019, Glushakov was released from his Spartak contract by mutual consent. This was after a controversy, during which fans accused him of supporting the removal of manager Massimo Carrera, who was the first Spartak manager to win the Russian Premier League in over a decade.

On 29 June 2019, Glushakov signed a one-year contract, with the option of a second, with Akhmat Grozny. On 4 August 2020, Glushakov announced that he left Akhmat.

On 1 October 2020, he signed with Khimki. On 8 July 2021, he extended his contract the end of the 2023–24 season, and he remained a key figure in the squad On 10 January 2023, Glushakov's contract with Khimki was terminated by mutual consent.

On 10 February 2023, Glushakov signed with Russian Premier League club Pari NN until the end of the season, with an option to extend. He left Pari at the end of the season.

On 20 September 2023, Glushakov joined Spartak Kostroma in the third-tier Russian Second League. He left Spartak Kostroma by mutual consent on 30 January 2024.

On 26 February 2024, Glushakov signed for Armenian Premier League club Urartu. On 26 May 2024, Urartu announced that Glushakov had left the club at the end of his contract.

On 27 June 2024, Glushakov returned to Khimki. Glushakov left Khimki on 1 February 2025.

Glushakov announced his retirement from playing in September 2025.

=== International ===
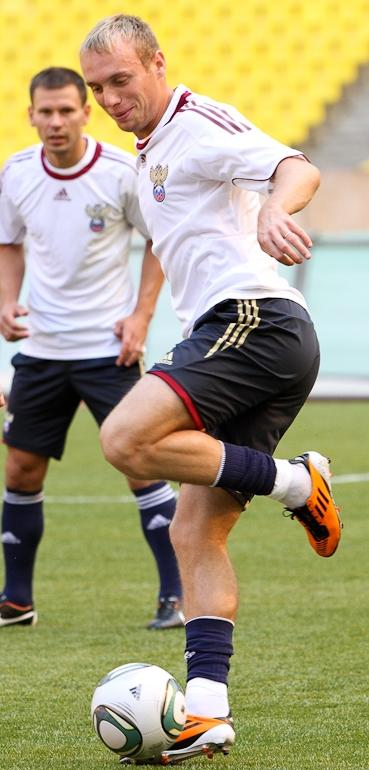
Glushakov with the Russia national football team in 2011

In March 2011, he was for the first time called up to the Russia national football team. He made his national team debut on 29 March 2011 in a friendly against Qatar. On 11 October 2011 he scored his first goal for Russia in a Euro 2012 qualifier against Andorra.

He was confirmed for the finalized UEFA Euro 2012 squad on 25 May 2012. He was left on the bench in the first two games, before starting the third group game against Greece as Russia was eliminated at group stage.

On 2 June 2014, he was included in the Russia's 2014 FIFA World Cup squad. He started all 3 games that Russia played at the tournament.

On 15 June 2016, Glushakov scored with a header in a 2–1 defeat against Slovakia at Euro 2016. He appeared as a substitute in the first two group games before starting against Wales.

On 11 May 2018, he was included in Russia's extended 2018 FIFA World Cup squad as a back-up. He was not included in the finalized World Cup squad.

== Personal life ==
His uncle Valeri Glushakov was a professional footballer as well.

== Career statistics ==
=== Club ===
As of match played 28 August 2024

Appearances and goals by club, season and competition
Club	Season	League			Cup		Europe		Other		Total	
Club	Season	Division	Apps	Goals	Apps	Goals	Apps	Goals	Apps	Goals	Apps	Goals
Nika Moscow	2005	Russian Second League	13	0	2	0	—		—		15	0
SKA Rostov-on-Don	2006	Russian Second League	16	6	—		—		—		16	6
Zvezda Irkutsk	2007	Russian First League	34	8	1	0	—		—		35	8
Lokomotiv Moscow	2008	Russian Premier League	23	4	2	0	—		—		25	4
Lokomotiv Moscow	2009	Russian Premier League	27	3	1	0	—		—		28	3
Lokomotiv Moscow	2010	Russian Premier League	28	1	1	0	1 (Note: Appearances in the UEFA Europa League)	0	—		30	1
Lokomotiv Moscow	2011–12	Russian Premier League	37	11	3	0	10	3	—		50	14
Lokomotiv Moscow	2012–13	Russian Premier League	27	1	1	0	—		—		28	1
Lokomotiv Moscow	Total		142	20	8	0	11	3	0	0	161	23
Spartak Moscow	2013–14	Russian Premier League	28	1	2	0	1	0	—		31	1
Spartak Moscow	2014–15	Russian Premier League	27	2	1	0	—		—		28	2
Spartak Moscow	2015–16	Russian Premier League	27	4	2	0	—		—		29	4
Spartak Moscow	2016–17	Russian Premier League	25	8	0	0	2	0	—		27	8
Spartak Moscow	2017–18	Russian Premier League	22	4	3	0	7 (Note: Five appearances, one goal in the UEFA Champions League, two appearances in the UEFA Europa League)	1	1 (Note: Appearance in the Russian Super Cup)	0	33	5
Spartak Moscow	2018–19	Russian Premier League	18	3	3	0	4 (Note: One appearance in the UEFA Champions League, three appearances in the UEFA Europa League)	0	—		25	3
Spartak Moscow	Total		147	22	11	0	14	1	1	0	173	23
Akhmat Grozny	2019–20	Russian Premier League	24	4	3	2	—		—		27	6
Khimki	2020–21	Russian Premier League	15	3	2	0	—		—		17	3
Khimki	2021–22	Russian Premier League	27	10	2	0	—		2 (Note: Appearances in the relegation play-offs)	1	31	11
Khimki	2022–23	Russian Premier League	14	0	5	1	—		—		19	1
Khimki	Total		56	13	9	1	0	0	2	1	67	15
Pari NN	2022–23	Russian Premier League	7	1	2	0	—		0	0	9	1
Spartak Kostroma	2023–24	Russian Second League A	7	0	—		—		—		7	0
Urartu	2023–24	Armenian Premier League	10	0	2	0	—		—		12	0
Khimki	2024–25	Russian Premier League	5	0	3	0	—		—		8	0
Career total			461	74	41	3	25	4	3	1	530	82

=== International ===
As of match played 19 November 2018

Russia national team
Year	Apps	Goals
2011	7	1
2012	9	0
2013	8	2
2014	11	0
2015	5	0
2016	8	2
2017	8	0
2018	1	0
Total	57	5

=== International goals ===
No.	Date	Venue	Cap	Opponent	Score	Result	Competition
1	11 October 2011	Luzhniki Stadium, Moscow, Russia	6	Andorra	5–0	6–0	UEFA Euro 2012 qualification
2	10 September 2013	Petrovsky Stadium, Saint Petersburg, Russia	20	Israel	3–0	3–1	2014 FIFA World Cup qualification
3	11 October 2013	Stade Josy Barthel, Luxembourg, Luxembourg	21	Luxembourg	3–0	4–0	2014 FIFA World Cup qualification
4	26 March 2016	Otkrytiye Arena, Moscow, Russia	41	Lithuania	3–0	3–0	Friendly
5	15 June 2016	Stade Pierre-Mauroy, Villeneuve-d'Ascq, France	45	Slovakia	1–2	1–2	UEFA Euro 2016

== Honours ==
=== Club ===
Spartak Moscow

- Russian Premier League: 2016-17
- Russian Super Cup: 2017
- Match Premier Cup: 2019

=== Individual ===
- List of 33 top players of the Russian league: 2013/14.
