= List of Russian football transfers summer 2015 =

This is a list of Russian football transfers in the 2015 summer transfer window by club. Only clubs of the 2015–16 Russian Premier League are included. The transfers that were completed after the 2014–15 winter transfer window, closed on 27 February 2015, are included here.

== Russian Premier League 2015–16 ==
=== Amkar Perm ===
In: Note: Flags indicate national team as defined under FIFA eligibility rules; some limited exceptions apply. Players may hold more than one non-FIFA nationality.

No.	Pos.	Nation	Player
4	DF	RUS	Nikolai Zaytsev (from Tosno)
11	FW	NOR	Chuma Anene (from (North Macedonia) Rabotnički)
14	DF	RUS	Georgi Dzhikiya (from Khimik Dzerzhinsk)
20	MF	RUS	Pavel Komolov (from (Lithuania) Žalgiris Vilnius, previously on loan at (Poland) GKS Bełchatów)
33	MF	SRB	Branko Jovičić (from (Austria) LASK Linz, previously on loan)
34	DF	RUS	Mikhail Kondrashov
36	MF	RUS	Aleksandr Pantsyrev (end of loan to Neftekhimik Nizhnekamsk)
37	DF	RUS	Ilya Pushkaryov
40	MF	RUS	Ivan Belikov
41	FW	RUS	Aleksandr Melekhov
42	MF	RUS	Vsevolod Kozhin
43	MF	NGA	Izunna Uzochukwu (from (Denmark) Midtjylland)
44	MF	RUS	Aleksei Orlov (free agent, with Krasnodar until February 2015)
45	DF	RUS	Andrei Pridyuk (end of loan to Tambov)
46	MF	RUS	Georgi Yenev
47	MF	RUS	Daniil Frentsel
51	DF	RUS	Nikita Romaschenko (from Torpedo Moscow)
55	DF	RUS	Daniil Petrov
63	GK	RUS	Daniil Arzhevitin
67	MF	RUS	Roman Bulak
68	MF	RUS	Timofey Krayev
70	FW	RUS	Anton Googe (own academy, April 2015)
73	MF	RUS	Nikolai Smetskoy
74	DF	RUS	Gleb Burkov
77	FW	RUS	Aleksandr Salugin (from Torpedo Moscow)

Out: Note: Flags indicate national team as defined under FIFA eligibility rules; some limited exceptions apply. Players may hold more than one non-FIFA nationality.

No.	Pos.	Nation	Player
4	MF	RUS	Maksim Batov (to Rubin Kazan)
6	DF	RUS	Aleksei Nikitin (to Ufa)
8	MF	RUS	Igor Kireyev (end of loan from Rostov)
10	FW	MDA	Igor Picușceac (to (Moldova) Sheriff Tiraspol)
11	FW	MKD	Marko Simonovski (to (Croatia) RNK Split)
14	DF	BUL	Zahari Sirakov (retired)
17	MF	RUS	David Dzakhov (contract expired)
19	MF	RUS	Aleksandr Kolomeytsev (to Lokomotiv Moscow)
26	FW	SVK	Martin Jakubko (to (Slovakia) MFK Ružomberok)
27	FW	RUS	Vladislav Shpitalny
30	DF	RUS	Soslan Takazov (to Tyumen)
35	MF	RUS	Aykaz Zilabyan
38	MF	RUS	Vasili Aleynikov (on loan to Pskov-747 Pskov)
40	DF	RUS	Vladimir Troshev
43	FW	RUS	Yevgeni Tyukalov (to (Portugal) Leiria)
44	DF	RUS	Nikita Permyakov
46	MF	RUS	Aleksandr Patrikeyev
51	DF	RUS	Dmitri Tyukalov
55	MF	RUS	Vladimir Pereverzev
61	FW	RUS	Nikita Goldobin
72	FW	RUS	Ivan Ivanchenko (to Lada-Togliatti)
73	MF	RUS	Dmitri Opachev (to Nosta Novotroitsk)
75	MF	RUS	Aleksei Serpokrylov (to Yevpatoria)
77	DF	RUS	Rafsan Gasymov
78	FW	RUS	Pavel Novykh
88	FW	RUS	Pavel Solomatin (end of loan from Dynamo Moscow)
92	MF	RUS	Valeri Kuznetsov (to Ural Sverdlovsk Oblast)
—	DF	POL	Damian Zbozień (to (Poland) Zagłębie Lubin, previously on loan at (Poland) GKS Bełchatów)

=== Anzhi Makhachkala ===
In: Note: Flags indicate national team as defined under FIFA eligibility rules; some limited exceptions apply. Players may hold more than one non-FIFA nationality.

No.	Pos.	Nation	Player
2	DF	RUS	Andrey Yeshchenko (end of loan to Kuban Krasnodar)
4	DF	SRB	Darko Lazić (from (Serbia) Red Star Belgrade)
5	DF	RUS	Aleksandr Zhirov (from Volgar Astrakhan)
6	MF	ARM	Karlen Mkrtchyan (from (Kazakhstan) Tobol Kostanay)
8	MF	NED	Lorenzo Ebecilio (from (Ukraine) Metalurg Donetsk, previously on loan to Mordovia Saransk)
9	FW	POR	Hugo Almeida (from Kuban Krasnodar)
10	MF	NGA	Lukman Haruna (on loan from (Ukraine) Dynamo Kyiv)
16	GK	RUS	Yury Shafinsky (from Torpedo Moscow)
18	MF	BLR	Ivan Mayewski (from (Poland) Zawisza Bydgoszcz)
28	FW	RUS	Serder Serderov (end of loan to Krylia Sovetov Samara)
33	GK	RUS	Sergei Pesyakov (on loan from Spartak Moscow)
37	MF	RUS	Batraz Khadartsev (from Tosno)
45	DF	RUS	Narula Dzharulayev (from Anzhi-2 Makhachkala)
47	MF	RUS	Tamirlan Dzhamalutdinov (from Anzhi-2 Makhachkala)
48	MF	RUS	Magomed Magomedov
49	MF	RUS	Yuri Kuzmin (from Anzhi-2 Makhachkala)
53	MF	RUS	Karim Girayev (from Anzhi-2 Makhachkala)
54	FW	RUS	Rashid Magomedov (from Anzhi-2 Makhachkala)
55	GK	RUS	Yevgeny Pomazan (end of loan to Kuban Krasnodar)
56	DF	RUS	Mikhail Reshetnyak (from Dolgoprudny)
58	DF	RUS	Magomed Elmurzayev
59	FW	RUS	Mariz Saidov (from Anzhi-2 Makhachkala)
61	FW	RUS	Anton Belov (from Sokol Saratov academy)
62	FW	RUS	Shakhban Gaydarov
63	MF	RUS	Dordzhi Sangadzhiyev (from Uralan Elista)
64	MF	RUS	Tamerlan Ramazanov
65	DF	RUS	Abubakar Ustarkhanov
67	MF	RUS	Alan Yarikbayev
68	MF	RUS	Goytemir Umarov
69	FW	RUS	Said Aliyev
71	GK	RUS	Mukharbek Burayev
73	MF	RUS	Chingiz Agabalayev
75	FW	RUS	Tagir Musalov (from Anzhi-2 Makhachkala)
77	DF	RUS	Georgi Tigiyev (from Torpedo Moscow)
78	MF	RUS	Timur Patakhov (from Anzhi-2 Makhachkala)

Out: Note: Flags indicate national team as defined under FIFA eligibility rules; some limited exceptions apply. Players may hold more than one non-FIFA nationality.

No.	Pos.	Nation	Player
1	GK	RUS	Aleksandr Krivoruchko (on loan to Tom Tomsk)
2	DF	RUS	Aleksei Aravin (to Tosno)
4	DF	RUS	Dmitry Aydov (to Arsenal Tula)
8	MF	RUS	Grigori Chirkin (to Tosno)
9	FW	RUS	Shamil Asildarov (released)
14	MF	MDA	Valeriu Ciupercă (on loan to Tom Tomsk)
18	MF	RUS	Roman Kontsedalov (to Energomash Belgorod)
19	DF	RUS	Pyotr Ten (end of loan from CSKA Moscow)
21	MF	RUS	Mikhail Komkov (to Tosno)
22	GK	RUS	Mikhail Kerzhakov (to Zenit Saint Petersburg)
24	DF	RUS	Sergei Miroshnichenko (to Torpedo Armavir)
28	MF	RUS	Maksim Andreyev (to Sokol Saratov)
44	DF	RUS	Murad Kurbanov (on loan to Khimik Dzerzhinsk)
60	MF	RUS	Magomed Muslimov
70	DF	RUS	Yuri Udunyan (on loan to Khimik Dzerzhinsk)
80	MF	RUS	Ismail Korgoloyev
95	FW	RUS	Magomed Mitrishev (end of loan from Terek Grozny)
—	DF	BRA	Ewerton (to (Portugal) Sporting CP, previously on loan)
—	DF	KGZ	Valery Kichin (to Tyumen, previously on loan)

=== CSKA Moscow ===
In: Note: Flags indicate national team as defined under FIFA eligibility rules; some limited exceptions apply. Players may hold more than one non-FIFA nationality.

No.	Pos.	Nation	Player
5	DF	RUS	Viktor Vasin (end of loan to Mordovia Saransk)
20	MF	RUS	Amir Natkho (from (Spain) Barcelona Juvenil A)
46	MF	RUS	Nikolai Dergachyov (end of loan to (Czech Republic) Dukla Prague)
51	MF	RUS	Aleksandr Ektov (from UOR #5 Yegoryevsk)
52	MF	RUS	Khetag Khosonov
59	DF	RUS	Roman Krivulkin
61	MF	RUS	Kirill Leonov
62	DF	SRB	Aleksandar Stanisavljević
63	FW	RUS	Fyodor Chalov
64	MF	RUS	Timur Pukhov
71	FW	RUS	Ilya Zuyev (from Saturn-2 Ramenskoye)
77	GK	RUS	Dmitri Gerasimov
78	DF	RUS	Ivan Maklakov
81	MF	RUS	Danil Neplyuyev (own academy, April 2015)
82	MF	RUS	Ivan Oleynikov (own academy, April 2015)
83	MF	RUS	Alan Koroyev (own academy, April 2015)
88	FW	CIV	Seydou Doumbia (on loan from (Italy) Roma)
89	MF	RUS	Konstantin Kuchayev (from UOR #5 Yegoryevsk)
96	MF	RUS	Renat Yusupov

Out: Note: Flags indicate national team as defined under FIFA eligibility rules; some limited exceptions apply. Players may hold more than one non-FIFA nationality.

No.	Pos.	Nation	Player
15	FW	RUS	Dmitri Yefremov (on loan to (Czech Republic) Slovan Liberec)
17	FW	SWE	Alibek Aliev (on loan to (Finland) Jaro)
26	MF	LBR	Sekou Oliseh (to (Qatar) Al-Gharafa)
36	DF	RUS	Vyacheslav Karavayev (on loan to (Czech Republic) Baumit Jablonec, previously on loan at (Czech Republic) Dukla Prague)
38	GK	RUS	Ivan Zlobin
47	DF	RUS	Pavel Kotov (to Neftekhimik Nizhnekamsk)
52	MF	RUS	Igor Drykov (released, April 2015)
77	FW	RUS	Dmitri Zhuravlyov
81	DF	RUS	Danil Neplyuyev
82	MF	RUS	Ivan Oleynikov
83	MF	RUS	Alan Koroyev
85	MF	CMR	Gaël Ondoua
86	MF	RUS	Elgyun Ulukhanov (to Krasnodar)
95	GK	RUS	Sergei Revyakin (to Torpedo Armavir)
97	FW	SWE	Carlos Strandberg (on loan to Ural Sverdlovsk Oblast)
98	MF	RUS	Svyatoslav Georgiyevsky (to Kuban Krasnodar)
99	MF	RUS	Maksim Martusevich (to (Serbia) Javor Ivanjica)
—	DF	RUS	Pyotr Ten (on loan to Tom Tomsk, previously on loan to Anzhi Makhachkala)
—	MF	RUS	Armen Ambartsumyan (on loan to Torpedo Armavir, previously on loan to Zenit Penza)
—	FW	RUS	Konstantin Bazelyuk (on loan to SKA-Energiya Khabarovsk, previously on loan to Torpedo Moscow)
—	FW	RUS	Vadim Larionov (to Novokuznetsk, previously on loan to Sibir-2 Novosibirsk)

=== Dynamo Moscow ===
In: Note: Flags indicate national team as defined under FIFA eligibility rules; some limited exceptions apply. Players may hold more than one non-FIFA nationality.

No.	Pos.	Nation	Player
8	FW	RUS	Pavel Pogrebnyak (from (England) Reading)
20	DF	RUS	Vitali Dyakov (from Rostov)
22	FW	RUS	Pavel Solomatin (end of loan to Amkar Perm)
23	MF	RUS	Anton Sosnin (from Kuban Krasnodar)
60	DF	RUS	Artyom Gorbulin
63	MF	RUS	Pavel Lelyukhin (from Spartak Moscow)
66	MF	RUS	Anton Antonov
70	DF	RUS	Maksim Nenakhov
71	DF	RUS	Roman Denisov
76	MF	RUS	Osman Isayev
78	FW	RUS	Stanislav Latsevich
81	GK	RUS	Pyotr Kosarevsky
86	MF	RUS	Vyacheslav Grulyov
93	MF	RUS	Eduard Sholokh
96	DF	RUS	Aleksandr Zakharov

Out: Note: Flags indicate national team as defined under FIFA eligibility rules; some limited exceptions apply. Players may hold more than one non-FIFA nationality.

No.	Pos.	Nation	Player
5	DF	NED	Douglas (to (Turkey) Trabzonspor)
6	MF	FRA	William Vainqueur (to (Italy) Roma)
7	MF	HUN	Balázs Dzsudzsák (to (Turkey) Bursaspor)
8	MF	RUS	Artur Yusupov (to Zenit Saint Petersburg)
14	MF	FRA	Mathieu Valbuena (to (France) Olympique Lyonnais)
21	GK	ARM	Roman Berezovsky (retired)
22	FW	GER	Kevin Kurányi (to (Germany) TSG 1899 Hoffenheim)
28	DF	FIN	Boris Rotenberg (on loan to Rostov)
34	MF	RUS	Artyom Katashevsky (to Dynamo Saint Petersburg)
45	DF	RUS	Artyom Yarmolitsky (to Tom Tomsk)
71	MF	RUS	Igor Gorbunov (to Dynamo Saint Petersburg)
76	DF	RUS	Anton Ivanov (on loan to Dynamo Saint Petersburg)
86	MF	RUS	Artyom Malakhov (to Dynamo Saint Petersburg)
—	GK	RUS	Yevgeni Frolov (to Kuban Krasnodar, previously on loan to Sakhalin Yuzhno-Sakhalinsk)
—	GK	RUS	Yegor Generalov (to Dynamo Saint Petersburg, previously on loan to Saturn Ramenskoye)
—	DF	RUS	Vladimir Granat (to Spartak Moscow, previously on loan to FC Rostov)
—	DF	CRO	Gordon Schildenfeld (to (Croatia) Dinamo Zagreb, previously on loan at (Greece) Panathinaikos)
—	MF	RUS	Aleksandr Ilyin (on loan to Dynamo Saint Petersburg, previously on loan to Sakhalin Yuzhno-Sakhalinsk)
—	FW	RUS	Andrei Panyukov (to (Lithuania) Atlantas Klaipėda, previously on loan)
—	FW	RUS	Fyodor Smolov (to FC Krasnodar, previously on loan to Ural Sverdlovsk Oblast)

=== Krasnodar ===
In: Note: Flags indicate national team as defined under FIFA eligibility rules; some limited exceptions apply. Players may hold more than one non-FIFA nationality.

No.	Pos.	Nation	Player
3	DF	NOR	Stefan Strandberg (from (Norway) Rosenborg)
4	MF	RUS	Dmitri Torbinski (from FC Rostov)
15	DF	RUS	Nikolay Markov (end of loan to Ural Sverdlovsk Oblast)
16	GK	RUS	Anton Kochenkov (on loan from Lokomotiv Moscow)
39	GK	RUS	Matvei Safonov
40	DF	RUS	Elgyun Ulukhanov (from CSKA Moscow)
42	DF	RUS	Konstantin Zhuzhgov
45	DF	RUS	Igor Paradin
48	DF	RUS	Aleksandr Marchenko (end of loan to Chernomorets Novorossiysk)
50	DF	RUS	Artyom Golubev
54	MF	RUS	Vyacheslav Yakimov
57	DF	RUS	Ilya Nasonkin
62	MF	RUS	Aleks Matsukatov
63	FW	RUS	Nikolay Komlichenko (end of loan to Chernomorets Novorossiysk)
70	MF	RUS	Daniil Utkin
71	FW	RUS	Aleksandr Butenko
73	FW	RUS	Roman Razzhivin
76	FW	RUS	Abdulmuslim Asilderov
77	MF	BFA	Charles Kaboré (on loan from Kuban Krasnodar)
82	DF	RUS	Sergei Borodin
85	FW	RUS	Ivan Ignatyev
90	FW	RUS	Fyodor Smolov (from Dynamo Moscow)
93	FW	RUS	Magomed-Shapi Suleymanov
94	DF	RUS	Yevgeni Nazarov (from Viktor Ponedelnik Academy Rostov-on-Don, April 2015)

Out: Note: Flags indicate national team as defined under FIFA eligibility rules; some limited exceptions apply. Players may hold more than one non-FIFA nationality.

No.	Pos.	Nation	Player
4	DF	BLR	Alyaksandr Martynovich (on loan to Ural Sverdlovsk Oblast)
11	MF	RUS	Marat Izmailov (end of loan from (Portugal) Porto)
15	MF	RUS	Roman Shirokov (end of loan from Spartak Moscow)
20	MF	RUS	Ruslan Adzhindzhal (retired)
25	MF	RUS	Yevgeni Shipitsin (to Mordovia Saransk)
37	DF	RUS	Aleksandr Luzin (released, April 2015)
42	DF	RUS	Dmitri Novak (to Sibir-2 Novosibirsk)
42	DF	RUS	Konstantin Zhuzhgov
45	GK	RUS	Vsevolod Yermakov (released, March 2015)
57	MF	RUS	Nikita Akimov (released, April 2015)
58	FW	RUS	Ilya Yurchenko (to Lokomotiv Liski)
62	MF	RUS	Ruslan Rzayev
63	MF	RUS	Vladislav Pavlyuchenko
64	MF	RUS	Oleg Lanin (on loan to Baltika Kaliningrad)
65	DF	RUS	Andrei Gamalyan
71	DF	RUS	Dmitri Kuzmichyov
73	GK	RUS	Stanislav Antipin (to MITOS Novocherkassk)
76	MF	RUS	Aleksandr Ageyev (on loan to Energomash Belgorod)
82	MF	RUS	Nikita Rulevsky
93	DF	RUS	Anton Maltsev
—	DF	RUS	Sergei Khmelevskoy (to MITOS Novocherkassk, previously on loan)
—	MF	RUS	Kirill Morozov (to Zenit-Izhevsk, previously on loan to Afips Afipsky)
—	MF	RUS	Aleksei Pomerko (to Krylia Sovetov Samara, previously on loan)
—	FW	RUS	Ruslan Bolov (to Volgar Astrakhan, previously on loan)
—	FW	RUS	Nikita Burmistrov (on loan to Ural Sverdlovsk Oblast, previously on loan to Tom Tomsk)

=== Krylia Sovetov Samara ===
In: Note: Flags indicate national team as defined under FIFA eligibility rules; some limited exceptions apply. Players may hold more than one non-FIFA nationality.

No.	Pos.	Nation	Player
1	GK	RUS	Miroslav Lobantsev (on loan from Lokomotiv Moscow)
7	MF	FRA	Yohan Mollo (on loan from (France) Saint-Étienne)
9	FW	FIN	Berat Sadik (from (Switzerland) Thun)
17	GK	GEO	Giorgi Loria (from (Greece) Olympiacos)
19	DF	TRI	Sheldon Bateau (on loan from (Belgium) Mechelen)
20	MF	RUS	Aleksei Pomerko (from Krasnodar, previously on loan)
27	FW	CIV	Junior Ahissan (from (Ivory Coast) Ivoire Academie)
32	FW	CHI	Nicolás Canales (from (Azerbaijan) Neftchi Baku)
33	DF	SRB	Milan Rodić (from Zenit Saint Petersburg)
39	FW	RUS	Nikita Podyachev (from Lokomotiv Moscow)
44	DF	RUS	Semyon Biryukov (from Krylia Sovetov-TsPF Samara)
55	MF	RUS	Andrei Kalinin (from Krylia Sovetov-TsPF Samara)
61	MF	RUS	Nikolai Kiritsa (from Krylia Sovetov-TsPF Samara)
66	MF	RUS	Saveliy Kozlov
67	MF	RUS	David Zakharyan (from Krylia Sovetov-TsPF Samara)
69	FW	RUS	Yegor Golenkov (from Akademiya-Lada-M Primorsky)
70	MF	RUS	Danila Popov (from Akademiya-Lada-M Primorsky)
71	GK	RUS	Danila Yermakov (from Krylia Sovetov-TsPF Samara)
80	MF	RUS	Leonid Afinogentov (from Krylia Sovetov-TsPF Samara)
87	DF	RUS	Andrei Krasnov (from Akademiya-Lada-M Primorsky)
89	DF	RUS	Vladislav Masalsky (from Lada-Togliatti)
91	FW	RUS	Pavel Yakovlev (on loan from Spartak Moscow)
96	DF	RUS	Kirill Mironov (from FC Sibir-2 Novosibirsk)
97	MF	RUS	Daniil Melikhov (from Krylia Sovetov-TsPF Samara)
98	FW	RUS	Ilya Viznovich (from Lada-Togliatti)
99	DF	RUS	Aleksei Makushkin (from Lada-Togliatti)

Out: Note: Flags indicate national team as defined under FIFA eligibility rules; some limited exceptions apply. Players may hold more than one non-FIFA nationality.

No.	Pos.	Nation	Player
1	GK	RUS	Denis Vavilin (to Volga Nizhny Novgorod)
6	DF	BRA	Bruno Teles (to (Brazil) Vasco da Gama)
11	MF	RUS	Emin Makhmudov (on loan to Mordovia Saransk)
14	MF	RUS	Aleksandr Yeliseyev (to Volgar Astrakhan)
17	FW	RUS	Sergei Sipatov (released)
25	MF	RUS	Denis Tkachuk (to Zenit Saint Petersburg)
51	GK	RUS	Yevgeni Kobozev (end of loan from Terek Grozny)
70	FW	RUS	Serder Serderov (end of loan from Anzhi Makhachkala)
89	MF	RUS	Maksim Paliyenko (to Zenit Saint Petersburg)
92	DF	RUS	Sergei Obivalin (on loan to Lada-Togliatti)
—	GK	SVK	Ján Mucha (to (Slovakia) Slovan Bratislava, previously on loan to Arsenal Tula)
—	GK	RUS	Saveliy Tolstopyatov (to Syzran-2003 Syzran, previously on loan)
—	GK	BLR	Syarhey Vyeramko (to (Greece) Levadiakos, previously on loan to Ufa)
—	DF	RUS	Valeri Pochivalin (to Neftekhimik Nizhnekamsk, previously on loan to Syzran-2003 Syzran)
—	DF	RUS	Pavel Vasilyev (to (Armenia) Mika, previously on loan to Lada-Togliatti)
—	MF	RUS	Anton Bocharov (on loan to Lada-Togliatti, previously on loan to Syzran-2003 Syzran)
—	MF	ARM	Robert Darbinyan (released, previously on loan to (Armenia) Shirak)
—	FW	RUS	Artyom Delkin (to Gazovik Orenburg, previously on loan to Tyumen)

=== Kuban Krasnodar ===
In: Note: Flags indicate national team as defined under FIFA eligibility rules; some limited exceptions apply. Players may hold more than one non-FIFA nationality.

No.	Pos.	Nation	Player
1	GK	RUS	Yevgeni Frolov (from Dynamo Moscow)
9	FW	RUS	Roman Pavlyuchenko (from Lokomotiv Moscow)
10	MF	RUS	Andrei Arshavin (from Zenit Saint Petersburg)
13	GK	RUS	Nikita Khaykin (from Mordovia Saransk)
17	MF	RUS	Svyatoslav Georgiyevsky (from CSKA Moscow)
21	DF	RUS	Vladimir Lobkaryov (from Torpedo Armavir)
60	MF	RUS	Yuri Mitrokhin
62	FW	RUS	Ilya Stefanovich (from Znamya Truda Orekhovo-Zuyevo)
63	MF	RUS	Nikita Kozlovsky (from LFK Lokomotiv Moscow)
68	DF	RUS	Aleksei Ivanushkin (from Spartak Moscow)
69	DF	RUS	Ilya Shushkin
74	MF	RUS	Konstantin Kurkulov
77	MF	RUS	Sergei Tkachyov (from Lokomotiv Moscow, previously on loan)
80	DF	RUS	Daniil Marugin
82	GK	RUS	Aleksandr Akishin (from Lokomotiv Moscow)
85	MF	RUS	Yakov Minkov (from Afips Afipsky)
92	MF	RUS	Dmitri Galkin (from LFK Lokomotiv Moscow)

Out: Note: Flags indicate national team as defined under FIFA eligibility rules; some limited exceptions apply. Players may hold more than one non-FIFA nationality.

No.	Pos.	Nation	Player
1	GK	RUS	Eduard Baychora (to Tosno)
10	MF	BFA	Charles Kaboré (on loan to Krasnodar)
13	GK	RUS	Yevgeny Pomazan (end of loan from Anzhi Makhachkala)
14	DF	BIH	Toni Šunjić (to (Germany) VfB Stuttgart)
20	FW	POR	Hugo Almeida (to Anzhi Makhachkala)
22	MF	RUS	Anton Sosnin (to Dynamo Moscow)
38	DF	RUS	Andrey Yeshchenko (end of loan from Anzhi Makhachkala)
60	MF	RUS	Valeri Zubov
62	MF	RUS	Artyom Yakovlev
63	FW	RUS	Aleksandr Kurteyan
68	DF	RUS	Anatoli Khubezhov
69	MF	RUS	Vladislav Rochev
71	MF	BUL	Ivelin Popov (to Spartak Moscow)
79	GK	RUS	Vladislav Shevchenko (to Biolog-Novokubansk)
80	DF	RUS	Aleksandr Ladik
82	GK	RUS	Maksim Zamyshlyayev
85	FW	RUS	Igor Zaporozhtsev
91	MF	RUS	Anton Moiseyev (to Feniks Bolshoy Beysug)
92	FW	RUS	Maksim Lauk (to Dynamo Kirov)
95	FW	RUS	Vardan Pogosyan (on loan to (Armenia) Pyunik Yerevan)
—	FW	URU	Gonzalo Bueno (on loan to (Portugal) União da Madeira, previously on loan to (Uruguay) Nacional)

=== Lokomotiv Moscow ===
In: Note: Flags indicate national team as defined under FIFA eligibility rules; some limited exceptions apply. Players may hold more than one non-FIFA nationality.

No.	Pos.	Nation	Player
9	MF	RUS	Maksim Grigoryev (end of loan to Rostov)
18	MF	RUS	Aleksandr Kolomeytsev (from Amkar Perm)
70	GK	RUS	Stepan Krymov (own academy, April 2015)
77	GK	RUS	Anton Kochenkov (from Mordovia Saransk)
78	FW	RUS	Ilya Rubtsov (from Spartak Moscow academy)
88	MF	CGO	Delvin N'Dinga (on loan from (France) Monaco)
91	GK	RUS	Maksim Ivashov

Out: Note: Flags indicate national team as defined under FIFA eligibility rules; some limited exceptions apply. Players may hold more than one non-FIFA nationality.

No.	Pos.	Nation	Player
9	FW	RUS	Roman Pavlyuchenko (to Kuban Krasnodar)
22	DF	RUS	Maksim Belyayev (to Shinnik Yaroslavl)
26	MF	BLR	Yan Tsiharaw (to (Belarus) Dinamo Minsk)
35	GK	RUS	Filipp Kharin
37	FW	RUS	Andrea Chukanov (to Tyumen)
38	GK	RUS	Aleksandr Akishin (to Kuban Krasnodar)
41	GK	RUS	Miroslav Lobantsev (on loan to Krylia Sovetov Samara)
43	MF	RUS	Andrei Chernetsov (to Vityaz Podolsk)
44	DF	RUS	Aleksandr Logunov (on loan to Baltika Kaliningrad)
61	GK	RUS	Maksim Danilyants
70	GK	RUS	Stepan Krymov
77	GK	RUS	Anton Kochenkov (on loan to Krasnodar)
91	FW	RUS	Nikita Podyachev (to Krylia Sovetov Samara)
95	FW	RUS	Nozim Babadzhanov (to (Tajikistan) Regar-TadAZ Tursunzoda, April 2015)
96	GK	RUS	Ilya Ishchenko
—	MF	RUS	Magomed Ozdoyev (to Rubin Kazan, previously on loan)
—	MF	RUS	Sergei Tkachyov (to Kuban Krasnodar, previously on loan)
—	FW	NGA	Victor Obinna (to (Germany) MSV Duisburg)

=== Mordovia Saransk ===
In: Note: Flags indicate national team as defined under FIFA eligibility rules; some limited exceptions apply. Players may hold more than one non-FIFA nationality.

No.	Pos.	Nation	Player
5	DF	GEO	Mamuka Kobakhidze (on loan from Rubin Kazan)
15	MF	RUS	Emin Makhmudov (on loan from Krylia Sovetov Samara)
16	MF	SVN	Dalibor Stevanović (from Torpedo Moscow)
23	FW	RUS	Ruslan Mukhametshin (from Rubin Kazan, previously on loan)
25	MF	RUS	Yevgeni Shipitsin (from Krasnodar)
33	DF	RUS	Vladimir Rykov (from Torpedo Moscow)
43	DF	RUS	Nikita Aksyonov (from Mordovia-2 Saransk)
46	DF	RUS	Ilya Kuzin
50	MF	RUS	Artyom Grishin (from Mordovia-2 Saransk)
51	GK	RUS	Yevgeni Uvin
52	DF	RUS	Yegor Sysuyev (from Mordovia-2 Saransk)
58	MF	RUS	Dinar Khaybullin (from Saransk-Mordovia Saransk)
59	FW	RUS	Sergei Tishenkov (from Mordovia-2 Saransk)
63	MF	RUS	Nikita Mukhin (from Mordovia-2 Saransk)
64	MF	RUS	Pavel Kulnin (from Mordovia-2 Saransk)
67	MF	RUS	Artyom Yashchuk (from Mordovia-2 Saransk)
68	MF	RUS	Yegor Dmitriyev (from Khimik-Avgust Vurnary)
69	MF	RUS	Aleksandr Kurchavy
71	DF	RUS	Maksim Tishkin (from Ufa)
73	MF	RUS	Anton Afonin
77	GK	GEO	Nukri Revishvili (from Tosno)
97	DF	FRA	Thomas Phibel

Out: Note: Flags indicate national team as defined under FIFA eligibility rules; some limited exceptions apply. Players may hold more than one non-FIFA nationality.

No.	Pos.	Nation	Player
1	GK	RUS	Anton Kochenkov (to Lokomotiv Moscow)
5	DF	RUS	Viktor Vasin (end of loan from CSKA Moscow)
6	MF	NED	Mitchell Donald (on loan to (Serbia) Red Star Belgrade)
9	MF	RUS	Rustem Mukhametshin (to Tosno)
10	MF	BEL	Danilo Sousa Campos (to (Ukraine) Dnipro Dnipropetrovsk)
12	DF	MNE	Vladimir Božović
14	MF	RUS	Pavel Yakovlev (end of loan from Spartak Moscow)
18	DF	SEN	Baye Ibrahima Niasse (released)
20	MF	UKR	Matvey Guyganov
34	MF	RUS	Igor Krutov (to Astrakhan)
46	DF	RUS	Zaur Alborov
49	MF	RUS	Timon Abbakumov
50	MF	RUS	Dmitri Larin
51	GK	RUS	Yevgeni Zimin
53	MF	RUS	Timur Raimov
58	MF	RUS	Aleksandr Shinkarenko (to Kafa Feodosiya)
61	GK	RUS	Aleksei Varlamov
62	FW	RUS	Oleg Kachmazov
64	MF	RUS	Andrei Yemelin
65	MF	RUS	Aleksei Larin
67	DF	RUS	David Ozmanov (to SKA-Energiya Khabarovsk)
68	DF	RUS	Farid Kutbeyev
71	GK	RUS	Ilya Kamalikhin
75	FW	RUS	Denis Abramov
76	FW	RUS	Ilya Yermoshkin
81	GK	RUS	Nikita Khaykin (to Kuban Krasnodar)
82	DF	RUS	Vladimir Kotkov
83	FW	RUS	Maksim Churakov
91	MF	NED	Lorenzo Ebecilio (end of loan from (Ukraine) Metalurh Donetsk)
—	DF	RUS	Aleksandr Strokov (released, previously on loan to Tambov)
—	FW	RUS	Mikhail Markin (on loan to Tyumen, previously on loan to Khimki)
—	FW	RUS	Maksim Rogov (to Dynamo Saint Petersburg, previously on loan)

=== Rostov ===
In: Note: Flags indicate national team as defined under FIFA eligibility rules; some limited exceptions apply. Players may hold more than one non-FIFA nationality.

No.	Pos.	Nation	Player
4	DF	RUS	Denis Terentyev (from Zenit Saint Petersburg, previously on loan to Tom Tomsk)
5	DF	CRC	Felicio Brown Forbes (free agent)
16	MF	ECU	Christian Noboa (from (Greece) PAOK)
17	MF	RUS	Igor Kireyev (end of loan to Amkar Perm)
18	MF	RUS	Pavel Mogilevets (on loan from Zenit Saint Petersburg)
19	MF	RUS	Khoren Bayramyan (end of loan to Volgar Astrakhan)
21	MF	RUS	Said-Ali Akhmayev (from Spartak Moscow, previously on loan)
28	DF	FIN	Boris Rotenberg (on loan from Dynamo Moscow)
34	DF	RUS	Timofei Margasov (end of loan to Sibir Novosibirsk)
37	MF	RUS	Sergei Zabrodin (from Rostov-M-2 Rostov-on-Don)
44	DF	ESP	César Navas (from Rubin Kazan)
46	FW	RUS	Danila Lyuft
48	MF	RUS	Artyom Maksimenko (from Dynamo Moscow academy)
51	GK	RUS	Ivan Zozin
58	MF	RUS	Maksim Kondrashyov (from Rostov-M-2 Rostov-on-Don)
59	DF	RUS	Ivan Reutenko (from Rostov-M-2 Rostov-on-Don)
68	MF	RUS	Vasili Lipin (from Rostov-M-2 Rostov-on-Don)
74	MF	RUS	Yevgeni Stukanov
78	FW	RUS	Dmitri Solovyov (from Rostov-M-2 Rostov-on-Don)
87	MF	RUS	Maksim Sukhomlinov (from Rostov-M-2 Rostov-on-Don)
94	GK	RUS	Roman Pshukov (from Rostov-M-2 Rostov-on-Don)
96	DF	RUS	Nikita Bocharov
98	DF	RUS	Sergei Kiryakov

Out: Note: Flags indicate national team as defined under FIFA eligibility rules; some limited exceptions apply. Players may hold more than one non-FIFA nationality.

No.	Pos.	Nation	Player
1	GK	CRO	Stipe Pletikosa (released)
3	DF	RUS	Vladimir Granat (end of loan from Dynamo Moscow)
4	MF	RUS	Dmitri Torbinski (to FC Krasnodar)
5	DF	RUS	Vitali Dyakov (to Dynamo Moscow)
6	FW	RUS	Aleksei Rebko (to Nika Moscow)
7	MF	RUS	Maksim Grigoryev (end of loan from Lokomotiv Moscow)
13	GK	BLR	Anton Amelchenko (to Fakel Voronezh)
15	DF	BLR	Maksim Bardachow (end of loan from Tom Tomsk)
16	MF	MDA	Mihai Plătică (to Shinnik Yaroslavl)
17	FW	TKM	Wahyt Orazsähedow (to (Turkmenistan) Aşgabat)
19	DF	CRO	Hrvoje Milić (to (Croatia) Hajduk Split)
22	FW	RUS	Artyom Dzyuba (end of loan from Spartak Moscow)
27	DF	CIV	Igor Lolo
39	DF	RUS	Andrei Demchenko (to Solyaris Moscow)
44	DF	RUS	Anton Smirnov
54	DF	RUS	Konstantin Kulabukhov (to Dynamo Barnaul)
55	DF	RSA	Siyanda Xulu (to (South Africa) Kaizer Chiefs)
58	MF	RUS	Dmitri Kartashov
59	DF	RUS	Mikhail Martynov (to Volga Tver)
61	FW	RUS	Gennadi Kozlov (to Zenit-Izhevsk Izhevsk)
70	FW	RUS	Aleksandr Stepanov (to Torpedo Moscow)
88	MF	LTU	Edgaras Česnauskis
96	MF	RUS	Aleksandr Yuryev (to Vityaz Podolsk)
—	DF	RUS	Ruslan Abazov (on loan to Fakel Voronezh, then on loan to Tyumen, previously on loan to Tyumen)
—	DF	RUS	Temur Mustafin (to Avangard Kursk, previously on loan)
—	DF	RUS	Andrei Vasilyev (to Zenit-2 St. Petersburg, previously on loan to Arsenal Tula)
—	MF	RUS	Ivan Baklanov (released, previously on loan to Arsenal-2 Tula)
—	MF	RUS	Sergey Belousov (to Metallurg Lipetsk, previously on loan to Sokol Saratov)
—	MF	RUS	Nika Chkhapeliya (to Baltika Kaliningrad, previously on loan to Zenit Penza)
—	MF	RUS	Azim Fatullayev (to Yenisey Krasnoyarsk, previously on loan to FC Tosno)
—	MF	RUS	Artyom Kulishev (to Dynamo Saint Petersburg, previously on loan to Vityaz Podolsk)

=== Rubin Kazan ===
In: Note: Flags indicate national team as defined under FIFA eligibility rules; some limited exceptions apply. Players may hold more than one non-FIFA nationality.

No.	Pos.	Nation	Player
4	DF	URU	Mauricio Lemos (on loan from (Uruguay) Defensor Sporting)
8	DF	RUS	Maksim Batov (from Amkar Perm)
9	FW	RUS	Ramil Sheydayev (on loan from Zenit Saint Petersburg)
11	FW	UKR	Marko Dević (end of loan at (Qatar) Al Rayyan)
13	GK	IRN	Alireza Haghighi (end of loan to (Portugal) Penafiel)
14	MF	RUS	Diniyar Bilyaletdinov (from Spartak Moscow, previously on loan to Torpedo Moscow)
21	DF	URU	Guillermo Cotugno (from (Uruguay) Danubio, previously on loan)
27	MF	RUS	Magomed Ozdoyev (from Lokomotiv Moscow, previously on loan)
40	DF	RUS	Danis Giniyatullin
42	DF	RUS	Amir Gavrilov
54	FW	RUS	Shakhrom Sulaymonov
64	FW	RUS	Nikita Tankov
65	DF	RUS	Maksim Zhestokov (end of loan to Volga Nizhny Novgorod)
72	FW	RUS	Kamil Mullin (end of loan to Sokol Saratov)
93	MF	RUS	Albert Sharipov (from Tom Tomsk)
96	MF	RUS	German Frolov
97	FW	RUS	Dmitri Kamenshchikov
98	GK	RUS	Anton Chernov

Out: Note: Flags indicate national team as defined under FIFA eligibility rules; some limited exceptions apply. Players may hold more than one non-FIFA nationality.

No.	Pos.	Nation	Player
9	FW	RUS	Dmitri Otstavnov (on loan to Volga Ulyanovsk)
10	FW	CRO	Marko Livaja (on loan to (Italy) Empoli)
16	MF	RUS	Ilsur Samigullin (on loan to (Kazakhstan) Zhetysu)
23	DF	GEO	Mamuka Kobakhidze (on loan to Mordovia Saransk)
38	MF	FRA	Yann M'Vila (on loan to (England) Sunderland, previously on loan at (Italy) Internazionale Milano)
39	DF	COD	Chris Mavinga (on loan to (France) ESTAC, previously on loan at (France) Stade de Reims)
40	MF	RUS	Timur Ayupov
42	DF	RUS	Denis Kibardin (on loan to Zenit-Izhevsk Izhevsk)
44	DF	ESP	César Navas (to FC Rostov)
44	MF	GHA	Wakaso Mubarak (on loan to (Spain) Las Palmas, previously on loan at (Scotland) Celtic)
52	MF	RUS	Aleksei Kotlyarov
57	MF	RUS	Nikita Lobanov
58	FW	RUS	Andrei Vshivtsev (to Dnepr Smolensk)
64	MF	RUS	Nikita Bocharov (to Tom-2 Tomsk)
66	MF	RUS	Marat Sitdikov (to Dnepr Smolensk)
68	GK	RUS	Yaroslav Maloletkov
72	FW	RUS	Kamil Mullin (on loan to Sokol Saratov)
73	MF	RUS	Ranis Khusnutdinov
78	MF	RUS	Mikhail Petrolay (on loan to (Kazakhstan) Zhetysu)
79	MF	UZB	Bobir Davlatov (on loan to (Kazakhstan) Zhetysu)
90	FW	RUS	Ruslan Galiakberov (on loan to (Kazakhstan) Zhetysu)
92	MF	RUS	Pavel Shadrin (on loan to Zenit-Izhevsk Izhevsk)
93	MF	RUS	Ildar Bikchantayev (to Zenit Penza)
94	MF	RUS	Artyom Kuklev
95	MF	RUS	Almaz Askarov (to Gazovik Orenburg)
98	DF	RUS	Almaz Nasybullin
—	FW	RUS	Sergei Davydov (on loan to KAMAZ Naberezhnye Chelny, previously on loan to Torpedo Moscow)
—	FW	RUS	Ruslan Mukhametshin (to Mordovia Saransk, previously on loan)

=== Spartak Moscow ===
In: Note: Flags indicate national team as defined under FIFA eligibility rules; some limited exceptions apply. Players may hold more than one non-FIFA nationality.

No.	Pos.	Nation	Player
7	MF	RUS	Kirill Kombarov (end of loan to Torpedo Moscow)
13	DF	RUS	Vladimir Granat (from Dynamo Moscow)
15	MF	RUS	Roman Shirokov (end of loan to Krasnodar)
16	DF	ITA	Salvatore Bocchetti (end of loan to (Italy) Milan)
20	FW	CPV	Zé Luís (from (Portugal) Braga)
27	MF	RUS	Aleksandr Zotov (end of loan to Arsenal Tula)
43	FW	RUS	Daniil Makeyev (from own academy)
71	MF	BUL	Ivelin Popov (from Kuban Krasnodar)
76	DF	RUS	Ivan Kostylev (from Spartak Kostroma)
79	FW	RUS	Aleksandr Rudenko
84	MF	RUS	Boris Tsygankov
87	MF	RUS	Pavel Lelyukhin
91	MF	RUS	Aleksandr Lomovitskiy
92	DF	RUS	Nikolai Rasskazov
95	MF	RUS	Vladislav Razdelkin

Out: Note: Flags indicate national team as defined under FIFA eligibility rules; some limited exceptions apply. Players may hold more than one non-FIFA nationality.

No.	Pos.	Nation	Player
2	DF	ARG	Juan Manuel Insaurralde (to (Mexico) Chiapas)
19	MF	ESP	José Manuel Jurado (to (England) Watford F.C.)
20	MF	GER	Patrick Ebert (to (Spain) Rayo Vallecano)
21	MF	SWE	Kim Källström (to (Switzerland) Grasshopper Zürich)
30	GK	RUS	Sergei Pesyakov (on loan to Anzhi Makhachkala)
42	MF	RUS	Yegor Sidoruk (to Neftekhimik Nizhnekamsk)
44	FW	RUS	Pavel Yakovlev (on loan to Krylia Sovetov Samara, previously on loan to Mordovia Saransk)
48	DF	RUS	Aleksandr Stepanov (to Torpedo Armavir)
50	MF	RUS	Aleksandr Manyukov (to Avangard Kursk)
54	DF	RUS	Yegor Yevteyev
55	DF	BRA	João Carlos (to (Brazil) Vasco da Gama)
57	FW	RUS	Vyacheslav Krotov (to Ufa)
68	DF	RUS	Aleksei Ivanushkin (to Kuban Krasnodar)
76	MF	RUS	Pavel Globa
79	MF	RUS	Vladislav Masternoy (to Avangard Kursk)
86	MF	RUS	Danila Buranov (to Torpedo Armavir)
87	MF	RUS	Pavel Lelyukhin (to Dynamo Moscow)
—	MF	RUS	Diniyar Bilyaletdinov (to Rubin Kazan, previously on loan to Torpedo Moscow)
—	MF	BRA	Rafael Carioca (to (Brazil) Atlético Mineiro, previously on loan)
—	FW	RUS	Said-Ali Akhmayev (to FC Rostov, previously on loan)
—	FW	PAR	Lucas Barrios (to (Brazil) Palmeiras, previously on loan at (France) Montpellier HSC)
—	FW	RUS	Artyom Dzyuba (to Zenit Saint Petersburg, previously on loan to FC Rostov)

=== Terek Grozny ===
In: Note: Flags indicate national team as defined under FIFA eligibility rules; some limited exceptions apply. Players may hold more than one non-FIFA nationality.

No.	Pos.	Nation	Player
3	DF	GEO	Tedore Grigalashvili (from (Georgia (country)) Samtredia)
9	FW	RUS	Zaur Sadayev (end of loan to (Poland) Lech Poznań)
22	MF	RUS	Reziuan Mirzov (from Torpedo Moscow)
30	MF	ROU	Gheorghe Grozav (end of loan to (Romania) Dinamo București)
34	FW	RUS	Taimaz Khizriyev
37	GK	RUS	Turpal-Ali Debirov (from Gums Gudermes)
39	FW	RUS	Ali Khusainov
41	FW	RUS	Khalim Yunusov
52	MF	RUS	Abdurakhman Akhilgov
53	DF	RUS	Ali Bamatgeriyev
63	MF	RUS	Chingiz Magomadov
79	DF	RUS	Zubayr Madayev
82	FW	RUS	Viskhazh Israilov (from Terek-2 Grozny)
85	MF	RUS	Sharapudin Shalbuzov (from Terek-2 Grozny)
89	MF	RUS	Yevgeni Degtyaryov (from Saturn Ramenskoye)
91	MF	RUS	Rakhman Momuyev
92	DF	RUS	Kerim Magamayev
95	FW	RUS	Magomed Mitrishev (end of loan to Anzhi Makhachkala)
97	GK	RUS	Rasul Umayev
98	MF	RUS	Adam Abdurakhmanov

Out: Note: Flags indicate national team as defined under FIFA eligibility rules; some limited exceptions apply. Players may hold more than one non-FIFA nationality.

No.	Pos.	Nation	Player
3	DF	CMR	Adolphe Teikeu (end of loan from (Ukraine) Chornomorets Odesa)
4	DF	FIN	Juhani Ojala (on loan to (Finland) HJK)
9	FW	BRA	Aílton José Almeida (to (Saudi Arabia) Al-Hilal)
12	GK	RUS	Mokhmad-Emi Gazaliyev
18	FW	COD	Jeremy Bokila (to (China) Guangzhou R&F)
22	FW	SRB	Marko Šćepović (end of loan from (Greece) Olympiacos)
39	MF	RUS	Muslim Ismailov
41	DF	RUS	Islam Yakhyayev
52	MF	RUS	Ismail Matayev
53	DF	RUS	Magomed Barzukayev
56	FW	RUS	Islam Magamadov
57	MF	RUS	Deni Daliyev
58	FW	RUS	Arsen Vagidov
63	DF	RUS	Alikhan Abukhazhiyev
65	FW	RUS	Arbi Musluyev
67	DF	RUS	Arbi Salikhov
68	MF	RUS	Adlan Muzhedov
71	MF	RUS	Daud Daliyev
74	MF	RUS	Arbi Davletgereyev
79	FW	RUS	Umar Asakov
85	MF	RUS	Ali Idrisov
89	MF	RUS	Muslim Batayev
91	GK	RUS	Magomed Dokuyev
94	MF	RUS	Salakh Barzukayev
—	GK	RUS	Yevgeni Kobozev (to Tosno, previously on loan to Krylia Sovetov Samara)
—	DF	RUS	Murad Tagilov (released, previously on loan to Khimik Dzerzhinsk)
—	DF	RUS	Dmitri Yashin (on loan to Baikal Irkutsk, previously on loan to Oryol)

=== Ufa ===
In: Note: Flags indicate national team as defined under FIFA eligibility rules; some limited exceptions apply. Players may hold more than one non-FIFA nationality.

No.	Pos.	Nation	Player
2	DF	UKR	Oleksandr Filin (from (Ukraine) Shakhtar Donetsk youth team)
4	DF	RUS	Aleksei Nikitin (from Amkar Perm)
6	FW	GER	Marvin Pourié (on loan from (Denmark) Copenhagen)
7	DF	RUS	Yevgeni Osipov (from Arsenal Tula)
8	MF	RUS	Semyon Fomin (from Torpedo Moscow)
20	DF	RUS	Denis Tumasyan (from Ural Sverdlovsk Oblast, previously on loan)
34	DF	RUS	Aleksandr Katsalapov (from Torpedo Moscow)
42	GK	RUS	Sergei Narubin (from Tosno)
44	MF	NGA	Sylvester Igboun (from (Denmark) Midtjylland)
53	GK	RUS	Gleb Yefimov (from Akademiya Ufa)
65	MF	RUS	Maksim Lysenkov (from Ufa-2)
71	GK	RUS	Andrey Lunyov (from Saturn Ramenskoye)
79	MF	RUS	Vadim Solovey
80	MF	RUS	Andranik Mnatsakanyan (from Ufa-2)
82	MF	RUS	Rinat Kireyev (from Ufa-2)
83	DF	RUS	Yegor Romanovsky (from Akademiya Ufa)
84	MF	RUS	Maksim Molchanov
90	FW	RUS	Vyacheslav Zhuravlyov (from Ufa-2)
93	FW	RUS	Vyacheslav Krotov (from Spartak Moscow)
94	MF	RUS	Azat Valimkhametov (from Ufa-2)
97	MF	RUS	Andrei Stepanov (from Ufa-2)

Out: Note: Flags indicate national team as defined under FIFA eligibility rules; some limited exceptions apply. Players may hold more than one non-FIFA nationality.

No.	Pos.	Nation	Player
4	MF	UKR	Pavlo Stepanets (to Fakel Voronezh)
16	GK	BLR	Syarhey Vyeramko (end of loan from Krylia Sovetov Samara)
18	FW	RUS	Dmitry Golubov (on loan to Tom Tomsk)
23	FW	RUS	Anton Kilin (to KAMAZ Naberezhnye Chelny)
28	DF	CRC	Felicio Brown Forbes (released, May 2015)
30	GK	RUS	Viktor Yanbarisov (to Ararat Ufa)
31	DF	RUS	Maksim Tishkin (to Mordovia Saransk)
40	MF	RUS	Ilya Sevastyanov (to Metallurg Asha)
44	MF	RUS	Timur Gogolidze
47	DF	RUS	Vladislav Filippov
55	DF	RUS	Stanislav Bugayev (to Ararat Ufa)
60	FW	RUS	Vladlen Khalfin
71	GK	RUS	Artyom Leonov (released)
79	DF	RUS	Oleg Kupryakov (to Ararat Ufa)
80	MF	RUS	Denis Gilmanov
88	FW	RUS	Igor Shevchenko
90	DF	RUS	Artur Shaybekov
91	MF	RUS	Rudolf Gabidullin
92	MF	RUS	Marat Atlukhanov
93	MF	RUS	Ruslan Akbashev
94	DF	RUS	Eduard Shaykhutdinov (to Ararat Ufa)
97	FW	RUS	Danil Shakirov
98	FW	RUS	Ilmir Yakupov (to Sibir Novosibirsk)
99	FW	RUS	Denis Gaysin (to Ararat Ufa)
—	MF	JPN	Takafumi Akahoshi (to (Poland) Pogoń Szczecin, previously on loan)
—	MF	RUS	Nikita Bezlikhotnov (on loan to SKA-Energiya Khabarovsk, previously on loan to Baltika Kaliningrad)
—	MF	RUS	Aleksandr Vasilyev (on loan to Torpedo Armavir, previously on loan to Tyumen)

=== Ural Sverdlovsk Oblast ===
In: Note: Flags indicate national team as defined under FIFA eligibility rules; some limited exceptions apply. Players may hold more than one non-FIFA nationality.

No.	Pos.	Nation	Player
4	DF	BLR	Alyaksandr Martynovich (on loan from Krasnodar)
5	DF	RUS	Ivan Knyazev (from Torpedo Moscow)
15	MF	UKR	Denys Kulakov (from (Ukraine) Metalist Kharkiv)
18	FW	RUS	Nikita Burmistrov (on loan from Krasnodar)
19	FW	RUS	Valeri Kuznetsov (from Amkar Perm)
20	DF	RUS	Roman Mironov
25	MF	RUS	Igor Lambarschi (end of loan to Tyumen)
27	DF	RUS	Mikhail Merkulov (from MITOS Novocherkassk)
30	GK	BLR	Yuri Zhevnov (from Torpedo Moscow)
32	MF	RUS	Andrei Gorbanets (end of loan to Tom Tomsk)
53	MF	RUS	Sergei Podoksyonov
77	MF	UKR	Dmytro Bilonoh (from (Ukraine) Shakhtar-3 Donetsk)
58	FW	RUS	Bogdan Mishukov
98	FW	SWE	Carlos Strandberg (on loan from CSKA Moscow)
99	GK	RUS	Aleksei Mamin

Out: Note: Flags indicate national team as defined under FIFA eligibility rules; some limited exceptions apply. Players may hold more than one non-FIFA nationality.

No.	Pos.	Nation	Player
8	MF	RUS	Ivan Chudin (to Tyumen)
27	DF	RUS	Mikhail Merkulov (on loan to Baikal Irkutsk)
28	GK	RUS	Nikolai Zabolotny
30	MF	RUS	Nikita Tikhonov
33	GK	RUS	Igor Kot (to Arsenal Tula)
38	MF	RUS	Nikita Mamonov
39	DF	RUS	Ignat Sabirzyanov (to Nosta Novotroitsk)
43	MF	RUS	Pavel Repin
44	GK	RUS	Ivan Klyuyev
45	FW	RUS	Aleksandr Sobolev
50	DF	RUS	Nikolay Markov (end of loan from FC Krasnodar)
55	MF	RUS	Anatoli Sedov
63	DF	RUS	Aleksandr Belozyorov
69	DF	RUS	Aleksei Nelyubin
71	FW	RUS	Elbeyi Guliyev (on loan to (Kazakhstan) Zhetysu)
81	FW	RUS	Semyon Voronov
82	MF	RUS	Vladimir Lisov
88	DF	RUS	Aleksei Gerasimov (on loan to (Kazakhstan) Zhetysu)
93	MF	RUS	Semyon Pomogayev
94	MF	RUS	Aleksandr Kashkarov
90	FW	RUS	Fyodor Smolov (end of loan from Dynamo Moscow)
—	DF	RUS	Adessoye Oyewole (to Gazovik Orenburg, previously on loan)
—	DF	RUS	Denis Tumasyan (to Ufa, previously on loan)
—	MF	RUS	Andrei Bochkov (contract expired, previously on loan to Tosno)
—	MF	RUS	Ivan Melnik (released, previously on loan to Khimik Dzerzhinsk)
—	FW	RUS	Arsen Goshokov (to KAMAZ Naberezhnye Chelny, previously on loan to Spartak Nalchik)
—	FW	RUS	Georgi Nurov (on loan to Tom Tomsk, previously on loan to Baltika Kaliningrad)

=== Zenit Saint Petersburg ===
In: Note: Flags indicate national team as defined under FIFA eligibility rules; some limited exceptions apply. Players may hold more than one non-FIFA nationality.

No.	Pos.	Nation	Player
14	MF	RUS	Artur Yusupov (from Dynamo Moscow)
22	FW	RUS	Artyom Dzyuba (from Spartak Moscow)
31	MF	RUS	Denis Tkachuk (from Krylia Sovetov Samara)
32	DF	RUS	Artyom Sumin
36	FW	RUS	Stanislav Krapukhin (own academy)
39	FW	RUS	Vasili Zapryagayev (own academy)
41	GK	RUS	Mikhail Kerzhakov (from Anzhi Makhachkala)
42	MF	RUS	Konstantin Kotov
46	MF	RUS	Vitali Gorulyov
49	MF	RUS	Dmitri Pletnyov
56	DF	RUS	Danil Krugovoy
57	DF	RUS	Nikolai Tarasov (own academy)
59	DF	RUS	Sergei Bugriyev
60	MF	RUS	Maksim Paliyenko (from Krylia Sovetov Samara)
61	MF	RUS	Dmitri Kirillov
69	DF	RUS	Vladislav Nikitin (April 2015)
72	DF	RUS	Stanislav Mareyev (from LFK Lokomotiv Moscow)
75	DF	RUS	Andrei Vasilyev (from Rostov)
82	MF	RUS	Igor Drykov (free agent, until April 2015 to CSKA Moscow)
84	DF	RUS	Feliks Shalimov
85	GK	RUS	Yaroslav Burychenkov (own academy, April 2015)
86	GK	RUS	Sergei Lazarev (own academy, April 2015)
89	FW	RUS	Yevgeni Markov (end of loan to Yenisey Krasnoyarsk)
91	FW	RUS	Yegor Denisov
93	GK	RUS	Mikhail Kizeyev
98	FW	RUS	Yevgeni Reutov

Out: Note: Flags indicate national team as defined under FIFA eligibility rules; some limited exceptions apply. Players may hold more than one non-FIFA nationality.

No.	Pos.	Nation	Player
3	DF	ARG	Cristian Ansaldi (on loan to (Italy) Genoa, previously on loan to (Spain) Atlético Madrid)
8	MF	RUS	Pavel Mogilevets (on loan to FC Rostov)
10	MF	RUS	Andrei Arshavin (to Kuban Krasnodar)
23	FW	VEN	Salomón Rondón (to (England) West Bromwich Albion)
33	DF	SRB	Milan Rodić (to Krylia Sovetov Samara)
34	FW	RUS	Maximilian Pronichev (on loan to (Germany) Schalke 04)
39	DF	RUS	Dmitri Skopintsev (to (Germany) RB Leipzig)
40	DF	RUS	Pavel Barbashov
41	DF	RUS	Andrei Yakovlev (to (Czech Republic) Baumit Jablonec)
42	DF	RUS	Danila Davidenko
44	MF	UKR	Anatoliy Tymoshchuk (to (Kazakhstan) Kairat Almaty)
46	MF	RUS	Zakhar Dilanyan (to (Armenia) Ulisses Yerevan)
48	FW	RUS	Aleksei Gasilin (on loan to (Germany) Schalke 04)
56	DF	RUS	Kirill Kostin
57	DF	RUS	Dzhamaldin Khodzhaniyazov (to (Denmark) AGF Aarhus)
59	MF	RUS	Aleksei Yegorov
60	MF	RUS	Yevgeni Serenkov
61	GK	RUS	Anton Tsvetkov (to Dynamo Saint Petersburg)
72	DF	RUS	Stepan Zhalobkov
77	FW	MNE	Luka Đorđević (on loan to (Spain) Ponferradina, previously on loan at (Italy) Sampdoria)
78	DF	RUS	Dmitri Chistyakov (on loan to (Armenia) Mika)
82	FW	RUS	Aleksei Makarov
83	GK	RUS	Igor Obukhov (to FC Zenit-2 St. Petersburg)
84	DF	RUS	Mikhail Kovalenko (to Dynamo Saint Petersburg)
90	FW	RUS	Ramil Sheydayev (on loan to Rubin Kazan)
98	FW	RUS	Yevgeni Kozlov (to Dynamo Saint Petersburg)
97	MF	RUS	Dmitri Khodakovsky
—	DF	RUS	Yevgeni Alfyorov (released, previously on loan to Arsenal Tula)
—	DF	RUS	Denis Terentyev (to FC Rostov, previously on loan to Tom Tomsk)
—	MF	RUS	Aleksei Kayukov (to Dynamo Saint Petersburg, previously on loan to Tom-2 Tomsk)
