= 2014–15 FC Rostov season =

FC Rostov
2014–15 season
- Chairman: Viktor Goncharov
- Manager: Miodrag Božović (till 25 September 2014); Igor Gamula (25 September-18 December 2014); Kurban Berdyev (from 18 December 2014)
- Stadium: Olimp – 2
- Russian Premier League: 14th
- Relegation play-offs: Winners vs Tosno
- Russian Cup: Round of 32 vs Syzran-2003
- Europa League: Play-off Round vs Trabzonspor
- Top goalscorer: League: Maksim Grigoryev (5); All: Vitali Dyakov (7)
Home colours	Away colours

The 2014–15 FC Rostov season was the sixth successive season that the club will play in the Russian Premier League, the highest tier of association football in Russia. Rostov will also take part in the Russian Cup and the Europa League, their first European campaign since 2000, entering at the Play-off round.

On 25 September 2014, Miodrag Božović resigned as the club's manager, with Igor Gamula appointed as his replacement. Following Rostov's 1-0 win over FC Ural, Gamula became involved in a racism row following question to the possibility of Rostov signing Benoit Angbwa, saying that six "dark-skinned players" was sufficient for the team. On 12 November Gamula was handed a 5-Game ban following his remarks.

On 18 December, Gamula was moved to Youth Team 21 manager, with Kurban Berdyev being appointed as the new manager of the first team.

== Squad ==
Note: Flags indicate national team as defined under FIFA eligibility rules; some limited exceptions apply. Players may hold more than one non-FIFA nationality.

No.	Pos.	Nation	Player
1	GK	CRO	Stipe Pletikosa (captain)
2	MF	BLR	Timofei Kalachev
3	DF	RUS	Vladimir Granat (on loan from Dynamo Moscow)
4	MF	RUS	Dmitri Torbinski
5	DF	RUS	Vitali Dyakov
6	MF	RUS	Aleksei Rebko
7	MF	RUS	Maksim Grigoryev (on loan from Lokomotiv Moscow)
8	MF	MLI	Moussa Doumbia
9	MF	GAB	Guélor Kanga
10	FW	KOR	Yoo Byung-Soo
11	FW	RUS	Aleksandr Bukharov
12	GK	RUS	Nikita Chagrov
14	FW	RUS	Dmitry Poloz
15	DF	BLR	Maksim Bardachow (loan from Tom Tomsk)
16	MF	MDA	Mihai Plătică
17	MF	TKM	Vahyt Orazsahedov
19	DF	CRO	Hrvoje Milić

No.	Pos.	Nation	Player
20	FW	IRI	Sardar Azmoun (loan from Rubin Kazan)
22	FW	RUS	Artem Dzyuba (loan from Spartak Moscow)
23	MF	RUS	Aleksandr Troshechkin
25	DF	RUS	Ivan Novoseltsev
27	DF	CIV	Igor Lolo
35	GK	RUS	Soslan Dzhanayev
55	DF	RSA	Siyanda Xulu
71	MF	RUS	Said-Ali Akhmayev
73	FW	RUS	Aleksei Grechkin
77	DF	ANG	Bastos
84	MF	MDA	Alexandru Gațcan
88	FW	LTU	Edgaras Česnauskis
91	FW	RUS	Danila Khakhalev
96	MF	RUS	Aleksandr Yuryev
97	GK	RUS	Yevgeni Goshev
99	FW	SRB	Nemanja Nikolić

=== Out on loan ===
Note: Flags indicate national team as defined under FIFA eligibility rules; some limited exceptions apply. Players may hold more than one non-FIFA nationality.

No.	Pos.	Nation	Player
3	DF	RUS	Ruslan Abazov (at Tyumen)
17	MF	RUS	Nika Chkhapeliya (at Zenit Penza)
18	MF	RUS	Azim Fatullayev (at Tosno)
22	MF	RUS	Igor Kireyev (at Amkar Perm)
34	DF	RUS	Timofei Margasov (at Sibir Novosibirsk)

No.	Pos.	Nation	Player
97	MF	RUS	Ivan Baklanov (at Arsenal Tula)
—	DF	RUS	Temur Mustafin (at Avangard Kursk)
—	MF	RUS	Khoren Bayramyan (at Volgar Astrakhan)
—	MF	RUS	Sergey Belousov (at Sokol Saratov)

=== Reserve squad ===
Note: Flags indicate national team as defined under FIFA eligibility rules; some limited exceptions apply. Players may hold more than one non-FIFA nationality.

No.	Pos.	Nation	Player
30	FW	RUS	Aleksandr Stepanov
32	MF	RUS	Artyom Linchenko
35	FW	RUS	Daniil Ostapenko
37	MF	RUS	Aleksandr Kogoniya
39	DF	RUS	Andrei Demchenko
44	DF	RUS	Anton Smirnov
45	DF	RUS	Anton Lazutkin
46	DF	RUS	Nikita Kovalyov
47	MF	RUS	Andrei Sidenko
48	MF	RUS	Dmitri Mutyev
49	FW	RUS	Gennadi Kozlov

No.	Pos.	Nation	Player
53	MF	RUS	Dmitri Khristis
54	DF	RUS	Konstantin Kulabukhov
56	MF	RUS	Vladislav Kamilov
57	MF	RUS	Ruslan Shapovalov
58	MF	RUS	Dmitri Kartashov
62	GK	RUS	Vladislav Suslov
64	FW	RUS	Andrei Fandeyev
68	DF	RUS	Andrei Zotov
71	MF	RUS	Maksim Miroshnichenko
73	DF	RUS	Aleksandr Logunov

== Transfers ==
=== Summer ===
In: Note: Flags indicate national team as defined under FIFA eligibility rules; some limited exceptions apply. Players may hold more than one non-FIFA nationality.

No.	Pos.	Nation	Player
3	DF	RUS	Ruslan Abazov (from (Russia) Spartak Nalchik)
4	MF	RUS	Dmitri Torbinski (from (Russia) Rubin Kazan)
6	MF	RUS	Aleksei Rebko (from (Russia) Amkar Perm)
7	MF	RUS	Maksim Grigoryev (loan from (Russia) Lokomotiv Moscow)
8	MF	MLI	Moussa Doumbia (from (Mali) Real Bamako)
11	FW	RUS	Aleksandr Bukharov (from (Russia) Zenit St.Petersburg, previously on loan to Anzhi Makhachkala)
15	DF	BLR	Maksim Bardachow (loan from (Russia) Tom Tomsk)
17	MF	RUS	Nika Chkhapeliya (from (Russia) Krasnodar)
20	DF	HAI	Réginal Goreux (from (Russia) Krylia Sovetov)
22	MF	RUS	Igor Kireyev (end of loan to (Russia) Spartak Nalchik)
23	MF	RUS	Aleksandr Troshechkin (from (Russia) Anzhi Makhachkala)
35	GK	RUS	Soslan Dzhanayev (from (Russia) Spartak Moscow)
69	FW	CZE	Jan Holenda (end of loan to (Russia) Tom Tomsk)
—	MF	RUS	Khoren Bayramyan (end of loan to (Russia) Rotor Volgograd)
—	MF	RUS	Nikita Vasilyev (end of loan to (Russia) Torpedo Moscow)

Out: Note: Flags indicate national team as defined under FIFA eligibility rules; some limited exceptions apply. Players may hold more than one non-FIFA nationality.

No.	Pos.	Nation	Player
7	MF	RUS	Georgy Gabulov (to (Russia) Krylia Sovetov)
8	MF	UKR	Ihor Khudobyak (end of loan from (Ukraine) Karpaty Lviv)
10	FW	RUS	Artyom Dzyuba (end of loan from (Russia) Spartak Moscow)
12	GK	RUS	Artyom Orsayev
13	GK	BLR	Anton Amelchenko
17	MF	RUS	Aleksandr Vasilyev (to (Russia) Ufa, previously on loan to (Russia) Sibir Novosibirsk)
22	MF	RUS	Igor Kireyev (loan to (Russia) Amkar Perm)
24	FW	FRA	Florent Sinama Pongolle (to (United States) Chicago Fire)
25	DF	RUS	Arseniy Logashov (end of loan from (Russia) Lokomotiv Moscow)
33	MF	RUS	Roman Yemelyanov (end of loan from (Ukraine) Shakhtar Donetsk)
34	DF	RUS	Timofei Margasov (loan to (Russia) Sibir Novosibirsk)
42	MF	RUS	Artyom Kulishev (to (Russia) Vityaz Podolsk)
49	MF	GEO	Jano Ananidze (end of loan from (Russia) Spartak Moscow)
79	MF	RUS	Nikita Mitin (to (Russia) Spartak Nalchik)
97	MF	RUS	Ivan Baklanov (loan to (Russia) Arsenal Tula)
—	MF	RUS	Sergey Belousov (loan to (Russia) Sokol Saratov, previously at (Russia) Shinnik Yaroslavl)
—	DF	RUS	Temur Mustafin (loan to (Russia) Avangard Kursk)
—	DF	SVK	Kornel Saláta (released, previously on loan to (Russia) Tom Tomsk)
—	MF	RUS	Khoren Bayramyan (loan to (Russia) Volgar Astrakhan)
—	MF	RUS	Nikita Vasilyev (to (Russia) Kaluga)
—	FW	CZE	Jan Holenda (to (Czech Republic) Viktoria Plzeň)

=== Winter ===
In: Note: Flags indicate national team as defined under FIFA eligibility rules; some limited exceptions apply. Players may hold more than one non-FIFA nationality.

No.	Pos.	Nation	Player
3	DF	RUS	Vladimir Granat (loan from (Russia) Dynamo Moscow)
17	MF	TKM	Vahyt Orazsahedov (from (Turkey) Osmanlıspor)
16	MF	MDA	Mihai Plătică (from (Moldova) Zimbru Chișinău)
20	FW	IRI	Sardar Azmoun (on loan from (Russia) Rubin Kazan)
22	FW	RUS	Artem Dzyuba (loan from (Russia) Spartak Moscow)
25	DF	RUS	Ivan Novoseltsev (to (Russia) Torpedo Moscow)
71	MF	RUS	Said-Ali Akhmayev (from (Russia) Spartak Moscow)
73	FW	RUS	Aleksei Grechkin (from (Russia) Spartak Moscow)
91	FW	RUS	Danila Khakhalev (from (Russia) Rostov-M-2 Rostov-on-Don)
96	MF	RUS	Aleksandr Yuryev (from (Russia) Spartak Moscow)
97	GK	RUS	Yevgeni Goshev (from (Russia) Rostov-M-2 Rostov-on-Don)

Out: Note: Flags indicate national team as defined under FIFA eligibility rules; some limited exceptions apply. Players may hold more than one non-FIFA nationality.

No.	Pos.	Nation	Player
3	DF	RUS	Ruslan Abazov (loan to (Russia) Tyumen)
17	MF	RUS	Nika Chkhapeliya (loan to (Russia) Zenit Penza)
18	MF	RUS	Azim Fatullayev (loan to (Russia) Tosno)
20	DF	HAI	Réginal Goreux

== Friendlies ==
26 June 2014	Allerheiligen (Austria)	0 – 1	(Russia) Rostov	Allerheiligen, Austria
20:30 MSK (UTC+4)		Report	Holenda 81'	Stadium: Stadium Park

1 July 2014	Dinamo Zagreb (Croatia)	1 – 1	(Russia) Rostov	Murska Sobota, Slovenia
20:00 MSK (UTC+4)	Goal	Report	A.Troshechkin 57'	Stadium: Fazanerija City Stadium

16 July 2014	Baumit Jablonec (Czech Republic)	2 – 0	(Russia) Rostov	Leoben, Austria
20:30 MSK (UTC+4)	2'; Doležal 41'	Report		Stadium: Donawitz Stadium

19 July 2014	Greuther Fürth (Germany)	2 – 1	(Russia) Rostov	Leoben, Austria
20:00 MSK (UTC+4)	Weilandt 43'; Jules 80'	Report	Chhapeliya	Stadium: Donawitz Stadium

22 July 2014	Velež Mostar (Bosnia and Herzegovina)	0 – 1	(Russia) Rostov	Leoben, Austria
20:00 MSK (UTC+4)		Report	Bukharov 5'	Stadium: Donawitz Stadium

21 January 2015	Foolad (Iran)	0 – 0	(Russia) Rostov	Dubai, United Arab Emirates
20:00 MSK (UTC+4)	Xulu (yellow card) 31'; Nikolić (yellow card) 76'	Report		Stadium: Sports City; Referee: Abdullah Al-Balushi (Oman)

27 January 2015	Jeonbuk Hyundai Motors (South Korea)	4 – 0	(Russia) Rostov	Dubai, United Arab Emirates
14:00 MSK (UTC+4)	Dyakov 22' (o.g.); Eninho 25'; Edu 38'; Lee Dong-gook 51'	Report		Stadium: Sports City

5 February 2015	Tosno	0 – 0	Rostov	Belek, Turkey
18:00 MSK (UTC+4)	Zaytsev (yellow card) 30'	Report	Abazov (yellow card) 90'	Stadium: Cornelia Diamond; Referee: Gyuksar Krikolu (Turkey)

7 February 2015	Jagodina (Serbia)	0 – 2	(Russia) Rostov	Belek, Turkey
17:00 MSK (UTC+4)	Yoo Byung-soo 73'; Doumbia 80'; Milić (yellow card) 90+1'	Report		Stadium: Cornelia Diamond; Referee: Jan Dzhigan (Turkey)

9 February 2015	Ulisses (Armenia)	0 – 4	(Russia) Rostov	Belek, Turkey
13:00 MSK (UTC+4)		Report	Gațcan (yellow card) 44'; Poloz 47', 61', 88'; Doumbia 57'	Stadium: Cornelia Diamond; Referee: Equis Mehmet

11 February 2015	Dacia Chișinău (Moldova)	0 – 1	(Russia) Rostov	Belek, Turkey
12:00 MSK (UTC+4)		Report	Dyakov 59' (pen.)	Stadium: Cornelia Diamond; Referee: Gediminas Mažeika

20 February 2015	Qizilqum Zarafshon (Uzbekistan)	0 – 4	(Russia) Rostov	Belek, Turkey
18:00 MSK (UTC+4)		Report	Doumbia 15'; Grigoryev 54'; Bukharov 59', 62'	Stadium: Regnum Carya; Referee: Artem Gutowsk

22 February 2015	Atyrau (Kazakhstan)	0 – 3	(Russia) Rostov	Belek, Turkey
18:00 MSK (UTC+4)		Report	Bukharov 37', 62'; Grigoryev 62', 68'	Stadium: Regnum Carya; Referee: Taulyus Karka

25 February 2015	Viborg (Denmark)	1 – 2	(Russia) Rostov	Belek, Turkey
18:00 MSK (UTC+4)	Gotfredsen 65'	Report	Bukharov 52'; Kanga 86'	Stadium: Regnum Carya; Referee: Aidi Mehmet

28 February 2015	BATE Borisov (Belarus)	0 – 1	(Russia) Rostov	Belek, Turkey
13:00 MSK (UTC+4)		Report	Bukharov 11'	Stadium: Regnum Carya; Referee: Ali Oskan

== Competitions ==
=== Russian Super Cup ===
26 July 2013	CSKA Moscow	3 – 1	Rostov	Krasnodar
21:30 MSK (UTC+4)	Wernbloom 56'; Tošić 74'; Doumbia 90'	Summary	Milić 37'; Gațcan (yellow card) 53' (yellow-red card) 61'; Kanga (yellow card) 62' (yellow-red card) 63'	Stadium: Kuban Stadium; Attendance: 6,400; Referee: Alexey Nikolaev

=== Russian Premier League ===
==== Results by round ====
Round	1	2	3	4	5	6	7	8	9	10	11	12	13	14	15	16	17	18	19	20	21	22	23	24	25	26	27	28	29	30
Ground	A	A	A	H	H	A	H	H	A	A	A	H	A	A	H	A	H	H	H	A	A	H	H	H	H	H	A	A	A	H
Result	L	D	L	L	W	L	L	L	L	D	L	W	D	L	D	D	L	L	W	L	W	W	W	W	D	L	L	D	L	D
Position	13	12	15	15	10	13	13	14	14	15	15	14	14	15	15	15	16	16	16	16	14	12	12	10	11	11	11	12	13	14

Updated to match(es) played on 30 May 2015. Source: Russian Premier League
A = Away; H = Home; W = Win; D = Draw; L = Loss

==== Matches ====
3 August 2014 1	Dynamo Moscow	7 – 3	Rostov	Moscow
16:30 MSK (UTC+4)	Kurányi 15' (pen.), 66'; Samba 29'; Dzsudzsák 37'; Kokorin 43' (pen.), 48', 61'	Summary	Poloz 35', 40'; Gațcan 90'	Stadium: Arena Khimki; Attendance: 3,520; Referee: Mikhail Vilkov

8 August 2014 2	Kuban Krasnodar	2 – 2	Rostov	Krasnodar
20:30 MSK (UTC+4)	Popov 6', 65' (pen.)	Summary	Kalachev 25'; Dyakov 90+2'	Stadium: Kuban Stadium; Attendance: 6,000; Referee: Sergey Karasev

14 August 2014 3	Lokomotiv Moscow	2 – 1	Rostov	Moscow
18:30 MSK (UTC+4)	Kasaev 5'; Samedov 21'; Ćorluka (red card) 70'	Summary	Kalachev (red card) 45+2'; Poloz 72' (pen.)	Stadium: Lokomotiv Stadium; Attendance: 11,200; Referee: Kirill Levnikov

17 August 2014 4	Rostov	0 – 2	Krasnodar	Rostov-on-Don
21:00 MSK (UTC+4)		Summary	Joãozinho 21'; Ahmedov 58'	Stadium: Olimp-2; Attendance: 8,000; Referee: Igor Nizovtsev

24 August 2014 5	Rostov	2 – 1	Mordovia Saransk	Rostov-on-Don
21:30 MSK (UTC+4)	Grigoryev 80'; Kanga 81'	Summary	Donald 61'	Stadium: Olimp-2; Attendance: 8,500; Referee: Vitaly Meshkov

31 August 2014 6	CSKA Moscow	6 – 0	Rostov	Moscow
13:30 MSK (UTC+4)	Natcho 42' (pen.), 54', 90+1'; Musa 52', 59'; Eremenko 65'	Summary		Stadium: Arena Khimki; Attendance: 14,000; Referee: Sergey Lapochkin

13 September 2014 7	Rostov	1 – 2	Rubin Kazan'	Rostov-on-Don
21:00 MSK (UTC+4)	Grigoryev 9'	Summary	Portnyagin 11', 37'	Stadium: Olimp-2; Attendance: 8,100; Referee: Vladislav Bezborodov

20 September 2014 8	Rostov	0 – 5	Zenit St.Petersburg	Rostov-on-Don
14:30 MSK (UTC+4)		Summary	Rondón 11', 57', 73'; Xulu 37' (o.g.); Dyakov 72' (o.g.)	Stadium: Olimp-2; Attendance: 14,253; Referee: Igor Fedotov

28 September 2014 9	Terek Grozny	2 – 1	Rostov	Grozny
21:00 MSK (UTC+4)	Rybus 21'; Utsiev 78'	Summary	Grigoryev 23'; Goreux (yellow card) 32' (yellow-red card) 59'	Stadium: Akhmat-Arena; Attendance: 17,230; Referee: Sergey Karasev

19 October 2014 10	Arsenal Tula	1 – 1	Rostov	Tula
16:30 MSK (UTC+4)	Maloyan 57'	Summary	Bukharov 33'	Stadium: Arsenal Stadium; Attendance: 8,500; Referee: Aleksei Matyunin

25 October 2014 11	Amkar Perm'	2 – 0	Rostov	Perm
14:00 MSK (UTC+4)	Ogude 16'; Kolomeytsev 84'	Summary		Stadium: Zvezda Stadium; Attendance: 5,200; Referee: Kirill Levnikov

31 October 2014 12	Rostov	1 – 0	Ural	Rostov-on-Don
19:00 MSK (UTC+3)	Poloz 3'	Summary		Stadium: Olimp-2; Attendance: 5,100; Referee: Sergey Lapochkin

9 November 2014 13	Ufa	0 – 0	Rostov	Perm
15:00 MSK (UTC+3)		Summary		Stadium: Zvezda Stadium; Attendance: 400; Referee: Alexey Nikolaev

22 November 2014 14	Torpedo Moscow	2 – 1	Rostov	Ramensky District
14:15 MSK (UTC+3)	Stevanović 22'; Salugin 52'; Rykov (yellow card) 89'	Summary	Goreux (yellow card) 10'; Torbinski 90'; Doumbia (yellow card) 90+3'	Stadium: Saturn Stadium; Attendance: 4,200; Referee: Mikhail Vilkov

28 November 2014 15	Rostov	1 – 1	Amkar Perm'	Rostov-on-Don
19:00 MSK (UTC+3)	Bukharov 41' (pen.)	Summary	Gol (yellow card) 8' (goal) 11'; Cherenchikov (yellow card) 20' (yellow-red card) 87'; Balanovich (yellow card) 56'; Gerus (yellow card) 90+1'	Stadium: Olimp-2; Attendance: 3,505; Referee: Vladmir Moskalev

4 December 2014 16	Spartak Moscow	1 – 1	Rostov	Moscow
19:45 MSK (UTC+3)	Glushakov 75'; Ebert (yellow card) 76'	Summary	Kanga (yellow card) 34'; Torbinski 71'	Stadium: Otkrytie Arena; Attendance: 10,000; Referee: Sergey Kulikov

8 December 2014 17	Rostov	0 – 1	Arsenal Tula	Rostov-on-Don
19:00 MSK (UTC+3)	Goreux (yellow card) 30'; Bastos (yellow card) 46'; Dyakov (yellow card) 52'	Summary	Ryzhkov (yellow card) 16' (yellow-red card) 90+5'; Kašćelan 34'; Sukharev (yellow card) 39'	Stadium: Olimp-2; Attendance: 5,400; Referee: Aleksei Matyunin

8 March 2015 18	Rostov	0 – 1	Lokomotiv Moscow	Rostov-on-Don
18:30 MSK (UTC+3)	Kalachev (yellow card) 23'; Doumbia (yellow card) 24'; Azmoun (yellow card) 83'	Summary	Fernandes (yellow card) 27'; Tarasov (yellow card) 54'; Škuletić 64'; Samedov (yellow card) 83'; Maicon (yellow card) 87'	Stadium: Olimp-2; Attendance: 13,000; Referee: Aleksandr Egorov

16 March 2015 19	Rostov	2 – 1	Kuban Krasnodar	Rostov-on-Don
19:00 MSK (UTC+3)	Torbinski (yellow card) 25'; Bukharov 51'; Bastos (yellow card) 61'; Kalachev (yellow card) 71'; Doumbia (yellow card) 84'; Azmoun 87' (yellow card) 88'	Summary	Šunjić (yellow card) 19'; Sosnin (yellow card) 50'; Almeida 79'; Yeshchenko (yellow card) 83'	Stadium: Olimp-2; Attendance: 11,000; Referee: Vladimir Moskalyov

21 March 2015 20	Rubin Kazan'	2 – 0	Rostov	Kazan
14:15 MSK (UTC+3)	Nabiullin (yellow card) 25'; Portnyagin 84'; Kuzmin (yellow card) 85'; Ozdoyev (yellow card) 90+2'	Summary	Gațcan (yellow card) 21'; Kalachev (yellow card) 27'; Dyakov (yellow card) 69'	Stadium: Kazan Arena; Attendance: 5,027; Referee: Alexey Nikolaev

5 April 2015 21	Ural	0 – 1	Rostov	Yekaterinburg
15:45 MSK (UTC+3)	Acevedo (yellow card) 58'; Yemelyanov (yellow card) 72'; Smolov (yellow card) 73'	Summary	Novoseltsev (yellow card) 23'; Dzyuba 77'	Stadium: Central Stadium; Attendance: 2,840; Referee: Mikhail Vilkov

9 April 2015 22	Rostov	2 – 0	Ufa	Rostov-on-Don
20:00 MSK (UTC+3)	Bukharov (yellow card) 73' (goal) 88'; Azmoun 78'	Summary	Zaseyev (yellow card) 55'; Sukhov (yellow card) 62'; Paurević (yellow card) 75'	Stadium: Olimp-2; Attendance: 7,000; Referee: Sergey Lapochkin

13 April 2015 23	Rostov	2 – 1	Spartak Moscow	Rostov-on-Don
19:30 MSK (UTC+3)	Kanga (yellow card) 15'; Grigoryev 35', 82'	Summary	Insaurralde 37'; Promes (yellow card) 51'; Källström (yellow card) 54'; Kombarov (yellow card) 84'; Bryzgalov (yellow card) 90'; Glushakov (yellow card) 90+3'	Stadium: Olimp-2; Attendance: 15,710; Referee: Vladislav Bezborodov

20 April 2015 24	Rostov	1 – 0	Torpedo Moscow	Rostov-on-Don
19:30 MSK (UTC+3)	Dyakov 78' (pen.); Gațcan (yellow card) 86'; Torbinski (yellow card) 87'; Azmoun (yellow card) 90+3'	Summary	Katsalapov (yellow card) 35'; Putsila (yellow card) 40'; Kokoszka (yellow card) 72'; Rykov (yellow card) 77'; Mirzov (yellow card) 77'	Stadium: Olimp-2; Attendance: 6,015; Referee: Mikhail Vilkov

26 April 2015 25	Rostov	2 – 2	Dynamo Moscow	Rostov-on-Don
16:00 MSK (UTC+3)	Bastos (yellow card) 43' (goal) 80'; Azmoun 51'; Torbinski (yellow card) 73'; Gațcan (yellow card) 90+2'	Summary	Kokorin 21'; Zhirkov (yellow card) 55'; Samba 77'; Valbuena (yellow card) 90+1' Zobnin (yellow card) 90+5'	Stadium: Olimp-2; Attendance: 14,320; Referee: Igor Nizovtsev

2 May 2015 26	Rostov	0 – 1	Terek Grozny	Rostov-on-Don
19:00 MSK (UTC+3)	Torbinski (yellow card) 66'; Grigoryev (yellow card) 67'; Gațcan (yellow card) 78'; Bardachow (yellow card) 84'; Novoseltsev (yellow card) 88'	Summary	Kuzyayev (yellow card) 14'; Rybus (yellow card) 28'; Rodolfo (yellow card) 52'; Mbengue 83'	Stadium: Olimp-2; Attendance: 12,325; Referee: Alexey Nikolaev

10 May 2015 27	Zenit St. Petersburg	3 – 0	Rostov	Saint Petersburg
18:30 MSK (UTC+3)	Shatov 45'; Hulk 45+3'; Lodygin (yellow card) 62'; Rondón 87' (yellow card) 88'	Summary	Bardachow (yellow card) 9'; Kanga (yellow card) 11'; Kalachev (yellow card) 34'; Dyakov (yellow card) 45+3'; Rebko (yellow card) 88'	Stadium: Petrovsky Stadium; Attendance: 17,831; Referee: Sergey Kulikov

15 May 2015 28	Mordovia Saransk	0 – 0	Rostov	Saransk
19:00 MSK (UTC+3)	Shitov (yellow card) 19'; Vlasov (yellow card) 35'; Le Tallec (yellow card) 81'; Yakovlev (yellow card) 90+4'	Summary	Gațcan (yellow card) 25'; Azmoun (yellow card) 90+2'	Stadium: Start Stadium; Attendance: 4,315; Referee: Sergey Karasev

24 May 2015 29	Krasnodar	2 – 1	Rostov	Krasnodar
13:30 MSK (UTC+3)	Shirokov 10'; Wánderson 33'; Bystrov (yellow card) 85'; Laborde (yellow card) 90+2'	Summary	Kanga (yellow card) 29'; Bardachow (yellow card) 57'; Novoseltsev (yellow card) 66'; Azmoun (yellow card) 68'; Dyakov 75'; Doumbia (yellow card) 81'	Stadium: Kuban Stadium; Attendance: 10,900; Referee: Mikhail Vilkov

30 May 2015 30	Rostov	1 – 1	CSKA Moscow	Rostov-on-Don
13:30 MSK (UTC+3)	Kanga (yellow card) 43'; Dyakov 45' (pen.); Pletikosa (yellow card) 87'	Summary	Ignashevich (yellow card) 45'; Natcho (yellow card) 85'; Wernbloom 88'	Stadium: Olimp-2; Attendance: 15,500; Referee: Vitaly Meshkov

==== League table ====
Pos	Team	Pld	W	D	L	GF	GA	GD	Pts	Qualification or relegation
12	Ufa	30	7	10	13	26	39	−13	31	
13	Ural Sverdlovsk Oblast (O)	30	9	3	18	31	44	−13	30	Qualification for the Relegation play-offs
14	Rostov (O)	30	7	8	15	27	51	−24	29	Qualification for the Relegation play-offs
15	Torpedo Moscow (R)	30	6	11	13	28	45	−17	29	Relegation to Professional Football League
16	Arsenal Tula (R)	30	7	4	19	20	46	−26	25	Relegation to Football National League

Source: Russian Premier League
Rules for classification: 1) points; 2) number of matches won; 3) head-to-head points; 4) head-to-head wins; 5) head-to-head goal difference; 6) head-to-head goals; 7) number of head-to-head away goals; 8) goal difference; 9) number of goals scored; 10) number of away goals scored
(O) Play-off winners; (R) Relegated

==== Relegation play-offs ====
3 June 2015 1st Leg	Tosno	0 – 1	Rostov	Tikhvin
18:30 MSK (UTC+3)	Zaytsev (yellow card) 60'; Romanenko (yellow card) 83'	Summary	Bukharov 88'	Stadium: Stadion Kirovets; Attendance: 3,100; Referee: Mikhail Vilkov

7 June 2015 2nd Leg	Rostov	4 – 1 (5 – 1 agg.)	Tosno	Rostov-on-Don
20:00 MSK (UTC+3)	Dyakov 39', 59', 62' (pen.); Azmoun 88'	Summary	Prokofyev 6'	Stadium: Olimp-2; Attendance: 15,025; Referee: Sergey Karasev

=== Russian Cup ===
24 September 2014 Round of 32	Syzran-2003	2 – 0	Rostov	Syzran
19:00 MSK (UTC+4)	Churavtsev 80'; Baratov 84'	Summary		Stadium: Kristall Stadium; Attendance: 2,070; Referee: Stanislav Vasilyev

=== UEFA Europa League ===
==== Qualifying phase ====
21 August 2014 Play-off round 1st leg	Trabzonspor (Turkey)	2 – 0	(Russia) Rostov	Trabzon, Turkey
22:00 MSK (UTC+4)	Medjani 37'; Erdoğan (yellow card) 62'; Nizam (yellow card) 69'; Cardozo 73'	Report	Bastos (yellow card) 40'; Gațcan (yellow card) 69'	Stadium: Hüseyin Avni Aker Stadium; Attendance: 6,101; Referee: Gediminas Mažeika (Lithuania)

28 August 2014 Play-off round 2nd leg	Rostov (Russia)	0 – 0 (0 – 2 agg.)	(Turkey) Trabzonspor	Rostov-on-Don, Russia
21:00 MSK (UTC+4)	Torbinski (yellow card) 12'; Kalachev (yellow card) 44'	Report	Belkalem (yellow card) 10'; Dursun (yellow card) 59'; B.Artarslan (yellow card) 88'	Stadium: Olimp-2; Attendance: 14,950; Referee: Felix Zwayer (Germany)

== Squad statistics ==
As of match played 7 June 2015

=== Appearances and goals ===
No.	Pos	Nat	Player	Total		Premier League		Russian Cup		Europa League		Super Cup	
No.	Pos	Nat	Player	Apps	Goals	Apps	Goals	Apps	Goals	Apps	Goals	Apps	Goals
1	GK	(Croatia) CRO	Stipe Pletikosa	35	0	32	0	0	0	2	0	1	0
2	MF	(Belarus) BLR	Timofei Kalachev	30	1	27	1	0	0	2	0	1	0
4	DF	(Russia) RUS	Dmitri Torbinski	32	2	29	2	0	0	2	0	1	0
5	DF	(Russia) RUS	Vitali Dyakov	35	7	31	7	1	0	2	0	1	0
6	MF	(Russia) RUS	Aleksei Rebko	19	0	6+13	0	0	0	0	0	0	0
7	MF	(Russia) RUS	Maksim Grigoryev	27	5	18+6	5	1	0	2	0	0	0
8	MF	(Mali) MLI	Moussa Doumbia	23	0	8+12	0	0+1	0	0+2	0	0	0
9	MF	(Gabon) GAB	Guélor Kanga	25	1	19+2	1	1	0	2	0	1	0
10	FW	(South Korea) KOR	Yoo Byung-Soo	5	0	0+4	0	0	0	0+1	0	0	0
11	FW	(Russia) RUS	Aleksandr Bukharov	32	5	19+9	5	1	0	0+2	0	1	0
14	FW	(Russia) RUS	Dmitry Poloz	24	4	14+6	4	1	0	2	0	1	0
15	DF	(Belarus) BLR	Maksim Bardachow	21	0	17+3	0	1	0	0	0	0	0
16	MF	(Moldova) MDA	Mihai Plătică	1	0	1	0	0	0	0	0	0	0
19	DF	(Croatia) CRO	Hrvoje Milić	24	0	18+2	0	0+1	0	2	0	1	0
20	FW	(Iran) IRI	Sardar Azmoun	12	4	4+8	4	0	0	0	0	0	0
22	FW	(Russia) RUS	Artem Dzyuba	12	1	6+6	1	0	0	0	0	0	0
23	MF	(Russia) RUS	Aleksandr Troshechkin	4	0	1+2	0	1	0	0	0	0	0
25	DF	(Russia) RUS	Ivan Novoseltsev	13	0	13	0	0	0	0	0	0	0
27	DF	(Ivory Coast) CIV	Igor Lolo	9	0	9	0	0	0	0	0	0	0
35	GK	(Russia) RUS	Soslan Dzhanayev	1	0	0	0	1	0	0	0	0	0
55	DF	(South Africa) RSA	Siyanda Xulu	5	0	3+1	0	1	0	0	0	0	0
77	DF	(Angola) ANG	Bastos	32	1	28+1	1	0	0	2	0	1	0
84	MF	(Moldova) MDA	Alexandru Gațcan	31	1	27+1	1	0	0	2	0	1	0
99	FW	(Serbia) SRB	Nemanja Nikolić	2	0	0+1	0	0+1	0	0	0	0	0
Players away from the club on loan:
3	DF	(Russia) RUS	Ruslan Abazov	4	0	3	0	0	0	0	0	1	0
17	MF	(Russia) RUS	Nika Chkhapeliya	4	0	0+4	0	0	0	0	0	0	0
18	MF	(Russia) RUS	Azim Fatullayev	13	0	7+4	0	1	0	0	0	0+1	0
Players who appeared for Rostov no longer at the club:
7	MF	(Russia) RUS	Georgy Gabulov	1	0	0	0	0	0	0	0	0+1	0
20	DF	(Haiti) HAI	Réginal Goreux	17	0	13+1	0	1	0	2	0	0	0

=== Goal Scorers ===
Place	Position	Nation	Number	Name	Russian Premier League	Relegation Play-off	Russian Cup	UEFA Europa League	Russian Super Cup	Total
1	DF	(Russia)	5	Vitali Dyakov	4	3	0	0	0	7
2	MF	(Russia)	7	Maksim Grigoryev	5	0	0	0	0	5
2	FW	(Russia)	11	Aleksandr Bukharov	4	1	0	0	0	5
3	FW	(Russia)	14	Dmitry Poloz	4	0	0	0	0	4
3	FW	(Iran)	20	Sardar Azmoun	3	1	0	0	0	4
6	DF	(Russia)	4	Dmitri Torbinski	2	0	0	0	0	2
7	MF	(Moldova)	84	Alexandru Gațcan	1	0	0	0	0	1
7	MF	(Belarus)	2	Timofei Kalachev	1	0	0	0	0	1
7	MF	(Gabon)	9	Guélor Kanga	1	0	0	0	0	1
7	FW	(Russia)	22	Artem Dzyuba	1	0	0	0	0	1
7	DF	(Angola)	77	Bastos	1	0	0	0	0	1
7	DF	(Croatia)	19	Hrvoje Milić	0	0	0	0	1	1
				TOTALS	27	5	0	0	1	33

=== Disciplinary record ===
Number	Nation	Position	Name	Russian Premier League		Relegation Play-off		Russian Cup		UEFA Europa League		Russian Super Cup		Total	
Number	Nation	Position	Name	Yellow card	Red card	Yellow card	Red card	Yellow card	Red card	Yellow card	Red card	Yellow card	Red card	Yellow card	Red card
1	(Croatia)	GK	Stipe Pletikosa	2	0	0	0	0	0	0	0	0	0	2	0
2	(Belarus)	MF	Timofei Kalachev	8	1	0	0	0	0	0	0	2	0	10	1
3	(Russia)	DF	Ruslan Abazov	1	0	0	0	0	0	0	0	0	0	1	0
4	(Russia)	MF	Dmitri Torbinski	7	0	0	0	0	0	0	0	1	0	8	0
5	(Russia)	DF	Vitali Dyakov	6	0	0	0	0	0	0	0	0	0	6	0
6	(Russia)	MF	Aleksei Rebko	3	0	0	0	0	0	0	0	0	0	3	0
7	(Russia)	MF	Maksim Grigoryev	1	0	0	0	0	0	0	0	0	0	1	0
8	(Senegal)	MF	Moussa Doumbia	4	0	0	0	0	0	0	0	0	0	4	0
9	(Gabon)	MF	Guélor Kanga	6	0	0	0	0	0	0	0	2	1	8	1
11	(Russia)	FW	Aleksandr Bukharov	4	0	0	0	0	0	0	0	0	0	4	0
15	(Belarus)	DF	Maksim Bardachow	5	0	0	0	0	0	0	0	0	0	4	0
18	(Russia)	MF	Azim Fatullayev	2	0	0	0	0	0	0	0	0	0	2	0
19	(Croatia)	DF	Hrvoje Milić	1	0	0	0	0	0	0	0	0	0	1	0
20	(Haiti)	DF	Réginal Goreux	6	1	0	0	0	0	0	0	0	0	6	1
20	(Iran)	FW	Sardar Azmoun	5	0	0	0	0	0	0	0	0	0	5	0
23	(Russia)	MF	Aleksandr Troshechkin	1	0	0	0	0	0	0	0	0	0	1	0
25	(Russia)	DF	Ivan Novoseltsev	3	0	0	0	0	0	0	0	0	0	3	0
77	(Angola)	DF	Bastos	4	0	0	0	0	0	1	0	0	0	5	0
84	(Moldova)	MF	Alexandru Gațcan	8	0	0	0	0	0	1	0	2	1	11	1
			TOTALS	77	2	0	0	0	0	2	0	7	2	86	4

== Notes ==
- MSK time changed from UTC+4 to UTC+3 permanently on 26 October 2014.
