= Vasili Zapryagayev =

Russian footballer

Personal information
- Full name: Vasili Aleksandrovich Zapryagayev
- Date of birth: 18 August 1998 (age 28)
- Place of birth: Saint Petersburg, Russia
- Height: 1.84 m (6 ft 0 in)
- Position: Defender

Youth career
- –2009: Druzhba Krasnoye Selo
- 2009–2015: FC Zenit Saint Petersburg

Senior career*
Years	Team	Apps	(Gls)
2017–2019	FC Zenit-2 Saint Petersburg	24	(0)
2019–2020	FC Tom Tomsk	7	(0)
2020–2022	FC Zenit-2 Saint Petersburg	29	(2)
2023	FC Yadro Saint Petersburg	10	(0)
- * Club domestic league appearances and goals as of 3 June 2023

Vasili Aleksandrovich Zapryagayev (Russian: Василий Александрович Запрягаев; born 18 August 1998) is a Russian football player.

== Club career ==
He made his debut in the Russian Football National League for FC Zenit-2 Saint Petersburg on 8 July 2017 in a game against FC Shinnik Yaroslavl.

On 21 February 2019, he signed with FC Tom Tomsk.
