= Vladimir Granat =

Russian footballer (born 1987)

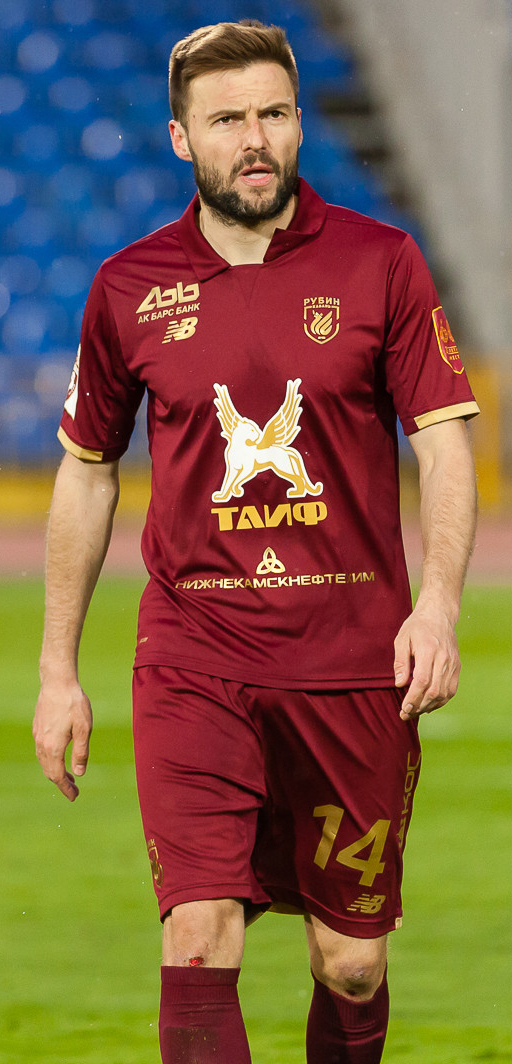
- Granat with Rubin Kazan in 2018

Personal information
- Full name: Vladimir Vasilyevich Granat
- Date of birth: 22 May 1987 (age 39)
- Place of birth: Ulan-Ude, Buryat ASSR, Russian SFSR, Soviet Union
- Height: 1.84 m (6 ft 0 in)
- Positions: Centre back; left back

Youth career
- 1994–2003: Lokomotiv Ulan-Ude
- 2003–2004: Zvezda Irkutsk

Senior career*
Years	Team	Apps	(Gls)
2004	Zvezda Irkutsk	5	(0)
2005–2015	Dynamo Moscow	190	(4)
2006	→ Sibir Novosibirsk (loan)	7	(0)
2015	→ Rostov (loan)	0	(0)
2015–2016	Spartak Moscow	14	(0)
2016	→ Spartak-2 Moscow	9	(1)
2016–2017	Rostov	12	(0)
2017–2020	Rubin Kazan	41	(0)
2021	Olimp-Dolgoprudny	7	(0)
2022	Olimp-Dolgoprudny	1	(0)
2024	Krasnoye Znamya (amateur)	0	(0)
2026	Krasnoye Znamya (amateur)	0	(0)

International career
2007–2008	Russia U-21	10	(0)
2011–2012	Russia-2	4	(0)
2012–2018	Russia	13	(1)

Managerial career
- 2025–2026: Strogino Moscow (assistant)
- * Club domestic league appearances and goals

Vladimir Vasilyevich Granat (Russian: Владимир Васильевич Гранат, IPA: [vlɐˈdʲimʲɪr vɐˈsʲilʲjɪvʲɪdʑ ɡrɐˈnat]; born 22 May 1987) is a Russian professional football coach and a former centre-back.

== Career ==
=== Club ===
On 11 May 2014, during the Russian Premier League match against Zenit St. Petersburg, Granat was attacked by a Zenit fan who had invaded the pitch, resulting in Granat being hospitalized with concussion and a broken jaw.

In March 2015, Granat agreed to move from Dynamo Moscow to rivals Spartak Moscow during the 2015 Summer transfer window.

On 10 June 2017, after one season with Rostov, he moved to Rubin Kazan.

Two years after last appearing on the field, on 18 February 2021 he joined third-tier Russian Second League club Olimp-Dolgoprudny. He left the club at the end of the 2020–21 season and then returned to it in February 2022.

=== International ===
On 11 May 2012, Granat was named in the Russia's provisional squad for the UEFA Euro 2012. It was the first time Granat had been called up to the national team. On 25 May 2012 Granat was confirmed as in the final squad for UEFA Euro 2012. Granat made his debut for the national team in the 2014 FIFA World Cup qualifying game against Luxembourg on 6 September 2013. On 2 June 2014, Granat was included in the Russia's 2014 FIFA World Cup squad. He remained on the bench in all three games Russia played at the tournament.

On 11 May 2018, he was included in Russia's extended 2018 FIFA World Cup squad. On 3 June 2018, he was included in the finalized World Cup squad. He made one appearance at the tournament as a half-time substitute in the Round of 16 defeat of Spain for injured Yuri Zhirkov.

== Personal life ==
Vladimir Granat's grandparents from father line came from Ukraine; his family name Granat is also of Eastern European Ashkenazi Jewish origin. Vladimir Granat was raised in a big family. He is married with two children.

== Career statistics ==
=== Club ===
As of 21 May 2022

Club	Season	League			Cup		Continental		Total	
Club	Season	Division	Apps	Goals	Apps	Goals	Apps	Goals	Apps	Goals
Zvezda Irkutsk	2004	Russian Second League	5	0	0	0	–		5	0
Sibir Novosibirsk (loan)	2006	Russian First League	5	0	1	0	–		6	0
Dynamo Moscow	2007	Russian Premier League	27	0	5	0	–		32	0
Dynamo Moscow	2008	Russian Premier League	11	0	0	0	–		11	0
Dynamo Moscow	2009	Russian Premier League	28	0	2	0	4 (Note: Two appearances in the UEFA Champions League, two appearances in the UEFA Europa League)	0	34	0
Dynamo Moscow	2010	Russian Premier League	22	1	2	0	–		24	1
Dynamo Moscow	2011–12	Russian Premier League	39	0	6	0	–		45	0
Dynamo Moscow	2012–13	Russian Premier League	25	1	3	0	2 (Note: Appearances in the UEFA Europa League)	0	30	1
Dynamo Moscow	2013–14	Russian Premier League	29	2	0	0	–		29	2
Dynamo Moscow	2014–15	Russian Premier League	9	0	1	0	4	0	14	0
Dynamo Moscow	Total		190	4	19	0	10	0	219	4
Rostov (loan)	2014–15	Russian Premier League	0	0	–		–		0	0
Spartak Moscow	2015–16	Russian Premier League	14	0	1	0	–		15	0
Spartak Moscow	2016–17	Russian Premier League	0	0	–		0	0	0	0
Spartak Moscow	Total		14	0	1	0	0	0	15	0
Spartak-2 Moscow	2016–17	Russian First League	9	1	–		–		9	1
Rostov	2016–17	Russian Premier League	12	0	0	0	9 (Note: Six appearances in the UEFA Champions League, three appearances in the UEFA Europa League)	0	21	0
Rubin Kazan	2017–18	Russian Premier League	27	0	1	0	–		28	0
Rubin Kazan	2018–19	Russian Premier League	14	0	4	0	–		18	0
Rubin Kazan	2019–20	Russian Premier League	0	0	0	0	–		0	0
Rubin Kazan	Total		41	0	5	0	0	0	46	0
Olimp-Dolgoprudny	2020–21	Russian Second League	7	0	–		–		7	0
Olimp-Dolgoprudny	2021–22	Russian First League	1	0	–		–		1	0
Career total			284	5	26	0	19	0	329	5

=== International ===
As of 1 July 2018

Russia
Year	Apps	Goals
2013	4	0
2014	5	1
2018	4	0
Total	13	1

=== International goals ===
#	Date	Venue	Opponent	Score	Result	Competition
1.	3 September 2014	Arena Khimki, Moscow, Russia	Azerbaijan	4–0	4–0	Friendly
