= Danil Neplyuyev =

Russian footballer

Danil Neplyuev
Personal information
- Full name: Danil Mikhailovich Neplyuev
- Date of birth: 2 January 1998 (age 28)
- Place of birth: Voronezh, Russia
- Height: 1.79 m (5 ft 10 in)
- Positions: Midfielder; defender

Youth career
- PFC CSKA Moscow

Senior career*
| Years | Team | Apps | (Gls) |
| 2018–2019 | FC Metallurg Lipetsk | 16 | (1) |
| 2019–2020 | FC Fakel Voronezh | 6 | (0) |
| 2020 | FC Avangard Kursk | 8 | (0) |
| 2021–2022 | FC Kolomna | 19 | (0) |
| 2022–2023 | FC Saturn Ramenskoye | 23 | (1) |

International career
| 2013 | Russia U-15 U-16 | 7 | (0) |
- * Club domestic league appearances and goals as of 10 June 2023

Danil Mikhailovich Neplyuev (Russian: Данил Михайлович Неплюев; born 2 January 1998) is a Russian football player.

== Club career ==
He made his debut in the Russian Professional Football League for FC Metallurg Lipetsk on 18 July 2018 in a game against FC Kvant Obninsk.

He made his Russian Football National League debut for FC Fakel Voronezh on 23 October 2019 in a game against FC Spartak-2 Moscow.
