= Nika Chkhapeliya =

Russian footballer (born 1994)

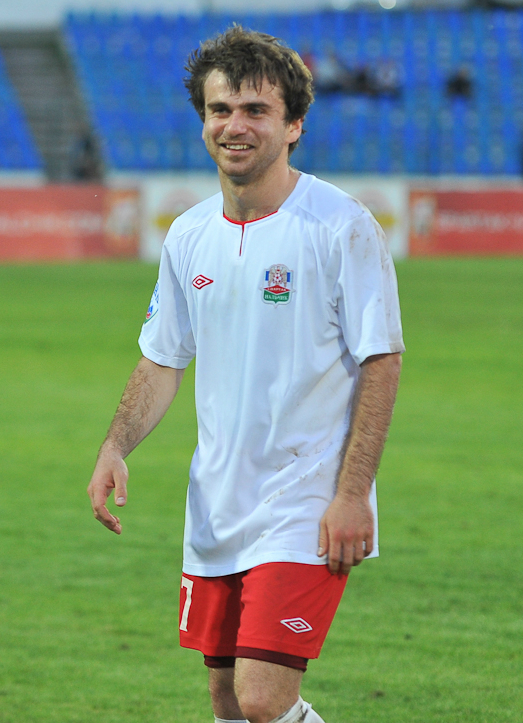

Personal information
- Full name: Nika Igorevich Chkhapeliya
- Date of birth: 26 April 1994 (age 32)
- Place of birth: Ochamchire, Georgia
- Height: 1.65 m (5 ft 5 in)
- Position: Midfielder

Youth career
- Ertsakhu Ochamchire
- ShBFR Gelendzhik

Senior career*
Years	Team	Apps	(Gls)
2010	FC Nara-ShBFR Naro-Fominsk	1	(1)
2011–2012	FC Olimpia Gelendzhik	15	(1)
2012–2014	FC Krasnodar	0	(0)
2013	→ FC Krasnodar-2	22	(1)
2014	→ PFC Spartak Nalchik (loan)	7	(0)
2014–2015	FC Rostov	4	(0)
2015	→ FC Zenit Penza (loan)	7	(0)
2015	→ FC Baltika Kaliningrad (loan)	19	(2)
2016–2017	FC Tosno	18	(3)
2017	→ PFC Spartak Nalchik (loan)	2	(0)
2017–2018	FC Fakel Voronezh	20	(2)
2018–2019	FC Dynamo Bryansk	12	(2)

International career
2011	Russia U-17	3	(0)
2014–2015	Russia U-21	8	(2)
- * Club domestic league appearances and goals

Nika Igorevich Chkhapeliya (Russian: Ника Игоревич Чхапелия, Abkhazian: Ника Игор-иҧа Чҳапелиа; born 26 April 1994) is a Russian former professional football player.
