= Vitali Dyakov =

Russian professional footballer

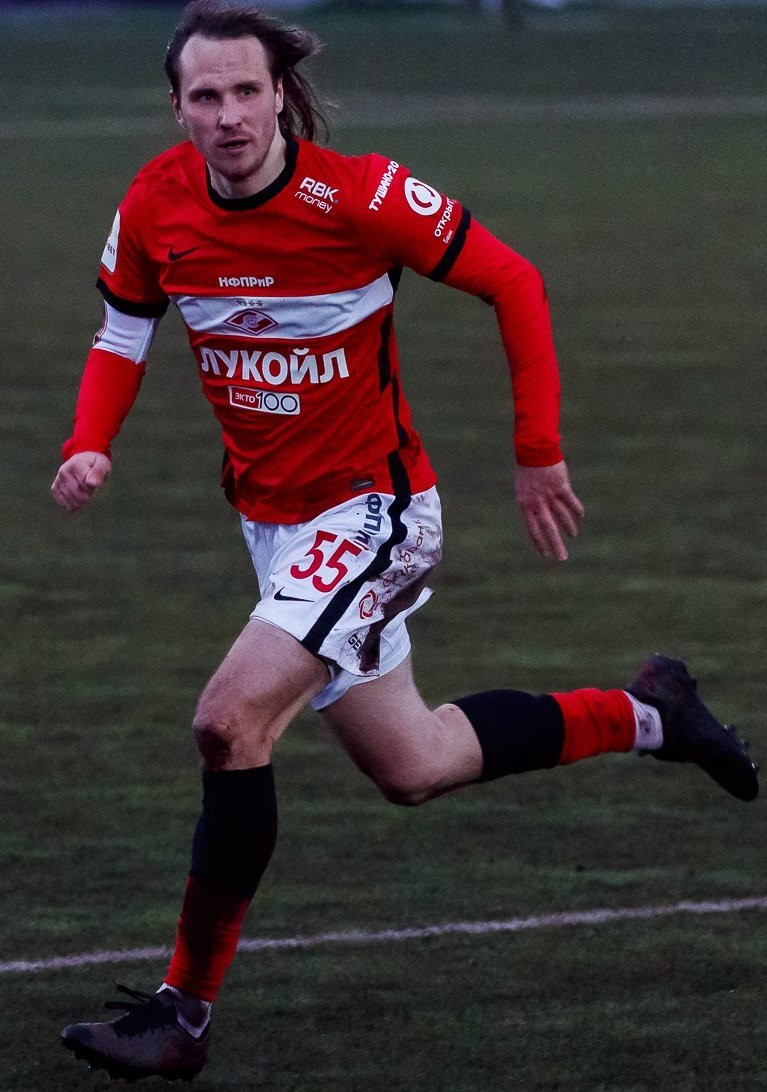
- Dyakov with Spartak-2 Moscow in 2020

Personal information
- Full name: Vitali Aleksandrovich Dyakov
- Date of birth: 31 January 1989 (age 37)
- Place of birth: Krasnodar, Russian SFSR
- Height: 1.92 m (6 ft 4 in)
- Position: Centre back

Youth career
- Kuban Krasnodar

Senior career*
Years	Team	Apps	(Gls)
2007–2011	Lokomotiv Moscow	0	(0)
2007	→ Sochi-04 (loan)	22	(3)
2008	→ Gubkin (loan)	21	(2)
2010	→ Lokomotiv-2 Moscow	24	(4)
2012–2015	Rostov	87	(10)
2015–2017	Dynamo Moscow	20	(3)
2016	→ Tom Tomsk (loan)	14	(1)
2017–2018	Sivasspor	11	(1)
2019	Dinamo Minsk	10	(1)
2020–2021	Spartak-2 Moscow	30	(4)

International career
2012	Russia-2	2	(0)
- * Club domestic league appearances and goals

Vitali Aleksandrovich Dyakov (Russian: Виталий Александрович Дьяков; born 31 January 1989) is a Russian former professional footballer.

== Career ==
He made his professional debut in the Russian Second Division in 2007 for Sochi-04.

On 14 July 2017, he signed a 2-year contract with the Turkish club Sivasspor.

On 29 August 2018, he dissolved his Sivasspor contract.

On 28 February 2019, he signed with Belarusian club Dinamo Minsk until the end of the 2019 season.

== Honours ==
=== Club ===
Rostov

- Russian Cup: 2013–14

=== Individual ===
- List of 33 top players of the Russian league: #3 (2013–14).

== Career statistics ==
Club	Season	League			Cup		Continental		Other		Total	
Club	Season	Division	Apps	Goals	Apps	Goals	Apps	Goals	Apps	Goals	Apps	Goals
Sochi-04 (loan)	2007	Russian Second League	22	3	2	0	–		–		24	3
Gubkin (loan)	2008	Russian Second League	21	2	2	1	–		–		23	3
Lokomotiv Moscow	2009	Russian Premier League	0	0	0	0	–		–		0	0
Lokomotiv Moscow	2010	Russian Premier League	0	0	0	0	–		–		0	0
Lokomotiv Moscow	2011–12	Russian Premier League	0	0	0	0	0	0	–		0	0
Lokomotiv Moscow	Total		0	0	0	0	0	0	0	0	0	0
Lokomotiv-2 Moscow	2010	Russian Second League	24	4	1	0	–		–		25	4
Rostov	2011–12	Russian Premier League	4	0	0	0	–		2 (Note: Appearances in the relegation play-offs)	0	6	0
Rostov	2012–13	Russian Premier League	25	2	3	0	–		1	0	29	2
Rostov	2013–14	Russian Premier League	29	4	3	0	–		–		32	4
Rostov	2014–15	Russian Premier League	29	4	1	0	2 (Note: Appearances in the UEFA Europa League)	0	3 (Note: One appearance in the Russian Super Cup, two appearances, three goals in the relegation play-offs)	3	35	7
Rostov	Total		87	10	7	0	2	0	6	3	102	13
Dynamo Moscow	2015–16	Russian Premier League	20	3	3	0	–		–		23	3
Dynamo Moscow	2016–17	Russian First League	0	0	–		–		–		0	0
Dynamo Moscow	Total		20	3	3	0	0	0	0	0	23	3
Tom Tomsk (loan)	2016–17	Russian Premier League	14	1	0	0	–		–		14	1
Sivasspor	2017–18	Süper Lig	11	1	3	1	–		–		14	2
Sivasspor	2018–19	Süper Lig	0	0	–		–		–		0	0
Sivasspor	Total		11	1	3	1	0	0	0	0	14	2
Dinamo Minsk	2019	Belarusian Premier League	10	1	4	0	–		–		14	1
Spartak-2 Moscow	2019–20	Russian First League	2	1	–		–		–		2	1
Spartak-2 Moscow	2020–21	Russian First League	28	3	–		–		–		28	3
Spartak-2 Moscow	Total		30	4	0	0	0	0	0	0	30	4
Career total			239	29	22	2	2	0	6	3	269	34
