= Ruslan Abazov =

Russian professional football player

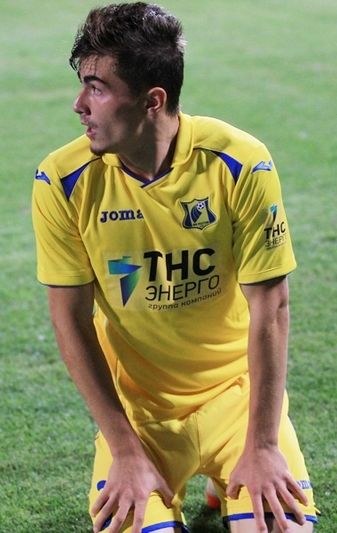
- Abazov in 2014

Personal information
- Full name: Ruslan Aslanovich Abazov
- Date of birth: 25 May 1993 (age 33)
- Place of birth: Nartkala, Russia
- Height: 1.80 m (5 ft 11 in)
- Position: Defender

Youth career
- 2010–2012: PFC Spartak Nalchik

Senior career*
Years	Team	Apps	(Gls)
2012–2014	PFC Spartak Nalchik	41	(0)
2014–2016	FC Rostov	3	(0)
2015	→ FC Tyumen (loan)	12	(1)
2015	→ FC Fakel Voronezh (loan)	5	(0)
2015–2016	→ FC Tyumen (loan)	21	(0)
2016–2018	FC Tosno	27	(0)
2018	→ FC Rotor Volgograd (loan)	11	(0)
2018–2019	FC Nizhny Novgorod	21	(1)

International career
2011	Russia U-18	1	(0)
- * Club domestic league appearances and goals

Ruslan Aslanovich Abazov (Russian: Руслан Асланович Абазов; born 25 May 1993) is a Russian former professional football player. He played as a right back.

== Career ==
=== Spartak Nalchik ===
He made his Russian Premier League debut for PFC Spartak Nalchik on 27 April 2012 in a game against FC Krylia Sovetov Samara.

=== Rostov ===
In June 2014, FC Rostov announced sighing Abazov on a four-year deal.

== Honours ==
=== Club ===
Tosno

- Russian Cup: 2017–18
