= 2011–12 FC Amkar Perm season =

Amkar Perm
2011–12 season
- Chairman: Gennady Shilov
- Manager: Rashid Rakhimov (until 28 September 2011); Miodrag Božović (from 29 September 2011)
- Stadium: Zvezda Stadium
- Russian Premier League: 10th
- Russian Cup: Round of 16 vs Krasnodar
- Russian Cup: Round of 16 vs Rubin Kazan
- Top goalscorer: League: Two Players (5); All: Two Players (5)
Home colours	Away colours

The 2011–12 Amkar Perm season was their 8th season in the Russian Premier League, the highest tier of association football in Russia, following promotion during the 2003 season.

== Squad ==
Note: Flags indicate national team as defined under FIFA eligibility rules; some limited exceptions apply. Players may hold more than one non-FIFA nationality.

No.	Pos.	Nation	Player
1	GK	RUS	Roman Gerus
3	DF	SRB	Nikola Mijailović
5	MF	RUS	Vitali Grishin
6	MF	SRB	Marko Blažić
7	MF	BUL	Georgi Peev
8	FW	RUS	Sergei Volkov
11	FW	MNE	Radomir Đalović
13	MF	MNE	Mitar Novaković
14	DF	BUL	Zahari Sirakov
15	MF	SRB	Predrag Mijić
17	MF	EST	Konstantin Vassiljev
18	FW	RUS	Nikita Burmistrov
19	MF	RUS	Aleksandr Kolomeytsev
20	DF	RUS	Artyom Molodtsov

No.	Pos.	Nation	Player
21	DF	RUS	Dmitri Belorukov (Captain)
23	DF	RUS	Ivan Cherenchikov
24	DF	KAZ	Aleksei Popov
25	DF	UKR	Serhiy Harashchenkov
26	FW	SVK	Martin Jakubko
42	GK	RUS	Sergei Narubin
43	FW	RUS	Yevgeni Tyukalov
46	FW	RUS	Aleksandr Subbotin
50	DF	RUS	Mikhail Smirnov
66	MF	RUS	Artur Ryabokobylenko
73	DF	RUS	Brian Idowu
77	DF	GEO	Zourab Tsiskaridze
83	DF	RUS	Georgi Dzhioyev

=== Out on loan ===
Note: Flags indicate national team as defined under FIFA eligibility rules; some limited exceptions apply. Players may hold more than one non-FIFA nationality.

No. / Pos. / Nation / Player; 22 / MF / RUS / Andrei Sekretov (at Gazovik Orenburg)	No. / Pos. / Nation / Player; 33 / MF / CRO / Josip Knežević (at Kairat)

== Transfers ==
=== Winter 2010-11 ===
In: Note: Flags indicate national team as defined under FIFA eligibility rules; some limited exceptions apply. Players may hold more than one non-FIFA nationality.

No.	Pos.	Nation	Player
3	DF	SRB	Nikola Mijailović (from (Poland) Korona Kielce)
11	FW	MNE	Radomir Đalović (from (Croatia) Rijeka)
15	FW	SRB	Predrag Mijić (from (Serbia) Partizan)
16	DF	BIH	Samir Merzić (from (Slovakia) Senica)
20	MF	RUS	Artyom Molodtsov (from (Russia) Saturn Moscow Oblast)
44	DF	RUS	Nikita Permyakov
49	FW	RUS	Timofei Sirotin
51	GK	RUS	Igor Stepanov (from (Russia) Lokomotiv-2 Moscow)
63	FW	RUS	Damir Sadikov (end of loan to (Russia) Tyumen)
84	MF	RUS	Danil Kochkin (from (Russia) Sibir Novosibirsk)
88	GK	BLR	Vasil Khamutowski (from (Ukraine) Tavriya Simferopol)

Out: Note: Flags indicate national team as defined under FIFA eligibility rules; some limited exceptions apply. Players may hold more than one non-FIFA nationality.

No.	Pos.	Nation	Player
1	GK	RUS	Igor Usminskiy (to (Russia) Krasnodar)
2	DF	RUS	Sergei Morozov (to (Russia) Neftekhimik Nizhnekamsk)
9	FW	JPN	Seiichiro Maki (to (China) Shenzhen Ruby)
11	MF	RUS	Aleksei Pomerko (on loan to (Russia) Lokomotiv-2 Moscow)
15	DF	HUN	Miklós Gaál (to (Russia) Volga Nizhny Novgorod)
29	FW	BUL	Martin Kushev (to (Bulgaria) Slavia Sofia)
34	DF	RUS	Yevgeni Sitnikov (to (Russia) Oktan Perm)
35	MF	RUS	Artur Gadzaov (released)
41	GK	RUS	Maksim Shumailov (on loan to (Russia) Oktan Perm, previously on loan to (Russia) Tyumen)
44	GK	RUS	Sergei Sinelnikov (to (Russia) Energiya Volzhsky)
70	MF	RUS	Nika Piliyev (end of loan from (Russia) CSKA Moscow)
71	MF	RUS	Gor Oganesyan (released)
77	MF	RUS	Dmitri Sokolov (to (Russia) Sokol Saratov)
83	MF	SLO	Luka Žinko (end of loan from (Cyprus) APOP Kinyras Peyias)
88	MF	RUS	Vladislav Zakoptelov (to (Russia) Oktan Perm)
90	MF	RUS	Maksim Magurov (released)
—	DF	RUS	Mikhail Makagonov (on loan to (Russia) Oktan Perm, previously on loan to (Russia) Dynamo St. Petersburg)
—	FW	BRA	Jean Carlos (to (Brazil) Chapecoense, previously on loan to (Brazil) Ceará)
—	FW	CRO	Edin Junuzović (to (Russia) Dynamo Bryansk, previously on loan)

=== Summer 2011 ===
In: Note: Flags indicate national team as defined under FIFA eligibility rules; some limited exceptions apply. Players may hold more than one non-FIFA nationality.

No.	Pos.	Nation	Player
6	MF	SRB	Marko Blažić (from (Slovakia) Ružomberok)
17	MF	EST	Konstantin Vassiljev (from (Slovenia) Luka Koper)
25	DF	UKR	Serhiy Garashchenkov (from (Ukraine) Shakhtar Donetsk)
29	DF	MNE	Nemanja Mijušković (on loan from (Russia) Dynamo Moscow)
35	GK	RUS	Andrei Danilov
40	MF	RUS	Igor Paderin (from (Russia) Kuban Krasnodar)
48	MF	RUS	Nikita Glukhikh
60	MF	RUS	Artur Valikayev (on loan from (Russia) Spartak Moscow)
61	GK	RUS	Mikhail Oparin
70	MF	RUS	Dmitri Kozlov
77	DF	GEO	Zourab Tsiskaridze (from (Canada) Montreal Impact)
83	DF	RUS	Georgi Dzhioyev (from (Russia) Zhemchuzhina-Sochi)

Out: Note: Flags indicate national team as defined under FIFA eligibility rules; some limited exceptions apply. Players may hold more than one non-FIFA nationality.

No.	Pos.	Nation	Player
9	FW	MKD	Stevica Ristić (to (South Korea) Suwon Bluewings)
16	DF	BIH	Samir Merzić (to (Bosnia and Herzegovina) Velež Mostar)
28	DF	RUS	Vyacheslav Kalashnikov (to (Russia) Dynamo Bryansk)
55	GK	RUS	Dmitri Yershov (to (Russia) Istra)
58	FW	RUS	Ilya Kolpakov (released)

=== Winter 2011–12 ===
In: Note: Flags indicate national team as defined under FIFA eligibility rules; some limited exceptions apply. Players may hold more than one non-FIFA nationality.

No.	Pos.	Nation	Player
1	GK	RUS	Roman Gerus (from (Russia) Dynamo Bryansk)
26	FW	SVK	Martin Jakubko (from (Slovakia) Dukla Banská Bystrica)

Out: Note: Flags indicate national team as defined under FIFA eligibility rules; some limited exceptions apply. Players may hold more than one non-FIFA nationality.

No.	Pos.	Nation	Player
4	DF	UKR	Vitaliy Fedoriv (to (Ukraine) Kryvbas Kryvyi Rih)
22	MF	RUS	Andrei Sekretov (on loan to (Russia) Gazovik Orenburg)
33	MF	CRO	Josip Knežević (on loan to (Kazakhstan) Kairat)
37	DF	RUS	Kirill Moryganov (to (Russia) Oktan Perm)
39	FW	UKR	Ilya Mikhalyov (to (Ukraine) Karpaty Lviv)
45	MF	RUS	Aleksei Skvortsov
48	MF	RUS	Nikita Glukhikh (released)
60	MF	RUS	Artur Valikayev (to (Russia) Shinnik Yaroslavl)
78	MF	RUS	Vladimir Shpyryov (released)
88	GK	BLR	Vasil Khamutowski (released)
91	DF	RUS	Artyom Moryganov (to (Russia) Oktan Perm)
98	DF	RUS	Andrey Blyndu (to (Spain) Castellón)

== Competitions ==
=== Russian Premier League ===
==== Matches ====
13 March 2011 1	CSKA Moscow	2 – 0	Amkar Perm	Khimki
19:15 YET (UTC+6)	Nababkin (yellow card) 23'; Ignashevich 45' (pen.), 48'; Šemberas (yellow card) 75'	Summary	Sirakov (yellow card) 10'; Belorukov (yellow card) 44'; Ristić (yellow card) 46'; Popov (yellow card) 49'	Stadium: Arena Khimki; Attendance: 7,848; Referee: Vyacheslav Popov

20 March 2011 2	Amkar Perm	1 – 0	Lokomotiv Moscow	Perm
17:15 YET (UTC+6)	Ristić 25'; Volkov (yellow card) 33'; Belorukov (yellow card) 76'; Narubin (yellow card) 89'; Molodtsov (yellow card) 90+3'	Summary		Stadium: Zvezda Stadium; Attendance: 9,000; Referee: Vitaly Meshkov

2 April 2011 3	Amkar Perm	1 – 1	Krylia Sovetov	Perm
18:00 YET (UTC+6)	Sirakov 24'; Kolomeytsev (yellow card) 37'	Summary	Sosnin (yellow card) 35'; Pryyomov (yellow card) 47'; Đorđević (yellow card) 61'; Kuznetsov 69'; Taranov (yellow card) 80'	Stadium: Zvezda Stadium; Attendance: 8,200; Referee: Vladislav Bezborodov

9 April 2011 4	Krasnodar	1 – 0	Amkar Perm	Krasnodar
18:15 YET (UTC+6)	Tubić 68'	Summary	Cherenchikov (yellow card) 69'; Belorukov (yellow card) 78'	Stadium: Kuban Stadium; Attendance: 3,500; Referee: Almir Kayumov

17 April 2011 5	Amkar Perm	1 – 3	Zenit St.Petersburg	Perm
14:15 YET (UTC+6)	Sirakov (yellow card) 4'; Novaković (yellow card) 19'; Cherenchikov (yellow card) 36'; Mikhalyov 90'	Summary	Ionov 20'; Danny 24'; Luković (yellow card) 38'; Bukharov 80'	Stadium: Zvezda Stadium; Attendance: 12,700; Referee: Alexey Nikolaev

24 April 2011 6	Rubin Kazan	1 – 1	Amkar Perm	Kazan
18:30 YET (UTC+6)	Ryazantsev 42'; Kuzmin (yellow card) 86'	Summary	Cherenchikov (yellow card) 13'; Peev (yellow card) 31'; Sekretov (yellow card) 45+1'; Sharonov 56' (o.g.); Volkov (yellow card) 84'; Khamutowski (yellow card) 90+2'	Stadium: Central Stadium; Attendance: 14,250; Referee: Maxim Layushkin

1 May 2011 7	Amkar Perm	1 – 2	Tom Tomsk	Perm
14:00 YET (UTC+6)	Kalashnikov (yellow card) 7'; Ristić 14'; Fedoriv (yellow card) 23'; Mijailović (yellow card) 86'; Volkov (yellow card) 90+3'	Summary	Golyshev 40', 48'; Gultyayev (yellow card) 78'; Sabitov (yellow card) 86'	Stadium: Zvezda Stadium; Attendance: 8,200; Referee: Vladimir Kazmenko

8 May 2011 8	Spartak Moscow	1 – 2	Amkar Perm	Moscow
18:15 YET (UTC+6)	Carioca (yellow card) 9'; McGeady 75'	Summary	Sekretov (yellow card) 8'; Mijailović (yellow card) 21'; Mikhalyov 82'; Novaković (yellow card) 84'; Burmistrov 90'	Stadium: Luzhniki Stadium; Attendance: 9,263; Referee: Aleksandr Egorov

15 May 2011 9	Amkar Perm	0 – 0	Dynamo Moscow	Perm
15:30 YET (UTC+6)	Cherenchikov (yellow card) 90+2'	Summary	Fernández (yellow card) 44'	Stadium: Zvezda Stadium; Attendance: 9,500; Referee: Vitali Meshkov

21 May 2011 10	Rostov	3 – 0	Amkar Perm	Rostov-on-Don
16:00 YET (UTC+6)	Okoronkwo (yellow card) 35'; Grigoryev (yellow card) 45+3'; Adamov 50'; Gațcan 82'; Blatnjak 87'	Summary	Sekretov (yellow card) 10'; Mijailović (yellow card) 49'; Novaković (yellow card) 71'	Stadium: Olimp-2; Attendance: 6,500; Referee: Maxim Layushkin

30 May 2011 11	Amkar Perm	1 – 0	Volga Nizhny Novgorod	Perm
19:30 YET (UTC+6)	Peev 51'; Volkov (yellow card) 78'	Summary		Stadium: Zvezda Stadium; Attendance: 8,850; Referee: Almir Kayumov

10 June 2011 12	Kuban Krasnodar	3 – 2	Amkar Perm	Krasnodar
20:45 YET (UTC+6)	Traoré 43', 66' (yellow card) 60'; Maksimov (yellow card) 57'; Varga (yellow card) 70'; Bucur 88'	Summary	Belorukov 29'; Burmistrov 51'; Popov (yellow card) 66'	Stadium: Kuban Stadium; Attendance: 12,800; Referee: Sergey Lapochkin

14 June 2011 13	Amkar Perm	1 – 0	Terek Grozny	Perm
19:45 YET (UTC+6)	Amelyanchuk 90' (o.g.)	Summary	Maurício (yellow card) 33'; Tiuí (yellow card) 70'; Asildarov (yellow card) 82'; Utsiyev (yellow card) 87'	Stadium: Zvezda Stadium; Attendance: 7,400; Referee: Aleksey Eskov

18 June 2011 14	Amkar Perm	0 – 0	Anzhi Makhachkala	Perm
18:30 YET (UTC+6)	Fedoriv (yellow card) 32'; Burmistrov (yellow card) 90+3'	Summary		Stadium: Zvezda Stadium; Attendance: 8,800; Referee: Sergey Karasev

22 June 2011 15	Amkar Perm	1 – 0	Spartak Nalchik	Perm
19:45 YET (UTC+6)	Volkov (yellow card) 44'; Sirakov (yellow card) 49' (yellow-red card) 61'; Grishin 58'; Mijailović (yellow card) 80'	Summary	Lebedev (yellow card) 68'; Milić (yellow card) 88'; Lukanchenkov (yellow card) 90+5'	Stadium: Zvezda Stadium; Attendance: 7,600; Referee: Maxim Layushkin

26 June 2011 16	Amkar Perm	0 – 2	CSKA Moscow	Perm
18:30 YET (UTC+6)	Belorukov (yellow card) 66'; Peev (yellow card) 90+2'	Summary	Doumbia 8', 84'	Stadium: Zvezda Stadium; Attendance: 14,300; Referee: Mikhail Vilkov

24 July 2011 17	Lokomotiv Moscow	4 – 0	Amkar Perm	Moscow
20:45 YET (UTC+6)	Loskov 32'; Glushakov 40'; Sychev 48'; Ozdoyev (yellow card) 76'; Minchenkov 79'	Summary	Fedoriv (yellow card) 61'; Mikhalyov (yellow card) 85'; Sekretov (yellow card) 88'	Stadium: Lokomotiv Stadium; Attendance: 11,055; Referee: Stanislav Sukhina

1 August 2011 18	Krylia Sovetov	1 – 1	Amkar Perm	Samara
21:00 YET (UTC+6)	Koroman 10'; Vorobyov (yellow card) 67'	Summary	Mijailović (yellow card) 26'; Mikhalyov 82' (yellow card) 82'	Stadium: Metallurg Stadium; Attendance: 16,800; Referee: Timur Arslanbekov

7 August 2011 19	Amkar Perm	0 – 2	Krasnodar	Perm
17:30 YET (UTC+6)	Popov (yellow card) 65'	Summary	Abreu 13'; Markov (yellow card) 31'; Amisulashvili (yellow card) 45'; Drinčić 48'; Joãozinho (yellow card) 71'; Vranješ (yellow card) 89'	Stadium: Zvezda Stadium; Attendance: 7,000; Referee: Vladimir Kazmenko

14 August 2011 20	Zenit St.Petersburg	1 – 1	Amkar Perm	Saint Petersburg
19:45 YET (UTC+6)	Kerzhakov (yellow card) 16' (goal) 52'; Shirokov (yellow card) 61'; Bukharov (yellow card) 90+1'; Criscito (yellow card) 90+4'	Summary	Kolomeytsev 23'; Volkov (yellow card) 34'; Popov (yellow card) 45'; Mijailović (yellow card) 70'; Narubin (yellow card) 90'; Cherenchikov (yellow card) 90+3'	Stadium: Petrovsky Stadium; Attendance: 21,000; Referee: Vyacheslav Kharlamov

20 August 2011 21	Amkar Perm	1 – 1	Rubin Kazan	Perm
18:00 YET (UTC+6)	Sekretov 36'; Mikhalyov (yellow card) 45'; Sirakov (yellow card) 48'; Novaković (yellow card) 52'	Summary	Kuzmin (yellow card) 6'; Bocchetti (yellow card) 45'; Kvirkvelia 84'	Stadium: Zvezda Stadium; Attendance: 7,500; Referee: Mikhail Vilkov

27 August 2011 22	Tom Tomsk	0 – 0	Amkar Perm	Tomsk
17:30 YET (UTC+6)	Boyarintsev (yellow card) 52'; Balyaikin (yellow card) 64'	Summary	Mijailović (yellow card) 39'; Kolomeytsev (yellow card) 43'; Peev (yellow card) 55'	Stadium: Trud Stadium; Attendance: 8,200; Referee: Aleksey Eskov

11 September 2011 23	Amkar Perm	0 – 1	Spartak Moscow	Perm
15:45 YET (UTC+6)	Blažić (yellow card) 16'	Summary	Pareja 85'; Rodri (yellow card) 90'; Kombarov (yellow card) 90+4'	Stadium: Zvezda Stadium; Attendance: 13,250; Referee: Stanislav Sukhina

18 September 2011 24	Dynamo Moscow	3 – 0	Amkar Perm	Khimki
18:15 YET (UTC+6)	Voronin 10'; Yusupov (yellow card) 36'; Kurányi (yellow card) 49'; Semshov 60'; Nyakhaychyk 86'	Summary	Cherenchikov (yellow card) 8'	Stadium: Arena Khimki; Attendance: 7,796; Referee: Vladimir Kazmenko

25 September 2011 25	Amkar Perm	0 – 1	Rostov	Perm
18:15 YET (UTC+6)	Mijailović (yellow card) 45'	Summary	Yemelyanov (yellow card) 45+2' (yellow-red card) 49'; Adamov 50'	Stadium: Zvezda Stadium; Attendance: 6,200; Referee: Almir Kayumov

1 October 2011 26	Volga Nizhny Novgorod	0 – 0	Amkar Perm	Nizhny Novgorod
18:15 YET (UTC+6)	Bondar (yellow card) 20' (yellow-red card) 90+3'; Belozyorov (yellow card) 38'; Pashtov (yellow card) 53'; Malyarov (yellow card) 72'; Crosas (yellow card) 83'	Summary	Knežević (yellow card) 14'; Blažić (yellow card) 15'; Peev (yellow card) 75' (red card) 75'	Stadium: Lokomotiv Stadium; Attendance: 4,500; Referee: Aleksey Eskov

16 October 2011 27	Amkar Perm	3 – 1	Kuban Krasnodar	Perm
14:30 YET (UTC+6)	Mijailović 3' (yellow card) 39'; Knežević (yellow card) 5' (yellow-red card) 84' (goal) 58'; Novaković (yellow card) 56'; Burmistrov 75'	Summary	Né (yellow card) 56'; Bucur (yellow card) 74' (goal) 90+4'	Stadium: Zvezda Stadium; Attendance: 7,200; Referee: Alexey Nikolaev

22 October 2011 28	Terek Grozny	1 – 0	Amkar Perm	Grozny
18:15 YET (UTC+6)	Gvazava (yellow card) 41'; Asildarov (yellow card) 52'; Ferreira 70'	Summary	Cherenchikov (yellow card) 25'; Blažić (yellow card) 25'; Smirnov (yellow card) 42'	Stadium: Akhmat-Arena; Attendance: 10,300; Referee: Eduard Malyi

29 October 2011 29	Anzhi Makhachkala	2 – 1	Amkar Perm	Makhachkala
17:00 YET (UTC+6)	Boussoufa (yellow card) 34'; Zhirkov 43'; Gadzhibekov (yellow card) 48'; Eto'o (yellow card) 58' (goal) 81'; Angbwa (yellow card) 68'	Summary	Mijailović (yellow card) 20'; Blažić (yellow card) 48'; Volkov (yellow card) 60'; Mikhalyov 90+1'	Stadium: Dynamo Stadium; Attendance: 14,100; Referee: Sergey Lapochkin

6 November 2011 30	Spartak Nalchik	2 – 1	Amkar Perm	Nalchik
16:00 YET (UTC+6)	Golić (yellow card) 13'; Kontsedalov 45'; Sirakov 49' (o.g.); Goshokov (yellow card) 50'; Lebedev (yellow card) 63'; Rukhaia (yellow card) 64'	Summary	Mijić (yellow card) 25'; Mijailović (yellow card) 39'; Cherenchikov (yellow card) 78'; Đalović (yellow card) 83'; Tyukalov 90'	Stadium: Spartak Stadium; Attendance: 3,000; Referee: Vitaly Meshkov

==== League table ====
Pos	Team	Pld	W	D	L	GF	GA	GD	Pts	Qualification
11	Terek Grozny	30	8	7	15	29	45	−16	31	Qualification to Relegation group
12	Volga Nizhny Novgorod	30	8	4	18	24	40	−16	28	Qualification to Relegation group
13	Amkar Perm	30	6	9	15	20	39	−19	27 (Note: Amkar Perm ahead of Krylia Sovetov on head-to-head points; Amkar Perm–Krylia Sovetov 1–1, Krylia Sovetov–Amkar Perm 1–1.)	Qualification to Relegation group
14	Krylia Sovetov Samara	30	6	9	15	21	43	−22	27	Qualification to Relegation group
15	Spartak Nalchik	30	5	9	16	23	40	−17	24	Qualification to Relegation group

Source: Russian Premier League
Rules for classification: 1) points; 2) number of wins; 3) head-to-head points; 4) number of head-to-head wins; 5) head-to-head goal difference; 6) number of head-to-head goals scored; 7) number of head-to-head away goals scored; 8) goal difference; 9) number of goals scored; 10) number of away goals scored.

=== Russian Premier League — Relegation Group ===
==== Matches ====
19 November 2011 31	Volga Nizhny Novgorod	1 – 2	Amkar Perm	Nizhny Novgorod
16:00 YET (UTC+6)	Belozyorov 7' (yellow card) 86'; Grigalava (yellow card) 38' (yellow-red card) 52'; Yeshchenko (yellow card) 42'; Malyarov (yellow card) 43'; Buivolov (red card) 86'; Shulenin (yellow card) 89'; Ajinjal (yellow card) 90+5'	Summary	Belorukov (yellow card) 27'; Grishin 60' (yellow card) 70'; Burmistrov 61' (yellow card) 84'	Stadium: Lokomotiv Stadium; Attendance: 3,800; Referee: Vladimir Kazmenko

27 November 2011 32	Rostov	1 – 1	Amkar Perm	Rostov-on-Don
16:15 YET (UTC+6)	Smolnikov (yellow card) 7'; Cociș 33'; Filatov (yellow card) 64'	Summary	Cherenchikov (yellow card) 21'; Kolomeytsev 57'; Novaković (yellow card) 66'	Stadium: Olimp-2; Attendance: 4,000; Referee: Timur Arslanbekov

6 March 2012 33	Amkar Perm	2 – 1	Krylia Sovetov	Perm
19:00 YET (UTC+6)	Peev 6'; Belorukov 58'; Kolomeytsev (yellow card) 89'	Summary	Joseph-Reinette (yellow card) 23'; Yakovlev (yellow card) 39'; Petrov 70' (yellow card) 80'	Stadium: Zvezda Stadium; Attendance: 6,100; Referee: Sergey Karasev

12 March 2012 34	Spartak Nalchik	1 – 2	Amkar Perm	Nalchik
18:30 YET (UTC+6)	Džudović (yellow card) 32'; Golić 81'	Summary	Grishin 22'; Smirnov (yellow card) 43'; Burmistrov 68'; Sirakov (yellow card) 75'; Narubin (yellow card) 84'; Blažić (yellow card) 90+3'	Stadium: Spartak Stadium; Attendance: 7,000; Referee: Sergey Kuznetsov

18 March 2012 35	Amkar Perm	0 – 0	Tom Tomsk	Perm
14:00 YET (UTC+6)	Volkov (yellow card) 22'; Jakubko (yellow card) 69'	Summary	Boyarintsev (yellow card) 28'	Stadium: Zvezda Stadium; Attendance: 7,800; Referee: Aleksandr Egorov

24 March 2012 36	Krasnodar	0 – 1	Amkar Perm	Krasnodar
20:30 YET (UTC+6)	Amisulashvili (yellow card) 83'	Summary	Jakubko 4'; Sirakov (yellow card) 42'; Belorukov (yellow card) 53'	Stadium: Kuban Stadium; Attendance: 2,000; Referee: Sergey Ivanov

1 April 2012 37	Amkar Perm	2 – 0	Terek Grozny	Perm
16:00 YET (UTC+6)	Mijailović (yellow card) 49' (goal) 54'; Belorukov (yellow card) 56'; Jiránek 86' (o.g.)	Summary	Pavlenko (yellow card) 90+4'	Stadium: Zvezda Stadium; Attendance: 7,400; Referee: Evgeny Turbin

7 April 2012 38	Amkar Perm	1 – 0	Rostov	Perm
16:00 YET (UTC+6)	Sirakov (yellow card) 1' (yellow-red card) 59'; Belorukov (yellow card) 47'; Gațcan 69' (o.g.); Peev (yellow card) 90+2'	Summary	Élson (yellow card) 28'; Cociș (yellow card) 42'; Gațcan (yellow card) 49'; Yemelyanov (yellow card) 50'; Kolodin (yellow card) 69'	Stadium: Zvezda Stadium; Attendance: 9,100; Referee: Almir Kayumov

14 April 2012 39	Krylia Sovetov	2 – 1	Amkar Perm	Samara
20:30 YET (UTC+6)	Kornilenko 61' (pen.), 63'; Tshibamba (yellow card) 85'; Petrov (yellow card) 90+2'	Summary	Novaković (yellow card) 35' (yellow-red card) 75'; Volkov (yellow card) 40' (yellow-red card) 63'; Peev 41'; Kolomeytsev (yellow card) 58'; Harashchenkov (yellow card) 60'; Ryabokobylenko (yellow card) 81'	Stadium: Metallurg Stadium; Attendance: 13,400; Referee: Igor Fedotov

21 April 2012 40	Amkar Perm	1 – 0	Spartak Nalchik	Perm
14:00 YET (UTC+6)	Grishin 34'; Burmistrov (yellow card) 35'; Sirakov (yellow card) 67'; Mijailović (yellow card) 77'; Narubin (yellow card) 90+7'	Summary	Kontsedalov (yellow card) 33'	Stadium: Zvezda Stadium; Attendance: 8,300; Referee: Igor Egorov

27 April 2012 41	Tom Tomsk	0 – 0	Amkar Perm	Tomsk
17:00 YET (UTC+6)	Rebko (yellow card) 28'; Nakhushev (yellow card) 49'	Summary	Mijailović (yellow card) 72'; Sirakov (yellow card) 82'	Stadium: Trud Stadium; Attendance: 6,000; Referee: Stanislav Sukhina

2 May 2012 42	Amkar Perm	2 – 2	Krasnodar	Perm
19:00 YET (UTC+6)	Mijailović (yellow card) 32'; Belorukov (yellow card) 37'; Grishin 39'; Sirakov 90+4'	Summary	Movsisyan 14'; Joãozinho 83'	Stadium: Zvezda Stadium; Attendance: 7,700; Referee: Mikhail Vilkov

6 May 2012 43	Terek Grozny	3 – 1	Amkar Perm	Grozny
20:30 YET (UTC+6)	Sadayev 7', 85' (yellow card) 71'; Rybus 22'; Polczak (yellow card) 64'	Summary	Blažić 9'; Belorukov (yellow card) 53'	Stadium: Akhmat-Arena; Attendance: 19,200; Referee: Sergey Lapochkin

13 May 2012 44	Amkar Perm	4 – 1	Volga Nizhny Novgorod	Perm
19:30 YET (UTC+6)	Narubin (red card) 11'; Volkov 32'; Novaković 38'; Peev 69' (pen.) (yellow card) 69'; Subbotin 81'	Summary	Bibilov 13' (pen.); Pomerko (yellow card) 43' (yellow-red card) 68'; Pleșan (yellow card) 53'; Grigalava (yellow card) 68'	Stadium: Zvezda Stadium; Attendance: 16,100; Referee: Aleksandr Egorov

==== League table ====
Pos	Team	Pld	W	D	L	GF	GA	GD	Pts	Qualification or relegation
9	Krasnodar	44	16	13	15	58	61	−3	61	
10	Amkar Perm	44	14	13	17	40	51	−11	55	
11	Terek Grozny	44	14	10	20	45	62	−17	52	
12	Krylia Sovetov Samara	44	12	15	17	33	50	−17	51	
13	Rostov (O)	44	12	12	20	45	61	−16	48	Qualification to Relegation play-offs
14	Volga Nizhny Novgorod (O)	44	12	5	27	37	60	−23	41	Qualification to Relegation play-offs
15	Tom Tomsk (R)	44	8	13	23	30	70	−40	37	Relegation to Football National League
16	Spartak Nalchik (R)	44	7	13	24	39	60	−21	34	Relegation to Football National League

Source: Russian Premier League
Rules for classification: 1) points; 2) number of wins; 3) head-to-head points; 4) number of head-to-head wins; 5) head-to-head goal difference; 6) number of head-to-head goals scored; 7) number of head-to-head away goals scored; 8) goal difference; 9) number of goals scored; 10) number of away goals scored
(O) Play-off winners; (R) Relegated

=== Russian Cup ===
==== 2010-11 ====
6 March 2011 Round of 16	Amkar Perm	0 – 1 (a.e.t.)	Krasnodar	Perm
19:00 YET (UTC+6)	Cherenchikov (yellow card) 50'; Ristić (yellow card) 93'; Sirakov (yellow card) 106'; Volkov (yellow card) 110'	Summary	Amisulashvili (yellow card) 4'; Kulchy (yellow card) 80'; Picușceac (yellow card) 95' (goal) 98'; Drinčić (yellow card) 113'	Stadium: Zvezda Stadium; Attendance: 8,000; Referee: Yuri Baskakov

==== 2011-12 ====
17 July 2011 Round of 32	Metallurg-Kuzbass Novokuznetsk	0 – 1	Amkar Perm	Novokuznetsk
17:00 YET (UTC+6)	Samoylov (yellow card) 81'; Avsyuk (yellow card) 82'	Summary	Kolomeytsev 32'	Stadium: Metallurg Stadium; Attendance: 8,000; Referee: Igor Nizovtsev

21 September 2011 Round of 16	Amkar Perm	0 – 2	Rubin Kazan	Perm
17:00 YET (UTC+6)	Blažić (yellow card) 33'; Mijailović (yellow card) 45'	Summary	Lebedenko 10'; Kasaev 25'; Kislyak (yellow card) 32'; Bystrov (yellow card) 90'	Stadium: Zvezda Stadium; Attendance: 6,400; Referee: Igor Fedotov

== Squad statistics ==
As of match played 21 September 2011

=== Appearances and goals ===
No.	Pos	Nat	Player	Total		Premier League		Russian Cup	
No.	Pos	Nat	Player	Apps	Goals	Apps	Goals	Apps	Goals
1	GK	(Russia) RUS	Roman Gerus	3	0	2+1	0	0	0
3	DF	(Serbia) SRB	Nikola Mijailović	35	2	32+1	2	2	0
5	MF	(Russia) RUS	Vitali Grishin	39	5	29+8	5	1+1	0
6	MF	(Serbia) SRB	Marko Blažić	22	1	11+10	1	1	0
7	MF	(Bulgaria) BUL	Georgi Peev	40	4	37+1	4	2	0
8	FW	(Russia) RUS	Sergei Volkov	30	1	19+9	1	1+1	0
10	MF	(Russia) RUS	Andrei Topchu	1	0	0+1	0	0	0
11	FW	(Montenegro) MNE	Radomir Đalović	28	0	15+12	0	1	0
13	MF	(Montenegro) MNE	Mitar Novaković	44	1	32+10	1	2	0
14	DF	(Bulgaria) BUL	Zahari Sirakov	42	2	39	2	3	0
15	FW	(Serbia) SRB	Predrag Mijić	12	0	8+2	0	2	0
17	MF	(Estonia) EST	Konstantin Vassiljev	17	0	14+3	0	0	0
18	FW	(Russia) RUS	Nikita Burmistrov	32	5	17+12	5	1+2	0
19	MF	(Russia) RUS	Aleksandr Kolomeytsev	45	1	42	0	3	1
20	MF	(Russia) RUS	Artyom Molodtsov	5	0	0+5	0	0	0
21	DF	(Russia) RUS	Dmitri Belorukov	30	2	28	2	2	0
23	DF	(Russia) RUS	Ivan Cherenchikov	32	0	28+1	0	3	0
24	DF	(Kazakhstan) KAZ	Aleksei Popov	20	0	19	0	1	0
25	DF	(Ukraine) UKR	Serhiy Harashchenkov	6	0	3+3	0	0	0
26	FW	(Slovakia) SVK	Martin Jakubko	10	1	10	1	0	0
42	GK	(Russia) RUS	Sergei Narubin	31	0	29	0	2	0
43	FW	(Russia) RUS	Yevgeni Tyukalov	15	1	2+13	1	0	0
46	FW	(Russia) RUS	Aleksandr Subbotin	3	1	1+2	1	0	0
50	DF	(Russia) RUS	Mikhail Smirnov	5	0	4+1	0	0	0
66	MF	(Russia) RUS	Artur Ryabokobylenko	2	0	1+1	0	0	0
73	DF	(Russia) RUS	Brian Idowu	1	0	1	0	0	0
77	DF	(Georgia (country)) GEO	Zurab Tsiskaridze	3	0	2+1	0	0	0
83	DF	(Russia) RUS	Georgi Dzhioyev	1	0	0+1	0	0	0
Players who left Amkar Perm on loan:
22	MF	(Russia) RUS	Andrei Sekretov	15	1	11+2	1	1+1	0
33	MF	(Croatia) CRO	Josip Knežević	7	1	5+2	1	0	0
Players who left Amkar Perm during the season:
4	DF	(Ukraine) UKR	Vitaliy Fedoriv	11	0	9+1	0	1	0
9	FW	(North Macedonia) MKD	Stevica Ristić	14	2	9+4	2	1	0
28	DF	(Russia) RUS	Vyacheslav Kalashnikov	2	0	1+1	0	0	0
39	FW	(Ukraine) UKR	Ilya Mikhalyov	28	4	10+16	4	1+1	0
60	MF	(Russia) RUS	Artur Valikayev	3	0	1+1	0	1	0
88	GK	(Belarus) BLR	Vasil Khamutowski	15	0	13+1	0	1	0

=== Goal Scorers ===
Place	Position	Nation	Number	Name	Premier League	Russian Cup	Total
1	FW	(Russia)	18	Nikita Burmistrov	5	0	5
1	DF	(Russia)	5	Vitali Grishin	5	0	5
3	FW	(Ukraine)	39	Ilya Mikhalyov	4	0	4
3	MF	(Bulgaria)	7	Georgi Peev	4	0	4
3				Own goal	4	0	4
6	MF	(Russia)	19	Aleksandr Kolomeytsev	2	1	3
7	FW	(North Macedonia)	9	Stevica Ristić	2	0	2
7	DF	(Bulgaria)	14	Zahari Sirakov	2	0	2
7	DF	(Russia)	21	Dmitri Belorukov	2	0	2
7	DF	(Serbia)	3	Nikola Mijailović	2	0	2
11	MF	(Russia)	22	Andrei Sekretov	1	0	1
11	MF	(Croatia)	33	Josip Knežević	1	0	1
11	FW	(Russia)	43	Yevgeni Tyukalov	1	0	1
11	FW	(Slovakia)	26	Martin Jakubko	1	0	1
11	MF	(Serbia)	6	Marko Blažić	1	0	1
11	FW	(Russia)	8	Sergei Volkov	1	0	1
11	MF	(Montenegro)	13	Mitar Novaković	1	0	1
11	FW	(Russia)	46	Aleksandr Subbotin	1	0	1
				TOTALS	40	1	41

=== Disciplinary record ===
Number	Nation	Position	Name	Russian Premier League		Russian Cup		Total	
Number	Nation	Position	Name	Yellow card	Red card	Yellow card	Red card	Yellow card	Red card
3	(Serbia)	DF	Nikola Mijailović	15	0	1	0	1	0
4	(Ukraine)	DF	Vitaliy Fedoriv	3	0	0	0	1	0
5	(Russia)	MF	Vitali Grishin	1	0	0	0	1	0
6	(Serbia)	MF	Marko Blažić	4	0	1	0	1	0
7	(Bulgaria)	MF	Georgi Peev	6	1	0	0	1	0
8	(Russia)	FW	Sergei Volkov	10	1	1	0	1	0
9	(North Macedonia)	FW	Stevica Ristić	1	0	1	0	1	0
11	(Montenegro)	FW	Radomir Đalović	1	0	0	0	1	0
13	(Montenegro)	MF	Mitar Novaković	8	1	0	0	1	0
14	(Bulgaria)	DF	Zahari Sirakov	11	2	1	0	1	0
15	(Serbia)	FW	Predrag Mijić	1	0	0	0	1	0
18	(Russia)	FW	Nikita Burmistrov	3	0	0	0	1	0
19	(Russia)	MF	Aleksandr Kolomeytsev	4	0	0	0	1	0
20	(Russia)	DF	Artyom Molodtsov	1	0	0	0	1	0
21	(Russia)	DF	Dmitri Belorukov	10	0	0	0	1	0
22	(Russia)	MF	Andrei Sekretov	4	0	0	0	1	0
22	(Russia)	DF	Vyacheslav Kalashnikov	1	0	0	0	1	0
23	(Russia)	DF	Ivan Cherenchikov	9	0	1	0	1	0
24	(Kazakhstan)	DF	Aleksei Popov	4	0	0	0	1	0
25	(Ukraine)	DF	Serhiy Harashchenkov	1	0	0	0	1	0
26	(Slovakia)	FW	Martin Jakubko	1	0	0	0	1	0
33	(Croatia)	MF	Josip Knežević	3	1	0	0	1	0
39	(Ukraine)	FW	Ilya Mikhalyov	3	0	0	0	1	0
42	(Russia)	GK	Sergei Narubin	4	1	0	0	1	0
50	(Russia)	DF	Mikhail Smirnov	2	0	0	0	1	0
66	(Russia)	MF	Artur Ryabokobylenko	1	0	0	0	1	0
88	(Belarus)	GK	Vasil Khamutowski	1	0	0	0	1	0
			TOTALS	113	7	6	0	119	7
