= 2012–13 FC Amkar Perm season =

Amkar Perm
2012–13 season
- Chairman: Gennady Shilov
- Manager: Nikolai Trubachov until 16 January 2013; Rustem Khuzin from 17 January 2013
- Stadium: Zvezda Stadium
- Russian Premier League: 11th
- Russian Cup: Round of 32 vs SKA-Energiya Khabarovsk
- Top goalscorer: League: Georgi Peev & Nikita Burmistrov (5); All: Georgi Peev & Nikita Burmistrov (5)
Home colours	Away colours

The 2012–13 Amkar Perm season was their 9th season in the Russian Premier League, the highest tier of association football in Russia, following promotion during the 2003 season. They finished in 11th place in the league and were knocked out of the Russian Cup at the Round of 32 stage by SKA-Energiya Khabarovsk.

== Squad ==
Note: Flags indicate national team as defined under FIFA eligibility rules; some limited exceptions apply. Players may hold more than one non-FIFA nationality.

No.	Pos.	Nation	Player
1	GK	RUS	Roman Gerus
2	FW	GRE	Nikolaos Karelis
3	DF	SRB	Nikola Mijailović
5	MF	RUS	Vitali Grishin
7	MF	BUL	Georgi Peev
8	FW	RUS	Sergei Volkov
9	MF	BUL	Blagoy Georgiev
10	MF	RUS	Aleksei Rebko
13	MF	MNE	Mitar Novaković
14	DF	BUL	Zahari Sirakov
15	FW	LAT	Vladimirs Kamešs
17	MF	EST	Konstantin Vassiljev
18	FW	RUS	Nikita Burmistrov (on loan from Anzhi Makhachkala)
19	MF	RUS	Aleksandr Kolomeytsev
21	DF	RUS	Dmitri Belorukov (Captain)

No.	Pos.	Nation	Player
22	DF	RUS	Andrei Semyonov
23	DF	RUS	Ivan Cherenchikov
24	DF	KAZ	Aleksei Popov
26	FW	SVK	Martin Jakubko
27	MF	RUS	Vadim Gagloyev
30	FW	EGY	Marwan Mohsen
32	MF	NED	Gianluca Nijholt
33	DF	RUS	Naim Sharifi
42	GK	RUS	Sergei Narubin
43	FW	RUS	Yevgeni Tyukalov
50	DF	RUS	Mikhail Smirnov
66	MF	RUS	Artur Ryabokobylenko
83	FW	MDA	Igor Picuşceac
85	MF	SVK	Michal Breznaník
99	FW	RUS	Maksim Kanunnikov

== Transfers ==
=== Summer ===
In: Note: Flags indicate national team as defined under FIFA eligibility rules; some limited exceptions apply. Players may hold more than one non-FIFA nationality.

No.	Pos.	Nation	Player
2	FW	GRE	Nikolaos Karelis (from (Greece) Ergotelis)
9	MF	RUS	Aleksei Rebko (from (Russia) Tom Tomsk)
11	FW	RUS	Pavel Ignatovich (from (Russia) Dynamo Bryansk)
27	MF	RUS	Vadim Gagloyev (from (Russia) Nizhny Novgorod)
32	MF	NED	Gianluca Nijholt (from (Netherlands) Utrecht)
63	FW	RUS	Stanislav Matyash (from (Russia) Zenit Saint Petersburg, previously on loan to (Russia) Volgar Astrakhan)
83	FW	MDA	Igor Picuşceac (from (Russia) Krasnodar)
—	MF	RUS	Mikhail Belov (from (Russia) Lokomotiv Liski)
—	MF	RUS	Andrei Sekretov (end of loan to (Russia) Gazovik Orenburg)

Out: Note: Flags indicate national team as defined under FIFA eligibility rules; some limited exceptions apply. Players may hold more than one non-FIFA nationality.

No.	Pos.	Nation	Player
10	MF	RUS	Andrei Topchu (released)
11	FW	MNE	Radomir Đalović (to (Iran) Sepahan Isfahan)
18	MF	RUS	Nikita Burmistrov (to (Russia) Anzhi Makhachkala)
20	DF	RUS	Artyom Molodtsov (to (Russia) Torpedo Moscow)
51	GK	RUS	Igor Stepanov (to (Russia) Ufa)
77	DF	GEO	Zourab Tsiskaridze (to (Sweden) J-Södra)
83	DF	RUS	Georgi Dzhioyev (released)

=== Winter ===
In: Note: Flags indicate national team as defined under FIFA eligibility rules; some limited exceptions apply. Players may hold more than one non-FIFA nationality.

No.	Pos.	Nation	Player
9	MF	BUL	Blagoy Georgiev (from (Russia) Terek Grozny)
15	FW	LAT	Vladimirs Kamešs (from (Latvia) Liepājas Metalurgs)
18	FW	RUS	Nikita Burmistrov (loan from (Russia) Anzhi Makhachkala)
33	MF	CRO	Josip Knežević (end on loan to (Kazakhstan) FC Kairat)
99	FW	RUS	Maksim Kanunnikov (from (Russia) Zenit Saint Petersburg)

Out: Note: Flags indicate national team as defined under FIFA eligibility rules; some limited exceptions apply. Players may hold more than one non-FIFA nationality.

No.	Pos.	Nation	Player
4	DF	UKR	Serhiy Garashchenkov (to (Ukraine) Karpaty Lviv)
6	MF	SRB	Marko Blažić (to (Uzbekistan) FC Bunyodkor)
11	FW	RUS	Pavel Ignatovich (to (Russia) Dynamo Moscow)
33	MF	CRO	Josip Knežević (to (Kazakhstan) FC Kairat)
63	FW	RUS	Stanislav Matyash (on loan to (Bulgaria) Chernomorets Burgas)

== Competitions ==
=== Russian Premier League ===
==== Matches ====
22 July 2012 1	Zenit St. Petersburg	2 – 0	Amkar Perm	Saint Petersburg
15:00 MSK (UTC+4)	Kerzhakov 37', 62' (pen.)	Summary		Stadium: Petrovsky Stadium; Attendance: 20,057; Referee: Aleksey Eskov

28 July 2012 2	Amkar	3 – 1	CSKA Moscow	Perm
17:30 MSK (UTC+4)	Burmistrov 7'; Rebko 19', 41'	Summary	Honda 13'; Ignashevich (red card) 61'; Dzagoev (red card) 85'	Stadium: Zvezda Stadium; Attendance: 12,500; Referee: Eduard Malyi

4 August 2012 3	Anzhi Makhachkala	1 – 0	Amkar Perm	Makhachkala
19:00 MSK (UTC+4)	Gabulov 72'	Summary		Stadium: Dynamo Stadium; Attendance: 14,000; Referee: Badavi Guseynov

12 August 2012 4	Amkar Perm	0 – 0	Mordovia Saransk	Perm
15:00 MSK (UTC+4)		Summary		Stadium: Zvezda Stadium; Attendance: 8,300; Referee: Vasiliy Kazartsev

20 August 2012 5	Krylia Sovetov Samara	0 – 2	Amkar Perm	Samara
18:00 MSK (UTC+4)	Caballero (red card) 39'	Summary	Burmistrov 2'; Vassiljev 45+1'	Stadium: Metallurg Stadion; Attendance: 11,400; Referee: Sergey Ivanov

26 August 2012 6	Amkar Perm	2 – 2	Krasnodar	Perm
14:00 MSK (UTC+4)	Burmistrov 27'; Ryabokobylenko 37'	Summary	Movsisyan 20', 25'	Stadium: Zvezda Stadium; Attendance: 8,100; Referee: Aleksey Eskov

1 September 2012 7	Alania Vladikavkaz	1 – 1	Amkar Perm	Vladikavkaz
20:00MSK (UTC+4)	Priskin 70'	Summary	Ignatovich 35'	Stadium: Republican Spartak Stadium; Attendance: 10,000; Referee: Timur Arslanbekov

17 September 2012 8	Amkar Perm	3 – 2	Volga Nizhny Novgorod	Perm
17:30 MSK (UTC+4)	Peev 45' (pen.), 77' (pen.); Picușceac 89'	Summary	Sapogov 47'; Grigalava 66'	Stadium: Zvezda Stadium; Attendance: 5,800; Referee: Evgeny Turbin

22 September 2012 9	Dynamo Moscow	3 – 2	Amkar Perm	Moscow
15:45 MSK (UTC+4)	Jantscher 30'; Kurányi 78'; Kokorin 83'	Summary	Jakubko 25'; Cherenchikov (red card) 37'; Breznaník 90+2'	Stadium: Arena Khimki; Attendance: 4,134; Referee: Aleksey Nikolaev

29 September 2012 10	Amkar Perm	1 – 3	Spartak Moscow	Perm
16:30 MSK (UTC+4)	Ignatovich 22'; Narubin (red card) 49'	Summary	Källström 33'; Ari 67'; Dzyuba 90+6'	Stadium: Zvezda Stadium; Attendance: 16,500; Referee: Aleksandr Egorov

6 October 2012 11	Rubin Kazan	0 – 1	Amkar Perm	Kazan
15:45 MSK (UTC+4)		Summary	Ignatovich 3'; Sirakov (yellow card) 89' (yellow-red card) 90+2'	Stadium: Tsentralnyi Stadion; Attendance: 6,450; Referee: Vladislav Bezborodov

21 October 2012 12	Amkar Perm	0 – 1	Terek Grozny	Perm
13:00 MSK (UTC+4)		Summary	Lebedenko 66'	Stadium: Zvezda Stadium; Attendance: 6,600; Referee: Sergey Ivanov

26 October 2012 13	Lokomotiv Moscow	1 – 2	Amkar Perm	Moscow
18:30 MSK (UTC+4)	Pavlyuchenko 37'	Summary	Peev 25'; Picuşceac 90+4'	Stadium: Lokomotiv Stadium; Attendance: 10,110; Referee: Aleksandr Egorov

3 November 2012 14	Amkar Perm	0 – 3	Kuban Krasnodar	Perm
13:00 MSK (UTC+4)	Volkov (red card) 90+3'	Summary	Baldé 59'; Özbiliz 72' (pen.); Pizzelli 87'	Stadium: Zvezda Stadium; Attendance: 5,800; Referee: Vasiliy Kazartsev

9 November 2012 15	Rostov	3 – 0	Amkar Perm	Rostov
19:00 MSK (UTC+4)	Cociș 27'; Saláta 69'; Kirichenko 74' (pen.)	Summary		Stadium: Olimp - 2 Attendance: 6,000; Referee: Vladislav Bezborodov

18 November 2012 16	CSKA Moscow	3 – 0	Amkar Perm	Moscow
13:30 MSK (UTC+4)	Elm 25' (pen.); Musa 73'; Cauņa 90+2'	Summary		Stadium: Luzhniki Stadium; Attendance: 6,524; Referee: Maxim Layushkin

26 November 2012 17	Amkar Perm	1 – 2	Anzhi Makhachkala	Perm
15:30 MSK (UTC+4)	Semyonov 26'	Summary	Ahmedov 28'; Shatov 90+2'	Stadium: Zvezda Stadium; Attendance: 6,300; Referee: Alesey Eskov

3 December 2012 18	Mordovia Saransk	1 – 1	Amkar Perm	Saransk
18:00 MSK (UTC+4)	Panchenko 85'	Summary	Picusceac 9'	Stadium: Start Stadium; Attendance: 2,500; Referee: Igor Nizovtsev

8 December 2012 19	Amkar Perm	0 – 2	Krylia Sovetov Samara	Samara
12:00 MSK (UTC+4)	Semyonov (yellow card) 26' (yellow-red card) 40'	Summary	Cherenchikov 5' (o.g.); Yeliseyev 38'	Stadium: Metallurg Stadion; Attendance: 5,500; Referee: Sergey Kostevich

8 March 2013 20	Krasnodar	2 – 1	Amkar Perm	Krasnodar
13:30 MSK (UTC+4)	Abreu 28'; Wánderson 57'	Summary	Burmistrov 25'	Stadium: Kuban Stadium; Attendance: 8,000; Referee: Vitali Meshkov

16 March 2013 21	Amkar Perm	5 – 1	Alania Vladikavkaz	Perm
16:00 MSK (UTC+4)	Kolomeytsev 10'; Jakubko 16', 29'; Vassiljev 90+2' (pen.); Kanunnikov 90+3'	Summary	Vranješ 63'	Stadium: Zvezda Stadium; Attendance: 6,250; Referee: Maxim Layushkin

31 March 2013 22	Volga Nizhny Novgorod	1 – 1	Amkar Perm	Nizhny Novgorod
13:30 MSK (UTC+4)	Aleksei Sapogov 69' (pen.)	Summary	Peev 60' (pen.)	Stadium: Lokomotiv Stadium; Attendance: 7,200; Referee: Sergey Lapochkin

5 April 2013 23	Amkar Perm	1 – 1	Dynamo Moscow	Perm
17:00 MSK (UTC+4)	Peev 29' (pen.)	Summary	Noboa 72' (fk)	Stadium: Zvezda Stadium; Attendance: 9,150; Referee: Vladislav Bezborodov

13 April 2013 24	Spartak Moscow	2 – 0	Amkar Perm	Moscow
MSK (UTC+4)	Yakovlev 20'; Movsisyan 68'	Summary		Stadium: Luzhniki Stadium; Attendance: 12,876; Referee: Sergey Ivanov

19 April 2013 25	Amkar Perm	1 – 1	Rubin Kazan	Perm
17:00 MSK (UTC+4)	Kanunnikov 84'	Summary	Rondón 26'	Stadium: Zvezda Stadium; Attendance: 11,500; Referee: Alexey Nikolaev

27 April 2013 26	Terek Grozny	2 – 1	Amkar Perm	Grozny
16:00 MSK (UTC+4)	Rybus 32', 65'	Summary	Burmistrov 85'	Stadium: Sultan Bilimkhanov Stadium; Attendance: 17,000; Referee: Igor Nizovtsev

5 May 2013 27	Amkar Perm	2 – 4	Lokomotiv Moscow	Perm
16:00 MSK (UTC+4)	Georgiev 24'; Sirakov 90+2'	Summary	Miranchuk 45'; N'Doye 53' (pen.); Torbinski 64'; Yanbayev 68'	Stadium: Zvezda Stadium; Attendance: 11,800; Referee: Aleksandr Egorov

11 May 2013 28	Kuban Krasnodar	4 – 0	Amkar Perm	Krasnodar
19:30 MSK (UTC+4)	Baldé 8', 42'; Popov 44'; Pizzelli 76' (pen.)	Summary		Stadium: Kuban Stadium; Attendance: 16,724; Referee: Vladislav Bezborodov

17 May 2013 29	Amkar Perm	3 – 2	Rostov	Perm
17:00 MSK (UTC+4)	Kolomeytsev 17'; Jakubko 23'; Georgiev 55' (pen.)	Summary	Starikov 64', 90+3'	Stadium: Zvezda Stadium; Attendance: 16,100; Referee: Alexey Nikolaev

26 May 2013 30	Amkar Perm	0 – 0	Zenit St. Petersburg	Perm
13:30 MSK (UTC+4)		Summary		Stadium: Zvezda Stadium; Attendance: 14,150; Referee: Timur Arslanbekov

==== Table ====
Pos	Team	Pld	W	D	L	GF	GA	GD	Pts	Qualification or relegation
9	Lokomotiv Moscow	30	12	7	11	39	36	+3	43	
10	Krasnodar	30	12	6	12	45	39	+6	42	
11	Amkar Perm	30	7	8	15	34	51	−17	29 (Note: Amkar Perm ahead of Volga Nizhny Novgorod and Rostov on head-to-head points; Amkar Perm: 7 pts, Volga Nizhny Novgorod: 5 pts, Rostov: 4 pts.)	
12	Volga Nizhny Novgorod	30	7	8	15	28	46	−18	29	
13	Rostov (O)	30	7	8	15	30	41	−11	29	Qualification for the Relegation play-offs

Source: Russian Premier League
Rules for classification: 1) points; 2) number of wins; 3) head-to-head points; 4) number of head-to-head wins; 5) head-to-head goal difference; 6) number of head-to-head goals scored; 7) number of head-to-head away goals scored; 8) goal difference; 9) number of goals scored; 10) number of away goals scored; 11) position in the 2011–12 season (only used until all the regularly scheduled games have been played); 11) extra play-off game or tournament between the teams in question.
(O) Play-off winners

=== Russian Cup ===
25 September 2012 Round of 32	SKA-Energiya Khabarovsk	2 – 1 (a.e.t.)	Amkar Perm	Khabarovsk
12:00 MSK (UTC+4)	Arzumanyan 16'; Lutsenko 102'	Summary	Ryabokobylenko 82'	Stadium: Lenin Stadium; Attendance: 7,000; Referee: Lasha Verulidze

== Squad statistics ==
=== Appearances and goals ===
No.	Pos	Nat	Player	Total		Premier League		Russian Cup	
No.	Pos	Nat	Player	Apps	Goals	Apps	Goals	Apps	Goals
1	GK	(Russia) RUS	Roman Gerus	12	0	9+2	0	1+0	0
2	FW	(Greece) GRE	Nikolaos Karelis	10	0	1+8	0	0+1	0
3	DF	(Serbia) SRB	Nikola Mijailović	20	0	20+0	0	0+0	0
5	MF	(Russia) RUS	Vitali Grishin	7	0	3+4	0	0+0	0
7	DF	(Bulgaria) BUL	Georgi Peev	24	5	23+1	5	0+0	0
8	FW	(Russia) RUS	Sergei Volkov	9	0	3+6	0	0+0	0
9	MF	(Bulgaria) BUL	Blagoy Georgiev	10	2	10+0	2	0+0	0
10	MF	(Russia) RUS	Aleksei Rebko	3	2	2+1	2	0+0	0
13	MF	(Montenegro) MNE	Mitar Novaković	12	0	9+3	0	0+0	0
14	DF	(Bulgaria) BUL	Zahari Sirakov	28	1	28+0	1	0+0	0
15	FW	(Latvia) LAT	Vladimirs Kamešs	10	0	3+7	0	0+0	0
17	MF	(Estonia) EST	Konstantin Vassiljev	27	2	23+4	2	0+0	0
18	FW	(Russia) RUS	Nikita Burmistrov	7	5	7+0	5	0+0	0
19	MF	(Russia) RUS	Aleksandr Kolomeytsev	26	2	25+0	2	1+0	0
21	DF	(Russia) RUS	Dmitri Belorukov	15	0	15+0	0	0+0	0
22	DF	(Russia) RUS	Andrei Semyonov	10	1	9+0	1	1+0	0
23	DF	(Russia) RUS	Ivan Cherenchikov	26	0	24+2	0	0+0	0
24	DF	(Kazakhstan) KAZ	Aleksei Popov	9	0	8+1	0	0+0	0
26	FW	(Slovakia) SVK	Martin Jakubko	21	4	17+4	4	0+0	0
27	MF	(Russia) RUS	Vadim Gagloyev	10	0	8+2	0	0+0	0
32	MF	(Netherlands) NED	Gianluca Nijholt	10	0	6+4	0	0+0	0
33	DF	(Russia) RUS	Naim Sharifi	3	0	1+1	0	1+0	0
42	GK	(Russia) RUS	Sergei Narubin	21	0	21+0	0	0+0	0
43	FW	(Russia) RUS	Yevgeni Tyukalov	4	0	0+3	0	0+1	0
50	DF	(Russia) RUS	Mikhail Smirnov	5	0	4+0	0	1+0	0
66	MF	(Russia) RUS	Artur Ryabokobylenko	11	2	7+3	1	1+0	1
73	DF	(Russia) RUS	Bryne dovu	1	0	0+0	0	1+0	0
83	FW	(Moldova) MDA	Igor Picuşceac	23	3	6+16	3	1+0	0
85	MF	(Slovakia) SVK	Michal Breznaník	8	1	5+2	1	1+0	0
99	FW	(Russia) RUS	Maksim Kanunnikov	11	2	10+1	2	0+0	0
Players who left Amkar Perm on loan:
63	FW	(Russia) RUS	Stanislav Matyash	4	0	1+2	0	1+0	0
Players who left Amkar Perm during the season:
4	DF	(Ukraine) UKR	Serhiy Garashchenkov	3	0	1+2	0	0+0	0
6	MF	(Serbia) SRB	Marko Blažić	6	0	2+3	0	1+0	0
11	FW	(Russia) RUS	Pavel Ignatovich	15	3	12+2	3	0+1	0

=== Top scorers ===
Place	Position	Nation	Number	Name	Premier League	Russian Cup	Total
1	FW	(Russia)	18	Nikita Burmistrov	5	0	5
1	MF	(Bulgaria)	7	Georgi Peev	5	0	5
3	FW	(Slovakia)	26	Martin Jakubko	4	0	4
4	FW	(Russia)		Pavel Ignatovich	3	0	3
4	FW	(Moldova)	83	Igor Picusceac	3	0	3
6	MF	(Russia)	10	Aleksei Rebko	2	0	2
6	MF	(Estonia)	17	Konstantin Vassiljev	2	0	2
6	MF	(Russia)	19	Aleksandr Kolomeytsev	2	0	2
6	MF	(Bulgaria)	9	Blagoy Georgiev	2	0	2
6	FW	(Russia)	99	Maksim Kanunnikov	2	0	2
6	MF	(Russia)	66	Artur Ryabokobylenko	1	1	2
12	MF	(Slovakia)	85	Michal Breznaník	1	0	1
12	DF	(Russia)	22	Andrei Semyonov	1	0	1
12	DF	(Bulgaria)	14	Zahari Sirakov	1	0	1
				TOTALS	34	1	35

=== Disciplinary record ===
Number	Nation	Position	Name	Russian Premier League		Russian Cup		Total	
Number	Nation	Position	Name	Yellow card	Red card	Yellow card	Red card	Yellow card	Red card
1	(Russia)	GK	Roman Gerus	1	0	1	0	2	0
3	(Serbia)	DF	Nikola Mijailović	7	0	0	0	7	0
7	(Bulgaria)	MF	Georgi Peev	3	1	0	0	3	1
8	(Russia)	FW	Sergei Volkov	0	1	0	0	0	1
9	(Bulgaria)	MF	Blagoy Georgiev	1	0	0	0	1	0
11	(Russia)	FW	Pavel Ignatovich	4	0	0	0	4	0
13	(Montenegro)	MF	Mitar Novaković	2	0	0	0	2	0
14	(Bulgaria)	DF	Zahari Sirakov	2	1	0	0	2	1
17	(Estonia)	MF	Konstantin Vassiljev	1	0	0	0	1	0
18	(Russia)	FW	Nikita Burmistrov	1	0	0	0	1	0
21	(Russia)	MF	Dmitri Belorukov	5	0	0	0	5	0
22	(Russia)	DF	Andrei Semyonov	4	1	1	0	5	1
23	(Russia)	DF	Ivan Cherenchikov	7	1	0	0	7	1
24	(Kazakhstan)	DF	Aleksei Popov	3	0	0	0	3	0
26	(Slovakia)	FW	Martin Jakubko	6	0	0	0	6	0
27	(Russia)	MF	Vadim Gagloyev	2	0	0	0	2	0
32	(Netherlands)	MF	Gianluca Nijholt	4	0	0	0	4	0
33	(Russia)	DF	Naim Sharifi	1	0	0	0	1	0
42	(Russia)	GK	Sergei Narubin	3	1	0	0	3	1
50	(Russia)	DF	Mikhail Smirnov	2	0	0	0	2	0
85	(Slovakia)	MF	Michal Breznaník	1	0	1	0	2	0
99	(Russia)	FW	Maksim Kanunnikov	2	0	0	0	2	0
			TOTALS	62	5	3	0	65	5
