= Tyukalov =

Tyukalov (Russian: Тюкалов) is a Russian masculine surname, its feminine counterpart is Tyukalova. Notable people with the surname include:

- Yevgeni Tyukalov (born 1992), Russian football player
- Yuriy Tyukalov (1930–2018), Russian rower
