= Vladislav Zakoptelov =

Russian footballer

Personal information
- Full name: Vladislav Mikhailovich Zakoptelov
- Date of birth: 26 June 1988 (age 38)
- Place of birth: Perm, Russian SFSR
- Height: 1.84 m (6 ft 1/2 in)
- Position: Striker

Youth career
- Football SDYuSShOR Perm

Senior career*
Years	Team	Apps	(Gls)
2004–2010	FC Amkar Perm	0	(0)
2011–2012	FC Oktan Perm	33	(4)
- * Club domestic league appearances and goals

Vladislav Mikhailovich Zakoptelov (Russian: Владислав Михайлович Закоптелов; born 26 June 1988) is a former Russian football striker.

== Club career ==
He made his debut for the senior squad of FC Amkar Perm on 20 September 2006 in the Russian Cup game against FC Angusht Nazran.
