= Vadim Gagloev =

Russian footballer

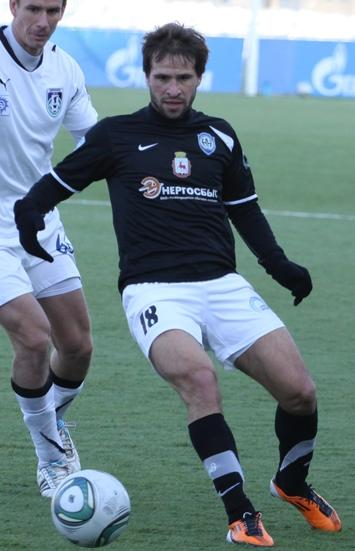
- Gagloev with Nizhny Novgorod

Personal information
- Full name: Vadim Gamletovich Gagloev
- Date of birth: 18 January 1989 (age 37)
- Place of birth: Tskhinvali, Georgian SSR, Soviet Union
- Height: 1.74 m (5 ft 8 1/2 in)
- Position: Midfielder

Youth career
- 2001–2007: CSKA Moscow

Senior career*
Years	Team	Apps	(Gls)
2006–2007	CSKA Moscow	0	(0)
2008	Alania Vladikavkaz	22	(0)
2009–2010	Amkar Perm	4	(0)
2010	Tyumen	9	(0)
2011–2012	Nizhny Novgorod	40	(1)
2012–2013	Amkar Perm	10	(0)
2013–2014	Mordovia Saransk	14	(0)
2014–2015	Yenisey Krasnoyarsk	14	(0)

International career
2005–2006	Russia U17	10	(0)
- * Club domestic league appearances and goals

Vadim Gamletovich Gagloev (Russian: Вадим Гамлетович Гаглоев; born 18 January 1989) is a former Russian professional footballer.

== Career ==
Gagloev made his professional debut for CSKA Moscow on 20 September 2006 in the Russian Cup game against Mordovia.

== International career ==
Gagloev was the captain of the Russian U-17 squad that won the 2006 UEFA U-17 Championship.
