= Vyacheslav Kalashnikov =

Russian footballer

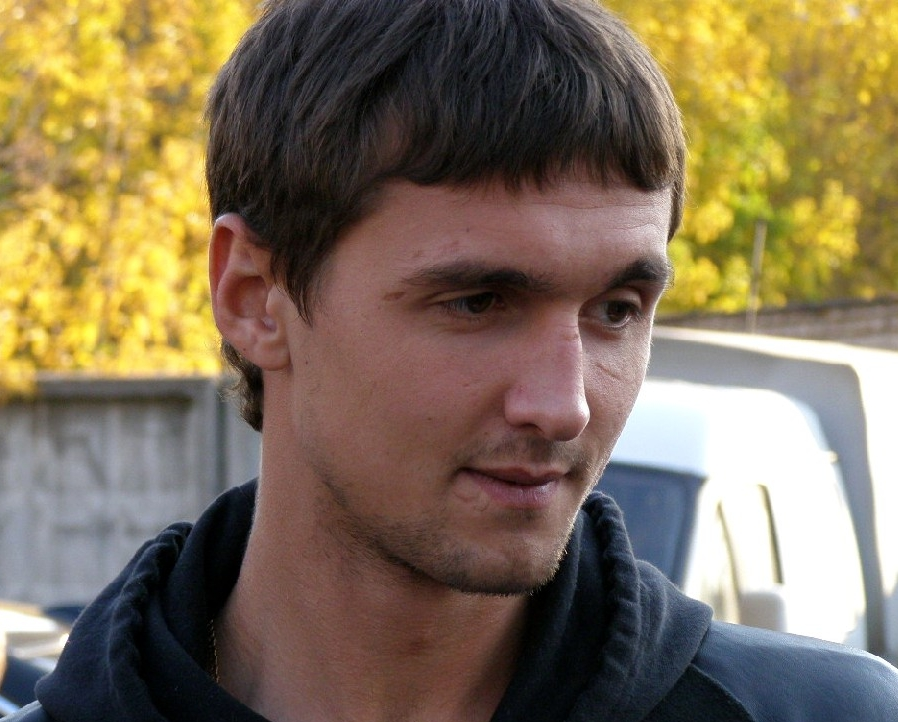

Personal information
- Full name: Vyacheslav Andreyevich Kalashnikov
- Date of birth: May 12, 1985 (age 41)
- Place of birth: Svetlograd, Russian SFSR
- Height: 1.92 m (6 ft 4 in)
- Position: Defender

Senior career*
Years	Team	Apps	(Gls)
2002–2005	FC Rotor Volgograd	28	(6)
2006	FC Saturn Ramenskoye	0	(0)
2007–2008	FC SKA Rostov-on-Don	28	(2)
2008–2011	FC Amkar Perm	29	(0)
2011–2012	FC Dynamo Bryansk	14	(1)
2012	FC Slavyansky Slavyansk-na-Kubani	9	(0)
2013	FC Zenit Penza	5	(0)
2013–2014	FC Khimki	3	(1)
2014–2015	FC Vityaz Krymsk	2	(0)
- * Club domestic league appearances and goals

Vyacheslav Andreyevich Kalashnikov (Russian: Вячеслав Андреевич Калашников; born 12 May 1985) is a Russian former footballer.
