= Aleksandr Subbotin =

Russian footballer

Personal information
- Full name: Aleksandr Alekseyevich Subbotin
- Date of birth: 20 October 1991 (age 35)
- Place of birth: Perm, Russian SFSR
- Height: 1.79 m (5 ft 10 in)
- Position: Forward

Youth career
- FC Amkar Perm

Senior career*
| Years | Team | Apps | (Gls) |
| 2008–2014 | FC Amkar Perm | 4 | (1) |
| 2012–2013 | → FC Zenit Penza (loan) | 18 | (4) |
| 2013 | → FC Tambov (loan) | 5 | (1) |
| 2015 | FC Baltika Kaliningrad | 6 | (0) |
| 2015–2016 | FC Neftekhimik Nizhnekamsk | 21 | (2) |
| 2016 | FC Dynamo Saint Petersburg | 7 | (0) |
| 2017–2018 | FC KAMAZ Naberezhnye Chelny | 16 | (2) |
| 2018–2019 | FC Zvezda Perm | 25 | (13) |
| 2019–2020 | FC Tyumen | 11 | (4) |
| 2020–2022 | FC Zvezda Perm | 34 | (9) |

International career
| 2011 | Russia U-20 | 4 | (2) |
- * Club domestic league appearances and goals

Aleksandr Alekseyevich Subbotin (Russian: Александр Алексеевич Субботин; born 20 October 1991) is a Russian former professional football player.

== Club career ==
He made his Russian Premier League debut for FC Amkar Perm on 1 April 2012 in a game against FC Terek Grozny.

== Honours ==
=== Individual ===
- Russian Professional Football League Zone Ural-Privolzhye top scorer (12 goals) (2018–19).
