= Mikhail Smirnov (footballer, born 1990) =

Russian footballer

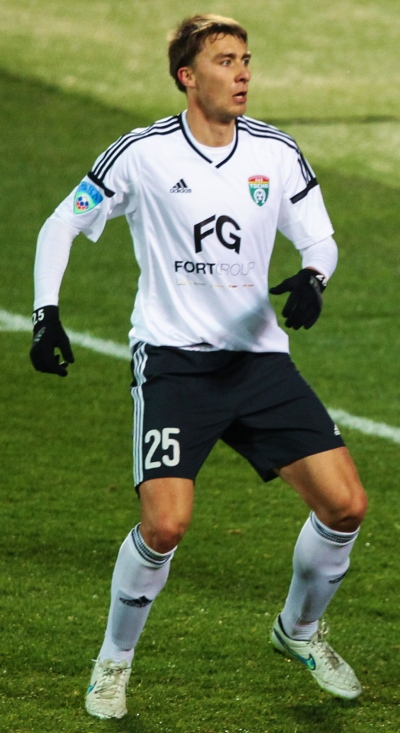
- Smirnov with Tosno in 2015

Personal information
- Full name: Mikhail Olegovich Smirnov
- Date of birth: 3 June 1990 (age 36)
- Place of birth: St. Petersburg, Russian SFSR
- Height: 1.89 m (6 ft 2 1/2 in)
- Position: Centre-back

Team information
- Current team: FC Fakel Voronezh (assistant coach)

Youth career
- FC Smena St. Petersburg
- 2006–2008: FC Zenit St. Petersburg
- 2009: FC Krasnodar-D
- 2010–2014: FC Amkar Perm

Senior career*
Years	Team	Apps	(Gls)
2011–2014	FC Amkar Perm	9	(0)
2013	→ FC Neftekhimik Nizhnekamsk (loan)	14	(0)
2014–2016	FC Tosno	52	(1)
2016–2018	FC Kuban Krasnodar	34	(0)
2018–2019	FC Sibir Novosibirsk	32	(0)
2019–2023	FC Fakel Voronezh	40	(1)

Managerial career
- 2023–2024: FC Fakel Voronezh (administrator)
- 2024–: FC Fakel Voronezh (assistant)
- * Club domestic league appearances and goals

Mikhail Olegovich Smirnov (Russian: Михаил Олегович Смирнов; born 3 June 1990) is a Russian professional football coach and a former player. He is an assistant manager of FC Fakel Voronezh.

== Club career ==
He made his Russian Premier League debut on 20 August 2011 for FC Amkar Perm in a game against FC Rubin Kazan.

Smirnov retired from playing in June 2023 and took a position on FC Fakel Voronezh coaching staff.

== Career statistics ==
As of 27 November 2022

Club	Season	League			Cup		Continental		Other		Total	
Club	Season	Division	Apps	Goals	Apps	Goals	Apps	Goals	Apps	Goals	Apps	Goals
Amkar Perm	2011–12	RPL	5	0	0	0	–		–		5	0
Amkar Perm	2012–13	RPL	4	0	1	0	–		–		5	0
Amkar Perm	2013–14	RPL	0	0	–		–		–		0	0
Amkar Perm	Total		9	0	1	0	0	0	0	0	10	0
Neftekhimik (loan)	2013–14	First League	14	0	1	0	–		–		15	0
Tosno	2014–15	First League	24	1	1	0	–		5 (Note: Two appearances in the promotion play-offs, three appearances in the FNL Cup)	0	30	1
Tosno	2015–16	First League	28	0	3	0	–		–		31	0
Tosno	Total		52	1	4	0	0	0	5	0	61	1
Kuban Krasnodar	2016–17	First League	16	0	0	0	–		–		16	0
Kuban Krasnodar	2017–18	First League	18	0	1	0	–		–		19	0
Kuban Krasnodar	Total		34	0	1	0	0	0	0	0	35	0
Sibir Novosibirsk	2018–19	First League	32	0	0	0	–		–		32	0
Fakel Voronezh	2019–20	First League	14	0	1	0	–		3 (Note: Appearances in the FNL Cup)	0	18	0
Fakel Voronezh	2020–21	First League	16	1	1	0	–		–		17	1
Fakel Voronezh	2021–22	First League	9	0	1	0	–		–		10	0
Fakel Voronezh	2022–23	RPL	1	0	4	0	–		–		5	0
Fakel Voronezh	Total		40	1	7	0	0	0	3	0	50	1
Career total			181	2	14	0	0	0	8	0	203	2
