= Sergei Narubin =

Russian footballer

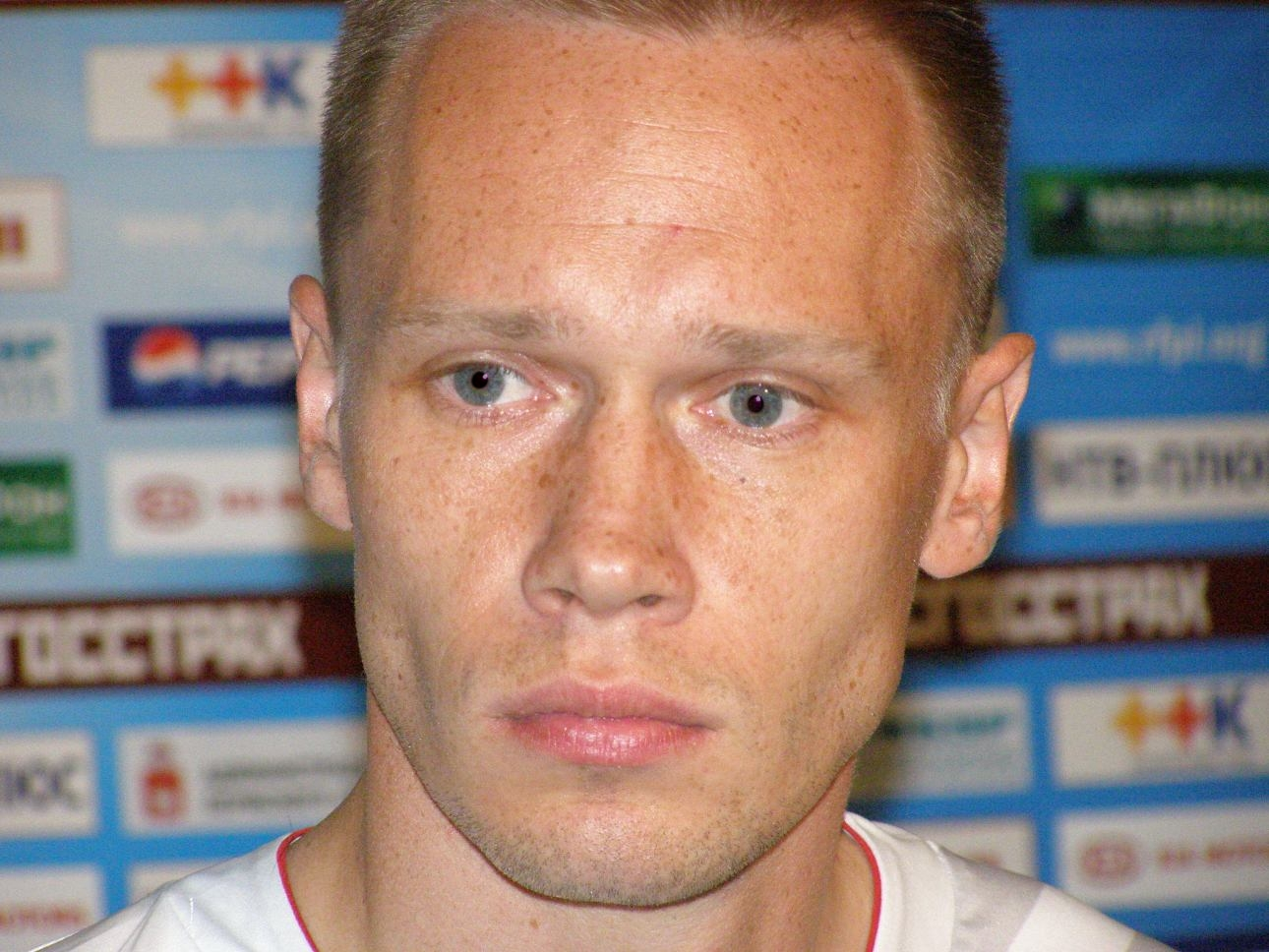

Personal information
- Full name: Sergei Vladimirovich Narubin
- Date of birth: 5 December 1981 (age 44)
- Place of birth: Moscow, Russian SFSR
- Height: 1.96 m (6 ft 5 in)
- Position: Goalkeeper

Youth career
- Trudovye Rezervy Moscow

Senior career*
Years	Team	Apps	(Gls)
2000	FC Saturn Ramenskoye	0	(0)
2001	FC Meteor Zhukovsky	26	(0)
2002	FC Fabus Bronnitsy	38	(0)
2003–2004	FC Dynamo Bryansk	67	(0)
2005	FC Alania Vladikavkaz	0	(0)
2006	FC Dynamo Bryansk	21	(0)
2007–2014	FC Amkar Perm	132	(0)
2015	FC Tosno	13	(0)
2015–2016	FC Ufa	7	(0)
2016–2017	FC Dynamo Moscow	2	(0)
- * Club domestic league appearances and goals

Sergei Vladimirovich Narubin (Russian: Серге́й Владимирович Нарубин; born 5 December 1981) is a former Russian footballer.

== Club career ==
His career went through FC Saturn Ramenskoye (2000), FC Meteor Zhukovsky (2001), FC Fabus Bronnitsy (2002), FC Dynamo Bryansk (2003–2004), FC Alania Vladikavkaz (2005), FC Dynamo Bryansk (2006), FC Amkar Perm (2007–2014). He is 1.95m tall and weighs 87 kg. His playing position is goalkeeper.

On 21 May 2011 in a Russian Premier League game he was seriously injured in a collision with FC Rostov's Kornel Saláta. He had to undergo splenectomy (surgical removal of the spleen).

=== Career statistics ===
As of 8 December 2017

Club	Season	League			Cup		Continental		Other		Total	
Club	Season	Division	Apps	Goals	Apps	Goals	Apps	Goals	Apps	Goals	Apps	Goals
FC Saturn Ramenskoye	2000	Top Division	0	0	0	0	–		–		0	0
FC Meteor Zhukovsky	2001	Amateur League	26	–39	–		–		–		26	–39
FC Fabus Bronnitsy	2002	Second Division	38	–46	2	–3	–		–		40	–49
FC Dynamo Bryansk	2003	Second Division	37	–27	1	–3	–		–		38	–30
FC Dynamo Bryansk	2004	First Division	30	–41	2	–4	–		–		32	–45
FC Alania Vladikavkaz	2005	Premier League	0	–0	1	–0	–		–		1	–0
FC Dynamo Bryansk	2006	First Division	21	–23	3	–3	–		–		24	–26
FC Dynamo Bryansk	Total (2 spells)		88	–91	6	–10	0	0	0	0	94	–101
FC Amkar Perm	2007	Premier League	0	–0	0	–0	–		–		0	–0
FC Amkar Perm	2008	Premier League	20	–16	2	–1	–		–		22	–17
FC Amkar Perm	2009	Premier League	21	–31	1	–1	2	–3	–		24	–35
FC Amkar Perm	2010	Premier League	16	–21	1	–0	–		–		17	–21
FC Amkar Perm	2011–12	Premier League	29	–25	2	–3	–		–		31	–28
FC Amkar Perm	2012–13	Premier League	21	–37	1	–1	–		–		22	–38
FC Amkar Perm	2013–14	Premier League	23	–29	0	0	–		–		23	–29
FC Amkar Perm	2014–15	Premier League	2	–8	1	–0	–		–		3	–8
FC Amkar Perm	Total		132	–167	8	–6	2	–3	0	0	142	–176
FC Tosno	2014–15	National League	13	–10	0	0	–		2 (Note: Two appearances in promotion play-offs)	–5	15	–15
FC Ufa	2015–16	Premier League	7	–11	2	–0	–		–		9	–11
FC Dynamo Moscow	2016–17	National League	2	–0	3	–4	–		–		5	–4
FC Dynamo Moscow	2017–18	Premier League	0	0	0	0	–		–		0	0
FC Dynamo Moscow	Total		2	–0	3	–4	0	0	0	0	5	–4
Career total			306	–364	22	–23	2	–3	2	–5	332	–395
