= Serhiy Harashchenkov =

Ukrainian association football player

Personal information
- Full name: Serhiy Ihorovych Harashchenkov
- Date of birth: 16 May 1990 (age 36)
- Place of birth: Novohrodivka, Donetsk Oblast, Ukrainian SSR
- Height: 1.86 m (6 ft 1 in)
- Position: Defender

Youth career
- 2003–2006: Olimpik Donetsk
- 2006–2007: Shakhtar Donetsk

Senior career*
Years	Team	Apps	(Gls)
2007–2011	Shakhtar Donetsk	0	(0)
2007–2010	→ Shakhtar-3 Donetsk	55	(4)
2008	→ Komunalnyk Luhansk (loan)	14	(2)
2011–2013	Amkar Perm	9	(0)
2013	Karpaty Lviv	4	(0)
2013–2014	Illichivets Mariupol	16	(1)
2015	Slutsk	12	(0)
2016	Hirnyk-Sport Komsomolsk	8	(0)
2018	Sumy	8	(0)
2020	Rubin Yalta		
2020–2021	PFC Yalta		

International career
2006	Ukraine-16	4	(0)
2006–2007	Ukraine-17	14	(0)
2007	Ukraine-18	3	(0)
2012	Ukraine-21	2	(0)
- * Club domestic league appearances and goals

Serhiy Ihorovych Harashchenkov (Ukrainian: Сергій Ігорович Гаращенков; born 16 May 1990) is a former Ukrainian professional football player.

== Career ==
He made his Russian Premier League debut for FC Amkar Perm on 22 October 2011 in a game against FC Terek Grozny.

In February 2013 he signed 4-years deal with FC Karpaty Lviv.

In April 2019 the player (and his last club PFC Sumy) was banned from professional football by the Ukrainian Football Federation due to match fixing by players of PFC Sumy.
