= Andrei Sekretov =

Russian footballer

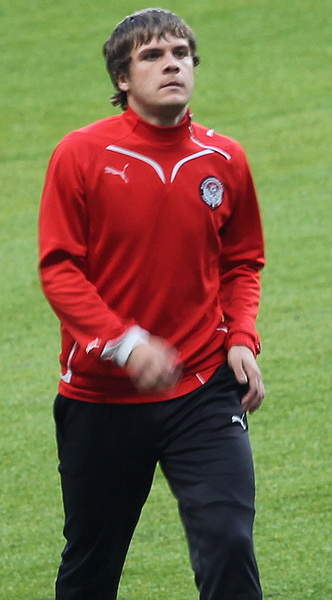

Personal information
- Full name: Andrei Vadimovich Sekretov
- Date of birth: 13 December 1989 (age 36)
- Place of birth: Perm, Russian SFSR
- Height: 1.76 m (5 ft 9 in)
- Positions: Midfielder; forward

Senior career*
Years	Team	Apps	(Gls)
2005–2012	FC Amkar Perm	18	(1)
2008	→ FC Nizhny Novgorod (loan)	7	(0)
2009	→ FC Gornyak Uchaly (loan)	0	(0)
2012	→ FC Gazovik Orenburg (loan)	7	(1)
2012	FC Oktan Perm	4	(1)
2012–2013	FC Sokol Saratov	13	(1)
2015	FC Okean Kerch		
2015–2016	FC Neftekhimik Nizhnekamsk	23	(1)
2016–2017	FC Okean Kerch		
2018–2021	FC Zvezda Perm	47	(6)
- * Club domestic league appearances and goals

Andrei Vadimovich Sekretov (Russian: Андрей Вадимович Секретов; born 13 December 1989) is a Russian former professional football player.

== Club career ==
He made his Russian Premier League debut for FC Amkar Perm on 22 August 2010 in a game against FC Sibir Novosibirsk.
