= Ilya Mikhalyov =

Ukrainian footballer

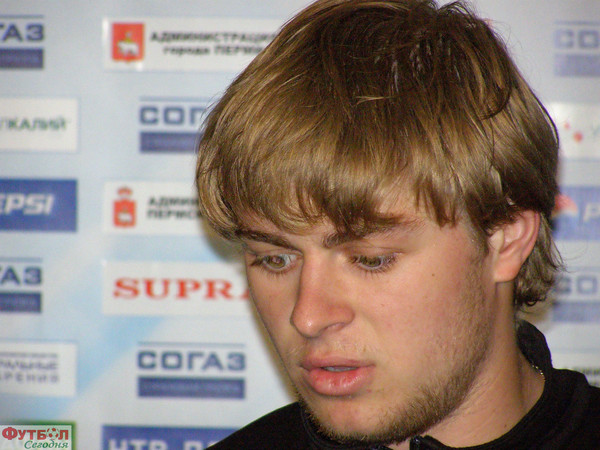

Personal information
- Full name: Ilya Ruslanovych Mikhalyov
- Date of birth: 31 July 1990 (age 36)
- Place of birth: Makiivka, Ukrainian SSR, Soviet Union
- Height: 1.87 m (6 ft 1 1/2 in)
- Position: Forward

Youth career
- 2003–2007: Shakhtar Donetsk

Senior career*
Years	Team	Apps	(Gls)
2007–2010	Shakhtar Donetsk	0	(0)
2007–2009	→ Shakhtar-3 Donetsk	24	(6)
2009	→ Metalurh Donetsk (loan)	0	(0)
2010	→ Olimpik Donetsk (loan)	10	(2)
2010–2012	Amkar Perm	26	(4)
2012–2016	Karpaty Lviv	2	(0)
2012	→ Oleksandriya (loan)	16	(1)
2013	→ Khimki (loan)	4	(0)
2013	→ Luch Vladivostok (loan)	20	(5)
2014	→ Neftekhimik (loan)	12	(7)
2014–2015	→ Tom Tomsk (loan)	21	(4)
2015	→ Tosno (loan)	16	(3)
2016	Aktobe	8	(0)
2016–2017	Luch Vladivostok	30	(3)
2017	Olimpik Donetsk	6	(0)
2018	Kolkheti Poti	20	(7)
2019	Shevardeni-1906	2	(0)
2019	Guria	7	(0)
2020	Masis		

International career
2006–2007	Ukraine-17	13	(2)
2007	Ukraine-18	3	(0)
2011	Ukraine-21	3	(0)
- * Club domestic league appearances and goals

Ilya Mikhalyov (Ukrainian: Ілля Русланович Міхальов; born 31 July 1990) is a Russian former football forward.
