= Aleksandr Kolomeytsev =

Russian footballer

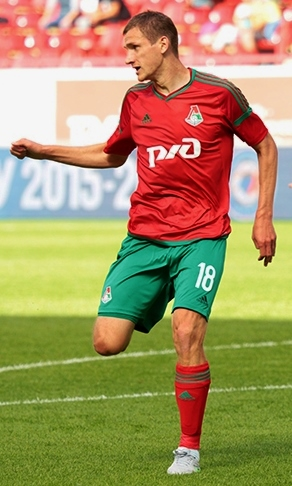
- Kolomeytsev with Lokomotiv in 2015

Personal information
- Full name: Aleksandr Vladimirovich Kolomeytsev
- Date of birth: 21 February 1989 (age 37)
- Place of birth: Surgut, Russian SFSR
- Height: 1.83 m (6 ft 0 in)
- Position: Midfielder

Youth career
- Spartak-2 Moscow

Senior career*
Years	Team	Apps	(Gls)
2006–2008	Torpedo Moscow	31	(1)
2009	Sportakademklub	13	(4)
2009	FC Moscow	0	(0)
2010–2015	Amkar Perm	138	(9)
2015–2020	Lokomotiv Moscow	76	(7)

International career
2010	Russia U-21	1	(0)
2011	Russia-2	2	(0)
- * Club domestic league appearances and goals

Aleksandr Vladimirovich Kolomeytsev (Russian: Александр Владимирович Коломейцев; born 21 February 1989) is a former Russian professional football player who played as a centre midfielder.

== Club career ==
He made his Russian Premier League debut for FC Amkar Perm on 15 August 2010 in a game against FC Lokomotiv Moscow. After 5 seasons with Amkar, he signed with FC Lokomotiv Moscow.

He retired on 29 July 2020.

== Honours ==
=== Club ===
Lokomotiv Moscow

- Russian Premier League: 2017–18
- Russian Cup: 2016–17

== Career statistics ==
=== Club ===
Club	Season	League			Cup		Continental		Other		Total	
Club	Season	Division	Apps	Goals	Apps	Goals	Apps	Goals	Apps	Goals	Apps	Goals
FC Torpedo Moscow	2006	Russian Premier League	0	0	0	0	–		–		0	0
FC Spartak-2-2 Moscow	2007	Amateur	–									
FC Torpedo Moscow	2008	FNL	31	1	0	0	–		–		31	1
FC Torpedo Moscow	Total (2 spells)		31	1	0	0	0	0	0	0	31	1
FC Sportakademklub Moscow	2009	PFL	13	4	0	0	–		–		13	4
FC Amkar Perm	2010	Russian Premier League	19	1	1	0	–		–		20	1
FC Amkar Perm	2011–12	Russian Premier League	42	2	3	1	–		–		45	3
FC Amkar Perm	2012–13	Russian Premier League	25	2	1	0	–		–		26	2
FC Amkar Perm	2013–14	Russian Premier League	24	1	1	0	–		–		25	1
FC Amkar Perm	2014–15	Russian Premier League	28	3	1	0	–		–		29	3
FC Amkar Perm	Total		138	9	7	1	0	0	0	0	145	10
FC Lokomotiv Moscow	2015–16	Russian Premier League	28	3	2	0	7	0	1 (Note: One appearance in Russian Super Cup)	0	38	3
FC Lokomotiv Moscow	2016–17	Russian Premier League	19	2	3	0	–		–		22	2
FC Lokomotiv Moscow	2017–18	Russian Premier League	19	1	1	0	8	0	1 (Note: One appearance in Russian Super Cup)	0	29	1
FC Lokomotiv Moscow	2018–19	Russian Premier League	0	0	0	0	0	0	0	0	0	0
FC Lokomotiv Moscow	2019–20	Russian Premier League	10	1	1	0	3	0	1 (Note: One appearance in Russian Super Cup)	0	15	1
FC Lokomotiv Moscow	Total		76	7	7	0	18	0	3	0	104	7
Career total			258	21	14	1	18	0	3	0	293	22
