= Mitar Novaković =

Montenegrin footballer (born 1981)

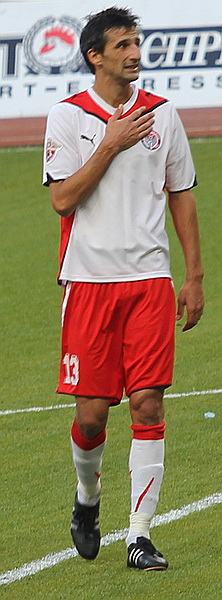
- Novaković with Amkar in 2010

Personal information
- Date of birth: 27 September 1981 (age 45)
- Place of birth: Bar, SR Montenegro, Yugoslavia
- Height: 1.89 m (6 ft 2 1/2 in)
- Position: Midfielder

Senior career*
Years	Team	Apps	(Gls)
1998–1999	Mornar	4	(0)
1999–2001	Zvezdara	5	(0)
2001	BSK Borča	19	(2)
2001–2003	Čukarički	49	(7)
2003	Radnički Beograd	4	(1)
2003–2005	Železnik	49	(4)
2005–2006	Rad	26	(3)
2006–2008	OFK Beograd	54	(7)
2008–2013	Amkar Perm	126	(5)
2014	OFK Beograd	3	(0)
2015	Mornar	4	(1)

International career
2002–2003	Serbia and Montenegro U21	7	(0)
2007–2013	Montenegro	25	(0)
- * Club domestic league appearances and goals

Mitar Novaković (Serbian Cyrillic: Митар Новаковић; born 27 September 1981) is a Montenegrin retired footballer who played as a central midfielder. Internationally, Novaković represented Montenegro, making 25 appearances between 2007 and 2013.

== Club career ==
He had a lengthy spell in Russian football with Amkar Perm. After a short break from playing football, he rejoined hometown club Mornar in July 2015.

== International career ==
Novaković made his debut for Montenegro in a September 2007 friendly match against Sweden in Podgorica and has earned a total of 25 caps, scoring no goals. His final international was an August 2013 friendly away against Belarus.
