= Ivan Cherenchikov =

Russian footballer

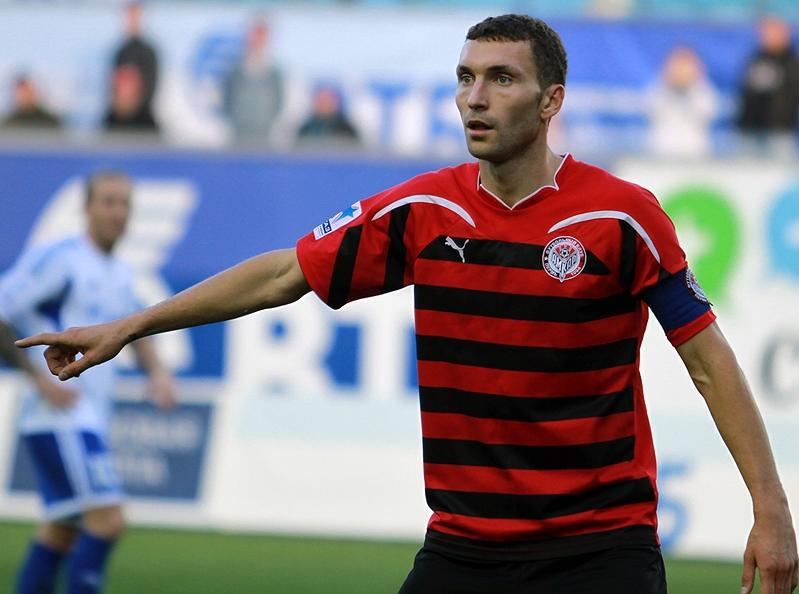
- Cherenchikov with Amkar in 2011

Personal information
- Full name: Ivan Andreyevich Cherenchikov
- Date of birth: 25 August 1984 (age 42)
- Place of birth: Ozyorsk, Soviet Union
- Height: 1.87 m (6 ft 1 1/2 in)
- Positions: Defender; midfielder

Youth career
- Dinamovets Ozyorsk

Senior career*
Years	Team	Apps	(Gls)
2002–2017	FC Amkar Perm	242	(6)
2017	FC Baltika Kaliningrad	8	(0)

International career
2006	Russia U-21	6	(0)

Managerial career
- 2020–2021: FC Zvezda Perm (assistant)
- 2021–2023: FC Amkar Perm (assistant)
- 2023: FC Amkar Perm
- * Club domestic league appearances and goals

Ivan Andreyevich Cherenchikov (Russian: Иван Андреевич Черенчиков; born 25 August 1984) is a Russian football coach and a former player.

== Career statistics ==
As of 5 July 2014

Club	Div	Season	League		Cup		Europe		Total	
Club	Div	Season	Apps	Goals	Apps	Goals	Apps	Goals	Apps	Goals
(Russia) Amkar Perm	D2	2002	7	0	0	0	—		7	0
(Russia) Amkar Perm	D2	2003	15	0	0	0	—		15	0
(Russia) Amkar Perm	D1	2004	3	0	1	0	—		4	0
(Russia) Amkar Perm	D1	2005	5	0	3	0	—		8	0
(Russia) Amkar Perm	D1	2006	27	1	3	0	—		30	1
(Russia) Amkar Perm	D1	2007	9	1	2	0	—		11	1
(Russia) Amkar Perm	D1	2008	25	0	4	0	—		29	0
(Russia) Amkar Perm	D1	2009	26	1	1	0	2	0	29	1
(Russia) Amkar Perm	D1	2010	19	2	0	0	—		19	2
(Russia) Amkar Perm	D1	2011-12	29	0	3	0	—		32	0
(Russia) Amkar Perm	D1	2012-13	26	0	0	0	—		26	0
(Russia) Amkar Perm	D1	2013-14	13	1	0	0	—		13	1
(Russia) Amkar Perm	Total		204	6	17	0	2	0	223	6
Career total			204	6	17	0	2	0	223	6
