= Dmitry Belorukov =

Russian footballer

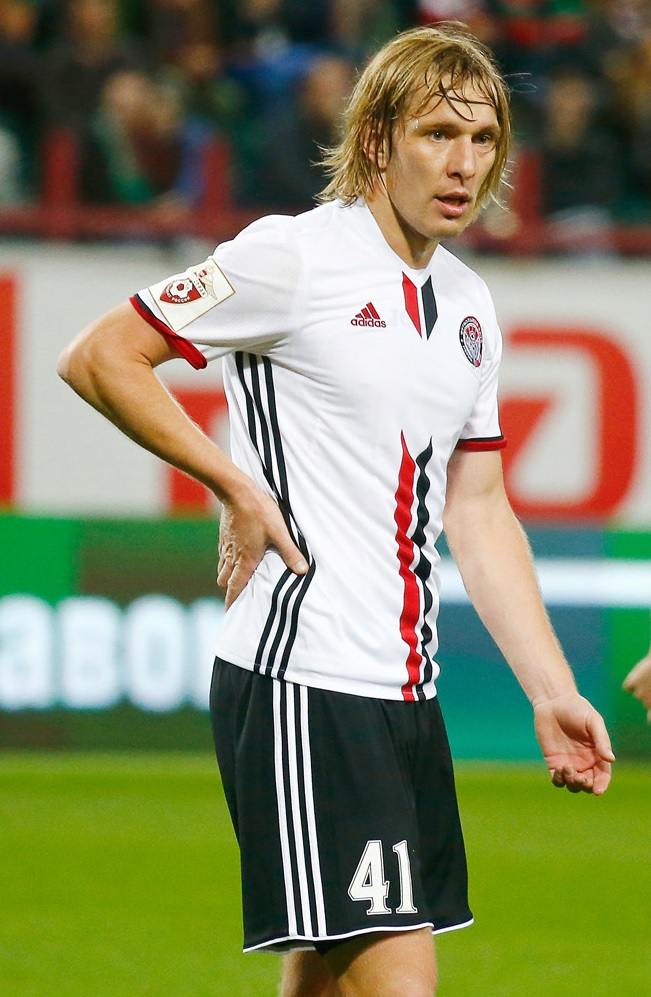
- Belorukov with Amkar Perm in 2017

Personal information
- Full name: Dmitry Aleksandrovich Belorukov
- Date of birth: 24 March 1983 (age 43)
- Place of birth: Leningrad, Soviet Union
- Height: 1.93 m (6 ft 4 in)
- Position: Central defender

Team information
- Current team: FC Orenburg (assistant manager)

Youth career
- Olympic Reserve school St. Petersburg

Senior career*
Years	Team	Apps	(Gls)
2002	FC Petrotrest St. Petersburg		
2002–2003	FC Zenit-2 Saint Petersburg	51	(1)
2004	FC Anzhi Makhachkala	19	(0)
2005–2016	FC Amkar Perm	255	(16)
2016–2018	FC Dynamo Moscow	24	(2)
2017–2018	→ FC Amkar Perm (loan)	19	(0)
2018–2019	FC Anzhi Makhachkala	9	(0)

International career
2005	Russia U-21	5	(0)

Managerial career
- 2020–2021: FC Zvezda Perm (coach-scout)
- 2021–2022: FC Amkar Perm (assistant)
- 2022–2024: FC Dynamo Saint Petersburg
- 2024–2025: FC KAMAZ Naberezhnye Chelny (assistant)
- 2025–: FC Orenburg (assistant)
- * Club domestic league appearances and goals

Dmitry Aleksandrovich Belorukov (Russian: Дмитрий Александрович Белоруков; born 24 March 1983) is a Russian football coach and a former player who played as a centre-back. He is an assistant coach with FC Orenburg.

== Career statistics ==
=== Club ===
As of 10 December 2017

Club	Season	League			Cup		Continental		Other		Total	
Club	Season	Division	Apps	Goals	Apps	Goals	Apps	Goals	Apps	Goals	Apps	Goals
FC Petrotrest Saint Petersburg	2002	Russian Amateur Football League	–									
FC Zenit-2 Saint Petersburg	2002	PFL	18	1	0	0	–		–		18	1
FC Zenit-2 Saint Petersburg	2003	PFL	33	0	1	0	–		–		34	0
FC Zenit-2 Saint Petersburg	Total		51	1	1	0	0	0	0	0	52	1
FC Anzhi Makhachkala	2004	FNL	19	0	1	0	–		–		20	0
FC Amkar Perm	2005	Russian Premier League	23	2	5	0	–		–		28	2
FC Amkar Perm	2006	Russian Premier League	26	0	3	0	–		–		29	0
FC Amkar Perm	2007	Russian Premier League	28	4	4	0	–		–		32	4
FC Amkar Perm	2008	Russian Premier League	25	1	4	0	–		–		29	1
FC Amkar Perm	2009	Russian Premier League	28	3	1	0	2	0	–		31	3
FC Amkar Perm	2010	Russian Premier League	24	1	1	0	–		–		25	1
FC Amkar Perm	2011–12	Russian Premier League	28	2	2	0	–		–		30	2
FC Amkar Perm	2012–13	Russian Premier League	15	0	0	0	–		–		15	0
FC Amkar Perm	2013–14	Russian Premier League	25	2	1	0	–		–		26	2
FC Amkar Perm	2014–15	Russian Premier League	15	0	0	0	–		–		15	0
FC Amkar Perm	2015–16	Russian Premier League	18	1	3	0	–		–		21	1
FC Dynamo Moscow	2016–17	FNL	24	2	0	0	–		–		24	2
FC Dynamo Moscow	2017–18	Russian Premier League	0	0	0	0	–		–		0	0
FC Dynamo Moscow	Total		24	2	0	0	0	0	0	0	24	2
FC Amkar Perm	2017–18	Russian Premier League	19	0	2	0	–		2 (Note: Two appearances in relegation play-offs)	0	23	0
FC Amkar Perm	Total (2 spells)		274	16	26	0	2	0	2	0	304	16
Career total			368	19	28	0	2	0	2	0	400	19
