= Vitali Grishin =

Russian footballer and coach

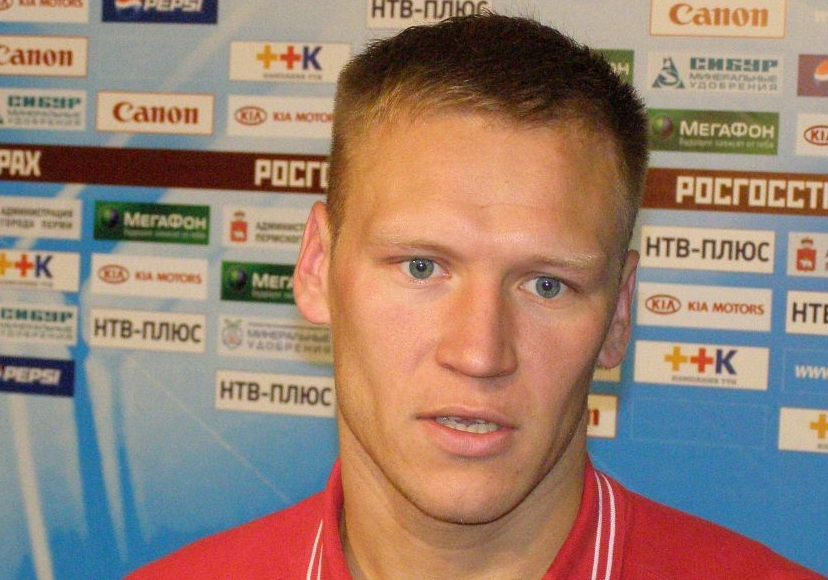

Personal information
- Full name: Vitali Nikolayevich Grishin
- Date of birth: 9 September 1980 (age 46)
- Place of birth: Moscow, Soviet Union
- Height: 1.81 m (5 ft 11 1/2 in)
- Positions: Left midfielder; left wing back

Team information
- Current team: FC Neftekhimik Nizhnekamsk (assistant manager)

Youth career
- Trudovye Rezervy Moscow

Senior career*
Years	Team	Apps	(Gls)
1997–2003	FC Dynamo Moscow	94	(8)
2003–2004	FC Vorskla Poltava	15	(0)
2004–2005	FC Khimki	57	(7)
2006–2013	FC Amkar Perm	168	(11)
2013–2014	FC Khimki	27	(2)

International career
2000–2001	Russia U-21	11	(0)

Managerial career
- 2014–2019: FC Dynamo Moscow (academy coach)
- 2019: FC Dynamo Moscow (U21 assistant)
- 2019–2020: FC Dynamo Moscow (assistant)
- 2020–2023: FC Dynamo-2 Moscow (assistant)
- 2023–: FC Neftekhimik Nizhnekamsk (assistant)
- * Club domestic league appearances and goals

Vitali Nikolayevich Grishin (Виталий Николаевич Гришин; born 9 September 1980) is a Russian football coach and a former player. He is an assistant coach of FC Neftekhimik Nizhnekamsk.
