= Sergei Volkov (footballer, born 1980) =

Russian footballer

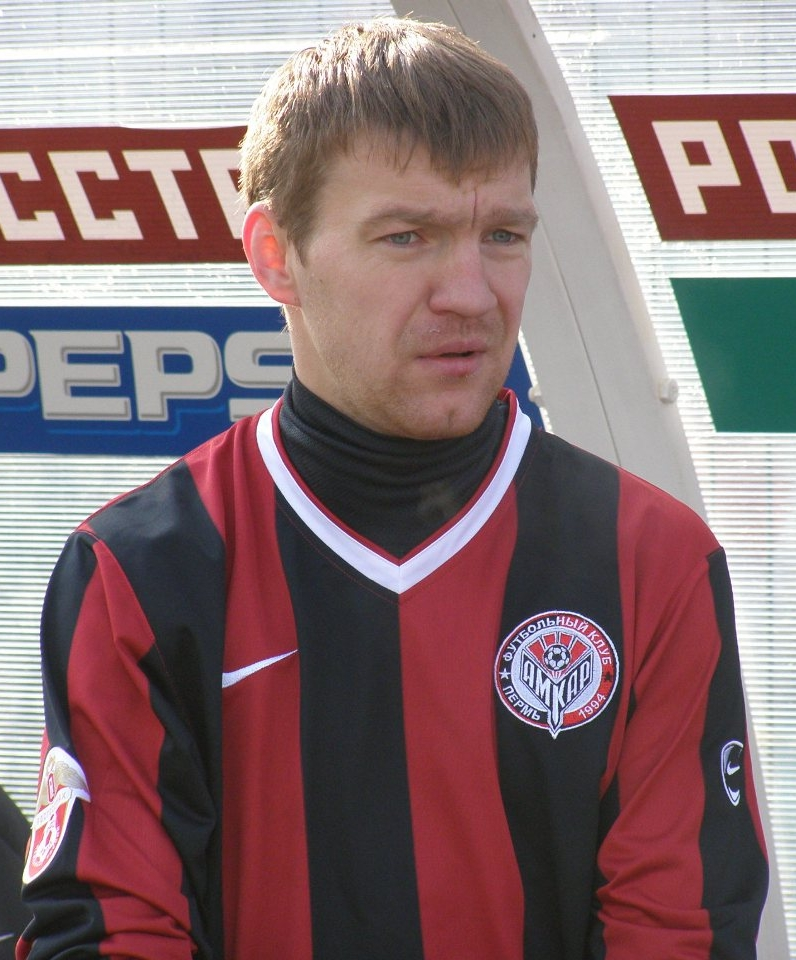

Personal information
- Full name: Sergei Yuryevich Volkov
- Date of birth: 27 September 1980 (age 46)
- Place of birth: Kaluga, Russian SFSR
- Height: 1.75 m (5 ft 9 in)
- Position: Second striker

Youth career
- Smena Kaluga

Senior career*
| Years | Team | Apps | (Gls) |
| 1998–2002 | FC Lokomotiv Kaluga | 139 | (12) |
| 2003–2013 | FC Amkar Perm | 216 | (21) |

Managerial career
- 2023: FC Amkar Perm (assistant)
- * Club domestic league appearances and goals

Sergei Yuryevich Volkov (Russian: Серге́й Юрьевич Волков; born 27 September 1980) is a Russian football coach and a former striker.

== Club career ==
He made his Russian Premier League debut for FC Amkar Perm on 13 March 2004 in a game against FC Kuban Krasnodar.

== Career statistics ==
As of 28 August 2013

| Club | Div | Season | League | | Cup | | Europe | | Total | |
| Club | Div | Season | Apps | Goals | Apps | Goals | Apps | Goals | Apps | Goals |
|---|---|---|---|---|---|---|---|---|---|---|
| (Russia) Amkar Perm | D2 | 2003 | 35 | 6 | 2 | 0 | — | | 37 | 6 |
| (Russia) Amkar Perm | D1 | 2004 | 27 | 2 | 2 | 1 | — | | 29 | 3 |
| (Russia) Amkar Perm | D1 | 2005 | 23 | 5 | 3 | 0 | — | | 26 | 5 |
| (Russia) Amkar Perm | D1 | 2006 | 24 | 1 | 1 | 0 | — | | 25 | 1 |
| (Russia) Amkar Perm | D1 | 2007 | 24 | 0 | 4 | 1 | — | | 28 | 1 |
| (Russia) Amkar Perm | D1 | 2008 | 11 | 2 | 1 | 0 | — | | 12 | 2 |
| (Russia) Amkar Perm | D1 | 2009 | 14 | 2 | 0 | 0 | 0 | 0 | 14 | 2 |
| (Russia) Amkar Perm | D1 | 2010 | 20 | 2 | 0 | 0 | — | | 20 | 2 |
| (Russia) Amkar Perm | D1 | 2011-12 | 28 | 1 | 2 | 0 | — | | 30 | 1 |
| (Russia) Amkar Perm | D1 | 2012-13 | 9 | 0 | 0 | 0 | — | | 9 | 0 |
| Total | | | 215 | 21 | 15 | 2 | 0 | 0 | 230 | 23 |
| Career total | | | 215 | 21 | 15 | 2 | 0 | 0 | 230 | 23 |
