= Yevgeni Tyukalov =

Russian footballer

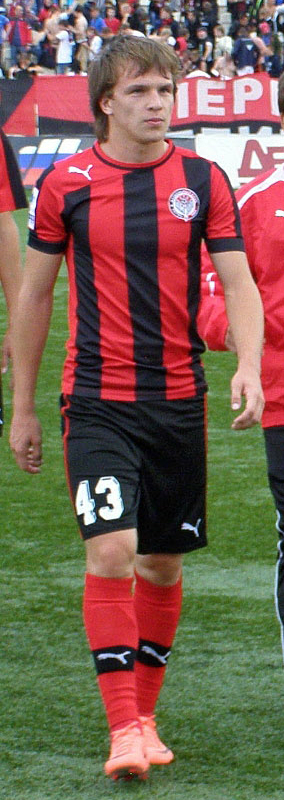
- Tyukalov with Amkar in 2012

Personal information
- Full name: Yevgeni Yevgenyevich Tyukalov
- Date of birth: 7 August 1992 (age 34)
- Place of birth: Perm, Russia
- Height: 1.80 m (5 ft 11 in)
- Positions: Midfielder; forward

Team information
- Current team: Amkar Perm

Senior career*
Years	Team	Apps	(Gls)
2011–2015	Amkar Perm	19	(1)
2015–2016	União de Leiria	12	(4)
2016	Infonet Tallinn	13	(0)
2016	→ Infonet Tallinn II	5	(7)
2016	Slavia Sofia	3	(0)
2017	Ararat Moscow (amateur)		
2017–2018	KAMAZ	22	(5)
2018–2021	Zvezda Perm	64	(24)
2021–	Amkar Perm	143	(41)

International career
2011	Russia U-19	3	(0)
2012	Russia U-20	1	(0)
- * Club domestic league appearances and goals as of 17 October 2026

Yevgeni Yevgenyevich Tyukalov (Russian: Евгений Евгеньевич Тюкалов; born 7 August 1992) is a Russian professional footballer who plays for Amkar Perm.

== Career ==
Tyukalov made his Russian Premier League debut for Amkar Perm on 25 September 2011 in a game against Rostov.

In 2016, he had a short stint in Bulgarian club Slavia Sofia.
