= FC Oktan Perm =

- Full name: Football Club Oktan Perm
- Founded: 1958
- Dissolved: 2014
- Ground: Zvezda Stadium
- Capacity: 19,500
- 2013–14: Russian Professional Football League, Zone Ural-Povolzhye, 3rd

FC Oktan Perm (Russian: ФК «Октан» Пермь) was a Russian football club from Perm, founded in 1958. It played its first professional season in the Russian Second Division in 2011. After the 2013–14 season, it was dissolved.

In 2006-2010 it played in Amateur Football League, zone Ural and West Siberia, finished there 2nd in 2009, 2010, and 3rd in 2007. The team won the Ural and West Siberia Cup in 2006, 2009, 2010, and was its runner-up in 2008. It twice participated in the Russian Cup being an amateur club.

== Team name history ==
- 1958–1990: FC Neftyanik Perm
- 1990–1995: FC Neftekhimik Perm
- 1996–2014: FC Oktan Perm
