= FC Amkar Perm =

Amkar Perm
- Full name: Общественная организация г. Перми «Футбольный клуб «Амкар» (Community organization of Perm city "Football Club 'Amkar'")
- Nicknames: Krasno-chernye (The Red and Blacks), permyaki, ammiachniye
- Founded: 1994; 32 years ago
- Ground: Zvezda Stadium
- Capacity: 14,999
- Chairman: Dmitry Martynov
- Manager: Igor Belyayev
- League: Russian Second League, Division A, Gold Group
- 2026–27: First stage: Silver Group, 2nd
- Website: amkar-perm.ru
Home colours	Away colours	Third colours

FC Amkar Perm (Russian: Футбо́льный клуб "Амка́р" Пермь [fʊdˈbolʲnɨj ˈklup ɐmˈkar ˈpʲermʲ]) is a professional football club. Originally founded in 1994, it is based in the city of Perm. It was a participant in second-tier football from 1995 and in the Russian Premier League from 2004 to 2018, after which it was dissolved. Amkar's home stadium was the Zvezda Stadium.

In August 2020, it was re-established by the Government of the Perm Krai as an amateur club, and became professional the following year.

== History ==
=== 1994–1999: Third and second league ===
The Amkar football club was created to represent the Perm Inorganic Fertilizer Company. The club's "birthday" is 8 May 1993, although it was only registered officially on 6 December 1994. The name "Amkar" derives from a combination of parts of the Russian words "AMmiak" (ammonia) and "KARbamid (carbamide, urea) – these two substances being the main products of the plant. The team owes the choice of club colours (red and black) to its Italian trade partners from the city of Milan, who responded to a request for help by offering equipment from A.C. Milan. And so the club colours became red and black. The basis of the new team was made up of company employees. In 1994, Amkar, strengthened by amateur players from other city teams and a few former professionals, became champion of the city of Perm and the Perm region and also won the regional Cup. The club was officially registered on 6 December 1994 and applied to participate in the Russian football league. Amkar was included in the third league of the Russian Championship.

In 1995, the team, reinforced by former players of Zvezda Perm, was second in the sixth group of the third league and qualified for the second league. In 1996, Amkar finished in third place in the central group of the second league and in 1997, the club was second in the tournament.

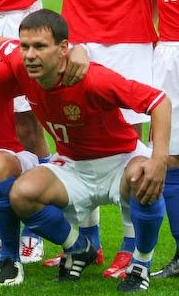
Konstantin Zyryanov – best known player from Perm

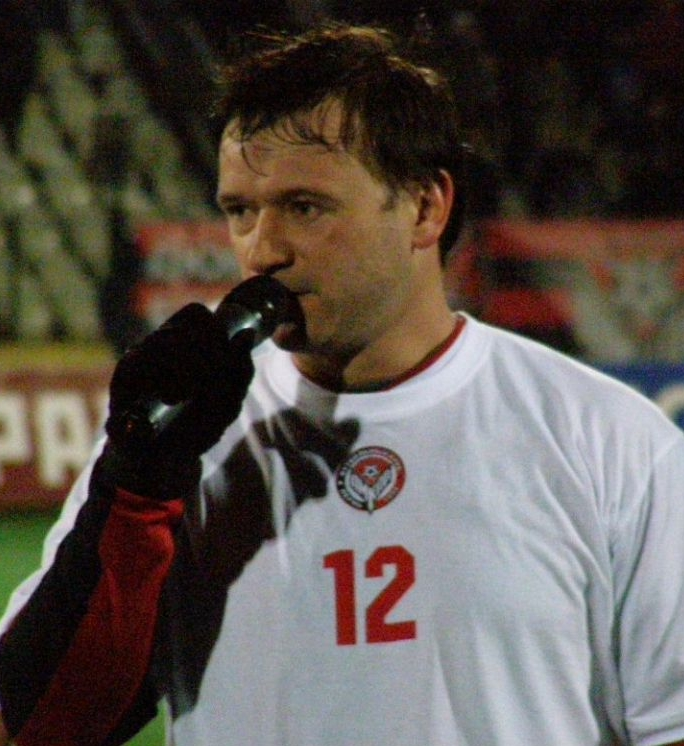
Konstantin Paramonov – most prolific goal scorer in Amkar's history – 170 goals

On 12 September 1998, Spartak Moscow paid a visit to Amkar for a Russian Cup tie. Spartak's previous visit to the Western Urals was in 1977 as a first division side, when they were close to a return to the top tier of domestic football. The match attracted enormous interest and the 25,000-capacity stadium was filled to capacity for the first time in its 30-year history. The match finished 1–0 in favour of Amkar. In the league, "Permyaki" accumulated 93% of the possible number of points and scored 100 goals. Amkar took first place and earned the right to play in the First Division.

=== 1999–2004. First Division ===
From 1999 to 2003, the team performed reasonably well in the First Division, finishing each year in the top six. In the 2001–02 season, the club reached the semi-final of the Russian Cup but lost to CSKA Moscow 0–1. In 2003, with two matches left to play, Amkar was in fourth position, one point behind Kuban Krasnodar and losing out to Tom Tomsk and Terek Grozny on the total number of wins. According to the pundits, Amkar and Terek would be losers in this four-horse race but a sensational draw between Tom and Baltika Kaliningrad made the red and blacks favourites. In the final match, Kuban and Terek played each other. To move up into the Premier League, Amkar needed a win against Fakel Voronezh, which was duly achieved.

=== 2004–2008 ===
In the Premier League, Amkar finished 11th, 12th and 13th in 2004, 2005 and 2006 respectively. Before the first season in the Premier League, Amkar was strengthened by Ivan Levenets, Oleksandr Shutov, Vladimir Leonchenko, Zahari Sirakov, Andrei Lavrik, Ghenadie Olexici, Noureddine Ziyati and Erik Lincar. In the 2004–05 season, Amkar repeated its success in the Russian Cup, once more reaching the semi-finals, but losing on aggregate 0–2 to Khimki. There were many memorable matches in the 2005 season, including a 1–0 home win over Zenit Saint Petersburg, a large 4–1 win over Dynamo Moscow and a 3–4 defeat to Lokomotiv Moscow, despite Amkar leading 3–0 at half-time. In the middle of the 2006 season, head coach Sergei Oborin resigned and was replaced by Rashid Rakhimov. Amkar began to play very good football, and in the part of the championship between the 19th and 30th rounds, Amkar was in fourth-place in the league. In the same season, Amkar had the longest series of matches in the Premier League without conceding a goal, with 15.

=== 2008. The most successful season ===
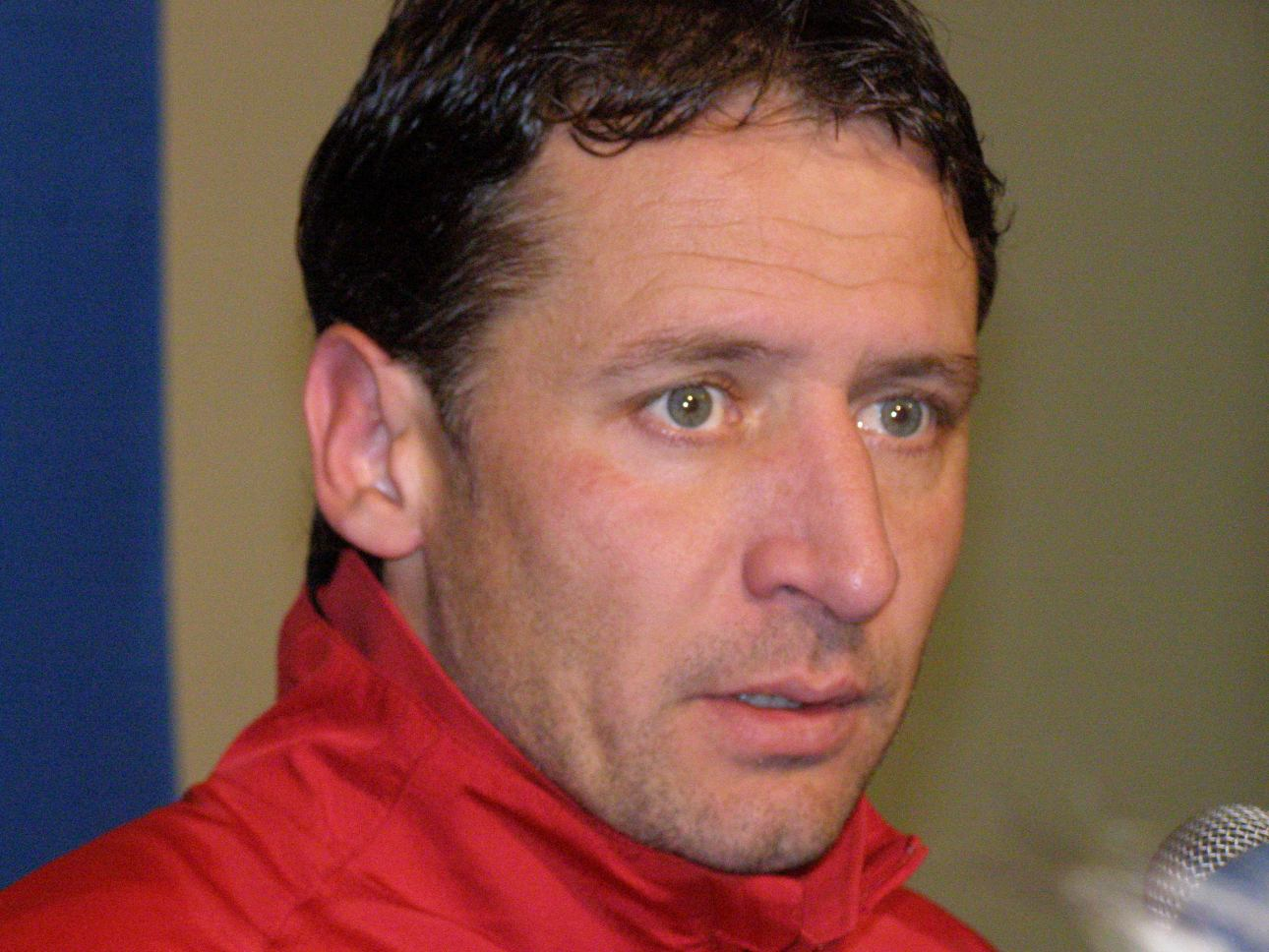
Martin Kushev – Amkar top scorer in Premier League – 36 goals

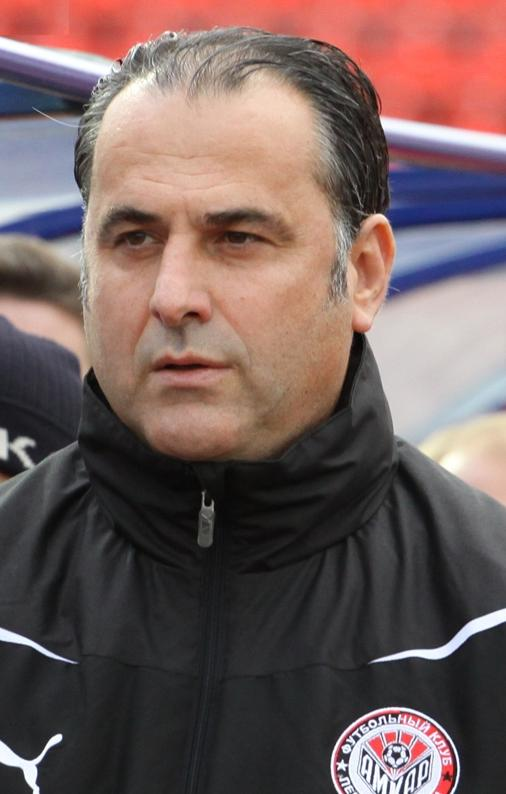
Miodrag Božović – Amkar head coach in 2008 and 2011–12 seasons

In 2007, the club made two key acquisitions: Georgi Peev arrived from Dynamo Kyiv and Nikola Drinčić from Turkish club Gaziantepspor. These players became leaders of the team and during the season the team was no longer forced to struggle for survival and could play more confidently, but several factors prevented it from rising higher than eighth place. However, in the 2007–08 Russian Cup, Amkar achieved its best result in its history. On 16 April 2008, the club beat Ural Yekaterinburg 1–0 and reached the final, losing to CSKA Moscow in a penalty shootout.

Before the start of the 2008 season, head coach Rashid Rakhimov left the club for Lokomotiv Moscow and was replaced by a little-known specialist from Montenegro, Miodrag Božović. Before the break for UEFA Euro 2008, Amkar was in third place in the standings, one point behind second-placed Spartak Moscow and six adrift of leaders Rubin Kazan. After the break, one of Amkar's team leaders, Vladimir Gabulov, and the captain, Aleksei Popov, left the team to join Dynamo Moscow and Rubin Kazan respectively. Two matches in a row on the "equator" of the Championship Amkar could have topped the league table but was unable to beat Tom Tomsk and Spartak Nalchik at home. On 16 November, after beating Tom in Tomsk, with one match left to play, the team from the Urals secured fourth place in the league to earn a spot in the qualifying round of the UEFA Europa League. Once more, Amkar had the best record in the Premier League for not conceding goals, with 17 matches. The 2008 season had been the best in the history of Amkar.

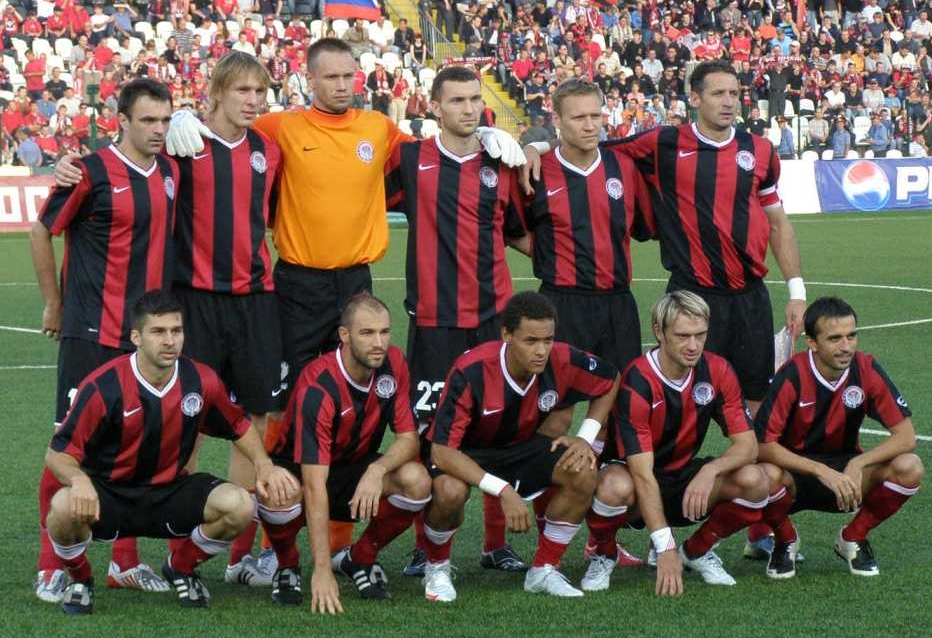
Amkar in the Europa League 2009/10

=== 2009–2011 ===
The following season, Dimitar Dimitrov, having replaced Miodrag Božović, was unable to continue the success of his predecessor. For the first five rounds of the 2009 Championship, the team conceded just one goal, but thereafter began to commit gross mistakes in defence on a regular basis, as a result of which the club was left fighting for survival. On 27 August, Amkar played hosts to English Premier League club Fulham in the second leg of the 2009–10 UEFA Europa League play-off match, having lost the first leg in London 1–3, which left little hope of reaching the group stage of the tournament. The match in Perm was played before a full stadium and Amkar won 1–0, but that was not enough to go through to the next round. After the 20th round of the Championship, Rashid Rakhimov returned as head coach with the specific task of retaining the club's place in the Premier League, a task which he successfully fulfilled. Notably, in the 2009 Russian Championship, Amkar's goalkeepers saved four penalties out of five.

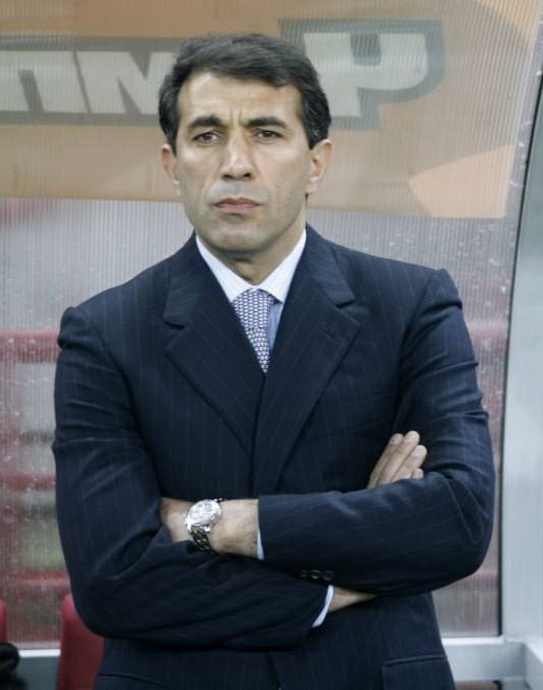
Rashid Rakhimov – Amkar head coach in 2006–2007 and 2009–2011

In the Russian Cup, Amkar defeated the two Avangard clubs from Kursk and Podolsk, then in the quarter-final was awarded a technical victory over the defunct FC Moscow. However, on 21 April 2010, Amkar lost at home in the semi-final to Zenit in a penalty shoot-out, having played full-time and extra time 0–0. In the 2010 season, fighting for survival until the very end, for the first time not having won a single match away from home and scoring the fewest goals, Amkar finished in 14th place and retained their place in the Premier League. After the final whistle had sounded in the last match of the season, Martin Kushev, captain and one of the best players in the history of the club, the team's top scorer in the Premier League, having played for Amkar from 2005 until 2010, announced the end of his career as a player. After the completion of his playing career at Amkar, Martin should have become assistant coach to Rakhimov, but the management offered him a place in the coaching staff of the youth team. Kushev preferred to return to Bulgaria to join Slavia Sofia. Six months later, he became head coach of Slavia.

On 21 December 2010, a statement to the effect that Amkar was voluntarily to join the First Division due to financial difficulties appeared on the club's official website. As a result, supporters of the club attempted to raise funds in support of Amkar, appealing to representatives of Perm business circles. However, the powers that be did not rate the actions of the supporters highly. Gennady Shilov stated that he was prepared to replace retiring Valery Chuprakov as club president. Shilov also stated an intent to approach the regional authorities for help and to look for sponsors. The Premier League gave Amkar until 15 January. On 25 January 2011 Amkar withdrew its request to leave the Premier League.

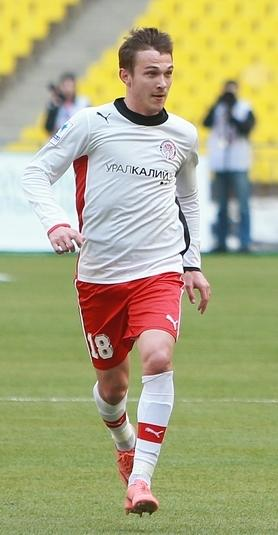
Nikita Burmistrov

In 2011, the club began to give more opportunities to young players such as Mikhalyov, Kolomeytsev, Burmistrov and Sekretov. The team had an inconsistent season, memorable for the club and the fans were dramatic matches with Kuban Krasnodar, which ended in a 3–2 defeat, a 1–1 draw with Zenit at the Petrovsky Stadium and a 2–1 victory over Spartak Moscow at the Luzhniki Stadium. On 28 September 2011, after a series of ten matches without a win in official matches, the club parted with Rashid Rakhimov by mutual consent. The next day, 29 September 2011, the team introduced its new head coach, Miodrag Božović, who had been head of Amkar in 2008 and led the club to fourth place in the Russian Championship and the final of the National Cup. After the first half of the 2011–12 Russian Championship season, the team was in 12th place.

=== After 2011 ===
On 11 June 2012, Miodrag Božović resigned once more as head coach and the Youth Team Head Coach, Rustem Khuzin, was appointed acting head coach. Under their new coach Amkar, for the first time in their history, the club beat CSKA Moscow (3–1) in the second half of the Championship. In the 12th round match against Terek Grozny, Amkar appeared in new kit with the Uralkali logo. However, the team played poorly for the rest of the season, managing only four points from their last eight games (an away win over Lokomotiv Moscow and a draw away to Mordovia Saransk).

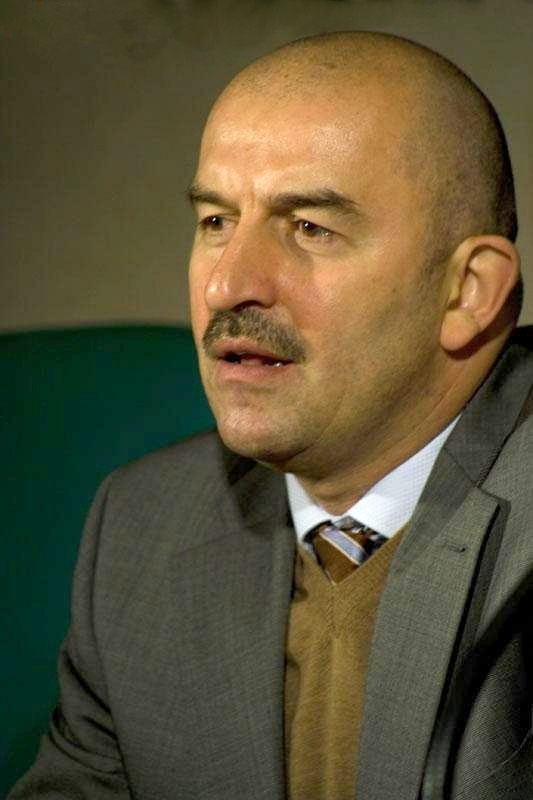
Stanislav Cherchesov – appointed head coach in 2013

On 17 January 2013, since Rustem Huzin had been accepted on a coaching course for his UEFA Pro Licence, he became eligible for the post of head coach, and Trubachev's contract was terminated. From then on, Huzin officially served as Amkar's head coach. Under Huzin, Amkar recorded its biggest ever victory in the Premier League over Alania Vladikavkaz (5–1), and then played out draws with Dynamo Moscow (1–1), and Rubin Kazan (1–1), having lost their Spring matches to Kuban Krasnodar (1–2) and Spartak Moscow (0–2). A series without a win followed the victory over Alania and after the Dynamo match Amkar lost to Terek Grozny (1–2) and Lokomotiv Moscow (2–4). After another devastating defeat from Kuban (0–4), followed by a victory over their direct rivals Rostov (3–2), and a goalless draw with Zenit, the club retained the right to play in the Premier League.

In June 2013, the club opted not to renew the contracts of Rustem Huzin and senior team coach Alexander Gorshkov, which were due to expire in the summer. Amkar's new head coach became Stanislav Cherchesov, who had previously been working with Terek Grozny. He was appointed on a two-year contract and was accompanied by the new senior team coach Miroslav Romaschenko, goalkeeper coach Gintaras Staučė team doctor Eduard Tsgoev, all of whom had been at Terek.

On 13 June 2018, the club announced that the Russian Football Union had recalled their 2018–19 season license, making them ineligible for the Russian Premier League or Russian Football National League. On 18 June 2018, club president Gennadi Shilov announced that the club would not register for the third-tier Russian Professional Football League and would be dissolved. FC Zvezda Perm was reestablished during the offseason and entered the PFL for the 2018–19 season.

=== Re-establishment and return to Division A ===
In August 2020 Amkar was reestablished to participate in the Amateur league under the sponsorship of the local government. After the end of 2020 season of Russian Amateur Football League, the head of Perm Krai says Amkar will apply for Professional Licence to play in Russian Professional Football League. The club was successfully licensed for the 2021–22 season.

Following the club's re-establishment, FC Amkar Perm was founded as a new legal entity on 5 April 2021. The club applied to the Russian Football Union for participation in the Professional Football League on 30 April 2021 and was accepted into FNL-2 on 20 May 2021.

In its first professional season after the revival, Amkar finished fourth in FNL-2 Group 4 in 2021–22. The following season, the club finished third in Second League Group 4. After the reform of the Russian Second League in 2023, Amkar played in Division A, Silver Group, but finished eighth and returned to Division B.

In 2024, Amkar finished second in Division B, Group 4. In 2025, after a season that included several managerial changes, the club won Division B, Group 4 and earned promotion back to Division A, Silver Group.

== Current squad ==
As of 11 September 2026 Note: Flags indicate national team as defined under FIFA eligibility rules; some limited exceptions apply. Players may hold more than one non-FIFA nationality.

No.	Pos.	Nation	Player
3	DF	RUS	Maksim Smolnikov
4	DF	RUS	Emil Gallyamov
5	DF	RUS	Georgy Sanakoyev
6	MF	RUS	Lev Tolkachyov
7	FW	RUS	Yevgeni Tyukalov
8	MF	RUS	Aleks Matsukatov
9	FW	RUS	Daniil Agureyev
10	FW	RUS	Dmitry Usov
11	MF	RUS	Vladislav Ignatenko
13	GK	RUS	Vladislav Dolzhenko
14	MF	RUS	Denis Chushyalov
15	DF	RUS	Kirill Sarayev
17	DF	RUS	Mikhail Malozemov (on loan from Nizhny Novgorod)
19	MF	RUS	Kirill Popov
21	MF	RUS	Nikita Ustinov

No.	Pos.	Nation	Player
23	MF	RUS	Denis Mikhaylov
28	DF	RUS	Grigory Zhilkin
31	MF	RUS	Kirill Burykin
45	DF	RUS	Andrei Pridyuk
55	FW	RUS	Vyacheslav Shibanov
57	GK	RUS	Yegor Trifonov
73	GK	RUS	Denis Yeremeyev (on loan from Volga Ulyanovsk)
77	MF	RUS	Yelisey Snegiryov
78	DF	RUS	Dmitry Kumsarov
81	DF	RUS	Ivan Lezin
88	MF	RUS	Maksim Novikov
89	MF	RUS	Nikita Khvat
92	DF	RUS	Aleksa Stanisavljevic
97	MF	RUS	Nikita Goldobin

== Russian Championship and Cup results ==
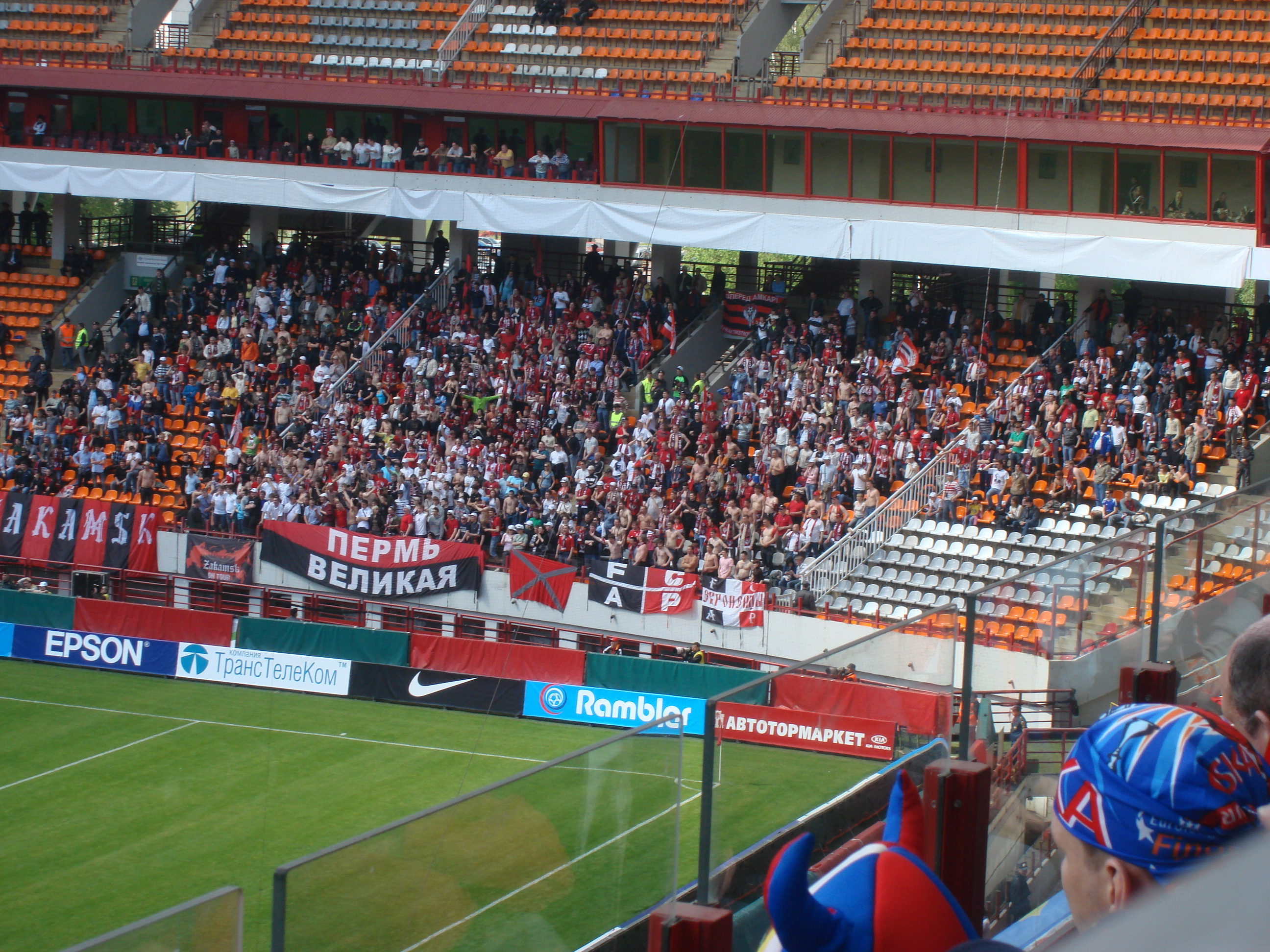
Amkar fans

Year	League	Place	Pl.	W	D	L	GS	GA	Pts.	Cup
1995	Third League	2	26	17	5	4	50	15	56	n/a
1996	Second League	3	42	28	9	5	86	31	93	n/a
1997	Second League	2	40	24	11	5	69	21	83	1/64
1998	Second League	1	37	34	2	1	100	12	104	1/64
1999	First Division	6	42	20	10	12	65	49	70	1/8
2000	First Division	6	38	17	9	12	53	38	60	1/16
2001	First Division	4	34	16	8	10	46	29	56	1/4
2002	First Division	5	34	15	9	10	45	31	54	1/2
2003	First Division	1	42	25	12	5	50	20	87	1/16
2004	Premier League	11	30	6	12	12	27	42	30	1/16
2005	Premier League	12	30	7	12	11	25	36	33	1/2
2006	Premier League	13	30	8	11	11	22	36	35	1/8
2007	Premier League	8	30	10	11	9	30	27	41	1/8
2008	Premier League	4	30	14	9	7	31	22	51	final
2009	Premier League	13	30	8	9	13	27	37	33	1/8
2010	Premier League	14	30	8	6	16	24	35	30	1/2
2010/11	no competition; because of format change									1/8
2011–12	Premier League	10	44	14	13	17	40	51	55	1/8
2012–13	Premier League	11	30	7	8	15	34	51	29	1/16
2013–14	Premier League	10	30	9	11	10	36	37	38	1/16
2014–15	Premier League	11	30	8	8	14	25	42	32	1/32
2015–16	Premier League	11	30	7	10	13	22	33	31	1/2
2016–17	Premier League	10	30	8	11	11	25	29	35	1/8
2017–18	Premier League	13	30	9	8	13	20	30	35	1/4
2018–2019	dissolved									
2020	Third League, Ural and Western Siberia zone	8	13	4	3	6	20	27	15	n/a
2021–22	FNL 2, Group 4	4	28	16	4	8	43	28	52	1/256
2022–23	Russian Second League, Group 4	3	27	14	5	8	43	31	47	2nd round, Regions Path
2023–24	Russian Second League, Division A, Silver Group	8	18	6	6	6	19	17	24	5th round, Regions Path
2024	Russian Second League, Division B, Group 4	2	26	16	7	3	35	15	55	6th round, Regions Path
2025	Russian Second League, Division B, Group 4	1	26	20	3	3	60	19	63	2nd round, Regions Path

== In Europe ==
Amkar participated in European football only once. Having finished fourth in the 2008 Russian Championship, the club earned the right to play in the Europa League. Amkar lost the first match to the English club Fulham 1–3, and although they won the second match 1–0, the team was eliminated on aggregate and Fulham progressed, eventually reaching the final.

As of match played 27 August 2009

Competition	Pld	W	D	L	GF	GA	GD
UEFA Europa League	2	1	0	1	2	3	−1
Total	2	1	0	1	2	3	–1

Season	Competition	Round	Opponent	Home	Away	Aggregate
2009–10	UEFA Europa League	POR	(England) Fulham	1–0	1–3	2–3

== Achievements ==
=== Domestic competitions ===
- Russian Cup
  - Runners-up (1): 2008
- Russian National Football League
  - Winners (1): 2003
- Russian Second League
  - Winners: 1998, 2025
  - Runners-up: 1997, 2024

== Sponsors ==
- Mineral fertilizers 1996–2007
- Lukoil 2007–2012
- Uralkali 2013
- Bank of Moscow 2013–2018
- Government of Perm Krai 2020–

== Records ==
=== Club records ===
- Biggest victory – 8–1 against Magnitogorsk in 1995.
- Biggest defeat – 0–6 against Spartak Moscow in 2004.
- Biggest victories in Premier League: Alania Vladikavkaz 5–1 (home, 2013); Dynamo Moscow 4–1 (home, 2005); Krylia Sovetov Samara 4–1 (home, 2007); Khimki 3–0 (away, 2008); Volga Nizhny Novgorod 4–1 (home, 2012)
- Most appearances in Premier League – Zahari Sirakov – 233 matches.
- Youngest player – Konstantin Zyryanov – 17 years 217 days, 10 May 1995, KAMAZ-2 Naberezhnye Chelny – Amkar 1–2.
- Oldest player – Sergei Chebanov – 40 years 207 days, 7 November 1999, Rubin Kazan – Amkar 0–0.

=== Russian record holders from Amkar ===
Club stalwarts
Player	Games
1 Aleksei Popov	424
2 Konstantin Paramonov	337
3 Zahari Sirakov	278
4 Georgi Peev	234
5 Sergei Volkov	215
6 Dmitri Belorukov	197
7 Ivan Cherenchikov	190
8 Yevgeni Yarkov	190
9 Aleksandr Galeutdinov	175
10 Igor Bakhtin	171
10 Konstantin Zyryanov	171
12 Oleg Fomenko	170
13 Vitali Grishin	168
14 Igor Uralyov	157
15 Stanislav Krasulin	154
16 Rustem Khuzin	152
17 Sergei Chebanov	146
18 Martin Kushev	134
19 Vyacheslav Donyi	128
20 Mitar Novaković	126
21 Petar Zanev	126

Leading goalscorers
Player	Goals
1 Konstantin Paramonov	170
2 Konstantin Zyryanov	48
3 Georgi Peev	41
4 Martin Kushev	36
5 Aleksandr Galeutdinov	29
6 Lev Matveyev	21
7 Sergei Chebanov	20
7 Sergei Volkov	20
9 Sergei Rybakov	18
10 Yuri Khairulin	18
11 Yevgeni Yarkov	16
12 Vadim Shpitalniy	14
13 Dmitri Belorukov	13
14 Igor Bakhtin	13
15 Aleksandr Shutov	13
16 Arslon Talipov	13
17 Aleksandr Katasonov	13
18 Airat Akhmetgaliev	11
19 Vitali Grishin	11
20 Aleksei Filippov	10
20 Nikita Burmistrov	10

== Managerial history ==
- 1993–94: (Russia) Viktor Zasulsky
- 1995–06: (Russia) Sergei Oborin (1 January 1995 – 31 December 2006)
- 2006: (Russia) Igor Uralyov (acting)
- 2006–07: (Tajikistan) Rashid Rakhimov (4 September 2006 – 31 December 2007)
- 2008: (Montenegro) Miodrag Božović (1 January 2008 – 31 December 2008)
- 2009: (Bulgaria) Dimitar Dimitrov (1 January 2009 – 1 September 2009)
- 2009–11: (Tajikistan) Rashid Rakhimov (5 September 2009 – 28 September 2011)
- 2011–12: (Montenegro) Miodrag Božović (29 September 2011 – 11 June 2012)
- 2012–13: (Ukraine) Nikolai Trubachov
- 2012–13: (Russia) Rustem Khuzin (interim) (11 June 2012 – 16 January 2013)
- 2013: (Russia) Rustem Khuzin (17 January 2013 – 30 June 2013)
- 2013–14: (Russia) Stanislav Cherchesov (1 July 2013 – 9 April 2014)
- 2014: (Russia) Konstantin Paramonov (interim) (10 April 2014 – 16 June 2014)
- 2014: (Serbia) Slavoljub Muslin (17 June 2014 – 9 December 2014)
- 2014–2018: (Russia) Gadzhi Gadzhiyev (30 December 2014 – 2 March 2018)
- 2018: (Russia) Vadim Evseev (interim) (2 March 2018 – 13 June 2018)
- 2020–2021: (Russia) Erik Ashurbekov (7 August 2020 – 1 June 2021)
- 2021–2023: (Russia) Rustem Khuzin (1 July 2021 – 5 April 2023)
- 2023: (Russia) Ivan Cherenchikov (5 April 2023 – 15 November 2023)
- 2024–2025: (Russia) Andrey Blazhko (12 January 2024 – 13 July 2025)
- 2025: (Belarus) Aleksandr Kulchiy (14 July 2025 – 9 September 2025)
- 2025–: (Russia) Yaroslav Mochalov (9 September 2025 – present; acting until 1 December 2025)

== Captains ==
- 1993–1994 (Russia) Vyacheslav Ogleznev
- 1995–1998 (Russia) Sergei Chebanov
- 1999–2000 (Russia) Konstantin Paramonov
- 2001–2004 (Russia) Rustem Khuzin
- 2005–2006 (Russia) Konstantin Paramonov
- 2007–2008 (Russia) Aleksei Popov
- 2008–2010 (Bulgaria) Martin Kushev
- 2011–2016 (Russia) Dmitri Belorukov
- 2016–2018 (Bulgaria) Petar Zanev

== Amkar players in International competitions ==
Tournament	Participant
Euro 2008	Vladimir Gabulov
2018 FIFA World Cup	Brian Idowu

== See also ==
- Zvezda 2005 Perm
- Oktan (football club)
- FC Amkar Perm in Europe
