= 2016–17 FC Amkar Perm season =

Amkar Perm
2015–16 season
- Chairman: Gennady Shilov
- Manager: Gadzhi Gadzhiyev
- Stadium: Zvezda Stadium
- Russian Premier League: 10th
- Russian Cup: Round of 16 vs Ural Yekaterinburg
- Top goalscorer: League: Darko Bodul (5); All: Darko Bodul (5)
Home colours	Away colours

The 2016–17 Amkar Perm season was their 13th season in the Russian Premier League, the highest tier of association football in Russia, following promotion during the 2003 season. They will participate in the Russian Premier League and Russian Cup.

== Squad ==
As of 13 March 2017

Note: Flags indicate national team as defined under FIFA eligibility rules; some limited exceptions apply. Players may hold more than one non-FIFA nationality.

No.	Pos.	Nation	Player
2	DF	SRB	Aleksandar Miljković
3	DF	BUL	Petar Zanev (Captain)
4	DF	RUS	Nikolai Zaytsev
5	MF	POL	Janusz Gol
6	DF	GUI	Sékou Condé
7	FW	UKR	Anton Shynder
8	MF	NGR	Fegor Ogude
9	FW	AUT	Darko Bodul
10	MF	RUS	Alikhan Shavayev
13	MF	RUS	Roland Gigolayev
15	GK	RUS	Dmitri Khomich
16	MF	BLR	Syarhey Balanovich

No.	Pos.	Nation	Player
17	FW	RUS	Aleksei Gasilin
19	DF	RUS	Brian Idowu
20	MF	RUS	Pavel Komolov
23	DF	RUS	Ivan Cherenchikov (Vice-captain)
25	MF	RUS	David Khurtsidze
27	MF	RUS	Mikhail Kostyukov
28	FW	RUS	Stanislav Prokofyev
33	MF	SRB	Branko Jovičić
77	FW	RUS	Aleksandr Salugin
95	GK	RUS	Denis Vambolt
98	GK	RUS	Aleksandr Budakov
99	FW	UKR	Oleh Mishchenko

=== Out on loan ===
Note: Flags indicate national team as defined under FIFA eligibility rules; some limited exceptions apply. Players may hold more than one non-FIFA nationality.

No.	Pos.	Nation	Player
—	MF	RUS	David Dzakhov (on loan to Shinnik Yaroslavl)

=== Youth squad ===
Note: Flags indicate national team as defined under FIFA eligibility rules; some limited exceptions apply. Players may hold more than one non-FIFA nationality.

No.	Pos.	Nation	Player
29	DF	RUS	Rinat Guseynov
34	DF	RUS	Mikhail Kondrashov
35	DF	RUS	Aleksandr Mosunov
36	MF	RUS	Aleksandr Pantsyrev
39	DF	RUS	Rustam Vazitdinov
41	GK	RUS	Roman Pshukov
44	MF	RUS	Viktor Urensky
46	MF	RUS	Georgi Yenev
47	FW	RUS	Maksim Zhukovsky
51	DF	RUS	Nikita Romaschenko
59	MF	RUS	Yevgeni Paramonov
63	GK	RUS	Daniil Arzhevitin

No.	Pos.	Nation	Player
68	MF	RUS	Timofey Kraev
70	FW	RUS	Anton Googe
71	GK	RUS	Anatoli Krasilnikov
72	FW	RUS	Aleksandr Melekhov
73	MF	RUS	Nikolai Smetskoy
74	DF	RUS	Gleb Burkov
78	MF	RUS	Artyom Filippov
80	MF	RUS	Andrei Trunin
92	DF	RUS	Danil Smirnov
96	MF	RUS	Vadim Chukhlantsev
97	DF	RUS	Khavazh Aushev

== Transfers ==
=== Summer ===
In: Note: Flags indicate national team as defined under FIFA eligibility rules; some limited exceptions apply. Players may hold more than one non-FIFA nationality.

No.	Pos.	Nation	Player
2	DF	SRB	Aleksandar Miljković (from (Croatia) RNK Split)
6	DF	GUI	Sékou Condé (from (Ukraine) Olimpik Donetsk)
7	FW	UKR	Anton Shynder (from (Ukraine) Shakhtar Donetsk)
9	FW	AUT	Darko Bodul (from (Scotland) Dundee United)
27	MF	RUS	Mikhail Kostyukov (from (Russia) Volga Nizhny Novgorod)
28	FW	RUS	Stanislav Prokofyev (from (Russia) SKA-Khabarovsk)
44	MF	RUS	Viktor Urensky
47	FW	RUS	Maksim Zhukovsky
92	DF	RUS	Danil Smirnov
97	DF	RUS	Khavazh Aushev (from (Russia) Angusht Nazran)
98	GK	RUS	Aleksandr Budakov (from (Belarus) Isloch Minsk Raion)

Out: Note: Flags indicate national team as defined under FIFA eligibility rules; some limited exceptions apply. Players may hold more than one non-FIFA nationality.

No.	Pos.	Nation	Player
1	GK	RUS	Roman Gerus (to (Russia) Arsenal Tula)
7	MF	BUL	Georgi Peev (retired)
9	FW	RUS	Aleksandr Prudnikov (to (Russia) Orenburg)
10	FW	NGR	Bright Dike (released)
17	MF	RUS	David Dzakhov (on loan to (Russia) Shinnik Yaroslavl)
18	FW	RUS	Aleksei Kurzenyov
21	DF	RUS	Dmitri Belorukov (to (Russia) Dynamo Moscow)
36	MF	RUS	Aleksandr Pantsyrev
37	DF	RUS	Ilya Pushkaryov
41	GK	RUS	Vladimir Otmakhov
42	MF	RUS	Vsevolod Kozhin
45	DF	RUS	Andrei Pridyuk (to (Russia) Chayka Peschanokopskoye)
47	MF	RUS	Daniil Frentsel
49	MF	RUS	Igor Paramonov
55	DF	RUS	Daniil Petrov
58	GK	RUS	Ivan Srednyakov
60	FW	RUS	Andrey Anfyorov
67	MF	RUS	Roman Bulak
79	FW	RUS	Bodiy Borchashvili
91	DF	UKR	Bohdan Butko (end of loan from (Ukraine) Shakhtar Donetsk)
98	MF	RUS	Igor Murashov (to (Russia) Zenit-Izhevsk)
99	FW	UKR	Oleh Mishchenko (on loan to (Ukraine) Illichivets Mariupol)
—	MF	RUS	Vasili Aleynikov (to (Russia) Pskov-747, previously on loan)
—	MF	RUS	Ivan Belikov (to (Russia) Afips Afipsky, previously on loan to (Russia) Lokomotiv Liski)

=== Winter ===
In: Note: Flags indicate national team as defined under FIFA eligibility rules; some limited exceptions apply. Players may hold more than one non-FIFA nationality.

No.	Pos.	Nation	Player
17	FW	RUS	Aleksei Gasilin (from (Russia) Zenit St. Petersburg)
37	DF	RUS	Nikolai Tarasov
40	MF	RUS	Vladislav Razdelkin (from (Russia) Spartak Moscow)
41	GK	RUS	Roman Pshukov
94	DF	RUS	Aleksandr Bushmin (from (Lithuania) Atlantas)
95	GK	RUS	Denis Vambolt (from (Russia) Baltika Kaliningrad)
99	FW	UKR	Oleh Mishchenko (loan return from (Ukraine) Illichivets Mariupol)

Out: Note: Flags indicate national team as defined under FIFA eligibility rules; some limited exceptions apply. Players may hold more than one non-FIFA nationality.

No.	Pos.	Nation	Player
11	FW	NOR	Chuma Anene (to (Kazakhstan) Kairat)
14	DF	RUS	Georgi Dzhikiya (to (Russia) Spartak Moscow)
57	GK	RUS	Aleksandr Selikhov (to (Russia) Spartak Moscow)
—	DF	ARM	Robert Arzumanyan (released, previously on loan to (Kazakhstan) Shakhter Karagandy)
—	DF	RUS	Soslan Takazov (on loan to (Russia) Volgar Astrakhan, previously on loan to (Russia) Tyumen)

== Competitions ==
=== Russian Premier League ===
==== Results by round ====
Round	1	2	3	4	5	6	7	8	9	10	11	12	13	14	15	16	17	18	19	20	21	22	23	24	25	26	27	28	29	30
Ground	A	H	A	H	A	H	A	H	A	H	A	H	A	A	H	A	H	A	H	A	H	A	H	A	H	A	H	H	A	H
Result	D	W	D	W	L	W	W	D	D	D	L	W	D	L	W	L	W	L	W	L	D	D	D	D	L	L	L	L	D	L
Position	10	5	4	2	5	4	4	4	5	4	7	6	6	7	7	7	6	8	6	6	6	7	8	7	8	9	10	10	10	10

Updated to match(es) played on 21 May 2017. Source: See results
A = Away; H = Home; W = Win; D = Draw; L = Loss

==== Matches ====
1 August 2016 1	Rubin Kazan	0 – 0	Amkar Perm	Kazan
21:30 YEKT (UTC+5)	Kanunnikov (yellow card) 14' (yellow-red card) 35'; Nabiullin (yellow card) 45+1'	Summary	Anene (yellow card) 12'; Shynder (yellow card) 69'; Salugin (yellow card) 90+3'	Stadium: Central Stadium; Attendance: 12,178; Referee: Mikhail Vilkov

7 August 2016 2	Amkar Perm	2 – 0	Anzhi Makhachkala	Perm
17:30 YEKT (UTC+5)	Anene 31'; Gol (yellow card) 57'; Zaytsev 88' (yellow card) 89'	Summary	Zhirov (yellow card) 17' (yellow-red card) 64'; Lazić (yellow card) 34'; Musalov (yellow card) 81'	Stadium: Zvezda Stadium; Attendance: 8,800; Referee: Vladislav Bezborodov

15 August 2016 3	Orenburg	0 – 0	Amkar Perm	Orenburg
19:30 YEKT (UTC+5)	Afonin (yellow card) 26'; Pomerko (yellow card) 59'; Sanaya (yellow card) 78'	Summary	Shynder (yellow card) 33'; Salugin (yellow card) 73'; Idowu (yellow card) 90+2'	Stadium: Gazovik Stadium; Attendance: 5,083; Referee: Aleksey Eskov

21 August 2016 4	Amkar Perm	1 – 0	Ural Yekaterinburg	Perm
17:30 YEKT (UTC+5)	Bodul 63'	Summary		Stadium: Zvezda Stadium; Attendance: 7,900; Referee: Alexey Nikolaev

27 August 2016 5	Zenit St.Petersburg	3 – 0	Amkar Perm	Saint Petersburg
20:00 YEKT (UTC+5)	Giuliano 22', 32'; Criscito 89'	Summary		Stadium: Petrovsky Stadium; Attendance: 17,864; Referee: Vladimir Seldyakov

10 September 2016 6	Amkar Perm	1 – 0	Tom Tomsk	Perm
17:30 YEKT (UTC+5)	Idowu (yellow card) 42'; Salugin 47'; Bodul (yellow card) 51'	Summary	Vranješ (yellow card) 53'	Stadium: Zvezda Stadium; Attendance: 6,500; Referee: Evgeny Turbin

17 September 2016 7	Terek Grozny	1 – 3	Amkar Perm	Grozny
21:00 YEKT (UTC+5)	Rodolfo 9' (yellow card) 90+1'; Píriz (yellow card) 34'; Sadayev (yellow card) 74'	Summary	Miljković 26'; Gol (yellow card) 31' (goal) 74' (pen.); Dzhikiya (yellow card) 49'; Zaytsev 51'; Kostyukov (yellow card) 90+1'; Bodul (yellow card) 90+3'	Stadium: Akhmat-Arena; Attendance: 14,735; Referee: Alexey Nikolaev

26 September 2016 8	Amkar Perm	0 – 0	Krylia Sovetov	Perm
19:00 YEKT (UTC+5)	Dzhikiya (yellow card) 63'	Summary	Mbakogu (yellow card) 9'	Stadium: Zvezda Stadium; Attendance: 8,180; Referee: Aleksey Sukhoy

2 October 2016 9	Ufa	1 – 1	Amkar Perm	Ufa
16:00 YEKT (UTC+5)	Fatai 52'; Igboun (yellow card) 54'	Summary	Stotsky 75' (o.g.); Gol (yellow card) 90+3'	Stadium: Neftyanik Stadium; Attendance: 9,050; Referee: Sergey Lapochkin

15 October 2016 10	Amkar Perm	0 – 0	Lokomotiv Moscow	Perm
16:30 YEKT (UTC+5)	Idowu (yellow card) 73'	Summary	Barinov (yellow card) 21'; Kolomeytsev (yellow card) 52'; Denisov (yellow card) 82'	Stadium: Zvezda Stadium; Attendance: 7,760; Referee: Vladimir Moskalyov

23 October 2016 11	Krasnodar	1 – 0	Amkar Perm	Krasnodar
21:00 YEKT (UTC+5)	Gazinsky 45+2'	Summary	Zaytsev (yellow card) 49'	Stadium: Krasnodar Stadium; Attendance: 14,900; Referee: Kirill Levnikov

29 October 2016 12	Amkar Perm	1 – 0	Rostov	Perm
17:30 YEKT (UTC+5)	Kostyukov 44'; Condé (yellow card) 56'; Balanovich (yellow card) 62'	Summary	Ezatolahi (yellow card) 40'; Bayramyan (yellow card) 53'; Kireyev (yellow card) 75'	Stadium: Zvezda Stadium; Attendance: 5,150; Referee: Aleksei Matyunin

6 November 2016 13	CSKA Moscow	2 – 2	Amkar Perm	Moscow
21:00 YEKT (UTC+5)	Ignashevich 18' (pen.); Tošić 45+1'; Strandberg (yellow card) 57'; Wernbloom (yellow card) 64'	Summary	Dzhikiya 25'; Kostyukov 27'; Balanovich (yellow card) 63'; Gol (yellow card) 64'; Ogude (yellow card) 74' (yellow-red card) 90+2'	Stadium: Arena CSKA; Attendance: 7,200; Referee: Vladimir Seldyakov

20 November 2016 14	Spartak Moscow	1 – 0	Amkar Perm	Moscow
18:00 YEKT (UTC+5)	Maurício (yellow card) 69'; Glushakov 90+1'; Promes (yellow card) 90+4'	Summary	Balanovich (yellow card) 67'; Idowu (yellow card) 76'; Komolov (yellow card) 76'; Dzhikiya (yellow card) 90+3'; Miljković (yellow card) 90+5'	Stadium: Otkrytiye Arena; Attendance: 27,446; Referee: Sergey Lapochkin

26 November 2016 15	Amkar Perm	1 – 0	Arsenal Tula	Perm
13:30 YEKT (UTC+5)	Prokofyev 7'	Summary	Maksimov (yellow card) 58'; Burmistrov (yellow card) 65'; Steklov (yellow card) 90+4'	Stadium: Zvezda Stadium; Attendance: 4,150; Referee: Evgeny Turbin

1 December 2016 16	Anzhi Makhachkala	3 – 1	Amkar Perm	Kaspiysk
22:30 YEKT (UTC+5)	Budkivskyi 43', 65'; Boli 49' (pen.); Musalov (yellow card) 75'; Gadzhibekov (yellow card) 84'	Summary	Bodul 25'; Gol (yellow card) 50'; Gigolayev (yellow card) 66'	Stadium: Anzhi Arena; Attendance: 2,100; Referee: Sergey Karasev

5 December 2016 17	Amkar Perm	3 – 0	Orenburg	Perm
16:00 YEKT (UTC+5)	Žunić 21' (o.g.); Zaytsev (yellow card) 25'; Prokofyev (yellow card) 29'; Idowu 35'; Zanev (yellow card) 80'; Dzhikiya (yellow card) 89'; Gigolayev 90+3'	Summary	Koronov (yellow card) 31'; Malykh (yellow card) 84'	Stadium: Zvezda Stadium; Attendance: 4,250; Referee: Igor Fedotov

5 March 2017 18	Ural Yekaterinburg	1 – 0	Amkar Perm	Yekaterinburg
13:30 YEKT (UTC+5)	Bicfalvi 32'; Ilyin (yellow card) 36'; Zabolotny (yellow card) 90+2'	Summary	Condé (yellow card) 27'; Zaytsev (yellow card) 36'	Stadium: SKB-Bank Arena; Attendance: 4,570; Referee: Mikhail Vilkov

12 March 2016 19	Amkar Perm	1 – 0	Zenit St.Petersburg	Perm
13:30 YEKT (UTC+5)	Komolov (yellow card) 23'; Zanev (yellow card) 27'; Gigolayev 33'; Gasilin (yellow card) 34'; Khomich (yellow card) 60'; Gol (yellow card) 73'	Summary	Neto (yellow card) 60'; Criscito (yellow card) 77'	Stadium: Zvezda Stadium; Attendance: 12,200; Referee: Evgeny Turbin

18 March 2017 20	Tom Tomsk	1 – 0	Amkar Perm	Tomsk
13:30 YEKT (UTC+5)	Kuznetsov 24'; Osipov (yellow card) 35'; Pugin (yellow card) 37'; Popov (yellow card) 49'	Summary	Gol (yellow card) 46'; Condé (yellow card) 61'; Zaytsev (yellow card) 78'; Idowu (yellow card) 84'; Bodul (yellow card) 90+1'	Stadium: Trud Stadium; Attendance: 2,600; Referee: Timur Arslanbekov

2 April 2017 21	Amkar Perm	1 – 1	Terek Grozny	Perm
15:30 YEKT (UTC+5)	Gigolayev 9'	Summary	Roshi (yellow card) 18'; Mitrishev 31'; Utsiyev (yellow card) 69'	Stadium: Zvezda Stadium; Attendance: 6,300; Referee: Aleksei Matyunin

8 April 2017 22	Krylia Sovetov	2 – 2	Amkar Perm	Samara
16:00 YEKT (UTC+5)	Bruno 16'; Kornilenko 32'; Zinkov (yellow card) 58' (yellow-red card) 90+1'	Summary	Gol 8'; Zaytsev (yellow card) 27'; Zanev 30' (pen.); Ogude (yellow card) 55'	Stadium: Metallurg Stadium; Attendance: 6,430; Referee: Vitaly Meshkov

15 April 2017 23	Amkar Perm	1 – 1	Ufa	Perm
14:00 YEKT (UTC+5)	Bodul 89'	Summary	Gol 35' (o.g.); Alikin (yellow card) 41'; Belenov (yellow card) 87'; Nikitin (yellow card) 90+2'	Stadium: Zvezda Stadium; Attendance: 5,200; Referee: Vladimir Moskalyov

22 April 2017 24	Lokomotiv Moscow	3 – 3	Amkar Perm	Moscow
18:30 YEKT (UTC+5)	Miranchuk 42'; Tarasov 54' (yellow card) 71'; Fernandes 56' (pen.)	Summary	Idowu (yellow card) 20'; Bodul 22', 61' (pen.); Khomich (yellow card) 55'; Prokofyev 88'	Stadium: Lokomotiv Stadium; Attendance: 7,035; Referee: Sergey Ivanov

27 April 2017 25	Amkar Perm	0 – 2	Krasnodar	Perm
19:00 YEKT (UTC+5)	Gigolayev (yellow card) 81'	Summary	Smolov 63'; Wánderson 76'	Stadium: Zvezda Stadium; Attendance: 7,250; Referee: Aleksey Sukhoy

30 April 2017 26	Rostov	1 – 0	Amkar Perm	Rostov-on-Don
21:30 YEKT (UTC+5)	Bukharov 57'	Summary	Miljković (yellow card) 33'; Jovičić (red card) 54'; Idowu (yellow card) 58'	Stadium: Olimp-2; Attendance: 9,873; Referee: Sergey Lapochkin

6 May 2017 27	Amkar Perm	0 – 2	CSKA Moscow	Perm
16:00 YEKT (UTC+5)	Zaytsev (yellow card) 36'; Condé (yellow card) 65'; Salugin (yellow card) 90'	Summary	Chalov 60'; Natcho 65'	Stadium: Zvezda Stadium; Attendance: 7,100; Referee: Kirill Levnikov

13 May 2017 28	Amkar Perm	0 – 1	Spartak Moscow	Perm
16:30 YEKT (UTC+5)	Zanev (yellow card) 76'	Report	Samedov 50'	Stadium: Zvezda Stadium; Attendance: 12,300; Referee: Sergey Lapochkin

17 May 2017 29	Arsenal Tula	0 – 0	Amkar Perm	Tula
21:30 YEKT (UTC+5)	Grigalava (yellow card) 89'	Report	Miljković (yellow card) 72'; Kostyukov (yellow card) 77'	Stadium: Arsenal Stadium; Attendance: 8,100; Referee: Vladimir Moskalyov

21 May 2017 30	Amkar Perm	1 – 2	Rubin Kazan	Perm
17:00 YEKT (UTC+5)	Gigolayev (yellow card) 59'; Jovičić 69'; Prokofyev (yellow card) 90+4'	Report	Jonathas 24' (yellow card) 68'; Kanunnikov 35'; Song (yellow card) 66' (yellow-red card) 84'; Sánchez (yellow card) 71'	Stadium: Zvezda Stadium; Attendance: 4,300; Referee: Oleg Sokolov

==== League table ====
Pos	Team	Pld	W	D	L	GF	GA	GD	Pts	Qualification or relegation
8	Lokomotiv Moscow	30	10	12	8	39	27	+12	42	Qualification for the Europa League group stage (Note: Lokomotiv Moscow qualified for the Europa League group stage by winning the 2016–17 Russian Cup.)
9	Rubin Kazan	30	10	8	12	30	34	−4	38	
10	Amkar Perm	30	8	11	11	25	29	−4	35	
11	Ural Yekaterinburg	30	8	6	16	24	44	−20	30	
12	Anzhi Makhachkala	30	7	9	14	24	38	−14	30 (Note: Anzhi Makhachkala ahead of Orenburg on head-to-head points; Orenburg–Anzhi Makhachkala 0–0, Anzhi Makhachkala–Orenburg 1–0.)	

Source: Russian Premier League, Soccerway
Rules for classification: 1) Points; 2) Matches won; 3) Head-to-head points; 4) Head-to-head matches won; 5) Head-to-head goal difference; 6) Head-to-head goals scored; 7) Head-to-head away goals; 8) Goal difference; 9) Goals scored; 10) Away goals scored.

=== Russian Cup ===
21 September 2016 Round of 32	Volga Ulyanovsk	0 – 0 (a.e.t.) (3 – 4 p)	Amkar Perm	Ulyanovsk
19:00 YEKT (UTC+5)	Yefim Shanin (yellow card) 55'	Summary	Shavayev (yellow card) 101'	Stadium: Start Stadium; Attendance: 3,100; Referee: Timur Arslanbekov
	Penalties
	Yefim Shanin (penalty scored); Igor Bugayenko (penalty scored); Nagovitsin (penalty missed); Aleksei Tsygantsov (penalty scored); Khayrullov (penalty missed)		(penalty scored) Zanev; (penalty scored) Jovičić; (penalty scored) Shynder; (penalty scored) Gigolayev

26 October 2016 Round of 16	Amkar Perm	1 – 1 (a.e.t.) (2 – 4 p)	Ural Yekaterinburg	Perm
19:00 MSK (UTC+3)	Gigolayev 74'; Gol (yellow card) 77'; Condé (yellow card) 81'; Dzhikiya (yellow card) 86'; Zanev (yellow card) 90'; Jovičić (yellow card) 90+3'	Summary	Fontanello 38'; Dantsev (yellow card) 77'	Stadium: Zvezda Stadium; Attendance: 5,100; Referee: Roman Galimov
	Penalties
	Zanev (penalty scored); Gigolayev (penalty missed); Jovičić (penalty scored); Prokofyev (penalty missed)		(penalty scored) Chanturia; (penalty scored) Fontanello; (penalty scored) Podoksyonov; (penalty scored) Lungu

== Squad statistics ==
As of Match played 21 May 2017

=== Appearances and goals ===
No.	Pos	Nat	Player	Total		Premier League		Russian Cup	
No.	Pos	Nat	Player	Apps	Goals	Apps	Goals	Apps	Goals
2	DF	(Serbia) SRB	Aleksandar Miljković	25	1	23+2	1	0	0
3	DF	(Bulgaria) BUL	Petar Zanev	31	1	29	1	2	0
4	DF	(Russia) RUS	Nikolai Zaytsev	29	2	23+4	2	1+1	0
5	MF	(Poland) POL	Janusz Gol	27	2	26	2	1	0
6	DF	(Guinea) GUI	Sékou Condé	18	0	16	0	2	0
7	FW	(Ukraine) UKR	Anton Shynder	10	0	4+4	0	2	0
8	MF	(Nigeria) NGR	Fegor Ogude	18	0	17+1	0	0	0
9	FW	(Austria) AUT	Darko Bodul	25	5	22+2	5	0+1	0
10	MF	(Russia) RUS	Alikhan Shavayev	6	0	4+1	0	1	0
13	MF	(Russia) RUS	Roland Gigolayev	22	4	16+4	3	2	1
14	DF	(Russia) RUS	Georgi Dzhikiya	17	1	16	1	1	0
15	GK	(Russia) RUS	Dmitri Khomich	14	0	13	0	1	0
16	MF	(Belarus) BLR	Syarhey Balanovich	22	0	13+9	0	0	0
17	MF	(Russia) RUS	Aleksei Gasilin	13	0	6+7	0	0	0
19	DF	(Russia) RUS	Brian Idowu	28	1	25+1	1	2	0
20	MF	(Russia) RUS	Pavel Komolov	29	0	22+6	0	1	0
23	DF	(Russia) RUS	Ivan Cherenchikov	2	0	1	0	0+1	0
25	MF	(Russia) RUS	David Khurtsidze	4	0	1+3	0	0	0
27	MF	(Russia) RUS	Mikhail Kostyukov	21	2	10+9	2	1+1	0
28	FW	(Russia) RUS	Stanislav Prokofyev	15	2	8+5	2	0+2	0
33	MF	(Serbia) SRB	Branko Jovičić	23	1	8+13	1	2	0
77	FW	(Russia) RUS	Aleksandr Salugin	18	1	13+5	1	0	0
Players away from the club on loan:
Players who appeared for Amkar Perm no longer at the club:
11	FW	(Norway) NOR	Chuma Anene	12	1	7+3	1	2	0
57	GK	(Russia) RUS	Aleksandr Selikhov	18	0	17	0	1	0

=== Goal scorers ===
Place	Position	Nation	Number	Name	Premier League	Russian Cup	Total
1	FW	(Austria)	9	Darko Bodul	5	0	5
2	MF	(Russia)	13	Roland Gigolayev	3	1	4
3	DF	(Russia)	4	Nikolai Zaytsev	2	0	2
3	MF	(Russia)	27	Mikhail Kostyukov	2	0	2
3	MF	(Russia)	5	Janusz Gol	2	0	2
3	FW	(Russia)	28	Stanislav Prokofyev	2	0	2
3				Own goal	2	0	2
8	MF	(Russia)	11	Chuma Anene	1	0	1
8	MF	(Russia)	14	Georgi Dzhikiya	1	0	1
8	DF	(Russia)	19	Brian Idowu	1	0	1
8	DF	(Serbia)	2	Aleksandar Miljković	1	0	1
8	FW	(Russia)	77	Aleksandr Salugin	1	0	1
8	DF	(Bulgaria)	3	Petar Zanev	1	0	1
8	MF	(Serbia)	33	Branko Jovičić	1	0	1
				TOTALS	25	1	26

=== Disciplinary record ===
Number	Nation	Position	Name	Premier League		Russian Cup		Total	
Number	Nation	Position	Name	Yellow card	Red card	Yellow card	Red card	Yellow card	Red card
2	(Serbia)	DF	Aleksandar Miljković	3	0	0	0	3	0
3	(Bulgaria)	DF	Petar Zanev	3	0	1	0	4	0
4	(Russia)	DF	Nikolai Zaytsev	7	0	0	0	7	0
5	(Poland)	MF	Janusz Gol	7	0	1	0	8	0
6	(Guinea)	DF	Sékou Condé	4	0	1	0	5	0
7	(Ukraine)	FW	Anton Shynder	2	0	0	0	2	0
8	(Nigeria)	MF	Fegor Ogude	3	1	0	0	3	1
9	(Austria)	FW	Darko Bodul	3	0	0	0	3	0
10	(Russia)	MF	Alikhan Shavayev	0	0	1	0	1	0
11	(Norway)	FW	Chuma Anene	1	0	0	0	1	0
13	(Russia)	MF	Roland Gigolayev	3	0	0	0	3	0
14	(Russia)	DF	Georgi Dzhikiya	4	0	1	0	5	0
15	(Russia)	GK	Dmitri Khomich	2	0	0	0	2	0
16	(Belarus)	MF	Syarhey Balanovich	3	0	0	0	3	0
17	(Russia)	MF	Aleksei Gasilin	1	0	0	0	1	0
19	(Russia)	DF	Brian Idowu	7	0	0	0	7	0
20	(Russia)	MF	Pavel Komolov	2	0	0	0	2	0
27	(Russia)	MF	Mikhail Kostyukov	2	0	0	0	2	0
28	(Russia)	FW	Stanislav Prokofyev	2	0	0	0	2	0
33	(Serbia)	MF	Branko Jovičić	0	1	1	0	1	1
77	(Russia)	FW	Aleksandr Salugin	3	0	0	0	3	0
			TOTALS	62	2	6	0	68	2
