= 2015–16 FC Amkar Perm season =

Amkar Perm
2015–16 season
- Chairman: Gennady Shilov
- Manager: Gadzhi Gadzhiyev
- Stadium: Zvezda Stadium
- Russian Premier League: 11th
- Russian Cup: Semifinal vs Zenit St.Petersburg
- Top goalscorer: League: Alikhan Shavayev (4); All: Alikhan Shavayev (5)
Home colours	Away colours

The 2015–16 Amkar Perm season was their 12th season in the Russian Premier League, the highest tier of association football in Russia, following promotion during the 2003 season. They participated in the Russian Premier League, finishing 11th, whilst also reaching the Semifinals of the Russian Cup.

== Squad ==
As of 29 February 2016

Note: Flags indicate national team as defined under FIFA eligibility rules; some limited exceptions apply. Players may hold more than one non-FIFA nationality.

No.	Pos.	Nation	Player
1	GK	RUS	Roman Gerus
3	DF	BUL	Petar Zanev
4	DF	RUS	Nikolai Zaytsev
5	MF	POL	Janusz Gol
7	MF	BUL	Georgi Peev (vice-captain)
8	MF	NGR	Fegor Ogude
9	FW	RUS	Aleksandr Prudnikov
10	FW	NGR	Bright Dike
11	FW	NOR	Chuma Anene
13	MF	RUS	Roland Gigolayev
14	DF	RUS	Georgi Dzhikiya
15	GK	RUS	Dmitri Khomich
16	MF	BLR	Syarhey Balanovich
17	MF	RUS	David Dzakhov
18	FW	RUS	Aleksei Kurzenyov

No.	Pos.	Nation	Player
19	DF	RUS	Brian Idowu
20	MF	RUS	Pavel Komolov
21	DF	RUS	Dmitri Belorukov (captain)
22	MF	RUS	Alikhan Shavayev
23	DF	RUS	Ivan Cherenchikov
33	MF	SRB	Branko Jovičić
36	MF	RUS	Aleksandr Pantsyrev
45	DF	RUS	Andrei Pridyuk
57	GK	RUS	Aleksandr Selikhov
77	FW	RUS	Aleksandr Salugin
78	MF	RUS	Artyom Filippov
80	MF	RUS	Andrei Trunin
91	DF	UKR	Bohdan Butko
99	MF	UKR	Oleh Mishchenko
—	MF	RUS	David Khurtsidze

=== Out on loan ===
Note: Flags indicate national team as defined under FIFA eligibility rules; some limited exceptions apply. Players may hold more than one non-FIFA nationality.

No.	Pos.	Nation	Player
50	DF	ARM	Robert Arzumanyan (at Shakhter Karagandy)

=== Youth squad ===
Note: Flags indicate national team as defined under FIFA eligibility rules; some limited exceptions apply. Players may hold more than one non-FIFA nationality.

No.	Pos.	Nation	Player
29	DF	RUS	Rinat Guseynov
34	DF	RUS	Mikhail Kondrashov
35	DF	RUS	Aleksandr Mosunov
37	DF	RUS	Ilya Pushkaryov
39	DF	RUS	Rustam Vazitdinov
40	MF	RUS	Ivan Belikov
41	GK	RUS	Vladimir Otmakhov
42	MF	RUS	Vsevolod Kozhin
44	MF	RUS	Aleksei Orlov
46	MF	RUS	Georgi Yenev
47	MF	RUS	Daniil Frentsel
49	MF	RUS	Igor Paramonov
51	DF	RUS	Nikita Romaschenko
55	DF	RUS	Daniil Petrov

No.	Pos.	Nation	Player
58	GK	RUS	Ivan Srednyakov
59	MF	RUS	Yevgeni Paramonov
60	FW	RUS	Andrey Anfyorov
61	FW	RUS	Aleksandr Melekhov
63	GK	RUS	Daniil Arzhevitin
67	MF	RUS	Roman Bulak
68	MF	RUS	Timofey Kraev
70	FW	RUS	Anton Googe
71	GK	RUS	Anatoli Krasilnikov
73	MF	RUS	Nikolai Smetskoy
74	DF	RUS	Gleb Burkov
79	FW	RUS	Bodiy Borchashvili
96	MF	RUS	Vadim Chukhlantsev
98	MF	RUS	Igor Murashov

== Transfers ==
=== Summer ===
In: Note: Flags indicate national team as defined under FIFA eligibility rules; some limited exceptions apply. Players may hold more than one non-FIFA nationality.

No.	Pos.	Nation	Player
4	DF	RUS	Nikolai Zaytsev (from (Russia) Tosno)
11	FW	NOR	Chuma Anene (from (North Macedonia) Rabotnički)
14	DF	RUS	Georgi Dzhikiya (from (Russia) Khimik Dzerzhinsk)
20	MF	RUS	Pavel Komolov (from (Lithuania) Žalgiris Vilnius, previously on loan at (Poland) GKS Bełchatów)
33	MF	SRB	Branko Jovičić (from (Austria) LASK Linz, previously on loan)
34	DF	RUS	Mikhail Kondrashov
36	MF	RUS	Aleksandr Pantsyrev (end of loan to (Russia) Neftekhimik Nizhnekamsk)
37	DF	RUS	Ilya Pushkaryov
40	MF	RUS	Ivan Belikov
41	FW	RUS	Aleksandr Melekhov
42	MF	RUS	Vsevolod Kozhin
43	MF	NGR	Izunna Uzochukwu (from (Denmark) Midtjylland)
44	MF	RUS	Aleksei Orlov (free agent, with (Russia) Krasnodar until February 2015)
45	DF	RUS	Andrei Pridyuk (end of loan at (Russia) Tambov)
46	MF	RUS	Georgi Yenev
47	MF	RUS	Daniil Frentsel
51	DF	RUS	Nikita Romaschenko (from (Russia) Torpedo Moscow)
55	DF	RUS	Daniil Petrov
63	GK	RUS	Daniil Arzhevitin
67	MF	RUS	Roman Bulak
68	MF	RUS	Timofey Krayev
70	FW	RUS	Anton Googe (own academy, April 2015)
73	MF	RUS	Nikolai Smetskoy
74	DF	RUS	Gleb Burkov
77	FW	RUS	Aleksandr Salugin (from (Russia) Torpedo Moscow)

Out: Note: Flags indicate national team as defined under FIFA eligibility rules; some limited exceptions apply. Players may hold more than one non-FIFA nationality.

No.	Pos.	Nation	Player
4	MF	RUS	Maksim Batov (to (Russia) Rubin Kazan)
6	DF	RUS	Aleksei Nikitin (to (Russia) Ufa)
8	MF	RUS	Igor Kireyev (end of loan from (Russia) Rostov)
10	FW	MDA	Igor Picușceac (to (Moldova) Sheriff Tiraspol)
11	FW	MKD	Marko Simonovski (to (Croatia) RNK Split)
14	DF	BUL	Zahari Sirakov (retired)
17	MF	RUS	David Dzakhov
19	MF	RUS	Aleksandr Kolomeytsev (to (Russia) Lokomotiv Moscow)
26	FW	SVK	Martin Jakubko (to (Slovakia) MFK Ružomberok)
27	FW	RUS	Vladislav Shpitalny
30	DF	RUS	Soslan Takazov (to (Russia) Tyumen)
35	MF	RUS	Aykaz Zilabyan
38	MF	RUS	Vasili Aleynikov (on loan to (Russia) Pskov-747 Pskov)
40	DF	RUS	Vladimir Troshev
43	FW	RUS	Yevgeni Tyukalov (to (Portugal) Leiria)
44	DF	RUS	Nikita Permyakov
46	MF	RUS	Aleksandr Patrikeyev
51	DF	RUS	Dmitri Tyukalov
55	MF	RUS	Vladimir Pereverzev
61	FW	RUS	Nikita Goldobin
72	FW	RUS	Ivan Ivanchenko (to (Russia) Lada-Togliatti)
73	MF	RUS	Dmitri Opachev (to (Russia) Nosta Novotroitsk)
75	MF	RUS	Aleksei Serpokrylov (to (Russia) Yevpatoria)
77	DF	RUS	Rafsan Gasymov
78	FW	RUS	Pavel Novykh
88	FW	RUS	Pavel Solomatin (end of loan from (Russia) Dynamo Moscow)
92	MF	RUS	Valeri Kuznetsov (to (Russia) Ural Sverdlovsk Oblast)
—	DF	POL	Damian Zbozień (to (Poland) Zagłębie Lubin, previously on loan at (Poland) GKS Bełchatów)

=== Winter ===
In: Note: Flags indicate national team as defined under FIFA eligibility rules; some limited exceptions apply. Players may hold more than one non-FIFA nationality.

No.	Pos.	Nation	Player
10	FW	NGR	Bright Dike (from (Canada) Toronto)
13	MF	RUS	Roland Gigolayev (from (Poland) Ruch Chorzów)
17	MF	RUS	David Dzakhov (free agent)
78	MF	RUS	Artyom Filippov (from (Russia) Chertanovo Moscow)
80	MF	RUS	Andrei Trunin
99	MF	UKR	Oleh Mishchenko (from (Ukraine) Vorskla Poltava)
—	MF	RUS	David Khurtsidze (from (Russia) Torpedo Armavir, the contract starts in July)

Out: Note: Flags indicate national team as defined under FIFA eligibility rules; some limited exceptions apply. Players may hold more than one non-FIFA nationality.

No.	Pos.	Nation	Player
40	MF	RUS	Ivan Belikov (on loan to (Russia) Lokomotiv Liski)
43	MF	NGR	Izunna Uzochukwu (to (Denmark) OB)
44	MF	RUS	Aleksei Orlov
50	DF	ARM	Robert Arzumanyan (on loan to (Kazakhstan) Shakhter Karagandy)

== Competitions ==
=== Russian Premier League ===
==== Matches ====
20 July 2015 1	Amkar Perm	0 – 1	Krasnodar	Perm
19:00 YET (UTC+5)	Prudnikov (yellow card) 9' (yellow-red card) 13'	Summary	Gazinsky (yellow card) 13' (yellow-red card) 71'; Jędrzejczyk (yellow card) 22'; Mamayev (yellow card) 72'; Laborde (yellow card) 73'; Petrov 84'	Stadium: Zvezda Stadium; Attendance: 10,100; Referee: Aleksei Matyunin

26 July 2015 2	Rubin Kazan	0 – 2	Amkar Perm	Kazan
19:00 YET (UTC+5)	Nabiullin (yellow card) 14'; Kvirkvelia (yellow card) 16' (yellow-red card) 64'; Kuzmin (yellow card) 42'	Summary	Uzochukwu (yellow card) 25'; Jovičić (yellow card) 42'; Zanev (yellow card) 43'; Kvirkvelia 48' (o.g.); Ogude (yellow card) 54'; Cherenchikov (yellow card) 54'; Gerus (yellow card) 90+2'; Peev 90+3' (pen.)	Stadium: Central Stadium; Attendance: 6,178; Referee: Sergey Karasev

1 August 2015 3	Amkar Prem	1 – 0	Krylia Sovetov	Perm
14:00 MSK (UTC+3)	Belorukov 27'; Cherenchikov (yellow card) 65'; Dzhikiya (yellow card) 89'; Idowu (yellow card) 90+4'	Summary	Chochiyev (yellow card) 65'; Sadik (yellow card) 82'	Stadium: Zvezda Stadium; Attendance: 8,800; Referee: Sergey Kostevich

9 August 2015 4	CSKA Moscow	2 – 0	Amkar Perm	Khimki
15:30 YET (UTC+5)	Natcho 2' (pen.); Berezutski (yellow card) 32'; Tošić 41'	Report	Cherenchikov (yellow card) 1'; Uzochukwu (yellow card) 30'	Stadium: Arena Khimki; Attendance: 6,061; Referee: Igor Nizovtsev

14 August 2015 5	Amkar Perm	1 – 1	Anzhi Makhachkala	Perm
19:00 YET (UTC+5)	Zanev (yellow card) 23'; Ogude (yellow card) 26'; Gol 66'; Belorukov (yellow card) 75'; Balanovich (yellow card) 86'; Peev (yellow card) 90+4'	Summary	Yeshchenko (yellow card) 15'; Boli 64'; Maksimov (yellow card) 90+4'	Stadium: Zvezda Stadium; Attendance: 8,400; Referee: Igor Fedotov

22 August 2015 6	Amkar Prem	1 – 3	Spartak Moscow	Perm
19:00 YET (UTC+5)	Belorukov (yellow card) 59'; Gol 78'	Summary	Movsisyan 20'; Shirokov (yellow card) 32'; Promes 66', 71'	Stadium: Zvezda Stadium; Attendance: 14,800; Referee: Kulikov

28 August 2015 7	Rostov	1 – 0	Amkar Perm	Rostov-on-Don
22:00 YET (UTC+5)	Margasov (yellow card) 46'; Kalachou (yellow card) 59'; Novoseltsev (yellow card) 60'; Azmoun (yellow card) 60'; Noboa 65'	Summary	Peev (yellow card) 52'; Ogude (red card) 58'; Belorukov (yellow card) 60'; Zanev (yellow card) 65'; Salugin (yellow card) 84'; Cherenchikov (yellow card) 87'; Komolov (yellow card) 90+3'	Stadium: Olimp-2; Attendance: 12,987; Referee: Aleksei Matyunin

12 September 2015 8	Amkar Prem	1 – 1	Kuban Krasnodar	Perm
18:30 YET (UTC+5)	Shavayev 58'	Summary	Melgarejo 42'; Khubulov (yellow card) 90+3'	Stadium: Zvezda Stadium; Attendance: 8,275; Referee: Igor Nizovtsev

20 September 2015 9	Zenit St.Petersburg	1 – 1	Amkar Perm	Saint Petersburg
19:00 YET (UTC+5)	Dzyuba 10' (yellow card) 52'	Summary	Belorukov (yellow card) 58'; Anene 66'; Shavayev (yellow card) 89'; Selikhov (yellow card) 90+3'	Stadium: Petrovsky Stadium; Attendance: 16,480; Referee: Alexey Nikolaev

28 September 2015 10	Amkar Prem	2 – 1	Mordovia Saransk	Perm
18:30 YET (UTC+5)	Shavayev 55' (yellow card) 82'; Peev 67' (pen.); Prudnikov (yellow card) 85'	Summary	R.Mukhametshin 24'; Dudiyev (yellow card) 28'; Phibel (yellow card) 39'	Stadium: Zvezda Stadium; Attendance: 8,150; Referee: Vladislav Bezborodov

4 October 2015 11	Lokomotiv Moscow	3 – 0	Amkar Perm	Moscow
21:00 YET (UTC+5)	Niasse (yellow card) 17'; Kolomeytsev 28'; Samedov 78'; Miranchuk 86'	Summary	Ogude (yellow card) 15'; Belorukov (yellow card) 78'	Stadium: Lokomotiv Stadium; Attendance: 7,504; Referee: Sergey Lapochkin

17 October 2015 12	Amkar Perm	1 – 1	Dynamo Moscow	Perm
18:30 YET (UTC+5)	Cherenchikov (yellow card) 32'; Ogude (yellow card) 39'; Dzhikiya (yellow card) 52'; Prudnikov 83'	Summary	Zhivoglyadov (yellow card) 57'; Kokorin 90' (pen.)	Stadium: Zvezda Stadium; Attendance: 5,340; Referee: Kirill Levnikov

24 October 2015 13	Ural	3 – 1	Amkar Perm	Yekaterinburg
14:00 YET (UTC+5)	Fontanello 6'; Sapeta 65'; Dantsev (yellow card) 79'; Manucharyan 90+3' (pen.)	Summary	Prudnikov (yellow card) 44'; Salugin 61'	Stadium: SKB-Bank Arena; Attendance: 3,698; Referee: Alexey Nikolaev

2 November 2015 14	Amkar Perm	1 – 0	Terek Grozny	Perm
17:00 MSK (UTC+3)	Zanev (yellow card) 16'; Utsiyev 51' (o.g.); Dzhikiya (yellow card) 82'	Summary	Rodolfo (yellow card) 2'; Ivanov (yellow card) 43'	Stadium: Zvezda Stadium; Attendance: 4,225; Referee: Aleksey Eskov

7 November 2015 15	Ufa	2 – 1	Amkar Perm	Ufa
18:15 YEKT (UTC+5)	Igboun 47'; Krotov 88'	Summary	Ogude (yellow card) 59'; Salugin 68'	Stadium: Neftyanik Stadium; Attendance: 5,250; Referee: Sergey Lapochkin

21 November 2015 16	Amkar Perm	1 – 2	Rubin Kazan	Perm
14:00 YET (UTC+5)	Ogude (yellow card) 14'; Zanev (yellow card) 31'; Selikhov (yellow card) 45+2'; Shavayev 54'; Cherenchikov (yellow card) 63'	Summary	Dević 37' (pen.), 62'; Kuzmin (yellow card) 56'; Georgiev (yellow card) 61'	Stadium: Zvezda Stadium; Attendance: 2,350; Referee: Vladislav Bezborodov

28 November 2015 17	Krylia Sovetov	0 – 0	Amkar Perm	Samara
17:00 YET (UTC+5)	Taranov (yellow card) 20'	Summary	Zanev (yellow card) 22'; Dzhikiya (yellow card) 90+3'	Stadium: Metallurg Stadium; Attendance: 4,089; Referee: Aleksei Matyunin

3 December 2015 18	Amkar Perm	2 – 0	CSKA Moscow	Perm
19:00 YET (UTC+5)	Shavayev 37'; Ogude (yellow card) 49'; Salugin 80' (yellow card) 88'	Summary	Cauņa (yellow card) 67'	Stadium: Zvezda Stadium; Attendance: 5,175; Referee: Aleksandr Egorov

7 March 2016 19	Anzhi Makhachkala	0 – 1	Amkar Perm	Kaspiysk
19:00 YET (UTC+5)	Boli (yellow card) 30'	Summary	Peev 3'; Balanovich (yellow card) 64'	Stadium: Anzhi Arena; Attendance: 8,100; Referee: Aleksei Matyunin

12 March 2016 20	Spartak Moscow	2 – 1	Amkar Perm	Moscow
19:00 YET (UTC+5)	Zé Luís 82'; Promes 87' (pen.); Granat (yellow card) 90+1'	Summary	Komolov 36'; Zaytsev (yellow card) 54'; Dzhikiya (yellow card) 65'; Zanev (yellow card) 84'; Gol (yellow card) 85'	Stadium: Otkrytiye Arena; Attendance: 20,702; Referee: Aleksandr Egorov

18 March 2016 21	Amkar Perm	0 – 0	Rostov	Perm
19:00 YET (UTC+5)	Peev (yellow card) 54'; Komolov (yellow card) 90+1'	Summary	Poloz (yellow card) 54'; Kanga (yellow card) 76'	Stadium: Zvezda Stadium; Attendance: 9,370; Referee: Igor Fedotov

2 April 2016 22	Kuban Krasnodar	1 – 1	Amkar Perm	Krasnodar
19:00 YET (UTC+5)	Bucur (yellow card) 23'; Seleznyov 41' (pen.)	Summary	Belorukov (yellow card) 32'; Salugin (yellow card) 37'; Ogude (yellow card) 51'; Prudnikov 65'	Stadium: Kuban Stadium; Attendance: 5,926; Referee: Alexey Nikolaev

9 April 2016 23	Amkar Perm	0 – 2	Zenit St.Petersburg	Perm
16:30 YET (UTC+5)	Gol (yellow card) 20'; Zanev (yellow card) 26'; Anene (yellow card) 27'; Belorukov (yellow card) 56'; Selikhov (yellow card) 86'; Zaytsev (yellow card) 90'	Summary	Neto (yellow card) 8'; Hulk (yellow card) 23'; Dzyuba 30'; Smolnikov (yellow card) 56'; Lodygin (yellow card) 65'; Kokorin 86'	Stadium: Zvezda Stadium; Attendance: 15,350; Referee: Vitaly Meshkov

15 April 2016 24	Mordovia Saransk	1 – 1	Amkar Perm	Saransk
21:00 YET (UTC+5)	Rykov (yellow card) 59'; Dudiyev (yellow card) 71'; Nakhushev (yellow card) 72'	Summary	Dzhikiya 32' (yellow card) 60'	Stadium: Start Stadium; Attendance: 5,051; Referee: Kirill Levnikov

24 April 2016 25	Amkar Perm	0 – 1	Lokomotiv Moscow	Perm
14:00 YET (UTC+5)	Gigolayev (yellow card) 43'; Dzhikiya (yellow card) 44'; Belorukov (yellow card) 72'; Idowu (yellow card) 81'	Summary	Škuletić 19'; Pejčinović (yellow card) 44'	Stadium: Zvezda Stadium; Attendance: 5,850; Referee: Sergey Ivanov

29 April 2016 26	Dynamo Moscow	0 – 0	Amkar Perm	Khimki
21:00 YET (UTC+5)	Morozov (yellow card) 58'	Summary	Ogude (yellow card) 79'; Gigolayev (yellow card) 83'	Stadium: Arena Khimki; Attendance: 6,872; Referee: Mikhail Vilkov

8 May 2016 27	Amkar Perm	1 – 1	Ural	Perm
16:30 YET (UTC+5)	Gol 4'; Ogude (yellow card) 89' (yellow-red card) 90+3'; Butko (yellow card) 90+3'	Summary	Gogniyev 38'	Stadium: Zvezda Stadium; Attendance: 7,350; Referee: Aleksei Matyunin

12 May 2016 28	Terek Grozny	2 – 0	Amkar Perm	Grozny
21:00 YET (UTC+5)	Rybus 14'; Mbengue 34' (yellow card) 83'; Ivanov (yellow card) 44'; Grozav (yellow card) 90+4'	Summary	Zaytsev (yellow card) 66'; Balanovich (yellow card) 68'	Stadium: Akhmat-Arena; Attendance: 15,735; Referee: Alexey Nikolaev

16 May 2016 29	Amkar Perm	1 – 0	Ufa	Perm
19:00 YET (UTC+5)	Dzhikiya 82'; Butko (yellow card) 86'; Gol (yellow card) 88'	Summary	Sysuyev (yellow card) 15'; Handžić (yellow card) 87'	Stadium: Zvezda Stadium; Attendance: 6,750; Referee: Aleksey Eskov

21 May 2016 30	Krasnodar	1 – 0	Amkar Perm	Krasnodar
15:30 YET (UTC+5)	Mamayev 33'; Torbinski (yellow card) 37'; Kaleshin (yellow card) 74'; Joãozinho (yellow card) 84'; Bystrov (yellow card) 89'	Summary	Zaytsev (yellow card) 29'; Ogude (yellow card) 84'; Gigolayev (yellow card) 90+3'	Stadium: Kuban Stadium; Attendance: 11,150; Referee: Evgeny Turbin

==== Table ====
Pos	Team	Pld	W	D	L	GF	GA	GD	Pts	Qualification or relegation
9	Krylia Sovetov Samara	30	9	8	13	19	31	−12	35	
10	Rubin Kazan	30	9	6	15	33	39	−6	33	
11	Amkar Perm	30	7	10	13	22	33	−11	31	
12	Ufa	30	6	9	15	25	44	−19	27	
13	Anzhi Makhachkala (O)	30	6	8	16	28	50	−22	26	Qualification for the Relegation play-offs

Source: Russian Premier League, Soccerway
Rules for classification: 1) Points; 2) Matches won; 3) Head-to-head points; 4) Head-to-head matches won; 5) Head-to-head goal difference; 6) Head-to-head goals scored; 7) Head-to-head away goals; 8) Goal difference; 9) Goals scored; 10) Away goals scored.
(O) Play-off winners

=== Russian Cup ===
24 September 2015 Round of 32	Spartak Nalchik	0 – 2	Amkar Perm	Nalchik
18:30 YET (UTC+5)	Guguyev (yellow card) 77'	Summary	Jovičić 20'; Belorukov (yellow card) 37'; Balanovich 60' (yellow card) 88'	Stadium: Spartak Stadium; Attendance: 4,500; Referee: Roman Chernov

29 October 2015 Round of 16	Lokomotiv Moscow	0 – 1	Amkar Perm	Moscow
21:00 YET (UTC+5)	Barinov (yellow card) 28'; Maicon (yellow card) 90+2'	Summary	Cherenchikov (yellow card) 53'; Dzhikiya 57'; Selikhov (yellow card) 90+3'	Stadium: Lokomotiv Stadium; Attendance: 8,185; Referee: Sergei Kulikov

2 March 2016 Quarterfinal	Amkar Perm	3 – 1	Dynamo Moscow	Perm
19:00 YET (UTC+5)	Gol (yellow card) 20'; Prudnikov 26'; Zaytsev 41'; Shavayev 90+3' (pen.)	Summary	Kozlov (yellow card) 64'; Drahun 87'; Hubočan 90+3'	Stadium: Zvezda Stadium; Attendance: 7,300; Referee: Vladimir Moskalyov

20 April 2016 Semifinal	Amkar Perm	1 – 1 (3 – 4 p)	Zenit St.Petersburg	Perm
19:00 YET (UTC+5)	Idowu 19'; Belorukov (yellow card) 62'; Selikhov (yellow card) 87'; Zanev (yellow card) 101'; Ogude (yellow card) 110'	Summary	Kokorin (yellow card) 32'; García 41'; Yusupov (yellow card) 59'; Garay (yellow card) 73'; Dzyuba (yellow card) 119'	Stadium: Zvezda Stadium; Attendance: 15,660; Referee: Igor Fedotov
	Penalties
	Peev (penalty missed); Shavayev (penalty missed); Ogude (penalty scored); Selikhov (penalty scored); Prudnikov (penalty scored); Zaytsev (penalty missed)		(penalty scored) Hulk; (penalty missed) Garay; (penalty missed) Dzyuba; (penalty scored) Witsel; (penalty scored) Criscito; (penalty scored) García

== Squad statistics ==
As of Match played 21 May 2016

=== Appearances and goals ===
No.	Pos	Nat	Player	Total		Premier League		Russian Cup	
No.	Pos	Nat	Player	Apps	Goals	Apps	Goals	Apps	Goals
1	GK	(Russia) RUS	Roman Gerus	7	0	7	0	0	0
3	DF	(Bulgaria) BUL	Petar Zanev	27	0	23	0	4	0
4	DF	(Russia) RUS	Nikolai Zaytsev	26	1	17+5	0	3+1	1
5	MF	(Poland) POL	Janusz Gol	30	3	27	3	3	0
8	MF	(Nigeria) NGR	Fegor Ogude	26	0	22	0	4	0
9	FW	(Russia) RUS	Aleksandr Prudnikov	32	3	20+9	2	3	1
10	FW	(Nigeria) NGR	Bright Dike	4	0	2+2	0	0	0
11	FW	(Norway) NOR	Chuma Anene	16	1	5+9	1	2	0
13	MF	(Russia) RUS	Roland Gigolayev	8	0	6+2	0	0	0
14	DF	(Russia) RUS	Georgi Dzhikiya	24	3	16+6	2	1+1	1
15	GK	(Russia) RUS	Dmitri Khomich	1	0	0	0	1	0
16	MF	(Belarus) BLR	Syarhey Balanovich	30	1	25+1	0	4	1
17	MF	(Russia) RUS	David Dzakhov	4	0	2+2	0	0	0
18	FW	(Russia) RUS	Aleksei Kurzenyov	3	0	0+3	0	0	0
19	DF	(Russia) RUS	Brian Idowu	25	1	15+7	0	2+1	1
20	MF	(Russia) RUS	Pavel Komolov	19	1	12+5	1	2	0
21	DF	(Russia) RUS	Dmitri Belorukov	21	1	17+1	1	3	0
22	MF	(Russia) RUS	Alikhan Shavayev	21	5	9+8	4	1+3	1
23	DF	(Russia) RUS	Ivan Cherenchikov	13	0	11+1	0	1	0
33	MF	(Serbia) SRB	Branko Jovičić	18	1	10+6	0	1+1	1
36	MF	(Russia) RUS	Aleksandr Pantsyrev	2	0	0+2	0	0	0
57	GK	(Russia) RUS	Aleksandr Selikhov	26	0	23	0	3	0
77	FW	(Russia) RUS	Aleksandr Salugin	22	3	8+12	3	1+1	0
91	DF	(Ukraine) UKR	Bohdan Butko	29	0	26	0	3	0
99	MF	(Ukraine) UKR	Oleh Mishchenko	1	0	1	0	0	0
Players who left Amkar Perm on loan:
50	DF	(Armenia) ARM	Robert Arzumanyan	5	0	5	0	0	0
Players who left Amkar Perm during the season:
7	MF	(Bulgaria) BUL	Georgi Peev	23	3	15+5	3	1+2	0
43	MF	(Nigeria) NGR	Izunna Uzochukwu	11	0	6+3	0	1+1	0

=== Goal Scorers ===
Place	Position	Nation	Number	Name	Premier League	Russian Cup	Total
1	MF	(Russia)	22	Alikhan Shavayev	4	1	5
2	FW	(Russia)	77	Aleksandr Salugin	3	0	3
2	MF	(Bulgaria)	7	Georgi Peev	3	0	3
2	MF	(Poland)	5	Janusz Gol	3	0	3
2	DF	(Russia)	14	Georgi Dzhikiya	2	1	3
2	FW	(Russia)	9	Aleksandr Prudnikov	2	1	3
7				Own goal	2	0	2
8	DF	(Russia)	21	Dmitri Belorukov	1	0	1
8	FW	(Norway)	11	Chuma Anene	1	0	1
8	MF	(Russia)	20	Pavel Komolov	1	0	1
8	MF	(Serbia)	33	Branko Jovičić	0	1	1
8	MF	(Belarus)	16	Syarhey Balanovich	0	1	1
8	DF	(Russia)	4	Nikolai Zaytsev	0	1	1
DF	(Russia)	19	Brian Idowu	0	1	1	
				TOTALS	22	7	29

=== Disciplinary record ===
Number	Nation	Position	Name	Russian Premier League		Russian Cup		Total	
Number	Nation	Position	Name	Yellow card	Red card	Yellow card	Red card	Yellow card	Red card
1	(Russia)	GK	Roman Gerus	1	0	0	0	1	0
3	(Bulgaria)	DF	Petar Zanev	8	0	1	0	9	0
4	(Russia)	DF	Nikolai Zaytsev	4	0	0	0	4	0
5	(Poland)	MF	Janusz Gol	3	0	1	0	4	0
7	(Bulgaria)	MF	Georgi Peev	3	0	0	0	3	0
8	(Nigeria)	MF	Fegor Ogude	12	2	1	0	13	2
9	(Russia)	FW	Aleksandr Prudnikov	4	1	0	0	4	1
11	(Norway)	FW	Chuma Anene	1	0	0	0	1	0
13	(Russia)	MF	Roland Gigolayev	3	0	0	0	3	0
14	(Russia)	DF	Georgi Dzhikiya	7	0	0	0	7	0
16	(Belarus)	MF	Syarhey Balanovich	3	0	1	0	4	0
19	(Russia)	DF	Brian Idowu	2	0	0	0	2	0
20	(Russia)	MF	Pavel Komolov	2	0	0	0	2	0
21	(Russia)	DF	Dmitri Belorukov	8	0	2	0	10	0
22	(Russia)	MF	Alikhan Shavayev	2	0	0	0	2	0
23	(Russia)	DF	Ivan Cherenchikov	6	0	1	0	7	0
33	(Serbia)	MF	Branko Jovičić	1	0	0	0	1	0
43	(Nigeria)	MF	Izunna Uzochukwu	2	0	0	0	2	0
57	(Russia)	GK	Aleksandr Selikhov	3	0	2	0	5	0
77	(Russia)	FW	Aleksandr Salugin	3	0	0	0	3	0
91	(Ukraine)	DF	Bohdan Butko	2	0	0	0	2	0
			TOTALS	80	3	9	0	89	3
