= Aleksandr Selikhov =

Russian footballer (born 1994)

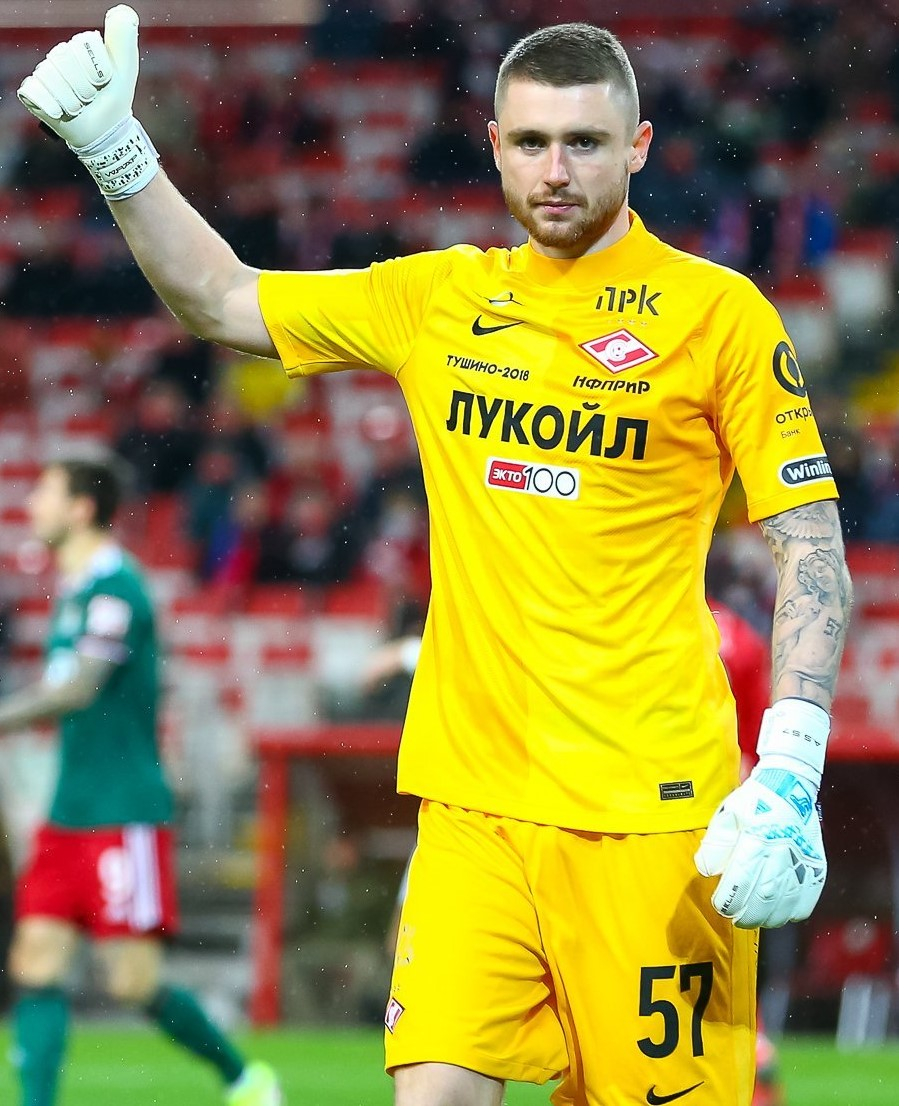
- Selikhov with Spartak Moscow in 2021

Personal information
- Full name: Aleksandr Aleksandrovich Selikhov
- Date of birth: 7 April 1994 (age 32)
- Place of birth: Naryshkino, Russia
- Height: 1.90 m (6 ft 3 in)
- Position: Goalkeeper

Team information
- Current team: Ural Yekaterinburg
- Number: 57

Senior career*
Years	Team	Apps	(Gls)
2012–2014	Oryol	9	(0)
2013–2014	→ Amkar Perm (loan)	0	(0)
2014–2016	Amkar Perm	40	(0)
2016–2025	Spartak Moscow	74	(0)
2025–	Ural Yekaterinburg	35	(1)

International career
2014–2016	Russia U-21	6	(0)
2022	Russia	1	(0)
- * Club domestic league appearances and goals as of 25 October 2026

Aleksandr Aleksandrovich Selikhov (Russian: Александр Александрович Селихов; born 7 April 1994) is a Russian football player who plays as a goalkeeper for Ural Yekaterinburg.

== Club career ==
=== FC Oryol ===
He made his debut in the Russian Second Division for Rusichi Oryol on 29 May 2012 in a game against FC Kaluga.

=== Amkar Perm ===
After a loan spell with Russian Football Premier League club Amkar Perm, in July 2014 he signed 2-year deal for Amkar. He made his Russian Football Premier League debut for Amkar in a game against FC Rostov on 28 August 2015 when the first two goalkeeping choices for Amkar, Roman Gerus and Dmitri Khomich were injured.

=== Spartak Moscow ===
On 22 November 2016, he signed a contract with Spartak Moscow that began on 6 December 2016, he continued to play for Amkar until that date. Following injury to Artem Rebrov in September 2017 during a UEFA Champions League 1-1 home match against Liverpool, Selikhov impressed with his performances and became the first choice goalkeeper for the remainder of the season.

In May 2018, Selikhov was injured, forcing him to lose his place in the starting 11 and also miss out on the inclusion to the Russia national team's final squad for the 2018 FIFA World Cup. After completing his recovery, he became only a second choice to Aleksandr Maksimenko and at times plated for the reserve team. Maksimenko remained a starter until a streak of unsatisfactory performances and was replaced by Selikhov in October 2021.

On 9 December 2021, Selikhov saved a stoppage time penalty to keep his side 0-1 up against Legia Warsaw and at the top of the Europa league group, which was so close that even a tie would result in Spartak's elimination.

On 14 October 2022, Selikhov extended his contract with Spartak until the end of the 2024–25 season, with an automatic one-year extension clause if certain conditions are met. He has since been the joint-first choice goalkeeper along with Maksimenko.

On 22 October 2024, Selikhov marked 100 matches for Spartak in a 1–0 Cup win against Dynamo Makhachkala.

On 22 January 2025, Selikhov left Spartak by mutual consent.

=== Ural Yekaterinburg ===
On 19 February 2025, Selikhov signed with Ural Yekaterinburg.

On 25 October 2026, Selikhov scored the go-ahead goal in a 3–1 game against Chelyabinsk from a free kick in the 87th minute.

== International career ==
Selikhov earned 6 caps for the U-21 national team between 2014 and 2016.

He played his first match for the Russian national team on 17 November 2022 in an away friendly draw against Tajikistan, during which he kept a clean sheet.

== Career statistics ==
=== Club ===
As of match played 25 October 2026

Appearances and goals by club, season and competition
Club	Season	League			Cup		Europe		Other		Total	
Club	Season	Division	Apps	Goals	Apps	Goals	Apps	Goals	Apps	Goals	Apps	Goals
Oryol	2011–12	Russian Second League	1	0	0	0	—		—		1	0
Oryol	2012–13	Russian Second League	8	0	1	0	—		—		9	0
Oryol	Total		9	0	1	0	—		—		10	0
Amkar Perm	2013–14	Russian Premier League	0	0	0	0	—		—		0	0
Amkar Perm	2014–15	Russian Premier League	0	0	0	0	—		—		0	0
Amkar Perm	2015–16	Russian Premier League	23	0	3	0	—		—		26	0
Amkar Perm	2016–17	Russian Premier League	17	0	1	0	—		—		18	0
Amkar Perm	Total		40	0	4	0	—		—		44	0
Spartak-2 Moscow	2016–17	Russian First League	3	0	—		—		—		3	0
Spartak-2 Moscow	2017–18	Russian First League	1	0	—		—		—		1	0
Spartak-2 Moscow	2020–21	Russian First League	10	0	—		—		—		10	0
Spartak-2 Moscow	2021–22	Russian First League	1	0	—		—		—		1	0
Spartak-2 Moscow	Total		15	0	—		—		—		15	0
Spartak Moscow	2016–17	Russian Premier League	1	0	—		—		—		1	0
Spartak Moscow	2017–18	Russian Premier League	21	0	3	0	6 (Note: Five appearances in the UEFA Champions League, one appearance in the UEFA Europa League)	0	—		30	0
Spartak Moscow	2018–19	Russian Premier League	5	0	1	0	0	0	—		6	0
Spartak Moscow	2019–20	Russian Premier League	0	0	0	0	0	0	—		0	0
Spartak Moscow	2020–21	Russian Premier League	1	0	0	0	—		—		1	0
Spartak Moscow	2021–22	Russian Premier League	14	0	0	0	3 (Note: Appearances in the UEFA Europa League)	0	—		17	0
Spartak Moscow	2022–23	Russian Premier League	27	0	0	0	—		1 (Note: Appearances in the Russian Super Cup)	0	28	0
Spartak Moscow	2023–24	Russian Premier League	5	0	6	0	—		—		11	0
Spartak Moscow	2024–25	Russian Premier League	0	0	8	0	—		—		8	0
Spartak Moscow	Total		74	0	18	0	9	0	1	0	102	0
Ural Yekaterinburg	2024–25	Russian First League	8	0	0	0	—		0	0	8	0
Ural Yekaterinburg	2025–26	Russian First League	27	1	0	0	—		2 (Note: Appearances in promotion play-offs)	0	29	1
Ural Yekaterinburg	Total		35	1	0	0	0	0	2	0	37	1
Career total			173	1	23	0	9	0	3	0	208	1

=== International ===
As of match played 17 November 2022

Appearances and goals by national team and year
National team	Year	Apps	Goals
Russia	2022	1	0
Total		1	0

== Club Honours ==
Spartak Moscow

- Russian Premier League: 2016-17
- Russian Super Cup: 2017
