= Alexey Orlov =

Alexey Orlov may refer to:

- Alexei Grigoryevich Orlov (1737–1808), Russian count
- Aleksey Orlov (politician) (born 1961), Russian politician
- Aleksei Orlov (footballer) (born 1997), Russian footballer
- Alexey Fyodorovich Orlov (1787–1862), Russian diplomat
