= Chuma Anene =

Norwegian footballer (born 1993)

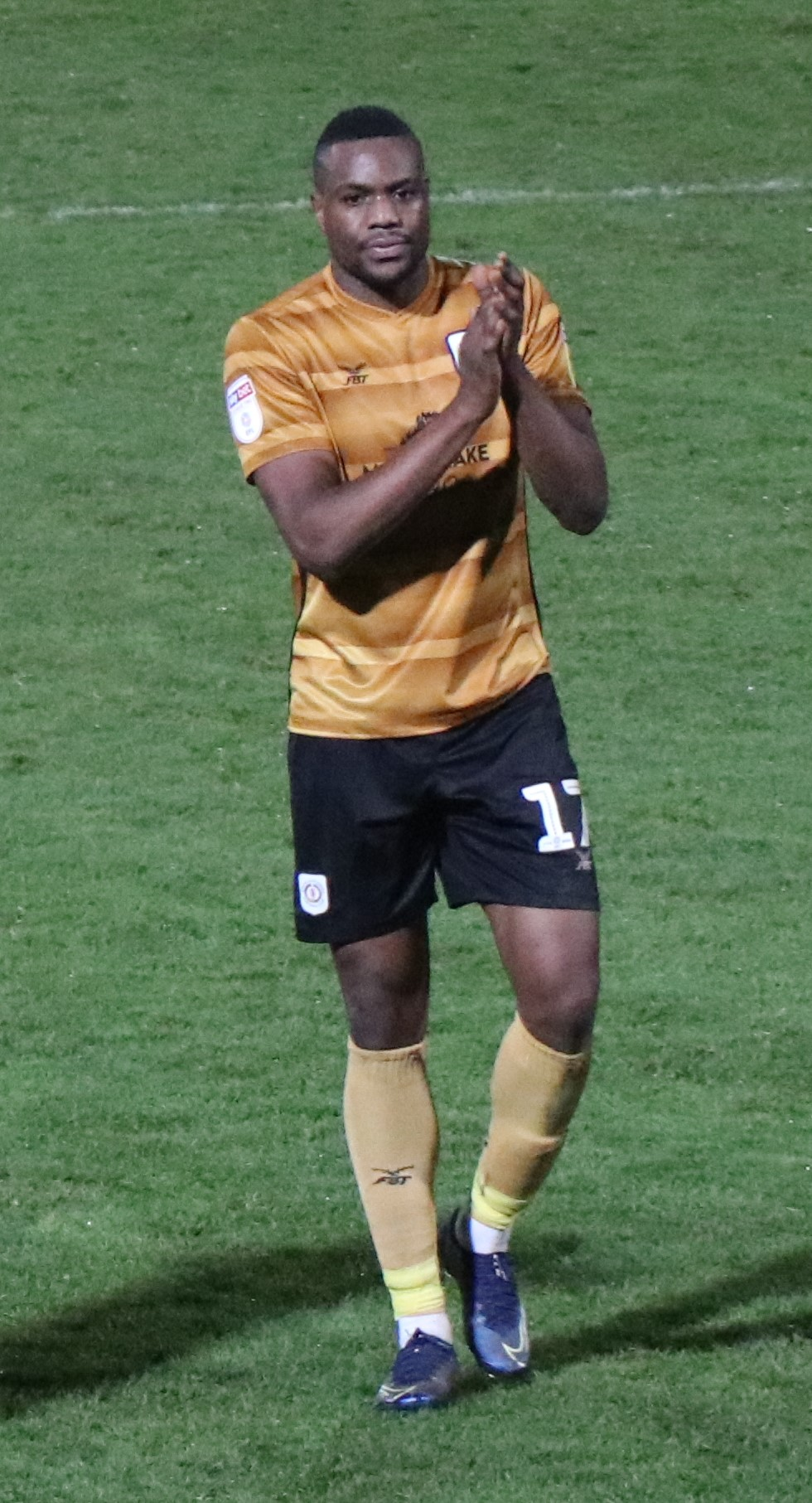
- Anene after scoring twice for Crewe at Stevenage (December 2019)

Personal information
- Full name: Chuma Emeka Uche Anene
- Date of birth: 14 May 1993 (age 33)
- Place of birth: Oslo, Norway
- Height: 1.88 m (6 ft 2 in)
- Position: Forward

Youth career
- –2000: Holmlia
- 2001–2010: Vålerenga

Senior career*
Years	Team	Apps	(Gls)
2010–2013	Vålerenga	24	(3)
2012	→ Ullensaker/Kisa (loan)	5	(0)
2013	→ Stabæk (loan)	12	(4)
2014	Ullensaker/Kisa	14	(2)
2014–2015	Rabotnichki	29	(9)
2015–2017	Amkar Perm	24	(2)
2017–2018	Kairat	29	(8)
2018	Fredericia	7	(0)
2019–2021	Midtjylland	0	(0)
2019	→ Fredericia (loan)	2	(0)
2019	→ Jerv (loan)	15	(5)
2019–2020	→ Crewe Alexandra (loan)	28	(7)
2021–2022	Sandefjord	1	(0)
2022	Omonia Aradippou		

International career
2009	Norway U16	6	(5)
2010	Norway U17	7	(2)
2012	Norway U19	1	(0)
2012	Norway U20	4	(0)
- * Club domestic league appearances and goals as of 12 November 2021

Chuma Emeka Uche Anene (born 14 May 1993) is a Norwegian footballer who plays as a striker.

== Early life ==
Anene was born in Oslo to parents of Nigerian heritage, and grew up at the borough of Holmlia, and played at the same team as players like Mohammed Fellah, Ohi Omoijuanfo, Mathis Bolly, Adama Diomande, Haitam Aleesami and Akinsola Akinyemi.

== Club career ==
Anene was brought to Vålerenga from Holmlia SK at the age of 16. He signed a professional contract at Vålerenga before the 2012 season, after making the debut in the 2011 season. He can play both as a striker and winger in Vålerenga's playing style. At 27 November 2011, he scored his first goal in Tippeligaen against Stabæk.

During the first half of the 2013 season, Anene played four matches for Vålerenga in the Tippeligaen. In August 2013 he joined Stabæk, then a second-tier team, on loan to the end of the season, with an option to buy. He scored a goal in his debut for Stabæk on 11 August 2013 when Strømmen was beaten 3–2. In 2014, he signed for Ullensaker/Kisa.

In the summer of 2015, he moved to the Russian Football Premier League side FC Amkar Perm. On 20 September 2015, on his Amkar debut, he scored a goal, helping his new club to reach a 1–1 away draw against the defending champions FC Zenit Saint Petersburg.

On 13 March 2017, Amkar Perm announced that Anene had left the club to join Kazakhstan Premier League side FC Kairat, with Kairat confirming the signing of Anene on a two-year contract two days later.

On 4 September 2018, Anene signed for Danish club FC Fredericia in the Danish 1st Division until the end of the year. But at the same time, he signed a pre-contract with Danish Superliga club FC Midtjylland when his contract at Fredericia expired. This deal was made as a strategy between two clubs with a good cooperation, because Midtjylland did not get to sign him before the transfer window closed, so they made Fredericia sign him for them, so he could join Midtjylland later. But despite joining Midtjylland on 1 January 2019, he stayed at FC Fredericia on loan for the rest of the season. On 29 March 2019, Midtjylland decided to recall him from Fredericia, and loan him out to Norwegian club FK Jerv.

In August 2019 he moved on loan to Crewe Alexandra, and made his first team debut coming on as a second-half substitute for Chris Porter in an EFL Cup second round tie against Aston Villa at Gresty Road on 27 August. He made his first start in a Crewe shirt on 3 September 2019 in an EFL Trophy tie against Burton Albion at Gresty Road, and scored his first league goal on 14 September 2019, against Cambridge United at Gresty Road. In November 2019, Anene was withdrawn from two games as a precaution following a head injury sustained at Northampton Town, returning in December to score five goals in three games, including two in a 5-1 Crewe win at Stevenage on 21 December.

== International career ==
Anene has represented Norway at under-16, under-17, under-19 and under-20 level.

== Career statistics ==
=== Club ===
As of match played 12 September 2021

Appearances and goals by club, season and competition
Club	Season	League			National Cup		Continental		Other		Total	
Club	Season	Division	Apps	Goals	Apps	Goals	Apps	Goals	Apps	Goals	Apps	Goals
Vålerenga	2011	Eliteserien	6	1	0	0	0	0	—		6	1
Vålerenga	2012	Eliteserien	14	2	2	1	—		—		16	3
Vålerenga	2013	Eliteserien	4	0	1	0	—		—		5	0
Vålerenga	Total		24	3	3	1	—		—		27	4
Ullensaker/Kisa (loan)	2011	Norwegian First Division	5	0	1	0	—		—		6	0
Stabæk (loan)	2013	Norwegian First Division	12	4	0	0	—		—		12	4
Ullensaker/Kisa	2014	Norwegian First Division	14	2	3	3	—		—		17	5
Rabotnički	2014–15	Macedonian First League	27	7	5	0	2	0	—		34	7
Rabotnički	2015–16	Macedonian First League	2	2	0	0	8	1	—		10	3
Rabotnički	Total		29	9	5	0	10	1	—		44	10
Amkar Perm	2015–16	Russian Premier League	14	1	2	0	—		—		16	1
Amkar Perm	2016–17	Russian Premier League	10	1	2	0	—		—		12	1
Amkar Perm	Total		24	2	4	0	—		—		28	2
Kairat	2017	Kazakhstan Premier League	20	4	4	0	4	0	—		28	4
Kairat	2018	Kazakhstan Premier League	9	4	0	0	0	0	—		9	4
Kairat	Total		29	8	4	0	4	0	—		37	8
FC Fredericia (loan)	2018–19	Danish 1st Division	9	0	0	0	—		—		9	0
Jerv (loan)	2019	Norwegian First Division	15	5	0	0	—		—		15	5
Crewe Alexandra (loan)	2019–20	EFL League Two	28	7	2	2	—		4 (Note: One appearance in the EFL Cup, three appearances in the EFL Trophy)	0	34	9
Sandefjord	2021	Eliteserien	1	0	0	0	—		—		1	0
Career total			190	40	22	6	14	1	4	0	230	47
