= Georgi Dzhikiya =

Russian footballer (born 1993)

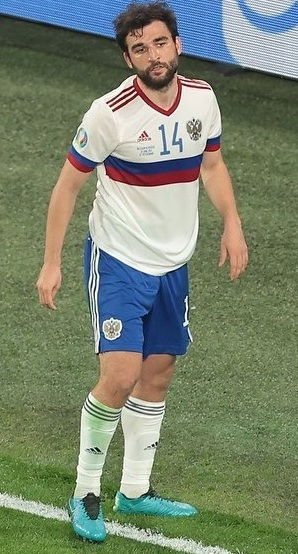
- Dzhikiya playing for Russia in 2021

Personal information
- Full name: Georgi Tamazovich Dzhikiya
- Date of birth: 21 November 1993 (age 32)
- Place of birth: Moscow, Russia
- Height: 1.88 m (6 ft 2 in)
- Position: Defender

Team information
- Current team: Lokomotiv Moscow
- Number: 14

Youth career
- 2003–2010: Lokomotiv Moscow

Senior career*
Years	Team	Apps	(Gls)
2011–2013	Lokomotiv-2 Moscow	64	(2)
2014	Spartak Nalchik	8	(0)
2014–2015	Khimik Dzerzhinsk	31	(2)
2015–2016	Amkar Perm	38	(3)
2017–2024	Spartak Moscow	164	(5)
2024–2025	Khimki	17	(0)
2025–2026	Antalyaspor	15	(2)
2026–	Lokomotiv Moscow	5	(0)

International career^{‡}
2017–	Russia	44	(2)
- * Club domestic league appearances and goals as of 6 November 2026 ‡ National team caps and goals as of 16 October 2023

Georgi Tamazovich Dzhikiya (Russian: Георгий Тамазович Джикия; born 21 November 1993) is a Russian professional footballer who plays as a centre-back for Lokomotiv Moscow.

== Early life ==
Dzhikiya was born on 21 November 1993 in Moscow, Russia. Ethnic Mingrelians, his family had previously moved from Sukhumi, Abkhazia^{α}.

== Club career ==
He made his debut in the Russian Second Division for FC Lokomotiv-2 Moscow on 24 May 2011 in a game against FC Volochanin-Ratmir Vyshny Volochyok.

On 26 December 2016, he signed a contract with FC Spartak Moscow.

On 18 January 2018, he suffered an ACL tear that kept him from playing until August 2018, he was forced to miss the 2018 FIFA World Cup that was held in Russia.

On 15 August 2021, he extended his contract with Spartak until 31 May 2024, with an additional one-year extension option.

On 18 May 2024, Spartak announced that Dzhikiya would leave the club at the end of the season as his contract will not be extended.

On 24 June 2026, Dzhikiya returned to his youth club Lokomotiv Moscow on a one-season contract.

== International career ==
In November 2016, he was called up to the Russia national football team for the first time for the friendly games against Qatar on 10 November 2016 and Romania on 15 November 2016. He made his debut on 5 June 2017 in a friendly against Hungary.

In the 2017 FIFA Confederations Cup, he spent all three matches without substitutions - against New Zealand (2–0), Portugal (0–1) and Mexico (1–2). In the game with the Portuguese, he received a yellow card.

He missed the 2018 FIFA World Cup, which Russia hosted, due to injury.

On 16 November 2019 he scored his first goal for the national team in the Euro 2020 qualifier against Belgium.

On 11 May 2021, he was included in the preliminary extended 30-man squad for UEFA Euro 2020. On 2 June 2021, he was included in the final squad. He played the full match in all three of Russia's games as Russia was eliminated at group stage.

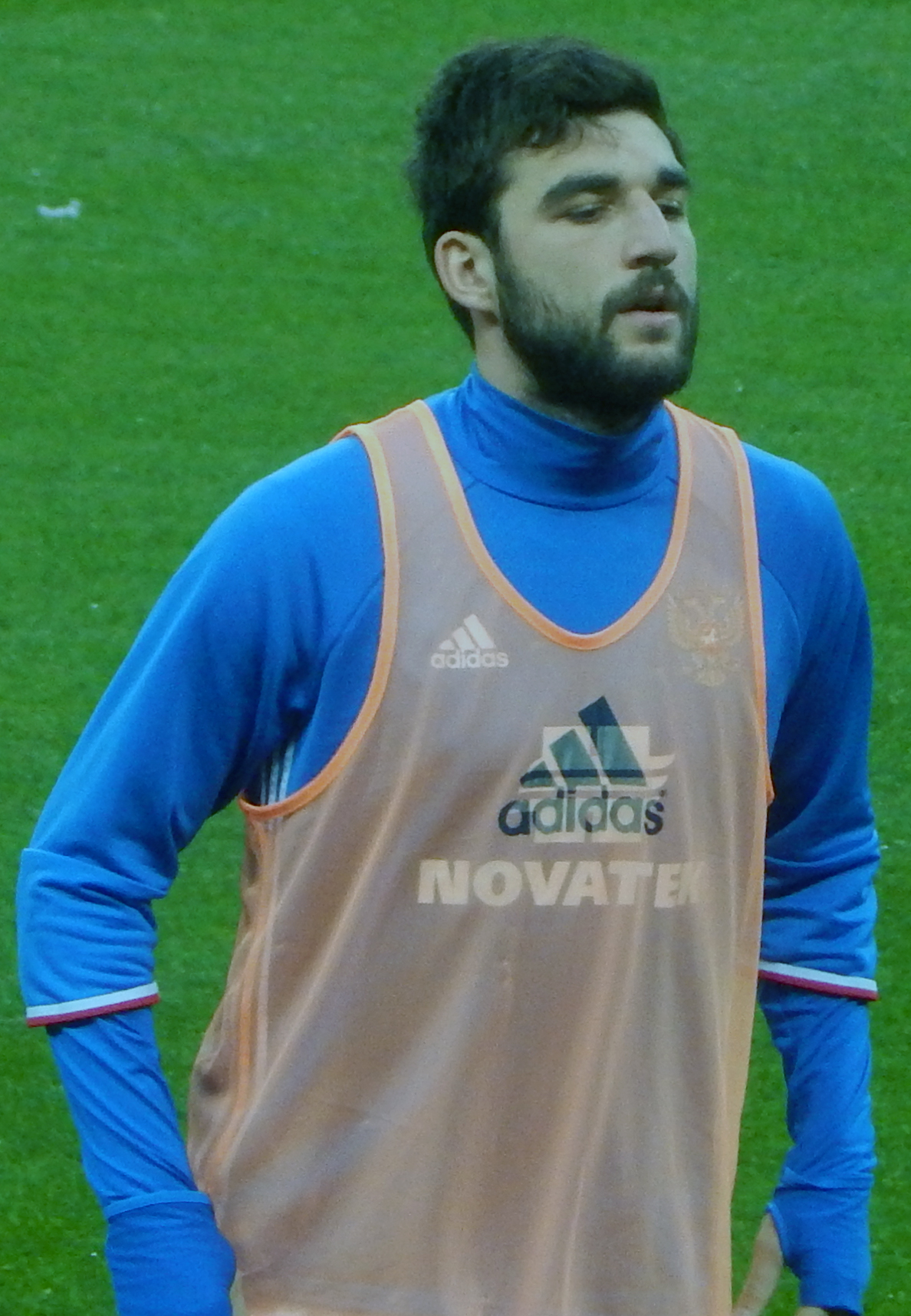
Friendly match against Argentina in 2017

== Style of play ==
Dzhikiya is a left-footed defender, playing primarily as a centre-back, who can also play as a left-back. Comfortable on the ball with his slightly weaker right foot, at times he had played as a right-sided central defender as well, in a center-back partnership with another left-footed defender or even as part of the back-three on the right.

== Career statistics ==
=== Club ===
As of match played 6 November 2026

Appearances and goals by club, season and competition
Club	Season	League			Russian Cup		Continental		Other		Total	
Club	Season	Division	Apps	Goals	Apps	Goals	Apps	Goals	Apps	Goals	Apps	Goals
Lokomotiv-2 Moscow	2011–12	Russian Second League	22	0	2	0	—		—		24	0
Lokomotiv-2 Moscow	2012–13	Russian Second League	21	1	2	0	—		—		23	1
Lokomotiv-2 Moscow	2013–14	Russian Second League	21	1	0	0	—		—		21	1
Lokomotiv-2 Moscow	Total		64	2	4	0	—		—		68	2
Spartak Nalchik	2013–14	Russian First League	8	0	—		—		—		8	0
Khimik Dzerzhinsk	2014–15	Russian First League	31	2	2	0	—		—		33	2
Amkar Perm	2015–16	Russian Premier League	22	2	3	1	—		—		25	3
Amkar Perm	2016–17	Russian Premier League	16	1	1	0	—		—		17	1
Amkar Perm	Total		38	3	4	1	—		—		42	4
Spartak Moscow	2016–17	Russian Premier League	8	0	—		—		—		8	0
Spartak Moscow	2017–18	Russian Premier League	17	1	2	0	5 (Note: Appearances in UEFA Champions League)	0	1 (Note: Appearance in Russian Super Cup)	0	25	1
Spartak Moscow	2018–19	Russian Premier League	26	2	3	0	6 (Note: One appearance in UEFA Champions League, five appearances in UEFA Europa League)	0	—		35	2
Spartak Moscow	2019–20	Russian Premier League	27	1	4	0	4 (Note: Appearances in EFA Europa League)	0	—		35	1
Spartak Moscow	2020–21	Russian Premier League	28	0	2	0	—		—		30	0
Spartak Moscow	2021–22	Russian Premier League	28	1	4	0	8 (Note: Two appearances in UEFA Champions League, six appearances in UEFA Europa League)	0	—		40	1
Spartak Moscow	2022–23	Russian Premier League	22	0	6	0	—		1	0	29	0
Spartak Moscow	2023–24	Russian Premier League	8	0	4	0	—		—		12	0
Spartak Moscow	Total		164	5	25	0	23	0	2	0	214	5
Khimki	2024–25	Russian Premier League	17	0	2	0	—		—		19	0
Antalyaspor	2025–26	Süper Lig	15	2	2	0	—		—		17	2
Lokomotiv Moscow	2026–27	Russian Premier League	5	0	4	0	—		—		9	0
Career total			342	14	43	1	23	0	2	0	410	15

=== International ===
As of match played 16 October 2023

Appearances and goals by national team and year
National team	Year	Apps	Goals
Russia	2017	8	0
Russia	2018	5	0
Russia	2019	10	1
Russia	2020	5	0
Russia	2021	13	1
Russia	2022	1	0
Russia	2023	2	0
Total		44	2

Scores and results list Russia's goal tally first, score column indicates score after each Dzhikiya goal.

List of international goals scored by Georgi Dzhikiya
No.	Date	Venue	Opponent	Score	Result	Competition
1.	16 November 2019	Krestovsky Stadium, Saint Petersburg, Russia	Belgium	1–4	1–4	UEFA Euro 2020 qualification
2.	11 October 2021	Ljudski vrt, Maribor, Slovenia	Slovenia	2–0	2–1	2022 FIFA World Cup qualification

== Honours ==
=== Club ===
Spartak Moscow

- Russian Premier League: 2016–17
- Russian Cup: 2021–22
- Russian Super Cup: 2017

=== Individual ===
- Spartak Moscow Supporters' Golden Boar Award: 2019
- Russian Premier League Centre-back of the Season: 2018–19
- Russian Premier League Team of the Season: 2022–23

== Notes ==
^α Abkhazia, whilst de facto independent, was at the time recognised as part of Georgia by the United Nations and all of its members (Its independence was later recognised by Russia, Nicaragua, Venezuela, Nauru and Syria).
