= Radik Khayrullov =

Russian footballer

Personal information
- Full name: Radik Fesikhovich Khayrullov
- Date of birth: 23 May 1992 (age 34)
- Place of birth: Ulyanovsk, Russia
- Height: 1.90 m (6 ft 3 in)
- Position: Centre-back

Youth career
- DYuSSh Start Ulyanovsk

Senior career*
Years	Team	Apps	(Gls)
2010–2011	FC Volga-D Ulyanovsk		
2012	FC Fakel-D Voronezh		
2013–2014	FC Sergiyevsk		
2014	FC Simkor Ulyanovsk		
2014–2017	FC Volga Ulyanovsk	66	(2)
2017–2019	FC Nizhny Novgorod	48	(7)
2019–2020	FC Armavir	23	(2)
2020–2021	FC Chayka Peschanokopskoye	30	(0)
2021–2022	FC SKA Rostov-on-Don	29	(1)
2022–2023	FC Volga Ulyanovsk	10	(0)
2023–2024	FC Novosibirsk	30	(1)
- * Club domestic league appearances and goals as of 8 June 2024

Radik Fesikhovich Khayrullov (Russian: Радик Фэсихович Хайруллов; born 23 May 1992) is a Russian football player.

== Club career ==
He made his professional debut in the Russian Professional Football League for FC Volga Ulyanovsk on 18 July 2014 in a game against FC Lada-Togliatti Togliatti.

He made his Russian Football National League debut for FC Olimpiyets Nizhny Novgorod on 8 July 2017 in a game against FC Avangard Kursk.
