= Denis Vambolt =

Russian footballer

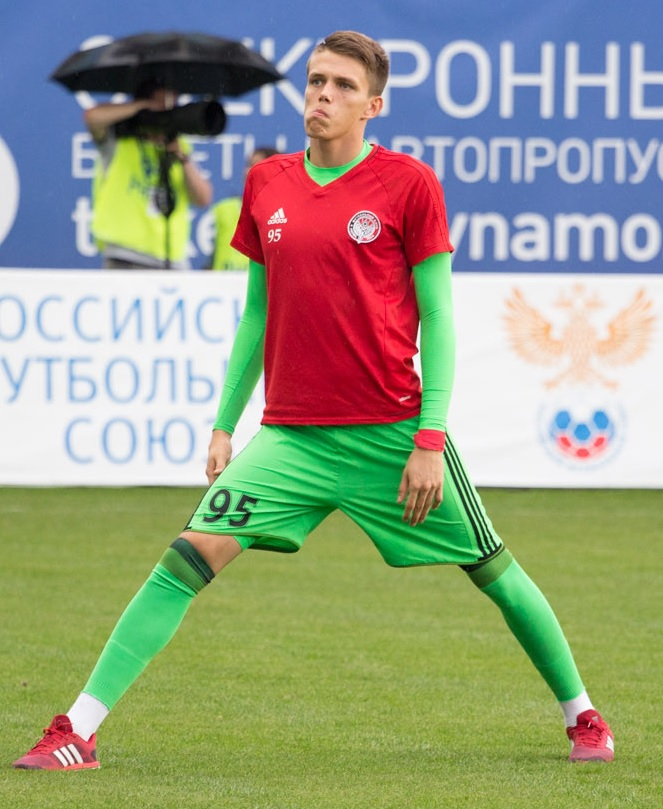
- Vambolt with Amkar in 2017

Personal information
- Full name: Denis Eduardovich Vambolt
- Date of birth: 24 March 1995 (age 31)
- Place of birth: Baltiysk, Russia
- Height: 1.90 m (6 ft 3 in)
- Position: Goalkeeper

Team information
- Current team: FC Shinnik Yaroslavl
- Number: 95

Senior career*
| Years | Team | Apps | (Gls) |
| 2013–2016 | FC Baltika Kaliningrad | 16 | (0) |
| 2017–2018 | FC Amkar Perm | 0 | (0) |
| 2018 | FC Luch Vladivostok | 0 | (0) |
| 2019–2020 | FC Tyumen | 20 | (0) |
| 2020–2021 | FC Dynamo Bryansk | 2 | (0) |
| 2021– | FC Shinnik Yaroslavl | 37 | (0) |
- * Club domestic league appearances and goals as of 16 May 2026

Denis Eduardovich Vambolt (Russian: Денис Эдуардович Вамбольт; born 24 March 1995) is a Russian football goalkeeper who plays for FC Shinnik Yaroslavl.

== Club career ==
He made his debut in the Russian Football National League for FC Baltika Kaliningrad on 20 March 2016 in a game against FC Sibir Novosibirsk.

== Career statistics ==
=== Club ===
As of 10 December 2017

| Club | Season | League | | | Cup | | Continental | | Total | |
| Club | Season | Division | Apps | Goals | Apps | Goals | Apps | Goals | Apps | Goals |
|---|---|---|---|---|---|---|---|---|---|---|
| FC Baltika Kaliningrad | 2013–14 | FNL | 0 | 0 | 0 | 0 | – | | 0 | 0 |
| FC Baltika Kaliningrad | 2014–15 | FNL | 0 | 0 | 0 | 0 | – | | 0 | 0 |
| FC Baltika Kaliningrad | 2015–16 | FNL | 3 | 0 | 0 | 0 | – | | 3 | 0 |
| FC Baltika Kaliningrad | 2016–17 | FNL | 13 | 0 | 1 | 0 | – | | 14 | 0 |
| FC Baltika Kaliningrad | Total | | 16 | 0 | 1 | 0 | 0 | 0 | 17 | 0 |
| FC Amkar Perm | 2016–17 | Russian Premier League | 0 | 0 | – | | – | | 0 | 0 |
| FC Amkar Perm | 2017–18 | Russian Premier League | 0 | 0 | 0 | 0 | – | | 0 | 0 |
| FC Amkar Perm | Total | | 0 | 0 | 0 | 0 | 0 | 0 | 0 | 0 |
| Career total | | | 16 | 0 | 1 | 0 | 0 | 0 | 17 | 0 |
