= Stanislav Prokofyev =

Russian footballer

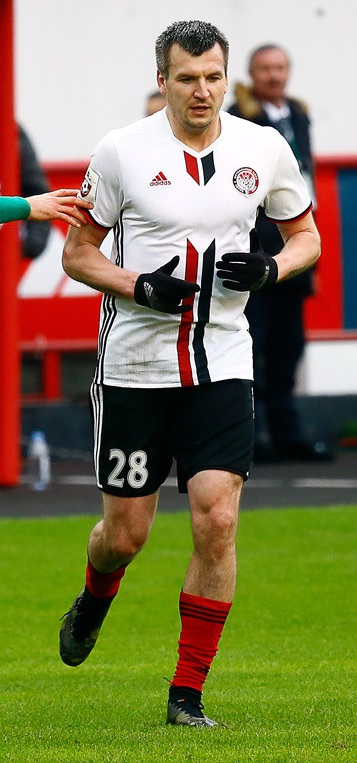
- Prokofyev with Amkar in 2017

Personal information
- Full name: Stanislav Mikhailovich Prokofyev
- Date of birth: 15 February 1987 (age 39)
- Place of birth: Tyumen, Russian SFSR
- Height: 1.87 m (6 ft 2 in)
- Position: Forward

Senior career*
| Years | Team | Apps | (Gls) |
| 2004–2007 | FC Tyumen | 48 | (16) |
| 2008–2010 | FC Volga Nizhny Novgorod | 63 | (25) |
| 2010 | FC Mordovia Saransk | 18 | (3) |
| 2011 | FC Tyumen | 9 | (2) |
| 2011 | FC Gazovik Orenburg | 8 | (1) |
| 2013–2014 | FC Volga Ulyanovsk | 24 | (10) |
| 2014 | FC Luch-Energiya Vladivostok | 16 | (7) |
| 2015 | FC Tosno | 24 | (6) |
| 2016 | FC SKA-Energiya Khabarovsk | 13 | (2) |
| 2016–2018 | FC Amkar Perm | 22 | (2) |
| 2018 | FC Luch Vladivostok | 15 | (2) |
| 2019 | FC Lada Dimitrovgrad | 2 | (2) |
| 2020–2021 | FC Volga Ulyanovsk | 0 | (0) |
- * Club domestic league appearances and goals

Stanislav Mikhailovich Prokofyev (Russian: Станислав Михайлович Прокофьев; born 15 February 1987) is a Russian former professional football player who played as a striker.

== Club career ==
He made his Russian Premier League debut for FC Amkar Perm on 17 September 2016 in a game against FC Terek Grozny.

== Career statistics ==
=== Club ===
As of 20 May 2018

| Club | Season | League | | | Cup | | Continental | | Other | | Total | |
| Club | Season | Division | Apps | Goals | Apps | Goals | Apps | Goals | Apps | Goals | Apps | Goals |
|---|---|---|---|---|---|---|---|---|---|---|---|---|
| FC Tyumen | 2004 | Russian Amateur Football League | – | | | | | | | | | |
| FC Tyumen | 2005 | Russian Amateur Football League | – | | | | | | | | | |
| FC Tyumen | 2006 | PFL | 24 | 8 | 1 | 0 | – | | – | | 25 | 8 |
| FC Tyumen | 2007 | PFL | 24 | 8 | 2 | 3 | – | | – | | 26 | 11 |
| FC Volga Nizhny Novgorod | 2008 | PFL | 29 | 17 | 1 | 0 | – | | – | | 30 | 17 |
| FC Volga Nizhny Novgorod | 2009 | FNL | 26 | 7 | 1 | 1 | – | | – | | 27 | 8 |
| FC Volga Nizhny Novgorod | 2010 | FNL | 8 | 1 | 0 | 0 | – | | – | | 8 | 1 |
| FC Volga Nizhny Novgorod | Total | | 63 | 25 | 2 | 1 | 0 | 0 | 0 | 0 | 65 | 26 |
| FC Mordovia Saransk | 2010 | FNL | 18 | 3 | – | | – | | – | | 18 | 3 |
| FC Gazovik Orenburg | 2011–12 | FNL | 8 | 1 | 1 | 0 | – | | – | | 9 | 1 |
| FC Tyumen | 2011–12 | PFL | 9 | 2 | – | | – | | – | | 9 | 2 |
| FC Tyumen | Total (2 spells) | | 57 | 18 | 3 | 3 | 0 | 0 | 0 | 0 | 60 | 21 |
| FC Volga Ulyanovsk | 2012–13 | PFL | 3 | 1 | 0 | 0 | – | | – | | 3 | 1 |
| FC Volga Ulyanovsk | 2013–14 | PFL | 21 | 9 | 2 | 0 | – | | – | | 23 | 9 |
| FC Volga Ulyanovsk | Total | | 24 | 10 | 2 | 0 | 0 | 0 | 0 | 0 | 26 | 10 |
| FC Luch-Energiya Vladivostok | 2014–15 | FNL | 16 | 7 | 1 | 1 | – | | – | | 17 | 8 |
| FC Tosno | 2014–15 | FNL | 10 | 5 | – | | – | | 2 (Note: Two appearances in promotion play-offs) | 1 | 12 | 6 |
| FC Tosno | 2015–16 | FNL | 14 | 1 | 1 | 0 | – | | – | | 15 | 1 |
| FC Tosno | Total | | 24 | 6 | 1 | 0 | 0 | 0 | 2 | 0 | 27 | 7 |
| FC SKA-Khabarovsk | 2015–16 | FNL | 13 | 2 | – | | – | | – | | 13 | 2 |
| FC Amkar Perm | 2016–17 | Russian Premier League | 13 | 2 | 2 | 0 | – | | – | | 15 | 2 |
| FC Amkar Perm | 2017–18 | Russian Premier League | 9 | 0 | 2 | 2 | – | | – | | 11 | 2 |
| FC Amkar Perm | Total | | 22 | 2 | 4 | 2 | 0 | 0 | 0 | 0 | 26 | 4 |
| Career total | | | 245 | 74 | 14 | 7 | 0 | 0 | 2 | 1 | 261 | 82 |
