= Aleksei Orlov (footballer) =

Russian footballer

Personal information
- Full name: Aleksei Igorevich Orlov
- Date of birth: 24 March 1997 (age 29)
- Place of birth: Omsk, Russia
- Height: 1.76 m (5 ft 9 in)
- Position: Midfielder

Youth career
- –2011: Konoplyov football academy
- 2011–2015: FC Krasnodar

Senior career*
Years	Team	Apps	(Gls)
2013–2015	FC Krasnodar	0	(0)
2015–2016	FC Amkar Perm	0	(0)
2016	FC Irtysh Omsk	10	(1)
2017	FC Sochi	3	(0)
2017–2018	FC Irtysh Omsk	7	(0)
2018–2019	FC Sibir Novosibirsk	6	(0)
2018–2019	→ FC Sibir-2 Novosibirsk	15	(3)
2019–2020	FC Zorky Krasnogorsk	6	(0)
2020–2022	FC Tver	40	(3)
2022–2023	FC SKA-Khabarovsk	2	(0)
2022	→ FC Sokol Saratov (loan)	3	(0)
- * Club domestic league appearances and goals

Aleksei Igorevich Orlov (Russian: Алексей Игоревич Орлов; born 24 March 1997) is a Russian former football player.

== Club career ==
He made his debut in the Russian Professional Football League for FC Irtysh Omsk on 10 August 2016 in a game against FC Dynamo Barnaul.

He made his Russian Football National League debut for FC Sibir Novosibirsk on 3 March 2019 in a game against FC Tyumen.
