= Nikolai Zaytsev =

Russian footballer

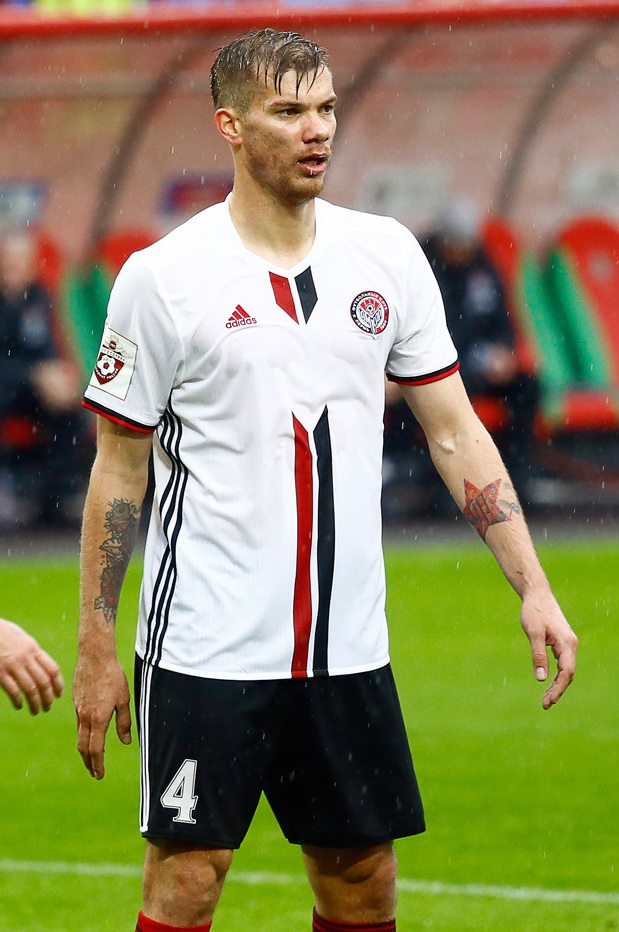
- Zaytsev with Amkar in 2017

Personal information
- Full name: Nikolai Yevgenyevich Zaytsev
- Date of birth: 1 June 1989 (age 37)
- Place of birth: Novorossiysk, Russian SFSR
- Height: 1.91 m (6 ft 3 in)
- Positions: Defender; midfielder

Youth career
- FC Krasnodar-2000

Senior career*
Years	Team	Apps	(Gls)
2006–2007	FC Krasnodar-2000	27	(2)
2007	FC Kuban Krasnodar	1	(0)
2008–2009	PFC CSKA Moscow	0	(0)
2009	→ FC Chernomorets Novorossiysk (loan)	3	(0)
2009–2010	FC Krasnodar-2000	15	(3)
2010	→ FC Neftekhimik Nizhnekamsk (loan)	25	(7)
2011	FC Mordovia Saransk	4	(0)
2011–2012	FC Gazovik Orenburg	10	(0)
2012–2013	FC Volga Nizhny Novgorod	17	(0)
2013	FC Alania Vladikavkaz	11	(0)
2014	FC Neftekhimik Nizhnekamsk	9	(2)
2014–2015	FC Tosno	31	(4)
2015–2018	FC Amkar Perm	63	(2)
2018–2020	FC SKA-Khabarovsk	39	(5)
2020	FC Fakel Voronezh	0	(0)
2020	FC Chernomorets Novorossiysk	0	(0)
2020–2021	FC Fakel Voronezh	18	(1)

International career
2005	Russia U-16	12	(3)
2006	Russia U-17	6	(1)
2007	Russia U-18	7	(0)
2008	Russia U-19	3	(0)
- * Club domestic league appearances and goals

Nikolai Yevgenyevich Zaytsev (Russian: Николай Евгеньевич Зайцев; born 1 June 1989) is a Russian former professional footballer. He played as central midfielder or centre-back.

== Club career ==
He made his debut in the Russian Premier League for FC Kuban Krasnodar on 6 October 2007 in a game against PFC Krylia Sovetov Samara.

== Career statistics ==
=== Club ===
As of 20 May 2018

Club	Season	League			Cup		Continental		Other		Total	
Club	Season	Division	Apps	Goals	Apps	Goals	Apps	Goals	Apps	Goals	Apps	Goals
Krasnodar-2000	2006	PFL	12	0	0	0	–		–		12	0
Krasnodar-2000	2007	PFL	15	2	1	0	–		–		16	2
Kuban Krasnodar	2007	Russian Premier League	1	0	0	0	–		–		1	0
CSKA Moscow	2008	Russian Premier League	0	0	0	0	0	0	–		0	0
Chernomorets Novorossiysk	2009	FNL	3	0	0	0	–		–		3	0
Krasnodar-2000	2009	PFL	15	3	0	0	–		–		15	3
Krasnodar-2000	Total (2 spells)		42	5	1	0	0	0	0	0	43	5
Neftekhimik Nizhnekamsk	2010	PFL	25	7	1	0	–		–		26	7
Mordovia Saransk	2011–12	FNL	4	0	1	0	–		–		5	0
Gazovik Orenburg	2011–12	FNL	10	0	0	0	–		–		10	0
Volga Nizhny Novgorod	2012–13	Russian Premier League	17	0	1	0	–		–		18	0
Volga Nizhny Novgorod	2013–14	Russian Premier League	0	0	–		–		–		0	0
Volga Nizhny Novgorod	Total		17	0	1	0	0	0	0	0	18	0
Alania Vladikavkaz	2013–14	FNL	11	0	2	0	–		–		13	0
Neftekhimik Nizhnekamsk	2013–14	FNL	9	2	–		–		–		9	2
Neftekhimik Nizhnekamsk	Total (2 spells)		34	9	1	0	0	0	0	0	35	9
Tosno	2014–15	FNL	31	4	2	0	–		2 (Note: Two appearances in promotion play-offs)	0	35	4
Amkar Perm	2015–16	Russian Premier League	22	0	3	1	–		–		25	1
Amkar Perm	2016–17	Russian Premier League	27	2	2	0	–		–		29	2
Amkar Perm	2017–18	Russian Premier League	14	0	2	0	–		–		16	0
Amkar Perm	Total		63	2	7	1	0	0	0	0	70	3
Career total			216	20	15	1	0	0	2	0	233	21
