= Oleh Mishchenko =

Ukrainian footballer

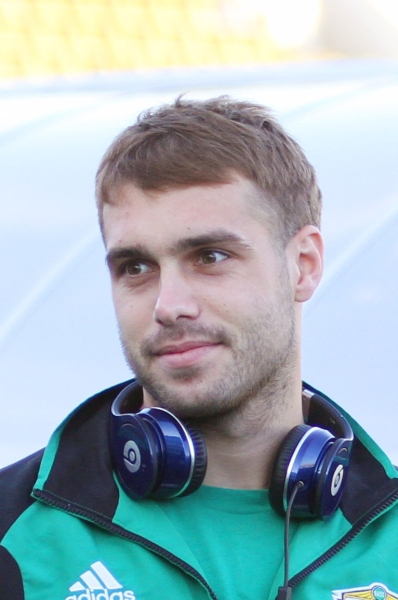

Personal information
- Full name: Oleh Volodymyrovych Mishchenko
- Date of birth: 10 October 1989 (age 37)
- Place of birth: Kyiv, Ukrainian SSR
- Height: 1.80 m (5 ft 11 in)
- Positions: Forward; midfielder

Youth career
- 2002–2006: Dynamo Kyiv

Senior career*
Years	Team	Apps	(Gls)
2006	Dynamo-3 Kyiv	3	(0)
2006–2007	Dynamo-2 Kyiv	13	(0)
2008–2013	Metalurh Donetsk	3	(0)
2008	→ Stal Alchevsk (loan)	18	(3)
2011	→ Hoverla-Zakarpattia Uzhhorod (loan)	17	(5)
2012–2013	→ Hoverla Uzhhorod (loan)	14	(3)
2013–2015	Vorskla Poltava	44	(7)
2016–2017	Amkar Perm	1	(0)
2016	→ Illichivets Mariupol (loan)	6	(1)
2018	Polissya Zhytomyr	6	(1)

International career
2004	Ukraine-15	1	(0)
2004–2005	Ukraine-16	14	(2)
2005–2006	Ukraine-17	11	(0)
2006–2007	Ukraine-18	13	(5)
2007–2008	Ukraine-19	4	(1)
- * Club domestic league appearances and goals

Oleh Volodymyrovych Mishchenko (Ukrainian: Олег Володимирович Міщенко, born 10 October 1989) is a Ukrainian former professional football midfielder.

== Career ==
He is a product of the FC Dynamo Kyiv sportive school.

Mishchenko was loaned several times to different Ukrainian clubs, including FC Zakarpattia Uzhhorod in the Ukrainian Premier League.

On 9 February 2016, he moved to the Russian Premier League, signing a contract with FC Amkar Perm. Amkar released him from his contract on 2 June 2017.
