= Andrei Pridyuk =

Russian footballer

Personal information
- Full name: Andrei Anatolyevich Pridyuk
- Date of birth: 25 February 1994 (age 32)
- Place of birth: Krasnokamsk, Russia
- Height: 1.80 m (5 ft 11 in)
- Position: Defender

Team information
- Current team: Amkar Perm
- Number: 45

Senior career*
Years	Team	Apps	(Gls)
2012–2016	Amkar Perm	2	(0)
2014–2015	→ Tambov (loan)	28	(1)
2016–2018	Chayka Peschanokopskoye	44	(2)
2018–2022	Zvezda Perm	76	(3)
2022–2023	Amkar Perm	10	(0)
2023–2024	Uralets-TS Nizhny Tagil	16	(1)
2024–	Amkar Perm	45	(0)

International career
2013	Russia U-19	4	(0)
2014	Russia U-21	2	(0)
- * Club domestic league appearances and goals as of 17 October 2026

Andrei Anatolyevich Pridyuk (Russian: Андрей Анатольевич Придюк; born 25 February 1994) is a Russian professional football player who plays for Amkar Perm.

== Club career ==
He made his debut in the Russian Premier League on 23 November 2013 for Amkar Perm in a game against Kuban Krasnodar.
