= Ivan Belikov (footballer, born 1996) =

Russian football player

Personal information
- Full name: Ivan Aleksandrovich Belikov
- Date of birth: 4 December 1996 (age 29)
- Place of birth: Moscow, Russia
- Height: 1.73 m (5 ft 8 in)
- Position: Midfielder

Youth career
- –2011: SDYuSShOR-63 Smena Moscow
- 2011–2014: CSKA Moscow
- 2014–2015: Shkola Myacha Moscow

Senior career*
Years	Team	Apps	(Gls)
2015–2017	Amkar Perm	0	(0)
2016	→ Lokomotiv Liski (loan)	7	(0)
2016	→ Afips Afipsky (loan)	12	(0)
2017	→ Naftan Novopolotsk (loan)	8	(0)
2017	Khimki	10	(0)
2018	Sakhalin Yuzhno-Sakhalinsk	8	(0)
2018	Fakel Voronezh	7	(0)
2019–2020	Khimik-Arsenal	18	(0)
2020–2021	Kyzyltash Bakhchisaray	18	(1)

International career
2011	Russia U-16	3	(0)
2014	Russia U-18	6	(0)
- * Club domestic league appearances and goals

Ivan Aleksandrovich Belikov (Russian: Иван Александрович Беликов; born 4 December 1996) is a Russian former football player.

== Club career ==
He made his debut in the Russian Professional Football League for FC Lokomotiv Liski on 10 April 2016 in a game against FC Arsenal-2 Tula.

He made his Russian Football National League debut for FC Khimki on 15 July 2017 in a game against FC Kuban Krasnodar.
