= Syarhey Balanovich =

Belarusian professional footballer

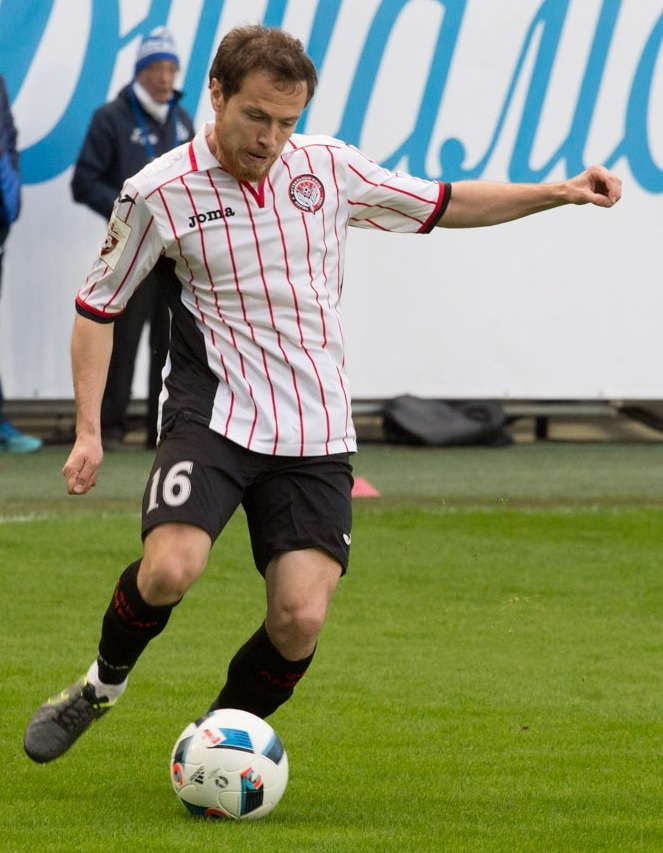
- Balanovich with Amkar in 2016

Personal information
- Full name: Syarhey Mikhailavich Balanovich
- Date of birth: 29 August 1987 (age 39)
- Place of birth: Pinsk, Brest Oblast, Byelorussian SSR, Soviet Union
- Height: 1.71 m (5 ft 7 in)
- Position: Midfielder

Team information
- Current team: Maxline Vitebsk
- Number: 23

Youth career
- SDYuShOR-3 Pinsk

Senior career*
Years	Team	Apps	(Gls)
2004–2007	Volna Pinsk	66	(14)
2008–2014	Shakhtyor Soligorsk	171	(21)
2014–2018	Amkar Perm	88	(0)
2018–2020	Shakhtyor Soligorsk	59	(7)
2021	Akron Tolyatti	12	(0)
2021	Slutsk	10	(0)
2022–	Maxline Vitebsk	120	(1)

International career^{‡}
2006–2009	Belarus U21	16	(0)
2012–2018	Belarus	33	(2)

Managerial career
- 2026: Maxline Vitebsk (caretaker)
- * Club domestic league appearances and goals as of 4 July 2026 ‡ National team caps and goals as of 18 November 2018

Syarhey Mikhailavich Balanovich (Belarusian: Сяргей Міхайлавіч Балановіч; Russian: Серге́й Михайлович Баланович; born 29 August 1987) is a Belarusian professional footballer. He plays as a left winger for Maxline Vitebsk.

== International ==
Balanovich made his debut for the senior national team of his country on 7 June 2012, in the 1–1 draw with Lithuania in a friendly match. He scored his first goal on 14 November 2012 in a 2–1 home win friendly against Israel.

== Career statistics ==
=== Club ===
As of match played 20 May 2018

Club	Season	League			Cup		Continental		Other		Total	
Club	Season	Division	Apps	Goals	Apps	Goals	Apps	Goals	Apps	Goals	Apps	Goals
Volna Pinsk	2004	Belarusian Second League	2	0	0	0	–		–		2	0
Volna Pinsk	2005	Belarusian Second League	19	5	1	0	–		–		20	5
Volna Pinsk	2006	Belarusian First League	24	3	1	0	–		–		25	3
Volna Pinsk	2007	Belarusian First League	21	6	2	1	–		–		23	7
Volna Pinsk	Total		66	14	4	1	0	0	-	-	70	15
Shakhtyor Soligorsk	2008	Belarusian Premier League	20	3	6	0	2	0	–		28	3
Shakhtyor Soligorsk	2009	Belarusian Premier League	23	3	6	0	–		–		29	3
Shakhtyor Soligorsk	2010	Belarusian Premier League	29	5	6	1	–		–		35	6
Shakhtyor Soligorsk	2011	Belarusian Premier League	28	3	6	0	2	0	–		36	3
Shakhtyor Soligorsk	2012	Belarusian Premier League	29	3	1	0	2	0	–		32	3
Shakhtyor Soligorsk	2013	Belarusian Premier League	25	3	2	1	2	0	–		29	4
Shakhtyor Soligorsk	2014	Belarusian Premier League	17	1	3	0	4	3	–		24	4
Shakhtyor Soligorsk	Total		171	21	30	2	12	3	-	-	213	26
Amkar Perm	2014–15	Russian Premier League	24	0	1	0	–		–		25	0
Amkar Perm	2015–16	Russian Premier League	26	0	4	2	–		–		30	2
Amkar Perm	2016–17	Russian Premier League	22	0	0	0	–		–		22	0
Amkar Perm	2017–18	Russian Premier League	16	0	2	0	–		2 (Note: Two appearances in relegation play-offs)	1	20	1
Amkar Perm	Total		88	0	7	2	0	0	2	1	97	3
Career total			325	35	41	5	12	3	2	1	380	44

=== International ===
As of match played 7 October 2017.

Belarus
Year	Apps	Goals
2012	5	1
2013	11	1
2014	7	0
2015	0	0
2016	2	0
2017	5	0
2018	0	0
Total	30	2

=== International goals ===
Scores and results list Belarus' goal tally first.

#	Date	Venue	Opponent	Score	Result	Competition	Ref.
1.	14 November 2012	Teddy Stadium, Jerusalem, Israel	Israel	2–1	2–1	Friendly	
2.	6 September 2013	Dinamo Stadium, Minsk, Belarus	Kyrgyzstan	1–0	3–1	Friendly	

== Honours ==
Shakhtyor Soligorsk

- Belarusian Premier League champion: 2020
- Belarusian Cup winner: 2013–14, 2018–19
