= Alikhan Shavayev =

Russian footballer

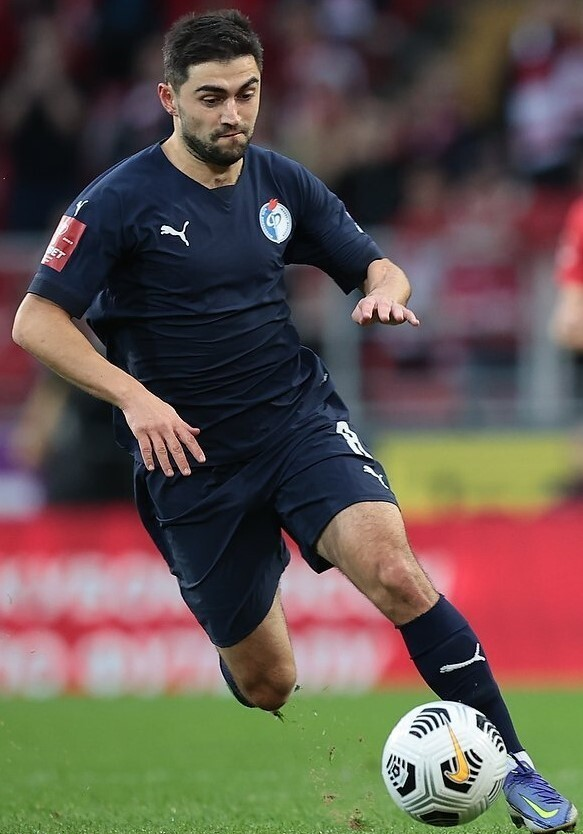
- Shavayev with Fakel in 2022

Personal information
- Full name: Alikhan Aslanovich Shavayev
- Date of birth: 5 January 1993 (age 33)
- Place of birth: Nalchik, Russia
- Height: 1.76 m (5 ft 9 in)
- Position: Midfielder

Senior career*
| Years | Team | Apps | (Gls) |
| 2011–2014 | PFC Spartak Nalchik | 32 | (5) |
| 2014–2018 | FC Amkar Perm | 32 | (4) |
| 2018–2021 | FC Baltika Kaliningrad | 88 | (5) |
| 2021–2022 | FC Fakel Voronezh | 30 | (2) |
| 2023 | FC Rotor Volgograd | 10 | (0) |
| 2023–2025 | FC Ufa | 30 | (1) |
| 2025–2026 | FC KDV Tomsk | 10 | (0) |
- * Club domestic league appearances and goals as of 19 April 2026

Alikhan Aslanovich Shavayev (Russian: Алихан Асланович Шаваев; born 5 January 1993) is a Russian professional footballer who plays as a central midfielder.

== Club career ==
He made his debut in the Russian National Football League for PFC Spartak Nalchik on 6 August 2012 in a game against FC Ural Sverdlovsk Oblast.

He made his Russian Premier League debut for FC Amkar Perm on 23 August 2014 in a game against FC Zenit Saint Petersburg.

On 5 December 2022, Shavayev's contract with FC Fakel Voronezh was terminated by mutual consent.

== Personal life ==
He is the younger brother of Amirkhan Shavayev.

== Career statistics ==
=== Club ===
As of 27 November 2022

| Club | Season | League | | | Cup | | Continental | | Total | |
| Club | Season | Division | Apps | Goals | Apps | Goals | Apps | Goals | Apps | Goals |
|---|---|---|---|---|---|---|---|---|---|---|
| Spartak Nalchik | 2011–12 | RPL | 0 | 0 | 1 | 0 | – | | 1 | 0 |
| Spartak Nalchik | 2012–13 | FNL | 5 | 0 | 1 | 0 | – | | 6 | 0 |
| Spartak Nalchik | 2013–14 | FNL | 27 | 5 | 1 | 1 | – | | 28 | 6 |
| Spartak Nalchik | Total | | 32 | 5 | 3 | 1 | 0 | 0 | 35 | 6 |
| Amkar Perm | 2014–15 | RPL | 5 | 0 | 0 | 0 | – | | 5 | 0 |
| Amkar Perm | 2015–16 | RPL | 17 | 4 | 4 | 1 | – | | 21 | 5 |
| Amkar Perm | 2016–17 | RPL | 5 | 0 | 1 | 0 | – | | 6 | 0 |
| Amkar Perm | 2017–18 | RPL | 5 | 0 | 1 | 0 | – | | 6 | 0 |
| Amkar Perm | Total | | 32 | 4 | 6 | 1 | 0 | 0 | 38 | 5 |
| Baltika Kaliningrad | 2018–19 | FNL | 27 | 2 | 2 | 0 | – | | 29 | 2 |
| Baltika Kaliningrad | 2019–20 | FNL | 22 | 2 | 1 | 0 | – | | 23 | 2 |
| Baltika Kaliningrad | 2020–21 | FNL | 39 | 1 | 1 | 0 | – | | 40 | 1 |
| Baltika Kaliningrad | Total | | 88 | 5 | 4 | 0 | 0 | 0 | 92 | 5 |
| Fakel Voronezh | 2021–22 | FNL | 21 | 2 | 2 | 0 | – | | 23 | 2 |
| Fakel Voronezh | 2022–23 | RPL | 9 | 0 | 5 | 0 | – | | 14 | 0 |
| Fakel Voronezh | Total | | 30 | 2 | 7 | 0 | 0 | 0 | 37 | 2 |
| Career total | | | 182 | 16 | 20 | 2 | 0 | 0 | 202 | 18 |
