= Aleksandr Pantsyrev =

Russian footballer

Personal information
- Full name: Aleksandr Sergeyevich Pantsyrev
- Date of birth: 8 December 1993 (age 32)
- Place of birth: Kazan, Russia
- Height: 1.78 m (5 ft 10 in)
- Position: Midfielder

Youth career
- FC Rubin Kazan

Senior career*
Years	Team	Apps	(Gls)
2012–2016	FC Amkar Perm	2	(0)
2014	→ FC Oktan Perm (loan)	8	(3)
2014–2015	→ FC Neftekhimik Nizhnekamsk (loan)	17	(0)
2017	FC Chayka Peschanokopskoye	14	(0)
2017	FC Olimpiyets Nizhny Novgorod	0	(0)
2017	FC KAMAZ Naberezhnye Chelny	11	(1)
2018	FC Chayka Peschanokopskoye	10	(0)
2020–2023	FC Nefis Kazan (amateur)		
2023	FC Rubin-2 Kazan	3	(0)

International career
2014	Russia U-21	6	(0)
- * Club domestic league appearances and goals

Aleksandr Sergeyevich Pantsyrev (Russian: Александр Сергеевич Панцырев; born 8 December 1993) is a Russian former football player.

== Club career ==
He made his professional debut in the Russian Professional Football League for FC Oktan Perm on 18 April 2014 in a game against FC Chelyabinsk.

Pantsyrev made his Russian Premier League debut for FC Amkar Perm on 24 October 2015 against FC Ural Yekaterinburg.
