= Pavel Komolov =

Russian footballer

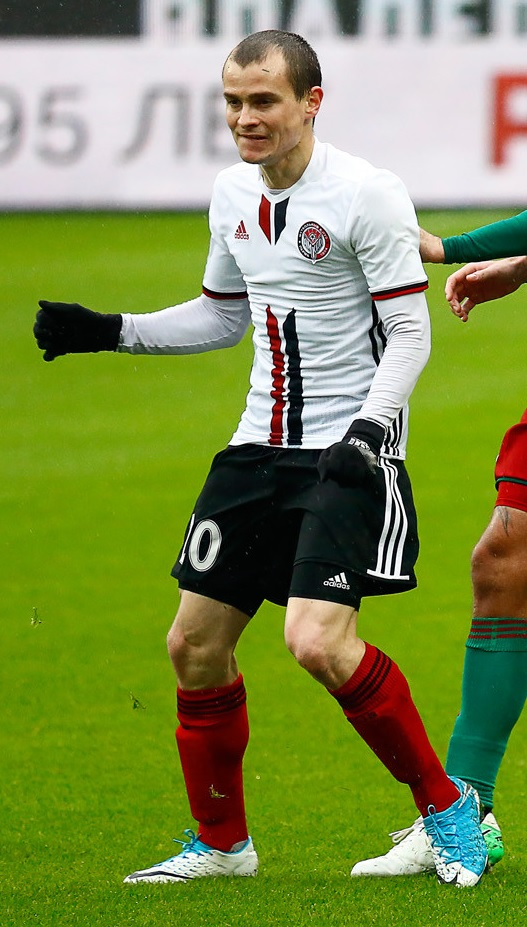
- Komolov with Amkar in 2017

Personal information
- Full name: Pavel Dmitriyevich Komolov
- Date of birth: 10 March 1989 (age 37)
- Place of birth: Leningrad, Soviet Union
- Height: 1.78 m (5 ft 10 in)
- Position: Midfielder

Youth career
- DYuSSh Smena-Zenit

Senior career*
Years	Team	Apps	(Gls)
2006–2009	Zenit Saint Petersburg	0	(0)
2010–2015	Žalgiris Vilnius	92	(17)
2011	→ GKS Bełchatów (loan)	10	(0)
2014	→ Veria (loan)	6	(0)
2014–2015	→ GKS Bełchatów (loan)	31	(2)
2015–2018	Amkar Perm	68	(2)
2018–2019	Yenisey Krasnoyarsk	22	(1)
2019–2021	Nizhny Novgorod	48	(1)

International career
2008	Russia U19	8	(2)
2009	Russia U20	6	(1)
- * Club domestic league appearances and goals

Pavel Dmitriyevich Komolov (Russian: Павел Дмитриевич Комолов; born 10 March 1989) is a Russian former professional footballer. His positions were right winger, left midfielder and central midfielder.

== Career ==
=== Club ===
In January 2011, he was loaned to GKS Bełchatów from Žalgiris Vilnius on a half-year deal. He returned half year later. Three years later, he was loaned to Veria, after that he returned to Žalgiris Vilnius but then he was loaned again to GKS Bełchatów on a half-year deal.

He made his Russian Premier League debut for FC Amkar Perm on 20 July 2015 in a game against FC Krasnodar.

On 14 June 2018, he signed a two-year contract with FC Yenisey Krasnoyarsk.

=== International ===
He was a part of Russia national under-20 football team.

== Career statistics ==
=== Club ===
As of 20 May 2018

Club	Season	League			Cup		Continental		Other		Total	
Club	Season	Division	Apps	Goals	Apps	Goals	Apps	Goals	Apps	Goals	Apps	Goals
Zenit St. Petersburg	2006	Russian Premier League	0	0	0	0	0	0	–		0	0
Zenit St. Petersburg	2007	Russian Premier League	0	0	0	0	0	0	–		0	0
Zenit St. Petersburg	2008	Russian Premier League	0	0	0	0	0	0	–		0	0
Zenit St. Petersburg	2009	Russian Premier League	0	0	0	0	0	0	–		0	0
Zenit St. Petersburg	Total		0	0	0	0	0	0	0	0	0	0
Žalgiris	2010	A Lyga	27	5	0	0	–		–		27	5
Žalgiris	2011	A Lyga	4	0	0	0	–		–		4	0
Žalgiris	2012	A Lyga	32	6	2	1	2	0	–		36	7
Žalgiris	2013	A Lyga	29	6	6	1	8	1	1 (Note: One appearance in Lithuanian Supercup)	0	44	8
Žalgiris	2014	A Lyga	0	0	0	0	1	0	–		1	0
Žalgiris	Total		92	17	8	2	11	1	1	0	112	20
GKS Bełchatów (loan)	2010–11	Ekstraklasa	10	0	–		–		–		10	0
Veria (loan)	2013–14	Super League Greece	6	0	–		–		–		6	0
GKS Bełchatów (loan)	2014–15	Ekstraklasa	31	2	1	0	–		–		32	2
Amkar Perm	2015–16	Russian Premier League	17	1	2	0	–		–		19	1
Amkar Perm	2016–17	Russian Premier League	28	0	1	0	–		–		29	0
Amkar Perm	2017–18	Russian Premier League	23	1	1	0	–		2 (Note: Two appearances in relegation play-offs)	0	26	1
Amkar Perm	Total		68	2	4	0	0	0	2	0	74	2
Career total			207	21	13	2	11	1	3	0	234	24
