= Zvezda Stadium =

Football stadium in Perm, Russia

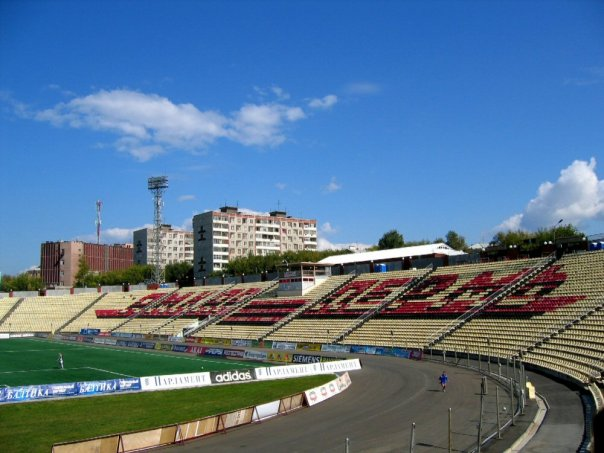
- Interactive map of Zvezda Stadium
- Former names: Lenin Komsomol Stadium
- Location: Perm, Russia
- Coordinates: 57°59′26.50″N 56°14′40.69″E
- Capacity: 17,000
- Surface: artificial turf

Construction
- Opened: June 5, 1969

Tenant
- FC Zvezda Perm FC Amkar Perm FC Zvezda-2005 Perm

Zvezda Stadium (Russian: «Звезда»), until 1991 Lenin Komsomol Stadium (Russian: стадион имени Ленинского комсомола), is a multi-use stadium in Perm, Russia. It is currently used mostly for football matches and is the home ground of Amkar Perm, Zvezda Perm and a women's club Zvezda-2005 Perm. The stadium holds 17,000 people and was opened on June 5, 1969.

== History ==
The stadium opened its doors on June 5, 1969 with a match between Zvezda Perm and Sokol Saratov.

The field was covered with artificial turf in 2005.

On August 3rd, 2009 the stadium received the UEFA Certification "Quality Concept Football Turf - 2 stars", which lets the stadium host international matches up to the UEFA Europa League quarterfinals and Round of 16 of UEFA Champions League.

On August 27th, 2009 it hosted its first ever Europa League match, a qualification game between Amkar Perm and Fulham F.C., that finished with the Russian team's victory - 1:0. The only goal was scored by Martin Kushev.

In 2015 one of the stadium's sectors - number 14 - was named in honour of Zahari Sirakov, a former FC Amkar Perm player, who played for 12 years for the club.
