= David Dzakhov =

Russian professional footballer

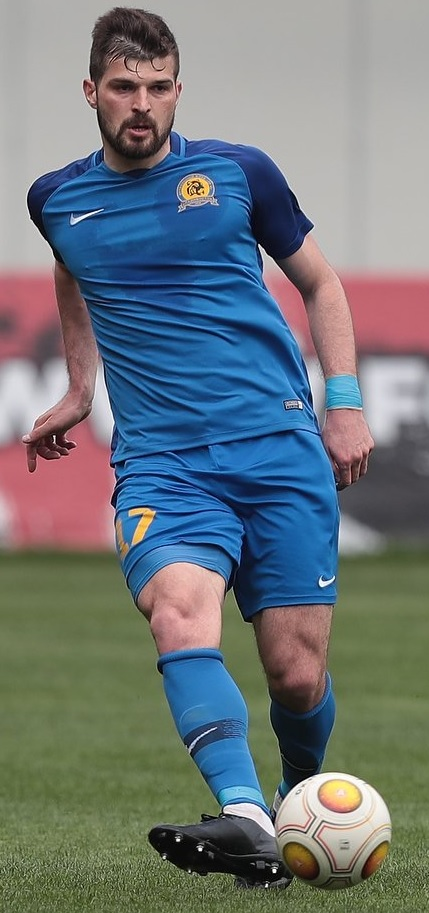
- Dzakhov with Luch Vladivostok in 2019

Personal information
- Full name: David Yuryevich Dzakhov
- Date of birth: 6 October 1988 (age 38)
- Place of birth: Ordzhonikidze, Russian SFSR
- Height: 1.85 m (6 ft 1 in)
- Position: Midfielder

Youth career
- PFC CSKA Moscow

Senior career*
Years	Team	Apps	(Gls)
2009–2010	FC Amkar Perm	1	(0)
2010	→ FC Volgar-Gazprom Astrakhan (loan)	27	(1)
2011–2014	FC Neftekhimik Nizhnekamsk	80	(13)
2014–2017	FC Amkar Perm	19	(1)
2016–2017	→ FC Shinnik Yaroslavl (loan)	23	(3)
2017	FC Orenburg	8	(0)
2018–2019	FC Luch Vladivostok	43	(1)
2019–2020	FC Tyumen	14	(3)
2020–2024	FC Alania Vladikavkaz	36	(0)
2024	FC Alania-2 Vladikavkaz	18	(2)

International career
2006	Russia U-18	6	(2)
- * Club domestic league appearances and goals

David Yuryevich Dzakhov (Russian: Давид Юрьевич Дзахов; born 6 October 1988) is a Russian former professional footballer.

== Club career ==
He made his debut in the Russian Premier League on 26 April 2009 for FC Amkar Perm.

After his contract with FC Amkar Perm expired in summer of 2015, he took half a year away from professional football, before rejoining Amkar in January 2016.
