= Aleksandr Salugin =

Russian footballer

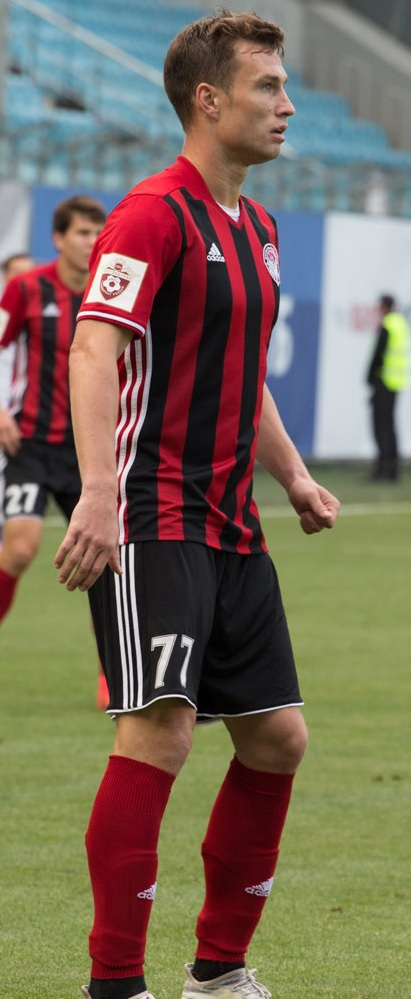
- Salugin with Amkar in 2017

Personal information
- Full name: Aleksandr Sergeyevich Salugin
- Date of birth: 23 October 1988 (age 38)
- Place of birth: Moscow, Russian SFSR
- Height: 1.86 m (6 ft 1 in)
- Position: Forward

Youth career
- 1996–2002: Krasny Oktyabr Moscow
- 2002–2004: CSKA Moscow

Senior career*
| Years | Team | Apps | (Gls) |
| 2005–2007 | CSKA Moscow | 10 | (1) |
| 2007 | → Tekstilshchik-Telekom Ivanovo (loan) | 30 | (4) |
| 2008–2010 | Krylia Sovetov Samara | 21 | (0) |
| 2009 | → Rostov (loan) | 6 | (0) |
| 2010–2013 | Volga Nizhny Novgorod | 17 | (1) |
| 2011–2012 | → Nizhny Novgorod (loan) | 39 | (9) |
| 2013–2015 | Torpedo Moscow | 35 | (4) |
| 2015–2018 | Amkar Perm | 42 | (4) |
| 2018 | Torpedo-BelAZ Zhodino | 8 | (0) |
| 2019 | Nizhny Novgorod | 27 | (2) |

International career
| 2006 | Russia U-18 | 14 | (6) |
| 2007 | Russia U-19 | 11 | (3) |
| 2006–2009 | Russia U-21 | 8 | (3) |
- * Club domestic league appearances and goals

Aleksandr Sergeyevich Salugin (Russian: Александр Серге́евич Салугин; born 23 October 1988) is a Russian former footballer who played as a forward.

== Club career ==
He made his professional debut for PFC CSKA Moscow on 5 May 2005 in a return leg of the UEFA Cup semifinal against Parma, substituting Vágner Love in the 88th minute. CSKA eventually won the cup, Salugin did not appear in the final.

He made his Russian Premier League debut for CSKA on 18 September 2005 in a game against FC Saturn Ramenskoye.

Until 18 October 2009, he was the youngest player ever to score a goal in the Russian Premier League (he scored a goal for PFC CSKA Moscow on 19 November 2005 in a game against FC Alania Vladikavkaz when he was 17 years 27 days old). That record was surpassed by Zhano Ananidze.

== Career statistics ==
=== Club ===
As of 20 May 2018

| Club | Season | League | | | Cup | | Continental | | Other | | Total | |
| Club | Season | Division | Apps | Goals | Apps | Goals | Apps | Goals | Apps | Goals | Apps | Goals |
|---|---|---|---|---|---|---|---|---|---|---|---|---|
| PFC CSKA Moscow | 2005 | Russian Premier League | 5 | 1 | 0 | 0 | 4 | 0 | – | | 9 | 1 |
| PFC CSKA Moscow | 2006 | Russian Premier League | 5 | 0 | 2 | 1 | 0 | 0 | – | | 7 | 1 |
| PFC CSKA Moscow | 2007 | Russian Premier League | 0 | 0 | 0 | 0 | 0 | 0 | – | | 0 | 0 |
| PFC CSKA Moscow | Total | | 10 | 1 | 2 | 1 | 4 | 0 | 0 | 0 | 16 | 2 |
| FC Tekstilshchik-Telekom Ivanovo | 2007 | FNL | 30 | 4 | 0 | 0 | – | | – | | 30 | 4 |
| FC Krylia Sovetov Samara | 2008 | Russian Premier League | 17 | 0 | 2 | 0 | – | | – | | 19 | 0 |
| FC Krylia Sovetov Samara | 2009 | Russian Premier League | 0 | 0 | 0 | 0 | – | | – | | 0 | 0 |
| FC Rostov | 2009 | Russian Premier League | 6 | 0 | 0 | 0 | – | | – | | 6 | 0 |
| FC Krylia Sovetov Samara | 2010 | Russian Premier League | 4 | 0 | 0 | 0 | – | | – | | 4 | 0 |
| FC Krylia Sovetov Samara | Total (2 spells) | | 21 | 0 | 2 | 0 | 0 | 0 | 0 | 0 | 23 | 0 |
| FC Volga Nizhny Novgorod | 2010 | FNL | 1 | 0 | 0 | 0 | – | | – | | 1 | 0 |
| FC Nizhny Novgorod | 2011–12 | FNL | 39 | 9 | 2 | 0 | – | | 2 (Note: Two appearances in promotion play-offs) | 1 | 43 | 10 |
| FC Volga Nizhny Novgorod | 2012–13 | Russian Premier League | 16 | 1 | 1 | 0 | – | | – | | 17 | 1 |
| FC Volga Nizhny Novgorod | Total (2 spells) | | 17 | 1 | 1 | 0 | 0 | 0 | 0 | 0 | 18 | 1 |
| FC Torpedo Moscow | 2013–14 | FNL | 17 | 3 | 0 | 0 | – | | 2 (Note: Two appearances in promotion play-offs) | 1 | 19 | 4 |
| FC Torpedo Moscow | 2014–15 | Russian Premier League | 18 | 1 | 1 | 1 | – | | – | | 19 | 2 |
| FC Torpedo Moscow | Total | | 35 | 4 | 1 | 1 | 0 | 0 | 2 | 1 | 38 | 6 |
| FC Amkar Perm | 2015–16 | Russian Premier League | 20 | 3 | 2 | 0 | – | | – | | 22 | 3 |
| FC Amkar Perm | 2016–17 | Russian Premier League | 17 | 1 | 0 | 0 | – | | – | | 17 | 1 |
| FC Amkar Perm | 2017–18 | Russian Premier League | 5 | 0 | 0 | 0 | – | | – | | 5 | 0 |
| FC Amkar Perm | Total | | 42 | 4 | 2 | 0 | 0 | 0 | 0 | 0 | 44 | 4 |
| Career total | | | 200 | 23 | 10 | 2 | 4 | 0 | 4 | 2 | 218 | 27 |
