= Roman Gerus =

Russian footballer

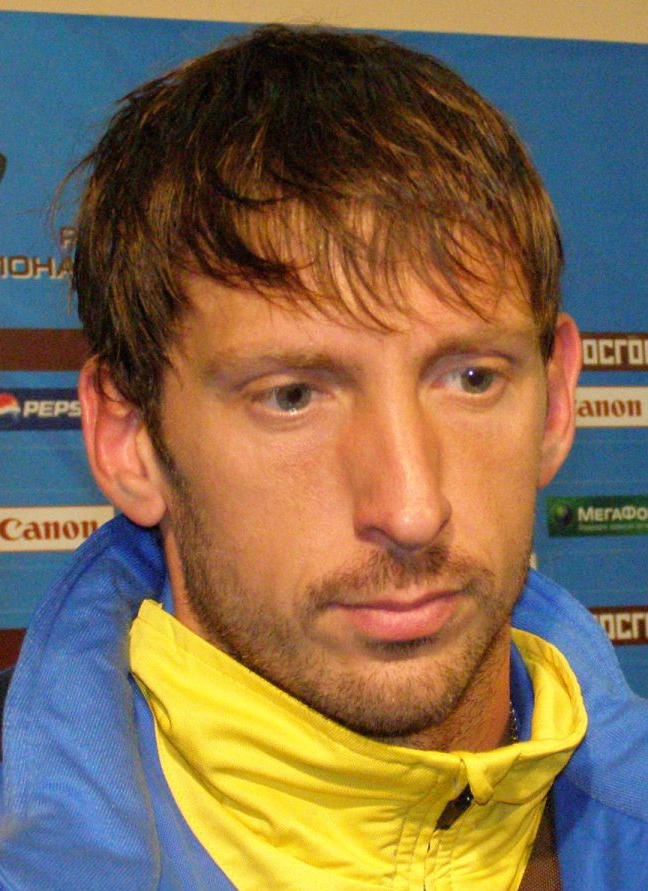
- Roman Gerus in 2009

Personal information
- Full name: Roman Vladimirovich Gerus
- Date of birth: 14 September 1980 (age 46)
- Place of birth: Tikhoretsk, Russian SFSR
- Height: 1.92 m (6 ft 4 in)
- Position: Goalkeeper

Senior career*
Years	Team	Apps	(Gls)
1997	FC Trud Tikhoretsk	5	(0)
1998–2000	FC Venets Gulkevichi	49	(0)
2001–2003	FC Chernomorets Novorossiysk	47	(0)
2004–2006	FC Luch-Energiya Vladivostok	67	(0)
2007–2009	FC Rostov	78	(0)
2010	FC Lokomotiv Astana	23	(0)
2011	FC Dynamo Bryansk	23	(0)
2012–2016	FC Amkar Perm	56	(0)
2016	FC Arsenal Tula	3	(0)
- * Club domestic league appearances and goals

Roman Vladimirovich Gerus (Russian: Роман Владимирович Герус; born 14 September 1980) is a former Russian footballer.

== Career ==
He made his debut in the Russian Premier League in 2001 for FC Chernomorets Novorossiysk.
