= Kstovo (inhabited locality) =

Kstovo (Russian: Кстово) is the name of several inhabited localities in Russia.

Urban localities

- Kstovo, a town in Kstovsky District of Nizhny Novgorod Oblast; administratively incorporated as a town of district significance

Rural localities

- Kstovo, Arkhangelsk Oblast, a village in Moshinsky Selsoviet of Nyandomsky District of Arkhangelsk Oblast
- Kstovo, Kostroma Oblast, a village in Kotovskoye Settlement of Kostromskoy District of Kostroma Oblast
- Kstovo, Pskov Oblast, a village in Pustoshkinsky District of Pskov Oblast
- Kstovo, Vologda Oblast, a village in Soshnevsky Selsoviet of Ustyuzhensky District of Vologda Oblast
- Kstovo, Nekrasovsky District, Yaroslavl Oblast, a village in Nikolsky Rural Okrug of Nekrasovsky District of Yaroslavl Oblast
- Kstovo, Rybinsky District, Yaroslavl Oblast, a settlement in Pokrovsky Rural Okrug of Rybinsky District of Yaroslavl Oblast
