= Veliky Vrag =

Veliky Vrag (Russian: Великий Враг, lit. 'Great Enemy') is the name of several rural localities in Nizhny Novgorod Oblast, Russia:

- Veliky Vrag, Kstovsky District, Nizhny Novgorod Oblast, a selo in Bezvodninsky Selsoviet of Kstovsky District
- Veliky Vrag, Shatkovsky District, Nizhny Novgorod Oblast, a selo in Staroivantsevsky Selsoviet of Shatkovsky District
