= Kudma =

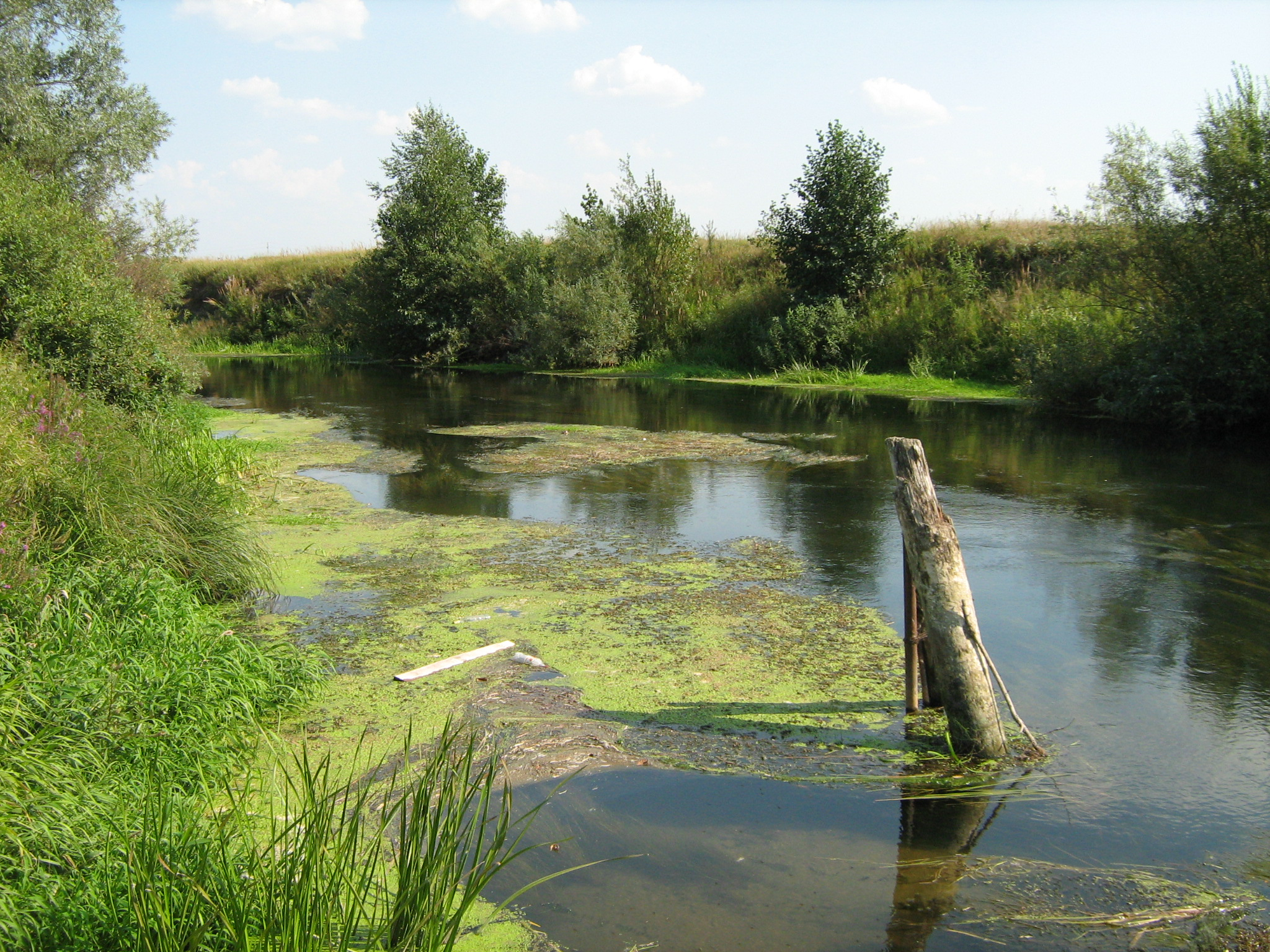
- On the Kudma at Zelyony Gorod
- Native name: Кудьма (Russian)

Location
- Country: Russia

Physical characteristics
- Mouth: Volga
  - coordinates: 56.0594°N 44.5389°E
- Length: 144 km (89 mi)
- Basin size: 3,220 km^{2} (1,240 sq mi)

Basin features
- Progression: Volga→ Caspian Sea

The Kudma (Russian: Кудьма, Kud'ma) is a river in Nizhny Novgorod Oblast of Russia, a right tributary of the Volga. It is 144 kilometres (89 mi) long, and has a drainage basin of 3,220 square kilometres (1,240 sq mi).

The Kudma rises in the south of Bogorodsk District, and flows first northward, then eastward, through Bogorodsk and Kstovo Districts, finally falling into the Volga near Leninskaya Sloboda and Kadnitsy. In Kstovo District, the Kudma forms the southern border of the Zelyony Gorod natural area, and then flows in the valley between the city of Kstovo (to the north) and Kstovo's industrial area to the south. Upstream of Kstovo, the river's waters are quite clean and transparent, and its shores attract many swimmers and sunbathers in the summertime.
