= M7 highway (Russia) =

Federal highway in Russia

Federal Highway M7
- Федеральная автомобильная дорога М7
- Volga Highway
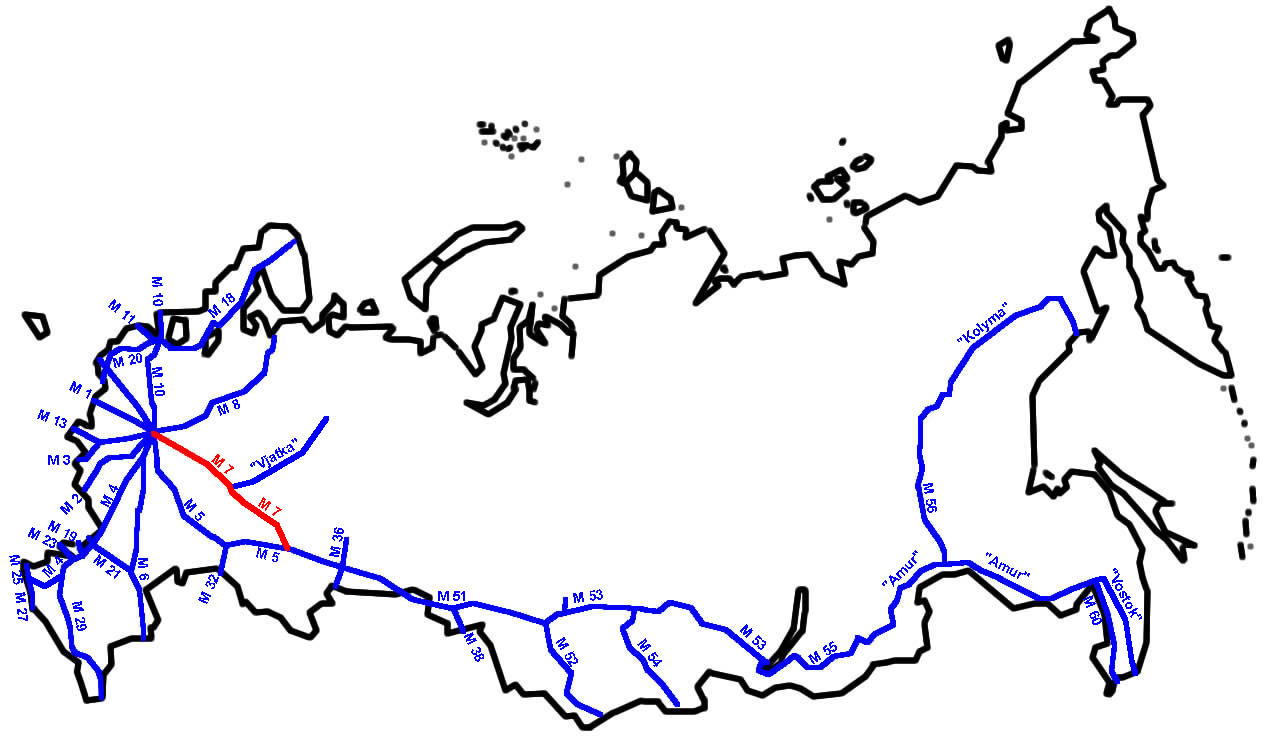

Route information
- Part of E22 E017
- Length: 1,342 km (834 mi)

Major junctions
- West end: MKAD in Moscow
- East end: R240 in Ufa

Location
- Country: Russia

Highway system
- Russian Federal Highways
← M 5	→ M 8

The Russian Route M7 (also known as the Volga Highway) is a major trunk road running from Moscow through Vladimir and Nizhny Novgorod to Kazan in Tatarstan, formerly continue to Ufa in Bashkortostan. It generally follows the route of the historic Vladimirka road and, to a large extent, forms part of the European route E22. The section from Yelabuga to Ufa is also part of European route E017.

On 1 November 2023, Russian Federal Government announced to shorten the M7 highway to Kazan, by 31 December 2024. The cut section will be altered to parts of M12 from Shali, Kazan to Diltuli; R240 from Diltuli to Ufa; and R243 for the branch section to either Izhevsk or Perm.

== Major junctions ==
Federal subject	District	Location	km	Destinations	Notes
Moscow			16	Moscow Ring Road	Interchange
Moscow Oblast		Obukhovo	43	R 109 – Losino-Petrovsky, Monino, Elektrougli	Interchange is under construction
	Bogorodsky		53	A 107 – Elektrostal, Noginsk	Interchange
			62	A 113 – [[|]]	Interchange
			84	A 108 – Sergiyev Posad	Interchange
Vladimir Oblast	Sobinsky		165	17A-2 – Koloksha, Dvoriki	
	Sudogodsky		189	R 132 / 17R-1 – Vladimir, Gus-Khrustalny, Murom, Diveyevo	Interchange
	Kovrovsky		246	17K-1 – Seninskiye Dvoriki, Kovrov, Shuya, Kineshma	
	Gorokhovetsky		324	17K-2 – Murom, Muromsky Zakaznik	
Nizhny Novgorod Oblast		Dzerzhinsk	399	22K-0101 – Nizhny Novgorod	Interchange
			?	22N-5018 – Strigino Airport	Interchange
			?	R 158 – Nizhny Novgorod, Arzamas, Saransk	
			?	22K-0007	
			472	22K-0162	

== Route ==
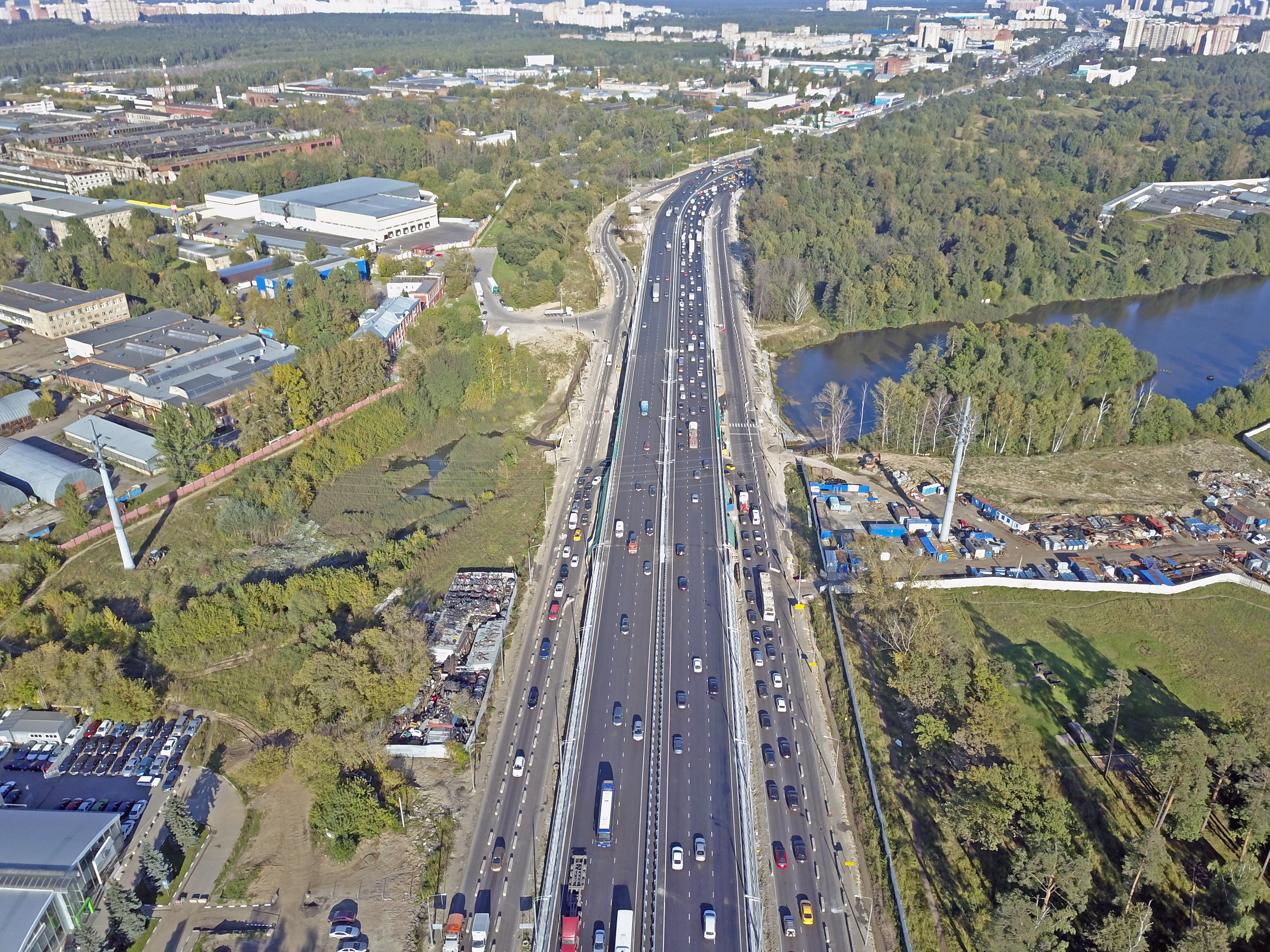
M7 highway in Balashikha, Moscow Oblast.

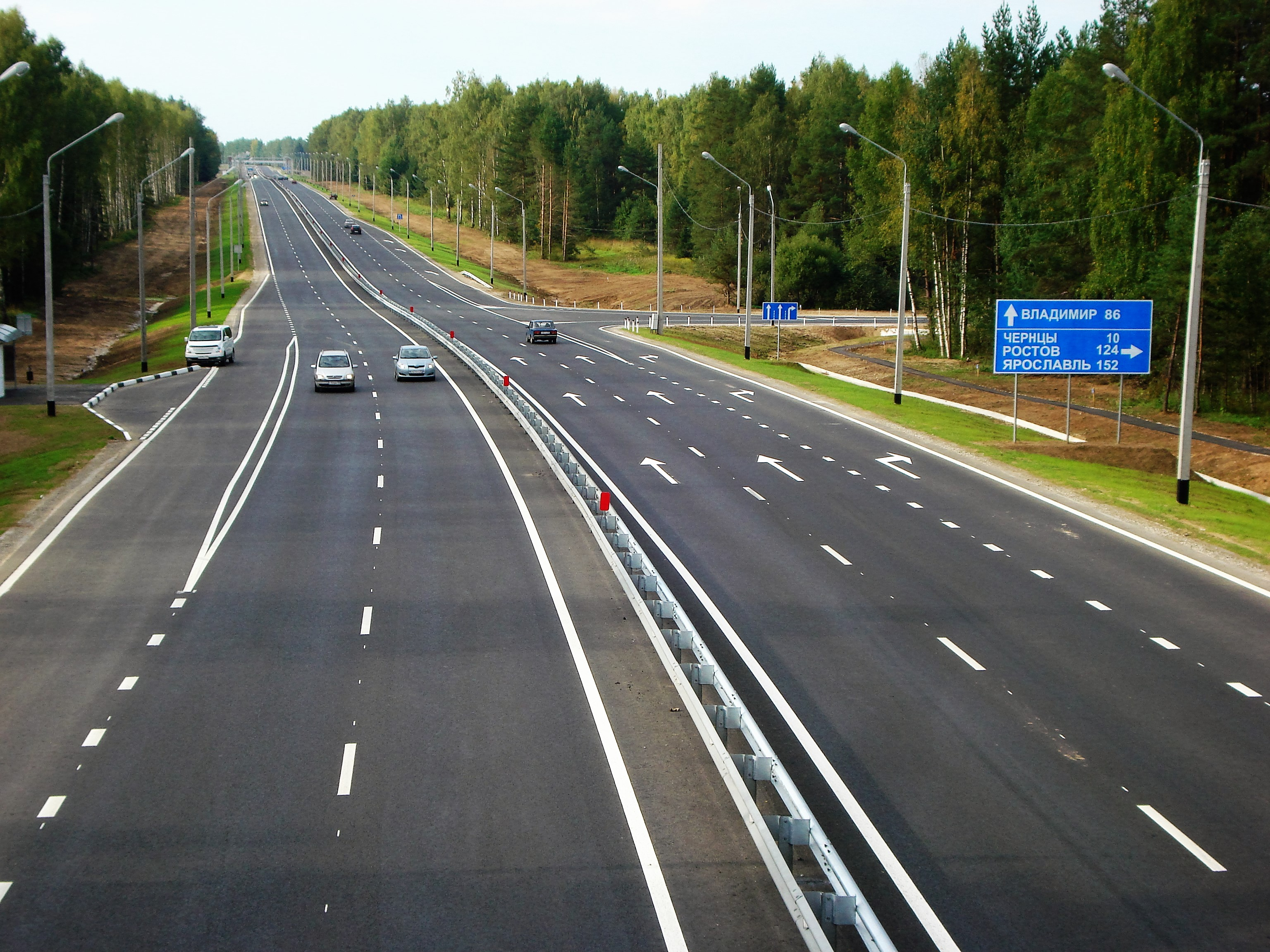
M7 highway in Lezhnevsky District of Ivanovo Oblast.

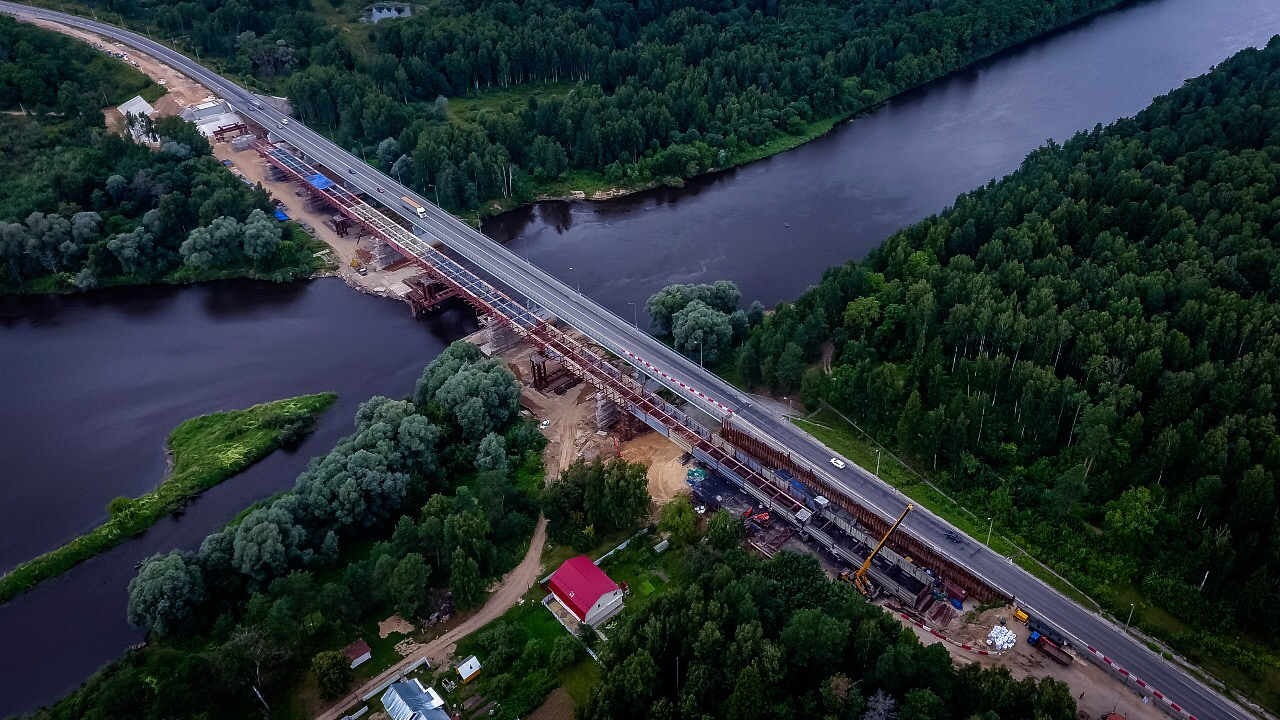
A bridge over Klyazma river in the area of the village of Penkino in Vladimir Oblast.

0 km — Moscow Ring Road
35 km — Elektrostal and Noginsk
65 km — Malaya Dubna near Orekhovo-Zuyevo
Vladimir Oblast
81 km — Pokrov
130 km — Lakinsk
158 km — Yuryevets
162 km — Vladimir
225 km — a branch to Kovrov
273 km — Vyazniki
313 km — Gorokhovets
Nizhny Novgorod Oblast
397 km — crossing the Oka River in Nizhny Novgorod (over the Myza Bridge)
430 km — Kstovo
463 km — Rabotki
491 km — Lyskovo
544 km — Vorotynets
Chuvash Republic
634 km — crossing the Vyatka Highway in Cheboksary
679 km — Tsivilsk
Tatarstan
761 km — crossing the Volga River in Zelenodolsk
809 km — Kazan
969 km — crossing the Vyatka River in Mamadysh
1024 km — Yelabuga
1044 km — crossing the Kama River in Naberezhnye Chelny
Bashkortostan
1134 km — Verkhneyarkeyevo
1230 km — Kushnarenkovo
1280 km — Ufa, M5

== Gallery ==
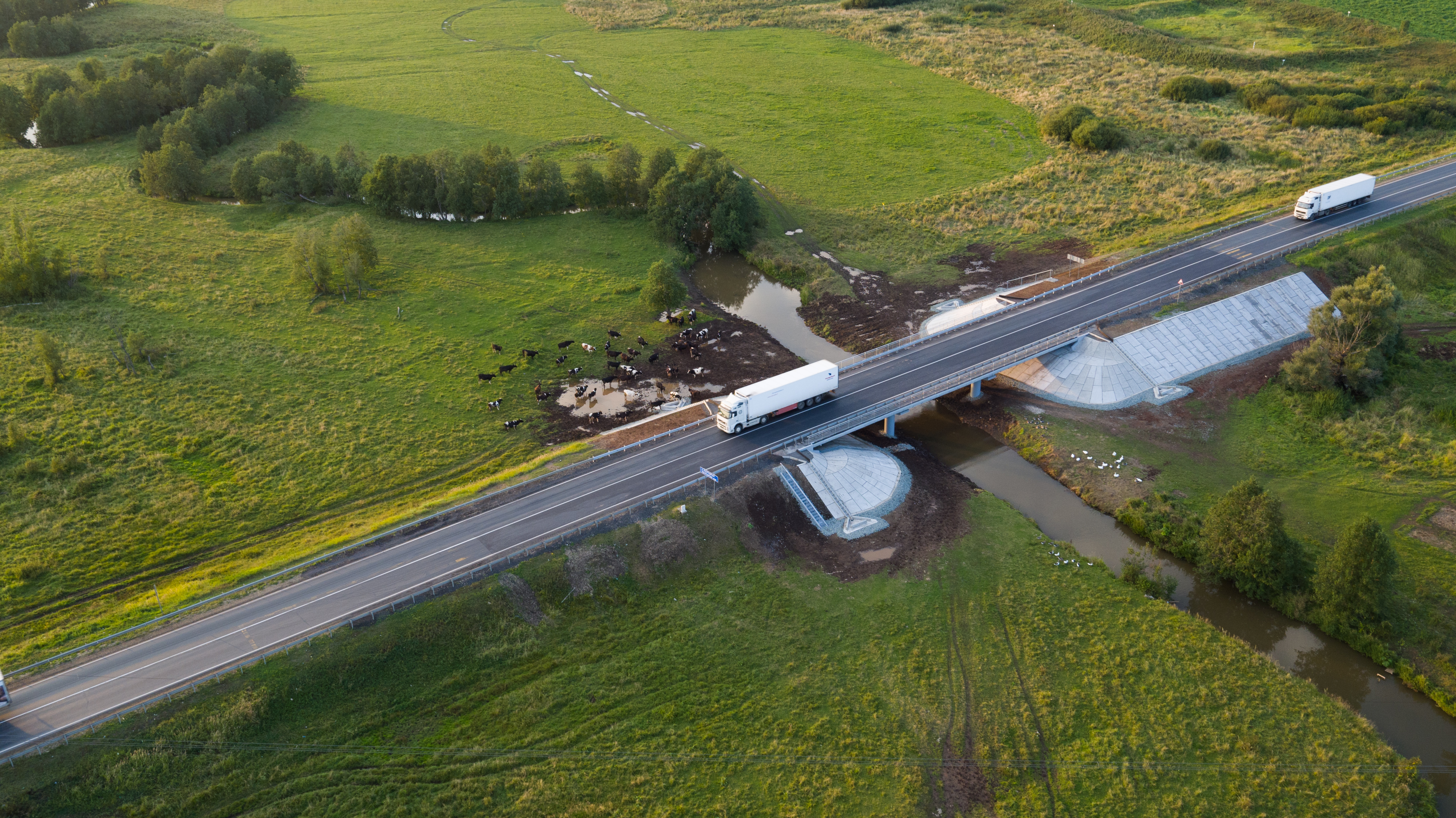
A bridge over Koltymak River in Alnashsky District of the Udmurt Republic.

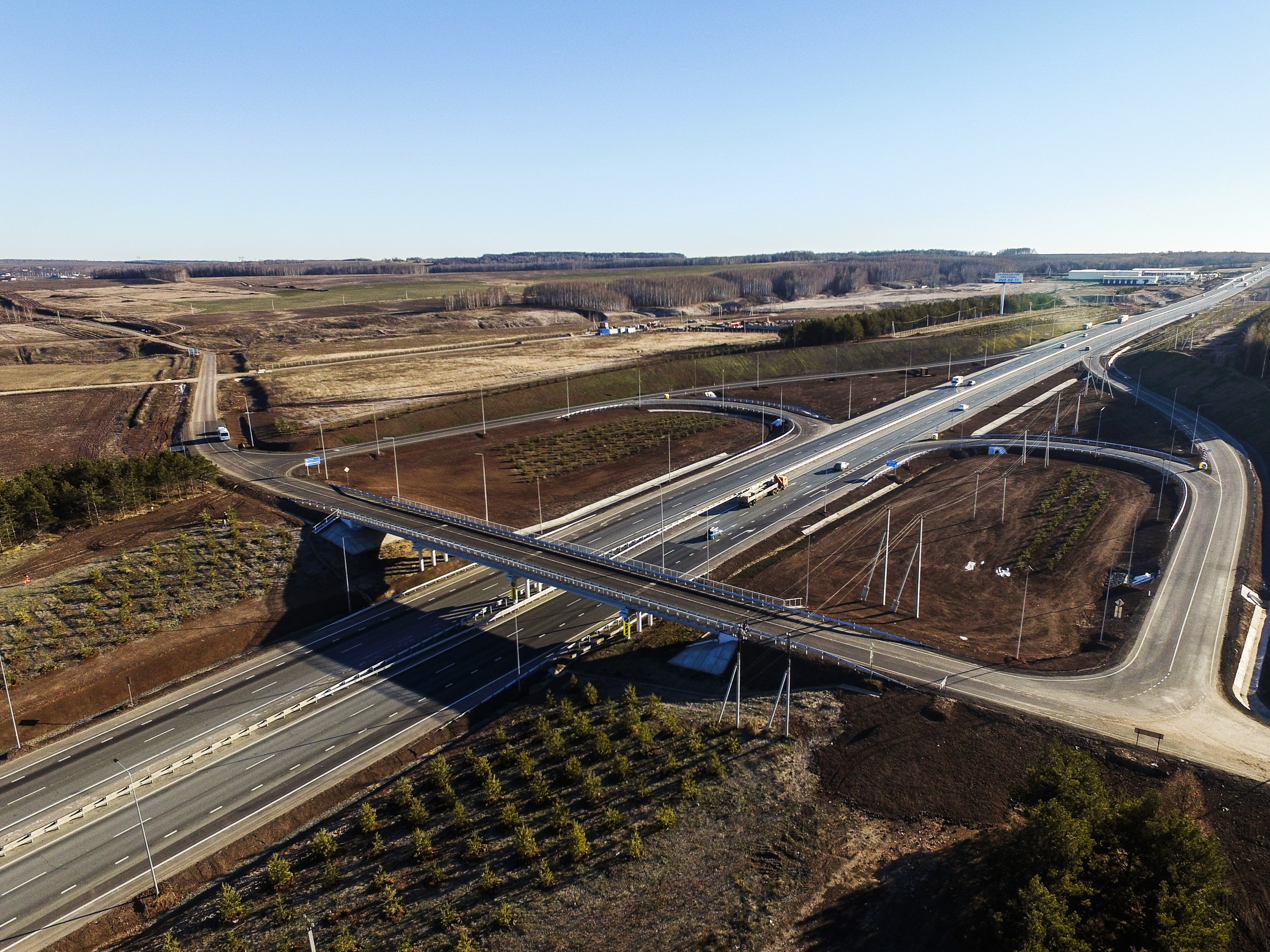

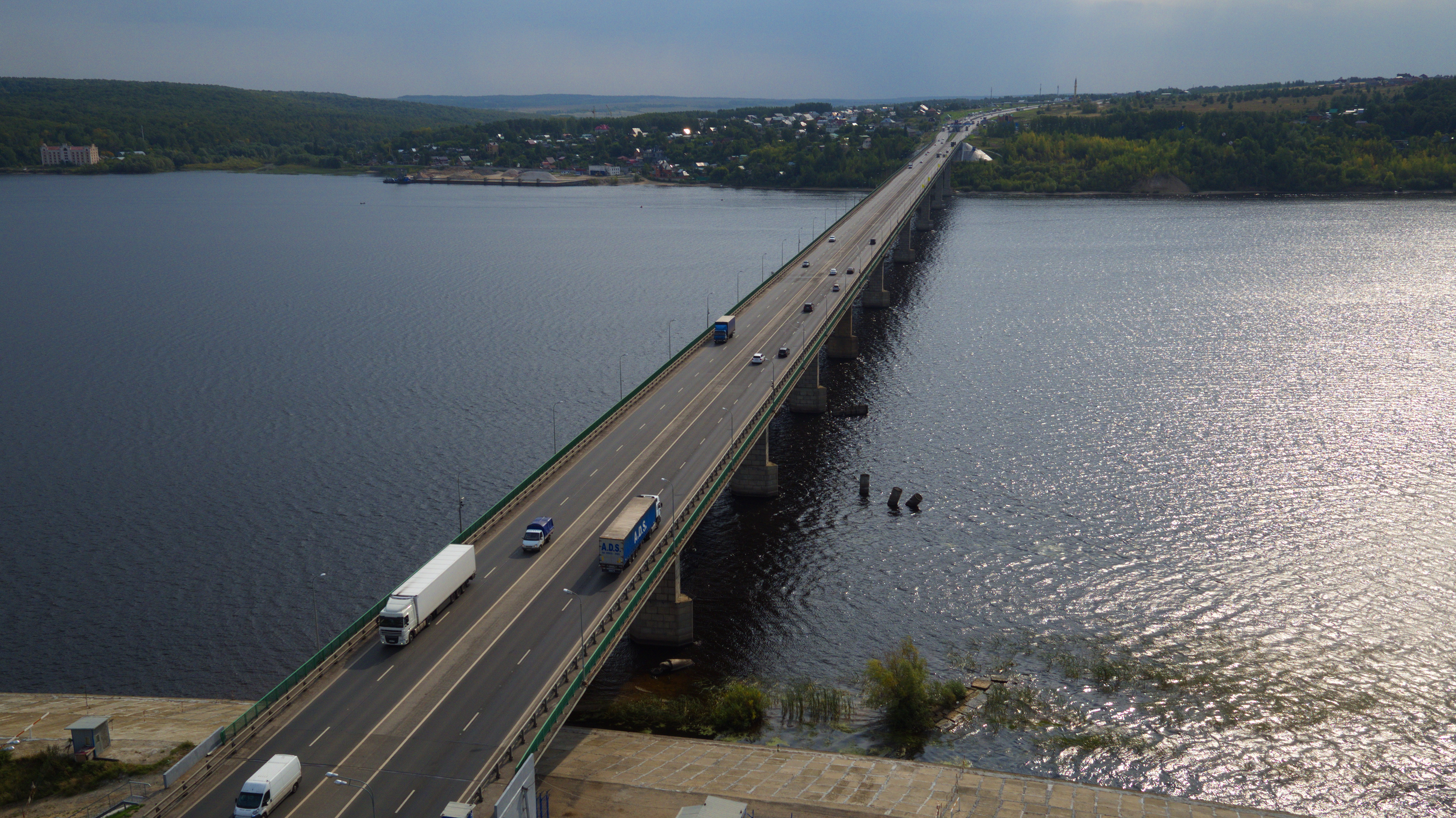
The Zaymishchensky bridge of the M7 highway in Tatarstan.

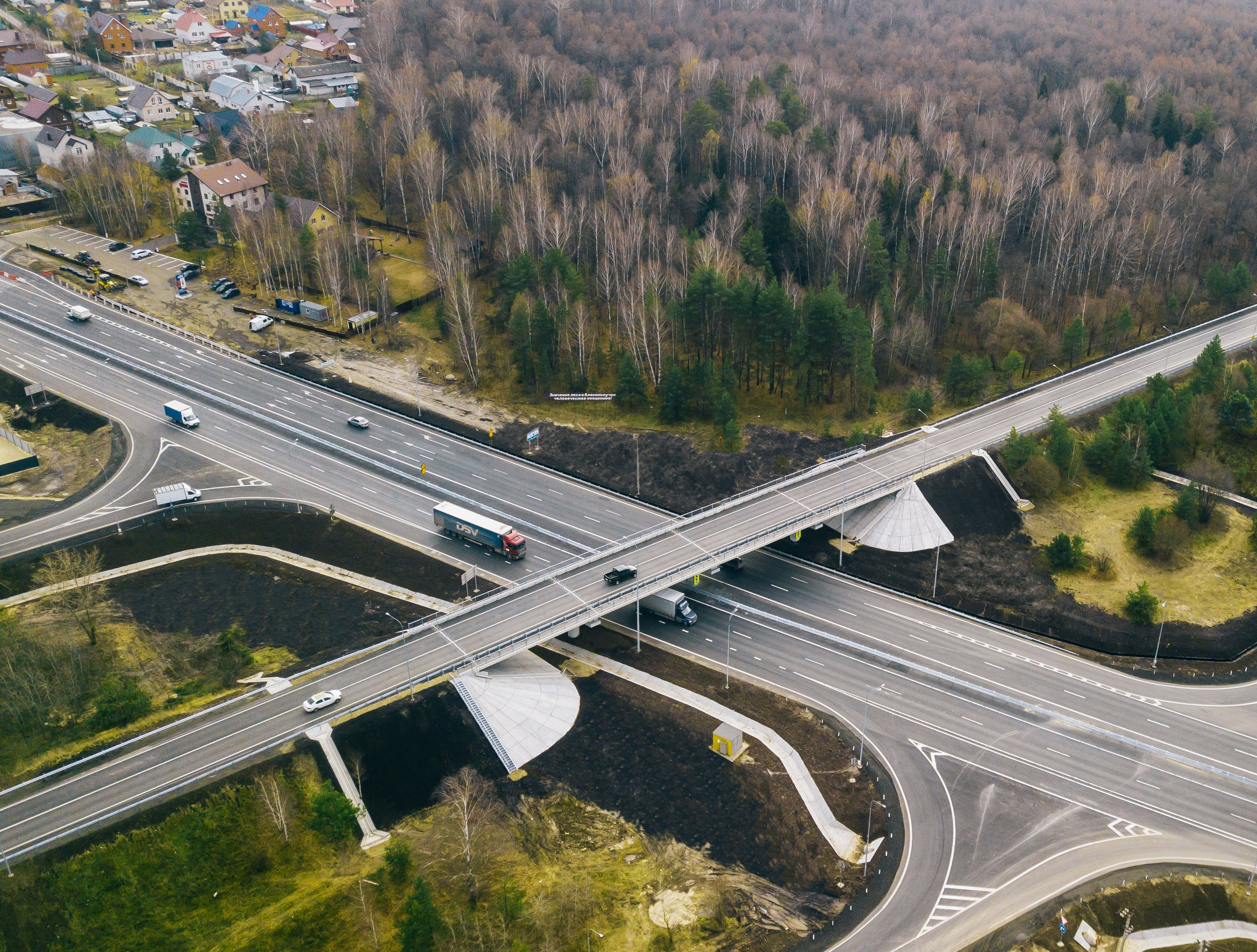
M7 highway in Tatarstan (807th km)

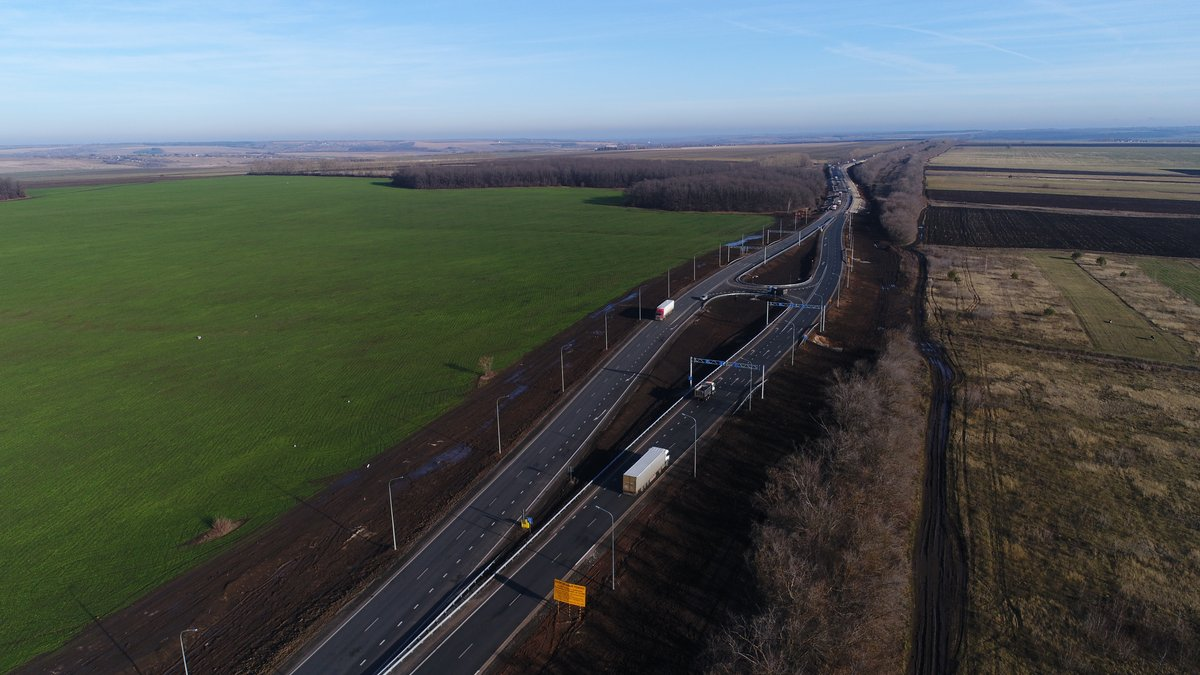
M7 highway in the area of the hamlet of Andreyevo-Bazary in Chuvashia.
