= Zelyony Gorod =

Zelyony Gorod Зелёный Го́род
- Urban-type settlement
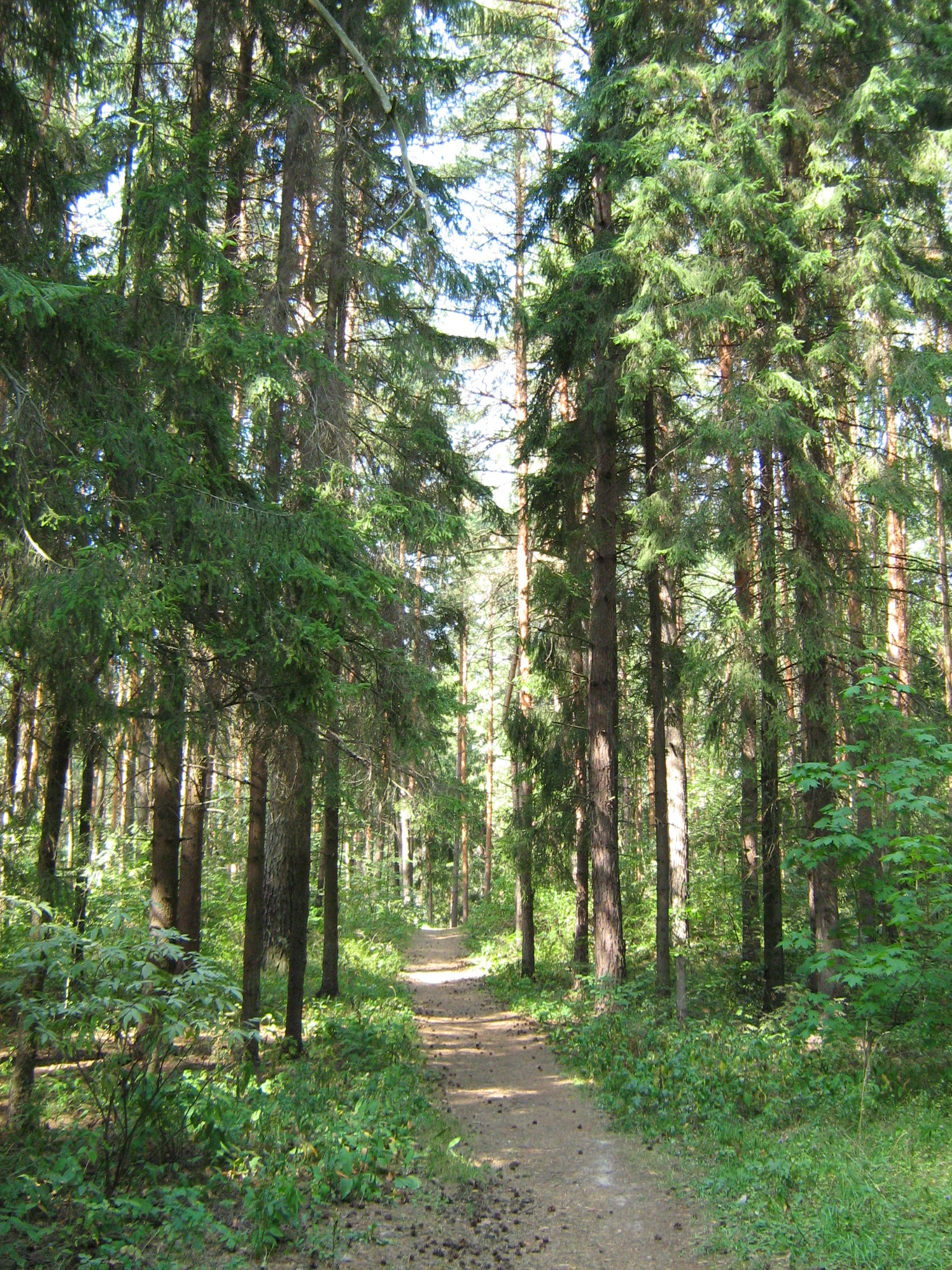
- On a trail in Zelyony Gorod, near Kstovo
- Interactive map of Zelyony Gorod
- Location of Zelyony Gorod Zelyony Gorod (Nizhny Novgorod Oblast)
- Coordinates: 56°10′N 44°05′E
- Country: Russia
- Federal subject: Nizhny Novgorod Oblast

Population (2010 Census)
  - Total: 2,716
  - Estimate (2025): 1,942 (−28.5%)
- Time zone: UTC+3 (MSK)
- Postal code: 603121
- OKTMO ID: 22701000056

Zelyony Gorod (Russian: Зелёный Го́род, lit. green city) is an urban locality (a resort settlement under the administrative jurisdiction of the city of oblast significance of Nizhny Novgorod) in Nizhny Novgorod Oblast, Russia, located in a forested area to the southeast of Nizhny Novgorod and surrounded by the territory of Kstovsky District. Population: 2,716 (2010 census); 2,437 (2002 census); 4,234 (1989 Soviet census).

The forested area around the settlement is a surviving part of a much larger forest area that existed here centuries ago. Geographically, it is located Nizhny Novgorod and Kstovo, and is bounded roughly by Highway M-7 and Pavlovo-Royka-Zeletsino railway from the north and the Kudma River in the south.

Many resort facilities and children's summer camps, originally built by the Soviet state or labor unions, are located in the settlement.

As of 2007, an upscale single-family housing development is being built on the southern outskirts of Zelyony Gorod (the Rassvet area), near the Kudma River.
