= A119 =

A119 may refer to:

- Project A119, "A Study of Lunar Research Flights," a plan developed by the US Air Force to nuke the Moon
- AgustaWestland AW119, a helicopter
- RFA Wave Laird (A119), a ship
- A119 road (England), a road connecting Ware and Watton-at-Stone
- A119 road (Malaysia), a road in Perak connecting Kampung Kuala Dipang and Tapah
- A119 road (Russia), a road connecting Cheboksary and Syktyvkar
