= Fedyakovo, Nizhny Novgorod Oblast =

Rural locality in Kstovsky District, Nizhny Novgorod Oblast, Russia

Coordinates: 56°14′N 44°03′E

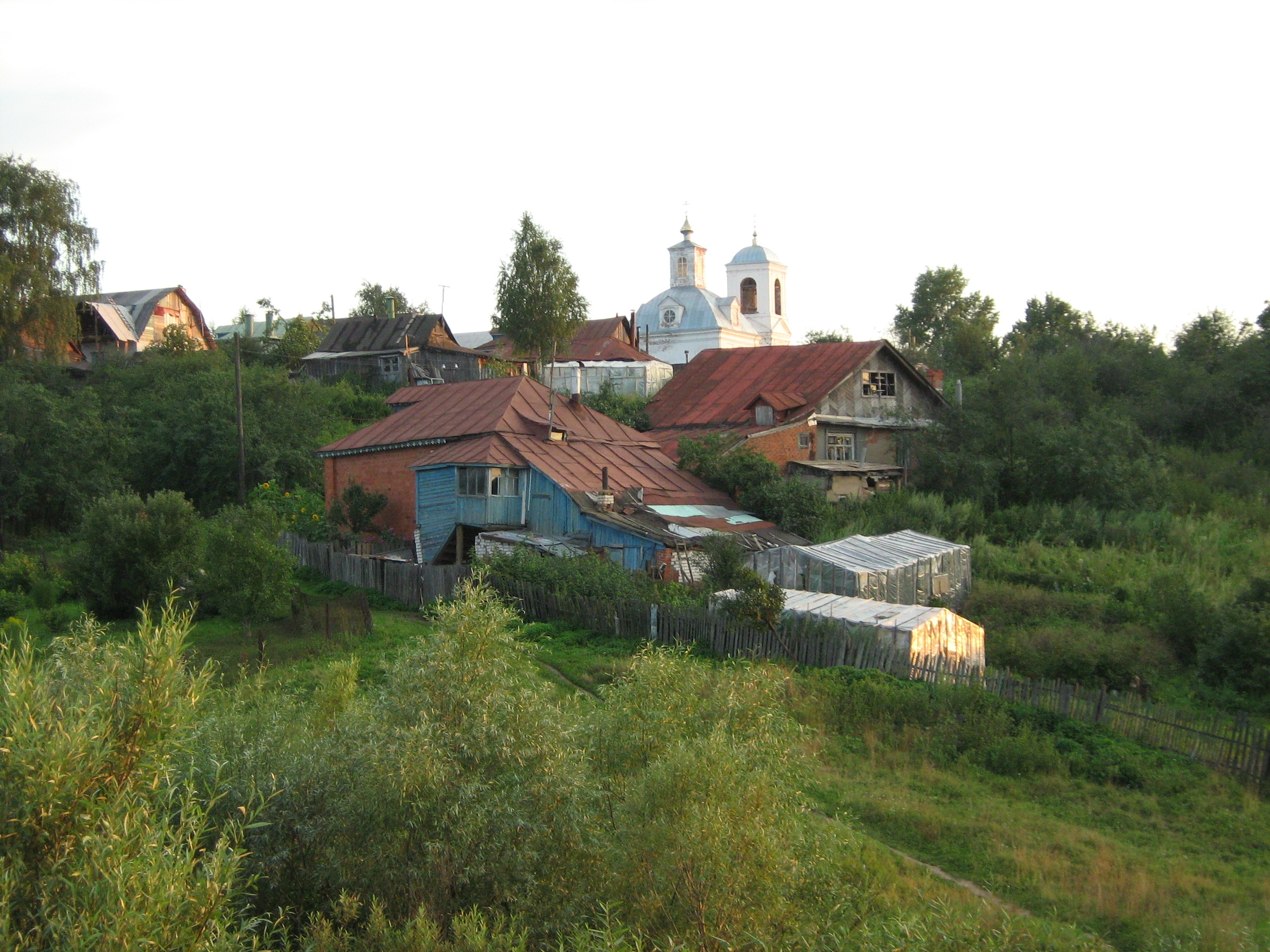
The village of Fedyakovo

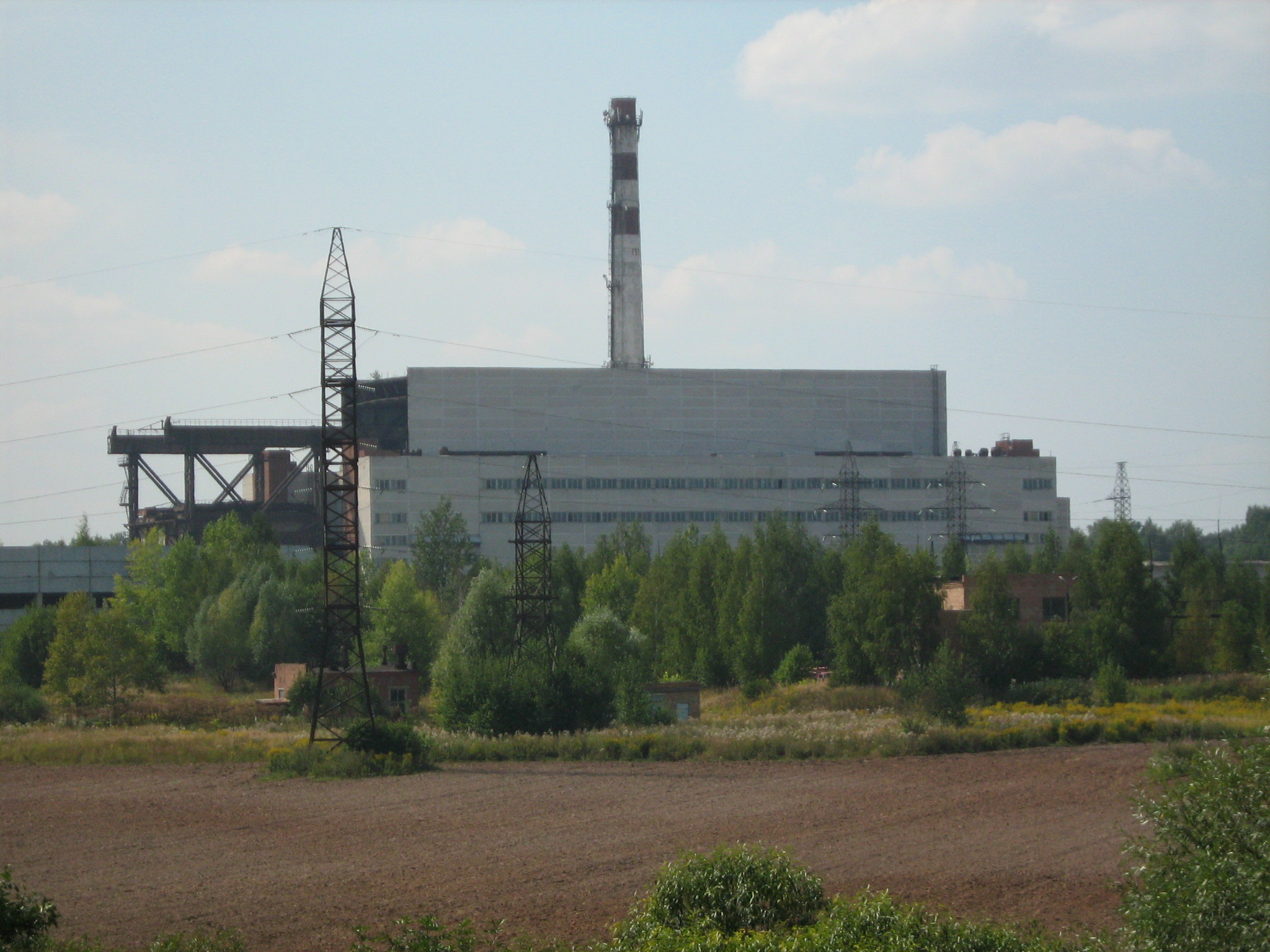
The 1980s: the Nuclear District Heating Plant (unfinished)

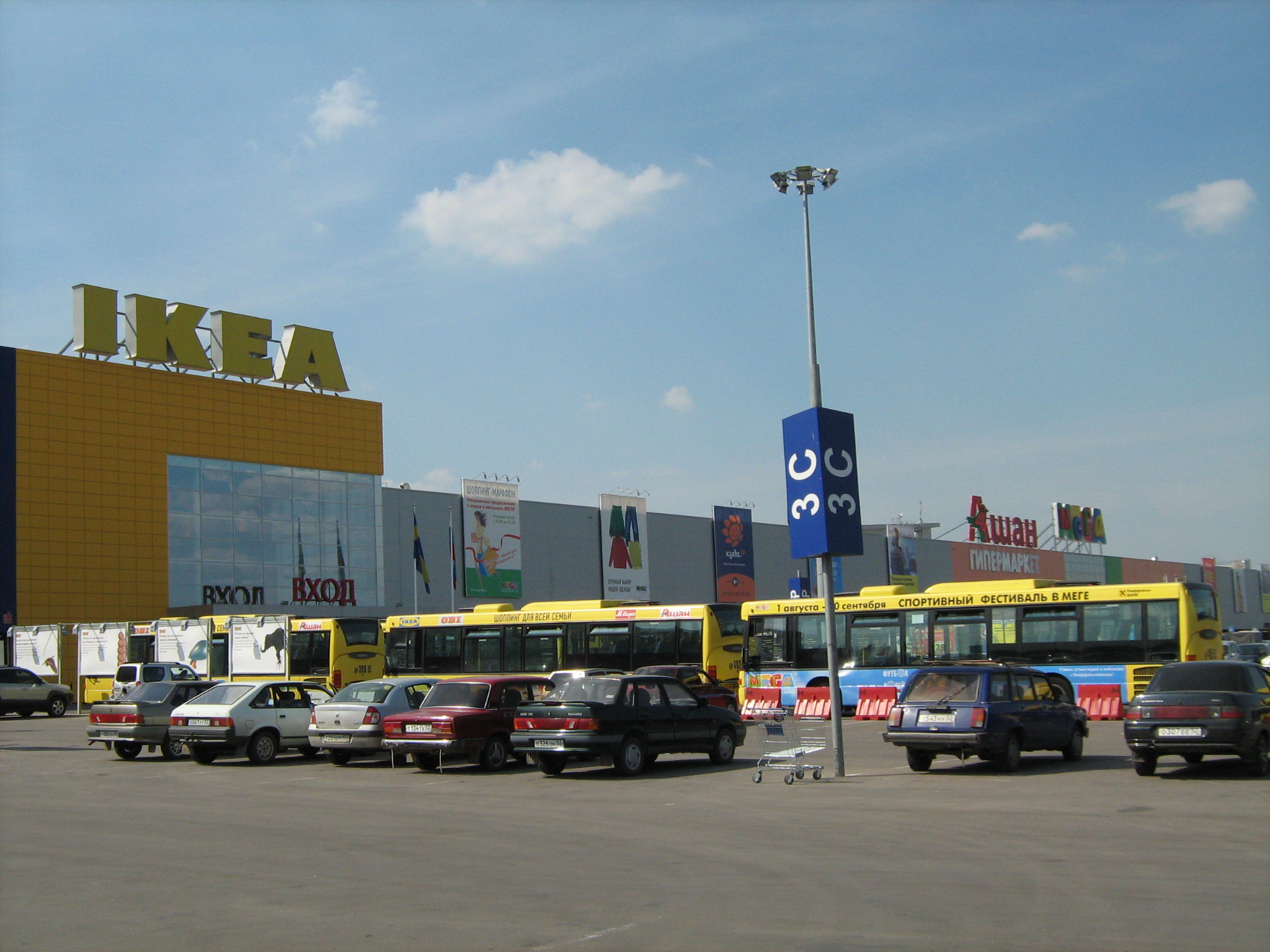
The 2000s: The MEGA mall

Fedyakovo (Russian: Федяко́во) is a rural locality (a selo) in Kstovsky District of Nizhny Novgorod Oblast, Russia, located just a few kilometers outside of the Nizhny Novgorod's city line, with the apartment blocks on the south-eastern edge of the city being easily visible from the village.

The village church is that of Transfiguration of the Lord (Спасо-Преображенская церковь).

== Location ==
The village is located near the intersection of the Russian highway M-7 (Nizhny Novgorod–Kazan) and an important local road connecting Bolshaya Yelnya (a junction on the old Nizhny Novgorod–Kazan highway, with an easy connection with the important Verkhnie Pechery development in Nizhny Novgorod's north-eastern Nizhegorodsky District) with Shcherbinki (a similarly important development in the city's south-eastern Prioksky District). A railway runs by the village as well. This location, making the area of the village a convenient site for any facility intended to serve all of Nizhny Novgorod's Upper City as well as neighboring Kstovo, made the village see two large-scale construction projects within the last thirty years.

== GAST ==
In the early 1980s, the construction of Gorky Nuclear District Heating Plant (Горьковская атомная станция теплоснабжения (ГАСТ), GAST) was started. Unlike a conventional nuclear power plant, the facility was meant not to generate electricity, but simply to heat water for heating apartment blocks throughout Nizhny Novgorod's Upper City. By the early 1990s, after spending some $1 billion of investment money, the station building (although not the nuclear equipment inside) and the hot-water pipelines connecting it to the city had been mostly completed; but completing the project became infeasible in the post-Chernobyl political climate. In the years since the abandonment of the project, the building has been either disused, or used by local entrepreneurs for a variety of purposes, including bottling liquor.

== MEGA ==
In the 2000s, the same convenient location made the Fedyakovo the site of another major construction project. MEGA, the IKEA-owned Russian mall developer, chose the site for its first mall in Nizhny Novgorod metropolitan area. Open in October 2006, the megamall, anchored by an IKEA store and an Auchan hypermarket, has become one the region's premier retail facilities. Ample car parking, free shuttle buses to Nizhny Novgorod's outer neighborhoods and Kstovo, as well as service by regular commuter buses and "routed taxis" provide easy access for customers from throughout the metropolitan area.

The arrangements in effect since August 1, 2007, provide free shuttle buses to the shopping center from the following areas:

- No. 270, from Avtozavodsky District of Nizhny Novgorod, via Shcherbinki (Prioksky City District)
- No. 271, from Verkhniye Pechyory (Nizhegorodsky District) of Nizhny Novgorod.
- No. 272, from Kstovo.
