= List of highways numbered 17 =

Route 17, or Highway 17 can refer to the following roads:

For the roads named "A17", see list of A17 roads.

== International ==
- E17 European route E17
- E017 European route E017

== Australia ==
- Brisbane Valley Highway, Queensland
- D'Aguilar Highway, Queensland

== Canada ==
- Alberta Highway 17
  - Alberta Highway 17 (former)
- British Columbia Highway 17
  - British Columbia Highway 17A
- Manitoba Highway 17
  - Winnipeg Route 17
- New Brunswick Route 17
- Ontario Highway 17
- Prince Edward Island Route 17
- Saskatchewan Highway 17

== Costa Rica ==
- National Route 17

== Czech Republic ==
- I/17 Highway; Czech: Silnice I/17

== Denmark ==
Highway 17

== France ==
- Route nationale 17

== Greece ==
- EO17 road

== India ==
- National Highway 17 (India)
- State Highway 17 (Kerala)

== Iran ==
- Road 17

== Ireland ==
- N17 road

== Italy ==
- Autostrada A17
- RA 17

== Japan ==
- Japan National Route 17
- Kan-Etsu Expressway

== Korea, South ==
- Iksan–Pyeongtaek Expressway
- Pyeongtaek–Paju Expressway
- National Route 17

== Malaysia ==
- Butterworth Outer Ring Road
- FT 17 Pasir Gudang Highway

== New Zealand ==
- (Former) New Zealand State Highway 17

== Paraguay ==
- National Route 17

== Poland ==
- Expressway S17
- National road 17

== South Africa ==
- N17 road (South Africa)

== United Kingdom ==
- British A17 (King's Lynn - Newark-on-Trent)

== United States ==
- Interstate 17
- U.S. Route 17
  - U.S. Route 17-1
- New England Interstate Route 17 (former)
- Alabama State Route 17
  - County Route 17 (Lee County, Alabama)
- Arkansas Highway 17
- California State Route 17
  - County route A17 (California)
  - County Route E17 (California)
  - County Route G17 (California)
  - County Route J17 (California)
  - County Route S17 (California)
- Colorado State Highway 17
- Connecticut Route 17
- Delaware Route 17
- Florida State Road 17
  - County Road 17 (Polk County, Florida)
- Georgia State Route 17
- Illinois Route 17
- Indiana State Road 17
  - County Road 17 (Elkhart County, Indiana)
- Iowa Highway 17
- K-17 (Kansas highway)
- Kentucky Route 17
- Louisiana Highway 17
- Maine State Route 17
- Maryland Route 17
- Massachusetts Route 17 (former)
- M-17 (Michigan highway)
- Minnesota State Highway 17 (former)
  - County Road 17 (Anoka County, Minnesota)
  - County Road 17 (Chisago County, Minnesota)
  - County Road 17 (Hennepin County, Minnesota)
  - County Road 17 (Scott County, Minnesota)
- Mississippi Highway 17
- Missouri Route 17
- Montana Highway 17
- Nebraska Highway 17
- Nevada State Route 17 (former)
- New Jersey Route 17
  - County Route 17 (Monmouth County, New Jersey)
- New Mexico State Road 17
- New York State Route 17
  - New York State Route 17D (former)
  - New York State Route 17G (former)
  - New York State Route 17H (1930–1937) (former)
  - New York State Route 17H (1940s–1971) (former)
  - New York State Route 17J (former)
  - New York State Route 17K
  - New York State Route 17L (former proposal)
  - New York State Route 17M
  - County Route 17 (Allegany County, New York)
  - County Route 17 (Cattaraugus County, New York)
  - County Route 17 (Clinton County, New York)
  - County Route 17 (Columbia County, New York)
  - County Route 17 (Delaware County, New York)
  - County Route 17 (Dutchess County, New York)
  - County Route 17 (Essex County, New York)
  - County Route 17 (Franklin County, New York)
  - County Route 17 (Genesee County, New York)
  - County Route 17 (Niagara County, New York)
  - County Route 17 (Oneida County, New York)
  - County Route 17 (Ontario County, New York)
  - County Route 17 (Orange County, New York)
  - County Route 17 (Oswego County, New York)
  - County Route 17 (Otsego County, New York)
  - County Route 17 (Putnam County, New York)
  - County Route 17 (Rockland County, New York)
  - County Route 17 (Schoharie County, New York)
  - County Route 17 (Schuyler County, New York)
  - County Route 17 (St. Lawrence County, New York)
  - County Route 17 (Steuben County, New York)
  - County Route 17 (Suffolk County, New York)
  - County Route 17 (Tioga County, New York)
  - County Route 17 (Warren County, New York)
  - County Route 17 (Washington County, New York)
  - County Route 17 (Yates County, New York)
- North Carolina Highway 17 (former)
- North Dakota Highway 17
- Ohio State Route 17
- Oklahoma State Highway 17
- Pennsylvania Route 17
- South Dakota Highway 17
- Tennessee State Route 17
- Texas State Highway 17
  - Texas State Highway Loop 17 (former)
  - Texas State Highway Spur 17
  - Farm to Market Road 17
  - Texas Park Road 17
- Utah State Route 17
- Vermont Route 17
- Virginia State Route 17 (former)
- Washington State Route 17
  - Primary State Highway 17 (Washington) (former)
- West Virginia Route 17
- Wisconsin Highway 17

Territories

- Guam Highway 17
- Puerto Rico Highway 17

== See also ==
- List of A17 roads
- List of highways numbered 17A
- List of highways numbered 17B
- List of highways numbered 17C
- List of highways numbered 17E
- List of highways numbered 17F
- List of highways numbered 17J
- Highway 17, a location in the video game Half-Life 2

Preceded by 16	Lists of highways 17	Succeeded by 18
