= Kadekodi =

Coordinates: 14°23′N 74°25′E

Kadekodi is a small village situated on the National Highway 17 (NH17) on the way from Honnavar to Kumta. Kadekodi is part of Kumta Taluk, Uttara Kannada district, Karnataka State.

== History ==
The village existed for ages however there is no monumental history attached to the village. In Kannada, "Kade" means last and "Kodi" means water channel. The village is situated on the Arabian Sea hence one could see many water channels meeting the Arabian Sea.

== Transportation ==
=== Road ===
Kadekodi is very well connected through roads with a passing National highway NH-17 through it.

- NH-17 (Panvel - Edapally): Mumbai, Panjim, Mangalore and Ernakulam can be reached by this road.

It can be reached by even state highways connecting Kumta to sirsi and to hubli via yellapur. Kadekodi village has its own bus stop near Gore Cross for boarding the local government bus.

=== Rail ===
- Kumta is the nearest railway station. Kumta [KT] is well connected through konkan railways which has rails plying from Gandhidham, Panjim, Mar Goa towards Mangalore (Mangalore Central [MAQ] and Mangalore Junction [MAJN]), Kumbakonam and also vice versa. The railway station is very near to city situated about a kilometre away from national highway.

=== Air ===
- Nearest airports are Mangalore International Airport and Goa International airport.

Mangalore airport is about 212 km from Kumta.
