= Schwarzenau =

Schwarzenau may refer to:

== Places ==
- Austria
  - Schwarzenau, Lower Austria, a municipality in the Zwettl district in Lower Austria
  - Schwarzenau (Achenkirch), a village in the municipality of Achenkirch in the Schwaz district in Tirol
- Germany
  - Schwarzenau, Bad Berleburg, a borough of Bad Berleburg in North Rhine-Westphalia
  - Schwarzenau (Schwarzach am Main), a borough in the municipality Schwarzach am Main in Bavaria
  - Schloss Schwarzenau, a castle in the Schwarzenau borough of Bad Berleburg
- Poland
  - the German name of the Polish city of Czerniejewo
- Russia
  - 1938-1945 Schwarzenau was the name of a village in the East Prussian district of Gumbinnen, before 1936 called 'Jodßen', 1936-1938 called 'Jodschen', and after 1945 renamed Dvoriki; not confirmed

== See also ==
- Schwarzenau Brethren, a German Baptist Brethren
