= Kstovo refinery =

Oil refinery in Kstovo, Russia

Kstovo Refinery
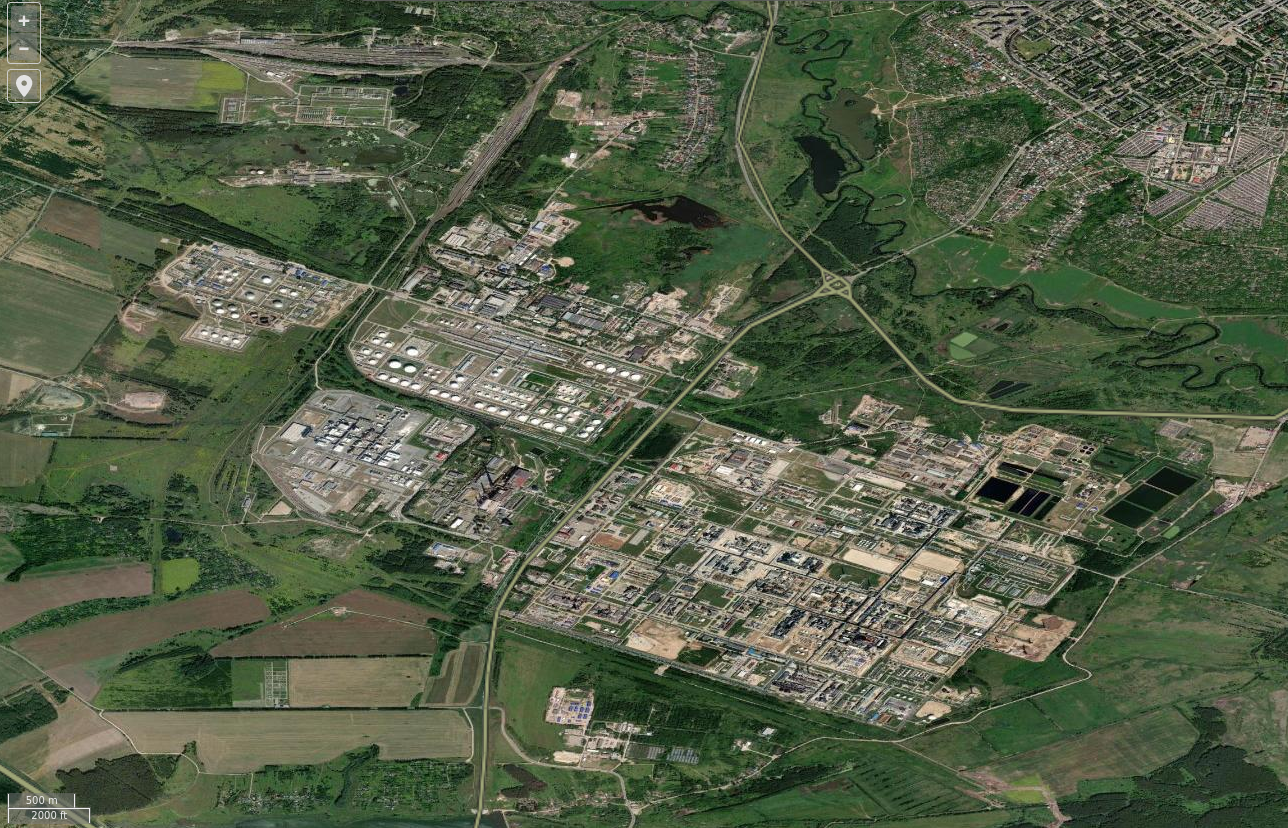
- Satellite imagery of Kstovo Refinery

- Location within Nizhny Novgorod Oblast Location within European Russia
- Interactive map of Kstovo Refinery
- Location: Kstovo, Russia; 56°06′21″N 44°08′38″E

Refinery details
- Operator: Lukoil
- Opened: 1958
- No. of employees: ~2,400
- Website: nnos.lukoil.ru

The Kstovo Refinery, also known as Lukoil-Nizhegorodnefteorgsintez (Russian: Лукойл-Нижегороднефтеоргсинтез) is an oil refinery in the Russian city of Kstovo, one of the largest in the country. This refinery has belonged to the Russian company Lukoil since 2001.

== History ==
=== Soviet era ===
In October 1950, the Soviet Council of Ministers approved a resolution for constructing an oil refinery near the city of Nizhny Novgorod. The local councils then collected surrounding farmlands and began construction.

=== Privatization ===
In the 1990s, following the dissolution of the Soviet Union, a private company was created to regulate the plant, called "Nizhegorodnefteorgsintez" (Russian: Нижегороднефтеоргсинтез). The production output in 1997 was at 12.3 million tons, and exported as far west as Hungary and east as Tatarstan.

In 2001, the company became part of the large corporation Lukoil, which owned over 80% of its shares by 2006.

In 2010, Lukoil made an investment worth $975 million to create a new complex at the plant, which was expected to increase production from 1.8 to 3.2 million tons per year. By 2024, capacity was 17 million tons per year.

In 2022, the company made an investment worth 100 billion rubles to create a new complex for processing oil residue, which is expected to improve production.

=== Ukrainian drone attacks ===
During 2024, the third year following the 2022 Russian invasion of Ukraine, Ukrainian forces began a series of drone and missile attacks on military and oil production targets deep in Russian territory, attacks that were not attempted during the first nine years of the Russo-Ukrainian War. On 29 January 2025, Ukraine launched a drone attack on the Kstovo Refinery, located approximately 800 km (500 mi) from the border with Ukraine, causing several explosions and resulting in large fires in several units. Ukrainian military sources claimed that all four drones sent struck their targets. Local residents reported at least three explosions inside the refinery. Russian officials downplayed the extent of the damage. Two days later, Russian authorities clarified that that blaze burned for two days at the petrochemical plant and Sibur (the operator of the plant) said they had temporarily shut operations at the plant down. Attacks by Ukrainian drones were reported also on 5 and 16 October 2025. Additional drone attacks were carried out on 20 May 2026, causing a fire at the ELOU AVT-6 processing unit, and on 2 November 2026.

== See also ==
- List of oil refineries
- Petroleum industry in Russia
