= List of highways numbered 17J =

The following highways are numbered 17J:

== United States ==
- Nebraska Link 17J
- New York State Route 17J (former)

== See also ==
- List of highways numbered 17
