= Murashi =

Murashi (Russian: Мураши) is the name of several inhabited localities in Russia.

Urban localities

- Murashi, Kirov Oblast, a town in Murashinsky District of Kirov Oblast; 59°24′N 48°59′E

Rural localities

- Murashi, Novosibirsk Oblast, a selo in Ust-Tarksky District of Novosibirsk Oblast
- Murashi, Perm Krai, a village in Permsky District of Perm Krai
