= List of highways numbered 17C =

The following highways are numbered 17C:

== United States ==
- Nebraska Link 17C
- New York State Route 17C

== See also ==
- List of highways numbered 17
