= A17 =

A17, A 17, A.17 or A-17 may refer to:

- A17 Cutty Sark, a 1930 British Saro aircraft
- A17 road, in several countries
- Aero A.17, a 1922 Czech sailplane
- ARM Cortex-A17, a microprocessor core
- Apple A17, a system on a chip mobile processor designed by Apple
- Samsung Galaxy A17, an Android-based smartphone from Samsung
- British NVC community A17 (Ranunculus penicillatus ssp. pseudofluitans community), a British Isles plant community
- Focke-Wulf A 17, an airliner
- Northrop A-17, an aircraft
- English Opening in chess (Encyclopaedia of Chess Openings code A17, among others)
- Subfamily A17, a rhodopsin-like receptors subfamily
