= List of highways numbered 17F =

The following highways are numbered 17F:

== United States ==
- Nebraska Link 17F
- New York State Route 17F (former)

== See also ==
- List of highways numbered 17
