= List of highways numbered 17B =

The following highways are numbered 17B:

== Canada ==
- Ontario Highway 17B

== India ==
- National Highway 17B (India)

== United States ==
- County Road 17B (Polk County, Florida)
- Nebraska Link 17B
- New York State Route 17B

== See also ==
- List of highways numbered 17
