= List of A17 roads =

This is a list of roads designated A17 or A-17. Entries are sorted in alphabetical order by country.

- O'Shea Road in Melbourne, Victoria.
- Portrush Road in Adelaide, South Australia
- A17 motorway (Belgium), a road connecting Bruges and Tournai
- A 17 motorway (Germany), a road connecting Dresden and the Czech border
- A17 highway (Lithuania), a road connecting Panevėžio and aplinkkelis
- A17 road (Malaysia), a road in Perak connecting Parit and Bota Kanan
- A17 motorway (Netherlands), a road connecting the A16 motorway and the A58 motorway near Roosendaal
- A 17 road (Sri Lanka), a road connecting Galle and Madampe
- A17 road (United Kingdom) may refer to:
  - A17 road (England), a road connecting Newark-on-Trent, Nottinghamshire and King's Lynn, Norfolk
  - A17 road (Isle of Man), a road connecting Bride and the Andreas road
- A17 road (United States of America) may refer to:
  - A17 road (California), a road connecting the I-5 and the SR 44

== See also ==
- List of highways numbered 17
