= List of highways numbered 17A =

The following highways are numbered 17A:

== Canada ==
- British Columbia Highway 17A
- Ontario Highway 17A
- Prince Edward Island Route 17A

== India ==
- National Highway 17A (India)

== United States ==
- County Route 17A (Lee County, Alabama)
- Connecticut Route 17A
- County Road 17A (Polk County, Florida)
- New York State Route 17A
  - New York State Route 17A (1920s–1930) (former)
- Oklahoma State Highway 17A
- Secondary State Highway 17A (Washington) (former)

== See also ==
- List of highways numbered 17
