= Vyatka Highway =

Russian federal highway between Cheboksary and Syktyvkar

Federal Highway R176
- Федеральная автомобильная дорога Р176
- Vyatka Highway
- Vyatka Highway highlighted red

Route information
- Length: 872 km (542 mi)

Major junctions
- North end: Syktyvkar
- South end: M 7 south of Cheboksary

Location
- Country: Russia

Highway system
- Russian Federal Highways
← R 158	→ R 177

Russian route R176 or Vyatka Highway (Russian: Федеральная автомобильная дорога P176 «Вятка») is a Russian federal highway that runs from Cheboksary to Syktyvkar with a total length 872 km. The name comes from the Vyatka River and the historical name of the city of Kirov.

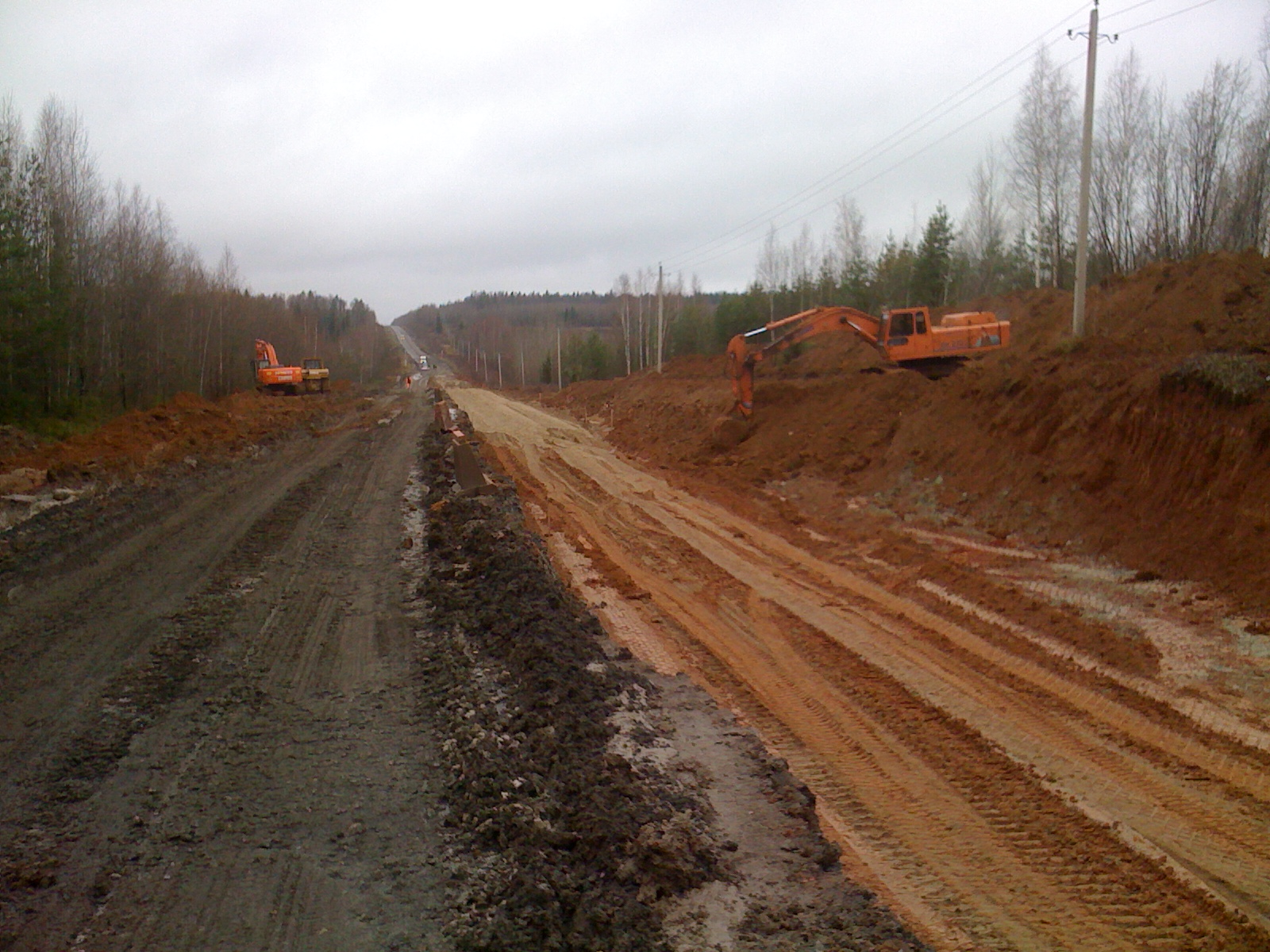
Overhaul of "Vyatka" highway between Yurja - Murashi, Kirov Oblast, October 2011

Before 2018, the road was designated A119.
