= List of highways numbered 17E =

The following highways are numbered 17E:

== United States ==
- Nebraska Link 17E
- New York State Route 17E (former)

== See also ==
- List of highways numbered 17
