= Virginia State Route 17 =

The following highways in Virginia have been known as State Route 17:

- State Route 17 (Virginia 1918-1933), Troutville to Gordonsville
- U.S. Route 17 in Virginia, 1926–present
- State Route 17 (Virginia 1933), 1933 - mid-1960s, now U.S. Route 17 from Falmouth to Winchester
