= European route E017 =

Road in trans-European E-road network

E017

Route information
- Length: 323 km (201 mi)

Major junctions
- From: Yelabuga
- To: Ufa

Location
- Countries: Russia

Highway system
- International E-road network; A Class; B Class

E 017 is a European B class road in Russia, connecting the cities Yelabuga – Ufa.

== Route ==
- M 7:Yelabuga - Ufa
