= Veliky Vrag, Kstovsky District, Nizhny Novgorod Oblast =

Rural locality in Kstovsky District, Nizhny Novgorod Oblast, Russia

Coordinates: 56°09′05″N 44°14′19″E

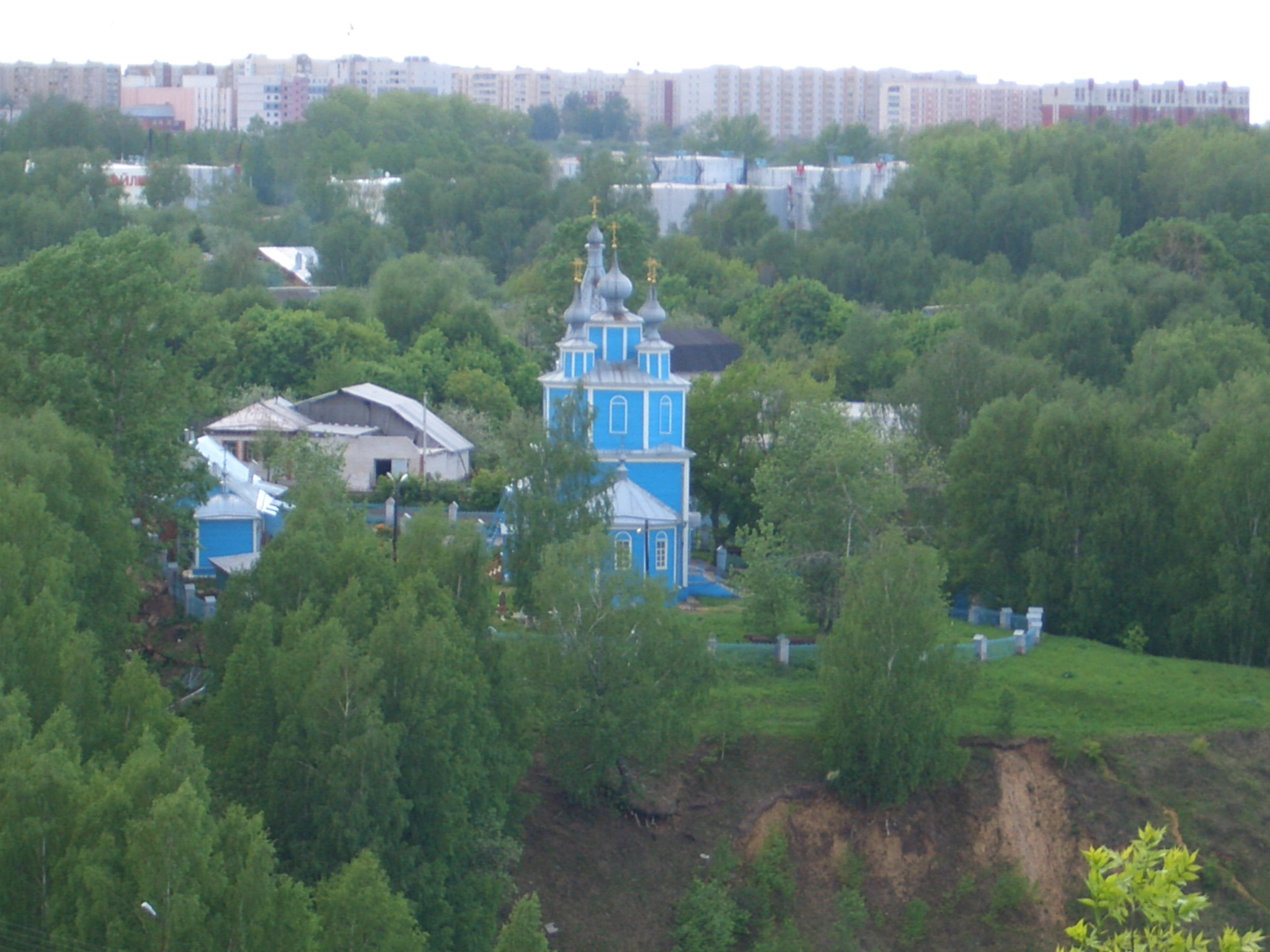
The selo of Veliky Vrag, with its 18th-century church of Our Lady of Kazan, is still safe from urban expansion

Veliky Vrag (Russian: Вели́кий Враг) is a rural locality (a selo) in Kstovsky District of Nizhny Novgorod Oblast, Russia, located on the high southern bank of the Volga River just northeast of the town of Kstovo.

Local historical sites include the Church of Our Lady of Kazan. It was built in 1792 and is now protected as a heritage site, owned by the federal government.
