= Penkino, Vladimir Oblast =

Penkino Пенкино
- Village
- Location within Vladimir Oblast Location within Russia
- Coordinates: 56°11′N 40°54′E
- Country: Russia
- Region: Vladimir Oblast
- District: Kameshkovsky District
- Time zone: UTC+3:00

Penkino (Russian: Пенкино) is a rural locality (a village) in Penkinskoye Rural Settlement, Kameshkovsky District, Vladimir Oblast, Russia. The population was 403 as of 2010. There are 8 streets.

== Geography ==
Penkino is located on the Klyazma River, 30 km south of Kameshkovo (the district's administrative centre) by road. Krasnoramenye is the nearest rural locality.
