= Kstovo =

Town in Nizhny Novgorod Oblast, Russia

Kstovo Кстово
- Town
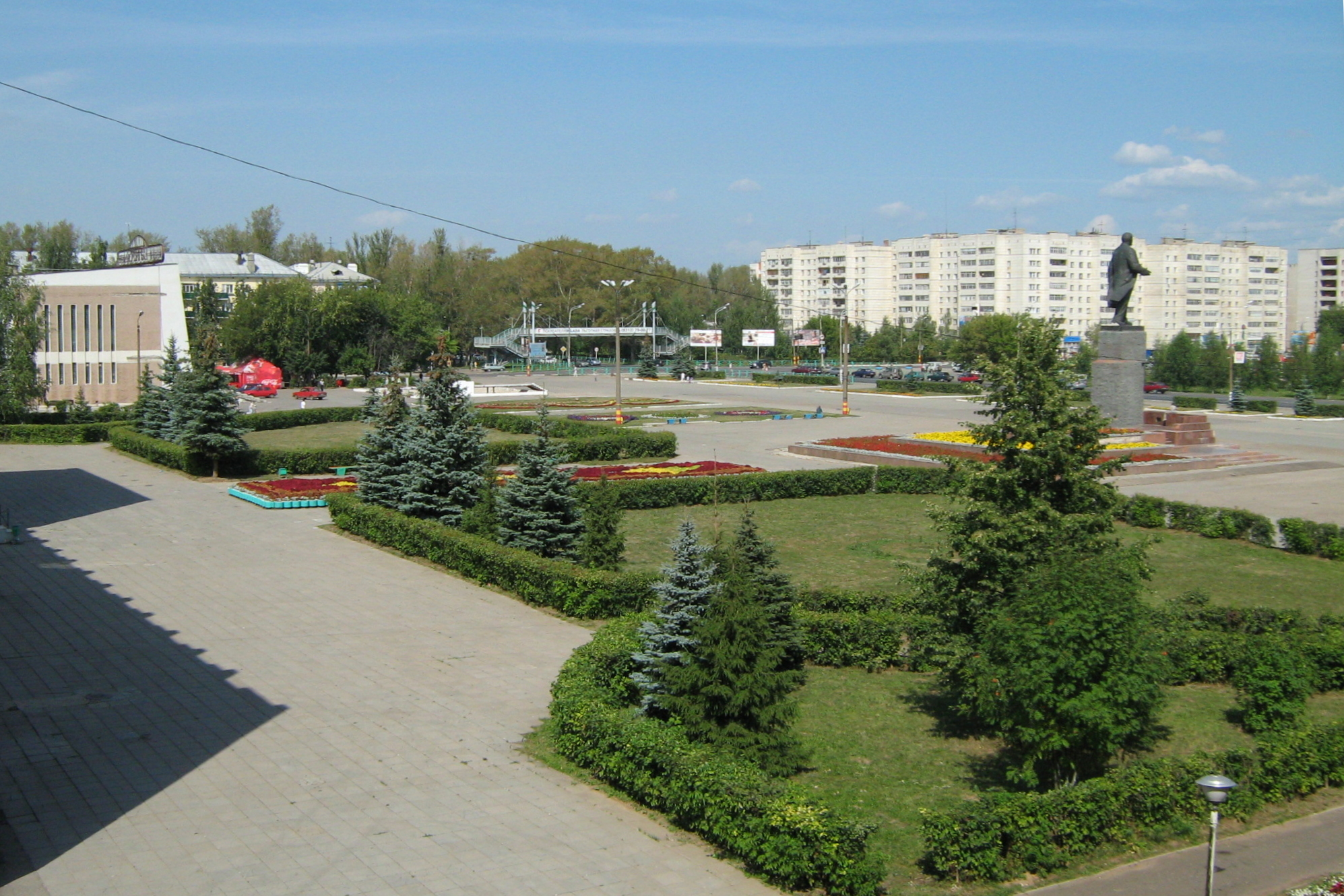
- Lenin Square in Kstovo

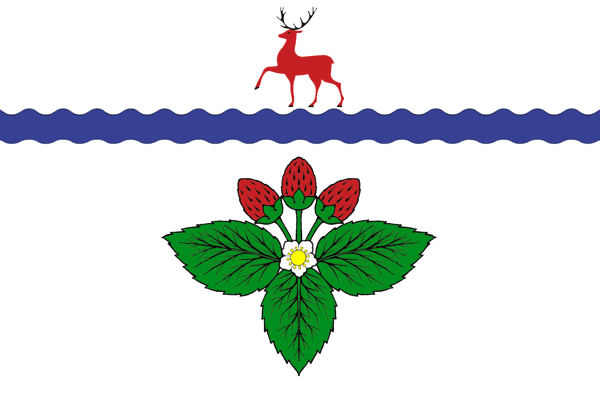
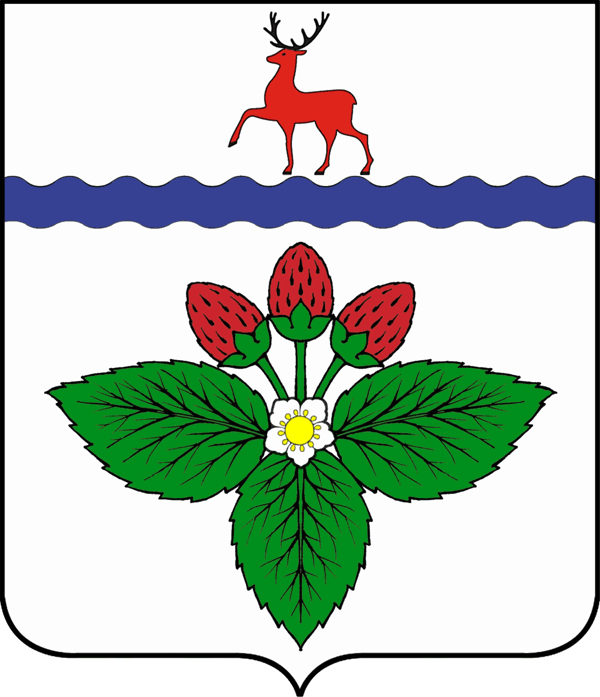
- Flag Coat of arms
- Interactive map of Kstovo
- Location of Kstovo Kstovo (Nizhny Novgorod Oblast)
- Coordinates: 56°10′N 44°10′E
- Country: Russia
- Federal subject: Nizhny Novgorod Oblast
- Administrative district: Kstovsky District
- Town of district significanceSelsoviet: Kstovo
- Founded: 14th century
- Town status since: 1957
- Elevation: 119.9 m (393 ft)

Population (2010 Census)
  - Total: 66,657
  - Estimate (2025): 61,118 (−8.3%)
  - Rank: 233rd in 2010

Administrative status
  - Capital of: Kstovsky District, town of district significance of Kstovo

Municipal status
  - Municipal district: Kstovsky Municipal District
  - Urban settlement: Kstovo Urban Settlement
  - Capital of: Kstovsky Municipal District, Kstovo Urban Settlement
- Time zone: UTC+3 (MSK)
- Postal codes: 607650, 607651, 607654–607657, 607660–670664, 607669
- Dialing code: +7 83145
- OKTMO ID: 22637101001

Kstovo (Russian: Кстово) is a town and the administrative center of Kstovsky District in Nizhny Novgorod Oblast, Russia, located on the right bank of the Volga River, 22 kilometers (14 mi) southeast of Nizhny Novgorod, the administrative center of the oblast. Population: 66,657 (2010 census); 66,944 (2002 census); 62,414 (1989 Soviet census).

== Etymology ==
The place name is said to have originated from the Mordvin ksty, meaning "strawberry".

== History ==
The village of Kstovo was mentioned as early as the 14th century.

With the construction of Novogorkovsky Oil Refinery, which started operations on August 18, 1958,) a new settlement was built a few kilometers to the northwest of the old village of Kstovo, on the high ground between the Volga and the Kudma Rivers. Since then, the western part of the town centered on the original village of Kstovo, and, still quite rural in character, has been commonly referred to as the Old Kstovo (Staroye Kstovo), while the newer eastern part, built in the 1950s and still expanding, is known as the New Kstovo (Novoye Kstovo). As the New Kstovo expanded over the years, it completely or partially displaced several smaller villages.

Kstovo was granted urban-type settlement status in 1954 and town status in 1957.

== Administrative and municipal status ==
Within the framework of administrative divisions, Kstovo serves as the administrative center of Kstovsky District. As an administrative division, it is incorporated within Kstovsky District as the town of district significance of Kstovo. As a municipal division, the town of district significance of Kstovo is incorporated within Kstovsky Municipal District as Kstovo Urban Settlement.

== Economy ==
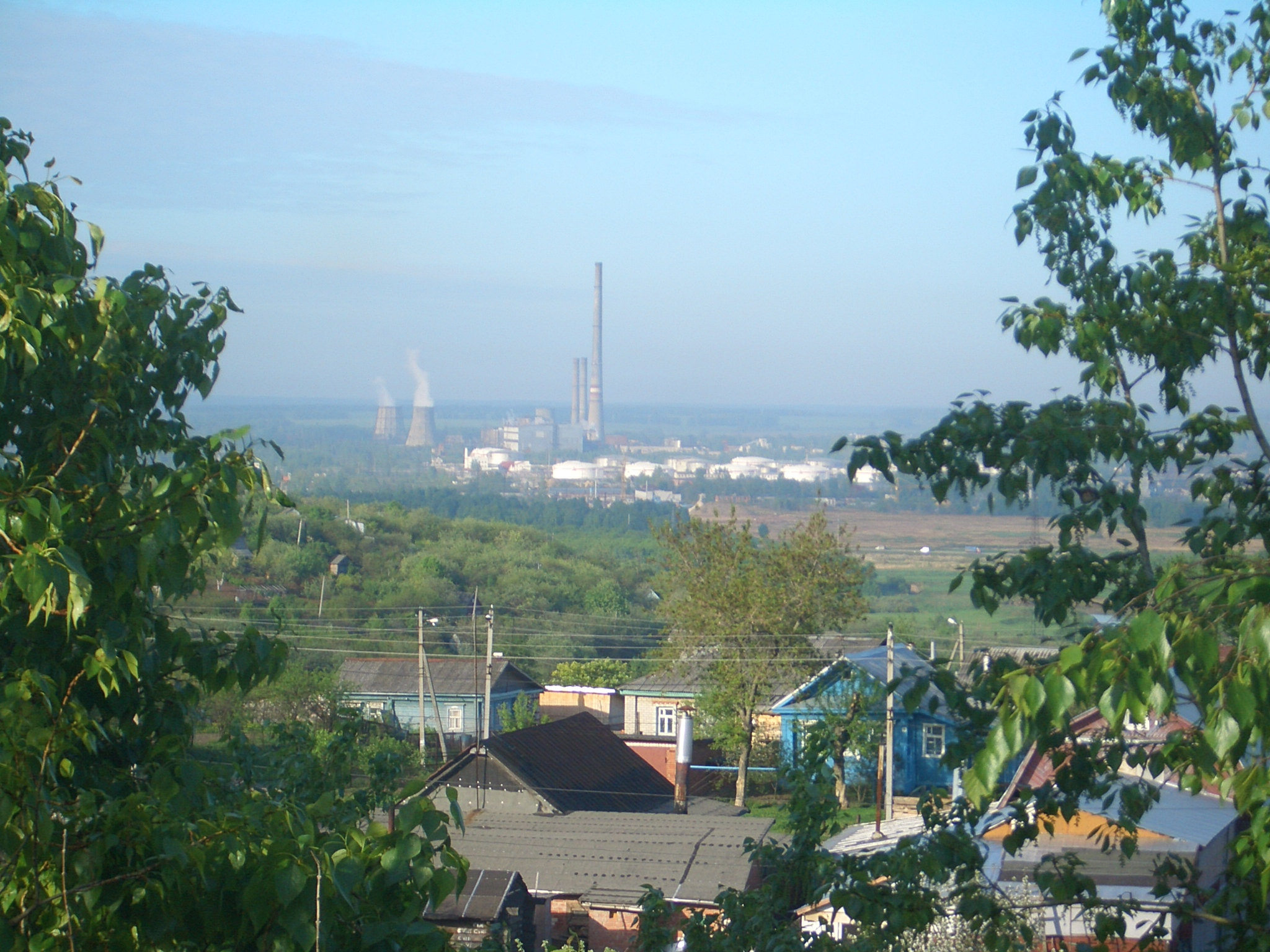
The heat and power plant is located in the industrial area south of the town and can be seen from many apartments

Kstovo's main industrial zone is located south of the town, on the southern side of the Kudma River. It is centered on the petrochemical plants of Lukoil-Nizhegorodnefteorgsintez (formerly NORSI-Oil and Novogorkovsky Oil Refinery), a subsidiary of Lukoil, which is the town's main employer, and, historically, the reason for the town's existence.

The "BVK" plant, which started operation in 1973 and was closed in 2003, used n-paraffins (produced by the oil refinery nearby) as feed for yeast, in order to produce the so-called "protein and vitamin concentrate" (single-cell protein) for use as animal food. The facility was originally run by the Soviet Ministry of Microbiological Industry. As of c. 1990, it produced some 300,000 tons of its product per year. The facility also produced certain pharmaceutical products, such as Coenzyme Q10 (Ubiquinone-10), which is used as a dietary supplement.

Belgium's SolVin is working with SIBUR on building a PVC production plant "RusVinyl" in Kstovsky District.

There are also a bitumen plant, a wine/liquor distillery Mitsar, a tire repair and recycling plant, and the usual assortment of local food industry enterprises.

A cogeneration power plant supplies electricity into the regional electric grid (305 MWt) and hot water for heating town apartment buildings. In November 2008, the local power company announced its plans to increase the power plant's electricity production capacity to 605 MWt; the new power generation unit was scheduled to be brought online by the end of 2011.

The town has a large farmer's market, and a decent selection of supermarkets and retail stores.

== Transportation ==
Kstovo is served by the Moscow–Nizhny Novgorod–Kazan Highway (M7), a river tanker port on the Volga, an electric railway branch, and a number of oil and oil-product pipelines, such as the Sever Pipeline.

The town has a history of building bypass roads to keep some of the transit traffic (either the east–west traffic on M7, or traffic headed for the petrochemical industrial area south of the town) off the town streets, only to see the development overtake them a decade or so later, the "bypass" not being a true bypass anymore. Most recently, in 2003 a highway bypass was completed a few kilometers south of the town (cutting through a section of the Zelyony Gorod forest) both taking M7 away from the town and providing convenient road access to the Lukoil area.

The Kstovo railway branch is primarily used to serve the needs of the oil refinery. Although commuter trains from Nizhny Novgorod's Myza terminal stop not far from both the Old and the New Kstovo, the stations are not particularly conveniently located. Throughout most of the town's history, commuter trains were fairly slow and only ran two or three times a day, and thus were popular mostly with retirees and other persons eligible for free or discount fares. Around 2011 or 2012, the passenger rail service to Kstovo was discontinued altogether. As of 2013, the local authorities have proposed the resumption of the commuter rail service between Nizhny Novgorod and Kstovo; the proposal includes the construction of a new, more conveniently located passenger station in Kstovo, as well as straightening of the railway line.

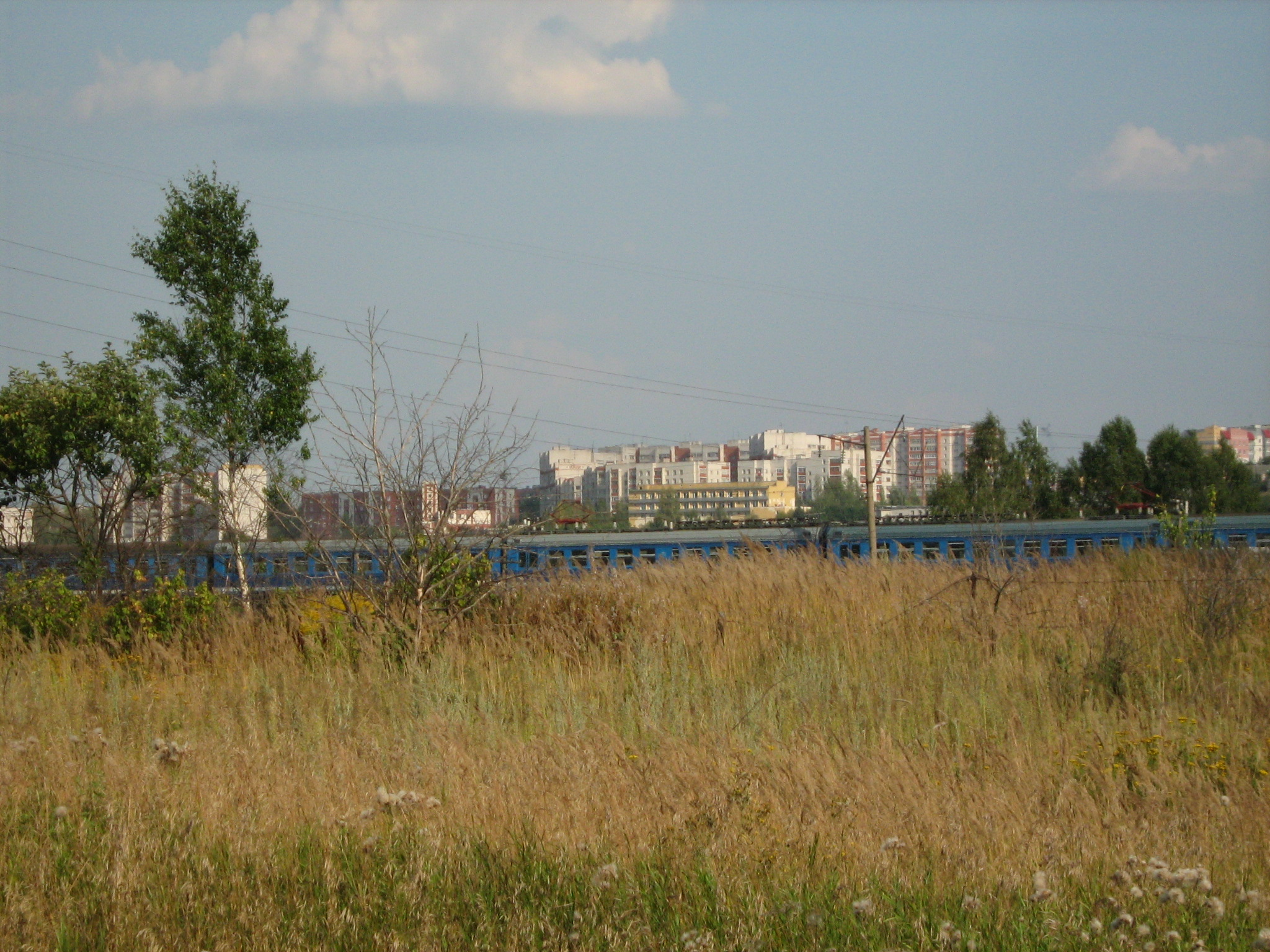
A commuter train in Kstovo

Volga hydrofoil boats used to stop at Kstovo in the 1970s and 1980s, but the town no longer appears in the boat schedules.

Therefore, most of passenger travel between Kstovo and Nizhny Novgorod is by road. Commuter buses and routed taxis to Nizhny Novgorod, as well as suburban buses to villages throughout Kstovsky District, run from a bus station on the west side of New Kstovo. Some long-distance buses between Nizhny Novgorod and the destinations to the east (Lyskovo, Cheboksary, etc.) stop there as well. There are also shuttle buses from Kstovo's Lenina Square to the Mega shopping mall in Fedyakovo, in the western part of Kstovsky District.

Most summers, during the beach season, ferry boat service operates between Kstovo and the beach area on the north bank of the Volga.

== Education ==
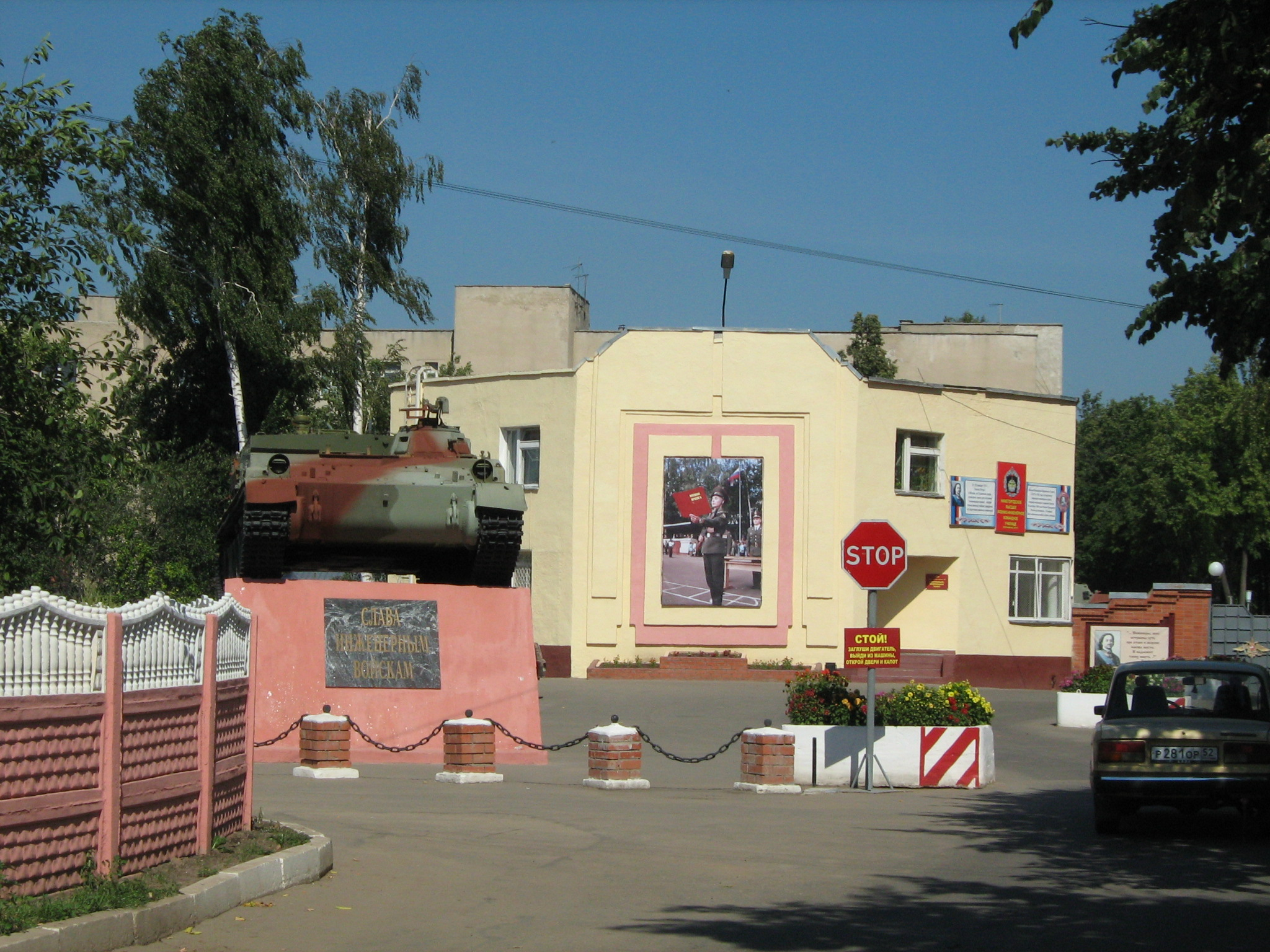
The Military Engineering College

An Oil Industry Community College trains skilled workers and technicians for the petrochemical industry.

Nizhny Novgorod Technological University offers evening classes in Kstovo for the students studying in its distance education chemical engineering program.

Nizhny Novgorod Military Engineering College, founded in 1801 in St. Petersburg and moved in 1960 to Kaliningrad, received its current name in 1995, when it was transferred to Kstovo.

== Culture and recreation ==
The town has a puppet theater, a Palace of Culture, a public library, and an active chess club. The movie theater was popular with the residents during the Soviet era, but closed down after the advent of home video. Part of its premises were used by an Eldorado electronics store for a few years in the early 2000s.

Indoor water park Atoll was opened in February 2015 in Kstovo's Lenin Square. This is the first facility of this kind in Nizhny Novgorod Oblast, and is intended to serve the entire Nizhny Novgorod metropolitan area.

== Sports ==
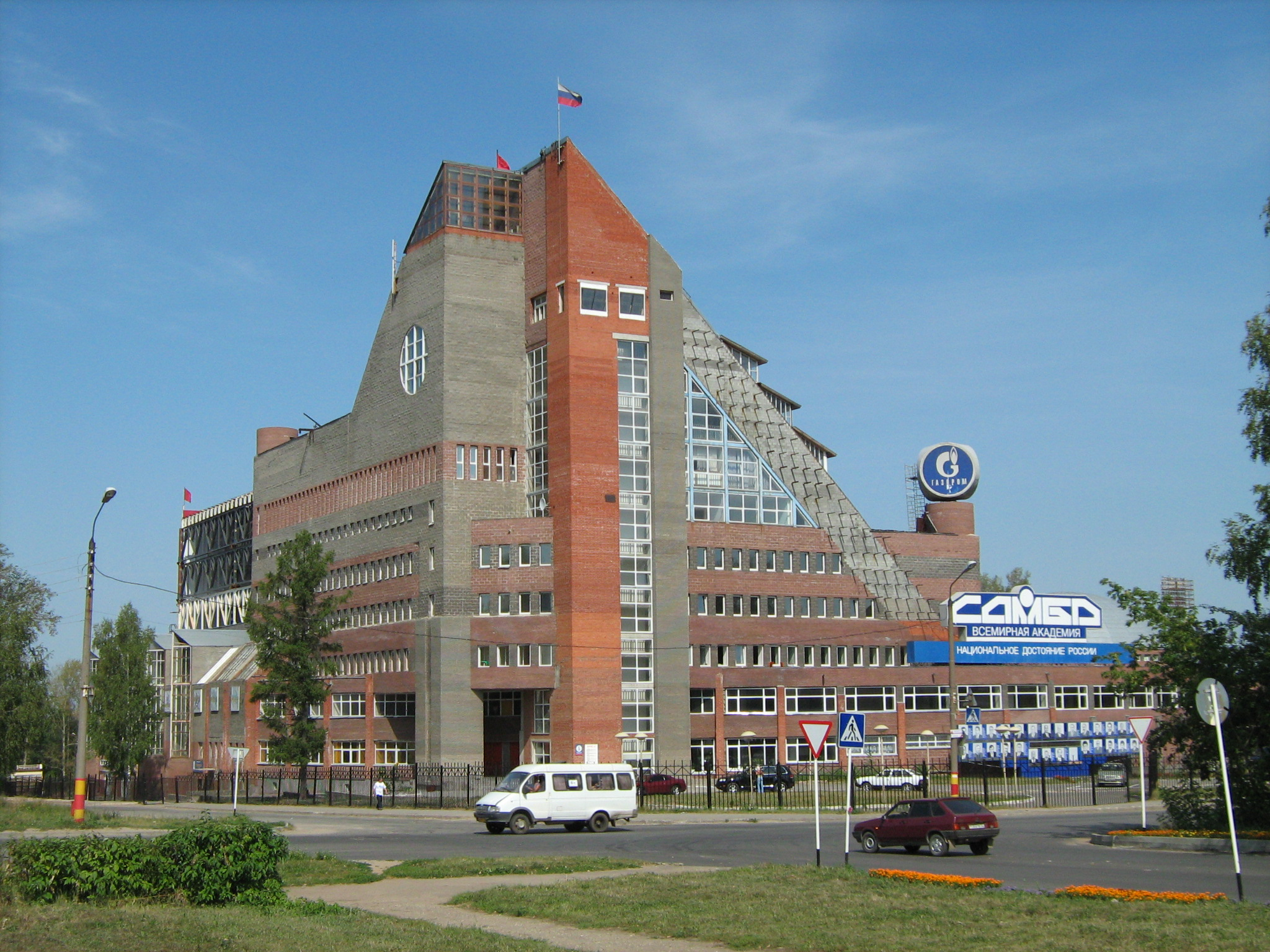
"The World Sambo Academy" in Kstovo, the venue of many Sambo competitions

Kstovo's best known sporting venue is The World Academy of Sambo, which has hosted many national and international Sambo wrestling competitions. Its origins go back to 1964, when the first local Sambo club was formed. In October 1976, a Sambo School building was opened on the western edge of the town; in 1995, in time for the Sambo World Cup, a new, taller building was constructed next to it, the facility becoming known as the "World Academy of Sambo".

== Religion ==
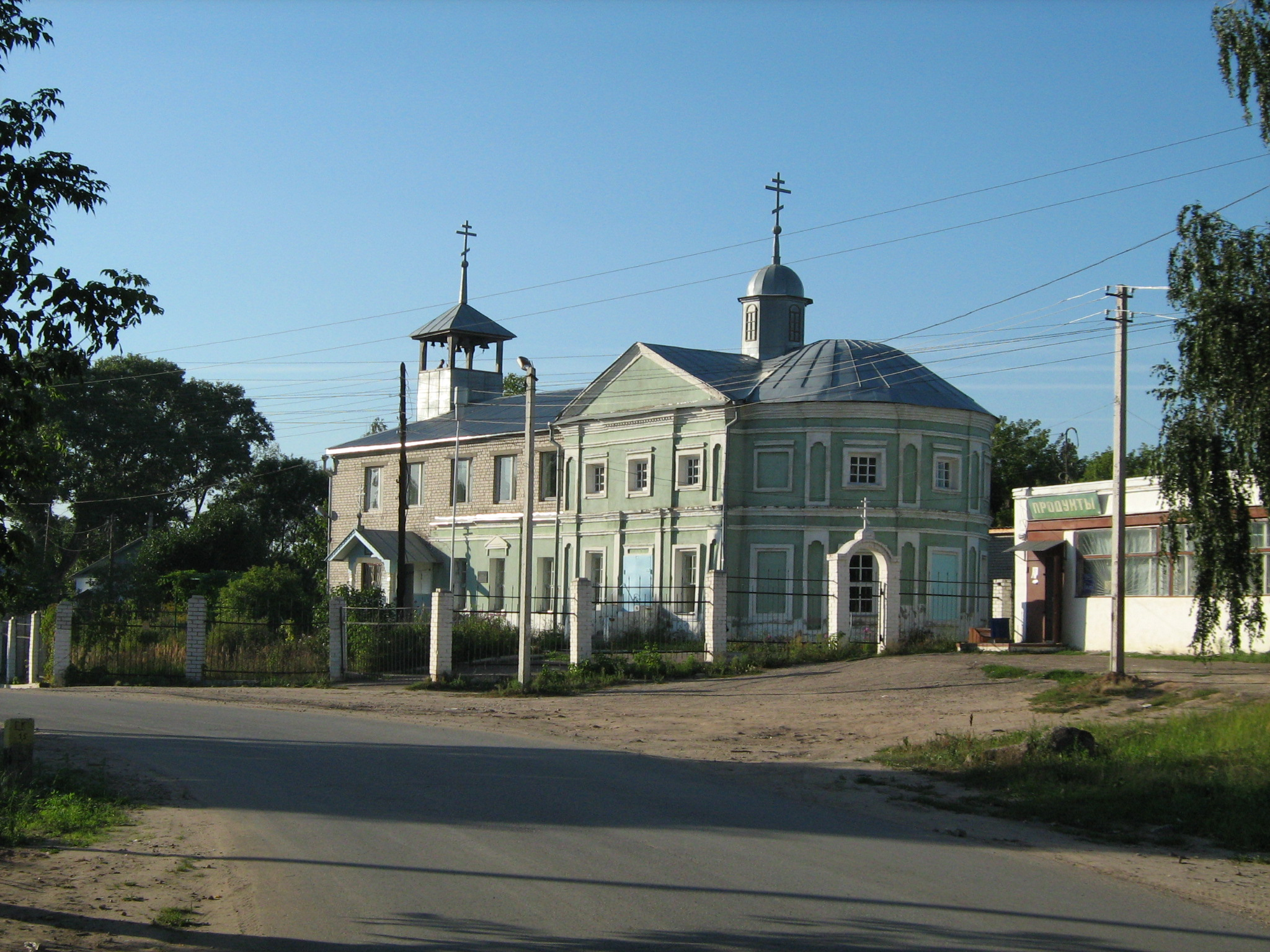
The Church of Our Lady of Kazan in Old Kstovo

Christians are served by four Orthodox churches in the town and immediately adjacent villages. The Church of Our Lady of Kazan in Old Kstovo was built in the late 19th century, closed during the Soviet era, when its building was used for a printshop, and re-opened in the early 1990s. A new church of Saint Sergius of Radonezh, located halfway between the Old and New Kstovo, was completed in 2016 and consecrated on September 14, 2016.

Closer to the town center is another Church of Our Lady of Kazan. Although it can be seen from many apartment buildings on Kstovo's new northeast side, this historic building (constructed in 1792 and is now protected as a heritage site) is actually located in the nearby village of Veliky Vrag just northeast of the town.

Finally, the Church of Our Lady of Vladimir, technically located in the village of Vishenki, is the closest to most of the city's residential neighborhoods.

== Notable people ==
- Artur Ryabokobylenko (born 1991 in Kstovo), football player
- Tatiana Shadrina (born 1974 in Kstovo), chess player
