= Seninskiye Dvoriki =

Seninskiye Dvoriki Сенинские Дворики
- Village
- Location within Vladimir Oblast Location within Russia
- Coordinates: 56°12′N 41°19′E
- Country: Russia
- Region: Vladimir Oblast
- District: Kovrovsky District
- Time zone: UTC+3:00

Seninskiye Dvoriki (Russian: Сенинские Дворики) is a rural locality (a village) in Novoselskoye Rural Settlement, Kovrovsky District, Vladimir Oblast, Russia. The population was 28 as of 2010.

== Geography ==
Seninskiye Dvoriki is located 30 km south of Kovrov (the district's administrative centre) by road. Nerekhta is the nearest rural locality.
