= Artur Ryabokobylenko =

Russian footballer

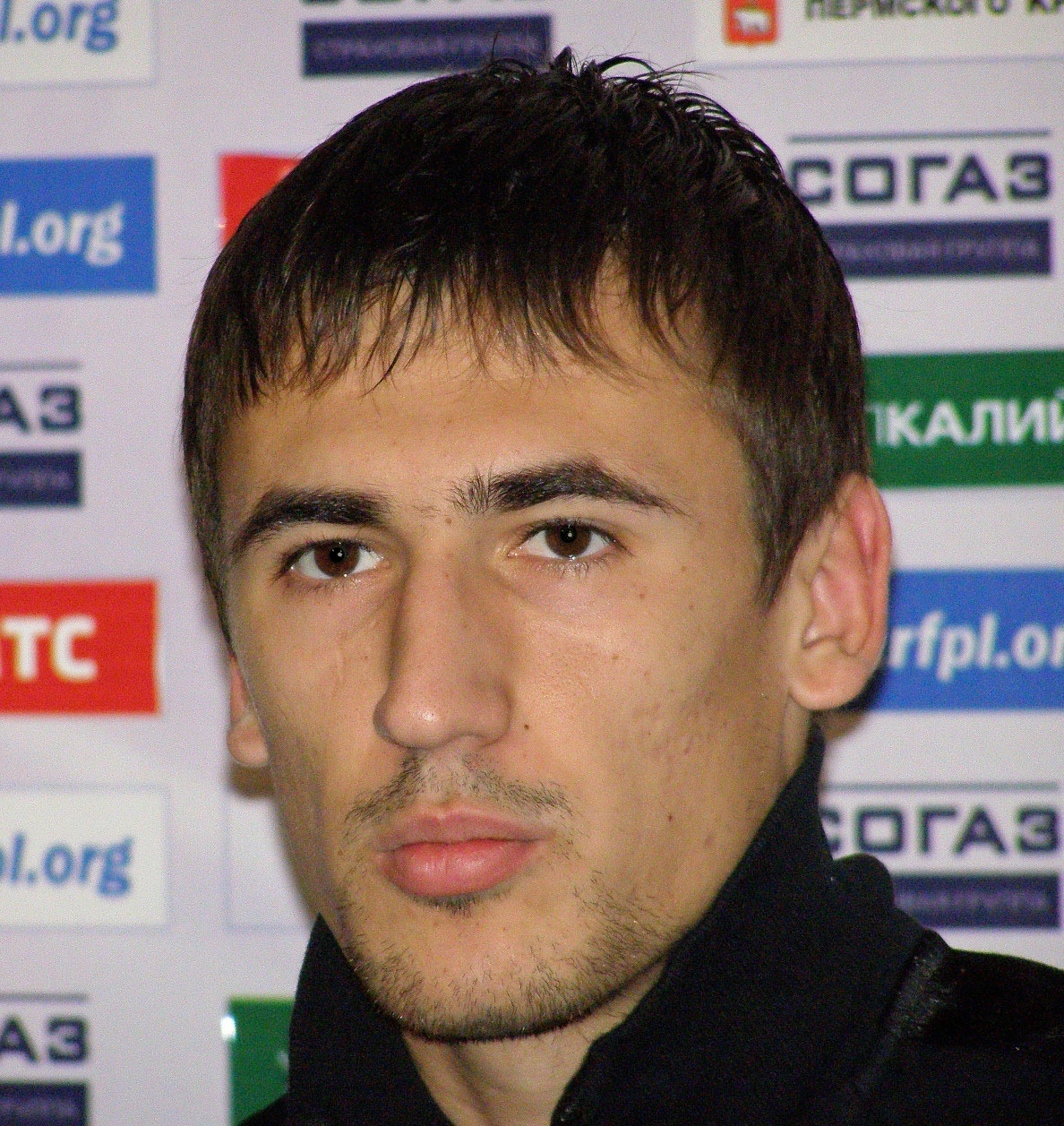

Personal information
- Full name: Artur Andreyevich Ryabokobylenko
- Date of birth: 5 April 1991 (age 35)
- Place of birth: Kstovo, Russian SFSR
- Height: 1.76 m (5 ft 9 in)
- Position: Midfielder

Youth career
- FC Spartak Moscow

Senior career*
Years	Team	Apps	(Gls)
2009–2014	FC Amkar Perm	19	(1)
2014	→ PFC Spartak Nalchik (loan)	11	(0)
2014–2015	FC Tosno	0	(0)
2014–2015	→ FC Sokol Saratov (loan)	7	(1)
2015–2016	FC Baltika Kaliningrad	35	(2)
2016–2019	FC Tyumen	97	(5)
2019–2020	FC Fakel Voronezh	23	(2)
2020–2021	FC Zvezda Perm	17	(2)
2021–2022	FC Tyumen	26	(0)
2022–2023	FC Sokol Saratov	24	(1)
2023	FC Zorkiy Krasnogorsk	15	(2)
- * Club domestic league appearances and goals

Artur Andreyevich Ryabokobylenko (Russian: Артур Андреевич Рябокобыленко; born 5 April 1991) is a Russian former professional football player.

== Club career ==
He made his Russian Premier League debut for FC Amkar Perm on 14 April 2012 in a game against FC Krylia Sovetov Samara.
