= Murashi, Perm Krai =

Murashi Мураши
- Village
- Location within Perm Krai Location within Russia
- Coordinates: 57°55′N 55°52′E
- Country: Russia
- Region: Perm Krai
- District: Permsky District
- Time zone: UTC+5:00

Murashi (Russian: Мураши) is a rural locality (a village) in Kultayevskoye Rural Settlement, Permsky District, Perm Krai, Russia. The population was 68 as of 2010. There are 7 streets.

== Geography ==
Murashi is located 28 km southwest of Perm (the district's administrative centre) by road. Nizhniye Mully is the nearest rural locality.
