= Koloksha (settlement) =

Koloksha Колокша
- Settlement
- Location within Vladimir Oblast Location within Russia
- Coordinates: 56°03′N 40°11′E
- Country: Russia
- Region: Vladimir Oblast
- District: Sobinsky District
- Time zone: UTC+3:00

Koloksha (Russian: Колокша) is a rural locality (a settlement) and the administrative center of Kolokshanskoye Rural Settlement, Sobinsky District, Vladimir Oblast, Russia. The population was 907 as of 2010. There are 10 streets.

== Geography ==
Koloksha is located 19 km northeast of Sobinka (the district's administrative centre) by road. Ustye is the nearest rural locality.
