= Leninskaya Sloboda =

Leninskaya Sloboda Ленинская Слобода
- Village
- Location within Vladimir Oblast Location within Russia
- Coordinates: 56°39′N 38°23′E
- Country: Russia
- Region: Vladimir Oblast
- District: Alexandrovsky District
- Time zone: UTC+3:00

Leninskaya Sloboda (Russian: Ленинская Слобода) is a rural locality (a village) in Krasnoplamenskoye Rural Settlement, Alexandrovsky District, Vladimir Oblast, Russia. The population was 24 as of 2010. There is 1 street.

== Geography ==
The village is located 16 km north-west from Krasnoye Plamya, 41 km north-west from Alexandrov.
