= Dvoriki =

Dvoriki Дворики
- Village
- Location within Vladimir Oblast Location within Russia
- Coordinates: 56°28′N 38°22′E
- Country: Russia
- Region: Vladimir Oblast
- District: Alexandrovsky District
- Time zone: UTC+3:00

Dvoriki (Russian: Дворики) is a rural locality (a village) in Krasnoplamenskoye Rural Settlement, Alexandrovsky District, Vladimir Oblast, Russia. The population was 21 as of 2010. There are 2 streets.

== Geography ==
Dvoriki is located 26 km northwest of Alexandrov (the district's administrative centre) by road. Ostashkino is the nearest rural locality.
