= Kstovsky District =

Kstovsky District Кстовский район (Russian)
- District
- A view of the Volga River from the selo of Bezvodnoye in Kstovsky District

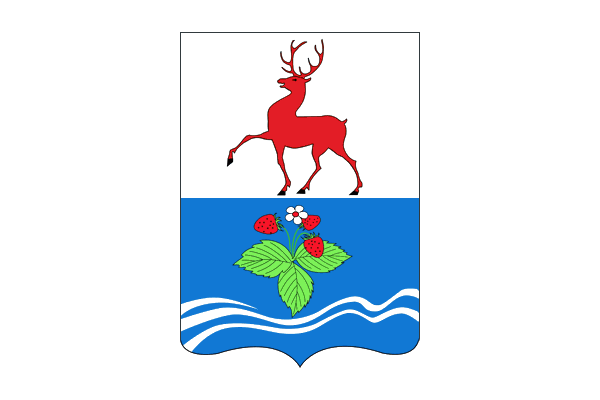
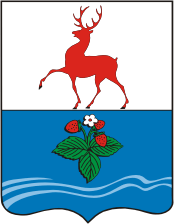
- Flag Coat of arms
- Location of Kstovsky District in Nizhny Novgorod Oblast
- Coordinates: 56°09′06″N 44°11′44″E
- Country: Russia
- Federal subject: Nizhny Novgorod Oblast
- Established: 1929
- Administrative center: Kstovo

Area
  - Total: 1,225 km^{2} (473 sq mi)

Population (2010 Census)
  - Total: 112,823
  - Density: 92.10/km^{2} (238.5/sq mi)
  - Urban: 59.1%
  - Rural: 40.9%

Administrative structure
  - Administrative divisions: 1 Towns of district significance, 13 Selsoviets
  - Inhabited localities: 1 cities/towns, 121 rural localities

Municipal structure
  - Municipally incorporated as: Kstovsky Municipal District
  - Municipal divisions: 1 urban settlements, 13 rural settlements
- Time zone: UTC+3 (MSK)
- OKTMO ID: 22637000
- Website: http://www.kstovo-adm.ru

Kstovsky District (Russian: Ксто́вский райо́н) is an administrative district (raion), one of the forty in Nizhny Novgorod Oblast, Russia. Municipally, it is incorporated as Kstovsky Municipal District. It is located in the center of the oblast. The area of the district is 1,225 square kilometers (473 sq mi). Its administrative center is the town of Kstovo. Population: 112,823 (2010 Census); 46,759 (2002 census); 47,917 (1989 Soviet census). The population of Kstovo accounts for 59.1% of the district's total population.

== Geography ==
Kstovsky District is located along the southern shore of the Volga River. The westernmost part of the district is adjacent to the city of Nizhny Novgorod. It is gradually becoming more suburban, its housing developments and shopping centers closely linked to the life of the city. The east of the district is more rural, with potato, root crops, and grain fields and cattle pastures alternating with forests and dacha areas.

== History ==
The district was established in 1929 and given its present name in 1930.

== Culture ==
Local historical sites include the Church of Our Lady of Kazan in the village of Veliky Vrag, just northeast of Kstovo. It was built in 1792 and is now protected as a heritage site, owned by the federal government.

== Economy ==
Most of the industry in the district is located in and around the town of Kstovo. The rest of the district is mostly agricultural, although the metalworking plant in Bezvodnoye and a brick factory in Afonino are well known in the region.

The construction of Gorky Nuclear District Heating Plant, which was meant to provide heating for a large part of Nizhny Novgorod, was started in the early 1980s in the western part of the district, near the Royka railway station and the village of Fedyakovo. A few years later, after the Chernobyl disaster, the construction stopped, and the large, almost completed building remains, as of 2006, mostly unused.

One of Nizhny Novgorod metropolitan area's largest shopping malls, anchored by an IKEA store and an Auchan hypermarket, is located near the same Fedyakovo, across the road from the uncompleted nuclear plant building. Located near both Nizhny Novgorod and Kstovo, the mall is connected to both cities by free shuttle buses.

== Notable residents ==
- Artur Ryabokobylenko (born 1991 in Kstovo), football player
- Tatiana Shadrina (born 1974 in Kstovo), chess player
