= 2017–18 FC Amkar Perm season =

Amkar Perm
2017–18 season
- Chairman: Gennady Shilov
- Manager: Gadzhi Gadzhiyev
- Stadium: Zvezda Stadium
- Premier League: 13th
- Russian Cup: Quarterfinal vs Avangard Kursk
- Top goalscorer: League: Three Players (3); All: Janusz Gol (4)
Home colours	Away colours	Third colours

The 2017–18 Amkar Perm season was their 14th season in the Russian Premier League, the highest tier of association football in Russia, following promotion during the 2003 season. They will participate in the Russian Premier League and Russian Cup.

== Squad ==
Note: Flags indicate national team as defined under FIFA eligibility rules; some limited exceptions apply. Players may hold more than one non-FIFA nationality.

No.	Pos.	Nation	Player
1	GK	RUS	Artur Nigmatullin
2	DF	SRB	Aleksandar Miljković
3	DF	BUL	Petar Zanev (Captain)
4	DF	RUS	Nikolai Zaytsev
5	MF	POL	Janusz Gol
6	DF	GUI	Sékou Condé
8	MF	NGR	Fegor Ogude
9	FW	AUT	Darko Bodul
10	MF	RUS	Alikhan Shavayev
11	FW	RUS	Aleksei Gasilin
13	DF	RUS	Kirill Suslov
14	FW	RUS	Stanislav Prokofyev
15	GK	RUS	Dmitri Khomich
16	MF	BLR	Syarhey Balanovich

No.	Pos.	Nation	Player
17	MF	RUS	Mikhail Gashchenkov
18	DF	BLR	Mikhail Sivakow
19	DF	NGR	Brian Idowu
20	MF	RUS	Pavel Komolov
26	FW	CRC	Felicio Brown Forbes
27	MF	RUS	Mikhail Kostyukov
32	MF	RUS	Ivan Melnikov
33	MF	RUS	Daniil Zuyev
41	DF	RUS	Dmitri Belorukov
66	MF	IRI	Saeid Ezatolahi (loan from Rostov)
77	FW	RUS	Aleksandr Salugin
80	FW	NGR	Aaron Olanare (loan from CSKA Moscow)
91	MF	RUS	Aleksandr Ryazantsev (loan from Zenit St. Petersburg)
95	GK	RUS	Denis Vambolt

=== Youth squad ===
Note: Flags indicate national team as defined under FIFA eligibility rules; some limited exceptions apply. Players may hold more than one non-FIFA nationality.

No.	Pos.	Nation	Player
29	DF	RUS	Rinat Guseynov
30	DF	RUS	Rustam Vazitdinov
31	FW	RUS	Arseni Pavlenko
34	DF	RUS	Mikhail Kondrashov
35	DF	RUS	Aleksandr Mosunov
36	DF	RUS	Dmitri Chaadayev
37	DF	RUS	Maksim Luzin
41	GK	RUS	Roman Pshukov
44	MF	RUS	Viktor Urensky
46	MF	RUS	Georgi Yenev
47	FW	RUS	Maksim Zhukovsky
49	DF	RUS	Aleksandr Link
57	MF	RUS	Daniil Frentsel

No.	Pos.	Nation	Player
68	MF	RUS	Timofey Kraev
70	FW	RUS	Anton Googe
71	GK	RUS	Anatoli Krasilnikov
72	FW	RUS	Aleksandr Melekhov
73	MF	RUS	Nikolai Smetskoy
74	DF	RUS	Gleb Burkov
78	MF	RUS	Artyom Filippov
90	DF	RUS	Yegor Skryabin
92	DF	RUS	Danil Smirnov
94	DF	RUS	Aleksandr Bushmin
96	MF	RUS	Vadim Chukhlantsev
97	DF	RUS	Khavazh Aushev
99	GK	RUS	Yegor Sedov

=== Out on loan ===
Note: Flags indicate national team as defined under FIFA eligibility rules; some limited exceptions apply. Players may hold more than one non-FIFA nationality.

No.	Pos.	Nation	Player
—	MF	RUS	Ivan Belikov (on loan to (Belarus) Naftan Novopolotsk)
—	MF	RUS	Vasili Aleynikov (on loan to (Russia) Tom Tomsk)

== Transfers ==
=== Summer ===
In: Note: Flags indicate national team as defined under FIFA eligibility rules; some limited exceptions apply. Players may hold more than one non-FIFA nationality.

No.	Pos.	Nation	Player
1	GK	RUS	Artur Nigmatullin (from (Russia) Tosno)
17	MF	RUS	Mikhail Gashchenkov (from (Russia) Khimki)
18	DF	BLR	Mikhail Sivakow (from (Russia) Orenburg)
21	DF	RUS	Vasili Aleynikov (end of loan to (Russia) Pskov-747)
23	FW	MNE	Drago Milović (from (Montenegro) Hajduk Bar)
26	FW	CRC	Felicio Brown Forbes (from (Russia) Arsenal Tula)
31	FW	RUS	Arseni Pavlenko
32	MF	RUS	Ivan Melnikov (from (Russia) Torpedo Moscow)
36	DF	RUS	Dmitri Chaadayev
37	DF	RUS	Maksim Luzin
41	DF	RUS	Dmitri Belorukov (on loan from (Russia) Dynamo Moscow)
49	DF	RUS	Aleksandr Link
50	GK	RUS	Dmitri Bashkirtsev
55	DF	RUS	Stepan Ostanin
57	MF	RUS	Daniil Frentsel
60	MF	RUS	Denis Fedorochev
66	MF	IRI	Saeid Ezatolahi (on loan from (Russia) Rostov)
67	MF	RUS	Maksim Sedov
76	MF	RUS	Timur Farrakhov
91	MF	RUS	Aleksandr Ryazantsev (on loan from (Russia) Zenit St. Petersburg)
99	GK	RUS	Yegor Sedov (from (Russia) Anzhi Makhachkala)

Out: Note: Flags indicate national team as defined under FIFA eligibility rules; some limited exceptions apply. Players may hold more than one non-FIFA nationality.

No.	Pos.	Nation	Player
7	FW	UKR	Anton Shynder
13	MF	RUS	Roland Gigolayev (to (Russia) Akhmat Grozny)
23	DF	RUS	Ivan Cherenchikov (to (Russia) Baltika Kaliningrad)
25	MF	RUS	David Khurtsidze (to (Georgia (country)) Torpedo Kutaisi)
33	MF	SRB	Branko Jovičić (to (Serbia) Red Star Belgrade)
34	DF	RUS	Mikhail Kondrashov
37	DF	RUS	Nikolai Tarasov (to (Russia) Dynamo-2 St. Petersburg)
40	MF	RUS	Vladislav Razdelkin (to (Russia) Titan Klin)
41	GK	RUS	Roman Pshukov (to (Russia) Biolog-Novokubansk)
51	DF	RUS	Nikita Romaschenko (to (Russia) Khimik Novomoskovsk)
72	FW	RUS	Aleksandr Melekhov
90	DF	RUS	Yegor Skryabin
94	DF	RUS	Aleksandr Bushmin
98	GK	RUS	Aleksandr Budakov (to (Russia) Anzhi Makhachkala)
99	MF	UKR	Oleh Mishchenko (to (Ukraine) Mariupol)
—	DF	RUS	Soslan Takazov (to (Russia) Volgar Astrakhan, previously on loan)
—	MF	RUS	Ivan Belikov (to (Russia) Khimki, previously on loan to (Belarus) Naftan Novopolotsk)
—	MF	RUS	David Dzakhov (to (Russia) Orenburg, previously on loan to (Russia) Shinnik Yaroslavl)

=== Winter ===
In: Note: Flags indicate national team as defined under FIFA eligibility rules; some limited exceptions apply. Players may hold more than one non-FIFA nationality.

No.	Pos.	Nation	Player
13	DF	RUS	Kirill Suslov (from (Norway) Kongsvinger)
33	MF	RUS	Daniil Zuyev (from (Russia) Rubin Yalta)
40	FW	RUS	Daniil Uldanov
80	FW	NGR	Aaron Olanare (on loan from (Russia) CSKA Moscow)
88	DF	RUS	Aleksandr Bakharev

Out: Note: Flags indicate national team as defined under FIFA eligibility rules; some limited exceptions apply. Players may hold more than one non-FIFA nationality.

No.	Pos.	Nation	Player
21	MF	RUS	Vasili Aleynikov (on loan to (Russia) Tom Tomsk)
23	FW	MNE	Drago Milović
30	DF	RUS	Rustam Vazitdinov
59	MF	RUS	Yevgeni Paramonov
63	GK	RUS	Daniil Arzhevitin
80	MF	RUS	Andrei Trunin

== Competitions ==
=== Russian Premier League ===
==== Results by round ====
Round	1	2	3	4	5	6	7	8	9	10	11	12	13	14	15	16	17	18	19	20	21	22	23	24	25	26	27	28	29	30
Ground	A	A	H	A	H	A	H	A	H	A	H	A	H	A	H	H	A	H	A	H	A	H	H	A	H	A	A	H	A	H
Result	L	L	L	L	D	D	L	W	L	W	W	W	D	D	D	L	D	W	L	L	D	L	W	W	L	L	W	L	W	D
Position	13	14	14	15	16	16	16	16	16	14	11	9	12	12	12	12	12	11	11	13	14	14	13	12	13	13	13	13	13	13

Updated to match(es) played on 13 May 2017. Source: See Results
A = Away; H = Home; W = Win; D = Draw; L = Loss

==== Results ====
16 July 2017 1	Akhmat Grozny	1 – 0	Amkar Perm	Grozny
23:30 YEKT (UTC+5)	Jabá 39'; Ravanelli (yellow card) 79'; Kadyrov (yellow card) 85'	Report	Sivakow (yellow card) 15'; Kostyukov (yellow card) 77'; Zanev (yellow card) 79'; Gasilin (yellow card) 90+2'	Stadium: Akhmat-Arena; Attendance: 29,450; Referee: Kirill Levnikov

21 July 2017 2	Amkar Perm	1 – 0	Anzhi Makhachkala	Kaspiysk
21:30 YEKT (UTC+5)	Bryzgalov (yellow card) 11' (goal) 23'; Poluyakhtov (yellow card) 45'	Report	Gigolayev (yellow card) 39'; Sivakow (yellow card) 46'; Condé (yellow card) 75'; Salugin (yellow card) 85'; Kostyukov (yellow card) 89'	Stadium: Anzhi Arena; Attendance: 6,207; Referee: Vladislav Bezborodov

30 July 2017 3	Amkar Perm	0 – 1	Rostov	Perm
17:00 YEKT (UTC+5)	Gol (yellow card) 90+2'	Report	Zuyev 66'; Yusupov (yellow card) 81'	Stadium: Zvezda Stadium; Attendance: 4,900; Referee: Aleksei Nikolaev

5 August 2017 4	Dynamo Moscow	3 – 0	Amkar Perm	Moscow
19:30 YEKT (UTC+5)	Panchenko 49'; Zotov 64'; Wánderson 82'	Report	Zaytsev (yellow card) 42'; Salugin (yellow card) 76'; Condé (yellow card) 90+1'	Stadium: Arena Khimki; Attendance: 5,423; Referee: Evgeny Turbin

8 August 2017 5	Amkar Perm	0 – 0	Ufa	Perm
19:30 YEKT (UTC+5)	Miljković (yellow card) 25'; Zanev (yellow card) 52'	Report	Jokić (yellow card) 78'; Alikin (yellow card) 89'	Stadium: Zvezda Stadium; Attendance: 4,900; Referee: Igor Fedotov

13 August 2017 6	Krasnodar	1 – 1	Amkar Perm	Krasnodar
22:00 YEKT (UTC+5)	Claesson 25'	Report	Gashchenkov 76'; Kostyukov (yellow card) 83'; Nigmatullin (yellow card) 90+2'	Stadium: Krasnodar Stadium; Attendance: 17,367; Referee: Roman Galimov

20 August 2017 7	Amkar Perm	0 – 1	Zenit St.Petersburg	Perm
17:00 YEKT (UTC+5)	Idowu (yellow card) 63'	Report	Kokorin 61'; Kranevitter (yellow card) 84'; Lunyov (yellow card) 90+1'	Stadium: Zvezda Stadium; Attendance: 11,345; Referee: Aleksei Matyunin

26 August 2017 8	Arsenal Tula	0 – 1	Amkar Perm	Tula
17:00 YEKT (UTC+5)	Sunzu (yellow card) 50'; Belyayev (yellow card) 75'	Report	Ryazantsev 21'; Nigmatullin (yellow card) 90'	Stadium: Arsenal Stadium; Attendance: 10,870; Referee: Evgeny Turbin

8 September 2017 9	Amkar Perm	0 – 1	CSKA Moscow	Perm
19:30 YEKT (UTC+5)	Gol (yellow card) 13'; Belorukov (yellow card) 45+1'; Zanev (yellow card) 55'; Idowu (yellow card) 84' (yellow-red card) 90'	Report	Zhamaletdinov 52'; Wernbloom (yellow card) 77'; Kuchayev (yellow card) 84'	Stadium: Zvezda Stadium; Attendance: 7,680; Referee: Sergey Ivanov

18 September 2017 10	Lokomotiv Moscow	0 – 1	Amkar Perm	Moscow
21:30 YEKT (UTC+5)	Pejčinović (yellow card) 39'	Report	Gashchenkov 1'; Belorukov (yellow card) 14'; Condé (yellow card) 64'	Stadium: RZD Arena; Attendance: 9,860; Referee: Kirill Levnikov

25 September 2017 11	Amkar Perm	3 – 0	SKA-Khabarovsk	Perm
19:00 YEKT (UTC+5)	Gol 38'; Bodul 84'; Zaytsev (yellow card) 90+2'; Komolov 90+3'	Report	Ediyev (yellow card) 68'	Stadium: Zvezda Stadium; Attendance: 3,890; Referee: Vladimir Moskalyov

30 September 2017 12	Rubin Kazan	0 – 1	Amkar Perm	Kazan
18:30 YEKT (UTC+5)	M'Vila (yellow card) 57'; Granat (yellow card) 60'	Report	Miljković (yellow card) 57'; Gol (yellow card) 63' (goal) 83'; Nigmatullin (yellow card) 85'	Stadium: Kazan Arena; Attendance: 5,614; Referee: Mikhail Vilkov

16 October 2017 13	Amkar Perm	0 – 0	Tosno	Perm
19:30 YEKT (UTC+5)	Ezatolahi (yellow card) 19'; Belorukov (yellow card) 75'; Miljković (yellow card) 90+3'	Report	Mirzov (yellow card) 5'; Kutin (yellow card) 13'; Chernov (yellow card) 65'; Poletanović (yellow card) 80'	Stadium: Zvezda Stadium; Attendance: 3,456; Referee: Aleksei Matyunin

21 October 2017 14	Spartak Moscow	0 – 0	Amkar Perm	Moscow
21:00 YEKT (UTC+5)		Report	Gashchenkov (yellow card) 65'; Idowu (yellow card) 85'	Stadium: Otkrytiye Arena; Attendance: 25,754; Referee: Pavel Kukuyan

29 October 2017 15	Amkar Perm	1 – 1	Ural Yekaterinburg	Perm
13:30 YEKT (UTC+5)	Sivakow 22' (pen.); Ogude (yellow card) 77'	Report	Ilyin (yellow card) 23'; Yevseyev 48'	Stadium: Zvezda Stadium; Attendance: 4,870; Referee: Igor Fedotov

5 November 2017 16	Amkar Perm	1 – 2	Anzhi Makhachkala	Perm
16:00 YEKT (UTC+5)	Kostyukov 12' (yellow card) 34'; Condé (yellow card) 41'; Bodul (yellow card) 51'; Idowu (yellow card) 57'; Gashchenkov (yellow card) 73'	Report	Markelov 6', 28' (yellow card) 21' (yellow-red card) 63'; Tetrashvili (yellow card) 78'; Katsayev (yellow card) 84'	Stadium: Zvezda Stadium; Attendance: 4,200; Referee: Vladimir Moskalyov

19 November 2017 17	Rostov	0 – 0	Amkar Perm	Rostov-on-Don
18:30 YEKT (UTC+5)	Gațcan (yellow card) 33'; Ingason (penalty missed) 79'	Report	Zaytsev (yellow card) 27'; Belorukov (yellow card) 65'; Idowu (yellow card) 79'; Sivakow (penalty missed) 90+2'	Stadium: Olimp-2; Attendance: 5,135; Referee: Evgeny Turbin

24 November 2017 18	Amkar Perm	2 – 1	Dynamo Moscow	Perm
19:30 YEKT (UTC+5)	Gol 48'; Ezatolahi 68'; Zaytsev (yellow card) 90+2'	Report	Sosnin (yellow card) 18'; Sow (yellow card) 43'; Lutsenko 54' (pen.) (yellow card) 60'; Shunin (yellow card) 69'; Tsallagov (yellow card) 76'	Stadium: Zvezda Stadium; Attendance: 4,890; Referee: Artem Chistyakov

3 December 2017 19	Ufa	3 – 0	Amkar Perm	Ufa
15:00 YEKT (UTC+5)	Sly 53', 69'; Jokić (yellow card) 63'; Oblyakov 80'; Nikitin (yellow card) 85'; Safronidi (yellow card) 90+3'	Report		Stadium: Neftyanik Stadium; Attendance: 5,924; Referee: Vladimir Seldyakov

10 December 2017 20	Amkar Perm	1 – 3	Krasnodar	Perm
16:00 YEKT (UTC+5)	Forbes 57'; Bodul (yellow card) 59'	Report	Gritsayenko 13'; Ignatyev 32'; Claesson 46'; Martynovich (yellow card) 72'	Stadium: Zvezda Stadium; Attendance: 2,684; Referee: Mikhail Vilkov

3 March 2018 21	Zenit St.Petersburg	0 – 0	Amkar Perm	Saint Petersburg
16:30 MSK (UTC+3)	Yerokhin (yellow card) 7' (yellow-red card) 67'; Zabolotny (yellow card) 71'; Criscito (yellow card) 78' (yellow-red card) 90+4'; Paredes (yellow card) 90+3'	Report	Zaytsev (yellow card) 22' (yellow-red card) 90+7'; Gashchenkov (yellow card) 26'; Ezatolahi (yellow card) 82'; Nigmatullin (yellow card) 90+1'	Stadium: Krestovsky Stadium; Attendance: 41,543; Referee: Vladimir Seldyakov

9 March 2018 22	Amkar Perm	0 – 2	Arsenal Tula	Perm
16:00 YEKT (UTC+5)	Belorukov (yellow card) 67' (yellow-red card) 80'; Ogude (red card) 76'	Report	Dzyuba (penalty missed) 11' 11' (yellow card) 67'; Kangwa (yellow card) 58' (penalty missed) 81'; Tkachyov 83'	Stadium: Zvezda Stadium; Attendance: 1,089; Referee: Mikhail Vilkov

31 March 2018 24	Amkar Perm	2 – 1	Lokomotiv Moscow	Moscow
16:00 YEKT (UTC+5)	Miljković (yellow card) 36'; Olanare 48' (pen.), 59'	Report	Fernandes 16' (pen.); Denisov (yellow card) 52' (yellow-red card) 90+1'	Stadium: RZD Arena; Attendance: 8,837; Referee: Sergey Lapochkin

7 April 2018 25	SKA-Khabarovsk	0 – 2	Amkar Perm	Khabarovsk
13:00 YEKT (UTC+5)	Kabutov (red card) 56'	Report	Ryazantsev 45+1'; Kostyukov 90+2'; Condé (yellow card) 90+2'	Stadium: Lenin Stadium; Attendance: 4,897; Referee: Vladislav Bezborodov

14 April 2018 26	Amkar Perm	0 – 3	Rubin Kazan	Perm
13:30 YEKT (UTC+5)	Ogude (yellow card) 24'; Bodul (yellow card) 62'	Report	Azmoun 24', 39' (yellow card) 45+1'; Sorokin (yellow card) 56'; Kuzmin 77'	Stadium: Zvezda Stadium; Attendance: 5,768; Referee: Igor Fedotov

18 April 2018 23	CSKA Moscow	3 – 0	Amkar Perm	Moscow
22:30 YEKT (UTC+5)	Vitinho 44'; Chalov 45+1', 61'	Report	Idowu (yellow card) 71'	Stadium: VEB Arena; Attendance: 8,016; Referee: Aleksey Sukhoy

22 April 2018 27	Tosno	0 – 2	Amkar Perm	Saint Petersburg
18:30 YEKT (UTC+5)	Mirzov (yellow card) 73'; Buivolov (yellow card) 77'	Report	Ryazantsev 17' (pen.); Ezatolahi (yellow card) 87'; Gol (yellow card) 87'; Nigmatullin (yellow card) 90+1'; Kostyukov 90+2'	Stadium: Petrovsky Stadium; Attendance: 4,331; Referee: Aleksey Eskov

29 April 2018 28	Amkar Perm	0 – 2	Spartak Moscow	Perm
16:00 YEKT (UTC+5)	Komolov (yellow card) 31'; Ezatolahi (yellow card) 42'; Sivakow (yellow card) 43'	Report	Bocchetti 8' (yellow card) 31'; Timofeyev (yellow card) 28'; Hanni 81'	Stadium: Zvezda Stadium; Attendance: 7,890; Referee: Kirill Levnikov

6 May 2018 29	Ural Yekaterinburg	0 – 2	Amkar Perm	Yekaterinburg
16:00 YEKT (UTC+5)	Dantsev (yellow card) 7'; Bicfalvi (yellow card) 15' (penalty missed) 78'; Boumal (yellow card) 54'	Report	Zanev 44' (yellow card) 57'; Gol (yellow card) 62'; Olanare (yellow card) 80'; Miljković (yellow card) 85'; Forbes 90+4'	Stadium: SKB-Bank Arena; Attendance: 20,800; Referee: Vitaly Meshkov

13 May 2018 30	Amkar Perm	0 – 0	Akhmat Grozny	Perm
16:00 YEKT (UTC+5)	Kostyukov (yellow card) 82'; Bodul (yellow card) 84'	Report	Ángel (yellow card) 50' (yellow-red card)	Stadium: Zvezda Stadium; Referee: Aleksei Nikolaev

==== League table ====
Pos	Team	Pld	W	D	L	GF	GA	GD	Pts	Qualification or relegation
11	Rostov	30	9	10	11	27	28	−1	37 (Note: Head-to-head: Rostov 1–0 Ural, Ural 1–1 Rostov)	
12	Ural Yekaterinburg	30	8	13	9	31	32	−1	37	
13	Amkar Perm (D)	30	9	8	13	20	30	−10	35	Dissolved after the season (Note: On 13 June 2018, FC Amkar Perm announced that the Russian Football Union recalled their 2018–19 season license, making them ineligible for the Russian Premier League or Russian Football National League. On 18 June 2018, club president Gennadi Shilov announced that the club will not register for the third-tier Russian Professional Football League and will be dissolved. As a consequence, Anzhi Makhachkala was not relegated.)
14	Anzhi Makhachkala	30	6	6	18	31	55	−24	24 (Note: Head-to-head: Anzhi 2–0 Tosno, Tosno 2–2 Anzhi)	Qualification for the Relegation play-offs
15	Tosno (D)	30	6	6	18	23	54	−31	24	Dissolved after the season (Note: On 30 May 2018, Russian Football National League announced that FC Tosno failed in its appeal to obtain the FNL license for the 2018–19 season. On 9 June 2018, the founder of FORT Group (the company that owned the team), Maxim Levchenko, announced that the team is officially dissolved.)

Updated to match(es) played on 13 May 2018. Source: Russian Premier League, Soccerway
Rules for classification: 1) Points; 2) Head-to-head points; 3) Head-to-head matches won; 4) Head-to-head goal difference; 5) Head-to-head goals scored; 6) Head-to-head away goals; 7) Matches won; 8) Goal difference; 9) Goals scored; 10) Away goals scored.
(D) Dissolved after the season

==== Relegation play-offs ====
17 May 2018 1st Leg	Amkar Perm	2 – 0	Tambov	Perm
19:30 YEKT (UTC+5)	Gol 60'; Gashchenkov (yellow card) 75'; Balanovich 79'	Report	Gultyayev (yellow card) 74'	Stadium: Zvezda Stadium; Attendance: 13,478; Referee: Sergey Lapochkin

20 May 2018 2nd Leg	Tambov	0 – 1 (0 – 3 agg.)	Amkar Perm	Tambov
20:00 YEKT (UTC+5)	Shlyakov (yellow card) 23'; Kašćelan (yellow card) 84'	Report	Kostyukov (yellow card) 29' (goal) 38'; Ogude (yellow card) 33'; Forbes (yellow card) 43'; Idowu (yellow card) 55'; Gol (yellow card) 82'	Stadium: Spartak Stadium; Referee: Roman Galimov

=== Russian Cup ===
21 September 2017 Round of 32	Fakel Voronezh	0 – 4	Amkar Perm	Voronezh
21:00 YEKT (UTC+5)		Report	Prokofyev 7', 82'; Ezatolahi (yellow card) 20'; Sivakow 63'; Bodul (yellow card) 72'; Ryazantsev 76'	Stadium: Trade Unions Central Stadium; Attendance: 6,100; Referee: Aleksandr Borisov

25 October 2017 Round of 16	Rostov	1 – 1 (a.e.t.) (9 – 10 p)	Amkar Perm	Rostov-on-Don
20:30 YEKT (UTC+5)	Parshivlyuk 39'	Report	Idowu 16'; Condé (yellow card) 109'	Stadium: Olimp-2; Attendance: 4,827; Referee: Aleksey Sukhoy
	Penalties
	Shomurodov (penalty scored); Bukharov (penalty scored); Doumbia (penalty missed); Ingason (penalty scored); Gațcan (penalty missed); Majer (penalty scored); Parshivlyuk (penalty scored); Makeyev (penalty scored); Wilusz (penalty scored); Ustinov (penalty scored); Pesyakov (penalty scored); Shomurodov (penalty missed)		Bodul (penalty missed); Balanovich (penalty scored); Melnikov (penalty scored); Prokofyev (penalty missed); Sivakow (penalty scored); Ogude (penalty scored); Belorukov (penalty scored); Condé (penalty scored); Zaytsev (penalty scored); Miljković (penalty scored); Nigmatullin (penalty scored); Bodul (penalty scored)

27 February 2018 Quarterfinal	Amkar Perm	0 – 0 (a.e.t.) (6 – 7 p)	Avangard Kursk	Perm
19:30 YEKT (UTC+5)	Kostyukov (yellow card) 31'; Gol (yellow card) 58'; Idowu (yellow card) 90'; Komolov (yellow card) 113'	Report		Stadium: Zvezda Stadium; Attendance: 2,000; Referee: Kirill Levnikov
	Penalties
	Zanev (penalty scored); Gashchenkov (penalty scored); Sivakow (penalty missed); Bodul (penalty scored); Nigmatullin (penalty scored); Komolov (penalty missed); Olanare (penalty scored); Balanovich (penalty scored); Idowu (penalty missed)		(penalty scored) Korobov; (penalty missed) Gotsuk; (penalty scored) Dashayev; (penalty scored) Sinyayev; (penalty scored) Gurfov; (penalty missed) Nikitin; (penalty scored) Mitasov; (penalty scored) Netfullin; (penalty scored) Tlupov

== Squad statistics ==
As of Match played 20 May 2018

=== Appearances and goals ===
No.	Pos	Nat	Player	Total		Premier League		Russian Cup		Playoff	
No.	Pos	Nat	Player	Apps	Goals	Apps	Goals	Apps	Goals	Apps	Goals
1	GK	(Russia) RUS	Artur Nigmatullin	33	0	29	0	2	0	2	0
2	DF	(Serbia) SRB	Aleksandar Miljković	28	0	25+1	0	1	0	1	0
3	DF	(Bulgaria) BUL	Petar Zanev	28	1	24	1	2	0	2	0
4	DF	(Russia) RUS	Nikolai Zaytsev	16	0	14	0	1+1	0	0	0
5	MF	(Poland) POL	Janusz Gol	30	4	21+5	3	2	0	2	1
6	DF	(Guinea) GUI	Sékou Condé	23	0	18+2	0	2	0	1	0
8	MF	(Nigeria) NGR	Fegor Ogude	19	0	9+6	0	2	0	2	0
9	FW	(Austria) AUT	Darko Bodul	28	1	12+13	1	2+1	0	0	0
10	MF	(Russia) RUS	Alikhan Shavayev	6	0	2+3	0	1	0	0	0
11	FW	(Russia) RUS	Aleksei Gasilin	6	0	2+4	0	0	0	0	0
13	MF	(Russia) RUS	Roland Gigolayev	4	0	2+1	0	0	0	0+1	0
14	FW	(Russia) RUS	Stanislav Prokofyev	11	2	6+3	0	1+1	2	0	0
15	GK	(Russia) RUS	Dmitri Khomich	2	0	1	0	1	0	0	0
16	MF	(Belarus) BLR	Syarhey Balanovich	20	1	12+4	0	1+1	0	0+2	1
17	MF	(Russia) RUS	Mikhail Gashchenkov	27	2	13+10	2	1+2	0	0+1	0
18	DF	(Belarus) BLR	Mikhail Sivakow	30	2	24+1	1	3	1	2	0
19	DF	(Nigeria) NGR	Brian Idowu	32	1	26+1	0	3	1	2	0
20	MF	(Russia) RUS	Pavel Komolov	26	1	20+3	1	1	0	2	0
26	FW	(Costa Rica) CRC	Felicio Brown Forbes	16	2	5+8	2	1	0	2	0
27	MF	(Russia) RUS	Mikhail Kostyukov	23	4	7+11	3	3	0	1+1	1
32	MF	(Russia) RUS	Ivan Melnikov	7	0	2+4	0	0+1	0	0	0
41	DF	(Russia) RUS	Dmitri Belorukov	23	0	18+1	0	1+1	0	2	0
66	MF	(Iran) IRI	Saeid Ezatolahi	16	1	12+3	1	1	0	0	0
77	FW	(Russia) RUS	Aleksandr Salugin	5	0	2+3	0	0	0	0	0
80	FW	(Nigeria) NGR	Aaron Olanare	9	2	7+1	2	1	0	0	0
91	MF	(Russia) RUS	Aleksandr Ryazantsev	22	4	17+2	3	0+1	1	1+1	0
Players away from the club on loan:
Players who left Amkar Perm during the season:

=== Goal scorers ===
Place	Position	Nation	Number	Name	Premier League	Russian Cup	Playoff	Total
1	MF	(Russia)	91	Aleksandr Ryazantsev	3	1	0	4
1	MF	(Poland)	5	Janusz Gol	3	0	1	4
1	MF	(Russia)	27	Mikhail Kostyukov	3	0	1	4
4	MF	(Russia)	17	Mikhail Gashchenkov	2	0	0	2
4	FW	(Nigeria)	80	Aaron Olanare	2	0	0	2
4	FW	(Costa Rica)	26	Felicio Brown Forbes	2	0	0	2
4	DF	(Belarus)	18	Mikhail Sivakow	1	1	0	2
4	FW	(Russia)	14	Stanislav Prokofyev	0	2	0	2
9	FW	(Austria)	9	Darko Bodul	1	0	0	1
9	MF	(Russia)	20	Pavel Komolov	1	0	0	1
9	DF	(Nigeria)	19	Brian Idowu	1	0	0	1
9	MF	(Iran)	66	Saeid Ezatolahi	1	0	0	1
9	DF	(Bulgaria)	3	Petar Zanev	1	0	0	1
9	MF	(Belarus)	16	Syarhey Balanovich	0	0	1	1
				TOTALS	20	5	3	28

=== Disciplinary record ===
Number	Nation	Position	Name	Premier League		Russian Cup		Playoff		Total	
Number	Nation	Position	Name	Yellow card	Red card	Yellow card	Red card	Yellow card	Red card	Yellow card	Red card
1	(Russia)	GK	Artur Nigmatullin	5	0	0	0	0	0	5	0
2	(Serbia)	DF	Aleksandar Miljković	5	0	0	0	0	0	5	0
3	(Bulgaria)	DF	Petar Zanev	4	0	0	0	0	0	4	0
4	(Russia)	DF	Nikolai Zaytsev	6	1	0	0	0	0	6	1
5	(Poland)	MF	Janusz Gol	5	0	1	0	1	0	7	0
6	(Guinea)	DF	Sékou Condé	5	0	1	0	0	0	6	0
8	(Nigeria)	MF	Fegor Ogude	2	1	0	0	1	0	3	1
9	(Austria)	FW	Darko Bodul	4	0	1	0	0	0	5	0
11	(Russia)	FW	Aleksei Gasilin	1	0	0	0	0	0	1	0
13	(Russia)	MF	Roland Gigolayev	1	0	0	0	0	0	1	0
17	(Russia)	MF	Mikhail Gashchenkov	3	0	0	0	1	0	4	0
18	(Belarus)	DF	Mikhail Sivakow	3	0	0	0	0	0	3	0
19	(Nigeria)	DF	Brian Idowu	7	1	1	0	1	0	9	1
20	(Russia)	MF	Pavel Komolov	1	0	1	0	0	0	2	0
26	(Costa Rica)	FW	Felicio Brown Forbes	0	0	0	0	1	0	1	0
27	(Russia)	MF	Mikhail Kostyukov	5	0	1	0	1	0	7	0
41	(Russia)	DF	Dmitri Belorukov	6	1	0	0	0	0	6	1
66	(Iran)	MF	Saeid Ezatolahi	4	0	1	0	0	0	5	0
77	(Russia)	FW	Aleksandr Salugin	2	0	0	0	0	0	2	0
80	(Nigeria)	FW	Aaron Olanare	1	0	0	0	0	0	1	0
			TOTALS	70	4	7	0	6	0	83	4
