= Ivan Melnikov =

Ivan Melnikov may refer to:

- Ivan Melnikov (politician) (born 1950), Russian politician
- Ivan Melnikov (baritone) (1832–1906), opera singer
- Ivan Melnikov (footballer) (born 1997), Russian football player

== See also ==
- Melnikov
