= Melnikov =

Melnikov (Russian: Ме́льников, feminine: Melnikova) is an occupational surname of Russian origin.The root "мельник" (melnik) meaning miller.

It may refer to:

- Alexander Melnikov (pianist) (born 1973), Russian pianist
- Alexander Melnikov (politician) (1930–2011), Soviet and Russian politician
- Andrey Melnikov (1968–1988), Soviet soldier
- Angelina Melnikova (born 2000), Russian gymnast
- Anna Melnikova (born 1985), Russian female acrobatic gymnast
- Anna Melnikova (volleyball) (born 1995), Russian female volleyball player
- Antonina Melnikova (born 1958), Belarusian sprint canoeist who competed for the Soviet Union
- Avraam Melnikov (1784–1854), Russian architect
- Boris Melnikov (fencer) (1938–2022), Soviet fencer
- Boris Melnikov (diplomat) (1896–1938), Soviet intelligence officer and diplomat
- Darya Melnikova (born 1992), Russian actress of theater, film and television
- Ivan Melnikov (politician) (born 1950), Russian politician
- Ivan Melnikov (baritone) (1832–1906), opera singer
- Ivan Melnikov (footballer) (born 1997), Russian football player
- Konstantin Melnikov (1890–1974), Russian architect
- Leonid Melnikov (1906–1981), Soviet politician and diplomat
- Marina Melnikova (born 1989), Russian tennis player
- Mariya Dolina-Melnikova (1922–2010), Pe-2 pilot and deputy squadron commander
- Nikita Melnikov (wrestler) (born 1987), Russian wrestler
- Nikita Melnikov (footballer) (born 1997), Russian footballer
- Nikolay Melnikov (water polo) (born 1948), Soviet water polo player
- Nikolay Melnikov (curler) (born 1964), Russian wheelchair curler
- Pavel Ivanovich Melnikov (1818-1883), Russian writer
- Pavel Petrovich Melnikov, Russian engineer
- Pavel Melnikov (rower), Russian Olympic rower
- Sergey Melnikov (born 1968), Russian runner
- Semyon Melnikov (born 1985), Russian footballer
- Stepan Melnikov (born 2002), Russian footballer
- Svetlana Melnikova (born 1951), retired female discus thrower and shot putter
- Tamara Melnikova (born 1940), Russian museum worker, teacher, literary scholar
- Valentina Melnikova (born 1946), Russian human rights activist and politician
- Varvara Melnikova (born 1980), Russian business executive and urban planner
- Vasily Melnikov (1943–2017), Soviet alpine skier
- Viktor Melnikov (born 1944), Soviet rower
- Vitaly Melnikov (film director) (1928–2022), Russian film director
- Vitaly Melnikov (swimmer) (born 1990), Russian swimmer
- Volodymyr Melnykov (born 1951), Ukrainian poet and composer
- Vyacheslav Melnikov (alpine skier) (born 1931), Soviet Olympic skier
- Vyacheslav Melnikov (footballer, born 1954), Russian football player (senior career 1975–1986) and coach (1991–2008)
- Vyacheslav Melnikov (footballer, born 1975), Russian football player (senior career 1991–2007)
- Yakov Melnikov (1896–1960) was a Russian and Soviet speed skater
- Yelena Melnikova (born 1971), Russian former biathlete who competed in the 1992 Winter Olympics
- Yury Melnikov (born 1940), Russian diver

== See also ==
- Melnykov, Ukrainian variant of the surname
- Melnikov House
- Melnikov distance
- Melnikov Permafrost Institute, research institute in Yakutsk, Russia
