= Artur Nigmatullin =

Russian footballer

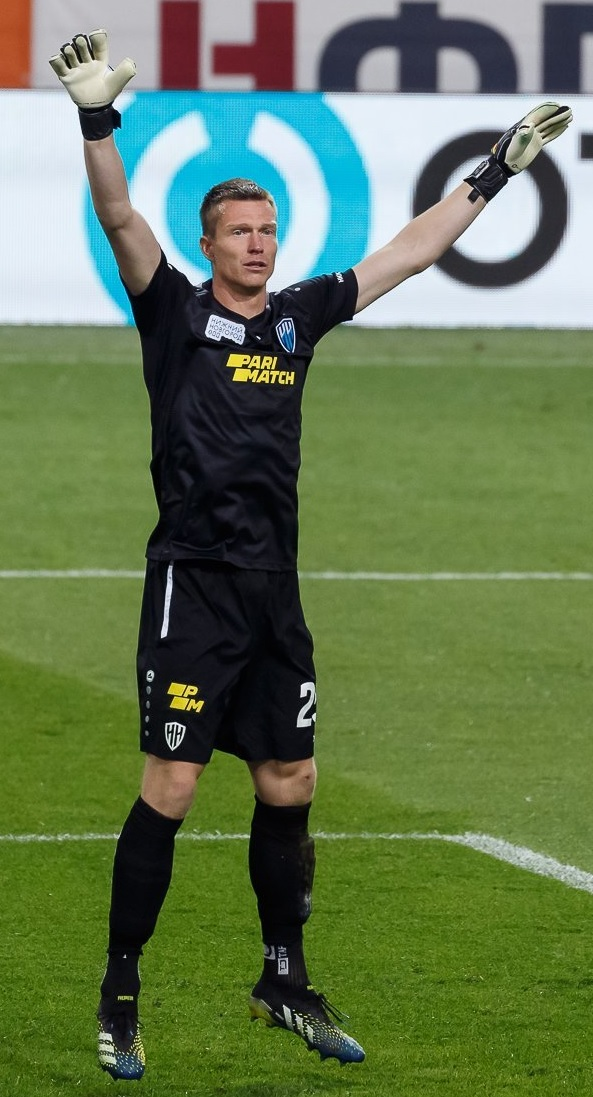
- Nigmatullin with FC Nizhny Novgorod in 2021

Personal information
- Full name: Artur Eduardovich Nigmatullin
- Date of birth: 17 May 1991 (age 35)
- Place of birth: Vladivostok, Russian SFSR
- Height: 1.94 m (6 ft 4 in)
- Position: Goalkeeper

Team information
- Current team: Rubin Kazan
- Number: 25

Youth career
- Luch-Energiya Vladivostok
- CSKA Moscow

Senior career*
Years	Team	Apps	(Gls)
2009–2013	CSKA Moscow	0	(0)
2011	→ Mordovia Saransk (loan)	5	(0)
2011	→ Ural Yekaterinburg (loan)	5	(0)
2012	→ Khimki (loan)	10	(0)
2012–2013	→ Volga Nizhny Novgorod (loan)	0	(0)
2013–2015	Volga Nizhny Novgorod	42	(0)
2016–2017	Tosno	48	(0)
2017–2018	Amkar Perm	29	(0)
2018–2021	Arsenal Tula	26	(0)
2021–2024	Pari Nizhny Novgorod	71	(0)
2024–	Rubin Kazan	2	(0)

International career
2009	Russia U-19	5	(0)
2011	Russia U-20	3	(0)
2012	Russia U-21	1	(0)
- * Club domestic league appearances and goals as of 27 July 2024

Artur Eduardovich Nigmatullin (Russian: Артур Эдуардович Нигматуллин; born 17 May 1991) is a Russian football goalkeeper who plays for Rubin Kazan.

== Club career ==
In 2010, Nigmatullin was suspended for 10 months after he failed a drug test. He made his professional debut for Mordovia Saransk on 4 April 2011 in a Russian First Division game against SKA-Energiya Khabarovsk.

On 16 June 2018, he signed with Arsenal Tula.

On 8 July 2021, Nigmatullin joined Nizhny Novgorod. On 31 August 2023, Nigmatullin extended his contract with Pari Nizhny Novgorod to June 2027.

On 15 June 2024, Nigmatullin signed a two-year contract with Rubin Kazan. On 1 July 2026, Nigmatullin extended his Rubin contract for the 2026–27 season.

== International career ==
Nigmatullin was called up to the Russia national football team for the first time in November 2023 for a friendly against Cuba.

== Career statistics ==
=== Club ===
As of match played 28 October 2026

Appearances and goals by club, season and competition
Club	Season	League			Cup		Continental		Other		Total	
Club	Season	Division	Apps	Goals	Apps	Goals	Apps	Goals	Apps	Goals	Apps	Goals
CSKA Moscow	2009	Russian Premier League	0	0	0	0	0	0	–		0	0
Mordovia Saransk	2011–12	Russian First League	5	0	–		–		–		5	0
Ural Yekaterinburg	2011–12	Russian First League	5	0	–		–		–		5	0
Khimki	2011–12	Russian First League	10	0	–		–		–		10	0
Volga Nizhny Novgorod	2012–13	Russian Premier League	0	0	0	0	–		–		0	0
Volga Nizhny Novgorod	2013–14	Russian Premier League	3	0	0	0	–		–		3	0
Volga Nizhny Novgorod	2014–15	Russian First League	18	0	1	0	–		2 (Note: Appearances in the FNL Cup)	0	21	0
Volga Nizhny Novgorod	2015–16	Russian First League	21	0	0	0	–		–		21	0
Volga Nizhny Novgorod	Total		42	0	1	0	0	0	2	0	45	0
Tosno	2015–16	Russian First League	12	0	–		–		–		12	0
Tosno	2016–17	Russian First League	36	0	3	0	–		–		39	0
Tosno	Total		48	0	3	0	0	0	2	0	51	0
Amkar Perm	2017–18	Russian Premier League	29	0	2	0	–		2 (Note: Appearances in the relegation play-offs)	0	33	0
Arsenal Tula	2018–19	Russian Premier League	16	0	3	0	–		–		19	0
Arsenal Tula	2019–20	Russian Premier League	1	0	1	0	0	0	–		2	0
Arsenal Tula	2020–21	Russian Premier League	9	0	1	0	–		–		10	0
Arsenal Tula	Total		26	0	5	0	0	0	0	0	31	0
Nizhny Novgorod	2021–22	Russian Premier League	23	0	1	0	–		–		24	0
Nizhny Novgorod	2022–23	Russian Premier League	19	0	5	0	–		2	0	26	0
Nizhny Novgorod	2023–24	Russian Premier League	29	0	0	0	–		2	0	31	0
Nizhny Novgorod	Total		71	0	6	0	0	0	4	0	81	0
Rubin Kazan	2024–25	Russian Premier League	2	0	5	0	–		–		7	0
Rubin Kazan	2025–26	Russian Premier League	0	0	7	0	–		–		7	0
Rubin Kazan	2026–27	Russian Premier League	0	0	4	0	–		–		4	0
Rubin Kazan	Total		2	0	16	0	0	0	0	0	18	0
Career total			238	0	33	0	0	0	8	0	279	0
