= Melnykov =

Melnykov (Ukrainian: Мельников, feminine: Melnykova) is a Ukrainian surname. Notable people with the surname include:

== Melnykov ==
- Leonid Melnykov (1906–1981), Ukrainian politician and diplomat
- Stanislav Melnykov (born 1987), Ukrainian hurdler
- Volodymyr Melnykov (born 1951), Ukrainian poet, writer, songwriter, inventor and composer

== Melnykova ==
- Iryna Melnykova (1918–2010), Ukrainian historian

== See also ==
- Melnikov, surname
