= Mikhail Kostyukov =

Russian footballer

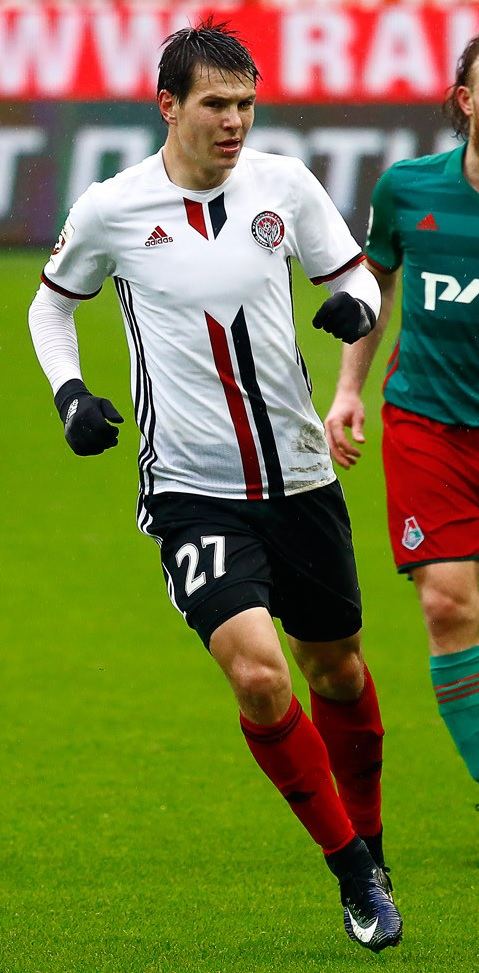
- Kostyukov with Amkar in 2017

Personal information
- Full name: Mikhail Aleksandrovich Kostyukov
- Date of birth: 9 August 1991 (age 35)
- Place of birth: Nizhny Novgorod, Russian SFSR
- Height: 1.82 m (6 ft 0 in)
- Position: Forward

Youth career
- 2008: Nizhny Novgorod
- 2009–2010: Volga Nizhny Novgorod

Senior career*
Years	Team	Apps	(Gls)
2011–2014	Khimik Dzerzhinsk	102	(7)
2015–2016	Volga Nizhny Novgorod	38	(4)
2016–2018	Amkar Perm	37	(5)
2018–2019	Yenisey Krasnoyarsk	13	(4)
2019–2020	Tambov	43	(8)
2021–2024	Rubin Kazan	35	(3)
2023–2024	→ Dynamo Makhachkala (loan)	17	(1)
2024	SKA-Khabarovsk	4	(0)
2024–2025	Volna Nizhny Novgorod Oblast	14	(0)
Total		303	(32)
- * Club domestic league appearances and goals

Mikhail Aleksandrovich Kostyukov (Russian: Михаил Александрович Костюков; born 9 August 1991) is a Russian former football player. He has been deployed in a variety of positions on the field, most often as a right midfielder, winger or centre-forward.

== Club career ==
He made his debut in the Russian Second Division for Khimik Dzerzhinsk on 24 April 2011 in a game against FC Gornyak Uchaly.

He made his Russian Premier League debut for Amkar Perm on 15 August 2016 in a game against Orenburg.

On 29 May 2019, he signed with Tambov for a term of one year with one year extension option.

On 1 February 2021, he signed a 4-year contract with Rubin Kazan. On 5 September 2023, Kostyukov was loaned by Dynamo Makhachkala.

== Career statistics ==
=== Club ===
As of 21 May 2022

Club	Season	League			Cup		Continental		Other		Total	
Club	Season	Division	Apps	Goals	Apps	Goals	Apps	Goals	Apps	Goals	Apps	Goals
Khimik Dzerzhinsk	2011–12	PFL	38	5	2	1	–		–		40	6
Khimik Dzerzhinsk	2012–13	PFL	22	1	2	0	–		–		24	1
Khimik Dzerzhinsk	2013–14	FNL	24	0	2	1	–		4 (Note: Appearances in the FNL Cup)	0	30	1
Khimik Dzerzhinsk	2014–15	FNL	18	1	2	0	–		–		20	1
Khimik Dzerzhinsk	Total		102	7	8	2	0	0	4	0	114	9
Volga Nizhny Novgorod	2014–15	FNL	12	1	–		–		–		12	1
Volga Nizhny Novgorod	2015–16	FNL	26	3	2	0	–		–		28	3
Volga Nizhny Novgorod	Total		38	4	2	0	0	0	0	0	40	4
Amkar Perm	2016–17	RPL	19	2	2	0	–		–		21	2
Amkar Perm	2017–18	RPL	18	3	3	0	–		2 (Note: Appearances in relegation play-offs)	1	23	4
Amkar Perm	Total		37	5	5	0	0	0	2	1	44	6
Yenisey Krasnoyarsk	2018–19	RPL	13	4	0	0	–		–		13	4
Tambov	2019–20	RPL	27	7	0	0	–		3	1	30	8
Tambov	2020–21	RPL	16	1	2	0	–		–		18	1
Tambov	Total		43	8	2	0	0	0	3	1	48	9
Rubin Kazan	2020–21	RPL	8	1	–		–		–		8	1
Rubin Kazan	2021–22	RPL	13	1	0	0	2 (Note: Appearances in the UEFA Europa Conference League)	0	–		15	1
Rubin Kazan	Total		21	2	0	0	2	0	0	0	23	2
Career total			254	30	17	2	2	0	9	2	282	34
