= Brian Idowu =

Nigerian footballer

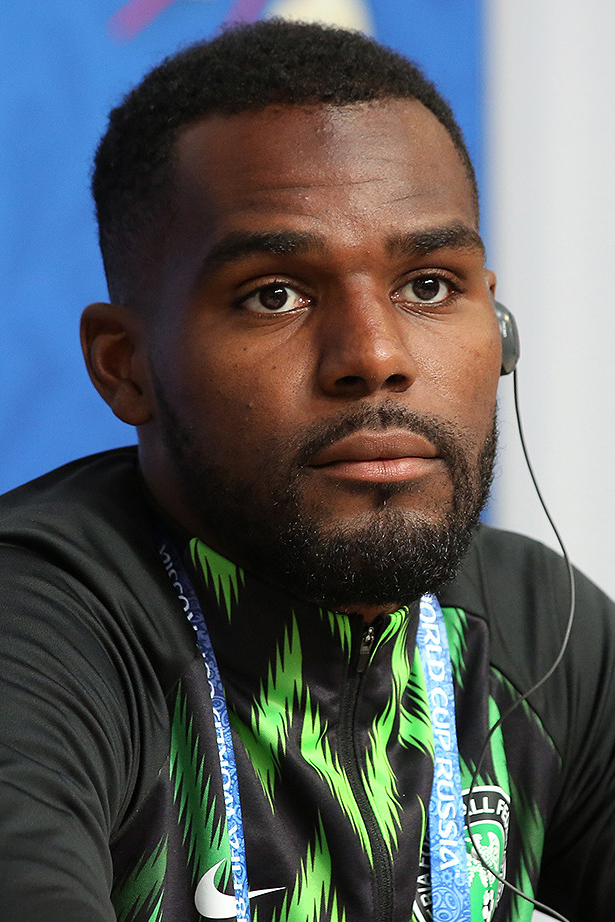
- Idowu with Nigeria at the 2018 FIFA World Cup

Personal information
- Full name: Brian Oladapo Idowu
- Date of birth: 18 May 1992 (age 34)
- Place of birth: Saint Petersburg, Russia
- Height: 1.79 m (5 ft 10 in)
- Position: Defender

Youth career
- 1999–: Smena-Zenit
- –2010: Zenit St. Petersburg
- 2010–2015: Amkar Perm

Senior career*
Years	Team	Apps	(Gls)
2012–2018	Amkar Perm	87	(1)
2013–2014	→ Dynamo St. Petersburg (loan)	25	(1)
2018–2021	Lokomotiv Moscow	25	(0)
2020–2021	→ Khimki (loan)	28	(3)
2021–2023	Khimki	41	(0)

International career^{‡}
2017–2018	Nigeria	10	(1)
- * Club domestic league appearances and goals as of 15 April 2023 ‡ National team caps and goals as of 20 November 2018

Brian Oladapo Idowu (Russian: Брайан Оладапо Идову; born 18 May 1992) is a former professional footballer who played as a left-back. Born in Russia, he played for the Nigeria national team.

== Club career ==
Born in Saint Petersburg to a Nigerian father and a Russian-Nigerian mother, Idowu moved to Owerri, Nigeria at early age, and later moved back to Russia.

He made his Russian Premier League debut for FC Amkar Perm on 6 May 2012 in a game against FC Terek Grozny.

After a loan spell with Dynamo St Petersburg during the 2013–14 season, Idowu signed a new 3-year deal with Amkar on 30 June 2014, extending his contract again in February 2017 until the summer of 2020.

=== Lokomotiv Moscow ===
On 10 July 2018, he signed a 3-year contract with FC Lokomotiv Moscow.

=== Khimki ===
On 7 August 2020, he joined Khimki on loan for the 2020–21 season.

On 7 June 2021, he moved to Khimki on a permanent basis, signing a 2-year contract with an additional 1-year extension option. He left Khimki in July 2023.

== International career ==
In November 2017, Idowu was called up to the Nigerian national team for their friendly against Argentina in Krasnodar on 14 November 2017. Idowu made his debut against Argentina on 14 November, coming on as a half-time substitute for Ola Aina, and scoring Nigeria's third goal in a 4-2 win.

In May 2018 he was named in Nigeria's preliminary 23-man squad for the 2018 FIFA World Cup in Russia.

== Personal life ==
Idowu's father is Nigerian and his mother is half-Russian, half-Nigerian. He was born and raised in St. Petersburg, except for a period when he was aged 3 to 6 when he lived in Owerri, Nigeria. Idowu speaks perfect Russian and acted as a makeshift translator of the Nigerian national team at news conference ahead of a fixture in Krasnodar in November 2017.

== Career statistics ==
=== Club ===
As of 28 May 2022

Club	Season	League			Cup		Continental		Other		Total	
Club	Season	Division	Apps	Goals	Apps	Goals	Apps	Goals	Apps	Goals	Apps	Goals
Amkar Perm	2011–12	RPL	1	0	0	0	–		–		1	0
Amkar Perm	2012–13	RPL	0	0	1	0	–		–		1	0
Amkar Perm	2013–14	RPL	0	0	–		–		–		0	0
Amkar Perm	2014–15	RPL	11	0	1	0	–		–		12	0
Amkar Perm	2015–16	RPL	22	0	3	1	–		–		25	1
Amkar Perm	2016–17	RPL	26	1	2	0	–		–		28	1
Amkar Perm	2017–18	RPL	27	0	3	1	–		2 (Note: Appearances in the relegation play-offs)	0	32	1
Amkar Perm	Total		87	1	10	2	0	0	2	0	99	3
Dynamo St. Petersburg (loan)	2013–14	FNL	25	1	1	0	–		–		26	1
Lokomotiv Moscow	2018–19	RPL	13	0	3	0	3 (Note: Appearances in the UEFA Champions League)	0	1 (Note: Appearance in the Russian Super Cup)	0	20	0
Lokomotiv Moscow	2019–20	RPL	12	0	1	0	4	0	1	0	18	0
Lokomotiv Moscow	Total		25	0	4	0	7	0	2	0	38	0
Khimki	2020–21	RPL	28	3	2	0	–		–		30	3
Khimki	2021–22	RPL	25	0	1	0	–		2	0	28	0
Khimki	2022–23	RPL	11	0	5	0	–		–		16	0
Khimki	Total		64	3	8	0	0	0	2	0	74	3
Career total			201	5	23	2	7	0	6	0	237	7

=== International ===
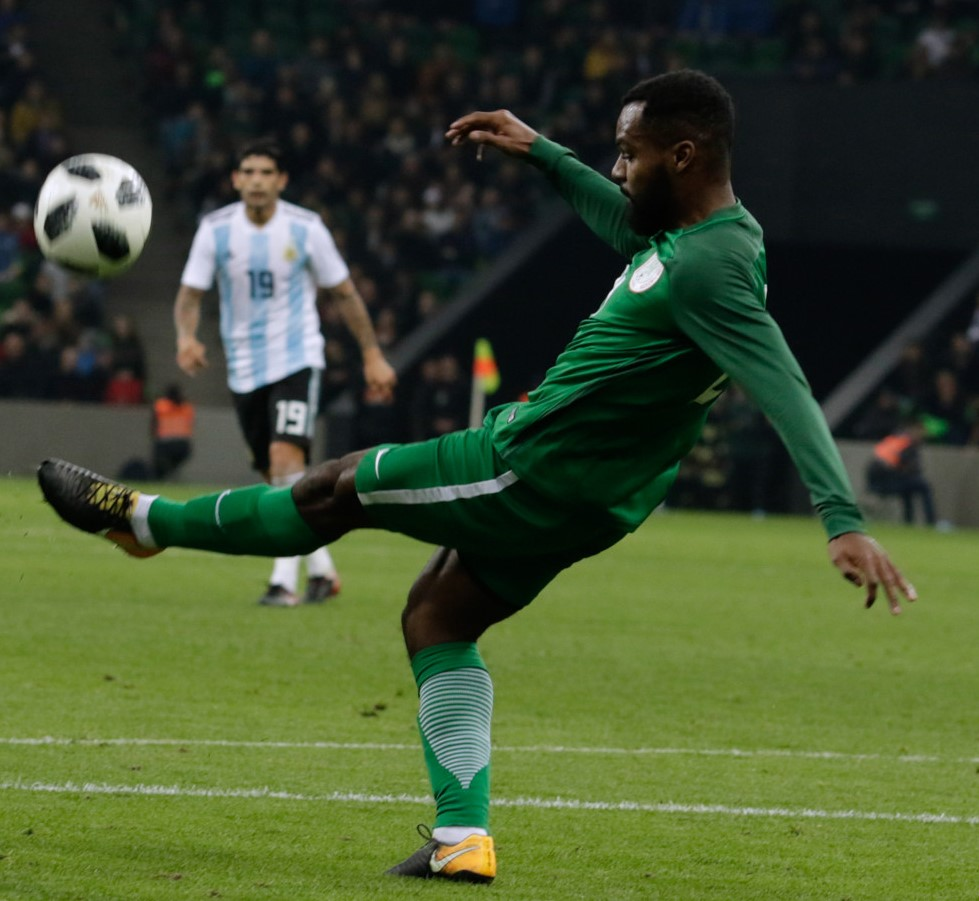
Idowu in a friendly match with Nigeria against Argentina, in 2017

As of 20 November 2019

Nigeria
Year	Apps	Goals
2017	1	1
2018	9	0
Total	10	1

=== International goals ===
#	Date	Venue	Opponent	Score	Result	Competition	Ref
1.	14 November 2017	Krasnodar Stadium, Krasnodar, Russia	Argentina	3–2	4–2	Friendly	

== Honours ==
=== Club ===
Lokomotiv Moscow

- Russian Cup: 2018–19
- Russian Super Cup: 2019
