= 2016–17 FC Tosno season =

FC Tosno
2016–17 season
- Owner: FORTGROUP
- Chairman: Viatcheslav Matyushenko
- Manager: Dmytro Parfenov
- Stadium: Electron Stadium, Veliky Novgorod (3,223)
- Russian Premier League: FNL, 2nd, promoted
| Home colours | Away colours |

FC Tosno during the 2016–17 campaign will be competing in the following competitions: National League, Russian Cup. This is the season where Tosno first received an RFU license, on 19 May 2017.

== Competitions ==
=== Results summary ===
| Overall | | | | | | | | Home | | | | | | Away | | | | | |
| Pld | W | D | L | GF | GA | GD | Pts | W | D | L | GF | GA | GD | W | D | L | GF | GA | GD |
|---|---|---|---|---|---|---|---|---|---|---|---|---|---|---|---|---|---|---|---|
| 38 | 21 | 12 | 5 | 63 | 30 | +33 | 75 | 10 | 6 | 3 | 39 | 18 | +21 | 11 | 6 | 2 | 24 | 12 | +12 |

Last updated: 20 May 2017.

=== Results by matchday ===
| Matchday | 1 | 2 | 3 | 4 | 5 | 6 | 7 | 8 | 9 | 10 | 11 | 12 | 13 | 14 | 15 | 16 | 17 | 18 | 19 | 20 | 21 | 22 | 23 | 24 | 25 | 26 | 27 | 28 | 29 | 30 | 31 | 32 | 33 | 34 | 35 | 36 | 37 | 38 |
|---|---|---|---|---|---|---|---|---|---|---|---|---|---|---|---|---|---|---|---|---|---|---|---|---|---|---|---|---|---|---|---|---|---|---|---|---|---|---|
| Ground | H | A | H | A | H | A | H | A | H | A | H | A | H | A | H | A | H | H | A | H | A | H | A | H | A | H | A | H | A | H | A | H | A | H | A | A | H | A |
| Result | D | W | W | D | W | W | D | W | L | W | W | D | W | D | L | W | W | W | L | W | W | D | D | W | D | D | W | L | W | W | W | D | D | D | W | L | W | W |
| Position | 2 | 2 | 2 | 2 | 2 | 2 | 2 | 2 | 2 | 2 | 2 | 2 | 2 | 2 | 2 | 2 | 2 | 2 | 2 | 2 | 2 | 2 | 2 | 2 | 2 | 2 | 2 | 2 | 2 | 2 | 2 | 2 | 2 | 2 | 2 | 2 | 2 | 2 |

Updated to match(es) played on 20 May 2017. Source:
A = Away; H = Home; W = Win; D = Draw; L = Loss

== Matches ==
| 11 July 2016 Match 1 | FC Tosno | 1 - 1 | Khimki | Veliky Novgorod |
| 20:00 | Kašćelan (yellow card) 79'; Dugalić (yellow card) 85'; Tetrashvili (yellow card) 87'; Mukhametshin 90' | Summary | Chernyshov (yellow card) 34'; Zaika (yellow card) 50'; Tyunin (yellow card) 66'; Gashchenkov 67' | Stadium: Stadion im. Aleksandra Nevskogo; Attendance: 2,300; Referee: (Russia) Sergey Ivanov |
