= Vasili Aleynikov =

Russian football player

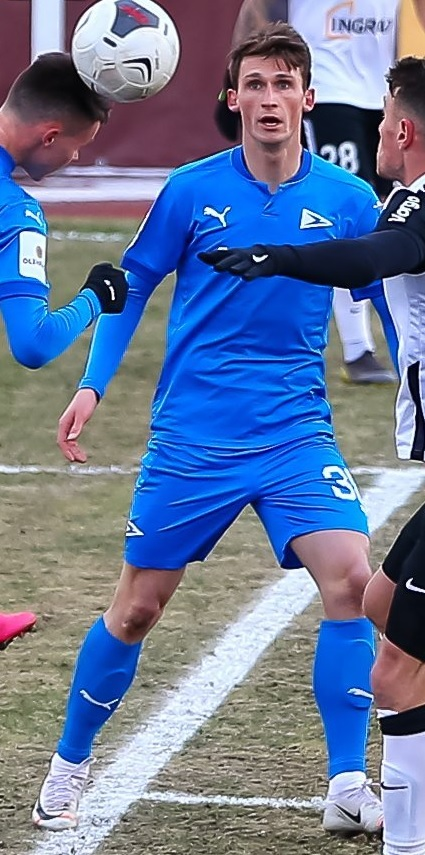
- Aleynikov with Chayka in 2021

Personal information
- Full name: Vasili Nikolayevich Aleynikov
- Date of birth: 15 May 1995 (age 31)
- Place of birth: Perm, Russia
- Height: 1.84 m (6 ft 0 in)
- Position: Midfielder

Team information
- Current team: FC Neftekhimik Nizhnekamsk
- Number: 38

Youth career
- –2012: Football SDYuSShOR Perm
- 2012–2015: FC Amkar Perm

Senior career*
Years	Team	Apps	(Gls)
2014–2018	FC Amkar Perm	0	(0)
2015–2017	→ FC Pskov-747 (loan)	49	(5)
2018	→ FC Tom Tomsk (loan)	8	(0)
2018–2020	FC Shinnik Yaroslavl	49	(4)
2020–2021	FC Chayka Peschanokopskoye	40	(4)
2021–2022	FC Kuban Krasnodar	32	(4)
2022–2023	FC SKA-Khabarovsk	20	(6)
2023	FC SKA-Khabarovsk-2	2	(0)
2023–2025	FC Shinnik Yaroslavl	61	(9)
2025–2026	FC SKA-Khabarovsk	22	(1)
2026–	FC Neftekhimik Nizhnekamsk	0	(0)
- * Club domestic league appearances and goals as of 16 May 2026

Vasili Nikolayevich Aleynikov (Russian: Василий Николаевич Алейников; born 15 May 1995) is a Russian football player who plays for FC Neftekhimik Nizhnekamsk.

== Club career ==
He made his debut in the Russian Professional Football League for FC Pskov-747 on 20 July 2015 in a game against FC Solyaris Moscow.

He made his Russian Football National League debut for FC Tom Tomsk on 4 March 2018 in a game against FC Shinnik Yaroslavl.
