= Sékou Condé (footballer, born 1993) =

Guinean footballer

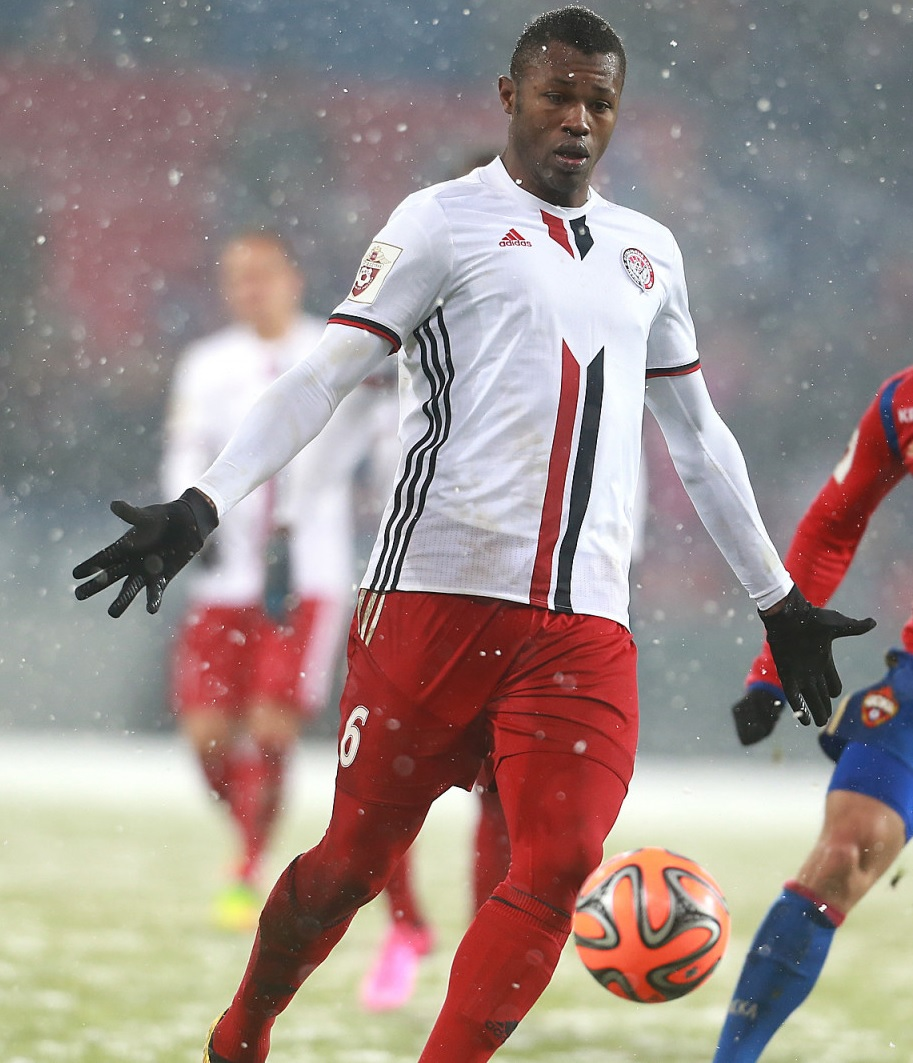
- Condé with Amkar Perm in 2016

Personal information
- Date of birth: 9 June 1993 (age 33)
- Place of birth: Conakry, Guinea
- Height: 1.92 m (6 ft 4 in)
- Position: Defender

Team information
- Current team: Châtellerault

Senior career*
Years	Team	Apps	(Gls)
2012–2014	Dnipro Dnipropetrovsk	0	(0)
2014	Hakoah Amidar Ramat Gan	2	(0)
2014–2015	Hapoel Petah Tikva	3	(0)
2015–2016	Olimpik Donetsk	13	(0)
2016–2018	Amkar Perm	36	(0)
2018–2020	Châteauroux	53	(0)
2022–2023	Beauvais	10	(0)
2023–	Châtellerault	24	(1)

International career^{‡}
2015–	Guinea	16	(1)
- * Club domestic league appearances and goals as of 7 December 2024 ‡ National team caps and goals as of 01:59, 11 February 2021 (UTC)

Sékou Condé (born 9 June 1993) is a Guinean professional footballer who plays as a defender for French Championnat National 3 club Châtellerault.

== Club career ==
After playing in the Ukrainian and Israeli football clubs in August 2015, Condé signed a contract with Olimpik Donetsk and made his debut in the Ukrainian Premier League in the match against Oleksandriya on 15 August 2015.

== International career ==
In September 2015, Condé was called up for the Guinea national team in the games against Algeria on 9 October and Morocco on 12 October.

== Career statistics ==
=== Club ===
As of 20 May 2018

Appearances and goals by club, season and competition
Club	Season	League			Cup		Continental		Other		Total	
Club	Season	Division	Apps	Goals	Apps	Goals	Apps	Goals	Apps	Goals	Apps	Goals
Dnipro	2012–13	Ukrainian Premier League	0	0	0	0	0	0	–		0	0
Dnipro	2013–14	Ukrainian Premier League	0	0	0	0	0	0	–		0	0
Dnipro	Total		0	0	0	0	0	0	0	0	0	0
Hakoah Amidar Ramat Gan	2014–15	Liga Leumit	2	0	0	0	–		–		2	0
Hapoel Petah Tikva	2014–15	Israeli Premier League	3	0	0	0	–		–		3	0
Olimpik Donetsk	2015–16	Ukrainian Premier League	13	0	3	0	–		–		16	0
Amkar Perm	2016–17	Russian Premier League	16	0	2	0	–		–		18	0
Amkar Perm	2017–18	Russian Premier League	20	0	2	0	–		1 (Note: One appearance in relegation play-offs)	0	23	0
Amkar Perm	Total		36	0	4	0	0	0	1	0	41	0
Career total			54	0	7	0	0	0	1	0	62	0

=== International ===
Scores and results list Guinea's goal tally first, score column indicates score after each Condé goal.

List of international goals scored by Sékou Condé
No.	Date	Venue	Opponent	Score	Result	Competition
1	14 November 2019	Stade du 26 Mars, Bamako, Mali	Mali	2–2	2–2	2021 Africa Cup of Nations qualification
