= Janusz Gol =

Polish footballer (born 1985)

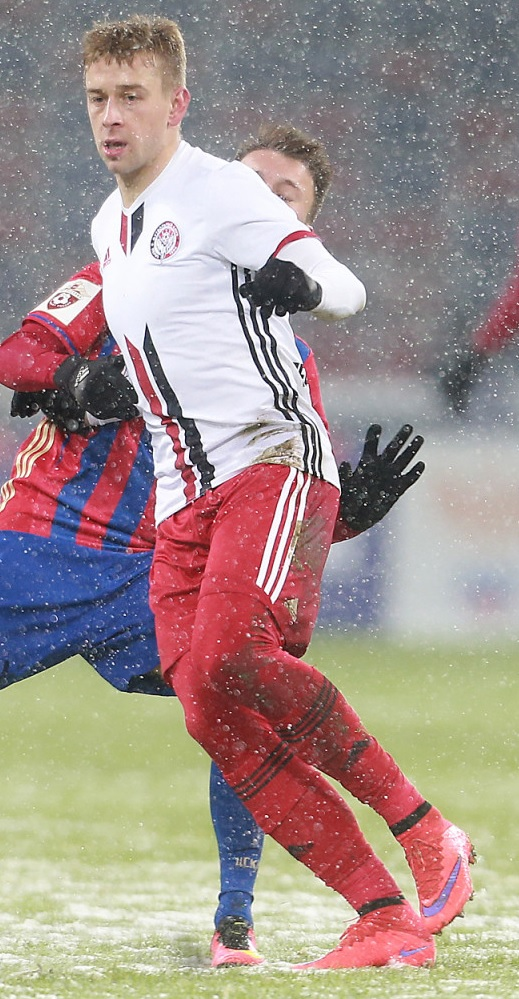
- Gol with FC Amkar Perm in 2016

Personal information
- Full name: Janusz Krzysztof Gol
- Date of birth: 11 November 1985 (age 40)
- Place of birth: Świdnica, Poland
- Height: 1.82 m (6 ft 0 in)
- Position: Midfielder

Youth career
- Polonia Świdnica

Senior career*
Years	Team	Apps	(Gls)
2004–2005	Sparta Świdnica		
2006–2008	Polonia/Sparta Świdnica		
2008–2011	GKS Bełchatów	66	(3)
2011–2013	Legia Warsaw	57	(4)
2013–2018	Amkar Perm	129	(10)
2018–2020	Cracovia	56	(1)
2020–2021	Dinamo București	24	(0)
2021–2022	Górnik Łęczna	29	(4)
2022–2025	Arka Gdynia	54	(4)

International career
2010–2012	Poland	8	(0)
- * Club domestic league appearances and goals

Janusz Gol (born 11 November 1985) is a Polish former professional footballer who played as a central midfielder.

== Club career ==
Having begun his playing career with local side Polonia Świdnica, Gol moved to GKS Bełchatów during the summer transfer window of 2008. He extended his contract with GKS to the end of 2010/2011 season a year later in June 2009.

At the end of his contract he joined Legia Warsaw on a three-and-a-half-year contract in February 2011.

In July 2013, he joined Russian side FC Amkar Perm on a two-year contract.

Following not re-signing for Amkar, Gol returned to his homeland to play for KS Cracovia.

In August 2020, Gol signed a two-year contract with Romanian side Dinamo București.

== International career ==
Gol earned eight caps for Poland national team from 2010 to 2012.

== Career statistics ==
=== Club ===
As of match played 21 April 2024

Appearances and goals by club, season and competition
Club	Season	League			National cup (Note: Includes Polish Cup, Russian Cup, Cupa României)		Continental		Other		Total	
Club	Season	Division	Apps	Goals	Apps	Goals	Apps	Goals	Apps	Goals	Apps	Goals
GKS Bełchatów	2008–09	Ekstraklasa	26	1	0	0	—		—		26	1
GKS Bełchatów	2009–10	Ekstraklasa	26	1	1	0	—		—		27	1
GKS Bełchatów	2010–11	Ekstraklasa	14	1	1	0	—		—		15	1
GKS Bełchatów	Total		66	3	2	0	0	0	0	0	68	3
Legia Warsaw	2010–11	Ekstraklasa	9	0	2	0	—		—		11	0
Legia Warsaw	2011–12	Ekstraklasa	29	4	5	1	11 (Note: Appearances in UEFA Europa League)	2	—		45	7
Legia Warsaw	2012–13	Ekstraklasa	19	0	6	0	5	1	1 (Note: Appearance in Polish Super Cup)	0	31	1
Legia Warsaw	2013–14	Ekstraklasa	0	0	0	0	0	0	—		0	0
Legia Warsaw	Total		57	4	13	1	16	3	1	0	87	8
Amkar Perm	2013–14	RPL	27	0	1	0	—		—		28	0
Amkar Perm	2014–15	RPL	23	2	1	0	—		—		24	2
Amkar Perm	2015–16	RPL	27	3	3	0	—		—		30	3
Amkar Perm	2016–17	RPL	26	2	1	0	—		—		27	2
Amkar Perm	2017–18	RPL	26	3	2	0	—		2 (Note: Appearances in RPL relegation play-offs)	1	30	4
Amkar Perm	Total		129	10	8	0	0	0	2	1	139	11
Cracovia	2018–19	Ekstraklasa	30	0	1	0	—		—		31	0
Cracovia	2019–20	Ekstraklasa	26	1	3	0	2	0	0	0	31	1
Cracovia	Total		56	1	4	0	2	0	0	0	62	1
Dinamo București	2020–21	Liga I	24	0	3	0	—		—		27	0
Górnik Łęczna	2021–22	Ekstraklasa	29	4	3	0	—		—		32	4
Arka Gdynia	2022–23	I liga	32	2	0	0	—		—		32	2
Arka Gdynia	2023–24	I liga	22	2	1	0	—		0	0	23	2
Arka Gdynia	2024–25	I liga	0	0	0	0	—		—		0	0
Arka Gdynia	Total		54	4	1	0	—		0	0	55	4
Career total			415	26	34	1	18	3	3	1	470	31

=== International ===
Appearances and goals by national team and year
National team	Year	Apps	Goals
Poland
Poland	2010	2	0
Poland	2011	5	0
Poland	2012	1	0
Total		8	0

== Honours ==
Polonia/Sparta Świdnica

- IV liga Lower Silesia: 2007–08

Legia Warsaw

- Ekstraklasa: 2012–13
- Polish Cup: 2010–11, 2011–12, 2012–13

Cracovia

- Polish Cup: 2019–20

Individual

- Ekstraklasa Player of the Year: 2019
