= Volodymyr Melnykov =

Ukrainian writer, poet, and composer (born 1951)

Volodymyr Melnykov (Imir Elnik)
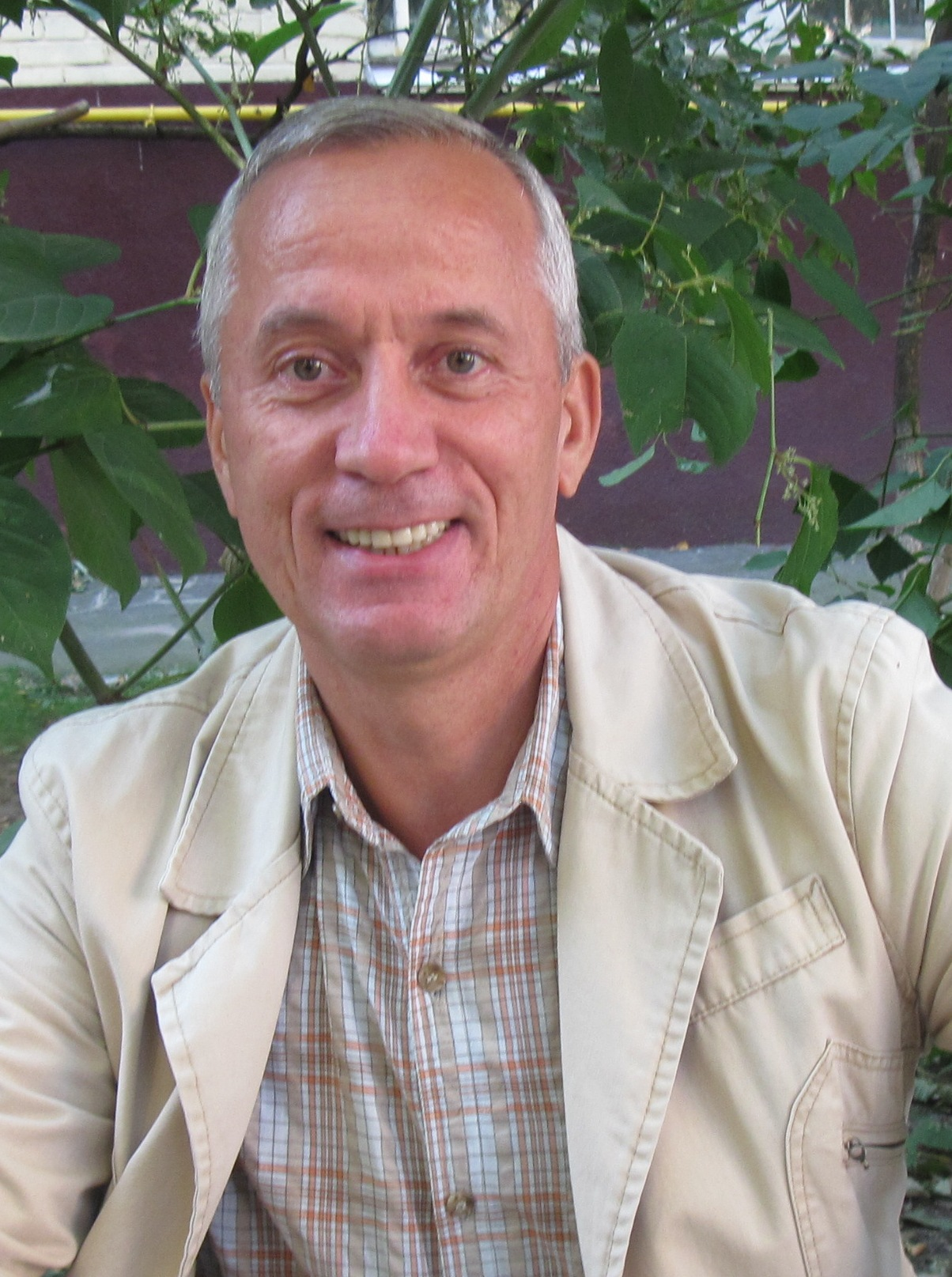
- Born: Melnykov Volodymyr Mykolaiovych; September 14, 1951 (age 74); Chernivtsi, Ukrainian SSR, Soviet Union
- Occupations: Poet, writer, composer, inventor
- Title: Merited Figure of Arts of Ukraine (2004)
- Awards: Medal For military service to Ukraine (2000); Merited Figure of Arts of Ukraine (2004); Honorary Diploma of the Cabinet of Ministers of Ukraine; Medal "60 Years of the Armed Forces of the USSR"; Medal "70 Years of the Armed Forces of the USSR"; Medal "For Impeccable Service 1st class"; Medal "For Impeccable Service 2nd class"; Medal "For Impeccable Service 3rd class"; Bronze Medal on the Watch of Peace (1979)
- Website: imirelnik.io.ua; Volodymyr Melnykov - instagram.com

Volodymyr Melnykov (Ukrainian: Володимир Миколайович Мельников; born September 14, 1951) is a Ukrainian poet, writer, songwriter, author of lyrics and music for songs, inventor, mathematician, composer and public figure, Merited Figure of Arts of Ukraine.

== Biography ==
Volodymyr Melnykov was born on September 14, 1951 in the city of Chernivtsi.

In 1974 – graduated from Minsk Higher Air Defense Anti-aircraft Missile Academy (Faculty of Radio Engineering).

In 1982 – graduated with honors (gold medal) from Kiev Military Academy of Air Defense of the Land Forces (Faculty of Engineering Management).

In 1987 – graduated from Kiev Military Academy of Air Defense of the Land Forces (he graduated from the postgraduate course and defended the dissertation of the candidate of technical sciences).

In 1969–1991 – served in the Armed Forces of the USSR (Moscow Air Defense District; Northern Group of Forces, Legnica, Poland; Turkestan Military District, Mary). In 1991 he was awarded the military rank "Colonel" and the scientific title "Associate Professor". Before the collapse of the USSR, he was a senior lecturer of the Kiev Military Air Defense Academy of the Land Forces.

In 1992–1995 – served in the Verification Center of the General Staff of the Armed Forces of Ukraine.

In 1995–2001, served in the General Military Inspectorate under the President of Ukraine, where before the liquidation of the Inspectorate he was the head of the inspection department for international military cooperation and compliance with international treaties on disarmament and arms control.

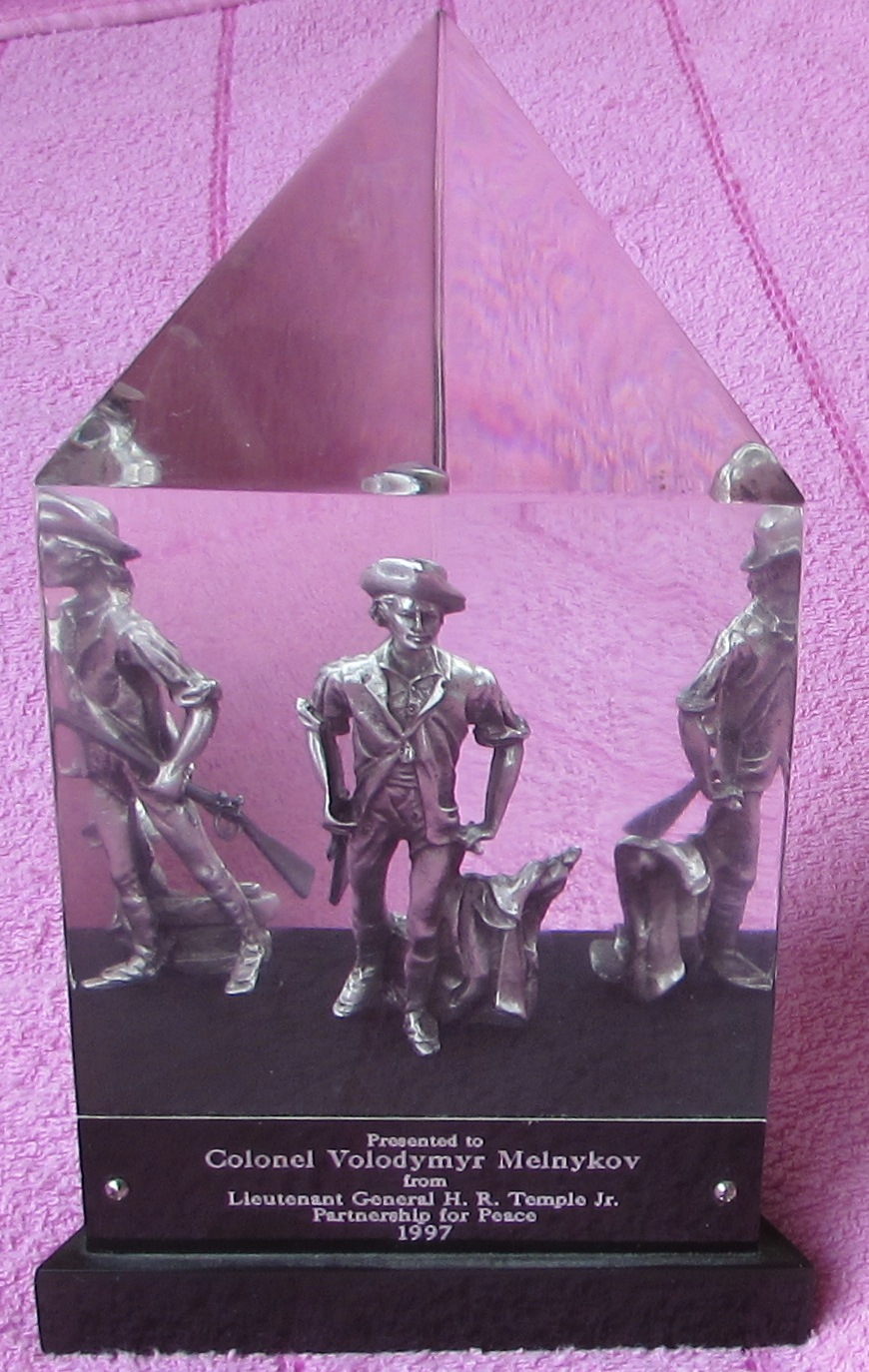

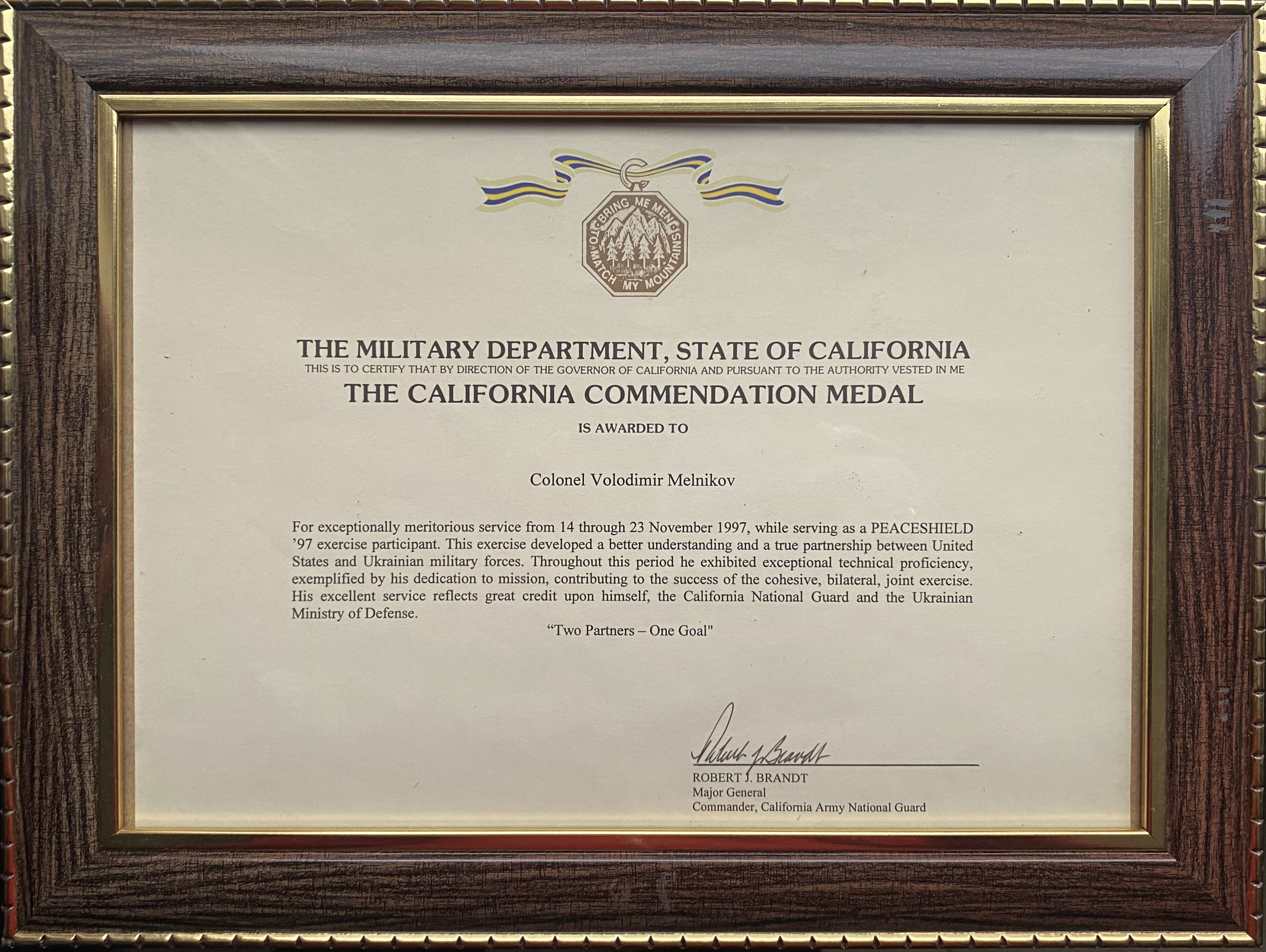

In late 2001, he retired from military service. Immediately continued his service in the Presidential Administration of Ukraine, where he served as deputy head of the department in the Main Directorate of Judicial Reform, military formations and law enforcement bodies.

In 2003 he was transferred to the State Administration of Affairs of the President of Ukraine, where he served until 2005 as the head of the Department for Economic Development.

In 2017 he worked in the office of the Writer's Union of Ukraine.

== His artistic awards ==
- The winner of the Art Prize of the State Border Guard Service of Ukraine "Emerald Lyra" for the first place in the nomination "Music" (2004)
- Laureate of the festival of the National Radio of Ukraine for the words to the song "I'm in love with Ukraine" (2013)
- Winner of the open nationwide song contest "My Dear Mother" (2014)
- Diploma for creating a cycle of patriotic songs at the All-Ukrainian Song Contest "Premiere of the Song" (2015)
- Laureate of the International Prize named after Volodymyr Vynnychenko (2019)

== His books and inventions ==
- Textbook «Design of mathematical algorithms for the functioning of radio-electronic equipment» (1992)
- Druziam. Moim Tovarisham. To my friends (2003)
- Ukraintsi Ne Papuasy (Ukrainians are not Papuans) (2007) (ISBN 978-966-646-089-2)
- Bezmezna Dolia (Boundless Share) (2014) (ISBN 978-966-288-046-5)
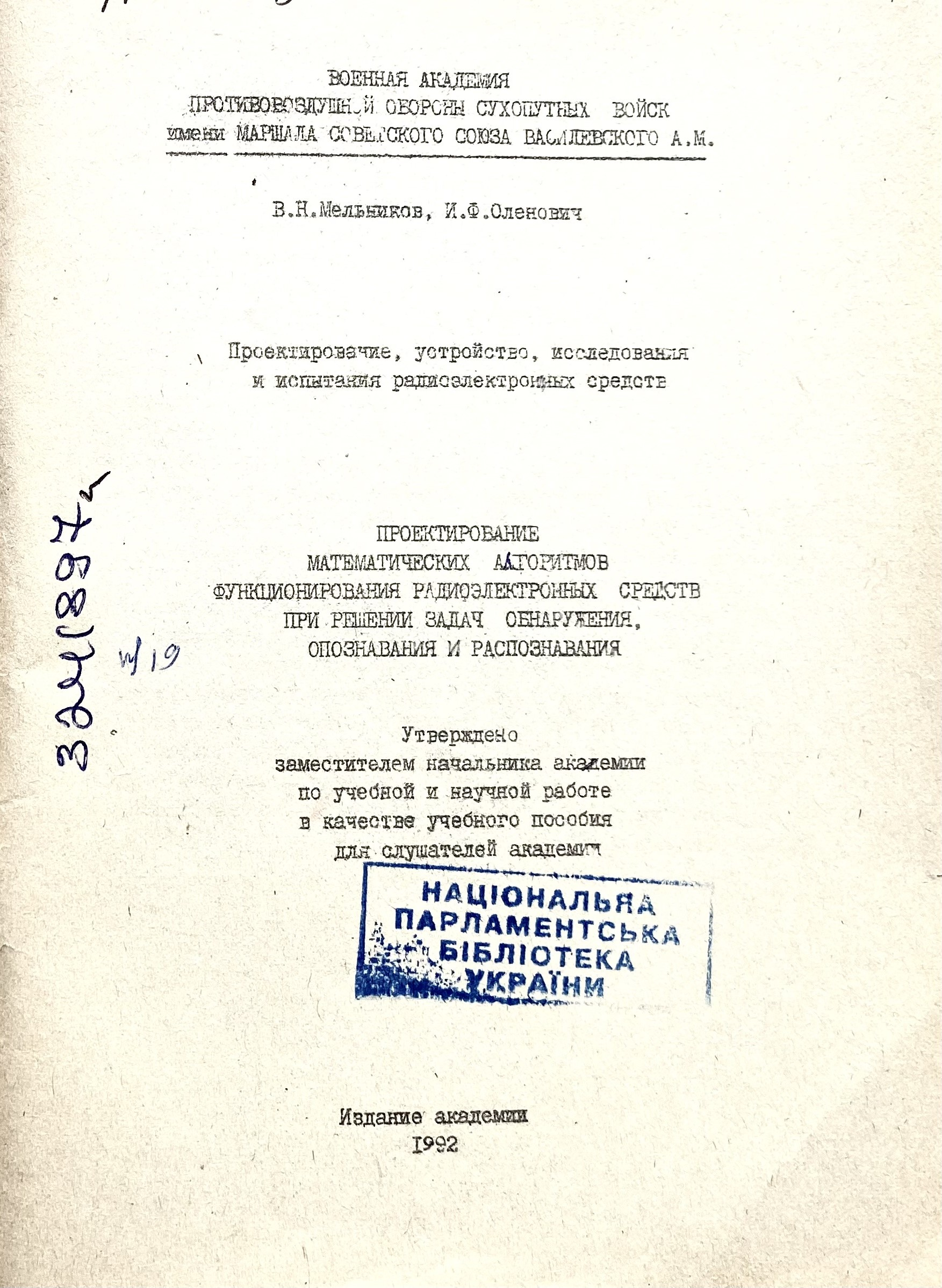

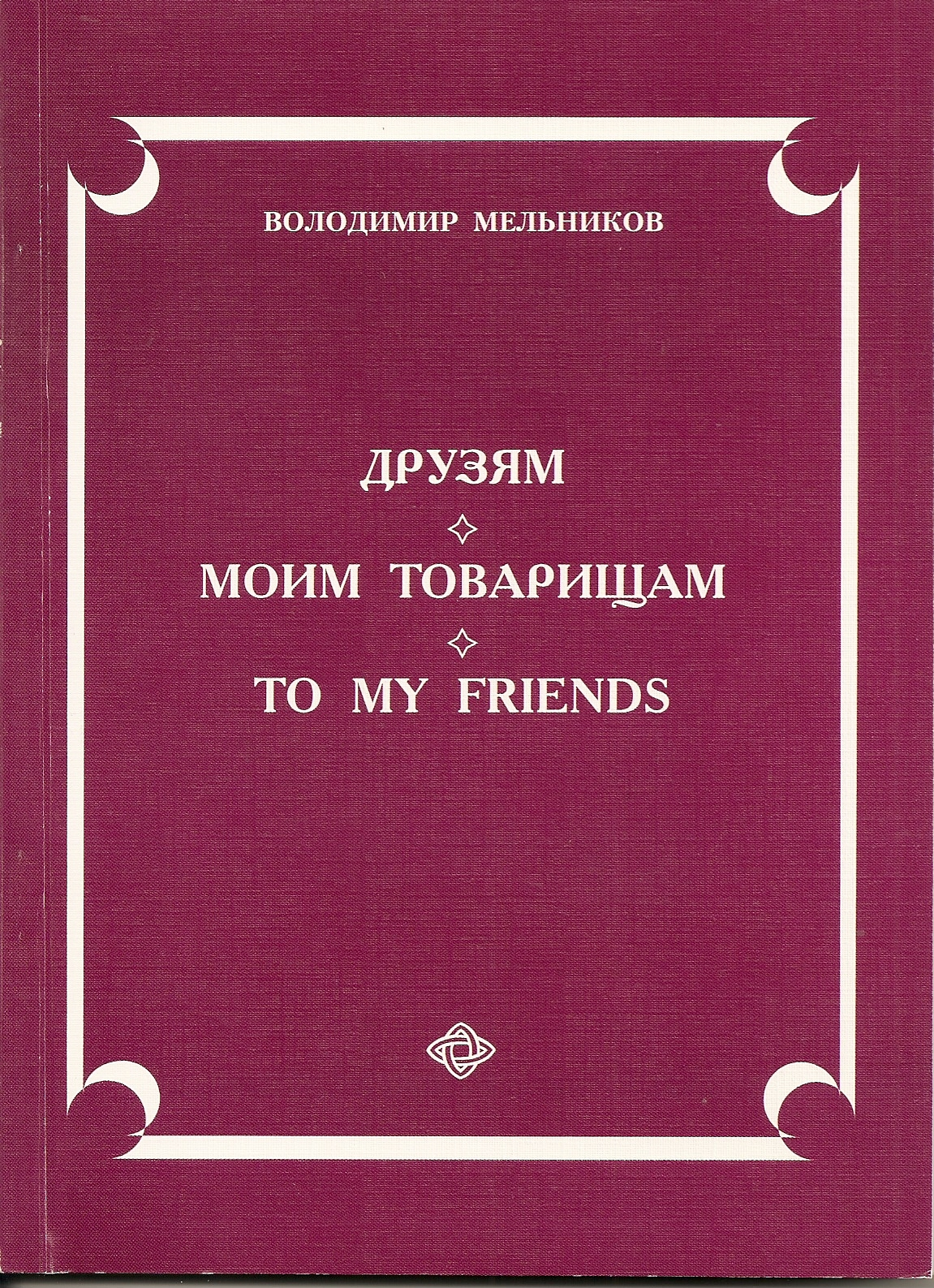

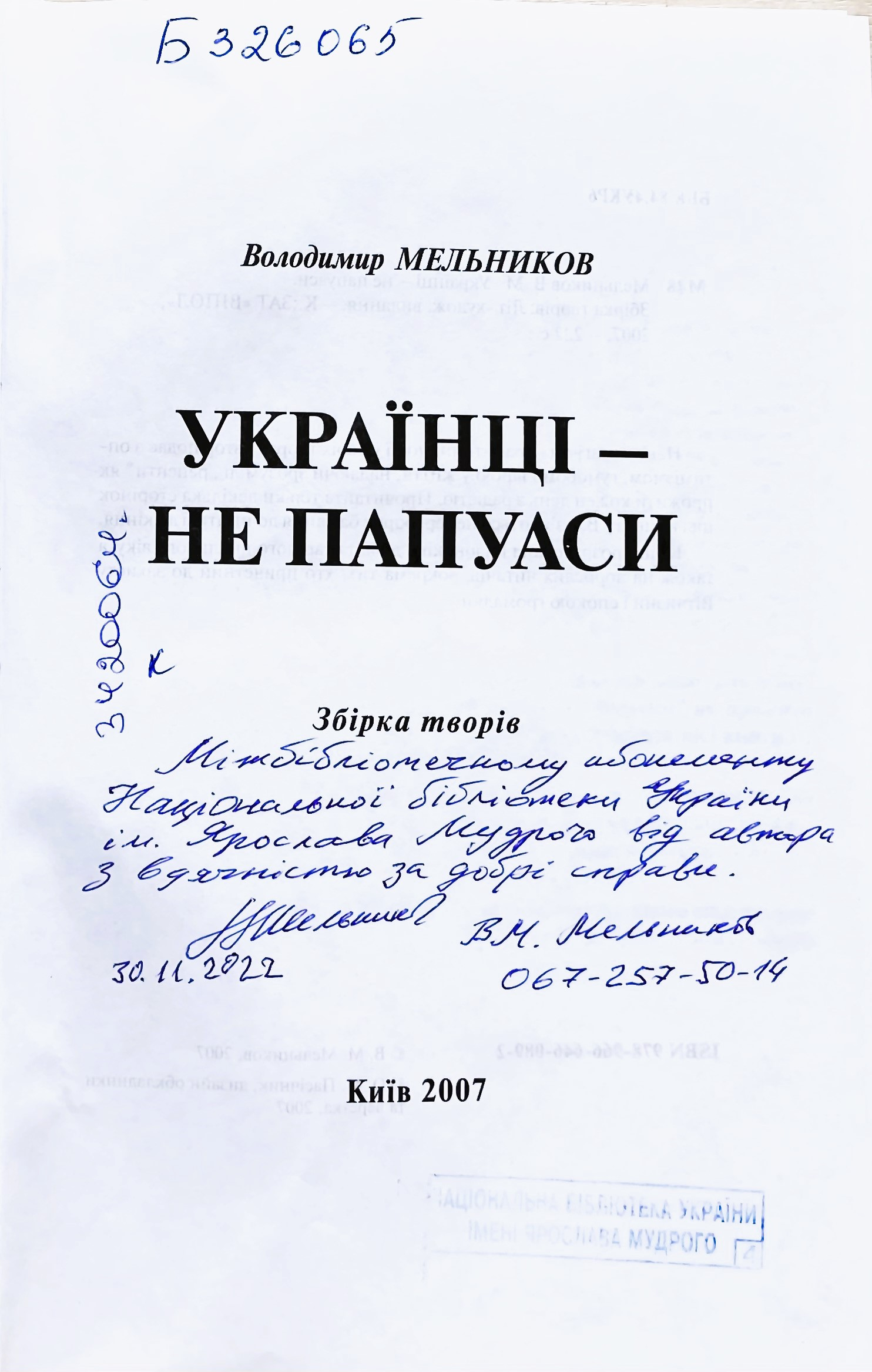

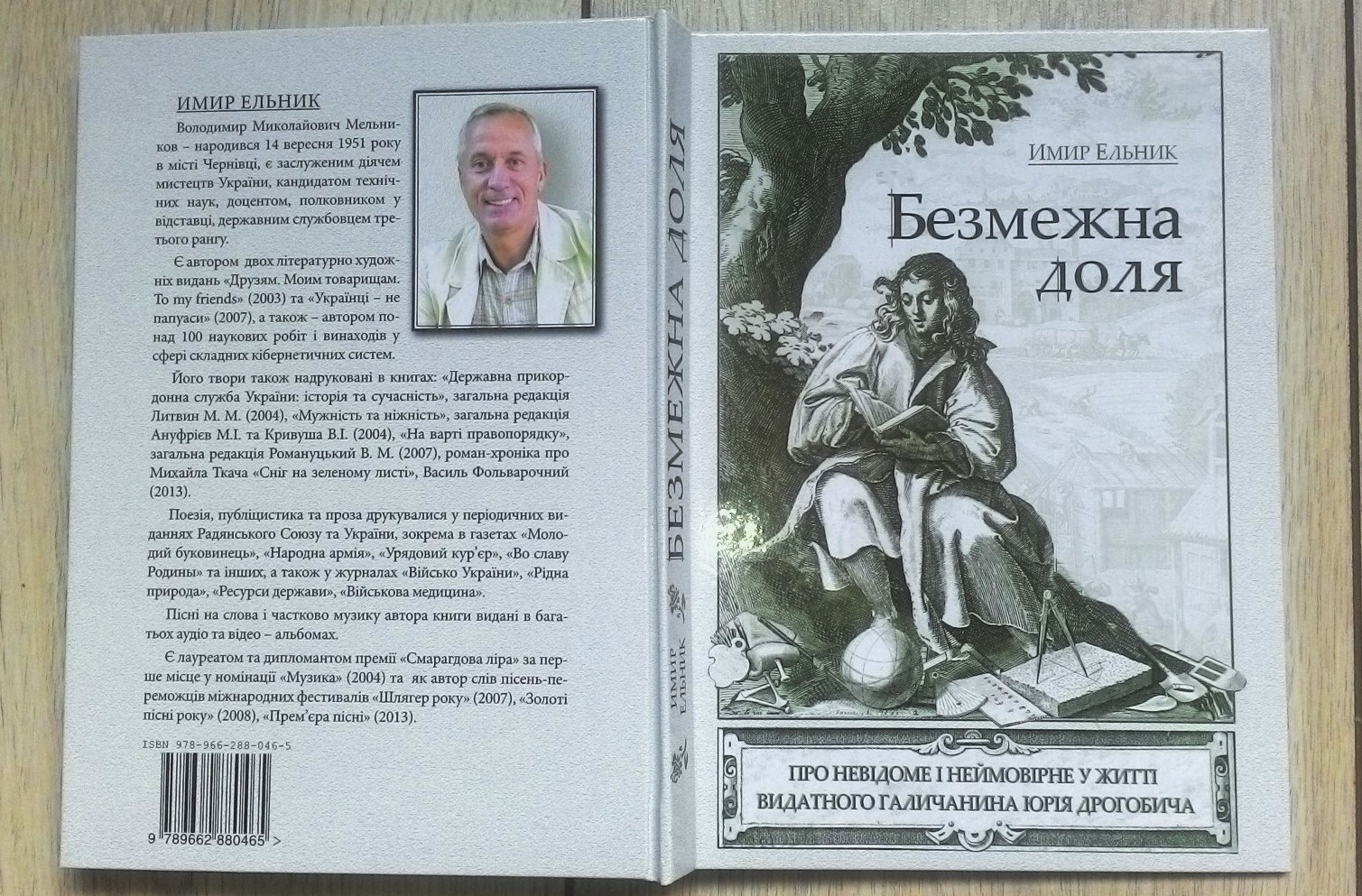

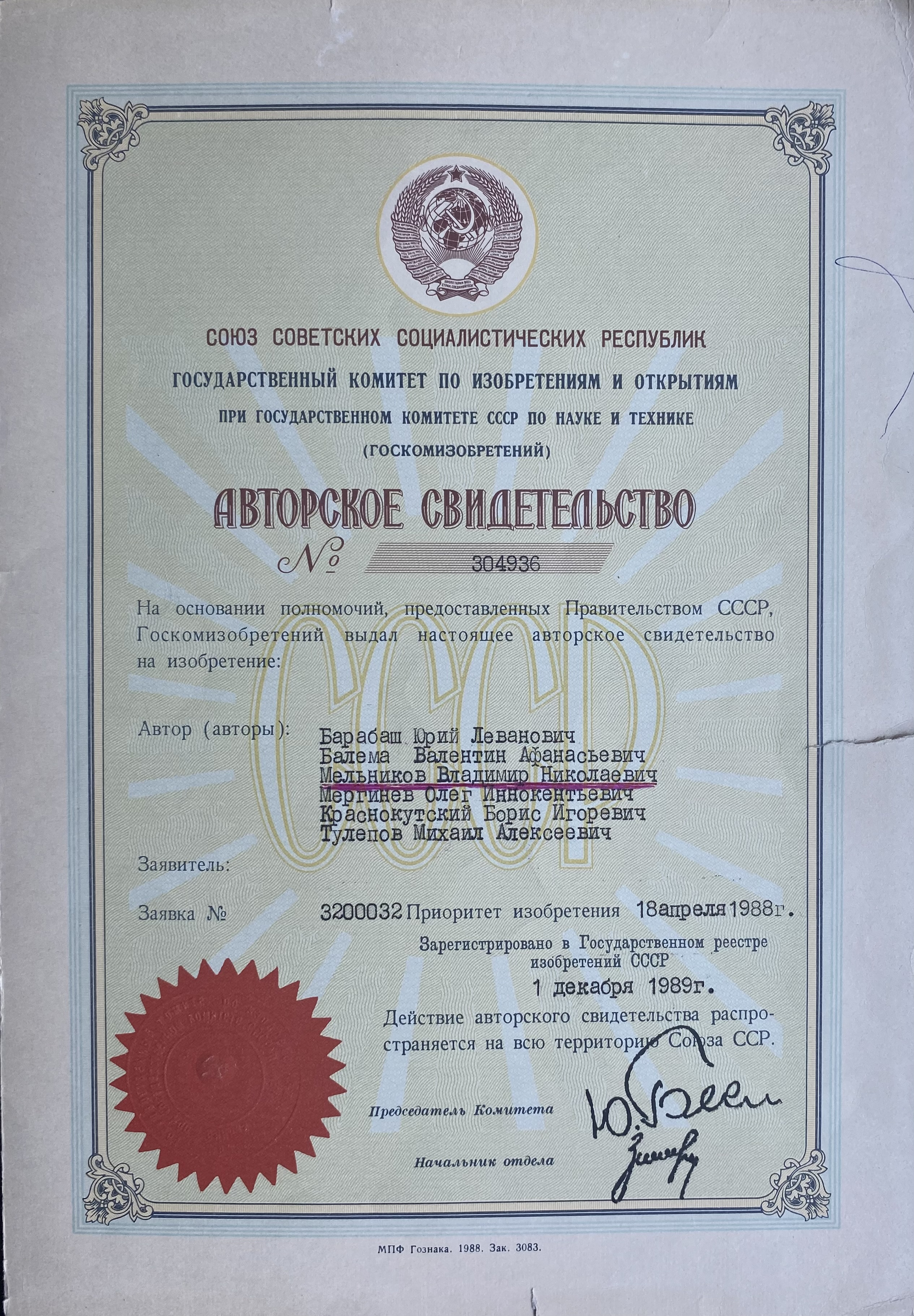

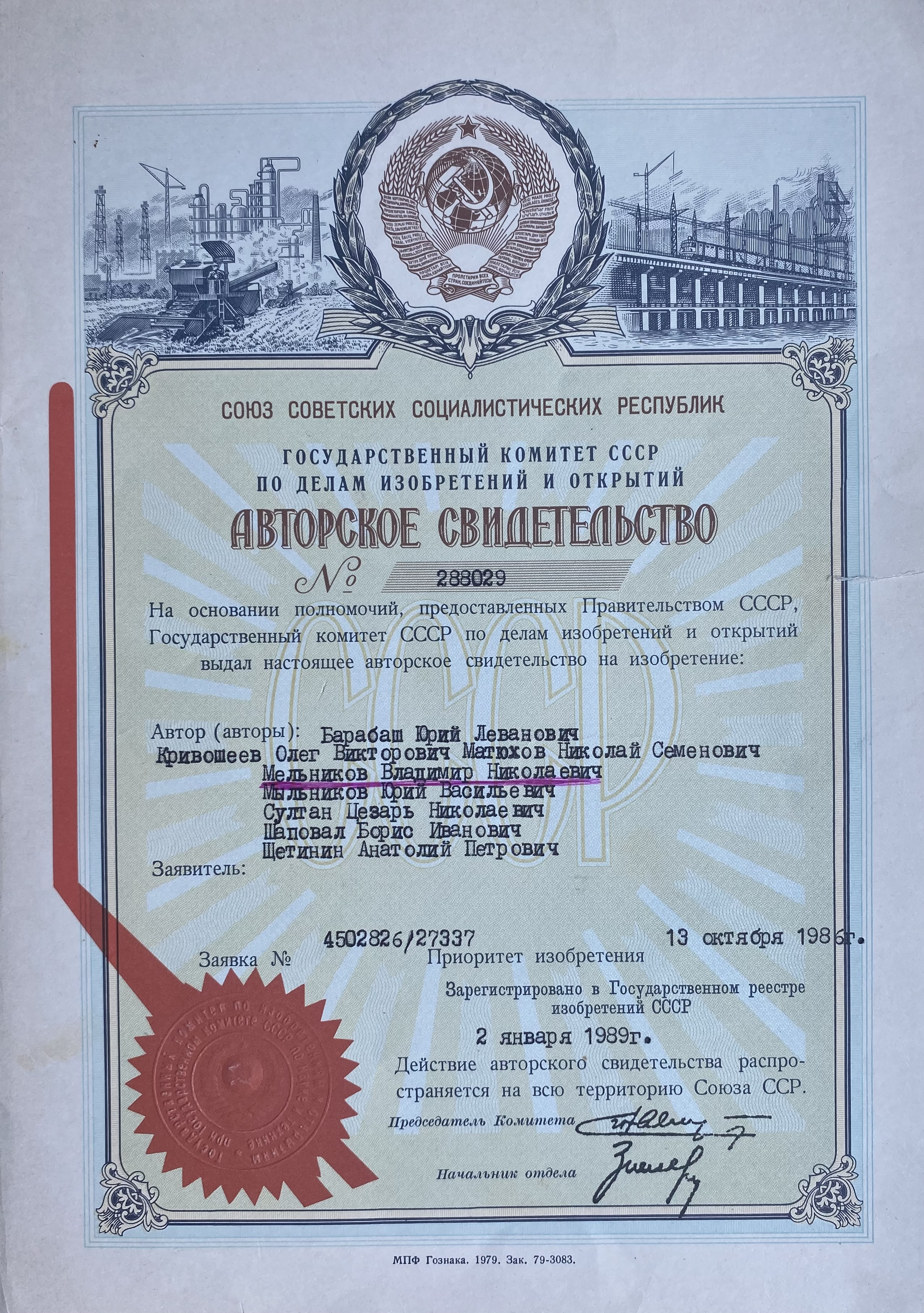

== Awards ==
- Polish Bronze Medal on the Watch of Peace (1979)
- The California State Medal "For Meritorious Service" (1997)
- Medal For Military Service to Ukraine (2000)
- Merited Figure of Arts of Ukraine (2004)
- Honorary Diploma of the Cabinet of Ministers of Ukraine (2004)
- Jubilee Medal "60 Years of the Armed Forces of the USSR"
- Jubilee Medal "70 Years of the Armed Forces of the USSR"
- Medal "For Impeccable Service" (1st class, 2nd class, 3rd class)

== Social activity ==
- Responsible Secretary of the Supervisory Board of the National Presidential Orchestra of Ukraine
- Deputy Chairman of the public organization of the Association of Bukovynes in the city of Kyiv "Bukovina"
