= Ivan Melnikov (footballer) =

Russian footballer (born 1997)

Personal information
- Full name: Ivan Valeryevich Melnikov
- Date of birth: 9 January 1997 (age 29)
- Place of birth: Domodedovo, Russia
- Height: 1.73 m (5 ft 8 in)
- Positions: Midfielder; defender

Youth career
- –2010: FC Moscow
- 2010–2011: FC Spartak Moscow
- 2011–2014: Yunost Moskvy-Torpedo Moscow

Senior career*
Years	Team	Apps	(Gls)
2014–2017	FC Torpedo Moscow	35	(1)
2017–2018	FC Amkar Perm	6	(0)
2018–2019	FC Shinnik Yaroslavl	5	(0)
2019	FC Tyumen	8	(0)
2021–2022	FC Peresvet Podolsk	38	(5)
- * Club domestic league appearances and goals

Ivan Valeryevich Melnikov (Russian: Иван Валерьевич Мельников; born 9 January 1997) is a Russian former football player who played as right-back or right midfielder.

== Club career ==
He made his debut in the Russian Professional Football League for FC Torpedo Moscow on 20 July 2015 in a game against FC Energomash Belgorod.

He made his Russian Premier League debut for FC Amkar Perm on 29 October 2017 in a game against FC Ural Yekaterinburg.

== Career statistics ==
=== Club ===
As of 20 May 2018

Club	Season	League			Cup		Continental		Total	
Club	Season	Division	Apps	Goals	Apps	Goals	Apps	Goals	Apps	Goals
Torpedo Moscow	2014–15	Russian Premier League	0	0	0	0	–		0	0
Torpedo Moscow	2015–16	PFL	16	0	1	0	–		17	0
Torpedo Moscow	2016–17	PFL	19	1	4	0	–		23	1
Torpedo Moscow	Total		35	1	5	0	0	0	40	1
Amkar Perm	2017–18	Russian Premier League	6	0	1	0	–		7	0
Career total			41	1	6	0	0	0	47	1
